= List of Malayalam films of 2011 =

The tables list the Malayalam films released in theatres in 2011. Premiere shows and film festival screenings are not considered as releases for this list.

== Released films ==
The following is the list of Malayalam films released in theatres in the year 2011.

=== Malayalam films ===
Opening		Title	Director	Cast	Genre	Ref
J A N U A R Y	7	Kayam (കയം)	Anil K. Nair	Manoj K. Jayan, Bala, Shwetha Menon	Drama, Erotic	
J A N U A R Y	7	Nakharam (നഖരം)	T. Deepesh	Ganesh Kumar, Architha, Jose Thettayil, Mamukkoya, Madhupal, Sreeletha	Drama	
J A N U A R Y	7	Traffic	Rajesh R. Pillai	Sreenivasan, Rahman, Kunchako Boban, Asif Ali, Anoop Menon, Vineeth Sreenivasan, Sandhya, Roma, Remya Nambeesan, Lena, Namitha Pramod	Thriller	
J A N U A R Y	14	Achan (അച്ഛൻ)	Ali Akbar	Thilakan, Sasi Eranjikkal	Drama	
J A N U A R Y	14	Note Out	Kutty Naduvil	Nishan, Mithra Kurian, Bijukkuttan, Anoop Chandran, Sumesh, Shiya	Comedy, Romance	
J A N U A R Y	21	Kudumbasree Travels (കുടുംബശ്രീ ട്രാവൽസ്‌)	Kiran	Jayaram, Bhavana, Jagathy Sreekumar, Janardhanan, K. P. A. C. Lalitha, Radhika	Family	
J A N U A R Y	21	The Metro	Bipin Prabhakar	Sarathkumar, Bhavana, Nivin Pauly, Jagathy Sreekumar, Suraj Venjaramoodu, Suresh Krishna	Action, Thriller	
J A N U A R Y	28	Arjunan Saakshi (അർജുനൻ സാക്ഷി)	Ranjith Sankar	Prithviraj, Ann Augustine	Thriller	
J A N U A R Y	28	Ithu Nammude Katha (ഇതു നമ്മുടെ കഥ)	Rajesh Kannankara	Nishan, Asif Ali, Abhishek, Ananya, Amala Paul, Nimisha Suresh	Drama	
J A N U A R Y	28	Ponnu Kondoru Aalroopam	T, S, Saji	Urvashi, Vinu Mohan		
F E B R U A R Y	4	Khaddama (ഗദ്ദാമ)	Kamal	Kavya Madhavan, Sreenivasan, Biju Menon	Drama	
F E B R U A R Y	10	Makeup Man	Shafi	Jayaram, Sheela	Masala	
F E B R U A R Y	11	Race	Kukku Surendran	Kunchacko Boban, Mamta Mohandas, Baby Anikha	Thriller	
F E B R U A R Y	18	Payyans (പയ്യൻസ്‌)	Leo Thaddeus	Jayasurya, Anjali, Lal, Rohini, Lalu Alex	Family, Drama	
F E B R U A R Y	19	Living Together	Fazil	Hemanth, Shivada, Sreejith, Darshak	Romance	
F E B R U A R Y	25	Nadakame Ulakam (നാടകമേ ഉലകം)	Viji Thampi	Mukesh, Vinu Mohan, Sarayu, Saranya Mohan, Jagadeesh, Suraj Venjaramoodu, Jagathy Sreekumar, Indrans	Comedy	
M A R C H	18	Christian Brothers	Joshiy	Mohanlal, Suresh Gopi, Dileep, Sarath Kumar, Lakshmi Rai, Kanika Subramaniam, Lakshmi Gopalaswamy, Kavya Madhavan	Action drama	
M A R C H	24	August 15	Shaji Kailas	Mammootty, Nedumudi Venu, Meghana Raj, Shwetha Menon, Siddique	Crime thriller	
M A R C H	31	Urumi (ഉറുമി)	Santosh Sivan	Prithviraj Sukumaran, Genelia D'Souza, Prabhu Deva, Nithya Menon, Arya, Tabu, Vidya Balan	Epic, Patriotism	
A P R I L	14	China Town	Rafi Mecartin	Mohanlal, Jayaram, Dileep, Kavya MadhavanPradeep Rawat, Suraj Venjaramoodu	Comedy	
A P R I L	14	Doubles	Sohan Seenulal	Mammootty, Nadia Moidu, Taapsee Pannu, Saiju Kurup	Drama, Comedy	
A P R I L	23	City of God	Lijo Jose Pellissery	Indrajith, Prithviraj Sukumaran, Parvathi Menon, Swetha Menon, Rima Kallingal	Crime, Thriller	
A P R I L	28	Mohabbath	East Coast Vijayan	Meera Jasmine, Anand Michael, Munna	Musical, Romance	
A P R I L	29	Bhakthajanangalude Sradhakku (ഭക്തജനങ്ങളുടെ ശ്രദ്ധയ്ക്ക്)	Priyanandanan	Kavya Madhavan, Irshad	Satire, Drama	
A P R I L	29	Lucky Jokers	Sunil	Suraj Venjaramoodu, Jagathy Sreekumar, Jagadeesh, Harishree Ashokan, Madhu, Vidisha	Comedy	
A P R I L	29	Melvilasom (മേൽവിലാസം)	Madhav Ramadasan	Suresh Gopi, R. Parthipan, Ashokan, Thalaivasal Vijay, Nizhalgal Ravi, Krishnakumar	Patriotism, Drama	
A P R I L	29	Kalabha Mazha (കളഭമഴ)	P. Sukumenon	Krishna, Radhika, Thilakan	Romance, Drama	
A P R I L	29	Akkarakazhchakal: The Movie	Abi Varghese, Ajayan Venugopalan			
M A Y	05	Manikyakkallu (മാണിക്യക്കല്ല്)	M. Mohanan	Prithviraj Sukumaran, Samvrutha Sunil, Nedumudi Venu, Salim Kumar	Drama	
M A Y	07	Seniors	Vysakh	Jayaram, Kunchako Boban, Biju Menon, Manoj K. Jayan, Padmapriya, Meera Nandan	Comedy mystery	
M A Y	13	Maharaja Talkies	Devidas Chelanatt	Mukesh, Urvashi		
M A Y	20	Janapriyan (ജനപ്രിയൻ)	Boban Samuel	Jayasurya, Bhama, Manoj K. Jayan, Sarayu	Romance, Comedy	
M A Y	20	Raghuvinte Swantham Raziya (രഘുവിന്റെ സ്വന്തം റസിയ)	Vinayan	Murali Krishnan, Meghana Raj, Charuhasan, Thilakan	Romance, Drama	
M A Y	27	The Train	Jayaraj	Mammootty, Jayasurya, Sheena Chohan, Sabitha Jayaraj	Thriller	
M A Y	27	Njaan Sanchaari (ഞാൻ സഞ്ചാരി)	Rajesh Balachandran	Prashanth Punappara (Ayyappa Baiju), Sonima Sreedhar, Bheeman Raghu, Urmila Unni, Shammi Thilakan	Drama	
M A Y	28	Aazhakadal (ആഴക്കടൽ)	Shaan	Kalabhavan Mani, Sruthi Lakshmi, Sai Kumar, Jayan Cherthala, Meghanathan, Vijayaraghavan, Shammi Thilakan		
J U N E	10	Sankaranum Mohananum (ശങ്കരനും മോഹനനും)	T. V. Chandran	Jayasurya, Meera Nandan	Comedy, Fantasy, Drama	
J U N E	10	Vaadamalli (വാടാമല്ലി)	Albert Antoni	Rahul Madhav, Richa Panai	Thriller	
J U N E	16	Rathinirvedam (രതിനിർവ്വേദം)	T. K. Rajeev Kumar	Swetha Menon, Sreejith Vijay	Romance	
J U N E	17	Uppukandam Brothers: Back in Action	T. S. Suresh Babu	Srikanth, Honey Rose, Babu Antony, Vani Viswanath	Action	
J U N E	24	Adaminte Makan Abu (ആദാമിന്റെ മകൻ അബു)	Salim Ahamed	Salim Kumar, Zarina Wahab	Drama	
J U N E	24	Kanakompathu (കാണാക്കൊമ്പത്ത്)	Mahadevan	Deepu Shanth, Shankar Narayanan, Vinod Kishan, Manoj K. Jayan, Mythili	Thriller	
J U N E	24	Kottarathil Kuttibhootham	Kumar Nanda	Mukesh, Jagadheesh, Althara, Sheela	Drama	
J U N E	30	Bombay March 12	Babu Janardhan	Mammootty, Unni Mukundan	Historical, Thriller, Drama	
J U L Y	1	Violin	Sibi Malayil	Asif Ali, Nithya Menon	Musical, Romance	
J U L Y	2	Three Kings	V. K. Prakash	Jayasurya, Kunchacko Boban, Indrajith Sukumaran	Comedy	
J U L Y	8	Salt N' Pepper	Aashiq Abu	Lal, Asif Ali, Shwetha Menon and Mythili	Comedy, Romance	
J U L Y	14	The Filmstaar	Sanjeev Raj	Kalabhavan Mani, Dileep, Rambha, Muktha	Drama	
J U L Y	15	Chaappa Kurishu (ചാപ്പാ കുരിശു്)	Sameer Thahir	Vineeth Sreenivasan, Fahad Fazil, Roma Asrani, Remya Nambeesan, Nivetha Thomas	Thriller	
J U L Y	15	Collector	Anil C Menon	Suresh Gopi, Yamini Varma, Mohini, Rajeev	Action	
J U L Y	15	Manushyamrugam (മനുഷ്യമൃഗം)	Baburaj	Prithviraj Sukumaran, Baburaj, Kiran Rathod, Oviya	Mystery Thriller	
J U L Y	22	Bangkok Summer	Pramod Pappan	Unni Mukundan, Richa Panai, Rahul Madhav	Romance	
J U L Y	28	Ninnishtam Ennishtam 2 (നിന്നിഷ്ടം എന്നിഷ്ടം 2)	Alleppey Ashraf	Suresh Nair, Sunitha, Mukesh, Priya	Romance	
J U L Y	29	Orma Mathram (ഓർമ്മ മാത്രം)	Madhu Kaithapram	Dileep, Priyanka Nair, Master Sidharth, Dhanya Mary Varghese	Thriller, Drama	
J U L Y	29	Scene No: 001	Snehajith	Saiju Kurup, Niyas, Roopasree, Priyanandanan		
A U G U S T	5	Veettilekkulla Vazhi (വീട്ടിലേക്കുള്ള വഴി)	Dr. Biju	Prithviraj Sukumaran, Indrajith Sukumaran, Master Govardhan, Dhanya Mary Varghese	Adventure, Drama	
A U G U S T	5	Oru Nunakkatha (ഒരു നുണക്കഥ)	Johnson Thankachan	Vivek, Piyush, Aswathy, Jagathy Sreekumar, Riyaz Khan		
A U G U S T	12	Kadhayile Nayika (കഥയിലെ നായിക)	Dileep	Urvashi, Roma, Kalabhavan Prajod, Suraj Venjaramoodu	Romance, Comedy	
A U G U S T	12	Chungakkarum Veshyakalum (ചുങ്കക്കാരും വേശ്യകളും)	Isaac Thomas	Thilakan, Sanjay George, Michelle Sinclair	Drama	
A U G U S T	25	Priyappetta Nattukare (പ്രിയപ്പെട്ട നാട്ടുകാരേ)	Sreejith Paleri	Kalabhavan Mani, Bala, Lakshmi Sharma	Political	
A U G U S T	26	Ven Shankhu Pol (വെൺ ശംഖുപോൽ)	Ashok R Rath	Suresh Gopi, Manoj K Jayan, Jyothirmayi, Meera Nandan	Drama	
A U G U S T	26	Umma (ഉമ്മ)	Vijayakrishnan	Shobha Mohan, Sreehari, Madhu	Drama	
A U G U S T	30	Teja Bhai & Family	Deepu Karunakaran	Prithviraj, Akhila Sasidharan	Romance, Action, Comedy	
A U G U S T	30	Arabipponnu (അറബിപ്പൊന്നു്)	Vijay	Thilakan, K. R. Vijaya, Joobin Rajan P Dev, Soorya, Sarika	Drama	
A U G U S T	31	My Dear Kuttichathan 3D	Jijo	Kottarakkara Sreedharan Nair, Dalip Tahil, Master Arvind, Master Suresh, Baby Sonia	Fantasy, Children	
A U G U S T	31	Pranayam	Blessy	Mohanlal, Jaya Prada, Anupam Kher	Romance; Drama	
S E P T E M B E R	8	Sevenes	Joshiy	Kunchacko Boban, Bhama, Asif Ali, Rima Kallingal, Nadia Moidu	Sports, Drama, Romance	
S E P T E M B E R	9	Ulakam Chuttum Valiban (ഉലകം ചുറ്റും വാലിബൻ)	Raj Babu	Jayaram, Mithra Kurian, Biju Menon, Suraj Venjaramoodu	Comedy, Drama	
S E P T E M B E R	9	Doctor Love	K Biju	Kunchacko Boban, Bhavana, Ananya	Romance, Comedy	
S E P T E M B E R	23	Sarkar Colony	V. S. Jayakrishna	Mukesh, Devayani	Comedy, Drama	
S E P T E M B E R	23	Koratty Pattanam Railway Gate (കൊരട്ടി പട്ടണം റെയിൽവേ ഗേറ്റ്)	Hafiz Ismail	Ajay Natesh, Mallika, Premnath, Rajeev Rajan	Drama	
S E P T E M B E R	30	Snehaveedu (സ്നേഹവീടു്)	Sathyan Anthikkadu	Mohanlal, Padmapriya, Biju Menon, Sheela	Drama	
S E P T E M B E R	30	Makaramanju (മകരമഞ്ഞു്)	Lenin Rajendran	Santhosh Sivan, Karthika Nair, Nithya Menen	Epic, Biographical, Romance, Drama	
O C T O B E R	6	Indian Rupee	Ranjith	Prithviraj, Rima Kallingal	Satire, Drama	
O C T O B E R	14	Pachuvum Kovalanum (പാച്ചുവും കോവാലനും)	Thaha	Mukesh, Suraj Venjaramood, Meghna Raj, Jyothirmayi	Comedy	
O C T O B E R	14	Sandwich	M. S. Manu	Kunchacko Boban, Richa Panai, Ananya	Romance, Comedy	
O C T O B E R	14	Veeraputhran (വീരപുത്രൻ)	P. T. Kunju Muhammed	Narain, Raima Sen, Lakshmi Gopalaswamy	Historical, Biographical	
O C T O B E R	21	Krishnanum Radhayum (കൃഷ്ണനും രാധയും)	Santhosh Pandit	Santhosh Pandit, Souparnika, Rupa Jith, Devika	Family, Drama	
O C T O B E R	26	Sthalam	Kaviyoor Sivaprasad	Bala, Shweta Mohan		
N O V E M B E R	25	Naayika (നായിക)	Jayaraj	Jayaram, Padmapriya, Sharada	Drama	
N O V E M B E R	25	Swapna Sanchari (സ്വപ്ന സഞ്ചാരി)	Kamal	Jayaram, Samvrutha Sunil	Drama	
D E C E M B E R	2	Beautiful	V. K. Prakash	Jayasurya, Meghana Raj, Anoop Menon	Suspense thriller	
D E C E M B E R	2	Innanu Aa Kalyanam (ഇന്നാണു് ആ കല്യാണം)	Rajasenan	Rejith Menon, Saranya Mohan, Malavika Wales	Romance, Comedy	
D E C E M B E R	2	Sundara Kalyanam (സുന്ദര കല്യാണം)	Chandra Mohan	Ubaid, Sruthi Lakshmi	Romance, Drama	
D E C E M B E R	9	Athe Mazha Athe Veyil (അതേ മഴ അതേ വെയിൽ)	G. Manu	Anoop Menon, Lena	Drama	
D E C E M B E R	9	Bhagavathipuram (ഭഗവതിപുരം)	Prakashan	Ashraf, Arun, Souparnika	Drama	
D E C E M B E R	9	Happy Durbar	Hari Amaravila	Mukesh, Suraj Venjaramood	Comedy	
D E C E M B E R	9	Killadi Raman (കില്ലാടി രാമൻ)	Thulasidas	Mukesh, Megha Nair, Siddique	Comedy, Drama	
D E C E M B E R	13	Adimadhyantham	Sherrey	Prajith, Sajitha Madathil, Mamukkoya		
D E C E M B E R	16	Oru Marubhoomikkadha (അറബീം ഒട്ടകോം പി. മാധവൻ നായരും ഇൻ ഒരു മരുഭൂമിക്കഥ)	Priyadarshan	Mohanlal, Mukesh, Lakshmi Rai, Bhavana	Comedy, Romance	
D E C E M B E R	16	Venicile Vyapari (വെനീസിലെ വ്യാപാരി )	Shafi	Mammootty, Kavya Madhavan, Poonam Bajwa	Comedy, Drama	
D E C E M B E R	17	Bombay Mittayi	Umar Karikkad	Vinu Mohan, Neelambari, Dimple Kapadia		
D E C E M B E R	25	Vellaripravinte Changathi (വെള്ളരിപ്രാവിന്റെ ചങ്ങാതി)	Akku Akbar	Dileep, Indrajith, Kavya Madhavan, Manoj K. Jayan	Drama	
