= Sachi-Sethu =

Former screenwriter duo of Sachy and Sethu who worked in Malayalam cinema

Sachi-Sethu was a former screenwriter duo of Sachy and Sethu who worked in Indian Malayalam cinema. The pair wrote a total of five films, beginning with Chocolate in 2007 and ending with Doubles in 2011, after which they worked as independent writers. Each made their solo debuts in 2012 with Run Baby Run (Sachi) and Mallu Singh (Sethu), respectively.

== Filmography ==
Year	Title	Director
2007	Chocolate	Shafi
2009	Robin Hood	Joshiy
2011	Makeup Man	Shafi
2011	Doubles	Sohan Seenulal
2011	Seniors	Vysakh

=== Scripted by Sachi ===
Year	Title	Director
2012	Run Baby Run	Joshiy
2012	Chettayees	Shajoon Kariyal
2015	Anarkali	Himself
2017	Ramaleela	Arun Gopi
2017	Sherlock Toms	Shafi
2019	Driving Licence	Lal Jr.
2020	Ayyappanum Koshiyum	Himself

=== Scripted by Sethu ===
Year	Title	Director
2012	Mallu Singh	Vysakh
2012	I Love Me	B. Unnikrishnan
2013	Salaam Kashmier	Joshiy
2014	Cousins	Vysakh
2017	Achayans	Kannan Thamarakkulam
2018	Oru Kuttanadan Blog	Himself
2023	Maheshum Marutiyum	Himself
2025	Khajuraho Dreams	Manoj Vasudev
