= Kalakkura Chandru =

- VCD cover
- Directed by: Ravi-Raja
- Written by: Rafi-Mecartin
- Produced by: B. Sampoornam
- Starring: Karthik; Radha Ravi; Pandiarajan
- Edited by: A. Joseph
- Music by: Sunil Xavier
- Production company: Sri Ashtalakshmi Films
- Release date: 3 January 2007
- Running time: 148 minutes
- Country: India
- Language: Tamil

Kalakkura Chandru (transl. You're on a roll, Chandru) is a 2007 Indian Tamil-language comedy film directed by the duo Ravi-Raja. The movie stars Karthik, Radha Ravi and Pandiarajan, It was a remake of Malayalam film One Man Show (2001) but failed to repeat the success at the box office.

== Cast ==
- Karthik as Chandru
- Radha Ravi as Ravi Verma
- Pandiarajan as Singampuli
- Bhuvana as Shweta
- Urvashi as Host
- Mohan Raman as Advocate
- Singamuthu as Muthu
- Balu Anand as Police inspector
- Bayilvan Ranganathan as Veera Verma
- Alex as Doctor
- Haja Sheriff
- Suruli Manohar

== Production ==
Ravi and Raja who earlier directed low-budget devotional films like Subramaniaswamy and Aarumugaswamy announced in 2005 that their next directorial is titled as Adhirshtham. The film is a remake of Malayalam film One Man Show directed by Shafi and starred Jayaram. Karthik appeared in this film thus making his comeback, he claimed that he selected this film because he wanted his comeback to be different.

== Soundtrack ==
Music was composed by Sunil Lyrics written by tamilamudhan

- "Echampai"
- "Macham Konda"
- "Nagakannil"
- "Sollava Naan Sollava"

== Release and reception ==
The film was released on 3 January 2007.

Malini Mannath of Chennai Online wrote "For fans of Karthik it will be a let down. For neither the actor nor the film works at any level". S. R. Ashok Kumar of The Hindu wrote "Anything well begun raises expectations. A film that starts with an interesting scene makes the viewers sit up for a fairly sumptuous fare. Thus when `Kalakkarae Chandru' opens with a scene a la the famous `Kaun Banega Crorepati' one's curiosity is aroused. But as the film progresses one realises with dismay that it is about the one and only gripping segment. It is again a case of the director unable to make use of a good theme".
