= Shaji Kumar =

Indian cinematographer (1968–2026)

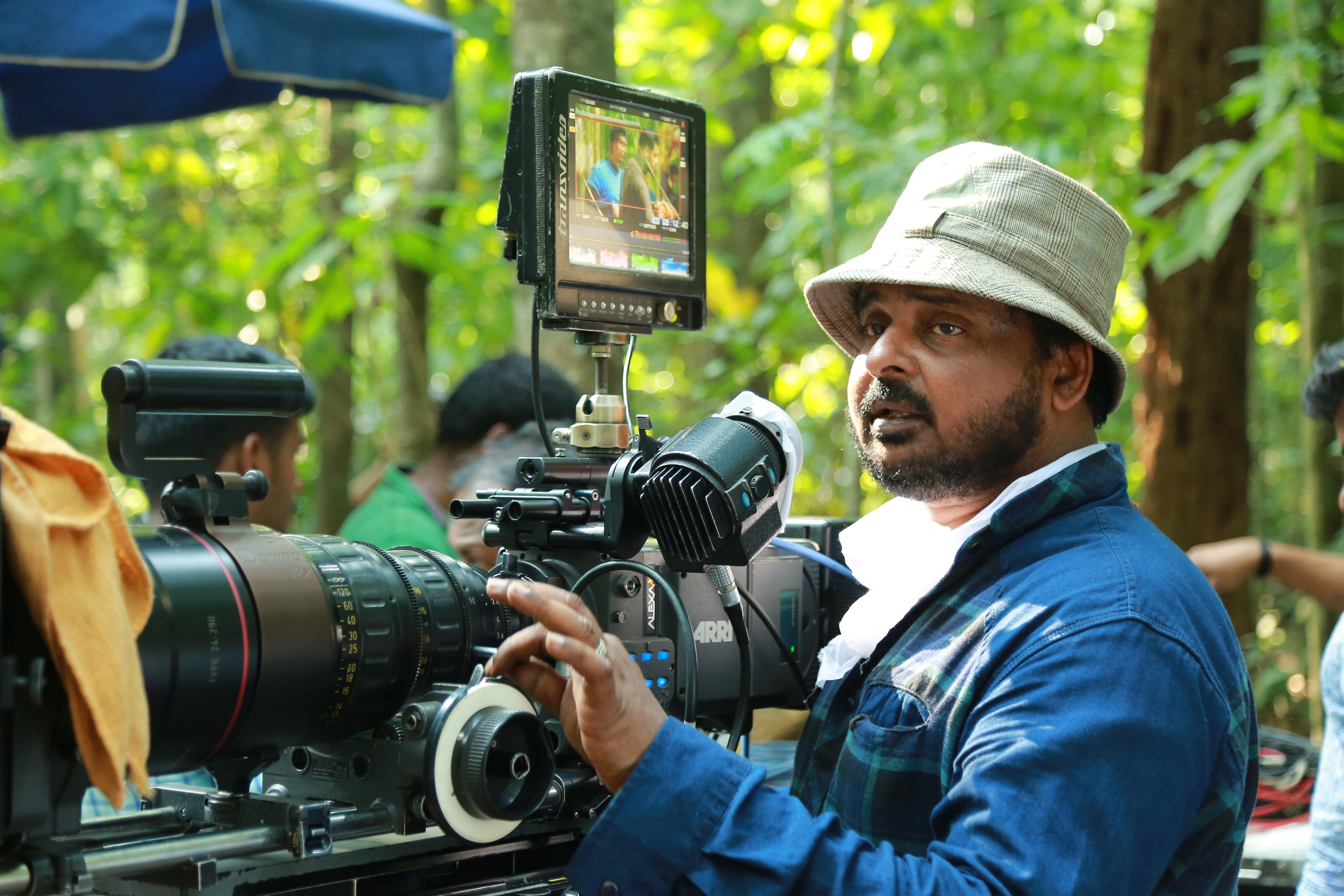
- Born: 1968 or 1969; Kochi, Kerala, India
- Died: 10 November 2026 (aged 57); Kochi, Kerala, India
- Occupation: Cinematographer
- Years active: 2002–2026
- Spouse: Smitha
- Children: Aryan, Sooryan

Shaji Kumar (1968 or 1969 – 10 November 2026) was an Indian cinematographer who worked in the Malayalam and Tamil film industries.

== Career ==
Kumar began his career as a cinematographer for Malayalam films, He has frequently collaborated with leading Indian filmmakers like Shaji Kailas, Joshiy, Vinayan and Vysakh, before moving on to balance those commitments alongside Tamil films. In the Tamil film industry, he extensively collaborated with actor Prashanth for his films, receiving critical acclaim for his work in Ponnar Shankar (2011), while he also shot Mambattiyan (2011) and Saahasam (2016).

== Personal life and death ==
Kumar was married to Smitha. They had two sons; Aryan and Sooryan. Kumar died from heart failure in Kochi, on 10 November 2026, at the age of 57.

== Filmography ==
List of Shaji Kumar film credits
Year	Title	Notes
2001	Uthaman	
2002	Valkannadi	
2002	Pakalppooram	
2002	Kanmashi	
2003	Ammakilikkoodu	
2003	Pattanathil Sundaran	
2004	Njan Salperu Ramankutty	
2004	Vellinakshatram	
2004	Sathyam	
2004	Vesham	
2005	Athbhutha Dweepu	
2005	Naran	
2006	Yes Your Honour	
2006	Mahha Samudram	
2006	Baba Kalyani	
2007	July 4	
2007	Nasrani	
2008	Cycle	
2008	Veruthe Oru Bharya	
2009	Robin Hood	
2009	Red Chillies	
2010	Pokkiri Raja	
2010	Kanagavel Kaaka	
2010	Toofan	Hindi
2011	Ponnar Shankar	Tamil
2011	Seniors	
2011	Doctor Love	
2011	Mambattiyan	Tamil
2012	The King & the Commissioner	
2012	Mallu Singh	
2012	Madirasi	
2012	Simhasanam	
2013	Sringaravelan	
2013	Sound Thoma	
2014	Rajadhi Raja	
2014	Ring Master	
2014	Cousins	
2016	Saahasam	Tamil
2016	Pulimurugan	
2017	Ramaleela	
2018	Mohanlal	
2018	Odiyan	
2019	Madhura Raja	
2019	Ittymaani: Made in China	
2022	Night Drive	
2022	Pathonpatham Noottandu	
2023	Bandra	
2023	Kadhikan	
2024	Once Upon a Time in Kochi	
2025	Thudarum	
2025	Bha Bha Ba	Additional cinematography
2026	Athimanoharam †	
TBA	Ottakomban †	

== Awards ==
Asiavision Awards

- 2016: Best Cinematographer – Pulimurugan
