= One Man Show (film) =

2001 Indian film

- One Man Show Movie poster
- Directed by: Shafi
- Written by: Rafi Mecartin
- Produced by: Girish Vaikom
- Starring: Jayaram; Lal; Samyuktha Varma
- Narrated by: Lal
- Cinematography: Anandakuttan
- Edited by: K. P. Hariharaputhran
- Music by: Suresh Peters (songs); Rajamani (score)
- Production company: Aswathy Films
- Distributed by: Lal Release; Rafa International
- Release date: 25 December 2001
- Running time: 147 minutes
- Country: India
- Language: Malayalam

One Man Show is a 2001 Indian Malayalam-language comedy-drama film directed by Shafi (in his directorial debut) and written by the Rafi Mecartin duo. It stars Jayaram, Samyuktha Varma, Lal, Manya, Kalabhavan Mani and Narendra Prasad. The story unfolds in the course of a TV game show. The film was remade in Tamil as Kalakkura Chandru (2007).

== Plot ==
Jayakrishnan participates in a prize winning show, One Man Show hosted by popular movie star Mukesh. During the course of the show, the host pries into Jayakrishnan's past, and the whole story is unwound in a flashback. Jayakrishnan, his uncle K. R. Menon, and his cousin (Menon's daughter) Radhika, who is also Jayakrishnan's sweetheart, live together. They are lawyers by profession, and their house is nicknamed "Kodathi Veedu" (courthouse).

Among the lawyers of Kodathi Veedu, Jayakrishnan and his Junior Ponnappan are the only ones idle. No client ever comes to Jayakrishnan and hence is unable to earn anything, as he had bungled some cases earlier. While K. R Menon and Radhika are successful lawyers, Jayakrishnan is constantly derided for his failure. However, he decides that he'd marry Radhika only after he has fought and won a legal battle. So Jayakrishnan and Ponnappan decide to reopen the case of Hari Narayanan, who has been in a mental asylum for the past few years.

Jayakrishnan, with timely help from Doctor Raziya, his friend, proves in court that Hari Narayanan is not insane by having Hari Narayan answer difficult questions posed by the opposition lawyer K.R. Menon. Jayakrishnan successfully proves that Harinarayanan was dubbed a madman by his own brother Raveendran (Janardhanan), who wants to usurp his assets. Jayakrishnan wins the lawsuit. Hari Narayanan is released from the mental asylum, and Jayakrishnan marries Radhika.

But the plot takes a sharp turn when Jayakrishnan discovers that Hari Narayanan is, in fact, insane. Jayakrishnan is helpless as he is ashamed to expose Hari Narayanan's insanity. Meanwhile, the insane Hari Narayanan thinks that it is he who has married Radhika. A series of strange incidents occurs, leading everyone to believe it is Jayakrishnan who is insane. Meanwhile, Hari Narayanan begins to seek revenge on his brother. He bombs his brother's factory, which causes a huge financial loss. Since it was Radhika who legally offered bail for Hari Narayanan, she is held responsible for covering the loss. They are unable to pay this amount, and Radhika goes to prison.

It is in an attempt to get Radhika released that Jayakrishnan has come to the TV game show. In the end, he wins the game show and frees Radhika.

== Cast ==
- Jayaram as Adv. Jayakrishnan
- Samyuktha Varma as Adv. Radhika Menon, Jayakrishnan's Fiancée and Wife
- Lal as Harinarayanan
- Kalabhavan Mani as Adv. Ponnappan, Jayakrishnan's friend and Junior Advocate
- Manya as Dr. Raziya, Jayakrishnan's best friend
- Narendra Prasad as Adv. K. R. Menon, Radhika's father
- Janardhanan as Raveendran, Harinarayanan's brother
- Salim Kumar as Bhaskaran, Mental Patient
- N. F. Varghese as Dr. Nambiar, Raveendran's friend
- Indrans as Achuthan, Menon's clerk and driver
- Cochin Haneefa as Prem, Contestant of One Man Show
- Machan Varghese as Pankajakshan
- T. P. Madhavan as Dr. Chandradas
- Kalabhavan Navas as Shahjahan, Raziya's ex-fiancé
- V. K. Sreeraman as Ahammed Haji, Raziya's father
- Ramu as Jailor
- Manka Mahesh as Jayakrishnan's sister (voice by Anandavally)
- Radhika as Aswathi, Jayakrishnan's niece
- Renjith K R as a mental patient
- Mukesh as Himself: Host of One Man Show (special appearance)

== Soundtrack ==
The songs in this movie were written by Kaithapram Damodaran Namboothiri and were given music by Suresh Peters. The music was distributed by Sathyam Audios.

- "Pavizhamalar Penkodi": M. G. Sreekumar, K. S. Chithra
- "Rosappoo Rosappoo": M. G. Sreekumar, K. S. Chithra
- "Kasithumba": P. Unnikrishnan, Swarnalatha
- "Adyathe": P. Jayachandran
- "Rakkadambil": M. G. Sreekumar, Mano
- "Oru Mulam": Srinivas, Sujatha Mohan
- "Neelaravil": M. G. Sreekumar
- "Niramazhayil": Mano, Sujatha Mohan, Suresh Peters, Chorus
- "Kasithumba Poove": P. Unnikrishnan

== Reception ==
A critic from Screen wrote that "One Man Show, produced by Girish Vaikom under the banner of Aswathy Films and directed by debutant Shafi, tries a novel approach as far as narration is concerned". A critic from Sify wrote that "The Thenkasipattanam team does not get their story correct, as in the second half the film drags on. Still thanks to Jayaram and Mukesh, the film just manages to keep afloat". A critic from Kalakeralam.com wrote that "Since their last rib-tickler Thenkasippattanam was a laugh riot, one would expect Rafi-Mecartin to ting their next film with a profuse dose of humor. But, the maiden directorial venture of Shafi, One Man Show lacks the spark, verve and fun pace of Thenkasippattanam".
