= Mallu Singh =

- Theatrical poster
- Directed by: Vysakh
- Written by: Sethu
- Produced by: Neeta Anto
- Starring: Unni Mukundan
- Cinematography: Shaji Kumar
- Edited by: Mahesh Narayanan
- Music by: Songs: M. Jayachandran; Score: Gopi Sundar
- Production company: Aan Mega Media
- Distributed by: Aan Mega Media
- Release date: 4 May 2012
- Running time: 150 minutes
- Country: India
- Language: Malayalam

Mallu Singh (lit. 'Malayali Singh') is a 2012 Indian Malayalam-language action comedy film written by Sethu and directed by Vysakh. The film stars Unni Mukundan in the lead role alongside Kunchacko Boban, Biju Menon, Manoj K. Jayan and Samvrutha Sunil in supporting roles.

The film was prominently marketed as Kunchacko Boban's 50th film. Kunchacko Boban played the narrative lead, while Unni Mukundan's action-oriented portrayal of the central character, Mallu Singh, marked a breakthrough in his career as a lead actor.

Released on 4 May 2012, Mallu Singh became a major commercial success, ran for over 100 days in theatres and was among the ten highest-grossing Malayalam films of the year. It was subsequently dubbed into Hindi as Action King Mallu Singh and into Bengali as Fighter Mallu Singh.

== Plot ==
In a district court of Palakkad, Ananthan waits for a verdict regarding the heir of an isolated land, but he is informed that the verdict has been postponed for three months. The lawyer ensures that Hari Narayanan alias Hari would never return and his 127 acres land can be seized by Ananthan and brothers once the final report shows up.

Ananthan and his brothers, in the sheer confidence, threatens Aniyan "Ani" and his younger sister Aswathy "Achu" as they are also competing for the land, challenging them that Hari won't come back alive as he is believed dead. Ani wants to find Hari, who has been missing for seven years. Ani finds his grandmother in tears most of the time and watching her, along with the pressure from Ananthan, Ani decides that he must find Hari. When Ani recognizes Hari in a TV program featuring Punjab, he sets forth to Punjab with expectations of finding Hari. On his way to Punjab, Ani meets Pooja and falls in love with her. Pooja happens to be the sister of Mallu Singh for whom Ani came searching for. Ani arrives in Mallu Street and meets Karthikeyan "Karthi", Papan and Susheelan. When they learn that Ani has arrived in search of Hari, they ask about Hari.

Past: Valiyampattu Raghavan Nair, Ani's father and Hari's maternal uncle, proceeds with his harvest festival, but Ananthan and his father Govindan Kutty, who holds a grudge against Raghavan's family, interrupts the harvest. Hari arrives at the spot, where Govindan tells that Raghavan and Ani have come to seize Hari's property. When Hari ignores, Govindan warns Hari to be aware of Raghavan as Hari will be kicked out of the family. Later, Govindankutty discloses Ananthan about the Power of Attorney handed over to Raghavan which made him the hier of the land for years. Govindankutty decides to finish Hari in order to own the vast land before it goes to Hari. Ananthan promises that he will do whatever needful. Hari decides to organise a new business in the hope to earn some money, but in vain. Hari and Achu had been in love with each other since their childhood. When Raghavan Nair arranged a marriage proposal for Achu, Ani and Hari interfere with it and cancels the marriage. This enrages Raghavan and he slaps Ani for canceling his own sister's marriage for a jobless Hari. To get rid of burdens and humiliations, Hari decides to leave the village for peace and promises a return after a long time. Ani goes to his father and pleads with him to bring Hari back. Raghavan reveals that he had already accepted Hari as his son-in-law, but he wanted Hari to become responsible and also earn well. On his way, Hari hears the screams of Raghavan. When Hari is about to help him, Govindan Kutty and Ananthan accuse Hari for killing his own uncle for wealth. From that moment, Hari was never seen, but the family's caretaker Nanu reveals about Ananthan and Govindan Kutty's involvement in Raghavan's death.

Present: On hearing the story, Karthi and Pappan decides to help Ani find Hari and resolve his issues in Kerala. They are still sure that it might not be the Harinder Singh as they knew as he is a proper Sikh. One day, Ani finds Hari thrashing a student for troubling his sister Neethu. Keen on seeing him, Ani enthusiastically calls Hari, expecting to be recognised, but he identifies himself as Harinder Singh, who looks and behaves like a typical Punjabi. Ani discovers that Hari is Mallu Singh. Ani wants to make sure about Hari's identity and decides to stay there for a long period. Karthi, Pappan and Susheelan also help Ani. They set out to search for evidence to prove that Mallu Singh is Hari.

Ani tries all his luck to make Hari reveal the truth, where he even brings Achu to Punjab. Even after Harinder Singh's marriage gets fixed with Achu, Hari refuses to admit that he is Hari. A disheartened Ani tells that he is not ready for the marriage and they plan to return to Kerala. Harinder Singh comes to their room and tells that he is actually Hari and reveals the truth about being Harinder Singh.

Past: Disheartened by witnessing Raghavan's death, Hari leaves the village and makes way through the highway, where the real Harinder Singh gives him a lift in his truck. On the way, Harinder reveals that he had left his home when he was a child and he also happily tells that he is going to meet his family after a long gap in Punjab. As fate would have it, Harinder hands over the truck to Hari and takes rest. While driving the truck, Hari felt asleep, which led to an accident in which Harinder dies. A shocked and frustrated Hari reaches Punjab only to witness Harinder's family being harassed by goons. Hari rescues them and defeats the goons. Harinder's father considers him as his own son and from then on Hari changes his identity to Mallu Singh.

Present: Hari tells that he is helpless and has to be Mallu Singh for the rest of his life, but Harinder Singh's father hears this and tells that Hari can live with them as their son, but he has to accompany Ani and settle his family problems. In Kerala, long after Govindan's death, Ananthan plans the measurement of the land kept for the verdict with a day remaining. Hari, Ani, Karthi and Pappan arrive at the spot and brutualy beats Ananthan and his brothers and recover their land and avenge Raghavan's death, finally returning to Punjab and living happily thereafter.

== Cast ==
- Unni Mukundan as Hari Narayanan (Hari) / Harindar Singh aka Mallu Singh (voice dubbed by Mithun Ramesh)
- Kunchacko Boban as Valiyampattu Aniyan (Ani/Anikuttan)
- Biju Menon as Karthikeyan (Karthi), Ani's friend
- Manoj K. Jayan as Pappan (Pappa), Harindar's right hand
- Samvrutha Sunil as Aswathy (Achu), Ani's Sister and Hari's love interest and later wife
- Suresh Krishna as Cheruparambathu Ananthan, Govindankutty's son, Ani and Hari's rival
- Siddique as Valiyampattu Raghavan Nair, Ani and Achu's father
- Sai Kumar as Cheruparambathu Govindankutty
- Shavinder Mahal as Harindar's father
- Geetha as Harindar's mother
- Rupa Manjari as Pooja, Ani's love interest and Harindar Singh's first younger sister
- Meera Nandan as Neethu, Pappan's love interest and Harindar Singh's second younger sister
- Aparna Nair as Shwetha, Karthi's love interest and Harindar Singh's third younger sister
- Shaalin Zoya as Nithya, Harindar Singh's youngest sister
  - Esther Anil as young Nithya
- Suraj Venjaramoodu as Susheelan
- Ganapathi S Poduval as Hari
- Mamukkoya as Nanu
- Joju George as Cheruparambathu Bhaskaran, Ananthan's younger brother
- Sreejith Ravi as Cheruparambathu Chandran, Ananthan's younger brother
- Kalasala Babu as Sukumaran Marar, the lawyer
- Lakshmi Krishna Moorthy as Lakshmikutty, grandmother
- Chemban Ashokan as Kandan Koran
- Kalabhavan Haneef as a villager
- Vysakh as a Singh in the truck (special appearance)
- Udayakrishna as a Singh in the truck (special appearance)
- Asif Ali as the original Harindar Singh (special appearance)
- Hanzil Hydar Ali as Kuttoos (special appearance)

== Production ==
Prithviraj Sukumaran was initially to play the role of Mallu Singh, but due to busy schedules, it went to Unni Mukundan.

== Soundtrack ==
Mallu Singh

Soundtrack album by M. Jayachandran
- Released: 6 April 2012
- Recorded: 2012
- Genre: Feature film soundtrack
- Language: Malayalam
- Producer: Neeta Anto

M. Jayachandran chronology
Swapna Sanchari (2011)	Mallu Singh (2012)	Chattakaari (2012)

The soundtrack of the film was composed by M. Jayachandran with lyrics penned by Murukan Kattakada and Rajeev Alunkal. The background score was composed by Gopi Sundar.

No.	Title	Artist(s)	Length
1.	"Cham Cham"	K. J. Yesudas, Shreya Ghoshal
2.	"Kinginikattu"	Haricharan, Navraj Hans
3.	"Rab Rab Rab"	Shankar Mahadevan, Sithara, Suchismitha
4.	"Kakka Malayile"	Alex, M. Jayachandran, Nikhil Raj
5.	"Punjabi Prayer"	Shreya Ghoshal

== Reception ==
=== Critical response ===
Sify wrote "Mallu Singh could be appealing in parts for those viewers who are there just for fun, without much logic. For the rest, here is one movie with lots of styles but no substance at all." Rediff stated that Mallu Singh is entertaining.

== Box office ==
The film was a commercial success and ran over 100 days.
