= Chocolate (2007 film) =

2007 movie directed by Shafi

- Directed by: Shafi
- Written by: Sachi-Sethu
- Produced by: P. K. Muraleedharan; Santha Murali
- Starring: Prithviraj Sukumaran; Jayasurya; Roma; Samvrutha Sunil; Remya Nambeeshan
- Cinematography: Alagappan N
- Edited by: K. P. Hariharaputhran
- Music by: Alex Paul
- Release date: 12 October 2007
- Country: India
- Language: Malayalam

Chocolate is a 2007 Indian Malayalam-language romantic comedy film directed by Shafi. The film stars Prithviraj Sukumaran, Jayasurya, Roma Asrani, Samvrutha Sunil, and Remya Nabeeshan. The film has been remade in Telugu in 2010 as Chalaki with Aditya Babu and Roma also reprises her role from the original.

A reboot, titled Chocolate Story Retold, directed by Binu Peter and starring Unni Mukundan and Noorin Shereef was announced in 2018 but later got shelved.

== Plot ==
The movie is set against the backdrop of St. Mary's Women's College. As per policy, one seat is reserved for a male student for the PG course, and it may be allotted at the discretion of the principal. Vanaja, a teacher in the Sociology Department, is trying to get the seat for her son, Shyam, who got nine suspensions and seven police cases in the college where he is studying. Principal Elena John gives the seat to Shyam, on the assurance of the teacher that she will take care of his son without causing any problems.

Things were not going well for Shyam, the lone male pupil among 3,000 girl students. The group, which includes Ann, daughter of PTA President Mathews, Nandana, daughter of Bahuleyan, and their friend Susan tries to smoke Shyam out. A group led by their opponent, Preetha, is in favor of Shyam. Gradually, Shyam and Ann get closer but do not openly like each other. Meanwhile, a fashion designer named Ranjith, seeks Shyam's help to persuade Nandana to model at the Femina Show. Along with his friends Pappan and Ranjith, Shyam break up Ann's marriage proposal with Manuel Abraham. Knowing that Ranjith is in love with Nandana, Shyam brings his friends and Ranjith to college in the name of training children as part of the University Fest. Ann argues with Shyam over the breakup of her marriage proposal to Manuel. Meanwhile, Bahuleyan, who gets photos of Shyam and Nandana interacting closely, sends some goons to attack and warn Shyam, thinking that they are in love. But Shyam fights them and escapes. Shyam thinks that Ann assuming that sent the photos, and breakups with her. She angrily says that she did everything. Hearing this, Nandana also cuts her friendship with Ann. Bahuleyan gets more photos and comes with a group of goons. Knowing this, Nandana goes to the hotel where Shyam is staying to inform Shyam. CI Antony and his team arrest Nandana and Shyam following an anonymous message that there is disorder in the hotel. Although they were released, the news comes in the yellow papers. Soon, Ann and Susan finds that it was Preetha who sent the photos and called the police, in order to avenge Shyam's betrayal. Marriage with Ranjith and Nandana is decided. The film ends with the reunion between Ann and Shyam.

== Cast ==
- Prithviraj Sukumaran as Shyam Balagopal
- Jayasurya as Renjith
- Roma Asrani as Ann Mathew, Shyam's love interest (Voice over by Sreeja Ravi)
- Samvrutha Sunil as Nandana Bahuleyan
- Remya Nambeesan as Sussan Thomas
- Salim Kumar as Pappan
- Saiju Kurup as Manuel Abraham, Ann's ex groom
- Lalu Alex as Mathews, Ann's father
- Rajan P. Dev as Bahuleyan
- Vanitha Krishnachandran as Prof. Vanaja Balagopal, Shyam's mother
- Shari as Eleena John, College Principal
- Shahnu as Preetha K.V
- Bindu Panicker as Maria
- Anoop Chandran as Niyas
- Rony David as Sunil Abraham
- P. Sreekumar as Abraham
- Ambika Mohan as Rossie Abraham
- Gayathri as Prof. Ambily
- Manoj Guinness as Chakkyarkuthukaran
- Spadikam George as CI Anirudhan
- Sadiq as Police Officer Antony
- Subbalakshmi as Dance teacher
- Deepika Mohan as Nandana's mother

== Box office ==
The film was both commercial and critical success.

== Soundtrack ==
The film's music is by Alex Paul and the lyrics are by Vayalar Sarath Chandra Varma.

- "Kalkanda Malaye" – Rimi Tomy, Liji Francis, Akhila Anand
- "Chocolate" – M.G. Sreekumar, Rimi Tomy
- "Ishtamalle" – Shahabaz Aman
- "Tamarayum Sooryanum" – K. J. Yesudas
- "Tamarayum Sooryanum" – Jyotsna Radhakrishnan
