= Peruman railway accident =

1988 public transit disaster in Kollam, Kerala, India

Details
- Date: July 8 1988. 01:15 PM
- Location: Ashtamudi Lake, Kollam district, Kerala
- Coordinates: 09°07′00″N 76°29′00″E
- Country: India
- Line: Kollam – Ernakulam line between stations Kollam and Munrothuruthu
- Operator: Southern Railway Zone
- Incident type: Derailment
- Cause: Unknown

Statistics
- Trains: 1 (Number 26 Island Express)
- Vehicles: WDM-2 locomotive
- Deaths: 107
- Injured: 200

The Peruman railway accident occurred on 8 July 1988 when an Island Express train derailed on the Peruman bridge over Ashtamudi Lake in Kerala, India and fell into the water, killing 105 people. The cause was never established, but was blamed on track alignment and faulty wheels, possibly compounded by a failure to notify maintenance workers about the approach of a delayed train that had been making-up time by travelling at excessive speed.

== Derailment ==
The accident occurred at Peruman bridge over Ashtamudi Lake, Perinadu, Kollam, Kerala, at around 13:15 local time. Ten carriages of the Train Number 26 Island Express, travelling from Bangalore to Thiruvananthapuram Central, derailed and fell into the lake. Of the 14 coaches, only the engine, the parcel van and a second class compartment had crossed the bridge when the derailment occurred. Two of the nine coaches that fell into the water turned upside down.

== Rescue operations ==
The rescue operations began immediately as locals of Perumon and Munrothuruthu rushed to the scene. The injured were taken to Kollam's district hospital and nearby private clinics. Realising the scale of the tragedy, three helicopters and over 100 navy divers were also sent to the scene into from Cochin, 140 km away. Union Minister of State for Railways Madhavrao Scindia, accompanied by Railway Board members, flew down in a chartered plane to supervise the rescue operations. Scindia announced an ex-gratia payment of Rs. 1 lakh (100,000) each to relatives of each of the dead. The crash left 105 people dead and around 200 injured.

== Cause ==
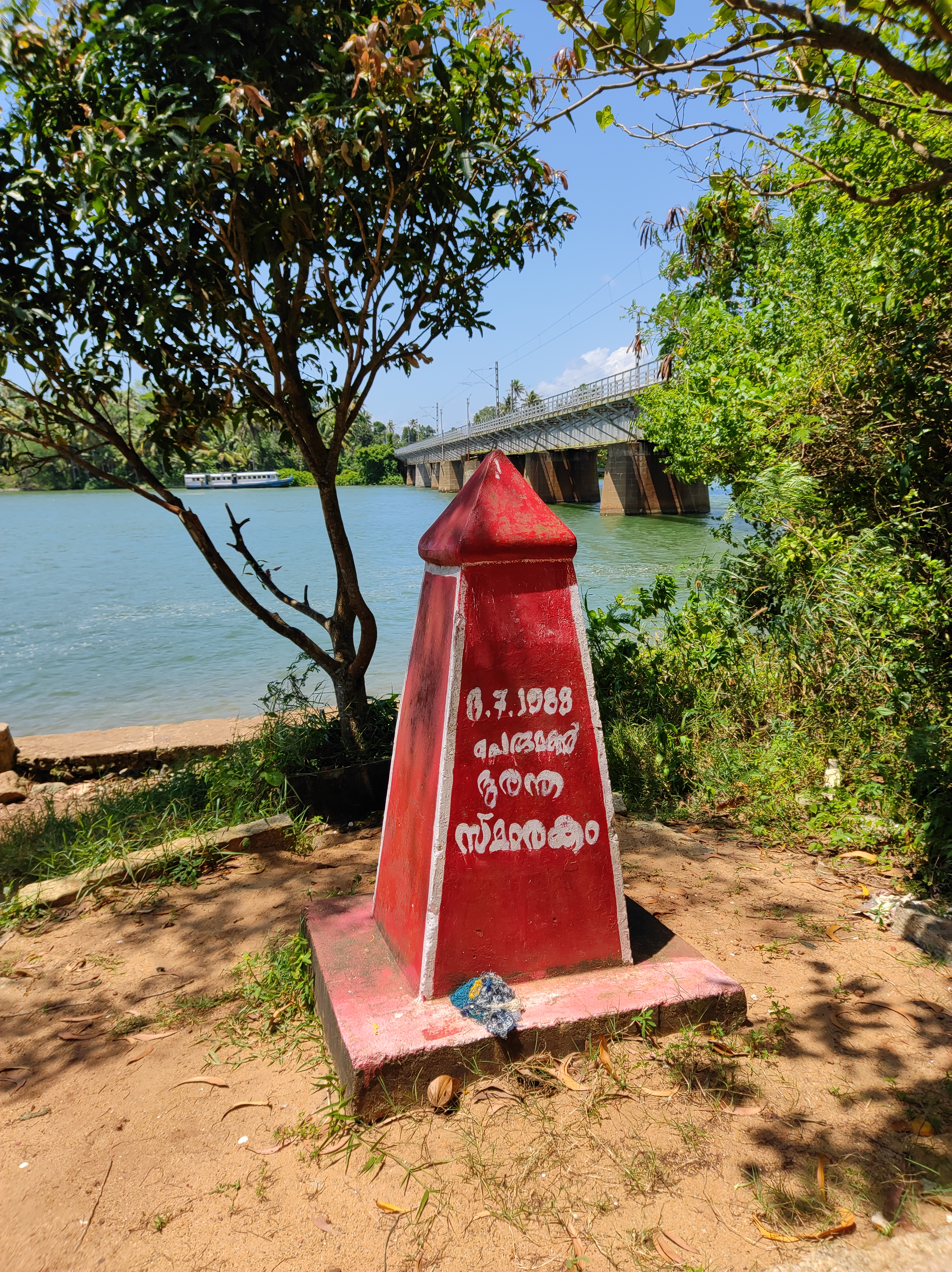
Perumon accident Memorial

The exact cause of the crash is still unknown.

Tornado

A first inquiry conducted by the Commissioner for Railway Safety attributed the cause of train accident to a tornado. This finding has been widely disputed by the general public.

Track alignment and faulty wheels

A second inquiry, prompted by public outrage, revealed that problems in track alignment and faulty wheels of coaches were responsible for the tragedy. The following possible causes, even though not officially acknowledged, have received widespread attention in media.

Speed

Some eyewitness are quoted saying that the train was running too fast for the bridge at the time of accident.

Track maintenance work

Some track maintenance may have been going on at the railway bridge. A report alleges the maintenance workers called up the nearest station and inquired about the passing trains. They were told that the Island Express which was due to pass is running late. The blog asserts the workers had lifted a section of rail and the repair was underway, then the workers went for a break, leaving the separated rail, assured that the train was not due. The train kept the right time and derailed on the bridge.

== In popular culture ==
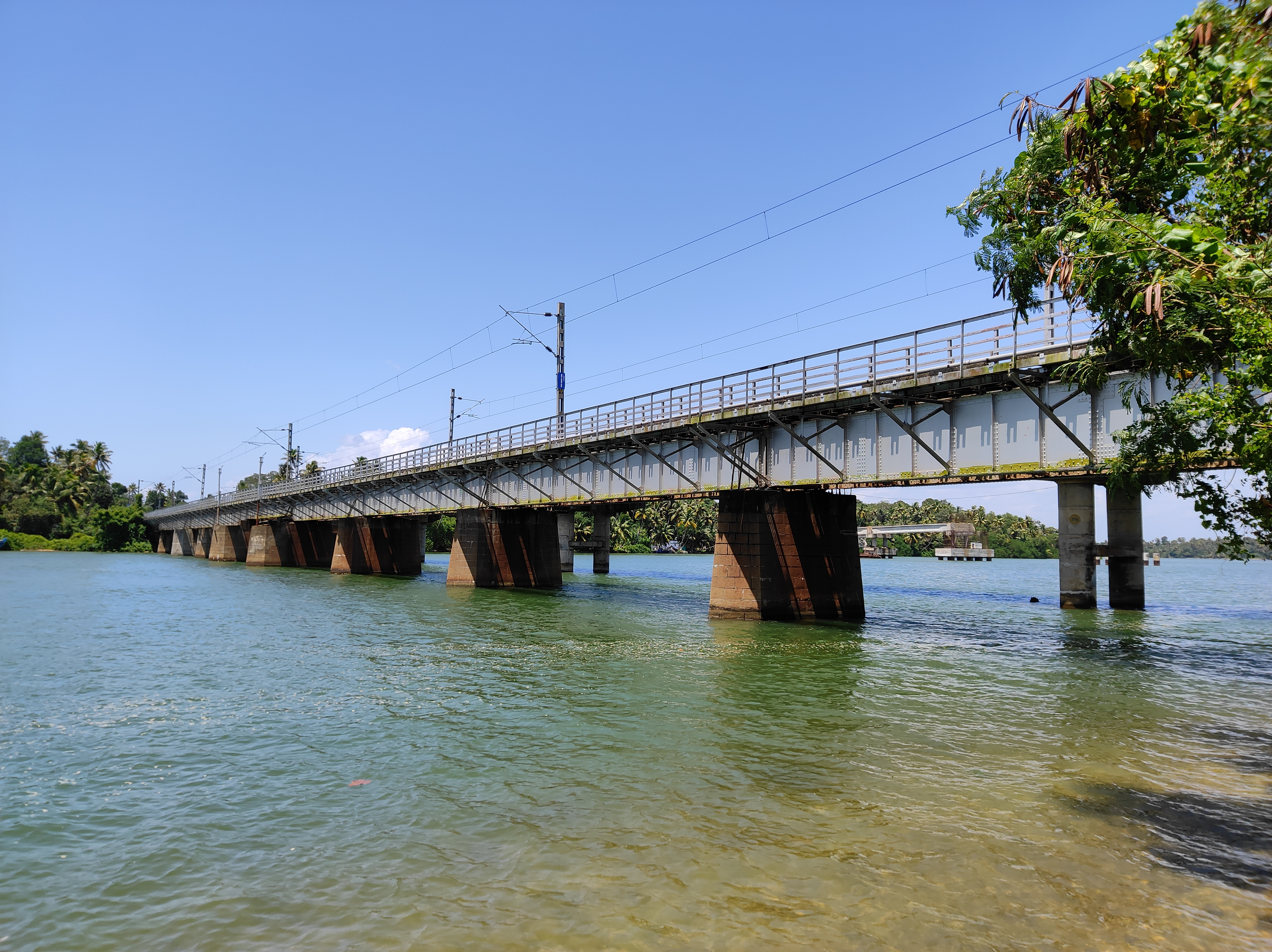
Perumon Old railway bridge which underwent accident

The crash was featured in the 1990 Malayalam movie Iyer the Great. The short film segment Island Express of film Kerala Cafe tells the story of different people and their journey after the crash. In the Malayalam movie Maheshum Marutiyum (2023), the protagonist's father dies in the derailment.

== See also ==
- List of Indian rail accidents
- Lists of rail accidents
