= Monster (2022 film) =

2022 film directed by Vysakh

- Theatrical release poster
- Directed by: Vysakh
- Written by: Udaykrishna
- Produced by: Antony Perumbavoor
- Starring: Mohanlal
- Cinematography: Satheesh Kurup
- Edited by: Shameer Muhammed
- Music by: Deepak Dev
- Production company: Aashirvad Cinemas
- Distributed by: Aashirvad Release
- Release date: 21 October 2022 (India)
- Running time: 135 minutes
- Country: India
- Language: Malayalam
- Box office: 6.95 crore

Monster is a 2022 Indian Malayalam-language crime mystery action thriller film directed by Vysakh, written by Udaykrishna and produced by Antony Perumbavoor. The film stars Mohanlal with Lakshmi Manchu, Honey Rose, Siddique, Sudev Nair, K. B. Ganesh Kumar, Lena, Johny Antony and Jagapathi Babu in a cameo appearance.

Principal photography for the film began in November 2021 and ended in January 2022, which took place extensively in Cochin. It is the second film of Mohanlal, Vysakh and Udaykrishna after Pulimurugan (2016). Monster was released theatrically on 21 October 2022 coinciding with the Diwali weekend. It received mixed-to-negative reviews from critics and audiences alike.

== Plot ==
Bhamini and Anil Chandra are a married couple who have a daughter named Kunjatta from Anil's first wife, and live a happy life with their caretaker Durga. Anil, who used to be a software engineer but was fired from his company, becomes a taxi driver to survive. However, Anil suffers a leg injury due to an accident, and Bhamini takes up his job and begins to take care of the family's finances. When Bhamini is about to leave to celebrate their first wedding anniversary, her boss tells her to pick up a passenger named Lucky Singh from airport. Bhamini reluctantly agrees and arrives at the airport. Bhamini meets Lucky Singh who shares his story on the way back, and tells her that he's in the city to sell a flat that belonged to his father.

Lucky Singh accompanies Bhamini to her house as the flat's buyers get delayed, and takes part in the anniversary celebrations. After receiving the money from the buyers, Lucky Singh requests Bhamini to deliver the money to his lawyer, citing other urgent work. When Bhamini leaves, Lucky Singh goes back and shoots Anil and records the shooting. Bhamini and Lucky Singh leave for the airport, with Lucky Singh stashing Anil's corpse in Bhamini's car. After reaching the airport, Lucky Singh leaves. Bhamini learns about Anil's and Kunjatta's disappearance, and is worried. Bhamini, along with Durga and Anil's friend complain to the police. C.I Mariyam George suspects Bhamini, as she always evaded vehicle checks.

S.P Joseph, Mariyam and his team checks Bhamini's flat where they find Anil's corpse in the car's trunk along with the video and a gun. The police interrogate Bhamini, who tells that her real name is Rosie and she was given the name by Anil after marriage. Mariyam and Joseph interrogate the flat's security guard and check the CCTV footage, but learn that nobody had accompanied Bhamini in the car and also learn about Lucky Singh and his lawyer. She subsequently learns that Lucky Singh and the lawyer are fake. Meanwhile, ADGP Chandrashekhar tells Joseph and Mariyam to produce Bhamini in court. When they arrive at the court, unknown men attack the convoy and take Bhamini. It is later revealed that these were Bhamini's own men, staging an abduction. Lucky Singh arrives at the place and fights off Bhamini's men. Bhamini manages to escape from the place.

Police brings in the original Lucky Singh who is the owner of the She-Taxi firm where Bhamini was working, and it is revealed that the man who was posing as Lucky Singh is actually an undercover IPS officer from the Central Government named Shivdev Subramaniam IPS who is the Additional Director of the Central Crime Branch, and who was tasked with nabbing Bhamini. Shivdev arrives at the commissioner's office and reveals that Bhamini was actually responsible for the murders of three men along with her secret crime accomplice. Their modus operandi was killing them on their first wedding anniversaries, by injecting a lethal drug and poison in the anniversary cake and stealing their insurance money, thereafter. Shivdev had learnt that Bhamini's next target was Anil, so he told Anil about Bhamini's crimes, who later cooperated to capture them. His accident was fake. Shivdev also had a hand in having Bhamini work as a taxi driver and had her to pick him at the airport. This was apparently to destroy the anniversary cake by pretending to play with Kunjatta, and destroy the plan of killing Anil. He had also faked Anil's death and trapped Bhamini in-order, to find her crime accomplice.

When Bhamini escapes from custody, Shivdev follows Bhamini and learns that her real name is Rebecca and her crime accomplice was actually Durga, whose real name is Catherine Alexandra. He confronts the duo and Rebecca reveals that she and Catherine were lesbians who fell in love during their childhood days in an orphanage. However, they were ostracized by the community and banished from the orphanage. In 2011, because Haryana passed legislation that shielded LGBT rights, they got married there. During their honeymoon, they were publicly humiliated by the local police force. Unable to bear further humiliation, they planned to move overseas, where they would have their rights. However, because they did not have enough money to move, they planned to steal insurance money of the four people. A fight ensues, where Shivdev defeats and subdues Catherine and Rebecca and arrests them.

== Cast ==
- Mohanlal as Lucky Singh (Fake)/ Shivdev Subramaniam (speculated) IPS, Additional Director of Central Crime Branch/ Agent X
- Lakshmi Manchu as Catherine Alexandra (Durga)
- Honey Rose as Rebbeca/ Bhaamini Anil Chandra/ Rosie/ Christina Luther/ Raziya Fathima/ Rakhi Thakur
- Sudev Nair as Anil Chandra, Bhamini's husband
- Siddique as ADGP Chandrashekhar IPS
- K. B. Ganesh Kumar as SP Joseph Cheriyan IPS
- Lena as CI Mariyam George
- Jess Sweejan as Kunjatta
- Kailash as Kailash
- Arjun Nandhakumar as Rashid Ahammed, Shivdev's team member
- Johny Antony as Varghese, Shivdev's team member/ Adv. Vasavan (Fake)
- Idavela Babu as Adv. Vasavan (Original)
- Nandu Pothuval as Juice shop owner
- Biju Pappan as CI Vijayakumar
- Swasika as Diana
- Anjali Nair as SI Gayathri
- Sadhika Venugopal as SI Soumya
- Manju Satheesh as Flat Caretaker Susan
- Laya Simpson as Laya / Jennifer, Shivdev's team member
- Jagapathi Babu as Lucky Singh (Original) (cameo appearance)

== Production ==
=== Development ===
Monster was announced by Mohanlal through his social media profiles on 10 November 2021, along with a poster crediting him as Lucky Singh, to be directed by Vysakh, written by Udaykrishna, and produced by Antony Perumbavoor. Filming also began on the same day. Vysakh said the idea came during the COVID-19 pandemic in India when large-scale productions, like his earlier collaborations with Udaykrishna, was difficult to execute. Hence, he thought of doing a film "that focused on the craft by using the strength of the content". He appreciated Mohanlal and Antony for taking the project, "they understood its merit from the point of view of artistes and stood by it. They could have rejected it and asked us to do a pure mass film, which we are experts at". According to Vysakh, the film falls under thriller genre. Mohanlal sees it as a crime-thriller. Udaykrishna said "it's an experimental film. I have kept aside the ingredients that are often seen in my movies for Monster, which is a thriller".

=== Casting ===
Mohanlal plays a turban-clad Lucky Singh. It was the first Punjabi character in his career. Telugu actress Lakshmi Manchu made her Malayalam debut with Monster. She took martial art lessons in kalaripayattu for her role. About her role, she that "it was an opportunity for me to push myself and step out of my comfort zone". Manchu was called for the role by Mohanlal. Sudev Nair also has a major role. Honey Rose plays Bhamini, whom she credited as one of the best characters she had done until then. Child actress Jess Sweejan plays the other important role. Lena, K. B. Ganesh Kumar, and Siddique also plays vital characters.

=== Filming ===
Principal photography began on 10 November 2021. Its first schedule was completed on 20 November. Filming was held at Kochi. Every personnel on set was subjected to COVID-19 testing and the film was shot within a controlled environment and had entry restriction. For two weeks, the film was shot inside a set at VVM Studios, Eloor. Mohanlal, Manchu, Rose, Nair, and Jess performed in these portions. Monster was shot extensively in Kochi. The whole filming lasted 55 days, which was wrapped in January 2022. It took another nine months for the release. According to Vysakh, the film required extensive post-production work compared to other films. Satheesh Kurup was the cinematographer, Shajie Naduvil was the art director, Shameer Muhammed was the editor, Sujith Sudhakaran designed the costumes, and Stunt Silva composed the actions.

== Music ==
The film's original music was composed, arranged, and programmed by Deepak Dev. Audio mixing was done at Dev's Wonderland studio in Dubai. It was mastered by Gethin John at Hafod Mastering studio in London. The soundtrack album was distributed by the label Aashirvad Audios and Videos.

Track listing
No.	Title	Lyrics	Singer(s)	Length
1.	"Ghoom Ghoom"	Tanishk Nabar, Hari Narayanan	Ali Quli Mirza, Prakash Babu, Zia Ul Haq	2:50
2.	"High on Desire"	George Peter	Sayanora Philip	3:00

== Release ==
=== Theatrical ===
In March 2022, Vysakh said that he was unaware of the film's release date and have not decided whether it should be released in theatres or OTT, which would be decided by the producer. He further added "I believe Monster will work both in theatres as well as OTT because of the strength of its content". In August, media reported a release date on 30 September 2022. It was later reported that it has been changed to 21 October to release around Diwali. The date was confirmed by Mohanlal in October, as a worldwide release.

=== Censorship ===
In India, Monster was rated UA by the Central Board of Film Certification, with a certified runtime of 135.26 minutes.

With only a few days left to release, the film was reportedly banned in all Gulf Cooperation Council (GCC) countries, except the United Arab Emirates (UAE) where decision was pending, citing the presence of LGBTQ content, thus failing to receive film certification. The makers re-submitted the film for certification after censoring the aforementioned scenes, which was due on 18 October. Bahrain lifted the ban after 13 minutes of the film was cut. Reportedly, the film had a delayed release in Gulf countries.

=== Home media ===
The digital rights of the film was acquired by Disney+ Hotstar and started streaming from 2 December 2022. The satellite rights of the film are owned by Asianet.

== Reception ==
=== Critical response ===
Monster received mixed reviews from critics.

Roktim Rajpal of India Today rated the film 2.5 out of 5 and wrote "Monster isn't really Mohanlal's best work by any stretch of the imagination. It, however, may have just about enough to satisfy the veteran star's ardent fans". Anjana George of The Times of India rated the film 2.0 out of 5 stars and wrote "The film is all about a monster who has the choice to use the trust of his fans to take up the Malayalam cinema or to bring it down". Padmakumar K of Onmanorama wrote that, 'The charming visuals and faces which fill the frames and an impactful BGM by Deepak Dev will keep viewers glued to the screen.'. S. R. Praveen on The Hindu called the film "an endurance test", criticising the writing, action, Mohanlal's character and his humor, as well as the depiction of LGBT characters; Cris from The News Minute voiced similar disapprovals. Sajin Shrijith of Cinema Express rated the film 0.5 out of 5 stars and wrote "Mohanlal said the film's screenplay is both hero and villain. Well, having seen the movie, I can say I understood half of it". Nidhima Taneja of The Print rated the film 1.5 out of 5 stars and wrote "Monster, performed by the cinema giant, does little to satiate your cinematic appetite. Perhaps, it should have been called off at the reading table". Anna M.M. Vetticad of Firstpost rated the film 0.25 out of 5 stars and wrote "Sikhs, Punjabis and homosexuals are not viewed as people by the team of Monster. Instead, they're seen as gimmicks, tools to build suspense and write grand reveals in a crime drama". Criticizing Mohanlal's acting and the "unfailingly superficial script", she noted that "The stereotyping of LGBT-plus persons (...) is unrelenting."
