= Madhura Raja =

2019 film by Vyshakh

- Theatrical release poster
- Directed by: Vysakh
- Written by: Udaykrishna
- Produced by: Nelson Ipe
- Starring: Mammootty; Jagapathi Babu; Jai; Anusree; Siddique; Nedumudi Venu; Vijayaraghavan; Salim Kumar
- Cinematography: Shaji Kumar
- Edited by: Mahesh Narayanan; Johnkutty; Sunil. S. Pillai
- Music by: Gopi Sundar
- Production company: Nelson Ipe Cinemas
- Distributed by: Zee Studios; UK Studios Release
- Release date: 12 April 2019 (India)
- Country: India
- Language: Malayalam
- Budget: ₹27 crore
- Box office: est. ₹104 crore

Madhura Raja (transl. King of Madurai) is a 2019 Indian Malayalam-language action comedy film directed by Vysakh, written by Udaykrishna and starring Mammootty, Jagapathi Babu and Jai alongside Anusree, Siddique, Nedumudi Venu, Vijayaraghavan, Salim Kumar, Mahima Nambiar, Anna Rajan and Shamna Kasim in supporting roles. The music is composed by Gopi Sundar. This film marks the debut of Jai in Malayalam cinema. The film is a spin-off to 2010 film Pokkiri Raja and Mammootty reprises his role as Raja.

The film received mixed to positive reviews from critics and audiences . Madhura Raja was released worldwide on 12 April 2019 two days before the Vishu holiday.

== Plot ==
Pambinthuruthu, an island village, is home to an illegal liquor brewer V.R. Nadesan. He brews alcohol using harmful materials and ships it from the island, the consumption of which often results in injuries and deaths. After one such incident kills 77 people in a nearby city, S.I Balachandran, an honest police officer, goes to arrest him. Upon his arrival, however, he is betrayed by his subordinates and mauled to death by Nadesan's hounds.

25 years later, Nadesan has amassed considerable wealth through his liquor production, which he operates under the façade of a glass bottle factory, along with several other establishments, including a school and a small clinic called "Nadesan Charity Hospital". He also runs a bar in front of the school, whose patrons frequently harass the staff and children. Based on complaints from the school staff, Madhavan Nair and Krishnan Nair visit Pambinthuruthu to investigate. Nadesan opposes them with the help of the current C.I. David, who arrests Krishnan Nair on a false charge of murdering an investigative journalist. Madhavan Nair calls his son Madhura Raja for help, who sends his adoptive brother Chinna. However, Chinna is soon arrested for attacking police officers. Madhura Raja arrives, having freed Krishnan Nair, and enlists the support of reformed City Police Commissioner Rajendra Babu to have C.I. David suspended.

Raja secures Chinna's release, sends his father Madhavan Nair and Krishnan Nair away, and stays back to confront Nadesan. Through ego clashes, both decide to contest the local assembly elections. Aware of his disadvantage as an outsider, Raja realizes it will be nearly impossible to win against Nadesan, who enjoys public support through his seemingly charitable institutions. Raja resolves to undermine Nadesan's falsely-earned goodwill, beginning with getting his illegal liquor distillery shut down. It is eventually revealed that Nadesan is actually involved in illegal organ trade, carried out through Nadesan Charity Hospital, which runs frequent free medical camps to secretly test for organ compatibility. The hospital deceives potential donors into admissions for surgery. The murdered journalist had been close to exposing this, leading to his death. Raja goes on to win the election in a landslide, ending the incumbent party’s winning streak of several terms.

An enraged Nadesan, who has lost public support due to the ousting of his illegal activities, lays a trap to murder Raja but ends up killing Chinna instead. He uses the same breed of hounds that killed S.I. Balachandran to murder Chinna and Lissy, the nurse who helped the journalist collect evidence of the organ trade. Upon learning of Chinna's death, a heart-broken and raging Raja single-handedly defeats Nadesan's men, and finally kills Nadesan the same way he killed Balachandran, Lissy, and Chinna.

Three months later, newly elected MLA Raja sets out on his ambition of becoming a minister, hinting at another sequel.

== Cast ==
- Mammootty as Madhura Raja
- Jagapathi Babu as V.R. Nadesan
- Jai as Chinnan
- Anusree as Vasanthi, Balachandran's Elder Daughter
- Siddique as City Police Commissioner Rajendra Babu IPS, Raja's Friend
- Nedumudi Venu as Kunnath Madhavan Nair, Raja's Father
- Vijayaraghavan as Kunnath Krishnan Nair, Raja's Uncle
- Salim Kumar as Manoharan Mangalodayam
- Charan Raj as Maniyannan, Chinnan's Father
- Mahima Nambiar as Meenakshi, Vasanthi's Sister, Balachandran's Youngest Daughter & Chinnan's Lover
- Shamna Kasim as Amala, Krishnan's Daughter
- Anna Rajan as Lissy, Poulo's Daughter
- Vinaya Prasad as Lillykutty Teacher, Krishnan's Wife
- Thesni Khan as Ramani, Manoharan's Wife
- Santhosh Keezhattoor as Constable Poulo Varghese, Lissy's Father
- Aju Varghese as Suru
- Baiju Ezhupunna as Chandru
- Noby Marcose as Pothan
- Bijukuttan as Vasu
- Ramesh Pisharody as Raja's Cameraman
- Kalabhavan Shajohn as Peruchazhi Perumal
- Balachandran Chullikkadu as Mohandas, Raja's Lawyer
- M. R. Gopakumar as Gopalan
- Kailash as Rasool, Lissy's and Amala's Friend
- G. Suresh Kumar as Minister Koshy
- R. K. Suresh as CI David
- Jayan Cherthala as Constable Chandramohan / Chandran, Nadeshan's Left Hand & Henchman
- Baiju V. K. as SI Raveendran
- Chali Pala as Udumbu Vasu
- Kozhikode Narayanan Nair as NCS Member
- Abu Salim as Nateshan's Henchman
- Narain as SI Balachandran (Cameo appearance)
- Suraj Venjaramoodu as CI Idivettu Sugunan (Cameo Appearance)
- Parvathy Nambiar as Daisy, Balachandran's Wife (Cameo Appearance)
- Sunny Leone as herself (Cameo appearance in item song "Moha Mundiri")
- Naslen (Junior artist)

== Production ==
Madhura Raja was produced by Nelson Ipe under the banner Nelson Ipe Cinemas, made on a budget of ₹27 crore. The principal production commenced in Cochin in August 2018. Mammootty reprises the role Raja he played in the 2010 film Pokkiri Raja. Tamil actor Jai also plays an important character, and Madhura Raja marks his debut in Malayalam cinema. Vysakh retained Shaji Kumar and Johnkutty, who did cinematography and editing after cinema Odiyan. The action choreographer of the film was Peter Hein, who had worked previously with Vysakh in Pulimurugan (2016). Filming was completed in three schedules with the second schedule being wrapped up in December 2018.

== Release ==
=== Theatrical ===
The film got released in theatres on 12 April 2019. In the USA, the film secured the second biggest release for a Malayalam film with 58 locations. At USA, UAE and UK box office, the film got released in 216 locations.

== Reception ==
=== Box office ===
The film collected ₹9.5 crores in opening day in Worldwide box office. The opening day in UAE gross of ₹3.03 cr is Mammootty's career-best in the region. In Tamil Nadu, the film has garnered close to ₹36 lakhs gross in three days, which is again the best opening for Mammootty. The film's three-day total from Bengaluru stands at a whopping ₹48.27 lakhs, making it the third highest grosser in the city that year.

In 17 days, it grossed $1.822 million (₹12.72 crore) from overseas territories (of which $1.65 million (₹11.5 crore) was from UAE-GCC region alone). As of 21 June, Madhura Raja is the fifth best Malayalam grosser of 2019 outside Kerala.

In the opening weekend, it grossed $772,092 in the UAE (best grosser of that weekend), $32,989 (₹22.88 lakh) in the US, $9,900 (₹6.87 lakh) in Canada, £8,007 (₹7.27 lakh) in the UK, A$10,869 (₹5.41 lakh) in Australia, and NZ$3,708 (₹1.73 lakh) in New Zealand. And grossed $1,024,670 in the UAE and A$19,855 (₹9.79 lakh) in Australia in three weeks, $13,392 (₹9.3 lakh) in Canada in four weeks, and £34,334 (₹31.32 lakh) in the UK in five weeks.

The film's Telugu version called Raja Narasimha ran for 75 days in Andhra Pradesh box office.

The film's final collection grossed over ₹125 crore from worldwide box office in its final run. The film ran 150 days in theatres.

=== Critical response ===
Sify rated the film 3 out of 5 stars and called it as a Masala Entertainer and wrote: "Madhura Raja is no less than a treat for the fans of Mammootty. It's a fun ride that can be watched with a tub of popcorn. Go for it!".

== Future ==
The first film released of the Raja Series was Pokkiri Raja in 2010. The next sequel of the series is Madhura Raja in 2019. The third one of the series has been announced and titled Minister Raja.

== Music ==
Madhura Raja

Soundtrack album by Gopi Sundar
- Released: 14 February 2019
- Recorded: 2018–19
- Length: 9:46
- Label: Zee Music
External audio
- Audio Jukebox on YouTube

The film's music is composed by Gopi Sundar. The soundtrack was launched on 14 February 2019.

Track list
No.	Title	Lyrics	Singer(s)	Length
1.	"Kandille Kandille"	Murukan Kattakada	Anwar Sadath, Divya. S. Menon	4:03
2.	"Raaja Raaja Raaja"	Dev Habibullah	Gopi Sundar	2:08
3.	"Moha Mundiri"	B. K. Harinarayanan	Sithara Krishnakumar	3:35
Total length:				9:46
