= Pokkiri Raja (2010 film) =

2010 Indian film by Vysakh

- Promotional poster
- Directed by: Vysakh
- Written by: Udaykrishna; Sibi K. Thomas
- Produced by: Tomichan Mulakupadam
- Starring: Mammootty; Prithviraj Sukumaran
- Cinematography: Shaji Kumar
- Edited by: Mahesh Narayanan
- Music by: Score; C. Rajamani; Songs; Jassie Gift
- Production company: Mulakuppadam Films
- Distributed by: Mulakuppadam Release
- Release date: 7 May 2010 (India)
- Running time: 165 minutes
- Country: India
- Language: Malayalam

Pokkiri Raja (transl. Rogue King) is a 2010 Indian Malayalam-language action comedy film written by Udaykrishna–Sibi K. Thomas and directed by Vysakh (in his directorial debut). The film stars Mammootty in the titular role with Prithviraj Sukumaran, alongside a supporting cast of Shriya Saran, Siddique, Nedumudi Venu, Vijayaraghavan, Suraj Venjaramoodu, Salim Kumar and Riyaz Khan. The film marks the debut of Shriya Saran in Malayalam cinema

Pokkiri Raja was released worldwide on 7 May 2010 to positive reviews from critics and became the highest grossing Malayalam film of 2010. It was remade in Hindi as Boss. The film was dubbed and released in Tamil as Raja Pokkiri Raja. A sequel titled Madhura Raja was released on 12 April 2019.

== Plot ==
Kunnath Madhavan Nair, a teacher living happily with his two sons, Raja and Surya Narayanan, accidentally kills a boy named Gopi, who belongs to a rival family. Raja takes the blame to save Madhavan. Despite Raja getting released from prison, Madhavan refuses to accept him not knowing about his innocence and after he fights back Gopi's relatives as they try to kill him. Raja leaves for Madurai and saves Chinnan, the son of the village landlord Mani. Due to this, Raja turns into his right-hand and becomes Madurai Raja.

Years later, Raja becomes a powerful gangster called Pokkiri Raja, while Surya is an educated person and is also well known for getting involved in fights. To change his character, Surya is sent to Ernakulam to his brother-in-law SI Sugunan, a policeman who gets scared easily. At Ernakulam, Surya falls in love with Aswathy, the daughter of the city police commissioner Rajendra Babu. Sugunan takes advantage of Surya's character and sends him in his uniform to take care of dangerous police cases.

Meanwhile, Surya follows Aswathy, but is unaware that Home Minister Kumaran's son Mahendran is also in love with Aswathy. Aswathy hates Surya as she assumes that he is a cop, but she tells him that Rajendra Babu is her step-father and was the person behind her mother's death. Rajendra Babu have left her alive because Mahendran was in love with her. Rajendra Babu and Mahendran learns of Surya's and Aswathy's relationship, where they arrests Surya on false charges.

Rajendra Babu and Mahendran also plan to kill Surya and gives the contract to Raja. At this point, Madhavan goes to Madurai in search of Raja and asks for his help to rescue Surya. Realizing that Surya is his brother, Raja rescues Surya and warns Rajendra Babu. Raja and Surya crosses many hurdles and manages to defeat Rajendra Babu and Mahendran, but they spare them. The story ends with Surya reuniting with Aswathy and the two getting married with the help of Raja.

== Cast ==
- Mammootty as Kunnath Raja / Madhura Raja (Pokkiri Raja)
  - Ashwin C. Menon as Young Raja
- Prithviraj Sukumaran as Kunnath Surya Narayanan, Raja's brother
  - Jeevan Gopal as Young Surya
- Shriya Saran as Aswathy, Surya's love interest
- Nedumudi Venu as Kunnath Madhavan Nair, Raja's and Surya's father
- Vijayaraghavan as Kunnath Krishnan Nair, Raja's and Surya's uncle
- Siddique as City Police Commissioner Rajendra Babu IPS
- Riyaz Khan as Mahendran, Aswathy's fiancé and Kumaran's son
- Suraj Venjaramoodu as SI 'Idivettu' Sugunan.P, Raja's and Surya's brother in law
- Salim Kumar as Novelist Manoharan Mangalodayam
- Charan Raj as Maniyannan
- Bindu Panicker as Rugmini, Suganan's wife, Raja's and Surya's sister
- Thesni Khan as Ramani, Manoharan's wife
- Ambika Mohan as Lathika, Raja's and Surya's mother
- Delhi Ganesh as Velu, Raja's assistant
- Karate Raja as Selva, Raja's assistant
- Santhosh Jogi as Sathya, Raja's assistant
- Baiju Ezhupunna as Chandru, Raja's assistant
- Rizabawa as Home Minister Kumaran, Mahendran's father
- Ponnamma Babu as Kumaran's wife and Mahendran's mother
- Anil Murali as CI Dinesh Menon
- Sadiq as SI Raveendranath
- Urmila Unni as Aswathy's mother
- Arun as Varun
- Kalabhavan Shajohn as SI Thomas
- Joemon Joshy as Gopi
- Jagannatha Varma as Thirumeni
- Kozhikode Narayanan Nair as Poojari Narayanan
- T. P. Madhavan as Shivankutty, Temple Committee Member
- Kadhal Dhandapani as Parthasarathy
- Abu Salim as Quotation Vasu
- Kalashala Babu as Achuthan Nair
- Kundara Johny as Raghavan, Achuthan's son
- Santhosh as Divakaran, Achuthan's second son
- Baburaj as Unnithan, Varun's brother
- Kanya Bharathi as Malini, Rajendra Babu's wife
- Paravai Muniyamma
- Sasi Kalinga as Police officer Rakesh Tiwari
- Mafia Sasi as King Murugan
- Shweta Menon in a guest appearance in a item songManikyakallin
- Rachana Maurya as a bar dancer (Cameo appearance in the item song "Chenthengil Ponnilaneeru")

== Production ==
The film was launched by Mammootty with the absence of Prithviraj and Shriya Saran at Changanassery on 30 December 2009. Veteran director Joshiy lighted the ceremonial lamp at the function. Shooting of the film began on 11 January 2010 at various locations in Kollengode, Chittur, Pollachi, Ottapalam and Ernakulam. Prithviraj's song 'Manikyakallin Mukkuticharhtum' song was first shot. The shooting completed within 50 days with a production cost around 5 crores and distribution works started in April. Audio was launched in April at Ernakulam. The dubbing of the film was happen at Kochi. A song was planned to shoot at London featuring the lead pair Prithviraj and Saran but had to cancelled because of volcanic ash from london has stopped the airport from fly in or out any flight. Saran was stranded with Arya at London while shooting for their film Chikku Bukku.

== Music ==
The music is composed by Jassie Gift and Theme music by Rajamani. The album contains 6 songs. The songs will be featured throughout the film except the other version of Ketile Kettile song. Kaithapram contributed the lyrics. This audio was released on 8 April 2010.

All lyrics are written by Kaithapram.

Track listing
No.	Title	Singer(s)	Length
1.	"Manikinavain"	K. J. Yesudas, Sujatha Mohan	3:12
2.	"Kettille, Kettille"	Vijay Yesudas, Prithviraj Sukumaran, Rijiya Riyas, Anwar Sadat	3:25
3.	"Manickya Kallil"	Jassie Gift, Malathy, Ananthu	4:00
4.	"Chenthengil Ponnilaneeru"	Ranjith, Anwar Sadat, Suchitra	3:50
5.	"Pokkiri Raja Theme"
6.	Untitled	Rajamani, Chorus

== Release ==
The film was released in 110 screens in India.

== Reception ==
=== Box office ===
The film was made on a budget of ₹4.25 crore and collected around ₹20.5 crore at the Kerala box office. The film became a major commercial success and was the highest grossing Malayalam film of 2010.

=== Critical response ===
Paresh C. Palicha of Rediff gave 2 out of 5 stars and wrote "Finally, Pokkiriraja may supposedly achieve the super hit status with the help of the fans. But, for the genuine viewer, it is a disappointment". Sify called it "mass masala" and commented as it doesn't have a decent storyline but appreciating the visuals. And said the writers have succeeded in allotting equal importance to both the lead actors. But criticized the lack of logic in the script.

== Sequels ==
A sequel-off titled Madhura Raja was released on 12 April 2019, which grossed over ₹75 crore at the box office. The third installment of the film has been announced and titled as Minister Raja.

== Remake ==
The film was later remade into Hindi as Boss and partially in Telugu as Bhai.
