= Robin Hood (2009 film) =

- Theatrical release poster
- Directed by: Joshiy
- Written by: Sachi-Sethu
- Produced by: Santha Murali; P. K. Muralidharan
- Starring: Prithviraj Sukumaran; Narain; Jayasurya; Biju Menon
- Cinematography: Shaji Kumar
- Edited by: Ranjan Abraham
- Music by: M. Jayachandran; C. Rajamani (Score)
- Production company: Anantha Vision
- Release date: 24 September 2009
- Running time: 142 minutes
- Country: India
- Language: Malayalam

Robinhood: Prince of Thieves, simply known as Robin Hood, is a 2009 Indian Malayalam-language action thriller film directed by Joshiy, written by the Sachi-Sethu duo and produced by Santha Murali and P. K. Muralidharan under Anantha Vision. The film stars Prithviraj Sukumaran in the lead role, alongside Narain, Jayasurya, Biju Menon, Bhavana and Samvrutha Sunil. The title of the movie was inspired from the Hollywood movie (Robin Hood: Prince of Thieves) of the same name released in the year 1991.

Robin Hood was released on 24 September 2009 to mixed reviews from critics and became commercially successful at the box office.

== Plot ==
Venkatesh Iyer alias Venky, a physics entrance coaching professor, moonlights as a robber and robs ATMs of the Imperial Bank of India (IBI). Pursuant to a string of such robberies, a police squad headed by ACP Harris Mohammed is put into action. Unhappy with the progress of the investigation and disturbed by the mounting pressure from the public, Nandakumar Menon, the Executive Director of IBI, hires a sharp private investigator Alexander Felix, who along with Roopa, the senior systems manager of the Bank, begins an investigation. Harris and Felix are later revealed to be prior acquaintances with some rivalry between them.

In the meantime, Abhirami, one of Venkatesh's students, falls in love with him. Venky continues to commit the robberies and triggers the customers towards mounting more pressure on the bank, triggering a series of closure of accounts. Adopting a number of novel tactics, Felix uncovers the methodology being adopted by the robber. He also uncovers Venky as the perpetrator and threatens to hand him and Roopa, whom Felix reveals as Venky's accomplice and lover, to the police. But Venky reveals his past.

Venky's real name is revealed to be Siddharth, who was a former systems manager working with IBI. His father Vaidyanathan was an upright senior IAS officer. One day, while checking the system for some faults, he found that crores of the bank's funds had been siphoned off. He reported this scam to Menon, who was the GM of the Bank. Menon, who happened to be the brain behind the scam, fabricated evidence to get Siddharth arrested. His father got an attack and was paralyzed, prompting Siddharth to seek revenge by means of the robberies.

After learning the truth, Felix teams up with Siddharth and Roopa. He meets Menon in isolation and tries to coerce him into accepting the blame for his actions, but is stabbed and thrown into the sea. The next day, Siddharth is brought handcuffed by Harris to Menon's guest house, where Menon is in the process of giving funds to a minister for the forthcoming elections. Initially feeling elated, Menon is shocked when Harris accuses him of being the brain behind the series of ATM robbery and subsequent search at the guest house leads to all the machinery used by Siddharth for the robberies being found from over there. The money being provided to the minister is also revealed as the money robbed from the ATMs.

Shocked to the core, Menon is flabbergasted. In a small flashback, it is revealed that Siddharth had followed Felix, seen him getting stabbed and rescued him, whereupon Felix had given a statement to the police that he had found out about Menon being the brain behind the ATM robberies. Also, Siddharth had visited Harris and offered the evidence he had against Menon about his involvement in the previous fraud for which he got Siddharth jailed. It is also revealed that Menon's secretary Meera, who was honest and friends with Roopa and Siddharth, had helped them switch the money and place the equipment in Menon's guest house. As Menon is being arrested and led away, he states to Siddharth that not killing him and his whole family was his only mistake, whereupon the enraged Siddharth moves to slap and attack him, but is restrained by Harris. As his name has been cleared, Siddharth starts a new life with Roopa and Felix meets them a few months later, wherein the three begin to have a good party, and the film ends.

== Cast ==
- Prithviraj Sukumaran as Siddharth / Venkatesh Iyer
- Narain as Alexander Felix, Private Detective
- Jayasurya as ACP N Harris Mohammed IPS
- Biju Menon as T. Nandakumara Menon, Chairman of IBI Bank and 2Day Builders
- Bhavana as Roopalakshmi
- Samvrutha Sunil as Abhirami Sundaram
- P. Sreekumar as G. Sundaram, IBI Bank Zonal Manager and Abhirami's father
- Lena as Meera
- Salim Kumar as Nassar
- Janardhanan as G. Vaidyanathan IAS, Siddharth's father
- Jaffar Idukki as Sunny
- Nandu Poduval as Govindan, Minister's P.A
- Shobha Mohan as Radhika, Siddharth's mother
- T. P. Madhavan as Minister Manjooran
- Pratheesh Nandan as Jithesh
- Pawan as a local goon
- Chali Pala as CI Sukumaran
- Anil Murali as CI Gopi
- Sudhi Koppa as Anil
- Vysakh as a channel reporter

== Soundtrack ==
Music: M. Jayachandran; lyrics: Kaithapram Damodaran

- "Jaalam Maayaajaalam" - Shaan, Abu Murali
- "Parannu Vanna Painkili" - Benny Dayal, Achu, Suchithra
- "Ponnalle" - Jassie Gift
- "Priyanu Matram" - Shweta Mohan, Vijay Yesudas

== Reception ==
Paresh C Palicha of Rediff gave 2/5 stars and wrote "Robinhood falls short of expectations and will depend on Prithviraj's fans to make it a success."
