= Doubles (2011 film) =

2011 Pan Indian film by Sohan Seenulal

- Theatrical release poster
- Directed by: Sohan Seenulal
- Written by: Sachi-Sethu
- Produced by: K. K. Narayanadas
- Starring: Mammootty; Nadia Moidu; Taapsee
- Cinematography: P. Sukumar
- Edited by: V. Sajan
- Music by: James Vasanthan
- Production company: Reels on Wheels
- Distributed by: Plaza Group of Release
- Release date: 14 April 2011
- Country: India
- Language: Malayalam

Doubles is a 2011 Malayalam-language action comedy drama film directed by debutant Sohan Seenulal and written by the Sachi-Sethu duo. It stars Mammootty, Nadhiya Moidu and Taapsee, with Saiju Kurup, Anoop Chandran, Bijukuttan, Suraj Venjaramoodu, Anandaraj, Suresh and Avinash in other roles. It also features Roma and Rima Kallingal in cameo roles, and music by James Vasanthan. The film marks the comeback of Nadhiya and the debuts of Taapsee Pannu and Avinash in Malayalam cinema. The film released coinciding with the festival of Vishu on 14 April 2011. Doubles is a story of two siblings who rescue victims of road accidents.

== Plot ==
Doubles tells the story of fraternal twin siblings Giri (Mammootty) and Gowri (Nadia Moidu) run an accident rescue service in Puducherry in memory of their parents, who died in a road crash when they were young. The close-knit pair remain unmarried and inseparable until they rescue a mysterious, veiled young woman named Saira Banu (Taapsee Pannu) from an accident. As Saira's identity stays hidden behind a purdah and comedic chaos ensues among the men trying to catch a glimpse of her, Giri uncovers a twist: Saira's accident was actually engineered by Gowri's fiancé, Mishal, upending the siblings' lives.

== Cast ==
- Mammootty as Giri
  - Tejus Ameer as Young Giri
- Nadia Moidu as Gowri
  - Raihana Mariyam as Young Gowri
- Taapsee Pannu as Saira Banu
- Suresh as Mishal Pierre
- Saiju Kurup as Sameer
- Anoop Chandran as Susheelan
- Bijukuttan as Joji
- Suraj Venjaramoodu as Adv. Lawrence
- Salim Kumar as SI P.P Joseph (Mayyazhi)
- Anandaraj as Patan
- Avinash as Louie
- Y. G. Mahendra as Pierre Sayippu
- Narayanan Kutty as Mukundan
- Geetha Vijayan as Giri's and Gowri's mother
- Anita Alex as Gowri's daughter
- Joju George as a doctor
- Abu Salim
- Jaya Menon
- Kiran Rathod (cameo)
- Roma (cameo)
- Rima Kallingal (cameo)
- Sruthi Ramakrishnan as Dr. Beena (cameo)

== Production ==
Doubles is the directorial debut of Sohan Seenulal. Seenulal had previously worked as an assistant director for many films including three starring Mammootty. It was during the filming of Mayavi (2007) that Seenulal approached Mammootty with the intention of making a film with him in the lead. Nadia Moidu, who was one of the most adored actresses of Malayalam cinema of all time, makes her comeback in Malayalam with this film. Mammootty and Nadia had earlier worked in Shyama (1986) and Poovinu Puthiya Poonthennal (1986). Both the actors were working together again after nearly quarter of a century. Originally planned to begin on 15 November 2010.

== Music ==
The soundtrack was composed by James Vasanthan.

- "Aaru Nee Arike" – Hariharan
- "Kiliyamma Koodu Koottum" – Deepa Miriam, Karthik
- "Chaattamazhayo" – Sangeetha Sajith
- "Vedaanthame Doore" – Benny Dayal

== Release ==
=== Theatrical ===
The film released coinciding with the festival of Vishu on 14 April 2011.

== Reception ==
=== Critical reception ===
Paresh C. Pallicha of Rediff.com rated the movie two in a scale of five and stated, "On the whole, Doubles has fallen to the level of a never-ending tacky television serial." Keerthi Ramachandran of Deccan Chronicle stated, "Doubles was more like a plot done in impromptu. With a very thin storyline of two siblings running an accident rescue service in Puducherry after their parents bled to death in a road accident, goes on to have a totally unrelated story behind." She also criticized the technical aspects of the film. Veeyen of Nowrunning.com rated the film 1.5 in a scale of five and said, "Doubles offers a desultory tour through streets that you have been through several times before. It's a dreary drama that has been dipped in the mundane. So, the disappointments are double, the predictability double and the corniness even more than double." The reviewer of Sify.com stated, "This one has been a disappointment, nothing less."

=== Box office ===
The film was commercial failure in Kerala box office but its Tamil version Puduvai Managaram was commercial success in Tamil Nadu box office and it ran over 50 days in theatres.
