= Venicile Vyapari =

- Directed by: Shafi
- Written by: James Albert
- Produced by: Madhavan Nair
- Starring: Mammootty; Kavya Madhavan; Poonam Bajwa; Suraj Venjaramoodu; Salim Kumar; Guinness Pakru; Vijayaraghavan; Suresh Krishna
- Cinematography: Shamdat Sainudeen
- Edited by: Manoj
- Music by: Bijibal
- Distributed by: Murali Films; PJ Entertainments
- Release date: 16 December 2011
- Country: India
- Language: Malayalam

Venicile Vyapari, (transl. The Merchant of Venice) is a 2011 Indian Malayalam-language period action-romantic comedy film directed by Shafi, starring Mammootty, Kavya Madhavan and Poonam Bajwa. The film's plot unfolds in Alappuzha, a town in Kerala popularly known as the Venice of the East. Written by James Albert, the story follows a murder mystery.

== Plot ==
Set in the period of 1980. The story revolves around Pavithran who lost his parents in his childhood. He enters the police force by chance, though it is not his ambition. Pavithran lands up in Alappuzha (Alappuzha incidentally is attributed to the sobriquet, Venice of the East) disguised as a merchant to investigate the murder of a union leader named Ajayan. Another character is Ammu, the leader of the union of coir workers, who is in love with Pavithran.

== Cast ==
- Mammootty
- Kavya Madhavan as Ammu
- Poonam Bajwa as Mahalakshmi
- Suraj Venjaramoodu as Chandran Pillai (Odiyan Chandu)
- Jagathy Sreekumar as "Kaladi" Govindan, Ammu's father
- Salim Kumar as Kamalasanan / Al-Kamalasanan
- Janardhanan as SP Raghurama Varma IPS, Mahalakshmi's father
- Guinness Pakru as Kochukrishnan
- Vijayaraghavan as Chungathara Raghavan
- Suresh Krishna as Chungathara Aniyan
- V. K. Sreeraman as Aali Koya
- Abu Salim as Abdu
- Vijaya Rangaraju
- Ajith Kollam
- Kalabhavan Shajohn as Panchayat President "Isthiri" Lonappan
- Kundara Johny as SI K. Nambeeshan
- Santhosh as CI Karikkan George
- Anjali Nair as Ammu's friend
- Saju Kodiyan as Constable Sunil
- Biju Menon as Sakhavu Ajayan, Ammu's brother (cameo appearance)

== Production ==
The film was produced by Madhavan Nair under the banner of Murali Films. Mammootty stars in the film with Vijayaraghavan, Jagathy Sreekumar, Salim Kumar, Suraj Venjaramoodu, Sreeraman, Kalabhavan Shajohn, and Rajan Padoor form the supporting cast.

The shooting commenced in August 2011, and the film was mostly shot in Alappuzha. The song "Kannum Kannum" was shot in Ooty.

The film was scheduled to release on 4 November 2011, but was postponed to 11 November 2011 since there was a delay in the post-production work. The release was postponed again to 16 December 2011 due to a film strike in Kerala.

== Reception ==
Sify movies gave the film a rating of 2.5/5, criticising the script.

== Legacy ==
The film was a box office underperformer, but the film still have high repeat value. The character Al-Kamalasanan, played by Salim Kumar became a cult fan following and is popular in trolls and memes. The character still have fans across kerala. Additionally, the character Odiyan Chandhu played by Suraj Venjaramoodu became popular in social media, after the success of Lokah Chapter 1: Chandra, in which Dulquer Salman portrayed Charlie, an Odiyan. It was also popularized after the release of Odiyan, starring Mohanlal in the lead role.

== Music ==
Bijibal composed the music for the film which has lyrics by Kaithapram. The film has a remix of the song "Kannum Kannum" from the 1980 film Angadi. Mammootty stated that it was director Shafi's desire to use a hit song of the eighties in a dream scene of the film.
