= Sound Thoma =

- Theatrical Release Poster
- Directed by: Vysakh
- Written by: Benny P Nayarambalam
- Produced by: Anoop
- Starring: Dileep; Sai Kumar; Mukesh; Namitha Pramod; Subbaraju
- Cinematography: Shaji Kumar
- Edited by: Mahesh Narayanan
- Music by: Gopi Sundar
- Production company: Priyanjali Films
- Distributed by: Manjunatha
- Release date: 5 April 2013
- Country: India
- Language: Malayalam

Sound Thoma is a 2013 Malayalam-language action comedy film directed by Vysakh. It features Dileep in the title role as a man with cleft lip and a defective voice, while Namitha Pramod, Mukesh, Sai Kumar, Shiju, Nedumudi Venu and Subbaraju portray supporting roles. The film, produced by Anoop, features background score and soundtrack composed by Gopi Sundar and the lyrics were written by Rajeev Alunkal and Nadirsha.Edited and Cinematography handled by Mahesh Narayanan and Shaji Kumar.

== Plot ==
The story starts with Plapparambil family. It tells the family life of Plapparambil Paulo, a ruthless and miser moneylender, who has three children named Mathai, Joykutty and Thoma. Mathai, the eldest son, is thrown out by Paulo as he converted into Islam to marry his lover Amina. He is enough educated and was running their own jewellery shop, which was later held by Joykutty, the second son who is an MBA graduate. Thoma, the youngest son has a cleft lip and defective voice, but he still loves to sing.

Paulo and his family is hated by the locals of the Kuttanadu region. Thoma is in a one-sided love with Sreelakshmi, the daughter of Shankaran Bhagavathar, a music teacher who is also one among the creditor of Paulo and the neighbour of Mathai. Bhagavathar and even Sreelakshmi hates the family thus she rejects the love of Thoma. Here arrive an SI named Rakesh who has an old score with Paulo as his father Raghavan Panicker is ashamed in front of the local after he is arrested by the police on an embezzlement years ago. He vows to destroy the Plapparambil family. Thoma decides to overwrite the dislike of the locals towards his family by forcing Paulo to conduct a mass marriage of five orphaned girls so that both, the dislike by locals to the family can be removed and Joykutty will get better alliances from better family, thus Paulo would be able to fetch his target of 2 crores. Paulo reluctantly accepts the idea.

On the day of the marriage, everything goes well but one of orphan girl Sindhu's groom Vishambharan runs away from the marriage as his father threatens him that. Thoma tries to tell that anybody else who came to see the marriage can marry her. But some people leaves the place. The Panchayat President Mahadevan tells Paulo to marry one of his son to Sindhu. They selects Joykutty to marry her but Paulo refuses to it. Paulo's assistant Urupadi accidentally tells everyone about their plan to change the dislike of the villagers towards him and to get Joykutty married for two crores. Paulo angrily slaps Urupadi for telling their plan to everyone. The villagers gets angry, holds Joykutty and threatens him to marry Sindhu. Thoma and Urupadi tries to stop it but it fails. As Paulo sees Joykutty marrying Sindhu, he gets heartbroken and faints. He scolds Thoma and Urupadi for everything. Joykutty arrives there with Sindhu and Mathai to apologise but Paulo kicks him out of the house for marrying her against his wish. Joykutty then starts living in Mathai's house. Paulo then has only Thoma has his only son and he has many wishes for him. They goes to a ENT doctor and the doctor tells him that this cleft lip can be recovered but he won't get his voice back. He tries to convince Sreelakshmi about his love but she refuses. Thoma helps Bhagavathar to give back their house by giving him a money without his father's knowledge. Soon Sreelakshmi gets engaged to Rakesh. When Thoma learns this, he gets drunk and creates a scene. Mathai and Joykutty sees this and stops him. When Mathai tells her that Thoma helped her to give her home back without their father's knowledge, she realises her love towards Thoma. Bhagavathar then lodges a complaint to Rakesh about Thoma. Rakesh beats Thoma but Sreelakshmi stops it by telling him that Thoma is her fiancé which made him very happy.

One day, Paulo captures Vishambharan and hits him for his loss. Vishambharan reveals that Joykutty and Sindhu were in love and Thoma was the mastermind behind their marriage. He bribed Mahadevan and made him to stand with Thoma and Joykutty. When he proved that nobody is ready to marry Sindhu, Thoma made Mahadevan to convey Joykutty's feelings to Paulo. When Paulo realises that Thoma was cheating him, he hits Thoma and kicks him out of the house. He tells that his is going to live without anyone's help and he will show it to Thoma. Thoma reveals the whole incident to Sreelakshmi. He also tells that Joykutty begged Thoma to marry Sindhu to him as she is pregnant to Joykutty's baby. Sreelakshmi tells Thoma that Paulo will call him back. Meanwhile, Paulo finds out that his money 30 crores was stolen and he believes that Thoma stole it. He angrily goes to Mathai's house and asks where Thoma is but he wasn't there. He tells that Thoma stole his money and everyone hears it. Paulo asks his sons frankly to tell Thoma his money back. The villagers destroys Paulo's Chitti company. Paulo joins hands with Rakesh to find Thoma. One day, Kuttanpillai, a tea vendor sees Thoma. When he reveals the whole incident to Thoma, Rakesh arrives there with Paulo. When he was going to arrest Thoma he lies that Paulo's 30 crores were hawala money so he will arrest Paulo first. Rakesh reveals that he was betraying Paulo as he ashamed his father and made him to be arrested. He then handcuffs Thoma and Paulo and made them to walk all over the place to show the villagers in the same way how Paulo made Raghavan to walk. Paulo tells to the locals that Rakesh cheated him. Angrily he slaps Paulo. Thoma hits Rakesh for slapping Paulo and Rakesh beats Thoma and makes him unconscious. Rakesh then removes his belt and hits Paulo with. As Thoma sees his father getting beaten up, he fights back with Rakesh and saves his father. The fight stopped by Thoma's uncle Manikunju who reveals that he built some places like orphanages, schools with Paulo's money and Thoma helped him for it. He gave the money for a benefit for the villagers. Mathai threatens to kill Rakesh if he hits Thoma and Paulo. The villagers tells Rakesh to go away from the place otherwise they will kill him. Thoma apologises to Paulo, where Paulo realises his mistake and apologize to everyone who he had done bad things.

In a speech said by Paulo he reveals that Thoma changed him and his voice is the correct sound, after this, Bhagavathar fixes Sreelakshmi's marriage with Thoma.

== Cast ==
- Dileep as Plapparambil Thoma (Sound Thoma), Paulo's youngest son
- Mukesh as Plapparambil Mathai (Mustafa), Paulo's eldest son
- Sai Kumar as Plapparambil Paulo, Thoma's, Mathai's and Joykutty's father
- Shiju as Plapparambil Joykutty, Paulo's second son
- Nedumudi Venu as Manikunju, Thoma's, Mathai's and Joykutty's uncle
- Namitha Pramod as Sreelakshmi, Thoma's lover
- Suraj Venjaramoodu as Uruppadi
- Subbaraju as SI Rakesh Panicker (Voice over by Shobi Thilakan)
- Vijayaraghavan as Shankaran Bhagavathar, Sreelakshmi's father
- Kalabhavan Shajon as Sabu
- Dharmajan Bolgatty as Kittunni
- Reshmi Boban as Amina, Mathai's wife
- Majeed as Khader, Mathai's father-in-law and Amina's father
- Ambika Mohan as Lathika, Rakesh's aunt
- Soja Jolly as Sindhu, Joykutty's lover turned wife
- Nandu Pothuval as Stephen
- Kochu Preman as Kuttan Pillai (Kundan Pillai), Tea Shop Owner and Ward Member
- Santhosh as Raghavan Panicker, Rakesh's father (cameo)
- Joju George as Chacko
- Kollam Thulasi as Mahadevan
- Balachandran Chullikad as Dr. George Joseph
- Subbalakshmi (cameo)
- Kalabhavan Haneef as Andrew
- VK Sreeraman as Doctor (cameo)
- Baby Akshai as Mathai's son
- Durga Premjith as Mathai's daughter

== Soundtrack ==
Sound Thoma

Soundtrack album by Gopi Sundar
- Released: 24 March 2013
- Recorded: 2012–2013
- Genre: Feature film soundtrack
- Length: 27:58
- Language: Malayalam
- Label: Eastcoast Audios
- Producer: Gopi Sundar

Gopi Sundar chronology
Kammath & Kammath (2013)	Sound Thoma (2013)	ABCD (2013)

The soundtrack was composed by Gopi Sundar, with lyrics by Murukan Kattakada, Nadirsha, Rajeev Alunkal.

Track list
No.	Title	Lyrics	Singer(s)	Length
1.	"Kandal Njanoru" (Thoma style)	Nadirsha	Dileep	03:47
2.	"Kanni Penne"	Rajeev Alunkal	Shankar Mahadevan, Rimi Tomy	04:30
3.	"Oru Kaaryam"	Rajeev Alunkal	Udit Narayan, Shreya Ghoshal	06:02
4.	"Ambili Maame" (title song)	Murukan Kattakada	Reshmi Satheesh, Chorus	02:35
Total length:				27:58

== Reception ==
=== Box office ===
The film was commercial success, and ran over 100 days in theatres. The film collected ₹ 4.77 lakhs from UK box office in two weekends and ₹ 2.48 lakhs from US box office in its first weekend.
