= Maheshum Marutiyum =

- Directed by: Sethu
- Written by: Sethu
- Produced by: Maniyanpilla Raju
- Starring: Asif Ali; Mamta Mohandas
- Cinematography: Faiz Siddik
- Edited by: Jith Joshie
- Music by: Kedar
- Production companies: Maniyanpilla Raju Productions; VSL Film House
- Distributed by: Goodwill Entertainments
- Release date: 10 March 2023
- Country: India
- Language: Malayalam

Maheshum Marutiyum is a 2023 Indian Malayalam-language romantic comedy film written and directed by Sethu, featuring Asif Ali and Mamta Mohandas.

== Plot ==
In 1983, Mahesh's father buys a bright red Maruti 800, the new 'Indian' car of the people, which is presented to him by Indira Gandhi. Later Mahesh's father becomes a local celebrity car guy in his village, and was also featured in the newspaper.

Mahesh is a schoolboy and his sweetheart Gauri is the love of his life, but her family can afford to send her to Delhi for her education, so Mahesh concentrates on his new love towards the Maruti 800. Later Mahesh's father dies in train accident happened on 1988.

Twenty years or more years late, Mahesh is still caring his late father's Maruti. When the much loved car is stolen, Mahesh is devastated, but the thief has a kind heart and abandons the car after seeing the newspaper clipping of the car being presented by Indira Gandhi.

Some years later, Mahesh is running an automobile service garage and has some financial difficulty and due to his financial crisis he rents out his car, but it gets into trouble with the law when he rents the infamous Maruti car for a wedding.

Suddenly, his love from the past returns Gauri, she helps Mahesh with his court case and the childhood sweethearts rekindle their romance.

Gauri and Mahesh seem destined for a happy reunion and marriage, but the Maruti 800 is more important than she expected and Mahesh hasn't made a big success of himself, making him unacceptable for her wealthier family.

The Maruti 800 is now a vintage car with historical importance, its value is high and selling it could be the kickstart that Mahesh or rather Gauri needs for their future happiness together, if only Mahesh could bear to part with his father's car.

In the end, Mahesh started Maruti Authorised showroom in his village, and he placed his father's car Maruti 800.

== Cast ==
- Asif Ali as Mahesh
- Mamta Mohandas as Gauri
- Maniyanpilla Raju as Padmanabhan 'Pappettan', Mahesh's father
- Divya M. Nair as Narayani, Mahesh's mother
- Vijay Babu
- Edavela Babu as Jacob
- Kunchan as Adv. Rajan Pillai
- Prem Kumar as Sakhavu Sathyan
- Varun Dhara as Gopu, Mahesh's friend
- Shiva Hariharan as Gafoor, Mahesh's friend
- Krishna Prasad as Chandrappan
- Shaju Sreedhar as Wilson
- Manu as Thankachan
- Nancy G. as Sharadha
- Anumol R. S. as Maya
- Ranjini George as Junior Advocate
- Jayakrishnan as Panicker, Gauri's father
- Sindhu Varma as Gauri's mother
- Shyamaprasad as Big Talk TV show host

== Reception ==
Rating the film 3 on a scale of 5, Gopika Is from The Times of India said "Asif's movie has a good storyline and a careless climax".The New Indian Express critic wrote that "Leaving the audience to ponder over the characters and their future is a striking aspect of any good film. But not in such a strange manner." and gave 1.5 out of 5 rating.
