= Seniors (film) =

- Theatrical release poster
- Directed by: Vysakh
- Written by: Sachi-Sethu
- Produced by: Vaishakh Rajan
- Starring: Jayaram; Kunchacko Boban; Biju Menon; Manoj K. Jayan
- Cinematography: Shaji Kumar
- Edited by: Mahesh Narayanan
- Music by: Jassie Gift; Alex Paul; Alphons Joseph; Gopi Sundar(Background Score)
- Production company: Vaishaka Cynymas
- Distributed by: Vaishaka Release
- Release date: 7 May 2011 (India)
- Running time: 150 minutes
- Country: India
- Language: Malayalam
- Budget: ₹3crore
- Box office: ₹16 crore

Seniors is a 2011 Indian Malayalam-language comedy thriller film directed by Vysakh and written by Sachi-Sethu. The plot follows four friends who return to their alma mater as students. It stars Jayaram, Kunchacko Boban, Biju Menon, and Manoj K. Jayan. The film features songs by Alphons Joseph, and Alex Paul and a score by Gopi Sundar. The film was released in India and the United Kingdom on 7 May 2011. It was a blockbuster at the box office.

== Plot ==
The film starts with two flashback scenes. In 1981, a man is waiting for his flirtatious wife to come home and take care of their son and baby daughter. The wife comes with her boyfriend and after a fight, decides to leave the husband and children. The husband commits suicide by mixing poison in his drink. In another flashback, it's a college day festival in 1996. After a dance performance, Indu comes to enquire about her sister, Lakshmi, who is with her four friends and one of them says he would drop her home. The friends are having a good time enjoying the college day festival. In a sudden turn of events, there is a loud scream and all the students rush out to see what happened, only to find Lakshmi is killed.

In the present day, out of the four friends, Rex Immanuel, Philip Idikkula and Rashid Munna, three of them are excited to know about the return of Pappu, alias Padmanabhan, who was accused and spent time in jail for the murder of Lakshmi. Due to Pappu's stubbornness, the friends decide to get back to their studies, after a gap of 12 years. Now back from jail, Pappu wants to start everything from where they have missed it and the other three support him, taking a break from their jobs and joining the college for an M.A in Philosophy. Following certain hilarious sequences of the foursome in college, there are some interesting twists and turns to the plot, but the main aim of Pappu is to find the mystery behind the tragedy that happened 12 years ago and the killer who is among his friends.

At the end of the college festival program, he identifies that Lakshmi's killer is none other than Rex. Rex reveals that he was in love with Lakshmi and on her birthday when he came to visit her, he saw Lakshmi in bed with another person which made him angry to know that two women in his life—his mother and Lakshmi—are cheaters, making him kill Lakshmi. The wife who betrayed her husband with her boyfriend was Rex's mother. After saying this, he targets Jenny but Pappu stops him. He becomes the convict to save Rex. The film ends with Pappu back to college and everything is back to normal.

== Cast ==
- Jayaram as Padmanabhan (Pappu)
- Kunchacko Boban as Rex Emmanuel
- Biju Menon as Philip Idikkula
- Manoj K. Jayan as Rashid Munna
- Suraj Venjaramoodu as Thavala Thampi
- Siddique as Unnithan, college professor
- Jagathy Sreekumar as Adiyodi, college professor
- Vijayaraghavan as Alavudheen Ravuthar, college principal
- Ananya as Jenny, a college student (voice-over by Sreeja Ravi)
- Padmapriya as Indu, a college lecturer and Pappu's love interest (voice-over by Devi S.)
- Meera Nandan as Lakshmi, Indu's sister and Rex's ex-love interest
- Jyothirmayi as Elsamma, Idikkula's wife
- Radha Varma as Fathima, Munna's wife
- Lalu Alex as Stephen, Idikkula's father-in-law
- Sreejith Ravi as Santhosh, Police Officer
- Shammi Thilakan as CI Thomas George
- Ragasya as Vaduthala Valsala, a call-girl
- Sumit Naval as Immanuel, Rex's father
- Sajitha Betti as Rex's mother
- Thesni Khan as call girl with Alavudheen Ravuthar
- Lakshmi Priya as Damayanthi
- Anjali Nair as Rex's sister

== Soundtrack ==
Music was composed by Alphons Joseph, Jassie Gift, and Alex Paul with a score by Gopi Sundar. The lyrics were written by Santhosh Varma and Anil Panachooran. The songs were in the charts upon release.

No.	Title	Lyrics	Music	Artist(s)	Length
1.	"Aaramam Niranje"	Anil Panachooran	Alphons Joseph	Benny Dayal, Lakshmi
2.	"Ithiri Chakkara Nulli"	Santhosh Varma	Jassie Gift	Jassie Gift, Imran, Anuradha Sriram
3.	"Neram Thettippoyalum"	Santhosh Varma	Alex Paul	Ramesh Babu, Pradeep Babu, Vipin Xavier, Shyam Prasad, Nithin
4.	"Rhythm of Death" (Instrumental)		Alphons Joseph

== Reception ==
A critic from Rediff.com wrote that "Seniors may turn out to be a commercial success. But for the discerning viewer, it is just a cheap comedy".

Indiaglitz wrote "Seniors will definitely score big time for its skillful performances and the superb execution of the subject. This is an entertainer that has something for everyone. So be at the movies houses for a movie that has the potential to rock big time."

== Box office ==
The film was a commercial success, being screened for over 125 days and grossing a total of ₹16 crore.
