= Cousins (2014 film) =

- Film poster
- Directed by: Vysakh
- Written by: Sethu
- Produced by: Vysakh Rajan
- Starring: Kunchacko Boban; Indrajith Sukumaran; Suraj Venjaramoodu; Joju George; Vedhika; Nisha Agarwal; Pradeep Rawat
- Cinematography: Shaji Kumar
- Edited by: Mahesh Narayanan
- Music by: Gopi Sundar
- Production company: Vyshakha Cinemas
- Distributed by: Popcorn Entertainments
- Release date: 19 December 2014
- Country: India
- Language: Malayalam

Cousins is a 2014 Indian Malayalam language romantic comedy film directed by Vysakh and scripted by Sethu. The film stars Kunchacko Boban, Indrajith Sukumaran, Suraj Venjaramoodu and Joju George in the title roles. Vedhika and Nisha Agarwal play the female leads, while Pradeep Rawat, Kalabhavan Shajon, Kailash, Miya George, Shiju and Renji Panicker feature in supporting roles in the film. The story revolves around four cousins who undertake a journey with an intention, and followed by the issues they come across in between them. The film was released on 19 December 2014.

Cousins is produced by Vysakh Rajan under the banner of Vyshakha Cinemas, Music is by M. Jayachandran for the lines of Murugan Kattakada and Rafeeq Ahamed. Bangalore, Pollachi and Kodaikanal are the main outside Kerala locations of this comedy movie. This movie was an average grosser at the box office.

== Plot ==
Sam is psychologically trapped in the past following a tragic incident that occurred six years earlier, an event that nearly cost him his life. Unable to fully recover from the trauma, he struggles with fragmented memories. His psychiatrist advises him to revisit Manipal, a monarch in south india, where the incident took place, in the hope that returning to familiar surroundings will help him regain his lost memories.

Sam’s cousins — Georgy, Pauly, and Tony — accompany him on the road trip. While the journey begins as a light-hearted reunion filled with humor and nostalgia, it gradually uncovers painful truths from Sam’s past.

During their time in Manipal, the cousins meet Mallika, the sister of Sam’s former girlfriend Aarathi, who was nearly his wife. Through Mallika and Georgy — who already knows the full story — Pauly and Tony learn about Sam and Aarathi’s relationship. Georgy reveals that when Sam and Aarathi attempted to elope, they were intercepted by Aarathi’s brother’s men. Sam was captured, and in the chaos that followed, Aarathi was not saved.

Realizing that Aarathi may still be in danger, Georgy suspects that someone is attempting to kill her. The cousins bring Aarathi to their home to ensure her safety. With Mallika’s assistance, Georgy, Pauly, and Tony begin investigating the person responsible for targeting Aarathi.

As Sam slowly confronts his past, the cousins work together to uncover the truth behind the tragedy and the threats surrounding Aarathi.

== Cast ==
- Kunchacko Boban as Sam
- Indrajith Sukumaran as Georgy
- Suraj Venjaramoodu as Pauly
- Joju George as Tony
- Vedhika as Arathi, Sam's love interest turned wife
- Nisha Agarwal as Mallika/Malli, Georgy's love interest
- Pradeep Rawat as Nagarajan Adiga, (Voice over by Shobi Thilakan)
- Kalabhavan Shajon as Veerappa Gounder
  - Minon as young Veerappa
- P. Balachandran as Guruji
- Shiju as Chandrarajan
- Santhosh as Devarajan
- Vijayakumar as Rajarajan
- Abu Salim as Isaac, restaurant manager
- Sreedevi Unni as Arathi's and Mallika's grandmother
- Vinaya Prasad as Threasa, Sam's and Georgy's mother
- Sunil Sukhada as Stephen, Pauly's and Tony's father
- Ponnamma Babu as Nancy, Pauly's and Tony's mother
- Kamalinee Mukherjee in a cameo appearance in the item song Kannodu Kannidayum
- Miya as Ann, Sam's ex-girlfriend (cameo)
- Ranji Panicker as Doctor Kuruvila (cameo)
- Balachandran Chullikkadu as Varkey Master (cameo)
- Kailash as Peter (cameo)

== Production ==
Vedhika was signed to portray Kunchacko Boban's love interest and Bhavana as Indrajith Sukumaran's love interest. But she was later replaced with Nisha Agarwal as the team felt that somebody who is not a complete Malayali would be apt for the role. Filming locations include Bangalore, Kochi, Pollachi, Kodaikanal and Athirapilly.

The filming started on 10 August 2014 at Bangalore Palace, where a majority of filming took place over the next weeks. Around 600 artists, including a cultural troupe from Bangalore and nearly 80 horses were part of a song sequence, which was a five-day-long shoot and costed over ₹80 lakh (US$83,000). Kamalini Mukherjee did an item number for the movie.

== Soundtrack ==
The film's soundtrack contains 4 songs, all composed by M. Jayachandran. Lyrics by Murukan Kattakkada, Rafeeq Ahamed.

Cousins

Soundtrack album by M. Jayachandran
- Released: 12 April 2014
- Genre: Film soundtrack
- Length: 20:18
- Language: Malayalam
- Label: East Coast Audio Entertainments

No.	Title	Lyrics	Singer(s)	Length
1.	"Kaitha Poothathum"	Rafeeq Ahammed	Haricharan, Krish, Naresh Iyer	3:47
2.	"Kannodu Kannidayum"	Murukan Kattakada	Sithara Krishnakumar, Nikhil Raj	4:24
3.	"Kolussu Thenni Thenni"	Murugan Kattakada	Shreya Ghoshal, Tippu, Yazin Nizar	4:30
4.	"Neeyen Vennila"	Rafeeq Ahemmed	Haricharan, Chinmayi	4:36
Total length:				20:18

== Critical reception ==
The film received mixed reviews from both critics and the audience. Asha Prakash of The Times of India rated the film 2 out of 5 and praised the background score and music as "impressive". She also praised the art direction and cinematography for creating a visually spectacle with "rich, colourful, magnificant," and "grand scale" song sequences. The performance by Intrajith was also praised. However, she criticised the plot as "illogical" and "dramatic, beyond tolerance" and the attempts at comedy are seen as weak.
