= Makeup Man =

- Makeup Man theatrical poster
- Directed by: Shafi
- Written by: Sachi-Sethu
- Produced by: M.Ranjith
- Starring: Jayaram; Sheela; Siddique; Suraj Venjarammoodu; Janardhanan
- Cinematography: Alagappan.N
- Edited by: V. Saajan
- Music by: Vidyasagar
- Production company: Rejaputhra Films
- Distributed by: Rejaputhra Films
- Release date: 11 February 2011
- Running time: 150 minutes
- Country: India
- Language: Malayalam
- Budget: ₹4.5 crore (equivalent to ₹9.3 crore or US$970,000 in 2023)

Makeup Man is a 2011 Malayalam comedy film directed by Shafi and written by the Sachi-Sethu duo. The film stars Jayaram, Sheela, Siddique and Suraj Venjarammoodu in the lead roles, with Prithviraj and Kunchacko Boban appearing in guest roles. Vidyasagar composed the music, with lyrics penned by Kaithapram. The tumultuous life of a couple, after the wife becomes a heroine just by chance and the husband is forced to disguise himself as her makeup man, is being told here. The core plot of the movie was loosely based on the 2001 French movie My Wife Is an Actress.

== Plot ==
Balachandran is arrested by police by mistaking him to be a house breaker, while entering his own home in middle of a night. He explains his pathetic financial situation to the police inspector, including his huge debts and love affair with Soorya. After seeing him reluctant to take up her calls, the police inspector advises him to approach life positively by accepting her into his life. But Balu explains him that it is her marriage on the next morning and he is unable to bear the pain by talking to her. Upon the request of the inspector, Balu takes up her call, and learns that she is now waiting for him at the railway station. Balu arrives at the railway station and meets her. With the help of his friend Kitchu Manjaly, a production controller in film industry, Balu marries Soorya at a temple on the same morning. Kitchu arranges a room for them to spend a night in the same hotel where a film crew was residing. Paul, the film producer mistakes Soorya to be the new actress who has come to audition for the heroine role in the film and Kitchu to play things safe makes him believe so. Paul calls up Sidharth, the film director and cameraman to conduct a screen test on the same night. Though reluctant, Soorya and Balu has no option left. Soorya appears for the screen test and is successfully selected as the new heroine. Balu plays it safe by claiming to be her personal make-up man and appears on the set the next day. Soorya is given a screen name Anamika by the film director Sidharth. During the shoot, Siddharth develops a soft feeling towards her, and finds Balu's interference a nuisance. He tries all ways to belittle him and asks Anamika to dismiss him. Slowly, Soorya starts to enjoy the process of acting and is encouraged by the praise she receives for her performance in the movie. The first movie co-starring her with Kunchacko Boban becomes a superhit and Sidharth casts Soorya in his next movie with Prithviraj, which Balu objects. To make things worse, Soorya's father arrives on the set along with her fiancée to patch up things. Soorya's father is unaware about her relationship with Balu and thinks that she eloped on marriage eve to fulfill her apparent ambition of acting in movies. Balu, in a bid to reclaim his access to Soorya, tries to prove that she is his wife, but due to a peculiar turn of events, Anamika and Kitchu are in a position where they have to discredit Balu's claims. This causes Balu to believe Soorya dumped him when she got newfound fame and he quits from the set. Upon the release of the film, Soorya tries to patch up Balu, but he publicly humiliates her. Meanwhile, due to a misunderstanding, Soorya's father and fiancé as well as Sidharth come to mistakenly believe that Soorya loves Sidharth. Upon realizing his mistake, in a bid to sort out issues, Balu lands up in Hyderabad where Anamika is acting in her second movie as the heroine of Prithviraj Sukumaran. There, Balu is the make up man of Chandra, the second heroine. Sidharth, who now actively believes and behaves as if Soorya loves him, is again disturbed by seeing Balu and tries all ways to kick him out, but all in vain. Prithviraj and Chandra learns of Balu's issues with Anamika/Soorya from Kitchu, and they decide to help him by making opportunities for him to talk to Soorya. But when Balu tries to talk to Soorya, a hurt Soorya doesn't entertain him. After the pack up, on reaching back in Kochi, Balu is arrested by police for financial forgery. Prithviraj tells Siddharth about the relationship between Soorya and Balu. Initially shocked, Sidharth dubiously decides that Balu is a misfit for a talented person like Soorya and decides to play a dirty game to own her. He files a case on her behalf against Balu for which Balu files back another one. The legal fight and how Balu patches up with Soorya forms the rest of the story.

== Cast ==
- Jayaram as Balachandran (Balu)
- Sheela as Soorya / Anamika
- Siddique as Sidharth, Film director
- Suraj Venjaramoodu as Krishnanand aka Kichu, Production controller
- Jagathi Sreekumar as Vareeth Mappila
- Janardhanan as Paul, Film producer
- Jagadish as Advocate Mathai
- Krishna Kumar as Adv. Krishna Prasad
- T. P. Madhavan as Judge
- M. Ranjith as Ranjith, Camera man
- Salim Kumar as Lawrence
- Babu Namboothiri as Sathyanath, Soorya's father
- Baiju Santhosh as Joseph, Surya's first makeup man
- Saiju Kurup as Gireesh, Soorya's fiancée
- Kalpana
- Shammi Thilakan as SI Chandy
- Appa Haja as CI James
- Devan as Jacob Kuruvila
- Nimisha

=== Cameo appearances ===
- Prithviraj Sukumaran as Himself (Extented cameo)
- Kunchacko Boban as himself
- Kamna Jethmalani as Chandra

== Soundtrack ==
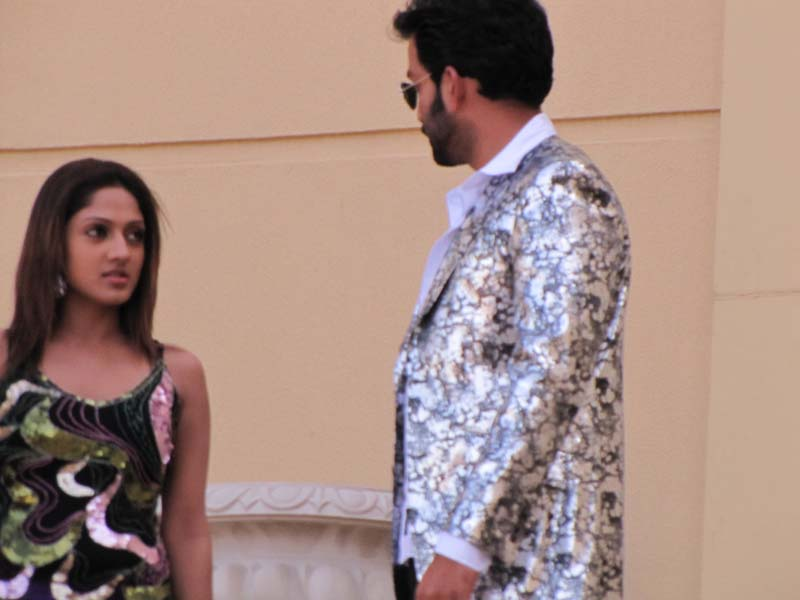
Sheela and Prithviraj Sukumaran during the shoot of the movie song Moolipaattum Paadi

Makeup Man

Soundtrack album by Vidyasagar
- Released: 10 February 2011
- Recorded: Varsha Vallaki Studios
- Genre: Feature film soundtrack
- Length: 12:17
- Label: Satyam Audios
- Producer: Vidyasagar

Vidyasagar chronology
Kaavalan (2011)	Makeup Man (2011)	Thambi Vettothi Sundaram (2011)

This album was composed by Vidyasagar in 2011. All lyrics were written by Kaithapram Damodaran Namboothiri.

Song	Singer	Length	Picturization
"Moolipaattum Paadi"	Karthik (singer), Kalyani Nair	4:24	with Jayaram, Sheela, Prithviraj, Kamna
"Aarutharum"	Madhu Balakrishnan	4:14	with Kunchacko Boban, Sheela
"Karimukil"	Afsal	4:19	

== Box office ==
The film made at a budget of ₹4.5 crore got a distributor's share of ₹3.04 crore and a satellite right for ₹2.25 crore. The film was a "hit status " at the box office.
