= Mayavi (2007 film) =

2007 Malayalam-language film directed by Shafi

- Directed by: Shafi
- Written by: Rafi Mecartin
- Produced by: P. Rajan
- Starring: Mammootty; Gopika
- Cinematography: Sanjeev Sankar
- Edited by: K. P. Hariharaputhran
- Music by: Alex Paul
- Production company: Vaishaka Movies
- Distributed by: Vaishaka Release
- Release date: 3 February 2007
- Running time: 132 minutes
- Country: India
- Language: Malayalam
- Box office: ₹16 crore

Mayavi (English: Mystifier) is a 2007 Indian Malayalam-language action comedy film directed by Shafi and written by the Rafi Mecartin duo, starring Mammootty in the title role with Gopika, Sai Kumar, Manoj K. Jayan, Salim Kumar, Suraj Venjaramoodu, Vijayaraghavan and Santhosh Jogi in supporting roles. It was a commercial success and was remade in Tamil as Vallakottai in 2010. The film was also the highest grossing Malayalam movie of the year.

== Plot ==
Mahi is a small time criminal who is imprisoned alongside other inmates in a jail. He is close friends with Balan, another inmate, and is much loved by both his fellow inmates as well as the jail staff. Mahi has earned the nickname Mayavi aka Mystifier for his ability to fight and take down his enemies swiftly, without even revealing his presence, which he demonstrates by bashing up Yatheendran, a newly transferred criminal who beats up Balan. Every Independence Day, one inmate is selected to be released due to special remission. Mahi and Balan hope that Balan gets released, so that he can find a way to earn money required for the operation of his critically ill younger brother Satheesh. But when Mahi is selected instead, he decides to find the money required for Satheesh, promising the same to Balan.

After meeting with Balan's mother and Satheesh, Mahi meets up with his old friend Giri, a mechanic. From Giri, Mahi learns that a rich family called Thottappally are looking for someone to take the blame for a crime, in exchange for ₹8 lakh rupees. While going to meet them, Mahi and Giri cross paths with Indu, a girl who lives at the respected Aaranimuttom House. The daughter of a former caretaker of the family, Indu has been raised by Aaranimutton Devaki, the family matriarch, like her own child. While on a boat, Indu gets into an argument with Thottappally Sugunan, the younger Thottappally Brother, who tips over the boat. Mahi saves Indu from drowning but leaves without introducing himself, leaving behind a watch gifted by his jailor with the name Mayavi written on it. Indu becomes fascinated by this mysterious Mayavi, but all attempts to find him fail.

Mahi and Giri meanwhile meet up with the Thottappally Brothers, Surendran and Sugunan, who reveal they are looking for a scapegoat to take blame for a murder they are going to commit. Surendran, Sugunan and their accomplices, including a corrupt police officer and their lawyer brother in law Hari, are planning to murder Aaranimuttom Sivasankaran Pillai, who is currently serving a life sentence for murdering Surendran and Sugunan's father and another man, after avoiding a death sentence. Surendran wants to take revenge when Sivasankaran comes out on parole, but doesn't want to face justice, so he wants Mahi to take the blame for the murder in exchange for the promised sum, which Mahi agrees. In order to make the case seem legitimate, the Thottappally brothers and Hari get an intoxicated Mahi and an unsuspecting Indu caught in a fake trafficking case with the help of Kannan Srank, a goon. After proving his innocence, Mahi befriends Indu and her little sister Ammu, who he had seen earlier and learned that she is Satheesh's girlfriend.

Mahi learns more about the enmity between the Thottappally and Aranimuttom families. It is revealed that Surendran and Sugunan's father was once a friend of Sivasankaran, who then became his business rival and later enemy. In the escalting feud, he orchestrated a car crash to kill the Aranimuttom family, which resulted in Sivasankaran, a benevolent and beloved man, losing his family, and in revenge, he killed Surendran and Sugunan's father, and the driver who was hired to cause the accident, before surrendering to the police. Realizing he has alligned himself with the wrong people, Mahi once again taps into his old habits, and delivers sweet justice to break the Thottappally brothers. He beats up Sugunan for getting Ammu arrested on a false charge, and then beats up Surendran after he burned down Ammu and Indu's house, without revealing his true identity, leaving them with one name, Mayavi.

Using Kannan Srank, who reveals that he was Sivasankaran's right hand man, who became a goon for the Thottappally brothers in fear of his life, Mahi as Mayavi helps to prove both Indu and Ammu innocent in their allegations, while appearing naive and loyal to the Thottappally brothers. People also begin to believe that Srank is Mayavi's mentor, which gives him enough popularity and confidence to stand up to the Thottappally brothers. Through Kannan Srank, Mahi is also able to get the money required for Satheesh's operation to Ammu without revealing himself. Due to the string of events happening around them, Mayavi becomes a hot topic among the people. Indu becomes infatuated with this mysterious man helping them, while her friendship with Mahi grows. Meanwhile, the Thottappally brothers and their allies relentlessly search for Mayavi in order to take revenge.

Sivasankaran, who gets released on parole, meets Mahi and Giri after getting wind of their intentions, and calmly asks them to leave. Meanwhile Balan also gets released from jail as Satheesh's operation happens, and meets Sivasankaran, who came to visit Satheesh alongside Ammu and Indu. Due to a series of misunderstandings, Sivasankaran believes that Balan is Mayavi, and proposes that Satheesh and Ammu be wedded. Balan doesn't correct him, seeking to earn more money in the process. Meanwhile the Thottappally brothers get Yatheendran released from jail, and he reveals to them that Mahi himself is Mayavi. Mahi escapes after beating them up. He then subsequently foils another attempt on Sivasankaran by his enemies, earning their ire.

After learning that Balan and Mahi are friends, the Thottappally brothers decide to kill Balan as revenge. But Yatheendran, who had befriended Balan in the meantime, instead spares him. Yatheendran asks Balan, whom Sivasankaran believes to be Mayavi and wants to get Indu married to, to allign with the Thottappally brothers to kill Sivasankaran, so that he can become the owner of all the family assets. A greedy Balan agrees and joins forces with the Thottappally brothers, ignoring warnings from Mahi and severing their friendship. Balan leads Sivasankaran into an ambush laid by the Thottappally brothers, the police officer, Yatheendran and Hari to kill him. But Mahi, who had secretly overheard everything, arrives in time to save Sivasankaran, and reveals that he is in actuality, Mayavi. He defeats everyone, but is unable to stop Surendran from injuring Sivasankaran. Mahi rescues the injured Sivasankaran, who exposes Balan's trachery, leaving him to be beaten up by the people. He then reveals to Indu that the Mayavi she has been searching for is Mahi, much to her happiness.

Sometime later, a fully recovered Sivasankaran, as well as the Aranimuttam family, Giri and Kannan Srank, attend the wedding of both Ammu and Satheesh, as well as Indu and Mahi.

== Cast ==
- Mammootty as Mahi aka Mayavi
- Manoj K. Jayan as Balan
- Sai Kumar as Aaranimuttom Sivasankaran Pillai
- Salim Kumar as Kannan Srank
- Suraj Venjaramoodu as Parumala Giri
- Vijayaraghavan as Thottappally Surendran
- Santhosh Jogi as Thottappally Sugunan
- Gopika as Aaranimuttom Indu (Voice-over by Sreeja Ravi)
- Spadikam George as Police Officer
- Mohan Raj as Yatheendran
- P. Sreekumar as Advocate Hari
- Cochin Haneefa as Jailor Suresh Kumar
- K. P. A. C. Lalitha as Aaranimuttom Devaki
- Tony Sijimon as Sivasankaran's son
- Mamukkoya as Koya
- Manikuttan as Satheesh
- Narayanankutty as Sasi
- Bindu Panicker as Thottappally Surendran's Wife
- T. P. Madhavan as Home Minister
- Nimisha Suresh as Ammu (Indu's Sister)
- Vishnu Unnikrishnan
- Kalabhavan Rahman as Kumaran
- Jis Joy as Hospital Cashier
- Nandu Poduval as Barber
- Sagar Shiyas as Prisoner

== Soundtrack ==
Mayavi

Soundtrack album by Alex Paul
- Recorded: 2007
- Genre: Feature film soundtrack
- Producer: Alex Paul

The songs are composed by Alex Paul. The soundtrack album, which was released in 2007, features four songs overall, with lyrics written by Vayalar Sharath Chandra Varma.

Track listing
No.	Title	Lyrics	Singer(s)	Length
1.	"Sneham Thenalla"	Vayalar Sharath Chandra Varma	M. G. Sreekumar, G. Venugopal
2.	"Muttathe Mulle (D) Raga: Kapi"	Vayalar Sharath Chandra Varma	K. J. Yesudas, Manjari
3.	"Muttathe Mulle (M) Raga: Kapi"	Vayalar Sharath Chandra Varma	K. J. Yesudas
4.	"Muttathe Mulle (F) Raga: Kapi"	Vayalar Sharath Chandra Varma	Manjari

== Reception ==
The film was a commercial success. The film collected ₹2.21 crore in its first week from 45 screens in Kerala. At Thiruvananthapuram Ajantha and Sri, it grossed nearly ₹11 lakhs in its first week. The film collected ₹11 crore within 50 days of its release and a distributor share of more than ₹6 crores in 50 days. It became the first Malayalam film of 2007 to run for 100 days in theatres, grossing ₹16 crore, and also became the highest grossing Malayalam film of the year 2007. In 100 days, the film had collected ₹61 lakhs from main centers like Thiruvananthapuram. It ran for over 150 days at Ernakulam Kanoos theater.
