= Chungakkarum Veshyakalum =

- Film poster
- Directed by: Isaac Thomas
- Written by: Isaac Thomas
- Produced by: V. B. K. Das; Isaac Thomas
- Starring: Thilakan; Michelle Sinclair
- Cinematography: Shon Smith; Dave Luxon
- Edited by: Isaac Thomas; Shon Smith
- Music by: Biju Paulose
- Production company: Maharishi Films
- Release date: 12 August 2011
- Countries: Canada; India
- Language: Malayalam

Chungakkarum Veshyakalum (English: The Tax Collectors and the Prostitutes) is a Canadian-Indian film in Malayalam language. It was written, directed, co-produced and co-edited by Isaac Thomas. The film stars Thilakan in the lead role, Sanjay George and Anu Thahim in supporting roles.

The film started production on 30 October 2007. It was released in Kerala in August 2011.

== Plot ==
A Malayali family hAS emigrated to Canada some years back. Later, Unnunnichayan goes to Canada to stay with his son. He is from a village in Kerala and finds it difficult to adjust with the Canadian lifestyle. He faced difficulties since he does not know English or the Canadian people. On occasions, even his son got angry with him for his mistakes or ignorant behaviour.

== Cast ==
- Thilakan as Unniyachan
- Sanjay George
- Jaison Mathews
- Saju Varghese
- Anu Thahim
- Sivan Kailas
- Michelle Sinclair
- R. Panicker
- Sreejith

== Production ==
The film was shot entirely in Canada and notably in and around Alberta.

== Reception ==
The film has been described as an "offbeat movie spoke about the struggle of an elderly person who while leading a life in Canada when he goes there to stay with his son."
