= Vysakh =

Indian filmmaker

- Vysakh in 2019
- Born: Ebbey Abraham; 1 June 1980 (age 46); Kanhangad, Kerala, India
- Occupation: Film director
- Years active: 2005–present
- Spouse: Neena (m. 2007)
- Children: 2
- Parents: K. C. Abraham; Marriyamma Abraham

Ebbey Abraham (born 1 June 1980), better known by his stage name Vysakh, is an Indian film director who works in Malayalam films and is known for several commercially successful films like Pokkiri Raja, Seniors, Mallu Singh, Pulimurugan and Madhura Raja. He began his career as a television anchor and later as an associate director to Joshiy and Johny Antony. He debuted as an independent director in 2010 with Pokkiri Raja starring Mammootty and Prithviraj Sukumaran. In 2016, his directorial Pulimurugan starring Mohanlal and Jagapathi Babu became the first Malayalam film to gross around ₹100 crore at the box office.

== Early life ==
Ebbey Abraham was born in 1980 at Kalliot, Kanhangad, Kasaragod district, as the son of K. C. Abraham and Mariyamma Abraham.

== Career ==
He took the name Vysakh for anchoring the television show Ponpulari aired on Surya TV. Later he began working as an associate director to Johny Antony in films such as CID Moosa, Kochi Rajavu, Thuruppugulan and Inspector Garud. He worked with Joshiy for Naran, Twenty:20 and Robin Hood.

He debuted as an independent director in 2010 through the action masala film Pokkiri Raja starring Mammootty and Prithviraj in the lead roles. It grossed ₹25 crore and became the top grosser of the year 2010 in Malayalam. His next venture was the comedy thriller Seniors starring Jayaram, Kunchacko Boban, Biju Menon, and Manoj K. Jayan in the lead roles. His third film was Mallu Singh Starring Kunchacko Boban and Unni Mukundan in the lead roles in 2012. All the three films were commercial success at the box office. In 2013 he also wrote the screenplay and directed the drama film Vishudhan Starring Kunchacko Boban. In 2014 he directed full on full comedy drama movie Cousins Starring Kunchacko Boban, Indrajith Sukumaran, Suraj Venjaramoodu and Joju George in the lead roles.

In 2016, Pulimurugan with Mohanlal in the lead role became the highest-grossing Malayalam film ever and the first film to gross ₹100 and ₹150 crore at the box office in Malayalam film history. His following film was Madhura Raja (2019) with Mammootty in the lead role is a sequel of Pokkiri Raja. Madhura Raja got mixed to positive reviews and grossed more than ₹100 crore worldwide.

He directed Night Drive starring Indrajith Sukumaran, Anna Ben and Roshan Mathew in lead roles. He also directed the Mohanlal starrer Monster (2022) which received mixed to negative reviews, heavily panned by the critics and the audience alike.

His last film was Turbo, written by Midhun Manuel Thomas starring Mammootty, Raj B. Shetty, Sunil, Kabir Duhan Singh and Anjana Jayaprakash in the lead roles.

== Personal life ==
He married Neena from Udayapuram, Kanhangad, Kerala, a nurse on 12 November 2007. They have two children.

== Filmography ==
=== Director ===
List of Vysakh credits as a director
Year	Title	Screenplay	Notes
2010	Pokkiri Raja	Udayakrishna-Siby K. Thomas	Directorial debut
2011	Seniors	Sachi-Sethu	
2012	Mallu Singh	Sethu	
2013	Sound Thoma	Benny P Nayarambalam	
2013	Vishudhan	Himself	Debut film as screenwriter
2014	Cousins	Sethu	
2016	Pulimurugan	Udayakrishna	
2019	Madhura Raja	Udayakrishna	
2022	Night Drive	Abhilash Pillai	
2022	Monster	Udayakrishna	
2024	Turbo	Midhun Manuel Thomas	
2026	Khalifa: The Ruler	Jinu V. Abraham	

=== Producer ===
- Ira (2018)

=== Assistant Director ===
- C.I.D. Moosa (2003)
- Naran (2005)
- Kochi Rajavu (2005)
- Thuruppugulan (2006)
- Inspector Garud (2007)
- Twenty:20 (2008)
- Bhagavan (2009)
- Robin Hood (2009)

=== Actor ===
==== Television ====
- Kadamattathu Kathanar (2004)
