= Shafi (director) =

Indian film director (1968–2025)

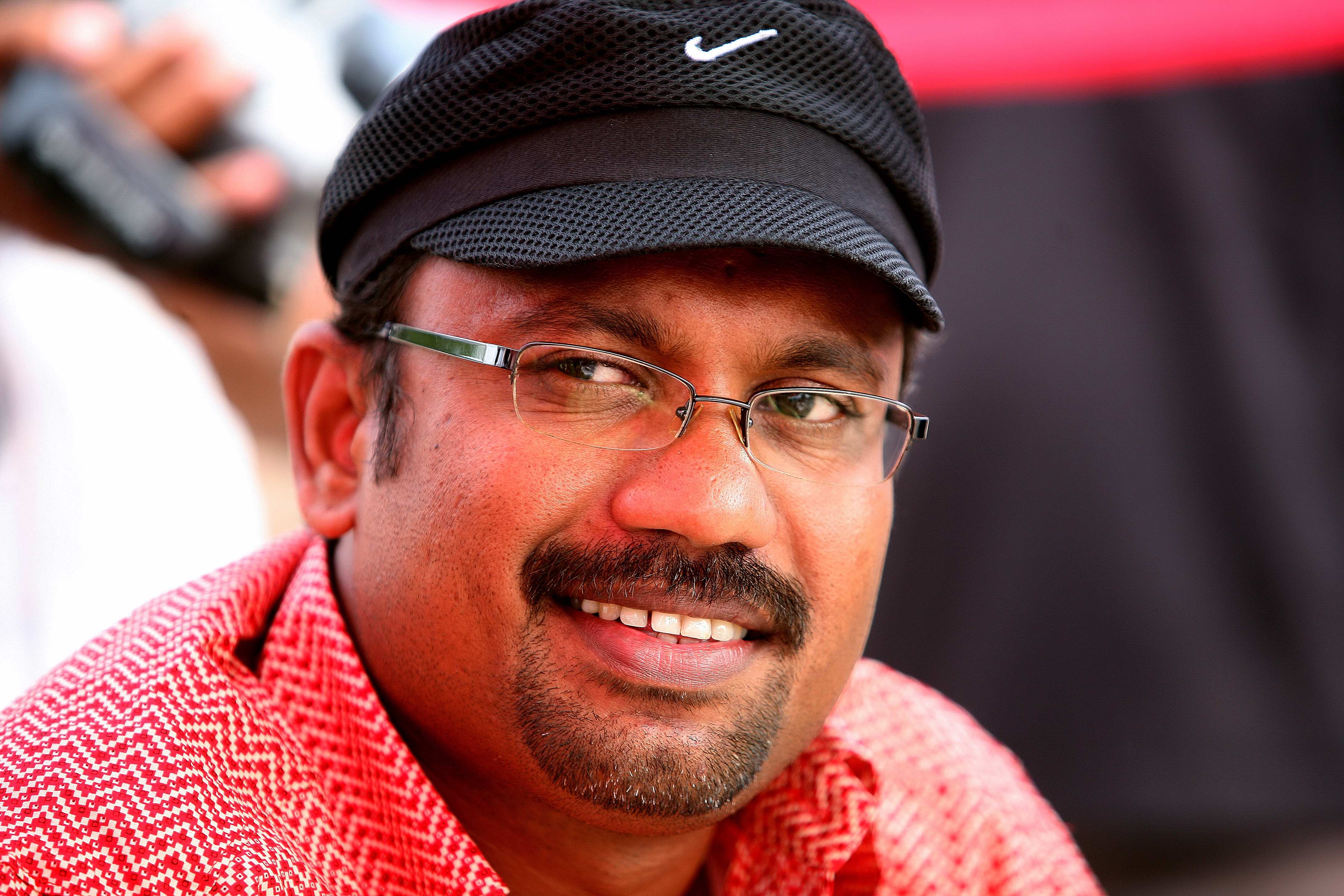
- Shafi in 2008
- Born: Rasheed M. H. 18 February 1968; Ernakulam, Kerala, India
- Died: 26 January 2025 (aged 56); Ernakulam, Kerala, India
- Occupations: Film director; screenwriter
- Years active: 1995–2025
- Relatives: Rafi (brother); Siddique (uncle)

Rasheed M. H. (18 February 1968 – 26 January 2025), known professionally as Shafi, was an Indian film director who worked in Malayalam cinema, best known for directing comedy films. He has also directed a Tamil film. Shafi made his directorial debut with One Man Show in 2001. Rafi of the Rafi Mecartin duo is his elder brother. Director Siddique is their uncle. Shafi started his film career in the mid-1990s by assisting director Rajasenan and the Rafi Mecartin duo.

== Career ==
Shafi started his career through the film One Man Show which was released in 2001. He has directed 18 films. His notable movies are Kalyanaraman (2002), Pulival Kalyanam (2003), Thommanum Makkalum (2005), Mayavi (2007), Chattambinadu (2009), Two Countries (2015). In 2018, Shafi directed Mega Stage Show Madhuram 18 performing in 15 stages in U.S.A and Canada. In 2019, Shafi directed the movie Children's Park.

== Death ==
Shafi died at Aster Medcity in Ernakulam, Kerala, on 26 January 2025, at the age of 56. He had suffered a massive stroke on 16 January and was admitted to the hospital. Though he underwent a neurosurgery, his condition remained critical and was on ventilator support. He was buried at Kaloor Juma Masjid in the presence of many persons on the same day as he died.

== Filmography ==
=== As assistant director ===
Year	Film	Screenwriter	Cast	Notes
1995	Aadyathe Kanmani	Rafi Mecartin	Jayaram, Biju Menon	
1995	Puthukkottayile Puthumanavalan	Rafi Mecartin	Jayaram	
1995	Hitler	Siddique	Mammootty, Mukesh	
1997	Superman	Rafi Mecartin	Jayaram	
1997	The Car	Rafi Mecartin	Jayaram	
1999	Friends	Siddique	Jayaram, Mukesh, Sreenivasan	
2000	Thenkasipattanam	Rafi Mecartin	Suresh Gopi, Lal	

=== As director ===
Year	Film	Screenwriter	Notes
2001	One Man Show	Rafi Mecartin	Debut film
2002	Kalyanaraman	Benny P Nayarambalam	
2003	Pulival Kalyanam	Udaykrishna & Siby K. Thomas	
2005	Thommanum Makkalum	Benny P Nayarambalam	
2005	Majaa	Viji; Benny P Nayarambalam (story)	Tamil film Remake of Thommanum Makkalum
2007	Mayavi	Rafi Mecartin	
2007	Chocolate	Sachi & Sethu	
2008	Lollipop	Benny P Nayarambalam	
2009	Chattambinadu	Benny P Nayarambalam	
2010	Marykkundoru Kunjaadu	Benny P Nayarambalam	
2011	Makeup Man	Sachi & Sethu	
2011	Venicile Vyaapari	James Albert	
2012	101 Weddings	Kalavoor Ravikumar	
2015	Two Countries	Rafi	
2017	Sherlock Toms	Screenplay: Shafi, Najim Koya, Sachy; Story: Najim Koya & Sachy	
2018	Oru Pazhaya Bomb Kadha	Binju Joseph & Sunil Karma	
2019	Children's Park	Rafi	
2022	Aanandam Paramanandam	M Sindhuraj	Last film
