= Vidhu Prathap discography =

Vidhu Prathap is an Indian playback singer. Renowned for his voice, he has lent his vocals to over 100 film songs, predominantly in Malayalam cinema, as well as in Tamil, Kannada, and Telugu films.

== As playback singer ==
=== 2000s ===
Year	Song Title	Film	Co-Singer(s)	Music Director/Composer	Notes	Ref.
2002	"Vaaleduthal"	Meesa Madhavan	Anuradha Sriram	Vidyasagar		
2003	"Gujarathi"	Pulival Kalyanam	Jyotsna Radhakrishnan	Berny–Ignatius		
2004	"Kakothi Kavile"	Chathikkatha Chanthu	M. G. Sreekumar	Alex Paul		
2004	"Nadiye Nile Nadiye"	Runway	Sujatha Mohan	Suresh Peters		
2004	"Nee Vaada"	Rasikan	Biju Narayanan	Vidyasagar		
2005	"Oridathorida"	Athbhutha Dweepu	Jyotsna	M. Jayachandran		
2005	"Bunny Bunny"	Bunny		Devi Sri Prasad	Malayalam version	
2005	"Mayilin"	Pandippada	Sujatha Mohan, Afsal	Suresh Peters		
2005	"Kaatru Veliyidai"	Thanmathra	Sheela Mani, Dr. Unnikrishnan, Sunil	Mohan Sithara		
2007	"Athishayan (Kuttappanmaaraya)"	Athisayan	Balu	Alphons Joseph		
2007	"Mazha Manimukile"	Kangaroo (2007 film)	Rimi Tomy	Alex Paul		
2008	"Jerusalemile"	Lollipop	Afsal	Alex Paul		
2008	"Kannum Chimmi"	Lollipop	Rimi Tomy	Alex Paul		
2009	"Manjin Thullikal"	Dheera	Akhila Anand	M. M. Keeravani	Malayalam version of Magadheera	
2009	"Panchasara Umma"	Dheera	Manjari	M. M. Keeravani	Malayalam version of Magadheera	
2009	"Mohajaalakam"	Arya 2		Devi Sri Prasad	Malayalam version	
2009	"Chattambinadu"	Chattambinaadu	Ramesh Babu, Reju Joseph	Alex Paul		
2009	"Mukkuttichaanthaniyunne"	Chattambinaadu	Manjari	Alex Paul		

=== 2010s ===
Year	Song Title	Film	Co-Singer(s)	Music Director/Composer	Notes	Ref.
2010	"Oh Rambho"	In Ghost House Inn	M. G. Sreekumar, Ramesh Babu, Vipin Xavier	Alex Paul		
2010	"Adavukal"	In Ghost House Inn	M. G. Sreekumar, Afsal, Anitha, Cochin Ibrahim, Rimi Tomy, Sangeetha Prabhu, Sajini Anand, Sangita Madhavan Nair, Sruthi Raj	Alex Paul		
2012	"Parijatha Pookkal"	Dracula 2012		Babith George Vimal		
2012	"Veeshum Velichathile"	Eecha	Sahithi	M. M. Keeravani	Malayalam Dubbed version of Eega	
2012	"Pattu Pattu"	Cobra:Kottayam Brothers	Rimi Tomy	Alex Paul		
2013	"Cheru Cheru"	Pullipulikalum Aattinkuttiyum	Afsal, Sricharan	Vidyasagar		
2015	"Ullasa Gayike"	Adi Kapyare Kootamani	Shaan Rahman, Remya Nambessan	Shaan Rahman		
2017	"Tappo Tappo Nenjil Thatti"	DJ: Duvvada Jagannadham		Devi Sri Prasad	Malayalam version	
2017	"Minna Minnipole"	DJ: Duvvada Jagannadham	Durga Viswanath	Devi Sri Prasad	Malayalam version	
2018	"Ini Raave"	Ranam		Jakes Bejoy		

=== 2020s ===
Year	Song Title	Film	Co-Singer(s)	Music Director/Composer	Notes	Ref.
2020	"Kattumundedye"	Dhamaka		Gopi Sundar		
2021	"Ethetho Maunangal"	Cheraathukal	Nithya Mammen	Shefin Mayan		
