= John Honai =

2015 film by T A Thufeeq

- Directed by: T.A. Thaufeeq
- Written by: Fazal
- Produced by: P.T. Saleem; Madhu Thilenkery
- Starring: Siddique; Mukesh; Malavika Menon; Ashokan; Jagadish; Rizabawa
- Cinematography: Raja Rathnam
- Edited by: Vipin Mannoor
- Music by: Alex Paul (songs); Ouseppachan (background score)
- Production company: El Shadai Creations
- Release date: 11 December 2015
- Running time: 121 minutes
- Country: India
- Language: Malayalam

John Honai is a 2015 Indian Malayalam-language comedy thriller film directed by T.A. Thufeeq, written by Fazal and produced by P.T. Saleem and Madhu Thilenkery. The film stars Siddique as John Honai in the lead role along with Malavika Menon, Jagadish and Mukesh in the major roles. The music is composed by Alex Paul and the background score was composed by Ouseppachan. The screenplay is based on a story written by Fazal. The film's name gives the impression that it is a sequel to the comedies "In Harihar Nagar", "2 Harihar Nagar" and "In Ghost House Inn", but it is completely disconnected.

== Plot ==
The film tells the story of three men named John, Jaffer and Janardhanan. John has an accident with a rich merchant named Devanarayanan. Devanarayanan hands him a blank cheque and on the very next day he gets killed. John, Jaffer and Janardhanan receive three crore rupees through the cheque and decide to spend it in Dubai as a holiday trip. At the same time, Sreenivasan, an investigating officer, also reaches Dubai with them from Kerala. Once they reach Dubai they are allotted a tourist guide by Janardhanan's friend. There, they also have to face John Honai, the real owner of the three crore rupees who has come from Kerala to retrieve it. The difficulties faced by John, Jaffer and Janardhanan to solve the problems that they face in Dubai forms the crux of the film.

== Cast ==
- Siddique as John Honai
- Mukesh as Sreenivasan
- Kalabhavan Navas as Jaffer
- Rizabawa as Devanarayanan/ George Varghese
- S P Sreekumar as Janardhanan
- Malavika Menon as Maria
- Mamukkoya as Gafoorikka
- Ashokan as Valooraan Johny
- Jagadish as Banker Vasudeva Kammath
- Jaise Jose as Luther

== Soundtrack ==
The music is composed by Alex Paul along with Afsal, Vidhu Prathap and Rimy Tomy. The background score was composed by Ouseppachan.

- "Manikyam Pole" – Pradeep Babu, Ramesh Babu
- "Onnu Parayille" – Rimy Tomy, Vidhu Prathap
- "Thathaka Thathka" – Afsal

== Critical response ==
The film received negative reviews from both critics and audiences alike and failed at the box office.

== See also ==
- Siddique-Lal
