= Rimi Tomy discography =

Rimi Tomy is an Indian playback singer, Carnatic Musician, television host, and an actress. She started her career by anchoring music programs in television and sang her first song "Chingamasam Vannu Chernnal" in the 2002 film Meesa Madhavan with co-singer Shanker Mahadevan.

== Film songs ==
=== 2000s ===
Year	Film	Title	Composer	Co-singer(s)	Notes	Ref.
2002	Meesa Madhavan	"Chingamaasam"	Vidyasagar	Shankar Mahadevan	Debut as Playback singer	
2005	Udayananu Tharam	"Karale Karalinte"	Deepak Dev	Vineeth Sreenivasan		
2007	Speed Track	"Ko Ko Ko Kozhi"	Deepak Dev	Vineeth Sreenivasan		
2007	Athisayan	"Ennomale"	Alphons Joseph	Vineeth Sreenivasan		
2007	Chotta Mumbai	"Vasco Da Gama"	Rahul Raj	Vipin Xavier, Afsal	Duet Version	
2007	Chocolate	"Kalkanda Malaye"	Alex Paul	Liji Francis, Akhila Anand		
2007	Chocolate	"Chocolate"	Alex Paul	M. G. Sreekumar		
2007	Kangaroo	"Mazha Manimukile"	Alex Paul	Vidhu Prathap		
2008	Lollipop	"Kannum Chimmi"	Alex Paul	Vidhu Prathap		
2009	Chattambinadu	"Chenkathali"	Alex Paul			

=== 2010s ===
Year	Film	Title	Composer	Co-singer(s)	Notes	Ref.
2010	In Ghost House Inn	"Theekaayum Thaanthonni"	Alex Paul	M. G. Sreekumar		
2010	In Ghost House Inn	"Adavukal"	Alex Paul	M. G. Sreekumar, Afsal, Anitha, Cochin Ibrahim, Sangeetha Prabhu, Vidhu Prathap, Sajini Anand, Sangita Madhavan Nair, Sruthi Raj		
2010	Oru Naal Varum	"Naathoone Naathoone"	M. G. Sreekumar	Mohanlal		
2010	Elsamma Enna Aankutty	"Kannadi Chirakulla"	C. Rajamani	Achu Rajamani		
2010	College Days	"Thumbippenne"	Ronnie Raphael	Jassie Gift, Afsal, Kripa		
2011	Christian Brothers	"Parmanandam"	Deepak Dev	Shankar Mahadevan		
2011	Christian Brothers	"Karthaave"	Deepak Dev	Shankar Mahadevan		
2011	Christian Brothers	"Mizhikalil Naanam"	Deepak Dev	Ranjith, Nikhil Mohan		
2011	Teja Bhai & Family	"Punjiricke Punjiricke"	Deepak Dev	Benny Dayal		
2011	Oru Marubhoomikkadha	"Manassu Mayakki"	M. G. Sreekumar	Sudeep Kumar		
2012	Mayamohini	"Ullil Kothividarum"	Berny–Ignatius			
2012	Mayamohini	"Avanipadam Poothallo"	Berny–Ignatius	Biju Narayanan, Franco Simon		
2012	My Boss	"Kuttanadan Punchaneele"	Sejo John	Rahul Nambiar		
2013	Sound Thoma	"Kanni Penne"	Gopi Sundar	Shankar Mahadevan		
2014	Avatharam	"Konji Konji"	Deepak Dev	Shankar Mahadevan		
2014	Villali Veeran	"Cindrella Chandhame"	S. A. Rajkumar	Karthik		
2014	RajadhiRaja	"Midumidukkan"	Berny–Ignatius	Madhu Balakrishnan, Kumari Nandha J. Devan		
2014	Angry Babies in Love	"Eden Thottam"	Bijibal	Nikhil Mathew	Also known as "Maaya Theeram"	
2014	Mylanchi Monchulla Veedu	"Puthanilanjikk"	Afzal Yusuf	Anwar Sadat, Yazin Nizar	Version 1	
2014	Aamayum Muyalum	"Kaanakombile"	M. G. Sreekumar		Female Version	
2016	Aadupuliyattam	"Chilum Chilum"	Ratheesh Vega	Najim Arshad		
2016	Kattappanayile Rithwik Roshan	"Parudeyam Mariyame"	Nadirshah	Vaikom Vijayalakshmi		
2018	Oru Kuttanadan Blog	"Mangalam"	Sreenath Sivasankaran	Zia Ul Haq, Haricharan		
2019	Oru Yamandan Premakadha	"Kothiyoorum Balyam"	Nadirshah	Vineeth Sreenivasan		
2019	Children’s Park	"Kannanthumbi Koottam"	Arun Raj	Vijay Yesudas, Mridula		

=== 2020s ===
Year	Film	Title	Composer	Co-singer(s)	Notes	Ref.
2021	Mohan Kumar Fans	"Mallike Mallike"	Prince George	Benny Dayal		

== Other language film songs ==
Year	Film	Title	Composer	Co-singer(s)	Language	Notes	Ref.
2006	Sri Krishna 2006	"Puttindi Mandapeta"	M. M. Srilekha		Telugu		
