= Manjari (Indian singer) =

Indian singer

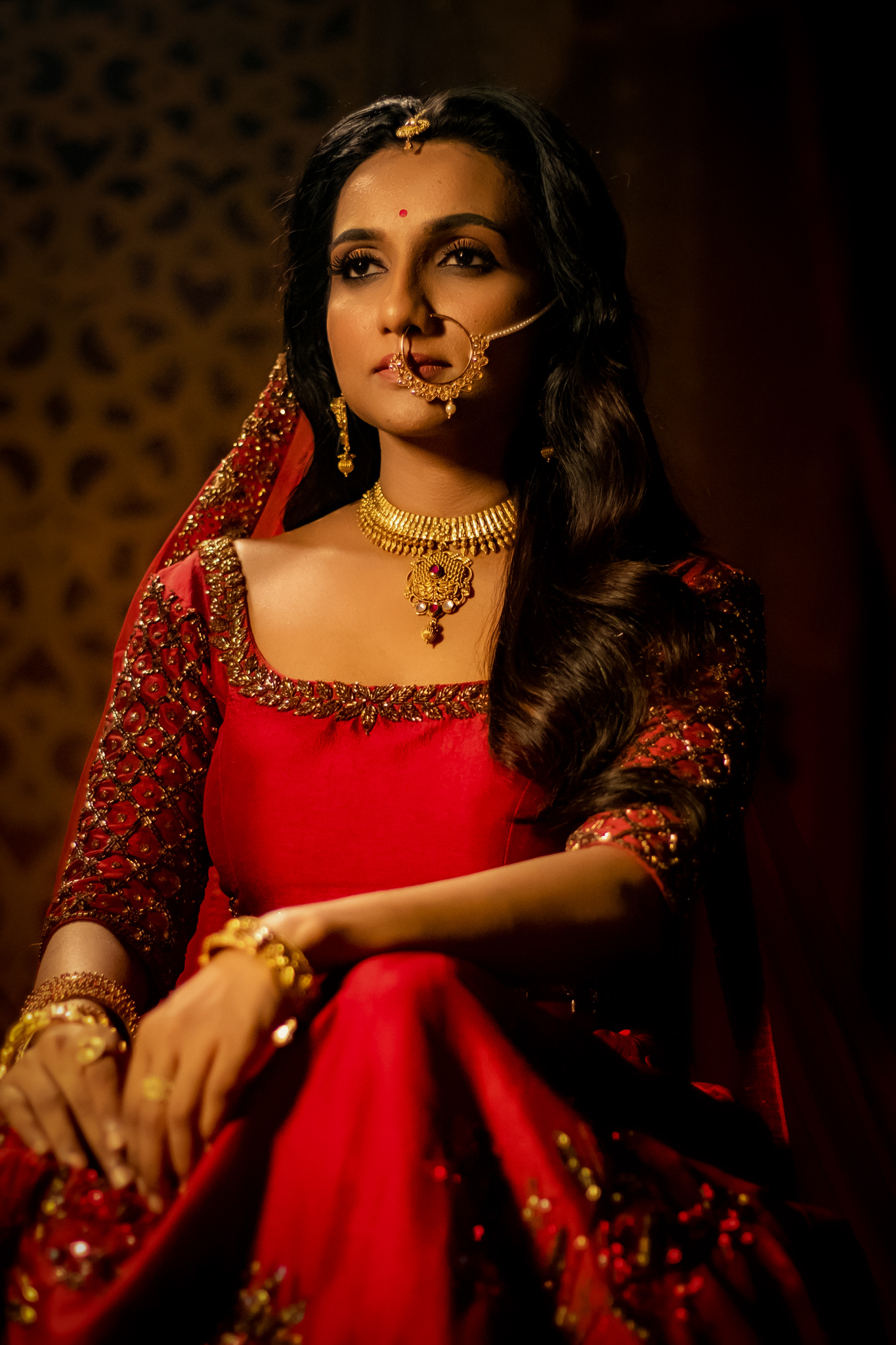
- Manjari
- Born: Kannur, Kerala, India
- Occupations: Singer; Music Director/Producer
- Years active: 2004–present
- Parent(s): Babu Rajendran; Dr. Latha
- Musical career
- Genres: Film; Pop; Ghazal; Classical; Bhajan
- Instrument: Vocals
- Label: Independent Artist
- Website: www.singermanjari.com

Manjari is an Indian playback singer and Hindustani vocalist. Her first stage performance was with Shiva, the Kolkata - based rock band, when she was in class eight.

== Career ==
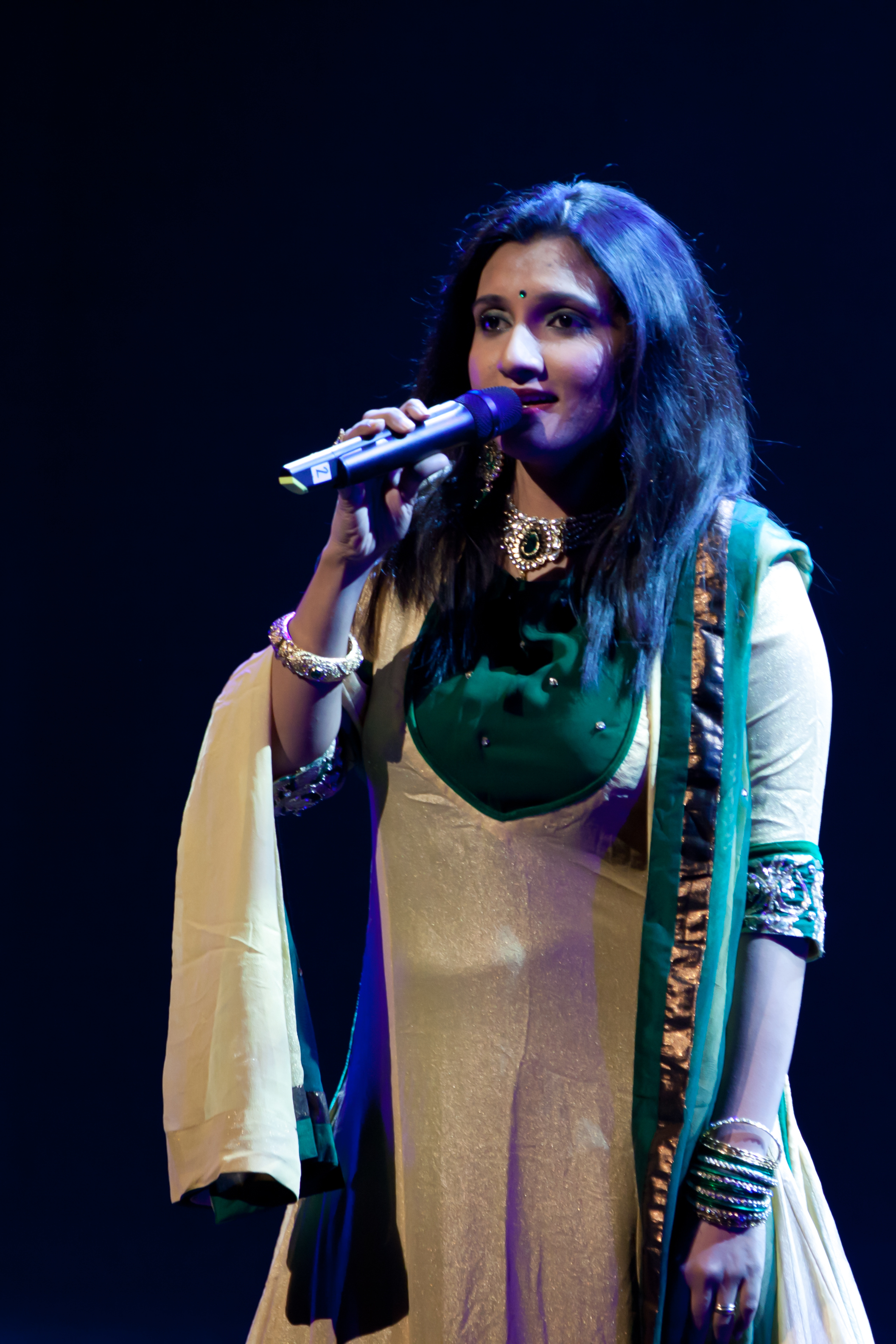
Manjari performing Live

Manjari was introduced into the world of film music by Ilaiyaraaja in the Sathyan Anthikad movie, Achuvinte Amma. She sang two songs in the movie, a duet 'Swasathin Thalam' with Dr. K.J. Yesudas and a solo 'Tamarakuruvikku' in the movie. Since her début, she has worked with the likes of Ramesh Narayan, Ilayaraaja, M. G. Radhakrishnan, Kaithapram Vishwanathan, Vidyasagar, M. Jayachandran, Ouseppachan, Mohan Sithara and the late Raveendran Master and Johnson master She has also sung for albums such as Balabhaskar's Mazhayil Aaro Oral. She has sung over 300+ songs in Malayalam, Tamil, Kannada and Telugu films and several devotional/Melody/Solo albums to her credit. Manjari also runs her own YouTube channel.

Since 2003, Manjari has performed Hindustani Classical concerts in India and the world over under the banner of "Soorya". Manjari also gained popularity as a Ghazal singer. She performed an exclusive Ghazal show titled 'Khayal' in 'Media One TV' featuring popular Ghazals of yesteryears.

Manjari won the Kerala State Film Award for the best female singer twice; first in 2004, for the song Mukilin makale in the film Makalkku and second in 2008 for the song Mullulla Murikkinmel in Vilapangalkappuram. Manjari is a playback singer and Live performer. She has set up her own band for Ghazal Concerts and performs at various venues in India and abroad. Manjari continues to pursue her studies in Hindustani Classical Music under the tutelage of Pandit Ramesh Julé of Kirana Gharana.

In 2016 she won the Sahir and Adeeb International Award for her contribution to Urdu and the genre of ghazals. Among the four recipients, she was the only Indian to receive the award in 2016. She is also the youngest Indian to receive the award. In the past Adeeb International has awarded the Sahir and Adeeb awards to almost 60 eminent personalities and legends like Gulzar, Javed Akhtar, Kaifi Azmi, B R Chopra, Shabana Azmi, Sharmila Tagore, Begum Bushra Rehman amongst others.

Films

== Films ==
Year	Film	Song(s)	Notes
2004	Vamanapuram Bus Route	Thane En	
2005	Ponmudipuzhayorathu	Oru Chiri Kandal	
2005	Ponmudipuzhayorathu	Mankutty	
2005	Achuvinte Amma	Thamarakuruvikku	Asianet Award
2005	Achuvinte Amma	Swasathin Thalam	
2005	Makalkku	Mukilin Makalee	Kerala State Award
2005	Kochi Rajavu	Kinavin Kilikale	
2005	Daivanamathil	Ezham Baharinte	
2005	Anandabhadram	Pinakkamaano	
2006	Out of Syllabus	Poi varuvaan	Hamma hamma ho
2006	Rasathanthram	Attinkara	Asianet Award
2006	Rasathanthram	Ponnavani Paadam	
2006	Moonamathoral	Nilavinte	
2006	Vadakkumnathan	Paahi Param Porule	
2006	Baba Kalyani	Kai Niraye	
2006	Classmates	Chillu Jalaka Vathilil	
2006	Note Book	Iniyum Mounamo	
2006	Photographer	Enthe Kannanu	
2006	Karutha Pakshikal	Mazhayil	
2006	Pothan Vava	Nerane	
2007	Vinodayathra	Kaiyetha Kombathu	
2007	Hello	Mazhavillin Neelima, Bhajan	
2007	Nasrani	Eeran Meghame	
2007	Sooryan	Ishtakaari	
2007	Paradesi	Ananda Kannerin	
2007	Hallo	Mazhavillin	
2007	Mayavi	Muttathe Mulle	
2007	Ali Bhai	Punchiri	
2007	Veeralipattu	Aalilayum	
2008	Positive	Orikkal née paranju	
2008	Vilapangalkappuram	Mullulla Murikkinmel	Kerala State Award
2008	Minnaminnikootam	Kadalolam	
2008	Novel	Onninumallaathe	
2008	Novel	Urangan Nee Enikku	
2009	Pazhassi Raja	Ambum Kombum	
2009	Love in Singapore	Magic Magic	
2009	Bharya Swantham Suhurthu	Mandara Manavatty	
2009	Chattambinadu	Mukkuti Chand	
2009	My Big Father	Nirathingale	
2009	Vellathooval	Kaatoram	
2010	Yakshiyum Njanum	Thenundo Poove	
2010	Music Video	Chandala-bhikshuki (based on Mahakavi Kumaran Asan's poem)	Ajayan (director), Actors: Tom George Kolath as Ananda bhikshu (Buddha's disciple) and Jyothirmayi as Matangi (Chandala woman)
2010	Neelambari	Indraneela Raaviloode	
2010	Plus Two	Manjadi Choppulla	
2010	Holidays	Thamara Valaya	
2010	D Nova	Oru Nertha	
2011	Puthumukhangal	Manimalar Kaavil	
2011	Sahapathi 1975	Rakthapushpame	
2011	Urumi	Chinni Chinni	*Various Awards – See Below
2011	China Town	Innu Penninu	
2011	Aazhakadal	Ponmeghathin	
2011	Uppukandam Brothers 2	Ishtam Nin Ishtam	
2011	Raghuvinte Swantham Rasiya	Kaatte Nee Kando	
2011	Mohabbath	Thennalin Kaikalil	
2011	Mohabbath	Atharu Peyyana	
2011	Veeraputhran	Inni Kadalin	
2011	Manushya Mrigam	Aalin Kombil	
2011	Sandwich	Paneneer Chempakangal	
2011	Makaramanju	Mosobathiya	
2011	Paachuvum Kovalanum	Manasse	
2011	Vellaripravinte Changathi	Naanam Chaalicha	
2012	Padmasree Saroj Kumar	Mozhikalum	
2012	Nadabrahmam	Pramadavaniyil	
2012	Navagatharkku Swagatham	Pokku Veyil	
2012	Arike	Ee Vazhiyil	
2012	Naughty Professor	Thalam Thiru Thalam	
2012	Cinema Company	Soni Lagdi	
2012	Grihanathan	Ragaveenayil	
2012	Manthrikan	Mukundante Vesham Kettum	
2012	My Boss	Enthinenariyilla	
2012	Maad Dad	Oru Naalum	
2012	Poppins	Valam Nadannu	
2012	Madirasi	Maari Poonkuyile	
2012	Chapters	Sandhya Sundara	
2013	Dracula	Manju Pole	
2013	Swasam	Vennilavin	
2013	Bangles	Ninakkai Ente Janmam	
2013	Pakaram	Parayan Ariyatha	
2013	Pakaram	Dooram Theera	
2013	Radio	Mukile Anadhiaai	
2013	Ladies and Gentleman	Kandathinappuram	
2013	Thomson Villa	Poo Thumbi Va	
2013	Thomson Villa	Mukkuttikal	
2014	How Old are You	Va Vayassu Chollidan	
2014	Avarude Veedu	Melle Manasinte	
2015	Anarkali	Aa Oruthi	
2015	Njan Samvidhanam Cheyyum	Maranno Swarangal	
2015	Chirakodinja Kinavukal	Omale Aromale	
2016	Puthiya Niyamam	Penninu Chilambunde	
2016	King Liar	Perumnuna Puzha	
2017	Cappuccino	Engane Padendu	
2018	My Story	Pathungi	
2018	Khaleefa	Kandeppol Pandu Pande	
2018	Khaleefa	Maathalappoo Mottu	
2018	Thattinppurathu Achuthan	Mangalakaraka	
2019	Pathinettam Padi	Vanchi bhoomi pathe	
2019	March Randam vazham	Tharapadam paadum	Kerala Film Critics Association Award
2021	Varthamanam	Anuragam	
2021	Aanu(Yes)	ManamOru Chirakayi	Music Director/BGM/Singer-Manjari
2021	Nokkukuthi	Pakalaruthiyavunnu	
2022	Ayisha	Vadakku Dhikkile	
2022	Iru	Kankaliluyir	
2022	Nannayikoode	Neeyam Kattin	
2022	Puliyattam	Thaalam Kotti	
2023	Tha Thavalayude Tha	Mizhiyilaaranu	
2023	Rani: The Real Story	Ellorem	
2025	e valayam	Neelakuyile	

== Discography ==
Year	Film	No	Song	Composer(s)	Lyricist(s)	Co-artist(s)
2004	Vamanapuram Bus Route	1	"Thane Thamburu"	Sanjeev lal	Gireesh Puthanchery	
2004	Shambu	2	"Pallakk"	Jassie Gift	Kaithapram Damodaran Namboothiri	Karthik
2005	Makalkku	3	"Mukilin Makale"	Ramesh Narayan	Kaithapram Damodaran Namboothiri	
2005	Achuvinte Amma	4	"Thamarakuruvikk"	Ilayaraja	Gireesh Puthanchery	Chorus
2005	Achuvinte Amma	5	"Swasathin Thalam"	Ilayaraja	Gireesh Puthanchery	K. J. Yesudas
2005	Ponmudipuzhayorathu	6	"Oru Chiri Kandal"	Ilayaraja	Gireesh Puthanchery	Vijay Yesudas
2005	Ponmudipuzhayorathu	7	"Vazhimaroo Vazhimaroo"	Ilayaraja	Gireesh Puthanchery	Vidhu Prathap, Vijay Yesudas, Asha Menone
2005	Ponmudipuzhayorathu	8	"Maankutty Mainakutty"	Ilayaraja	Gireesh Puthanchery	Vidhu Prathap, Ilayaraja, Asha Menone
2005	Kochirajavu	9	"Kianvin Kilikale"	Vidyasagar	Gireesh Puthanchery	Karthik
2005	Ananthabhadram	10	"Pinakkamano Ennodinakkamano"	M. G. Radhakrishnan	Gireesh Puthanchery	M.G.Sreekumar
2005	Daivanamathil	11	"Eazham Baharinte"	Kaithapram Viswanthan	Kaithapram Damodaran Namboothiri	
2005	Thommanum Makkalum	12	"Nerazhak (Duet version)"	Alex Paul	Kaithapram Damodaran Namboothiri	Biju Narayanan
2005	Twinkle Twinkle Little Star (film)	13	"Chilanka Chilanka"	Ilayaraja	B.R.Prasad	Afsal, Vijay Yesudas, Asha Menone
2005	Vacation	14	"Virahathamburu"	Dr G Renjith	Sohan Roy	
2005	Seelabathi	15	"Nirayouvanathinte"	Ramesh Narayan	Prabha Varma	Madhu Balakrishnan
2005	Izhra	16	"Vellithinkal (female version) "	Sunny Viswanath	Kaithapram Damodaran Namboothiri	Delsi Nainan
2005	Moksham	17	"Mayyanikannurang"	Balabhaskar	Kavalam Narayana Panicker	
2005	Chatrapati (Dubbed Malayalam Version)	18	"A Pluso"	M. M. Keeravani	Sudhamsu	Anwar Sadath
2006	Rasathanthram	19	"Ponnavani Padamneele"	Ilayaraja	Gireesh Puthanchery	Madhu Balakrishnan
2006	Rasathanthram	20	"Aattinkarayorathu"	Ilayaraja	Gireesh Puthanchery	
2006	Vadakkumnathan	21	"Paahiparam Porule"	Raveendran	Gireesh Puthanchery	Raveendran, Sindhu Premkumar
2006	Vrindavanam (2006 film)	22	"Ramzan Nilavinte (Duet version)"	C.V.Renjith	Gireesh Puthanchery	Madhu Balakrishnan
2006	Vrindavanam (2006 film)	23	"Ramzan Nilavinte"(Female version)	C.V.Renjith	Gireesh Puthanchery	
2006	Out of Syllabus	24	"Poyvaruvaan"(Female version)	Bennet Veetraag	Rafeeq Ahammed	
2006	Thanthra	25	"Gooda Manthra"(Duet version)	Alex Paul	Subhash Cherthala	Madhu Balakrishnan
2006	Nilavupole	26	"Maaghamaasa Vela"	Raj–Koti	Rajeev Alungal	Madhu Balakrishnan
2006	Nilavupole	27	"Oo Premam Pakaran"	Raj–Koti	Rajeev Alungal	Vidhu Prathap
2006	Nilavupole	28	"Ee Kshanam"	Raj–Koti	Rajeev Alungal	
2006	Classmates	29	"Chillujalaka Vathil"	Alex Paul	Vayalar Sarathchandra Varma	
2006	Syaamam	30	"Pinchukidaangale"	Sharreth	Subhadra	
2006	Photographer (film)	31	"Enthe Kannanu"	Johnson	Kaithapram Damodaran Namboothiri	K. J. Yesudas
2006	Photographer (film)	32	"Enthe Kannanu"(Female version)	Johnson	Kaithapram Damodaran Namboothiri	
2006	Karutha Pakshikal	33	"Mazhayil Rathrimazhayil"	Mohan Sithara	Vayalar Sarathchandra Varma	
2006	Oruvan (2006 film)	34	"Kannippenne"	Ouseppachan	Vayalar Sarathchandra Varma	Ouseppachan
2006	Moonnamathoral	35	"Nilaavinte"(Duet version)	Ouseppachan	Gireesh Puthanchery	G. Venugopal
2006	Moonnamathoral	36	"Nilaavinte"(Female version)	Ouseppachan	Gireesh Puthanchery	
2006	Notebook (2006 film)	37	"Iniyum mounamo"	Mejo Joseph	Vayalar Sarathchandra Varma	K. J. Yesudas
2006	Pothan Vava	38	"Nerane Ellam Nerane"	Alex Paul	Vayalar Sarathchandra Varma	Madhu Balakrishnan, Reju Joseph
2006	Jayam (2006 film)	39	"Kanneril"(female version)	Sonu Sisupal	B.R.Prasad	
2006	Jayam (2006 film)	40	"Thulumbidum"	Sonu Sisupal	B.R.Prasad	
2006	Baba Kalyani (film)	41	"Kainiraye Vennatharam"	Alex Paul	Vayalar Sarathchandra Varma	
2006	Baalyam	42	"Mazhavillin"	Sanjeev Lal	Biju Bhasker	
2006	Lakshmi (2006 film)[D]	43	"Thaara Thazhukum Thaara"	Ramana Gogula	Rajeev Alungal	Biju Narayanan
2006	Lakshmi (2006 film)[D]	44	"Thulumbidum"	Ramana Gogula	Rajeev Alungal	Shankar Mahadevan, Jassie Gift
2006	Boss I Love You [D]	45	"Allimottu"	Kalyani Malik	Rajiv Alungal	Anwar Sadath
2006	Boss I Love You [D]	46	"Vidaparayum"	Kalyani Malik	Rajiv Alungal	Sudeep Kumar
2006	Devadas [D]	47	"Parayam Oru"	Chakri	Gireesh Puthanchery	G.Venugopal
2006	Devadas [D]	48	"En Ponne"	Chakri	Gireesh Puthanchery	Arun
2006	Devadas [D]	49	"Manasse Manasse"(Version 2)	Chakri	Gireesh Puthanchery	Arun
2006	Devadas [D]	50	"Manasse Manasse"	Chakri	Gireesh Puthanchery	Arun
2006	Devadas [D]	51	"Entho Entho"	Chakri	Gireesh Puthanchery	Ravisankar
2007	Paradesi (2007 film)	52	"Aandakanneerin"	Ramesh Narayan	Rafeeq Ahammed	Sujatha Mohan
2007	Mayavi (2007 film)	53	"Muttathemulle chollu"(Duet version)	Alex Paul	Vayalar Sarathchandra Varma	K. J. Yesudas
2007	Mayavi (2007 film)	54	"Muttathemulle chollu"(Female version)	Alex Paul	Vayalar Sarathchandra Varma	
2007	Changathipoocha	55	"Shararaanthal Minninilkkum"	Ouseppachan	Gireesh Puthanchery	Vineeth Sreenivasan
2007	Abraham & Lincoln	56	"Uduraajamukhi"	Ouseppachan	Balachandran Chullikkadu	
2007	Vinodayathra	57	"Kayyethakombatho"	Ilayaraja	Vayalar Sarathchandra Varma	
2007	Hallo (2007 film)	58	"Mazhavillin Neelima"	Alex Paul	Vayalar Sarathchandra Varma	Afsal, Sangeetha Sreekanth
2007	Hallo (2007 film)	59	"Bhajan"	Alex Paul	Vayalar Sarathchandra Varma	Akhila Anand, Andriya
2007	Veeralipattu (2007 film)	60	"Aalilayum Kattalayum"(Female version)	Viswajith	Vayalar Sarathchandra Varma	
2007	Veeralipattu (2007 film)	61	"Aalilayum Kattalayum"(Duet version)	Viswajith	Vayalar Sarathchandra Varma	Vineeth Sreenivasan
2007	Nasrani (film)	62	"Earanmeghame"	Bijibal	Anil Panachooran	Chorus
2007	Ali Bhai	63	"Puniirikkana"	Alex Paul	Gireesh Puthanchery	M. G. Sreekumar, Liji Francis
2007	Romeoo	64	"Palkkadalilunarum" (Duet version)	Alex Paul	Vayalar Sarathchandra Varma	Sankaran Namboothiri
2007	Romeoo	65	"Palakadalilunarum" (Female version)	Alex Paul	Vayalar Sarathchandra Varma	
2007	Sooryan (2007 film)	66	"Ishttakkarikku"	Ilayaraja	Gireesh Puthanchery	Madhu Balakrishnan
2007	Thakarachenda	67	"Kunju Kunju Pakshi"	Siby Kuruvila	Vijeesh Calicut	
2007	A. K. G. (film)	68	"Varunennurappulla"	Johnson	Kunjappa Pattanoor	
2007	Challenge [D]	69	"Kunnamkulam"	M. M. Keeravani	Siju Thuravoor	
2007	Yogi (2007 film) [D]	70	"Ida Kothiya"	Ramana Gogula	Siju Thuravoor	Afsal
2007	Bunny [D]	71	"Nee Arijuvo"	Devisri Prasad	Siju Thuravoor	Devanand
2007	Hero [D]	72	"Gilli Gilli"	Chakri	Siju Thuravoor	Afsal
2007	Malleswari : The Princess [D]	73	"Vellikolussaninju"	Raj–Koti	Rajeev Alungal	Vidhu Prathap
2007	Happy Days [D]	74	"Vidachollam"	Mickey. J. Meyer	Rajeev Alungal	Shankar Mahadevan
2007	Happy Days [D]	75	"Sayanora"	Mickey. J. Meyer	Rajeev Alungal	Renjith Govind
2007	Deviyin Thiruvilaiyadal [D]	76	"Kalam Kanakkezhuthum"	M.S.Viswanathan	Bharanikkavu Sivakumar	
2007	Naayakan [D]	77	"Nisanadi"	Ilayaraja	Bharanikkavu Sivakumar	Pradeep Palluruthy
2007	Naayakan [D]	78	"Allimanimegham"	Ilayaraja	Bharanikkavu Sivakumar	Vidhu Prathap
2007	Snehamanassu [D]	79	"Chandanameghathin"	M. M. Keeravani	Bharanikkavu Sivakumar	Ravisankar
2007	Snehamanassu [D]			M. M. Keeravani	Bharanikkavu Sivakumar	"Kurikikoo"
2022	Tha Thavalayude Tha	80	"Mizhiyilaaranu"	Nikhil Rajan	Beeyar Prasad	Kapil Kapilan
2025	e valayam	81	"Neelakkuyile"	Jerry Amaldev	Santhosh varma	

=== Singles ===
In 2014, Manjari released her first Hindi Single titled 'Aiy Aiy Yaa' with Crescendo Music. The Lyrics of Alok Jha is composed by Santosh Nair. The video was shot in exotic locations of Dubai.

In 2015, Manjari released a Malayalam single titled 'Anuragam' which was composed and sung by the artist. She also featured in the video shot in Munnar under the direction of VK Prakash.

She has also sung title songs for several Malayalam television series like Swami Ayyapan, Ente Manasaputhri, Krishnakripasagaram, Jalam, Sreekrishnaleela, Ammakkilikkoodu and Amme Bhagavathy.

Manjari released her very first original Ghazal titled “Ab Etbaar Nahi” on 22 September 2020. This musical which is her own composition penned by Moid Rasheedi, won millions of hearts within the first day of release.

Manjari has composed her own ghazals and released it on her YouTube channel (Manjari Official Channel - Singer). The two ghazals penned by Moid Rasheedi has been sung and composed by Manjari. The ghazals "Chale Aaoo" and "Mujhe Yaad Hai Vo Mausam" has reached the hearts of many and received lots of accolades from across the world.

Television

- Smart Singer as Judge
- Pathinalam Raavu as Judge
- Khayal as Host and concept creator (Media One)
- Surya Super Singer as Judge (Surya TV)
- Star Singer Season 8 as Judge (Asianet)
- Star Singer Junior Season 3 as Judge (Asianet)
- Start Music Aaradhyam Paadum season 5 as Guest (Asianet)
- Musical Wife (Flowers TV)

Appeared Films

- Positive 2008
- Rock Star 2015
- Varthamanam 2019

Others

- Kerala Government Initiative - Praveshanolsavam (2023)

Appeared TV Serials

- Aa Amma
- Amme Bhagavathy

== Awards ==
Kerala State Film Awards:

- 2004 – Best Playback Singer – Makalkku ('Mukilin Makale')
- 2008 – Best Playback Singer – Vilapangalkappuram ('Mullulla Murikkinmel')

Asianet Film Awards:

- 2006 – Best Female Playback – Rasathanthram ('Attinkara')

Mathrubhumi Film Awards:

- 2006 – Best Female Playback – Karuthapakshikal ('Mazhayil Ratrimazhayil')
- 2012 – Mathrubhumi Film Awards – Popular Singer of the Year -Urumi ('Chinni Chinni')

Kerala Film Critics Association Awards:

- 2012– Best Playback Singer (Female) -Urumi ('Chinni Chinni')
- 2019– Best Playback Singer (Female) -March Randam Vyazham ('Tharapadham paadum')

Film Awards:

- 2012 – Vanitha Film Awards – Best Female Playback -Urumi ('Chinni Chinni')
- 2012 – Ramu Kariat Film Awards – Best Female Playback- Urumi ('Chinni Chinni')
- 2012 – Surya/Film Producers Awards- Best Female Playback – Urumi ('Chinni Chinni')
- 2012 – Amrita Film Awards- Best Female Playback – Urumi ('Chinni Chinni')
- 2012 – Jaihind Film Awards- Best Female Playback – Urumi ('Chinni Chinni')
- 2012 – Kerala Film Critics Award- Best Female Playback
- Nominated : 2009 – Filmfare Award for Best Female Playback for "Kadaloram Vatsa" from Minnaminnikoottam
- Nominated : 2011 – Filmfare Award for Best Female Playback for "Chimmi Chimmi" from Urumi

Sahir and Adeeb International Award:

- 2016 – Sahir and Adeeb International Award for her contribution to Urdu language and ghazals

== Television ==
List of television credits
Year	Title	Role	Channel	Notes
2013	Khayaal	Host	MediaOne TV	hosted more than 275+ episodes
2020-2022	Star Singer Senior Season 8	Judge	Asianet	Judge along with K. S. Chitra, Sharreth, G. Venugopal, Stephen Devassy
2022-2023	Star Singer Junior Season 3	Judge	Asianet	Judge along with Sithara Krishnakumar, Kailas Menon, Stephen Devassy
2025	Super Star Junior	Judge	Amrita TV	Judge along with Sharreth, Shaan Rahman
2025	Super Star Senior	Judge	Amrita TV	Judge along with Sharreth, Shaan Rahman
