= In Harihar Nagar =

1990 Indian film by Siddique-Lal

- Poster
- Directed by: Siddique-Lal
- Written by: Siddique-Lal
- Produced by: Khais-Kuriachan
- Starring: Mukesh; Siddique; Jagadish; Ashokan
- Cinematography: Venu
- Edited by: Gaurishekar K. R.
- Music by: S. Balakrishnan
- Production company: Mohsin Priya Combines
- Distributed by: Swargachitra
- Release date: 8 November 1990
- Country: India
- Language: Malayalam

In Harihar Nagar is a 1990 Indian Malayalam-language comedy thriller film written and directed by Siddique-Lal. The story of the film, set in the fictional locality of Harihar Nagar, follows four unemployed bachelors and friends: Mahadevan, Govindan Kutty, Appukuttan and Thomas Kutty, who attempts to woo their new neighbour Maya, who is in town to investigate the mysterious circumstances surrounding the death of her brother Sethumadhavan. It stars Mukesh, Siddique, Jagadish and Ashokan in the lead roles, while Geetha Vijayan, Rizabawa, Kaviyoor Ponnamma and Rekha, with Suresh Gopi and Sai Kumar making cameo appearances. The music was composed by S. Balakrishnan.

In Harihar Nagar was released on 8 November 1990. The film was the second highest grossing Malayalam film of the year and ran for more than 100 days in theatres. The film is widely celebrated as one of the most popular Malayalam comedy films ever and has over the years gained a cult following, spawning two sequels — 2009's 2 Harihar Nagar, and 2010's In Ghost House Inn — and remakes in Hindi (Parda Hai Parda and Dhol), Kannada (Nagaradalli Nayakaru), Tamil (MGR Nagaril), and Telugu (Madhura Nagarilo). Its success also spawned a series of unrelated low budget comedy films featuring the principal cast, in the years that followed.

== Plot ==
The movie begins in Mumbai. We see a man with a briefcase get into a van. He arrives at a hotel, where he exchanges briefcases with a second man in the lobby. The second man takes his new briefcase upstairs and delivers it to a third man in a hotel room. The third man then flees the hotel, escaping into a waiting car only moments before two men catch up to him. The car drives off but then stops. The driver shoots the third man in the head, takes the briefcase, and walks away.

The movie now moves to a year later, in Kerala. Mahadevan, Govindan, Appukuttan and Thomas are four young men who live in a housing colony in Kochi named "Harihar Nagar". They are unemployed bachelors and their main focus in life is women. Maya, a girl from Kannur, and her grandparents relocate to Harihar Nagar, and happen to be Mahadevan's new neighbours. Upon discovering their beautiful new neighbor, the four men spy on her to attempt to learn more about her. That night, Mahadevan and Appukuttan try to watch her bathing, but her grandmother sees their shadows out of her window and screams, chasing them away. They attempt various other methods to impress her, but all their plans backfire.

One day, they bribe the postman to get hold of the letter she sent. They learn that Maya has come to Harihar Nagar to learn about the death of her brother, a boxer named Sethumadhavan "Sethu", which she thinks was a suicide.

Maya visits the mother of a friend of her brother's whose name is Andrews at his house. She asks Andrews' mother, to contact her if she gets any information about her brother. The four men approach Andrews' mother and pretend to be Sethu's friends. They manage to get Sethu's photograph by telling him they wanted it for the colony's sports club. Maya gets this information from Andrews' mother and meets the four friends. She believes them to be Sethu's friends after seeing his photo at their house. Thomas Kutty meets her at the boxing club, faking that he is a boxer after knocking down the other three men who now fear Maya's grandparents because they suspect them. Thomas Kutty almost tells her the truth about Mahadevan, Appukuttan and Govindan Kutty, and only did not name them (calling them pickpockets and snatchers). They get angry. The four fabricate a story about how Sethu had an affair with a girl, and make her believe it by saying that the bike owner's henchmen who assault them are those of the parents of the girl, who opposed to the affair. They fight back the henchmen after letting Thomas Kutty get beaten up for a while because of his betrayal of them, and Maya believes them because they fake tears and sadness.

Hearing that the four men are friends of Sethu, Honai kidnaps them to retrieve the briefcase on the pretext that he would let them leave in ten minutes. Maya, in search of her brother's former lover, learns of Annie Philip, a friend of her brother's whom he knew from the library. Annie is now a nun in a convent, and has adopted the name Sister Josephine. Annie reveals her history with Sethu. She tells her that Andrews' father was a businessman who was murdered by Honai's father and had built a business empire with the money stolen from Andrews' father. Andrews sought to cause trouble in the business to take revenge. Honai's father sold all of his assets and tried to run away with the money in the briefcase, but was murdered by Andrews on the way. Later, Andrews is found dead on a beach and Sethu leaves to Andrews' house, keeping Andrews' mother ignorant of his death. He gives Annie the briefcase. After returning to Bombay, Sethu gives Honai a briefcase similar to the one given to Annie; when Honai opens it, he finds it is full of bricks. Furious, Honai kills Sethu. However, Annie is ignorant of the innocence of the four men and tells Maya that they are Honai's gangsters.

The four friends manage to escape, but are chased by him and his associates. Maya and her grandparents call the police because of the false information given by Annie about them. Maya and her grandparents are also kidnapped by Honai but the four friends rescue them. Andrews' mother finds out about Andrews' death from Annie, who gives her the briefcase. While Andrews' mother is cooking dinner, Honai comes to get the briefcase. Andrews' mother removes a fuse and the lights go out. After trying to find Andrews' mother, Honai unknowingly lights a lighter near the lit gas stove and burns to death.

In the end, Maya and her grandparents returns to Kannur. Maya gives the four friends the briefcase, which they open, finding it full of riches.

== Cast ==
- Mukesh as Mahadevan
- Siddique as Govindan Kutty
- Jagadish as Appukuttan
- Ashokan as Thomas Kutty
- Geetha Vijayan as Maya
- Rizabawa as John Honai
- Suresh Gopi as Sethumadhavan / Sethu, Maya's Brother (Extended Cameo)
- Sai Kumar as Andrews, Sethu's Friend (Extended Cameo)
- Kaviyoor Ponnamma as Andrews's Mother
- Rekha as Sister Josephine / Annie Philip
- Philomina as Sethumadhavan and Maya's Grandmother
- Paravoor Bharathan as Sethumadhavan and Maya's Grandfather
- Appa Haja as Cherian
- Thrissur Elsy as Mahadevan's Mother
- Dr. Jayan as Honai's Helper

== Production ==
=== Development ===
After directing the blockbuster Ramji Rao Speaking – which dealt with issues like unemployment and poverty, relevant social factors affecting Kerala of the 1980s, Siddique-Lal chose to set their second film, in a more laid back and fun environment. They decided to make a film that diverted from the usual commercial film that revolved around a hero and a heroine. The story was developed by Siddique and Lal from a thought which came to their minds, about a group of friends who gets mixed up in an issue due to the lies they make up, to woo a girl.

Siddique and Lal had developed a story called Kallila Kolangal during their days in Mimics Parade. In the story, there was a character of a professional killer named Honai. The story was eventually developed by Sreenivasan into Nadodikkattu (1987). In the film, the name of the professional killer was changed to Pavanayi. Hence, the name of the antagonist in In Harihar Nagar was taken from the story they had developed. The film was jointly produced by Fazil's brother Khais and Ouseppachan's brother Kuriachan. The film also marked the debut of Swargachitra Appachan's Swargachitra Pictures, which distributed the film.

=== Casting ===
Since Kuriachan and Khais were in Qatar, they put Fazil in charge of casting. Initially, Siddique and Lal had decided on Mukesh as Mahadevan, Jagadeesh as Appu, Appa Haja as Thomas and Ashokan as Govindan. Since the directors didn't have phones at the time, they sent the executive producer to talk to the actors and book their dates. The executive producer came back and told Siddique-Lal that everyone else except Jagadeesh was ready. The directors gave the role of Appu to Siddique, who was a mimicry artiste and had by then done minor roles in several films. A week before shooting began, Siddique-Lal went to Thiruvananthapuram for a discussion with Venu, who was the cinematographer. They chanced upon Jagadeesh at the railway station and asked him why he refused the role of Appukuttan. Jagadeesh however was surprised and told them that he wasn't even approached for the role. Jagadeesh told them that he and the executive producer weren't on good terms and used the opportunity to get back at him. The director duo then contacted Fazil and informed him of the situation. Fazil fired the executive producer on the spot. Then, Jagadeesh was given the role of Appukuttan and Siddique was given the role of Govindan. A new character, Cherian was developed for Appa Haji.

The role of John Honai was originally planned for Raghuvaran, but since he had clashing dates it was eventually given to Kalabhavan's Rizabawa, who was a well-known theatre and mimicry artiste. He had earlier acted as the lead in Shaji Kailas' Dr. Pasupathy. Rizabawa was initially reluctant to do a negative role but was persuaded by his friends at Kalabhavan. They cast Geetha Vijayan, a debutant and Revathi's first cousin in the role of the heroine. Rekha had expressed her wish to act in a film directed by Fazil. She was called by Fazil to the sets of the film. However, on learning that the film was directed by Siddique-Lal she was disappointed. To satisfy Rekha's wish Fazil offered to shoot her scenes.

== Soundtrack ==
The soundtrack features two songs composed by S. Balakrishnan, with lyrics penned by Bichu Thirumala. The songs were remixed and used by Alex Paul for 2 Harihar Nagar, the first sequel of this film.

=== Track listing ===
1. "Ekantha Chandrike" - M. G. Sreekumar, Unni Menon
2. "Unnam Marannu" - M. G. Sreekumar, Chorus

== Reception ==
In Harihar Nagar was released on 8 November 1990, in 22 centers in Kerala. The film received critical acclaim. The film was a commercial success, running for 75-days in 7 centers, a 100-day theatrical run in 5 centers and completing a 150-day run in 2 theatres. In an episode in Charithram Enniloode, Siddique had told that the film was very popular with college students and were instrumental in making the film a success.

=== Critical response ===
Upon release, the film received positive responses from critics. Rizabawa's charismatic portrayal of the antagonist, John Honai was praised. Alleppey Ashraf, in an interview with Safari TV in 2018 revealed that Rizabawa's performance in the film caught the attention of other filmmakers and he was offered to reprise his role as John Honai in all the remakes of the film, which he turned down. In 2019, Neelima Menon of The News Minute wrote: "It's how Siddique and Lal sneak in comedy at the most improbable scenes that makes In Harihar Nagar such a riot. Plus the goofy characters – each with their own brand of silliness, played with aplomb by Mukesh, Jagadeesh, Asokan and Siddique. With a lot of help from the queen mother of comedy, Philomena". In 2008, One India described the film as "among the most hilarious movies in Indian cinema".

== Sequels ==
Nineteen years after the release of the original, In Harihar Nagar had a sequel 2 Harihar Nagar directed by Lal of the director-duo Siddique-Lal. It was released on 1 April 2009. After its success, its sequel, named In Ghost House Inn, was released on 25 March 2010.

== Remakes ==
The world negative rights of the film belonged to Alleppey Ashraf. The Telugu remake rights of the film was acquired by Kodi Ramakrishna for a hitherto record price of ₹ 5 lakhs, while the Tamil remake rights of the film were acquired by R. B. Choudary for a sum of ₹ 2 Lakhs. Another Tamil version of the film, titled Idhu MGR Illam, was under production, but it did not materialize and was cancelled.

The film was remade in Tamil as MGR Nagaril (1991), in Telugu as Madhura Nagarilo (1991), in Kannada as Nagaradalli Nayakaru (1992) and twice in Hindi as Parda Hai Parda (1992) and Dhol (2007).

== Legacy ==
The film was a breakthrough in the careers of Siddique, Jagadeesh and Rizabawa. Mukesh's dialogue, "Thomassukutty vittodaa" has become a catchphrase.
