= Rizabawa =

Indian actor (1966–2021)

- Born: 24 September 1966; Kochi, Kerala, India
- Died: 13 September 2021 (aged 54); Kochi
- Occupation: Actor
- Years active: 1990–2021
- Children: 1

Rizabawa (24 September 1966 – 13 September 2021) was an Indian actor who worked predominantly in Malayalam films and television. His breakthrough role was as a villain in the 1990 film In Harihar Nagar. Since then, he acted as villain in several films in 1990s.

== Biography ==
Rizabawa started his career in theatre. Even though Rizabawa played the hero in his debut film Dr. Pasupathy directed by Shaji Kailas, his first noticed role in Malayalam films was from the director Duo Siddique-Lal in the movie In Harihar Nagar. His role as the villain, John Honai became a breakthrough role for him. He later moved into the small-screen industry, acting in a number of Malayalam serials. He continued to be a villain in many other films, including Irikku MD Akathundu, Vakkeel Vasudev, Thiruthalvaadi, and Malappuram Haji Mahanaya Joji. Later in his career, Rizabawa acted in the Malayalam film industry in supporting roles. He has also acted in many serials from 2002 until his death.

== Personal life ==
He has a daughter. He died from a kidney-related illness on 13 September 2021 as well as COVID-19 during the COVID-19 pandemic in India.

== Awards ==
Kerala State Film Awards

- 2010 – Best Dubbing Artist: – Karmayogi

== Filmography ==
=== Malayalam ===
==== 1980s ====
Year	Title	Role	Notes
1984	Vishupakshi		Not Released

==== 1990s ====
Year	Title	Role	Notes
1990	Dr. Pasupathy	Pappen	Debut
1990	In Harihar Nagar	John Honai	
1990	Sunday 7PM		
1991	Amina Tailors	Nassar	
1991	Kalari		
1991	Daivasahayam Lucky Centre	Anil	
1991	Agninilavu	Dinesh	
1991	Sundhari Kakka	Fr. Samuel	
1991	Georgootty C/O Georgootty	Prakash	
1991	Bhoomika	Rameshan	
1991	Athirathan		
1991	Aanaval Mothiram	Commissioner Sajith Kumar	
1991	Irrikku M.D. Akathudu		
1992	Soorya Manasam	Stephan	
1992	Priyapetta Kukku		
1992	Champakulam Thachan	Thommikunju	
1992	Neelakurukkan		
1992	Thiruthalvaadi	Wilfred	
1992	Ezhara Ponnana	Ramu	
1992	Ente Ponnu Thampuran	Sreekumar	
1992	Maanthrika Cheppu	Jackson	
1992	First Bell	Krishnakumar	
1992	Daivathinte Vikrithikal	Micheal	
1992	Congratulations Miss Anitha Menon		
1993	Aparna		
1993	Sarovaram	Rajalakshmi's old friend	
1993	Uppukandam Brothers	Pramod	
1993	Vakkeel Vasudev	Stephen d'Souza	
1993	Bandhukkal Sathrukkal	Asokan Chattambi	
1993	Aayirappara	Bhanu Vikrama Kaimal	
1993	Bhoomi Geetham	Chandradas	
1993	Gandhari	Minister	
1993	Thalamura		
1994	Kabooliwala	Venu	
1994	Chukkan	Vishwan	
1994	Tharavadu		
1994	Avan Ananda Padmanabhan		
1994	Manathe Kottaram	Police Commissioner	
1994	Malappuram Haji Mahanaya Joji	Jaffar Khan	
1994	Vadhu Doctoranu	Purushothaman	
1995	Aniyan Bava Chetan Bava	Kannappan	
1995	Mangalam Veettil Manaseswari Gupta	Sethumadhavan	
1995	Sargavasantham		
1995	Peterscott		
1995	Thakshashila	Stephen Fernandes	
1995	Street	Police Officer	
1995	Sreeragam	Narasimhan	
1995	Hijack	Prasad	
1995	Sasinas		
1995	Kalamasseriyil Kalyanayogam	Anantharaman	
1996	Naalamkettile Nalla Thambimar		
1996	Sugavasam	Naresh Mehta	
1996	Man of the Match	Swamy Paramananda	
1996	Udyanapalakan		
1997	Nagarapuranam	Jayamohan	
1997	Bhoothakkannadi	Guard at prison	
1997	Asuravamsam	Muhammad Hussain Haji	
1997	Katha Nayakan		
1997	Kannur		
1997	Shibiram		
1997	Vamsam		
1997	Manasam	Doctor	
1998	Thattakam		
1998	Ormacheppu		
1998	Sooryavanam	Terrorist Gurudas	
1999	The Godman	C.I. Joseph Chacko	
1999	Ezhupunna Tharakan	DYSP Gopinathan Varma	
1999	Niram	Jinan	
1999	Crime File	Minister Thomas	

==== 2000s ====
Year	Title	Role	Notes
2000	Rapid Action Force		
2000	Summer Palace		
2000	Life Is Beautiful	Sindhu's Manager	
2000	Varnakkazhchakal	Thomachan	
2000	Cover Story	Retd. DGP R.V. Thampuran	
2000	The Gang		
2001	Onnam Raagam		
2001	Maalavika		
2001	Sravu	Sudeeran Pilla	
2001	Punyam		
2002	Ente Hridyathinte Udama		
2002	Sundariprav		
2002	Pakalppooram	Suryamangalathu Brahmadathan Namboothiri	
2002	Oomappenninu Uriyadappayyan	Mukunda Varma	
2002	Kuberan	Thampuran	
2003	Meerayude Dukhavum Muthuvinte Swapnavum	Advocate	
2003	Ivar	Prem Kumar	
2004	Mayilattam		
2004	Jalolsavam		
2004	Vismayathumbathu	V. B. Prathapan	
2004	Thekkekkara Superfast	Antappan	
2005	Maanikyan	Sekhara Menon	
2005	Hridayathil Sookshikkan		
2005	Nerariyan CBI	Dr. Babu	
2006	Highway Police	Bhoominathan	
2006	Bada Dosth	Ravindranath Khurana	
2006	Mahasamudram	Mattakara Chandran	
2006	Balram vs. Tharadas	Hussain Sahib	
2006	Kisan	Balaraman Varma	
2006	Vadakkumnadhan	Shankarankutty Master	
2007	Romeoo	Ramanathan	
2007	Hallo	Dinu Bhai	
2007	Bharathan Effect		
2007	Kichamani MBA	Finance & Excise Minister Bahuleyan	
2007	Nagaram	Enashu Vakkeel	
2007	Nasrani	Eappachan	
2007	Paradesi		
2008	Mulla	Venu	
2008	College Kumaran	Vikraman	
2008	Sound of Boot	Retd. DYSP Abdul Sathar	
2008	Twenty 20		Photo Archive
2009	Ali Imran		
2009	Duplicate	Mahendran Thampi	
2009	Thirunakkara Perumal		
2009	2 Harihar Nagar	John Honai	Cameo

==== 2010s ====
Year	Title	Role	Notes
2010	Avan	George Mathew	
2010	Pokkiri Raja	Home Minister Kumaran	
2010	Chaverpada		
2010	Sahasram		
2011	Swargam 9 km		
2011	Ponnu Kondoru Aalroopam		
2012	Sthalam		
2012	Ee Adutha Kaalathu	Madhuri's father	
2012	The King & the Commissioner	Minister Kondotti Ibrahim	
2012	Vaidooryam	Shekharan	
2012	Simhasanam		
2012	Track		
2012	The Hitlist	DGP	
2012	Veendum Kannur	Divakaran	
2013	Aakashanagaram		
2013	Village Guys		
2013	Police Maman		
2013	Proprietors: Kammath & Kammath	Sulaiman Sahib	
2013	Paisa Paisa		
2013	Mizhi		
2013	Ente		
2013	Zachariayude Garbhinikal		
2014	Asha Black	Rohit's father	Bilingual film
2015	Nirnayakam	KT Chandrasekhar	
2015	John Honai	Devanarayanan	
2015	Kohinoor	Xavier	
2015	Tharakangale Sakshi		
2017	Stethoscope		
2018	Pranayatheertham		
2018	Velakkaariyaayirunthalum Neeyen Mohavalli		
2019	Aarodum Parayathe		

==== 2020s ====
Year	Title	Role	Notes
2021	One	R. Bhaskaran	
2022	Lal Jose		
2022	Mahaveeryar		

=== Other language ===
Year	Title	Role	Language	Notes
1994	Thendral Varum Theru		Tamil	
2006	Kasu	Dileep	Tamil	
2013	Avanthipuram		Telugu	
2014	Nee Naan Nizhal	Rohit's father	Tamil	Bilingual film

=== As dubbing artist ===
Year	Film	Dubbed for	Character
2011	Pranayam	Anupam Kher	Achutha Menon
2011	Sevenes	Mahadevan	Ramakrishna Moorthy
2012	Karmayogi	Thalaivasal Vijay	
2012	Nidra	Thalaivasal Vijay	Madhava Menon
2012	The Hitlist	Thalaivasal Vijay	IG Robert Joseph
2022	Aquarium	V. K. Prakash	

=== Television ===
Serial	Channel	year	Notes
Namam Japikunna Veedu	Mazhavil Manorama	2020-2021	
Thenum Vayambum	Surya TV	2018-2019	
Kana Kanmani (TV series)	Asianet	2016	Replaced Sanjay Asrani
Shivakami	Surya TV	2015	
Bhagyalakshmi	Surya TV	2014	
Dhathuputhri	Mazhavil Manorama	2014	
Aniyathi (TV series)	Mazhavil Manorama	2014	
Kattukurangu	Amrita TV	2013	
Ardram	Asianet	2012	
Rudhraveena	Surya TV	2011	
Vigraham	Asianet	2009	
Priyamanasi	Surya TV	2008	
Annu Peytha Mazhayil	Asianet	2007-2008	
Sathyam	Amrita TV	2007	
Manthrakodi	Asianet	2005	
Dambathya geethangal	Asianet	2004	
Sthreehridayam	Surya TV	2004	
Vivahitha	Asianet	2002	
"Anna"	Kairali	2002	
Valsalyam	Surya TV	2002	
Vajram	Asianet	2000-2001	
Charulatha	Surya TV	2000	
