= Rimi Tomy =

Indian singer and actress

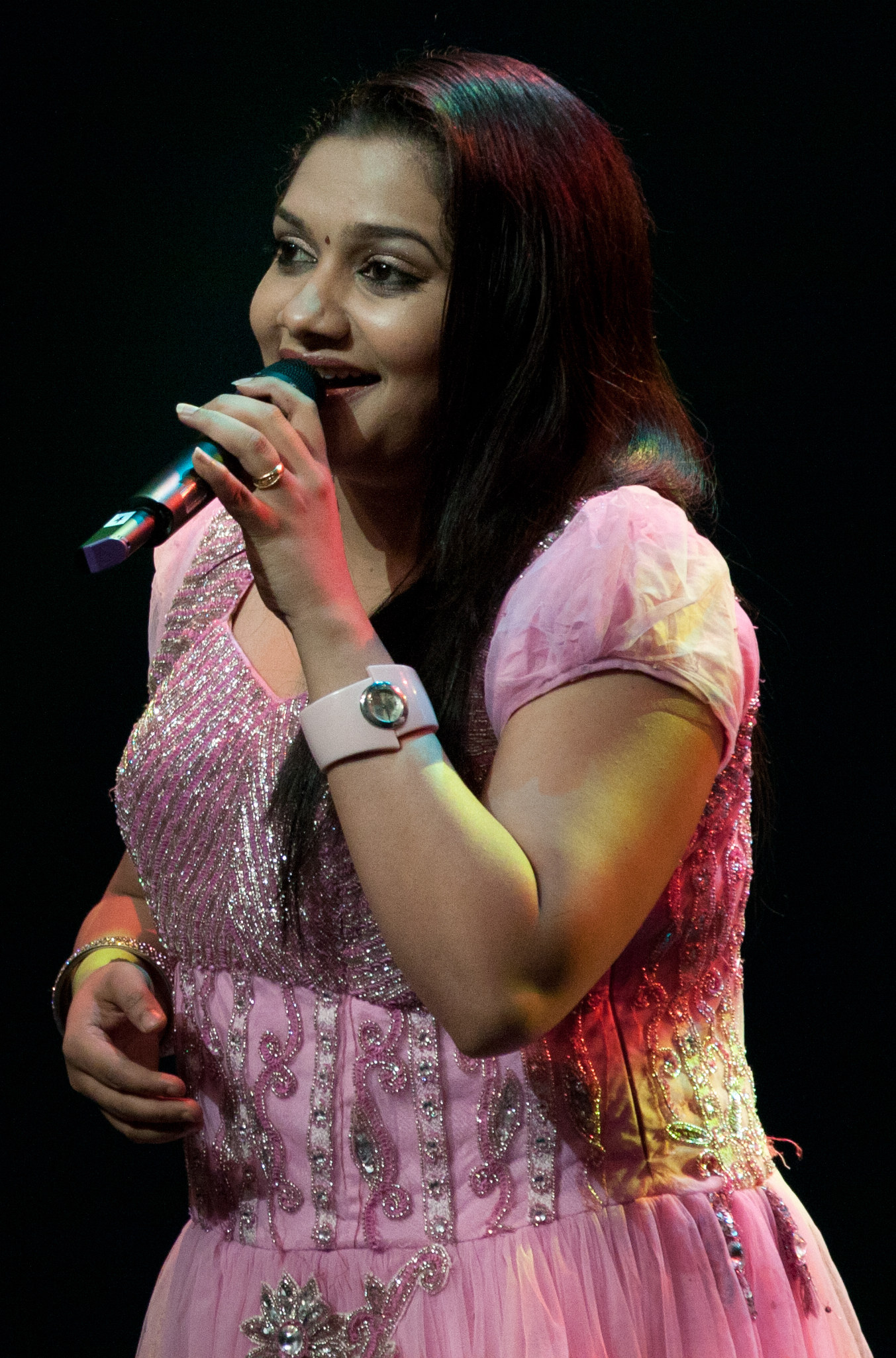
- Born: Rimi Tomy; Pala, Kottayam district, Kerala
- Occupation: Playback singer, Carnatic musician, television host, actress
- Years active: 1995–present
- Spouse: Royce Kizhakoodan (m. 2008; div. 2019) Libin Mathew (m.2026)
- Relatives: Rinku Tomy (brother), Reenu Tomy (sister), Muktha George (sister-in-law)

Rimi Tomy is an Indian playback singer, Carnatic musician, television host and actress. She started her career by anchoring music programs in television and sang her first song "Chingamasam Vannu Chernnal" in the 2002 film Meesa Madhavan with co-singer Shanker Mahadevan.

She was previously married to businessman Royce Kizhakoodan from 2008 until their divorce in 2019. In November 2026, she married mumbai based fitness trainer Libin Mathew. Her brother Rinku Tomy is married to actress Muktha.

She has anchored a number of television shows and has judged many reality shows of different genres throughout her career. She made her debut as actress in the Aashiq Abu film 5 Sundarikal. She enacted her first lead role opposite Jayaram in the 2015 film Thinkal Muthal Velli Vare.

She has also appeared in the song sequences of films like Balram Vs Tharadas, Kaaryasthan and 916. She has also acted in many advertisements.

== Early life ==
Rimi was born at Pala in the Kottayam district of Kerala to Tomy Joseph and Rani. She studied at St. Mary's School and then at the Alphonsa College in Pala. She has a sister, Reenu Tomy, and a brother, Rinku Tomy. Her father died on 6 July 2014 due to a cardiac arrest.

== Career ==
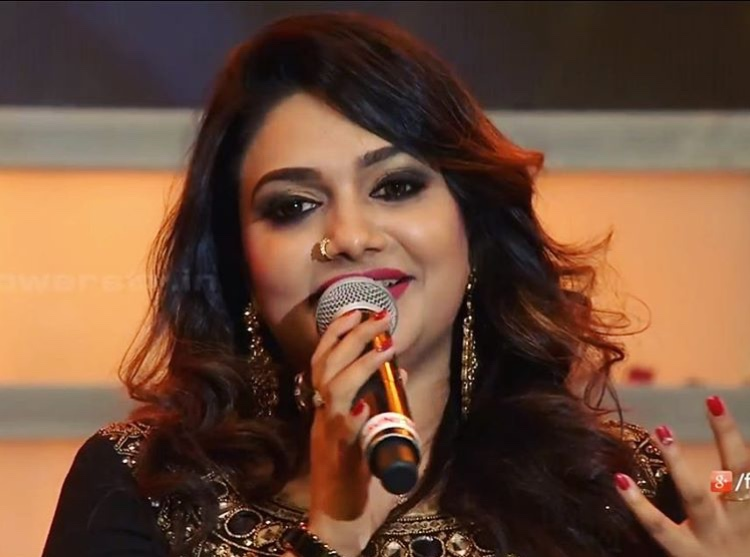

She started her career as a singer with the troupe Angel Voice. It was during a show with Angel Voice that mimicry artist, composer, and lyricist Nadirshah spotted her and recommended her to Meesa Madhavan, film director Lal Jose, and film composer Vidyasagar. It was from there that her singing career skyrocketed.

== Personal life ==
Rimi married businessman Royce Kizhakoodan on 27 April 2008 at Lourdes Cathedral, Thrissur. In 2019, the couple filed for a mutual divorce petition after 11 years of marriage. She lives in Kochi. Her brother Rinku Tomy is married to actress Muktha George. Rimi married Mumbai-based fitness trainer Libin Mathew on 14 November 2026.

== Discography ==
Following is a partial discography:

Year	Film	Song	Music	Co-singer(s)
2002	Meesa Madhavan	Chingamaasam	Vidyasagar	Shankar Mahadevan
2003	Valathottu Thirinjal Nalamathe Veedu	Pennaayaal	Shakeer	
2003	Pattanathil Sundaran	Kannanaayal	Mohan Sithara	K J yesudas
2004	Freedom	Chandramukhi	Rinil Jones	Pradeep Babu
2004	Udayam	Asaam Kallasamy	Kaithapram	Afsal
2004	Pass Pass	Illibaru	Job Kuruvilla	Sabari K Ayyappan, Sudhi Nambiar
2004	Nammal Thammil	Kabadi Kabadi	M. Jayachandran	Afsal
2004	Chathikkatha Chanthu	Minnaminunge	Alex Paul	Jyotsna Radhakrishnan
2004	Students	Thenkasikkiliye	SP Balasubrahmanyam	M.G. Sreekumar
2005	Kalyana Kurimanam	Mindattam Venda	Ronnie Raphael	Madhu Balakrishnan
	Fast Track			
2005	Udayananu Tharam	Karale Karalinte	Deepak Dev	Vineeth Sreenivasan
2005	Bus Conductor		M. Jayachandran	
2006	Balram vs. Tharadas	Mathapoove	Jassie Gift	
2006	Chakkara Muthu	Kakke Kakke	M. Jayachandran	
2006	Vaasthavam	Ara Pavan	Alex Paul, Rajamani	
2006	Aswaroodan			
2007	Athisayan	Ennomale	Alphonse	Vineeth Sreenivasan
2007	Hareendran Oru Nishkalankan		Berny-Ignatious	
	Abraham Lincoln		M. Jayachandran	
	Tantra			
2007	Chotta Mumbai	Vasco da Gama	Rahul Raj	Vipin Xavier, Nish thathappilly
2007	Chocolate	Kalkanda Malaye, Chocolate	Alex Paul, Saji Ram	
2007	Romeoo			
	Kanalkannadi			
	Thulasi			
2008	Mulla	Aarumukhan, Katteda	Vidyasagar	Tippu, Manicka Vinayagam, Gemon, Reshmi
	Kabaddi Kabaddi			
	Speed			
2008	Twenty:20	Sa Ri Ga Ma Pa	Berny-Ignatius	Dr. K. J. Yesudas, Madhu Balakrishnan, Afsal, Franco, Vineeth Sreenivasan, Jassie Gift, K. S. Chithra, Sujatha Mohan, Jyotsna Radhakrishnan, Rimi Tomy, Anitha
2008	LollyPop		Alex Paul	
2009	Nammal Thammil	"Kabadi Kabadi"	M. Jayachandran	Afsal
2009	2 Harihar Nagar		Alex Paul	
2009	Chemistry		M. Jayachandran	
2009	Vellathooval		Johnson	
2009	Chattambinadu	Chenkatali	Alex Paul	
2009	My Big Father	Mohichille	Alex Paul	M. G. Sreekumar
2010	Elsamma Enna Aankutty	"Kannadi Chirakulla"	Rajamani	Achu Ranjamani
2010	Marykkundoru Kunjaadu	Enttadukke	Berny-Ignatius	Shankar Mahadevan, Pappukutty Bhagavathar, Subhalaxmi
2010	Christian Brothers	Karthaave, Mizhikalil Naanam	Deepak Dev	Shankar Mahadevan, Nikhil Mathew, Ranjith
2010	Oru Naal Varum	Naathoone Naathoone	M. G. Sreekumar	Mohanlal
2010	Body Guard	Enneyano	Ouseppachan	M. G. Sreekumar, Biju Narayanan
2011	Kottarathil Kutty Bhootham	Mayaavi Thennale	Shamej Samad, Samad Priyadarsini	
2011	Koratty Pattanam Railway Gate	Kannu Randum	Gayoz Johnson	Pradeep Palluruthi
2011	Oru Marubhoomikkadha	Manassu Mayakki	M. G. Sreekumar	Sudeep Kumar
2011	Theja Bhai &Family	Punjirikku	Deepak Dev	Benny Dayal
2012	Mayamohini	Avani	Berny-Ignatius	
2012	Mayamohini	Avani	Berny-Ignatius	
2012	Simhasanam	O Mayo	Ronnie Raphael	
2012	Husbands in Goa	Mounam Mazhayude	M.G. Sreekumar	Najim Arshad
2012	My Boss	Kuttanadan Punchaneele	Sejo John	Rahul Nambiar
2013	Sound Thoma	Kanni Penne	Gopi Sundar	Shankar Mahadevan
2013	Maad Dad	Kilukile Chirikana	Alex Paul	Jassie Gift, Pradeep Babu, Ramesh Babu, Vijayaraghavan
2013	Nadodimannan	Macha Enne Marannidalley	Vidyasagar	Jyotsna, Ranjini Jose, Udit Narayan
2014	Angry Babies in Love	Mayatheeram	Bijibal	Nikhil Mathew
2014	Avatharam	Konji Konji	Deepak Dev	Shankar Mahadevan
2014	Mylanchi Monchulla Veedu	Puthanilanjikk	Afsal Yusuf	Anwar Sadat, Yazin Nizar
2014	Rajadhi Raja	Midumidukkan	Berny-Ignatius	Madhu Balakrishnan, Kumari Nandha J Devan
2014	Villali Veeran	Cindrella	S. A. Rajkumar	Karthik
2014	Aamayum Muyalum	Kaanakombile	Priyadarshan	
2014	Swaasam	Kalla Chekka	Kannan Suraj Balan	KG Markose
2015	Kaattumaakkan	Thaalam	Murali Guruvayoor	Hariharan
2015	Rudra Simhasanam	Kanne Kannare Kannave		G.Venugopal
2015	8th March	Akkara Kaavile	M.G. Sreekumar	
2015	John Honai	Onnu Parayille	Alex Paul	Vidhu Prathap
2016	Aadupuliyattam	Chillum Chillum	Ratheesh Vegha	Najim Arshad
2016	Kattappanayile Rithwik Roshan	Parudaya Mariyame	Bijibal	Vaikom Vijayalakshmi
2017	Honey Bee 2:Celebrations	Jillam Jillala	Deepak Dev	Anwar
2017	Honey Bee 2:Celebrations	Kinavano	Deepak Dev	Afzal
2017	Achayans	Kaanaa Chiraku	Ratheesh Vegha	Najim Arshad
2017	Akashamitayee	Kiya Kiya	Manzoor	
2018	Oru Kuprasidha Payyan	Pranayapoo	Ousepachan	Devanand
2018	Yours Lovingly	Vinn Megham	Alex Paul	Franco
2018	Vikatakumaran	Nakshatrangal	Rahul Raj	
2018	Oru Kuttanadan Blog	Mangalyam	Sreenath	Haricharan
2018	Ennalum Sarath	Sasiyane	Ousepachan	Niranj Suresh
2019	Oru Yamandan Premakadha	Kothiyoorum Balyam	Nadirshah	Vineeth Sreenivasan
2019	KaliKootukkar	Mylanchy Chopane	Vinu	Vineeth Sreenivasan
2019	Pathinettam Padi	Hemantha Pournami	Rakesh Brahmanandan	
2019	Childrens Park	Kannam Thumbi	Arun Raj	Vijay Yesudas
2019	March Randam Vyazham	Kili Kili	Anwar	
2020	Varkki	Kalyanam Nale	Francis, Sumesh	Zia Ul Haq
2022	Regina	Evide Mannil	Sathish Nair	

== Filmography ==
=== Television ===
Year	Show	Role	Channel	Notes
1997	Gaanaveedhi: Interview with KP Udayabhanu	Anchor	Doordarshan	
1998-2000	Dum Dum Dum Pi Pi Pi	Anchor	Kairali TV	
2000	Music Live	Anchor	Asianet	
2001-2004	Silver Storm Safari	Anchor	Asianet News	
2006	Star Singer	Co- Host	Asianet	
2006-2007	Rim Jhim	Anchor	Asianet Plus	
2008	Idea Star Singer 2008	Celebrity Singer	Asianet	
2009	Music Live	Anchor	Asianet	
2009-2010	Idea Star Singer Season 4	Team Ambassador	Asianet	
2011	Comedy Stars	Judge	Asianet	
2012	Asianet Film Awards coutdown	Host	Asianet	Special show
2013 -2015	Rhythm	Host	Kairali TV	
2013	Junior idol	Judge	Jaihind TV	
2013	2012 Veruthe alla Bharya Season 2	Host	Mazhavil Manorama	Replacing Shweta Menon
2013 - 2017	Onnum Onnum Moonu	Host	Mazhavil Manorama	
2014	Star Singer Season 7	Anchor & Judge	Asianet	
2014–2020	Comedy Stars Season 2	Judge	Asianet	Won: 2nd Asianet Comedy Awards for Top Television Entertainer of the Year
2015	Mazhavilazhakil Amma : Boeing Boeing	Host	Mazhavil Manorama	Special show
2016	Smart Show 60	Host	Flowers (TV channel)	Replacing Sreekandan Nair
2016 -2018	Onnum Onnum Moonu Season 2	Host	Mazhavil Manorama	
2018	Comedy Stars Plus	Judge	Asianet Plus	
2018 – 2019	Onnum Onnum Moonu Season 3	Host	Mazhavil Manorama	
2019–2020	Comedy Stars Weekend challenge	Judge	Asianet	
2019	Paadam Namuk Paadam	Judge	Mazhavil Manorama	
2019–2020	Onnum Onnum Moonu Season 4	Host	Mazhavil Manorama	
2020	Snehathode Veetil Ninnu	Host	Mazhavil Manorama	
2020 – 2021	Super 4 Season 2	Judge	Mazhavil Manorama	
2020 – present	Rimi Tomy Official	Host	YouTube	YouTube channel
2020	Red Carpet	Mentor	Amrita TV	
2021	Atham Pathu Ruchi	Celebrity Presenter	Mazhavil Manorama	
2021	Comedy Masters	Judge	Amrita TV	
2021	Parayam Nedam	Participant	Amrita TV	
2021–2022,2024	Star Magic	Mentor	Flowers TV	
2021–2022	Super 4 juniors	Judge	Mazhavil Manorama	
2021	Oru Chiri Iru Chiri Bumper Chiri	Celebrity Judge	Mazhavil Manorama	
2021	Thumbapoo	Reemi ( Veena's friend)	Mazhavil Manorama	TV serial
2021	Mazhavil Chiri awards	Host	Mazhavil Manorama	Award show
2021	Anchinodu Inchodinchu	Participant	Surya TV	
2021–2022	Super Power	Mentor	Flowers TV	
2021	Flowers Oru Kodi	Participant	Flowers TV	
2022	Jayettans pooram	Herself	Amrita TV	
2022	Jananayakan	Herself	Amrita TV	
2022	Super Kudumbam	Team Captain	Mazhavil Manorama	replaced by Prayaga Martin
2022	Panam Tharum Padam	Participant	Mazhavil Manorama	
2022- 2023	kidilam	Judge	Mazhavil Manorama	
2023	Rasakadhanayakan Jayaram	Herself	Amrita TV	onam special
2023	Parayam Nedam	Herself	Amrita TV	onam special
2023	Star Singer Season 9	special Judge	Asianet	
2024	Flowers top singer season 4	special Judge	Flowers TV	
2024	Mazhavil Entertainment awards	Host	Mazhavil Manorama	Awards show
2024	Super Star	Judge	Amrita TV	Replaced Sayanora Philip
2024- present	Flowers top singer season 4	Judge	Flowers TV	

=== Films ===
Year	Film	Role	Notes
2006	Balram Vs Tharadas	Herself as singer	Special appearance
2010	Kaaryasthan	Herself as singer	Special appearance
2012	916	Herself as singer	Special appearance
2013	5 Sundarikal (Segment Gauri)	Gauri's friend	
2015	Thinkal Muthal Velli Vare	Pushpavalli	
2015	Kunjiramayanam	Thankamani	Cameo role
2018	Ennalum Sarath..?	Herself	Special appearance

=== Albums ===
Year	Song	Album
2009	Othiri Othiri	6th module
