= S. Balakrishnan (composer) =

Film composer and music director (died 2019)

- Born: 8 November 1948; Chittlancherry, Palakkad, Kerala
- Died: 17 January 2019 (aged 70); Chennai, Tamil Nadu
- Occupation: composer
- Years active: 1989-2012

S. Balakrishnan (8 November 1948 – 17 January 2019) was an Indian film score composer and music director who worked mainly in Malayalam cinema. Best known for his association with the director duo Siddique-Lal, he scored some of the all-time hit songs in the late 1980s and early 1990s.

== Biography ==
S. Balakrishnan was born and brought up in Chittlancherry in Palakkad district. He did a bachelor's degree in Economic History from Coimbatore and later moved to Madras pursuing a career in films. He received Best Student Award in the western classical music test conducted by Trinity College London in 1975.

His musical career began in 1975 as an assistant music director to Guna Singh and to Rajan–Nagendra. He also played the western instrument Recorder and the western flute for eminent music directors such as Ilayaraja.

Under the suggestion of director and producer Fazil, his film scoring career began in late 1980s with Siddique-Lal's comedy film Ramji Rao Speaking (1989). The songs of this film were a notable success, which made Balakrishnan's route easy. Siddique-Lal signed him in all of their future ventures till Vietnam Colony (1992). He did music for 14 films including four with Siddique-Lal. His other notable films include Kilukkampetti (1991), Grihaprevesam (1992), and Ishtamanu Nooru Vattam (1996). After Vietnam Colony, Balakrishnan took a break and did only rerecording for a few films. He made a comeback through East Coast Vijayan's 2011 musical romance film Mohabbath. He served as a faculty for recorder and western flute at KM Music Conservatory, a music institution founded by A. R. Rahman. He died on 17 January 2019 at his home in Chennai, after a long battle with cancer. He was 70 and is survived by his wife Rajalakshmi and two sons - Sreevalsan and Vimal Shankar.

== Filmography ==
- Ramji Rao Speaking (1989)
- In Harihar Nagar (1990)
- Godfather (1991)
- Kilukkampetti (1991)
- MGR Nagaril (1991; Tamil)
- Madhura Nagarilo (1991; Telugu)
- Grihaprevesam (1992)
- Mr. & Mrs. (1992)
- Nakshathrakoodaram (1992)
- Vietnam Colony (1992)
- Mazhavilkoodaram (1995)
- Ishtamanu Nooru Vattam (1996)
- Sneha Saamraajyam (Punnaaram Kuyil) (1999)
- Varavaay (2000)
- Akashathile Paravakal (2001)
- Mayakazhcha (2008)
- Mohabbath (2011)
- Manthrikan (2012)
