= Parda Hai Parda (film) =

- Poster
- Directed by: K. Bapaiah
- Written by: Siddique-Lal
- Produced by: K Venkataraman
- Starring: Chunky Pandey; Meena; Malvika Tiwari; Virendra Singh; Rajendranath Zutshi; Laxmikant Berde; Reema Lagoo; Shobha Khote; Kiran Kumar
- Music by: Anand–Milind
- Release date: 10 July 1992
- Running time: 130 minutes
- Language: Hindi

Parda Hai Parda (transl. There is a Veil) is a 1992 Indian Hindi-language comedy film directed by K. Bapaiah, starring Chunky Pandey, Meena (in her major Bollywood debut), Malvika Tiwari, Virendra Singh, Rajendranath Zutshi, Laxmikant Berde, Reema Lagoo, Shobha Khote and Kiran Kumar. It is a remake of the 1990 Malayalam film In Harihar Nagar, which went on to be remade again in Hindi as Dhol.

== Plot ==
The film revolves around four happy-go-lucky friends and the predicament they face when they cross paths with a new girl in their neighborhood. At the outset, we see a suitcase of some significance being moved through the busy city. The bag is handed off by various men in suits until it reaches an older gentleman. The old man soon is pursued by some hoodlums. He narrowly escapes the thugs by hopping into a cab, only for the driver to stop the car in a secluded area. The mysterious driver then kills the old man dead with a gunshot and steals the bag and is shown running in the distance.

The film then begins to follow four friends in the same city. Vijay, Appu Khote, Prem and Thomas are a carefree bunch with no responsibilities that roam their part of town in search of fun and beautiful women.

The film takes a turn when they hear about a beautiful young woman that has just moved into their neighborhood with her grandparents. They are instantly allured by her good looks and start to make hilarious attempts to find out about her and why she is in town. In their quest to learn about the girl and impress her, they end up accidentally injuring Maya's grandfather and terrorizing her grandmother. They discover that the girl, whose name is Maya is visiting the city to get to the bottom of a mystery surrounding her dead brother, Raghuveer. In town, Maya is able to track down the mother of his brother's friend, Androze. The mother had been anxiously awaiting the return of her son from a long leave of absence and in that time had met Maya's brother Raghuveer, who left a special package for her from her long-lost son. We later find out that this package is the suitcase seen at the beginning of the film.

All four friends after learning about Maya and her reasoning for visiting the town decide to lie and pretend that the four of them were good friends with Maya's brother Raghuveer and Androze. After failed individual attempts to win her over, Maya eventually befriends the foursome. Once this happens, a powerful man by the name of John Honai appears to be stalking the four.

Honai tricks Vijay and his friends into coming to a warehouse, telling them that Maya wanted to meet them there. It is there that Vijay, Appu, Thomas and Prem are cornered by Honai and his gang of henchman. Honai, under the impression that the four are true friends of Androze and Raghuveer, demands that they reveal the whereabouts of the suitcase bag. The four are confused by the interrogation and deny they know anything about this bag. After failing to escape the warehouse, Honai holds the four hostage and subjects them to torture until they give up the whereabouts of the bag.

Meanwhile, Maya tracks down Androze's old girlfriend Annie Phillips, who is now currently a nun in a convent, going by the name Sister Josephine. The nun spills the story that Maya was looking for. The film flashes back to how the Androze family was doing business with the Honai family and after some problems, the two parties had a falling out and there was a fortune that belonged to the Androze father. The Honai family killed Androze father for the fortune, which was kept in a suitcase bag. Androze was able to retrieve the bag by killing John Honai's father. After escaping a gang beating from John Honai and his henchmen, Androze brings the bag to his good friend Raghuveer to take care of and deliver it to his mother. Soon thereafter, Raghuveer finds Androze's dead body at the shore of a beach and vows to get revenge. Raghuveer brings the bag to John Honai and tries to kill Honai, but fails after he's choked to death by Honai's henchmen with a rope as he has Honai in a chokehold. Honai checks the bag only to see that it was a decoy bag full of bricks.

Back to the present, Vijay and his friends cleverly escape the warehouse. Vijay and his friends find out that they are in big trouble as the police are now also after them after being mistaken as thugs. The four fail to retrieve the bag from the Androze's mother once they fess up that they lied about being his friend. Androze's mother scolds them and doesn't give up the bag. Honai finds out where Maya lives and kidnaps her. Vijay, Appu and the gang are able to save her from Honai's grasp in a big fight scene near the end of the movie.

Honai finds out where The Androze's mother lives and tries to retrieve the bag. Honai reveals to Androze's mother that he killed her son, which devastates her. She cuts the lights off in her house and earlier was cooking in the kitchen and had not turned the gas off. Honai scans through the dark house for her and ignites a lighter to try to see in the dark only for an explosion to occur, burning him alive.

With Maya now at peace after getting justice for her brother's death, she now heads back to her own town. The movie ends with the mysterious bag busting open with a fortune of money and gold inside, and Maya yells out to her four friends that this is a gift for them to enjoy.

== Cast ==
- Chunky Pandey as Vijay
- Meena as Maya
- Virendra Singh as Prem
- Rajendranath Zutshi as Thomas
- Laxmikant Berde as Appu Khote
- Kiran Kumar as John Honai
- Pankaj Dheer as Raghuveer
- Reema Lagoo as Androze's mother
- Adi Irani as Androze
- Malvika Tiwari as Sister Josephine/Annie Phillips

== Soundtrack ==
Song	Singer
"Sapna Sundari"	Amit Kumar
"Suno Suno"	Amit Kumar, Sudesh Bhosle
"Shukriya Shukriya"	Amit Kumar, Udit Narayan, Sadhana Sargam
"Awara Galiyon Ke Hum"	Amit Kumar, Udit Narayan, Jolly Mukherjee
"Hey Babu, I Love You"	Kavita Krishnamurthy, Abhijeet
