= MGR Nagaril =

- Theatrical release poster
- Directed by: Alleppey Ashraf
- Written by: Gokula Krishna (dialogues)
- Story by: Siddique–Lal
- Produced by: R. B. Choudary
- Starring: Anand Babu; Sukanya
- Cinematography: Sekar V. Joseph
- Edited by: V. Sekar
- Music by: Sankaraiya. Balakrishnan
- Production company: Super Good Films
- Release date: 12 September 1991
- Running time: 125 minutes
- Country: India
- Language: Tamil

MGR Nagaril (transl. In MGR Nagar) is a 1991 Indian Tamil-language comedy film directed by Alleppey Ashraf, starring Anand Babu and Sukanya, with Vivek, Charle, Supergood Kannan, Pandiyan, Shankar, Napoleon, S. S. Chandran and Sumithra in supporting roles. It is a remake of the 1990 Malayalam film In Harihar Nagar. The film was released on 12 September 1991.

== Plot ==
Four men try to impress a new girl in town. When they find out that she is trying to investigate her brother's murder, they start to pretend to be his friends and soon get into more trouble than they can handle.

== Cast ==
- Anand Babu as Mahadevan
- Sukanya as Shobana
- Vivek as Gopal
- Charle as Anand
- Supergood Kannan as Ravi
- Sreeja as Sr. Josephine/Ruby Philp
- Shankar as Victor
- Pandiyan as Siva
- Napoleon as John Peter
- S. S. Chandran as Shobana's grandfather
- Sumithra as Victor's mother

== Soundtrack ==
The music was composed by S. Balakrishnan.

All lyrics are written by Vairamuthu.

Track listing
No.	Title	Singer(s)	Length
1.	"Machini Oruthi"	S. P. Balasubrahmanyam	4:57
2.	"Singara Paavai Ye"	S. P. Balasubrahmanyam, M. G. Sreekumar	5:13
3.	"Masai Matham"	S. P. Balasubrahmanyam, Swarnalatha	4:47
4.	"Yenage Enthan" (male)	S. P. Balasubrahmanyam	4:59
5.	"Udal Konda"	Mano, K. S. Chithra	4:50
6.	"Yenage Enthan" (female)	P. Susheela	5:12
Total length:			29:58

== Reception ==
Sundarji of Kalki felt the antics of four lead actors are terrible but enjoyable in few places and also added it seems the producer Choudhary nodded the script because of its concept which was similar to the previous films he had produced. He also added that Sukanya and Napolean were wasted and called music a mere decoration.
