= Makalkku =

2005 Indian film

- Directed by: Jayaraj
- Screenplay by: Madampu Kunjukuttan
- Story by: Rajan Poduval
- Produced by: Alex Varghese
- Starring: Suresh Gopi; Shobana
- Cinematography: M. J. Radhakrishnan
- Edited by: Vijayakumar
- Music by: Ramesh Narayan (songs); Alphons Joseph (score)
- Release date: 11 March 2005
- Country: India
- Language: Malayalam

Makalkku (transl. For daughter) is a 2005 Indian Malayalam-language drama film directed by Jayaraj and written by Madampu Kunjukuttan from a story by Rajan Poduval. It stars Suresh Gopi and Shobana. The film features songs composed by Ramesh Narayan and background score by Alphons Joseph.

Singer Adnan Sami performed a song in the film. Shobana's performance as an intellectually disabled woman gained critical acclaim.

== Plot ==
A woman gives birth to a daughter on the streets. Her identity is unknown, and she is non-responsive. Her daughter, Manasi, is raised in a mental asylum and looked after with love by the staff. Manasi's intrusion into the lives of these patients becomes a rain to those dry lives. They eagerly take care of the child with the assistance of other hospital staff.

A girl named Bindu, who was falsely accused of being mad, starts deeply caring for Manasi. Her enchanting lullaby flows around the whole asylum like a settling relief. A few days later, Bindu is asked to leave the asylum for being totally sane. However, she prefers her home at the asylum with her friends, saying that the world outside is totally unknown to her. Dr. Warrier is helpless. Hence, she bids farewell to her dear Manasi and the others at the asylum. Her departure marks a point of deep aching grief to everyone at the hospital. The next day, it is revealed in the newspaper that Bindu has committed suicide.

Manasi grows older winning the hearts of everyone at the hospital. Shortly, a notice from Human Rights Commission arrives, asking the authorities to let go of Manasi's care. Although the chief doctor, Dr. Warrier, wishes to adopt her, it is denied. She is later taken away by the state's social welfare department.

== Cast ==
- Suresh Gopi as Dr. Warrier
- Shobana as Killeri
- Raihana Mariam as Manasi (as Baby Raihana)
- Alex Varghese as Dr. Varghese
- C. P. Rajashekharan as Dr. Panicker
- Ranjith Velayudhan as Dr. Chandran
- Shalu Menon as Bindu
- Valsala Menon as Gayathri
- Vinayakan as Mental Patient
- Nilambur Ayisha as Mental Patient
- Manka Mahesh as Nurse
- Kozhikode Sharada as Nurse
- Poornima Anand as Nurse Sumathi
- Ramakrishnan as Nambeeshan

== Soundtrack ==
The film's soundtrack contains eight songs, all composed by Ramesh Narayan, and the lyrics were written by Kaithapram Damodaran Namboothiri, Rifat Sulthan, and Anil Panachooran. The background score was by Alphonse Joseph.

#	Title	Singer(s)
1	"Chaanchaadiyaadi"	Gayatri Asokan
2	"Chaanchaadiyaadi"	Adnan Sami
3	"Mukilin Makale"	Manjari
4	"Baharon Ko Chaman"	Hariharan
5	"Edavamaasa Perumazha"	Dhanu Jayaraj
6	"Edavamaasa Perumazha"	Balachandran Chullikkad
7	"Paavakali"	Jassie Gift, Madhushree Narayan
8	"Paavakali [Karaoke with Madhuree]"	Madhushree Narayan

== Awards ==
- Kerala State Film Award for Best Singer in 2004 for Manjari for the song Mukilin makalae....
- Kerala State Film Award for Best Makeup Artist in 2004 for Renjith Ambadi
