= King Liar =

- Theatrical release poster
- Directed by: Lal
- Screenplay by: Siddique-Lal
- Dialogues by: Bipin Chandran
- Story by: Siddique
- Produced by: SAK
- Starring: Dileep; Madonna Sebastian; Lal; Asha Sarath; Joy Mathew; Natasha Suri; Shivaji Guruvayoor; Balu Varghese; Balachandran Chullikkad
- Cinematography: Alby
- Edited by: Ratheesh Raj
- Music by: Songs: Alex Paul; Score: Deepak Dev
- Production company: Ousepachan Movie House
- Distributed by: Graand Production
- Release date: 2 April 2016
- Running time: 157 minutes
- Country: India
- Language: Malayalam
- Budget: ₹10.5 crore (US$1.1 million)
- Box office: ₹32 crore (US$3.3 million)

King Liar is a 2016 Indian Malayalam-language romantic comedy film written by Siddique and directed by Lal. It stars Dileep, Lal, Asha Sharath, and Madonna Sebastian in the lead roles. It was produced by SAK under his production SAK Movie House. The soundtrack and score were composed by Alex Paul and Deepak Dev. The film was released on 2 April 2016. The movie is about a manipulative liar, Sathyanarayan. The movie brought the writer-director duo Siddique-Lal together after 22 years.

== Plot ==
Sathyanarayan is a manipulative conman who lies to his lover, Anjali, claiming that he is the managing director of a major firm under the alias Narendran, or Naran. In reality, he makes duplicate certificates with the help of his roommate and close friend, Antappan. Their lives take an unexpected turn when Anand Varma, a wealthy Dubai-based fashion tycoon, enters the picture. Anand is on the verge of divorcing his wife, Devika Varma. Although Anand and Devika were deeply in love, their relationship falls apart after Anand kisses a model at one of his success parties. Devika witnesses the incident and decides to end their marriage.

Meanwhile, Sathyan discovers that Anjali is actually his childhood friend. Desperate to save his marriage, Anand hires Sathyan to convince Devika to reconsider the divorce. Sathyan and Antappan travel to Dubai and join the company, which is now owned by Devika. Initially, Devika is furious and throws Sathyan out of the company. However, circumstances eventually force her to allow him to join. Impressed by Sathyan's clever business tactics and ability to handle difficult situations, Devika eventually promotes him to the position of Assistant Manager.

As Devika was planning to appoint someone representing her in the Asian Beauty Contest, Sathyan persuades Anand to pick Anjali as his model. Devika finally finds Natasha as her representative, but Sathyan persuades Natasha to reunite Anand and Devika. In the end, Anjali wins the competition after explaining the consequences of being divorced in the Intelligence round, and Anand and Devika reunite. Anjali, after the competition, visits Sathyan who says his real name is Sathyan to her. Sathyan confesses that Anjali is his childhood friend, and they both reunite.

At last Rahul, who is revealed to be the son of Sathyan and Anjali was caught telling lies about his dad being MS Dhoni to his friends. He tells his friends Sathyan is their driver. The film ends with Sathyan chasing Rahul and telling him to stop lying.

== Cast ==
- Dileep as P. Sathyanarayanan (Sathyan) / Narendran (Naran)
  - Nebish Benson as Young Sathyan
- Madonna Sebastian as Anjali, Sathyan's childhood sweetheart turned wife
- Lal as Anand Varma, Owner of Varma Designs
- Asha Sarath as Devika Varma, Anand's wife
- Joy Mathew as Pothuval Maash, Anjali's father
- Balu Varghese as Antappan
- Hareesh Perumanna as Pushpa Kumar (Pushpu)
- Natasha Suri as Natasha
- Chali Pala as Kalidasan
- Moideen Koya as Prasad
- Balachandran Chullikkad as Paraparambil Narayanan Nair, Sathyan's father
- Shivaji Guruvayoor as Gopi Sir
- Ansar Kalabhavan as Omega Consultancy Manager
- Punnapara Prashanth as Shanthan, Village Drunkard
- K.T.S. Padannayil as Aarsha Bharatha Samskaram Editor (Cameo)
- Bipin Chandran as Announcer
- Samarth Ambujakshan as Magician John
- Kavya Madhavan as Model (Photo Presence Only)
- Binu Adimali as Sudheesh, Police Officer
- Vijayan Peringod as Villager
- Vijay Menon as Minister Thomas Chennikkadan
- Amith Chakalakkal as Host
- Nahas Hidayath as Hotel Supplier
- Rithu Manthra as Model

== Music ==
1. "Annadyamaay"
2. "Dinamithu Kaathirunnere (Anjali)", singer: Arjun Muralidharan
3. "Hello Hello Check Hello", singer: Vipin Lal
4. "Perum Nunappuzha", singer: Manjari, Vijay Yesudas
5. "Title Song"

== Production ==
Principal photography commenced at Kochi on 21 October 2015. The film was shot in Kuttanad, Dubai, and Kochi.

== Release ==
King Liar was released on 2 April 2016 in 127 screens in Kerala.

== Reception ==
=== Box office ===
The film collected ₹1.52 crore (US$160,000) on its opening day and ₹5.32 crore within its first four days at the Kerala box office. Making a share of ₹2.35 crore in 4 days. It collected ₹96 lakh in the fifth day, making it ₹6.28 crore and ₹8.56 crore gross collection in 8 days, thus making a share amount of ₹4.05 crore. The film grossed ₹12.73 crores after 15 days and continued in 80 screens in its third week. The film collected ₹15 crore (US$1.6 million) in a month from the Kerala box office. The film collected ₹18.72 crore (US$1.9 million) within 41 days from the Kerala box office alone. The film collected ₹20.18 crore (US$2.1 million) from Kerala box office in 58 days.
