= 2 Harihar Nagar =

- Promotional poster
- Directed by: Lal
- Written by: Lal
- Produced by: P. N. Venugopal
- Starring: Mukesh; Siddique; Jagadish; Ashokan
- Cinematography: Venu
- Edited by: V. Sajan
- Music by: Alex Paul
- Production companies: P. N. V Associates; Lal Creations
- Distributed by: Lal Releases (India); PJ Entertainments (Europe)
- Release date: 1 April 2009
- Running time: 142 minutes
- Country: India
- Language: Malayalam
- Budget: ₹4 crore

2 Harihar Nagar is a 2009 Indian Malayalam-language comedy thriller film written and directed by Lal and produced by P. N. Venugopal starring Mukesh, Siddique, Jagadish and Ashokan. It is the sequel to In Harihar Nagar (1990). The film chronicles the story of four childhood friends Mahadevan, Govindan Kutty, Appukuttan and Thomas Kutty who revisits their home residence Harihar Nagar after many years to relive their old days. However, problems arise after they meet a girl and when one of them goes missing.

The film was a box office success. A sequel, In Ghost House Inn was released in 2010.

== Plot ==
The movie starts with a flashback, in front of a church, in 1980 when the four main characters were children. This scene shows the beginning of their friendship. Thomas Philip alias Thomas Kutty loses money to a scam artist, who responds to his complaints with violence. He is rescued by other three friends Mahadevan, Govindan Kutty and Appukuttan who respond to his calls of distress. They invite Thomas Kutty to join their group who, above all, vow never to cheat on one another. The scene is transitioned by the quote "Thomas Kutty Vittodaa!" (Thomas kutty, run!) once the scam artist brings his friends to return the beating he got.

The movie transitions to the current time: each of them are introduced again, 20 years later. Mahadevan is a Dubai based businessman and a part-time personality development trainer who is married to Sulochana and they have daughter Meenakshi, but their family life is not successful. Govindan Kutty is a leading builder who's happily married Parvathi and settled in Bangalore. Appukuttan is a famous dentist, living in Mumbai who often troubles his wife Janaki and twin sons Manu and Vinu.

The prologue show them preparing to travel back to Harihar Nagar to attend Thomas Kutty's wedding. After many years of "enjoying" his bachelor life, Thomas Kutty has decided to settle down and marry an orphan Jaseentha who belonged to the same church as him. The prologue also highlights that none of them have really changed from their flirtatious ways, despite being married. After arriving at Harihar Nagar, they settle into Govindan Kutty's old house. Disappointed at how life has become sombre after growing up and being focused with their family, Mahadevan suggests that they should revert to their younger selves and live their old life how they lived in Harihar Nagar. To jump start their "trip back to youthfulness", they creates a problem in a hotel and escapes.

While staying at Govindan Kutty's house, they are greeted with flowers left at the doorstep with a tag reading "Maya". Immediately thinking that this is their old Maya, they go to meet her in a café. They barely miss her, but Appukuttan throws a rock and breaks her car's rear window. An anonymous woman steps out of the car, who is revealed to be another Maya, which gets them arrested. Later, Maya comes and gets them out of bail saying that they are her friends and didn't recognise it because she hadn't seen them in a long time. Once out, she says not to bother her any more because of this. Maya lives right across from Govindan Kutty's house. Trying to find the weakness that will draw her attention, that night Appukuttan looks to the window and is frightened by the sight of a ghostly figure with a "burned" face. Thomas Kutty is not staying with the other three on that night as he went to invite few peoples for his wedding, but he arrives the next morning. Mahadevan says a sentimental story to make Maya believe that they're not here for wrong reasons. She later comes and visits them and becomes their friend.

It is revealed that Maya is John Honai's daughter Cristina, in cahoots with her evil brother Freddy. Thomas Kutty gets kidnapped days before his wedding and his three friends are suspected. They are followed by the police. Meanwhile, Freddy has Thomas Kutty. The trio gets kidnapped by Freddy's henchmen and they find Thomas Kutty in the place. Freddy demands the box filled with money which their old Maya had given them. Mahadevan tells Freddy that they will give the box when the original owner comes in front of them. Freddy takes them to a room where a face covered man with his wheelchair by halfly burned face is sitting. Appukkuttan remembers the face that he had seen earlier at Maya's house. Freddy reveals it is the person the foursome knows as Honai. The box is now in a bank with each of the foursome knowing two digits of the password. The four friends escape, but Appukuttan is captured. Maya is found and chided, but she tells her story full of dire circumstances. Mahadevan, Govindan Kutty and Thomas Kutty decides to retrieve the box from the bank and give it to Freddy to save Appukuttan, but the correct code for the box sounds faulty.

After a lot of twists and turns they confront Freddy who has a time bomb attached to his pet Lousie, a clinging lizard on Appukuttan. During the fight between the 4 friends, Freddy and his henchmen, the bomb comically gets caught over each person, except Mahadevan. Finally, The time bomb gets caught on Thomas Kutty while Freddy presses the ignition to burst in 30 seconds. Thomas Kutty runs to Freddy in the last few seconds and pushes Freddy into the next room. The bomb explodes killing them both, leaving the 3 friends shattered. But later, a twist occurs showing that Thomas Kutty is alive and was betraying them. The three friends realises this and they beats him up in and leaves him at the same church where they started their friendship. Thomas Kutty realises his mistake and confess that everything was a plan he made to get the money to pay a debt he had while gambling. He apologises for everything he did and they all reconcile at his wedding and becomes best friends again.

== Cast ==
- Mukesh as V.S. Mahadevan
- Siddique as Govindan Kutty
  - Harimurali as Young Govindan Kutty
- Jagadish as Dr. Appukuttan Nair (K Haridas)
- Ashokan as Thomas Philip (Thomas Kutty)
- Vineeth as Shyam Sundar (guest appearance)
- Lakshmi Rai as Serina, (fake names) Maya, Christina Honai
- Rohini as Sulochana, Mahadevan's wife
- Lena as Parvathi, Govindan Kutty's wife
- Reena Basheer as Janaki, Appukuttan's wife
- Rakhi Raveendran as Jaseentha (Jessy), Thomas Kutty's fiancée turned wife
- Sudipto Balav as Freddy Honai (voice over by Anoop Chandran)
- Appa Haja as SI Cherian
- Janardhanan as Fr. Stephen Varghese
- Kochu Preman as Chandy, Thomaskutty's uncle
- Salim Kumar as Ayyappan
- Narayanankutty as Rajappan
- Chali Pala as Hotel Manager Vishwanathan Kurup
- Pradeep Kottayam as Hotel Bearer
- Kunchan as Advocate Surendran
- Kalabhavan Rahman as Constable Rajan
- Cherthala Lalitha as Mother Superior
- Revathy Sivakumar as Meenakshi, Mahadevan's daughter
- Rizabawa as John Honai (Photo and Archieve footage)
- Thrissur Elsy as Mahadevan's mother (guest appearance)
- Atlas Ramachandran as himself (guest appearance)
- N. L. Balakrishnan as Air Passenger (guest appearance)
- Geetha Vijayan as Maya (Special appearance)
- Rekha as Sister Josephine/Annie Philip (Special appearance)
- Kaviyoor Ponnamma as Andrew's mother (special appearance)
- Sonu Satheesh Kumar as Receptionist

== Soundtrack ==
The film's soundtrack contains 3 songs, all composed by Alex Paul and the lyrics were by Bichu Thirumala. The two songs Unnam Marannu and Ekantha Chandrika were remixed and used from In Harihar Nagar, the prequel of this film.

#	Title	Singer(s)
1	"Unnam Marannu"	Vineeth Sreenivasan, Ramesh Babu
2	"Ekantha Chandrika"	M. G. Sreekumar, Madhu Balakrishnan, Afsal, Biju, Anitha
3	"Adavukal Pathinettum"	M. G. Sreekumar, Afsal, Anitha, Cochin Ibrahim, Rimi Tomy, Sangeetha Prabhu, Vidhu Prathap

== Sequel ==
In Ghost House Inn was released in 2010.

=== Box office ===
The film was released in 130 screens all over Kerala and had a successful opening, owing to the cult following of its prequel. The film was highly successful which ran over 100 days in theatres, and was one of the highest grossing Malayalam film of the year. The satellite rights of the film was sold for an amount of ₹13 crore.

The film was a commercial success. The film grossed ₹18 crore in 3 days in Kerala box office. It grossed over ₹20 crore at the box office.

=== Critical reception ===
The film mostly opened to high positive reviews from the critics.

Sify wrote "2 Harihar Nagar is just what intelligent filmmaking is all about and, no wonder, this delightful comedy is a winner from the word go". Rediff wrote: "The main reason 2 Harihar Nagar works is because the performance of the foursome that Lal is able to extract, giving us a sense of deja vu" and gave it 3 stars out of 5. Indiaglitz wrote: "To Harihar Nagar definitely offers rib tickling comedy and delightful watch from the word goes, with apt mixing up of inexhaustible laughter and few moods of seriousness at intervals".
