= Duplicate (2009 film) =

- DVD cover
- Directed by: Shibu Prabhakar
- Written by: Shani Khader
- Produced by: Sajai Sebastian & Joji K.John
- Starring: Suraj Venjaramood; Innocent; Bheeman Raghu
- Cinematography: Shamdat Sainudeen
- Music by: Alex Paul
- Distributed by: Zion International Film Factory
- Release date: 18 September 2009; (India)
- Country: India
- Language: Malayalam

Duplicate is a 2009 Malayalam-language comedy drama film directed by Shibu Prabhakar and produced by Sajai Sebastian and Joji K. John under the banner of Zion International Film Factory with Suraj Venjaramoodu in the lead role. This is Suraj's first movie as a hero and he plays a double role in the movie. The film received mixed to negative reviews but highly positive reception from the public mainly due to the comedy and performance of the lead actors.

== Premise ==
Shivan Kutty is a jobless village lad, who finds it difficult to pay back his increasing debts. He is in love with his cousin Meenakshi, though his uncle Keshavan doesn't quite approve her relation with a good for nothing guy. Added to his routine of mayhem are two professional killers Ronnie and Bruno, who runs after him due to a misunderstanding. But life turns to colourful patches when Sivan Kutty gets mistaken as Jeevan, a look alike wealthy businessman, following a car accident. Sivan Kutty is taken into the wealthy house of Jeevan where he lives in luxury and Jeevan is mistaken as Sivan Kutty and is taken into Sivan Kutty's house. Later, it was revealed that the car accident was well planned. The rest of the plot revolves around Sivan Kutty helping the SP Antony Rosarrio, Jeevan's friend to bring under law the killers who are after Jeevan. In the end, Sivan Kutty marries Meenakshi and clears all his debts, with Jeevan's help.

== Cast ==
- Suraj Venjaramoodu in a dual role as:
  - Sivankutty
  - Jeevan Raj
- Innocent as P. Suresh, Sivankutty's uncle & aide
- Lalu Alex as Pattalam Keshavan, Sivankutty's uncle
- Bheeman Raghu as Blade Dasappan
- Riyaz Khan as SP Antony Rosarrio IPS
- Roopashree as Meenakshi, Sivankutty's cousin & lover
- Mythili Roy as Ranjini, Jeevan's cousin & lover
- Riza Bava as Mahendran Thampi, Ranjani's father & Maya's brother
- Urmila Unni as Maya, Jeevan's stepmother, Vijay's mother
- Maniyanpilla Raju as Sivankutty's brother-in-law
- Reshmi Boban as Sivankutty's sister
- Rony David as Vijay, Jeevan's step brother
- Ambika Mohan as Sivankutty's mother
- Anoop Chandran as Nakulan, Jeevan's manager
- Salim Kumar as Professional Killer Ronnie (PKR)
- Bijukuttan as Professional Killer Bruno
- Kalabhavan Shajohn as Mykattu Moos
- Machan Varghese as Susheelan
- Bindu Murali
