= Dr. Pasupathy =

- Poster
- Directed by: Shaji Kailas
- Written by: Renji Panicker
- Produced by: V. C. George
- Starring: Innocent; Rizabawa; Parvathy; Nedumudi Venu; Jagathy Sreekumar; Kuthiravattom Pappu; Jagadish; KPAC Lalitha; Kalpana
- Narrated by: M. G. Soman
- Cinematography: Santosh Sivan
- Music by: Johnson Master
- Production company: Saga Films
- Release date: 4 May 1990
- Country: India
- Language: Malayalam

Dr. Pasupathy is a 1990 Indian Malayalam-language comedy drama film directed by Shaji Kailas, written by Renji Panicker. The film stars Innocent in the title role along with, Rizabawa, Parvathy, Nedumudi Venu, Jagathy Sreekumar, Kuthiravattom Pappu, Jagadish, KPAC Lalitha, Kalpana in supporting roles. The film follows Bhairavan, a con artist who is hired by the Panchayat leader of a small village to pose as a veterinary doctor.

This film was produced and distributed by V. C. George under the banner of Saga Films, in his second production venture after the 1989 cult classic Dasharatham. The film features original songs composed by Johnson. The cinematography was done by Watson D'Cruz. M. G. Soman appeared in a cameo role as the narrator of the film. The film marked the onscreen debut of actor Rizabawa.

The film was released on 4 May 1990 and was a box office success. The film is noted for being directed by Kailas, who later became known for his political thrillers. The film is written by Renji Panicker, who went on to collaborate with Kailas in many films. The character UDC Kumari played by Kalpana is considered one of the best comedy characters in Malayalam cinema and eventually developed a cult following several years after the release of the film.

== Plot ==
The film introduces us to a small village and its funny characters. The narrator informs of its developments and day-to-day activities. Soon, it slowly focus to the problems discussed in the Panchayat office (fights do occur between two factions in a comical way), in which the main problem is the absence of a veterinary doctor. The leaders of the opposition faction, Nanappan and Uthpalakshan, gives a final ultimatum to the Panchayat president Unnikannan Nair to resign his post if he can't find a vet within days.

Unnikannan Nair's daughter Ammukutty falls love with Pappen. However Unnikannan Nair disapproves due to the rivalry of Pappen's friends for The Panchayat President – Nanappan, Uthpalakshan and 'Society' Balan. Also the animosity between Pappan's Grandfather and Kunjulakshmi, Unnikannan Nair's mother adds fun to the tale. The romantic angle includes 'Society' Balan's romance with U. D. C. Kumari who is also followed by Balan's father and Unnikannan Nair's associate Parameswara Kurup.

While Parameswara Kurup travels to find a vet he encounters an old friend and thief, Bhairavan and encourages him to act. Thus Bhairavan is introduced in the village in his new avatar, Dr. Pasupathy. Unnikannan Nair soon takes a liking to him and arranges Ammukutty's marriage. Heartbroken, Pappen soon leaves the village for work and finds solace and shelter from a friend who is Police Circle Inspector.

Soon when Dr. Pasupathy's 'uncle', his associate in fact Velayudhan Kutty, enters the village to see Bhairavan and joins his scam, it's up to Pappen's friends to call back Pappen to save Ammukutty.

== Cast ==
- Innocent as Bhairavan /Doctor Pashupati
- Rizabawa as Pappan
- Parvathy as Ammukkutty
- Nedumudi Venu as Unnikannan Nair
- Paravoor Bharathan as Kurup
- Jagathy Sreekumar as Nanappan
- Kuthiravattam Pappu as Ulpalakshan
- Jagadish as Society Balan
- Thikkurisi Sukumaran Nair
- Kalpana as UDC Kumari
- Meena Joseph as Usha
- K.P.A.C. Lalitha as Unnikkannan Nair's wife
- Philomina as Unnikkannan Nair's mother/Muthassi
- Mammukoya as Velayudhan
- Vijayaraghavan as Police Officer
- NL Balakrishnan as Police Constable Govindan Nair
- Krishnankutty Nair as Police Constable Nanu Nair
- Sainuddin as Tea Shop Owner
- Kunchan

== Themes and influences ==
This film's main character has failed to achieved masculinity as dictated by societal standards.

== Soundtrack ==
The film features music by Johnson Master. Rajamani, who composed music for Kailas' News (1989), was present for the recording and re-rerecording for this film and Sunday 7 PM (1990).

- "Kanakam Mannil" – M. G. Sreekumar, Sujatha Mohan

== Legacy ==
The film is well known for its comedic track involving Kalpana's character UDC Kumari. Alphonse Puthren listed this film as one among his fifty favorite Malayalam films.
