= In Ghost House Inn =

- Directed by: Lal
- Written by: Lal
- Produced by: P. N. Venugopal
- Starring: Mukesh; Siddique; Jagadish; Ashokan
- Cinematography: Venu
- Edited by: V. Sajan
- Music by: Alex Paul
- Production companies: P. N. V Associates; Lal Creations
- Distributed by: Lal Releases (India)
- Release date: 25 March 2010
- Running time: 136 minutes
- Country: India
- Language: Malayalam
- Budget: ₹2.5 crore
- Box office: ₹8 crore

In Ghost House Inn is a 2010 Indian Malayalam-language horror comedy film written, directed, and co-produced by Lal. Starring Mukesh, Siddique, Jagadish and Ashokan, the film is a sequel to 2 Harihar Nagar (2009) and In Harihar Nagar (1990). In the film, Thomas Kutty buys a haunted bungalow with the intent of converting it to a resort and convinces his friends to stay with him. The trouble begins when they actually see the ghost of the mistress who was killed seventy years ago.

It was produced by P. N. Venugopal under the banner of PNV Associates. The film was a box office success.

== Plot ==
Seventy years ago, within the eerie confines of Dorothy Bungalow, a sinister act unfolded. Dorothy, consumed by vengeance, mercilessly murdered her husband, Fernandez, and his mistress, Grace. With cold precision, she placed their lifeless bodies into a blood-drenched trunk before eliminating her unsuspecting driver. Disposing of both the trunk and the driver's corpse into the depths of a well hidden within the lower right chamber of the house, she vanished, leaving the mansion shrouded in an air of malevolence.

In the present day, Thomas Kutty, having come into considerable wealth through his exploits in 2 Harihar Nagar, acquires the seemingly forsaken bungalow nestled in the misty hills of Ooty, envisioning its transformation into a lavish resort. However, the property bears a sinister reputation—whispers of a spectral presence, the tormented soul of the mistress slain decades prior, pervade the region. Dismissing such tales as mere superstition, Thomas Kutty orchestrates an elaborate ruse to deceive his closest confidants, Mahadevan, Govindan Kutty and Appukuttan, demonstrating that fear is but a product of human imagination. Unveiling his deception—where hired individuals played the role of ghosts—he convinces his skeptical friends to join him in the mansion, along with their wives, though Mahadevan, Govindan Kutty and Appukuttan refuses.

En route to their destination, they encounter Father Dominic, a cryptic figure who ominously warns them of impending doom should they persist in their endeavor. Unmoved by his prophecy, they proceed, only to be met with an unsettling omen—the mansion's housekeepers abruptly abandon their posts, citing the undeniable presence of supernatural entities. At this juncture, Thomas Kutty confesses to a grave falsehood: contrary to his earlier claims, he had never resided in the bungalow alone before purchasing it. This revelation sends a shiver of unease through the group, as apprehension for their safety, as well as that of their spouses, takes hold.

A succession of unsettling occurrences compels them to seek the aid of Father Dominic, who agrees to intervene. However, their trust is tested when he discloses that he is unaffiliated with any church, instead pursuing a path devoted to paranormal research. As Mahadevan and Govindan Kutty prepare to leave, Dominic cryptically forewarns of a forthcoming calamity involving fire. His prophecy is chillingly realized when Thomas Kutty's wife, Jessy, is nearly consumed by flames—only to be rescued in the nick of time by Dr. Christopher, a supposed ally of Father Dominic.

Despite Dominic's previous admonition to abstain from indulgence in alcohol, meat, and revelry, the group disregards his words, triggering an ominous turn of events. The maidservant, Marathagam, becomes possessed by an enigmatic force, her demeanor morphing into something grotesque and unrecognizable. As Father Dominic endeavors to expel the entity, he suffers a fatal heart attack, rendering all hopes of salvation seemingly lost. With fear gripping their hearts, Thomas Kutty hastily relinquishes the bungalow, selling it at a diminished price to Dorothy.

However, as they embark on their return journey, Mahadevan receives an unsettling phone call from Father Dominic, who astonishingly declares that he staged his own demise. With chilling clarity, he unveils a web of deceit—Dr. Christopher was his clandestine accomplice, and Marathagam, a mere pawn in his elaborate charade. Yet, what he fails to anticipate is the friends’ own foresight. Mahadevan, recalling a minute discrepancy—Dominic had erroneously bandaged his right hand instead of his left—had deduced his duplicity early on. Similarly, Appukuttan, having checked Dominic's pulse at the time of his supposed death, had known he was alive and had cunningly ensured his demise. Govindan Kutty, realizing that Dominic had masqueraded as Dorothy to facilitate the fraudulent sale, had outmaneuvered him by bribing the registrar with an even greater sum. Finally, Thomas Kutty triumphantly reveals that not only do they retain ownership of the property, but they have also regained every rupee paid to Dominic.

Elated by their victory, the friends jubilantly return to Dorothy Bungalow, ready to reclaim what is rightfully theirs. Yet, as they step inside, an ominous force asserts its presence—the gates slam shut of their own accord, sending an undeniable message. The mansion, steeped in the horrors of its past, still harbors a presence unseen, an entity far more terrifying than the depictions of mere men.

== Cast ==
- Mukesh as Mahadevan
- Siddique as Govindankutty
- Jagadish as Dr. Appukuttan Nair (K Haridas)
- Ashokan as Thomas Philip (Thomaskutty)
- Nedumudi Venu as Father Dominic
- Karishma Kotak as Dorothy Fernandez
- Radhika in a dual role as:
  - Marathakam
  - Marathakam's twin sister
- Rohini as Sulochana, Mahadevan's wife
- Lena as Parvathy, Govindankutty's wife
- Reena Basheer as Janaki, Appukuttan's wife
- Rakhi Raveendran as Jaseentha (Jessy), Thomas Kutty's wife
- Thampi Antony as Doctor Christopher
- Rajesh Hebbar as Sekhar
- Harisree Ashokan as Earnest, Tea shop owner
- Majeed as Georgekutty
- Kochu Preman as Chandy, Thomaskutty's uncle
- Anoop Chandran as the driver of Dorothy Fernandez
- Kalabhavan Shajon as Impala driver
- Pala Aravindan as Registrar
- V.P. Ramachandran as Manager
- Vinod A.G. as Lakshmikanthan
- Aravindan as Registrar
- Raai Laxmi as Serina, in a special appearance in the song "Ola Ola"
- Appa Haja as SI Cheriyan (special appearance)

== Production ==
Shooting for the film began in early October 2009. It was scripted and directed by Lal, who also wrote and directed the film's predecessors.

== Soundtrack ==
The film's soundtrack contains 6 songs, all composed by Alex Paul. Lyrics were by Bichu Thirumala, Anitha and Muthu Vijayam.

#	Title	Singer(s)
1	"Oh Rambho"	M. G. Sreekumar, Vidhu Prathap, Ramesh Babu, Vipin Xavier
2	"Ole Ole"	Anitha, Jassie Gift
3	"Theekaayum Thaanthonni"	M. G. Sreekumar, Rimi Tomy
4	"Viyya Miyya"	Anitha
5	"When I Am With You"	Anitha, Biju Peter
6	"Adavukal"	M. G. Sreekumar, Afsal, Anitha, Cochin Ibrahim, Rimi Tomy, Sangeetha Prabhu, Vidhu Prathap, Sajini Anand, Sangeetha, Sruthi Raj

== Release ==
=== Box office ===
In Ghost House Inn was a commercial success at the box office. Made on a budget of ₹2.5 crore, it grossed ₹8 crore from the box office.

=== Critical reception ===
Rediff.com gave it 2 out of 5 stars, saying: "There's nothing new about In Ghost House Inn... this third instalment comes without much of a story line compared to the earlier films". Sify wrote: "In Ghost House Inn manages to entertain the viewers to some extent". Indiaglitz wrote; "All in all In Ghost House Inn may find it little harder than its prequels to satisfy the ever demanding fans of the fantastic four". Similarly, Oneindia.com and Nowrunning.com gave average reviews to the film and gave it 2 out of 5 stars. But Zonekerala.com gave the film 4 out of 5 stars: "The film has aptly made use of the resources available and is constructed at a modest budget. This movie is a must see for your family this season".
