= Kangaroo (2007 film) =

2007 film directed by Raj Babu

- Directed by: Raj Babu
- Screenplay by: J. Pallassery
- Story by: Anil Raj
- Produced by: Cicily Biju Kaipparedan
- Starring: Prithviraj Sukumaran; Jayasurya; Kavya Madhavan; Lalu Alex; Jagathi Sreekumar
- Cinematography: Saloo George
- Edited by: V. Sajan
- Music by: Alex Paul; Saji Ram
- Production company: Isabellah Movie Tone
- Distributed by: Lal Release
- Release date: 21 December 2007
- Country: India
- Language: Malayalam

Kangaroo is a 2007 Indian Malayalam-language action comedy film directed by Raj Babu, starring Prithviraj Sukumaran, Jayasurya, and Kavya Madhavan. The screenplay was written by J. Pallassery based on a story by Anil Raj. This film was an average hit in 2007.

== Plot ==
Josekutty is a hard-working Knanaya Christian auto rickshaw driver from a good family. He falls in love with Jancy whose sister, Nancy, is an unwed mother of a baby boy. Josekutty is asked to see Nancy for an arranged marriage. He mistakenly thinks that Jancy is Nancy, and he agrees to the marriage. Josekutty agrees to marry her. Nancy is found dead on the day before the wedding. Josekutty raises her child as his son and tries to find out who is the father of the child. He learns that Monachan, who was the son of the majordomo in Nancy's family, was in love with her and had earlier killed her boyfriend, who was the father of her child. He also accidentally killed Nancy. While trying to kill Josekutty and the child, Monachan is stabbed to death by Josekutty's brother Mathukutty, thereby saving Josekutty and the child. Josekutty and Jancy make up and decide to take care of the child as their own.

== Cast ==
- Prithviraj Sukumaran as Joseph Abraham (Josekutty)
- Jayasurya as Mekkalattu Monachan(Main Antagonist)
- Kavya Madhavan as Mekkalattu Jancy, Stephen's sister and Josekutty's love interest
- Oviya as Susanna Abraham (Susakutty), Josekutty's and Mathukutty's younger sister
- Kaveri as Mekkalattu Nancy, Jancy's sister
- Joe Francy as Jithumon, Nancy's baby son
- Lalu Alex as Mekkalattu Stephen, Jancy's and Nancy's elder brother and Josekutty's brother- law
- Harisree Asokan as Pappikunju, Josekutty's friend
- Jagathy Sreekumar as Mathew Abraham (Mathukutty), Josekutty's elder brother
- Salim Kumar as 'Current' Kunjachan, Josekutty's, Susanna's and Maathukutty's brother-law
- Suraj Venjaramood as Ilanjikal Babychan
- Indrans as Chellappan, Josekutty's friend
- Bindu Panicker as Annakutty, Mathukutty's, Josekutty's and Sussana's sister
- Kalaranjini as Cicily, Stephen's wife
- Sukumari as, Mary, Josekutty's, Susanna's and Mathukutty's Mother
- K. P. A. C. Lalitha as, Mariyamma, Stephen, Jancy and Nancy's mother
- Sreejith Ravi as 'Syringe' Vasu
- Santhakumari as Janamma
- T. P. Madhavan as Paul K. Mani
- Kalabhavan Prajod as Manmadhan, Josekutty's friend
- Dora Jose as Thulasi

== Soundtrack ==
Saji Ram composed the soundtrack of "Kangaroo". Alex Paul composed the background score and the song, "mazhamani mukile". The lyrics were written by Biju kaipparedan and Vayalar Sarath Chandra Varma for the song, "mazhamani mukile".

1. Aararirariraro - K. J. Yesudas

2. Marthoma Nanmayal - Afsal, Cicily, Anwar Sadat

3. Autokkaran Josoottikku - M. G. Sreekumar, Afsal, Anwar Sadat

4. Mazha Manimukile - Rimi Tomy, Vidhu Prathap

5. Oru Kana Kanavin - Vineeth Sreenivasan

6. Manathe Kanavinte - Anwar Sadat, Hannah

7. Aararirariraro - Ranjini Josh

== Production ==
The film was initially discussed with Jayasurya in the lead role. For the film, he had to opt-out of a role in the Mohanlal-starrer Chotta Mumbai due to scheduling conflicts as per the original plan. However, the project got delayed as it progressed and Jayasurya got interested in the role of Monichan and took that part with Prithviraj Sukumaran replacing him in the lead role.

== Release ==
The film was released on 21 December 2007.
