= Vidhu Prathap =

Indian singer

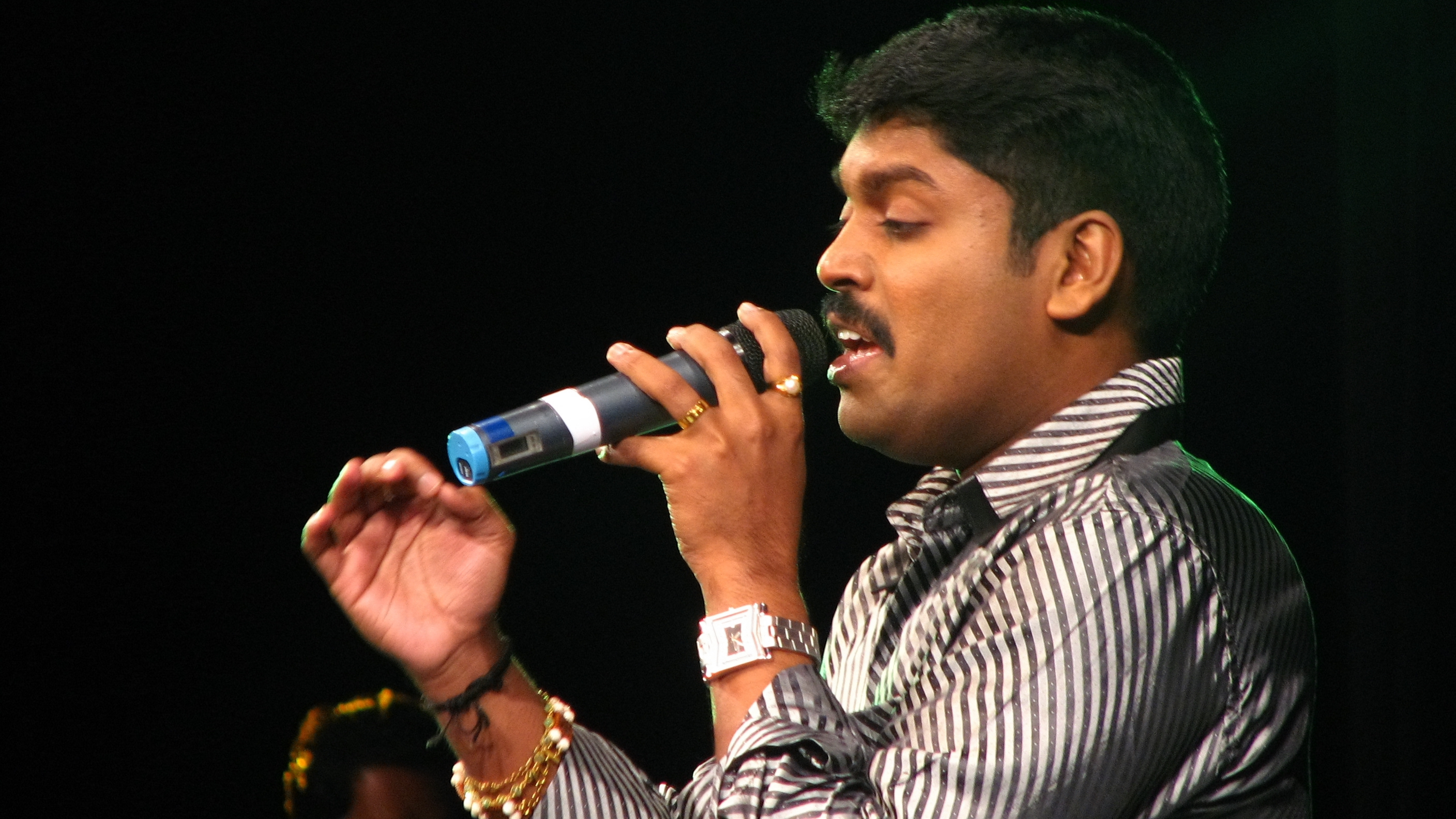
- Vidhu Prathap in a show

Background information
- Born: Vidhu Prathap; 1 September 1980 (age 45); Thiruvananthapuram, Kerala, India
- Origin: Thiruvananthapuram; Mar Ivanios College
- Genres: Malayalam
- Occupations: Playback singer
- Years active: 1999–present

Vidhu Prathap (born September 1, 1980) is an Indian playback singer. Renowned for his voice, he has lent his vocals to over 100 film songs, predominantly in Malayalam cinema, as well as in Tamil, Kannada, and Telugu films. With numerous hit songs in several landmark movies, Vidhu Prathap has become a staple in major Malayalam music shows, performing both in India and internationally.

== Career ==
=== Early life ===
Vidhu Prathap was born in 1980 in Kaithamukku in Thiruvananthapuram, Kerala, as the son of Prathapan and Laila. He received his early education from Holy Angel's Convent Thiruvananthapuram and then completed his schooling at Christ Nagar School, Thiruvananthapuram. Vidhu was the college union Arts Club Secretary at Mar Ivanios college, Thiruvananthapuram, where he graduated. In 1997–98, at 17, he won the 'Voice of the Year Award' in a music competition conducted by the television channel Asianet.

=== Playback singing ===
Prathap first sang in a movie called Paadamudra, when he was in class IV. However, his breakthrough role was in 1999 in the movie Devadasi.

He performed Shukriya Shukriya in Niram (1999). He also performed in the movie Sayahnam, directed by R. Sarath, which won 'Vidhu' the Kerala State Film Award for Best Singer in 2000 for the song Kaalame Kaikolluka Nee. His rendition of Mohan Sithara's Sukhamani Nilaavu from the movie Nammal won him the 2002 Asianet Best Male playback singer award. He trained with the music director G. Devarajan for four years. He has also trained under composer Perumbavoor G. Raveendranath.

Ilaiyaraaja introduced him to the 'Tamil film industry' in the movie Solla Marandha Kadhai (2002). Later, he sang many Tamil songs, and some became hits. In 2003, he recorded a hit song Vaaleduthal Ankakali from Meesa Madhavan. He also sang a song for the Malayalam musical album Chempakame, with the song Melemaanathu. Some movies that featured songs by him are 'Meesa Madhavan', 'Nammal', 'Swapnakoodu','Sundari Sundari (from kanninum kannadikkum), 'Valakilukkam Kettedee (from Meesa Madhavan), 'Pattalam', 'Runway', 'Pandippada', 'Ravanan', 'Vargam', 'Out of Syllabus', 'Chathikkatha Chanthu', 'Thanmathra', 'Vasthavam', 'Kadha', 'Kangaroo (2007 film)', 'In Ghost House Inn', 'Lollipop', 'Kerala Varma Pazhassi Raja', 'Oru Naal Varum', 'Violin', and '180'. He has sung the most songs for music director Alex Paul. He has sung in over 600 films and recorded numerous music albums. Vidhu is also an active performer in stage shows.

He has worked with composers G.Devarajan Master, Illayaraja, Keeravani, Raveendran Master, Vidyasagar, Ousepachan, Mohan Sithara, Sharreth, M Jayachandran and Alex Paul during his career. He has sung in Malayalam, Tamil, Telugu, and Kannada.

=== Other works ===
Prathap has also acted in multiple shows, starring in a serial directed by the musician-lyricist-director Sreekumaran Thampi. It is called 'Paattukalude Paattu', and the story revolves around a struggling but upcoming stage singer. He has hosted shows like Idea Star Singer 2006 and Surya Challenge. He has judged Top Singer on Flowers TV and was a judge of Super 4 (Indian TV series) on Mazhavil Manorama.

Currently, he is a judge of Star Singer season 9.

== Personal life ==
He married Deepthi Prasad, a TV anchor and a professional classical dancer, on 20 August 2008 in Thiruvananthapuram.

== Awards ==
Prathap has earned several awards, most notably the first Asianet Voice of the Year Award (1997), Kerala State Film Award for Best Singer for the song 'Kaalame Kaikolluka Nee' from Sayahnam (2001), Asianet Best Male Singer Award for 'Sukhamani Nilaavu' from Nammal (2002), Sathyan Foundations Award, GMMA Award, Krystal Symphony TV Young Achiever's Award, and a Film Critics Award (2012).

== Filmography ==
Year	Title	Role	Notes
2025	Oru Jaathi Jaathakam	Himself (cameo)	

== TV shows ==
Year	Title	Role	Channel	Notes
2006	Idea Star Singer (season 1)	Host	Asianet	
2009	Idea Star Singer (season 4)	Team captain	Asianet	
2011	Paatukalude Paattu	Vinayan	Surya TV	Acting debut
2015	Surya Challenge	Host	Surya TV	
2019	Top singer	Judge	Flowers TV	
2020–2021	Super 4 Season 2	Judge	Mazhavil Manorama	
	Kilivaathil	Singer	DD Malayalam	
2021–2022	Super 4 Kids	Judge	Mazhavil Manorama	
2022	Super Kudumbam	Team Captain	Mazhavil Manorama	
2023–2024	Star Singer (season 9)	Judge	Asianet	
2025–present	Star Singer (season 10)	Judge	Asianet	
