= Siddique–Lal =

Indian screenwriter/director duo

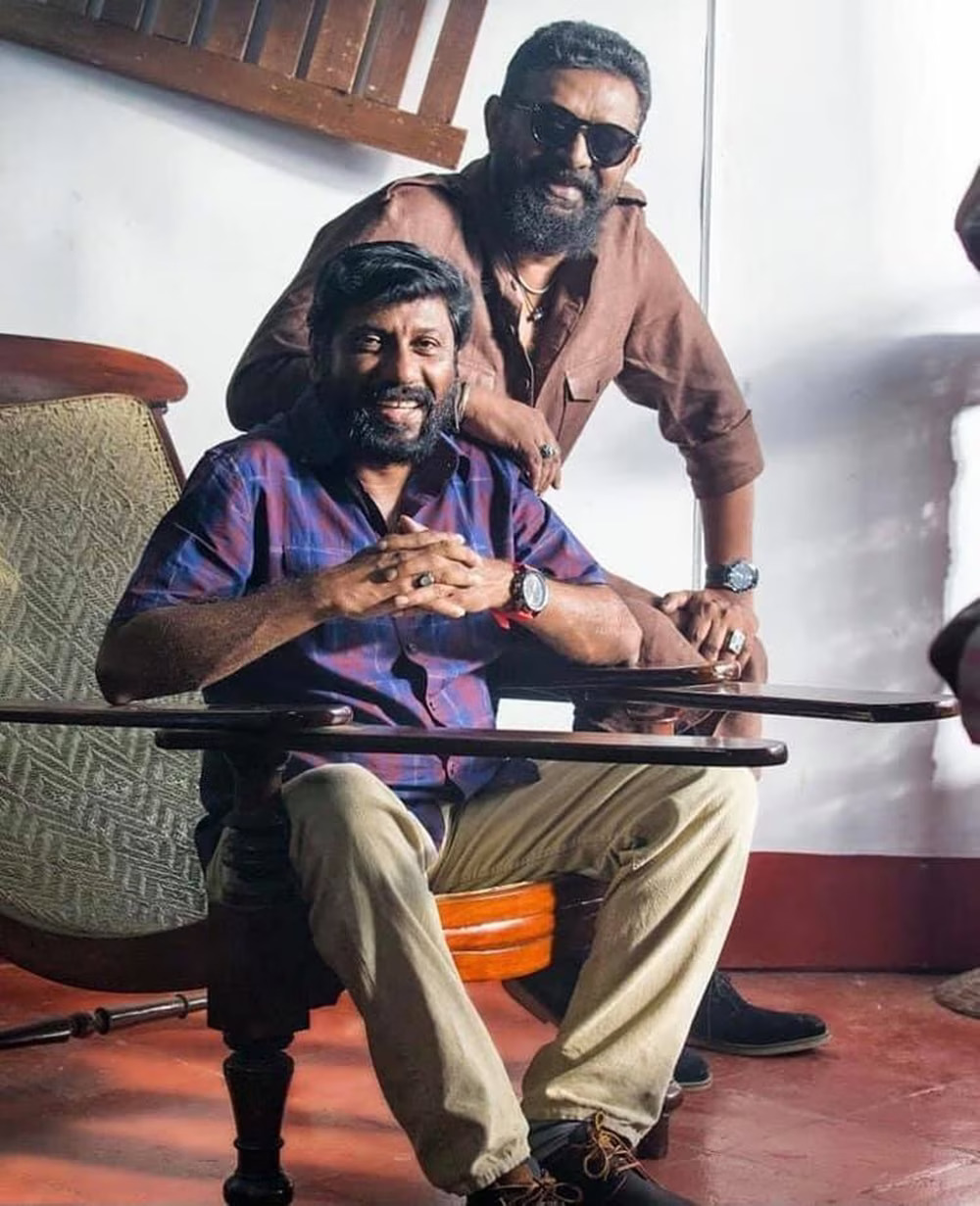
- Siddique (down) and Lal (up), together formed the pair.
- Occupations: Film directors Scriptwriters
- Years active: 1986–1993; 2016

Siddique–Lal were a screenwriter and director duo, consisting of Siddique and Lal. They were active together in Malayalam cinema during 1986–1995. They were initially assistant directors to director Fazil. Particularly known for making films in the comedy genre, the films that came out of the partnership include Ramji Rao Speaking (1989), In Harihar Nagar (1990), Godfather (1991), Vietnam Colony (1992), and Kabooliwala (1993). All of these films were some of the biggest hits in Malayalam cinema and many of them have a cult following in Kerala. The duo broke off in 1993, but later continued their association by Lal producing some of the films directed by Siddique. The duo reunited again after two decades in 2016 to co-write the film King Liar which was directed by Lal.

After the breakup in 1993, Siddique continued his career as a director while Lal turned into acting, later began producing the films he acted in, and then established himself as a notable actor, producer and distributor in Malayalam film.

Siddique later directed Hitler (1996) and Friends (1999) for Lal's production house Lal Creations. After sixteen years, Lal came back as a director by directing the sequels to In Harihar Nagar, 2 Harihar Nagar (2009), and In Ghost House Inn (2010).

Siddique died on 8 August 2023.

== Filmography ==
Directors and writers

- Ramji Rao Speaking (1989)
- In Harihar Nagar (1990)
- Godfather (1991)
- Vietnam Colony (1992)
- Kabooliwala (1993)

Story

- Pappan Priyappetta Pappan (1986)^{[A]}
- Nadodikkattu (1987) (story)
- Makkal Mahatmyam (1993) (story)
- Mannar Mathai Speaking (1995)^{[B]}
- Ayal Kadha Ezhuthukayanu (1998) (Siddique only)
- Hulchul (2004)
- King Liar (2016)^{[D]} (Story Siddique alone)

Screenplay and dialogue

- Mannar Mathai Speaking (1995)^{[B]}
- Finger Print (2005)^{[B]}
- King Liar (2016)^{[D]} (Siddique–Lal)

Director and producer

- Hitler (1996) (directed by Siddique and produced by Lal)
- Friends (1999) (directed by Siddique and produced by Lal)

== Notes ==
- A As screenwriters only.
- B Credited as writers only, but the credits for director went to producer Mani C Kappan.
- C Siddique wrote and directed for Lal's production house Lal Creations.
- D Lal directed under Siddiquelal's script.
- E Siddique wrote and directed.
