= Alex Paul =

Indian composer

- Born: 21 November 1961 (age 64)
- Origin: Kerala, India
- Occupations: Film composer, music director
- Instruments: Playback singing, harmonium
- Years active: 2002–present

Alex Paul is an Indian music director who works in Malayalam cinema. He has composed music for fifty films.

== Personal life ==
Alex is the son of M. A. Paul, a music artist who formed the first orchestra (in Malayalam: 'ganamela') troupe in Kochi & Philomina. He is the younger brother of Lal, of the directing duo Siddique-Lal, and it was in Lal's film Chathikkatha Chanthu (2004) that Alex debuted as musical director.

== Career ==
He learnt musical instruments from Kalabhavan, Kochi. He started his own studio, where he composed music for several music albums and for TV serials. Alex made his film debut as music director with Rafi Mecartin's Chathikkatha Chanthu. At the age of 20, he started a music institute named, Tune of Hearts. When he was 29, he started a recording studio. On 14 October 2013, he started music technology institute, National Institute of Music Technology (NIMT).

He made his acting debut with Alappuzha Gymkhana (2025).

== Discography ==
- Chathikkatha Chanthu (2004)
- Black (2004)
- Rajamanikyam (2005)
- Inspector Garud (2006)
- Kichamani MBA (2007)
- Ali Bhai (2007)
- Hello (2007)
- Mayavi (2007)
- Thommanum Makkalum (2005)
- Vaasthavam (2006)
- Thuruppu Gulan (2006)
- Achanurangatha Veedu (2006)
- Tantra (2006)
- Red Salute (2006)
- Pothan Vava (2006)
- Classmates (2006)
- Baba Kalyani(2006)
- Chocolate (2007)
- Thalappavu (2008)
- LollyPop (2008)
- Kangaroo (2007)
- Panthaya Kozhi (2007)
- 2 Harihar Nagar (2009)
- Duplicate (2009)
- Chattambinadu (2009)
- In Ghost House Inn (2010)
- Tournament – Play & Replay (2010)
- Kalla Malla Sulla (Kannada-2011)
- Seniors (2011)
- Cobra (2012)
- Maad Dad (2013)
- Kandharvan (Tamil-2014)
- John Honai (2015)
- King Liar (2016)
