= Afsal =

Indian film singer in Malayalam cinema

- Born: 14 April 1974 (age 52); Kochi, Kerala, India
- Genres: Playback singing, Carnatic music
- Occupation: Singer
- Instrument: Vocals
- Years active: 2000–present
- Label: Audiotracs

Afsal Ismail is an Indian film singer in Malayalam cinema. His first film song was "Kannilambum Villum" for the movie Valyettan in 2000. He has sung more than 250 movie songs. His popular songs include "Kai thudi thalam", "En Karalil Raakshasi", "Ishtamalleda Enikkishtamalleda", "Shaaba Shaaba", Meharuba, chirimanimulle, "Penne en penne, manassilayiram, veluveluthorupennu and jillam jillala

== Discography ==
Following is a partial discography:

Year	Film	Song
2000	Valyettan	Kannilambum Villum
2001	Sundara Purushan	Konchedi konchum ...
2001	House Owner	Koodilloru Koo Koo Pakshi ...
2001	The Campus	Plus Two Kazhinjappol ...
2002	Kalyanaraman	Kai thudi thalam ...
2002	Nammal	Raakshasi [En Karalil] ...
2002	Jagathy Jagadeesh in Town	Idiminnalaay Kodi Paratheedam ...
2003	Swapnakkoodu	Ishtamalleda Enikkishtamalleda ...
2003	Pattanathil Sundaran	Mullappoovin motte ...
2003	Pulival Kalyanam	Thevaaratheruvu ...
2003	Pulival Kalyanam	Aarundiniyaarundu ...
2003	Valathottu Thirinjal Nalamathe Veedu	Pennaayaal ...
2003	Valathottu Thirinjal Nalamathe Veedu	Kotta Kothalam ...
2003	Swantham Maalavika	Chirikku Chirikku Midukki ...
2004	Swarna Medal	Thillaana Thillana ...
2004	Students	Internetil ...
2004	Students	Laisa laisa...
2004	Vismayathumbathu	Etho Kaliyarangin [Nayika Nee] ...
2004	Mayilattam	Maattupetti koyilile ...
2004	Nammal Thammil	Kabadi Kabadi ...
2004	Perumazhakkalam	Meharuba Mehruba...
2004	Chathikkatha Chanthu	Hosaina Hosaina ...
2004	Vajram	Priyathama ...
2004	Runway	Shaaba Shaaba ...
2004	Thudakkam	Kochiyilum kandilla ...
2004	Natturajavu	Hey Raaja Ney Raaja ...
2004	Monalisa	Oh priyathame ...
2005	Pandippada	Panchayathile.., Mele mukilin.., Mayilin..
2005	Rappakal	Pokaathe kariyila kaatte...
2005	The Campus	Jayam Nammalude...
2005	Thommanum Makkalum	Karppaka Malare..
2007	Chotta Mumbai	Vasco Da Gama..
2007	Inspector Garud	Kanthari Penne...
2007	Kangaroo	Kakkiyittoru autokaran...
2010	Kaaryasthan	Thenikkappuram..
2014	Ithu Manthramo Thanthramo Kuthanthramo	Tiltle Song
2014	Karuman Kasappan	Laletta Laletta ...
2014	Mayamohini	Harahara Shambho ...
2014	Sringaravelan	Ashakushale Pennundo ...
2015	Ivan Maryadaraman	Ezhazhakulla ...
2015	Bhaskar the Rascal	Manassil Aayiram ...
2016	Two Countries	Veluveluthoru pennu...
2017	Fukri	Onnichalle..

== Television Shows as Judge ==
- Mylanchy (Asianet)
- Pathinalam Raavu ( Media One)
- Flowers Top Singer (Flowers TV)
- Paadam Namukku Paadam (Mazhavil Manorama)
