= Gopi Sundar discography =

Gopi Sundar C. S. known mononymously as Gopi Sundar, made his music debut in 2006, with the Malayalam film Notebook. During the course of almost two decades in his career, he has composed original scores and songs for more than 100 films in various languages, predominantly in Malayalam in addition to Telugu and Tamil. He began his career composing music for television commercials, and is credited with writing nearly 5,000 jingles. In 2017, his work in the film Pulimurugan was included in the contender list for the 90th Academy Awards nominations for Best Original Song and Best Original Score categories, but none were nominated.

== Soundtracks ==
Year	Title	Language	Songs	Score	Notes
2006	Notebook	Malayalam	No	Yes	Film Debut
2007	Big B	Malayalam	No	Yes	
2007	Dhol	Hindi	No	Yes	Hindi Debut
2007	Mission 90 Days	Malayalam	No	Yes	
2007	Flash	Malayalam	Yes	Yes	
2008	Poi Solla Porom	Tamil	No	Yes	Tamil Debut; Score only
2009	Sagar Alias Jacky Reloaded	Malayalam	Yes	Yes	
2009	Evidam Swargamanu	Malayalam	No	Yes	
2010	Thanthonni	Malayalam	No	Yes	
2010	Mummy & Me	Malayalam	No	Yes	
2010	Anwar	Malayalam	Yes	Yes	Filmfare Award for Best Music Director
2011	Race	Malayalam	No	Yes	
2011	The Train	Malayalam	No	Yes	
2011	Seniors	Malayalam	No	Yes	
2011	Doctor Love	Malayalam	No	Yes	
2012	Casanovva	Malayalam	Yes	Yes	
2012	Ee Adutha Kalathu	Malayalam	Yes	Yes	
2012	Masters	Malayalam	Yes	Yes	
2012	Mallu Singh	Malayalam	No	Yes	
2012	Hero	Malayalam	Yes	Yes	
2012	Ustad Hotel	Malayalam	Yes	Yes	Asianet Film Awards for Best Music Director; Pearl Awards for Best Background Score; Nominated-SIIMA Award for Best Music Director; Nominated-Filmfare Award for Best Music Director
2012	Yaaruda Mahesh	Tamil	Yes	Yes	
2012	My Boss	Malayalam	No	Yes	
2012	Matinee	Malayalam	No	Yes	
2013	Nee Ko Njaa Cha	Malayalam	No	Yes	
2013	Kammath & Kammath	Malayalam	No	Yes	
2013	Nandanam	Tamil	Yes	Yes	unreleased film
2013	Black Butterfly	Malayalam	No	Yes	
2013	Breaking News Live	Malayalam	No	Yes	
2013	10:30 am Local Call	Malayalam	Yes	Yes	
2013	Sound Thoma	Malayalam	Yes	Yes	
2013	SIM	Malayalam	Yes	Yes	
2013	Mumbai Police	Malayalam	Yes	Yes	
2013	Left Right Left	Malayalam	Yes	Yes	
2013	ABCD	Malayalam	Yes	Yes	
2013	5 Sundarikal	Malayalam	Yes	Yes	
2013	Buddy	Malayalam	No	Yes	
2013	Arikil Oraal	Malayalam	Yes	Yes	
2013	D Company	Malayalam	Yes	Yes	
2013	Vishudhan	Malayalam	Yes	Yes	
2013	Escape from Uganda	Malayalam	Yes	Yes	
2014	Salala Mobiles	Malayalam	Yes	Yes	
2014	1983	Malayalam	Yes	Yes	National Film Award for Best Background Score
2014	London Bridge	Malayalam	No	Yes	
2014	Happy Journey	Malayalam	Yes	Yes	
2014	Polytechnic	Malayalam	Yes	Yes	
2014	Ring Master	Malayalam	Yes	Yes	
2014	1 by Two	Malayalam	Yes	Yes	
2014	To Noora with Love	Malayalam	No	Yes	
2014	God's Own Country	Malayalam	Yes	Yes	
2014	The Last Supper	Malayalam	Yes	Yes	
2014	Mr. Fraud	Malayalam	Yes	Yes	
2014	How Old Are You	Malayalam	Yes	Yes	
2014	Bangalore Days	Malayalam	Yes	Yes	Filmfare Award for Best Music Director; Asianet Film Awards for Best Music Director; Vanitha Film Awards for Best Music Director
2014	Koothara	Malayalam	Yes	Yes	
2014	Naku Penda Naku Taka	Malayalam	Yes	Yes	
2014	Manglish	Malayalam	Yes	Yes	
2014	Rajadhi Raja	Malayalam	No	Yes	
2014	100 Degree Celsius	Malayalam	Yes	Yes	
2014	The Dolphins	Malayalam	No	Yes	
2014	Seconds	Malayalam	Yes	Yes	
2014	Cousins	Malayalam	No	Yes	
2014	Unnimoolam	Malayalam	Yes	Yes	
2015	Mili	Malayalam	Yes	Yes	
2015	Malli Malli Idi Rani Roju	Telugu	Yes	Yes	Telugu Debut; Nominated-Filmfare Award for Best Music Director
2015	Saradhi	Malayalam	Yes	Yes	
2015	Namasthe Bali	Malayalam	Yes	Yes	
2015	Ivan Maryadaraman	Malayalam	Yes	Yes	
2015	Oru Second Class Yathra	Malayalam	Yes	Yes	
2015	Lailaa O Lailaa	Malayalam	Yes	Yes	
2015	Ivide	Malayalam	Yes	Yes	
2015	Jamna Pyari	Malayalam	Yes	Yes	
2015	Urumbukal Urangarilla	Malayalam	Yes	Yes	
2015	Bhale Bhale Magadivoy	Telugu	Yes	Yes	
2015	Ennu Ninte Moideen	Malayalam	Yes	Yes	One song (Mukkathe Penne)
2015	Charlie	Malayalam	Yes	Yes	
2015	Two Countries	Malayalam	Yes	Yes	
2016	Paavada	Malayalam	No	Yes	
2016	Bangalore Naatkal	Tamil	Yes	Yes	
2016	Puthiya Niyamam	Malayalam	Yes	Yes	
2016	Anjala	Tamil	Yes	Yes	
2016	Oopiri; Thozha	Telugu; Tamil	Yes	Yes	
2016	Kali	Malayalam	Yes	Yes	Nominated-Filmfare Award for Best Music Director
2016	Ennul Aayiram	Tamil	Yes	Yes	
2016	James & Alice	Malayalam	Yes	Yes	
2016	School Bus	Malayalam	Yes	Yes	
2016	Shajahanum Pareekuttiyum	Malayalam	Yes	Yes	
2016	Dooram	Malayalam	No	Yes	
2016	Seethamma Andalu Ramayya Sitralu	Telugu	Yes	Yes	
2016	Majnu	Telugu	Yes	Yes	
2016	Brahmotsavam	Telugu	No	Yes	
2016	Pulimurugan	Malayalam	Yes	Yes	90th Academy Awards: Longlisted–Academy Award for Best Original Song; Longlisted–Academy Award for Best Original Score
2016	Premam	Telugu	Yes	Yes	
2016	Abhinetri; Devi; Tutak Tutak Tutiya	Telugu; Tamil; Hindi	No	Yes	Trilingual film; Score only
2016	Swarna Kaduva	Malayalam	No	Yes	
2016	Marupadi	Malayalam	No	Yes	
2017	Fukri	Malayalam	No	Yes	
2017	Oru Mexican Aparatha	Malayalam	No	Yes	
2017	Take Off	Malayalam	Yes	Yes	One Song (Muhabathin)
2017	The Great Father	Malayalam	Yes	No	
2017	Georgettan's Pooram	Malayalam	Yes	Yes	
2017	1971: Beyond Borders	Malayalam	No	Yes	
2017	Comrade in America	Malayalam	Yes	Yes	
2017	Sathya	Malayalam	Yes	Yes	
2017	Achayans	Malayalam	No	Yes	
2017	Ma Chu Ka	Malayalam	Yes	Yes	
2017	Tiyaan	Malayalam	Yes	Yes	
2017	Role Models	Malayalam	Yes	Yes	
2017	Team 5	Malayalam	Yes	Yes	
2017	Ninnu Kori	Telugu	Yes	Yes	
2017	Chunkzz	Malayalam	Yes	Yes	
2017	Adam Joan	Malayalam	No	Yes	
2017	Pullikkaran Staraa	Malayalam	No	Yes	
2017	Pokkiri Simon	Malayalam	Yes	Yes	
2017	Udaharanam Sujatha	Malayalam	Yes	Yes	
2017	Ramaleela	Malayalam	Yes	Yes	
2017	Lavakusha	Malayalam	Yes	Yes	
2017	Goodalochana	Malayalam	No	Yes	One song (Koyikode)
2017	2 Countries	Telugu	Yes	Yes	
2017	Vimaanam	Malayalam	Yes	Yes	
2018	Diwanjimoola Grand Prix	Malayalam	Yes	Yes	
2018	Sketch	Tamil	Yes	No	co-composed soundtrack with S. Thaman
2018	Captain	Malayalam	Yes	Yes	
2018	Kammara Sambhavam	Malayalam	Yes	Yes	
2018	Professor Dinkan	Malayalam	Yes	Yes	
2018	Randuper	Malayalam	No	Yes	
2018	Kondassa	Malayalam	No	Yes	
2018	Kayamkulam Kochunni	Malayalam	Yes	Yes	
2018	Abrahaminte Santhathikal	Malayalam	Yes	Yes	
2018	Raju Gadu	Telugu	Yes	Yes	
2018	Jamba Lakidi Pamba	Telugu	Yes	Yes	
2018	Tej I Love You	Telugu	Yes	Yes	
2018	Pantham	Telugu	Yes	Yes	
2018	Geetha Govindham	Telugu	Yes	Yes	
2018	Sailaja Reddy Alludu	Telugu	Yes	Yes	
2018	Amala	Malayalam	Yes	Yes	One song (Oruthi)
2018	Dakini	Malayalam	No	Yes	
2018	Premasootram	Malayalam	Yes	Yes	
2018	Ente Ummante Peru	Malayalam	Yes	Yes	
2019	Mikhael	Malayalam	Yes	Yes	
2019	Irupathiyonnaam Noottaandu	Malayalam	Yes	Yes	
2019	Kodathi Samaksham Balan Vakeel	Malayalam	Yes	Yes	
2019	An International Local Story	Malayalam	Yes	No	One Song (Athmavil Peyyum)
2019	Argentina Fans Kaattoorkadavu	Malayalam	Yes	Yes	
2019	Majili	Telugu	Yes	No	
2019	Madhura Raja	Malayalam	Yes	Yes	
2019	Uyare	Malayalam	Yes	Yes	
2019	The Gambler	Malayalam	No	Yes	
2019	Mask	Malayalam	Yes	Yes	
2019	Margamkali	Malayalam	Yes	Yes	
2019	Isakkinte Ithihasam	Malayalam	Yes	Yes	
2019	Jack & Daniel	Malayalam	Yes	Yes	One Song (Evide Thirayum)
2019	Happy Sardar	Malayalam	Yes	Yes	
2019	Ulta	Malayalam	Yes	Yes	
2019	Prathi Poovankozhi	Malayalam	Yes	Yes	
2020	Shylock	Malayalam	Yes	Yes	
2020	Entha Manchivaadavuraa	Telugu	Yes	Yes	
2020	Joshua	Malayalam	Yes	Yes	
2020	Choosi Choodangaane	Telugu	Yes	Yes	
2020	World Famous Lover	Telugu	Yes	Yes	
2020	Nishabdham	Telugu	Yes	No	
2021	Tuck Jagadish	Telugu	No	Yes	
2021	Most Eligible Bachelor	Telugu	Yes	Yes	
2021	Anubhavinchu Raja	Telugu	Yes	Yes	
2021	Velan	Tamil	Yes	Yes	
2021	Love FM	Malayalam	No	Yes	
2021	Thalli Pogathey	Tamil	Yes	Yes	
2021	Roy	Malayalam	No	Yes	
2022	Bhoothakaalam	Malayalam	No	Yes	
2022	Thattukada Muthal Semitheri Vare	Malayalam	No	Yes	
2022	Boyfriend for Hire	Telugu	Yes	Yes	
2022	18 Pages	Telugu	Yes	Yes	
2022	Vijayanand	Kannada	Yes	Yes	Kannada Debut
2022	Ullasam	Malayalam	Yes	Yes	
2022	Theerppu	Malayalam	No	Yes	
2022	Nalaam Mura	Malayalam	No	Yes	
2022	Nitham Oru Vaanam	Tamil	Yes	No	
2023	Butta Bomma	Telugu	Yes	Yes	
2023	Geetha Sakshiga	Telugu	Yes	Yes	
2023	Manu Charitra	Telugu	Yes	Yes	
2023	Samajavaragamana	Telugu	Yes	Yes	
2023	Em Chesthunnav	Telugu	Yes	Yes	
2023	Samara	Malayalam	No	Yes	
2023	Maharani	Malayalam	No	Yes	
2024	Kadakan	Malayalam	Yes	Yes	
2024	The Family Star	Telugu	Yes	Yes	
2024	Aa Okkati Adakku	Telugu	Yes	Yes	
2024	Sabari	Telugu	Yes	Yes	
2024	Dhoom Dhaam	Telugu	Yes	Yes	
2024	Thundu	Malayalam	Yes	Yes	
2024	Perumani	Malayalam	Yes	Yes	
2024	Purushothamudu	Telugu	Yes	Yes	
2024	Jithender Reddy	Telugu	Yes	Yes	
2025	Am Ah	Malayalam	Yes	Yes	
2025	Vishnu Priya	Kannada	Yes	Yes	
2025	Khajuraho Dreams	Malayalam	Yes	Yes	
2025	Bha Bha Ba	Malayalam	No	Yes	
2026	Koodothram	Malayalam	Yes	Yes	
2026	Derby	Malayalam	Yes	Yes	
2026	Dose	Malayalam	Yes	Yes	
2026	Aroopi	Malayalam	Yes		
2026	Udumbanchola Vision	Malayalam	Yes	Yes	
2026	Pathira Kurukkan †	Malayalam	Yes	Yes	
TBA	Koragajja †	Kannada	Yes		

== As playback singer ==
Year	Film	Song	Language	Composer	Co-singer(s)
1998	Sundarakilladi	"Bhoomi Prapanchangale"	Malayalam	Ouseppachan	K. S. Chithra
2002	Kaiyethum Doorath	Assalassalaay	Malayalam	Ouseppachan	M. G. Sreekumar, Biju Narayanan, Franco
2009	Sagar Alias Jacky Reloaded	Theme Song	Malayalam		
2010	Anwar	"Kavitha Pol"	Malayalam		A. V. Uma
2012	Ee Adutha Kalathu	"Naatil Veetil"	Malayalam		Anna Katharina Valayil
2012	Hero	"Nero Nero"	Malayalam		
2012	Ustad Hotel	"Sanchari Nee"	Malayalam		
2013	ABCD	"Parayathe"	Malayalam		
2013	Left Right Left	"Akale Angakale"	Malayalam		
2013	Chennai Express	"Titli"	Hindi	Vishal–Shekhar	Chinmayi
2014	Salala Mobiles	"Rasoolallah"	Malayalam		Divya S. Menon, Mohammed Maqbool Mansoor
2014	Unnimoolam	"Pushpaanjali"	Malayalam		
2015	Mili	"Engengo Engengo"	Malayalam		
2015	Mili	"Kanmaniye"	Malayalam		
2015	Mili	"Mili Mili Mili"	Malayalam		
2017	Hadiyya	"Pala Desham"	Malayalam	Sharreth	
2017	Ramaleela	"Nenjileri Theeye"	Malayalam		Harish Sivaramakrishnan
2018	Geetha Govindam	"Kannurepala Kaalam"	Telugu		
