= Arunlal Ramachandran =

Indian screenwriter

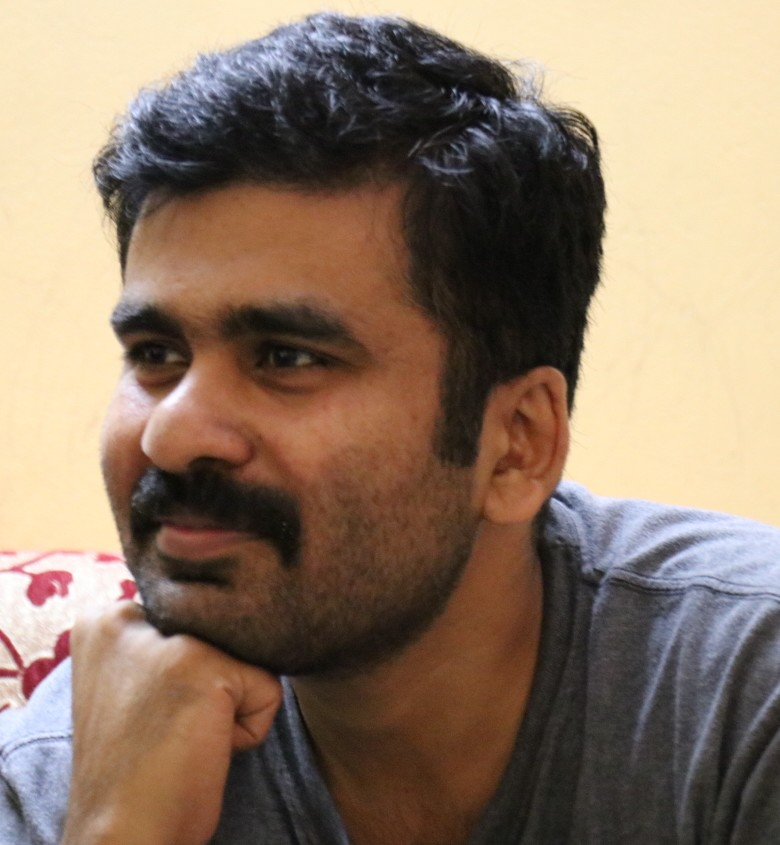
- Born: 14 January 1983 (age 43); Trivandrum, Kerala
- Education: Mar Ivanios College Trivandrum; Govt.College, Kariavattom; Trivandrum Press Club
- Occupations: Screenwriter, Journalist
- Years active: 2009–present
- Spouse: Dhanya.P
- Children: 1

Arunlal Ramachandran (born 14 January 1983) is an Indian screenwriter working in Malayalam cinema. His films include Vettah and Karinkunnam 6's.

== Personal life and education ==
Arunlal completed his secondary education from Mannam Memorial Residential Higher Secondary School. He completed his pre-degree course from Mar Ivanios College and graduated in Govt. College, Kariavattom. He also completed a Post-Graduate Diploma in journalism (PGDJ) in Institute of Journalism at the Press Club, Thiruvananthapuram.

He is married to Dhanya and they have one child.

== Career ==
Arunlal started career as a journalist. Being a student in Thiruvananthapuram Press Club, he started a news portal. For his news portal he interviewed John Brittas, who later appointed him in Kairali TV, where he hosted chat shows with ministers of Kerala state and celebrities from Malayalam film industry.

Later he resigned from Kairali and joined as assistant director in the Mohanlal film Red Chillies, directed by Shaji Kailas.

Arunlal scripted 10:30 am Local Call(2013) and later scripted, Thank You (2013), Happy Journey (2014), Vettah (2016), and Karinkunnam 6's (2016).

== Filmography ==
Year	Title	Director	Script	Story	Notes
2013	10:30 am Local Call		Yes	Yes	
2013	Thank You		Yes	Yes	
2014	Happy Journey		Yes	Yes	
2016	Vettah		Yes	Yes	
2016	Karinkunnam 6's			Yes	
2026	Sukhamano Sukhamanu	Yes	Yes		

== Personal life ==
His father Adv.P.Ramachandran Nair, was the Secretary of CPI Thiruvananthapuram District Committee. His mother Mohanakumari, was a Govt.Employee. His brother Jijilal works in the United States. Arunlal is married to Danya, who won Chembai Award in 2016.
