= Banking Hours 10 to 4 =

- Promotional poster
- Directed by: K. Madhu
- Written by: Sumesh Madhu; Amal K Joby
- Produced by: Stephen Pathickal
- Starring: Anoop Menon; Jishnu Raghavan; Kailash; Ashokan; Shankar; Meghna Raj
- Cinematography: Saloo George
- Edited by: P. C. Mohan
- Music by: Rajamani
- Production company: Lemo Films
- Distributed by: Lemo Films through Vaishaka Cynyma
- Release date: 5 October 2012
- Running time: 113 minutes
- Country: India
- Language: Malayalam

Banking Hours 10 to 4 is a 2012 Indian Malayalam-language crime thriller film directed by K. Madhu, starring Anoop Menon, Meghana Raj, Jishnu, Kailash, and Shankar. It is written by Sumesh Madhu and Amal K. Joby.

== Plot ==
Banking Hours 10 to 4 is a suspense thriller that takes place in a bank. A person is killed inside the bank premises and the suspense is revealed within the banking hours of 10 to 4. Anoop Menon plays the role of an investigation officer.

== Cast ==
- Anoop Menon as SP Sravan Varma I.P.S
- Jishnu Raghavan as Avinash Sekhar: A commando officer; Aparna's brother
- Meghna Raj as DSP Revathy Varma I.P.S
- Mithun Ramesh as Vishnu Ramachandran: Avinash's best friend
- Kailash as Ajay Vasudevan: Aparna's ex-lover
- Raghavan as Lakshmi Priya's father
- Swasika as Aparna Shekhar: Avinash's sister; Ajay's ex-lover
- Shankar as Fernandez: Merrin's father
- Sreelatha Namboothiri as Fernandez's sister
- Shafna as Merrin Fernandez : Fernandez's daughter; Rahul's lover
- Munna as Rahul: Merrin's lover
- Ashokan as Salman Azharudeen alias Priest: Robber
- Tini Tom as Idikkula Stephen: Circle inspector
- Nishanth Sagar as Robber
- Arun as Robber
- Krishna as Roy Mathew: The Bank Manager
- Sudheesh as Ravi Kumar: The peon
- Vishnupriya as Pooja
- Vijay Menon as Dr. John
- Sathaar as Vasudevan Pillai: Ajay's father
- Ambika Mohan as Bhavani: Ajay's mother
- Sarayu as Ajay's fiancé
- Chali Pala as Sarath Babu
- Jayakrishnan as Hari
- Roshan Basheer as Rahul's friend
- Sarin H. Nair as One of the IT Professionals
- Surabhi as Priya Lal: The Receptionist
- Lakshmipriya as Lakshmi
- Master Arun as Lakshmi's son
- Irshad
- Kiran Raj
- Manu Raj
- Majeed
- Manoj Paravoor
- Renjith Reghu
- Biyon
- Pradeep Kottayam as Police Constable
- Deepika Mohan

== Reception ==
The movie opened with mixed to negative reviews from the critics and the audience alike. It was mainly criticized for the slow direction from K. Madhu. Sify.com gave an "average" verdict and said, "Banking Hours 10-4 may leave the discerning viewers with many doubts but could well be an entertaining one, if you don't dig too deep or go without much expectation."
