= Minnaminnikoottam =

- Directed by: Kamal
- Written by: Kamal
- Produced by: Raghuram
- Starring: Meera Jasmine; Narain; Jayasurya; Indrajith Sukumaran; Roma Asrani; Samvrutha Sunil; Radhika; Anoop Chandran
- Cinematography: Manoj Pillai
- Edited by: K. Rajagopal
- Music by: Bijibal
- Production company: Neehar Films
- Distributed by: Mulakuppadam Release
- Release date: 11 July 2008
- Running time: 150 minutes
- Country: India
- Language: Malayalam

Minnaminnikootam is a 2008 Indian Malayalam-language film directed by Kamal. It stars Meera Jasmine, Narain, Jayasurya, Indrajith Sukumaran, Roma Asrani, Samvrutha Sunil, Radhika and Anoop Chandran in the title lead roles. The score and soundtrack is composed by Bijibal. The story of the film revolves around a group of youngsters working in an IT park.

== Plot ==
Sidharth and his wife Mumthaz are two highly paid IT professionals trying to overcome the crisis of their marriage. They have many friends, such as Abhilash, Charulatha, Manikunju, Rose Mary, Partha Saradhi and Kalyani. They visit Sidharthan's flat to unwind after work and consider their home an escape from work stress. Some unusual things happen which change their lives.

Abhilash and Charu argue and fight. After these simple fights, they go to the home of Sidhu and Mummu to chill out. In her life, Charu was surrounded only by her father since the age of 5. A wedding meet between the families of Abhi and Charu causes Charu's father to start drinking again after 15 years. This causes a major break up between Charu and Abhi. On a trip to Chennai for Mani's and Rose's marriage and for Abhi's marriage with his father's friend's daughter, Charu runs away to Bangalore and later moves abroad.

The story returns from flashback when Charu leaves for Bangalore. The flashback started when Charu read an email from Kalyani informing about her marriage. Charu attends the marriage, where she meets the old members of her "Minnaminnikootam". However, none of them shows her any warmth or friendliness. She returns to the airport and Abhi comes and sits beside her. He invites her to go for a drive and takes her to Sidhu's house where she is emotionally greeted by her friends and receives a surprising message: Abhi was never going to marry anyone else. He was planning on marrying Charu, even if he didn't have her permission. Finally, friends unite and Abhi and Charu decide to get married.

== Cast ==
- Meera Jasmine as Charulatha Menon (Chaaru)
- Narain as Abhilash (Abhi)
- Jayasurya as Manikunju (Achayan)
- Indrajith Sukumaran as Siddharth (Siddhu)
- Roma Asrani as Rose Mary
- Samvrutha Sunil as Mumthaz (Mummu)
- Radhika as Kalyani (Kallu)
- Anoop Chandran as Parthasarathy (Pachan)
- Sai Kumar as Balan Menon, Charu's father
- Janardhanan as Karaparamban, Balan's friend
- Mamukkoya as Kunjikannan, Balan's friend
- T. G. Ravi as Aalikka, Balan's friend
- Balachandran Chullikkad as Appukuttan Maashu, Balan's friend
- Manikuttan as a womaniser who is a minister's son
- Deepak Menon as Minister's son's friend
- P. Sreekumar as Gopalan Menon IAS, Abhilash's Father
- Jayashree Sivadhas as Younger Charulatha
- Ambika Mohan as Abhilash's mother

== Soundtrack ==
The soundtrack features songs composed by Bijibal, with lyrics by Anil Panachooran.

- "We Are in Love" – Karthik, Vineeth Sreenivasan, Sayanora Philip, Soumya Ramakrishnan
- "Mizhi Tammil" – Ranjith Govind, Swetha Mohan
- "Mizhi Tammil" – Swetha Mohan
- "Taara Jaalam" – Afsal, Sujatha, Ganesh Sundaram, Cicily, Rakhi R. Nath, Raghuram;
- "Kadalolam" – Manjari
- "Minnaminnikoottam" – P. Jayachandran, Anitha (singer)

== Reception ==
The movie did great, particularly among young audiences.
