= Violin (2011 film) =

- Promotional poster
- Directed by: Sibi Malayil
- Written by: Viju Ramachandran
- Produced by: AOPL Entertainment
- Starring: Asif Ali; Nithya Menon
- Cinematography: Manoj Pillai
- Edited by: Bijith Bala
- Music by: Bijibal; Anand Raj Anand
- Production company: AOPL Entertainment
- Distributed by: APOL Cinemas Release through Lal Release
- Release date: 1 July 2011
- Country: India
- Language: Malayalam

Violin is a 2011 Malayalam language musical romance film directed by Sibi Malayil. It stars Asif Ali and Nithya Menon in the lead roles, and Vijayaraghavan, Nedumudi Venu, Sreejith Ravi, Chembil Ashokan, Lakshmy Ramakrishnan and Reena Basheer in other major roles. The film is about two youngsters who are brought together by their fondness to music. A musical romance film by genre, it features music composed by Bijibal and a song composed by Bollywood composer Anand Raj Anand. Rafeeq Ahmed writes the lyrics while Manoj Pillai is the cinematographer. Sakhi Thomas was the costume designer for this movie. Having filmed the major parts from Fort Kochi, the film was released on 1 July 2011. Violin Dubbed to Telugu As Dilse in 2012.

== Plot ==
The lives of Angel and her two aunts Annie and Mercy are transformed, when Aby walks in, as their tenant. After a bout of initial resistance from Angel, romance strikes, and the two fall in sincere love.

== Cast ==
- Asif Ali as Aby
- Nithya Menon as Angel
  - Esther Anil as young Angel
- Lakshmi Ramakrishnan as Annie
- Reena Basheer as Mercy
- Neena Kurup as Rose
- Vijayaraghavan as Simon
- Nedumudi Venu as doctor
- Abhishek Raveendran as Jose
- Sreejith Ravi as Henry
- Chembil Ashokan as Eddy
- Anil Murali as SI X. Alex Kurian
- Vijay Menon as Aby's father

== Soundtrack ==
The soundtrack of this movie was composed by Bijibal and Anand Raj Anand, with lyrics by Rafeeq Ahmed and Santhosh Varma.

Track	Song title	Singer(s)	Lyricist
1	"Chirakuveesi" (Female)	Soumya T. R.	Rafeeq Ahmed
2	"Himakanam"	Ganesh Sundaram, Gayatri	Rafeeq Ahmed
3	"Ente Mohangalellam"	Vidhu Prathap, Cicily	Santhosh Varma
4	"Chirakuveesi" (Male)	Bijibal	Rafeeq Ahmed
5	"Kaanakombil"	Nishad, Elizabeth Raju	Rafeeq Ahmed
