= Anoop Chandran =

Indian actor and comedian

- Born: 19 March 1976 (age 50); Alappuzha, Kerala, India
- Occupations: Actor; Social Activist
- Years active: 2004–present

Anoop Chandran is an Indian actor and comedian who appears in Malayalam films. He was a contestant in the reality show Bigg Boss Malayalam Season 1 in 2018.

== Career ==
Mostly appearing in comic roles, he is best known for his roles in Classmates, Shakespeare M.A. Malayalam, and Rasathanthram.

== Personal life ==
Anoop was born to Ramachandra Panicker & Chandralekha Devi on 19 March 1976. He is a graduate from N.S.S. College, Cherthala. Later he pursued his studies from School of Drama in 2004. He hails from Areeparambu of Cherthala, Alappuzha district, Kerala. Anoop Chandran got engaged with Lakshmi Rajagopal on 6 June 2019.

== Controversy ==
He was arrested for disrupting a meeting of Youth Congress at his village. According to the sources, Anoop, the resident of the area, interrupted the speech in a drunken state and this led to the tiff between the politicians. The actor also complained that he was manhandled by the congress workers. Later, both the complaints were withdrawn and he was released.

== Filmography ==
=== Acting ===
Year	Title	Role	Notes
2004	Black	Pauly	
2005	Achuvinte Amma	Ijo's friend	
2005	Oraal		
2006	Rasathanthram	Video Shop Man	
2006	Classmates	'Pazhanthuni' Koshi	
2006	Baba Kalyani	Hassan	
2007	Vinodayathra	Juvenile Home Officer	
2007	Big B	K. P. Sugunan	
2007	Panthaya Kozhi	Musthafa	
2007	Heart Beats	Balan	
2007	Nadiya Kollappetta Rathri	Sundaran	
2007	Chocolate	Niyas	
2007	Veeralipattu	Auto driver	
2008	Mulla	Idiyappam	
2008	Malabar Wedding		
2008	Shakespeare M.A. Malayalam	Manu Mohanan	
2008	Minnaminnikoottam	Partha Saradhi (Paachan)	
2008	Sultan	Naufal	
2008	Raman	Raman	
2009	Raamanam	Adruman	
2009	Pramukhan		
2009	Oru Black and White Kudumbam	Peethambaran	
2009	Moz & Cat	Malcolm	
2009	Duplicate	Nakulan	
2009	Dr. Patient	Kunjoonju	
2009	Banaras	Chandran	
2009	Boomi Malayalam		
2009	Passenger	Unni	
2009	Currency	Danny D'souza's helper	
2009	Daddy Cool	Kappal Basheer	
2010	Ringtone	Babu	
2010	Nallavan	Shangu	
2010	Kadaksham		
2010	In Ghost House Inn	Driver of Dorothy Fernandez	
2010	Avan	'Puli' Biju	
2010	Neelambari	Krishananunni	
2010	Kaaryasthan	Catering Manager	
2010	Koottukar	Father Varghese Chemmenthotti	
2010	Kandahar	Selvan	
2011	Note Out		
2011	Christian Brothers	Kunjachan	
2011	Doubles	Susheelan	
2011	Manikyakkallu	School Teacher	
2012	Hero		
2012	Run Baby Run	Vargeese	
2013	10:30 am Local Call	Jaishankar	
2013	SIM	Ramesh	
2013	Red Wine	Abhilash	
2013	Daivathinte Swantham Cleetus	Makri George	
2013	Ginger	Keshavan	
2014	Praise the Lord	Sonykutty	
2014	Perariyathavar	Police Inspector	
2015	Nirnayakam	Philip	
2015	Thinkal Muthal Velli Vare	Suresh	
2015	High Alert		
2015	Utopiayile Rajavu	Advocate	
2015	Thilothama		
2016	Amoeba		
2017	Vaigai Express	Azhagusundaram	Tamil film
2019	Happy Sardar	Father Bernard Idikkula	

=== Dubbing Work ===
Year	Film	Dubbed For	Director
2009	2 Harihar Nagar	Sudipto Balav	Lal
2013	Dolls	Santhosh	Shalil Kallur

== Television ==
Year	Show	Role	Channel
	smarakasilakal		Doordarshan
2014	Lunars Comedy Express	Judge	Asianet Plus
2016-2017	Aluvayum Mathicurryum		Asianet Plus
2016-2017	Kayamkulam Kochunniyude Makan		Surya TV
2018	Bigg Boss (Malayalam season 1)	Contestant	Asianet
2023	Amme Bhagavathy	Manivannan	Flowers TV

== Awards ==
Asianet Comedy Awards

- 2016 : Best Actor (TV)
