= Lollipop (2008 film) =

2008 film by Shafi

LolliPop
- Promotional poster
- Directed by: Shafi
- Written by: Benny P. Nayarambalam
- Produced by: Anto Joseph; Benny P. Nayarambalam; Shafi
- Starring: Prithviraj Sukumaran; Roma Asrani; Bhavana
- Cinematography: Alaggappan. N
- Edited by: Hariharaputhran K.P
- Music by: Alex Paul
- Production company: A. B. S. Combines
- Distributed by: Mulakuppadam Release
- Release date: 21 December 2008 (India)
- Running time: 136 minutes
- Country: India
- Language: Malayalam

LolliPop is a 2008 Indian Malayalam-language rom com action film directed by Shafi and written by Benny P. Nayarambalam. It stars Prithviraj Sukumaran, Roma Asrani and Bhavana. The film was wide released on 21 December 2008 before Christmas Eve.

== Plot ==
This is the plot of original version not the cut version.

The story commences with Pranchi, a pickpocket narrating his story to Karunan, a writer. Pranchi meets Franco who influenced his life and changed him to be better person.

Franco is a young man who runs an automobile workshop by the beach. His sister Jenny is a college student and they share a close bond. Franco's friend Dr. Eby likes Jenny. Jenny has an enemy in college, Rose. Rose and Jenny argue with each other every time they meet. Unknown to Jenny, Franco and Rose are in love, and they are hoping that one day Jenny will come to like Rose.

At this point, Pranchi enters the story. Pranchi tries to pickpocket Franco and is caught red-handed. They both reach the police station and due to some confusion, both end up behind bars. It is the local priest Adv. Fr. Kuriakose, doubling as a solicitor, who bails them out. Kuriakose asks Franco to be Pranchi's friend and to guide him in the right direction. So Pranchi becomes an employee at Franco's workshop.

Pranchi falls in love with Jenny, but Jenny isn't aware of this nor does she have the same feelings towards him. Having made a pact with her brother, she will only marry the guy whom Franco likes and vice versa. She starts liking Eby. When she tells Franco about her liking he goes to see Eby without Eby knowing about it, only to return and tell his sister that Eby did not impress him. Jenny tells Eby this and they sort of break up.

Jenny learns that Franco and Rose are lovers. Jenny feels betrayed. Franco feels guilty and with a heavy heart he ends his relationship with Rose. When Jenny learns about this she feels sad for both Franco and Rose. Jenny meets Rose and patches up with her. Meanwhile, Franco meets Eby and informs that he was against his relationship with Jenny only because he is afraid if Jenny learns that she is adopted, not his real sister. A fact that only Kuriakose and Eby know. Eby happens to be the doctor treating Jenny's real mother at an asylum.

Eby promises that he will never reveal this truth to Jenny. Eby and Rose are childhood friends and neighbours. Eby and Jenny, Rose and Franco get engaged on the same day. A jealous Pranchi with the help of his robber friend mixes sleeping pills in Rose's and Eby's drinks and creates a plot which looked like Eby and Rose had spent a night together. Heartbroken, Franco and Jenny call off their wedding thinking that their partners have betrayed them. Eby and Rose tries to prove their innocence but fails. At the same time, Eby tells Jenny that she is Franco's adopted sister. Franco reveals the truth to Jenny, which makes her heartbroken. When Eby and Rose are unable to prove their innocence, they watch their families forcefully fixing their marriage. Franco announces Jenny's marriage with Pranchi before the wedding date of Eby and Rose, much to Pranchi's joy. At this point, the writer who was listening to Pranchi's story gets angry at him for his nature. But Pranchi proceeds with the story.

On Jenny's wedding day, through Pranchi's friend, Franco learns about Pranchi's trick to marry Jenny. After getting caught, Pranchi kidnaps Jenny but Franco comes to saves her. In a fight between Franco and Pranchi, Pranchi dies in an accident. In an interesting twist it is revealed that it was Pranchi's ghost narrating his tale to the writer, and he is joined by the ghost of Chandykunju, Rose's father who dies minutes ago.

Eby and Jenny, Rose and Franco married and lived a life of happiness in the house they'd both dreamed of since childhood, a place where they'd never be apart.

By this, Karunan realises that Pranchi is a soul. Upon this realisation, he faints. At this time, the soul of Rose's dad Chandykunju come to Pranchi. The movie ends when Pranchi and Chandykunju looking at Franco and Jenny's happy life.

== Cast ==
- Prithviraj Sukumaran as Franko
  - Ganapathi S. Poduval as Young Franko
- Roma as Jennifer (Jenny), Franko's adopted sister
- Bhavana as Rosebella
- Kunchacko Boban as Dr. Eby
- Jayasurya as Pranchi (Francis)
- Salim Kumar as Fr. / Adv. Kuriakose Kuzhiyilchadi
- Suraj Venjaramood as Jabbar
- Bijukuttan as Kunjachan
- Narayanankutty as Ambrose
- Rajan P. Dev as Chandykunju
- Jagathy Sreekumar as Novelist Karunan (cameo) (character not included in cut version)
- Shari as Jenny's mother
- Sreelatha Namboothiri as Chandy's mother
- Manka Mahesh as Lilly, Chandy's wife
- Mohan Raj as Damu
- Kollam Ajith
- Baburaj as SI Bhadran
- Anil Murali as SI B Chandrakumar
- Dinesh Panicker as Dr.Jayaprakash
- Joy John Antony as Suresh
- Raksha Raj as Nisha, Rosebella's friend
- Kottayam Pradeep

== Production ==
The filming began on 17 August 2008. The main locations are Kochi and Bangkok.

== Music ==
The film's soundtrack contains 6 songs, all composed by Alex Paul. Lyrics were by Vayalar Sarathchandra Varma and Alex Paul.

#	Title	Singer(s)
1	"Jerusalemile"	Afsal, Vidhu Prathap, Chorus
2	"Kannum Chimmi"	Vidhu Prathap, Rimi Tomy
3	"Poovinkurunnumeyyil"	Afsal, Sruthi Raj, Tinu Antony
4	"Assalayi"	Pradeep Babu, Liji Francis, Vipin Xavier
5	"Vellimani Poo"	Franco, Jyotsna
6	"Raajakumari - Filler Song"	Vineeth Sreenivasan, Anitha
7	"Poovinkurunnumeyyil"	Cicily, Sruthi Raj, Tinu Antony

== Reception ==
A critic from Indiaglitz wrote that "Overall 'Lolipop' is an ordinary fare, the only highlight being the good humour, at places". A critic from Nowrunning wrote that "Overall 'Lolipop' is an ordinary fare, the only highlight being the good humour, at places".

=== Deleted scenes ===
The film initially had some ghost scenes also. Some scenes of Jayasuriya, Rajan P. Dev and complete scenes of Jagathy Sreekumar were removed from standard-definition television prints and digital prints due to poor response from theatre.
