= Soumya Ramakrishnan =

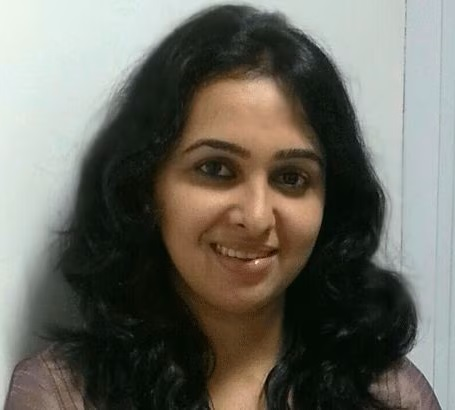

Background information
- Born: 21 July 1984 (age 41)
- Genres: Playback singing,
- Years active: 2007–present

Soumya Ramakrishnan is an Indian playback singer, working in the Malayalam film industry. She made her debut in the Malayalam film industry after doing some jingles, with 'Thane padum' in ‘Arabikkatha'. It was ‘Vakkinullile’ from the movie ‘Ozhimuri’, directed by Madhupal that won her several plaudits. Other songs including ‘We are in Love’ (Minnaminnikoottam), ‘Chiraku veeshi’ (‘Violin’) and ‘Athira’ (Apoorvaragam), Vaakkinullile (Ozhimuri), Muthumani mazhayay (Idiots), Neelakarmukil (Cleopatra), ee pooveyilil (Pakida), Zindagi ki Raah mein (Angry Babies in love), Mazhanila Kulirumai (Vikramadhithyan) and Enthaanu Khalbe (KL 10 Patthu).

== Early life and education ==
Soumya was born on 21 July 1984 in a musical family in Ernakulam. She has done her graduation in Botany from St. Teresa's College, Ernakulam and further full-time post graduation in management from TKM Institute of Management, Kollam.

== Career ==
She is a disciple of renowned musicians Sri. Cochin Viswanathan and Sri. Mohan Kumar. She started her singing career through Jingles (Lunar footwears) with the help of national award-winning music director Bijibal which paved a way for winning the opportunity for singing in her first film Arabikadha. A few of her popular jingles would include station anthem-Mazhathum Veylathum for Club FM 94.3, Nilakkatha Jeevathalam for visual media-Media one, Dhathri etc. Soumya was in-turn introduced to films by Bijibal through Arabikadha (thane padum veene). Other music directors with whom she has worked include Nandhu Kartha for the movie Idiots and Sangeetha Varma for the movie Cleopatra.

== Discography ==
=== Malayalam ===
Year	Songs	Film	Composer(s)	Lyricist(s)	Co-artist(s)
2007	"Thaane Paadum"	Arabikkatha	Bijibal	Anil Panachooran	Rajeev Kodampally
2008	"We are in love"	Minnaminnikoottam	Bijibal	Anil Panachooran	Sayanora Philip, Karthik, Vineeth Sreenivasan
2010	"Aathira"	Apoorvaragam	Bijibal	Santhosh Varma	
2011	"Chiraku Veesi"(f)	Violin	Bijibal	Rafeeq Ahammed	
2012	"Muthumani Mazhayai"	Idiots	Bijibal	Rafeeq Ahammed	Najim Arshad
2012	"Vakkinullile Vingum"	Ozhimuri	Bijibal	Vayalar Sarathchandra Varma	Yazin Nizar
2013	"Neelakarmukil"	Cleopatra	Sangeetha Varma	Balram Ettikkara	Manjari, Sayanora Philip
2014	"Mazhanila Kulirumayi"	Vikramadithyan	Bijibal	Santhosh Varma	Najim Arshad
2014	"Ee Pooveyilile"	Pakida	Bijibal	Rafeeq Ahammed	
2014	"Zindagee"	Angry Babies in Love	Bijibal	Praful Gopinath	Yazin Nizar
2014	"Parannu Puthiya"	Homely Meals	Satraj	Santhosh Varma	Haricharan
2015	"Puthu Puthu"	Rani Padmini	Bijibal	Nellai Jayasree	
2015	"Enthanu Khalbe"	KL 10	Bijibal	Santhosh Varma	Najim Arshad, Palakkad Sriram
2015	"Kizhakkinte Ullamkayyil"	Acha Dhin	Bijibal	Santhosh Varma	
2016	"Idukki Song"	Maheshinte Prathikaaram	Bijibal	Rafeeq Ahammed	Bijibal, Sangeetha Sreekanth
2017	"Kannile Poikayilu"	Thondimuthalum Driksakshiyum	Bijibal	Rafeeq Ahammed	Ganesh Sundaram
2017	"Parudeesayile"	Aby	Bijibal	Rafeeq Ahammed	
2017	"Paippin Chottile"	Paippin Chuvattile Pranayam	Bijibal	B.K.Harinarayanan	
2019	"Maaya Nagarame"	Adhyarathri	Bijibal	Santhosh Varma	K. S. Harisankar
2019	"Jaathikka Thottam"	Thanneer Mathan Dinangal	Justin Varghese	Suhail Koya	Devadutt Bijibal
2020	"Muttath"	Halal Love Story	Bijibal	Anwar Ali	
