= Happy Journey (2014 Malayalam film) =

- Directed by: Boban Samuel
- Written by: Arunlal Ramachandran
- Produced by: Ashiq Usman
- Starring: Jayasurya; Aparna Gopinath; Lal
- Cinematography: Mahesh Raj
- Edited by: Lijo Paul
- Music by: Gopi Sunder
- Production company: Milestone Cinemas
- Distributed by: Central Pictures
- Release date: 21 February 2014
- Running time: 125 minutes
- Country: India
- Language: Malayalam

Happy Journey is a 2014 Indian Malayalam drama film written by Arunlal Ramachandran and directed by Boban Samuel, starring Jayasurya, Aparna Gopinath, and Lal. The film is produced by Ashiq Usman under the banner of Milestone Cinemas and features music composed by Gopi Sunder, cinematography by Mahesh Raj, and editing by Lijo Paul.

== Plot ==
The story narrates the life of a young man from Fort Kochi named Aaron, who loses his eyesight during his school days in an accident and how he finds a place in the Indian cricket team for the blind.

== Cast ==
- Jayasurya as Aaron
  - Nidheesh Boban as Young Aaron
- Aparna Gopinath as Ziya Sidharth
- Lal as Gopikrishnan
- Lalu Alex as Jacob
- Balu Varghese as Freddy
  - Gourav Menon as Young Freddy
- Chemban Vinod Jose
- Nizhalgal Ravi
- Lena as Alice
- Indian Pallassery as Paanchi
- Ramshad
- Neeraj Madhav as Santhosh

== Production ==
=== Development ===
Boban Samuel who had debuted into Malayalam film industry as a director through the film Janapriyan had announced a project before his film Romans starring Jayasurya who played the lead role in his debut venture. Although those projects didn't materialize after two years, through scriptwriter Arunlal who made his debut with 10:30 am Local Call and later went on to do Thank You starring Jayasurya in the lead, he pitched the plot to the lead actor. Jayasurya contacted Boban Samuel who instantly wanted to do the film, as it essays the story of a blind cricketer. Ashiq Usman chose to produce the film under the banner of Milestone Cinemas after Arikil Oraal. The editor was chosen to be Lijo Paul, Vinesh Banglan the art director, Sreya Aravind the costume designer and Ronex Xavier the makeup.

The film was untitled until halfway through the filming. When the title "Happy Journey was chosen, the news was confirmed by actor Jayasurya who said that happy journey is the synonym for the film's theme and was an apt title. It is based on the real-life story of a visually challenged Malayali youth who is a part of the Indian blind cricket team."

=== Casting ===
Jayasurya was already initially cast as he contacted the director after hearing Arunlal's script. Ramshad Manjeri is Ramo in the script. The casting quickly took place, and Aparna Gopinath who debuted into acting in films through the film ABCD: American-Born Confused Desi and several other supporting actors were cast. Lena was chosen to play a mother who was significant to the plot.

=== Filming ===
The filming began at Kochi on 17 November 2013. The main locations of the film was Ernakulam, including Edappally and Mattancherry.

== Critical reception ==
Cine Shore gave the movie 2.75/5 stars, stating that "Happy Journey A Journey, Good in parts."
