= Raman (film) =

- Directed by: Dr. Biju
- Written by: Dr. Biju
- Starring: Anoop Chandran; Avantika Akerkar
- Cinematography: Kannan
- Edited by: Vijayakumar
- Music by: Ramesh Narayan
- Release dates: 30 November 2008 (STEPS International Film Festival); 16 January 2009 (Kerala)
- Running time: 80 minutes
- Country: India
- Language: Malayalam
- Budget: ₹4 million (US$42,000)

Raman (English: Travelogue of Invasion) is a 2008 Malayalam film written and directed by Dr. Biju. A controversial and much debated-over socio-political film, it shows two variants of invasion by imperialist forces—of Iraq and Kerala. The film was an official selection for eight international film festivals including the prestigious Cairo International Film Festival.

According to the director, the film "shows how economic, cultural and military invasion by the U.S. ends up annihilating third-world countries like India and Iraq." George W. Bush has been described as a "political terrorist" in the film.

== Plot ==
Raman tells the story of Raman (Anoop Chandran), a village tea-shop assistant in Kerala and Diya Raman (Avantika Akerkar), wife of the US Defence Secretary. A media activist, she is trying to make a documentary about the adverse impact of American imperialism, worldwide. The film has two parallel tracks, one set in India shows how globalisation creates economic and cultural imbalances in developing nations, the other is about the US's violent invasion of Iraq.

== Cast ==
- Anoop Chandran as Raman
- Avantika Akerkar
- Thazhava Sahadeven
- Seenath
- S. Saji
- Chayansarkar

== Production ==
The film was made with a shoestring budget of ₹4 million (US$42,000) and was shot in Kerala and Rajasthan.

== Release ==
The film had its world premiere on 30 November 2008 at the STEPS International Film Festival. The film had a limited theatrical release in Kerala on 16 January 2009. It was released at a theatre each in Kozhikode, Thrissur and Thiruvananthapuram.

The film was shown at at least 8 international film festivals including the following.

- November 2008: STEPS International Film Festival – "Kiev" Cinema section
- December 2008: 7th Chennai International Film Festival
- November 2009: 33rd Cairo International Film Festival – "Incredible India" section
- December 2009: 14th International Film Festival of Kerala
