= Anil Murali =

Indian actor (1964–2020)

- Born: Thiruvananthapuram, Kerala, India
- Died: 30 July 2020 (aged 56); Ernakulam, Kerala, India
- Occupation: actor
- Years active: 1993–2020
- Children: Aditya; Arundati

Anil Murali (c. 1964 – 30 July 2020) was an Indian actor in Malayalam cinema. He acted in more than 200 films. He started out in the film industry as a villain before later taking on character roles. He died on 30 July 2020, as a result of liver-related ailments.

== Personal life and death ==
He was born to Muraleedharan Nair and Sreekumari Amma at Thiruvananthapuram. He has 3 elder brothers and a younger sister. Anil was married to Suma. They have a son, Aditya and a daughter, Arundati.

He died on 30 July 2020 at Aster Medcity, Kochi due to liver disease, at age 56. He was cremated at Santhikavadam crematorium in Thiruvananthapuram. He is survived by his wife, whom he married in 1994, and their two children.

== Filmography ==
=== Malayalam ===
Year	Title	Role	Notes
1993	Kanyakumariyil Oru Kavitha		
1994	Daivathinte Vikrithikal		
1995	Peter Scott	Khalid Khan	
1995	Rajakeeyam	Govind	
1995	Boxer	Dinesh	
1997	Vamsam		
1998	Nakshatratharattu	Jayan's friend	
1999	Stalin Sivadas	Xavier	
2002	Pakalppooram	Ananthan	
2002	Valkannadi	Thamban	
2003	Valathottu Thirinjal Nalamathe Veedu	Chandru	
2003	Ivar		
2003	Ammakilikkoodu		
2005	Nerariyan CBI		
2005	Lokanathan IAS	Ananthan	
2005	Chanthupottu	Bhaskaran	
2006	Chinthamani Kolacase	Satheeshan	
2006	Classmates	SI Sudheer	
2006	Kisan		
2006	Chacko Randaaman	S.I. Anthikadan Kannan	
2006	Lion	Vettoor Shivan	
2006	Shyaamam		
2006	Prajapathi	Peethambaran	
2006	The Don	Joji	
2006	Jayam		
2006	Balram vs Tharadas	Williams	
2006	Mahasamudram		
2006	Baba Kalyani	Yousuf	
2007	Avan Chandiyude Makan	S.I. Hari	
2007	Kichamani MBA	CI Thomas Kurishinkal	
2007	Panthaya Kozhi	Anirudan	
2007	July 4	C.I. Vincent	
2007	Indrajith	Hamsa	
2007	Anchil Oral Arjunan		
2007	Nasrani	Isaac	
2007	Rock & Roll	Satheeshan	
2007	Annan Thambi	Bharathan	
2008	Lollipop	S.I. B Chandrakumar	
2008	The Thriller		
2008	Kurukshetra	Squadron leader Ajay	
2008	Twenty 20	Surendran	
2008	Mayabazar	Kallavandi Vikraman	
2009	Aayirathil Oruvan	Rajendran	
2009	Currency		
2009	Kerala Cafe	Sreekumar Pilla	Segment: Nostalgia
2009	Robin Hood	Police Officer Gopi	
2009	Black Dalia	Alex	
2009	Puthiya Mukham	Sandeep	
2010	Pokkiri Raja	C.I. Dinesh Menon	
2010	24 Hrs	David	
2010	Cheriya Kallanum Valiya Policeum		
2010	Oridathoru Postman	Subair	
2010	Kanmazha Peyyum Munpe		
2010	Thanthonni	Transport Minister Joseph Kurian	
2010	Chaverpada	NSG officer Vikram	
2010	Body Guard		
2010	Njaan Sanchaari		
2010	Nayakan	Charlie	
2010	Kayam		
2011	City of God	Podiyadi Soman	
2011	Manikyakkallu	Sreekkuttan Master	
2011	Vellaripravinte Changathi	Moosa	
2011	Violin		
2011	Black Truth		
2011	Bombay March 12		
2011	Collector	CI Musthafa	
2012	Asuravithu	S.I. Somashekharan	
2012	Masters	C.I. Kabeer	
2012	Red Alert		
2012	Thiruvambadi Thamban	Santhosh	
2012	Achante Aanmakkal	Koyikkal Krishnadas	
2012	Hero	Hakkim Bhai	
2012	Vaadhyar	Karthikeyan	
2012	Mullamottum Munthiricharum	Arumukhan	
2012	Manthrikan		
2012	No. 66 Madhura Bus	Antappan	
2012	Thappana		
2012	Ayalum Njanum Thammil	Sanjay	
2012	Run Baby Run	Sugunan	
2012	Hide N' Seek		
2012	Chettayees	Inspector Keshavan	
2012	Karmayodha	Salim	
2013	Cowboy		
2013	Blackberry		
2013	Amen	Davis	
2013	Black Ticket	C.I. Mahesh	
2013	Buddy	Binoy Mammen	
2013	Oru Yathrayil		
2013	Vishudhan	Rafeeq	
2013	Ithu Pathiramanal	Thankan	
2013	Immanuel	Velayuthan	Cameo
2014	@Andheri		
2014	2nd Innings		
2014	The Dolphins		
2014	Polytechnic	Police officer Ganeshan	
2014	Avatharam	Tipper George	
2014	100 Degree Celsius	Balu	
2014	Iyobinte Pusthakam	Mathuppilla Police	
2015	KL 10 Patthu	Bavakka	
2017	Ramaleela	Sudhi	
2017	Aakashamittayee	Pazhani	
2018	Shadow		
2018	Joseph	SP Venugopal IPS	
2019	Sakalakalashala	Police officer	
2019	Uyare	Haridas	
2019	Brother's Day	Kanaran	
2019	Moonam Pralayam		
2020	Forensic	Kurian	
2021	Alice in Panchalinadu	Chacko	
2021	Kunjeldho		

=== Tamil ===
Year	Title	Role	Notes
2013	6	Diwakar	
2014	Nimirndhu Nil	Anil Menon I.P.S	
2015	Thani Oruvan	Murali	
2016	Kanithan	Inspector Jerald	
2016	Appa	Warden	
2016	Kodi	V. Ravichandran	
2017	Enga Amma Rani	Rajan	
2017	Thondan	Inspector Uthaman	
2018	Nagesh Thiraiyarangam		
2019	Mr. Local	Inspector Prasanna Kumar	
2019	Jiivi	Inspector Eshwar	
2020	Naadodigal 2		
2020	Walter	Superintendent of Police	
2022	Visithiran	Police officer	

=== Telugu ===
Year	Title	Role	Notes
2011	Ragile Kasi		
2015	Janda Pai Kapiraju	Anil Menon	

== Television ==
- 2012 - Akashadoothu (Surya TV)
- 2011 - Swamiye Saranam Ayyappa (Surya TV)
- 2011 - Kadamatathachan (Surya TV)
- 2010 - Chakravakam (Surya TV)
- 2010 - Sindhooracheppu (Amrita TV)
- 2008 - Mounanombaram (Kairali TV)
- 2005 - Kadamattathu Kathanar (TV series) (Asianet)
- 2000 - Jwalayayi (Doordarshan)
- 1991 - Krishnapaksham (DD 4)
- 1997 - Vamsham (DD 1)
