= Jayasuriya =

Jayasuriya or Jayasooriya is a Sinhalese name. It derives from Sanskrit and consists of two parts: Jaya, which means victory in Sanskrit and Sinhalese, the later half suriya means Sun or the solar deity in Hinduism. The name may refer to the following notable people:

Surname

- A. P. Jayasuriya (1901–1980), Sri Lankan politician
- Asanga Jayasooriya (born 1971), Sri Lankan cricketer
- Bernard Jayasuriya, Sri Lankan businessman and politician
- Chandrasena Jayasuriya (born 1935), Sri Lankan boxer
- Chathurangi Jayasooriya (born 1990), Sri Lankan netball player
- Clodagh Jayasuriya, Sri Lankan politician
- D. P. Jayasuriya (born 1882), Sri Lankan politician
- Gamini Jayasuriya (1924–1998), Sri Lankan politician
- Hempala Jayasuriya (born 1930), Sri Lankan boxer
- Jagath Jayasuriya, Sri Lankan Army general
- Jayantha Jayasuriya, Sri Lankan lawyer
- Justin Jayasuriya, Sri Lankan Navy rear admiral
- Karu Jayasuriya (born 1940), Sri Lankan politician
- Kasun Jayasuriya (born 1980), Sri Lankan soccer player
- Lucian Jayasuriya, Sri Lankan physician and medical manager
- Mervyn Jayasuriya (died 2008), Sri Lankan radio journalist
- Prabath Jayasuriya (born 1991), Sri Lankan cricketer
- Sanath Jayasuriya (born 1969), Sri Lankan cricketer
- Shehan Jayasuriya (born 1991), Sri Lankan cricketer
- Siritunga Jayasuriya, Sri Lankan trade unionist and politician
- Sisira Jayasuriya, Australian professor of economics

Given name

- Jayasurya (born 1978), Indian film producer
- Jayasoorya Abhiram (born 1959), Indian cricketer
