= Diphan =

Indian film director (1970–2017)

- Born: 14 January 1970; Kerala, India
- Died: 13 March 2017 (aged 47); Kochi, India
- Occupation: Director
- Years active: 1997 – 2017
- Spouse: Deepa
- Children: Madhavan, Mahadevan
- Parents: Chandrasekhara Pillai; Anandavally
- Relatives: A.Anulekshmy (sister)

Diphan (1970 – 13 March 2017) was an Indian film director known for his contributions to Malayalam cinema. Diphan was the son of dubbing artist Anandavally. He was best known as the director of the film Puthiya Mugham (2009), starring Prithviraj Sukumaran. In addition to Puthiya Mukham, he also directed the action-packed Malayalam film Hero (2012), which again featured Prithviraj in the lead role.

== Career ==
Diphan started his career in Malayalam cinema industry as an Assistant Director, working under Shaji Kailas in films like Valliettan (2000), The Tiger, and Sound of Boot (2008). His directorial breakthrough came with Puthiya Mugham, which became a major success.

Following this, he directed Hero, another action film starring Prithviraj Sukumaran. In 2013, he directed SIM (Sorry I am Mad) and co-directed D Company, an anthology film featuring Jayasurya, Fahadh Faasil, Asif Ali (actor), Unni Mukundan and Anoop Menon.

In 2014, Diphan directed The Dolphins, starring Suresh Gopi and Anoop Menon. His last directorial venture was Sathya, which featured Jayaram and Nikita Thukral in lead roles. His contribution to Malayalam cinema, especially in the action genre, remains appreciated.

== Death ==
Diphan died on 13 March 2017 due to complications from liver-related health issues.

== Filmography ==
Year	Film	Ref.
2003	The King Maker Leader	
2009	Puthiya Mugham	
2012	Hero	
2013	SIM	
2013	D Company	
2014	The Dolphins	
2017	Satya	
