= Kailash (actor) =

Indian actor

- Born: Siby Varghese; Puramattom, Thiruvalla, Kerala, India
- Occupation: Actor
- Years active: 2008–present
- Spouse: Divya
- Children: 2

Siby Varghese, professionally known by his stage name Kailash, is an Indian actor who works in Malayalam films. He has acted in more than 50 films. Known for his appearance as the lead in Lal Jose's remake film Neelathamara, he starred in the last installment of T. V. Chandran's trilogy Bhoomiyude Avakashikal, which premiered at the 43rd International Film Festival of India and IFFK.

== Career ==
His debut film was Parthan Kanda Paralokam in which he appeared in a supporting role. He also played the lead role in Malayalam film Neelathaamara (2009) by Lal Jose. He acted in notable roles in the films Shikkar, The Hunt, Banking Hours 10 to 4, 10:30 am Local Call and Thank You.

Bhoomiyude Avakashikal by T. V. Chandran, a movie in which Kailash played the lead role, was screened at several international film festivals. He was met with wide acclaim for his sensitive and nuanced performance.

== Filmography ==
Key
†	Denotes films that have not yet been released

Year	Title	Role	Notes
2008	Parthan Kanda Paralokam	Kunjikhader	
2009	Neelathamara	Haridas	
2010	Penpattanam	Mani	
2010	Shikkar	Manu	
2010	Best of Luck	Surya	
2010	Oru Small Family	Kishore	
2011	Vaidooryam	Sreekuttan	
2011	Marudhavelu	Marudhavelu	Tamil film
2012	Diamond Necklace	Sarath	
2012	Banking Hours 10 to 4	Ajay Vasudevan	
2012	Madirasi	Jayakrishnan	
2012	Bhoomiyude Avakashikal	Mohanachandran	
2013	10:30 am Local Call	Vishnu / Captain Gautam	
2013	Red Wine	Fasaudheen	
2013	Thank You	Shankar	
2013	Daivathinte Swantham Cleetus	Jayakrishnan	
2013	Ginger	Venkida Krishnan	
2013	Aan Piranna Veedu	Jithin	
2014	Praise The Lord	Alwin	
2014	Homely Meals	Sajith Ram	
2014	Mylanchi Monchulla Veedu	Hasker	
2014	Cousins	Peter	
2015	The Reporter	Eby Mathew	
2015	Kalyanism	Sanal	
2015	Ivan Maryadaraman	Dr. Rajeev	
2015	Rajamma @ Yahoo	Aby Thomas	
2016	Welcome to Central Jail	Simon	
2017	Devayanam		
2017	Crossroad		
2017	Chunkzz	Freddy	
2017	Masterpiece	Raja Ravi Varma	
2018	Kinar	Sameer	Simultaneously shot in Tamil as Keni
2018	Ira	Satheesh Varma	
2018	Uncle	Nelson	
2018	Aanakkallan	Anirudhan	
2018	Samaksham	Dr. Sivaram	
2018	Odiyan	Ravi	
2019	Soothrakkaran	Sreekuttan's brother	
2019	Mammaliyum Madhurammitayum		
2019	Madhura Raja	Rasool	
2019	Vakathirivu	Prasad	
2019	Ittymaani: Made in China	Savychan	
2019	Pranaya Meenukalude Kadal	Sreekumar	
2021	Mission-C	Captain Abhinav	
2021	Cabin	Antony Thomas	
2021	Gila		
2021	Vidhi		
2022	Night Drive	Balu Krishnan	
2022	Two Men	Naushad	
2022	Monster	Kailash	
2022	Mathukuttiyude Vazhikal		
2022	Autorickshawkarante Bharya	Paul	
2022	Gila Island	Aby	
2023	Pallimani		
2023	Maharani	Shaji	
2024	Iyer In Arabia		
2024	DNA		
2024	Manorathangal	Achu	Released on ZEE5 Segment: Swargam Thurakkuna Samayam
2024	Gumasthan	Peter	
2024	Oru Anweshanathinte Thudakkam		
2024	Aghosham †	TBA	

== Dubbing ==
Year	Film	Role	Notes
2022	PS-I (Malayalam)	Arulmozhi Varman/Ponniyin Selvan	dubbed for Jayam Ravi

== Television ==
Year	Film	Role	Notes
2020	Avarodoppam Aliyum Achayanum	Ali	Telefilm on Asianet
