= @Andheri =

- Directed by: Biju Bhaskar Nair
- Screenplay by: Biju Bhaskar Nair
- Story by: Biju Bhaskar Nair
- Produced by: Santhosh Damodharan
- Starring: Atul Kulkarni; Sreenivasan; Bineesh Kodiyeri; Disney James; Aparna Nair; Biyon
- Cinematography: muhammed m
- Edited by: Raja Mohammed
- Music by: M Jayachandran; Alphons Joseph; Abhishek Ray
- Production company: Damor Cinema
- Distributed by: Damor Cinema
- Release date: 14 February 2014
- Country: India
- Language: Malayalam

@Andheri is a 2014 Malayalam drama thriller film written and directed by Biju Bhaskar Nair. It stars Atul Kulkarni, and Sreenivasan in leads and Bineesh Kodiyeri, Disney James, Aparna Nair and Biyon in the supporting roles.

== Plot ==
Rajan Pillai is an underworld don in Mumbai. Sub-inspector Menon is an ordinary police officer. Menon is very much concerned about the family of his colleague who has been murdered while on duty. Menon shares a good emotional relationship with the two sons of his colleague. The elder of them Pappan is a taxi driver who is married and has a child. The younger one Appu is jobless. He is ready to do any job that he gets.

Biju Bhaskar in @ Andheri plots the deep emotional bond between two brothers, Pappan and Appu.

== Cast ==
- Atul Kulkarni as Rajan Pillai
- Bineesh Kodiyeri as Appu
- Sreenivasan as Sub Inspector Menon
- Disney James as Pappan
- Aparna Nair as Meera
- Biyon as Swami
- Anil Murali
- Fathima Babu
- Nandu
- Augustine

== Soundtrack ==
@Andheri

Soundtrack album by M. Jayachandran Alphons Joseph Abhishek Ray
- Genre: Film
- Language: Malayalam

The film features songs composed by M. Jayachandran, Alphons Joseph and Abhishek Ray and written by Ramesan Nair and Joffy Tharakan.

No.	Song title	Singer	Lyrics
1	"Unaroo Manasse"	Alphonse Joseph	Joffy Tharakan
2	"Karumpanaanu Kannan"	Baby Sreeram	Ramesan Nair
