= Biyon =

Indian actor

- Born: Byon V. K. 17 June 1982 (age 44); Kozhikode, Kerala, India
- Other name: Biyon
- Education: University of Calicut
- Occupation: Actor
- Years active: 1989–present
- Spouse: Mintu E. K.
- Website: www.facebook.com/ByonVK

Byon V. K. (born 17 June 1982), professionally credited as Biyon, is an Indian actor who works in Malayalam cinema.

== Early life and family ==
Biyon was born in Kozhikode to Sivasankar VK and Beena K. Byon Completed his schooling at Presentation High School and Hill Top Public School. He completed his Pre-Degree course at St. Joseph's College, Devagiri.

Biyon completed his bachelor's degree and masters in commerce at NSS College, Calicut. He always found time to pursue his passion, acting, even while he was busy with school work. Biyon is also interested in photography. His other hobbies include traveling and trekking to some adventurous places and is very much interested in long drives.

On 20 March 2011, Biyon married Mintu EK.

=== Film career ===
Biyon made his debut in 1989 in the film Oru Vadakkan Veeragatha directed by Hariharan as a child artist. Biyon was fortunate enough to start his acting career with one of the most famous film directors in Malayalam, Hariharan in 1989. He has completed over fifty films.

Biyon has also starred in a few English, Tamil, and Kannada films.

== Filmography ==
=== Malayalam movies ===
Year	Title	Role
1989	Oru Vadakkan Veeragatha	Young Chandu
1990	Money Order	
1991	Bharatham	Young Gopinathan
1991	Kakka Thollayiram	
1991	Sandhesam	S.I Anandan's son
1991	Kadavu	Appuni
1992	Eeazhara Ponnana	
1992	Sooryamanasam	
1992	Thalastaanam	Young Unnikrishnan
1992	Mahanagaram	
1992	Kallanum Polisum	
1993	Sthalathe Pradhana Payyans	
1993	Ente Sreekuttikku	
1993	Koushalam	
1993	Yaadhavam	
1994	Rudraksham	
1995	Tom & Jerry	
1995	Vrudhanmare Sookshikkuka	
1996	Nandagopalante Kusruthikal	
1996	Mahaatma	
1997	Kudamaattam	
1997	Janathipathyam	
1999	Aayiram Meni	
2000	Valyettan	Young Madhavanunni
2000	Thenkasipattanam	
2002	Kayyethum Doorath	
2003	Chronic Bachelor	Young Sathyaprathapan
2005	Thaskara Veeran	
2006	Enittum	
2006	Pachakkuthira	
2006	Jayam	Kiran
2007	Flash	
2007	Abraham Lincoln	
2008	Thirakkatha	
2009	Red Chillies	Ricky
2009	Vairam	
2010	Holidays	
2011	Mohabhatt	
2011	The Metro	Gopan
2011	Doctor Love	
2012	Last Bench	
2012	Banking Hours 10 to 4	
2012	Manthrikan	
2012	Orkut Oru Ormakoot	
2013	Ithu Manthramo Thanthramo Kuthanthramo	
2013	Good Idea	
2013	Kunthapura	
2013	Mizhi	
2013	English: An Autumn in London	
2014	@Andheri	
2014	To Noora with Love	
2014	Parankimala	Appu
2015	1000 – Oru Note Paranja Katha	
2015	Oru New Generation Pani	
2015	Uthara Chemeen	
2016	Pretham	
2019	Thenkasikkaattu	

=== Other languages ===
Year	Title	Role	Language
2002	Thenkasippattanam		Tamil
2003	50 50		Kannada
2011	Kunthapura		Kannada
2016	Pudhusa Naan Poranthen		Tamil

== Other works ==
Short film

- 69 - Oru Thala Thirinja Katha

Serial

- Orma(Asianet)

Reality show

- Dance Kerala Dance (Zee Keralam) as mentor
