= Baba Kalyani (film) =

2006 Indian film

- Theatrical release poster
- Directed by: Shaji Kailas
- Written by: S. N. Swami
- Produced by: Antony Perumbavoor
- Starring: Mohanlal
- Cinematography: Shaji Kumar
- Edited by: Don Max
- Music by: Alex Paul, Rajamani (Score)
- Production company: Aashirvad Cinemas
- Distributed by: Central Pictures
- Release date: 15 December 2006
- Country: India
- Language: Malayalam

Baba Kalyani is a 2006 Indian Malayalam-language action thriller film directed by Shaji Kailas, written by S. N. Swami, and produced by Antony Perumbavoor through Aashirvad Cinemas. It stars Mohanlal in the title role, and also features an ensemble cast featuring Biju Menon and Indrajith Sukumaran in important roles. The film's music was composed by Alex Paul.

Baba Kalyani was released on 15 December 2006, where it became one of the top highest-grossing Malayalam films of the year.

== Plot ==
Following a tip from a small-time lodge owner, the ATS conducts a search at the rooms where a group of suspicious youths stayed. Baba Kalyani IPS, the head of ATS M3-division finds certain clues, which he wants to follow. With the permission from IG Bose Ninan, Baba Kalyani arrives in Kochi, and is posted in the Law and order department with Thomas and a couple of ATS officers assisting him. At Kochi, Kalyani clashes with Adv. Ashokan and his daughter Madhumitha, who was his ex-girlfriend. A bundle of counterfeit currency is found at a local bank, which was transferred from the account of a charity organization run by Sait Issa Mohammed Haji, a respected businessman.

Baba Kalyani reaches the residence of Issa Mohammed on the same night, where Issa denies any knowledge about any hawala dealings in the state. The cash was transferred from the account by Issa Mohammed's son-in-law Babu, who is a college lecturer and a leader of a terror organization in the state. He is with a bunch of young men who had secretly undergone Jihad training in Pakistan and is planning a massive explosion. Unaware of this, Issa supports him thinking Babu is a normal college lecturer busy with his own life. One morning, Issa arrives at Baba Kalyani's residence, informing about a group of suspicious young men recently seen at the nearby mosque. He also adds that the Muslyar of the mosque has some doubts regarding their activities.

Along with Thomas and their group, Baba Kalyani conducts a raid at the house and gathers vital information. The house gets blown up, signing the storage of inflammable explosives. From the prints, maps and photographs, Baba Kalyani concludes that their next target is Palani, a divine pilgrimage center in South India. He arrives at Palani along with his team, where he meets up Tamil Nadu IG Raghupathi. With the support of local cops, Baba seizes the trucks in which the explosives were stored, where he sends Issa Mohammed as a negotiator to Babu who was hiding along with the jihadis. Unwilling to give up the plan, Babu decides to shoot down Issa. The ATS team conducts a commando operation and shoots down the jihadis, including Babu, thus aborting their plan. Baba patches up with Madhumitha, where they happily get married.

== Cast ==
- Mohanlal as ACP Baba Kalyani IPS, Assistant Commissioner of Anti Terrorist Squad
- Indrajith Sukumaran as Zaheer Ahmed / Babu (main antagonist)
- Biju Menon as CI Thomas, ATS officer
- Siddique as DIG Raghupathi IPS, Tamil Nadu Police
- Sai Kumar as Issa Mohammed Haji
- Jagathy Sreekumar as SI Ramanan
- Mamta Mohandas as Adv. Madhumitha
- Ajay Jose as CI Firoze
- Venu Nagavally as DIG Bose K. Nianan IPS
- Murali as Arackal Ashokan
- Kaviyoor Ponnamma as Meenakshiyamma
- Maya Moushmi as Ammini, Thomas's wife
- Reshmi Boban as Babu's wife
- Innocent as Parandan Devassy
- Shammi Thilakan as Adv. Dineshan
- Maniyanpilla Raju as SI Sundaram
- Saiju Kurup as Tahir, terrorist
- Anil Murali as Yousuf
- Kiran Raj as Khader, Terrorist
- Bindu Panicker as Mayor
- Vineeth Kumar as Santhosh
- Sadiq as Murali, lodge owner
- T. P. Madhavan as Prabhakaran
- Prem Prakash as DGP Sathyasheelan IPS
- P. Sreekumar as MLA Jayakumar
- Chali Pala as SP Shivasankaran IPS
- Biju Pappan as CI Sarath
- Narayanankutty as Mohan, police Constable
- DYSP Rajkumar Rajasekhar as Sub Inspector
- Ambika Mohan as Women's Commission member
- Ponnamma Babu as Women's Commission member
- Rema Devi as Women's Commission member
- Bindu Murali as Bose K. Ninan's wife
- Joju George
- Shivani Bhai as Suspect
- Anoop Chandran as Hassan

== Production ==
Shaji Kailas was supposed to direct another film with Mohanlal in the lead role. But due to several reasons, the film did not start production and he asked S. N. Swami to do a script on urgent basis. The only song was written by Vayalar Sarath Chandra Varma and was composed by Alex Paul.

== Soundtrack ==
Baba Kalyan

Soundtrack album by Alex Paul
- Recorded: 2006
- Genre: Feature film soundtrack
- Length: 13:50
- Labels: M.C. Audios & Videos

The soundtrack for this movie was composed by Alex Paul while the lyrics were written by Sharath Vayalar.

Track list
| No. | Title | Artist(s) | Length |
|---|---|---|---|
| 1. | "Dhana Chananana (Bit)" |
| 2. | "Kai Niraye Vennatharam (M)" | G Venugopal | 4:45 |
| 3. | "Kai Niraye Vennatharam (F)" | Manjari | 4:25 |
| 4. | "Neelamizhi Peelikale" | Jyotsna Radhakrishnan, Vidhu Prathap | 4:40 |
| Total length: | | | 13:50 |

== Box office ==
The film was released in 61 screens in 48 stations in Kerala. It took a good opening and grossed ₹1.08 crore (US$110,000) in three days, with a distributors share of ₹54 lakh (US$56,000). Baba Kalyani became one of the top ten highest-grossing Malayalam films of the year, in terms of the box office earnings and the cost of production.
