= X:IN =

Multinational girl group

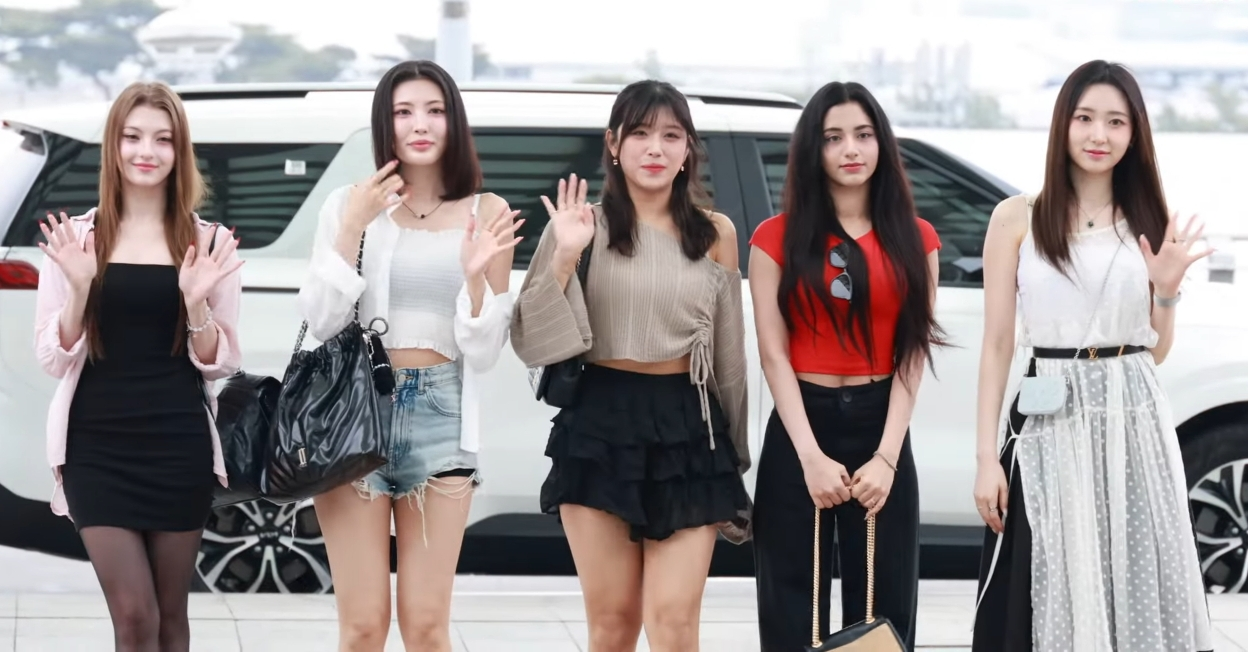
- X:IN in May 2024; From L-R: Nova, Nizz, E.sha, Aria and Hannah

Background information
- Origin: Seoul, South Korea
- Genres: K-pop; Hip-hop; EDM
- Years active: 2023–present
- Labels: BeBy Entertainment; 4KI Production
- Members: E.sha; Nizz; Hannah; Aria; Nova
- Past members: Chi.U; Roa
- Website: Official website

X:IN (Korean: 엑신; RR: Eksin; stylized in all caps) is a multinational girl group based in South Korea. Managed by BeBy Entertainment, the group consists of five members: E.sha, Nizz, Nova, Hannah and Aria. They made their debut on April 11, 2023, with single "Keeping the Fire".

== Name ==
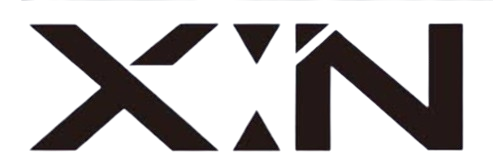
Official Logo of X:IN

X:IN, the stylized form of EXIN, is derived from a Latin word meaning, furthermore, where "X" symbolizes an unknown variable, a concept used in mathematics, representing the group's aim to explore limitless possibilities in music and performance.

== History ==
=== Pre-debut activities ===
E.sha, had participated in several pre-debut groups, including MEP-C, Laonzena, and trained under GBK Entertainment. She chose the stage name E.sha as part of her new career chapter and is recognized for her dance abilities and choreographing her group's songs.

Nova, was part of the Russian dance cover team Dalcom, where she performed K-pop dance covers. She also worked as a voice actress, dubbing characters in Russian. Nova joined Escrow Entertainment through online auditions and underwent only four months of training before debuting.

Aria, born as Gauthami, is a former Indian child actress who appeared in Malayalam movies such as Melvilasom and Thank You. Like Nova, she joined Escrow Entertainment through online auditions.

Chi.U, made her solo debut in November 2021 and was a member of the dance team Majesty. Additionally, she appeared in episode two of Dreamcatcher's Why Not Me. After leaving X:IN, she made her debut in girl group I:MOND.

=== 2023–2024: Debut with Keeping the Fire, line-up changes, Synchronicity, The Real, Seoul-Moskva and Acha(%) ===
On March 15, 2023, they made their first appearance on an online broadcast show K-stage, where they performed their pre-debut song "Who Am I" and later released its performance video on YouTube.

They made their debut on April 11, 2023, under Escrow Entertainment as a five-member group composed of Roa, E.sha, Chi.U, Nova and Aria, with digital single "Keeping the Fire" under Escrow Entertainment and performed it on various music programs.

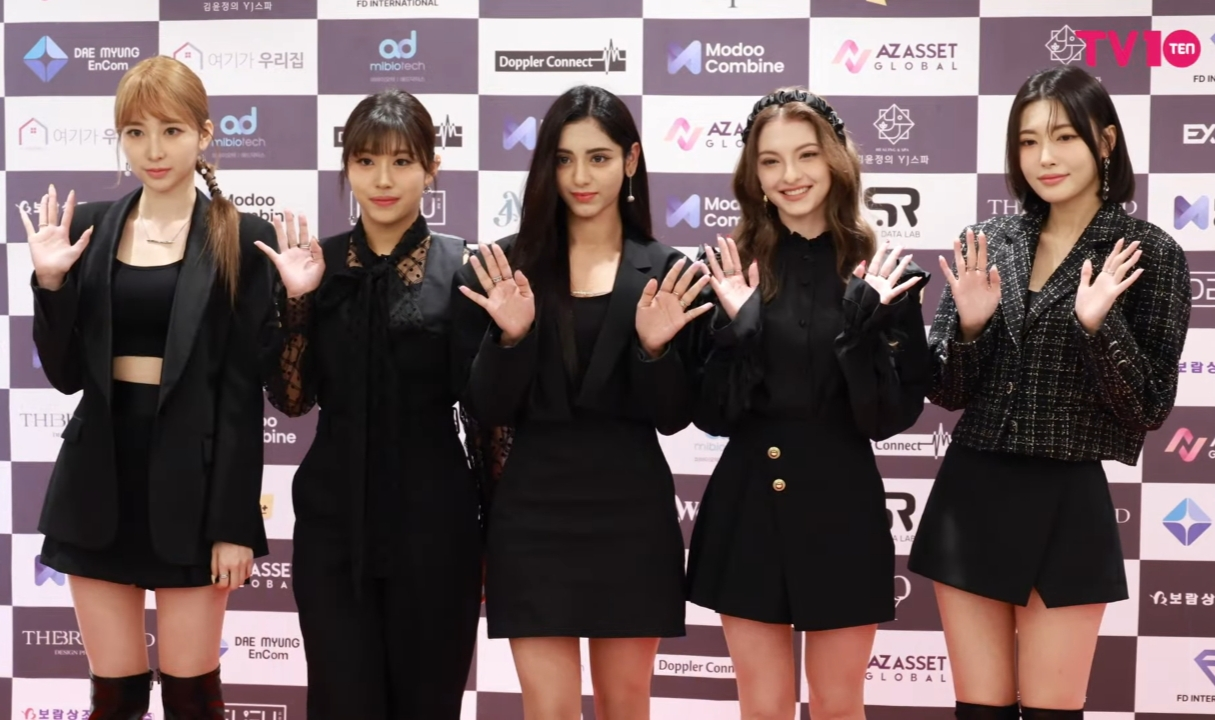
New lineup of X:IN

Due to personal circumstances, Chi.U left in June 2023, followed by Roa in July 2023. In July 2023, the company introduced two new Korean members, Nizz and Hannah.

On August 5, 2023, Escrow Entertainment released a poster announcing the release of their first extended play album titled Synchronicity, released on August 30, 2023. The album features a blend of pop and dance genres, with "Synchronize" serving as the title track..

On February 5, 2024, X:IN announced their second extended play through releasing a poster, The Real, which was officially released on February 25, 2024, under Escrow Entertainment. The album features four tracks, with title track "NO DOUBT" filmed in Cebu, Philippines. Prior to the album's release, the group dropped the pre-release single "My Idol" on February 19, 2024. The album was described by leader E.Sha as a reflection of the member's personal experiences, capturing their emotions and struggles on their journey as idols.

In May 2024, they visited Moscow, Russia, where they served as judges at the Asian Dragon Fest, performed a concert, and held a fan signing event. During this visit, they collaborated with Russian artist Anatoly Tsoy, known professionally as TSOY, to record the single "Seoul – Moskva". The song, featuring lyrics in Russian, English, and Korean, was released on October 25, 2024. TSOY expressed excitement about this groundbreaking collaboration, noting that it was the first of its kind between a Russian artist and a K-pop group. He joined X:IN on stage during their second visit to Russia, performing live at their concerts in Moscow on November 2, 2024, and in St. Petersburg on November 3, 2024. This marked the first live performances of their collaboration.

X:IN released their digital single "Acha(%)" on December 13, 2024, which conveys a message about confidently embracing individuality, overcoming obstacles, and letting go of toxic influences while staying true to oneself. This was preceded by the release of "Keeping the Fire Rock Ver." on December 12, 2024.

=== 2025: Departure from Escrow Entertainment, Defend Myself, and Rrrun ===
On April 9, 2025, it was announced via the official platform b.stage that they had terminated their contract with Escrow Entertainment. The group will continue their future activities under the management of a new agency, BeBy Entertainment.

After a year long hiatus, the group confirmed that they are preparing for their comeback which is filmed entirely in Los Angeles, California, USA.

On April 22, 2025, X:IN released concept photos announcing the release of their third extended play album under new agency BeBy Entertainment titled Defend Myself released on May 17, 2025, with title track "Attention seeker" and 3 b-side tracks.

On September 4, 2025, they released their first single album titled Rrrun consisting of title track "Rrrun" and a b-side track "Creamy".

In August, 2025, they participated in the 2025 Chuseok Special of the Idol Star Athletics Championships (ISAC), where Nova won first place in the dance sport category, surpassing Kep1er's Xiaoting.

=== 2026—present: Hyper, Girls on Fire and Chain Reaction ===
On February 20, 2026, they released their fourth extended play, Hyper, with title track "Dazzle Flash" shot in Dubai.

In June 2026, X:IN's agency, BeBy Entertainment, was selected as a beneficiary of the "Global Leap Forward Support" project—an initiative launched by the Ministry of Culture, Sports and Tourism and the Korea Creative Content Agency to support international expansion for small and mid-sized K-pop agencies.

On August 21, 2026, they released their debut Japanese extended play, Girls on Fire in Tokyo.

On October 6, 2026, they are scheduled to release their first studio album, Chain Reaction, an 11-track album exploring themes centered on chemistry and featuring the title track "Zzirit" with Luísa Sonza.

== Members ==
Current

- E.sha (이샤) - leader
- Nizz (니즈)
- Nova (노바)
- Hannah (한나)
- Aria (아리아)

Former

- Roa (로아)
- Chi.U (치유)

== Discography ==
=== Extended plays ===
Title	EP details	Peak chart positions	Sales
Title	EP details	KOR	Sales
Synchronicity	Released: August 30, 2023; Label: Escrow Entertainment; Formats: CD, digital download; Track listing: 1. "Synchronize"; 2. "Close My Eyes" (겁이나); 3. "Cat&Tiger"; 4. "Close My Eyes" (겁이나; Eng ver.); 5. "Synchronize" (inst.)	46	KOR: 1,921
The Real	Released: February 25, 2024; Label: Escrow Entertainment; Formats: CD, digital download; Track listing: 1. "No Doubt"; 2. "My Idol"; 3. "Withdraw"; 4. "Never Sorry"; 5. "No Doubt" (inst.); 6. "My Idol" (inst.); 7. "Withdraw" (inst.); 8. "Never Sorry" (inst.)	51	KOR: 3,062
Defend Myself	Released: May 17, 2025; Label: BeBy Entertainment; Formats: CD, digital download; Track listing: 1. "Attention Seeker"; 2. "Sabaha" (수리수리마하수리 수수리 사바하); 3. "Bitter Love"; 4. "Almost Done"; 5. "Attention Seeker" (inst.); 6. "Sabaha" (수리수리마하수리 수수리 사바하; inst.); 7. "Bitter Love" (inst.); 8. "Almost Done" (inst.)	29	KOR: 2,355

=== Single albums ===
Title	Details	Peak chart positions	Sales
Title	Details	KOR	Sales
Rrrun	Released: September 4, 2025; Label: BeBy Entertainment; Formats: Digital download, streaming; Track listing: 1. "Rrrun"; 2. "Creamy"	82	KOR: 1,691

=== Korean singles ===
==== Singles ====
Title	Year	Album
"Who Am I"	2023	Non-album singles
"Keeping the Fire"	2023	Non-album singles
"Synchronize"	2023	Synchronicity
"No Doubt"	2024	The Real
"Seoul – Moskva" (with TSOY)	2024	Non-album singles
"Acha(%)"	2024	Non-album singles
"Attention seeker"	2025	Defend Myself
"Rrrun"	2025	Rrrun
"Dazzle Flash"	2026	Hyper

=== Japanese singles ===
==== Singles ====
Title	Year	Album
"Girls On Fire" (pre-debut)	2026	Non-album single

== Filmography ==
- X:IN ON&OFF (2023)

== Concerts and Live Performances ==
Event	Date	City	Country	Venue	Source
K-Wave Festival	October 28, 2023	Bengaluru	India	Jayamahal Palace	
Rang de, Korea	December 10, 2023	Delhi	India	Ansal Plaza	
Falcon Festival 2025	December 15, 2025	Umrangso	India	Golf Field	
K-Dream Stage: All India K-Pop Grand Championship 2026	April 20, 2026	Delhi	India	Yashobhoomi	
28th Asian Television Awards	January 12, 2024	Ho Chi Minh City	Vietnam	Hoa Binh Theatre	
Simply K-Pop	February 19, 2024	Seoul	South Korea	Arirang Tower	
X:IN Live in Russia	May 12, 2024	Moscow	Russia	Atmosphere	
SBTown Music Festa	May 26, 2024	Manila	Philippines	Rizal Open Air Auditorium	
X:IN Russian Tour 2024/2025	November 2, 2024	Moscow	Russia	MTS Live Hall	
X:IN Russian Tour 2024/2025	November 3, 2024	Saint Petersburg	Russia	A2	
X:IN Russian Tour 2024/2025	October 15, 2025	Yekaterinburg	Russia	Svoboda	
X:IN Russian Tour 2024/2025	October 17, 2025	Moscow	Russia	Adrenaline Stadium	
X:IN Russian Tour 2024/2025	October 19, 2025	Saint Petersburg	Russia	Sound	
X:IN Russian Tour 2024/2025	October 21, 2025	Novosibirsk	Russia	Podzemka	
X:IN Japan Showcase	October 25–26, 2025	Tokyo	Japan	DDD Aoyama Cross Theater	
X:IN Japan Showcase	October 28–29, 2025	Osaka	Japan	Pluswin Hall Osaka	
X:IN Read Road Tour 2026	October 7, 2026	Yekaterinburg	Russia	Svoboda Concert Hall	
X:IN Read Road Tour 2026	October 8, 2026	Saint Petersburg	Russia	A2	
X:IN Read Road Tour 2026	October 9, 2026	Moscow	Russia	Atmosphere	
