= Aan Piranna Veedu =

- Directed by: K. P. Sunil
- Written by: K. P. Sunil
- Produced by: C. Dilip Kumar
- Starring: Kailash; Aswathy Ashok
- Cinematography: Anandakuttan
- Music by: M. Jayachandran
- Production company: Kumar Productions
- Release date: 15 August 2011
- Country: India
- Language: Malayalam

Aan Piranna Veedu is a Malayalam comedy drama film written and directed by K. P. Sunil. It stars Kailash and Aswathy Ashok in the lead roles, with Innocent, Vinaya Prasad and Suraj Venjaramoodu doing other pivotal roles.

== Cast ==
- Kailash as Jithin
- Aswathy Ashok as Priya
- Innocent as Ramachandran
- Vinaya Prasad as Jithin's mother
- Suraj Venjaramoodu as Albi
- Devan
- Ashokan
- Harishree Ashokan
- Geetha Vijayan
- Ramya Naidu
- Mamukkoya
- Edavela Babu
- Bijukuttan
- Anoop Chandran
- Kochu Preman
- Geetha Salam
- Ponnamma Babu
- Gayathri
- Anjana Appukuttan

== Production ==
The filming is being completed at various parts of Kozhikode.

== Soundtrack ==
The soundtrack of the film has been composed by M. Jayachandran with lyrics by Kaithapram. Madhu Balakrishnan, Sudheep Kumar, Swetha Mohan and Vijay Yesudas are the featured artists. The album is set to release in May 2011.
