= St. Joseph's School, Trichy =

St. Joseph's School
- Trichy, Tamil Nadu; India

Information
- Type: Government aided school
- Motto: Excelsior
- Established: 1 April 1862; 164 years ago

St. Joseph's Anglo Indian Girls Higher Secondary School is a government aided school in Trichy, Tamil Nadu, run by the sisters of the cross of Chavanod (Holy Cross) . The motto of the school is "Excelsior" – aim higher and higher. It is one of the Anglo-Indian schools in Tamil Nadu and one of the most coveted institutions in the district.

== Overview ==
This school is one of the convent schools in Tamil Nadu, India. Convent . The school follows Anglo-Indian Board of education accreditation system (currently the Tamil Nadu State Board) from K-10, with the Higher secondary education automatically rolled over to Tamil Nadu State Board.

== History ==
The forerunner of the St. Joseph's Convent schools was St. Ann’s Convent Schools which the bishop established with the help of the sisters of St. Joseph of the apparition from France. On 1 April 1862 he opened St. Joseph’s Convent School, an English Medium School for girls, the first of its kind in the Malabar region. Mother Claudine Echernier was the force behind establishing the school. Mother Veronica of the Passion who was an English Anglican convert and a sister of St. Joseph of the Apparition was the superior of the convent and headmistress of the school. After Independence the school was designated as an Anglo-Indian School.

== Notable people ==
- Vanitha Rangaraju Advanced Technical Oscar winner for Animation
- Anu Haasan Actress and Television Host
- Roshini Singer and Television anchor
- Roma Asrani Actress and Television
