= Puthiya Mugham =

2009 film by Diphan

- Theatrical release poster
- Directed by: Diphan
- Written by: M. Sindhuraj
- Produced by: Anil Mathew; S. Murugan
- Starring: Prithviraj; Bala; Priyamani; Meera Nandan
- Cinematography: Bharani K. Dharan
- Edited by: Samjith Mohammed
- Music by: Deepak Dev
- Production company: Bethestha Productions
- Distributed by: Time Ads Release
- Release date: 24 July 2009
- Running time: 137 minutes
- Country: India
- Language: Malayalam

Puthiya Mugham (Note: Spelt as Puthiya Mughom on the CBFC certificate.) (transl. New face) is a 2009 Indian Malayalam-language action thriller film directed by Diphan and written by M. Sindhuraj. The film stars Prithviraj Sukumaran, Bala and Priyamani. The music was composed by Deepak Dev, with cinematography and editing done by Bharani K. Dharan and Samjith Mohammed.

Puthiya Mugham was a major commercial success at the box office and was noted for making Prithviraj Sukumaran a superstar in Malayalam cinema. It was remade in Kannada as Ziddi (2013), while the film was dubbed in Tamil with the same name and in Telugu as Yama Mudhuru.

== Plot ==
Krishnakumar alias Kichu, a resident of an agraharam in Kalpathy, pursues a career as a percussionist and teaches the mridangam to local students. Kichu is in love with Sreedevi, the daughter of a family friend, and their relationship is supported by both families. Kichu moves to the city of Kochi to enroll in an engineering college. Sudhi, a senior student and the younger brother of gangsters Mahi and Giri, looks after his brothers' crime dealings and, in turn, his brothers support all his endeavours on the campus. Anjana, who is SI Shivaraman's daughter, joins the engineering college and Sudhi falls in love with her.

Sudhi tries to win her love by concealing and temporarily stopping all his illegal activities. Meanwhile, Kichu has won the heart of everyone at the campus. Sudhi suspects that Anjana is attracted to Kichu and sends his brothers with a marriage proposal to Anjana's family. They accept the proposal and force the reluctant Anjana to agree. However, Anjana stipulates a condition that Sudhi would have to wait for 4 years for the marriage and Anjana will have freedom for these 4 years. The freedom of Anjana and the way she exercises it makes Sudhi jealous and suspicious. Sudhi wants to scare Kichu out of the college and arranges an attack on him at the college hostel.

Kichu apparently receives a blow to the head and attacks his own friend, who tried to rescue him. Kichu is admitted to a hospital and a doctor reveals that Kichu is suffering from a flashback phenomenon. When Kichu was young, he had witnessed the death of his younger brother, who was hit by a bus and traumatic incidents like this will turn him violent. Following this, Sreedevi's family disapproves of the marriage and his own family does not want him to go to college anymore, but his father urges him to go back and achieve something in life. Kichu arrives back at college, where he thrashes up Sudhi and his friends. Sudhi's brothers turn in for help, but Kichu mortally wounds Mahi and sends him into coma.

Policeman Shivaraman, who is in cahoots with Mahi and Giri, arrests Kichu and takes him to the police station. Kichu learns that he is going to be transported to the sub-jail, where his execution is planned. Kichu turns violent and storms the police station, where he gets hit by a policeman and apparently falls unconscious, but is only a ruse. Kichu is rushed to the hospital, where he escapes from the police. Sudhi kidnaps Anjana and a final showdown ensues at an abandoned construction site. A heated argument and close-combat ensue, which lead to Sudhi's death and Kichu walks away with Anjana, who has now fallen for Kichu.

== Cast ==
- Prithviraj Sukumaran as Krishna Kumar "Kichu"
  - Bharath Satheeshan as Young Kichu
- Bala as Sudhir "Sudhi"
- Priyamani as Anjana Shivaraman (voiceover by Devi S.)
- Sudheesh as Varghese
- Vishnupriyan as Venki
- Jagathy Sreekumar as Fr. Peter Thekkan
- Nedumudi Venu as Ramankutty Iyer
- Shobha Mohan as Savithri
- Meera Nandan as Sreedevi
- Vijayaraghavan as Shivaraman
- Sai Kumar as Mahindran a.k.a. Mahi, Sudhi's eldest brother
- Shammi Thilakan as Giridharan "Giri", Sudhi's elder brother
- Jagadish as Harishankar
- Sona Nair as Vanaja
- Guinness Pakru as Canteen Rajan
- Jaffar Idukki as Canteen Suni
- Thara Kalyan as Anjana's aunt
- Manka Mahesh as Bharathi, Anjana's mother
- Kalaranjini as Mahi's wife
- Kalashala Babu as Sreenivasan
- Anil Murali as Sandeep, Sreedevi's brother
- Oviya as Meera
- Seema G. Nair as Sudhi's kin
- Chali Pala as Ex-MLA Vishwambaran
- Dinesh Panicker as Doctor Shanavas
- Surabhi Lakshmi as Rohini
- Joy John Antony as Kuruvila

== Soundtrack ==
Puthiya Mugham: Original Motion Picture Soundtrack

Soundtrack album to Puthiya Mugham by Deepak Dev
- Released: 24 July 2009
- Recorded: 2009
- Studios: Lal Media, Kochi; Stickers & Crew Films
- Genre: Feature film soundtrack
- Length: 26:30
- Language: Malayalam
- Label: Satyam Audios
- Producer: Deepak Dev

Deepak Dev chronology
Sadhu Miranda (2008)	Puthiya Mugham: Original Motion Picture Soundtrack (2009)	Drona 2010 (2010)
External audio
- Video Song on YouTube
- Audio Jukebox (Satyam Audios) on YouTube

Singles from Puthiya Mugham
- 1. "Picha Vacha Naal" Released: 24 July 2009; 2. "Kaane Kaane" Released: 24 July 2009; 3. "Rahasyamaay" Released: 24 July 2009

The music was composed by Deepak Dev, with lyrics written by Kaithapram. The album features five tracks released on 24 July 2009 by Satyam Audios. Prithviraj made his debut as a playback singer through this film.

Track listing
No.	Title	Singer(s)	Length
1.	"Kaane Kaane" (Title song)	Prithviraj	3:20
2.	"Picha Vacha Naal"	Shankar Mahadevan	4:31
3.	"Rahasyamaay"	KK, Shilpa Rao	5:01
4.	"Thattum Muttum"	Jassie Gift, Sindhu Rajaram, Deepak Dev	5:12
5.	"Yadukula Murali"	Dr. Krishna Kumar	5:14
6.	"Sweety Pie Darling"	SuVi, Prithviraj	3:12
Total length:			26:30

== Reception ==
=== Critical response ===
Paresh C Palicha of Rediff gave 2/5 stars and wrote "Director Diphan's effort to present a new face of Prithviraj does not work because of the over dependence on violence."

=== Box office ===
Puthiya Mugham became a commercial success at the box office and also heightened Prithviraj to superstardom in Malayalam cinema.

== Awards ==
Shankar Mahadevan won the award of Best Singer at the Annual Malayalam Movie Awards. At the 2009 Asianet Film Awards, Deepak Dev received the award of Best Music Director for his songs in the film, while Shankar Mahadevan won the award of Best Male Playback Singer.
