= Roma Asrani =

Indian actress

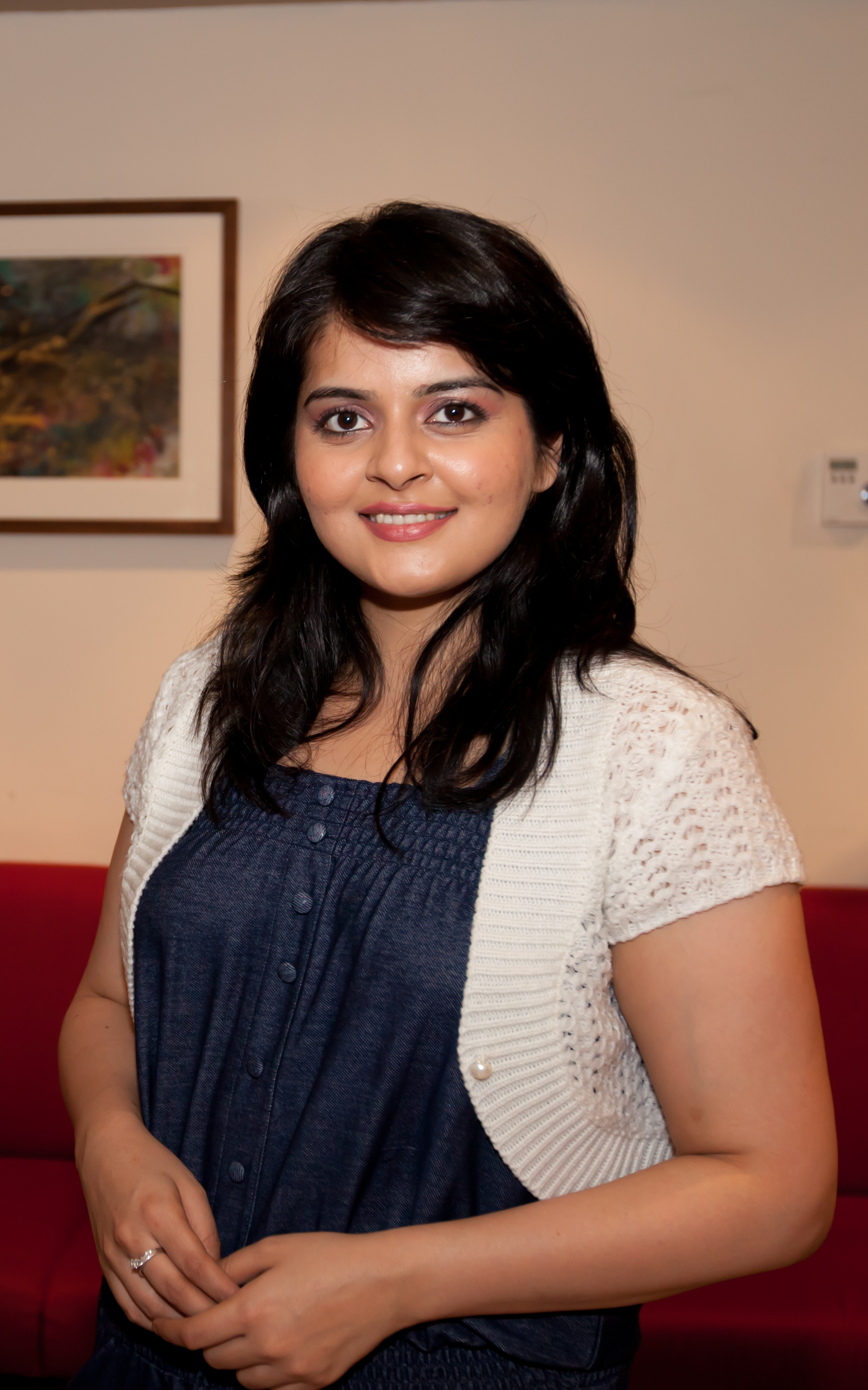
- Born: Roma Asrani; August 25, 1984 (41); Tiruchirappalli, Tamil Nadu, India
- Occupations: Actress, Model
- Years active: 2006-2017; 2026

Roma Asrani is an Indian actress who mainly appeared in Malayalam films. Her career peaked between 2006 and 2011. She has acted in over 25 movies.

== Early life and career ==
Roma was born as Roma Asrani in Tiruchirappalli, Tamil Nadu, into a Sindhi family. Her family has its roots in Delhi, and her parents were engaged in wholesale jewellery business. She was educated at St. Joseph's Anglo-Indian School, Trichy. She later earned a bachelor's degree in Commerce.

Roma made her debut in Telugu film Mr. Errababu in 2005. Her first film in Malayalam was Notebook (2006), directed by Rosshan Andrrews. Her second film was July 4 (2007), directed by Joshiy. Her third film Chocolate (2007) which she starred alongside Prithviraj Sukumaran was successful. She has also acted in a music video with Vineeth Sreenivasan.

== Filmography ==
Key
†	Denotes films that have not yet been released

Year	Title	Role	Language	Notes
2005	Mr. Errababu	Pooja	Telugu	
2006	Kadhale En Kadhale	Krithika	Tamil	
2006	Notebook	Dr.Sara Elizabeth(Sara)	Malayalam	Voiceover by Sreeja Ravi
2007	July 4	Sreepriya (Priya)	Malayalam	Voiceover by Sreeja Ravi
2007	Chocolate	Ann Mathews (Ann/Annamma)	Malayalam	Voiceover by Sreeja Ravi
2008	Shakespeare M.A. Malayalam	Alli	Malayalam	
2008	Aramane	Geetha	Kannada	
2008	Minnaminnikoottam	Rose Mary (Rosu)	Malayalam	Voiceover by Sreeja Ravi
2008	Twenty Twenty	Sara	Malayalam	Photo-presence
2008	LollyPop	Jennifer (Jenny)	Malayalam	Voiceover by Sreeja Ravi
2009	Colours	Pinky	Malayalam	Voiceover by Angel Shijoy
2009	Utharaswayamvaram	Uthara	Malayalam	
2010	Chalaki	Subbalakshmi	Telugu	
2011	Kadhayile Nayika	Archana	Malayalam	
2011	Traffic	Mariam	Malayalam	
2011	Mohabbat	Herself	Malayalam	Special appearance
2011	1993 Bombay, March 12	Abida	Malayalam	
2011	Chappa Kurishu	Ann	Malayalam	
2011	Doubles	Herself	Malayalam	Cameo appearance
2012	Casanovva	Ann Mary	Malayalam	
2012	Grandmaster	Beena	Malayalam	
2012	Face to Face	Dr. Uma	Malayalam	
2015	Namasthe Bali	Annamma	Malayalam	
2017	Sathya	Rosy	Malayalam	
2026	Velleppam	Sara	Malayalam	Delayed release Shot in 2019

=== Music videos ===
Title	Song	Director	Music	Notes
Malayalee	''Minnalazhake''	Vineeth Sreenivasan	Jakes Bejoy	
Born In Kerala	''Arennile''	Arun Sekhar; Gireesh Nair; Sandya Sekhar	Jakes Bejoy	

== Television ==
- 2007. Super Dancer Junior (Amrita TV) as Judge
- 2013. Sundari niyum sundaran njnanum (Asianet) as Judge
- 2015. Badai Bungalow as Guest
- 2015-2017 . Comedy stars season 2 (Asianet) as Judge
- 2017 .Lal Salam (Amrita TV) as Dancer
