= List of awards and honours received by Chembai =

This is a list of awards and honours that Chembai Vaidyanatha Bhagavatar received in recognition of his music.

== Sangeetha Samrat (1935) ==
The people of Trichy held Chembai in special esteem. In 1935, when he was invited to perform there, they had decided to honour him with a title, under the leadership of Kalki Krishnamurthy. Swami Sivananda who was then camping at Trichy, was invited to honour Chembai and bestow the title of Sangeeta Samrat (Emperor of Music) on him.

== Honours from Mysore Maharaja (1937) ==
Chembai visited Mysore at the invitation of Krishnarajendra Wodeyar, its then Maharaja, and gave a command performance there. But he declined another invitation that followed, to serve as an asthana vidwan of the Mysore Royal Court, since he felt he would not be able to stay in Mysore for the entire duration of Navaratri since he was conducting an annual Navaratri music festival in his own village (Chembai). Far from being offended, the Maharaja appreciated his sense of priorities, and rewarded him for his sincerity.

== Gayana Gandharva (1940) ==
His popular recognition found further expression in 1940 when his old friend T.D. Narayana Iyer, about to retire as a senior postal official, arranged a function to raise funds for the War effort and for activities promoting the welfare of the employees of the postal department. He decided to invite Chembai to give a performance on the occasion and to honour Muthiah Bhagavatar. Bhagavatar presided over the function, of which the highlight was the awarding of the title of Gayana Gandharva ("musician among musicians") to Chembai.

== Sangeetha Kalanidhi (1951) ==
The recognition most coveted by Carnatic musicians is the invitation to preside over the annual conference of the Music Academy of Madras. The title of Sangeetha Kalanidhi goes to the person presiding over the conference.

Chembai Vaidyanatha Bhagavatar received the invitation and the title in 1951. In his presidential address, he said:
“Music has an individual, innate beauty, different from other fine arts. Originating in the air, it dissolves into the air, giving 'Nirguna brahmam' - which fills all space - the form of 'Nada brahmam'. Practice of music is, therefore, worship of `Nirgunabrahmam', and sangita is a yoga by itself. ... I have no doubt that the art and practice of Carnatic music will flourish and grow with good cooperation between vidwans and rasikas.

== Sangeet Natak Akademi Award (1958) ==
Chembai received the 'Sangeet Natak Akademi Award' in 1958, from the President of India Dr. S.Radhakrishnan, at Delhi before an invited audience of eminent Hindustani and Carnatic musicians and rasikas. This was a national recognition for his fame. He had come to be called the Bade Ghulam Ali Khan of South India.

== Suvarna Mudra ==
The Suvarna Mudra (gold medal) was awarded by Kerala Kalamandalam (a well-known institution of arts) to Chembai in recognition of his fame as the best known Indian musician from Kerala.

== Padma Bhushan (1973) ==
The Padma Bhushan is a national award bestowed by the President of India on select musicians and other eminent people. Chembai was selected to receive the award in 1973 from the then president V. V. Giri.

== Other titles ==
- Sangeetha Pracheena Paddhati Paripalaka
- Sangeetha Bheeshmachar
- Abhinava Tyagabrahma
- Guruvayoorappa Dasar

== Honours from other princely states ==
Honours were also bestowed on him by the rulers of Cochin, Baroda, Vijayanagaram, Bobbili and Jaipur.

== Postage stamp ==
The Department of Posts, Govt of India released a special issue Chembai Stamp on Chembai's birth centenary year (1996).

== Chembai Memorial Govt. Music College ==
The Kerala Govt named a music college after Chembai to honour him. This college celebrates its golden jubilee in 2007.

== See also ==
- Chembai Vaidyanatha Bhagavatar
- Carnatic Music
- South India
- Kerala
