= Thank You (2013 film) =

- Directed by: V. K. Prakash
- Written by: Arunlal Ramachandran
- Produced by: Shahul Hammeed Marikar
- Starring: Jayasurya; Honey Rose; Sethu
- Cinematography: Arvind Krishna
- Edited by: Babu Rathnam Uthara
- Music by: Bijibal
- Production company: Marikar Films
- Release date: 14 June 2013
- Running time: 103 minutes
- Country: India
- Language: Malayalam

Thank You is a 2013 Malayalam drama thriller film written by Arunlal Ramachandran and directed by V. K. Prakash. The firm stars Jayasurya, Honey Rose and Sethu and is produced by Shahul Hameed Marikar. Thank You was produced under the banner of Marikar Films and features music composed by Bijibal. The film's cinematography was led by Arvind Krishna and edited by Babu Rathnam. Although the film earned back its revenue from satellite rights, it did not perform well in theatres.

== Plot ==
The film is shown to be a reflection of the current socio-political system, based on the violence against women. It revolves around a person who arrives in Trivandrum city who takes a ride from place to place in an Autorickshaw. His name or whereabouts are not revealed, and he just travels from place to place in the auto rickshaw. The questions about his whereabouts form the rest of the story.

== Cast ==
- Jayasurya as Movie Writer
- Honey Rose as Remya
- Sethu as Dev Menon
- Kailash as Shankar
- Abi
- Tini Tom as Sugunan
- Jubil Rajan P Dev
- Mukundan
- Sudheer Karamana as Thief
- P. Balachandran as Balettan
- Aishwarya Devan as Sruthi
- Mridul as Gopan
- Saiju Kurup as Arun
- Anuja Krishnan as Reporter
- Gauthami (Aria of X:IN) as Arun's daughter

== Production ==
=== Development ===
Thank You kicked off a series of eight films by the production firm Marikar Films that also includes the Mollywood debut of directors Gautham Vasudev Menon and Thiru. According to Ramachandran, the project took shape quickly. The script writer discussed the idea with actor Jayasurya on the set of Mumbai Police and the actor asked him to approach the director V. K. Prakash, who requested a complete script as soon as possible. Jayasurya called it "a gem of a script."

=== Casting ===
Jayasurya was cast by the script writer first. Honey Rose, who had been in the director's previous film, Trivandrum Lodge, was cast. Jayasurya was cast in the role as a modern wife. Remya Nambeesan was considered for a prominent role, but was not cast. Actor Sethu who played the role of police officer Bhaskar in the Tamil film Mynaa was cast to play one of the lead roles in the film. There were rumours of Sunny Wayne being cast. He was at the time a rising actor, but was ultimately not cast for a role. Tini Tom was cast to play a police officer, after being part of the director V. K. Prakash's 2011 film, Beautiful. Other members of the cast that were announced included Kailash, Mukundan, Balachandran and Aishwarya Devan. The actress Aishwarya was also cast, she made her debut in Tamil Films with Yuvan. Aishwarya Devan plays a reporter in the film.

=== Filming ===
The puja of Thank You and seven other films by Marikar Films was conducted on 9 April 2013. Principal photography began on 11 April 2013 at Trivandrum in the residential area Chackai.
