= Chali Pala =

Indian actor

- Born: Thiruvananthapuram, Kerala, India
- Occupation: Actor
- Years active: 1990-present

Chalil Babykkuttan better known as Chali Pala is an Indian actor who appears in Malayalam films. He is most known for playing supporting roles in Malayalam films.

== Biography ==
Pala was born in Thiruvananthapuram. He debuted with the film Iyer the Great in 1990.

== Partial filmography ==
Year	Title	Role	Notes
1990	Iyer the Great		
1995	Spadikam	Lukachan	
1997	Bhoothakkannadi	Chacko	
1997	Nee Varuvolam		
1997	Lelam	Champakuzhi Jose	
1998	Meenakshi Kalyanam	Gopinathan Nair	
1998	Sooryavanam	Vikraman	
1999	Pathram	ASI Parameswara Kurup	
1999	Olympian Anthony Adam	Circle Inspector Ummerkutty	
1999	F.I.R		
2000	The Gang	Sub Inspector	
2000	Pilots		
2002	Bheri		
2003	The King Maker Leader		
2004	Vellinakshathram		
2005	The Tiger		
2005	Iruvattam Manavaatti		
2006	Rashtram	Vincent	
2006	Jayam		
2006	Baba Kalyani	SP Shivasankaran	
2007	Kichamani MBA	Chandrapalli Chakrapaani	
2007	Black Cat	Adv. Krishnamoorthy	
2007	Nasrani		
2008	Sound of Boot	Driver Peter	
2008	Pachamarathanalil		
2008	Parthan Kanda Paralokam	Police Officer	
2008	Ayudham		
2008	Mulla		
2008	Shambu		
2009	Orkkuka Vallappozhum		
2009	Gulumaal: The Escape		
2009	Robin Hood	Police Officer Sukumaran	
2009	2 Harihar Nagar	Hotel Manager Vishwanathan Kurup	
2009	Malayali	Shakthivel	
2009	Pramukhan		
2009	Puthiya Mukham	Ex-MLA Vishwambaran	
2009	Black Dalia	DYSP Ramachandran Kurup	
2009	Kana Kanmani	Ouseppachan	
2009	Evidam Swargamanu	CI Prabhakaran	
2010	Chekavar		
2010	Pullimaan		
2010	Annarakkannanum Thannalayathu		
2010	Canvas		
2010	Yugapurushan		
2010	Pranchiyettan & the Saint		
2010	The Filmstaar	Varadaraja Chettiyar	
2011	Bhakthajanangalude Sradhaykku		
2011	Orma Mathram		
2011	Manushyamrugam	Prosecution Advocate	
2011	Mohabbath		
2011	Payyans		
2011	Kadhayile Naayika		
2011	Collector	Adv. Habeeb Khan	
2011	Sthalam		
2012	Vaidooryam		
2012	Asuravithu		
2012	No. 66 Madura Bus		
2012	Hero	ACP Thomas Alex IPS	
2012	Sound Thoma		
2012	Chapters		
2012	Cobra		
2013	Nadodimannan	Peelipose	
2013	Mumbai Police	DYSP Karunakaran Menon	
2013	Housefull		
2013	Njaan Anaswaran		
2013	David and Goliath		
2013	Amen	Mathews	
2013	Ladies and Gentleman	Mahendran	
2013	Proprietors: Kammath & Kammath		
2013	Pullipulikalum Aattinkuttiyum	SI George	
2014	Ring Master	Chacko	
2015	Amar Akbar Anthony	Constable Sajeevan	
2016	King Liar	Kalidasan	
2017	Sarvopari Palakkaran	SI Rameshkumar	
2017	Ramaleela	SI Soman	
2018	Panchavarnathatha	Kunjachan	
2019	Ittymaani: Made in China	Kunjachan	
2019	Jack & Daniel	Kunjikannan	
2019	Oru Nalla Kottayamkaaran		
2019	Thrissur Pooram		
2019	Prathi Poovankozhi	Surendran	
2021	Kaattinarike		
2021	Kaaval	Varkey	
2021	Keshu Ee Veedinte Nadhan	Police Inspector Sumesh	
2022	12th Man	Chemmeen Roy	
2022	Oruthee		
2022	Malayankunju		
2022	Kuri		
2022	Paappan	ASI Sathyanath	
2022	Kaduva	Charlie	
2024	Qalb		
2026	Varavu †	TBA	
