= The Dolphins (film) =

- Directed by: Diphan
- Written by: Anoop Menon
- Produced by: M. C. Arun; Sudeep Karakkat
- Starring: Suresh Gopi; Kalpana; Madhu; Anoop Menon; Meghana Raj
- Cinematography: Jithu Damodar
- Edited by: Zian Sreekanth
- Music by: M. Jayachandran
- Production company: Line of Colours
- Release date: 22 November 2014 (Kerala)
- Running time: 135 minutes
- Country: India
- Language: Malayalam

The Dolphins is an 2014 Indian Malayalam-language comedy-drama film directed by Diphan and written by Anoop Menon. It stars Suresh Gopi, Kalpana, Anoop Menon, and Meghana Raj in the lead roles.

== Plot ==
Panayamuttam Sura is a bar owner who wishes to be respected and recognised beyond his liquor baron image in society. An astrologer predicts that he will have a good future if a woman enters his life as a 'luck amplifier.' Though he loves his wife, Sura starts conversing with a new woman. Meanwhile, a murder takes place, which has a bearing on his past.

== Cast ==
- Suresh Gopi as Panayamuttam Sura/Surapalan
- Anoop Menon as Nandan
- Kalpana as Kochuvava Surapalan
- Meghana Raj as Mridula
- Joju George as Cognac Pappinu
- Arun as Saloottan
- Nishanth Sagar as Biju
- Madhu as Achankuttichan
- Nandu as Plamootikada Valthsan
- Irshad as Lalichan
- Nikhil as Chathan Sethu
- Kani Kusruti as Varalakshmi
- Ravi Vallathol
- Mahesh
- Shobi Thilakan
- Saiju Kurup
- Thesni Khan
- Anil Murali
- Suraj Venjaramoodu as George
- Balachandran Chullikkad
- Indrans

== Soundtrack ==
Dolphins

Soundtrack album by M. Jayachandran
- Released: 22 November 2014
- Recorded: 2014
- Genre: Feature film soundtrack
- Producer: M. Jayachandran

The songs are composed by M. Jayachandran. The soundtrack album, which was released in 2014, features two songs overall.

Track	Song	Artist(s)	Lyrics
1	O Mridule	Sudheep !! Sathyan Anthikkadu	
2	En Omale	M. Jayachandran !! Anoop Menon	
