= Namasthe Bali =

- Directed by: K. V. Bejoy
- Screenplay by: Dhinil Babu, Devadas
- Starring: Roma Asrani; Aju Varghese
- Music by: Gopi Sundar
- Release date: 27 February 2015

Namasthe Bali is a 2015 Malayalam language film produced by Minhal Mohammed Ali under the banner of Minhal Productions. The film stars Roma Asrani in the lead role along with Aju Varghese, Devan, Neena Kurup, Balu Varghese and Noby Marcose. The film is directed by K V Bijoy. The music is composed by Gopi Sundar. The screenplay is based on a story written by Dhinil Babu and Devadas. The film was a comeback for Roma to the Malayalam film field after a three year gap. The film is also considered as an unofficial remake of the Bollywood film Queen due to its similar storyline.

== Plot ==
The film is the story of Annamma and Chandy. Both of them from are from very affluent families in Kottayam and Annamma is a nurse by profession. Meanwhile, Chandy feels that Annama is not that modern in her attitude and incites feelings to runaway to escape from the marriage. Chandy elopes after informing his mother that he will be in Bali. On hearing this news Annama sets out to find Chandy in Bali. On reaching Bali, she gets completely lost. She finds some Malayali friends who help her to transform into a party girl from a shy malayalee girl. The film portrays the beauty of Bali and is completely shot in Bali. The story also has a photographer who helps Annamma enjoy her new life in Bali. Later, she finds Chandy and makes him regret his choice of leaving to Bali to escape from the marriage by showing him the transformation she has acquired after coming to Bali.

== Cast ==
- Roma Asrani as Annamma Anto
- Aju Varghese as Chandy Kariya/Chadikunju
- Balu Varghese as Tony
- Devan as Anto Chakkalakyal
- Master Gaurav as Joji Anto
- Noby Marcose as George
- Sunil Sukhada as Kariya Kovathinkal
- Arun V. Narayan as Micle
- Manoj K. Jayan as Sunny
- Neena Kurup as Gracy Anto
- Mini Arun as Clara Kariya
- Kottayam Pradeep
- Sangeetha vijayan as George's Wife

== Songs ==
The music is composed by Gopi Sundar

- "Pichakappo" – Gopi Sunder
- "Tenni Tudichu Vannen" – Gopi Sunder
- "Mutholam Azhakilu Chiriyulla Penne" – Anna Catherine and team
