= SIM (film) =

- Directed by: Diphan
- Written by: Suresh Satheesh
- Produced by: Royson Vellara
- Starring: Ann Augustine; Deepak; Manikandan; Vinod Kovoor
- Music by: Gopi Sunder
- Release date: 19 April 2013
- Running time: 90 minutes
- Country: India
- Language: Malayalam

SIM is a 2013 Malayalam film directed by Diphan, featuring Ann Augustine, Deepak, Manikandan in lead roles. SIM, which is an acronym for "Sorry I am Mad", was produced by Royson Vellara. The film was released on 19 March 2013.

== Plot ==
Insisted by his colleagues, Seetharama Iyer, a villager, joins social media to find the perfect wife for himself. However, his life changes completely after he receives a call from a stranger.

== Cast ==
- Manikandan Pattambi as Seetharama Iyer
- Ann Augustine as Pooja
- Deepak Parambol as Karthik
- Vaigha Rose as Rukmini
- Vinod Kovoor as K.P. Abdullah
- Sukumari as Seetharama Iyer's paatti
- Anoop Chandran as Rameshan
- Colin Paul Mavely
- Praveen Prem as Unni Pillai
- Rehna (Asianet City Girls fame) as Aisha
- Soja Jolly

== Reception ==
Aswin J Kumar from The Times of India gave two stars, writing "What pushes SIM beyond mediocrity is a script ridden with characters whose humour is bland and actions perplexing". Sify wrote "With a rather silly and predictable storyline, stale jokes and pretty ordinary direction, the film make you cringe in your seats right from the beginning". Paresh C Palicha from Rediff gave 1.5 stars wrote "Director Diphan tires to steps out of his comfort zone but fails to deliver a good film in SIM". Veeyen from Nowrunning wrote "SIM directed by Diphan has a message that is best suited for a 3 minute commercial, but which gets elongated beyond imagination into a two hour long humdrum drama".
