= Sathya (2017 Malayalam film) =

- Film poster
- Directed by: Diphan
- Written by: A. K. Sajan
- Produced by: Feroz Saheed
- Starring: Jayaram; Parvathy Nambiar; Roma Asrani; Deepak Jethi; Sudheer Karamana; Rahul Dev; Vinod Kumar Alva
- Cinematography: Bharani K. Dharan
- Edited by: Samjith Mohammed
- Music by: Gopi Sundar
- Production company: Shehnas Movie Creations
- Distributed by: Prathibha Films Release
- Release date: 20 April 2017
- Country: India
- Language: Malayalam

Sathya: Man on The Road is a 2017 Indian Malayalam-language action thriller film written by A. K. Sajan and directed by Diphan. The film stars Jayaram, Roma Asrani, Parvathy Nambiar and Deepak Jethi in the lead roles.

It was released in India on 20 April 2017.

== Plot ==
Sathya a.k.a. Mass Cool is the right-hand man of a casino owner named Don David who offers him money and sends him on a mission to recover a hard disk belonging to his ex-girlfriend, Milan. The hard disk contains some private files from when he was in a relationship with Milan who is threatening him as he is now living a family life with his wife and children. Later, Sathya learns that David is betraying him, that he never had a family, and the money given to him was fake.

Sathya becomes friends with Milan and asks her what was really on the hard disk. Milan reveals that David had taken a loan from her bank manager friend, who later committed suicide as David had no intention of paying it back. However, the manager recorded a private clip of David. Sathya uses the clip to threaten David to make him pay back the loan, and David pays back the loan.

As revenge, David causes a car crash which leads to Milan being hospitalised and in urgent need of blood. The doctor reveals that Milan has a rare blood group Bombay O+ and only two people has the same group. With the first person dead, the only person remaining with the same blood group is a bar dancer named Rosy.

Sathya travels to K.G.F and brings Rosy, a bar dancer, by paying a debt she owed which forced her to work in a dance bar. David tries to stop Rosy from getting to Milan and sends some goons but Sathya overpowers them. Sathya along with Rosy on the road once again faces David and a car chase ensues but Sathya confuses and tricks David into chasing a police car which has another Rosy from the same bar.

Milan is rescued and asks Sathya about the reason of helping her. Sathya tells that he wanted a bank loan through her help so that he can open a club. Few months later, Sathya finally opens a club with Milan and Rosy's help.

== Cast ==
- Jayaram as Sathya
- Roma Asrani as Rosy
- Parvathy Nambiar as Milan
- Deepak Jethi as Don David
- Rohini as Doctor
- Raj Kapoor as A Politician in Karnataka
- Aju Varghese as Boban
- Sudheer Karamana
- Ranjith Sankar
- Vinod Kumar Alva
- Kottayam Nazeer
- Vijayaraghavan
- Nandu
- Balachandran Chullikkadu
- Shobha Mohan
- Sohan Seenulal
- Saju Navodaya
- M. A. Nishad
- Manu
- Manka Mahesh

== Production ==
The filming began in late March 2016 in Kochi, Kerala. The shoot took place at Pondicherry. Jayaram who plays a Tamil Brahmin lost 10 kilos of his weight for his character in the film. Kannada actress Nikita Thukral and Malayalam actress Parvathy Thiruvothu were signed to play the female lead roles opposite Jayaram but were replaced by Roma and Parvathy Nambiar. The film marks Roma's come back after a sabbatical. Initially, Raai Laxmi was signed to play an undisclosed role. Bollywood actor Rahul Dev and Kannada actor Vinod Kumar Alva were also part of the cast.

== Music ==
The film's songs and background score were composed by Gopi Sundar. The music album was released by the label Millennium Audios.
