= Press Club, Thiruvananthapuram =

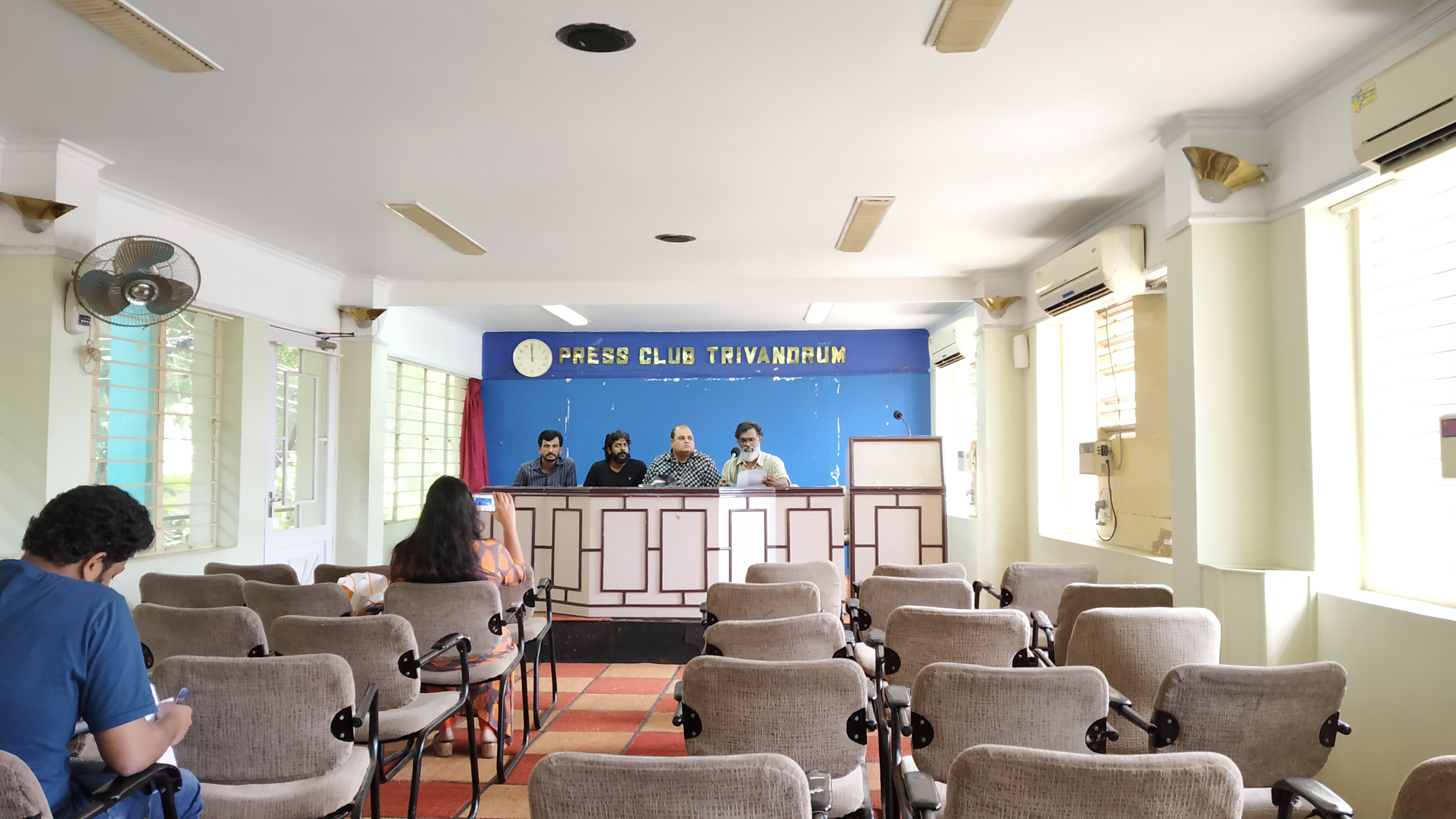
Press club, Thiruvananthapuram

The Press Club, Thiruvananthapuram is the hub of media activities in Thiruvananthapuram, capital of Kerala. Established in 1965 with 20 members, which has now swelled into 350. Governor Sahay addressed the first ‘Meet-the-Press’ program on 8 February 1967.

== History ==
E. M. S. Namboodiripad, the Chief Minister of Kerala, laid the foundation stone of the Press Club Building on 17 April 1968, and Prime Minister Indira Gandhi inaugurated the three storied building presently hosting the Press Club Thiruvananthapuram on 19 May 1969.

== Institute of Journalism ==
The Institute of Journalism, Thiruvananthapuram the first journalism institute in India to be run by professional journalists, started functioning in 1968. The founder-director of the Institute was M Sivaram, who had worked with the Reuters.

The Institute offers a one-year Post-Graduate Diploma in journalism (PGDJ) and a Certificate Courses in Electronic Journalism, Radio and TV jockeying, news photography and Citizen journalism.

== Facilities ==
A new bloc, with a cellar for recreational activities (Sanketam), was declared open by Union Minister of State for Information and Broadcasting Ajit Kumar Panja on 9 January 1989, in the presence of Kerala Revenue Minister PS Sreenivasan and Leader of the Opposition K. Karunakaran. The air-conditioned conference hall of the building, with the capacity to seat 100 persons, is claimed to be largest of its kind in Press Clubs anywhere in the country.

The foundation stone for the third building, replacing the original home of the club, was laid by President Dr Shankar Dayal Sharma on 13 February 1996.

A second centrally-air-conditioned conference hall with the latest acoustic facilities was inaugurated by Chief Minister E. K. Nayanar on 27 August 2000 on the third floor of the first building. A new building, which mainly houses the Institute of Journalism, was inaugurated by Chief Minister A. K. Antony in 2003.

In 2005, Chief Minister Oommen Chandy inaugurated the gymnasium in its cellar. A year later, the Chief Minister inaugurated the information centre and library on the ground floor of the new building.

The Club has instituted nine annual awards: the M Sivaraman Award for News Stories and Features, the KC Sebastian Award for Political Reporting, the Swadeshabhimani Award for Layout and Design, the News Photography Award, the Cartoon Award, the National Award for the Best Features in English and the V Krishnamoorthy Award for the Best News Story in English.

== Activities ==
The activities of the Press Club include exchange programmes with fraternal clubs, provision of media-related consultancy services to the government, conducting seminars, Meet-the-Press programmes and workshops on development and mass media-related issues, creation of new recreational avenues for members and their families and skill-upgradation programmes. It also provides insurance cover for all its members and their families.
