= Lucian Jayasuriya =

Sri Lankan civil servant and medical manager

- Born: Sri Lanka
- Education: University of Colombo
- Occupations: Medical Manager, Civil Servant,
- Employer(s): Ministry of Health Sri Lanka Ministry of Teaching Hospitals, Post Graduate Institute of Medicine, Glaxo Smith Kline
- Known for: Health care reform
- Title: Dr

Dr. Lucian Jayasuriya is a Sri Lankan civil servant and medical manager.

== Ministry of Health ==
Jayasurya has held many positions of responsibility in the Sri Lankan healthcare system.

Jayasuriya trained at Ceylon Medical College (later Faculty of Medicine, University of Colombo) and joined the Health Ministry as an Intern Medical officer in 1962. His first posting after the internship was as District Medical Officer (DMO), Ittapana from April 1963 to April 1965. Jayasuriya held the posts of Director General Hospital Colombo (later renamed the National Hospital of Sri Lanka) 1982–1984, Director General Ministry of Teaching Hospitals 1984–1989 and Additional Secretary Ministry of Health 1995–1997.

== Pharmaceutical industry ==
He was Medical Advisor and later medical director of GlaxoSmithKline Sri Lanka from 1997 to 2013. He is part-time consultant to GlaxoSmithKline from 2014 to 2019

== Professional organisations ==
Jayasuriya has provided leadership to several medical organisations..

He served as Founder and President of the Sri Lanka College of Venereologists from 1996 to 1997, President of the College of Medical Administrators in 1997 and as President of the Sri Lanka Medical Association (SLMA) in 1995. He is credited with initiating career guidance seminars for doctors in Sri Lanka and initiating the health management committee of the SLMA. He also served on the Drugs Committee and Communicable Diseases Committee of the SLMA in addition to editing the SLMA Guidelines on Vaccines 2001, 2004, 2008, 2011.

Jayasuriya served as chairman of the Board of Management Postgraduate Institute of Medicine from 2001 to 2004 and again from 2011 to 2012, as a council member of the Sri Lanka Medical Council, the National Stroke Association and The safe bottle Lamp Foundation.

Jayasuriya has been a critic of both government ministries as well as the medical trade union Government Medical Officers Association (GMOA). He is referred to as "a prominent and powerful figure in medical circles" in an editorial in the Daily Mirror. He wrote the obituaries and appreciation of Surendra Ramachandran.

=== Awards and recognition ===
Jayasuriya has been honoured by many of the medical educational institutions teaching medical management and by professional associations. These include:

- Honorary Fellowship of the Postgraduate Institute of Medicine
- Honorary Fellowship of the College of General Practitioners of Sri Lanka
- Fellowship of the College of Medical Administrators
- Fellowship of the College of Venereologists

He delivered the EM Wijerama endowment lecture awarded by the Sri Lanka Medical Association in 2003. He delivered the MPM Cooray memorial oration "Reflections of a Catholic Doctor" on 5 November 2011.,
