= 10:30 am Local Call =

2013 Malayalam movie

- Directed by: Manu Sudhakaran
- Written by: Arunlal Ramachandran
- Produced by: Priya Pillay
- Starring: Nishan K. P. Nanaiah; Shritha Sivadas
- Cinematography: Krish Kymal
- Edited by: Don Max
- Music by: Gopi Sunder
- Production company: Priya Lakshmi Media
- Release date: 22 February 2013
- Country: India
- Language: Malayalam

10:30 am Local Call is a 2013 Indian Malayalam-language mystery film directed by Manu Sudhakaran. The film stars Nishan K. P. Nanaiah, Shritha Sivadas, Kailash, Lal, Mrudula Murali, and Jennifer Antony in prominent roles.

== Plot ==
Alby works in a Nissan showroom. His wife, Ann, works as a radio jockey. Alby's old sweetheart, Nimmy enters his life when her husband, Vishnu, leaves her over suspicion that she is having an affair. Alby is forced to take her to a homestay, where they share a room together. The story takes a sudden turn when Nimmy is found dead. Alby tries to move on with his life until he is disturbed by a call from a stranger at 10:30 am local time. He is extorted into obeying the commands of the caller, and finds himself disturbed doing those tasks. The story progresses with his journey to learn the truth behind all of his mishaps.

== Cast ==
- Nishan K. P. Nanaiah as Alby
- Shritha Sivadas as Nimmy
- Mrudula Murali as Ann
- Lal as Major Gouridasan, Nimmy's Father (caller)
- Kailash as Vishnu/ Captain Gautam
- Krishna as Roy Thomas
- Anoop Chandran as Jaishankar
- Manuraj as Vasu
- Jennifer Antony

== Soundtrack ==
The film's soundtrack contains 2 songs, bothcomposed by Gopi Sunder, with lyrics by Rafeeq Ahmed and Murukan Kattakada.

#	Title	Singer(s)
1	"Etho Sayahna"	Sachin Warrier
2	"Panchavarna"	Suchith Suresan, Gopi Sunder

== Reception ==
Sify wrote "For all those who are used to watching taut thrillers that leave you spellbound, 10.30 am Local Call could end up as a joke, at best. It is amateurish to the core, predictable and its making lacks any kind of imagination".

Indiaglitz wrote "10 30 am Local call has a decent and absorbing narrative and some good performances coupled with a fine technical side, soulful BG and music as its aces".

Veeyen from Nowrunning gave 2 stars and wrote "10.30 am Local Call lacks the very vital element of a thriller - that of a persuasive ground that would put in the final piece and complete the puzzle".
