= Hero (2012 film) =

2012 Indian Malayalam-language action film

- Theatrical release poster
- Directed by: Diphan
- Written by: Vinod Guruvayur
- Produced by: G.P. Vijayakumar
- Starring: Prithviraj Sukumaran; Srikanth; Anoop Menon; Yami Gautam
- Narrated by: Anoop Menon
- Cinematography: Bharani K. Dharan
- Edited by: Samjith Mohammed
- Music by: Gopi Sundar
- Production company: Seven Arts International
- Distributed by: Seven Arts International Release
- Release date: 25 May 2012 (India)
- Running time: 163 minutes
- Country: India
- Language: Malayalam

Hero is a 2012 Indian Malayalam-language action film directed by Diphan, written by Vinod Guruvayur, and produced by Seven Arts International. It stars Prithviraj Sukumaran, Srikanth, Anoop Menon, Yami Gautam (in her only Malayalam debut), Bala, Thalaivasal Vijay, Kottayam Nazeer, Nandu, Anil Murali and Tini Tom. The music was composed by Gopi Sundar, while the cinematography and editing were handled by Bharani K. Dharan and Samjith Mohammed. In their previous collaborations in Kana Kandaen (2005) and Police Police (2010), Srikanth played the protagonist, while Prithviraj Sukumaran played the antagonist. In this film it is currently the opposite, Prithviraj plays the protagonist and Srikanth plays the antagonist.

The film was released on 25 May 2012. Upon release, the film mainly received negative reviews from critics, with criticism towards its illogical script and dialogues. Hence, the film was a box-office bomb.

== Plot ==
Dharmarajan, is an action choreographer running a combat academy who, in need of money for his daughter's marriage, visits one of his old students Aadhityan, one of the top directors in Malayalam cinema. Aadhityan gives a chance to Dharmarajan, who seeks help from his several students to assist him with the job, but no one helps him. Dharmarajan visits his favourite student Tarzan Antony, who left him due to some personal issues.

Antony agrees and joins the film set, where he meets Superstar Premanand and lady superstar Gowri Menon, who are one of the top actors in the film industry. Premanand, who is also the son of Home Minister, is depressed about his earlier flop films and needs his upcoming film to be a box office hit, where he collaborates with his friend Aadhityan for the film. Premanand likes Gowri and tries to impress her in several ways, but she feigns ignorance due to Premanand's self-praising attitude and arrogance.

Antony's dedication to his work impresses Gowri. The film is released and becomes a hit. The audience (who do not know the actual hero behind the screen) appreciates Premanand for the action sequences while Gowri, Aadhityan and the whole crew appreciates Antony for his work. Gowri and Antony fall in love with each other. Premanand decides to destroy Antony, who is a hindrance between him and Gowri. At that time, Aadhityan announces his next project with the same cast and crew.

Premanand wants to remove Antony from the project, but Aadhityan removes Premanand from the film and appoints Antony for the lead role. An enraged Premanand plots to kill Antony, but ends up killing Antony's father Thankachan. Aadhityan tells Antony to leave the matters for a while. Once the filming gets over and is released, Antony arrives at Premanand's hideout and defeats Premanand, Goutham Menon and Premanand's secretary Eldho. Later, Antony is accepted as the new Hero in the film industry and the film is declared as a blockbuster. Antony and Gowri are more than happy to openly accept their proposal.

== Cast ==
- Prithviraj Sukumaran as "Tarzan" Antony
- Srikanth as Superstar Premanand (voiceover by Mithun Ramesh)
- Anoop Menon as Adithyan, film director
- Yami Gautam as Gowri Menon, Antony's lover (voiceover by Vimmi Mariyam George)
- Thalaivasal Vijay as Dharmarajan Master, The fight master and Antony's master (voiceover by Shobi Thilakan)
- Nedumudi Venu as Thankachan, Antony's father
- Bala as Udayan
- Tini Tom as Suni, Antony's friend
- Anil Murali as Hakkim Bhai, Antony's friend
- Kottayam Nazeer as Bashaa, Dharmarajan's associate and Antony's friend
- Chali Pala as ACP Thomas Alex IPS
- Nandu as Sathyan, Adithyan's associated director
- Sudheer Karamana as Muthu, Antony's friend and Udayan's associate
- Dinesh Panicker as Home Minister Bhaskaran, Premanand's father
- Sadiq as CI Honeydas
- Jaffar Idukki as Murugan Desentmukku, Gowri Menon's Makeupman
- Arun Cherukavil as Goutham Menon, Premanand's friend and henchmen
- Indrans as Pallan
- Shoba Mohan as Sarojini, Dharmarajan Master's wife
- K. P. A. C. Lalitha as Mary Thankachan, Antony's mother
- Malavika Menon as Annie Thankachan, Antony's sister
- Rosin Jolly
- Sarayu Mohan as Dharmarajan Master's daughter
- Kiran Raj as Eldho, Premanand's henchmen
- Alwyn Fernandus

== Music ==
Hero

Soundtrack album by Gopi Sunder
- Released: 13 May 2012
- Recorded: 2012
- Genre: Feature film soundtrack
- Length: 18:04
- Language: Malayalam
- Label: Satyam Audios
- Producer: Vijayakumar

Gopi Sunder chronology
Masters (2012)	Hero (2012)	Ustad Hotel (2012)

The soundtrack of the film was composed by Gopi Sunder. The soundtrack album was launched on 13 May 2012 at People's Plaza in Cochin.

Track list
No.	Title	Lyrics	Singer(s)	Length
1.	"Nero Nero"	Shibu Chakravarthi	Gopi Sunder	4:38
2.	"Mayathe Ormayil"	Shibu Chakravarthi	Haricharan, Chinmayi	4:52
3.	"Onnu Paranjaal"	Anil Panachooran	Prithviraj, Gopi Sunder	4:25
4.	"Kaar Kaar"	Shibu Chakravarthi	Gopi Sunder	4:14
Total length:				18:04

== Release ==
Hero was released on 25 May 2012 worldwide.

== Reception ==
=== Critical response ===
Hero mainly received negative reviews from critics. Paresh C Palicha of Rediff wrote "Hero does try to be different in telling the story of a stuntman, but ends up as the usual action film in the 'cinema within cinema' format." Smitha Nambiar of Filmibeat wrote "Hero is an average film and can be enjoyed mainly if you are a fan of Prithviraj." News18 wrote "Hero is heavily loaded for Prithvi's fans and for the rest, a film on 'filmmaking', that too about stuntmen have got something to cherish."

== In Popular Culture ==
The film's dialogues, including the phrase "Ayyappa" by fight master and the line "Charge aayi" spoken by Adithyan (Anoop Menon), initially became viral internet memes and troll topics before being paid tribute to in the 2026 Malayalam romantic comedy film Bethlehem Kudumba Unit.
