= Ganesh Sundaram =

Indian playback singer

- Born: 30 May 1969 (age 57); Ernakulam, Kerala, India
- Occupation: Singer
- Years active: 1999–present
- Spouse: Smitha
- Children: Sankar; Sreedhar

Ganesh Sundaram (born 30 May 1969) is an Indian playback singer active mainly in Malayalam films.

== About ==
Ganesh Sundaram was born to Mr N. Sundaram Chettiyar and Mrs Meenakshi in 1969 at Changanacherry in Kottayam district. Later he was taken to Tripunithura, the cultural capital of Ernakulam district and had his primary schooling there at the Thekkumbhagam govt upper primary school. He then moved to Tripunithura govt boys high school and Chottanikkara Govt higher secondary school. During these school years Ganesh earned enough and more affection from teachers and students as a singer and admirer of arts and Men.

== Early life ==
He started taking lessons in carnatic music at an age of ten. Mrs Lailu was his first guru in carnatic music and later musicians like S.K.Subrahmaniam, Kanjangad Sreenivasan, Kaavalam Sreekumar, Mrs Indira and Tomy Thomas gave him with music lessons. His competence in vocal recital searched higher realms as he progressed from schooling to university education. Prizes and praises that went his way were proofs of his in-born capacity as a musician. As a result, 1988, when he was just 19, he became one of the beloved stars of the professional ganamela stages. In 1989, he was selected to be a Bgrade artist in All India Radio. Just two years later he was elevated to B-high grade artist.

== Discography ==
The work that marked his presence in the devotional sector was the album "Guruthipooja", a devotional offering to the Chottanikkara Devi, in the year 1999-2000, featuring 2 songs "Amme Narayana Devi Narayana" and "Chottanikkara Amme Jagadambike", with music composed by M. G. Anil. It was really a big hit that it later had almost 20 imitations, even was dubbed in Tamil and Telugu languages shortly with the voices of Unni Menon and Mano respectively. "Guruthipooja" was preceded by equally great works like "Padmahara priya", "AAlilakkanna", "Sivaranjini", "Sivapooja", "Kaayamboo varnan", "Sree Theertha pradayini", "Devyai Nama", "Amme Nama" etc.

== Playback episode ==
A number of prominent film directors and composers have made of his vocals in their works. This list includes Lal Jose, Siby Malayil, Jayaraj, Kamal Jibu Jacob, Ranjith Sankar, Rafeeq Ahammed, Kaithapram Damodaran Namboothiri, Kaithapram Viswanathan, Vayalar Sarathchandran, Gireesh Puthencheri, Anil panachooran, Santhosh varma, Biji Bal, Afsal Yusuf and S.Balakrishnan. Songs like "Himakanamaniyumee", "Kaayal karayilake pon naaru", "Thaara jaalam", "Changazhi muthumai", "Orukodi tharangale", "Venalozhiyunnu", and "Punchirikkannulla" remain popular. Ganesh has sung for more than 20 Movies in Malayalam like Veneesile Vyapari, Violin, Kudumbasree Travels, Loud Speaker, Minnaminnikoottam, Kayamkulam Kanaran, Sree Rama Rajyam, Mayakkazhcha Parankimala, Daivathinte Swantham Cletus, Vikramadithyan, and Vellimoonga, one multilingual movie (Swamy) and one Tamil movie (Chempattai).
