= List of Malayalam films of 2013 =

The tables list the Malayalam films released in theaters in the year 2013. Premiere shows and film festival screenings are not considered as releases for this list.

== Malayalam films ==
| Opening | | Title | Director | Cast | Genre | Ref |
|---|---|---|---|---|---|---|
| J A N U A R Y | 4 | Annayum Rasoolum | Rajeev Ravi | Fahadh Faasil, Andrea Jeremiah | Romance | |
| J A N U A R Y | 4 | Nee Ko Njaa Cha | Gireesh | Sunny Wayne, Parvathy Nair | Comedy | |
| J A N U A R Y | 4 | Ente | Rajesh Touchriver | Siddique, Anjali Patil, Lakshmi Menon | Drama | |
| J A N U A R Y | 4 | Entry | Rajesh Amanakara | Baburaj, Ranjini Haridas, Bhagath Manuel, Sija Rose | Action, Drama | |
| J A N U A R Y | 4 | Lisammayude Veedu | Babu Janardhanan | Meera Jasmine, Rahul Madhav, Salim Kumar | Drama | |
| J A N U A R Y | 4 | My Fan Ramu | Nikhil K. Menon | Saiju Kurup, Rajeev Pillai | Comedy | |
| J A N U A R Y | 11 | Isaac Newton S/O Philipose | V Bosse | Lal, Nedumudi Venu, Abhinaya, Tini Tom | Comedy | |
| J A N U A R Y | 11 | Maad Dad | Revathy S Varma | Lal, Nazriya Nazim, Meghana Raj | Drama | |
| J A N U A R Y | 11 | Yathrakkoduvil | Basil Zak | Sreejith Vijay, Vidya, Thilakan | Drama | |
| J A N U A R Y | 17 | Romans | Boban Samuel | Kunchacko Boban, Biju Menon, Niveda Thomas, Aparna Nair | Comedy, Thriller | |
| J A N U A R Y | 18 | Annum Innum Ennum | Rajesh Nair | Jishnu Raghavan, Nishan, Thilakan | Drama, Romance | |
| J A N U A R Y | 18 | Nakhangal | Suresh Krishnan | Rakendu, Madan Mohan, Megha, Sumesh | Family, Thriller | |
| J A N U A R Y | 18 | Oru Yathrayil | Priyanandanan, Major Ravi, Rajesh Amanakara, Mathews | Vineeth Kumar, Remya Nambeesan, Lakshmi Gopalaswami | Anthology, Drama | |
| J A N U A R Y | 25 | Proprietors: Kammath & Kammath | Thomson K. Thomas | Mammootty, Dileep, Rima Kallingal, Karthika Nair | Comedy, Action | |
| J A N U A R Y | 25 | Players | Vasudev Sanal | Jayasurya, Kavya Madhavan, Jishnu, Nishanth Sagar | Romance, Drama | |
| J A N U A R Y | 31 | Lokpal | Joshiy | Mohanlal, Kavya Madhavan | Drama | |
| F E B R U A R Y | 8 | Dracula 2012 3D | Vinayan | Sudheer Sukumaran, Prabhu, Shraddha Das, Monal Gajjar, Thilakan | Horror | |
| F E B R U A R Y | 8 | Natholi Oru Cheriya Meenalla | V. K. Prakash | Fahadh Faasil, Kamalinee Mukherjee, Rima Kallingal, Aishwarya | Romance, Comedy | |
| F E B R U A R Y | 8 | Oru Nerinte Nombaram | P. Sivaram | Anoop David, Vaigha, Ashamol, Baby Hridya | Drama | |
| F E B R U A R Y | 15 | Celluloid | Kamal | Prithviraj, Mamta Mohandas, Chandni | Biopic | |
| F E B R U A R Y | 15 | Cowboy | P. Balachandrakumar | Asif Ali, Mythili, Bala, Ambika Mohan | Action, Thriller | |
| F E B R U A R Y | 15 | Breaking News Live | Sudhir Ambalapadu | Kavya Madhavan, Mythili, Vineeth | Drama | |
| F E B R U A R Y | 15 | Black Butterfly | Rajaputra Ranjith | Mithun Murali, Malavika | Romance | |
| F E B R U A R Y | 15 | Housefull | Linson Antony | Tini Tom, Jyothirmayi | Comedy | |
| F E B R U A R Y | 22 | 10:30 am Local Call | Manu Sudhakaran | Nishan, Shritha Sivadas, Mrudula Murali, Lal, Kailash | Thriller | |
| F E B R U A R Y | 22 | David & Goliath | Rajeev Nath | Jayasurya, Anoop Menon, Soumya, Anumol | Thriller | |
| F E B R U A R Y | 22 | Shutter | Joy Mathew | Lal, Sreenivasan, Sajitha Madathil | Thriller | |
| M A R C H | 1 | Kili Poyi | Vinay Govind | Asif Ali, Aju Varghese | Stoner film | |
| M A R C H | 1 | Omega.exe | Binoy George | Harish Raj, Vineeth, Sanchu, Iniya | Drama | |
| M A R C H | 1 | Rose Guitarinaal | Ranjan Pramod | Richard Joy Thomas, Athmiya Rajan, Rejith Menon | Romance, Music | |
| M A R C H | 1 | Mahatma Ayyankali | Sooriya Deva | Aju Karthikeyan, Sweta Nakhatra, Madhu, Jagannatha Varma, Manu Varma | Biopic | |
| M A R C H | 3 | 120 Minutes | Ganesan Kamaraj | Nishan, Achyuth Kumar, Kalabhavan Mani | Thriller | |
| M A R C H | 7 | Rebecca Uthup Kizhakkemala | Sunder Das | Ann Augustine, Jishnu Raghavan, Sidharth Bharathan, Sai Kumar, Shari, Sukumari, Ambika Mohan | Sports film, Romance, Drama | |
| M A R C H | 8 | Lucky Star | Deepu Anthikad | Jayaram, Rachana Narayanankutty, Mukesh | Comedy, Drama | |
| M A R C H | 8 | Pakaram | Sreevallabhan | Om Prakash, Radhika, Siddique | Thriller, Revenge | |
| M A R C H | 8 | Radio | Umer Mohammed | Iniya, Sarayu, Nishan, Sreejith Vijay | Drama | |
| M A R C H | 8 | Poombattakalude Taazhvaaram | V. M. Akhilesh | Nima, Rajesh Mohan, Prethiknjan, Dhirar, Sandhra | Drama | |
| M A R C H | 15 | Dolls | Shalil Kallur | John, Sruthi Nair, Parvathy Nair | Romance, Drama | |
| M A R C H | 15 | Papilio Buddha | Jayan K. Cherian | Kallen Pokkudan, David Briggs, Padmapriya, Sreekumar, Saritha Sunil, Prakash Bare, Thampi Antony | Drama, Environmental film, Human rights | |
| M A R C H | 15 | Ithu Manthramo Thanthramo Kuthanthramo | Sainu Pallithazhathu | Murali Krishna, Mukesh, Baburaj, Suraj Venjaramoodu | Comedy | |
| M A R C H | 15 | Kanaa Paadam | Ameen Jawher | Bhasi, Aarya Gaythri | Drama | |
| M A R C H | 15 | Ithu Pathiramanal | M. Padmakumar | Unni Mukundan, Jayasurya, Remya Nambeesan | Action | |
| M A R C H | 15 | Good Idea | P. K. Sakir | Sreejith Vijay, Hanna Bella, Unni Sivapal, Ambika Mohan | Romance | |
| M A R C H | 21 | Red Wine | Salam Bappu | Mohanlal, Fahad Fazil, Asif Ali, Meghana Raj, Meera Nandan, Miya, Saiju Kurup, Suraj Venjaramoodu, Kailash | Investigative | |
| M A R C H | 22 | Amen | Lijo Jose Pellissery | Indrajith, Fahadh Faasil, Swati Reddy, Rachana | Musical | |
| M A R C H | 22 | 3 Dots | Sugeeth | Kunchacko Boban, Biju Menon, Prathap Pothan, Janani Iyer | Romance, Comedy, Thriller | |
| M A R C H | 22 | Yathra Thudarunnu | Jayan Sivapuram | Lakshmi Gopalaswami, Irshad, Nedumudi Venu | Drama | |
| M A R C H | 30 | Kutteem Kolum | Guinness Pakru | Guinness Pakru, Aditya, Sanusha, Leya | Drama, Action | |
| A P R I L | 5 | Immanuel | Lal Jose | Mammootty, Fahadh Faasil, Reenu Mathews | Drama | |
| A P R I L | 5 | Sound Thoma | Vyshakh | Dileep, Namitha Pramod, Mukesh, Suraj Venjaramoodu, Nedumudi Venu, Sai Kumar, Subbaraju | Masala | |
| A P R I L | 12 | Ladies & Gentleman | Siddique | Mohanlal, Meera Jasmine, Mamta Mohandas, Padmapriya, Mithra Kurian | Comedy | |
| A P R I L | 19 | Climax | Anil | Sana Khan, Nishan | Biopic | |
| A P R I L | 19 | SIM | Diphan | Deepak Parambol, Ann Augustine | Comedy, Drama | |
| A P R I L | 26 | Akam | Shalini Usha Nair | Fahad Fazil, Anumol | Psychological thriller | |
| A P R I L | 26 | 72 Model | Rajasenan | Govind Padmasurya, Sreejith Vijay, Soniya Das | Drama, Comedy | |
| A P R I L | 26 | August Club | K. B. Venu | Rima Kallingal, Murali Gopy, Thilakan | Romance, Drama | |
| A P R I L | 26 | Progress Report | Saajan | Siddique, Geetha | Drama | |
| A P R I L | 26 | Ente Puthiya Number | A. G. Sukumaran | Jaydev, Mehroof, Keerthana, Minnu | Drama | |
| A P R I L | 26 | Swaasam | Harilal Gandhi | Jinu Azeez, Jyothi Pillai, Ambika Mohan | Drama | |
| M A Y | 3 | Bharya Athra Pora | Akku Akbar | Jayaram, Gopika | Family | |
| M A Y | 3 | Hotel California | Aji John | Jayasurya, Anoop Menon, Honey Rose, Maria Roy | Comedy, Action | |
| M A Y | 3 | Mumbai Police | Rosshan Andrrews | Prithviraj, Jayasurya, Maria Roy, Rahman | Thriller | |
| M A Y | 10 | Neram | Alphonse Putharen | Nivin Pauly, Nazriya Nazim, Manoj K. Jayan | Romance, Comedy, Thriller | |
| M A Y | 10 | Manikya Thamburattiyum Christmas Carolum | Raffi T M, Prof. G Gopalakrishnan | Madhu, Devan, Sukanya, Sona Nair | Drama | |
| M A Y | 10 | Musafir | Pramod Pappan | Rahman, Mamta Mohandas, Bala, Divya Unni | Thriller, Drama | |
| M A Y | 17 | Aaru Sundarimaarude Katha | Rajesh K. Abraham | Lakshmi Rai, Shamna Kasim, Nadiya Moidu, Lena, Narain | Romance | |
| M A Y | 17 | Orissa | M. Padmakumar | Unni Mukundan, Sanika Nambiar, Kaniha | Drama | |
| M A Y | 17 | Vallatha Pahayan | Niyas Bakker, Razaq Muhammed | Manikandan Pattambi, Rachana, Vinod Kovoor, Niyas Bakker, | Drama | |
| M A Y | 24 | Aattakatha | Kannan Perunudiyoor | Vineeth, Meera Nandan, Malavika Wales | Musical, Romance | |
| M A Y | 24 | English: An Autumn in London | Shyamaprasad | Jayasurya, Nivin Pauly, Mukesh, Nadia Moidu, Remya Nambeesan | Drama, Black humour | |
| M A Y | 24 | Karuman Kasappan | Sajil Parli | Shaji, Krisha Kurup, Vinod | Drama | |
| M A Y | 24 | Once Upon a Time | Binu Sasidharan | Salim Kumar, Mala Aravindan | Animation | |
| M A Y | 24 | Up & Down: Mukalil Oralundu | T. K. Rajeev Kumar | Indrajith, Prathap Pothen, Meghana Raj, Remya Nambeesan, Shruthy Menon | Psychological thriller | |
| M A Y | 31 | Abhiyum Njanum | S. P. Mahesh | Rohith, Archana Kavi, Lal, Menaka, Rejith Menon | Romance | |
| J U N E | 7 | Honey Bee | Jean Paul Lal | Asif Ali, Bhavana, Sreenath Bhasi, Lal, Archana Kavi | Comedy | |
| J U N E | 7 | Pigman | Avira Rebecca | Jayasurya, Remya Nambeesan | Drama | |
| J U N E | 7 | Teens | Jahangir Shamz | Sajith Raj, Divyadarshan | Romance, Drama | |
| J U N E | 14 | ABCD: American-Born Confused Desi | Martin Prakkat | Dulquer Salmaan, Jacob Gregory, Aparna Gopinath | Comedy | |
| J U N E | 14 | Left Right Left | Arun Kumar Aravind | Indrajith, Murali Gopy, Saiju Kurup, Remya Nambeesan, Lena | Political | |
| J U N E | 14 | Thank You | V. K. Prakash | Jayasurya, Honey Rose, Saiju Kurup | Thriller, Drama | |
| J U N E | 21 | Money Back Policy | Jayaraj Vijay | Sreenivasan, Sreejith Vijay, Sarayu | Comedy | |
| J U N E | 21 | Mr. Bean | Reji Paul | Divya Darshan, Avanthika Mohan, Pritam Kagne, Deepa Jayan | Comedy | |
| J U N E | 22 | 5 Sundarikal | Amal Neerad, Sameer Thahir, Aashiq Abu, Anwar Rasheed, Shyju Khalid | Dulquer Salman, Nivin Pauly, Fahadh Faasil, Kavya Madhavan, Honey Rose, Isha Sharvani | Anthology, Romance | |
| J U N E | 28 | Ayaal | Suresh Unnithan | Lal, Iniya, Lena, Lakshmi Sharma | Period, Drama | |
| J U N E | 28 | God for Sale | Babu Janardhanan | Kunchacko Boban, Anumol, Jyothi Krishna, Suraj Venjaramoodu | Satire, Drama | |
| J U N E | 28 | Paisa Paisa | Prasanth Murali | Indrajith, Mamta Mohandas, Sandhya, Apoorva Bose | Thriller | |
| J U L Y | 5 | Buddy | Raaj Prabavathy Menon | Anoop Menon, Srikanth, Bhumika Chawla, Balachandra Menon, Asha Sarath | Comedy, Drama | |
| J U L Y | 5 | Mizhi | Tejas Perumanna | Sudheesh, Pooja Vijayan, Sona, Ashokan, Riza Bava | Drama | |
| J U L Y | 5 | Tourist Home | Shebi | Sreejith Vijay, Meera Nandan, Hemanth Menon, Saiju Kurup, Kalabhavan Mani, Sarayu | Drama | |
| J U L Y | 12 | Kallante Makan | Sudev | Anoop Chandran, Lakshmipriya, Master Yadukrishnan | Comedy | |
| J U L Y | 12 | Police Maaman | B. R. Jacob | Baburaj, Radha Varma | Comedy | |
| J U L Y | 19 | Crocodile Love Story | Anoop Ramesh | Praveen Prem, Avanthika Mohan, Manikuttan, Kalabhavan Mani | Comedy, Romance | |
| J U L Y | 19 | Kunthapura | Joe Eshwar | Biyon, Priya Lal, Anu Hassan | Drama, Period | |
| J U L Y | 19 | Vazhiyariyathe | V. M. Karayad | Sai Balan, Dimple Rose | Romance | |
| J U L Y | 26 | One | Parthan Mohan | Soumya Sadanandan, Rosmin Jolly, Jagadeesh | Horror | |
| J U L Y | 26 | 101 Chodyangal | Sidhartha Shiva | Indrajith, Lena, Nishant Sagar, Kalabhavan Niyas | Drama | |
| J U L Y | 26 | Black Ticket | Udayachandran | Sai Kumar, Prem Kumar, Anil Murali, Majeed, Ambika Mohan | Drama | |
| A U G U S T | 2 | Penangunni | Manoj Chandrasekharan | Abhijit Sanal, Vaishnavi | Children's film | |
| A U G U S T | 8 | Kadal Kadannu Oru Maathukutty | Ranjith | Mammootty, Alisha Mohammed, Nedumudi Venu, Meera Nandan | Drama | |
| A U G U S T | 9 | Memories | Jeethu Joseph | Prithviraj, Meghana Raj, Rahul Madhav, Miya | Psychological thriller film | |
| A U G U S T | 9 | Neelakasham Pachakadal Chuvanna Bhoomi | Sameer Thahir | Dulquer Salmaan, Sunny Wayne | Road Movie | |
| A U G U S T | 9 | Pullipulikalum Aattinkuttiyum | Lal Jose | Kunchako Boban, Namitha Pramod, Shammi Thilakan, Suraj Venjaramoodu, Joju George, Harisree Ashokan | Comedy action | |
| A U G U S T | 22 | Kalimannu | Blessy | Shweta Menon, Biju Menon, Suhasini | Drama | |
| A U G U S T | 23 | Olipporu | A. V. Sasidharan | Fahadh Faasil, Subiksha, Kalabhavan Mani, Thalaivasal Vijay, Sidharth Bharathan | Drama | |
| A U G U S T | 30 | Arikil Oraal | Sunil Ibrahim | Indrajith, Nivin Pauly, Remya Nambeeshan, Lena | Mystery, Thriller | |
| A U G U S T | 30 | Artist | Shyamaprasad | Fahadh Faasil, Ann Augustine, Sreeram Ramachandran | Drama | |
| A U G U S T | 30 | Kunjananthante Kada | Salim Ahamed | Mammootty, Nyla Usha, Salim Kumar, Balachandra Menon | Drama | |
| S E P T E M B E R | 6 | BlackBerry | K. B. Madhu | Baburaj, Sunny Wayne, Mythili | Comedy | |
| S E P T E M B E R | 6 | Raavu | Ajith Ravi Pegasus | Sanam Prasad, Nancy Gupta, Manasi Thomas, Vinu Abraham | Drama | |
| S E P T E M B E R | 12 | Daivathinte Swantham Cleetus | Marthandan | Mammootty, Honey Rose, Siddique, Suraj Venjaramoodu, Aju Varghese | Comedy, Drama | |
| S E P T E M B E R | 13 | D Company | M. Padmakumar, Dipan, Vinod Vijayan | Jayasurya, Fahadh Faasil, Asif Ali, Anoop Menon, Unni Mukundan, Samuthirakani, Bhama, Ananya | Action | |
| S E P T E M B E R | 14 | Sringaravelan | Jose Thomas | Dileep, Vedhika,Lal, Joy Mathew, Baburaj, Shammi Thilakan, Nedumudi Venu, Kalabhavan Shajon | action comedy | |
| S E P T E M B E R | 15 | Ezhamathe Varavu | Hariharan | Vineeth, Indrajith, Bhavana, Kavitha | Thriller | |
| S E P T E M B E R | 15 | North 24 Kaatham | Anil Radhakrishnan Menon | Fahadh Faasil, Nedumudi Venu, Swati Reddy | Thriller | |
| S E P T E M B E R | 20 | Radio Jockey | Rajasenan | Arjun Nandakumar, Nimisha Suresh, Ria Saira, Rajasenan | Drama | |
| S E P T E M B E R | 27 | Careebeyans | Nandukumar | Kalabhavan Mani, Swetha Menon, Siddigue, Ambika Mohan | Action | |
| S E P T E M B E R | 27 | KQ | Baiju Johnson | Baiju Johnson, Anson Paul, Parvathy Omanakuttan, I. M. Vijayan, Shakeela | Action | |
| S E P T E M B E R | 27 | Zachariayude Garbhinikal | Aneesh Anvar | Lal, Rima Kallingal, Sanusha | Comedy | |
| O C T O B E R | 4 | 3G : Third Generation | A. Jayaprakash | John Jacob, Arun Narayan, Mehul James, Vidya Unni | Romance | |
| O C T O B E R | 4 | Camel Safari | Jayaraj | Arun Shankar, Pankaja Menon, Sekhar Menon, Kamal Gaur | Romance | |
| O C T O B E R | 4 | Kaanchi | G. N. Krishnakumar | Indrajith, Murali Gopy, Maria John, Archana Gupta | Action | |
| O C T O B E R | 4 | Last Bus 8:35 pm | Sreejith Mahadevan | Devan, Sona, Joe, Kavya, Ponnu | Thriller | |
| O C T O B E R | 4 | Pattupusthakam | Prakash Kolleri | Vinod Isac, Asha Tomy | Drama, Environmental film | |
| O C T O B E R | 4 | Pithavum Kanyakayum | Rupesh Paul, Sajiv Menon | M. G. Sasi, Kripa, Sasi Kalinga | Drama | |
| O C T O B E R | 11 | Bunty Chor | Mathews Abraham | Nixon George, Sreejith Vijay, Praveen Prem, Kochupreman, Sasi Kalinga | Heist | |
| O C T O B E R | 11 | Idukki Gold | Aashiq Abu | Babu Antony, Maniyanpilla Raju, Sajitha Madathil | Drama | |
| O C T O B E R | 11 | Malayala Nadu | Sasi Vadakkedathu | Aniyappan, Arjun, Sruthibala | Romance | |
| O C T O B E R | 11 | Pattam Pole | Alagappan N. | Dulquer Salmaan, Malavika Mohanan, Archana Kavi, Anoop Menon | Romantic comedy | |
| O C T O B E R | 18 | Nadodimannan | Viji Thampi | Dileep, Ananya, Mythili, Archana Kavi, Sayaji Shinde | Political, action comedy | |
| O C T O B E R | 18 | Bangles | Dr. Suvid Wilson | Ajmal Ameer, Poonam Kaur, Archana Kavi | Thriller | |
| O C T O B E R | 25 | Cleopatra | Rajan Sankaradi | Manoj K. Jayan, Prerana | Drama | |
| O C T O B E R | 25 | Cold Storage | Vinod Vikraman, Shaiju Thamban | Basil, Jafeena, Muhamed Noufal | Thriller | |
| O C T O B E R | 25 | For Sale | Sathish Ananthapuri | Mukesh, Sandhya | Drama | |
| O C T O B E R | 25 | Pottas Bomb | Suresh Achoos | Indrans, Tini Tom, Priyanka, Anu SIthara, Chinju Mohan | Thriller | |
| N O V E M B E R | 7 | Philips and the Monkey Pen | Rojin Philip, Shanil Muhammed | Master Sanoop, Jayasurya, Remya Nambeesan | Children's film | |
| N O V E M B E R | 8 | Ginger | Shaji Kailas | Jayaram, Muktha | Drama | |
| N O V E M B E R | 8 | Kadhaveedu | Sohanlal | Kunchacko Boban, Bhama, Rituparna Sengupta | Anthology; Drama | |
| N O V E M B E R | 14 | Geethaanjali | Priyadarshan | Mohanlal, Nishan, Keerthi Suresh | Horror | |
| N O V E M B E R | 14 | Thira | Vineeth Sreenivasan | Shobhana, Dhyan Sreenivasan | Thriller | |
| N O V E M B E R | 15 | Oru Soppetty Katha | Hafiz Ismail | Shafeek Rahman, Hakkim Shajahan, Vanitha Manohar, Radhika Pillai | Comedy | |
| N O V E M B E R | 22 | Nadan | Kamal | Jayaram, Remya Nambeesan | Drama | |
| N O V E M B E R | 22 | Mukham Mootikal | P. K. Radhakrishnan | Guru Chemanchery Kunjiraman Nair, Irshad, Mohana | Drama | |
| N O V E M B E R | 22 | Vishudhan | Vysakh | Kunchacko Boban, Miya | Drama | |
| N O V E M B E R | 29 | Bicycle Thieves | Jis Joy | Asif Ali, Aparna Gopinath, Saiju Kurup, Aju Varghese | Drama | |
| N O V E M B E R | 29 | Escape from Uganda | Rajesh Nair | Rima Kallingal, Parthiban, Vijay Babu | Drama | |
| N O V E M B E R | 29 | Namboothiri Yuvavu @43 | Mahesh Sharma | Maniyanpilla Raju, Thanushree Reghuram | Drama | |
| N O V E M B E R | 29 | Punyalan Agarbathis | Ranjith Sankar | Jayasurya, Nyla Usha | Drama | |
| D E C E M B E R | 5 | Weeping Boy | Felix Joseph | Sreenivasan, Arjun Narayan, Shritha Sivadas, Praveena, Lena | Comedy | |
| D E C E M B E R | 6 | Chewing Gum | Praveen M. Sukumaran | Sunny Wayne, Thinkal Bhal | Drama | |
| D E C E M B E R | 6 | Ms Lekha Tharoor Kaanunnathu | Shajiyem | Meera Jasmine, Badri, Suraj venjaramoodu, sankar, nandu, rosinjolly, geetha vijayan | Psychological thriller, | |
| D E C E M B E R | 6 | The Power of Silence | V. K. Prakash | Mammootty, Pallavi Purohit, Anoop Menon | Thriller | |
| D E C E M B E R | 6 | Red Rain | Rahul Sadasivan | Narain, Leona Lishoy | Sci-Fi | |
| D E C E M B E R | 12 | Vedivazhipadu | Shambhu Purushothaman | Saiju Kurup, Indrajith, Anumol, Murali Gopy, Mythili, Anusree | Drama | |
| D E C E M B E R | 13 | Good Bad & Ugly | V. R. Rathish | Sreejith Vijay, Meghana Raj, Basil, Sanju | Drama | |
| D E C E M B E R | 13 | Lillies of March | Sathish Thariyan | Rahman, Abhimanyu, Abhinay, Sreejith Ravi | Drama | |
| D E C E M B E R | 13 | Njan Anaswaran | G. Krishnaswami | Ashokan, Vaiga | Drama | |
| D E C E M B E R | 19 | Drishyam | Jeethu Joseph | Mohanlal, Meena, Ansiba Hassan | Drama, Thriller | |
| D E C E M B E R | 20 | Oru Indian Pranayakadha | Sathyan Anthikkad | Fahadh Faasil, Amala Paul, Anu Sithara | | |
| D E C E M B E R | 20 | Ezhu Sundara Rathrikal | Lal Jose | Dileep, Rima Kallingal | | |
| D E C E M B E R | 20 | Goodbye December | Sajeed A. | Nandini Rai, Ushoshi Sengupta | | |

== Dubbed films ==
Movies dubbed into Malayalam
| Opening | Title | Director(s) | Original film | | Cast | Genre | Ref. |
| Opening | Title | Director(s) | Film | Language | Cast | Genre | Ref. |
|---|---|---|---|---|---|---|---|
| 4 January | Hai Ram Charan | Bhaskar | Orange | Telugu | Ram Charan Teja, Genelia D'Souza, Shazahn Padamsee, Sanchita Shetty | Action, Romance | [160] |
| 22 March | Pizza | Karthik Subbaraj | Pizza | Tamil | Vijay Sethupathi, Ramya Nambeesan | Thriller | |
| 28 March | Naayak | V.V. Vinayak | Naayak | Telugu | Ram Charan Teja, Kajal Aggarwal, Amala Paul | Action, Romance | |
| 29 March | Saint Dracula | Rupesh Paul | Saint Dracula 3D | English | Mitch Powell, Patricia Duarte, Daniel Shayler, Suzanne Roche | Horror | |
| 26 April | Action Khiladi | Krish | Krishnam Vande Jagadgurum | Telugu | Rana Daggubati, Nayantara | Action, Thriller | |
| 17 May | Choodan | Sreenu Vaitla | Dookudu | Telugu | Mahesh Babu, Samantha | Action, Thriller | |
| 24 May | Kuruthikkalam | Srinivasa Raj | Dandupalya | Kannada | Pooja Gandhi, Raghu Mukherjee, Priyanka Kothari | Action, Thriller | |
| 31 May | Romeo & Juliets | Puri Jagannadh | Iddarammayilatho | Telugu | Allu Arjun, Amala Paul, Catherine Tresa | Action, Romance | |
| 2 August | Kavacham | V.V. Vinayak | Adhurs | Telugu | Jr. NTR, Nayantara, Sheela | Action, Romance | |
| 6 September | Veerappan | A. M. R. Ramesh | Attahasa | Kannada | Arjun, Kishore, Lakshmi Rai | Action | |
| 18 October | Runner | Gunasekhar | Okkadu | Telugu | Mahesh Babu, Bhoomika Chawla, Prakash Raj | Action | |
| 13 December | Sarvakala Vallabhan | Veeru Potla | Doosukeltha | Telugu | Vishnu Manchu, Lavanya Tripathi, Saranya Nag | Action | |

== Notable deaths ==
Celebreties who died during the year
| Month | Date | Name | Age | Profession | Notable films |
| March | 5 | Rajasulochana | 78 | Actress | Manasakshi |
| March | 15 | Joseph Chacko | 89 | Actor | Snapaka Yohannan • 4 the People • By the People |
| March | 26 | Sukumari | 72 | Actress | Chettathi • Odaruthammava Aalariyam • Boeing Boeing • Vandanam • Mizhikal Sakshi • Gramam•Arappatta Kettiya Gramathil |
| April | 14 | P. B. Sreenivas | 82 | Singer | Harishchandra • Ninamaninja Kaalpaadukal • Thriveni |
| April | 18 | T. K. Ramamoorthy | 91 | Music Director | Lilly • Mariakutty |
| May | 11 | Kesava Panicker | 87 | Actor | Kanchana Sita |
| May | 25 | T. M. Soundararajan | 91 | Singer | Chayam |
| June | 15 | Manivannan | 59 | Actor | Phantom |
| June | 15 | S. Konnanatt | 88 | Director, Art director | Surumayitta Kannukal (director) • Bhargavi Nilayam • Chemmeen • Padayottam |
| June | 26 | K. Sukumaran (K. Suku) | 84 | Director, Producer | Ananthashayanam • Samudram • Kottaram Vilkkanundu • Snehikkan oru Pennu |
| July | 6 | Santo Krishnan (Krishnan Nair) | 92 | Actor, Stunt master | Minnunnathellam Ponnalla • Nithya Kanyaka • Madatharuvi • Meesa Madhavan • Aakasha Ganga |
| July | 12 | K. Velappan (Chamayam Velappan) | 83 | Makeup artist | Padayottam • Manjil Virinja Pookkal • My Dear Kuttichathan |
| July | 18 | Vaali | 82 | Lyricist | Manichithrathazhu |
| July | 23 | Manjula Vijayakumar | 59 | Actress | Inspector Balram • Abhimanyu • Jackpot |
| July | 25 | Ottapalam Pappan (N. P. Padmanabhan) | 68 | Actor | Valsalyam • Oru Maravathoor Kanavu • Pingami • Sallapam |
| August | 2 | V. Dakshinamoorthy | 94 | Music director | Nalla Thanka • Kavyamela • Vilakku Vangiya Veena • Mizhikal Sakshi |
| August | 7 | Sarathchandra Marathe | 84 | Music director | Avivahitharude Swargam • Mayoora Varnangal • Chanjattam • Uppu |
| September | 5 | Hakkim | 58 | Director, Actor | The Guard (Director); Mookilla Rajyathu • Thilakkam • Vettam • Kaazhcha • Rasikan • Naayika |
| October | 3 | Usha Ravi | 72 | Singer | Thambu • Ambalpoovu • Detective 909 Keralathil • Manju • Venal |
| October | 19 | K. Raghavan (Raghavan Master) | 99 | Music director | Neelakuyil • Nairu Pidicha Pulivalu • Kallichellamma • Poojakedutha Pookkal |
| October | 24 | Manna Dey (Prabodh Chandra Dey) | 94 | Playback singer | Chemmeen • Nellu |
| November | 14 | Augustine | 56 | Actor | Devasuram • Aaram Thamburan • Raavanaprabhu |
| November | 28 | Thiruthiyad Vilasini | 55 | Actress | Oru Pidi Ari • Indian Rupee • Celluloid |
| December | 14 | C. N. Karunakaran | 73 | Art director | Ore Thooval Pakshikal • Alicinte Anveshanam • Purushartham • Aswathamavu • Akkare |
