= Rathinirvedam (2011 film) =

- Directed by: T.K. Rajeev Kumar
- Written by: P. Padmarajan
- Based on: Rathinirvedam by Padmarajan
- Produced by: G. Suresh Kumar
- Starring: Shwetha Menon; Sreejith Vijay
- Cinematography: Manoj Pillai
- Edited by: B. Ajithkumar
- Music by: M. Jayachandran
- Production company: Revathy Kalamandhir
- Release dates: 16 June 2011 (India); 17 June 2011 (International)
- Running time: 125 minutes
- Country: India
- Language: Malayalam
- Budget: ₹4 crore (US$430,000)

Rathinirvedam is a 2011 Indian Malayalam-language erotic drama film directed by T. K. Rajeev Kumar and produced by Revathy Kalamandhir. Starring Shwetha Menon and Sreejith Vijay. It is a remake of the 1978 film of the same name, which itself was based on the novel of the same name written by P. Padmarajan. The film was produced by G. Suresh Kumar under the banner of Revathy Kalamandhir. It stars Shweta Menon in the role of Rathi, and Sreejith in the role of Pappu. In the film, Teenager Pappu's neighbour, Rathi, has acted as his elder sister since they were kids; Pappu has been in love with her forever, but she's consistently dismissed his advances as boyish pranks.

Principal photography took place at the Onnattukara area of Kayamkulam and Mavelikkara regions, where the story is primarily set.

== Plot ==
Pappu is a teenage boy who has just completed his high school board exams and is staying at his mother's ancestral home in a rural village while awaiting his results. With idle time on his hands, he develops an intense adolescent infatuation and fixation on Rathi, a 22-year-old woman living next door. Rathi has known Pappu since childhood and has always treated him affectionately as a younger brother.

Pappu begins following Rathi, watching her daily activities, and awkwardly expressing his romantic feelings. At first, Rathi dismisses his advances as childish pranks and teases him to grow up. However, Pappu’s obsession deepens, causing visible emotional distress. Concerned villagers and both families notice the situation. Fearing social scandal, the families strictly forbid Pappu and Rathi from meeting or speaking to each other. The forced separation intensifies Pappu’s desperation. Moved by his suffering and realizing her own feelings have shifted from sisterly affection to romantic attraction, Rathi secretly arranges a meeting with him on a stormy, rainy night at the local Sarppakkavu (snake shrine).

In the pouring rain, Rathi accepts Pappu’s love and the two share a passionate intimate encounter. Afterward, overwhelmed by guilt and fear of the consequences, Rathi is bitten by a cobra while leaving the grove. To avoid a public scandal that could destroy both families and Pappu’s future, she limps home silently and only then calls for help. She is rushed to the hospital but does not survive. The next morning, as Pappu heads to bus stop to leave for college with his father, he sees Rathi’s body being carried by her family. Devastated, he breaks down in tears while his father comforts him as they board the bus and depart.

== Cast ==
- Shwetha Menon as Rathi
- Sreejith Vijay as Pappu
- Manianpilla Raju as Pattalam Maman
- Shammi Thilakan as Krishnan Nair
- Guinness Pakru as Kochummini
- K. P. A. C. Lalitha as Narayani
- Maya Viswanath as Bharathi
- Shobha Mohan as Saraswathy
- Master Ananthapadmanabhan as Govindan
- Baby Ammu as Kunchi
- Baby Meera as Shanthi

== Reception ==
=== Box office ===
The film was made at a low budget of ₹1.40 crore made a distribution share of ₹2.5 crore (US$270,000) and a satellite right of ₹1.75 crore (US$190,000). Rathinirvedam was one of the top grossed film of the year, compared to its low cost.

== Soundtrack ==
All lyrics are written by Murukan Kattakada; all music is composed by M. Jayachandran.

No.	Title	Artist(s)	Length
1.	"Chempakappoonkattile"	Sudeep Kumar
2.	"Kannoram Chinkaaram"	Shreya Ghoshal
3.	"Madhumaasa Mounaraagam"	Shreya Ghoshal
4.	"Mazhavillaano"	M. Jayachandran, Karthika Vaidyanathan
5.	"Naattuvazhiyile"	Nikhil Raj

== Awards ==
2011 Kerala State Film Awards

- Won, Best Male Singer - Sudheep Kumar – "Chembakapoonkavile"
- Won, Best Female Singer - Shreya Ghoshal – "Kannoram Chingaram"
