= Living Together (2011 film) =

- Film poster
- Directed by: Fazil
- Written by: Fazil
- Produced by: Pilakandy Mohammed Ali
- Starring: Hemanth Menon; Sshivada; Sreejith; Nedumudi Venu; Innocent
- Cinematography: Anandakuttan
- Edited by: Saajan
- Music by: M. Jayachandran
- Production company: Pilakandy Films International
- Distributed by: Playhouse
- Release date: 19 February 2011
- Country: India
- Language: Malayalam

Living Together is a 2011 Malayalam supernatural romance film written and directed by Fazil. The cast is all new faces. The lead roles have been played by Hemanth Menon and Sshivada. Menaka Suresh made her 24-year long comeback through this film in Malayalam cinema industry. The film features a musical score by C. Rajamani and songs by M. Jayachandran.

== Cast ==
- Hemanth Menon as Hemachandran
- Sshivada as Shyama
- Sreejith Vijay as Niranjan, Hemachandran's friend
- Jinoop as Bavappan, Hemachandran's friend
- Nedumudi Venu as Vasudevan Kartha, Shyama's grandfather
- Menaka Suresh Kumar as Valsala, Hemachandran's mother
- Innocent as Krishnaprasad Kartha, Shyama's uncle.
- Bindu Panicker as Vasanthi, Krishnaprasad's wife
- Anoop Chandran as Manikantan, an adopted family member.
- James Pottackal as Neighbor
- Lakshmipriya as Manikantan's wife
- Darshak Sundar as Neighbour
- Irfan Ziraj as Neighbour

== Soundtrack ==
The film features a musical score by C. Rajamani and songs by M. Jayachandran. The lyrics are written by Kaithapram Damodaran Namboothiri.

No.	Title	Performer(s)	Length
1.	"Mayangoo Nee"	K. J. Yesudas
2.	"Samarasa Ranjini"	M. G. Sreekumar
3.	"Pattinte"	Vijay Yesudas
4.	"Pattinte"	Shreya Ghoshal
5.	"Kuttikurumba"	Sudeep Kumar
6.	"Ragachandran"	Karthik, Shweta Mohan
7.	"Kuttikurumba"	Anila
8.	"Ilakoo Naage"	Shweta Mohan, Janardhanan Puthuserry
