= Mridula Warrier =

Indian playback singer

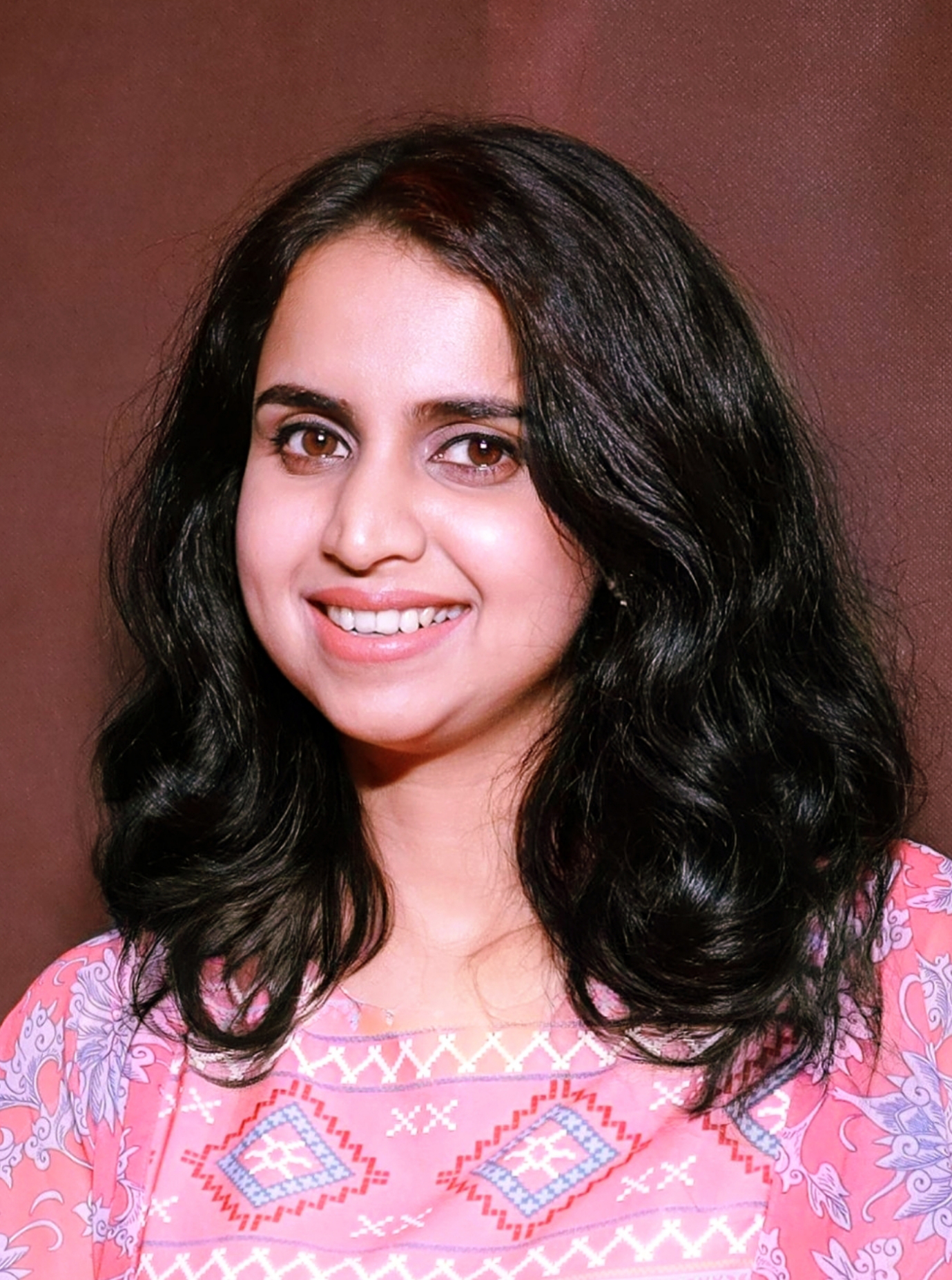

Background information
- Born: 3 May 1987 (age 39); Koyilandy, Kerala, India
- Genres: Playback singing, Carnatic music, Hindustani music
- Years active: 2007 – present
- Spouse: Dr.Arun Warrier (m. 2013)

Mridula Varier is a South Indian playback singer from Koyilandy, Kerala. She started her career as a playback singer in the Malayalam movie Big B in 2007. She has also recorded songs for Tamil, Telugu and Kannada films. She has won the prestigious Kerala State Award in 2023 and Special Jury Award in 2014 .

== Early life ==
Mridula Varier was born to P. V. Ramankutty Varier and M. T. Vijayalakshmy in Kozhikode. At the age of four, she started learning music and participated in music contests with her brother Jaideep Varier. She completed her bachelor's degree in Electronics Engineering from KMCT College of Engineering in 2009.

== Personal life ==
She married Dr. Arun Varier on 7 January 2013. She has a daughter named Maithreyi Varier born on 11 June 2016 .

== Career ==
=== Television contests ===
She started participating in television music contests right from school days. In 2004, she participated in Saptaswarangal, a musical contest on Asianet, and was awarded the first runner-up. In 2005, she participated in Onnam Raagam, a musical contest on Doordarshan and won the first prize. In 2010 she won 1st Runner Up title in season five of Idea Star Singer.

=== Reality shows ===
- 2004 - Sapthaswarangal on Asianet - 1st Runner Up.
- 2005 - Onnam Raagam on Doordarshan - Winner.
- 2005 - Gandharvasangeetham on Kairali TV - Winner.
- 2006 - Super Star on Amrita TV - 3rd Runner Up.
- 2007 - Star of Stars on Asianet Plus - Winner.
- 2010 - Idea Star Singer on Asianet - 1st Runner Up.
- 2022 -2024 Top Singer (TV series) on Flowers- Judge

== Awards ==
Kerala State Film Awards:

- 2013 - Special Jury Award - Singing (Movie : Kalimannu & Song : Laali Laali)
- 2022 - Best Singer (Movie : Pathonpatham Noottandu & Song : Mayilpeeli Ilakunnu)

Filmfare Awards South:

- 2023 - Best Female Playback Singer - Malayalam (Movie : Pathonpatham Noottandu & Song : Mayilpeeli Ilakunnu)

South Indian International Movie Awards:

- 2014 - Best Female Playback Singer - Malayalam (Movie : Kalimannu & Song : Laali Laali)
- 2023 - Best Female Playback Singer - Malayalam (Movie : Pathonpatham Noottandu & Song : Mayilpeeli Ilakunnu)

Asianet Film Awards:

- 2014 - Best Female Playback Singer 2013 for Kalimannu (Song-Laali Laali)

Mazhavil Music Awards:

- 2023 - Best Female Playback Singer - (Movie : Sundari Gardens & Song : Madhura Jeevaragam and Movie : Pathonpatham Noottandu & Song : Mayilpeeli Ilakunnu)

Kerala Film Critics Association Awards:

- 2023 - Best Female Playback Singer - (Movie : Kirkkan & Song : Kalame)

Vanitha Film Awards:

- 2014 - Best Female Playback Singer 2013 for Kalimannu (Song-Laali Laali)

Other awards:

- 2011 - Rotary Club of Calicut - Rotary Vocational Excellence Award for Music
- 2012 - Aimfill - Inspire Film Awards - Best Female Singer 2012(Oh Marimayan ) for Ivan Megharoopan
- 2013 - CACSS (Creative Arts and Cultural Service Sangam) Film Awards 2013 - Best Female Singer 2012 for 916 (film) and Ivan Megharoopan
- 2013 - Nana Film Awards 2013 - Best Female Playback for Kalimannu
- 2014 - CERA BIG Malayalam Music Awards (92.7 BIG FM) - Most Promising Singer 2013 for Kalimannu and Vishudhan
- 2014 - JaiHind TV Film Awards'14 - Best Female Singer for Kalimannu (Song-Laali Laali)
- 2014 - Swaralaya-Eenam Awards'14
- 2014 - Vayalar Ramavarma Film Awards'14 - Best Female Singer for Kalimannu (Song-Laali Laali)
- 2014 - KANNUR VISION & SMARTSA CREATION PRESENTS MIR FILM AWARDS 2013 - Best Female Singer for Kalimannu (Song-Laali Laali)
- 2014 - Amrita TV Film Awards'14 - Best Female Singer for Kalimannu (Song-Laali Laali)
- 2015 - Expatriates Film and Arts Awards "EFA Awards 2015" - "Voice of the Year" for Best Singer of the year 2014.
- 2017 - 3rd edition of Indywood Film Carnival 2017 "Best Singer-Female"
- 2019 - Satyajit Ray Film Society International Short Film Awards "Best Singer-Female"
- 2019 - ACV JOHNSON MUSIC AWARDS 2019 "Best Duet" for Ira (film) (Song-Oru Mozhi Oru Mozhi Parayam)
- 2020 - Lions Club International District 318e Film Awards "Youth Icon-2020"

== Discography ==
=== As composer ===
==== Albums ====
Year	Title	Composer	Composer	Language
2020	Thraana	Mridula	Santhosh Varma	Malayalam

=== Malayalam ===
Year	No	Song	Film	Music	Co-singer(s)
2007	1	Oru Vakkum Mindathey	Big B	Alphonse Joseph	Alphonse Joseph
2007	2	Oh Maariya	Goal	Vidyasagar	Job Kurian
2012	3	Chenthaamara theno	916	M. Jayachandran	Haricharan
2012	4	Kannanthali Kaaviley	Ezham Sooryan	M. Jayachandran	Nikhil
2012	5	O marimayan kaviyalle	Ivan Megharoopan	Sharreth	Krishnachandran
2013	6	Oru Mezhuthiriyude	Vishudhan	Gopi Sunder	Shahabaz Aman
2013	7	Moolivarunna	Nadan	Ouseppachan	Sreeram
2013	8	Pookaitha Chendupol Oru	Good Bad & Ugly	M.G.Sreekumar	Sachin Warrier
2013	9	Aliveni churulveni	Kadhaveedu	M. Jayachandran	Madhu Balakrishnan
2013	10	Parayatha Vaakin	Mugham Moottikal	Prem Kumar Vatakara	P. Jayachandran
2013	11	Ee Veiyil Kaalam	Mukham Moottikal	Prem Kumar Vatakara	Solo
2013	12	Mazhaye thoomazhaye	Pattam pole	M. Jayachandran	Haricharan
2013	13	Lalee lalee	Kalimannu	M. Jayachandran	Sudeep Kumar
2013	14	Illathalam Kaimarumbol	God for Sale	Afzal Yusuf	P. Jayachandran
2013	15	Aalolam thenolum	Ithu Pathiramanal	Afzal Yusuf	Najim Arshad
2013	16	Vaanam chuttum megham	Up & Down: Mukalil Oralundu	M. Jayachandran	Vijay Yesudas
2014	17	Ee Mizhikalin	Ormayundo Ee Mukham	Shaan Rahman	Vineeth Sreenivasan
2014	18	Nanamulla Kannil	Mithram	K A Latheef	Najim Arshad
2014	19	Kaithappoo Madathe	Mizhi Thurakku	M. Jayachandran	Solo
2014	20	Kulirumma Nalki Ean	Day Night Games	Jinosh Antony	Karthik
2014	21	Assalumundiriye	Polytechnic	Gopi Sunder	Vineeth Sreenivasan
2014	22	Kanmaniye Nee Chirichaal	Garbhasreeman	Ouseppachan	Solo
2014	23	Minnum Neelakannineyo	Ulsaha Committee	Bijibal	Kabeer
2014	24	Mazhayil Nirayum	Parankimala	Afzal Yusuf	Najim Arshad
2014	25	Manjin Kurumbu	Alice a True Story	Bijibal	Solo
2014	26	Kashmeerile Rojapoove	Salaam Kashmier	M Jayachandran	M Jayachandran
2015	27	Kumudum Poove	Rudhramadevi	Ilaiyaraaja	Solo
2015	28	Antha Purathile	Rudhramadevi	Ilaiyaraaja	Ranjini Jose, Sithara
2015	29	Chantham Thelinju	Utopiayile Rajavu	Ouseppachan	Rahul R Nath
2015	30	Ilakalil Pularveyil	One Day	Anil Bhaskar	Solo
2015	31	Ambazham Thanalitta	Oru IInd Class Yathra	Gopi Sunder	Vineeth Sreenivasan
2015	32	Mizhikalil Eeran	Oru New Generation Pani	Karthik Prakash	Solo
2015	33	Hridyathin Niramayi	100 Days of Love	Govind Menon	Vijay Yesudas
2015	34	Mazhamukhile	Saaradhi	Gopi Sunder	Najim Arshad
2015	35	Mazhathornnoru Ponkinavin	Ennu Swantham Elanjikkavu PO	Parthasaradhi	Vijay Yesudas
2015	36	Manjupeyume	Mili	Gopi Sunder	Najim Arshad
2016	37	Nilave Nilave	Celebration	Shibu Sukumaran	Najim Arshad
2016	38	Vellikkolussin	Mr. Perfect	Devi Sri Prasad	Solo
2017	39	Etho Mukil Thumbil	Maithili Veendum Varunnu	Nisanth Thapasya	Sooraj Santhosh
2017	40	Hooriya	Jannath	R A Shafeer	Solo
2017	41	Karalin Irulin	Stethoscope	Sivaganga	Solo
2017	42	Aalolam	Himalayathile Kashmalan	Aravind Chandrasekhar	Solo
2017	43	Kannadaykalle	Thank You Vey Much	Reju Joseph	Reju Joseph
2017	44	Ora Jupuju	Take It Easy	Jithu Thampuran	Solo
2018	45	Oru Mozhi Oru Mozhi Parayam	Ira	Gopi Sunder	Vijay Yesudas
2018	46	Ethoru Sooryan	Ottakoru Kaamukan	Vishnu Mohan Sithara	Solo
2018	47	Maanathe	Oru Kuttanadan Blog	Sreenath Sivasankaran	Vijay Yesudas
2018	48	Ariyathe En Mizhikalil	Mangalyam Thanthunanena	S. Sankar's	Vijay Yesudas
2018	49	Ee Varantha Neela	Ente Sakhavu	Nikhil Prabha	Solo
2018	50	Thaane Mizhiyoram	Samadhanathinte Vellaripravukal	Arun Kumaran	Najim Arshad
2018	51	Irumizhiyil	Thenichayum Peerangipadayum	Thej Mervin	Najim Arshad
2018	52	Sagara Thirakal	Sakhavinte Priyasakhi	Harikumar Hare Ram	Solo
2019	53	Omanathinkal	Children's Park	Arun Raj	Karthik
2019	54	Kannathumbi	Children's Park	Arun Raj	Vijay Yesudas, Rimi Tomy
2019	55	Etho Rappoovil	Thelivu	Kallara Gopan	P Jayachandran
2019	56	Vellimukil Chilludanjatho	Evidey	Ouseppachan	Nikhil Mathew, Amal Antony, Reena Murali
2019	57	Chandaminangiya Malayude	Evidey	Ouseppachan	Manoj K. Jayan, Nikhil Mathew, Amal Antony, Reena Murali
2019	58	Virunnu Vannu Madhavam	Thureeyam	Sibu Sukumaran	Najim Arshad
2019	59	Nallidaya	Thakkol	M Jayachandran	Nivas
2019	60	Aalam Niranjulla	Neeyum Njanum	Vinu Thomas	Solo
2020	61	Rathrimazha	Porkkalam	Sunil Pallippuram	Vidhu Prathap
2020	62	Manassake	Story 48 Hours	Raavan	Najim Arshad
2020	63	Kannaram Pothi	Bhoomiyile Manohara Swakaryam	Sachin Balu	Vijay Yesudas
2020	64	Enthinen Pranayame	Bhoomiyile Manohara Swakaryam	Sachin Balu	Solo
2021	65	Aayiram Thara Deepangal	STAR	Ranjin Raj	Solo
2021	66	Peeli Vakakal	Janvi	Ram Surendar	K. S. Harisankar
2021	67	Aarunee Aarunee	Maddy enna Madhavan	Hesham Abdul Wahab	Jazil
2022	68	Vellamadichavare	MAAHI	Raghupathi	Solo
2022	69	Madhura Jeeva Ragam	Sundari Gardens	Alphons Joseph	Solo
2022	70	Paaduvaan	Sundari Gardens	Alphons Joseph	Alphons Joseph
2022	71	Sooryamsame	Sundari Gardens	Alphons Joseph	Solo
2022	72	Mayilpeeli Ilakunnu	Pathonpatham Noottandu	M. Jayachandran	K. S. Harisankar
2023	73	Neeyo Njano	Mindiyum Paranjum	Sooraj S. Kurup	Sooraj S. Kurup
2023	74	Neehaaram	Enthada Saji	William Francis	Arshad Rahim
2023	75	Amma	Divorce	Sachin Balu	Smitha Ambu
2023	76	Midhunam Madhuram	Anuragam (2023 film)	Joel Johns	Vidhu Prathap
2023	77	Nerukayil Nin Nerukayil	Neeraja	Sachin Shankor Mannath	Sachin Shankor Mannath
2023	78	Kaalame	Kirkkan	Manikandan Ayyappa	Mohammed Maqbool Mansoor
2023	79	Urumaal Thunnalizhakalaayu	Munna	Sibu Sukumaran	Vijesh Gopal
2023	80	Madhuvarnna Pynkili	Munna	Sibu Sukumaran	Vijesh Gopal & Ranjith Sridhar
2023	81	Mindaathe Thammil	Rahel Makan Kora	Kailas Menon	Arvind Nair
2023	82	Chendumulla	Ohh Cinderella	M. G. Sreekumar	M. G. Sreekumar
2023	83	Mouna Sundari	Marivillin Gopurangal	Vidyasagar (composer)	Karthik (singer)
2024	84	Varminnal	Raastha	Avin Mohan Sithara	Vineeth Sreenivasan
2024	85	Orupon Chimizhile	Oraparakallyanavishesham	Harikumar Hareram	Sunil Kumar
2024	86	Vellaram Kannulla Mane	Mrudhu Bhave Dhruda Kruthye	Saajan Madhav	Naresh Iyer
2024	87	Neeharam Nilamazhayil	Guardian Angel	Ram Surendar	Madhu Balakrishnan
2024	88	Kathileeran	Thankamani (film)	William Francis	V. Devanand
2024	89	Khalbile Thene	Kuruvi Pappa	Pradeep Tom	Madhu Balakrishnan
2024	90	Azhakaayi Ente Arikil	Oru Smart Phone Pranayam	Prasanth Mohan MP	Sreekanth Hariharan

=== Tamil ===
Year	Song	Film	Music	Co-singer(s)
2016	Kadhal Kolluthadi	Ennul Aayiram	Gopi Sunder	Najim Arshad
2019	Mukkuthi Mukkuthi	Mamangam	M. Jayachandran	Solo
2022	Nee Yaaro	Thudikkum Karangal (2022)	Y Raghav Prasad	Anand Aravindakshan

=== Kannada ===
Year	Song	Film	Music	Co-singer(s)
2015	Kelamma Chinnamma	Mandya to Mumbai	Charan Raj	Haricharan
2021	Ambaari Prema	Premam Poojyam	Dr. Raghavendra BS	Armaan Malik

=== Telugu ===
Year	Song	Film	Music	Co-singer(s)
2019	Mukkera Mukkera	Mamangam	M. Jayachandran	Solo

=== TV serials ===
Year	Serial	Channel	Song	Music	Co-singers
2017	Vanambadi (TV series)	Asianet (TV channel)	Chenkadali Koombinullil	M. Jayachandran	Solo
2018	Swathi Nakshatram Chothi	Zee Keralam	Mylanchi Monjulla, Maanathe Mettilu	M. Jayachandran	Solo
2021	Pranayavarnangal	Zee Keralam	Mazhanananja Ravil	Alphons Joseph	Arvind Venugopal

=== Albums ===
Year	Album	Song	Co-singer(s)	Music	Lyrics
2023	Ninavai-Oru Kutti Pranayakadha	Oru Pattu Padan	Solo	Dr. Anas Kareem	Dr. Girish Udinukkaran
2023	Maleyam (Krishna Devotional)	Oru Nokku Kananayi	Solo	Arjun V Akshaya	Dr. Thaara Jeyashankar
2022	Vishudha Kurunnukal	Thumanjin Kudilayi	Solo	JM(Jackson Mathew)	JM(Jackson Mathew)
2022	Christian Devotional	Orikkal Orikkal	Solo	Ps Tigi George	Ps Tigi George
2022	Short Film - Section 34	Thiraye Thiraye	Solo	Midhun Malayalam	Sandeep Sudha
2022	Marian Devotional Song	Nanmz Niranja Mathave	Solo	Jose M Thomas	Jose M Thomas
2022	WCD - Govt. of Kerala Project	Sukrithamayi	Solo	V R Ranjith	K V Sabarimani
2022	Hindu Devotional Song	Thrukkayyil Venna Tharam	Solo	Premkumar Mumbai	Mankombu Gopalakrishnan
2022	Nin Sanidhyam En Sangeetham	Abhouma Sangeetham	Solo	Annie Thankachan	Annie Thankachan
2022	Onam Song	Thumbakal Thusharamenthum	Solo	Bharanikavu Ajayakumar	Bharanikkavu Premkrishna
2021	Nakshathrappookal - Christmas Song	Thoomanju Thookum	Solo	Salgin Kalapura	Sumod Cheriyan
2021	Onam Album	Kakkappoovinu	Solo	Mohan Sithara	Sethumadhavan
2021	Red FM Malayalam	Kanavazhikalil	K. S. Harisankar	Alphons Joseph	Dhanya Suresh
2021	Christian Devotional Song	Snehathin Uravidam	Solo	Anish Koothattukulam	Anish Koothattukulam
2021	Rajeevam - Hindu Devotional	Enne Nee Ariyilla	Solo	Sudheer Warrier	P V Narayanan
2021	Tamil Single Album	Manasukkulla	Solo	Thrissur Ravivarma	Anoop Warrier
2021	Onam Song	En Kanave	Najim Arshad	Sony Varghese	Shiju S Vismaya
2021	Poem : Vediyettu Veezhunna Pranayam	Pranayathinu ennum pakaram	Solo	Sachin Shankor Mannath	Madhu Vasudevan
2021	Onam Song	Onathumpee	Solo	Sudheer Warrier	Girija G Warrier
2021	Christian Devotional Song	Daivanae Nin Adiyanitha	Solo	Celine Chacko	Celine Chacko
2020	Marian Devotional Song	Chandrodayam Ne Chandraodayam	Solo	Fr Mathew Payyappilly	Rosina Peety
2020	Christian Devotional Song	Ente Mizhikal Niranjeedumbol	Solo	Joseph George	Siby Aloommoottil
2020	Christmas Song	Aaba Pithavin Ponnunni	Solo	Ram Surendar	Jithesh Chemparathy
2020	Christian Devotional Song	Enneshu Naadha	Solo	Pranam Kamlakhar	Amchal Pavithran
2020	Lord Shiva Devotional Song	Vaikundadipane	Solo	Venu Anchal	T R Pratheep Kumar
2020	Nizal Pole - Holycommunion Song	Melle Onnu Kannadachal	Solo	Fr Mathew Payyappilly	Fr Mathew Payyappilly
2019	Kurushil Ninakayi - Album	Anayam	Solo	Dellish Vamattam	Dellish Vamattam
2018	Christian Devotional Song	En Priyane	Solo	Binoj Mani	Binoj Mani
2018	Madhava Geethika	Radhe Ganasyama	Solo	Sayooj Balakrishnan	Rajesh Kurumathur
2018	Christian Devotional Song	Karunya Deepame	Solo	George Mathew	Jojo Alex
2018	Christian Devotional Song	Yahovaye Njan	Solo	Rev George John	Rev George John
2017	Oru Kavitha Pole	Kaatharayam Gopika	Solo	Sandeep Karunakaran	Sandeep Karunakaran
2017	Amen	Kanneerunangiya	Solo	Nelson Peter	Joel Pandaraparambil
2017	Album Song	Nakshathramai	Solo	SZainul Abid	Rathnabooshan Kalarikkal
2016	Ponnavani Pattukal	Thumbee Vaa	P. Jayachandran	S R Suraj	Syam Enath
2016	Prakasham	Pulariyil Viriyum	Solo	Ajay Joseph	Fr.Antony Paul Keerampilly
2016	Romantic Song	Ormakal Ormakal	G. Venugopal	Rajesh Raman	G.Nisikanth
2015	Akalee- Romantic Album	Aaro Etho Ravil	Najim Arshad	Jithin J Menon	Jithin J Menon
2015	Music Mojo - KappaTV	Kannodu	Solo	Job Kurian	Engandiyoor Chandrasekharan
2015	EESOW-Christian Devotional	Nin Viralal Onnu Thodan	Biju Narayanan	Nelson Peter	Manoj Elavungal
2015	REVIVE-Christian Devotional	Karunyadeepame	Solo	George Mathew Cheriyathh	Jojo Alexander
2014	Nirapournnami	Pattu moolunnorammaye	Solo	Sivaraman Nagalasherry	Suryasanu
2014	Gazal Album : Neeyallenkil Mattaraanu Sakhee	Mandhasameeranai Charathananjathum	Solo	Umbayee	East Coast Vijayan
2014	Sparsam-God Album	Nirathinkal Va Vave	Solo	Fr.Shinto Edassery CST	Fr.Shinto Edassery CST
2014	Sparsam-God Album	Kanmani Vaayo Kanmani Nee	Solo	Fr.Shinto Edassery CST	Fr.Shinto Edassery CST
2014	Onam with Eenam	Kanavilum Kanavilumraasa	Jaideep Varier	Rajesh Raman	G.Nisikanth
2014	Akale	Aaro Etho Raavil	Najim Arshad	Jithin J Menon	Jithin J Menon
2014	Maayathe	Thaanirangumo Pranayame	Najim Arshad	Ronnie Raphael	Joboy Olattupuram
2014	Shruthinandanam	Aduadu Aduadu	G. Venugopal	Deepankuran	Unknown
2014	Kannaente Munnil	Parvanamem	Solo	Lalu Sukumaran	Ushanth Thavath
2014	Symphony of Love	Kavitha Moolunna Thooval	Solo	Michaell Jose	Michael Jose
2014	Kalabhacharthu	Ida Nenchileriyunna	Solo	Perumthuruthu Madhv	Unknown
2014	Kalabhacharthu	Kalabhacharthaniyuma	Solo	Perumthuruthu Madhv	Unknown
2014	Njanum Neeyum	Nizhalum Nilavum	Vijay Yesudas	Suresh Vasudev	Rajesh Kanjirampara
2014	Thozhukayyode	Ayi Girinandini	Solo	Santhosh Varma	East Coast Vijayan
2014	Thozhukayyode	Adharam Madhuram	Solo	Santhosh Varma	East Coast Vijayan
2014	Thozhukayyode	Harinarayana Govinda	Solo	Santhosh Varma	East Coast Vijayan
2014	Kadaksham	Amme Churakulangara	Solo	Sarath Mohan	Sarath Mohan
2014	Kadaksham	Eka Devi	Solo	Sarath Mohan	Sarath Mohan
2014	Pranayaraagam	Unknown	Solo	Anshad Thrissur	Jaleel K Bava
2014	Pranayam Ee Sangeetham	Unknown	Solo	Sarath Mohan	Sarath Mohan
2013	En Naadhane	Maanathoru	Solo	Sarath Mohan	Sarath Mohan
2013	Mazhanilavu	Unknown	Najim Arshad	Afzal Yusuf	Asha Sabeena
2013	Vazhimara Pookal	Katte Pookatte	Solo	Ramesh	L.V. Babu
2013	Jesus Forever	Gethsemane	Solo	K J Stanley	Dr Sebastian Mankoottathil
2013	Light MusicDoordarshan	Manasiinte Manathu	Reju Joseph	Perumbavoor G. Raveendranath	Chittoor Gopi
2013	Light MusicDoordarshan	Aadhya Mazha Thumba	Solo	Perumbavoor G. Raveendranath	P. K. Gopi
2013	Light MusicDoordarshan	Thrikkakara Appante	Reju Joseph	Perumbavoor G. Raveendranath	Thankan Thiruvattar
