= Kalimannu =

- Theatrical poster
- Directed by: Blessy
- Written by: Blessy
- Produced by: Thomas Thiruvalla
- Starring: Swetha Menon; Biju Menon; Suhasini Maniratnam; Prashant Nair
- Cinematography: Satheesh Kurup
- Edited by: Raja Mohammed
- Music by: M. Jayachandran
- Production company: Cherummuttadathu Films
- Distributed by: Kochin Talkies
- Release date: 22 August 2013
- Country: India
- Language: Malayalam

Kalimannu (transl. Clay) is a 2013 Indian Malayalam drama film written and directed by Blessy and starring Swetha Menon in the lead role and Biju Menon, Suhasini in Major Supporting roles. Inspired by the Puranic story of Abhimanyu and his mother Subhadra, the film portrays the relationship of the protagonist with her baby, before and after it is born. Swetha Menon's real-life delivery was shot live on camera for the film.

== Plot ==
Meera is a club dancer in the dark streets of Mumbai, who like all performers of the local area, aspires to be on the screen someday. She gets used by film producers who promise her roles in their films, but fail to do so later. Frustrated, she even thinks of ending her life. But the unexpected arrival of Shyam, a taxi driver, changes the course of her life. He marries her and makes for a lovely husband. Her career also starts looking up as she progresses to being a popular item dancer and then gets cast as the heroine in a film. But, on the day of the preview of her debut film, Shyam is involved in a fatal road accident and declared brain dead. Meera who is left all alone again, thinks of donating Shyam's organs to people in need. She wants to have his child through artificial insemination. She fights for her parenting rights as the technique would have created much uproar in the media.

== Cast ==
- Shweta Menon as Meera, a bar dancer turned budding actress
- Biju Menon as Meera's Husband Syam, a Taxi Driver
- Suhasini as Sophy
- Sabaina Menon
- Valsala Menon as Paatti
- Prashant Nair as Vivek nair
- Antony Thekkek as Doctor
- Sunil Shetty as himself
- Priyadarshan as himself
- Malini Sivaraman as Shweta Menon's friend

== Production ==
The story of Kalimannu came into Blessy's mind during a trip to Dubai after completing Pranayam (2011). During his travel, a radiant thought flew in his mind, that of a baby in the womb talking to its mother. And the frame initiated the spark for a film that unfolds the relationship between a mother and her baby in the womb.

Non-definite scripting pattern was used for the film. Principal photography started even before the completion of scripting and casting. In order to cover various stages of pregnancy, the film was shot in different schedules, beginning in the first week of August. The film was shot for many months, throughout Swetha's pregnancy. Swetha's delivery was filmed in late September from a hospital in Kochi where she was admitted. The crew stayed in the hospital for nearly a week and a footage lasting for twenty minutes was shot from the delivery room. Swetha's husband, Blessy and two cinematographers for the film were present in the labour room after prior permission, with three cameras placed in the delivery room to capture the moment. It was for the first time that an Indian film used the footages of a natural childbirth.

== Controversies ==
The delivery filming caused a "culture shock" in Kerala. The debate began when Kerala Legislative Assembly Speaker G. Karthikeyan criticised Shwetha Menon for allowing her delivery to be captured live on camera. The speaker added that some years ago, a movie titled The Birth was screened at theatres across Kerala. However, the film was tagged as a medical movie, and so did not face any problem. Since Blessy is promoting Kalimannu as a commercial movie, it might have to face the heat since it might have a negative impact on the family audience. Karthikeyan also expressed his surprise why cultural and women's rights organisations are not coming out against this. A few days after Karthikeyan made his comments, BJP Mahila Morcha activists announced that they would stall the screening of the movie in Kerala, alleging that Shwetha Menon and Blessy are "exploiting motherhood for commercial purposes" by incorporating the actress's delivery. Shobha Surendran, Mahila Morcha leader said at a press meet: "We urge the Censor Board and the state government not to allow its screening here. Otherwise, the activists of the Mahila Morcha will stall the film's release. Chief Minister Oommen Chandy should intervene in the matter at the earliest and should bring in a law to prohibit such films, which infringe on the morality of the common people. As per the reports, it is learnt that the depiction of Shweta Menon's motherhood in the movie is so objectionable that it offends the morality of all the right-thinking women. The movie is not only polluting the family values and the rich cultural heritage of ancient Bharata but also legitimising a woman's efforts to sell her moral values for making money and attaining cheap publicity. I will not be surprised if she plans to deliver her second baby at a public place like festival venues as part of making money. This is totally unacceptable for the right-thinking society and if the director and crew go ahead with the release, they will have to face stiff resistance from the Kerala society." The film was also condemned by the Kerala Film Exhibitors' Federation who said that they will boycott the movie if Blessy includes the delivery scene. Liberty Basheer, president of the federation, said, "We are concerned about the movie's content. If the director includes the delivery scene, we will definitely boycott it," However, the Film Employees' Federation of Kerala (FEFKA) was all support for director Blessy. Speaking to the media, B. Unnikrishnan, general secretary, FEFKA said, "The controversy is baseless. This is not the first time that a delivery is being canned. Moreover, we don't know how he has visualised it. There is a censor board which looks into such matters. There are specific norms that have to be followed while portraying women in movies. If the board feels women are shown in a poor light, it will definitely censor it. Blessy is a director with a good track record. Let's just wait for the final output."

== Critical reception ==
Kalimannu opened to mixed and positive responses upon release. Deccan Chronicle's reviewer commented: "All said and done ‘Kalimannu’ is a well-made film, though not in the league of Blessy's other classics. Though it doesn't live up to its hype, the movie can be prescribed for an engaging watch." Sharikha C. of The Hindu said, "With a subject that was stretched beyond its one- hour worth of content, it is the audience who writhe in pain over Blessy's ‘labour’ of love. Kalimannu is that point of realisation for the Malayali audience that the director of some of the most poetic films in recent times (Kazcha, Thanmathra, Brahmaram, and Pranayam) has, but, feet of clay." Reporter TV's first review says that "Kalimannu is a good movie and the movie contains lot many social messages".

== Soundtrack ==
Kalimannu

Soundtrack album by M. Jayachandran
- Released: 2013
- Genre: Feature film soundtrack
- Producer: Thomas Thiruvalla

M. Jayachandran chronology
Up & Down - Mukalil Oralundu (2013)	Kalimannu (2013)	Pattam Pole (2013)

All lyrics are written by O. N. V. Kurup; all music is composed by M. Jayachandran.

No.	Title	Artist(s)	Length
1.	"Lalee Lalee"	Mridula Warrier, Sudeep Kumar
3.	"Choo Loon"	Vijay Yesudas, Suchitra
4.	"Dil Lena"	Sonu Kakkar
5.	"Ganapathi"	Haricharan
6.	"Garbharaksha"	Janaki Iyer
7.	"Meine To"	Sonu Kakkar, Sukhwinder Singh

=== Awards ===
Kerala State Film Awards

- Special Jury Award - Mridula Warrier for the song "Lalee Lalee"
