= E Valayam =

Indian Malayalam-language family film

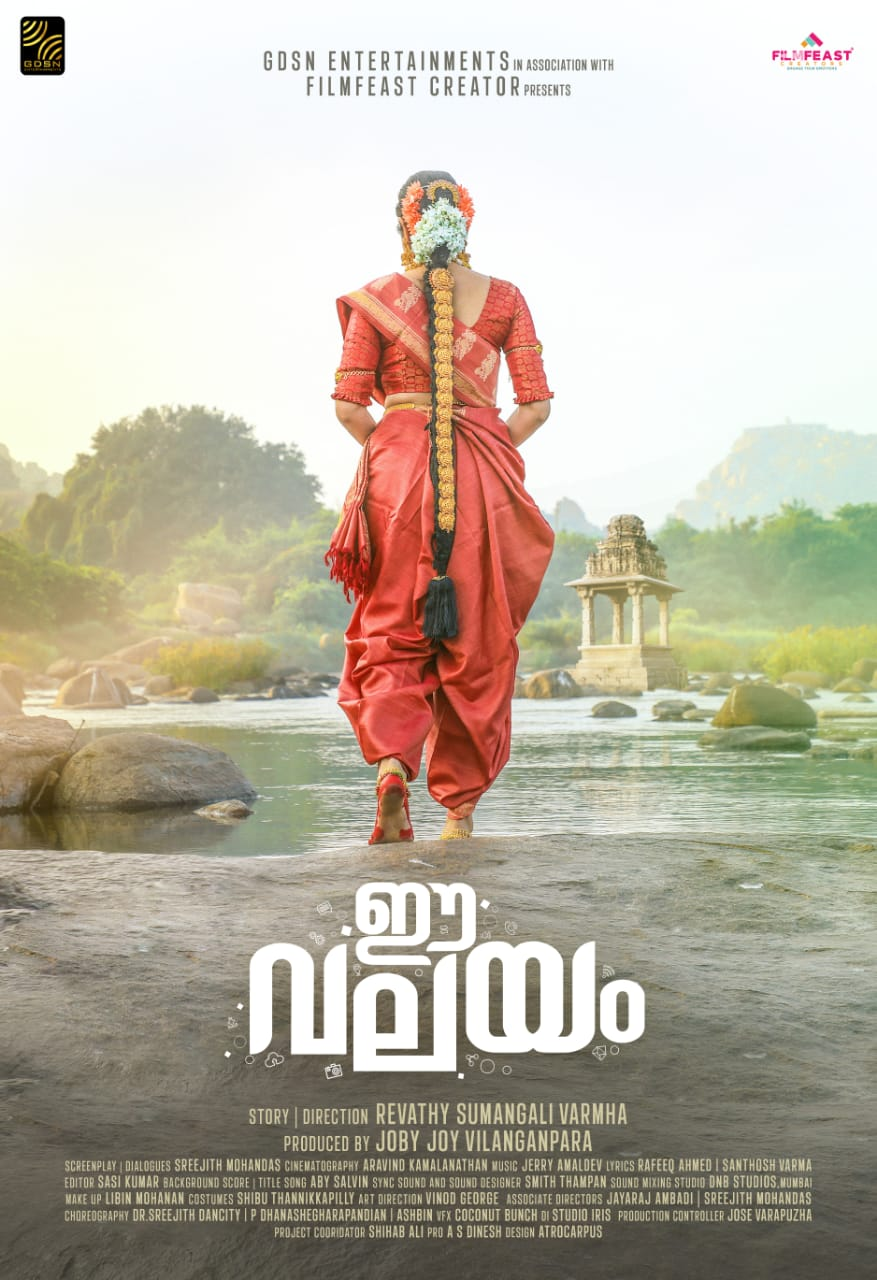
- Official release poster
- Directed by: Revathy S Varmha
- Written by: Sreejith Mohandas
- Produced by: Joby Joy Vilanganpara
- Starring: Ashly Usha, Renji Panickar, Muthumani, Nandu, Shalu Rahim
- Cinematography: Aravind Kamalanadhan
- Edited by: Sasi Kumar
- Music by: Jerry Amaldev
- Production company: GDSN Entertainments In Association with Filmfeast Creators
- Release date: 13 June 2025
- Country: India
- Language: Malayalam

E Valayam is a 2025 Indian, Malayalam- language family entertainment movie directed by Revathy S Varmha. The screenplay was written by Sreejith Mohandas. It was produced by Joby Joy Vilanganpara through GDSN Entertainments In association with Director Revathy S Varmha's Filmfeast Creators. The director introduced a new face actress Ashly Usha for the leading role. Other actors are Renji Panicker, Nandu, Muthumani, Shalu Rahim, Vinod Thomas, Anees Abraham, Madhav elayadam etc.,

The songs are composed by the Indian music director Jerry Amaldev, with lyrics by Rafeeq Ahmed and Santhosh Varma.

== Cast ==
- Ashly Usha as Nilaavu (Neeli)
- Ranji Panicker as Vinayan
- Nandu as Ananthan
- Muthumani as Anitha
- Shalu Rahim as Nirmal
- Anees Abraham as Jalaja
- Vinod Thomas as Baiju
- Kumar Sethu as School Principal
- Geetha Maathan as Savithri
- Akshay Prasanth as Rayan
- Sidhra Mubasheer as Monica
- Sandra Nair as Madona
- Geophy Mathew as Dr. Rahna
- Jayanthi as Manju
- Madhav elayadam as Akash

== Soundtrack ==
There are four songs in the movie. Three songs were composed by Jerry Amaldev. One song (Neelakkuyile) and background music by Aby Salvin Thomas. Lyrics by Rafeeq Ahmed and Santhosh varma

One song from the movie was shot in Hampi, the UNESCO-recognized World Heritage Site located in Karnataka. The song was Originally composed in the 18th Century by one of the pioneering composers in Indian classical Carnatic music Oothukkadu Venkata Kavi. In the movie, the same song was rearranged by Jerry Amaldev, it is a mixture of Classical Carnatic with Fusion.

Music rights are owned by Manorama Music and the Singers are Lathika, Madhu Balakrishnan, Sangeetha Sajith (Sangeetha Chennai), Manjari, Durga Viswanath, and Vinod udayanapuram.

=== Track listing ===
No	Title	Lyrics	Music composer	Singer(s)	Length
1	Vellodin Kingi kettiya	Rafeeq Ahmad	Jerry Amaldev	Durga Viswanath, Vinod Udayanapuram	3.36
2	Kalamam Nadhi Alakale	Rafeeq Ahmad	Jerry Amaldev	Lathika, Madhu Balakrishnan	3.52
3	Manamayakkum Issai pole (Thillana)		Oothukkadu venkata kavi	Sangeetha Sajith	3.50
4	Neelakkuyile	Santhosh varma	Aby salvin Thomas	Manjari	4.50

== Grand Trailer Launch ==
The film's trailer launch was conducted in Kochi. The inauguration of the Trailer release carried by legendary athlete P. T. Usha. and social commentator Sreejith Panicker, along with the actors and technicians of the movie.

== Release ==
The movie was released on 13 June 2025.

== Reception ==
The film received positive reviews from audiences and critics like Malayala Manorama, Eenadu. etc., Malayala Manorama described "E valayam" as a timely and socially relevant family drama that effectively addresses the dangers of mobile phone addictions among teenagers. The review emphasized that the screenplay by Sreejith Mohandas and direction by Revathy S Varmha remained faithful to the theme, while also exploring family bonds and emotional struggles.

The critic noted the film avoids being preachy, instead presenting the issue of nomophobia (Smartphone addiction) in a relatable manner.

In addition to critical acclaim, the movie was well received by audiences. Group of school students and teachers attended screening together and expressed appreciation for the film's message.
