= Good Bad & Ugly =

- DVD cover
- Directed by: V R Ratheesh Ram
- Written by: Renjith gv
- Produced by: Rahul S Kumar; Karthika Mohan
- Starring: Sreejith Vijay; Meghana Raj; Basil; Sanju
- Cinematography: Venugopal
- Edited by: Arun Thomas AKD
- Music by: M. G. Sreekumar
- Production companies: Aditya Movies; Karthika Films
- Release date: 13 December 2013
- Country: India
- Language: Malayalam

Good Bad & Ugly is a 2013 Indian Malayalam-language drama film directed by V. R. Rathish, starring Sreejith Vijay and Meghana Raj in the lead roles with Basil and Sanju in supporting roles.

== Plot ==
The film revolves around three youngsters, Jeevan, Shiva, and Anwar, who travel around a city during a hartal (labour strike) in Thiruvananthapuram.

== Cast ==
- Sreejith Vijay as Jeevan
- Meghana Raj as Kavya
- Basil as Shiva
- Sanju as Anwar
- Suraj Venjaramoodu as Benz Vasu
- Krishna Kumar as Murthy Raj
- Indrans as Arogya Swamy
- Nandu as Marthandan
- Lintu Thomas as Shyama
- Kochu Preman
- Geetha Nair
- Kiran Raj
- Njekkad Rajan

== Production ==
The film is about a hartal, a labour strike. Sreejith Vijay and Meghana Raj were announced to portray the lead roles. Meghana Raj signed for the film along with several other films, including Maad Dad, Red Wine, Up & Down: Mukalil Oralundu, and a Kannada film. Basil shot for the film after his cameo in Karmayodha (2012). He was last seen in the unsuccessful Cinema Company (2012) and Kaashh (2012). Suraj Venjaramood and Krishna Kumar were also announced to be playing pivotal roles.

== Soundtrack ==
The songs were composed by M. G. Sreekumar, and the lyrics were written by Rajeev Allunkal and Sasikala Menon.

| Song title | Singer(s) | Lyricist |
|---|---|---|
| "Pookkaithachendupol" | Sachin Warrier, Mridula Warrier | Sasikala Menon |
| "Vidarum Nilaavu" | Ganga | Rajeev Alunkal |

== Release ==
The film was scheduled to release in February 2013.
