= June R =

- DVD cover
- Directed by: Revathy S. Varmha
- Written by: Revathy S. Varmha
- Based on: June R (novella) by Revathy S. Varmha
- Produced by: A. Ansari
- Starring: Jyothika; Khushbu Sundar; Saritha; Biju Menon
- Cinematography: Madhu Ambat
- Edited by: Jyothi Jayamaruthi
- Music by: Sharreth
- Production company: Ideawold 1 Celluloid
- Release date: 10 February 2006
- Running time: 120 minutes
- Country: India
- Language: Tamil

June R is a 2006 Indian Tamil-language drama film directed by Revathy S. Varmha, in her feature directorial debut. The film, based on her English novella of the same name, stars Jyothika in the title role, along with Khushbu Sundar, Saritha and Biju Menon. The soundtrack was composed by Sharreth, while Madhu Ambat was the cinematographer. The film was released on 10 February 2006. In 2009, Varmha began directing a Hindi remake titled Aap Ke Liye Hum (transl. We are there for you), which remains unreleased.

== Plot ==
June R, an orphan, was born in the month of June and hence the name. She works in an advertising agency. One day she comes across a middle-aged woman badly hurt in an accident. She is admitted to the hospital under the pretext that she is her mother, Rajalakshmi, in order to save her life.

Rajalakshmi is actually Raniammal, a widow who has strived hard to bring up her only son, Arun. Arun and his wife have plans to send Raniammal to an orphanage and settle in New York. Raniammal finds solace in June's company, who has always longed for a motherly love since childhood. June and Raniammal cherish life together.

Then Arun returns to take Raniammal back, but she refuses to go with him. Arun quarrels with June to give back his mother. Raniammal falls sick, and June decides to bring in her brother, whom she yearns to meet before dying. On visiting Rajalakshmi's hometown, June unveils the mystery behind Arun's sudden love for his mother.

Amudha, a leading lawyer aids June to legally get her new mother back. Though the court judgment favours June, fate has something else in store. June finds Raniammal is dead. Raja, a rich client of June's advertising agency, is in love with her and consoles June and takes her along with him, just the way her Raniammal had wished.

== Cast ==
- Jyothika as June. R
- Suriya as Raja (guest appearance)
- Saritha as Raniammal/Rajalakshmi
- Khushbu Sundar as Amudha, an advocate and June's friend
- Biju Menon as Arun, Raniammal's son
- Ravikumar as Raniammal's brother
- Siddharth Venugopal as Sundar, June's colleague

== Production ==
June R is the feature directorial debut of Revathy S. Varmha, previously an advertisement filmmaker. She had first published the story as a novelette in the English periodical Woman's Era and wanted to make it into a feature film. Varmha approached a Hindi film producer in Mumbai and decided that Jaya Bachchan, Tabu and Kareena Kapoor would play the lead roles in the film. However, after Varmha had a chance meeting with Jyothika and casually narrated the story to her, the actress decided it would be better made in Tamil than Hindi. Varmha said Saritha and Khushbu Sundar were the only actresses considered for the roles she and they were cast in. The lead actor of the film was kept a secret from the media until release. Cinematography was handled by Madhu Ambat, and editing by Jyothi Jayamaruthi. The film was shot at Chennai and Pondicherry. It is the first feature film produced by Ideawold 1 Celluloid, known mainly for producing advertisement commercials.

== Soundtrack ==
The soundtrack was composed by Sharreth. The song "Eano Eano" is a jazz number. The audio was launched at Green Park Hotel in Chennai on 10 September 2005 by M. Balamuralikrishna.

Track listing
No.	Title	Lyrics	Singer(s)	Length
1.	"Mazhaye Mazhaye"	Kavivarman	Hariharan
2.	"Puthu Puthu"	Na. Muthukumar	Usha Uthup, K. S. Chithra
3.	"Anbe Anbe"	Na. Muthukumar	Gayathri Varma
4.	"Eano Eano"	Na. Muthukumar	Sharreth
5.	"Rim Jim" (female version of "Mazhaye Mazhaye")	Kavivarman	Sujatha
6.	"Puthu Puthu" (version 2)	Na. Muthukumar	Usha Uthup, K. S. Chithra

== Release ==
The film was initially scheduled for release in September 2005 but was pushed back to release in the Diwali season that year so the film could be promoted more heavily. The film was also caught up when Khushbu's films were temporarily banned after her comments on pre-marital sex angered Indian political parties. It ultimately released on 10 February 2006.

== Critical reception ==
Malini Mannath of Chennai Online wrote, "It's a film on female bonding, of three women whose lives are interwoven, and who find moral support and succour in each other. But with the characters lacking depth, and the relationships not clearly defined or tackled, the story of female bonding fails to touch a chord". Malathi Rangarajan of The Hindu wrote, "Revathi Varma is the story, screenplay and dialogue writer and director of the film. Is sensitivity to issues alone enough for a maker, is the query that arises when watching June R. Logic or the lack of it (in certain sequences) irks". Cinesouth wrote, "Revathi Varma being a woman director, there was a lot of expectation to see something different. But it was like attending a feast where the banquet was not served".

== Remake ==
June R was remade by Varmha in Hindi. The film, originally titled Chassni, was later retitled Aap Ke Liye Hum, with Jaya Bachchan, Raveena Tandon, Manisha Koirala, Ayesha Takia and Ranvir Shorey starring. Production began in September 2009, but in February 2011, Tandon expressed doubts over its release.
