= Sundari Gardens =

- Release poster
- Directed by: Charlie Davis
- Written by: Charlie Davis
- Produced by: Salim Ahamed
- Starring: Aparna Balamurali; Neeraj Madhav; Sruthy Suresh
- Cinematography: Swaroop Philip
- Edited by: Sajit Unnikrishnan
- Music by: Alphons Joseph
- Production company: Allens Media
- Release date: 2 September 2022
- Running time: 111 minutes
- Country: India
- Language: Malayalam

Sundari Gardens is a 2022 Indian Malayalam-language romantic drama film written and directed by Charlie Davis and produced by Salim Ahamed under his banner Allens Media. The film features Aparna Balamurali and Neeraj Madhav in the lead roles. Its music is composed by Alphons joseph with cinematography handled by Swaroop Philip and editing by Sajit Unnikrishnan. The film directly premiered on SonyLIV on 2 September 2022.

== Cast ==
- Aparna Balamurali as Sundari Sara Mathews a.k.a. Suma
- Neeraj Madhav as Victor Paul
- Jude Anthany Joseph as Karnan Raghav
- Lakshmi Menon as Lekha Kurian
- Binu Pappu as Dr. Mahi
- Vijayaraghavan as Paul
- Sminu Sijo as Annammachi
- Kannan Sagar as Rarichan
- Babu jose as Salaam
- Adish Praveen as Kanthan
- Gowri as Jasmine
- Sruthy Suresh as Aleena
- Shiva Hariharan as Unni
- Sanju Sanichen as Sanju
- Anagha Maria Varghese as Elizabeth
- P. Sivadas as A.K Avaran
- Laali PM as Saramma
- M. Sajish as Joy
- RJ Renu as Ancy
- Arun Cherukavil as Ajith
- Rajeev as Devadathan
- Siyadh shajahan as Renji
- Jaiden Johnson as Akhshay
- Alphons Joseph
- Sithara Krishnakumar

== Production ==
The film was shot in Pala, Erattupetta, Wagamon, Kanjirappally, and Manimala.

== Music ==
The film's soundtrack was composed by Alphons Joseph while the lyrics are written by Joe Paul. The audio rights were bought by Sony Music.

Track listing
No.	Title	Lyrics	Singer(s)	Length
1.	"Madhura Jeeva Ragam"	Joe Paul	Mridula Warrier	4:19
2.	"Maya Moham"	Joe Paul	Sithara Krishnakumar, Alphons Joseph	3:21
3.	"Paaduvaan"	Joe Paul	Alphons Joseph, Mridula Warrier	3:02
4.	"Naal Haritham"	Joe Paul	Alphons Joseph	5:09
5.	"Sooryamsame"	Joe Paul	Mridula Warrier	4:01
6.	"I Wanna Fly"	Shelton Pinheiro	Mariya Alphons	1:04
7.	"Nearer My God To Thee"	Alphons Joseph, Arthur Sullivan, Lowell Mason, Sarah Fuller Flower Adams	Rosemary	1;22
Total length:				22:22

== Release ==
The film directly premiered on SonyLIV on 2 September 2022.
