= Rathinirvedam (novel) =

1970 novel by P. Padmarajan

Rathinirvedam (രതിനിർവ്വേദം)
- Author: P. Padmarajan
- Language: Malayalam
- Genre: Romance novel
- Publisher: D. C. Books
- Publication date: May 1970
- Publication place: India
- Media type: Print (Paperback)
- Pages: 59
- ISBN: 81-264-1001-9

Rathinirvedam is a Malayalam language short novel written by P. Padmarajan and published in 1970. The story revolves around a teenager who falls in love with a woman older than he is. The title translates as "venereal disenchantment" in English.

== Plot summary ==
The story takes place in Cheppattumukku village near Kayamkulam, a small village surrounded by hills and valleys. Seventeen-year-old Pappu, awaiting school results and then college, has plenty of time on hand. His trouble is adolescence, but neither his mother nor his aunt can diagnose his affection. Everything round him excites and stimulates his sexual curiosity. Twenty-two-year-old Rathi, the girl next door, has been chechi (sister) to him since he was a child. Unaware of the stirrings of his desire, she dismisses his first overtures to her as boyish pranks. But soon her feelings change. She is sympathetic to the boy's confusion and goes to the sarppakkavu (cobra-shrine) to keep a midnight assignation with Pappu. It storms and thunders while Pappu has sex with Rathi. Only then does the storm within and without subside. Aghast at what has happened, Rathi stumbles to her feet but is bitten by a cobra and dies. Next morning Pappu leaves home for college and his new life.

== Publication history ==
The novel was originally published in May 1970 and was critically well received. The novel was re-published by D. C. Books in 2005, as part of their grandhasala series, which included 12 best-selling novels.

== Film adaptations ==
Two films have been made, both based on an original screenplay by Padmarajan. The first film adaptation, directed by Bharathan and released in 1978, went on to become a large critical and commercial success. Another film adaptation, officially announced as the remake of 1978 film, was released in 2011. It was directed by T. K. Rajeev Kumar and was moderately received by critics but became a notable commercial success.
