= Parthan Mohan =

Malayalam film director (born 1986)

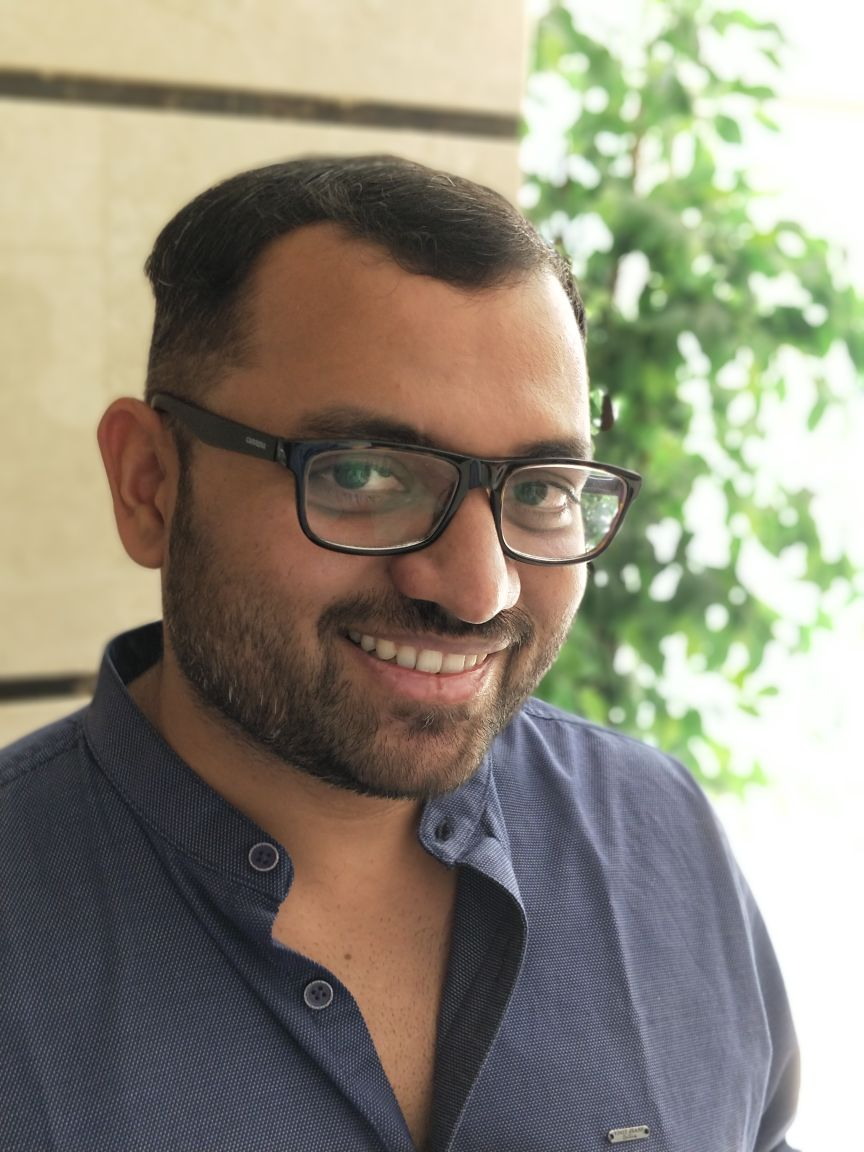
- Occupations: Brand Consultant, Film director, producer
- Years active: 2013–present

Parthan Mohan (born 27 July 1986) is a Malayalam film director and producer. He made his directorial debut with the film ONE in 2013, starring Jagadish. He went on to serve as executive producer for John Paul Vaathil Thurakkunnu (2014) and to co-produce Olappeeppi (2016) and Crossroad (2017).

== Early life ==
Parthan was born into a family of teachers on July 27, 1986, in Trivandrum, Kerala, India. He finished his schooling at Kendriya Vidyalaya, Pattom in 2004. He went on to study at Mar Ivanios College, from where he graduated in Visual and Mass Communication. He earned his bachelor's degree in Video Production & Mass Communication at the University of Kerala with top honours in 2007.

He wrote and directed his first short film, Memoirs, during his campus days at Mar Ivanios. The film was shown at a number of campus short film festivals around South India.

Parthan continued his film studies at the L V Prasad Film & TV Academy in Chennai, where he completed a postgraduate diploma course in Film Direction. In the course of his studies, he completed around ten films, including short fiction projects, documentaries and a music video.

His diploma film at the Academy, Apratheekshitham, won critical acclaim and was selected for international film festivals, including the Mumbai International Film Festival 2010, the ‘I’ve Seen Films’ International Film Festival in Milan, Italy and the ASIEXPO International Film Festival in Lyon, France.

== Career ==
In 2010, Parthan took over his family business of advertising. He now leads Sravia, an established advertising brand in Kerala. He has produced and directed over 450 advertising and corporate films for brands including Malayala Manorama, Agappe Diagnostics, Pankajakasthuri, Bhima Jewellery, Muralya Dairy and Guidehouse India.

In 2013, Parthan made his directorial feature film debut with the Malayalam horror film ONE, starring Jagadish.

He was executive producer for the film John Paul Vaathil Thurakkunnu, released in July 2014.

In 2016, he was co-producer of Olappeeppi, starring Biju Menon. The film won two awards at the Kerala State Film Awards 2017.

In 2017, he completed Mudra, a 15-minute short for the Malayalam Anthology Film Crossroad. It features Isha Talwar and Anjali Nair in leading roles and portrays the story of two classical dancers and their struggles.

He is working on a coming-of-age drama, scheduled for production in mid-2025.

== Filmography ==
Year	Film	Director	Producer	Notes
2013	One	Yes		
2014	John Paul Vaathil Thurakkunnu		Yes	Executive producer
2016	Olappeeppi		Yes	Co-producer
2017	Crossroad		Yes	Producer
