= Sreejith Vijay =

Indian actor

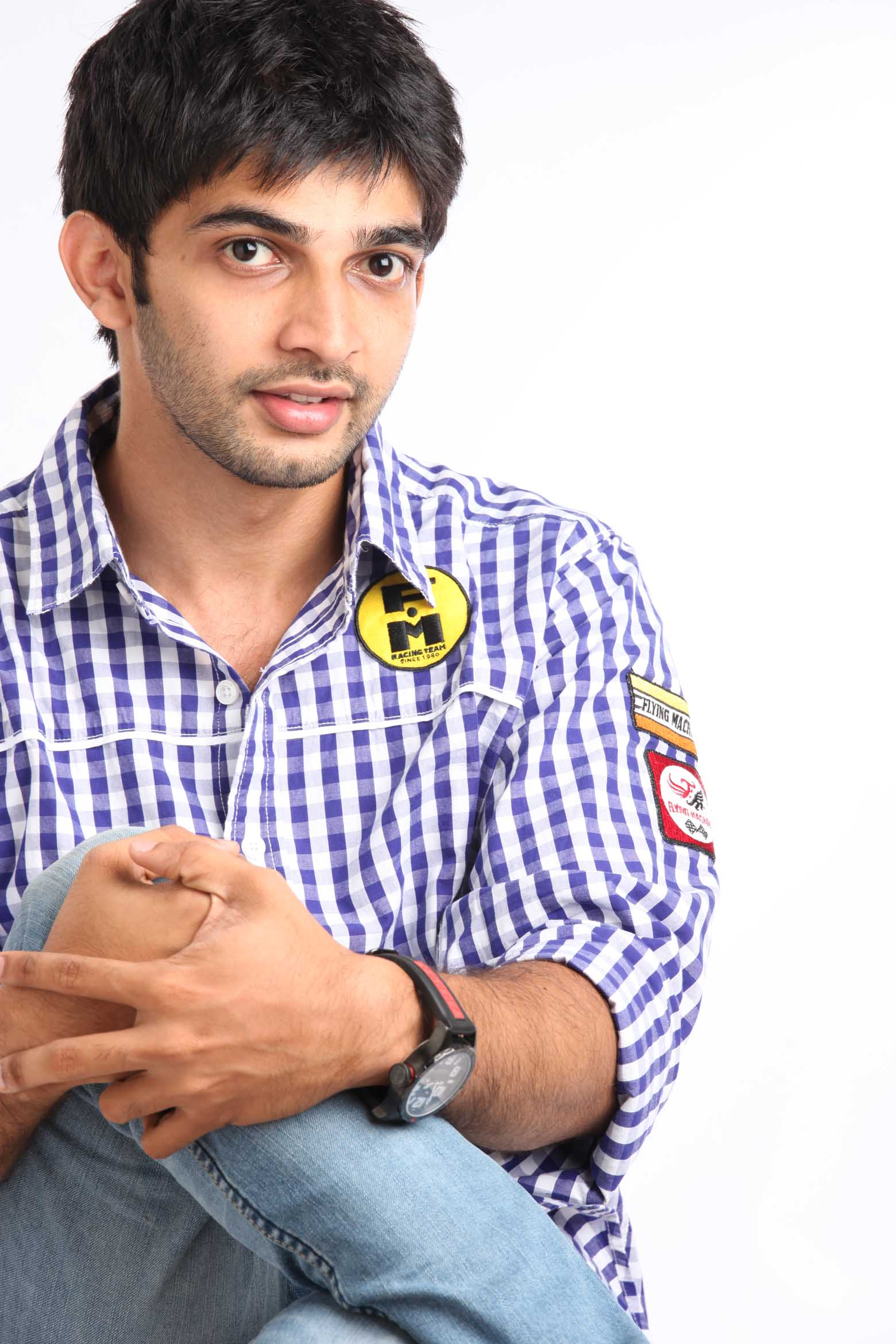
- Born: 28 March 1986 (age 40); Thripunithura, Kerala, India
- Occupations: Actor, Model, RJ, VJ
- Years active: 2011–present
- Spouse: Archana Gopinathan (m. 2018)

Sreejith Vijay is an Indian actor who works predominantly in Malayalam films and television soap operas.

== Personal life ==
Sreejith was born on 28 March 1986 in Thripunithura to Vijayan and Rema. He completed B.Tech. in Computer Science & Engineering and got into modeling. After completing assignments with high-profile clients like Bhima Jewels, Reliance Communications etc., he got his first break into movies when veteran director Fazil offered him a role in the movie Living Together. He has a younger brother, Saurav. He was working as a Radio Jockey in a Radio Station in UAE during the period October 2014 to February 2016. He married Archana on May 12, 2018.

== Film career ==
He made his debut in 2011 through the Malayalam film Living Together. He shot to fame doing the lead role in Rathinirvedam, a remake of old Malayalam superhit Rathinirvedam. He went on to act over 10 films and later shifted his focus to television.

== Filmography ==
Year	Film	Role	Notes
2010	Malarvadi Arts Club	Bhasi's Assistant	Debut film
2011	Living Together	Niranjan	
2011	Rathinirvedam	Pappu	First lead role
2012	Ennennum Ormakkai	Sidharthan	
2013	Maad Dad	Bonnie	
2013	Yathrakkoduvil	Sharath	
2013	Radio		
2013	72 Model	Vivek	
2013	Money Back Policy	Kiran	
2013	Tourist Home	Karthik	
2013	Bunty Chor	Arun	
2013	Good Bad & Ugly	Jeevan	
2013	Good Idea		
2014	One Day Jokes		
2015	Friendship	Rahul	
2015	St Mary'sile Kolapathakam	Sanjay	
2016	Chennai Koottam	Alex	
2019	Oru Nalla Kottayamkkaran		
2025	Cherukkanum Pennum	Balu	

== Television ==
=== Soap operas ===
Year	Title	Role	Channel	Notes
2017–2018	Avaril Oraal	Madhav Mohan	Surya TV	
2018–2019	Swathi Nakshatram Chothi	Neel Mahesh	Zee Keralam	Replaced by Anand Narayan
2020	Kudumbavilakku	Dr.Anirudh Sidharth	Asianet	Replaced by Anand Narayan
2021	Ente Bharya	Rahul	Flowers TV	
2021-2022	Amma Makal	Dr.Vipin Vallabhan	Zee Keralam	
2021	Palunku	Nikhil Anirudhan	Asianet	Cameo
2023-2024	Ammakkilikkoodu	Nandan	Surya TV	
2024	Kudumbavilakku 2	Dr.Anirudh Sidharth	Asianet	
2025–present	Krishna Gadha	Naveen Varma	Zee Keralam	

=== Reality shows ===
Year	Title	Role	Channel	Notes
2014	D 4 Dance	Host	Mazhavil Manorama	Replaced by Govind Padmasoorya
2021	Lets Rock And Roll	Participant	Zee Keralam	
2023	Dancing Stars	Himself	Asianet	
2023	Onnonnara Ruchi	Himself	Zee Keralam	
