= Arun Shankar =

- Born: New Delhi, India
- Occupations: Actor, singer, director, and writer
- Years active: 2013 – Present
- Parent(s): Prabha Shankar Mohan (mother), Shankar Mohan (father)
- Awards: National Film Award – Special Mention

Arun Shankar is an Indian actor, singer, director, and writer. He started his acting career with television commercials and then acted in the lead role for two films: Camel Safari (2013) and The Chameleon (2015). He received the 2016 National Film Award – Special Mention at the 63rd National Film Awards for his psychological short fiction film The Chameleon (2015).

== Early life and career ==
Born and grew up in Delhi, Arun Shankar is a son of Shankar Mohan, a Malayalam actor.

Arun started his career as an actor in Hindi theatre under the guidance of M. Sayeed Alam, and subsequently worked as a model in television advertisements. His first notable role was in commercial for Malabar Gold which was directed by V. K. Prakash. He received attention as an actor with the 2013 Malayalam-language film Camel Safari, directed by Jayaraj. In 2015, Arun made his first short fiction film, which was based on the mental condition of bipolar disorder. For the film, he won the National Film Award in 2016.

Arun featured as a Rapper along with Neeti Mohan in the song Hum (2021). The song starred television actor Pooja Banerjee and Ruthvik Reddy In 2021, Arun signed debutant Ruthvik Reddy and Neeti Mohan for his next untitled Hindi film.

== Filmography ==
| Year | Film | Role |
|---|---|---|
| 2013 | Camel Safari | Lead Actor |
| 2016 | The Chameleon | Lead Actor |
| | Untitled | Director |

== Music ==
| Year | Song title | Music label | Ref. |
| 2018 | Hidayat | Zee Music Company | |
| 2020 | Hum | ASP Music | |

== Awards ==
Arun won the 2016 National Film Award – Special Mention at the 63rd National Film Awards for his psychological short fiction film The Chameleon (2016). He received the award for presenting the "twists and turns of a distorted mind" of the film's protagonist.
