= Camel Safari =

- Poster
- Directed by: Jayaraj
- Screenplay by: Thomas Thoppilkkudi
- Story by: Jayaraj
- Produced by: Rejimon Kappaparambil
- Starring: Arun Shankar; Pankaja Menon; Sekhar Menon; Adarsh; Kamal Gaur
- Cinematography: Suresh Rajan
- Edited by: Mejo
- Music by: Deepankuran
- Release date: 26 September 2013
- Country: India
- Language: Malayalam

Camel Safari is a 2013 Indian Malayalam-language romance film directed by Jayaraj which narrates a love story set in Rajasthan. The movie features Arun Shankar and Pankaja Menon in the lead roles. Sekhar Menon, Tini Tom, Sabitha Jayaraj, Binu Adimaly, Neha Ramesh, Hashim Hussain, Vishnu Mohan and Anjali Ajayan play supporting roles; Kamal Gaur, the villain of Johnnie Walker, made a comeback. The filming of Camel Safari begun on 22 November 2012 at the Pushkar Fair in Rajasthan. It was completed in three schedules with the maximum being shot in Rajasthan (Jodhpur, Jaisalmer, Bikaner and Camel safari in Pushkar) and the rest in Cochin, Kerala. The song rights of the film were sold to Manorama Music. The film Camel Safari was released on 26 September 2013.

== Plot ==
Dia is a management student in Mangalore. She and four of her friends (Catherine, Hashim, Yamini and Chinna Gounder) visit Rajasthan for 15 days to attend a wedding. There she meets a Rajput boy Pavan and falls in love with him. What happens to her thereafter in that unknown land forms the rest of the film.

== Cast ==
- Arun Shankar as Pavan
- Pankaja Menon as Diya
- Kamal Gaur as Vikram Singh
- Sekhar Menon as James Kallarakkal
- Tini Tom as College professor
- Sabitha Jayaraj as Suparna Deedi
- Binu Adimali as Dhushyandhan
- Neha Ramesh as Yamini
- Anjali Ajayan as Catherine
- Hashim Hussain as Hashim
- Vishnu Mohan as Chinna Gounter

== Reception ==
Camel Safari was released on 26 September 2013.

== Soundtrack ==
Music: Deepankuran, Lyrics: Kaithapram Damodaran Namboothiri. The song "Kannum kannum" was copied from "Mere Mehboob", sung by Mohammed Rafi.

- "Aaraaro" - Aswathy Vijayan
- "Suruma" - Shakthisree Gopalan
- "Afreen" - Deepankuran
- "Halwa" - Anna Katharina Valayil
- "Kannum Kannum" - Cicily, Sinov Raj
- "Sayyan" - Aswathy Vijayan
