= Revathy S. Varmha =

Indian film director

Revathy S Varmha
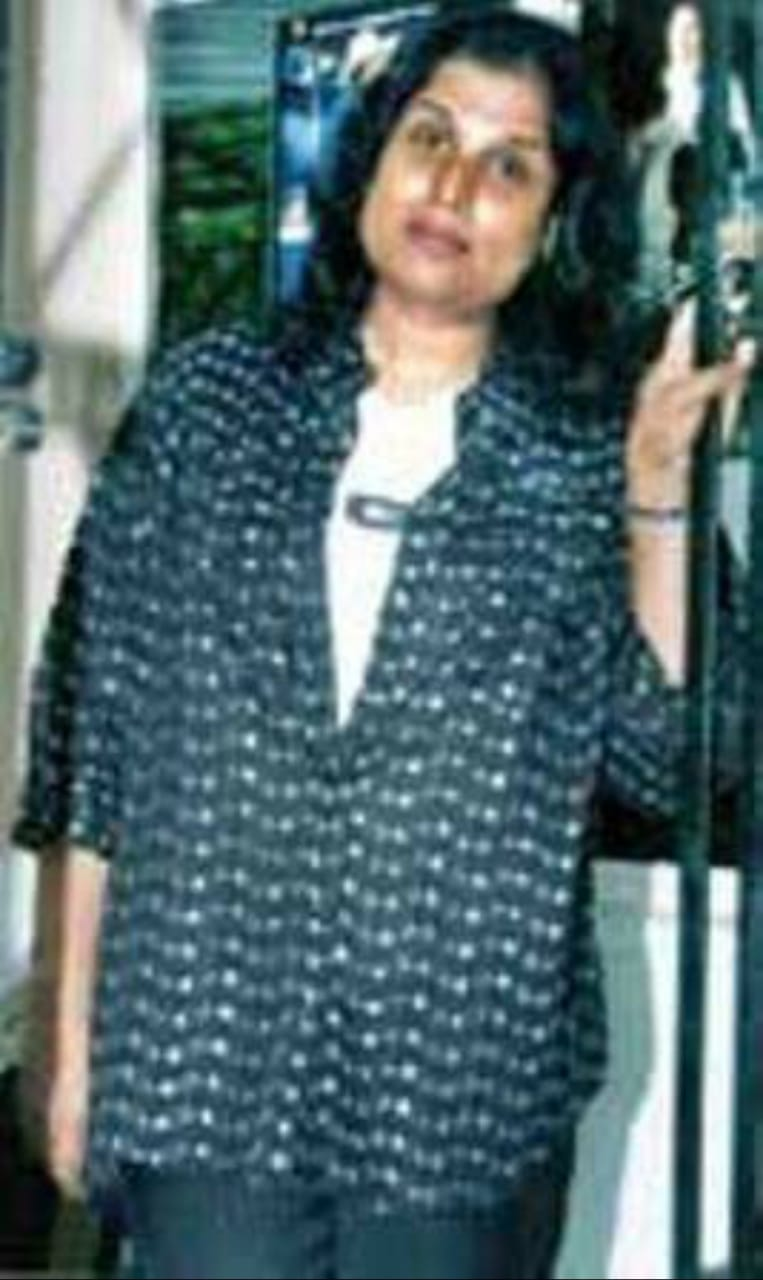
- Born: New Delhi, India
- Occupations: Film director; screenwriter
- Years active: 2006–present

Revathy S Varmha is an Indian director.

== Career ==
=== Advertisements ===
Varmha began to write scripts for commercials at age 16. Living in New Delhi, she began directing commercials in the 1990s when she took over for the director of a Rexona spot and by 2005 had directed more than 480 commercials, including spots for Cadbury, Parker Pens, Nakshatra Jewellery and the Hyundai Santro. Around 60 novelettes in English, Hindi and Tamil is to her credit.

=== Film career ===
In 2005 Varmha began directing movies. Her debut was the Tamil family film June R, which release in 2006. The film stars Jyothika in the title role which was her 25th Tamil film along with the supporting cast Khushbu Sundar, Saritha and Biju Menon.The film was initially scheduled for release in June 2005 but was later pushed back to release in the Diwali season of 2005 so the film could be promoted more heavily. The film was also caught up when Kushboo's films were temporarily banned after her comments on pre-marital sex angered Indian political parties.

After the release of June R, she began to direct two more films, the Bollywood remake of June R entitled Aap Ke Liye Hum, and the Sri Lankan film Yasoda Kanna, which was criticized for its political stance.The film Aap Ke Liye Hum had the Bollywood star cast Jaya Bachchan, Mithun Chakraborty, Manisha Koirala, Raveena Tandon, Ayesha Takia Azmi and Ranvir Shorey in the lead roles.

In 2012, she directed Maad Dad, her first Malayalam film, with a second Malayalam film in pre-production in December 2012. It also had ensemble cast including Lal, Nazriya Nazim, Meghana Raj, Lalu Alex, Padmapriya and Pooja Gandhi.

In 2014, she started pre-production works for the biopic The Golden Girl, P T Usha.

== Filmography ==
Year	Title	Language	Notes	Ref.
2006	Nimisham	Malayalam	Short	
2006	June R	Tamil		
2012	Maad Dad	Malayalam		
2025	E Valayam	Malayalam		
TBA	Aap Ke Liye Hum	Hindi		
