= Yathrakkoduvil =

- Directed by: Basil Zak
- Starring: Sreejith Vijay; Thilakan; Aishwarya Devan; Vidya
- Cinematography: Sinu Sidharth
- Music by: Satheesh Ramachandran
- Production company: V R Visual Ray Productions
- Release date: 11 January 2013
- Country: India
- Language: Malayalam

Yathrakkoduvil (English:At the end of the journey) is a Malayalam movie starring Sreejith Vijay and Thilakan among others. It is directed by Basil Zac. The movie was released on 11 January 2013.

== Plot ==
Yathrakkoduvil movie, is telling the story of seven friends who get together after their college life. They joined again by leaving all the relation they have before and after the college life is to attend the marriage function of one of them. The incidents happened during the joyful journey arranged by the groom to his home is the core of this story.

== Cast ==
- Sreejith Vijay as Sharath
- Vidya as Sana
- Thilakan as Ravi
- Devan as David
- Ramu as Vishwambaran
- Sani Naryan
- Vidya
- Navami
- Navaneeth
- Prathish
