= Penangunni =

- Paazhunni film poster
- Directed by: Manoj Chandrasekharan
- Screenplay by: Abhinu Yadhu Sudhanya
- Story by: Kureepuzha Sreekumar
- Based on: Penangunni by Kureepuzha Sreekumar
- Produced by: Venkit Mahadevan
- Starring: Abhijith Sanal; Vaishnavi
- Cinematography: Rathan P Chandavath, Rakesh C S.
- Edited by: Vipin
- Music by: Aneesh J. S.; Raj Kumarapuram
- Production company: Egograph
- Release date: 2 August 2013
- Country: India
- Language: Malayalam

Penangunni is a 2013 Malayalam 3D film directed by Manoj Chandrasekharan, starring child actors Abhijith Sanal and Vaishnavi in the lead roles. Based on the poem Penangunni by Kureepuzha Sreekumar, which itself won the Balasahithya Award from the Kerala Sahithya Academy in 2003, The film was released 2 August 2013.

== Plot ==
The film presents a cinematic journey through the literary lands of Kerala (Malayalam) in order to examine and understand its heritage.

Two orphans are in search of their lost parrot. The parrot represents the lost mother tongue, Malayalam. It is through exploration of the various landmarks and milestones of the language, that the children make their journey to find their pet.

== Cast ==
- Abhijith Sanal as Penangunni
- Vaishnavi as Amminikkutty

== Release ==
The film's audio tracks were released 11 April 2012 at KV Pattom.
