= Pattam Pole =

- Theatrical release poster
- Directed by: Alagappan N
- Written by: K Girish Kumar
- Produced by: Karunakaran Kanhangad
- Starring: Dulquer Salman; Malavika Mohanan
- Cinematography: Selvakumar S
- Edited by: Raja Mohammed
- Music by: M. Jayachandran
- Production company: Carlton Films
- Distributed by: Carlton Films; Kalasangham Films; Kas
- Release date: 11 October 2013
- Country: India
- Language: Malayalam

Pattam Pole (English: Like a Kite) is a 2013 Malayalam romantic film directed by cinematographer Alagappan N, who makes his directorial debut. The film stars Dulquer Salmaan and Malavika Mohanan (in her acting debut) with Archana Kavi, Anoop Menon, Lalu Alex, Jayaprakash, Seetha, Leema Babu, Shraddha Gokul, Nandu and Ilavarasu play supporting roles.

== Plot ==
Karthi- a Hindu Brahmin boy and Riya- a Christian girl elope one early morning to Ooty, fearing that the elders in the family will not accept their inter-religious relationship. They return to their respective homes a couple of days after fighting. They convince their family members that they hate each other and vow never to see each other again. But their fathers plan to reunite them thinking that they have broken due to immatureness and ego problems. Riya's father is a friend of Karthi's father. Riya's family [without Riya] visit Karthi's home and invite them to Riya's marriage.

Meanwhile, both Riya and Karthi join the same company to work. Due to losses in the company caused by Riya, she is expelled from her job. Soon after Karthi meet Riya and they express love for each other and decide to elope in a houseboat. However, they are caught by their fathers. Karthi's father hands them a marriage invitation which reads "Riya and Karthik". The movie ends as they both thank and hug their fathers. The film ends as they walk through their home happily.

== Cast ==
- Dulquer Salmaan as Karthikeyan
- Malavika Mohanan as Riya
- Archana Kavi as Sherin Varghese
- Anoop Menon as Michael Rossario
- Jayaprakash as Narayana Swami, Karthik's father
- Lalu Alex as Mathews, Riya's father
- Meera Krishnan as Anandam, Karthik's mother
- Seetha as Sussan Mathews, Riya's mother
- Leema Babu as Varalakshmi, Karthik's cousin
- Sunil Sukhada as Avira
- Shraddha Gokul as Rita, Riya's sister
- Kannan Nayar as Ronex, Sherin's fiancée
- Nandu as Father Stephen
- Ilavarasu as Sethuraman, Karthik's uncle
- Ziyam Hasbi as Rinu
- Anjali Aneesh Upasana
- Manjusha Sajish as a bride travelling in bus

== Production ==
The film marks the directorial debut of veteran cinematographer Alagappan. The story has been nurtured by Alagappan for two and a half years. His story and idea found many takers and veteran producer Carlton Karunakaran readily agreed to produce the film. But Alagappan wanted to finish all his projects for other filmmakers before he donned the director's cap. In the meantime, he tightened his script and penned the dialogues in Tamil while Gireesh Kumar who wrote the scripts took care of the parts in Malayalam.

The film commenced its production in June 2013 in Kumbakonam in Tamil Nadu. The major location was Alappuzha in Kerala where the film is mostly set.

== Soundtrack ==
Pattam Pole

Soundtrack album by M. Jayachandran
- Released: 2013
- Genre: Film
- Language: Malayalam

M. Jayachandran chronology
Kalimannu (2013)	Pattam Pole (2013)	Radio Jockey (2013)

The film features songs composed by M. Jayachandran and written by Santhosh Verma and Annamalai (Antha Naalil song).Label registered as Satyam Audios

Track	Song title	Singer(s)
1	"Hey Vennilaa"	Haricharan, Mridula Warrier
2	"Antha Naalil"	Madhu Balakrishnan, Harini
3	"Kannil Kannilonnu"	Vijay Prakash, Shakthisree Gopalan
4	"Mazhaye Thoomazhaye"	Haricharan, Mridula Warrier

== Critical reception ==
The film received negative reviews from critics. Paresh C Palicha of Rediff.com rated the film 2/5 and said, "Alagappan has tried to serve old wine in a 'new generation' bottle in his first film as director, and the result is just average." The critic however felt that the film "is unconventionally bold with the way it deals with the issue of live-in relationship." Ramesh Chandran of Malayala Manorama rated the film 1 in a scale of 5 and stated that the director has failed to impress the audience in his directorial debut. The critic concluded his review saying, "The movie has no spark. It does not offer you anything new or something old in a better way." Aswin J. Kumar of The Times of India wrote: "Romance, no matter how many times it's told, has a special lure that diminishes the cliches that accompany it. In this film, this never happens." Veeyen of Nowrunning.com rated the film 2/5 and said, "Azhagappan's directorial debut 'Pattam Pole' is a kite that takes to the winds with a vengeance, having severed its ties off its flyer. It flies aimlessly this way and that before losing poise and crashing to the ground, all torn and tattered.".
