= 72 Model =

2013 Malayalam film

- DVD Cover
- Directed by: Rajasenan
- Produced by: J. Saratchandran Nair
- Starring: Govind Padmasoorya; Sreejith Vijay
- Cinematography: K. P. Nambiathiri
- Music by: M. Jayachandran
- Production company: Chand Creations
- Release date: 26 April 2013
- Country: India
- Language: Malayalam

72 Model is a 2013 Indian Malayalam-language drama film directed by Rajasenan and starring Govind Padmasoorya and Sreejith Vijay. The film released alongside Akam and August Club. The film's name is based on a 1972 model of an ambassador. The film released to mixed reviews.

== Cast ==
- Govind Padmasoorya as Saajan
- Sreejith Vijay as Vivek
- Sonia Das as Parvathy
- Nazreen Nazar as Janaki
- Madhu
- Vijayaraghavan as Vasutty
- Bharath Chand
- Kalabhavan Shajon
- Vanitha Krishnachandran as Saajan's mother

== Soundtrack ==
Music for the film was composed by M. Jayachandran, with lyrics penned by Rajeev Alunkal and Santhosh Varma. The promotional song "Car Taxi" was sung by Benny Dayal.

== Reception ==
A critic from The Times of India wrote that "Rajasenan dishes out a few moments but they lack the bold, emphatic strokes with which he once wooed viewers". A critic from Nowrunning gave the film a rating of one out of five stars while Indiaglitz gave the film a rating of negative four out of ten. A critic from Filmibeat wrote that "Overall, 72 Model is a good comedy entertainer, which would impress family audience as well as youth". The film was a box office failure.
