= Maad Dad =

- Directed by: Revathy S Varmha
- Written by: Revathy S Varmha
- Produced by: P. N. Venugopal
- Starring: Lal; Nazriya Nazim; Meghana Raj; Lalu Alex
- Cinematography: Pradeep Nair
- Edited by: Johnkutty
- Music by: Alex Paul
- Production company: P N V Associates
- Distributed by: MKG Films
- Release date: 11 January 2013
- Country: India
- Language: Malayalam

Maad Dad is a 2013 Malayalam-language film, directed by Revathy S Varmha, starring Lal, Nazriya Nazim, Meghana Raj, and Lalu Alex. It marked Nazriya's debut film as a leading actress.

== Cast ==
- Lal as Palachottil Geevargees Kuriyakose Eesho
  - Balu Varghese as Young Eesho
- Nazriya Nazim as Mariya
- Meghana Raj as Anuradha/Annamma, Eesho's wife and Mariya's mother
- Sreejith Vijay as Bonnie
- Lalu Alex as Soda Mathan, Bony's father
- Padmapriya as Dr. Rasiya
- Pooja Gandhi as Lisa
- Vijayaraghavan as Krishnan
- Balu R Nair as Ansari
- Janardanan as Mamachan
- Aishwarya as Sosamma, Bonnie's mother and Mathan's wife
- Kovai Sarala as Dawini D’Zosa
- Salim Kumar as Giridhar
- Shari as Sarala
- Lakshmi Priya as Omana

== Production ==
Mohanlal was to play the title role first, but he was replaced by Lal. Also Shweta Menon was first signed for a role but had to opt out due to pregnancy. She was replaced by Padmapriya. Archana Kavi, who was to play an important role, has been replaced by Nazriya Nazim.

== Critical reception ==
Malayala Manorama called it a good movie. Other critics were negative about the film's qualities.
