= Rathinirvedam (1978 film) =

- DVD cover
- Directed by: Bharathan
- Written by: P. Padmarajan
- Based on: Rathinirvedam by P. Padmarajan
- Produced by: Hari Pothan
- Starring: Jayabharathi; Krishnachandran; Kaviyoor Ponnamma
- Cinematography: Ramachandra Babu
- Edited by: K. Narayanan
- Music by: Devarajan
- Production company: Supriya Creations
- Release date: 8 March 1978
- Running time: 124 minutes
- Country: India
- Language: Malayalam

Rathinirvedam (transl. Adolescent desire) is a 1978 Indian Malayalam-language erotic drama film directed by Bharathan and written by P. Padmarajan based on his own novel of the same name. In the film, Pappu, a teenager, is awaiting his pre-degree results to join an engineering course. He gets attracted to his neighbour Rathi, who is a middle-aged woman, and falls hopelessly in love.

The story-line of the film miffed many for its sensitive portrayal of the lead as well as garnered appreciation for its narrative. It is said to have redefined the art of filmmaking in the country, and hence regarded as a landmark in Indian film history. The film was also one of the biggest box office hits in Kerala state's history. It inspires similar productions all over the nation, even decades after its release.

== Cast ==
- Jayabharathi as Rathi
- Krishnachandran as Pappu
- Kaviyoor Ponnamma as Saraswathi
- K.P.A.C. Lalitha as Bharathi
- Meena as Narayaniyamma
- Soman as Krishnan Nair
- Adoor Bhasi
- Master Manohar
- Baby Sumathi as Shanthi
- Bahadoor as Kochammani
- T. R. Omana

== Production ==
The film was produced by Hari Pothan under the banner of Supriya Films. It was mostly shot in Nelliampathi, Palakkad, Kerala. Director Bharathan had proposed to actress K.P.A.C. Lalitha after the shooting of this film. They remained together till the death of the former.

== Soundtrack ==
The music was composed by G. Devarajan and the lyrics were written by Kavalam Narayana Panicker.

| No. | Song | Singers | Lyrics | Length (m:ss) |
|---|---|---|---|---|
| 1 | "Kaalam Kunjumanassil" | P. Jayachandran, Chorus, Karthikeyan | Kavalam Narayana Panicker | |
| 2 | "Mounam Thalarum" | K. J. Yesudas | Kavalam Narayana Panicker | |
| 3 | "Shyaamanandana Vaniyilninnum" | P. Madhuri | Kavalam Narayana Panicker | |
| 4 | "Thiruthirumaaran" | K. J. Yesudas | Kavalam Narayana Panicker | |

== Legacy ==
Rathinirvedam is regarded as a landmark in Indian film history. It inspires similar productions all over South India, even decades after its release.

== Remake ==
A remake of the film was made in 2011. It was directed by T. K. Rajeev Kumar. Shwetha Menon played the female lead, and Sreejith played the young male lead. Padmarajan himself was credited as the writer.

== Awards ==
- Filmfare Award for Best Film - Malayalam won by Hari Pothan (1978)
