= Sudeep Kumar =

Indian playback singer (born 1975)

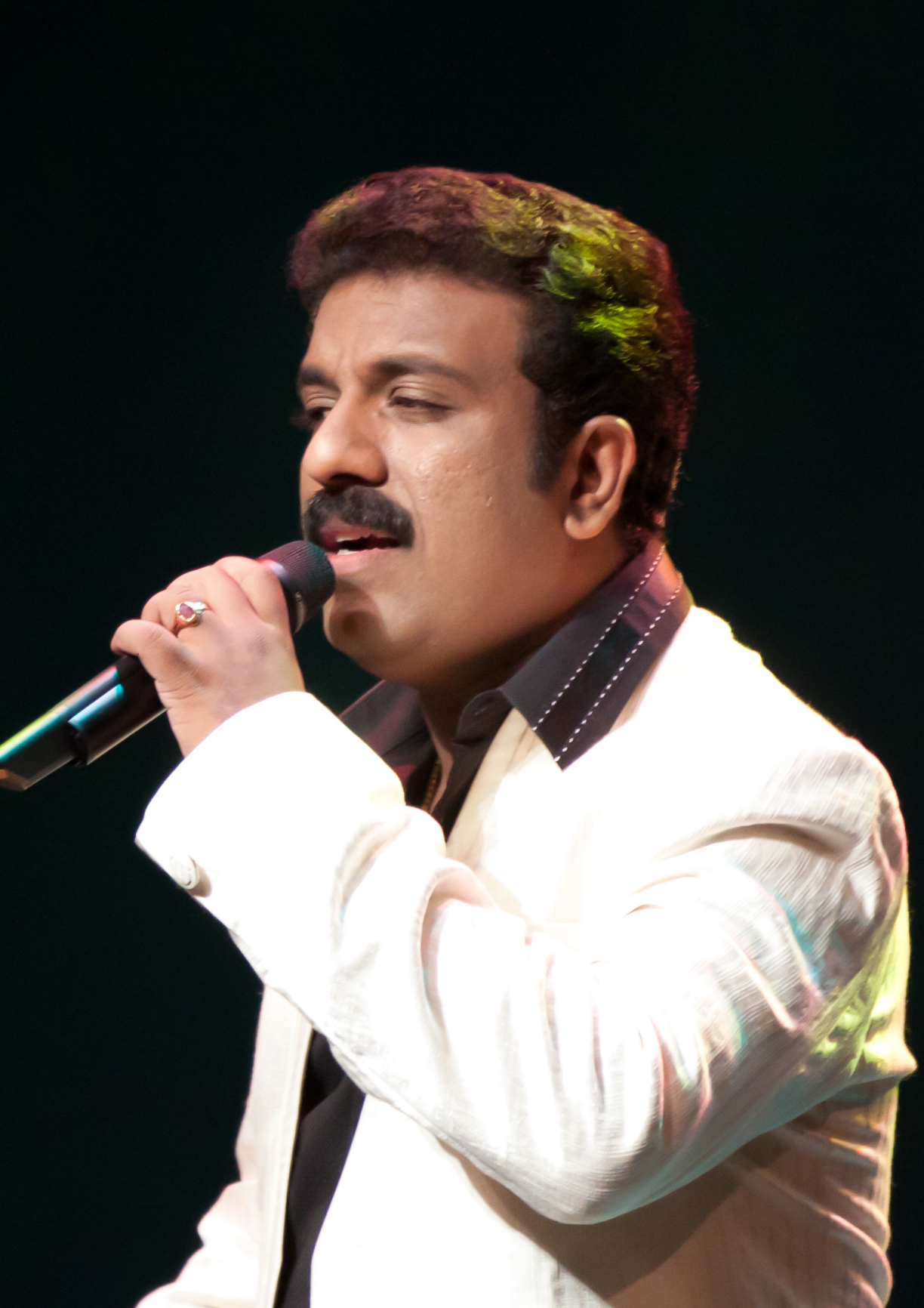
- Sudeep Kumar, in 2011.

Background information
- Born: 25 May 1975 (age 51); Alappuzha, Kerala, India
- Origin: Kerala, India
- Genres: Indian classical music, playback singing
- Occupation: Playback Singer
- Years active: 1992–present

Sudeep Kumar is an Indian playback singer. He sings Indian classical, devotional, and popular music. He has recorded more than 5,000 songs in languages including Malayalam, Tamil, Kannada and Sanskrit, during a career spanning two decades. He is the president of Malayalam playback singers' association SAMAM (Singers' Association- Malayalam Movies)

== Personal life ==
Sudeep is born to Kainakary Surendran and Rajamma. Sudeep had his education at St Joseph's High School, Punnapra, SD College, Alappuzha, from where he did his graduation in Malayalam, and LLB from Government Law college, Thiruvananthapuram. He is married to classical dancer Kalamandalam Sophia. They have two daughters, Minsara and Neehara.

== Playback singing career ==
=== Debut and early career ===
The early stages of his career were marked by singing for dramas and albums. He worked with notable musicians including his mentor Kalavoor Balan, N.P. Prabhakaran, Alleppey Vivekanandan, Alleppey Rishikesh, Kumarakam Rajappan, Vypin Surendran, K.M.Udayan, T.S.Radhakrishnan, Sebi Nayarambalam, Samji Aarattupuzha, M.G.Anil, Raveendran Thiruvalla, Vidhyadharan master, R.Somasekharan, Jerry Amaldev, Johnson, Raveendran, M.G.Radhakrishnan, Perumbavoor G.Raveendranath, V.Dakshinamoorthy, M.K.Arjunan, and G.Devarajan.

His first film audio Thalolam released in 1998 (lyrics and music by Kaithapram) was produced by Johny Sagariga, who introduced him to the audio industry. It was in 1999 that Sudeep Kumar met Devarajan master which proved to be a turning point in his career. In the year 2000, when Devarajan master conducted a stage show titled Five promising singers of the new millennium, Sudeep Kumar was one among the five.

== Music career ==
Sudeep Kumar was introduced as a playback singer by the director Vinayan in his movie Oomapenninu Uriyaadappayyan. The soundtrack of the film was composed by Mohan Sitara and lyrics were penned by Yusuf Ali Kecheri. Subsequently, he got songs in Vinayan's movies such as Kattu Chembakam, Vellinakshatram and Albhuthadweepu (Malayalam & Tamil). Over the years he associated with music directors such as Ousepachan, Mohan Sitara, M.M.Keeravani, Kaithapram, Rajamani, Sarath, Ramesh Narayanan, Berny Ignatious, M.G. Sreekumar, Kaithapram Viswanathan, Bijibal, Rony Raphael, Shan Rahman, Gopi Sundar& Jakes Bijoy

Composer M.Jayachandran gave major opportunities for Sudeep Kumar which placed him as a playback singer in the Malayalam film industry. They have worked together in more than 25 films in Malayalam and the result has been hit songs such as Odiyan (Kondoram), Madambi (Ente sharike), Shikar (Enthedi), Rathinirvedam(Chempakapoo), Chattakari (Nilave), and Swapna sanchari (Vellaramkunnileri).

=== Television ===
On television he has compered music-related programmes on Asianet, namely Pa Dha Ni Sa, Gaanasamasya, Music Live, and Limelight. He has appeared in Sangeethasaagaram and as a guest performer in Idea Star Singer.

He has worked as a mentor on the music reality show Gandharvasangeetham on Kairali TV . He has also worked as a groomer in Idea Star Singer Season 3 and 6 and Amritha Junior Superstar.

He is one of the judges in popular reality show Top singer in Flowers TV

== Awards ==
- Kerala State Award
  - 2012 - Won - Best Male Playback Singer - "Chempakapoo." - Rathinirvedam
- Other awards
  - 2009 - Vayalar Chalachithra Award for Best Male Playback Singer - "Madhuram Gayathi Meera" - Benaras
  - 2011 - KAVIA Singer of the year Award for Best Male Playback Singer - "Enthedi" -(Shikkar )
  - 2009 - P.Bhaskaran Foundation Film Award for Best Male Playback Singer - "Chempakapoo" - (Rathinirvedam )
  - 2009 - Jesy Foundation Film Award for Best Male Playback Singer - "Chempakapoo" - Rathinirvedam
  - 2009 - Radio Mirchi South Indian Film Music Award for Best Male Playback Singer - "Chempakapoo" - (Rathinirvedam )
  - 2008 - Jeevan TV Award for the Best Album Singer - "Ekakikalude Geetham" - Ekakikalude Geetham
  - 2014 - Kerala Film Critics Association Award - Best Male Singer - "Vaarmathiye" - ( Once Upon a time, There Was a Kallan )
  - 2018 Vanitha Film Award - Male singer - Best duet song - " Kondoram"-Odiyan
  - 2022 Gurupriya TV Film award - Best male playback singer (Changayi, Swapnangangalkkappuram)
