= Jyotsna Radhakrishnan =

Indian playback singer

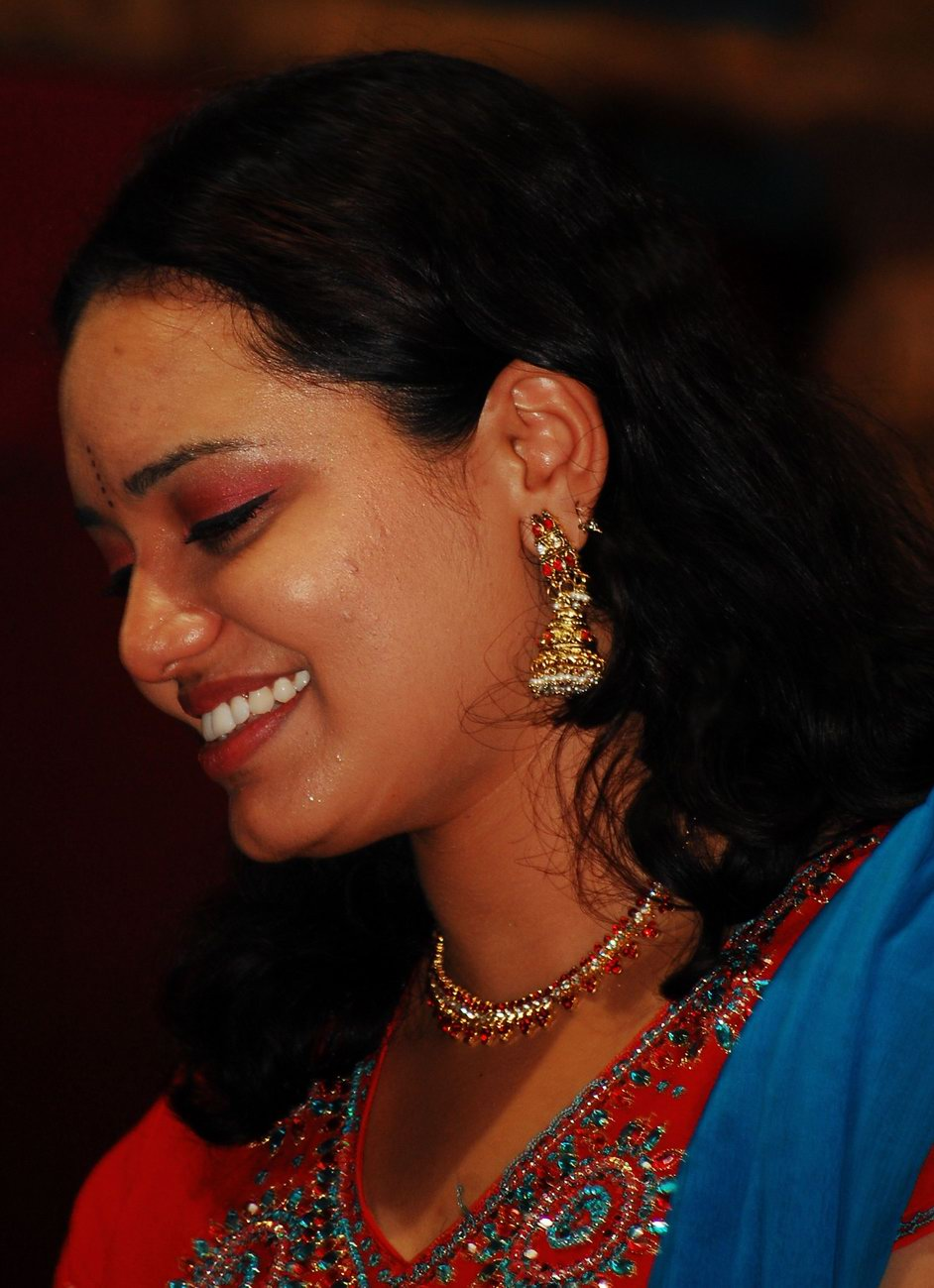

Background information
- Born: 5 September 1986 (age 39); Kuwait City, Kuwait
- Origin: Thrissur, Kerala
- Genres: Playback singing
- Occupation: Singer
- Instrument: Vocalist
- Years active: 1998–present

Jyotsna Radhakrishnan (born 5 September 1986) is an Indian playback singer. She predominantly works in 12 languages including Malayalam, Tamil, Telugu and Kannada. She has sung more than 1000 songs. She is based in Thrissur, Kerala. Jyotsna gained wider recognition for singing popular songs such as “Karuppinazhaku” from Swapnakoodu (2003), “Themma Themma Themmadikkatte” from Rain Rain Come Again (2004) and "Raftara" from Lucifer (2019).

== Early life ==
Jyotsna was born in Kuwait. At a very young age she moved to Abu Dhabi, United Arab Emirates.

She did her schooling at the Asian International School in Ruwais, an industrial area 240 kilometres (150 miles) west of Abu Dhabi, where she excelled at singing.

== Singing career ==
Jyotsna's interest in music started at a very young age. She learned the Carnatic vocal style under Mangad Natesan, and the Hindustani classical vocal style under Guru Dinesh Devdas.

Although she started her career in Malayalam cinema with the song "Valakilukkam Kettedee" from the film Pranayamani Thooval in 2002. It was "Sughamanee Nilavu" from Nammal that brought her to wider attention. She has sung in almost 800 movies, in Malayalam as well as in Tamil and Telugu. She has sung on some 200 albums. Some of her hits are "Karuppinazhagu" from Swapnakoodu, "Melleyonnu" from Manassinakkare, and "Meheruba" from Perumazhakkalamand also Raftara in "Lucifer" in Malayalam

Some of her latest films are Classmates, Pothen Vava, Don, Notebook and Janmam. She has traveled to the UK, the US, Australia and Singapore for musical programs, and has performed with almost all leading playback singers of south India. She concluded another North American tour with singer G. Venugopal and in August 2013 in Australia with Unni Menon performing for Malayalees in major cities. This was her first trip to Australia where she was accompanied by Ramesh Pisharody.

== Personal life ==
On 26 December 2010, Jyotsna married Sreekanth Surendran, a software engineer from Kochi. She gave birth to their first child, a boy, on 9 July 2015.

In 2025, Jyotsna revealed that she has been diagnosed with autism.

== Awards ==
Asianet Film Awards:

- 2002 - Best Female Playback - Nammal

Kerala Film Critics Award:

- 2013 - Best Female playback Singer - Zachariayude Garbhinikal
- 2017 - Best Female Playback Singer - Kaattu
- Winner of Title trophy "Rasna Girl 2001", an open UAE music competition in Hindi film songs
- Prize winner in "Sangeetha Prathibha Sangamam", an open UAE music competition in Malayalam film songs
- Shruthi Bharatham Award for best Female Playback Singer 2003
- "Yuva Prathibha" award by Pallavoor Appu Marar Smaraka Kala KshetRa 2003
- All Kerala Youth Campus Critics Award 2004
- Mahatma Gandhi Education Foundation Award 2004
- "Outstanding Young Person" Award by Jaycees
- Kaveri Film Critics TV Award 2004
- Jaycees Foundation Award for Best Female Playback Singer
- Film Audience Award 2005
- Gulf Malayalam Music Award 2006
- Mazhavil Mango Music awards 2017 -Best Non Film song

== Discography: Malayalam ==
=== 2002 ===
Film	No	Song	Composer(s)	Lyricist(s)	Co-artist(s)
Kunjikoonan	1	"Kunjante Penninu[F]"	Mohan Sithara	Yusufali Kechery	Hridhya Suresh
Pranayamanithooval	2	"Valakilukkammmmm"	Mohan Sithara	Kaithapram Damodaran Namboothiri	Sujatha Mohan, Smitha
Pranayamanithooval	3	"Omana Laila (D)"	Mohan Sithara	Kaithapram Damodaran Namboothiri	MG Sreekumar
Pranayamanithooval	4	"Omana Laila (F)"	Mohan Sithara	Kaithapram Damodaran Namboothiri	Solo
Nammal	5	"Sukhamanee Nilavu [F]"	Mohan Sithara	Kaithapram Damodaran Namboothiri	Solo
Nammal	6	"Sukhamanee Nilavu [D]"	Mohan Sithara	Kaithapram Damodaran Namboothiri	Vidhu Prathap
Yathrakkarude Sradhakku	7	"Onnu Thodanullil[F]"	Johnson	Kaithapram Damodaran Namboothiri	Solo

=== 2003 ===
Film	No	Song	Composer(s)	Lyricist(s)	Co-artist(s)
Manassinakkare	8	"Melleyonnu Paadi Ninne"	Ilayaraja	Gireesh Puthanchery	K J Yesudas
Choonda	9	"Paathira Nilavilum(F)"	Mohan Sithara	Yusufali Kechery	Solo
Choonda	10	"Paathira Nilavilum(D)"	Mohan Sithara	Yusufali Kechery	Sunil Viswachaithanya
Choonda	11	"Parannu Parannu"	Mohan Sithara	Yusufali Kechery	Solo
Swapnakkoodu	12	"Maaya Sandhye"	Mohan Sithara	Kaithapram Damodaran Namboothiri	K J Yesudas
Swapnakkoodu	13	"Karuppinazhku"	Mohan Sithara	Kaithapram Damodaran Namboothiri	Pradeep Kumar, Rajesh Vijay
Pulival Kalyanam	14	"Gujarathi (D)"	Berny-Ignatius	Kaithapram Damodaran Namboothiri	Vidhu Prathap
Pulival Kalyanam	15	"Gujarathi(F)"	Berny-Ignatius	Kaithapram Damodaran Namboothiri	Solo
Kasthooriman	16	"One Plus One"	Ouseppachan	Kaithapram Damodaran Namboothiri	MG Sreekumar
Varum Varunnu Vannu	17	"Thaalam Thaalam"	Ouseppachan	Yusufali Kechery	Solo
Varum Varunnu Vannu	18	"ABCD Muthal"	Ouseppachan	Yusufali Kechery	Franco
Swapnam Kondu Thulabharam	19	"Kasthurikuri"	Ouseppachan	Gireesh Puthanchery	Solo
Mullavalliyum Thenmavum	20	"Pachapalunke"	Ouseppachan	Gireesh Puthanchery	Balu
Hariharan Pillai Happy Aanu	21	"Ambaadi Poove"	Stephen Devassy	Rajeev Alunkal	K S Chithra

=== 2004 ===
Film	No	Song	Composer(s)	Lyricist(s)	Co-artist(s)
Njan Salperu Ramankutty	22	"Kaliyaadi Thalir"	Raveendran	B R Prasad	Biju Narayanan
Greetings	23	"Sona Sona"	Raveendran	Gireesh Puthanchery	Solo
Kerala House Udan Vilpanakku	24	"Maashe Edo Maashe"	Ouseppachan	Gireesh Puthanchery	MG Sreekumar
Runway	25	"Pattuvennila"	Suresh Peters	Gireesh Puthanchery	Suresh Peters, Sunanda
Aparichithan	26	"Massam Massam (F)"	Suresh Peters	Gireesh Puthanchery	Renjini Jose
Aparichithan	27	"Massam Massam (S)"	Suresh Peters	Gireesh Puthanchery	Suresh Peters
Chathikkatha Chanthu	28	"Mazha Meettum"	Alex Paul	Gireesh Puthanchery	Balu
Chathikkatha Chanthu	29	"Love Letter"	Alex Paul	Santhosh Varma	Solo
Youth Festival	30	"Kalla Kalla Kochu Kalla"	M Jayachandran	Shibu Chakravarthy	Rajesh Vijay
Youth Festival	31	"Enne Ninakkinnu Priyamalle"	M Jayachandran	Kaithapram Damodaran Namboothiri	Franco
Perumazhakkalam	32	"Meharuba Meharuba"	M Jayachandran	Kaithapram Damodaran Namboothiri	Afsal, Chorus
Vellinakshathram	33	"Pineapple Penne"	M Jayachandran	Kaithapram Damodaran Namboothiri	Franco
Sathyam	34	"Be Happy Man"	M Jayachandran	Kaithapram Damodaran Namboothiri	Vijay Yesudas
Rain Rain Come Again	35	"Themma Themma (F)"	Jassie Gift	Kaithapram Damodaran Namboothiri	Karthika
4 the People	36	"Ninte Mizhi Muna"	Jassie Gift	Kaithapram Damodaran Namboothiri	Jassie Gift
Symphony	37	"Chithramani Kattil (F)"	Deepak Dev	Kaithapram Damodaran Namboothiri	Solo
Udayam	38	"London Cell Phone"	Mohan Sithara	Kaithapram Damodaran Namboothiri	Solo
Manju Poloru Penkutty	39	"Ithile Nee Enthe"	Alphons Joseph	Kaithapram Damodaran Namboothiri	Karthik
Manju Poloru Penkutty	40	"Ithile Nee Enthe [V2]"	Alphons Joseph	Kaithapram Damodaran Namboothiri	Alphons Joseph
Jalolsavam	41	"Kanneerinte"	Alphons Joseph	Vayalar Sarathchandra Varma	Solo
Students	42	"Laisa Laisa (D)"	S P Balasubrahmanyam	Rajeev Alunkal	Afsal
Vettam	43	"I Love You December"	Berny-Ignatius	Rajeev Alunkal	MG Sreekumar, Sayanora Philip
Freedom	44	"Paathiraavayi"	Rinil Jones	Thampi Kannanthanam, Santhosh Varma, Kareem Thodupuzha	Biju Narayanan
Vajram	45	"Njan Nadakkum (poovalla)"	Ouseppachan	Shibu Chakravarthy	Vijay Yesudas
Natturajavu	46	"Que Cera"	M Jayachandran	Gireesh Puthanchery	Alex Kayyalakkal
Monalisa (Dubbed version)	47	"Monalisa"	Valisha-Sandeep	Rajeev Alunkal	Afsal
Monalisa (Dubbed version)	48	"Ente Uyiru Neeyalle"	Valisha-Sandeep	Rajeev Alunkal	Solo
Monalisa (Dubbed version)	49	"O Prithama"	Valisha-Sandeep	Rajeev Alunkal	Solo
Chekavan (Dubbed version)	50	"Pachamilakku"	Mani Sharma	Rajeev Alunkal	Afsal
Chekavan (Dubbed version)	51	"Oh Shanthi (D)"	Mani Sharma	Rajeev Alunkal	Franco, Chorus
Pranayamai (Dubbed version)	52	"Ammanamaakum Kannil"	Raj–Koti	Rajeev Alunkal	MG Sreekumar
Pranayamai (Dubbed version)	53	"En Manassu Nee"	Raj–Koti	Rajeev Alunkal	Madhu Balakrishnan
Koottu	54	"Escottelo"	Mohan Sithara	M D Rajendran	Afsal
Masanagudi Mannadiyar Speaking	55	"Praanamurali Moham"	Pramod Shornur	Yusufali Kechery	Solo
Paanchajanyam	56	"Minnal Kodiyai"	Balabhaskar	Prasad EP	Radhika Thilak
Iruvar (Dubbed Version)	57	"Vennila Vennila"	A R Rahman	Mankombu Gopalakrishnan	Solo

=== 2005 ===
Film	Song	Composer(s)	Lyricist(s)	Co-artist(s)
Pandippada	"Ariyathe Ishttamay (F)"	Suresh Peters	Chittoor Gopi	Solo
Pandippada	"Ariyathe Ishttamay (D)"	Suresh Peters	Chittoor Gopi	Devanand
Deepangal Sakshi	"Kavithe (F)"	Mohan Sithara	Yusufali Kechery	Solo
Deepangal Sakshi	"Poovambante"	Mohan Sithara	Yusufali Kechery	Solo
Pass Pass	"Kuku Kurukka"	Job Kuruvila	Sabari K Ayyappan, Sudhi Nambiar	Afsal
Pass Pass	"Kuku Kuruka [v2]"	Job Kuruvila	Sabari K Ayyappan, Sudhi Nambiar	Afsal
Immini Nalloral	"Komalavally" (Anne Chollile)	M Jayachandran	Gireesh Puthanchery	Rajesh Vijay
Immini Nalloral	"Kootukare"	M Jayachandran	Gireesh Puthanchery	Vijay Yesudas
Junior Senior	"Nattumavin"	M Jayachandran	Kaithapram Damodaran Namboothiri	MG Sreekumar
Athbhutha Dweepu	"Chakkara Mavinte (F)"	M Jayachandran	Kaithapram Damodaran Namboothiri	Solo
Athbhutha Dweepu	"Oridathoridathu"	M Jayachandran	Kaithapram Damodaran Namboothiri	Vidhu Prathap
Boy Friend	"Yo Yo Payya"	Afsal, Alex Kayyalakkal, Renjini Jose	Kaithapram Damodaran Namboothiri	
Annorikkal	"Mattu Ponkal"	Kaithapram Namboothiri	Kaithapram Damodaran Namboothiri	Solo
Soumyam	"Chundari (F)"	Kaithapram Namboothiri	Kaithapram Damodaran Namboothiri	Solo
December	"Alakadalin"	Jassie Gift	Kaithapram Damodaran Namboothiri	Ishaan Dev
Rappakal	"Kadha Kadha"	Mohan Sithara	Kaithapram Damodaran Namboothiri	Vijay Yesudas, Anwar Sadath, Asha Madhu
Rappakal	"Thanka Manassu (F)"	Mohan Sithara	Kaithapram Damodaran Namboothiri	Solo
Kalyana Kurimanam	"Thairani Mulle"	Ronnie Raphael	Bichu Thirumala	Sujatha Mohan
Kalyana Kurimanam	"Keralam Oru"	Ronnie Raphael	Bichu Thirumala	Vidhu Prathap, Nimmi
Dhobiwala	"Maaya Manassukale"	S Kumar	Gireesh Puthanchery	Solo
Seelabathi	"Pathira Manal"	Ramesh Narayan	Prabha Varma	Ramesh Narayan
Maniyarakallan	"Kinnarapattum Paadi"	MG Anil	Sudhamsu	MG Sreekumar, Afsal
OK Chacko Cochin Mumbai	"Pichakapoo"	Sayan Anwar	Sudhamsu	
OK Chacko Cochin Mumbai	"Halchhala"		Sudhamsu	
Krithyam	"Kokkurummum Katte"	D Udayakumar	Gireesh Puthanchery	Solo

=== 2006 ===
Film	Song	Composer(s)	Lyricist(s)	Co-artist(s)
Ennittum	"Swarna Meghame"	Jassie Gift	Kaithapram Damodaran Namboothiri	Vidhu Prathap
Ennittum	"Padapedichu"	Jassie Gift	Kaithapram Damodaran Namboothiri	Jassie Gift
Parayam	"Tik Tik(F)"	Mohan Sithara	Kaithapram Damodaran Namboothiri	Solo
Parayam	"Tik Tik (D)"	Mohan Sithara	Kaithapram Damodaran Namboothiri	Rajesh Vijay
Lion	"Chirimani Mulle"	Deepak Dev	Kaithapram Damodaran Namboothiri	Afsal
Pachakuthira	"Oru Thottavadi"	Ilayaraja	Gireesh Puthanchery	Vijay Yesudas
Pachakuthira	"Varavelkkumo"	Ilayaraja	Gireesh Puthanchery	Madhu Balakrishnan
Lanka	"Kadalezhum"	Rajesh Mohan	B R Prasad	Solo
Nilavu Pole	"Ranjitha Tharakal"	Raj–Koti	Rajeev Alunkal	Afsal
Nilavu Pole	"Pratheekshakal"	Raj–Koti	Rajeev Alunkal	Solo
Colourful	"Swarna Nila"	Sayan Anwar	Rajeev Alunkal	Vidhu Prathap
Boss I Love You (Dubbed version)	"Etho Thamasa"	Kalyan Koduri	Rajeev Alunkal	Vineeth Sreenivasan
Boss I Love You (Dubbed version)	"Hello Boss"	Kalyan Koduri	Rajeev Alunkal	Afsal
Lakshmi	"Madhumozhi"	Ramana Gogula	Rajeev Alunkal	MG Sreekumar
Lakshmi	"Kanthari"	Ramana Gogula	Rajeev Alunkal	Afsal
Chacko Randaaman	"Otta Nokkile"	Sundar C Babu	Joffy Tharakan	Kalabhavan Mani
Highway Police	"Manassinte"	M. K. Arjunan	Sreekumaran Thampi	Solo
Classmates	"Kathirunna Pennalle"	Alex Paul	Vayalar Sarathchandra Varma	Devanand, Pradeep Palluruthy, Soniya Samjad
Pathaka	"Husunul Jamal"	Thej Mervin	Poovachal Khader	MG Sreekumar
Onnaravattu	"Chittaram Kaattathu [v2]"	Hashna Hash	Hashna Hash	Solo
The Don	"Chandana Theril"	Mohan Sithara	Vayalar Sarathchandra Varma	MG Sreekumar
Aadu Thoma	"Manavatti Pennin"	Josi Pullad	Shaji Ellathu	Biju Narayanan
Moonnamathoral	"Peyyukayanu	Ouseppachan	Shibu Chakravarthy	Solo
Notebook	"Hridayavum Hridayavum 1"	Mejo Joseph	Vayalar Sarathchandra Varma	Vineeth Sreenivasan
Notebook	"Hridayavum Hridayavum 2"	Mejo Joseph	Vayalar Sarathchandra Varma	Vineeth Sreenivasan
Pothen Vava	"Raaga[Bit]"	Alex Paul	Vayalar Sarathchandra Varma	Chorus
Pothen Vava	"Manchadi Manimuthu"	Alex Paul	Vayalar Sarathchandra Varma	MG Sreekumar
Baba Kalyani	"Neelamizhipeeli"	Alex Paul	Vayalar Sarathchandra Varma	Vidhu Prathap
Mukhamariyathe	"Mainapenne Kilipenne"	Vijay Dravid	Vijayan Nalanda	Solo

=== 2007 ===
Film	Song	Composer(s)	Lyricist(s)	Co-artist(s)
November Rain	"Aarumaarum"	Anup S Nair	N/A	Srinivas
November Rain	"Dham"	Anup S Nair	N/A	Franco
Avan Chandiyude Makan	Mampoo Pookkum"	Sanjeev Lal	Gireesh Puthanchery	Anwar Sadath
Komban	"Laysa Laysa"	SP Boopathy	Rajeev Alunkal	Afsal
Sketch	"Nishayile"	Prakash Ullyeri	Rajeev Alunkal	Solo
Big B	"Muthumazha Konchal"	Alphons Joseph	Joffy Tharakan	Vineeth Sreenivasan
Abraham Lincoln	"Thakkida Thakkida"	Ouseppachan	Balachandran Chullikkad	Franco
Payum Puli	"Kuku Kuravayai"	Mohan Sithara	Gireesh Puthanchery	Solo
Soorya Kireedam	"Oru Swapna"	Bennet-Veetraag	Rafeeq Ahammed	Renjini Jose, Shruthy
Goal	"Maanam Thelinje"	Vidyasagar	Vayalar Sarathchandra Varma	Vineeth Sreenivasan
Best Friends	"Kandilla Nee"	Valeesha Sandeep	Vayalar Sarathchandra Varma	Solo
Aakasham	"Pachakuruvikal"	Mohan Sithara	Rajeev Alunkal	Sheela Mani, Ajay Sethu Warrier, Aswin AS, Sreeshankar
July 4	"Kanavinte Kadavathu(D)"	Ouseppachan	Shibu Chakravarthy	Vidhu Prathap
July 4	"Kanavinte Kadavathu(F)"	Ouseppachan	Shibu Chakravarthy	Solo
Chocolate	"Thamarayum(F)"	Alex Paul	Vayalar Sarathchandra Varma	Solo
Yogi(Dubbed version)	"Poraamo Yogi"	Ramana Gogula	Siju Thuravoor	Vidhu Prathap
Hero(Dubbed version)	"Kanna Vaada"	Chakri	Siju Thuravoor	Anwar Sadath
Kelkkatha Shabtham (Dubbed version)	"Maayakuthirayil"	Yuvan Shankar Raja	Gireesh Puthanchery	Rahul Nambiar
Dubai Seenu (Dubbed version)	"Dol Dol"	Mani Sharma	Rajeev Alunkal	Afsal
Vikramadithya (Dubbed version)	"Jum Jum Maaya"	M M Keeravani	Mankombu Gopalakrishnan	Unni Menon

=== 2008 ===
Film	Song	Composer(s)	Lyricist(s)	Co-artist(s)
College Kumaran	"Thazhika Kudame"	Ouseppachan	Shibu Chakravarthy	MG Sreekumar
Gopaalapuram	"Nee Nilaavo"	N/A	N/A	Karthik
Annan Thambi	"Ra Chekkanu Pekkali"	Rahul Raj	Bichu Thirumala	Afsal, Pradeep Palluruthy, Smitha Nisanth
One Way Ticket	"Mohiyudheen"	Rahul Raj	Gireesh Puthanchery	Santhosh Kesav
Twenty:20	"Ushassil"	Berny Ignatius	Gireesh Puthanchery	K J Yesudas, K S Chithra, Sujatha Mohan, Madhu Balakrishnan, Afsal, Vineeth Sreenivasan, Jassie Gift, Franco, Anitha Shaiq, Rimi Tomy
Twenty:20	"Oh Priya"	Suresh Peters	Gireesh Puthanchery	Shankar Mahadevan
Chembada	"Ente Pranayathin"	Robin Thirumala	Robin Thirumala	Najim Arshad
Chembada	"Mohabbathin Kadalile"	Robin Thirumala	Firos Thikkodi	Dr.M.K. Muneer
Lollypop	"Vellimani Poo"	Alex Paul	Vayalar Sarathchandra Varma	Franco
Glamour Nagaram (Dubbed version)	"Hoshiyare"	Chakri	Siju Thuravoor	
The Target (Dubbed version)	"Chandamama"	Mani Sharma	Mankombu Gopalakrishnan	Franco
Pournami (Dubbed Version)	"Yamuna Nadi"	Devi Sri Prasad	Mankombu Gopalakrishnan	Solo
Kanal (Dubbed version)	"Vettayaadi"	Chakri	Rajeev Alunkal	Afsal
Thulasi(Dubbed version)	"Nin Kallanaam"	Devisri Prasad	Rajeev Alunkal	Devanand
Bhai (Dubbed Version)	"Nin Kannukalum"	Raghava Lowrense	Siju Thuravoor	Vidhu Prathap
Chandu- The Hot Hero (Dubbed Version)	"Thaka Thaka"	Mani Sharma	Siju Thuravoor	Afsal, Chorus
Company (Dubbed Version)	"Kankonil"	Sandeep Chowdhary	Mankombu Gopalakrishnan	Anwar Sadath

=== 2009 ===
Film	Song	Composer(s)	Lyricist(s)	Co-artist(s)
Swapna Malika	"Aadyanuragathin"	Jai Kishan	Aparna Karimpil	Solo
Vellathooval	"Kothi Kothi "	Johnson	Gireesh Puthanchery	Solo
Colours	"Oh Kanmani "	Suresh Peters	Gireesh Puthanchery	Afsal
Love In Singapore	"Ithu Azhaku "	Suresh Peters	Rajeev Alunkal	Solo
Thirunakkara Perumal	"Kanmani"	Gireesh Surya Narayanan	Rajeev Alunkal	MG Sreekumar
Thirunakkara Perumal	"Padayude Naduvil"	Gireesh Surya Narayanan	Rajeev Alunkal	Jithu Jayaram
Black Dalia	"May Maasam "	Sayan Anwar	Joffy Tharakan	Solo
Currency	"Kari Maanathin "	Siddharth Vipin	Joffy Tharakan	Aswath.T.Ajith, Rahul Rajwi
Mounam	"Janaganamana"	M D Rajendran	Poonkunnam Damodharan	Biju Narayanan, Madhu Balakrishnan, Shobha, Chorus
Mounam	"Janaganamana[F]"	M D Rajendran	Poonkunnam Damodharan	Solo
Pramukhan	"Kanna Karmukil"	Shyam Dharman	Vayalar Sarathchandra Varma	Shyam Dharman
Pramukhan	"Kanmunayaal"	Shyam Dharman	Vayalar Sarathchandra Varma	Jassie Gift
Ranam (Dubbed version)	"Hey Chandu "	Mani Sharma	Siju Thuravoor	Afsal
Keralotsavam	"Kannale"	Shyam Dharman	Vayalar Sarathchandra Varma	Solo
Simhakkutty (Dubbed version)	"Pandu Pandu"	M M Keeravani	Siju Thuravoor	Solo
Simhakkutty (Dubbed version)	"Neeyum Njaanum"	M M Keeravani	Siju Thuravoor	Solo
Operation Duryodhana (Dubbed Version)	"Ek Bar Dekho"	M. M. Srilekha	Mankombu Gopalakrishnan	VR Udayakumar
Souryam (Dubbed Version)	"Kathoram Paayaram"	Mani Sharma	Rajeev Alunkal	Afsal

=== 2010 ===
Film	Song	Composer(s)	Lyricist(s)	Co-artist(s)
Advocate Lakshmanan – Ladies Only	"Aru Padai"	Mohan Sithara	Anil Panachooran	Pradeep Palluruthy, Bhavya Shaji, Thulasi Yatheendran
Patham Adhyayam	"Enikkinangum Changathi"	Mohan Sithara	Ezhancheri Ramachandran	Vidhu Prathap
Kanmazha Peyyum Munpe	"Kathu Vannu Chare"	Mejo Joseph	Vayalar Sarathchandra Varma	Vidhu Prathap
Vandae Maatharam	"Chirichorungum"	D Imman	Vayalar Sarathchandra Varma	Solo
Black Stallion	"Nanathin"	Abhishek	M.D.Rajendran	Tippu
Holidays	"Holidays"	Alex Paul	Santhosh Varma	Manjari, Vidhu Prathap
Holidays	"Pathinettazhakotha"	Alex Paul	Kaithapram Damodaran Namboothiri	Madhu Balakrishnan
Body Guard	"Machiyammaikku"	Ouseppachan	Kaithapram Damodaran Namboothiri	Pradeep Palluruthy
Kaaryasthan	"Neeyinnenne Maranno (D)"	Berny-Ignatius	Kaithapram Damodaran Namboothiri	George Peter
Kaaryasthan	"Neeyinnenne Maranno (F)"	Berny-Ignatius	Kaithapram Damodaran Namboothiri	Solo
Thoovalkattu	"Nagamalika (F)"	Kaithapram Viswanathan	Kaithapram Damodaran Namboothiri	Solo
Penpattanam	"Penpattanam (theme)"	M G Sreekumar	Kaithapram Damodaran Namboothiri	Solo
Penpattanam	"Chandanathin"	M G Sreekumar	P T Vinu	Solo
Plus 2	"Thane"	Manu Ramesan	S. Rameshan Nair	Solo

=== 2011 ===
Film	Song	Composer(s)	Lyricist(s)	Co-artist(s)
Payyans	"Thennal Chirakundo"	Alphons Joseph	Kaithapram Damodaran Namboothiri	Karthik
Payyans	"Thennal Chirakundo (unplugged)"	Alphons Joseph	Kaithapram Damodaran Namboothiri	Karthik
Mohabbath	"Chantham Thikanjoru"	K A Latheef	Santhosh Varma	Solo
Janapriyan	"Erivenal Poovukalayi"	Rinil Gowtham	Santhosh Varma	Sudeep Kumar
Bangkok Summer	"Engane Njan"	Ouseppachan	Shibu Chakravarthy	Anoop Sankar, Franco
Sandwich	"Kombulla Maane"	Jayan Pisharady	Murukan Kattakada	M G Sreekumar
Arabi Ponnu	"Ee Rathri Mazhayil"	Vijesh Gopal	Vijay Narayambalam	
Nayanam	"Aarum Parayathen"	Sivadas Warrier	Bharanikkavu Shivakumar	
Badrinath (D)	"Chiranjeeva Chiranjeeva"	M M Keeravani	Siju Thuravoor	Afsal

=== 2012 ===
Film	Song	Composer(s)	Lyricist(s)	Co-artist(s)
Mullamottum Munthiricharum	"Neeyo Neeyo"	Mohan Sithara	Kaithapram Damodaran Namboothiri	Vishnu Mohan Sithara
Naughty Professor	"Jig Jinga"	Jassie Gift	Baburaj	Shami Samad
Sriramarajyam	"Mangalam Raghurama"	Ilayaraja	Mankombu Gopalakrishnan	Solo
Sriramarajyam	"Thamboola Ragangal"	Ilayaraja	Mankombu Gopalakrishnan	Solo
Neeranjanam	"Prema Vrindhavanam"	Kuzhalmandam Ramakrishnan	Kuzhalmandam Ramakrishnan	Madhu Balakrishnan

=== 2013 ===
Film	Song	Composer(s)	Lyricist(s)	Co-artist(s)
Geethanjali	"Pavizha Munthiri"	Vidyasagar	O. N. V. Kurup	M G Sreekumar
Nadodi Mannan	"Machan Ente"	Vidyasagar	Rajeev Alunkal	Udit Narayan, Rimi Tomy, Renjini Jose
Bangles	"Pathira Poo"	Dr.Suvid Wilson	Rajeev Alunkal	
Radio	"Mandara Kombathu"	Mohan Sithara	Rafeeq Ahammed	
Sringaravelan	"Nalambalamanayan"	Berny-Ignatius	Rafeeq Ahammed	Sudeep Kumar
Zachariayude Garbhinikal	"Veyil Chilla"	Vishnu-Sharreth	Engandiyoor Chandrashekharan	Vishnu Mohan Sithara
Choodan (D)	"Madhumasa"	S. Thaman	Siju Thuravoor	Madhu Balakrishnan
Choodan (D)	"Vaayo Vaayo"	S. Thaman	Siju Thuravoor	

=== 2014 ===
Film	Song	Composer(s)	Lyricist(s)	Co-artist(s)
Manglish	"Daffodile"	Gopi Sunder	B. K. Harinarayanan	Haricharan
Villali Veeran	"Nin Kannil"	S. A. Rajkumar	B. K. Harinarayanan	Ranjith
Peruchazhi	"Po Mone Dinesha"	Arrora	Rajiv Nair	Solo
Vikramadithyan	"Megham Mazhavillin"	Bijibal	Rafeeq Ahammed	Madhu Balakrishnan
Persiakaran	"Chirakil Poompodi"	Renjith Melappattu	Rafeeq Ahammed	Karthik

=== 2015 ===
Film	Song	Composer(s)	Lyricist(s)	Co-artist(s)
Pathemari	"Ithu Paaro"	Bijibal	Rafeeq Ahammed	Solo
Kanthari	"Pranayam Poothirangum"	Arun Chowdary	Ravi Menon	Mahadevan
Maanikyam	"Ormayil Ee"	S. M. shiq Illahi	N/A	Srinivas
Rag Rangeela	"Cheru Punchiri"	Yousuf Muhammed	Yousuf Muhammed	Solo

=== 2016 ===
Film	Song	Composer(s)	Lyricist(s)	Co-artist(s)
Welcome to Central Jail	"Enthanen Manassile"	Berny-Ignatius	Santhosh Varma	Madhu Balakrishnan
Romanov	"Ezhu Nirangal"	Jeevan Nandan	Guruji Ankamali	P. Jayachandran

=== 2017 ===
Film	Song	Composer(s)	Lyricist(s)	Co-artist(s)
C/O Saira Banu	"Hrudaya Vathil"	Mejo Joseph	B. K. Harinarayanan	Vineeth Sreenivasan
Sunday Holiday	"Aaro Koode"	Deepak Dev	Jis Joy	Prakash Babu
Masterpiece	"Wake Up"	Deepak Dev	B. K. Harinarayanan	Haricharan
Kaattu	"Kana Kangiren"	Deepak Dev	Dharan	
Kaattu	"Venal Kattil"	Deepak Dev	Rafeeq Ahammed	
Bobby	"Ithal Idumoru Nimisham"	Devika. S. Murali	S. Ramesan Nair	Karthik

=== 2018 ===
Film	Song	Composer(s)	Lyricist(s)	Co-artist(s)
Udalaazham	"Poomathe"	Sithara, Midhun Jayaraj	Manu Manjith	Pushpavathy
B.Tech	"Peda Glass"	Rahul Raj	Vinayak Sasikumar	Jassie Gift, Kavya Ajit
Sukhamano Daveede	"Katte Katte"	Mohan Sithara	Kaithapram Damodaran Namboothiri	Najim Arshad
Panchavarnathatha	"Panchavarn Thatha"	M Jayachandran	Santhosh Varma	Haricharan
Nithya Haritha Nayakan	"Kanaka Mulla"	Ranjin Raj V.K	Haseena Kanam	Mohammad Maqbool Manzoor
Bhaagamathie(D)	"Mandara Mandara"	S. Thaman	Gopala Krishna	
Ente Peru Surya (D)	"Beautyful Life"	Vishal–Shekhar	Siju Thuravoor	Zia Ul Haq
Karinkannan	"Thinkal Polente"	Mohan Sithara	Sreekovil Kadathanad	
Moonnam Niyamam	"Chellacheru Kuruvi"	Shibu Joseph	Santhosh Kodanadu	
Oru Vathil Kotta	"Priyane Varu"	Midhun Murali	Devadas	
Wonder Boys	"Aali Bhaba"	Ronnie Raphael	B. K. Harinarayanan	
Ottakoru Kaamukan	"Aathmaavil"	Vishnu Mohan Sithara	B. K. Harinarayanan	Sachin Raj
Avarkkoppam	"Kanavukalale"	Girish Surya Narayanan	Ajith. N. Nair	Girish Surya Narayanan

=== 2019 ===
Film	Song	Composer(s)	Lyricist(s)	Co-artist(s)
Lucifer	"Raftara Nache"	Deepak Dev	Tanishq Nabar	
Oru Vathil Kotta	"Priyane Varoo"	Midhun Murali	S. Devadas	

=== Albums ===
- Ini Varumo- (Herself Composing)
- Krishna-The Enternal (fusion/Meditation) - Composing her with Gireesh Chengannur
- Manicheppu
- Chempakame
- Onnalla
- Malayalippennu
- Krishnapriya
- Mayakkannaa
- Ithu Premamo
- Ninneyum thedi [mailanchi]

Serials

- Kanakkinavu
- Manaporutham
- Makalude Amma
- Minnukettu
- Geethanjali

== Discography: Other Languages ==
=== Tamil ===
Year	Film	Song	Composer(s)	Lyricist(s)	Co-artist(s)
2005	Raam	"Boom Boom"	Yuvan Shankar Raja	Snehan	Yuvan Shankar Raja, Premji Amaran, Tippu
2008	Sadhu Miranda	"Aagayam Kaanamal"	Deepak Dev	Na. Muthukumar	Srinivas
2018	Bhaagamathie	"Mandara Mandara"	S. Thaman	Vivek	

=== Telugu ===
Year	Film	Song	Composer(s)	Lyricist(s)	Co-artist(s)
2009	Kick	"Gore Gore"	S. Thaman	Sirivennela Sitaramasastri	Karthik
2009	Anjaneyulu	"Em Vayaso"	S. Thaman	Krishna Chaitanya	Naveen

=== Kannada ===
Year	Film	Song	Composer(s)	Lyricist(s)	Co-artist(s)
2009	Vayuputra	"Baare Baare Gopamma"	V. Harikrishna	V. Nagendra Prasad	Rahul Nambiar
2009	Vayuputra	"Rock A Body"	V. Harikrishna	Kaviraj	Tippu
2012	Govindaya Namaha	"Sura Sundara"	Gurukiran	Jayanth Kaikini	Madhu Balakrishnan
2013	Hara	"Yaare Ni Sundari	Jassie Gift	Jayanth Kaikini	Santhosh Venky
2018	Amma I Love You	"Ee Mounave"	Gurukiran	Kaviraj	

== Television ==
- Idea Star Singer as Team captain (Asianet)
- Gandharva sangeetham as Host (Kairali TV)
- 2 Crore Apple Mega Star as Host (Jeevan TV)
- Duet as Host (Amrita TV)
- Music Mojo as Singer (Kappa TV)
- Pathinalam Ravu as Judge (Media One)
- Veruthe Alla Bharya Season 3 as Grand Finale Host (Mazhavil Manorama)
- Padam Namuk Padam as Judge (Mazhavil Manorama)
- Still Standing as Participant (Mazhavil Manorama)
- Top Singer Season 1 as Judge (Flowers TV)
- Super 4 Season 2 as Judge (Mazhavil Manorama)
- Atham Pathu Ruchi 2021 as Celebrity presenter (Mazhavil Manorama)
- Super 4 Kids as Judge (Mazhavil Manorama)

== Appeared films ==
- 2008 - Thirakkatha as RJ
- 2010 - Kaaryasthan as Herself
- 2021 - Vidhi : The Verdict as Herself
