= Yuvasena =

2004 Telugu film by Jayaraj

- DVD Cover
- Directed by: Jayaraj
- Written by: Jayaraj; Marudhuri Raja (dialogues)
- Based on: 4 The People (2004) by Jayaraj
- Produced by: Sravanthi Ravi Kishore
- Starring: Bharath; Sharwanand; Kishore; Padma Kumar; Narain; Gopika
- Cinematography: Gunasekhar
- Edited by: Manohar
- Music by: Jassie Gift
- Production company: Sravanthi Movies
- Release date: 12 November 2004
- Running time: 127 minutes
- Country: India
- Language: Telugu
- Budget: 1.2 crore

Yuvasena (transl. Young troop) is a 2004 Indian Telugu-language vigilante film directed by Jayaraj and produced by Sravanthi Ravi Kishore under the Sri Sravanthi Movies banner. The film stars Bharath, Sharwanand, Kishore, Padma Kumar, Narain, and Gopika in lead roles. It is a remake of Jayaraj's Malayalam film 4 the People (2004).

== Cast ==
- Bharath as Vivek
- Sharwanand as Aravind
- Kishore as Siva
- Padma Kumar as Rafi
- Narain as Sarath Chandra (credited as Suresh Menon)
- Gopika
- Revathi
- Madhuri
- Jeeva as a police officer
- Narra Venkateswara Rao as a minister
- Jr. Relangi
- Melkote as a professor
- Sekhar (special appearance in the song "Vonee Vesukunna")
- Jani Master (special appearance in the song "Vonee Vesukunna")

== Production ==
After the success of his Malayalam film 4 the People, Jayaraj remade the film in Telugu with Sravanthi Ravi Kishore as the producer. The film retains much of the cast of the original film. It marks the film debut of lyricist Ramajogayya Sastry and cinematographer Guna. This film marks the entry of Bharath into Telugu cinema after the success of the dubbed Telugu version of Boys (2003). It also marks the Telugu debut of Jayaraj, Gopika, Narain and Jassie Gift. Malayalam actor Narain was credited as Suresh Menon in the film.

== Soundtrack ==
Yuvasena

Soundtrack album by Jassie Gift
- Released: 2004
- Genre: Film soundtrack
- Length: 22:25
- Label: Aditya Music

Jassie Gift chronology
4 the People (2003)	Yuvasena (2004)	Ennittum (2004)

The songs were reused from the original film 4 the People. The footage for the songs "Malliswarive" and "Ye Dikkuna Nuvvunna" were also reused from the original.

All lyrics are written by Sirivennela Seetharama Sastry & Ramajogayya Sastry; all music is composed by Jassie Gift.

Yuvasena: 4 The People
No.	Title	Singer(s)	Length
1.	"Malliswarive"	Jassie Gift	04:29
2.	"Vooni Vesukunna"	Jassie Gift, Smitha	04:41
3.	"Pongey Alavastey (Ye Dikkuna Nuvvunna)"	Jassie Gift, Ishaan Dev	04:15
4.	"Loka Samastha"	Sandeep	04:41
5.	"Swapnalanu"	Sandeep	04:19
Total length:			22:25

== Release ==
The film released on 4 November, coinciding with Diwali. Unlike the original, the film was a box office failure, but did not lose money due to the film's shoestring budget.

Gudipoodi Srihari of The Hindu compared the film with Tagore. Jeevi of Idlebrain.com said that "The plus points are music and modern taking. Minus points are predictability in story and no surprise/shocking elements". A critic from Full Hyderabad wrote, "Jassie Gift's music is the only point of the movie worth sitting up for".
