= Jassie Gift =

Indian singer (born 1975)

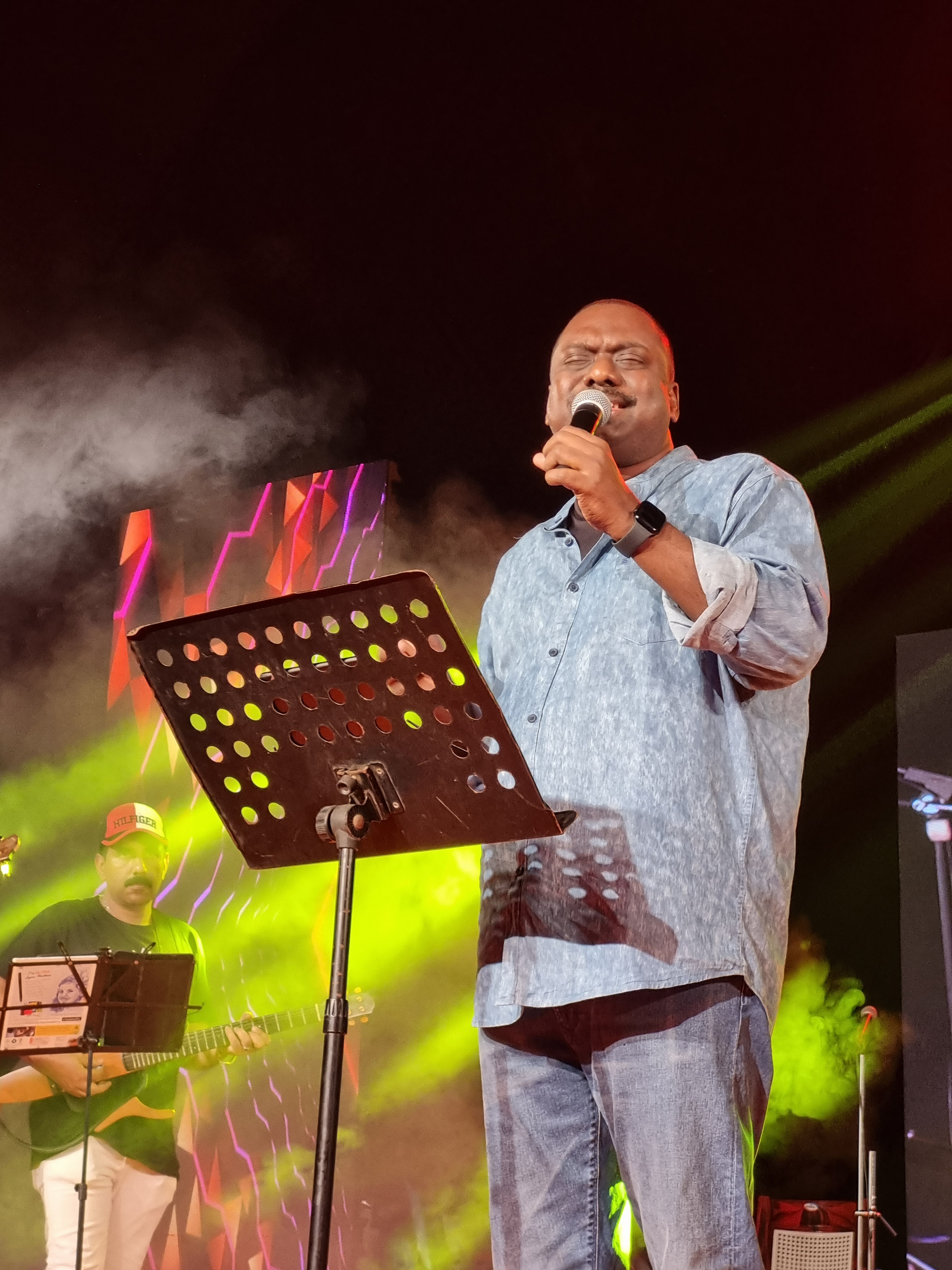
- Jassie Gift performing at College of Engineering Chengannur

Background information
- Born: November 27, 1975 (age 50); Vithura, Thiruvananthapuram, Kerala, India
- Occupations: Music composer; playback singer; music producer
- Years active: 2002–present
- Spouse: Athulya Jayakumar (m. 2012)

Jassie Gift is an Indian cinematic music composer and playback singer. He composes songs and sings for Malayalam, Kannada, Tamil and Telugu films. He became famous after the release of the song "Lajjavathiye" from the film 4 The People.

He won the Best Music Director award at The Bangalore Times Film Awards 2011. He is credited with popularising Rapping and Hip-hop in Kerala. He is also known for Sanju Weds Geetha (2011), Anniyan (2005) and Myna (2013).

== Biography ==
Hailing from Vithura, Jassie was born to Isaac Gift Israel and Rajamma. He was interested in music from childhood and was highly influenced by western music. He admired Ilayaraja and was a fan of Freddie Mercury. He had lessons in western piano from a young age and started singing and playing the keyboard in local bands. He is a singer and keyboard player of the band Moby Dick.

He entered the film music industry under the guidance of director Jayaraj. Before entering films he composed songs for a couple of albums in Malayalam, including the hit album Soona Soona, and also composed singles. He pioneered the use of reggae fusion music in the Malayalam music industry with the backing roots of Indian ragas. Jassie's first film composition was for the movie Saphalam. His songs written for the movie 4 The People became hits in Kerala, especially "Lajjavathiye", and his music contributed to the success of the film, which became 2004's biggest Malayalam film. The film was later remade in Tamil, and also as Malliswarive in Telugu The song was successful in all languages.

Jassie mixed Indian and western music on the album, Rain Rain Come Again, as well as the music for the Kannada film Hudugaata, and the songs "Eno Onthara", "Mandakiniye" and "Ommomme Heegu". He has worked with many South Indian musicians such as Harris Jayaraj, Devisri Prasad, Yuvan Shankar Raja, and M M Keeravani, and Anirudh Ravichander, and collaborated with many music directors from south India. He composed songs for the movie Sanju Weds Geetha, sung by Shreya Ghoshal and Sonu Nigam.

Jassie Gift has a master's degree in Philosophy from University College Thiruvananthapuram, and a PhD in Philosophy from Kannur University on the topic of "The Philosophy of Harmony and Bliss with Reference to Advaita and Buddhism".

== Personal life ==
On 11 September 2012, Jassie married Athulya Jayakumar, who accomplished a PhD in Information Technology/Physics from Kannur University. On 24 December 2021, Jassie Gift has been appointed as chairman of Kerala State Development Corporation for Christian Converts from Scheduled Castes and the Recommended Communities.

== Accolades ==
Year	Award	Category	Work	Result	Notes	Ref.
2004	Vanitha Film Awards	Best Music Director	4 the People	Won		
2004	Asianet Film Awards	Popular Song	4 the People	Won		
2011	Filmfare Awards – South	Best Music Director – Kannada	Sanju Weds Geetha	Won		
2011	Suvarna Film Awards	Best Music Director	Sanju Weds Geetha	Won		
2011	The Bangalore Times	Best Music Director	Sanju Weds Geetha	Won		

== Discography ==
=== As a composer ===
Year	Title	Language	Notes	Ref.
2002	Bhibatsa	Hindi		
2003	Saphalam	Malayalam		
2003	The King Maker Leader	Malayalam		
2004	4 the People	Malayalam	Won Vanitha Film Awards for popular song (Best Music Director), Won Asianet Film Awards for popular song	
2004	Rain Rain Come Again	Malayalam	Also actor	
2004	Yuvasena	Telugu	remake of 4 the People, also re-used songs	
2005	December	Malayalam		
2006	Ashwaroodan	Malayalam		
2006	Ennittum	Malayalam		
2006	Balram vs. Tharadas	Malayalam		
2007	Hudugaata	Kannada	Re-used songs from 4 the People and Shambhu	
2007	Thee Nagar	Tamil		
2007	Saval	Telugu		
2008	Vilayattu	Tamil		
2009	Pattalam	Tamil		
2009	Hatrick Hodi Maga	Kannada		
2009	Parichaya	Kannada		
2010	Pokkiri Raja	Malayalam		
2010	3 Char Sau Bees	Malayalam		
2011	Sanju Weds Geetha	Kannada	Won Film fare Award for Best Music Director (Kannada), Won Suvarna Film Awards for best music director, Won The Bangalore Times Best Music Director Award	
2011	China Town	Malayalam		
2011	Shyloo	Kannada	Won Mirchi Music Awards for Best male singer (Ishaan Dev)	
2011	Angane Thudangi	Telugu	Malayalam version composed by Jassie based on soundtrack from this film	
2011	Seniors	Malayalam		
2012	Dev Son of Mudde Gowda	Kannada		
2012	Nidra	Malayalam		
2012	Kiladi Kitty	Kannada		
2012	Naughty Professor	Malayalam		
2012	Achante Aanmakkal	Malayalam		
2012	Galaate	Kannada		
2012	Myna	Kannada		
2013	D Company	Malayalam	Guest Composer	
2013	Shathru	Kannada		
2013	Silk Sakkath Hot	Kannada		
2014	Aryan	Kannada		
2014	Masala Republic	Malayalam		
2014	Hara	Kannada		
2014	Sivajinagara	Kannada		
2015	Rebel	Kannada		
2015	Male	Kannada		
2015	Luv U Alia	Kannada		
2015	Style	Malayalam		
2016	Appuram Bengal Ippuram Thiruvithamkoor	Malayalam		
2016	Tyson	Kannada	2 songs only	
2016	Kala Bhairava	Kannada		
2016	Crazy Boy	Kannada		
2016	Eera Veyyil	Tamil		
2016	Dum	Malayalam	Also Background Music	
2016	Zoom	Malayalam	Guest Composer	
2017	Hai	Kannada		
2017	Chicken Kokkachi	Malayalam	Also Background Music	
2017	Jani	Kannada	25th Film as Composer	
2018	Rajasimha	Kannada		
2018	Prema Baraha	Kannada/Tamil	Tamil version is Sollividava	
2018	Ivide Ee Nagarathil	Malayalam		
2018	Jeevitham Oru Mukhammoodi	Malayalam		
2019	Mafi Dona	Malayalam		
2019	Trip	Malayalam		
2020	3rd Class	Kannada		
2021	Chiri	Malayalam		
2022	Louis	Malayalam		
2022	Khaki Pada	Malayalam		
2023	Momo in Dubai	Malayalam		
2023	O Manase	Kannada		
2023	Lockdown Diaries	Tamil		
2024	Padikkadha Pakkangal	Tamil		
2024	Gowri	Kannada		
2024	Taj	Kannada		
2025	Shanthamee Raathriyil	Malayalam		
2025	Flirt	Kannada	Songs only	
2025	Marutha	Kannada	One song only	
2026
2026	Aazhi	Tamil		
2026	Rolex	Kannada		
2026	Jayakrishna	Kannada		
2026	Yuvanakshatra	Kannada		

=== As a singer ===
==== Kannada songs ====
Year	Song	Album	Co-singers	Composer
2006	"Kode Kode Kobri Mitayi"	Suntaragaali	Anuradha Sriram	Sadhu Kokila
2007	"Mandakiniye Née Seedilina Kiliye"	Hudugata	Vasundhara Das	Jassie Gift
2007	"Stylo Stylo"	Hudugata	George Peter, Emil, Prasanna	Jassie Gift
2008	"Bangari Yare Nee"	Gaja	Chaitra H. G.	V. Harikrishna
2009	"Duniya Ninde Nee Hodimaga"	Hatrick Hodi Maga	Chetan Sosca	Jassie Gift
2009	Helbide Helbide	Birugaali	Solo	Arjun Janya
2009	"Jeo Jeenedo"	Parichaya	Baba Sehgal	Jassie Gift
2009	"Jigi Jigi Jigidu"	Parichaya	Alisha Chinai, Blaaze	Jassie Gift
2010	"Ravana Seethe Kadda"	Sanju Weds Geetha	Solo	Jassie Gift
2011	"Ee Manasinali"	Shyloo	Chaitra H. G.	Jassie Gift
2011	"Thuppa Beka Thuppa"	Kalla Malla Sulla	Sunitha	Alex Paul
2012	"Naavu Hingene"	Munjane	Oscar	S. Narayan
2014	"Kariya Kariya	Shivajinagara	Chaitra H. G.	Jassie Gift
2015	"Nannedeya Pustaka"	Male	Akanksha Badami	Jassie Gift
2015	"Marethu Bidu"	Male	Sharanya	Jassie Gift
2015	"Bulbul Mathadakilva"	Male	Supriya Lohith	Jassie Gift

==== Tulu songs ====
Year	Song	Album	Co-singers	Composer
2026	"Punname Kann"	Picture (2026 film)		Samuel Aby

==== Malayalam songs ====
Year	Song	Album	Singers	Composer
2004	"Annakkili"	4 The People	Jassie Gift	Jassie Gift
2004	"Lajjavathiye Ninte"	4 The People	Jassie Gift, Ishaan Dev	Jassie Gift
2004	"Ninte Mizhimuna"	4 The People	Jassie Gift, Jyotsna	Jassie Gift
2004	"Kannampothi"	Rain Rain Come Again	Jassie Gift, Thara Thomas	Jassie Gift
2004	"Kiss of Death"	Rain Rain Come Again	Jassie Gift, Thara Thomas	Jassie Gift
2004	"Krishna"	Rain Rain Come Again	Jassie Gift	Jassie Gift
2004	"Maya Mazhayae"	Rain Rain Come Again	Jassie Gift	Jassie Gift
2004	"Nillu Nillu"	Rain Rain Come Again	Jassie Gift	Jassie Gift
2004	"Poovinnullil"	Rain Rain Come Again	Jassie Gift	Jassie Gift
2004	"Thenmmadikate"	Rain Rain Come Again	Jassie Gift	Jassie Gift
2005	"Pavakali"	Makalkku	Jassie Gift	Ramesh Narayan
2005	"Kadumthudi"	December	Jassie Gift, Chithra Iyer	Jassie Gift
2005	"Niramanam"	December	Jassie Gift	Jassie Gift
2006
2006	"Thakadhimithom"	Arya	Jassie Gift	Devi Sri Prasad
2006	"Matthaapoo"	Balram vs. Tharadas	Jassie Gift, Anwar Sadath, Afsal, Rimi Tomy	Jassie Gift
2006	"Pada Pedichu"	Ennittum	Jassie Gift, Jyotsana	Jassie Gift
2006	"Kunninte Meethe"	Achanurangatha Veedu	Jassie Gift	Alex Paul
2006	"Pottu Thotta"	Palunku	Jassie Gift, P.Jayachandhran, Sheela Mani	Mohan Sithara
2006	"Ente Saghiye"	Nanma	Jassie Gift, Sheela Mani	Mohan Sithara
2006	"Anthivarum"	Aswaroodan	Pushpavanam Kuppusamy, Jose Sagar, Anu Praveen, Roshni, Jassie Gift, Delsy Ninan	Jassie Gift
2006	"Azhakaalila"	Aswaroodan	Jassie Gift, Akhila Anand	Jassie Gift
2006	"Oru Penkidaavu"	Prajapathy	Jassie Gift, Sujatha	Thej Mervin
2006	"Hey Sathyabhama"	Lakshmi	Jassie Gift, Shankar Mahadevan, Manjari	Ramana Gogula
2007	"Nerathe Kalathethi"	Speed Track	Jassie Gift, George Peter, Deepak Dev	Deepak Dev
2008	"Chemban Kaale"	Annan Thampi	Jassie Gift	Rahul Raj
2008	"Attam Bombumayi"	One Way Ticket	Jassie Gift	Rahul Raj
2008	"Gokula Paala"	Parthan Kanda Paralokam	Jassie Gift	M.Jayachandhran
2009	"Thattum Muttum Thalam"	Puthiya Mukham	Jassie Gift, Sindhu Rajaram, Deepak Dev	Deepak Dev
2009	"Ponalle Minnalle"	Robin Hood	Jassie Gift	M.Jayachandhran
2009	"Bomma Bomma"	Sambhu	George Peter, Jassie Gift, Vipin, Ishaan Dev	Jassie Gift
2009	"Ponnambiliye"	Sambhu	Jassie Gift	Jassie Gift
2009	"Samba Salsa"	Daddy Cool	Anuradha Sriram, Jassie Gift	Bijibal
2010
2010	"Pathalle"	Ring Tone	Jassie Gift, Anitha, Ishaan Dev	Ishaan Dev
2010	"Ole ole"	In Ghost House Inn	Jassie Gift, Anitha	Alex Paul
2010	"Manikya Kallin"	Pokkiri Raja	Jassie Gift, Malathy, Ananthu	Jassie Gift
2011	"Innu Penninnu"	China Town	Jassie Gift, Manjari, Rajalakshmi	Jassie Gift
2011	"Aaraanu Koottu"	China Town	Afsal, Pradeep Palluruthy, Jassie Gift	Jassie Gift
2011	"Mohapattam"	China Town	Afsal, Jassie Gift, Ranjith, Rijiya	Jassie Gift
2011	"Ithiri Chakkara Nulli"	Seniors	Jassie Gift, Imran, Anuradha Sriram	Jassie Gift
2011	"Kannadachu"	Ulakam Chuttum Valiban	Jassie Gift	Mohan Sithara
2011	"Ashwaroodanaya"	Manushya Mrugam	Jassie Gift	Sayan Anwar
2012	" Pacha Panamkili"	Mullamottum Munthiricharum	Jassie Gift	Mohan Sithara
2012	"Thalam Thiruthalam"	Naughty Professor	Jassie Gift. Manjari	Jassie Gift
2013	"Annorunnal"	Teens	Jassie Gift, P.K Sunil Kumar, Sujesh, Hari, Abhilash	Viswajith
2013	"Viruthananu"	Blackberry	Jassie Gift, Sithara	Bijibal
2014	"Muthu Penne"	Njan steve lopez	Jassie Gift	Shahabaz Aman
2014	"Kanji Massam"	Ring Master	Vijay Yesudas, Jassie Gift, Nadirsha, Gopi Sundar, Sayanora Philip	Gopi Sunder
2015	"Uppinu Pokana"	Utopiayile rajavu	Vaikom Vijayalakshmi, Jassie Gift, Rahul R. Nath	Ouseppachan
2015	"Kavalam Kayalil"	ATM	Jassie Gift. Arun Alat	Antony John
2016	"Kalla Kannaal Karalinakath"	Anyarkku Praveshanamilla	Jassie Gift. Anjaly Sugunan	Varun Raghav
2016	"Onnu Randu Moonu"	Gold Coins	Jassie Gift, Chorus	Ouseppachan
2017	"Theyyamthara"	Kadam Katha	Jassie Gift	Deepankuran
2017	"Kalam Poyalun"	Masterpiece	Jassie Gift	Deepak Dev
2017	"Mylanchi"	Masterpiece	Jassie Gift	Deepak Dev
2018	"Mutta Song"	Rosapoo	Jassie Gift, Antony Daasan	sushin shyam
2018	"Thamarapoo"	Kuttanadan Marpappa	Jassie Gift	Rahul Raj
2018	"Peda Glassu"	BTech	Jassie Gift, Jyotsana	Rahul Raj
2018	"Kokka Bonga"	Ivide Ee Nagarathil	Jassie Gift	Jassie Gift
2019	"Lonappa"	Lonappante Mamodeesa	Jassie Gift	Alphons Joseph
2019	"Kili Penne"	Zam Zam	Jassie Gift, Sithara	Amit Trivedi
2019	"Mera Naam Shaji"	Mera Naam Shaji	Jassie Gift, Nadirshah, Suraaj S Vasudev	Emil Mohammed
2019	"Muttathe Kombile"	Oru Yamandan Premakadha	Jassie Gift, Benny Dayal	Nadirshah
2019	"Entha Moorye"	Oru Desa Visesham	Jassie Gift	Saroj Unnikrishnan
2019	"Kaavumpuram"	Upama	Jassie Gift, Subin Kumar	
2019	"Kumblanga Kattatharu"	My Great Grandfather	Jassie Gift, Shankar, Vishnu Mohansithara, Mithun	Vishnu Mohan Sithara
2020	"Edan Thottathin Udayone"	Al Mallu	Jassie Gift, Akhila Anand, Ranjin Raj	Ranjin Raj
2020	"Parakkatte Velichamengum"	Uriyadi	Vaikom Vijayalakshmi, Jassy Gifft	Ishaan Dev
2020	"Ponnin Niramulla"	Kummattikadha	Jassie Gift	Arjun V Akshaya
2021	"Poy Maranja Kaalathin"	Black Coffee	Jassie Gift	Bijibal
2021	"Neramaayee"	Member Ramesan Onpatham Ward	Jassie Gift	kailas Menon
2021	"Kanakam"	Kanakam Kaamini Kalaham	Jassie Gift	Yakzan Periera, Neha Nair
2022	"Kannu Kondu Nulli"	Prakashan Parakkatte	Jassie Gift	Shaan Rahaman
2022	"Ottamundu"	Vishudha Mejo	Jassie Gift, Vaikom Vijayalaksmi	Justin Varghees
2022	"Raman Thedum"	Oh Meri Lailaa	Jassie Gift, Ankit Menon, Shabareesh Varma	Ankit Menon
2023	"Angu Dhoore"	Louis	Jassie Gift.	Jassie Gift
2023	"Daasa"	O.Baby	Jassie Gift	Varun Krishna, Pranav Da
2023	"Parakkum Parava Poley"	Otta	Jassie Gift, Alphons Joseph, Yazin Nizar Malathy, Swetha Ashok	M. Jayachandran
2024	"Panchavarnna Kiliye Kiliye"	Pattapakal	Jassie Gift	Shaan Rahman
2024	"Appi Appi"	Thekku Vadakk	Jassie Gift, Sam C.S	Sam C.S
2024	"Kannu Randum Chimmathe"	1 Princess Street	Jassie Gift	Prince George
2024	"Valentine Song"	1 Princess Street	Jassie Gift	Prince George
2024	"Vaadaa Vaadaa Nere"	Sthanarthi Sreekuttan	Jassie Gift, P S Jayahari, TS Sooryakiran	P S Jayahari
2025	Nazrani Penkutty	Ennu Swantham Punyalan	Jassie Gift, Sithara	Sam C.S
2025	"Rocket Science"	Get Set Baby	Jassie Gift	Sam C.S
2025	"Moonnilu Moothon Prince"	Prince and Family	Jassie Gift, Sanal Dev, Sruthy Sivadas, Dakshina Indu Mithun, Chinmayi Kiranlal, Shreys Rupesh, Akash Ajay	Sanal Dev
2025	"Marghazhiye"	Shanthamee Rathriyil	Varsha Renjith, Jassie Gift	Jassie Gift
2025	"Pub Crawling"	Shanthamee Rathriyil	Jassie Gift, Akhila Anand, Suraaj S Vasudev, Beenu M Balakrishnan, Raazi, Saranya Nair, Satheesh Karthik, Suresh Kalyani, Sajjin Jayaraj	Jassie Gift
2025	"Thazhekattuthala"	Shanthamee Rathriyil	Jassie Gift, Vijeesh Lal, Ramyath Raman	Jassie Gift
2025	"Antham Vittoru Paachilu Kandaa"	Machante Maalakha	Jassie Gift, Chorus	Ouseppachan
2025	"Hasthasootram"	Vala	Jassie Gift	Govind Vasantha
2025	"Summava"	Innocent	Jassie Gift, Anarkali Marikar, Kili Paul	Jay Stellar
2025	"Shanthi Samadhaan"	The Pet Detective	Jassie Gift	Pranav Prakash
2026	"Thithaaram Maarippenne"	Magic Mushrooms	Jassie gift, Nadirshah, Ranjini Jose	Nadirshah
2026	Jee Jaa Jaalathe	Titans	Jassie Gift, Anila Rajeev	Dawn Vincent

==== Tamil songs ====
Year	Song	Album	Singers	Composer
2004	"Undan Vizhimunai"	4 Students	Jassie Gift, Ganga	Jassie Gift
2004	"Lajjavathiye"	4 Students	Jassie Gift	Jassie Gift
2004	"Annakilli"	4 Students	Jassie Gift	Jassie Gift
2004	"Lajjavathiye" (English Version)	4 Students	Jassie Gift	Jassie Gift
2005	"Ketta Kodukkira Boomi"	Sandakozhi	Chinmayie, Ganga, Jassie Gift, Sujatha	Yuvan Shankar Raja
2005	"Istanbul Rajakumari"	Mazhai	Kalpana	Devi Sri Prasad
2005	"Andang Kaka"	Anniyan	KK, Shreya Ghoshal, Saindhavi	Harris Jayaraj
2005	"Gundu Manga Thoppukkulle"	Sachein	Jassie Gift, Malathi Laksman	Devi Sri Prasad
2006	"Freeya Vudu"	Aaru	Vadivelu, Grace Karunas	Devi Sri Prasad
2006	"Unna Petha Aatha"	Kedi	Jassie Gift, Suchitra	Yuvan Shankar Raja
2006	"Veyilodu Vilaiyadi"	Veyil	Kailash Kher, Jassie Gift, Tippu, Prasanna Ragavendar	G V Prakash Kumar
2006	"Kiliye Kiliye"	Something Something Unakum Yenakum	Jassie Gift, Devi Sri Prasad	Devi Sri Prasad
2007	"Sevvanam Selaikatti"	Mozhi	Jassie Gift	Vidyasagar
2008	"Ramana Porandhalum"	Sadhu Miranda	Jassie Gift, Vineetha	Deepak Dev
2008	"Are Are Shambo"	Alibhabha	Jassie Gift	Vidhyasagar
2008	"Kanchi Paanai"	Vellithirai	Chithra	G. V. Prakash Kumar
2009	"Kaatu Puli Adichi"	Peraanmai	Jassie Gift, Kay Kay	Vidhyasagar
2009	"Ishqbarara"	Pattalam		Jassie Gift
2009	"O Sexy Mama"	Yaavarum Nalam	Anuradha Sriram	Shankar-Ehsaan-Loy
2010	"Anbillama Karanchadhu"	Mandhira Punnagai	Jassie Gift	Vidhyasagar
2011	"Badham Pazham Pondra"	Ayudha Porattam	Jassie Gift, Madhumitha	Nandhan Raj
2012	"Annakkiliye"	Kai Thunindavan	Jassie Gift, Anitha Shaiq	Ishaan Dev
2014	"Kerala Poloru"	Kerala Nattilam Pengaludane	Jassie Gift, S. S. Kumaran, Kalyani Menon	S. S. Kumaran
2018	"Peela Peela"	Thaanaa Serndha Koottam	Nakash Aziz, Jassie Gift, Mali	Anirudh Ravichander
2018	"Karakudi Ilavarasi En Nenja"	Kalakalappu 2	Jassie Gift, Sudharshan Ashok	Hiphop Tamizha

==== Telugu songs ====
Year	Song	Album	Singers	Composer
2004	"Malleswarive"	Yuvasena	Ishaan Dev	Jassie Gift
2004	"Vonee Vesukunna"	Yuvasena	Jassie Gift, Smitha	Jassie Gift
2004	"Ye Dikkuna Nuvvunna"	Yuvasena	Jassie Gift	Jassie Gift
2004	"Tension Odhu Mama"	Aaru	Jassie Gift, Grace Karunas, M. L. R.	Devi Sri Prasad
2005	"Kodikoora Silugani"	Andarivadu	Jassie Gift, Malathy Lakshman	Devi Sri Prasad
2005	"Adire Adire"	Nuvvostanante Nenoddantana	Jassie Gift, Kalpana	Devi Sri Prasad
2005	"Kandi Chenukada"	Naa Alludu	Kandhi Chenu Kada	Devi Sri Prasad
2005	"Kondakaki"	Aparichithudu	Jassie Gift, K K, Sujatha Mohan	Harris Jayaraj
2005	"Gala Gala"	Chatrapathi	K. S. Chithra, Jassie Gift, Neerippal	M. M. Keeravani
2005	"Pathmavathi"	Adirindayya Chandram	Jassie Gift	M. M. Srilekha
2006	"Nuvvasalu Nachale"	Ashok	Jassie Gift, K. S. Chitra	Mani Sharma
2006	"Bulligownu"	Ranam	Jassie Gift	
2006	"Ammadi Alladi"	Vallabha	Jassie Gift	Yuvan Shankar Raja
2006	"Ossa Re"	Happy	Jassie Gift, Suchitra, Yuvan Shankar Raja (Rap vocals)	Yuvan Shankar Raja
2006	"College Papala"	Vikramarkudu	K.S.Chithra, Jassie Gift	M. M. Keeravani
2006	"Rabasa Rabasa"	Yuvakulu	Jassie Gift, Malathi	J.A Sundar
2006	Seema Chintakayalu	Yuvakulu	Jassie Gift, Vidya	J.A Sundar
2006	"Vasthava Vasthava"	Rakhi	Jassie Gift, M. M. Srilekha	Devi Sri Prasad
2007	"Korameenu"	Raju Bhai	Jassie Gift	Sundar C. Babu
2008	Pavu Takkuva Tommidi	Nachavule	Jassie Gift	Shekar Chandra
2009	"Anaganagaga"	Magadheera	Jassie Gift, Sunidhi Chauhan	M. M. Keeravani
2011	"Nath Nath Badrinath"	Badrinath	Jassie Gift, Sunidhi Chauhan	M. M. Keeravani
2012	"Osey Osey"	Julayi	Jassie Gift	Devi Sri Prasad
2014	"Nuvvante Naaku Chala Ishtame"	Heart Attack	Jassie Gift	Anup Rubens
2014	"Yerra Yerra Cheera"	Current Theega	Jassie Gift, Kamalaja	Achu
2019	"Falaknuma Mama"	Falaknuma Das	Jassie Gift	Vivek Sagar
2022	"Rama Rama"	Sehari	Jassie Gift	Prashanth R Vihari
2022	"Chiguraaku Chilakala"	Ninne Chusthu	Jassie Gift	Raman Rathod
2023	"What to Do"	Samajavaragamana	Jassie Gift	Gopi Sunder
2023	"Swaasa Meedha Dhyaasa"	Keedaa Cola	Jassie Gift	Vivek Sagar
2023	"Money Money"	Sound Party	Jassie Gift	Madeen
2025	"Soori Ori Soori "	Krishna Leela	Jassie Gift	Bheems Ceciroleo
2025	"Chaduvu Ledu "	Little Hearts	Jassie Gift	Sinjith Yerramilli
2025	"Andala Tarakasi"	Patang	Jassie Gift	Jose Jimmy
2026	"Blue Yellow"	Psych Siddhartha	Jassie Gift	Smaran Sai
2026	"Dhum Thakum"	Psych Siddhartha	Jassie Gift	Smaran Sai

== Filmography ==
Year	Title	Role
2004	Rain Rain Come Again	Jerry
2019	Oru Caribbean Udayippu	

== Controversy ==
In March 2024, while Gift and his band crew was performing on St. Peter's College, Kolenchery, the principal snatched mic and announced "there was technical error in the show". She later said, the band was allowed to perform only because it was promised Gift would be the only one singing while chorus was singing with him. Following this, Gift left the stage and the next day, the students of the college were protesting in front of principal's cabin.
