= Ashwaroodan =

- Directed by: Jayaraj
- Written by: Sajeev; Mahesh
- Produced by: D. Ramanaidu
- Starring: Suresh Gopi; Padmapriya; Sai Kumar
- Cinematography: Venugopalan
- Edited by: Vijay Kumar
- Music by: M. M. Sreelekha; Jassie Gift
- Production company: Suresh Productions
- Distributed by: Kalpaka Release
- Release date: 30 June 2006
- Country: India
- Language: Malayalam

Ashwaroodan (transl. Equestrian) is a 2006 Indian Malayalam-language action drama film directed by Jayaraj and produced by D. Ramanaidu under the company Suresh Productions. The film stars Suresh Gopi, Padmapriya and Sai Kumar. The background score is composed by M. M. Srilekha.

== Plot ==
Poomadathil Vishwanathan a compassionate landlord lives with his wife and son, Veerabhadran, and is accorded a status of being the main arbitrator in the village. He disposes cases presented before him in a first-come serve basis without differentiating between right and wrong. Vishwanathan is embroiled in a legal dispute regarding the possession of a vast area of land with his brothers in law, the Mangoyikkal Kurups. The court rules in favour of Vishwanathan. Vishwanathan's cunning advocate Kanaran join hands with the Kurups and advises them the steps to retrieve the Mala in exchange of half of the Mala.

The next day, Vishwanathan is tricked into meeting the Kurups to mediate a dispute. Vishwanathan is killed by Kanaran with an ivory tusk and it is manipulated as a death caused by an elephant. Veerabhadran takes over the reins of his family and village. In the present time, the Mala is under the possession of Kurups - falsified as a property transfer done by Vishwanathan before his death. Over the period of time, there are many inhabitants living in the Mala.

== Cast ==
- Suresh Gopi as Veerabhadran
- Sai Kumar as Manikoothu Marthandan
- Captain Raju as Vishwanathan
- T. G. Ravi as Kanaran Panicker
- Saiju Kurup as Divakaran
- Padmapriya as Seetha Lakshmi
- Jagannatha Varma as Vasu Kurup
- Spadikam George as Theepori Thampi
- Ranjith Velayudhan
- Kaladharan as Kurikkal
- Babu Annur as Krishnan Master
- M. B. Padmakumar as Raghavan

== Soundtrack ==
Ashwaroodan

Soundtrack album by Jassie Gift
- Released: 2006
- Recorded: 2006
- Genre: Feature film soundtrack
- Length: 17:39
- Language: Malayalam
- Label: Grihalakshmi Music
- Producer: Jassie Gift

Jassie Gift chronology
Balram vs Tharadas (2006)	Ashwaroodan (2006)	Hudugaata (2007)

The music for Ashwaroodan is composed by Jassie Gift.

No.	Title	Lyrics	Singer(s)	Length
1.	"Azhakaalila"	Inchakkad Balachandran	Jassie Gift, Akhila Anand	04:06
2.	"Meleyaayi Megham"	Vayalar Sarath Chandra Varma	Sachin Sankar, Rajalakshmi Abhiram	04:42
3.	"Anthivarum"	Vayalar Sarath Chandra Varma	Jassie Gift, Pushpavanam Kuppusamy, Jose Sagar, Delcy Ninan, G. J. Roshni, Anu Praveen	04:12
4.	"Meleyaayi Megham"	Vayalar Sarath Chandra Varma	Rajalakshmi Abhiram	04:39
Total length:				17:39
