= The Don (2006 film) =

- VCD cover
- Directed by: Shaji Kailas
- Written by: Rejaputhra Renjith (story); J. Pallassery (screenplay, dialogues)
- Produced by: S. Chandrakumar
- Starring: Dileep; Lal; Saikumar; Gopika
- Cinematography: Sanjeev Sankar
- Edited by: Don Max
- Music by: Songs; Mohan Sithara; Ishaan Dev (Theme song); Background Score; C. Rajamani
- Production company: Malavika Films
- Release date: September 5, 2006
- Country: India
- Language: Malayalam

The Don is a 2006 Indian Malayalam-language gangster film directed by Shaji Kailas, written by J. Pallassery. It stars an ensemble cast of Dileep, Lal, Saikumar and Gopika.

The Don was released on 5 September 2006. And bombed at the box office.

== Premise ==
Unnikrishnan becomes a trusted right hand to Kasim Baba after he saves him from a group of goons. However, when Kasim gets killed by his nephew, Sulaiman, Unni gets accused of the murder and is arrested. He decides to prove his innocence and avenge Kasim's death, by killing his murderers.

== Cast ==
- Dileep as Unnikrishnan (Salaam)
  - Harimurali as Young Unni
- Lal as Kasim Baba
- Saikumar as Advocate Subramaniam Swami
- Maniyanpilla Raju as MLA Abdullah Kutty
- Harisree Ashokan as Manikandan, Unni's friend
- Gopika as Shahida, Baba's daughter (Voiceover by Sreeja Ravi)
- Chitra Shenoy as Khadeeja, Baba's wife
- Bheeman Raghu as Sikandar Bhai
- Baburaj as Abutty
- Lalu Alex as Jail Superintendent Vishwanathan
- Kazan Khan as Sharon Bhai
- Spadikam George as DYSP Anirudan (Voiceover by Shobi Thilakan)
- Shammi Thilakan as Sulaiman, Baba's nephew
- Subair as Koya Sahib
- Sreejith Ravi as Vasu, Unni's friend
- Anil Murali as Joji, Unni's friend
- Augustine as Kabir Bhai
- Sukumari as Devakiamma,Unnikrishnan's mother

== Production ==
This film marks the first collaboration between Shaji Kailas and Dileep. Pooja was initially considered to be the heroine. However, the role went to Gopika.

== Soundtrack ==
The music was composed by Mohan Sithara and Ishaan Dev, with the latter composed the theme song.

- "Chandanatheril" - M. G. Sreekumar, Jyotsna Radhakrishnan (lyrics by Vayalar Sarathchandra Varma)
- "The Don (Theme)" - Ishaan Dev

== Release ==
The Don was scheduled to release before Onam but was pushed to the first week of September.

=== Critical response ===
Paresh C. Palicha of Rediff.com gave the film a rating of one out of five stars and wrote "The Don is simply a hotchpotch of many action-drama films, clumsily put together". A critic from Webindia123 wrote that "It may be better for Dileep to stop trying to become an action hero".

== Future ==
Dileep and Shaji Kailas were reported to collaborate again for another film produced by Dileep which did not materialise.
