= Rain Rain Come Again =

2004 Indian film

- Poster
- Directed by: Jayaraj
- Written by: Sharath Haridasan
- Produced by: Mahesh Raj
- Starring: Ajay Jose; Reji V. Nair; Divya Lakshmi; Asif Khan
- Cinematography: S. Gopinathu
- Edited by: Manohar
- Music by: Jassie Gift (songs); Pravin Mani (score)
- Production company: Neelambari Films
- Distributed by: Kalasangham Films; Kas & Right Release
- Release date: 8 August 2004
- Running time: 113 minutes
- Country: India
- Language: Malayalam

Rain, Rain .. Come Again is a 2004 Indian Malayalam-language satanic film directed by Jayaraj and written by Sharath Haridasan. Set in two rival colleges in Kerala, the plot follows a professor leading a hidden Satanic cult targeting students. The film features debutants Ajay Jose, Reji V. Nair, Divya Lakshmi, and Asif Khan. The songs were composed by Jassie Gift, while the background score was by Pravin Mani.

Rain, Rain .. Come Again was released in theatres on 8 August 2004. Although the film was bombed at box office, the songs "Themma Themma Themmadikkate" and "Nillu Nillu" were trendsetters among Kerala youth at that time.

== Plot ==
Dinesh, an orphan boy arrives in King Aloysius Men's college which maintains a longstanding rivalry with Queen Agnes Women's college. Agnes college tries to acquire NAAC accreditation, but Dinesh along with Aloysius college authorities spoil the plan. They also spoil the youth festival of their rivals. In retaliation, Agnes college under the leadership of Accent Sree defame the name of Aloysius college by trapping them in a scandal.

Meanwhile, under the leadership of a professor, Satanism slowly extends its influence in the college. The satanists including professor David Andrews, the leader, and Franko begin to lure students into the cult and those who refuse to convert at their usual gathering are killed.

Meanwhile, Marakashnam Franco, who was Daisy's boyfriend befriends Sree, which causes a split between Dinesh and Accent Sree. John finds out about the professor and Franko's deal from Marco Polo, his classmate. Marco Polo reveals his findings to a police officer, who surprisingly is an ally of the Satanists. Marco gets brutally killed by Franko.

Sree is lured into the cult by Franco after the split with Dinesh. Dinesh, enraged over the death of his friend, seeks revenge and goes after the cult members to rescue Sree. In a fight that follows, Prof. David Andrews is subdued and chased to a mountain cliff. And jumps off the cliff to his death. In the end, the students reunite and celebrate in the college.

== Cast ==
- Ajay Jose as Dinesh
- Divya Lakshmi as Sree
- Renjith Velayudhan as Prof. David Andrews
- Aashish Khan as Franco
- Sarath Haridasan as Marco Polo
- Jassie Gift as Jerry
- Kaladharan as Father Kunjukutty
- Prasanth Punnapra as Rajappan
- Thara Thomas as Daisy
- Valiyashala Sukumaran as Men's hostel warden
- Chandrika Das as Lady Gaga
- Archana Susheelan as College student
- Rasana as College student
- Iniya as College student
- Vinod Kedamangalam as Bus employee
- Unni Shivapal as M. P.

== Soundtrack ==
Rain Rain Come Again

Soundtrack album by Jassie Gift
- Released: 5 June 2004
- Recorded: 2003
- Genre: Feature film soundtrack
- Length: 37:02
- Label: Sony Music Entertainment India Pvt. Ltd. / Johny Sagariga

Jassie Gift chronology
4 The People (2004)	Rain Rain Come Again (2004)	December (2005)

The film features songs composed by Jassie Gift and distributed by Sony Music Entertainment India Pvt. Ltd. / Johny Sagariga. The background score was done by Pravin Mani. The song "Themma Themma Themmaadikkaatte" was later reused as "Pada Pada Kannada" in the film Shyloo (2011).

Rain Rain Come Again
No.	Title	Lyrics	Singer(s)	Length
1.	"Themma Themma Themmadikkatte - Version, 1"	Thara Thomas	Jassie Gift, Jyotsna, Karthika	4:34
2.	"Kannaampothimele"	Kaithapram Damodaran Namboothiri, Thara Thomas	Jassie Gift, Thara Thomas	5:40
3.	"Nillu Nillu"	Kaithapram Damodaran Namboothiri	Jassie Gift	4:25
4.	"Mazhamazhayaai"	Kaithapram Damodaran Namboothiri	Jassie Gift	4:52
5.	"Krishna"	Thara Thomas	Jassie Gift, Thara Thomas	4:50
6.	"Poovinnullil Poomazha"	Kaithapram Damodaran Namboothiri	Jassie Gift	4:31
7.	"Themma Themma Themmadikkatte - Version, 2"	Thara Thomas	Jassie Gift, Karthika	4:22
8.	"Kiss Of Death"	Thara Thomas, Boban Abraham	Jassie Gift	3:44

== Release ==
The film was originally scheduled to release on 6 August 2004, but the Thiruvananthapuram Regional Censor Board refused to certify the film citing "excessive violence" and had referred the film to the revising committee. Sify reported that distributors and exhibitors are shocked because "Jayaraj's earlier film 4 The People had more violence and close-up's of hands and legs being chopped off which was passed by the same censors".

== Reception ==
A critic from Sify wrote that "it's hard to find one redeeming factor in this utterly lame brain, stupid film [...] the lead cast of newcomers are all a major let down and technically the film is a big disappointment. All the seven songs in the album sound similar and the picturisation is low brow".

The film underperformed at the box office. However, the songs "Themma Themma Themmadikkatte" and "Nillu Nillu" were trendsetters among Kerala youth at that time.

== In popular culture ==
In 2018, the song "Nillu Nillu" (meaning: stop, stop) became viral in the social media application TikTok, with users posting videos of them stopping moving vehicles for dancing in front of it with the song playing in the background. It called the attention of Kerala Police who condemned the act for public nuisance and blocking vehicles on the road.

In the late 2022, the song "Themmadikkatte" became viral in social media with the users posting dancing videos to it. The song was featured in the Tamil film Dragon (2025).
