= Narain (actor) =

Indian actor

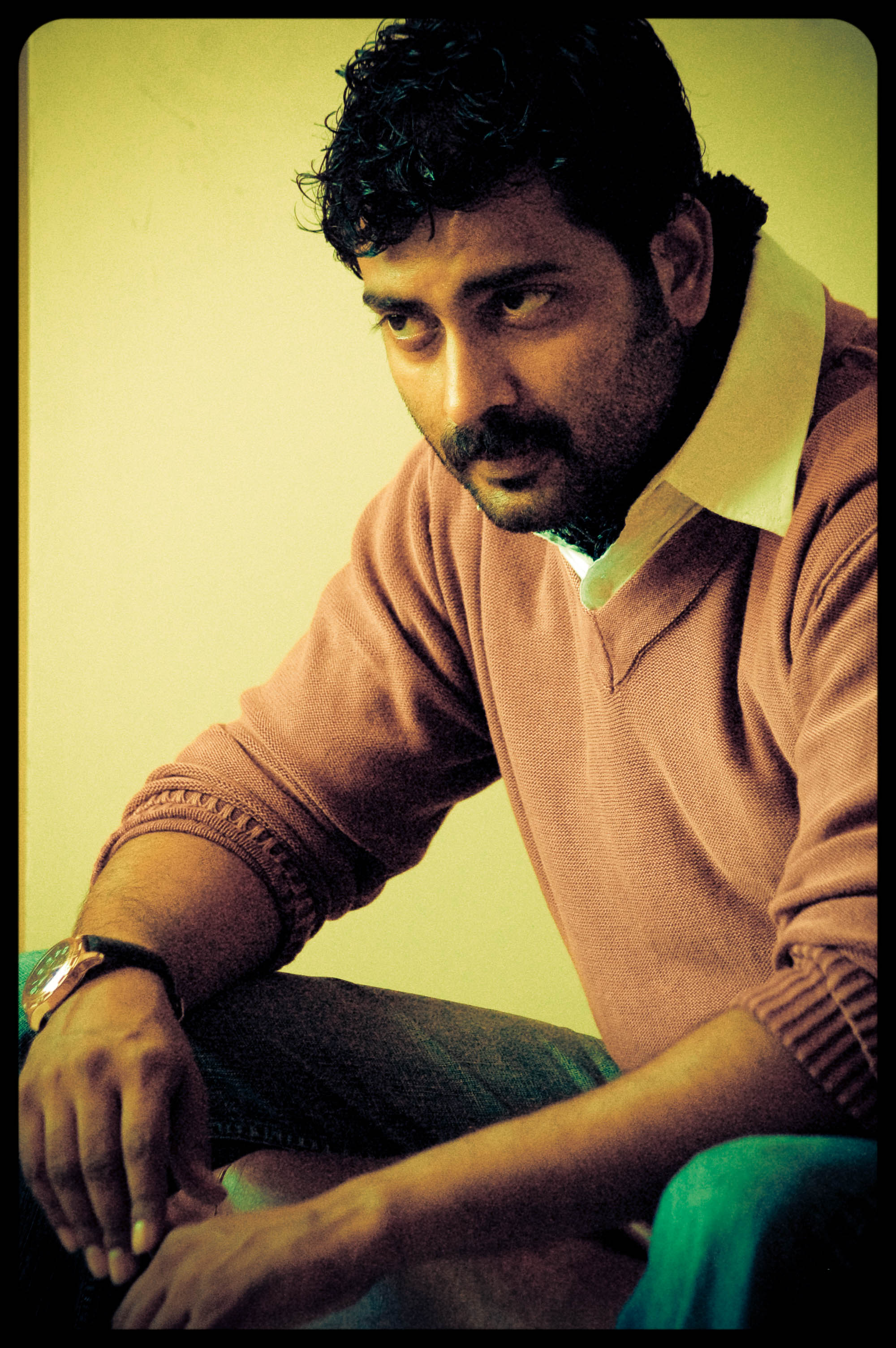
- Narain in 2015
- Born: Sunil Kumar
- Education: St. Thomas College, Thrissur, Sree Kerala Varma College, Thrissur
- Occupation: Actor
- Years active: 2002–present
- Spouse: Manju Haridas (m. 2007)
- Children: 2
- Parents: Ramakrishnan Nair; Shantha Kumari

Sunil Kumar, known by his stage name Narain, is an Indian actor, who works in Malayalam, Tamil and Telugu films. He debuted as an actor in Adoor Gopalakrishnan's Nizhalkuthu (2002), followed by the Malayalam films 4 the People (2004), Achuvinte Amma (2005), and Classmates (2006). Narain's Tamil and Telugu debuts were in Mysskin's Chithiram Pesuthadi (2006) and Jayaraj's Yuvasena (2004).

== Career ==
Narain's first film was Nizhalkuthu. His first commercial film, 4 The People, was dubbed in Tamil and Telugu. He portrayed a struggling lawyer, Emmanuel John, in Achuvinte Amma and also played a doctor, Jeevan, in Sheelabathi. He also played roles in Annorikal and Classmates. His debut Tamil movie was Chithiram Pesuthadi, alongside Malayalam actress Bhavana, who too made her Tamil debut through this film. Through Panthaya Kozhi, produced by director Lal, he has been re-launched as an independent action hero in the Malayalam film industry. In 2008, he did another youth-oriented Malayalam movie Minnaminnikoottam. He has acted in more than 20 Malayalam movies.

Narain worked with director Sathyan Anthikkad in the 2005 movie Achuvinte Amma and again in 2009 in Bhagyadevatha.

Narain played the lead role in P. T. Kunju Muhammed's Veeraputhran (2011). He collaborated with director Mysskin on the 2008 film Anjaathe and the 2012 superhero film Mugamoodi where he portrayed a villain. However his career high came through the 2019, Lokesh Kanagaraj directed venture Kaithi (2019), co starring with Karthi. In 2022, Vikram who bridges two films occurring in the same universe starring Kamal Haasan, Vijay Sethupathi, and Fahadh Faasil.

== Early and personal life ==
Narain completed his pre-degree from St. Thomas College, Thrissur and graduated from Sree Kerala Varma College. He did his diploma in cinematography at the MGR Government Film And Television Institute. He joined cinematographer Rajiv Menon and later resigned to try for chances in acting. On 26 August 2007, he married Malayalam television host Manju Haridas. Manju had hosted shows like Superstar Junior and sang in Chithiram Pesuthadi, a Tamil film in which Narain acted. The couple has two children, a daughter born in 2008 and a son born in 2022.

== Filmography ==
Key
†	Denotes films that have not yet been released

Year	Title	Role	Language	Notes
2002	Nizhalkuthu	Muthu	Malayalam	Credited as Sunil Kumar
2004	4 the People	Rajan Mathew IPS	Malayalam	Credited as Sunil Kumar
2004	Yuvasena	Sharat Chandra	Telugu	Credited as Suresh Menon
2005	Achuvinte Amma	Adv. Emmanuel John	Malayalam	Credited as Sunil Kumar
2005	Annorikal	Benny	Malayalam	Credited as Sunil Kumar
2005	By the People	Rajan Mathew IPS	Malayalam	Credited as Sunil Kumar
2005	Sheelabathi	Dr. Jeevan	Malayalam	Credited as Sunil Kumar
2006	Chithiram Pesuthadi	Thiru	Tamil	
2006	Classmates	Murali	Malayalam	
2006	Nenjirukkum Varai	Ganesan	Tamil	
2007	Panthaya Kozhi	Nandagopal	Malayalam	
2007	Pallikoodam	Vetrivel IAS	Tamil	
2008	Anjathe	SI Sathyavan	Tamil	Nominated — Filmfare Award for Best Actor – Tamil
2008	Ore Kadal	Jayakumar	Malayalam	
2008	Minnaminnikoottam	Abhilash	Malayalam	
2009	Bhagyadevatha	Sajan Joseph	Malayalam	
2009	Robin Hood	CID Alexander Felix	Malayalam	
2011	Thambikottai	Azhagiri Shanmugam	Tamil	
2011	Ko	Himself	Tamil	Special appearance
2011	Veeraputhran	Mohammed Abdul Rahiman	Malayalam	
2012	Grandmaster	Kishore IPS	Malayalam	
2012	Mugamoodi	Anguchamy / Dragon	Tamil	Nominated — SIIMA Award for Best Actor in a Negative Role; Nominated — Vijay Award for Best Villain
2012	Ayalum Njanum Thammil	Dr. Vivek	Malayalam	
2012	The Hitlist	Dr. Lewis	Malayalam	Cameo appearance
2013	Proprietors: Kammath & Kammath	IRS officer Suresh	Malayalam	Cameo appearance
2013	3 Dots	Dr. Isaac Samuel	Malayalam	
2013	Aaru Sundarimaarude Katha	Sreekumar	Malayalam	
2013	Red Rain	Jay	Malayalam	
2014	Njangalude Veettile Athidhikal	Raj Menon	Malayalam	
2015	Kaththukkutti	Arivazhagan	Tamil	
2016	Hallelooya	Dr. Roy	Malayalam	
2016	Angane Thanne Nethave Anchettennam Pinnale	Karthika Perumal	Malayalam	
2016	Kavi Uddheshichathu..?	Vattathil Bosco	Malayalam	
2017	Rum	Inspector Praveen Thomas	Tamil	
2017	Adam Joan	Cyriac	Malayalam	
2018	Police Junior	Sai Ram	Malayalam	
2018	U Turn	Ritesh	Tamil; Telugu	Bilingual film
2018	Odiyan	Prakashan	Malayalam	
2019	Pengalila	Vinod	Malayalam	
2019	Madhura Raja	SI Balachandran	Malayalam	Cameo appearance
2019	Marconi Mathai	CI Eesho Tharakan	Malayalam	
2019	Kaithi	Inspector Bejoy	Tamil	
2019	Champion	Santha	Tamil	
2022	Vikram	Inspector Bejoy	Tamil	
2022	Ente Mazha	Unknown	Malayalam	
2022	Yugi	Nandakumar	Tamil	Bilingual film
2022	Adrishyam	Nandakumar	Malayalam	Bilingual film
2023	2018	Winston	Malayalam	
2023	Gandeevadhari Arjuna	Ajit Chandra	Telugu	
2023	800	Master	Tamil	
2023	Iraivan	ACP Andrew	Tamil	
2023	Queen Elizabeth	Alex	Malayalam	
2024	Devara: Part 1	Irfan	Telugu	
2024	Manorathangal	Prabhakaran	Malayalam	Anthology series; segment: Kazhcha
2025	Eko	Navykkaran	Malayalam	
2025	Pharma	Dr. Vijay	Malayalam	JioHotstar series
2025	Aghosham	Sooraj Samuel	Malayalam	
2026	Jana Nayagan	Khaleel	Tamil	
TBA	Kural †	TBA	Tamil	Delayed
TBA	Nodikku Nodi †	TBA	Tamil	Delayed

== Awards and nominations ==
Year	Award	Category	Film	Result
2007	Filmfare Awards South	Best Supporting Actor	Classmates	Nominated
2010	Fimfare Awards South	Best Supporting Actor	Robin Hood	Nominated
2012	Vijay Awards	Best Villain	Mugamoodi	Nominated
2021	South Indian International Movie Awards	Best Supporting Actor	Kaithi	Nominated
