= Munjane =

- Directed by: S. Narayan
- Written by: S. Narayan
- Produced by: Bhagyavathi; S. Narayan
- Starring: Ganesh; Manjari Phadnis
- Cinematography: Jagadish Wali
- Music by: Dharma Vish
- Release date: 2 March 2012
- Country: India
- Language: Kannada

Munjane ( transl. Dawn) is a 2012 Indian Kannada-language romantic drama film starring Ganesh and Manjari Phadnis. The film was written, produced and directed by S. Narayan, who also composed and written the songs and also acted in the film. Dharma Vish has scored the background music. Narayan's wife, Bhagyavathi Narayan has produced the venture under his home banner. Jagadish Wali is the cinematographer. The film opened across Karnataka cinema halls on 2 March 2012.

== Plot ==
Manu and Pavithra, without having met, become fond of each other by exchanging notes on a bus travelling to each other's city. Later, Pavithra gets married off to a rich man, unaware that he is Manu.

== Cast ==
- Ganesh as Manumurthy alias Manu
- Manjari Phadnis as Pavithra
- Malavika Avinash
- S. Narayan
- Raghavendra Joshi
- Rajendra Karanth
- M. N. Lakshmi Devi
- BV Bhaskar

== Soundtrack ==
Munjane

Soundtrack album by S Narayan
- Released: 2012
- Recorded: 2012
- Genre: Feature film soundtrack
- Length: 28:11
- Language: Kannada

Official audio
- Munjane - Full Album on YouTube

Director S. Narayan himself has composed 6 songs. All songs have been arranged and produced by Dharma Vish. The background music has been scored by Dharma Vish.

Track listing
No.	Title	Singer(s)	Length
1.	"Nalle Nalle""	Vijay Prakash, Anuradha Bhat	4:32
2.	"Hey Hoove"	Ravindra Soragavi, Shreya Ghoshal	5:40
3.	"Yaaro Obba Sundari"	Ishaan Dev	4:39
4.	"Naavu Hingene"	Jassie Gift, Oscar	4:20
5.	"Anthoo Inthoo"	Shaan, Shweta Pandit, Sakthisree Gopalan	4:40
6.	"Hey Manase"	Akash Talapatra, Shreya Ghoshal	5:40
Total length:			28:11

== Reception ==
=== Critical response ===
A critic from The Times of India scored the film at 3.5 out of 5 stars and says "Full marks to Ganesh who takes the story from the beginning to end with his marvellous performance, especially in the climax. Manjari impresses with her expressions. Rajendra Karanth and Malavika are gracious. Music by S Narayan and camera by JS Wali pass muster". Srikanth Srinivasa from Rediff.com scored the film at 3 out of 5 stars and wrote "Narayan has composed a few good songs including the Manase number. Waali's cinematography goes well with the pace of the movie. Munjaane is definitely a treat to watch". A critic from News18 India wrote "On the whole, it looks like Ganesh's performance is the only saving grace of 'Munjaane'. Otherwise it is another average fare". A critic from DNA wrote "Circumstances compel them to marry but they decide to live separately. Will they join hands to lead a happy married life? See it on the silver screen. The film is not so bad if you can sit through the first half, which tends to get a bit dragging at parts". A critic from Bangalore Mirror wrote "The casting is good barring Malavika who is too young to be Ganesh’s mother and Manjari’s mother-in-law. Overall, the film is avoidable and you can only rue what it could have been".

== Awards ==
Ceremony	Category	Nominee	Result
2nd South Indian International Movie Awards	Best Female Debutant	Manjari Phadnis	Nominated
2nd South Indian International Movie Awards	Best Supporting Actress	Malavika Avinash	Nominated
