= 4 the People =

2004 Indian film

- DVD Cover
- Directed by: Jayaraj
- Screenplay by: Iqbal Kuttippuram
- Story by: Jayaraj
- Produced by: Sabu Cherian
- Starring: Narain; Arun Cherukavil; Bharath; Arjun Bose; Padma Kumar
- Cinematography: R. D. Rajasekhar
- Edited by: Anthony
- Music by: Jassie Gift
- Distributed by: Johny Sagariga Film Company
- Release date: 19 February 2004
- Running time: 136 minutes
- Country: India
- Language: Malayalam
- Budget: ₹40 lakh
- Box office: ₹3 crore

4 the People is a 2004 Indian Malayalam-language vigilante action thriller film directed by Jayaraj and written by Iqbal Kuttippuram from a story by Jayaraj. The film stars Narain, Arun Cherukavil, Bharath (in his Malayalam debut), Arjun Bose, Padma Kumar, Gopika and Pranathi in the lead roles, with Babu Annur in a supporting role. The plot follows four engineering students who lead a double life as members of a vigilante group called "4 the People," targeting corrupt public officials.

The film's soundtrack became a trendsetter in Malayalam cinema, pioneering a new style of composition. 4 the People was both a critical and commercial success, achieving cult status. It was partially re-shot and released in Tamil as 4 Students and was later remade in Telugu as Yuvasena (2004), with Jayaraj directing and Bharath reprising his role. The film spawned two sequels, By the People (2005) and Of the People (2008).

== Plot ==
Aravind (Arun), Vivek (Bharath), Eshwar (Arjun Bose) and Shafeek (Padma Kumar) are four engineering students from economically struggling families that were victims of society's corruption in one way or the other. Enraged by various injustices happening around them, the group take the law into their own hands and form the secretive clique called 4 The People that targets corrupt officials. They create an identity for themselves with their attire and mode of operation. They dress up in all black and ride bullet motorcycles. They even set up a website for the public to lodge their complaints.

From the complaints lodged they chose an official and cut their dominant arm to send a message to other officials and expose them in media with relevant evidences that they collect before attacking a target. The group gains a lot of public support and are regarded as heroes. Their actions also lead to government officials refusing to take bribes in fear of someone lodging a complaint against them to 4 The People. Soon, the police are on their track. A young cop Rajan Mathew (Narain) is in hot pursuit of the gang who are now targeting a corrupt minister.

The four attempt to kill the minister, but fail. Seeing the brutality of the police, the students come to the support of the foursome. One of the students kills the minister and is joined by three more students. It is concurrently revealed that these four students were benefited from 4 The People's influence in the society. They escape with the help of other students who were present there and forms another vigilante group- a gang of four.

== Cast ==
- Narain as City Police Commissioner Rajan Mathew IPS
- Arun Cherukavil as Aravind Sebastian
- Bharath as Vivek
- Arjun Bose as Eeswar Iyer
- Padma Kumar as Shafeek
- Gopika as Divya Anand
- Pranathi as Teena
- Babu Annur as MP Mahadevan
- Samad Sulaiman
- Adhitya (Jai) as Rajath Kumar
- Chandra Banu as Suanathan A.C.P.
- Ani as Sidharthan G.I.
- Antony Mathew as Alexander Punnoose D.I.G.
- Unni Shivapal as MP's Son

== Soundtrack ==
4 the People

Soundtrack album by Jassie Gift
- Released: 27 January 2004
- Recorded: 2003
- Studios: Pooja Sound, Ernakulam
- Genre: Film soundtrack
- Labels: Johny Sagariga; T-Series

Jassie Gift chronology
The King Maker Leader (2003)	4 the People (2004)	Ennittum (2004)

Soundtrack was composed by Jassie Gift and Written by Kaithapram Damodaran Namboothiri. The songs "Lajjavathiye" and "Annakkili" became popular. Jassie Gift later reused "Lajjavathiye" as "Mandakiniye" for Kannada film Hudugaata. In these songs, Jassie Gift utilised and popularised Rap and Hip-hop in Kerala.

=== Malayalam ===
#	Song	Artist(s)
1	"Lajjavathiye"	Jassie Gift
2	"Ninte Mizhimuna"	Jassie Gift, Jyotsna, Chorus
3	"Lokasamastha"	Deepankuran, Jassie Gift
4	"Annakkili"	Prathap Chandran, Chorus
5	"For the People"	Farhad, Rama Varma, Chorus
6	"Lajjavathiye" (Western)	Jassie Gift
7	"Annakkili"	Jassie Gift, Chorus

=== 4 Students (Tamil version) ===
#	Song	Artist(s)
1	"Lajjavathiye"	Jassie Gift
2	"Annakkili"	Jassie Gift
3	"Undhan Vizhimudhal"	Jassie Gift, Ganga Sitharasu
4	"Poovaale Indha"	Harish Raghavendra
5	"For the People"	Unni Menon
6	"Annakkili (V2)"	Prasanna

== Release ==
The satellite rights of the film's Tamil version were sold to Star Vijay.

Sify wrote that "Jayaraj's 4 The People is a trendsetter and a welcome change in the placid superstar driven Malayalam film industry". Nowrunning said that "Though the storyline is wafer-thin, the narration is fast-paced and the film is technically brilliant".

=== Box office ===
It became one among the highest-grossing Malayalam films of the year, grossing ₹3 crore against a budget of ₹40 lakh.

== Sequels ==
The film was followed by two sequels, By the people in 2005 and Of the People in 2008
