= Naughty Professor =

- Directed by: Hari Narayanan
- Written by: Baburaj
- Produced by: Arun Jose; Sreekanth Pillai
- Starring: Baburaj; Lakshmi Gopalaswamy; Innocent; Lena; Tini Tom
- Cinematography: Sajith Menon
- Edited by: Bijith Bala
- Music by: Jassie Gift
- Production company: Anna Amala Films
- Distributed by: Kalasangham Films; Kas Release
- Release date: 5 July 2012
- Country: India
- Language: Malayalam

Naughty Professor is a 2012 Malayalam adult sex comedy film written by Baburaj and directed by Hari Narayanan. It stars Baburaj and Lakshmi Gopalaswamy in the lead roles along with Innocent, Lena, Tini Tom, Janardhanan, Sandhya and Malavika Nair who form the rest of the star cast.

== Plot ==
Professor Viswambaran works at Viswa Jyothi Engineering College, Thodupuzha. Over-consciousness about his beauty and glamour gives him a "naughty professor" image in the college. His wife Karthika, a former actress, had decided to discontinue her acting career to settle down with her husband. Viswambaran often feels overshadowed by his wife's fame and name. It is during this time Viswambharan's old nemesis Chacko a.k.a. David and his wife Tessa come as their neighbours. The twist and turns in Viswambharan's married life that follow form the crux of the story.

== Cast ==
- Baburaj as Prof. Viswambaran
- Lakshmi Gopalaswamy as Karthika / Viswambaran's wife
- Innocent as Mulavarikkal Francis
- Tini Tom as Chacko
- Lena as Tessa, Chacko's wife
- Janardhanan
- Suresh Krishna
- Malavika Nair
- Dharmajan
- Praveen Prem
- Shine Tom Chacko
- Bheeman Raghu as Priest
- Krishna Prabha
- Mythili (cameo)
- Shafna (cameo)
- Vishnupriya (cameo)

== Music ==
1. "Jig Jinga" - Jyotsna, Shami Samad
2. "Thalam Thiruthalam" - Manjari, Jassie Gift
