= Akhila Anand =

Indian playback singer

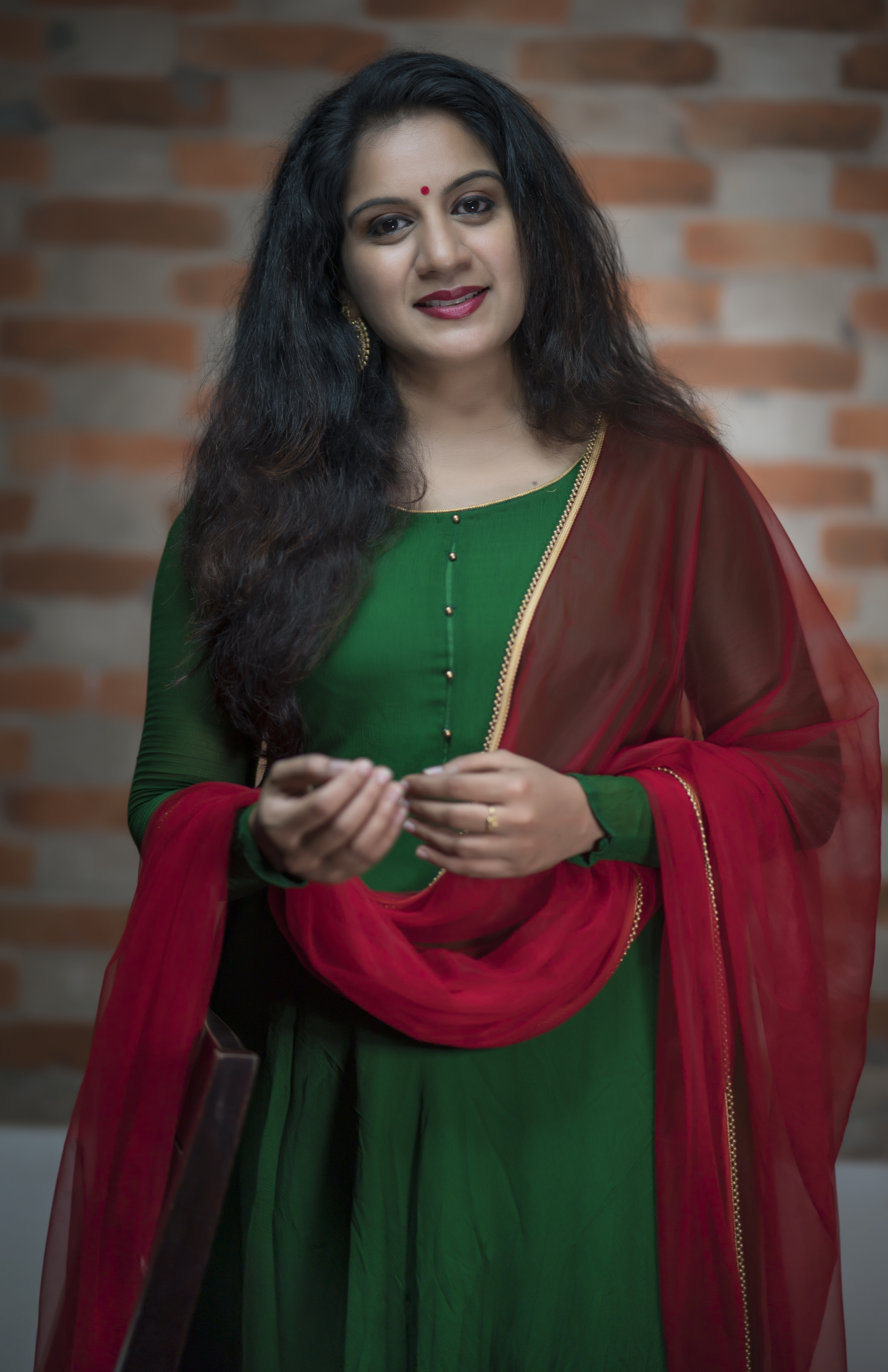
- Akhila in 2020
- Born: 13 October 1982 (age 43); Thiruvananthapuram, Kerala, India
- Occupation: Singer
- Years active: 2006–present
- Spouse: Shyam Sai (m. 2004)
- Children: 1

Akhila Anand, also known as Akhila Shyam Sai, is an Indian playback singer who works in the Malayalam film industry. She is also a stage performer, television artiste and host in Kerala.

== Early life ==
Akhila Anand was born in Trivandrum City, India in Oct 1982. She started school at Poojapura Govt Lower Primary School, did her primary and secondary education at Sisu Vihar and Cotton Hill Girls High School. Post school she did pre degree course in NSS College and graduated in Commerce from Tandem. Her musical sojourn was set on track by Saraswathi Ammal, under whom she trained in Carnatic Music for five years. She was later given advanced musical classes by Dr Bhagya Lakshmi, She also had the opportunity to be trained by noted singer Ramesh Narayan and Perumbavoor G Raveendranath.

== Career ==
Akhila Anand's musical career started with her song 'Azhakarnilla Manjacharaadillay Poothali', a duet in the movie Ashwaroodan, directed by Jayaraj. The music was composed by Jassie Gift. She has hence rendered more than forty songs for various Malayalam Films. One of the other hits that is noted is the song Kalkkanda Malayil in the movie chocolate composed by Alex Paul and penned by Vayalar Sarath Chandra Varma. Akhila is also active in the television circuit. She has been involved in various TV shows like Climax on Kairali TV aired in 2000. In 2002 she anchored Global Greetings followed by Chithra Jalakam and Hridayaragam, all on Asianet. Her recent TV programs include Symphony in Kairali TV and Suvarna Geethangal in Surya TV. She is also a stage artiste and has done many shows during the Onam Week Celebrations in Kerala along with many other programs. She is active in anchoring shows in and out of Kerala. She continues to sing playback for Malayalam Movies. Akhila was one of the 12 jury members of Sa Re Ga Ma Pa Keralam Li'l Champs, the 2021 music based competition program on Zee Keralam Channel.

== Discography ==
Year	Song	Film	Lyricist(s)	Composer(s)
2006	"Azhakaalila"	Ashwaroodan	Inchakkad Balachandran	Jassie Gift
2006	"Vaayaadikkaatte Pokaamo"	Boss I Love You	Rajeev Alunkal	Hari Anand
2007	"Kodipaarum Pooramalle"	Happy Be Happy	Siju Thuravoor	Yuvan Shankar Raja
2007	"Bhajan"	Hallo	Vayalar Sarathchandra Varma	Alex Paul
2007	"Vaa Vaa"	Bunny, The Lion	Siju Thuravoor	Devi Sri Prasad
2007	"Kalkkanda Malaye"	Chocolate	Vayalar Sarathchandra Varma	Alex Paul
2008	"Vegam Paayumee"	American Halwa	Siju Thuravoor	Mahesh Shankar
2009	"Sundariye"	Drona	Mankombu Gopalakrishnan	Anoop Rubens
2010	"Ente Chithira Thaamara"	Four Friends	Kaithapram	M Jayachandran
2010	"Doore Maamala Mele"	Fiddle	S. Jayan	Ramesh Sasi
2011	"Manjin Thullikal"	Dheera	Sudhamsu	MM Keeravani
2011	"Kannum Kannum"	100% Love	Siju Thuravoor	Devi Sri Prasad
2012	"Aadaadum"	Kunjaliyan	Beeyar Prasad	MG Sreekumar
2012	"Anuraagini"	Loomier Brothers	Sreemangalam Sreekumar	Ratheesh Krishna
2013	"Bhoomippenne"	Progress Report	Cheramangalam	G. K. Harish Mani
2013	"Muthumani Theril"	Dear Friends	Chunakkara Ramankutty	L. J. Benson
2013	"Kannante Karalile"	Ithu Manthramo Thanthramo Kuthanthramo	Sainu Pallithazhathu	Anil Gopalan
2013	"Kannin Aayiram"	Aaru Sundarimaarude Katha	Kaithapram	Deepak Dev
2014	"Jeevithamenna Koodu"	Snehamulloraal Koodeyullappol	Vayalar Sarathchandra Varma	Sajeev Mangalath
2015	"Karinkallikkuyile"	She Taxi	Shibu Chakravarthy	Bijibal
2015	"Chandanakkaattile Maine"	Hridyam	M. T. Jayachandran Nair	Rajeev Ramesh
2015	"Melle Pookkum"	Aashamsakalode Anna	Rajiv Alunkal	Parthasarathy
2018	"Kannum Kannum"	Vikadakumaran	B. K. Harinarayanan	Rahul Raj
2018	"Snehappoompaadathe"	Ningal Camera Nireekshanathilaanu	G. Vinunath	Arunraj
2018	"Karineela Kannulla Pennu"	Joseph	B. K. Harinarayanan	Ranjin Raj

=== Singles and EPs ===
Year	Title	Notes	Source
2024	Thaamara Pennu	Released as a standalone single	Apple Music
2024	Aattukal Pooram	Devotional single	Apple Music
2024	Katharamizhiyinakal Idayum	Folk/romantic single	Apple Music
2025	Karivala Chinniya Poleyoraal	Newest release	Apple Music
