= Shyloo =

- Directed by: S. Narayan
- Written by: S. Narayan
- Story by: Prabhu Solomon
- Based on: Mynaa (2010)
- Produced by: K. Manju
- Starring: Ganesh; Bhama
- Cinematography: Jagadesh Waali
- Edited by: K. R. Lingaraj
- Music by: Jassie Gift
- Production company: K. Manju Cinemas
- Distributed by: Jayanna Films
- Release date: 10 December 2011
- Running time: 152 minutes
- Country: India
- Language: Kannada
- Box office: ₹2 crores

Shyloo (Kannada: ಶೈಲೂ) is a 2011 Indian Kannada-language romantic drama film written and directed by S. Narayan. It is a remake of the 2010 Tamil film Mynaa which itself was reported to have been inspired by the 2006 Hong Kong film Dog Bite Dog. The film stars Ganesh and Bhama. Jassie Gift was the music director of the film.

== Plot ==
The film starts with an imprisoned Manja (Ganesh) recalling his love for Shyloo (Bhama) since childhood that becomes more intense as they grow. Though Shyloo's mother assures Manja of getting them married, she changes her mind and arranges for Shyloo to marry a rich family boy. Infuriated, Manja threatens to kill her. He is arrested by the police and given a 30-days prison sentence. Shyloo's mother arranges the marriage a day before his release and Manja escapes from prison. As the police officer Bhaskar and a constable Ramaiah handcuff Manja, Shyloo too goes along with him as they decide to get married after he is released from prison.

On their way, they encounter adventures that include an elephant chasing them and losing their way, thereby reaching Kerala. From there, their journey continues, with Bhaskar becoming infuriated with Manja as he is not able to celebrate his "Deepavali" with his family, busy running behind Manja. A parallel story reveals Bhaskar's annoyed wife Sudha and her brothers troubling Bhaskar to come to their hometown to celebrate Deepavali. However, Bhaskar soon develops a soft corner for Manja as he saves him from a freak bus accident. The four go back together to their hometown. Bhaskar promises to get Manja released within two days and assures to get them married after Manja is released. Ramaiah asks Shyloo to stay in his house for shelter.

However, Bhaskar asks Ramaiah to let Shyloo stay in his house so that he can keep her safe for the next day's wedding. On reaching his house, Bhaskar finds Sudha waiting furiously, and she also accuses Shyloo for having an illegitimate relationship with Bhaskar. Bhaskar gets angry and scolds his wife, following which she leaves the home. On the next day, Bhaskar, Ramaiah, and Manja on the way to court, find a dead body on the railway track and get shocked, seeing it to be Shyloo. Bhaskar finds out that Sudha's brothers arrived at their house immediately and beat Shyloo to death, whom they thought to be responsible for the trouble. They then threw her body on a railway track. Upon witnessing this, Manja cries, jumps in front of another train, and dies. Bhaskar feels guilty about the incident and gets angered. He quits his job and goes back to his wife's home, where he kills her and her brothers with a sickle. He voluntarily surrenders and is imprisoned for a 20 year-sentence in Manja's cell.

== Cast ==
- Ganesh as Manja
- Bhama as Shyloo
- Praveen
- Suchendra Prasad
- Rangayana Raghu
- Ila Vitla
- Pipeline Ramesh
- Honnavalli Krishna
- Renuka Prasad
- Chandrashekhar Bandiyappa
- Jolly Bastin
- Pankaj Narayan
- Jaishree Raj
- Suresh Chandra
- Yathiraj
- Gajendra Rao

== Soundtrack ==
The tune of the track "Pada Pada Kannada" was reused by Gift from his own compositional Malayalam song "Themma Themma Themmadikatte", from the 2004 Malayalam film Rain Rain Come Again.

No.	Title	Lyrics	Singer(s)	Length
1.	"Pada Pada Kannada"	S. Narayan	Puneeth Rajkumar
2.	"O Jeevave (Duet Version)"	Kaviraj	Shaan, Shreya Ghoshal
3.	"Shyloo"	Kaviraj	Ishaan Dev
4.	"Ee Manasinalli"	V. Nagendra Prasad	Jassie Gift, Chaitra H. G.
5.	"Bandiddu Barali"	Kaviraj	Vijay Prakash
6.	"O Jeevave (Female Version)"	Kaviraj	Shreya Ghoshal

== Reception ==
=== Critical response ===
The film received positive reviews especially for performance of lead actors.

Shruti Indira Lakshminarayana from Rediff.com scored the film at 3 out of 5 stars and says "There nothing new about the music. A special appearance by Narayan's son and actor Pankaj in a song rendered by actor Puneet Rajkumar also fails to impress. If you're planning to watch Shyloo, make sure you have a heart that can withstand both love and its losses!". A critic from Bangalore Mirror wrote " the sterling performances of the four main characters, Ganesh, Bhama, Rangayana Raghu and Suchendra Prasad.S Narayan has proved to be a remake master once again. This is a mass film where the USP is emotional quotient. It deserves a watch". A critic from News18 India wrote "Munar has been well captured by Jagadish Waali. The title song is catchy and well-picturised.'Shyloo' is a well performed film with some touching sequences, but it is not as good as the original 'Mynaa'". A critic from The Times of India scored the film at 3.5 out of 5 stars and says "While Ganesh is amazing as a village loverboy, Bhama is simply superb. Rangayana Raghu lights up the dull moments. Suchendra Prasad impresses. Music by Jassie Gift and camera by J S Wali add value to the story".

== Home media ==
The movie was released on DVD with 5.1 channel surround sound and English subtitles and VCD.
