= Hudugaata =

2007 film

- Theatrical release poster
- Directed by: Sanjay. K
- Screenplay by: Sanjay. K
- Produced by: B.G. Babu Reddy
- Starring: Ganesh; Rekha Vedavyas; Avinash; Komal Kumar
- Cinematography: Satya Hegde
- Edited by: K. M. Prakash
- Music by: Jassie Gift
- Production company: Nitin Productions
- Release date: 8 June 2007
- Country: India
- Language: Kannada

Hudugaata ( transl. Childish) is a 2007 Indian Kannada-language film. It features Ganesh and Rekha Vedavyas in the lead roles. It is based on the 1934 American film It Happened One Night.

== Plot ==
Priya Rao is the daughter of a Bangalore-based business tycoon, S. K. Ananth Rao. She is head-over-heels in love with tennis player Rahul, but Ananth Rao strongly disapproves of their courtship. One night, Priya escapes from her home and hops onto a bus to Kanyakumari to be with Rahul. Meanwhile, Ananth Rao, realizing his daughter has run away, dispatches private detectives to locate her. Aboard the bus, Priya meets Balu Mahendar aka Balu, a loud-mouthed journalist who has just secured a job as a sports reporter. He heads to Kanyakumari to interview Rahul and offers to help Priya in exchange for an exclusive story on her. Priya is forced to agree to his demands, as he threatens to let her father know of her whereabouts should she not comply. After both of them happen to miss the bus, Balu and Priya go through various adventures together and find themselves falling in love with one another.

Balu falls for Priya, but knows that financially he is in no shape to do so. Priya also falls for Balu and decides to go with him, but a misunderstanding leads her to believe that Balu was just looking for a story and not her love. She quits on Balu, returns home and agrees to marry Rahul. However, Ananth Rao learns about Balu when he comes to him to take back the money, spent by Balu on Priya on his way to Kanyakumari. He realizes how Balu has taken care of Priya during the trip. Priya misunderstands Balu and believes that he might have arrived for the reward announced by Ananth Rao. Ananth Rao tells Priya that Balu is the right man for her and that he has not arrived for the reward. On the wedding day she realizes that Balu really loves her and then runs away from the marriage hall to Balu with Ananth Rao's support.

== Cast ==
- Ganesh as Balu Mahendar
- Rekha Vedavyas as Priya Rao
- Avinash as S. K. Ananth Rao
- Komal as "Mathi" Madesha
- Karibasavaiah as Krishnappa, bus conductor
- Shobaraj as a goon who is in search of Priya.
- Sathyajith as Subra Shastry
- Santhosh as Rahul, tennis player
- Vishwa
- Sunil
- Tumkur Mohan as truck driver

== Soundtrack ==
The soundtrack was composed by Jassie Gift, marking his Kannada debut. The song "Mandakiniye" was the same composition as "Lajjavathiye" from the Malayalam film 4 the People. The song "Stylo Stylo" was the same composition as "Bomma Bomma" from the Malayalam film Shambhu. After the success of this film, Gift went on to do more Kannada films.

Hudugaata

Soundtrack album by Jassie Gift
- Released: 13 April 2007
- Genre: Feature film soundtrack
- Length: 34:32
- Label: Anand Audio

Jassie Gift chronology
| Balram vs. Tharadas (2006) | Hudugaata (2007) | Thee Nagar (2007) |

Track list
| No. | Title | Lyrics | Singer(s) | Length |
|---|---|---|---|---|
| 1. | "Stylo Stylo" | Kaviraj | Jassie Gift, George Peter, Emil, Prasanna | 4:39 |
| 2. | "Mandakiniye" | Kaviraj | Jassie Gift, Vasundhara Das | 4:35 |
| 3. | "Are Are Saaguthide" | Jayanth Kaikini | Naresh Iyer, K. S. Chithra | 5:28 |
| 4. | "Ommomme Heegu" | Kaviraj | Zubeen Garg, Alisha Chinai | 5:28 |
| 5. | "Ishtu Jana" | Kaviraj | Karthik, Saindhavi, Jassie Gift, Chetan Sosca | 5:00 |
| 6. | "Yeno Onthara" | Kaviraj | Shaan, Shreya Ghoshal | 4:57 |
| 7. | "Nenapagade" | Kaviraj | Vijay Yesudas, Rajalakshmi | 5:36 |
| Total length: | | | | 34:32 |

== Reception ==
A critic from Rediff.com wrote that "If you want to see the film for Ganesh, then you will not be disappointed. But if you have seen the original, the film is sure to disappoint you". A critic from Sify wrote that "The redeeming features of this film are less characters, excellent cinematography and editing. On the downside there are few unwanted scenes which come as speed breakers".
