= Seelabathi =

- Directed by: R. Sarath
- Screenplay by: R. Sarath
- Story by: R.Sarath
- Starring: Kavya Madhavan; Narain Sreerenjini K parvathi
- Cinematography: Anand Balakrishnan
- Music by: Ramesh Narayan
- Production company: Rithu Films
- Distributed by: Shirdhisai Release
- Release date: 9 December 2005
- Country: India
- Language: Malayalam

Seelabathi is a 2005 Malayalam drama film written and directed by R. Sarath, starring Kavya Madhavan and Narain Sreerenjini k parvathi in the lead roles. The film, according to the director, is for "all those girls who have been reported missing from several parts of the State."

The film opened on 12 December to critical acclaim.

== Plot ==
The movie begins with the arrival of Seelabathi and her mother, Sumangala, to Kerala from Bengal. Though Sumangala returns to Bengal, Seelabathi stays behind as she gets a temporary job as a computer teacher in a school for a few months. She stays with her grandparents, and her grandfather, a farmer, loves farming. In school, she soon adapts to things and becomes friendly with her students. Sheelabathi also meets a young doctor, Jeevan, with whom she becomes friendly. In the village, people come to dig huge bore wells which result in water scarcity. Young students disappear mysteriously from school and end up being sexually exploited. Their parents accuse that incidents were happening in the village due to Seelabathi's computer courses. The story narrates how Sheelabathi overcomes all the problems.

== Cast ==
- Kavya Madhavan as Seelabathi
- Narain as Dr. Jeevan Bhasker
- Sreerenjini K as Student
- Urmila Unni as Sumangala
- Nedumbram Gopi
- Indrans as Vasu/Basu
- C. K. Babu as farmer
