= Anitha Shaiq =

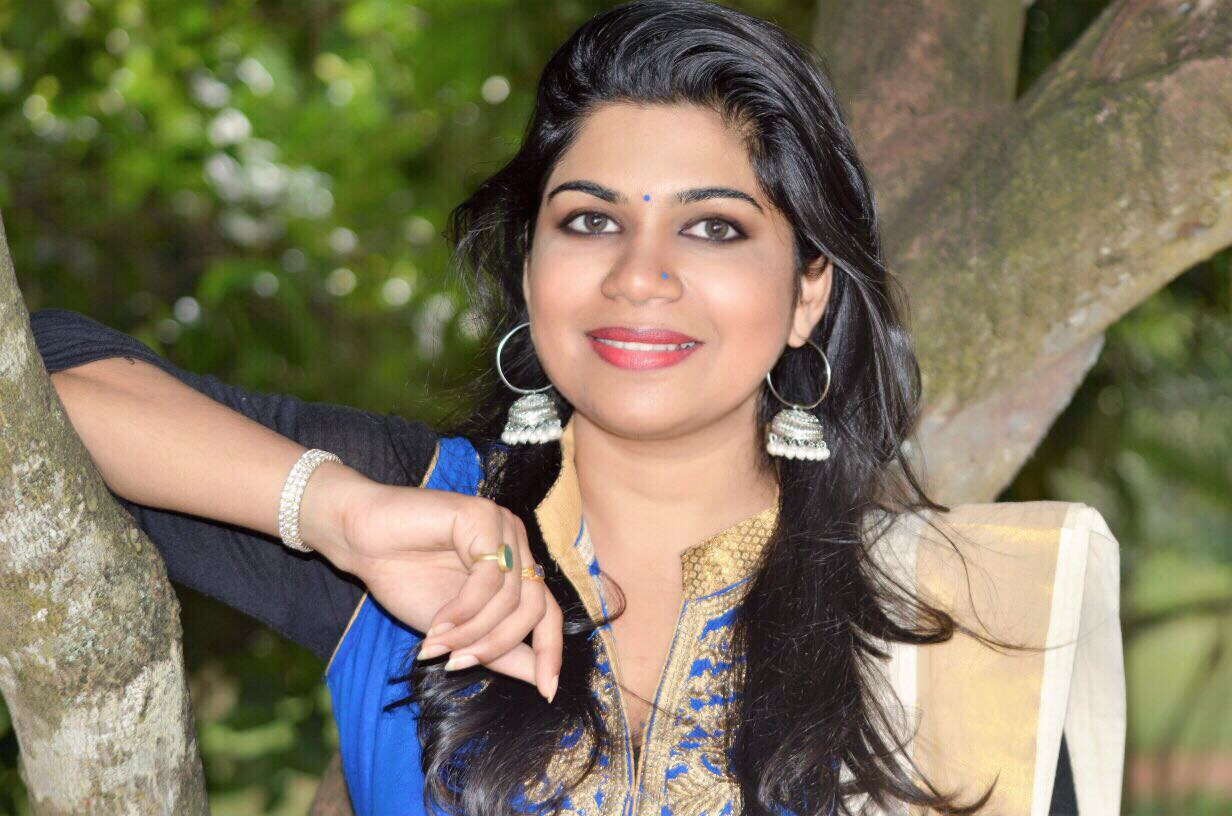

Background information
- Born: Anitha Shaiq; Thiruvananthapuram
- Genres: Sufi, Ghazal and playback singer
- Occupations: Singer, composer
- Instrument: Vocals
- Years active: 2007–present

Anitha Shaiq, often credited as Anitha. S is an Indian playback singer, Sufi singer and music composer. She performs Indian classical, sufi, Ghazal, folk and pop music, having sung in Malayalam, Kannada, Telugu, Oriya, Punjabi, and Tamil languages. In her 18 years in the film industry, she has recorded songs for films in 12 different languages.

== Early life ==
Anitha Shaiq was born to Sirajuniza Begum, a secondary school music teacher, and Sheikh Ebrahim. She graduated from the Government College for Women, majoring in music. She has studied Hindustani, Sufi, Carnatic, and Western music.

== Career ==
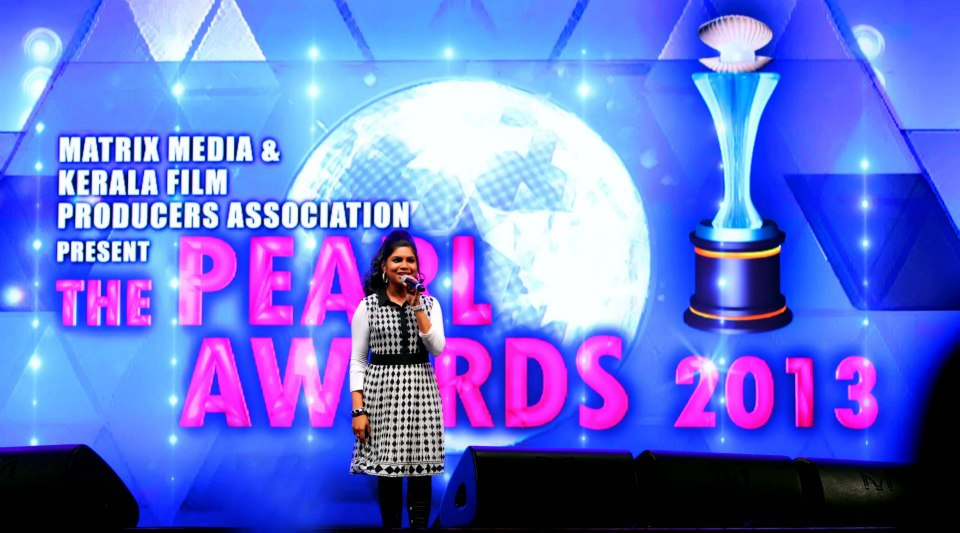
At Pearl Awards in Qatar

=== Composing ===
Shaiq composed the song "Melake Ponnal" for the film Crossroad directed by Lenin Rajendran.

=== Playback singing ===
Shaiq began her play back singing in 2007 with the hit song of that year composed by Sree. Vidyasagar. She has sung for many Malayalam, Tamil, Hindi and Kannada movies.

=== Musical albums ===
"Satrangee" is composed and sung by Anitha Shaiq, while it was produced by East Coast.The album consists of seven tracks written by legends like, Meera, Mirza Ghalib, Bulleh Shah, Amir Khusrow etc..The album was launched by the famous Indian Sufi singer Kailash Kher on 20 January 2015.

=== Live performances ===
Anitha has performed live concerts all over India, UAE, Bahrain, Qatar, Europe.

== Discography ==
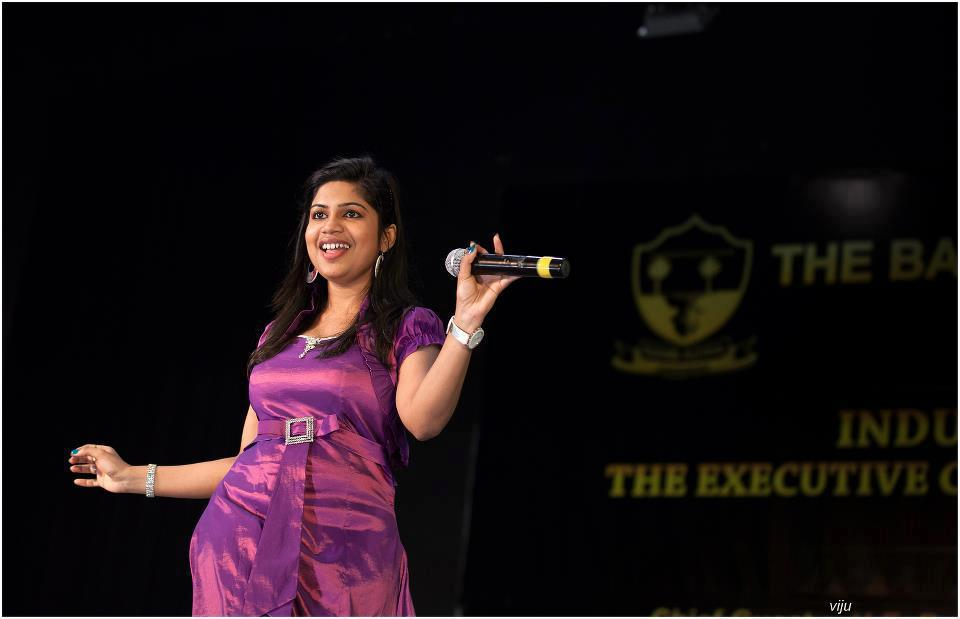
Anitha on a live show in Bahrain

Song	Movie	Music director	Language	year		
O mama	Rock n Roll	Vidyasagar	Malayalam	2007		
Thumbi Thumbi	Parunthu	Alex paul	Malayalam	2008		
Sarigamapa	Twenty Twenty	Berney Ignatious	Malayalam	2008		
Minnaminnikkoottam	minnaminnikkoottam	Bijibal	Malayalam	2008		
Rajakumari	lollipop	Alex paul	Malayalam	2008		
Ekanda chandrike	2 harihar nagar	Alex paul	Malayalam	2009		
Adavukal	2 harihar nagar	alexpaul	Malayalam	2009		
Kozhy chingara	Body Guard	ouseppachan	Malayalam	2009		
Maama maama	Simhakutty	raghavendra	Malayalam	2009		
Pathalle pathalle	Ringtone	shaan	Malayalam	2010		
Manassin vaathi	Killaadi	keeravaani	Malayalam	2010		
Mazha mazha	Killaadi	keeravaani	Malayalam	2010		
Panchasaara	Black&white kudumbam	Alex paul	Malayalam	2010		
Dhak dhak	Alexander the great	M G Sreekumar	Malayalam	2010		
Ola ola	In ghost house inn	Alex paul	Malayalam	2011		
Miya miya	In ghost house inn	Alexpaul	Malayalam	2011		
Laddu laddu	Aarvam	Rony raphel	Tamil	2011		
Annakkili	Kai	Ishaan Dev	Tamil	2011		
Theyyare	Varan	Mani sharma	Malayalam	2011		
Pathinettin	Holidays	Alex paul	Malayalam	2011		
Noda beda	Kalla malla sulla	Alex paul	Kannada	2011		
Nath nath	Badrinath	Keeravaani	Malayalam	2011		
Thuppa thuppa	Kalla malla sulla	Alex paul	Kannada	2011		
Odu paampe	Kochi to kodambakkam	Thaman	Malayalam	2011		
Kaadhaloru	Kaandharvan	Alex paul	Tamil	2012		
House full	Housefull	Sejo jone	Malayalam	2013		
Kanalu njaan	Idiots	Nandhu kartha	Malayalam	2013		
Raavoru	Rabecca Uthupp	Ratheesh vega	Malayalam	2013		
Kannaayiram	Solar Swapnam	Jayan	Malayalam	2014		
konjum ballyamalle	little superman 3D	mohan sitara	Malayalam	2014		
Arabean version	Ayne	rahulraj	Malayalam	2015		
to pain begaani	album	ganesh prasad	oriya	2016		
meree jaan	ekkadiki potavu chinnavada	sekhar chandra	Telugu	2016		
appangal	Usthad hotel||gopisunder||Tamil||2016|-	thakiladi melam	viswaasapoorvam manzoor	ramesh narayan	Malayalam	2017
Kettu marannoru	match box	bijipal	Malayalam	2017		
Melakey	cross road	anitha shaiq	Malayalam	2017		
kattukkul vettai	thulam	alex premnath	Tamil	2018		
khwajaa jee	kabeerinte divasangal	Malayalam	2019			
Rasa na otha	en kadhale	Tamil	2025			

== Awards and honours ==
Anitha received JESSEY Awards, Lions Club Musical Award, and GMMA Award and was nominated for the "Best singer" in the Asianet Film Awards.
