= Ennittum =

- Directed by: Renjilal Damodaran
- Written by: Rajendra Babu
- Produced by: Suresh .B. Nair
- Starring: Dinu Dennis; Siddharth Bharathan
- Cinematography: D.V. Rameshwaran
- Music by: Jassie Gift
- Production company: Balco Vision
- Release date: 18 February 2006
- Running time: 170 minutes
- Country: India
- Language: Malayalam

Ennittum is a 2006 Indian Malayalam drama film directed by Renjilal Damodaran (aka Renjith Lal), starring Dinu Dennis, Sidharth Bharathan, Swarnamalya and Kaniha in the lead roles. The film tells the story of four college-going youngsters.

== Cast ==
- Dinu Dennis as Prem Gopal
- Kaniha as Sneha
- Swarnamalya as Sujee
- Sidharth Bharathan as Jith (voiceover by Sarath Das)
- Dinesh Prabhakar
- Lalu Alex as Gopal
- T. P. Madhavan
- Shobha Mohan as Vaani Gopal
- Devan
- Manoj K. Jayan as Prof. Jayadevan
- Cochin Haneefa as Prof. Vilasan
- Salim Kumar as Fa.Perera Joseph
- Nelson Sooranad as Drunker
- Sreekala Sasidharan

== Soundtrack ==
Music: Jassie Gift, Lyrics: Kaithapram

1. "Pada" (Jassie Gift, Jyotsna)
2. "Orunoorashakal" (Chithra)
3. "Chellamanikattu" (Karthik, Ishaan Dev)
4. "Swarnameghame" (Jyotsna, Vidhu Prathap)
5. "Orunoorashakal" (Chithra, Srinivas)
6. "Veedellam " (Hridya Suresh, Rajesh)
