= Pradeep Palluruthy =

Indian Playback singer

- Genres: Malayalam
- Occupation: Playback singer

Pradeep Palluruthy is a Malayalam singer. He is from Cochin and is a singer in the Malayalam film industry. He has sung around 125 films. Pradeep Palluruthy's first Malayalam movie song was 'Punnyavanisahakkinundayi Randu Makkal' from Thommanum Makkalum. Even though Pradeep's directorial debut failed to materialize, he made his debut as an actor with Swapnasundari.
