= Ishaan Dev =

Indian musician

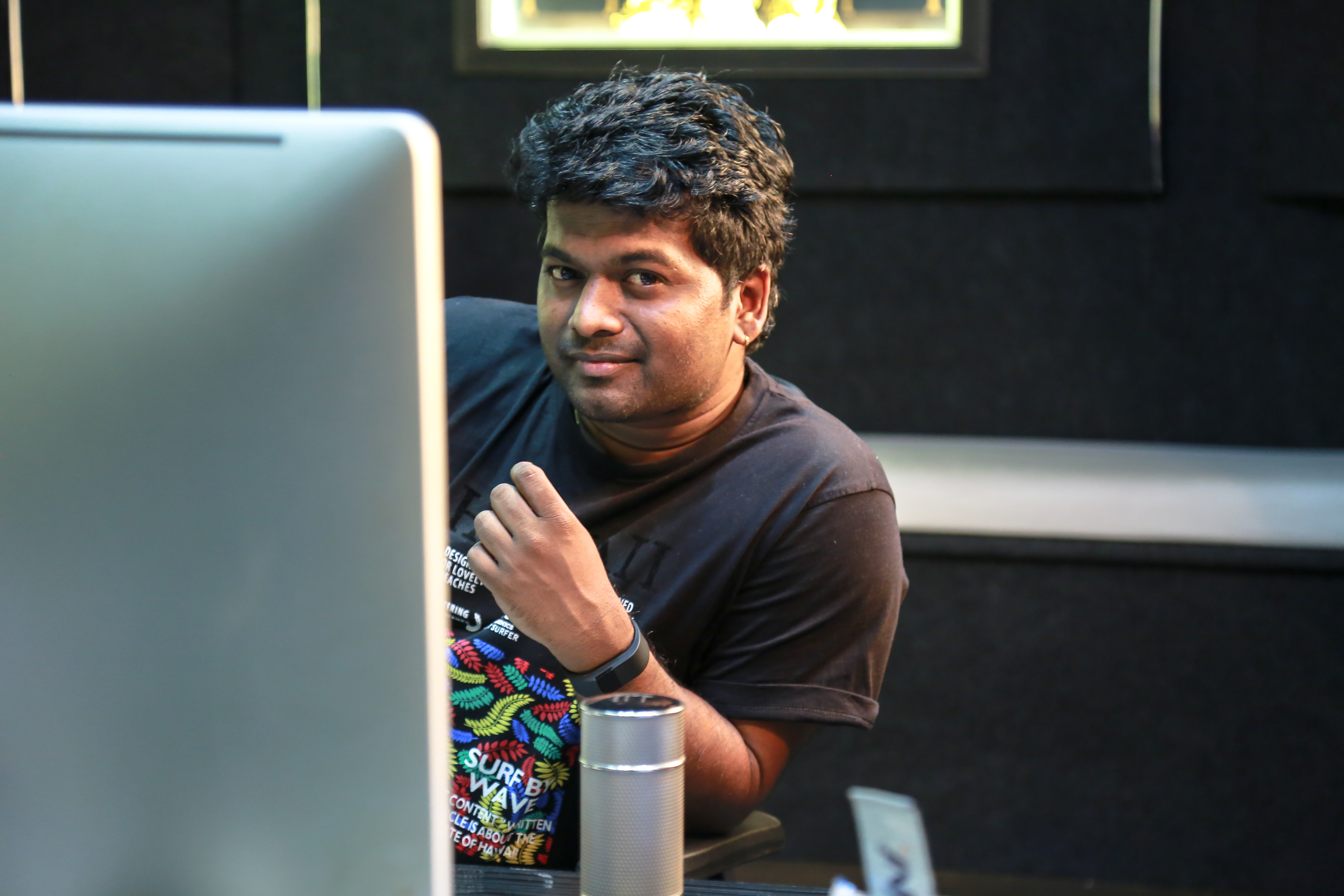

Background information
- Born: ShanMon.S.S; Trivandrum, India
- Genres: Carnatic music, Indian music, world music
- Occupations: Singer, music producer, composer, television presenter, percussionist
- Years active: 2004–present
- Website: ishaandevofficial.com

Ishaan Dev is an Indian music composer, singer-songwriter, multi-instrumentalist, music programmer and stage performer in several South Indian languages.

Hailing from Thiruvallam, Trivandrum, Kerala, India, Ishaan Dev worked in several South Indian languages. He won the Best Male Playback Singer Award at Mirchi Music Awards South for the Kannada Movie Shyloo in 2011. He had composed and recorded songs for several South Indian movies and established himself an identity as a musician in the industry. He is the composer and singer of the famous song, during the 2018 flooding in Kerala ‘Karalurappulla Keralam’ which gained special attention all across the nation.

== Early and personal life ==
Ishaan Dev always aspired to become a singer from an early age. He is always influenced by his father who is well-versed in Carnatic Music. At the age of three, he started learning Carnatic Music under the guidance of his father. Since then, he had the privilege to get guidance and formal training in Carnatic Music from several respected teachers. Ishaan believes that there is no end to learning music. He also receives formal training in Carnatic Music under the guidance of respected Dr. Cherthala Renganatha Sharma and Dr. Chandra Babu. He is also being trained in Western Music by Sri. Augustin Paul.

== Career ==
Ishaan Dev had a breakthrough while he was studying at the University College, Trivandrum in Kerala. He always mentioned his respect and gratitude to The Violin Maestro, Sri. Late Balabhaskar, who was also studying at the University College at the same time, and his tremendous support and influence on Ishaan's musical journey. Several times, Ishaan mentioned the Violin Maestro Sri. Late Balabhaskar is not only a teacher but also like his own brother. At the age of 17, Ishaan Dev and The Violin Maestro Sri. Late Balabhaskar and a few of their friends started the first Boy Band in Kerala called Con-Fusion. The First Boy Band was a huge hit and they jointly worked on the album Neeyariyan in which Ishaan Dev was the lead Singer. The songs ‘ Aaru Nee’, ‘ En Nenjile’, and ‘Naye Zamane ki Gana' received huge praises. Since 2005, Ishaan has worked in the Malayalam film industry. His theme song for the Malayalam movie ‘The Tiger’ released in 2005 and ‘Chinthamani Kolacase’ in 2006 claimed huge praises. Ever since He has worked on several original soundtracks and background scores in various south Indian languages. Ishaan also made his debut as a playback singer in 2004 with the song "Ponveyil Naalam" in the Malayalam movie Panchajanyam, composed by the late Sri. Balabhaskar. He worked as a Playback singer in several Malayalam and Kannada movies since then. In 2011, Ishaan won the Mirchi Music Awards South for the best playback male singer for the song Shyloo from the Kannada movie Shyloo.

In one of his interviews, Ishaan mentioned that his goal was to become a singer in a band. He achieved that goal and anything beyond what he received is all because of his passion for music. He tells his well-wishers that music has no limits and one should always be open to learning more.

Ishaan worked with the composer and playback singer Sri. Jassie Gift on the song "Lajjavathiye" in the film for the people.

He has done several cover songs which have become a huge hit among the public. He also performed in several stage shows and also performed at Kappa Music Mojo where he gained much attention. Ishaan's version of the "Thaarapadham" song became quite a hit among the public. One of his famous cover versions is "Kaathil thenmazhai".

Being a music composer, Ishaan Dev composed and sang "Karalurappulla Keralam" which became a huge success receiving a million views. The whole State of Kerala took the song to heart during the difficult times of 2018 flooding and COVID-19 and received special attention from the Chief Minister of Kerala Sri. Pinarayi Vijayan. Ishaan also worked with playback singer Shreya Ghoshal, composing the song "Iravil Varugire" from the Tamil Movie En Aaloda Seruppa Kaanom.

== Discography ==
Year	Film	Language	Notes
2005	The Tiger	Malayalam	Theme Song
2006	Chinthamani Kolacase	Malayalam	Theme Song
2006	The Don	Malayalam	Theme Song
2007	Detective	Malayalam	Sreeraj S R, Ishaan Dev
2008	Sound of Boot	Malayalam	Original soundtracks
2009	Kerala Cafe	Malayalam	Background score
2010	Ringtone	Malayalam	Original soundtracks & Background score
2010	The Thriller	Malayalam	Background Score
2011	Thaazhvaarakaatu	Malayalam	Original soundtracks & Background score
2012	Shyloo	Kannada	Singer
2012	Crime story	Malayalam	Original soundtracks & Background score
2012	Munjane	Kannada	
2012	Sankranthi	Kannada	
2012	Kai Thunindavan	Tamil	Original soundtracks & Background score
2015	Saaral	Tamil	Original soundtracks & Background score
2017	En Aaloda Seruppa Kaanom	Tamil	Original soundtracks
2018	Pattinapakkam	Tamil	
2019	Miga Miga Avasaram	Tamil	
2019	Uriyadi	Malayalam	
2023	Pulimada	Malayalam	Original soundtracks

== As playback singer ==
Year	Film	Language	Song	Notes
2004	Panchajanyam	Malayalam	"Ponveyil Naalam"	Composed by Balabhaskar
2004	Shambu	Malayalam	"Bomma"	Composed by Jassie Gift
2005	The Tiger	Malayalam	"Kaliyavishadhara"	Debut film as Composer
2005	December	Malayalam	"Alakadalin Alakalil"	Composed by Jassie Gift
2006	Chinthamani Kolacase	Malayalam	"Madhava Mahadeva"	
2006	The Don			
2010	Ringtone	Malayalam	"Tittle & Pathalle Pathalle"	
2011	Shyloo	Kannada	"Shyloo"	Won Best Male Playback Singer – Mirchi Music Awards South Won Best Male Upcoming Playback Singer – Mirchi Music Awards South
2011	Sankranti	Kannada	"Belakilla Baalalli"	Composed by V Sridhar
2012	Munjane	Kannada	"Yaaro Obba Sundari"	Composed by S. Narayan
2014	Medulla Oblongata	Malayalam	"O Sivane Puss Mariya"	Composed by Balagopal
2023	Pulimada	Malayalam	"Alakalil"	Composed by himself

== Albums ==
Songs	Notes	Composer
Aaru Nee En Nenjile Naye Zamane ki Gana Con-fusion	Album Neeyariyan by Con-Fusion Band	Balabhaskar
Dream Girl	Lyrics by Ishaan Dev	Jassie Gift
Kaalvari Snehame	Christian Devotional Song	Yesudas George
Neeye Ente Aashrayam	Devotional Song	Music & Lyrics : Fr.Shaji Thumpechirayil
Ithramam Snehamekuvan	Devotional Song	Jose holybeats
Aadi Niramayanam	Devotional Song -Ganesha Sthuthi	Vazhamuttom Chandrababu
Mullinte Muna	Folk song -Traditional lyrics	Ishaan Dev
Yakshi	Follk song -lyrics by Ishaan Dev	Ishaan Dev
Album -Thiruvayillam	Devotionls Songs -Parasurama Keerthanas	Composed by Ishaan Dev
En Prema kaanthanam Yesuve	Devotional	Yesudas george
Chank pilarnnu pankaliyaaki	Devotional	Vineeth Ram

== See also ==
- Mirchi Music Awards South
