= Bennet and the Band =

Indian backing band

Bennet and the Band is a backing band founded in 1998 by Bennet Roland, Guitarist/Music Director, from Kerala. Band specializes in genre based re-orchestration of popular melodies, Indian film tunes and traditional folk melodies for which the band uses session musicians lined up according to the type of music they need to play for the singer with whom they are jamming. Its performances with the singers often involve improvisation.

The band is not confined to a specific genre and it is easily understood from the various artists whom they have conducted jam sessions with, starting from Anuradha Sriram and Srinivas, to the young singers on block like Karthik, Vijay Yesudas, Vijay Prakash, Naresh Iyer, Swetha Mohan, Krish and Haricharan.

== Early days ==
Bennet's performance with Karthik in Wesley Grounds, Chennai was a remarkable one down the lane. The band along with the frontline singers Karthik, Gopal Rao, Kalyani Nair, Swetha Mohan, Mohammed Aslam performed in Pancham- "The magic of RD Burman, A tribute to RD Burman", playing hits from the 1970s. In the Rosebowl channel aired in 2006, they jammed with singers from South India like Karthik, Jyotsana, Gayatri, Franco, etc. and currently their show is being aired under the title “Music mojo” in Kappa TV, launched by Mathrubhumi, with singers Manjari and Haricharan.

Bennet Roland began composing music for films, beginning with the movie ‘Out of syllabus’ in the year 2006, for which he had composed four songs along with musician Veetrag. From there, the duo went on to compose songs for ‘Sooryakireedam’, Dr.patient, Gaddhama and August Club. As a guitarist, he has performed with the frontline singers KS Chithra, Udit Narayan, Shaan, Hariharan, Sujatha, Malgudi Shubha, Usha Uthup, etc.

== Live performances ==
- Ragam 08, the annual cultural fest of the National Institute of Technology Calicut, on 28 March 2008
- Festember 08, the annual cultural fest of National Institute of Technology, Trichy.
- Indian Premier League Twenty 20 cricket events held in Chennai.
- 9th foundation week celebration of UST Global in Thiruvananthapuram on 22 August 2008.
- Instincts'08, the annual cultural fest of Sri Sivasubramaniya Nadar College of Engineering (SSN), Chennai.
- 11th foundation week celebrations of UST Global, Trivandrum
- Cultural festival of JB Institute of Engineering and Technology (Autonomous) Hyderabad, in March 2008.
- Pulse 2010, culture fest of Gokaraju Rangaraju Institute of Engineering and Technology (GRIET), Hyderabad on 20 March 2010.
- Annual cultural festival of College of Engineering, Guindy (CEG), Chennai
- Mitafest'09, the cultural fest of Madras Institute of Technology (MIT), Chennai.
- Cultural fest of BITS Pilani Hyderabad Campus on 27 March 2010.
- International Carnival graVITas 2010 in VIT University Vellore on 17 September 2010.
- Annual Function (JASHN'10) of Multi National Company Capgemini Hyderabad in December 2010.
- RHYTHM, the annual cultural festival of Lal Bahadur Shastri College of Engineering, Kasaragod in February, 2010.
- Conjura 10', the annual Technical fest of TKM College of Engineering, Kollam in February 2010.
- The Times Hyderabad festival, held in 2011
- Airtel super singer - Tamil reality TV show, June 2011
- JASHN'12, annual cultural fest of Multi National Company Capgemini Bangalore, on 4 February 2012.
- Dyuthi'13, proshow in Govt. Engineering College, Thrissur, on 11 September 2013.
- AAGNEYA'14, the annual techno-cultural extravaganza of Govt. Engineering College BartonHill, Trivandrum on 1 March 2014
- GAMAYA'14, pro-show in NSS College of Engineering, Palakkad, on 21 September 2014
- ATHMA'15, pro-show at the annual techno-cultural extravaganza in AWH engineering college, calicut, Kerala on 19 February 2015.
- YAGNA DHRUVA'15, Pro-show at the annual techno-cultural fest of L B S Institute of Technology for Women, Trivandrum, Kerala on 8 March 2015
