= Arjun Sasi =

Indian singer

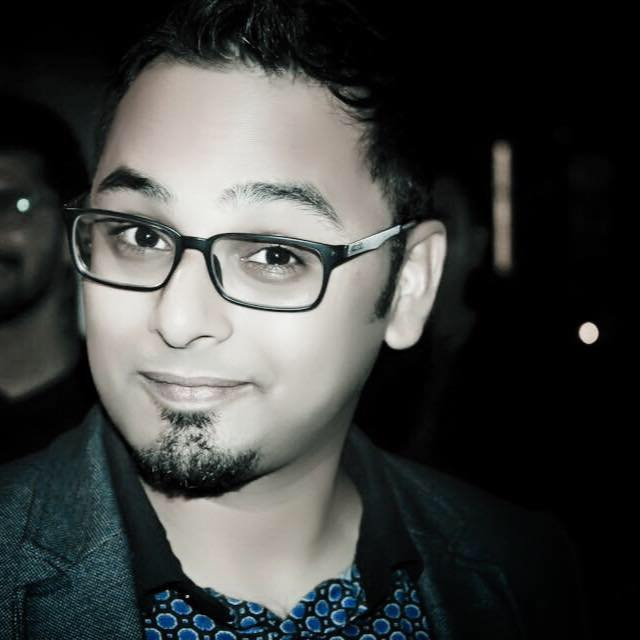
- Arjun Sasi in 2016

Background information
- Origin: Cochin, India
- Occupations: Playback Singer, Lyricist, Film Actor, rapper
- Years active: 2004–present

Arjun Sasi is an Indian rapper, singer, lyricist, and actor known for his work in Malayalam cinema. He first gained recognition in 2004 as a member of the Tamil pop band S5, launched by SS Music alongside Benny Dayal, Anaitha Nair, Suvi Suresh etc. Sasi later contributed to the 2007 album Malayalee with Vineeth Srinivasan, Shaan Rahman, and Jakes Bejoy, writing and performing the English-lyric track Friends Are Forever. He has lent his vocals and rap to works by notable music directors such as Santhosh Narayanan, Pravin Mani, Yuvan Shankar Raja, Vidyasagar, Jassie Gift, Rahul Raj, Suresh Peters, Deepak Dev, and Alphons Joseph. As an actor, he has played a lead role in the film Out of Syllabus directed by Jayaraj.

== Music career ==
Arjun’s career break came in 2004 when he was selected from thousands of participants to become a member of S5, a pop band created by SS Music Channel through the Fanta Voice Hunt competition. The band achieved significant recognition in South India’s independent pop music scene.

As a playback singer and lyricist, Arjun has contributed to numerous film projects in Malayalam cinema. His most recent and known collaborations include:

- Nayadikal – from the 2024 Malayalam film Pani, composed by Santhosh Narayanan, marking their reunion after 18 years.
- Rocket – a track from the Tamil film Retro, also composed by Santhosh Narayanan.
- Ottapuradan – with Malayalam rapper Fejo.
- Fly With Me – a bilingual English-Malayalam track with singer Ramya Nambeesan.

== Discography ==
He worked as an English lyricist, singer and rapper for the following songs.

For Malayalam Films

Movie/Album	Song	Music director
Retro	Rocket	Santhosh Narayanan
Pani	Nayadikal	Santhosh Narayanan
Ottappuradan (album)	Ottappuradan	Fejo
Fly With Me (album)	Fly With Me	Rahul Subrahmanian, Arjun Sasi
Ben Johnson	Munpe munpe, Ben Johnson	Deepak Dev
Raashtram	Rashtram theme	Deepak Dev
Kilukkam Kilukilukkam	Paattonnu paadan	Deepak Dev
By the People	all the songs by S5	Pravin Mani
Athishayan	Athishayan Theme	Alphons Joseph
Malayalee	Hey Naade	Jakes Bejoy
Unreleased	Aaranival	Alphons Joseph
Notebook	Prayer song	Mejo Joseph
Chotta Mumbai	Thala	Rahul Raj
Yes Your Honour	Yes Your Honour	Deepak Dev

For Tamil Films

Film	Song	Music director
Ponniyin Selvan	Do Re Mi	Vidyasagar
Vyuham	Vaa endru koopidum S5	Yuvan Shankar Raja
Emtan Magan	Kalloori	Vidyasagar
Runway	Athipalli Satthivelu	Vidyasagar
Isai	All songs by S5	Pravin Mani
Retro	"Rocket"	Santhosh Narayanan

Works done Internationally as a singer/rapper/lyricist

Movie/Album	Song	Music director
Take 3 Girls (UK release)	Title	Pravin Mani
World Peace	Monkeymind, System	Santhosh Narayanan
Ramji Londonwale	Title Track	Vishal Bhardwaj

== Filmography ==
Year	Title	Role	Notes
2005	By the People	Himself	Cameo appearance in the songs "Rock Me" and "Oh Laila Oh Majnu"
2006	Out of Syllabus	Gopikrishnan	
