= SuVi =

Indian singer (born 1987)

Suvi Suresh
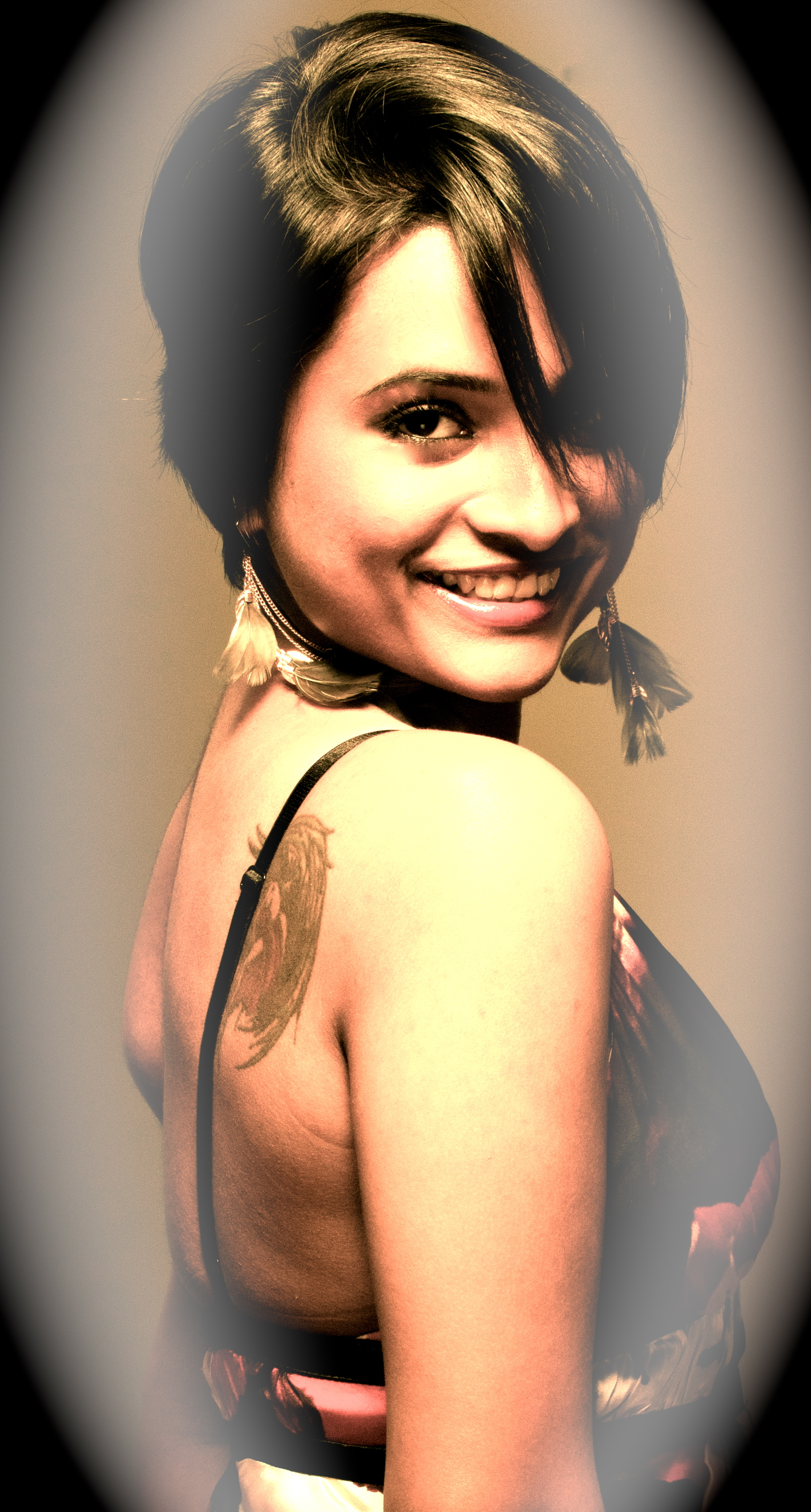
- Suvi in 2011

Background information
- Born: Swetha Suresh; 26 September 1987 (age 39); Thrissur, Kerala, India
- Genres: Playback singing, Indi-pop, Amapiano, Hip-Hop R&B
- Occupations: Singer; songwriter; DJ
- Years active: 2005–present
- Website: suvisociety.com

Suvi Suresh aka SUVI (born as Swetha Suresh on 26 September 1987) is an Indian playback singer who predominantly works in Tamil cinema. She was a member of the band S5 launched by the channel SS Music. She shot to fame with the song "Kodaana Kodi" from Saroja, composed by Yuvan Shankar Raja.

== Biography ==
Swetha hails from Thrissur, Kerala, India. She owes her name to a spelling mistake. She wanted to be known by her pet name "Swe" but on the Kuruvi cover her name was printed as "Suvi". She currently resides in Southern California.

== Career ==
Suvi auditioned for SS Music's voice hunt competition at age 17 and was selected to be part of S5 with Benny Dayal, Anaitha Nair, Bhargavi Pillai and Arjun Sasi. She also founded the band Soulsonic, the members of which currently perform with Funktuation, Benny Dayal's Band.

Suvi started singing for films with the song "Kodana Kodi" from Saroja (2008), which became a popular song. She has regularly collaborated with the film's composer Yuvan Shankar Raja on other soundtracks, such as Sarvam (2009), Billa 2 (2012), and Taramani (2017). She has also worked with the likes of A. R. Rahman and D. Imman.

== Discography ==
=== With S5 ===
Year	Album	Language
2005	Isai	Tamil
2005	By the People	Malayalam

=== Film credits ===
Year	Movie	Song	Co-artists	Composer	Language	Notes
2008	Saroja	"Kodaana Kodi"	Mohammed Aslam, Ranina Reddy	Yuvan Shankar Raja	Tamil	
2009	Laadam	"Makkah"	Benny Dayal, Haricharan, Rahul Nambiar	Dharan Kumar	Tamil	
2009	Sarvam	"Adada Vaa"	Ilaiyaraaja, Andrea Jeremiah	Yuvan Shankar Raja	Tamil	
2009	Maasilamani	"Odi Odi Vilayada"	Mukesh Mohamed, Emcee Jesz	D. Imman	Tamil	
2009	Vaamanan	"Lucky Star"	Mohammed Aslam, Blaaze	Yuvan Shankar Raja	Tamil	
2009	Snehituda	"Muddu Peru"	Suresh Bobblli	Shiva Shankar	Telugu	
2009	Naan Avan Illai 2	"Baaga Unnara"	Udit Narayan	D. Imman	Tamil	
2009	Kasko	"Dheera Gambeera"	Ranjith	Premgi Amaren	Telugu	
2010	Khiladi (D)	"Killadi Pilladu Veede"	Ranjith, Andrea Jeremiah, Vinaitha	Yuvan Shankar Raja	Telugu	
2010	Raavanan	"Keda Kari"	Benny Dayal, Bamba Bakya, A. R. Reihana, Tanvi Shah, Mili Nair	A. R. Rahman	Tamil	
2010	Villain (D)	"Gudaa Gudaa"	Bhagyaraj, Tanvi Shah, Shubha, Naresh Iyer, Sangeetha	A. R. Rahman	Telugu	
2010	Vilai	"Manmada Kaadu"	Nithyasree Mahadevan	D. Imman	Tamil	
2010	Thakita Thakita	"C'mon C'mon"	Karthik, Sam, Ranina Reddy, Bizmac	Bobo Shashi	Telugu	
2010	Bindaas Hudugi	"Sona Sona"		Yerra Ramesh	Kannada	
2010	The Thriller	"Mizhiyil"	Ranjith	Dharan Kumar	Malayalam	
2010	Chikku Bukku	"Adi Saarale"	Pradeep Vijay	Colonial Cousins	Tamil	
2011	Payanam	"Payanam"	Pravin Mani, Pradeep	Pravin Mani	Tamil	
2011	Nanban	"Asku Laska"	Vijay Prakash, Chinmayi	Harris Jayaraj	Tamil	
2011	Rockstar	"Hawa Hawa"	Mohit Chauhan, Viviane Chaix, Tanvi Shah, Pop Shalini	A. R. Rahman	Hindi	Additional vocals
2012	Sevarkkodi	"Velava Velava"	Kovai Kamala, Vinaya	C. Sathya	Tamil	
2012	Leelai	"Bubble Gum"	Benny Dayal, Sunitha Sarathy, Leon James	Satish Chakravarthy	Tamil	
2012	Billa II	"Yedho Mayakkam"	Yuvan Shankar Raja, Tanvi Shah	Yuvan Shankar Raja	Tamil	
2012	Suzhal	"Vaa Nanba Vaa"	Benny Dayal	L. V. Ganesh	Tamil	
2012	Suzhal	"Aadum Alai Mele"		L. V. Ganesh	Tamil	
2012	Mirattal	"Kalla Paravai"	Rahul Nambiar	Pravin Mani	Tamil	
2012	Mirattal	"Whistle Poodu"	Benny Dayal	Pravin Mani	Tamil	
2014	Highway	"Wanna Mash Up?"	Lady Kash and Krissy	A. R. Rahman	Hindi	
2017	Taramani	"Kaadhal Oru Kattukkadhai"	Rita	Yuvan Shankar Raja	Tamil	Also co-lyricist
2019	Kazhugu 2	"Sakalakala Valli"	Guru Ayyadurai	Yuvan Shankar Raja	Tamil	
2025	Indian 2	"Calendar Song"	Aishwarya Suresh	Anirudh Ravichander	Tamil	

=== Music videos ===
Year	Title	Language
2018	Wonder Woman	English
2020	Dopamine	English; Tamil
2020	Rani Raja	English
2021	Killa Kali Reborn	English
2024	Bliss	English

== Concerts ==
- Mega Unplugged (2010, telecasted on Mega TV)
