= List of Hindi songs recorded by Shweta Mohan =

Shweta Mohan is an Indian playback singer. She has received four Filmfare Awards South for Best Female Playback Singer, one Kerala State Film Awards and one Tamil Nadu State Film Awards. She has recorded songs for film music and albums in all the four South Indian languages namely, Malayalam, Tamil, Telugu, Kannada along with the Hindi language and has established herself as a leading playback singer of South Indian cinema. Some of her inspirations are Sujatha Mohan (her mother), Lata Mangeshkar and K.S. Chitra

== Film songs ==
| Year | Film | Song | Composer(s) | Lyricist(s) | Co-artist(s) |
|---|---|---|---|---|---|
| 2007 | Guru | "Baazi Laga" | A. R. Rahman | | |
| 2010 | Raavan | "Khilire" | A. R. Rahman | | |
| 2013 | David | "Yun Hi Re" | Anirudh Ravichander | | |
| 2018 | Kaala (D) | "Sajna" | Santhosh Narayanan | | |
| 2020 | 99 Songs | "Gori Godh Bhari" | A. R. Rahman | Navneet Virk | Alka Yagnik, Anuradha Sriram |
| 2021 | Marakkar: Lion of the Arabian Sea (D) | "Aankhon Mein" | Ronnie Rapheal | | Karthik |
| 2023 | Shaakuntalam (D) | "Madhura Kal Tu" | Mani Sharma | | Armaan Malik |
| 2023 | Valatty (D) | "Saathi Mere" | Varun Sunil | Lakshmi Menon | Sumonto Mukherjee |
| 2024 | Lucky Baskhar (D) | "Naaraazgi" | G.V. Prakash Kumar | Manoj Muntashir | Vishal Mishra |
| 2026 | Ranabaali (D) | "O Mere Saajan" | Ajay–Atul | Kshitij Patwardhan | Javed Ali |
| 2026 | Krishnavataram Part 1: The Heart(Hridayam) | "Mukhda Dikha Jaiyo" | Prasad S | Irshad Kamil | |
| 2026 | Krishnavataram Part 1: The Heart(Hridayam) | "Aayo Shubh Din" | Prasad S | Irshad Kamil | Abby V, Shivam Singh |

== Non-film songs ==
=== 2015 ===
| Album | Song | Composer(s) | Lyricist(s) | Co-artist(s) |
|---|---|---|---|---|
| Colours of Dusk | "Manmohana" | AR Rahman | Javed Akhtar | Aalap Raju |

=== 2017 ===
| Album | Song | Composer(s) | Lyricist(s) | Re-arranged by |
|---|---|---|---|---|
| Tribute to Lataji | "Lag Jaa Gale" | Madan Mohan | Raja Mehdi Ali Khan | Stephen Devassy |
| Tribute to Lataji | "Teri Aakhon Ke Siva" | Madan Mohan | Majrooh Sultanpuri | Stephen Devassy |
| Tribute to Lataji | "Ehsaan Tera Hoga" | Shankar–Jaikishan | Shailendra | Stephen Devassy |
| Tribute to Lataji | "Ajeeb Dastan" | Shankar–Jaikishan | Shailendra | Stephen Devassy |
| Tribute to Lataji | "Manmohana Bade Khoote" | Shankar–Jaikishan | Shailendra | Stephen Devassy |
| Tribute to Lataji | "Kabhi Kabhie Mere Dil Mein" | Khayyam | Sahir Ludhianvi | Stephen Devassy |
| Tribute to Lataji | "Kuchh N Kaho" | R. D. Burman | Javed Akhtar | Stephen Devassy |

=== 2018 ===
| Album | Song | Composer(s) | Lyricist(s) | Note(s) |
|---|---|---|---|---|
| Sub Mera Hai | "Sub Mera hai" | Bennet and the Band | Raqueeb Alam | Herself act in this. |

=== 2024 ===
| Album | Song | Composer(s) | Lyricist(s) | Co-artist(s) |
|---|---|---|---|---|
| Sthree- The Anthem | "Subah Ke Suraj" | Shweta Mohan | Manoj Yadav | Solo |
| Ganeshaya Deemahi | "Ganeshaya (Official Female Version)" | Ajay-Atul | Ajay - Atul | Solo |

=== 2025 ===
| Album | Song | Composer(s) | Lyricist(s) | Co-artist(s) |
|---|---|---|---|---|
| I Love You Love You Re (Indie Music Video) | "I Love You Love You Re" | Shweta Mohan | Manoj Yadav | Solo |

=== 2026 ===
| Album | Song | Composer(s) | Lyricist(s) | Co-artist(s) |
|---|---|---|---|---|
| S. Janaki - The Composer | "Hey Mero Manmohana" | S. Janaki | Meera Bhajan | Solo |
| S. Janaki - The Composer | "Saathi Re" | S. Janaki | S. Janaki | Solo |
| S. Janaki - The Composer | "Sanam Kya Karoon" | S. Janaki | S. Janaki | Solo |
