= Advocate Lakshmanan – Ladies Only =

Advocate Lakshmanan - Ladies Only
- Directed by: Pappan Payattuvila
- Written by: Padmakumar
- Produced by: S. Moha
- Starring: Mukesh; Ashokan; Mallika Kapoor
- Cinematography: K. V. Suresh
- Edited by: Ranjan Abraham
- Music by: Mohan Sithara
- Release date: 28 July 2010
- Country: India
- Language: Malayalam

Advocate Lakshmanan – Ladies Only is a 2010 Indian Malayalam-language film directed by Pappan Payattuvila. The film stars Mukesh, Ashokan and Mallika Kapoor.

== Plot ==
Advocate Lakshmanan, a specialist in divorce cases who appears in court only on behalf of women. His intentions are to help helpless women and he also runs a pickle company named 'Ladies Only', where he employs the women who find themselves alone after divorce.

Lakshmanan frequently gets calls from an unknown lady congratulating him after every win in court. Initially he is frustrated by these calls but later starts enjoying her calls. He later understands that this girl is ‘Annie’, a college lecturer in a city college and she is being threatened by a guy named Alex, who always calls her on the phone. Alex even kidnaps the girl from where Lakshmanan saves her. Lakshmanan soon marries her in an attempt that he thinks will save the girl as well.

When he wakes up the next morning, he find that Annie is missing. He gets a call from Alex who says Annie is with him. When Lakshmanan reaches the place, Alex says that his real name is Thomas George and Annie is his sister-in-law, both of whom have a grudge against Lakshmanan because he was behind the divorce case of Thomas and his wife Mary. Mary was found dead after a few days of divorce and they all blame it on Lakshmanan.

A few days later, Thomas is hospitalized following a murder attempt and Lakshmanan starts investigating this and finds that Thomas's business partner, Haridas is behind the murder of Mary. Lakshmanan helps Thomas in avenging Mary's death by killing Haridas. Also a now reformed Lakshmanan realizes his folly in separating a lot of couples.

== Cast ==
- Mukesh as Advocate Lakshmanan
- Ashokan as Thomas George/Alex
- Mallika Kapoor as Annie
- Lakshmi Sharma as Mary Thomas
- Suraj Venjaramoodu as Advocate Prahladan
- Jagadish as Degree Govindan
- Harisree Ashokan as Broker Sathyavan
- Usha as Pankajavalli, wife of Sathyavan
- Kochu Preman as Bhakthavalsalan
- Bindu S. Nair as Malathi, Bhakthavalsalan's wife
- Prem Kumar as Rajappan
- Geetha Vijayan as Meenakshi, Rajappan's wife
- Narayanankutty as Dr. Sugunan
- Mahima as Sumalatha, Sugunan's wife
- Ponnamma Babu as Saramma
- Maya Moushmi as divorce applicant
- Biju Kuttan
- Anand as Haridas
- Indrans
- Lakshmi Priya
- Gayathri
- Ambika Mohan as Thomas's mother
- Anil Kailas
