= S5 (band) =

Indian pop band (2004–2005)

- Origin: India
- Genre: Pop
- Years active: 2004–2005
- Label: Sony BMG
- Past members: Benny Dayal; Anaitha Nair; SuVi; Bhargavi Pillai; Arjun Sasi

S5 was an Indian pop band formed in 2004. The members of the band are Benny Dayal, Anaitha Nair, Suvi Suresh, Bhargavi Pillai and Arjun Sasi. They were the winners of the first SS Music voice hunt competition.

== Career ==
The band's only album, Isai (English: Music) with 8 songs in Tamil and composed by Praveen Mani, was released in March 2005; they later sung and performed it for the Malayalam movie By the People. S5 also recorded the song "Vaa Endru Koopidum" with composer Yuvan Shankar Raja for the film Vyuham.

After one year, the contract came to an end and the band split up.

== Discography ==
- Isai (2005 album)
- By the People (2005; Malayalam)
- Vyuham (unreleased)
