= Bennet–Veetraag =

Bennet Veetraag
- Genres: Film score, Indian classical music, Fusion music
- Occupations: Composer, music director, playback singer
- Years active: 2006–present
- Website: http://www.bennetandtheband.com

Bennet Veetraag are an Indian music composer duo in the Malayalam film industry. The duo consists of guitarist-songwriter Bennet and singer-musician Veetraag.

== Early years and career ==
Bennet and Veetraag hail from the city of Kozhikode, Kerala, India. He is also popular through his fusion band called Bennet and the Band that features various frontline singers from the Indian film industry. They debuted with the hit soundtrack for the Malayalam campus film Out of Syllabus. The songs "Poi Varuvaan" and "Ee Kalppadavil" were notable successes. Their next works, Sooryakireedam (2007) and Dr. Patient (2009) were also noted works. In 2011, the duo worked for Kamal's drama movie Gadhama, which won them critical praise and immediate success.

"Bennet Veetraag" won the best music director award in the Thikkurissi awards instituted by the Thikkurissi foundation for the movie Gadhama

== Discography ==
Year	Album	Track list
2006	Out of Syllabus	1. "Ee Kalppadavil" – G. Venugopal; 2. "Ee Kalppadavil" – Asha Ajay; 3. "Maayaa jaalakathin" Vineeth Sreenivasan; 4. "Poovin ithal" – Vidhu Prathap, Gayatri; 5. "Poi varuvaan" – Manjari; 6. "Poi varuvaan" – Veetrag
2007	Sooryakireedam	1. "Oru Swapna" – Jyotsna, Sugeetha, Sruthi, Ranjini Jose; 2. "Sneham Kondoru" – Veetraag, Chithra Iyer; 3. "Sneham Kondoru (Slow)" – Sharath, Delcy
2009	Dr. Patient	1. "Aakaasha Megham" – Karthik; 2. "Eeran Nilaave" – Veetrag, Shweta; 3. "Mazha Njaanarinjirunnilla" – Hariharan; 4. "Puthu Manjupol" – Balu Thankachan, Gayatri
2011	Gadhama	1. "Naattuvazhiyorathe" – K. S. Chithra, Vijay Yesudas; 2. "Ariyumo" – Karthik; 3. "Vidhuramee" – Shreya Ghoshal, Hariharan; 4. "Naattuvazhi" – K. S. Chithra; 5. "Vidhuramee Yathra" – Hariharan
2012	August Club	1. "Vaathil Chaarumo" – Shreya Ghoshal, Srinivas; 2. "Kaathorthuvo" – Sujatha Mohan, Veetrag; 3. "Kaattu Theno" – Shobi Tilakan, Vijay Prakash
