= Gayatri Asokan =

Indian singer

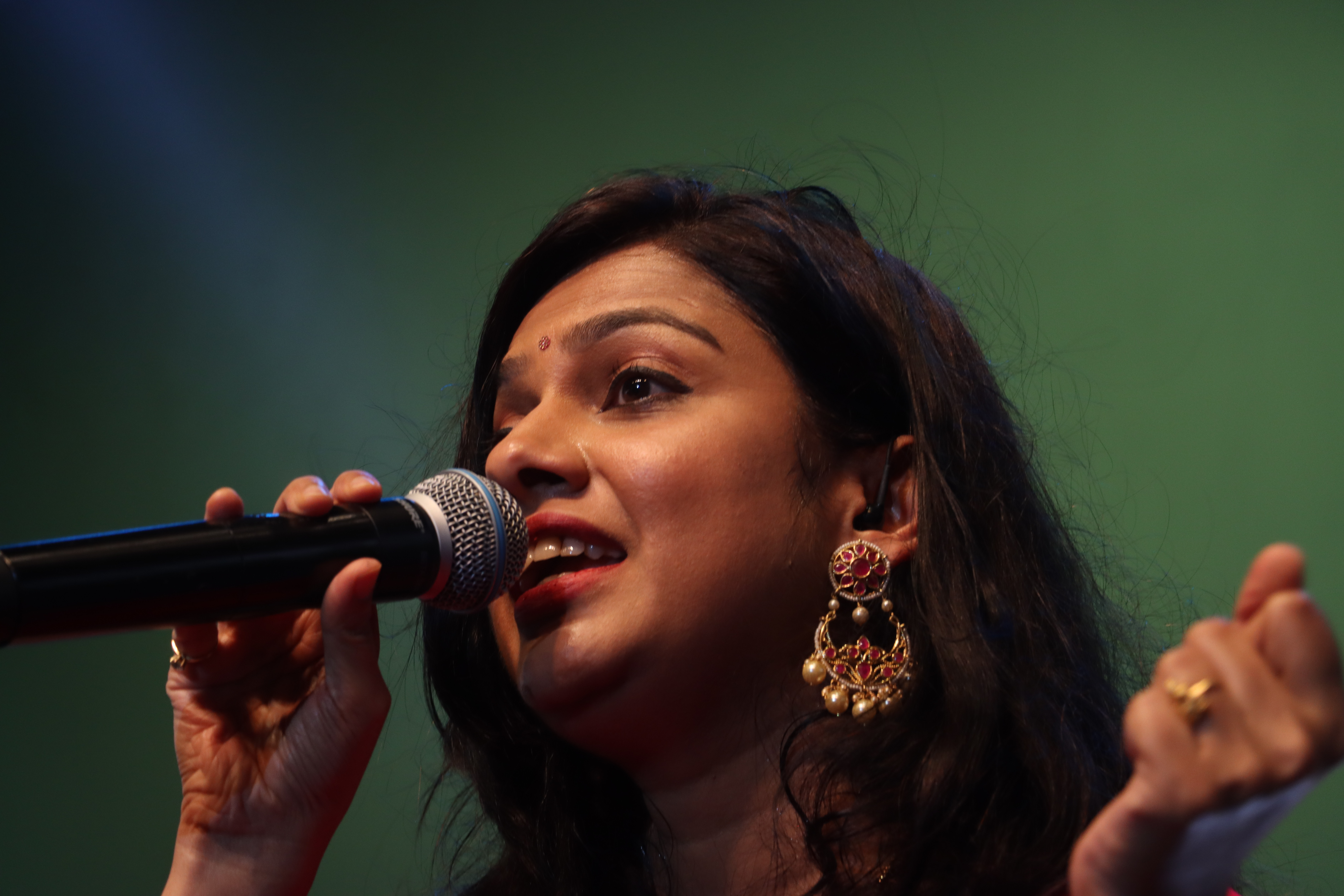
- Gayatri Asokan performs during the inaugural function of IFFK - 2022
- Born: Thrissur, Kerala, India
- Spouse: Purbayan Chatterjee (m. 2016)
- Musical career
- Genres: Playback, Hindustani, Carnatic music, Bhajans
- Occupation: Singer
- Instrument: Vocalist
- Years active: 2000–present
- Website: gayatriasokan.com

Gayatri Asokan is an Indian playback singer who works mainly in Malayalam cinema. She started her playback career with the song "Deena Dayalo Rama" for the film Arayannangalude Veedu (2000) for music director Raveendran. "Enthe Nee Kanna" for Sasneham Sumithra (2004) won her the Kerala State Film Award for Best Singer in 2003.

Her other songs include "Chanjadi Adi" from Makalkku (2005), "Thumbikkinnaram" from Naran (2005) and "Pularumo" from Ritu (2009).

== Early and personal life ==
Gayatri was born at Thrissur, Kerala, as the daughter of Dr. P. U. Asokan and Dr. K. S. Sunidhy. She was educated at Presentation Convent School in Kozhikode and at Vimala College in Thrissur.

Gayatri was married to Dr. Sayij on 4th January 2005, but the couple later divorced. She was then married to sitar player Purbayan Chatterjee in 2016.

== Career ==
Gayatri was first trained in Carnatic music by Sri Mangat Natesan and Sri Vamanan Namboodiri at Trichur. Later she started training in Hindustani music under Dr. Alka Deo Marulkar in Pune and later under Pandit Vinayaka Torvi in Bangalore.

She is also a Hindustani classical music singer, a Bhajan singer and has given Hindustani concerts and programs based on film songs abroad. She has sung 500 movie songs and has also sung and given music for a new album for the Art of Living foundation which was released in September 2006 by His Master's Voice worldwide. She recently sang for an album by Ilayaraja, Thiruvasagam, which was released by Sony Music.

Since 2017, Gayatri withdrew from film music industry and started focussing on gazals.

== Other activities ==
Gayatri is a jury member for the hit reality shows like Super Star Global on Amrita TV, Sakalalavallabhan on Asianet, Top Singer 2 and Musical Wife on Flowers TV. She is now anchoring popular gazal show Khayal on MediaOne TV and Gandgarvasangeetham 2010 on Kairali TV. In 2019, she performed in Jashn-e-Rekhta, a three-day annual Urdu festival and in Urdu Heritage Festival, Delhi.

== Film songs (partial) ==
=== 2000 ===
| Film | Song | Composer(s) | Lyricist(s) | Co-artist(s) |
|---|---|---|---|---|
| Arayannangalude Veedu | "Deena Dayalo Rama" | Raveendran | Gireesh Puthanchery | K. J. Yesudas |
| Dreamz | "Kannil Kaasi Thumbakal" | Vidyasagar | Gireesh Puthanchery | P. Jayachandran |
| Kochu Kochu Santhoshangal | "Sivakara Damaruka Layamai" | Ilayaraja | Kaithapram Damodaran Namboothiri | K.S.Chithra |
| Kochu Kochu Santhoshangal | "Ghanashyama Vrindaranyam" | Ilayaraja | Kaithapram Damodaran Namboothiri | Solo |

=== 2001 ===
| Film | Song | Composer(s) | Lyricist(s) | Co-artist(s) |
|---|---|---|---|---|
| Goa | "Niramizhi konil" | Premkumar Vadakara | Gireesh Puthanchery | K.J. Yesudas |
| Soothradharan | "Darshan" | Raveendran | SP Ramesh | S.P.Balasubrahmaniam |
| Soothradharan | "Hari Om [Shyama Hare]" | Raveendran | S.Ramesan Nair | Viswanath |
| Uthaman | "Palaazhi Theeram Kandu" | Johnson | Kaithapram Damodaran Namboothiri | Solo |

=== 2002 ===
| Film | Song | Composer(s) | Lyricist(s) | Co-artist(s) |
|---|---|---|---|---|
| Kalyanaraman | "Kadhayile Rajakumaranum" | Berny-Ignatius | Kaithapram Damodaran Namboothiri | Solo |
| Onnaman | "Maanathe Thudiyunarum" | S. P. Venkitesh | Gireesh Puthanchery | K.J.Yesudas |
| Adheena | "Karayathe Ponnumakale" | Natesh Sankar | Joffy Tharakan | Solo |
| Madhuram | "Ho Ho Ho" | shakeer Jacksom | Joffy Tharakan | Solo |

=== 2003 ===
| Film | Song | Composer(s) | Lyricist(s) | Co-artist(s) |
|---|---|---|---|---|
| Sthithi | "Let's Wipe The Tears" | Sunny Viswanath | Priya Viswanath | Maya Kartha |
| Mullavalliyum Thenmavum | "Thamara Noolinal" | Ouseppachan | Gireesh Puthanchery | G. Venugopal |

=== 2004 ===
| Film | Song | Composer(s) | Lyricist(s) | Co-artist(s) |
|---|---|---|---|---|
| Swarna Medal | "Chinga Naal" | Simon | Unknown | Solo |
| Swarna Medal | "Malare Neeyuarangoo" | Simon | Unknown | Solo |
| Greetings | "Mizhikalil (f)" | Raveendran | Gireesh Puthanchery | Solo |
| Greetings | "Mizhiklil (D)" | Raveendran | Gireesh Puthanchery | Devanand |
| Sasneham Sumithra | "Enthe Nee Kanna" | Ouseppachan | Shibu Chakravarthy | Solo |

=== 2005 ===
| Film | Song | Composer(s) | Lyricist(s) | Co-artist(s) |
|---|---|---|---|---|
| Naran | "Thumpi Kinnaram" | Deepak Dev | Kaithapram Damodaran Namboothiri | K.J.Yesudas |
| Naran | "Thumpi Kinnaram (Unplugged)" | Deepak Dev | Kaithapram Damodaran Namboothiri | K.J.Yesudas |
| Makalkku | "Chaanchadiyaadi Urangu Nee " | Ramesh Narayan | Kaithapram Damodaran Namboothiri | Solo |
| Daivanamathil | "Naseebulla" | PV Manzoor | PV Manzoor | Solo |
| Daivanamathil | "Maalakhamar" | PV Manzoor | PV Manzoor | Noorjahan |

=== 2006 ===
| Film | Song | Composer(s) | Lyricist(s) | Co-artist(s) |
|---|---|---|---|---|
| Out of Syllabus | "Poovinithal" | Bennet-Veetraag | Prabha Varma | Vidhu Prathap |
| Photographer | "Chandrika Raavu" | Johnson | Kaithapram Damodaran Namboothiri | Vijesh Gopal |
| Boss I Love You (Dubbed version) | "Mazha Mukilazhke" | Kalyani Malik | Rajeev Alunkal | Biju Narayanan |

=== 2007 ===
| Film | Song | Composer(s) | Lyricist(s) | Co-artist(s) |
|---|---|---|---|---|
| Kaiyoppu | "Jalthe He Kiske" | Vidyasagar | Majrooh Sulthanpuri | Rafeeq Ahammed Solo |
| Arabikatha | "Thirike Njaan (f)" | Bijibal | Anil Panachooran | Rafeeq Ahammed Solo |
| Flash | "Nin Hrudaya Mounam(f)" | Gopi Sunder | Rafeeq Ahammed | |
| Pranayakalam | "Parayoo Prabhathame" | Ouseppachan | Rafeeq Ahammed | |

=== 2008 ===
| Film | Song | Composer(s) | Lyricist(s) | Co-artist(s) |
|---|---|---|---|---|
| Rathri Mazha | "Rathrimazha(FD)" | Ramesh Narayan | Sugathakumari | K.S.Chithra |
| Rathri Mazha | "Rathrimazha(MD)" | Ramesh Narayan | Sugathakumari | Ramesh Narayan |
| Mulla | "Kannin Vaathil Chaarathe (f)" | Vidyasagar | Vayalar Sarathchandra Varma | Solo |

=== 2009 ===
| Film | Song | Composer(s) | Lyricist(s) | Co-artist(s) |
|---|---|---|---|---|
| Madhyavenal | "Swantham Swantham(F)" | Kaithapram Viswanathan | Kaithapram Damodaran Namboothiri | Solo |
| Madhyavenal | "Syama" | Kaithapram Viswanathan | Soordas | Solo |
| Rithu | "Pularumo Ravozhiyumo" | Rahulraj | Rafeeq Ahammed | Suchith Sureshan |
| Colours | "Konchi Kochi" | Suresh Peters | Gireesh Puthanchery | Sangeetha Sreekanth |
| Dr. Patient | "Puthu Manjupol" | Bennet-Veetraag | Rafeeq Ahammed | Balu Thankachan |

=== 2010 ===
| Film | Song | Composer(s) | Lyricist(s) | Co-artist(s) |
|---|---|---|---|---|
| Pranchiyettan & the Saint | "Kinavile Janalakal" | Ouseppachan | Shibu Chakravarthy | Solo |

=== 2011 ===
| Film | Song | Composer(s) | Lyricist(s) | Co-artist(s) |
|---|---|---|---|---|
| Violin | "Himakanam" | Bijibal | Rafeeq Ahammed | Ganesh Sundaram |
| Beautiful | "Nin Viral Thumbil" | Ratheesh Vega | Anoop Menon | Solo |
| Priyappetta Nattukare | "Nin Viral Thumbil" | Aji Sharas | V Vishnu Das | Solo |
| Koratty Pattanam Railway Gate | "Imakalil Viriyum" | Gayoz Jihnson | Shaji Jaleel | Vidhu Prathap |

=== 2015 ===
| Film | Song | Composer(s) | Lyricist(s) | Co-artist(s) |
|---|---|---|---|---|
| Loham | "Manchadi Meghame" | Sreevalsan J. Menon | Rajeev Nair | Amal Antony |

| Song | Film | Music director |
|---|---|---|
| Deena Dayalo Rama | Arayannangalude veedu | Raveendran |
| Thamara Noolinaal | Mullavalliyum thenmaavum | Ouseppachan |
| Kannil Kashi Thumba | Dreams | Vidyasagar |
| Chanjadi Aadi | Makalkku-manjari | Ramesh Narayan |
| Enthe Nee Kanna | Sasneham Sumitra | Ouseppachan |
| Thumbi Kinnaram | Naran | Deepak Dev |
| Kadhayile Rajakumaranum | Kalyanaraman | Berny-Ignatius |
| Chandrika Ravil | Photographer | Johnson |
| Rama hare | Soothradharan | Raveendran |
| Maakhamar | Daivanamathil | P.V.Mansoor |
| Nassebulla | Daivanamathil | Mammutti |
| Poovin Ethal Cheppil | Out of Syllabus | Bennet Veetraag |
| Enthe nee thannilla | Yes your Honour | Deepak Dev |
| Parayu Prabhathame | Pranayakalam | Ouseppachan |
| Thirike Njan | Arabhikadha | Bijibal |
| Nin Hridaya Mounam | Flash | Gopi Sunder |
| Kannin vaathil | Mulla | Vidhyasagar |
| Pularumo | Ritu | Rahul Raj |
| Puthu Manjupol | Dr. Patient | Bennet Veetraag |
| Kinavile | Pranchiyettan and the Saint | Ouseppachan |
| Ninviral Thumbil | Beautiful | Ratheesh Vegha |
| Imakalil Viriyum | Koratty Pattanam Railway Gate | Gayoz Johnson |
| Thullimajin | Ayalum njanum thammil | Ouseppachan |
| Sugandha Neerala | Friday | Roby Abraham |
| Mazhakondu Mathram | Spirit | Shahabaz Aman |
| Varaveena Shruthi meetti | Swaasam | Kannan Bhai |
| Mazhaneer | 5 Sundarikal (Gowri) | Bijibal |
| Uppongela Godavari-Female Version | Godavari | K.M. Radhha Krishnan |
| Varikomale(F) | Jilebi | Bijibal |
| Shivakara damaruka | Kochu Kochu Santhoshangal | Ilayaraja |
| Ghanashyama vrinda | Kochu Kochu Santhoshangal | Ilayaraja |
| Neermizhikonil | Goa | Premkumar vadakkara |
| Ariyathe ennil nee | Ee Mazhayil (2019) | Anoop Sathyaraj |

== Albums ==
1. Anahata- Art of Living
2. Neeyum Nilavum- Manorama Music
3. Thiruvasagam -Sony Music
4. Vishudhi- Art of Living
5. Sarveshwari- Art of Living
6. Iniyennum _ East Coast
7. Pranayathhin Ormakal
8. Ghazals by Unnatural
9. Palanivel
1. Smaran – Art of Living
2. Sankirtan – Art of Living
3. Chants for workplaces – Kedar Pandit

== Awards ==
- Kerala State Film Award for Best Singer (2003) – Enthe Nee Kanna – Sasneham Sumitra
- 2007 :Art of Living award for Outstanding Women Achievers
- 2011 :Asianet Television Awards for best playback singer -Harichandanam
- 2012 :Asianet Television Awards for best playback singer -Agniputhri
