= Rafeeq Ahamed =

Indian poet, lyricist and novelist

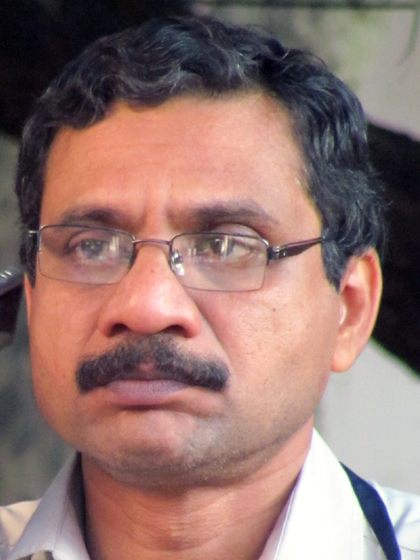
- Born: 17 December 1961 (age 64); Thrissur, Kerala, India
- Education: Sree Krishna College, Guruvayur
- Occupations: Poet; Lyricist; Novelist
- Years active: 1997–present

Rafeeq Ahamed (born 17 December 1961) is an Indian poet, lyricist and novelist. He has won the Kerala Sahitya Akademi Award for Poetry and is a six-time winner of the Kerala State Film Award for Best Lyrics. With more than 600 songs to his credit, Rafeeq Ahamed is regarded as the most successful and critically acclaimed lyricist of contemporary Malayalam films.

== Early life ==
Rafeeq Ahamed was born to Syed Sajjad Hussain and Thithayikutty on 17 December 1961 in Akkikavu, Thrissur district. He graduated in English literature from Sree Krishna College, Guruvayur.

== Literary career ==
Rafeeq Ahamed authored a number of poems. Some of his collections include Swapnavangmoolam, Paarayil Paninjathu, Aalmara and Cheettukalikkar. He won the Kerala Sahitya Akademi Award for Poetry in 2006 for the collection Aalmara. He is also a recipient of Vyloppilli Award, Odakkuzhal Award and P. Kunhiraman Nair Award. He also authored the novel Azhukkillam which was serialised in Mathrubhumi Illustrated Weekly and published as a book in 2015.

== Film career ==
He started his film career through the 1999 film Garshom directed by P. T. Kunju Muhammed. His second work as a lyricist was Perumazhakkalam, directed by Kamal. It was the music director M. Jayachandran who suggested Rafeeq to Kamal, based on an experience of working with Rafeeq for the title song of a television serial Samanathaalam. Rafeeq penned the lyrics of the much acclaimed song; Rakkilithan for Perumazhakalam and has since written more than 600 songs for about 300 Malayalam films.

== Bibliography ==
Poetry collections

Year	Title
2013	Rafeeq Ahamedinte Kavithakal
2012	Thoraamazha
2008	Gramavrikshathile Vavval
2008	Shivakami
2007	Cheettukalikkar
2006	Aalmara
2000	Paarayil Paninjathu
1996	Swapnavangmoolam

Novel

- Azhukkillam (2015)

== Partial filmography ==
=== 1990s ===
Year	Title	Notes
1997	Garshom	"Ethu Kaalaraathrikalkkum" "Parayaan Maranna"

=== 2000s ===
Year	Title	Notes
2004	Perumazhakkalam	1 song- "Rakkilithan"
2004	Athu Mandara Poovalla	Unreleased film
2006	Out of Syllabus	4 songs
2007	Paradesi	
2007	Pranayakalam	Kerala State Film Award for Best Lyrics
2007	Soorya Kireedam	
2007	Flash	
2007	Kaiyoppu	1 song
2008	Laptop	
2008	Thirakkatha	
2009	Dr. Patient	
2009	Rithu	
2009	T. D. Dasan Std. VI B	
2009	Kerala Cafe	
2009	Sufi Paranja Katha	Kerala State Film Award for Best Lyrics
2009	Paleri Manikyam	1 song

=== 2010s ===
Year	Title	Notes
2010	Sadgamaya	Kerala State Film Award for Best Lyrics
2010	Anwar	Filmfare Award for Best Lyrics, Vanitha Film Award for Best Lyrics
2010	Elsamma Enna Aankutty	
2010	Bombay Mittayi	4 songs
2010	Elektra	
2010	De Nova	
2010	Annarakkannanum Thannalayathu	
2011	Khaddama	
2011	Urumi	1 song- "Chalanam Chalanam"
2011	Bhakthajanangalude Sradhakku	
2011	Salt N' Pepper	
2011	The Train	
2011	Adaminte Makan Abu	
2011	Violin	
2011	Bombay March 12	
2011	Veeraputhran	
2011	Sevenes	1 song- "Meghathoppil"
2011	Snehaveedu	
2011	Swapna Sanchari	
2012	Unnam	
2012	Ithramathram	
2012	Orange	
2012	Orkut oru ormakkoottu	2 songs
2012	Ee Adutha Kaalathu	
2012	Thalsamayam Oru Penkutty	1 song
2012	Nidra	
2012	Josettante Hero	
2012	Doctor Innocentanu	
2012	Ustad Hotel	Asianet Film Award for Best Lyrics
2012	Diamond Necklace	
2012	Run Baby Run	
2012	Spirit	Kerala State Film Award for Best Lyrics, Amrita TV Film Awards for Best Lyrics, Filmfare Award for Best Lyrics; Vanitha Film Award for Best Lyrics
2012	Bachelor Party	
2012	22 Female Kottayam	1 song- "Neeyo"
2012	Cinema Company	
2012	Naughty Professor	
2012	Bhoopadathil Illatha Oridam	
2012	Last Bench	
2012	Theruvu Nakshatrangal	
2012	Molly Aunty Rocks!	
2012	Trivandrum Lodge	
2012	Idiots	
2012	101 Weddings	
2012	916	
2012	Theevram	1 song
2012	Scene Onnu Nammude Veedu	
2012	Poppins	1 song
2012	Chapters	
2012	Bavuttiyude Namathil	
2012	I Love Me	
2013	Oru Indian Pranayakadha	Amrita TV Film Awards for Best Lyrics
2013	10:30 am Local Call	
2013	Lokpal	
2013	Nee Ko Njaa Cha	
2013	Celluloid	
2013	Tourist Home	
2013	Radio	
2013	Kili Poyi	
2013	Lucky Star	
2013	Up & Down: Mukalil Oralundu	
2013	K.Q	
2013	Rebecca Uthup Kizhakkemala	
2013	Redwine	
2013	August Club	
2013	Immanuel	
2013	Ladies and Gentleman	
2013	Left Right Left	
2013	Sringaravelan	
2013	ABCD: American-Born Confused Desi	1 song - "Vaanam Puthumazha"
2013	5 Sundarikal	2 songs
2013	God for Sale	
2013	Artist	
2013	Kunjananthante Kada	
2013	Arikil Oraal	1 song
2013	Daivathinte Swantham Cleetus	
2013	North 24 Kaatham	2 songs
2013	3G	
2013	Idukki Gold	
2013	Vishudhan	
2013	Ezhu Sundara Rathrikal	
2014	Ettekaal Second	
2014	Salaam Kashmier	
2014	Pranayakadha	
2014	Pianist	
2014	How old are you	Asianet Film Award for Best Lyrics
2014	Gamer	
2014	Praise the Lord	
2014	Law Point	
2014	7th Day	1 song - "Mazhavil Chiraku"
2014	Onnum Mindathe	
2014	Cherukkanum Pennum	
2014	Bangalore Days	1 song - "Ethu Kari Ravilum"
2014	Vikramadithyan	1 song - "Megham"
2014	Beware of Dogs	
2014	Persiakaran	
2014	Njaan	
2014	Money Ratnam	
2014	Iyobinte Pusthakam	
2014	Tamaar Padaar	
2014	Mylanchi Monchulla Veedu	
2014	Angels	
2014	Kaaviya Thalaivan (Malayalam)	Dubbed Film
2014	Cousins	1 song - "Neeyen Vennila"
2014	Njangalude Veettile Athidhikal	
2014	Pakida	
2015	The Reporter	
2015	Rasputin	
2015	Alif	
2015	100 Days of Love	1 song
2015	Ennum Eppozhum	
2015	You Too Brutus	
2015	Bhaskar the Rascal	
2015	Ivide	
2015	Lukka Chuppi	
2015	Love 24x7	
2015	Loham	1 song
2015	Kaliyachan	
2015	Ennu Ninte Moideen	Kerala State Film Award for Best Lyrics, Asianet Film Award for Best Lyrics, Filmfare Award for Best Lyrics, Vanitha Film Award for Best Lyrics
2015	Pathemari	
2015	Ithinumappuram	
2015	Saigal Padukayaanu	
2015	Rani Padmini	
2015	Charlie	4 songs
2016	White	
2016	Kismath	1 song - "Nilamanaltharikalil"
2016	Maheshinte Prathikaaram	3 songs - "Idukki", "Theliveyilazhakum" and "Mounangal".
2016	Pulimurugan	1 song - "Kaadaniyum"
2016	Pachakkallam	
2016	Kattumakkan	
2016	Puthiya Niyamam	1 song
2016	Ithu Thaanda Police	
2016	Pa Va	2 songs
2016	Daffedar	
2016	Pretham	
2016	Guppy	1 song - "Athiraliyum"
2016	Thoppil Joppan	
2016	Ore Mukham	1 song
2017	Jomonte Suvisheshangal	
2017	Munthirivallikal Thalirkkumbol	
2017	Oru Mexican Aparatha	2 songs - "Aakaashakkuda", "Ivalaaro"
2017	Fukri	
2017	Campus Diary	
2017	Kaattum Mazhayum	
2017	Aby	
2017	Pareeth Pandari	
2017	Comrade in America	1 song - "Kannil Kannil"
2017	Viswasapoorvam Mansoor	2 songs
2017	Thondimuthalum Driksakshiyum	Asianet Film Award for Best Lyrics
2017	Cappucino	
2017	Hadiya	
2017	Matchbox	
2017	Naval Enna Jewel	1 song
2017	Velipadinte Pusthakam	1 song
2017	Crossroad	
2017	Kaattu	
2017	Zacharia Pothen Jeevichirippundu	
2017	Udaharanam Sujatha	1 song
2017	Aakashamittayee	
2017	Vimaanam	
2017	Mayanadi	1 song - "Kiliye"
2017	Masterpiece	1 song
2018	Carbon	2 songs
2018	Ente Mezhuthiri Athazhangal	
2018	Kallai FM	
2018	Sakhavinte Priyasakhi	
2018	Aami	
2018	Parole	1 song
2018	Kammara Sambhavam	1 song
2018	Uncle	
2018	Abrahaminte Santhathikal	
2018	Neerali	2 songs
2018	Koode	
2018	Ennaalum Sarath..?	
2018	Oru Kuttanadan Blog	2 songs
2018	Kayamkulam Kochunni	
2018	Odiyan	2 songs - "Kondoram", "Maanam Thudukkanu"; Vanitha Film Award for Best Lyrics
2018	Paviyettante Madhurachooral	
2019	The Great Indian Road Movie	
2019	Uyare	2 songs - "Nee Mukilo", "18 Vayassilu"
2019	Naan Petta Makan	
2019	My Great Grandfather	
2019	Munthiri Monchan	1 song
2019	And the Oscar Goes To...	
2019	Kakshi: Amminippilla	1 song
2019	Pranaya Meenukalude Kadal	
2019	Ganagandharvan	1 song
2019	Mamangam	3 songs
2019	Nalpathiyonnu (41)	

=== 2020s ===
Year	Title	Notes
2020	Big Brother	
2020	Ayyappanum Koshiyum	"Thaalam poi"
2020		"Ariyathariyathariya"
2020	Karnan Nepolian Bhagat Singh	
2020	Shyamaragam	
2021	One	
2021	Varthamanam	
2021	Black Coffee	
2021	Kuruthi	"Vetta Mrugam"
2022	Randu	
2022	Bheeshma Parvam	"Aakasham Pole"
2022	Pathonpatham Noottandu	
2022	Ponniyin Selvan: I (Malayalam)	
2023	Pulimada	"Arikil Onnu Vannal"
2023	Otta	"Parakkum Parava Poley"
2023	Otta	"Paral"
2023	Otta	"Peyneer Poley"
2023	Otta	"Ottaykkoru Mutham"
2024	Iyer In Arabia	"Thiruvananthapurame"
2024	Bougainvillea	"Maravikale"
2026	Bachelor Party D'eux	

== Awards ==
=== Literary awards ===
- Odakkuzhal Award for Rafeeq Ahammedinte Kavithakal (2014)
- Kerala Sahitya Akademi Award for Alamara (2006)
- Olappamanna Memorial Award for Paarayil Pathiinjathu (2000)
- Edappally Award
- Kunchupilla Award
- Kanakasree Award
- Vailoppilli Award
- P. Kunjiraman Nair Award (2017)
- Ulloor Award
- Swathi-Ayyappa Panicker Literary Award (2019)
- Padmaprabha Literary Award (2024)

=== Film awards ===
Year	Award	Movie	Notes	Ref.
2007	Kerala State Film Award for Best Lyricist	Pranayakalam		
2009	Kerala State Film Award for Best Lyricist	Sufi Paranja Katha		
2010	Kerala State Film Award for Best Lyricist	Sadgamaya		
2010	Filmfare Award for Best Lyricist – Malayalam	Anwar		
2010	Vanitha Film Awards for Best Lyrics	Anwar		
2012	Kerala State Film Award for Best Lyricist	Spirit		
2012	Amrita Film Award for Best Lyrics	Spirit		
2012	Filmfare Award for Best Lyricist – Malayalam	Spirit		
2012	Asianet Film Award for Best Lyrics	Ustad Hotel		
2012	Vanitha Film Awards for Best Lyrics	Spirit, Diamond Necklace		
2013	Amrita Film Award for Best Lyrics	Oru Indian Pranayakatha		
2014	Asianet Film Award for Best Lyrics	How old are you?		
2015	Kerala State Film Award for Best Lyricist	Ennu Ninte Moideen		
2015	Asianet Film Award for Best Lyrics	Ennu Ninte Moideen		
2015	Filmfare Award for Best Lyricist – Malayalam	Ennu Ninte Moideen		
2015	Vanitha Film Awards for Best Lyrics	Ennu Ninte Moideen		
2017	Asianet Film Award for Best Lyrics	Thondimuthalum Driksakshiyum, Munthirivallikal Thalirkkumbol		
2018	Vanitha Film Awards for Best Lyrics	Odiyan		
2019	Kerala Film Critics Association Awards for Best Lyrics	Syamaragam		
2022	Kerala State Film Award for Best Lyricist	Viddikalude Mash		
