= Of the People =

2008 film directed by Jayaraj

- Directed by: Jayaraj
- Written by: Sreekumar Sreyams
- Produced by: Jayaraj
- Starring: Arun; Padmakumar; Arjun; Harshan; Devipriya
- Cinematography: Tanu Balak
- Edited by: Manoj; Kevin
- Music by: Vinu M. Thomas
- Production company: New Generation Cinema
- Distributed by: Central Pictures
- Release date: 2008
- Country: India
- Language: Malayalam
- Budget: ₹ 1.50 crore

Of the People is a 2008 Indian Malayalam-language vigilante film directed and produced by Jayaraj. It is a sequel to 4 the People (2004) and By the People (2005). Arun, Padmakumar and Arjun are in the cast. The story was written by Jayaraj, while Sreekumar Sreyams wrote the screenplay.

== Synopsis ==
"4 The People" are released from jail and re-start what they had been doing earlier. Now an A.C.P. Harishanker (Harshan) joins their team as a police informer. But a new threat against "Of The People" is formed.

== Plot ==
Arvind Sebastian (Arun), Eshwar (Arjun Bose) and Shafeek (Padma Kumar) are released after completing their term in prison following the events in 4 the people. They are advised not to reform society but to begin new lives and make up for the lost time instead. However, they are unable to bear the sight of ever increasing corruption and end up forming a trio in hiding, named "Of the people", inspired by Che Guevara, with formation of a website for people to lodge complaints against corrupt officials, whom the trio thereafter kill, to set an example against corruption in society. A private college professor is soon targeted and killed when he demands extra fees from a student to approve her admission, after which the latter suicides. In comes ACP Harishankar, recommended by the chief minister to investigate the murders and nab the trio. But Harishankar, inspired by their deeds, decides to join the trio and help them by acting as an insider among the police.

The chief minister then gives orders to an IAS officer MaheshKumar and team to demolish illegal constructs at Munnar but soon rescinds his order when pressured by his party at behest of politician turned local king maker Nazer (Anoop). Mahesh and his team thereafter promise to help Harishankar in future before they depart. Nazer smuggles fake currency into the state and transport them via trucks, and the plan is revealed to Of the people, who then arrange for local supports to arrange for celebrations in which the truck drivers are distracted and the trio make away with the truck, thereafter immolating the fake notes causing crores of damage to Nazer. In comes Mani Sharma, a political prisoner released from jail and who gets beaten up during a rally for students by the police. When hospitalized, through journalist Nancy, Sharma contacts Of the people, who hesitatingly recruit him without openly revealing their whereabouts. Sharma is then shown to be an aide of corrupt inspector Rajashekaran who is hot on the trails of Of the people; his assault was dramatized to help him get into the gang.

Secretary Jithesh Kumar and the Mayor refuse to pass the bill for a contract by a Korean contactor Lee Huan to build highways in the state unless a huge bribe is paid and this is known to the trio via a microphone planted by Huan in a bouquet, soon after which Huan suicides, and the trio target and kill Jithesh and Mayor, almost failing at one attempt. The trio soon suspect that someone is informing the police about their plans and Rajashekaran and Sharma suspect that Harishankar is a mole as well, and keep track of his movements but to no avail. It is revealed that Nazer is working at behest of business tycoon Dixon Ebenezer based abroad, trying to spread chaos and turmoil in the state.

Ebenezer wants to usurp lands of tribals given to them by the government and retired Marxist Moscow Velayuthan is holding a hunger strike in protest. Ebenezer tries to convince him to sell his land, and kills him when he refuses. This is secretly recorded by Nancy who is working for Of the people, and she waits for an opportunity to telecast it, knowing that her channel CEO is hand in glove with Ebenezer. Nancy notices Sharma with Rajashekharan and tries to arrange for an urgent meeting with the trio but gets run over by a bike by Sharma who learns of her discovery. Harishankar investigates the murder and learns that Sharma is the mole and why he wants revenge. Rajashekharan spots him spying on confidential files and attacks him, but Harishankar kills Rajashekharan. He then proceeds to arrest Sharma and reveal his identity but is shot by Ebenezer.

Of the people and Sharma then ambush the Satellite truck of Ebenezer's upcoming TV channel to broadcast the tape of Velayuthan's murder but are double crossed by Sharma who locks them in the van. It is also revealed that Sharma's father, a doctor was a victim of the gang in 4 the people who amputated his hand for corruption and he is seeking revenge. He plants a time bomb and makes away to the venue where Ebenezer is inaugurating his new TV channel with the chief minister. Maheshkumar IAS and his team arrive to the rescue of Of the people; the bomb is diffused, and the trio use the satellite to broadcast the murder committed by Ebenezer just as he inaugurates his channel, much to the anger of the public watching. Maheshkumar arrives to arrest Ebenezer, Nazer and Sharma but they break away with Of the people chasing them. They try to fly out of Kerala but are stopped on the way by the trio, and a mob of young bikers, inspired by the trio, attack and run over them with their bikes, before making away into oblivion.

The film ends with footage of the common man reciting the Indian pledge.

== Cast ==
- Arun as Aravind Sebastian
- Padmakumar as Shefeek
- Arjun Bose as Iswar Iyer
- Harshan as A.C.P Harishankar
- Devipriya as Nancy Isaac
- Govind as Mani Sharmma
- Mahesh S as Mohana Swamy
- Kaimal as Rajindra Singh
- Biju as Mahesh Kumar
- Anoop as Nazer
- Sunil John as Dixon Ebenezer
- Jolly as Jithesh Kumar
- Sabitha Jayaraj as Sreelakshmi
- Govind Singh as Lee
- Sambsivan T.V as Moscow Velayudhan
- Vijayan Peringode as Mayor
