= Purbayan Chatterjee =

Indian musician

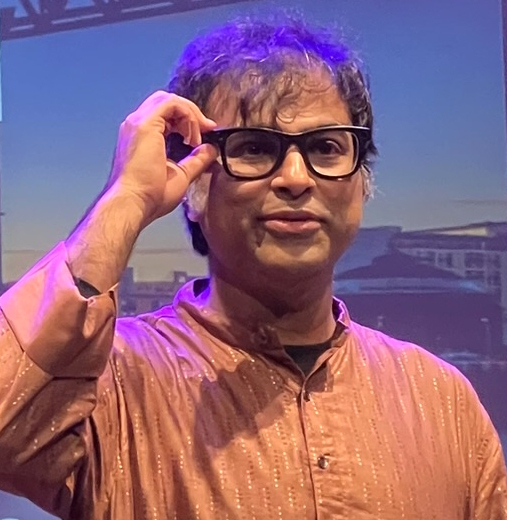
- Chatterjee in Glasgow, 2026
- Born: 12 September 1976 (age 49); Kolkata, West Bengal, India
- Spouses: Sanghita Chatterjee (m. 2002; div. 2013); Gayatri Asokan (m. 2016)
- Children: 1
- Musical career
- Genres: Hindustani classical music
- Instrument: Sitar
- Years active: 1988–present

Purbayan Chatterjee (born 12 September 1976) is an Indian sitar maestro who lives in Mumbai, India. He is noted for amalgamating traditional Indian classical music with contemporary world music genres.

== Early life and career ==
Purbayan Chatterjee learnt Sitar from his father Parthapratim Chatterjee. Purbayan’s music is inspired by the sound of Pt. Nikhil Banerjee. He has performed as a solo artist and as a part of the groups Shastriya Syndicate and Stringstruck. He is also a vocalist and has performed in duet with Shankar Mahadevan (Dwo - from the album Stringstruck).

He has worked with Shastriya Syndicate – the first Indian Classical Band – Indian Classical band with a contemporary touch, which has performed at the Roskilde Festival, Denmark, OzAsia Festival, Australia, Traumzeit Festival, Germany etc. The album "Lehar" released by Times Music in 2008 has remained a best-seller for a year and a half. Shankar Mahadevan has performed the title song "Dwo" in Purbayan’s super-hit fusion album, "Stringstruck" released by Times Music. The number has also been compiled in the album "Aman ki Asha", an Indo-Pak peace project released by Times Music and has also received the Palm IRAA Award for the Best World Music Album of the Year. He designed the "Dwo" which is a Doppelganger of the Indian Sitar. He has performed several times with tabla maestro Ustad Zakir Hussain.

In 2013, Chatterjee composed an anthem, Tomake Chai Bole Banchi (I live as I yearn for you), for the city of Kolkata, with Hindi and Bengali lyrics by Srijato and English lyrics by Bickram Ghosh, in an effort to make Kolkata the first city with an official anthem of its own.

== Awards ==
- Chatterjee was a recipient of the Rashtrapati Award for being the Best Instrumentalist of the country at the age of 15.
- He has also received the Aditya Vikram Birla Award for excellence and contributions to the field.
- He has also been honoured with the Rasoi Award by Rotary International in 1995.

== Discography ==
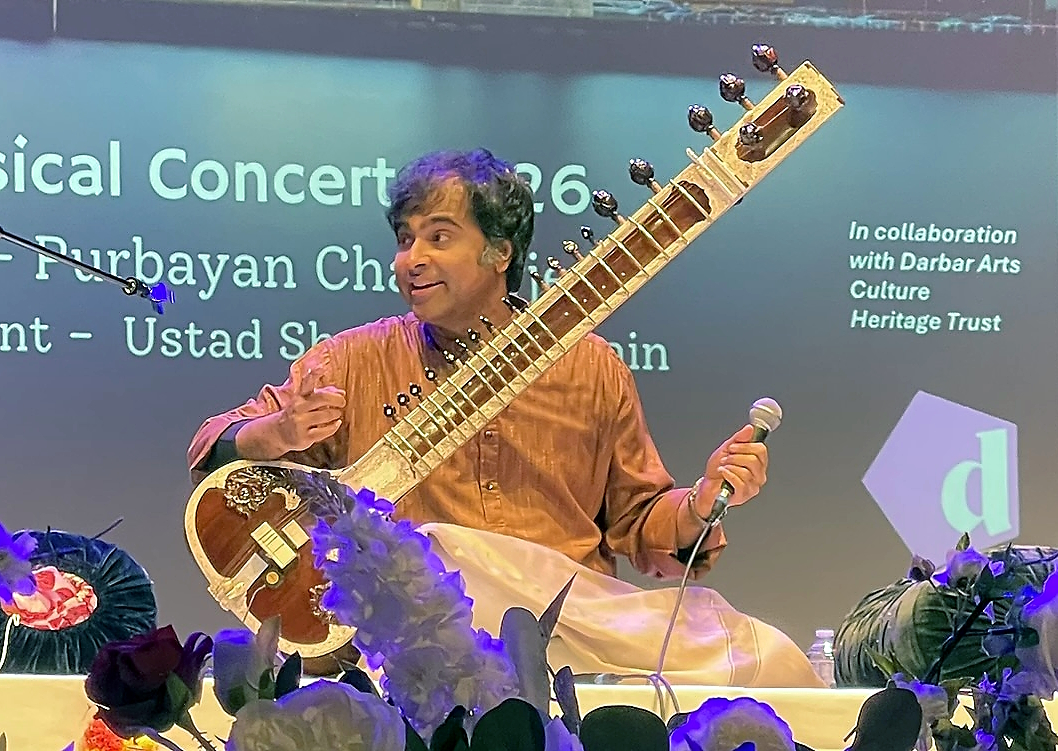
Chatterjee playing in Glasgow, 2026

- Horizon (1999) - by Peshkar Music Germany
- Nirman (2004) - By Sense World Music UK
- Samwad (2004) - By Sense World Music UK (duet with violinist Kala Ramnath) - Songlines World Music Magazine Top Of The World (Top ten)
- Rasayana (2005) - By Sense World Music UK (duet with flutist Shashank) - Songlines Top Of The World
- Aavishkar - By Sense World Music UK (duet with violinist Kala Ramnath) - Songlines Top Of The World
- Taalash (2006) - By Sense World Music UK
- Rising Stars Magical Fingers - by HMV
- Singing Sitar - by Virgin Records India
- Lehar (2008) - Times Music (Purbayan's group Shastriya syndicate - The First Indian Classical Band ) Top of the charts for 6 months (Planet M charts and rhythm house charts)
- Purbayan - Times Music with Pt Anindo Chatterjee tabla
- Stringstruck (2009) - Times Music - Awarded Best World Music Album at Iraa Palm Expo 2009 - featuring Shankar Mahadevan, Taufiq Qureshi, Rakesh Chaurasia, Atul Raninga
- Sitarscape (2012) - EMI Virgin
- Hemisphere - Times Music
- Saath Saath (2022) - Purbayan Chatterjee & Rakesh Chaurasia (bansuri)

The album Lehar released by Times Music in 2008 has remained the bestseller for a year and a half.

Shankar Mahadevan has performed the title song Dwo in Chatterjee's fusion album Stringstruck, released by Times Music. The number has also been compiled in the album Aman ki Asha, an Indo-Pak peace project released by Times Music and has also received the Palm IRAA Award for the Best World Music Album of the Year.
