= Aashayein =

2010 film by Nagesh Kukunoor

- Film poster
- Directed by: Nagesh Kukunoor
- Written by: Nagesh Kukunoor
- Produced by: Shailendra Singh
- Starring: John Abraham; Sonal Sehgal; Prateeksha Lonkar; Girish Karnad; Farida Jalal; Ashwin Chitale; Anaitha Nair
- Cinematography: Sudeep Chatterjee
- Edited by: Apurva Asrani
- Music by: Pritam; Shiraz Uppal; Salim–Sulaiman
- Production company: Percept Picture Company
- Distributed by: Reliance Entertainment; T-Series
- Release date: 27 August 2010
- Country: India
- Language: Hindi
- Box office: ₹22.0 million (US$230,000)

Aashayein (Hindi pronunciation: [ɑː.ʃɑːẽː]; transl. Hopes) is a 2010 Indian Hindi-language drama film written and directed by Nagesh Kukunoor, and produced by Percept Picture Company and T-Series. It stars John Abraham and Sonal Sehgal. The film revolves around Rahul, a gambler whose life changes one day when he is diagnosed with cancer but is given the hope of living his life to the fullest by several patients he meets at a rehabilitation center. The film was released theatrically on 27 August 2010.

== Plot ==
Rahul Sharma (John Abraham) is a compulsive gambler and, while betting, wins 30 million rupees. That night he asks his girlfriend, Nafisa (Sonal Sehgal), to marry him, and she agrees. Right after this, Rahul collapses.

The next day he goes to the doctor for a medical test and finds out that he has cancer. Rahul does not know how to handle this situation; in the middle of the night, he runs down a street screaming, knowing that he only has months to live. That night, he finds a piece of newspaper in which he sees an advertisement for a rehabilitation centre for persons with such incurable diseases to spend the last days of their lives in it. Rahul runs away from his fiancée, leaving most of the money he earned for her.

Once Rahul gets into the centre, he meets several people like Parthasarthi (Girish Karnad), who speaks with the help of an electrolarynx because of his cancer; Madhu (Farida Jalal), who was a prostitute and an AIDS patient now; Padma (Anaitha Nair), a teenage girl with a lot of dreams but no life to fulfill them – she can't even walk properly; and Govinda (Ashwin Chitale), a comic-loving kid, who is said to have certain higher capabilities, and everybody treats him as a messenger of God. The relationship between Rahul and each of these people grows with time.

One day Rahul coughs hard and struggles for breath, and he goes to Govinda's room and falls down there. The next day, when Rahul wakes up, Govinda offers him mangoes, and he tells him a story. The story was similar to the story of Rahul's dreams, in which he imagines himself as Indiana Jones. In the story, he is on a mission to find his lost whip, which is locked in a box in the palace of death. To find the key to that box, he needs to make free many souls who are in chains. Rahul imagines himself to be Indiana Jones, and Parthasarathy, Madhu, etc. as the locked spirits, and Padma as a spirit who motivates Rahul to find the key.

Later, he realises that the key to opening all the locks of spirits is his heart and his love. He then arranges a beach program with Padma, during which he brings a band that sings about living in the present. Prominent actor Shreyas Talpade appears as the lead singer in this song. Rahul asks everybody to write down their one wish and put it in a pot. Then he and Padma exchange their wishes. They form the Wish Fairy Club and fulfill everybody's wishes.

Rahul and Padma were about to be in a physical relationship, but Rahul resists. Padma gets angry and throws off her wig to Rahul; she is bald due to her disease. Padma's condition gets worse, and Rahul looks for her wish pot. He finds that her last wish is to make love with Rahul. Rahul agrees and kisses Padma, and she dies at the moment.

Rahul finds an Indiana Jones costume and a whip in the Wish Fairy Club closet, which he had wished for and given by Padma. Rahul's condition gets worse, and Nafisa re-enters the story. It is revealed that Padma had called Nafisa before her death and asked her to take care of Rahul. Meanwhile, Govinda tells the further story to Rahul, and Rahul desperately begins to search for a map that will lead him to a waterfall to cure his cancer. He then realises that the waterfall is near a resort in the Himalayas, which was once the biggest dream of Rahul.

The closing scene of the movie shows Rahul and Nafisa leaving the rehabilitation centre. They are going on a journey to that resort to drink water from that waterfall, which will cure Rahul's cancer.

== Cast ==
- John Abraham as Rahul Sharma – An angry and confused compulsive gambler. Wishes to live the life he has been dreaming of
- Sonal Sehgal as Nafisa – Doting, loving, loyal girlfriend. Wishes that love always wins.
- Anaitha Nair as Padma – She is impetuous, obnoxious, full of life. Wishes to experience love.
- Prateeksha Lonkar as Sister Grace – She will bend her principles for the greater good. Wishes to dedicate her life for the happiness of her inmates.
- Girish Karnad as Parthasarthi – Fun loving, "uncle" to everyone, stupidly stubborn on his principles. Wishes to be reunited with his family.
- Farida Jalal as Madhu – Intelligent, virtuous, loving. Wishes to just lead a normal life and not be ostracised.
- Ashwin Chitale as Govinda – Ten years old, loves comics, mangoes and tells stories. Wishes that everyone's life be just like a comic book.
- Vikram Inamdar as Xavier
- Sonali Sachdev as Doctor (at clinic)
- Sharad Wagh as Priest
- Shreyas Talpade as the lead singer of a band (special appearance).
- Vijay Raghavn (special appearance).

== Production ==
Aashayein was shot on locations in Puducherry and Hyderabad, India. John Abraham had to lose 16 kilos for the film. The title is inspired by the song "Aashayein" from Nagesh Kukunoor directed film Iqbal.

== Track list ==
Aashayein

Soundtrack album by Pritam Salim–Sulaiman Shiraz Uppal
- Released: 25 July 2010
- Genre: Film soundtrack
- Length: 58:24
- Label: T-Series

Pritam chronology
Once Upon a Time in Mumbaai (2010)	Aashayein (2010)	Hello Darling (2010)

The soundtrack album was released on 25 July 2010.

No.	Title	Lyrics	Music	Singer(s)	Length
1.	"Mera Jeena Hai Kya"	Sameer	Pritam	Neeraj Shridhar	5:53
2.	"Dilkash Dildaar Duniya"	Kumaar	Pritam	Shaan, Tulsi Kumar	3:55
3.	"Rabba"	Shakeel Sohail	Shiraz Uppal	Shiraz Uppal	4:30
4.	"Ab Mujhko Jeena"	Mir Ali Husain	Salim–Sulaiman	Zubeen Garg	5:15
5.	"Shukriya Zindagi"	Mir Ali Husain	Salim–Sulaiman	Shafqat Amanat Ali	4:22
6.	"Pal Main Mila Jahan"	Mir Ali Husain	Salim–Sulaiman	Shreya Ghoshal	5:29
7.	"Chala Aaya Pyaar"	Mir Ali Husain	Salim–Sulaiman	Mohit Chauhan	5:18
8.	"Pal Main Mila Jahan"	Mir Ali Husain	Salim–Sulaiman	Shankar Mahadevan	5:30
9.	"Mera Jeena Hai Kya" (Remix)	Sameer	Pritam	Neeraj Shridhar	6:36
10.	"Ab Mujhko Jeena" (Remix)	Mir Ali Husain	Salim–Sulaiman	Zubeen Garg, Samishka Chandra	4:28
11.	"Shukriya Zindagi" (Remix)	Mir Ali Husain	Salim–Sulaiman	Shafqat Amanat Ali	4:29
12.	"Dilkash Dildaar Duniya" (Remix)	Kumaar	Pritam	Shaan, Tulsi Kumar	3:34
13.	"Shukriya Zindagi" (Sad Version)	Mir Ali Husain	Salim–Sulaiman	Shafqat Amanat Ali	1:50

== Critical reception ==
IANS rated the film 3.5 out of 5 saying, "This is unarguably Kukunoor’s most sensitive and moving work since "Iqbal". It touches the heart". Rajeev Masand of IBN gave 1.5/5 and commented, "Aashayein is a difficult film to sit through (...) it is in fact a serious test of your patience." Noyon Jyoti Parasara of AOL rated the film 2 out of 5 and said, "...nothing comes through except disappointment.".

== Accolades ==
Award Ceremony	Category	Recipient	Result	Ref.(s)
3rd Mirchi Music Awards	Upcoming Music Composer of The Year	Shiraz Uppal – "Rabba"	Won	
3rd Mirchi Music Awards	Upcoming Lyricist of The Year	Shakeel Sohail – "Rabba"	Nominated	
