= By the People (2005 film) =

2005 film directed by Jayaraj

- DVD cover
- Directed by: Jayaraj
- Screenplay by: Sunil Parameswaran
- Produced by: Sabu Cherian
- Starring: Narain
- Cinematography: Rajavel Mohan
- Edited by: Anthony
- Music by: Pravin Mani
- Production company: Ananda Bhairavi
- Distributed by: Galaxy Films
- Release date: 12 August 2005
- Country: India
- Language: Malayalam

By The People is a 2005 Indian Malayalam-language vigilante thriller film directed by Jayaraj and produced by Milan Jaleel under his banner Galaxy Films. It is the sequel of 4 the People (2004) and the prequel of Of the People (2008). Narain reprises his role from the original. The film marks the debut of Surabhi Lakshmi.

== Plot ==
Two years after the events in 4 the People, Rajan Mathew (Narain) is working an administrative job after being transferred for killing Vivek among the four-member group, and the remaining three members- Arvind Sebastian (Arun), Eshwar (Arjun Bose) and Shafeek (Padma Kumar) are imprisoned. College students in a band named Pulse, including a porter Sudhakaran (Vinayakan), auto driver Sathyan (Sreejith Ravi) and a one leg cripple (J Kutty), inspired by the four, form a more aggressive team to fight corruption by resorting to killing corrupt individuals, their group being named "By the people". Angered by the suicide of a student who is mocked and refused a loan for her studies, they eventually kill the corrupt bank manager who abetted it. Soon enough, more corrupt individuals are killed, and Rajan Mathew is reinstated as S.P. to nab the group. The team learn about Rajan's reinstatement, and decide to kidnap him, building trust with his wife through their ally Kamini (Surabhi Lakshmi).

Rajan's investigation leads him to a powerful kingmaker and minister Paramasivam (Vincent Asokan) who controls the media and political parties. Rajan videotapes conversations between Paramasivam, godman Harihar ji and other tycoons to expose them. But his superiors being corrupt, he is sold out, and soon is attacked for the videotape, his pregnant wife is murdered, and Rajan is crippled, with the videotape lost. He is transferred and posted as Jail Superintendent at the prison where the other three members of his team are incarcerated. Rajan realises that the system is corrupt and his own superiors betrayed him.

Four students lead an attack on Paramasivam at his vacation house, with the idea of bombing it when he arrives, but they are trapped and get killed. Rajan learns of this, and soon joins hands with 'By the people' as their prime advisor, to fight corruption and avenge themselves. The first victim is inspector Thomas, Rajan's corrupt superior, who is killed when a roller coaster he inaugurates goes off track, which was rigged by the team.

Then comes investigating officer Balan Nambiar, who soon arrives at the doors of 'By the people', following the clues left by trails of their deeds, but with no evidence against them. He figures that the next victims will be Hariharji and Paramasivam, and tries to protect them. Soon enough, Hariharji is killed by the team at a resort. Rajan's video tape is incidentally found by a Junkyard owner, who hands it over to the media. It is publicized, but not accepted by court as evidence and Paramasivam is acquitted.

The team then plots to eliminate Paramasivam at a rally, in a staged manner with backup from everyone. Kamini is nabbed while trying to bomb the minister, followed by the cripple, Sathyan, Sudhakaran and others who are either shot or nabbed by Balan. Despite warning, Paramasivam continues with the rally till it reaches a Portugal cultural festival event. Rajan then hurriedly releases the incarcerated '4 the people team', who arrive incognito at the venue and assassinate Paramasivam point blank and break away. Balan pursues them but finds them lodged behind bars, with no evidence that they had ever left the cells.As he leaves, he commends Rajan for his clever tactics in annihilating the members of the caucus by leaving no trace of the act, bidding him 'Hasta la vista', the punch line of the band Pulse.

== Cast ==
- Narain as Commisonner Rajan Mathew IPS
- Mangala as Malli Makam
- Sreejith Ravi as Sathyan
- Vinayakan as Sudhakaran
- J Kutty as Pulse, By the people team member
- Satheesh Poduval as Balan Nambiar
- Surabhi Lakshmi as Kamini
- Vincent Asokan as Paramasivam
- Krishnan Potti as Hariharji
- Kaithapram Santhosh as By the people team member
- Samad as By the people team member
- Nishchal as By the people team member
- Binoy as By the people team member
- Arun as Aravind Sebastian (Cameo)
- Arjun Bose as Eeswar Iyyer (Cameo)
- Padmakumar as Shafeek (Cameo)

Cameo appearances as themselves in the songs "Rock Me" and "Oh Laila Oh Majnu"

- Benny Dayal
- Anaitha Nair
- Suvi Suresh
- Arjun Sasi
- Bhargavi Pillai

== Production ==
After the success of 4 the People, Jayaraj started work on this film. Actor Narain was cast in the lead.

== Soundtrack ==
The music is by Pravin Mani and all the songs have been sung by and featured on Tamil pop band S5, comprising Anaitha Nair, Benny Dayal, Suvi Suresh, Bhargavi Pillai and Arjun Sashi. The Tamil hit single "Malarey" and "Rock Me" from their album Isai were reused as Malayalam songs.

All lyrics are written by Kaithapram Damodaran Namboothiri.

Track listing
| No. | Title | Singer(s) | Length |
|---|---|---|---|
| 1. | "Asthala Vistha" | Benny Dayal, Bhargavi Pillai, Anaitha Nair | 5:23 |
| 2. | "Malare" | Suvi Suresh, Benny Dayal, Bhargavi Pillai, Arjun Sasi, Anaitha Nair | 3:51 |
| 3. | "Malare" (Extended) | Suvi Suresh, Benny Dayal, Bhargavi Pillai, Arjun Sasi, Anaitha Nair | 9:40 |
| 4. | "Na Na Na" | Bhargavi Pillai, Anaitha Nair, Shweta Mohan | 3:46 |
| 5. | "Oh Laila Oh Majnu" | Bhargavi Pillai, Anaitha Nair, Shweta Mohan | 3:55 |
| 6. | "Rock Me" | Bhargavi Pillai, Benny Dayal, Anaitha Nair | 4:39 |
| 7. | "Vasco Da Gama" | Benny Dayal, Bhargavi Pillai, Anaitha Nair | 4:04 |
| Total length: | | | 35:18 |

== Box office ==
The film was a box office failure and the director's fourth consecutive failure. The film's failure is attributed to Jayaraj "half-heartedly" trying to "rework" the "magic" of 4 the People with this film. Jayaraj called the film a "failed experiment".

== Sequel ==
A sequel titled Of the People was released in 2008 , with Arun, Arjun Bose and Padma Kumar reprising their roles
