= Marottichal =

Marottichal Waterfalls
- Tourist destination (Restricted)
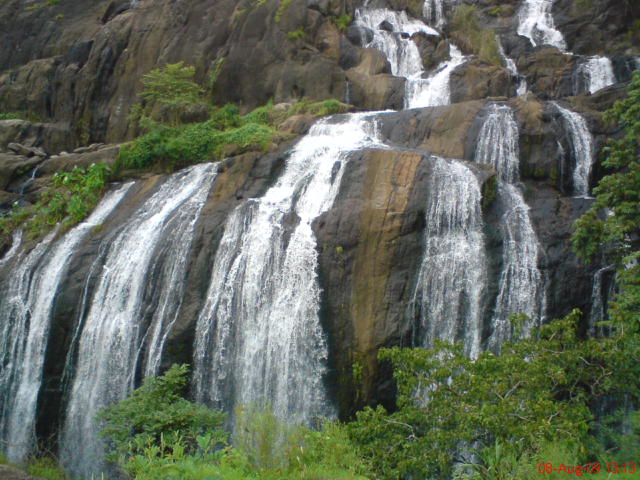
- Interactive map of Marottichal Waterfalls
- Coordinates: 10°47′9″N 76°34′9″E
- Country: India
- State: Kerala
- District: Thrissur

Government
  - Type: Panchayat
  - Body: Puthoor

Languages
  - Official: Malayalam, English
- Time zone: UTC+5:30 (IST)
- PIN: 680014
- Vehicle registration: KL-08
- Nearest city: Marottichal, Pudukad

Marottichal Waterfalls is a popular tourist attraction located in Puthoor Panchayat in Thrissur district of Kerala.

Marottichal is about 20 km away from Thrissur town. There are two popular waterfalls in this area, one is named as Olakkayam Waterfalls and the other as Ilanjippara Waterfalls. Olakkayam Waterfalls is about 300-400 meters from the main road. Ilanjippara Waterfall is about four kilometers away from Illankippara Waterfalls.

Ilanjippara Waterfall, being the main waterfall is situated inside Reserve Forest and the entry to this waterfall is currently restricted by Kerala Forest Department. Any unauthorized entry will attract imprisonment of 1 to 30 years and a fine of up to ₹500 million.

== Chess in Marottichal ==
The village of Marottichal is famous for its obsession with the game of chess. On 18 May 2017, the BBC's travel section featured an article on how the game has transformed the village, which was once rife with illicit gambling and alcoholism. A movie by the name of August Club has also been made on the villagers’ obsession for chess. In an effort to be gambling and alcohol-free, the locals sought help from excise officials by persuading them to raid their village and shut down the illegal brewing. This move didn’t help much as the real problem for the villagers was how to cope with addiction. To help them do so, C. Unnikrishnan, who runs his own restaurant in the village, introduced the villagers to the black-and-white board game, chess.
