= Khaddama =

2011 film by Kamal

- Theatrical release poster
- Directed by: Kamal
- Screenplay by: K. Girishkumar; Kamal
- Story by: K. U. Iqbal
- Produced by: P. V. Pradeep
- Starring: Kavya Madhavan; Sreenivasan; Biju Menon; Murali Gopy; Shine Tom Chacko; Suraj Venjaramoodu
- Cinematography: Manoj Pillai
- Edited by: K. Rajagopal
- Music by: Score: M. Jayachandran; Songs: Bennet Veetraag
- Production company: Anitha Productions
- Distributed by: Murali Films
- Release date: 4 February 2011
- Country: India
- Language: Malayalam

Khaddama (transl. Housemaid) is a 2011 Indian Malayalam-language survival drama film co-written and directed by Kamal. It stars Kavya Madhavan in the lead role and was produced by P. V. Pradeep under the banner of Anitha Productions. The film features songs composed by Bennet Veetraag and the background music by M. Jayachandran.

The title of the film is a colloquial version of the Arabic word Khadima (Arabic: خادمة "servant"). The film narrates the story of some immigrants in the Persian Gulf region through the life of a housemaid in Saudi Arabia. It is scripted by K. Girishkumar and Kamal and the story is based on a feature by K. U. Iqbal, published in Bhashaposhini, depicting the real–life incidents of a Kerala–born housemaid in Arabia. Principal photography for the film began in October 2010 and took place mainly in the Middle East. After a special screening in the last week of January, the film made its theatrical debut in Kerala on 4 February 2011. The film's release was banned across the Middle East.

The film was well received by film critics, with most of them applauding it as a realistic film, while the performance of Kavya Madhavan has been rated as one of the best in her career.

The movie was dubbed in to Tamil as "Palaivana Roja".

== Plot ==
Razak Kottekkad is a migrant social worker, who owns a supermarket in Saudi Arabia. He makes an effort to both identify "unknown Indians" whose bodies arrive at the mortuary and to secure their return home.

Aswathi Chandrasekharan is a lower middle-class Malayali woman from Pattambi, Kerala. She marries a thug named Radhakrishnan who confesses to her about his premarital life and assures a complete change. Unfortunately, after a short period of happy life, he dies due to drowning. Due to the financial constraints of her family and the untimely death of her husband, Aswathi is forced to be the bread earner of the house and opts to go to the Persian Gulf. Usman, who is the car driver of an Arab family, belongs to Aswathi's village and he arranges the visa for Aswathi and brings her to Saudi Arabia. After she lands in Saudi Arabia, she is forced to wear a burqa at all times, due to the strict dress code of the country. She is subsequently exposed to a slavery-like vocation and is taken up under a sponsor to work for him as a maid. Aswathi had to face numerous troubles – sexual abuse and battery in her sponsor's house. Aswathi is accompanied by Usman, who actually brought her to all the miseries. However, he indulges in a sexual affair with an Indonesian maid Fathma there and gets caught and is kicked out of the sponsor's house. Aswathi helps the other maid to escape the premises and in turn is tortured as punishment.

The story follows Razak, who tries to trace Aswathi who had disappeared while escaping torture. Aswathi runs into people good and bad, eventually culminating in a deportation. After facing much trouble, she reaches Razak, who was actually looking for her. He inquires about her complete story and eventually helps Aswathi head back home to Kerala.

== Cast ==
- Kavya Madhavan as Aswathi Chandrasekharan
- Sreenivasan as Razak Kottekkad
- Biju Menon as Radhakrishnan, Aswathi's husband
- Murali Gopy as Bharathan, the truck driver
- Suraj Venjaramoodu as Usman
- Jaffar Idukki as Varghese, Razak's friend
- Lena as Sareena, Razak's wife
- K. P. A. C. Lalitha as Ashwathi's mother
- Sukumari as Razak's mother
- Shine Tom Chacko as Basheer, Bharathan's friend
- K. T. C. Abdullah as Hamsa
- Abigail de Jong as Fatma, the Indonesian maid
- Manu Jose
- Sasi Kalinga as Chaandu Maash
- K.K. Moideen Koya as Hameed
- Khaamiz. S. Mohammed as Nawaf Ahmed Bin Khalid Mohammed, the sponsor
- Ali Khamees as Khalid Ahmed Bin Said Mohammed
- Mariam Sulthan as the sponsor's mother
- Hala Al Sayed as Sameera
- Ahmed Saleh as the sponsor's son
- Ali Adnan Althuki as Badar
- Tehani Ali Mohammed as Sana

== Development ==
=== Writing ===
Saudi–based journalist K. U. Iqbal wrote an article which was published in Bhashaposhini Varshika Pathippu 2010. The report was based on the abuse and mistreatment of Khaddamas ("housemaids") in Saudi Arabia and was particularly inspired by the true life incidents of a maid servant named Subaida. It was a small news item published in Malayalam News (a Malayalam daily published in the Persian Gulf area) in 2002 — Subaida Vilikkunnu, which forms the seed of the reportage. Iqbal says he is used to getting calls from Indians in deportation camps on a daily basis, but somehow it was the call from Subaida which struck a chord in him and he followed it up. Years later the Bhashaposhini editor-in-charge, K. C. Narayanan, asked Iqbal to do an article for its anniversary edition. Iqbal narrated several of his Gulf stories to him but it was the story of Subaida which appealed to the editor.

Kamal, who was inspired by the thematic significance and dramatic value of the story, immediately picked it up for his next film. He had already directed the Gulf-centric Perumazhakkalam, which depicted the story of a young man facing death penalty in the Gulf. Kamal said: "The series that appeared in Bhashaposhini caught my attention and I thought the theme had immense potential for a feature film. Although Malayalam cinema has handled Gulf-centric themes before, this had a unique perspective as it is centred on a woman. Our previous Gulf narratives mostly revolve around men, money and memories of homeland. This, I thought, was a marked deviation from that. Hence the decision to make it into a film"

Kamal hired K. Girishkumar to co-write the screenplay. Girishkumar's earlier works were mostly family dramas, such as Veruthe Oru Bharya, Kana Kanmani and Amrutham. Kamal and Girishkumar have included several real-life characters and incidents as Girishkumar says: "Many of the incidents captured in the film are taken from real-life incidents. Only the structure of the story is fictional, the rest of it has been picked up from various individual experiences." According to Kamal, more than 90 per cent of the film is captured from real life.

=== Casting and principal photography ===
The central character Aswathi is played by Kavya Madhavan. Her previous association with Kamal was in Perumazhakkalam, which won her a Kerala State Film Award for Best Actress, public appreciations and critical praise. She was also introduced to films by Kamal as a child artist in Pookkalam Varavayi and Azhakiya Ravanan. Khaddama also marks her comeback to Malayalam cinema after she took a break from films for sometime, only recently returning. The film also marks her first screen appearance after the official divorce from Nishal. According to Girishkumar, Kamal had no other choice for the protagonist of the film. He says: "Kavya was the first and obvious choice for the film. Even before the idea germinated into the story, she was decided as the protagonist." Kavya signed the project after soon after completing Priyanandanan's Bhakthajanangalude Sradhakku. According to Kavya, it is one of the best characters she has ever got. She says: "I was really moved when Kamal sir narrated the story, which will be an eye-opener to many women in south India with dreams of living in the Persian Gulf. Aswathi is one of the best characters that I've ever done."

The other roles are played by Sreenivasan, Biju Menon, Suraj Venjaramood, Jaffer Idukki, Murali Gopy, Lena, K. P. A. C. Lalitha and Sukumari. Sreenivasan's character of a social worker (named Razak Kottekkad) has been heavily influenced by the real-life character named Shihab. Suraj Venjaramoodu, known for his comic roles, plays a negative character in the film. Several theatre artists from Indonesia, Iran, Saudi Arabia and Egypt are featured in the film. Shine Tom, who plays Basheer, has also served as an assistant director for the film.

The film was launched in October 2010 with its pre-shooting blessing held in Kochi, filming began on 20 October in Dubai. Almost 90% of the film was shot in Dubai and other parts of United Arab Emirates, while the remaining parts were filmed in Ottappalam, Kerala. Though the film is set in Saudi Arabia it was not filmed there. Kamal had visited several labour camps in Saudi Arabia and had gathered information from a jail personnel to know more about the life of the people there. He also spoke to many Khaddamas who returned to Kerala. Kamal argues that his research made the film more realistic and convincing. Manoj Pillai, who has been an assistant of Santosh Sivan, an independent cinematographer for a few Malayalam films was the cameraman. Manoj Pillai says: "The desert is a difficult terrain to work on. It was stressful, but we managed it. And the footage looks nice. It is a testimony of the fantastic crew that we add"

The central character, Aswathi, appears in a black Pardah in major parts of the film. The costumes have been designed by Anil Kumar, while Pandiyan did the make up. Shafeer Sait, who has a longtime association with Kamal, is the production controller. Suresh Kollam is the art director. Tapas Nayak, who was an assistant of H. Sridhar, completed the sound design.

=== Post-production ===
The film retains the title of K. U. Iqbal's feature published in Bhashaposhini. "Khaddama" (often spelt "Gaddama" or "Gadhama") is a colloquial version of the Arabic word Khadima (Arabic: خادمة "servant"). The name is generally used to address domestic workers in Arabian countries who come from other countries. Most of them are from North African countries, the Philippines and Sri Lanka. Indians are comparatively few, but most are from the Malabar region.

Kamal organised a special screening of the film in the first week of January. The screening was attended by several industry people including actresses Manju Warrier and Samyuktha Varma. The preview was held at D.L.S. theatre, Kakkanad, Kochi. The film received positive responses among those who attended the preview. After the show it was reported that, "Kavya was brilliant as the harassed Indian maid working in an Arab household".

== Release and reception ==
The film was distributed by Murali Films. It had a limited release in about thirty theatres in Kerala on 4 February 2011. The film was anticipated among both critics and cinema-goers, not only because of its theme but also due to the wide marketing strategy. It was the only Malayalam film released on the date and hence had no significant competition.

Even though the film had a limited release it became a box office winner. The film's fiftieth day celebration was held at the Avenue Centre, Kochi on 27 March. The function was attended by film directors Joshiy and Sibi Malayil, producers Siyad Koker, Swargachitra Appachan and Vyshakh Rajan, writer P. Sukumar, and politician V. M. Sudheeran, along with the cast and crew of the film. During the function V. M. Sudheeran opined that Khaddama was one of the best films of recent times and that he had congratulated Kamal for the bold movie soon after watching it.

=== Controversy ===
The film was to be released in the Middle East on the same day, a big market for Malayalam films, but it was banned across the Middle East as the Censor Board rejected the film.

=== Critical response ===
The film received generally favorable critical reviews and some applauded Khaddama as a realistic film. Kavya Madhavan's lead performance has been rated as one of the best in her career.

M. Ashitha of Deccan Herald said, "Director Kamal makes convincing depiction of the obscure fate of poor Indian women in an alien land. Kavya excels in her role. Manoj Pillai's outstanding camerawork makes the film realistic."

S. Anandan of The Hindu commented, "Kamal's movie, on its part, attempts to catalogue the society's brutality meted out to Gulf Malayalees. The movie is a decent depiction of lives in exile in the Middle East. However, going by the accounts of Gulf deportees, what is shown is just the tip of the iceberg insofar as the agonies of the diasporic workers in the Persian Gulf are concerned. Khaddama would have evoked a better response had its narrative been a little nuanced and punctuated with dark humour."

Paresh C. Palicha of Rediff.com gave the film three out of five stars, saying "Khaddama is one example where he [Kamal] deals with a subject that requires realistic treatment and he has come up on top."

The reviewer of Sify.com gave the film a verdict of 'Above Average' and stated, "Khaddama handles a different issue and it is indeed one that needs grave attention as well."

Nikhil Narayanan of Oneindia.in stated, "If you are unhappy with the lack of women-centric themes in Malayalam cinema, here's a reprieve. This movie belongs to Kavya Madhavan, who has brilliantly delivered the role portraying the hardships of a Malayalee maid in a Sheikh's house in Saudi Arabia."

The reviewer of Asianet said, "All in all, 'Khaddama' is a quality offering from the master director, with a genuine upsetting story. The movie has plenty of faces that continue to haunt you even after the film has ended. This is a film for the discerning viewer who likes to go a little beyond the regular masala stereotype."

=== Accolades ===
The film has received various awards and nominations. In the 2011 Kerala Film Critics Awards it became the biggest winner, with three awards for Best Film, Best Director and Best Actress. The film was selected as one of the six Malayalam films to compete for the National Film Awards. Kavya Madhavan was in the final round in the Best Actress category, but she lost to Mitalee Jagtap Varadkar and Saranya Ponvannan. She won the Best Actress Award at the 2011 Kerala State Film Awards and Amrita-FEFKA Film Awards. Gaddhama was screened in the Malayalam Cinema Today section at the 16th International Film Festival of Kerala (IFFK), in Thiruvananthapuram, Kerala in 2011.

1st South Indian International Movie Awards

- Best Actress – Kavya Madhavan

Thikkurissy Foundation Awards (2012)

- Best Actress – Kavya Madhavan
- Best Female Playback Singer – K. S. Chithra
- Best Male Playback Singer – Karthik
- Best Lyricist – Rafeeq Ahamed

Kerala state film award 2011 Best actress – Kavya Madhavan
Asianet Film Award 2011 Best actress – Kavya Madhavan
59th Filmfare Awards South

- Best Actress – Kavya Madhavan
- Nominated National film award for Best Actress- Kavya Madhavan

=== Accusation of plagiarism ===
A controversy regarding the film's plot originated when Kozhikode-based writer Salim Kurukkalakath claimed that the main story of the film was plagiarised from his story published in Madhyamam weekly on 20 October 2000. Salim says he had written the story while he was working in the Gulf and alleges that though he had written to Kamal on the issue in the initial stages of film making itself, Kamal had not replied. "It became clear after I saw the film", he says."

== Music and soundtrack ==
Khaddama

Soundtrack album by Bennet Veetraag
- Released: 2011
- Genre: Feature film soundtrack
- Label: Satyam Audios
- Producer: P. V. Pradeep

Bennet Veetraag chronology
Dr. Patient (2009)	Khaddama (2011)

The film's background score has been composed by M. Jayachandran, collaborating with Kamal for the first time after Perumazhakkalam. The songs are composed by the duo Bennet Veetraag and feature lyrics by noted poet Rafeeque Ahammed.

The soundtrack album, released on Satyam Audios, contains five songs. Out of the five songs only two, "Naattuvazhiyorathe" and "Vidhuramee", are featured in the film as the track "Ariyumo" was a promotional song. The soundtrack received critical praise, particularly for the melody in the tracks.

Track listing
No.	Title	Artist(s)	Length
1.	"Naattuvazhiyorathe"	Chithra & Vijay Yesudas	5:19
2.	"Ariyumo"	Karthik	4:52
3.	"Vidhuramee"	Shreya Ghoshal & Hariharan	5:21
4.	"Naattuvazhi"	Chithra	5:19
5.	"Vidhuramee Yathra"	Hariharan	5:21
Total length:			26:22

== See also ==
- The Goat Life: a similar film of a migrant worker getting enslaved based on the life of Najeeb.
