= Anaitha Nair =

Indian actress

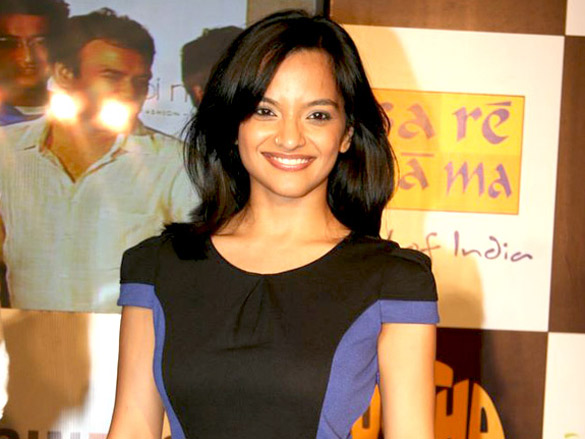
- Nair in 2012
- Born: 19 July 1984 (age 42); Bangalore, Karnataka
- Occupation: Actress
- Years active: 2005–2011
- Children: 1

Anaitha Nair (born 19 July 1984) is an Indian film and theatre actress and singer, best known for playing the role of Aliya Bose, a member of the Indian women's national hockey team, in the sports-oriented film Chak De India (2007), starring Shahrukh Khan.

== Career ==
She was born in Bangalore to a Malayali father and a Parsi mother. She did her schooling at The Frank Anthony Public School, Bengaluru, studied at the Bangalore University and moved to Mumbai, after completing her education. She shot to fame after she played the role of Aliya Bose, a member of the Indian women's national hockey team, in the sports-oriented film Chak De India (2007). She has also appeared in two Malayalam films, By the People (2005) and IG (2009). She had also acted in number of TV commercials notably in Virgin Mobile with Ranbir Kapoor, Dairy Milk Silk, Acer, Dove, Medical Abortion Pills, and Nescafe.

She also played Bindiya in the British-Indian comedy series Mumbai Calling. Her second release in Hindi was Shyam Benegal's Well Done Abba (2010). Nair also starred in Aashayein directed by Nagesh Kukunoor, in which she played a cancer patient. For the character, she also tonsured her head. She was part of the cast in Abbas Tyrewalla's Jhootha Hi Sahi and Rohan Sippy's Dum Maaro Dum. Her most recent releases are Ekaant directed by Sunil Pillai, and Force directed by Nishikant Kamat.

Apart from acting, Nair was also part of a band named S5 and released the album Isai with Sony-BMG.

== Filmography ==
Year	Film	Role	Language	Notes
2005	By the People	Herself	Malayalam	Special appearance in the songs "Rock Me" and "Oh Laila Oh Majnu"; Also playback singer for all songs
2007	Chak De! India	Aliya Bose	Hindi	
2008	Mumbai Calling	Bindiya	English	
2009	IG	Chandini	Malayalam	
2010	Well Done Abba	Sakina	Hindi	
2010	Aashayein	Padma	Hindi	
2010	Jhootha Hi Sahi	Sushi	Hindi	
2011	Dum Maaro Dum	Taani	Hindi	
2011	Ekaant	Tina	Hindi	
2011	Force	Rachna	Hindi	
