= Shweta Mohan =

Indian singer (born 1985)

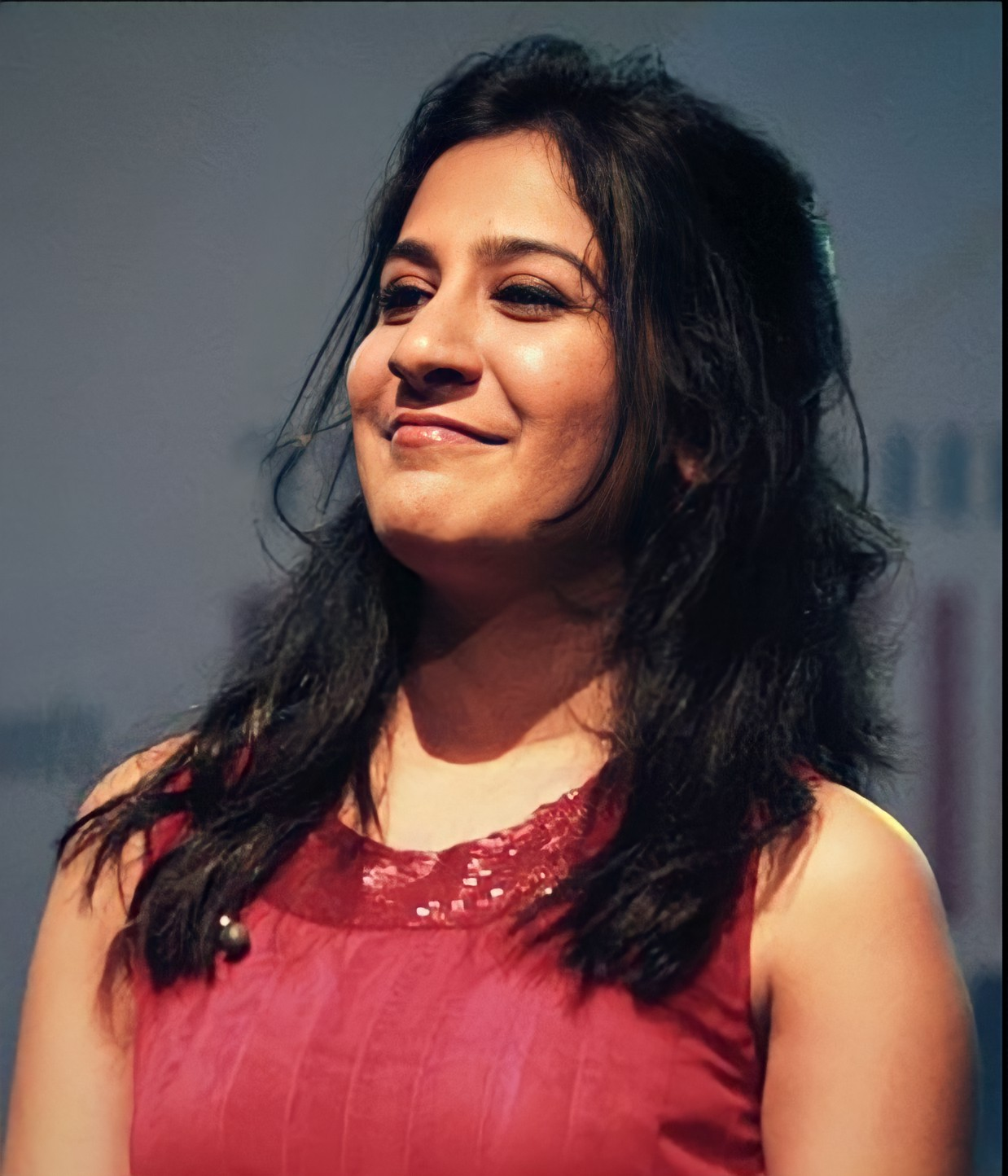
- Born: 19 November 1985 (age 40); Madras, Tamil Nadu, India
- Education: Stella Maris College, Chennai
- Occupations: Singer; music producer
- Years active: 2003–present
- Children: 1
- Mother: Sujatha Mohan
- Relatives: Paravoor T. K. Narayana Pillai (great-grandfather) G. Venugopal (uncle) Radhika Thilak (aunt)
- Musical career
- Genres: Filmi; Pop; Ghazal; Classical; Bhajan
- Instrument: Vocals
- Label: Independent artist
- Website: shwetamohan.com

Shweta Mohan (born 19 November 1985) is an Indian playback singer and music producer. She has recorded songs for films and albums in all the four south Indian cinema namely Tamil, Malayalam, Telugu and Kannada, besides few Hindi films and Bengali albums.

Born to playback singer Sujatha Mohan and Krishna Mohan, Shweta has received six Filmfare Awards South for Best Female Playback Singer, one Kerala State Film Award and one Tamil Nadu State Film Award. She was also honoured by the Government of Tamil Nadu with the Kalaimamani award, the highest civilian award from that state, in 2023.

Apart from playback singing, Shweta has appeared as a judge on several television reality shows and in music videos. She has collaborated with several artists and produced Indie singles.

== Early life ==
Shweta Mohan was born on 19 November 1985 to a Malayali family in Chennai, Tamil Nadu. Her father, V. Krishna Mohan is a pediatrician and also a musical enthusiast who has performed occasionally on musical stages, and her mother, Sujatha Mohan, is an accomplished playback singer. She completed her schooling at Good Shepherd Convent, Chennai and graduated from Stella Maris College, Chennai.

Though interested in music, Shweta expressed reluctance towards singing initially considering her voice was not good enough for playback singing. During her 10th grade, in a cultural competition, she sang "Bole Re Papihara" song from the film Guddi in the solo round which was judged by singer-composer, Bhavatharini. She won the first prize in the competition and Bhavatharini advised her to take up singing more seriously. This encouragement and recognition ignited her passion towards singing and made her to take up music as her career.

At the age of nine, Shweta began receiving formal training in classical music. Later, she started her lessons in Carnatic classical music and Hindustani classical music trained and groomed by vocalist, Binni Krishnakumar, and western vocals and piano under Augustine Paul. During one of her accompaniments with her mother for the song recordings with music director A. R. Rahman, she was asked to be part of the child chorus for his songs "Kuchi Kuchi Rakkamma" (Bombay, 1995) and "Accham Accham Illai" (Indira, 1995).

== Career ==
=== Playback singing ===
==== 2003–2010 : Debut, breakthrough and awards ====
While Shweta was in her eleventh grade in 2003, she happened to visit music director Ilaiyaraaja's house upon invitation by his daughter Bhavatharini during the Navarathri festival. There, she chanced upon Ilaiyaraaja's elder son and composer Karthik Raja, who upon learning that she is singer Sujatha's daughter, offered her to record her voice for two songs in the film Three Roses. Both the songs, "Meiyyanadha" and "Sevvai Desam" were duets with singer Karthik. Soon after this, she went back to her academics and finished her 12th grade and began her graduation. In 2005, composer Pravin Mani collaborated with the band S5 for his Malayalam soundtrack for the film, By the People. Shweta was called upon to collaborate with the band and sing all the songs for the film, thus marking her Malayalam debut. Soon later, she was called upon by Karthik Raja and Bhavatharini's younger brother, Yuvan Shankar Raja, to sing for his Telugu compositions for the films namely Raam (2006), Aadavari Matalaku Arthale Verule (2007) and Tamil compositions for the films, Pattiyal (2006) and Kannamoochi Yenada (2007). She recorded her first song with Ilaiyaraaja for the Malayalam film, Vinodayathra (2007) and with A. R. Rahman for the Kannada film, Sajini (2007).

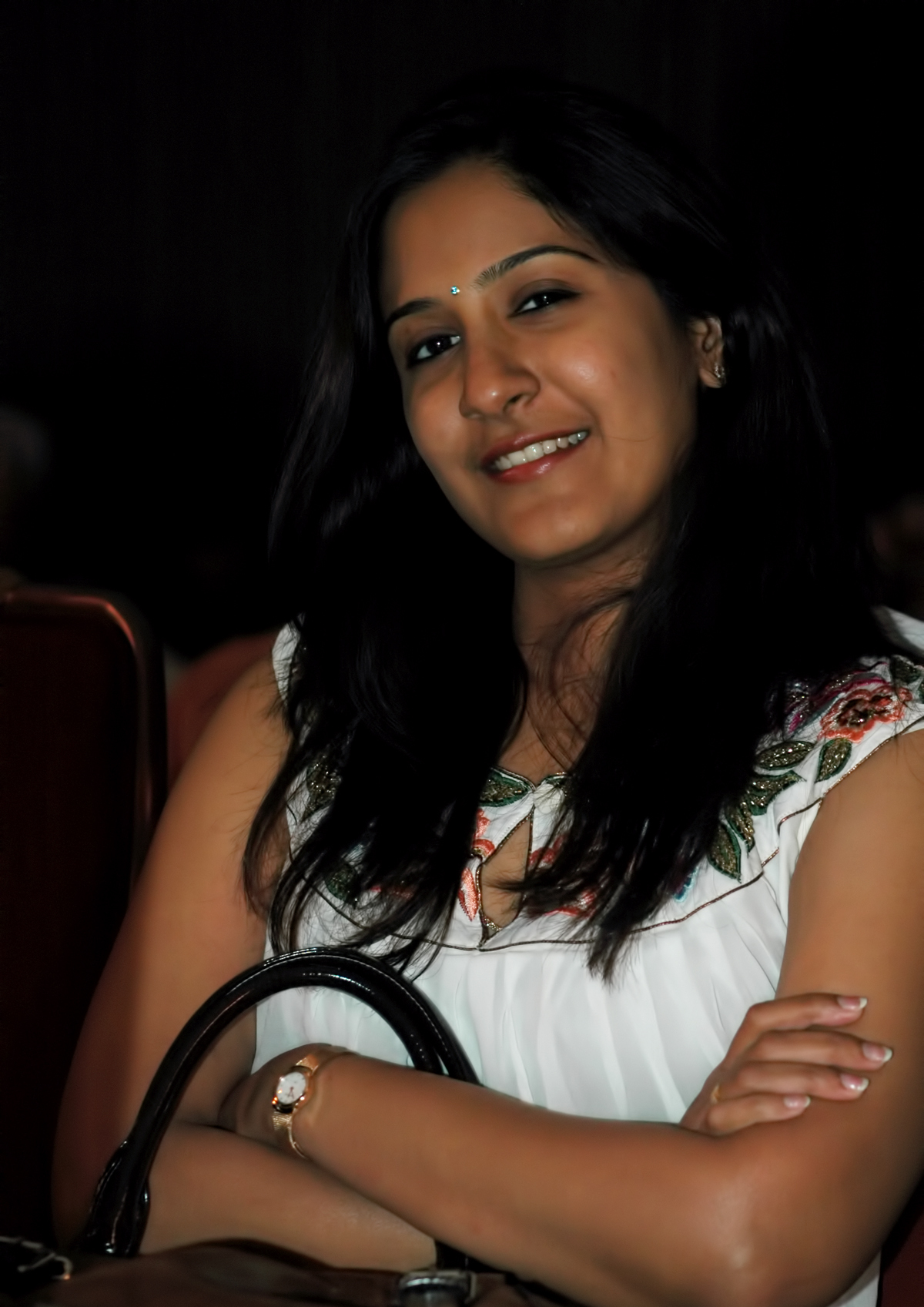
Shwetha at an event

Her biggest breakthrough came with the songs "Vizhiyil Un Vizhiyil", a duet with Sonu Nigam in the G. V. Prakash Kumar's musical Kireedam (2007) and Mani Sharma's composition "Nee Muttham Ondru" for the film Pokkiri. The year 2007 also marked her association with composer M. Jayachandran who offered her three songs in the film Nivedyam. The song "Kolakkuzhal Vili Ketto" fetched her Kerala State Film Award for Best Singer for the year 2007. Their next collaboration for the film Novel (2008) fetched her Asianet Film award for Best Playback Singer for the song "Kuyile". This was followed by her first win at the Filmfare Awards South for the song "Yamuna Veruthe" composed by Ouseppachan from the film Ore Kadal in 2008. Her association with composer Vidyasagar began with the hit song "Enthaaninnennodonnum" from the film, Goal (2007) and she earned a Filmfare award nomination for the song "Kandaen Kandaen" for the film Pirivom Sandhipom (2008). Music director Gurukiran gave her a break in Kannada cinema through the hit song "Pathra Bareyala" from the film, Aramane (2008). She continued to sing for big production movies such as Siva Manasula Sakthi, Ananda Thandavam and Guru En Aalu in Tamil, Robinhood, Daddy Cool and Bhagyadevatha in Malayalam, Rechipo and Saarai Veerraju in Telugu cinema.

In 2010, she collaborated with A. R. Rahman in S. Shankar's highly anticipated sci-fi film, Enthiran. The song "Boom Boom Robot Da" featured her vocals predominantly along with her co-singers Yogi B, Keerthi Sagathia and Tanvi Shah. The soundtrack has received generally positive reviews and on the second day of release, the album was on top of the US iTunes Top 10 World Albums chart, making it the first Indian album to reach the spot. Besides the original Tamil song, she gave vocals to the Telugu dubbed version as well. Her next popular song was "Oh Maha Zeeya", a duet with Hariharan, from the film Tamizh Padam which had music composed by Kannan. The song consisted several Gibberish words which were derived from some of the earlier popular Tamil songs. The Malayalam song "Maavin Chottile", composed by M. G. Sreekumar for the film Oru Naal Varum brought her many laurels and awards including Asiavision award and JaiHind TV film award. Her songs in Malayalam films such as Aagathan, Four Friends, Kadha Thudarunnu, Sakudumbam Shyamala and Elsamma Enna Aankutty brought her more popularity and positioned her space in Malayalam cinema. The Telugu song "Amma Thalle", composed by A. R. Rahman for the film Puli (2010), was recorded using a technique to make lyrics run in fast pace. She won the Best Female Playback Singer award at the Mirchi Music Awards South for the year 2011. The Kannada songs "Hejjegondu Hejje" from Prithvi (2010) and "Dil Kush" from Eno Onthara (2010) topped the charts and had repeated broadcast across media.

==== 2011–2020: Successful collaborations and further recognition ====
The year 2011 marked the beginning of Shweta's association with composer Sharreth through the Tamil – Telugu bilingual film 180. The soundtrack met with positive response from critics and audience, particularly her duet song with Karthik, "Nee Korinaal", receiving nomination as the best female playback singer at the 59th Filmfare Awards South. The song won the Listener's choice award at the Mirchi Music Awards South. Her collaboration with composer Harris Jayaraj began with the film Ko and 7 Aum Arivu. She had multiple hit songs in Tamil in the year 2011 and was awarded the Tamil Nadu State Film Award for Best Female Playback Singer for multiple films including Kaavalan, Vettai, Thambikottai, Veppam and Vithagan. In Malayalam, she collaborated first time with the acclaimed singer K. J. Yesudas with the duet "Aaro Nee Aaro" for the film Urumi composed by Deepak Dev. Other popular Malayalam songs of the year 2011 came through the films Christian Brothers, Three Kings, Bangkok Summer and Snehaveedu. The epic devotional Telugu film Sri Rama Rajyam had music composed by Ilaiyaraaja and had multiple songs recorded by Shweta both in original and dubbed versions. The Telugu film 100% Love featured two hit songs in her voice.

The year 2012 marked the beginning of Shweta's association with the "new-gen" music composer Anirudh Ravichander through the Tamil film 3. The romantic duet "Nee Paartha Vizhigal" along with Vijay Yesudas topped the charts upon its release. The Malayalam song "Shyama Hare" from Arike composed by Ouseppachan was widely appreciated for her singing and brought her the second Filmfare Award for best singer. Both "Nee Partha" and "Shyama Hare" earned her the first nominations at the 2nd SIIMA Awards for her playback. In 2013, her collaboration with music directors expanded with Devi Sri Prasad, Ghibran, James Vasanthan, S. A. Rajkumar, Shahabaz Aman, Alex Paul, Prashant Pillai and Ramana Gogula offering her songs in their compositions. The Bharat Bala directed survival drama film Maryan further boosted her singing career with the song "Innum Konjam Neram" which was composed by A. R. Rahman and co-sung by Vijay Prakash. The song attained the peak position on the Radio Mirchi South Top 20 charts at No. 18 even after a month of its release. She was nominated at several award ceremonies including 8th Vijay Awards and 3rd SIIMA Awards under Best female playback singer category. She made her Bollywood debut with the song "Yun Hi Re" in the Anirudh Ravichander musical film David. In 2014, her biggest hits include "Yaarumilla" from A. R. Rahman musical Kaaviya Thalaivan which received wide acclaim from critics and audience and "Onnanam Kombathe" from the film Ottamandaram. Both these songs brought her several nominations and awards at various award ceremonies.

The 2015 released film Thanga Magan proved yet another significant milestone in Shweta's playback career with her solo song "Enna Solla", composed by Anirudh Ravichander, fetching her the third Filmfare Award for best female playback singer, and her first SIIMA Award. She got the opportunity to sing the songs in the Malayalam dubbed version of Baahubali: The Beginning. Her other Malayalam hits of the year were from Bhaskar The Rascal and Anarkali. The Kannada song "Kanasali Nadesu", written by Jayanth Kaikini and composed by V. Harikrishna for the film Kendasampige was widely acclaimed upon release. The year 2016 began with her first collaboration with Santhosh Narayanan with the films Kabali and Kodi. The former was a Rajinikanth starrer and the song "Maya Nadhi" brought her the fourth Filmfare award for best singer. The year saw Shweta being associated in biggest Telugu blockbuster films such as Nenu Sailaja, Janatha Garage and Malayalam films such as White, Thoppil Joppan and Action Hero Biju. The song "Oru Puzhayarikil" from the Malayalam film Munthirivallikal Thalirkkumbol (2017), composed by Bijibal, brought many laurels and awards to her kitty. The song "Macho Ennacho" from Mersal (2017), composed by A. R. Rahman, gave her first duet with singer Sid Sriram and also earned her a Filmfare award nomination. Santhosh Narayanan roped her to sing the Telugu and Hindi dubbed version songs of the Tamil film Kaala (2018). In 2019, she collaborated with Bollywood composers Shankar-Ehsaan-Loy for the Telugu film Saaho. Her songs "Etho Mazhayil" from the Malayalam film Vijay Superum Pournamiyum and "Jhumma Jhumma" from the Kannada film Kurukshetra topped the charts in the same year. She continued to sing popular songs in 2020 for Malayalam and Tamil films, namely, Al Mallu, Varane Avashyamund, Kappela and Naadodigal 2.

==== 2021–present: Multi-lingual songs and career expansions ====
In 2021, Shweta recorded songs in two multi-lingual films: Marakkar - Arabikadalinte Simham and 99 Songs. The former song was composed by Ronnie Rapheal and featured her voice in Malayalam, Tamil, Telugu, Kannada and Hindi languages. The latter, produced and composed by A. R. Rahman were recorded in Hindi, Tamil, Telugu and Malayalam languages. This was followed by yet another Rahman composition for the film, Malayankunju in 2022. The song "Mannum Niranje" was recorded in various other languages in the voice of Shweta.

In 2023, Shweta teamed up again with Dhanush and G. V. Prakash Kumar for their Tamil-Telugu bilingual film Vaathi (Sir in Telugu). The song "Vaa Vaathi" ("Mastaaru Mastaaru" in Telugu) won Shweta several awards including Ananda Vikatan Cinema Awards and Filmfare Award South. She was nominated at the IIFA Utsavam and the SIIMA awards (for both Tamil and Telugu songs). She continued to record various songs in pan-Indian films such as Ponniyin Selvan: II, Adipurush, Lucky Baskhar, Shaakuntalam and Valatty.

The songs "Water Packet" from Raayan (composed by A. R. Rahman) and "Hey Minnale" from Amaran (composed by G. V. Prakash Kumar) topped the music charts in 2024. Her association with G. V. Prakash Kumar further produced hit songs such as "Kalloorum" (Veera Dheera Sooran: Part 2) and "Enna Sugam" (Idli Kadai) in 2025. She collaborated with composer Hesham Abdul Wahab for the Tamil version of his own Malayalam song, "Pottu Thotta Pournami", in the film Maaman.

=== Indie singles and stage performances ===
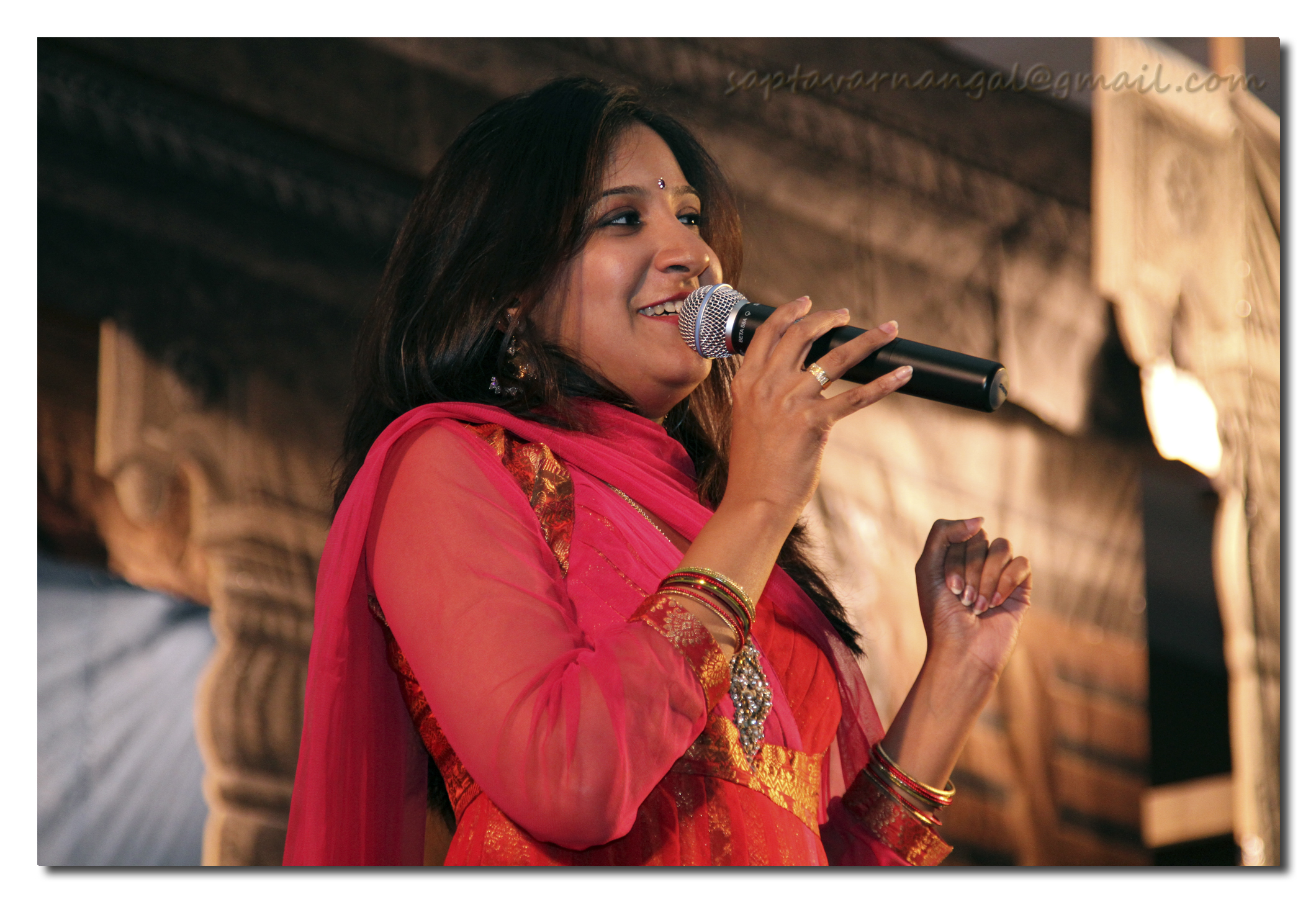
Shwetha performing during a concert

Apart from film playback singing, Shweta has been actively performing and producing Indie pop singles. Her first single was a Tamil-Hindi bilingual "Yaavum Enadhe"/"Sab Mera Hai" released in 2018 and composed by guitarist Bennet Roland, with whom she had long association and jammed multiple times before. Her next single, "Amma" was released as a dedication to her mother Sujatha who had been conferred with lifetime achievement award in 2023. In 2025, she collaborated with composer Vidyasagar to compose her next single "Maathey" featuring Sujatha Mohan. Later, in the same year, she composed and sang her next Tamil-Hindi bilingual single named "I Love You Sollada" (Tamil) /"I Love You Love You Re" (Hindi).

Shweta has been performing extensively in live concerts, particularly touring the world with composers A. R. Rahman, Ilaiyaraaja and Vidyasagar. She has described live performances as a "heartbeat" of her artistic expression, emphasizing the energy and connection with the audience, though she has also expressed nervousness about performing certain songs live versus in a studio.

== Personal life ==
Shweta married her long-time friend and software engineer-businessman, Ashwin Sashi on 16 January 2011. The couple have a daughter.

== Television ==
List of television credits
Year	Title	Role	Channel	Notes
2011–2014	Bade Achche Lagte Hain	Singer	Sony Television	sang title track in Tamil
2015	Music India	Judge	Asianet	Appear at the semi-final and final in the show with Gopi Sunder, Deepak Dev.
2015	Bol Baby Bol	Judge	Surya TV	Along with Gopi Sunder
2018	Super Singer 6	Judge	Vijay TV	One of the judge with P. Unnikrishnan, Anuradha Sriram & Benny Dayal
2019	Super Singer 7	Judge	Vijay TV	One of the judge with P. Unnikrishnan, Anuradha Sriram & Benny Dayal
2020	Super Singer Champion of Champions	Judge	Vijay TV	
2021	Super Singer 8	Judge	Vijay TV	One of the judge with P. Unnikrishnan, Anuradha Sriram & Benny Dayal
2022–2023	Super Singer 9	Judge	Vijay TV	One of the judges with P. Unnikrishnan, Anuradha Sriram & Benny Dayal
2023	Super Singer 3 (Telugu)	Judge	Star Maa	One of the judges with Rahul Sipligunj, Anantha Sriram & Mangli
2024	Super Singer 10	Guest	Star Vijay	To celebrate her mother, Sujatha Mohan's birthday.
2024	Sa Re Ga Ma Pa Seniors 4	Guest Judge	Zee Tamil	Guest judge with K. S. Ravikumar for mega auditions
2024	Sa Re Ga Ma Pa Li'l Champs 4	Judge	Zee Tamil	One of the judges with Srinivas, S. P. Charan & Saindhavi
2025	Sa Re Ga Ma Pa Seniors 5	Judge	Zee Tamil	One of the judges with Srinivas, Vijay Prakash, Karthik, Saindhavi & S. P. Charan
2025	Sa Re Ga Ma Pa Keralam Season 3	Guest	Zee Keralam	
2025	Sa Re Ga Ma Pa Li'l Champs 5	Judge	Zee Tamil	One of the judges with Srinivas, S. P. Charan & Saindhavi

== Awards and nominations ==
1.Filmfare Award for Best Female Playback Singer – Tamil 2018, 2017, 2016 & 2025

2.Filmfare Award for Best Female Playback Singer – Malayalam 2018, 2017, 2016.

3.Vijay Award for Best Female Playback Singer 2014, 2012, 2009.

4.IIFA Utsavam Award for Best Playback Singer Female Kannada 2016.

5.Kalaimamani Award (2023) from Government of Tamil Nadu
