= Out of Syllabus =

2006 Malayalam film directed by Viswanathan

- Directed by: Viswanathan
- Written by: Viswanathan
- Produced by: Thekkumuri Haridas; Devadas Mackenchery
- Starring: Arjun Sasi; Niranjana; Parvathy Thiruvothu
- Music by: Bennet Veetraag
- Release date: 17 February 2006
- Running time: 114 minutes
- Country: India
- Language: Malayalam

Out of Syllabus is a 2006 Indian Malayalam-language film written and directed by Viswanathan. The film stars Arjun Sasi, Niranjana and Parvathy Thiruvothu (in her film debut). It was released on 17 February 2006. The film was a box office success.

== Story ==
The film tells the story of Gopikrishnan, a village lad who goes to a city college, and becomes the butt of all jokes on the campus. Through constant effort and more than a little help from Namitha, he becomes the College Union Chairman. While at college he bumps into Gayathri, an old school mate of his. Their closeness drives a wedge between Gopi and Namitha, but they come back closer.

== Cast ==
- Arjun Sasi as Gopikrishnan
- Niranjana as Namitha
- Parvathy Thiruvothu as Gayathri
  - Shaalin Zoya as Jr. Gayathri
- M. R. Gopakumar
- Jayakrishnan Kichu as Manu
- Venu Nagavalli as Namitha's Uncle
- A. K. Lohithadas (Cameo Appearance)
- Tom George Kolath (Cameo Appearance)
- Harish
- Meghanathan
- Senthil
- Ottapalam Pappan
- Prabhu Mens Sana

== Production ==
Arjun Sasi, who is a DJ with SS Music, plays the lead role. Praseetha who is a model turned actress, adopts the screen name of Niranjana and does her debut role as Namitha, the leading lady of the film. Parvathy Thiruvothu made her debut in Malayalam 2006 in this movie.

== Soundtrack ==
The film's soundtrack contains 7 songs, all composed by Bennet Veetraag and lyrics by Rafeeq Ahamed.

#	Title	Singer(s)
1	"Ee Jeevitham"	Balu
2	"Ee Kalppadavil"	G. Venugopal
3	"Ee Kalppadavil [F]"	Asha Ajay
4	"Poovinithal"	Vidhu Prathap, Gayatri Asokan
5	"Maayaajaalakathin"	Vineeth Sreenivasan
6	"Poyvaruvaan [F]"	Manjari
7	"Poyvaruvaan [M]"	Veetraag
