= August Club =

- Promotional poster
- Directed by: K. B. Venu
- Written by: Anantha Padmanabhan
- Based on: Venalinte Kalaneekkangal by Anantha Padmanabhan
- Produced by: V. S. Adheesh
- Starring: Rima Kallingal; Murali Gopy; Thilakan; Monisha Sagar; Praveen Anidil
- Cinematography: Pratap P Nair
- Edited by: Manoj Kannoth
- Music by: Bennet Veetraag
- Production company: Darshini Concepts
- Release date: 26 April 2013
- Running time: 120 minutes
- Country: India
- Language: Malayalam

August Club, also called August Club Since 1969, is a 2013 Malayalam romantic drama film directed by K. B. Venu. It tells the story about the nuances in marital life. The screenplay is written by Anantha Padmanabhan, based on his novelette titled Venalinte Kalaneekkangal. August Club marked the debut of both K. B. Venu and Anantha Padmanabhan. The film was produced by V. S. Atheesh.

== Plot ==
August Club is a woman-centric film told from the point of view of Savithri, a young upper middle class housewife. She is the unrivalled chess champion of a nearby local club. She shares a loving and sensual relationship with her husband Nandan, who is a busy business executive. A new member Shishir joins the club and defeats Savithri in the game of chess. Shishir, also a lover of music and poetry like Savitri, is drawn to her.

== Cast ==
- Rima Kallingal as Savithri
- Murali Gopy as Nandagopan
- Thilakan as KPT Menon
- Praveen Anidil as Shishir
- Sukumari as Bhagavati Amma
- Mala Aravindan as Lazar
- K. P. A. C. Lalitha as Nandan's Amma
- Rakendu
- Sunil Sukhada as Lona
- Monisha Sagar as Leena Zacharias
- Sasi Kalinga as Cheru
- Unni Thrippunithura as Appan
- Arun as Kishore
- Ganapathi S Poduval as Benny
- Esther Anil
- Krishna
- Cherthala Lalitha as Reetha
- Tovino Thomas as Mahesh

== Production ==
The film is journalist-turned television personality K. B. Venu's directorial debut. It is also the debut attempt at screen-writing for Anantha Padmanabhan, son of writer and filmmaker Padmarajan.

The film is based on the novelette Venalinte Kalaneekkangal which was published in the Malayala Manorama Vishuppathippu. "When I wrote Venalinte Kalaneekkangal, I never thought of converting it into a movie. It was Lal Jose, my friend, who discovered an inherent cinematic probability," says Ananda Padmanabhan. Though the film is true to the original story, minor modifications have been introduced to broaden its cinematic scope. While the story begins in an urban setting, the narrative meanders to a village of chess players. The inspiration is from Marottichal, a village in Thrissur, which is famous for its chess-playing population. The scenarist says, "Though the subtleties of chess were not fully utilised in my novel in order to make it simple for the readers to comprehend, some shrewd complexities have been introduced to the script."

The film was initially titled Venalinte Kalaneekkangal itself but was later renamed as August Club which in the movie is a club where the main protagonists meet. K. B. Venu says, "We felt it created bit of a confusion. When the title was written in English, the meaning was altered. Though the name is poetic, we felt it didn't communicate well to the public. So, we decided to change. August Club is a club in the movie where the main protagonists meet. We felt it's catchy and does connect to the movie."

The film was launched on 21 May 2012 with a pooja ceremony which was attended by the crew members along with other actors and major filmmakers including K G George, Mohan, Lal Jose, Murali Gopi, Priyanandan, K. P. A. C. Lalitha and B. Unnikrishnan. Principal photography for the film started in June 2012 and took place entirely at Alappuzha in Kerala.

== Music ==
The film's music was composed by the music director duo Bennet Veetraag with lyrics penned by Rafeeq Ahmed. "It's gonna be a different feel altogether in this movie," said Veetraag of the duo. There were three songs and Bennet sang two songs. The other singers include Shreya Ghoshal, Srinivas, Vijay Prakash, and Veetraag. Thilakan's son Shobi Thilakan has sung a few lines for Thilakan. Jaya Kerr, who just won the worldwide singing competition, sang in this movie for song of "Vaathil Charumo" along with Srinivas .

Song	Length	Singer(s)	Picturization
"Vaathil Charumo"		Shreya Ghoshal & Srinivas	
"Kaattu Theno"		Vijay Prakash & Shobi Thilakan	
"Kathorthuvo"		Sujatha & Veetraag	

== Critical reception ==
K. Padmakumar of Malayala Manorama gave the film a 2/5 rating, and said, "The limitations of stretching a small story into a full-length movie is always visible" and that "No curiosity is generated till late after half time". Paresh C Palicha writing for Rediff.com said that the film is "rich in subtext and distinctive characters, [which] makes for an interesting watch", but was disappointed with a predictable climax. Unni R. Nair of Kerala9.com stated that "August Club stands out as a well-made and well scripted film, with neat, excellent performances by the key players." He labelled the film's screenplay as a "striking" one, background score as "one of the highlights of the film" and the songs as "too good", rating the film 3 of 5.
