= Isai (album) =

2005 studio album by Indian band S5

Studio album by S5
- Released: 2005 (India)
- Genre: Indian pop
- Producer: Sony BMG

Isai (transl. Music) is the debut studio album of the Indian band S5 that was released in March 2005. The music for the album was composed by Pravin Mani.

== Production ==
The album comprises eight songs (six original tracks and two bonus tracks) composed by Pravin Mani at the Rajiv Menon Studios in Chennai. Although none of the band members are Tamilians, (Note: Although Bhargavi Pillai is Tamil, she is not fluent in Tamil since she lived in Hyderabad.) the band felt that "Tamil songs would have widest appeal". The first single from the album, "Malarey", was shot in Kodaikanal. The song was released by the SS Music channel on 19 March 2005 at an event in Chennai.

== Track listing ==
All of the songs were composed by Pravin Mani and performed by S5.

Track listing
No.	Title	Singer(s)	Length
1.	"Iravum Pagalum"	S5	—
2.	"Malarey"	S5	3:45
3.	"Rock Me"	S5	3:26
4.	"If u want it"	S5	—
5.	"Isai yudaney"	S5	—
6.	"Ninaithal"	S5	4:37
Total length:			—

=== Bonus Tracks ===
Track listing
No.	Title	Singer(s)	Length
1.	"Iravum Pagalum (remix)"	S5	—
2.	"Malarey (unplugged)"	S5	—

== Reception and impact ==
Upon release, the album was at the "top of the charts in Tamil Nadu and even in Kerala". Two songs – "Malarey" and "Rock Me" – went on to be reused in the film By The People (2005) as Malayalam songs after Pravin Mani recommended the band to the film's director Jayaraj.

== Credits and personnel ==
As per the official album credits:

- Pravin Mani – composer
- M. Venkatakrishnan – sound engineer
- Biju, Sanjay – additional programming
- Kavivarman – lyricist (Note: Indiantelevision.com credits the lyrics to Venkatesh.)
- Vijai – guitar
- Naveen – flute
- Prasad – tabla
- Mohan, Unni – studio assistants
