= Padmakumar =

Padmakumar is a surname. Notable people with the surname include:

- M. Padmakumar, Indian film director
- M. B. Padmakumar, Indian actor, television personality, and filmmaker
