= SS Music =

Southern Spice Music
- Headquarters: Chennai, Tamil Nadu, India

Ownership
- Key people: Mr. Jose Charles Martin

History
- Launched: 14 April 2001
- Founder: Mr. Santiago Martin

Links
- Website: https://ssmusicdigital.com

SS Music, or Southern Spice Music, was a satellite television channel based in Chennai, India. The multilingual music channel broadcast film songs from Tamil, Telugu, Malayalam and Kannada film industry. The music channel also aired mainstream international music from US, UK, Europe regions. The company was started by Fortune Media PVT LTD as a channel to announce lottery results. In 2004 the company was approached by MTV India for a takeover, to be branded as MTV South, but the deal fell through.

== Channel content and hosts ==
Southern Spice Music was started in 2001 as a purely music entertainment channel, with English as their language of communication and the content in the multilingual format, mainly Tamil, Telugu, Malayalam and Kannada, catering to South Indian listeners. It has since been relaunched as an entertainment channel on digital platforms.

The reality shows like Voice hunt, VJ Factor, Launchpad, Dance with me, Challenge made the music channel famous in South India.

The daily shows like Reach out, Virtual request, Connect, FIR, Hi5, Room with a view, Career show, Game station were hosted by VJ Craig, VJ Sriya Reddy VJ Carry, VJ Paloma, VJ Pooja, VJ Rajiv, VJ Shyam, and Vj Shaunak among others.
