= Dr. Patient =

- Directed by: Viswanathan
- Written by: Viswanathan
- Produced by: Ramprasad
- Starring: Jayasurya; Mukesh; Radha Varma
- Cinematography: M. J. Radhakrishnan
- Edited by: Mahesh Narayanan
- Music by: Bennet Veetraag
- Release date: 20 June 2009
- Country: India
- Language: Malayalam

Dr. Patient is a 2009 Indian Malayalam-language film written and directed by Viswananathan, starring Jayasurya, Mukesh and Radha Varma.

== Plot ==
The movie is set in a mental hospital where Dr. Ruben Isaac comes to work as a doctor. He uses humanitarian principles to treat his patients, whom he calls his "clients".

Rakhi Devadas with a hospital management degree from U.S. is the managing director of this hospital. Her strict ways in dealing with patients often creates clashes with the new doctor. Dr. Isaac, meanwhile shows love and care and offers more freedom to the inmates which the M.D. does not like. The movie takes a turn with the arrival of another person, who claims to be the original doctor posted to the hospital.

== Cast ==
- Jayasurya as Dr. Ruben Isaac (Fake) / Bobby
- Mukesh as Dr. Ruben Isaac
- Radha Varma as Rakhi Devadas, MD of the hospital
- Manikuttan as Rafeeque
- Kulappulli Leela as Kathrina
- Mala Aravindan as Thankachan
- Jagathy Sreekumar as Poduval
- Bijukuttan as Sajan
- Anoop Chandran as Kunjoonju
- Maniyanpilla Raju as Shankaran
- Suraj Venjaramoodu as Eenashoo
- Manikandan Pattambi
- Indulekha
- Bose Venkat

== Soundtrack ==
- Mazha Njanarinjirunnilla - Hariharan

== Reception ==
Sify.com wrote "Even when the end titles roll, you may still have no idea about what the director was trying to say, in Dr.Patient? Just don't bother, it's a farcical exercise, as you will soon realize. Better, go for a walk and forget this horrible experience as a bad dream!" Paresh C Palicha from Rediff.com wrote "Jayasurya after doing a couple of intense roles in the past few months returns to doing senseless comedy. Radha Varma has nothing special to offer and is mediocre to say the least. That leaves the comedians led by Jagathy Sreekumar, Suraj Venjaramoodu, Anoop Chandran, Bijukuttan and others to entertain us, which they fail to do due to lack of cohesiveness and purpose. In final analysis, Doctor Patient drives viewers crazy"
