= Pravin Mani =

Indian musician

- Also known as: Praveen Mani
- Born: Pravin Mani; Chennai, Tamil Nadu, India
- Genre: Film score
- Occupations: Composer, record producer, music director, singer
- Years active: 2001–present

Pravin Mani is an Indian musician who has been credited as a singer and as a composer in Tamil, Malayalam, Telugu films in India. He has been a long term associate with noted music director, A. R. Rahman, with recent collaborations in Enthiran. He has also played a key role in the background scores for several Rahman films including Mudhalvan and Alai Payuthey. He resides in Toronto, Canada.

== Discography ==
=== Film/album score and soundtracks ===
Year	Title	Language	Score	Songs	Notes
2001	Little John	Tamil; Hindi	Yes	Yes	Dubbed in Telugu as Little John
2002	Alibaba	English	Yes	Yes	
2003	Parasuram	Tamil	Yes	No	
2003	Ottran	Tamil	Yes	Yes	
2003	Son of Aladdin	English	Yes	Yes	Dubbed in Hindi as Son of Aladdin
2004	Udhaya	Tamil	Yes	No	
2004	Rain Rain Come Again	Malayalam	Yes	No	
2005	Dancer	Tamil	Yes	Yes	
2005	Private Moments	English	Yes	Yes	
2005	Finger Print	Malayalam	Yes	Yes	
2005	Sukran	Tamil	Yes	Yes	
2005	Isai	Tamil	Yes	Yes	Album
2005	By the People	Malayalam	Yes	Yes	Reused 2 songs from Isai
2005	Daivanamathil	Malayalam	Yes	Yes	
2005	Ramji Londonwaley	Hindi	Yes	No	
2006	Thoothukudi	Tamil	Yes	Yes	
2006	Aadu Puli Attam	Tamil	Yes	Yes	
2006	Balram vs. Tharadas	Malayalam	Yes	No	
2006	Perarasu	Tamil	Yes	Yes	
2006	Backwaters	English	Yes	Yes	
2007	Thirutham	Tamil	Yes	Yes	
2007	Manhattan Biriyani	English	Yes	Yes	
2008	Iyakkam	Tamil	Yes	Yes	
2008	Ghatothkach	Hindi	Yes	No	Dubbed in 6 languages
2010	Chikku Bukku	Tamil	Yes	Yes	
2011	Payanam; Gaganam	Tamil; Telugu	Yes	Yes	
2012	Mirattal	Tamil	Yes	Yes	
2013	A Gun & a Ring	Tamil	Yes	Yes	
2023	Rajugari Kodipulao	Telugu	Yes	Yes	

=== Singles ===
Year	Song	Language	Notes
2023	"Ammadi"	Tamil	
2024	"Aao Killele"	Tamil	
