= Irupathiyonnaam Noottaandu =

Indian Malayalam-language action adventure romance film

- Theatrical release poster
- Directed by: Arun Gopy
- Written by: Arun Gopy
- Produced by: Tomichan Mulakuppadam
- Starring: Pranav Mohanlal; Rachel David
- Cinematography: Abinandhan Ramanujam
- Edited by: Vivek Harshan
- Music by: Gopi Sundar
- Production company: Mulakuppadam Films
- Distributed by: Mulakuppadam Release
- Release dates: 25 January 2019 (India, GCC)
- Running time: 163 minutes
- Country: India
- Language: Malayalam

Irupathiyonnaam Noottaandu (transl. Twenty-first century) is a 2019 Indian Malayalam-language action romance film written and directed by Arun Gopy and produced by Tomichan Mulakuppadam through the company Mulakuppadam Films. The film stars Pranav Mohanlal and Rachel David. Gokul Suresh appears in a cameo role. Gopi Sundar composed the music and Abinandhan Ramanujam was the cinematographer. Peter Hein choreographed the action for the film and Vivek Harshan was the film editor.

The film's principal photography took place between July and December 2018 in Goa, Bali, Kerala, and Hyderabad. Irupathiyonnaam Noottaandu was released in India and Gulf Cooperation Council territories on 25 January 2019 by Mulakuppadam Release.

== Plot ==
The story revolves around the life of Appu, a boy born and brought up in Goa. The movie starts with New Year's Eve, wherein Macaroni and his girlfriend are celebrating. Much to his annoyance, Abusi and his henchmen enter and demand the money borrowed by Baba as he was the one who guaranteed payment. Macaroni flees and is eventually caught by Abusi's men, who takes him to their place. After some time, Baba appears at their house, and he is also caught by them. This leads to the entry of Appu, Baba's only son, who is an expert surfer and jet ski rider. Appu assures them payment and settles a small amount of money, and bails out Macaroni and Baba. On the eve of the Russian new year, Appu is confronted by a woman named Zaya, who was creating a scene there as she lost her phone. Appu agrees to drop her to her homestay but is eventually forced to take her to his homestay as she was drunk and couldn't remember the location of her homestay.

Eventually, Appu and Zaya become good friends, and they do a variety of activities in Goa, such as visiting tourist places, jet skiing, and going to casinos. Slowly Appu starts developing feelings for Zaya. He then decides to convey his feelings to her, but when he does so, she freaks out and runs away. When he goes to her the next day, he finds out that she has gone to her hometown in Kerala. After a few days, Baba approaches him and suggests that he go to Kerala to know whether she has feelings for him. He then reaches Kerala with Macroni. When he goes to her palatial house's entrance, he finds it locked and finds out that all of them have gone for an engagement ceremony. Thinking it is Zaya's engagement, an upset Appu decides to go to the church and eventually finds out that it was Zaya's sister's engagement. He, however, is shocked to know that Zaya is a nun. This leads to the formation of various mysteries in his mind (due to her carefree nature back in Goa) and he confronts Zaya at her convent. Zaya reveals that she became a nun because on a Christmas Eve when she was young, she was sexually exploited by her uncle who worked for the police. This was not known to any of her family members as she was hesitant to tell them fearing more harm from her uncle. She became a nun when she found out that her uncle didn't show any respect towards women other than nuns. Appu understands Zaya's plight and assures her that he will always be there for her. He learns that Zaya loves him and she aspires to become a free-spirited young girl.

On the eve of Zaya's sister's pre-wedding function, Appu is employed as a waiter there since the owner of the lodge in which he was staying was organizing the wedding. Since he has not paid the rent of the lodge, he decides to take up work as a waiter to clear his dues, and so that he can meet and talk to Zaya. But as he converses with Zaya, he is confronted by her uncle, who beats him up. Appu is thrown out of the function along with the other workers, and he is caught by police due to initiation by Zaya's uncle; he is freed the next day as the lodge owner bails him out. Appu then rushes to the wedding, beats up Zaya's uncle and his men and walks out holding Zaya's hand. They are chased by police, and they resort to taking up shelter for a day in a priest's convent lodging. Over there, Appu and Zaya receive the help of Francis, who assures them to take them to the railway station without being noticed by the police. They reach the station and board the train; however, they are shocked to find Zaya's uncle and his men in the train searching for them. As Appu and Zaya run away from them to a different compartment, they are surprised to find Baba, who tells Appu that if he wants to live with her, he must stop running away and face them with courage. Taking account of Baba's words, Appu fights Zaya's uncle and his men. He overpowers them but is unfortunately caught by the police from the next station and is taken for questioning, where they come to know that Zaya running away with Appu has resulted in huge media attention as it was framed as a subject of communalism in the media's language.

After the intervention of a bishop, they decide that Appu should go alone without Zaya. When Appu asks whether she has any last words for him, she hugs him tightly. She is then interrupted by her father, and Zaya musters up the courage to reveal what she was subjected to as a young girl and how she had to live with it. This leads to the sudden understanding of her parents. Her uncle, wanting to defend himself, walks up to Zaya to slap her, but he is stopped by her mother who slaps him. Eventually, Zaya's uncle is given a legal punishment, and Appu happily moves to Goa with Zaya. Appu clears away the dues he had with Abusi by selling Macaroni's land in Kerala. The film ends on a happy note, saying that we must ensure healthy family relationships and must also be warned that women and young girls are subjected to rape within their very own household.

== Cast ==
- Pranav Mohanlal as Appu
- Rachel David as Zaya
  - Advika as Young Zaya
- Gokul Suresh as Francis (cameo appearance)
- Manoj K. Jayan as Baba
- Abhishek Raveendran as Michael Rony / Macaroni
- Shaju K. S. as Cherappayi
- Dharmajan Bolgatty as Godwin
- Bijukuttan as Charlie, Godwin's friend
- Kalabhavan Shajohn as Abusi
- Innocent as Bishop (Cameo Appearance)
- Harish Raj as DYSP Xavier, Zaya's uncle, the main antagonist
- Siddique as Father
- Austin as Stephen
- Amala Alphonsa as Ammu, Appu's sister
- Nelson Sooranad as Home-stay Cook
- Shaju K. S. as Cherappayi
- G. Suresh Kumar as Zaya's father
- Tini Tom as ACP Majeed Ali IPS
- Sreedhanya as Prabha
- Parvathi T. as Mother Superior
- Antony Perumbavoor as Antony Bavoor (Cameo Appearance)
- Jayakrishnan as Sebastian Paul
- Vinod Kedamangalam as Munnar Constable
- Bindu Sajeev as Maria Koshy
- Megha Thomas as Elizabeth
- Nimisha Anna Thomas as Sarah Koshy
- Dini Daniel as Alice, Xavier's wife
- Binu Manamboor as Vattavila
- Rosina Shoji as Elsa Jacob
- Aaron Mathew as Kevin
- Parvathy Arun as Merin

== Production ==
=== Development ===
The film was announced by Arun Gopy on 3 March 2018 via social media. Announcing the film, Arun wrote the untitled film would be written and directed by himself and would be produced by Mulakuppadam Films with Pranav Mohanlal in the lead role. It is his second directorial and consecutive collaboration with producer Tomichan Mulakuppadam after Ramaleela (2017), and his debut writing task. The title of the film was revealed through a poster released on 9 July 2018 and a puja ceremony for the film was held on the same day at Anchumana Devi Temple in Edappally. The film carries the tagline: "not a don story".

Arun envisioned the story during the 2015–2016 period. The plot idea was based on an anecdote during a Goan trip with his friend in 2015. He transferred his experience to an imaginary character and formed a story. Arun thought of casting a newcomer in the principal role then. After Ramaleela, Tomichan Mulakuppadam was interested in producing a film with Pranav in the lead role and asked Arun about any story that can be used. Tomichan was looking for a story which can cast either Mohanlal or Pranav in the lead role. Arun briefed the story of Irupathiyonnaam Noottaandu meant for Pranav, which he agreed to act. It was commissioned, and Arun himself developed the screenplay. The proposed Mohanlal film was scheduled in their next lineup.

=== Filming ===
Principal photography commenced on 27 July 2018 in Kanjirappilly, Kottayam district, with Abhinandan Ramanujam serving as the director of photography. Filming also took place on-location in Ernakulam and Pala in the following month. In September, the film was shifted to Vagamon for the second schedule. Pranav's surfing scenes were shot at the Bali island in Indonesia in the following month. Filming also took place at Goa and Hyderabad locations. In November, set photos taken from the film showed Pranav performing stunt scenes on a train, choreographed by Peter Hein. The Cochin Harbour Terminus and its near-by area was a location for filming held in November last week. The shooting was completed on 1 December 2018. The film was shot for two days at a set built at Varkala Beach for a late-night New Year bash scene before wrapping. Beside Hein, Supreme Sundar also worked as action choreographer in the film. Raju Sundaram and Sathish Krishnan were the dance choreographers.

== Soundtrack ==
The film features original background score and songs composed by Gopi Sundar and penned by B. K. Harinarayanan. The song "Aaraaro Ardhramayi", sung by Niranj Suresh and Kavya Ajit, was released on 12 January 2019. The songs were recorded at Sunsa Digital Workstation in Chennai and Kochi.

Irupathiyonnaam Noottaandu
No.	Title	Singer(s)	Length
1.	"Aaraaro Ardhramayi"	Niranj Suresh, Kavya Ajit
2.	"Indindirangal"	Najim Arshad
3.	"Konji Konji"	Divya S. Menon, Midhun Anand, Nikhil Mathew

== Release ==
Irupathiyonnaam Noottaandu was released in India and Gulf Cooperation Council territories on 25 January 2019 by Mulakuppadam Release. The full version of the film was digitally released on YouTube on 21 October 2019.

=== Promotion ===
The first-look poster featuring Pranav Mohanlal was released through social medias on 10 December 2018. On 13 December 2018, Dulquer Salmaan launched the first teaser of the film on Facebook. On 29 December 2018, a poster revealing newcomer Rachel David was launched online introducing her as the heroine of the film. In early January 2019, Gokul Suresh officially revealed that he will be seen in a small part in the film and shared a poster on Facebook. On 22 January 2019, the official trailer of the film was launched via Twitter by Suriya.

== Response ==
=== Critical reception ===
The film received mixed reviews upon release. Nowrunning rated 2.5 stars out of 5, saying "coupled with flawed execution, the consistent slipshod approach sullies 'Irupathiyonnam Noottandu'", adding "the visual effects in the climax are pretty far away from satisfying the sensibilities", but praised the "powerful and rich visuals" of Abinandhan Ramanujam. Regarding the lead, "Pranav moves along comfortably in the adventurous sequences than lending a confident touch to the character". Sify rated 2 stars out of 5, saying the movie "suffers from ordinary writing and unbelievably shoddy packaging". S.R. Praveen of The Hindu described the script as "incoherent and lacking novelty or surprises", and the visual effects as "below par" adding"this movie specialises in single shade characters who lack any depth". Regarding acting, Pranav "is expected to emote often, throwing him a challenge which he finds tough to live up to".
