= Pulimurugan (soundtrack) =

Soundtrack album by Gopi Sundar
- Released: 5 October 2016
- Recorded: 2016
- Genre: Feature film soundtrack
- Length: 10:22
- Language: Malayalam
- Label: Millennium Audios
- Producer: Tomichan Mulakuppadam

Gopi Sundar chronology
Majnu (2016)	Pulimurugan (2016)	Devi (2016)

Pulimurugan is the soundtrack album for the 2016 film of the same name composed by Gopi Sundar. The soundtrack runs for over ten minutes and has three tracks; a duet sung by K. J. Yesudas and K. S. Chithra, a solo by Vani Jairam, and a theme song by Sunder. The songs feature lyrics written by Rafeeq Ahammed, Murukan Kattakada, and B. K. Harinarayanan. The music album was released on 5 October 2016 in an event held at the Crowne Plaza hotel in Kochi.

== Development ==
Sunder announced in late December 2015, that the film would have two songs, with one of which would be a lullaby ("Manathe Marikurumbe") sung by S. Janaki and another song being a melody ("Kaadaniyum Kalchilambe") sung by Jassie Gift and Shreya Ghoshal. Janaki, however, announced her retirement from singing in the second half of 2016. The song was later sung by Vani Jairam, whereas "Kaadaniyum Kalchilambe" was recorded by K. J. Yesudas and K. S. Chithra—the former in his maiden association with Sunder. Including his discussions with Yesudas, the recording process was completed in one-and-a-half hours on 27 August 2016. The theme song starting with the line "Muruga Muruga" was written by Harinarayanan; its lyrics were written after finishing the composition. The songs were recorded in a studio in Ernakulam.

Unlike his previous films, where he would complete scoring the film within a month, Sunder, took three months for Pulimurugan and worked in two schedules. Without any short-notices, Vysakh gave Sunder enough time to compose the score. He composed while watching a rough version of the film before the final editing. At that time, the computer-generated imagery of the tiger was at its early stage and far from perfect, so Sunder had to envisage the tiger while composing for these scenes. The composition of score was completed on 11 September 2016, and the DTS pre-mixing of the music was done on 17 September at G Studio in AVM, Chennai.

== Marketing ==
The first music video from the film, "Kaadaniyum Kalchilambe" sung by Yesudas and Chithra, was released via YouTube on 14 September 2016—the day of the Hindu festival Thiruvonam. The song features Mohanlal and Mukherji enjoying their country life. On 11 October 2016, in response to audience demand, Sundar released the theme song attached with a video of the making of the film. The film's second music video, "Manathe Marikurumbe" sung by Jairam, was released on 27 October 2016.

== Track listing ==
No.	Title	Lyrics	Singer(s)	Length
1.	"Kaadaniyum Kalchilambe"	Rafeeq Ahamed	K. J. Yesudas, K. S. Chithra	3:57
2.	"Manathe Marikurumbe"	Murukan Kattakada	Vani Jairam	4:27
3.	"Pulimurugan Theme"	B. K. Harinarayanan	Gopi Sundar	2:38
Total length:				10:22

== Reception ==
Describing the song "Kaadaniyum Kalchilambe", Nivedita Mishra of Hindustan Times said, "It is a paean to marriage[...] Kaadaniyum Kalchilambe is a beautiful celebration of Kerala—so lush and so soothing to the eye and so lovingly captured by cinematographer Shaji Kumar". Anjana George of The Times of India also gave a positive review, highlighting its visuals and saying, "while beautifully showcasing the chemistry between Lal [Mohanlal] and Kamalini, the director has also tried to capture the magical splendour of forest. The lovely shades of green, yellow, orange and blue are being magnificently used in the visuals." However, Firstpost-based Rajesh Pandathil criticised it as "dull" and "repetitive" highlighting that it lacks the "novelty, excitement and magic" of Sundar's previous numbers.

Sanjith Sridharan of The Times of India wrote "Gopi Sundar is in top form with a brilliant accompaniment of rousing theme music that adds to the movie’s mass elements." Srivatsan S of India Today wrote "Pulimurugan doesn't have the space for mood-killing songs. Gopi Sundar is the most promising find in recent years. Pulimurugan solely lies on its striking background numbers, and Sundar just upped the crescendo to the maximum." Chinta Mary Anil of The News Minute felt that "the songs are largely forgettable, but the background score is sure to stay with you."

== Accolades ==
The songs "Kaadanayum Kaalchilambe" and "Maanathe Maarikurumbe" were selected among the 70 eligible songs contending for the Academy Award for Best Original Song nomination in the 90th Academy Awards, and the film score was also selected among the 141 eligible scores contending for the Academy Award for Best Original Score nomination.

Award	Date of ceremony	Category	Nominee(s)	Result	Ref.
Asiavision Awards	18 November 2016	Best Music Director	Gopi Sundar	Won	
Asiavision Awards	18 November 2016	Best Singer – Female	K. S. Chithra (for "Kaadaniyum Kalchilambe")	Won	
South Indian International Movie Awards	30 June 2017	Best Music Director	Gopi Sunder	Nominated	
South Indian International Movie Awards	30 June 2017	Best Playback Singer (Female)	K. S. Chithra (for "Kaadaniyum Kalchilambe")	Won	
Vanitha Film Awards	12 February 2017	Best Female Singer	Vani Jairam (for "Maanathe Marikurumbe")	Won	
