= Kunjaliyan =

- Film poster
- Directed by: Saji Surendran
- Written by: Krishna Poojappura
- Produced by: Tomichan Mulakuppadam
- Starring: Jayasurya; Ananya; Suraj Venjaramoodu; Vijayaraghavan
- Cinematography: Anil Nair
- Edited by: Manoj
- Music by: M.G. Sreekumar; Bijibal (Background Score)
- Production company: Mulakuppadam Films
- Distributed by: Mulakuppadam Films
- Release date: 6 January 2012
- Country: India
- Language: Malayalam
- Budget: ₹ 5.25 crore

Kunjaliyan (transl. Young Brother-in-law) is a 2012 Indian Malayalam-language comedy thriller film directed by Saji Surendran and written by Krishna Poojappura. The film features Jayasurya in the title role along with Ananya and Suraj Venjaramoodu in lead roles, with Vijayaraghavan, Ashokan, Jagadish, Manikuttan and Maniyanpilla Raju as the supporting cast. The songs are composed by M.G. Sreekumar and background score by Bijibal.

== Plot ==
Jayaraman is popularly known as Kunjaliyan (young brother-in-law) in Gopalapuram, a village on the Kerala–Tamil Nadu border. He is the younger brother of three sisters. The sisters have been caring for him as their own child since the death of their parents. Jayaraman was the pet of his sisters and was not interested in doing any job. He is lazy. Everything was perfect until the sisters got married. The brothers-in-law were not interested in Jayaraman, neither were his uncle and two aunts. One day, Jayaraman leaves Gopalapuram to become rich. Somehow, he reached Dubai and managed to get a job as a camel herder. Unfortunately, he got terminated from his job due to the global recession. He is forced to return to Gopalapuram but is not interested in returning to his village without being a millionaire.

Jayaraman is returning to his village considering the advice of Preman. He is shocked to see the warm welcome by his family members at the airport and everyone is trying to take their him to their home.

== Cast ==
- Jayasurya as Jayaraman (Kunjaliyan)
- Suraj Venjaramoodu as Preman, Jayaraman's best friend from Dubai
- Ananya as Maya, a teacher and Jayaraman's love interest
- Vijayaraghavan as Remanan, Jayaraman's eldest brother-in-law
- Jagadish as Sukumaran, Jayaraman's second brother-in-law
- Ashokan as Vishwan, Jayaraman's third brother-in-law
- Maniyan Pilla Raju as Vikrama Kurup, Jayaraman's uncle with two wives Kanakabaram and Mallika
- Bindu Panicker as Shyamala, Jayaraman's eldest sister
- Reshmi Boban as Pushpaletha, Jayaraman's second sister
- Thesni Khan as Prameela, Jayaraman's third sister
- Harisree Ashokan as Veeramanikandan, the Panchayath president of Gopalapuram
- Manikuttan as Vinayan, a money lender and Maya's cousin
- Kalaranjini as Kanakabaram, Vikraman's wife along with Mallika
- Geetha Vijayan as Mallika, Vikraman's wife along with Kanakabaram
- Kishore as Veeramani's assistant
- Shaju Sreedhar as Manikandadasan
- V. K. Sreeraman as Maya's father
- Narayanankutty as Minister Sadanandan
- Anand as Suresh Varma, the main antagonist
- Appa Haja as Vikram, Suresh's associate
- Kollam Ajith as Varma's henchman
- Kalabhavan Shajohn as Varma's lawyer
- Leena Nair as Manjari, Ramanan's sister

== Production ==
The film is Jayasurya and Surendran's fourth and comes after Four Friends, which met a mixed reception. The script was written by Krishna Poojappura. Anil Nair is the film's cinematographer, and the music is composed by M. G. Sreekumar. Shooting began in late September 2011, in Pollachi depicting the fictional town called Gopalapurram. The film was produced by Tomichan Mulakuppadam, under the company Mulakuppadam Films, with a budget of ₹ 3.25 crore.

== Box office ==
The film became a disaster at the box office.

== Soundtrack ==
Kunjaliyan

Soundtrack album by M. G. Sreekumar
- Released: 6 January 2012
- Recorded: 2011
- Genres: Feature film soundtrack Music Director M. G. Sreekumar
- Language: Malayalam

M. G. Sreekumar chronology
Arabiyum Ottakavum P. Madhavan Nairum (2011)	Kunjaliyan (2012)	Njanum Ente Familiyum (2012)

The soundtrack ofKunjaliyan is composed by M. G. Sreekumar and background score by Bijibal. The recording of the songs was in late August. Song mixing was done by Renjith Viswanathan.

Track listing
No.	Title	Singer(s)	Length
1.	"Chembazhukka"	K. J. Yesudas & Sujatha Mohan	4:39
2.	"Aadadum"	Akhila Anand, Nishad & Sreenath	4:47
3.	"Kunjaliya"	Afsal & Rimi Tomy	4:02
4.	"Chembazhukka ('Nitheesh.s.pillai')"	K. J. Yesudas	5:39
5.	"Theme Music (Instrumental)" (Bijibal)
