= Flash (2007 film) =

2007 film by Sibi Malayil

- Directed by: Sibi Malayil
- Written by: S. Bhasurachandran
- Produced by: Tomichan Mulakuppadam
- Starring: Mohanlal; Indrajith Sukumaran; Parvathy Thiruvothu
- Cinematography: Sajan Kalathil
- Edited by: Valsan Dicruz
- Music by: Gopi Sundar
- Production company: Mulakuppadam Films
- Distributed by: Mulakuppadam Release
- Release date: 25 December 2007
- Country: India
- Language: Malayalam

Flash is a 2007 Indian Malayalam-language psychological crime thriller film, directed by Sibi Malayil and written by S. Bhasurachandran. It was produced and distributed by Tomichan Mulakuppadam. The film stars Mohanlal, Indrajith Sukumaran and Parvathy Thiruvothu. The plot revolves around Dhwani, who has to go through some harrowing experiences, and her big, joint family. Flash was released on 25 December 2007.

== Plot ==
Priyan is a software engineer working with Dr. Mithun, a Mumbai-based Information Technology industrialist. Dr. Mithun Madhavan is a psychiatrist in reality. Priyan is in love with his uncle's daughter Dhwani who was brought up in Chennai. The story deals with the disturbing events in Dhwani's life and how Dr. Mithun helps her overcome those. Until her father menon gets murdered and police suspect dhwani however mithun proves her innocence with CI jacob chandy's help and proves bhadran as the suspect however bhadran reveals that he's a witness to menon's death.the perpetrator in fact is arunkumar priyan's friend after menon fought with arunkumar resulting in menon to be killed. Now mithun proving dhwani's innocence arun is taken to custody.

== Cast ==
- Mohanlal as Dr. Mithun Madhavan, psychiatrist
- Parvathy as Dhwani, a Chennai-born Malayali girl
- Indrajith Sukumaran as Priyan, a software engineer
- Jagathy Sreekumar as "Idea" Sasi
- Shamna Kasim as Nithya, Dhwani's friend
- Ponvannan as Muthashan
- Sai Kumar as Menon
- Siddique as CI of Police Jacob Chandy
- Susheelan as IG KRD Nambiar(voice dubbed)
- Manikuttan
- Suresh Krishna as Bhadran
- P. Sreekumar as N.R.B
- Vineeth Kumar as Arun Kumar
- Biyon as Balu
- Suraj Venjaramoodu as Vaidyar
- Bijukuttan as Ajayan, Assistant to Vaidyar
- Ambika Mohan as Dhwani's kin
- Lakshmipriya as Dhwani's kin
- Nisha Sarang as Dhwani's kin
- Sreelatha Namboothiri as Dhwani's kin
- Indulekha as Receptionist
- Cherthala Lalitha
- Parvati Melton as Mithun's wife (Cameo appearance)

== Production ==
The film was produced by Tomichan Mulakuppadam, under the banner of Mulakuppadam Films. The filming locations include Kozhikode, Kanhangad, and Kuala Lumpur.

== Music ==
Flash

Soundtrack album by Gopi Sundar
- Released: 27 November 2007
- Genre: Feature film soundtrack
- Label: Manorama Music

Gopi Sundar chronology
Mission 90 Days (2007)	Flash (2007)	Poi Solla Porom (2008)

The soundtrack of the film was composed by Gopi Sundar. The album features five songs which has been written by Rafeeq Ahamed.

Flash (Original Motion picture Soundtrack)
No.	Title	Singer(s)	Length
1.	"Arikil Nee"	Karthik	4:07
2.	"Nin Hridaya Mounam" (Male vocals)	Vineeth Sreenivasan	4:57
3.	"Pulari Pon Prave"	Anuradha Sriram, Jakes Bijoy	4:53
4.	"Minnal Kodiye"	Smitha Nishanth	3:38
5.	"Nin Hridaya Mounam" (Female vocals)	Gayatri Asokan	3:38
