= Anniyan =

2005 Indian film by Shankar

- Theatrical release poster
- Directed by: Shankar
- Screenplay by: Shankar
- Dialogues by: Sujatha
- Story by: Shankar
- Produced by: V. Ravichandran
- Starring: Vikram; Sadha
- Cinematography: Ravi Varman; V. Manikandan
- Visual effects by: Govardhan Vigraham
- Edited by: V. T. Vijayan
- Music by: Harris Jayaraj
- Production company: Oscar Films
- Distributed by: Oscar Films
- Release date: 17 June 2005
- Running time: 181 minutes
- Country: India
- Language: Tamil
- Budget: ₹26.38 crore
- Box office: ₹57 crore

Anniyan (/ənnɪjən/ transl. Stranger) is a 2005 Indian Tamil-language psychological action thriller film directed by Shankar and produced by V. Ravichandran. The film stars Vikram as a meek law-abiding lawyer who has dissociative identity disorder, and develops two other identities: a playboy fashion model, and a murderous vigilante seeking to eradicate corruption in India. The cast also includes Sadha, Prakash Raj, Vivek, Nedumudi Venu, and Nassar.

Shankar conceived the film in mid-2003 during the post-production period of his previous film Boys. He based the film on his own life experiences during his formative years when he was disturbed by what he saw around him and his eventual displeasure with the society. Pre-production for Anniyan began in November 2003 and principal photography in March 2004. The making of the film, which included numerous production delays, took 14 months. The film was shot at Hyderabad, Thanjavur, Viluppuram and Chennai. The song sequences were filmed in Mumbai, Malaysia, Amsterdam and Tenkasi. The film was notable for its recreation of the Tyagaraja Aradhana music festival and the extensive use of time slice photography in an action sequence.

Cinematographer V. Manikandan discontinued the project halfway through, until he was replaced with Ravi Varman. The technical departments were headed by V. T. Vijayan (editing), Sabu Cyril (production design), and Peter Hein (action choreography). The soundtrack was composed by Harris Jayaraj, who was in his first collaboration with the director. The film was touted as the director's magnum opus and was budgeted at ₹26.3 crore, making it the most expensive Indian film during the time of its release. Notably, it was the first South Indian film to obtain institutional finance, and it had the highest insurance coverage available for films at that time.

Anniyan was released on 17 June 2005 to positive reviews from critics and became a major commercial success, and in addition to winning a record breaking eight Filmfare Awards and six State Film Awards, it also won a National Award in the Special Effects category. The film became the second highest grossing Tamil film of the year, just below Chandramukhi.

== Plot ==
Ramanujam "Ambi" Iyengar is a highly principled but deeply frustrated consumer protection advocate residing in Thiruvallikeni, Chennai. He strictly adheres to civil laws and routinely attempts to prosecute public offenders; however, his legal efforts consistently fail due to systemic corruption and a lack of cooperative evidence. Met with public apathy and widespread indifference to his civic awareness campaigns, Ambi's repressed psychological rage triggers the manifestation of an alter ego named Anniyan. Operating as a grim-reaper-themed vigilante, Anniyan launches a website to compile a database of corrupt individuals. He systematically assassinates these wrongdoers using torturous execution methods inspired by the Garuda Purana, an ancient Hindu scripture detailing punishments in hell.

Ambi harbors an unspoken affection for his neighbor, Nandini, an aspiring Carnatic vocalist. When he finally gathers the courage to propose to her during the annual Tyagaraja Aradhana festival with the help of his friend, Sub-Inspector Chari, she flatly rejects him, citing his overbearing nature, constant nitpicking, and rigid perfectionism. Devastated, Ambi attempts suicide by drowning, though he backs out at the last second. The profound emotional trauma fractures his psyche further, creating a third personality: Remo, a charismatic, metrosexual fashion model. In stark contrast to Ambi, Remo's polished charm completely captivates Nandini, and the two quickly become engaged.

The personalities collide when Nandini attempts to purchase a plot of land for her dowry and intentionally undervalues the property to evade government stamp duty. While Ambi refuses to abet her white-collar crime, Remo takes her on a date later that evening. Mid-encounter, Remo abruptly transitions into Anniyan, who binds Nandini and prepares to execute her for corruption. Terrified, Nandini screams out for Ambi, who regains control of his body and collapses.

Nandini admits Ambi to NIMHANS, where the chief psychiatrist Dr. Vijaykumar diagnoses Ambi with Dissociative Identity Disorder (DID). Through recovered-memory therapy, the Vijaykumar uncovers a foundational childhood trauma. When Ambi was ten years old, he helplessly witnessed the electrocution and death of his younger sister, Vidya, caused directly by stagnant rainwater and a civic line worker's negligence. Vijaykumar discovers that while Anniyan and Remo possess full awareness of Ambi, Ambi remains completely oblivious to them. Vijaykumar determines that Remo will permanently dissolve once Nandini genuinely reciprocates Ambi's love, but warns that Anniyan will persist until society fully reforms. Nandini embraces Ambi's true self, causing Remo to vanish.

Concurrently, DCP Prabhakar and Chari spearhead the investigation into Anniyan's murders, deciphering the scriptural clues left at the crime scenes. Prabhakar is personally driven to neutralize the vigilante, as his older brother, a corrupt railway catering contractor, was murdered by Anniyan. During a high-profile public gathering, Anniyan makes a dramatic appearance to the press, defending his executions by asserting that India can only match the prosperity of developed nations if its citizenry adopts absolute personal accountability.

Using digital forensics to track Anniyan's IP address and analyzing facial recognition data, Prabhakar identifies Ambi as the killer and arrests him. During interrogation, Ambi passes a polygraph test, proving his genuine ignorance of the crimes. Enraged, Prabhakar brutally tortures Ambi, utilizing the exact methods from the Garuda Purana. The near-death agony forces Anniyan to surface. Ambi's psyche rapidly alternates between the two personas; he brutally assaults Prabhakar as Anniyan while weeping and begging for mercy as Ambi, all of which is covertly recorded by Chari.

When Ambi is taken to court and tried for the murders committed by Anniyan, Chari presents the footage he recorded, and Vijaykumar presents reports of Ambi's medical diagnosis. Deemed mentally unfit, Ambi is acquitted of criminal charges and remanded to a psychiatric facility.

Two years later, a seemingly cured Ambi is released, exhibiting a more relaxed, accommodating demeanor. He marries Nandini and embarks on their honeymoon. While traveling by train, Ambi spots a heavily intoxicated passenger, the exact line worker whose negligence caused Vidya's death. Ambi covertly hurls him from the speeding train to his death while concealing the incident from Nandini, revealing that he and Anniyan have achieved a seamless, symbiotic equilibrium.

== Cast ==
- Vikram as Ramanujam "Ambi" Iyengar / Anniyan / Remo
  - Master Hari as young Ambi
- Sadha as Nandhini Krishnan (voice dubbed by Kaniha), Ambi's love interest
- Vivek as SI Chari, Ambi's friend and Prabhakar's assistant
- Prakash Raj as DCP Prabhakar IPS
- Nedumudi Venu as Parthasarathy Iyengar (Voice dubbed by S. N. Surendar), Ambi's father
- Nassar as Dr Vijay Kumar, doctor at NIMHANS
- Cochin Haneefa as Ramanathan, a driver who is later killed by Anniyan
- Kalabhavan Mani as Ponnambalam, a ruthless landlord who charges extortionate rent rates.
- Charle as a drunk wastrel
- Shanmugarajan as Chockalingam, Prabhakar's older brother
- Saurabh Shukla as Ethirajan Naidu, a factory owner who produces faulty brake wires
- Yana Gupta as a club dancer in the item number "Kaadhal Yaanai"
- Manobala as Raja, a Travelling ticket examiner (TTE)
- Shanthi Williams as Susheela Iyengar
- Neelu as Ananthanarayanan
- Sriranjani as Janaki
- Vatsala as Lakshmi
- Mohan Vaidya as Krishnan
- Baby Divya Nagesh as Vidya, Ambi's younger sister

== Production ==
=== Pre-production ===
During the making of his Hindi film directorial debut Nayak starring Anil Kapoor in early 2001, director S. Shankar had conceived a science fiction film titled Robot. A futuristic techno-thriller set in 22nd century Chennai, the film was to star Kamal Haasan and Preity Zinta. (Note: According to a 2004 report by The Hindu, the film was supposedly set in 2200 A.D. whereas a 2008 report by Sify claims that, according to the director's original one-line script, the film was set in 3000 A.D.) However, after completing a photo-shoot featuring the two, the production was shelved due to various reasons, including Haasan's unavailability of dates and creative differences with the director. Shankar postponed the project indefinitely and made the coming of age film, Boys (2003). (Note: He would later renew Robot as Enthiran (2010) with Rajinikanth and Aishwarya Rai featuring in the lead.) When the post-production work of Boys was underway, Shankar was awaiting the return of its composer A. R. Rahman, who was then outside India, to complete the background score. In the meantime, Shankar had an idea for a storyline and called Vikram, who expressed enthusiasm for the subject.

=== Development ===
As a common man, so many happenings in society disturb me. These leave scars on my mind. In fact, they are my creative spur. I react to social happenings on an imaginative plane.

— Shankar, on how the film evolved.

Following the release of Boys in August 2003, Shankar began work on his next directorial venture, entitled Anniyan. It was initially thought to be Shankar's pet project Robot revived with a new title, but this was later proven not to be correct. Shankar said the film was his "dream project" and disclosed that it would be a racy, fantasy-thriller. When questioned on how the idea behind the film had come to him, the director revealed, "The seeds of all my movies were sown when I was young, long before I started making movies. So many things disturbed me, and these stayed with me. Those were the seeds. I make films based on them."

With the highest production value among Tamil films of its time, the film was touted to be the director's magnum opus and was labelled "the most eagerly awaited film of the year" by the media. The film deals with a person having dissociative identity disorder, commonly known as "multiple personality disorder" (MPD) or "split personality syndrome". It was compared to Chandramukhi, released two months before, as it also focused on a character with the same syndrome.

=== Casting ===
To portray the lead character, Shankar needed a performer who could play an action hero. He chose Vikram as he felt that the actor, in addition to being a performer, had the image of an action hero. While his casting was made public in a November 2003 news report announcing the project's inception, the director revealed that Vikram was added to the cast in mid-2003 and refuted theories that the actor's casting was to capitalise on his new-found popularity following his success at the National Film Awards, where he won the National Film Award for Best Actor for his performance in the film Pithamagan (2003). Stating that Vikram was selected for the lead role months before the theatrical release of Pithamagan, Shankar added, "I don't look at actors that way." He further remarked that Vikram was the "life and soul" of Anniyan.

The heroine role of a "devoted Iyengar Brahmin girl" was originally offered to Aishwarya Rai Bachchan, who was too busy to accommodate production dates. After months of waiting for her call sheet, Shankar eventually offered the role to Sadha. Expressing hope that it would be "an important movie" in her career, Sadha accepted the offer, working on the film for 120 days, adding, "I have a major role to play in Anniyan. There are few heavy portions involving me in the movie that I have given my best." She considered being a part of a Shankar film, especially during the early stages of her career, as a "god's gift" and a "once-in-a-lifetime experience". However, when offered similar roles following the film's success, she refused to be typecast and stated, "I am now looking for roles where my creative potential is tapped. I don't want to be part of such cinema where all one has to do is dance around trees."

Vivek, Prakash Raj, Nedumudi Venu and Nassar appear in supporting roles. Mohan Vaidhya, a carnatic vocalist and occasional actor, plays a minuscule role as Sadha's father Krishna. Malavika Avinash was approached to play Vikram's mother; she rejected the offer, stating, "I am too young to do a screen mom and too old to be a heroine!" Cochin Haneefa, Charle, Kalabhavan Mani, Shanmugarajan and Saurabh Shukla make cameo appearances as delinquent citizens. Haneefa played an indifferent car owner who refuses to help an accident victim as he does not want his "brand new car" to be soiled with blood. Following Haneefa's death in February 2010, Vikram recalled the actor's appearance in the film and said, "Though he'd come only in a few scenes no one could miss him. For roles that have some ambiguity about whether it's a good guy or a bad guy, he is one of the best choices. Until the end, one cannot really guess if he'll end up being good or bad." Comedian and character artiste Charle played an unnamed wastrel and alcoholic who extorts money from his ageing parents for his expenses and is considered by Anniyan to be a liability to society. Charle was instructed by Shankar, "People should see only the character. Only later should they realise that it was Charle."

The role of the younger Ambi was played by child actor Hari Prashanth alias Viraj. When he came to the recording studio to voice his lines, he was accompanied by his father S. N. Surendar, a singer and dubbing artiste. Shankar recognised Surendar and asked him to lend his voice for Nedumudi Venu, as the latter was a Malayali. In the 2004 comedy film Aethirree, which featured Sadha in the female lead, Kanika played the second lead role of a "naughty" Brahmin girl. Shankar, apparently impressed with Kanika's performance in the film, asked her to attend a voice test. When the film-makers preferred Kanika's accent and modulation among the thirty females whose voices were tested, she was selected to dub for Sadha's Brahmin role.

=== Technical crew ===
The film was produced by V. Ravichandran under his own film production and distribution company 'Oscar Films' (presently 'Aascar Films'). The screenplay was written by Shankar and the film had dialogue written by writer Sujatha. Shankar retained Sabu Cyril, his production designer from Boys, to handle the set design; the scenes were edited by V. T. Vijayan. While the action sequences were orchestrated by Peter Hein and assisted by Stunt Silva, the dance sequences were choreographed by Raju Sundaram, Kalyan, and Ahmed Khan. Film institute student Prabhu Raja Chozhan, who would later turn director with Karuppampatti (2013), joined Shankar as his protégé and worked as his assistant.

Shankar, who grew up admiring the works of cinematographer P. C. Sreeram in films like Nayakan (1987), Agni Natchathiram (1988), and Idhayathai Thirudathe (1989), desired to collaborate and was in talks with him to handle the photography. (Note: Earlier, Sreeram had turned down Shankar's offer to work in Indian (1996) as he did not want to affect the career chances of his former assistant Jeeva, who was the cinematographer in Shankar's directorials until that point.) While Sreeram was intent on working on Anniyan, he could not accept the offer due to prior commitments. It was initially reported in the media that Sreeram had been recruited; however, Shankar chose V. Manikandan as the director of photography, impressed with his work in Main Hoon Na (2004). Manikandan had earlier collaborated with Shankar when he shot the music video of the song "Secret of Success" in Boys. Manikandan gave six months of bulk dates for the project; but, when the production was troubled by delays, Shankar demanded three more months to complete the film. Manikandan walked out in October 2004, citing scheduling conflicts, and Shankar replaced him with Ravi Varman.

During the casting stage of Boys, the film's cinematographer Ravi K. Chandran was temporarily unavailable and his then-assistant Ravi Varman handled the camera to film Genelia D'Souza's makeup test. Subsequently, Varman nurtured a desire to work with Shankar. Before Shankar commenced work on Anniyan, Varman expressed his desire to work on the film and was hopeful of landing the assignment. He was disappointed when Shankar recruited Manikandan for the project. However, when Manikandan abandoned the project after completing almost half the film, Shankar asked Varman to shoot the remaining portions of the film. Varman had committed to work in Bengali director Buddhadeb Dasgupta's next film, on which work was scheduled to begin shortly; he dropped out of it to accept Shankar's offer and termed working on Anniyan "a dream come true". The film credits both Manikandan and Ravi Varman as cinematographers in title credits.

=== Preparation and character looks ===
I observe a lot in life and it helps perform better. Illnesses like MPD have a clinical history and you will have to stick to it to avoid an 'atypical' performance. I studied the literature on MPD and was clear about retaining the identity of each character—be it the proverbial Ambi, the rampaging Anniyan, or the cool Remo.

— Vikram, on the mental make-up and preparation required to portray the role.

Vikram as the character Anniyan, a psychotic serial killer, which won him the Filmfare Award for Best Actor

Vikram allotted 18 months and 190 days of his call sheet for the film, including 165 days of bulk dates spread across six months. Speaking on the extent of his involvement in the filmmaking process, Vikram said, "Before beginning the film, I was totally involved in the research and preparation, but once on the sets, I go by what the director says." He further clarified that he discussed every shot with Shankar, went for re-takes where necessary to make the scenes better, and gave suggestions, but left the "ultimate verdict" to the director. Disclosing that, among the three shades to his character, he found playing Ambi to be the toughest, he reasoned, "Because as a hero you are not used to being a wimp on screen. It's difficult digesting getting beaten up." In contrast, being a graduate in English literature, he found playing Remo much easier and more in his comfort zone.

In an interview with Gulf News, Vikram spoke of the challenges in portraying all three characters while wearing the same costumes. He said, "I love such challenges. [...] Although the costume defined each of the three characters in Anniyan, there were scenes where Ambi would suddenly become Remo and Remo would become Anniyan. There I made it dramatic to bring out each character." He credited his wife Shailaja Balakrishnan, a psychologist, for helping him in fleshing out the character of Ambi, a person who has multiple personality disorder. In a conversation with film critic Baradwaj Rangan, Shailaja recalled the times the film was being made and spoke of Vikram, saying, "I felt we should live in two houses. It's not easy to live with a man who can get that eccentric, an actor who wants to be that difficult on himself. I wouldn't say he becomes the character, but there's definitely some kind of internalisation." Vikram confessed that he had a tough time during the film's making, as playing different characters affected him, and he found himself going mad. He added that he would take a break after a 15-day shoot and watch the pigeons on his terrace as a way of dealing with the pressure.

Vikram grew a tummy to portray Ramanujam while he sported a "macho look" for Anniyan. He also grew his hair long in preparation for his role and rejected other film offers to maintain the continuity in his looks. Together with his character looks and those that he sported in the song sequences, Vikram appears in the film in 18 different getups. Vikram's look in the film was created by make-up artiste Banu. For those parts that show him as metrosexual Remo, he coloured his hair in streaks of copper and blonde. Unwilling to reveal his 'new look' until the film was ready, Vikram avoided the media despite winning the aforementioned National Award for the year 2003. Meanwhile, Sadha's make-up and hair styling were done by Mumbai-based celebrity stylist Ojas M. Rajani.

=== Filming ===
The film was officially launched with a traditional puja and muhurat shot on 5 March 2004 at AVM Studios, Chennai. The studio was decorated with life-sized stills showing Vikram in three distinct looks, "a voodoo hunter, a pious 'sami' and a bubbling youth"; this led the media to speculate that Vikram would be playing either a triple role or a character with three shades. The film's caption was 'He who comes from hell is not afraid of hot ashes'. During the launch function, Shankar expressed hope of completing the film in six months and releasing the film on 12 November 2004, coinciding with the Diwali festival. However, the production, which began shortly afterwards in March 2004, was marred by several delays and took 14 months to complete. The film was shot in Amsterdam, Malaysia, Mumbai, Hyderabad, Tenkasi, Thanjavur, Villupuram and Chennai.

The film features a scene at the Thiruvaiyaru Thyagaraja Utsavam. The Utsavam is a week-long music festival which commemorates the 18th-century saint-composer Tyagaraja, revered as one of the greatest composers of carnatic music, and is held annually at his resting place in Thiruvaiyaru, Thanjavur. With the use of sets, the art department recreated the Tyagaraja Aradhana near Mahabalipuram in Tamil Nadu. For filming the scene, the crew recreated a performance of the famous kriti "Jagadānanda kārakā", the first of the five Pancharatna Kriti compositions of Tyagaraja, as performed during Tyagaraja Aradhana. The aradhana, held on the fifth day of the festival, witnesses experts of carnatic music from across the world converging at his samaadhi, where they sing his pancharatna kritis in unison as an homage to the saint.

Shankar approached violin maestro Kunnakudi Vaidyanathan, a regular participant at the actual event, to conceive and orchestrate the sequence. Vaidyanathan was serving as the secretary of Sri Thyagabrahma Mahotsava Sabha, the committee which organises the aradhana. The scene features him in a cameo and was shot in June 2004 at a studio in Chennai. Realistic sets were erected to resemble the actual venue and leading carnatic vocalists Sudha Ragunathan, Sirkazhi G. Sivachidambaram, O. S. Arun, P. Unni Krishnan and instrumentalists such as violinist A. Kanyakumari and mridangam expert Umayalpuram K. Sivaraman were recruited to add a touch of authenticity. The two-minute scene was brought to life in "painstaking detail". The sequence was much talked about and well appreciated.

The camera setup employed for the time slice technique (Note: According to Shankar, time-slicing is about numerous stills on a camera system consisting of 120 cameras, a special ring and precise control in post-production to achieve a frozen-time effect.)

In a fight sequence, Anniyan encounters about a hundred martial artists inside the fictional International Martial Arts School, Vodao. About a dozen stuntmen crashed down from the balcony, injuring themselves badly after the rope which they were tied to gave in. The action sequence was shot using 120 cameras for employing the time slice photography technique, a visual effect known as "bullet time" and popularised by the American film The Matrix (1999), to achieve the frozen-time effect. Shankar had earlier toyed with the idea of time-slice and tried it while filming the song "Ale Ale" in his Boys. While the time-freeze sequence in Boys was achieved by the linking of 60–62 cameras to attain a 180° rotation, Anniyan employed 120–122 cameras for a 270° rotation.

The scene where Anniyan addresses a huge gathering was shot in a stadium in Hyderabad. As he speaks to the audience, the lights turn on and off in the background. Speaking on how the sequence was filmed, Ravi Varman said that they decided not to light up the entire stadium as they felt it would have looked flat. As the sequence was important to the film, he juxtaposed the stadium with light and shadow so that it would look different. During the pre-climax scene, when Ambi is held in custody and enquired by Prabhakar, Ambi's persona keeps switching between the characters Ambi and Anniyan. Vikram claims to have completed the sequence in a single take. For the scene where Remo courts Nandini, a chemical tube brought from Malaysia was used to measure how attractive a person is.

=== Song sequences ===
The semi-classical song "Kumari" was the first of the scenes to be shot. Filmed at the World Flower Show in May 2004, the sequence was picturised in a large tulip garden located in the city of Vijfhuizen near Amsterdam, Netherlands. The song was shot during the Netherlands International Flower Show called Floriade, a decennial event which was held between 10 April and 20 October 2004. While the crew had planned to film another song at a garden in Keukenhof, they were denied permission by the authorities as a previous Indian film crew had damaged the habitat a few weeks before. (Note: However, according to Aparna Karthikeyan of The Hindu and a 2011 report by Sify, the song was shot in the tulip gardens of Keukenhof.)

The song features the lead pair singing amidst a flower farm as mridangam and flute players accompany them in the background. As part of their roles, the male supporting actors who appear in the song were required to wear a panjakkacham and angavastram, leaving most of their body exposed to the freezing cold. The shoot began as early as 5:30 AM and the locals, who thought they should be out of their mind to be dressed so, came up to them and warned that they might freeze to death.

"Iyengaru Veetu", a semi-classical song, begins with a prelude of the Pancharatna Kriti "Jagadānanda kārakā". The actual song, which follows later, was picturised on a set erected at AVM Studios made to look like an old traditional Iyengar home in Thanjavur. The song was shot extravagantly, with the lead pair and the dozens of support dancers sporting rich, colourful costumes.

In December 2004, a ten-day shoot was held in Mumbai for the item number "Kadhal Yaanai" featuring Vikram alongside a top model, whose identity was initially undisclosed to generate curiosity. It was later revealed to be Czech-based model Yana Gupta. Filmed by Ravi Varman and choreographed by Ahmed Khan, the song was filmed like a fashion show where Vikram and Yana Gupta wear fashionable clothes and sashay along a ramp. The song was filmed on a set erected in a studio to resemble a famous night-spot in London.

The track "Kannum Kannum Nokia", a peppy and trendy love duet choreographed by Raju Sundaram, was picturised on the lead pair and had them wearing costumes made entirely of designer labels. The song was picturised in Malaysia at the Kuala Lumpur International Airport and Petronas Towers. The song, filmed during the night, was reportedly the first song to be shot at the airport. Ravi Varman revealed in an interview that the song was shot like a commercial. The song was also filmed at the Nokia Headquarters in Espoo, Finland.

The folk song "Andangkaaka" was shot in a village near Sengottai. For filming the song, a huge set was erected to resemble a village. The sets were visualised and created by Sabu Cyril, the film's art director. Shankar adopted a village near Tenkasi and Sabu Cyril painted all the houses, roads, rocks, and even a bridge in varied colours. They then hired hundreds of lorries and old model ambassador cars and painted faces on them. The faces of actors were painted on rock mountains. The lead pair were joined by hundreds of dancers and the total cost of the song worked out to ₹1 crore. In all, 350 houses were painted.

=== Post-production ===
In the narrative, Ambi is referred to the website, www.anniyan.com. Shankar envisioned that the website would take visitors through all the punishments that await sinners in hell. For designing the website, Shankar wanted to recreate hell and approached the Visual Computing Labs (VCL) of Tata Elxsi, a Mumbai-based company with which he had collaborated earlier for the song "Girlfriend" in Boys. The team at VCL conceptualised and created a 'hell' in 3d animation with the punishments taken from ancient scriptures. They also designed a grim reaper astride his bull who guides visitors through hell. Pankaj Khandpur, creative director of VCL said, "We tried to stay true to the scriptures, while creating imagery that wasn't too gory. [...] an interesting project since we had to visualise it all without any reference point." The animation was done in a span of three months.

VCL also did the CGI for a "cosmic zoom" scene, where the camera zooms from beyond the clouds to the streets of Chennai city, which no real camera can achieve. Aerial views and paintings of the city were stitched together along with computer generated images (CGI) of clouds to create the long, one-piece camera zoom. Animator and special effects designer L. I. Kannan, who would later turn director with the long-delayed period film Karikalan with Vikram in the lead, also worked on the special effects. Meanwhile, the special effects for the time-slice sequence were rendered by Big Freeze in London.

The scene where Anniyan addresses a packed audience in Nehru Stadium was filmed with the space empty. The crowd was created through visual effects using crowd multiplication methods. The VFX for the sequence was done under the supervision of visual effects consultant Zameer Hussain of Land Marvel Animation Studios, Chennai. The scene, in which hundreds of buffaloes chase down a delinquent car owner into an abandoned sand quarry and trample him to death, was accomplished through CGI using just one buffalo. The CG work was supplied by Jayakumar and V. Srinivas Mohan of the Chennai-based firm, Indian Artists Computer Graphics. Srinivas and his team had earlier worked with Shankar in Boys. Speaking of the sequence, Srinivas quipped, "The animals are lethargic and listless in their movements. Nothing can make them agile."

== Themes and influences ==
The storyline in Anniyan is typical of Shankar's yen for showcasing society's ills and targets the inept, rules-flouting public. The film sheds light on the increasing social apathy and public negligence, and attempts to address these issues which plague the society and hamper the development of India. S. Anand of Outlook noted that most of Shankar's films portray the hero as a "one-man agent of change" and cited, "From the neo-Nazi character Kamal Haasan in Indian to his last film Anniyan, featuring a schizophrenic Brahmin serial killer who butchers 'wrongdoers', Shankar has always offered fascist-fantastic solutions to what he perceives as social ills resulting from typical governmental inertia."

In an interview with The Hindu, Shankar elaborated on the message he conveys through the film:

I have travelled to many parts of the globe, especially the developed countries, and I am fascinated by the rapid strides that they have made in all fields. But back home, I am upset to see the neglect, poverty, and the laid back approach of our youngsters. I often think that we are a lazy country. [...] My story is about a person who tries to bring (about) a change within our society. The issue that I am trying to solve is inherent weakness within our society and some motivation to move forward like other nations.

Following the release of the trailer on 7 May 2005, the film was believed to be inspired by the 1886 Robert Louis Stevenson novel, Strange Case of Dr Jekyll and Mr Hyde. Upon the film's release, The Hindu drew parallels between it and the 1998 novel Tell Me Your Dreams by Sidney Sheldon. Shankar denied that the film was inspired by Tell Me Your Dreams, claiming that he knew of the novel only after completing the script. Sify compared the character of Ambi to the protagonist of The Mask (1994), a film about a "mild mannered guy changing into a one-man army, craving to see natural justice realised".

The methods of punishment meted out to the sinners by Anniyan in the film is based on Garuda Purana, a Vaishnavite purana which speaks of life after death and punishments for wrongdoers.

== Music ==
The album marked Shankar's first collaboration with Harris Jayaraj; all his previous directorial ventures had A. R. Rahman composing the music. As Rahman was busy with his debut Broadway musical Bombay Dreams and had also signed up for another musical, Lord of the Rings, Rahman and Shankar decided to part ways. In early 2004, Harris Jayaraj went on a trip to Phuket Islands in Thailand for some inspiration for the album; he was accompanied by Shankar and Vairamuthu. Eventually, the three songs penned by the lyricist were composed on the island. The visit took place much before the tragic 2004 tsunami struck the countries bordering the Indian Ocean and wreaked havoc. In a chat with Shankar, Harris Jayaraj said "the music was a challenge because the film was a mix of genres – action, comedy, thriller. In essence, it was a cock-mocktail .." Harris Jayaraj commenced the film's re-recording in April 2005 and took more than a month to complete it, delaying the film's release. The soundtrack album features six tracks, including theme music; the lyrics for the songs were written by Vairamuthu, Na. Muthukumar, and Kabilan. The album was released as a soft launch on 13 May 2005.

== Release ==
The film cleared the censors without any cuts and was rated "U" (Universal) by the Central Board of Film Certification. While Shankar had hoped to release the film on Diwali 2004, there were numerous production delays which postponed the release date through early 2005. While production was completed in March 2005, the re-recording (which began in April) took more time than anticipated, lasting nearly 45 days with Harris Jayaraj being blamed for further delays. After the film was postponed from 20 May 2005, and later, from 27 May 2005, the film was finally scheduled for 10 June 2005. But Shankar released it a week later, on 17 June 2005, as he considered 8 as his lucky number (1+7 yielding 8).

The film was dubbed into other South Indian languages and was released simultaneously in Tamil Nadu, Andhra Pradesh, Karnataka, and Kerala. The film was also released in key overseas countries like the United States, the United Kingdom, Australia, Germany, Malaysia, and Singapore. The film was released with 404 prints in Tamil and Telugu alone. Later, the film was dubbed into French by Paramount Pictures. Reportedly, Anniyan is the first Indian film to be dubbed into French and released in French-speaking countries worldwide by Columbia Tristar. The film was further dubbed and released in Hindi as Aparichit: The Stranger on 19 May 2006. At a private screening held a day before its Hindi theatrical release, the film received a "warm reception". Aparachitudu was rereleased on 17 May 2024 in Andhra Pradesh and Telangana.

== Reception ==
=== Critical reception ===
Malathi Rangarajan of The Hindu said that the film works as it melds an interesting screen line with racy action. She also noted that the story resembled Shankar's Indian (1996) a lot while also bearing semblance to his Gentleman (1993). She remarked that the story and screenplay deserved to be lauded for its "ingenious sparks in narration" but problems arose with respect to its plausibility. She then declared, " [...] some of the best camera shots, stunts, and locations on a mind-boggling scale have been showcased. If you enjoy magnificence in cinema you will like this Anniyan." Krishnakumar wrote for Rediff.com that learning from the debacle of Boys, the director went back to his strength by taking a social theme, spicing it up and serving the perfect commercial fare. He added that in trying to explain multiple personality disorder in the simplest of terms, the director has only succeeded to a certain extent, as a majority of viewers who are not that well informed might not even comprehend what is being said.

Visual Dasan of Kalki wrote that both the art director Sabu Cyril and composer Harris Jayaraj lent their hand to Shankar's grand visions, adding that everyone could bow down to Shankar's social responsibility of exaggerating colorful entertainment and sensitising the fan by watching Anniyan once, while simultaneously appreciating Vikram for his performance in three different characters. In addition, he said that Anniyan's transformation reminded him of Jim Carrey from The Mask. Dasan also appreciated Shankar for perfectly using other actors wherever necessary. Labelling the film as a "must see", a reviewer at Sify acclaimed the film, saying it holds the viewers riveted with its racy narration, a relevant message backed with technical wizardry, never-seen before colourful song picturisation and particularly the performance of Vikram. Yet, the reviewer also criticised the film, saying it was too lengthy and the story too thin on logic.

Reviewing Aparichithudu, the Telugu version of the film, The Hindu said that it was watchable. Regarding the Hindi version of the film, Raja Sen of Rediff.com derided the pathetic dubbing, saying that it was refreshing and watchable, despite boasting of enough masala to make the viewers sneeze. He concluded his review by saying, "Overall, Aparichit is a slickly made, well-paced actioner that works quite well, despite the dub. The film is engaging and crisply scripted, and the action is never too excessive, lightened by jokes and general tomfoolery that never offensively interrupts the actual plot." Nitin V Nambiar of The Times of India criticised the "poor recording" and "strictly average" dubbing, noting that Shankar's direction chooses "palatability over plausibility".

== Awards ==
Following the commercial success of the Telugu version Aparichitudu, which was a runaway hit in Andhra Pradesh, Shankar was felicitated by Sri Venkateswara Social and Cultural Organisation (SVESCO) of Tirupati and was conferred the title 'Darsaka Brahma'. In a conversation with athlete Shiny Wilson, actor Jayaram remarked, "Anniyan was a runaway hit in Kerala. But if a Malayalam star had tried out an Anniyan-kind of role with a weird hairdo, it would have been a disaster!"

The film received numerous awards and nominations. The film won National Award in the Special Effects category. Anniyan became the fourth film directed by Shankar to receive that award; the other three are Kaadhalan (1994), Indian (1996), and Jeans (1998). It also won eight out of the total 15 awards awarded by Filmfare for the best of Tamil cinema.

| Award | Ceremony | Category | Recipients | Result | Ref. |
|---|---|---|---|---|---|
| National Film Awards | 53rd National Film Awards | Best Special Effects | Tata Elxsi | Won | |
| Filmfare Awards South | 53rd Filmfare Awards South | Best Film | Anniyan | Won | |
| Filmfare Awards South | 53rd Filmfare Awards South | Best Actor | Vikram | Won | |
| Filmfare Awards South | 53rd Filmfare Awards South | Best Actress | Sadha | Nominated | |
| Filmfare Awards South | 53rd Filmfare Awards South | Best Director | Shankar | Won | |
| Filmfare Awards South | 53rd Filmfare Awards South | Best Lyricist | Vairamuthu | Won | |
| Filmfare Awards South | 53rd Filmfare Awards South | Best Art Director | Sabu Cyril | Won | |
| Filmfare Awards South | 53rd Filmfare Awards South | Best Music Director | Harris Jayaraj | Won | |
| Filmfare Awards South | 53rd Filmfare Awards South | Best Action Director | Peter Hein | Won | |
| Filmfare Awards South | 53rd Filmfare Awards South | Best Cinematographer | Ravi Varman, V. Manikandan | Won | |
| Tamil Nadu State Film Awards | Tamil Nadu State Film Award – 2005 | Best Film | Anniyan | Won (Second Best) | |
| Tamil Nadu State Film Awards | Tamil Nadu State Film Award – 2005 | Best Villain | Prakash Raj | Won | |
| Tamil Nadu State Film Awards | Tamil Nadu State Film Award – 2005 | Best Director | Shankar | Won | |
| Tamil Nadu State Film Awards | Tamil Nadu State Film Award – 2005 | Best Comedian | Vivek | Won | |
| Tamil Nadu State Film Awards | Tamil Nadu State Film Award – 2005 | Best Music Director | Harris Jayaraj | Won (also for Ghajini) | |
| Tamil Nadu State Film Awards | Tamil Nadu State Film Award – 2005 | Best Male Dubbing Artist | S. N. Surendar | Won | |

== Economics ==
=== Pre-release ===
By the time the production was nearing completion, the trade sources had estimated the film to cost around ₹12–15 crore; but, as often happens with films directed by Shankar, the budget was overshot. It was finally made on a budget of ₹26.38 crore (worth ₹141.43 crore in 2021 prices); it was touted as the most expensive South Indian film to ever be made during the time of its release.

Anniyan was the first Tamil film and the first in South India to get institutional finance. For its institutional finance, it procured a sum of ₹9.5 crore from IDBI Bank. Anniyan was insured by United India Insurance for ₹15 crore, thereby making it the first South Indian film to be insured and also the largest insurance cover extended to a South Indian film at that time.

=== Distribution ===
With the amount of hype the film generated in the media, theatre owners eagerly came forward and offered hefty prices as Minimum Guarantee (MG). (Note: The Economic Times defines 'Minimum Guarantee' as an initial sum that is paid to the producer by the distributor irrespective of how the film performs. A revenue sharing arrangement is worked out, whereby the producer will get a portion of the profits that the distributor makes.) In Tamil Nadu, funds amounting to ₹12 crore were gathered as MG and advance. The MG raised through audio rights and movie distribution to theatres in Andhra Pradesh, Kerala, Karnataka, and overseas fetched a combined sum of ₹22.4 crore. The film was distributed and released throughout Tamil Nadu by Aascar Films.

The rights for Aparichithudu, the Telugu-dubbed version, was bought by a producer for an all-time record price. Meanwhile, the film was sold in Kerala for ₹1.3 crore, which was again a record for a Tamil film there. The US rights were bought by the distribution house Bharat Creations. With the theatrical rights and pre-release booking, the trade circuit predicted that the film would recover its cost within ten days of its release.

=== Box office ===
The advance booking for the film began on 14 June 2005 across Tamil Nadu and received overwhelming response from the audience, which the trade circuit felt was "phenomenal". The film took a "historic opening" worldwide and set multiple records at the box office. A day after release, the film was touted as a hit. In its opening weekend (17–19 June), Anniyan grossed ₹50.24 lakh from only six multiplexes in Chennai and reached #1 position at the Chennai box-office. In Sathyam Cinemas alone, the film grossed ₹14 lakh, the highest ever three-day opening from a single multiplex in South India.

A week after release, the film grossed more than ₹1 crore in Chennai, ₹27 lakh in Sathyam Cinemas, ₹71 lakh from 10 prints in Salem, and netted ₹41 lakh in Coimbatore which were all box office records. And beyond Tamil Nadu, the film earned the distributors ₹1.27 crore from Nizam in Andhra, ₹50 lakh in Karnataka, and ₹10 lakh from 3 screens in Mumbai. The trade pundits estimated that V. Ravichandran would get a distributor's share of ₹8–10 crore in its first week from cinemas across Tamil Nadu. A week after its release, the Telugu-dubbed version Aparichithudu was declared a hit in Andhra Pradesh. Distributor Karunakara Reddy of Megha Films in Hyderabad quipped, "Aparichitudu has taken an opening just like a Telugu superstar film and should collect a distributor's share of Rs. 5–7 crore for the Nizam area alone." In Kerala, Anniyan released in 35 screens across the state, receiving a "record opening" for a Tamil film and became the first Tamil film to get a distributors' share of ₹62 lakh in its first week. A fortnight after its release, the film was labelled a "super hit" in Tamil cinema's half-yearly report compiled by film trade analyst for The Hindu Sreedhar Pillai.

In an exactly six-week theatrical run, Anniyan netted ₹1.05 crore with a distributor's share of around ₹52 lakh. It was an "all India record for collections, the highest share in least number of days from any theatre in India." However, in Tamil Nadu, collections began dropping five weeks after its release and it was estimated that the film would earn a share of ₹16 crore. In September 2005, the film's gross earnings surpassed the US$2 million milestone. At the completion of a 50-day run at Sathyam Cinemas, Anniyan "recorded the highest 50 days collection for a Tamil film from a single screen in the world" earning ₹1.12 crore.

Anniyan was declared a blockbuster at the close of the year and, together with Chandramukhi, earned an estimated gross of ₹110 crore worldwide. The film also collected a distributor's share of ₹2 crore. In Andhra Pradesh, Aparichitudu was named the biggest hit of 2005. The film did better business than straight Telugu films. It was the highest grosser among all Telugu films released that year. It also prompted producers in the Telugu film industry, which had hit a rough patch following a spate of box-office failures, to acquire the dubbing rights to Vikram's previous Tamil films and release them in Telugu.

In Kerala, the film ran for more than 150 days and grossed over ₹6 crore; it became the highest grossing Tamil film in Kerala at that time. In Karnataka, too, the film was a success although the exact box-office figures are not known. However, the film's Hindi version Aparichit opened to poor reception, earning only ₹2.1 crore across 150 screens and was declared a flop by Box Office India. While acknowledging that the film underperformed at the box-office, Vikram stated that it nevertheless made an impact. He further added that the film got him recognition from people in the remote corners of India as the drama and the action sequences greatly appealed to them. By the end of its theatrical run, the film had grossed ₹57 crore in its lifetime.

== Legacy ==
In an August 2005 seminar titled "Revisiting psychiatric disorders in Tamil films", where the discussion revolved around the films Chandramukhi and Anniyan, psychiatrist Asokan found many logical faults in both films. While acknowledging that Anniyan was a technically better film, he stated that it did not explain some of the medical theories. In another August 2005 seminar conducted to mark the anniversary of the Quit India Movement, where participants were urged to actively fight corruption, the convener T. Hema Kumari referred to the films Bhaarateeyudu (the Telugu dubbed version of Indian) and Aparichitudu. She noted that while such films which depict a fight against corruption were appreciated, people were reluctant to join movements against such issues.

== Remake plans ==
In April 2021, it was announced that Shankar would direct a Hindi remake with Ranveer Singh reprising Vikram's role. However, in August 2021, it was reported that the remake had been stalled due to differences with producer V. Ravichandran. Ravichandran alleged that the film was getting a remake without his consent and that he had challenged that.

== Impact ==
During the 20th Vijayawada Book Festival held at Vijayawada in January 2009, Garuda Puranam, one of the 18 puranas of Hinduism, was a best-seller. Writing for The Hindu, G.V. Ramana Rao said that the book was made popular following several mentions in the film and sold like "hot cakes". Following the stupendous success of Aparichitudu in Andhra Pradesh, the State Transport Corporation of Warangal named a bus Remo, after the character played by Vikram in the film. When stand-up comedian and television anchor Bosskey launched a quirky play titled Dada (Don) in October 2005, he named the cast after famous characters in Tamil films. Accordingly, Anniyan (one of Vikram's characters in the film), Badshah (Rajinikanth in Baashha) and Velu Nayakkar (Kamal Haasan's role in Nayakan) play the central characters of a family of brothers. Similarly, in the 2013 comedy film Onbadhule Guru, in which the characters were named after popular protagonists of Tamil cinema with Yogi Babu's character was christened as Anniyan.

The characters played by Vikram were spoofed by Vadivelu in the Tamil film Aaru (2005); the comedy sequence also features four songs from the film's soundtrack album. Aparichitudu, the film's Telugu version, was parodied by comedian Venu Madhav in the Telugu films Chatrapati (2005) and Seenugadu Chiranjeevi Fan (2005). It was also parodied, along with Chandramukhi, in the film Rajababu (2006). Vikram's character of Anniyan was parodied in the Kannada film 7 O' Clock (2006). The song "Kadhal Yaanai" was recreated in the Malaysian film Ops Kossa Dappa 2 (2006). In the 2010 film Tamizh Padam, a full-length parody on stereotypical characters and clichéd sequences in Tamil cinema, the lead actor Shiva recreates the "Anthakoopam" punishment sequence to comic effect, where he tries to force a herd of buffaloes into stampeding a villain but fails in his attempt. Later, the comedy sequence was re-enacted by Allari Naresh in Sudigadu (2012), an official remake of Tamizh Padam. In the 2012 Kannada film Yaare Koogadali, a remake of the Tamil film Poraali (2011), the long and unkempt hair sported by Puneeth Rajkumar was reportedly inspired by the look of Anniyan. The character Remo inspired Sivakarthikeyan's film to have a title of the same name. Actor TSK mimics Vikram's split personality in the film Petromax (2019).

== See also ==
- List of mental disorders in film
- Dissociative identity disorder
- Corruption in India

== Bibliography ==
- Rangan, Baradwaj (2014). "Directors: Shankar". Dispatches from the Wall Corner : A Journey through Indian Cinema. Tranquebar Press, Westland Ltd. ISBN 9789384030568.
