= St. Mary's Higher Secondary School, Thiruvananthapuram =

Primary and Secondary school in Thiruvananthapuram, Kerala

Coordinates: 8°31′32.98″N 76°56′13.11″E

St. Mary's Higher Secondary School
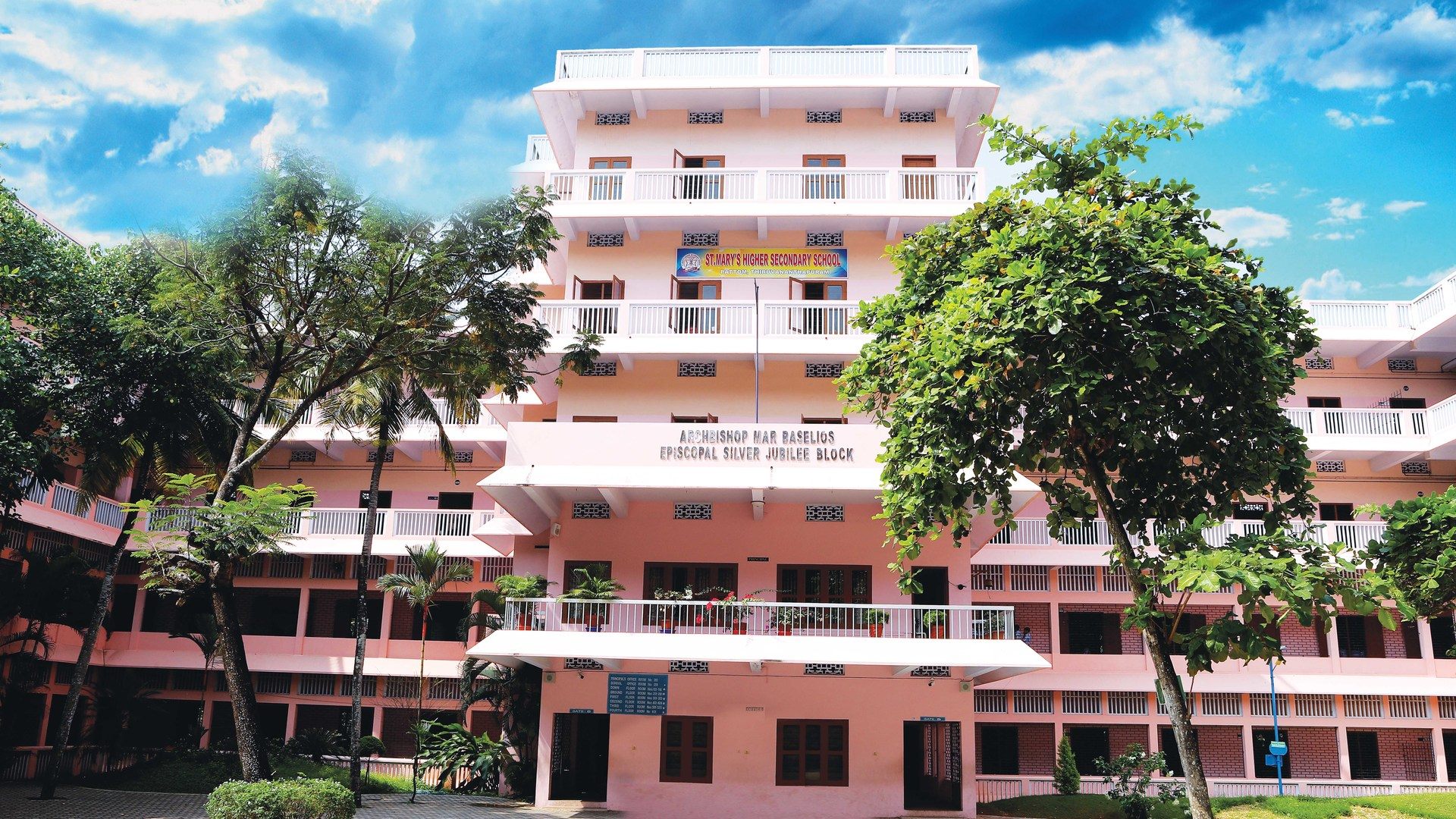
- St. Mary's Higher Secondary School, Pattom

Location
- Pattom; Thiruvananthapuram, Kerala, 695004; India

Information
- Type: Private aided
- Motto: Sedes Sapientiae – (Seat of Wisdom)
- Established: 1940
- Founder: Archbishop Geevarghese Mar Ivanios
- School board: Kerala State Education Board
- Authority: Malankara Syrian Catholic Major Archiepiscopal Church
- Principal: Rev. Fr. Nelson P
- Headmaster: Reji Lukose
- Staff: 500+
- Teaching staff: 400+
- Grades: Pre-KG, LKG, UKG, 5 to 12
- Gender: Co-educational
- Enrollment: 14,000+
- Campus type: Urban
- Houses: 🟥 Red 🟩 Green 🟨 Yellow 🟦 Blue
- Website: stmaryshsspattom.com

St. Mary's Higher Secondary School is a primary and secondary school in Thiruvananthapuram, India. It is founded in 1940 by Archbishop Geevarghese Mar Ivanios. It is considered one of the largest schools in Asia, with the total number of students exceeding 14,000.

The school has a museum and art gallery containing student artwork, cultural artifacts, and historical exhibits. These spaces are open during school functions and commemorative events.

== Facilities ==
The school has various labs, including a Physics Lab, Chemistry Lab, and Biology Lab.

== Student Organizations ==
St. Mary's Higher Secondary School, Pattom, hosts several student organizations.

=== National Cadet Corps (NCC) ===
The school has an National Cadet Corps (India) unit, which conducts training in military drills, physical fitness, civic awareness, and anti-drug campaigns.

=== Bharat Scouts and Guides ===
The school has an active Bharat Scouts and Guides unit.

== Smart Class rooms ==
As part of its goal to become a high-tech institution, St. Mary's Higher Secondary School, Pattom, converted all classrooms in its higher secondary section into smart classrooms. By September 2018, all classrooms were equipped with LCD projectors, laptops, and whiteboards, with the laptops and projectors supplied by Kerala Infrastructure and Technology for Education (KITE). The school's principal indicated that all classrooms were targeted for conversion by the 2019 academic year. Additionally, the school's IT facilities include an IT lab in the higher secondary section with 60 computers, and five other labs in the high school and UP sections housing 100 computers.

== Notable alumni ==
- Raiphi Gomez (cricketer)
- Manikuttan, Actor
