= Filmfare Award for Best Action Director – South =

Indian film award

The Filmfare Award for Best Action Director is given by the Filmfare magazine as part of its annual Filmfare Awards for South Indian films.

The award was first given in 2005.

Year	Action Director	Film	Language
2005	Peter Hein	Anniyan	Tamil

== See also ==
- Filmfare Awards South
