= Four Friends (2010 film) =

2010 film by Saji Surendran

- Theatrical release poster
- Directed by: Saji Surendran
- Written by: Krishna Poojapura
- Produced by: Tomichan Mulakupadam
- Starring: Jayaram; Kunchacko Boban; Jayasurya; Meera Jasmine
- Cinematography: Anil Nair
- Edited by: Manoj
- Music by: M. Jayachandran
- Production company: Mulakuppadam Films
- Distributed by: Mulakuppadam Release
- Release date: 28 October 2010
- Country: India
- Language: Malayalam
- Budget: ₹5.75 crore

4 Friends is a 2010 Indian Malayalam-language buddy comedy drama film directed by Saji Surendran. It stars Jayaram, Kunchacko Boban, Jayasurya, and Meera Jasmine in the lead roles with Kamal Haasan appearing in a cameo as himself.

The film was released on 28 October 2010. It was dubbed into Tamil as Anbulla Kamal.

== Plot ==
Roy, Surya, Amir, and Gauri come from entirely different backgrounds. One thing they have in common is cancer. Roy is a multi-millionaire; Amir is a small-time goonda and a die-hard fan of Kamal Haasan; Soorya is an MBA student; and Gouri is an MBBS student. Each of them is dying from the disease (blood, liver, bone, and lung cancer, respectively), and they all come for treatment at a plush hospital, Pratheeksha, run by Dr. Nandakumar. Though they take some time to become friends, they eventually grow close. They decide to go to Malaysia to meet Surya's girlfriend Vineetha because they want a positive outlook on their lives. This forms the rest of the story.

== Cast ==
- Jayaram as Roy Mathew, a rich businessman and the MD of RM Groups, a multinational company
- Kunchacko Boban as Surya, an MBA student
- Jayasurya as Amir, a Kamal Haasan fan who earns a living by selling black tickets in theatres and gang works
- Meera Jasmine as Gauripriya, a brilliant fourth-semester MBBS student
- Lalu Alex as Haridas, Surya's father
- Suraj Venjaramoodu as Ringgit Sasi
- Salim Kumar as Kochaousepp, a staff in Pratheeksha
- Siddique as Dr. Siddharth
- K. B. Ganesh Kumar as Dr. Nandagopal
- Sukumari as Amir'a grandmother
- Manikuttan as Vishnu, Gouri's brother (voiceover by Jis Joy)
- Prem Prakash as Murali, Gouri's father
- Sarayu as Vineetha
- Seema as Lathika, Surya's mother
- Srinda as Ayisha, Amir's sister
- Kamal Haasan as himself at the airport (cameo appearance)

== Production ==
The film was shot at locations in Kerala and Malaysia. It was produced by Tomichan Mulakuppadam under the company Mulakuppadam Films on a budget of ₹5.75 crore.

== Soundtrack ==
The soundtrack was composed by M. Jayachandran, with lyrics penned by Kaithapram. It features three original compositions and a remix version of the 1975 song "Yeh Dosti" from the Hindi film Sholay.

Track listing
No.	Title	Lyrics	Singer(s)	Length
1.	"Oru Naal Annorunaal"	Kaithapram	Karthik, Swetha
2.	"Ente Chithira"	Kaithapram	K. J. Yesudas, Vijay Yesudas, Akhila Anand
3.	"Yeh Dosti"	Arjith Singh	Shankar Mahadevan, Udit Narayan
4.	"Parayamo Rappadi"	Kaithapram	P. Jayachandran

== Reception ==
Paresh C. Palicha of Rediff.com rated the film 1.5/5 and wrote, "The basic thread of the film is taken from the Hollywood film The Bucket List [...] But the comparison ends there. Four Friends is melodramatic and far from reality". Sify wrote, "The film is a mushy tearjerker and would have been fine some 15 years back, but it is outdated for today’s audiences. With a disturbingly predictable style and stereotyped characters, the film makes you cringe after a while".
