= Sám Hối: The Living Sandbag =

- Vietnamese theatrical release poster
- Vietnamese: Sám hối
- Directed by: Peter Hein
- Produced by: Ramani Raja
- Starring: Bình Minh; Anh Thư; Angelina Raja
- Cinematography: Balakrishna Thota
- Edited by: Manikandan Sivakumar
- Music by: Sam C. S.
- Production company: Ánh Sao Production
- Distributed by: VSABV Films (United States)
- Release dates: 12 January 2021 (Ho Chi Minh City); 15 January 2021 (Vietnam)
- Running time: 99 minutes
- Countries: India; Vietnam
- Language: Vietnamese
- Budget: ₫50 billion
- Box office: ₫1.3 billion (>US$56,800)

Sám Hối: The Living Sandbag (Vietnamese: Sám hối, lit. 'Repentance') is a 2021 Indo-Vietnamese film that marks the directorial debut of Indian stunt master Peter Hein. The film is about a former boxing champion who re-enters the ring to save his family and confront his past.

== Plot ==
Hoàng Minh Long is a retired boxer who has retired at the peak of his career after a string of victories and now leads a happy life with his wife Thủy and their daughter Diệu. However, his arrogance earns the ire of powerful boxing manager Cường. When Diệu is found to have a terminal illness, Minh Long gets back into the ring in order to get the funds needed for her treatment but has to face his stubbornness and Cường, who is stopping him from coming back.

== Cast ==
- Bình Minh as Hoàng Minh Long
- Anh Thư as Thủy
- Angelina Raja as Diệu

== Production ==
Filming was first announced in 2017 in Ho Chi Minh City, with later shoots in Long An, Bình Dương and Vũng Tàu. Some filming was also done in India. Post-production also took place in India over two years. The project drew staff from both India and Vietnam, with Indian stunt master of Vietnamese heritage Peter Hein as the director, his first time in the role. Indian music director Sam C. S. was taken on as the film's composer; he worked with the Philharmonic Orchestra of North Macedonia to make the music but had to direct them remotely due to the effects of the COVID-19 pandemic.

== Release and reception ==
The film was first shown in Ho Chi Minh City on 12 January 2021, with the Indian consul-general and members of the Indian Business Chamber in Vietnam in attendance, before being released nationwide in Vietnam on 15 January. It was to be released in India and the United States at the same time, but the pandemic disrupted those plans. It was later released in selected AMC theatres in the United States, premiering in California on 24 March 2022. Most of the cast traveled to the U.S. to attend a premiere event, which also featured Westminster councilmember Charlie Nguyen Chi (Nguyễn Mạnh Chí). Further releases are planned in Australia, Canada, Europe and India.

The film flopped at the box office in Vietnam, only earning ₫1.3 billion despite having a budget of ₫50 billion. Audiences reportedly found the fight sequences overly dramatic and found it packed with "too many characters", making it "dense and difficult to follow". However, the performance of Angelina Raja, daughter of producer Ramani Raja, as Diệu was praised.
