= Pulimurugan =

- Theatrical release poster
- Directed by: Vysakh
- Written by: Udayakrishna
- Produced by: Tomichan Mulakuppadam
- Starring: Mohanlal; Jagapathi Babu; Kamalini Mukherjee
- Cinematography: Shaji Kumar
- Edited by: Johnkutty
- Music by: Gopi Sundar
- Production company: Mulakuppadam Films
- Distributed by: Mulakupadam Release
- Release date: 7 October 2016 (India)
- Running time: 159 minutes
- Country: India
- Language: Malayalam
- Budget: ₹25 crore
- Box office: est. ₹139–145 crore (Note: Pulimurugan's reported worldwide grosses vary between ₹139 crore (The Indian Express) – ₹145 crore (NDTV))

Pulimurugan is a 2016 Indian Malayalam-language action thriller film directed by Vysakh and produced by Tomichan Mulakuppadam through Mulakuppadam Films. The screenplay was written by Udayakrishna —half of the duo Udayakrishna and Sibi K. Thomas —in his first independent screenplay. The film stars Mohanlal in the titular role, along with a huge ensemble cast including Jagapati Babu, Kamalinee Mukherjee, Lal, Vinu Mohan, Kishore, Bala, Noby Marcose, Siddique, Suraj Venjaramoodu, Nandu, M. R. Gopakumar, Sudheer Karamana, Hareesh Peradi, Makarand Deshpande and Namitha. The film centers on Murugan, a skilled protector of Villagers of Puliyoor facing the threat of deadly tiger attacks. He meet Daddy Girija, an illegal drug dealer who take advantage of his innocence.

Principal photography commenced on 16 July 2015 in Hanoi, Vietnam, and was completed in early February 2016. The film score and soundtrack were composed by Gopi Sundar, while cinematography and editing was handled by Shaji Kumar and Johnkutty respectively. The film was released on 7 October 2016. Despite receiving mixed reviews from critics, the film was an industry hit at the box office. Pulimurugan became the first Malayalam film to earn ₹100 crore, setting several records at the box office and emerged as the highest grossing Malayalam film till date and held the record for seven years until it was surpassed by 2018. The 3D version of the film was released in April 2017, and that version released in theatres on July, 2017. The film has recorded theater footfalls of around 7.5 million during its run in Kerala alone. It remains as one of the highest-grossing Malayalam films of all time.

Two songs from the film—"Kaadanayum Kaalchilambe" and "Maanathe Maarikurumbe" were selected among the 70 eligible songs contending for the Academy Award for Best Original Song nomination in the 90th Academy Awards. The film score was also selected among the 141 eligible scores contending for the Academy Award for Best Original Score nomination.

== Plot ==
Murugan lives in Puliyoor, a small forest village that is vulnerable to man-eating Royal Bengal Tigers and frequent human–wildlife conflicts. When he was young, Murugan's mother died after his brother Manikuttan was born. Soon after, his father was killed by a tiger; in vengeance, Murugan traps and kills the tiger with the help of his uncle Balaraman. Years later, Murugan is a truck driver, who lives with his wife Myna, and has a daughter, Chakki. He hunts and kills rogue tigers whenever they invade the village. Acknowledging his skills in hunting tigers, the villagers call him Pulimurugan (tiger Murugan). Murugan is grateful to the villagers who cared for him after his parents's deaths, and is obsessively protective of Manikuttan, who is about to finish his MBA graduation in Mangalore.

One day, Kadutha, the village chief, meets a hooded stranger who asks the whereabouts of Murugan for a hunting assignment. Murugan has been away from Puliyoor for days and many people have been killed by the tigers. According to Kadutha, Manikuttan's friends Benny and Shiva had arrived at Puliyoor, sent by Manikuttan to see Balaraman. Shiva's father Daddy Girija owned a pharmaceutical company which was developing a drug to treat cancer and they need ganja (cannabis) from the forest. When the medical research succeeds, Manikuttan will be offered a job in the company, so Balaraman helps them. They made a contract with Ramaiya, an illegal ganja dealer in the forest; on their return to the village they encounter a tiger but were saved by Murugan, who kills it.

Meanwhile, Manikuttan returned home after his final examinations. The forest officials have found the dead tiger's carcass at Thookupara; its killing is a violation of the Indian Wildlife Protection Act, a non-bailable offence. Forest ranger R. K. was assigned to investigate; R.K. has a four-year-old grudge against Murugan, when he had once tried to molest Myna, only to be threatened by Murugan. Taking advantage on the present scenario, R.K. prepared to file a self-witness F. I. R. against Murugan, who was forced to hide. Meanwhile, DSP Iyep Zachariah arrived at Puliyoor, apparently for Murugan. The ganja was loaded into Murugan's lorry for transporting to Mangalore.

Shiva and Benny hear that a confidant of Ramaiya was in police custody. Seeing a possibility of leaking the information, they are forced to transport it overnight. Shiva offered Murugan sanctuary in Kasaragod under Daddy's protection and deceived him that the police are in pursuit to arrest him for the tiger killing. A team led by Zachariya arrived at Murugan's home. Murugan with his family escaped to Mangalore in the transport and managed to escape the cops. He delivered the ganja and Manikuttan's job had been approved. Murugan impressed Daddy and earned his trust by helping in his business activities. Meanwhile, more people are killed by tigers at Puliyoor. In an encounter with Zachariya, Murugan learnt that Daddy was illegally producing hash oil and exporting it under cover of the pharmacy where Manikuttan was working.

Manikuttan co-operated with the cops to capture Daddy. Shiva caught Manikuttan extracting evidence of their activities and tortured him. Murugan rescued Manikuttan; in the ensuing fight, Shiva was accidentally killed by Murugan. The cops ambushed Daddy but he escaped. After narrating the events, the hooded stranger is revealed to be Daddy, who is seeking revenge for Shiva's death. Daddy assembles a group of assassins and ambushes Balaraman and Poongayi Sasi, where they take Balaraman and send Sasi back with severe injuries. Murugan returns home and learns about the events, where he heads to kill Daddy. A fight with the assassins ensues where Murugan kills them all, but gets attacked by Daddy. A fight ensues where Murugan saves Balaram from the tiger's den and defeats Daddy. Daddy gets killed and eaten by the tiger, when Murugan rescues Balaram and gets out of that den.

== Cast ==
- Mohanlal as Murugan
  - Master Ajas as Young Murugan
- Jagapati Babu as Daddy Girija
- Kamalini Mukherjee as Myna, Murugan's wife
- Lal as Balaraman, Murugan's uncle
  - Romin Antony as Young Balaraman
- Vinu Mohan as Manikuttan, Murugan's brother
- Bala as Shiva, Manikuttan's friend
- Noby Marcose as Benny, Manikuttan's friend
- Suraj Venjaramoodu as Poongayi Sasi
- Siddique as ACP Iype Zachariah
- Kishore as R. Krishna "R. K" Kumar, forest ranger
- Namitha as Julie
- Nandu as Divakaran, forest guard
- Hareesh Peradi as Mesthiri, Girija's right-hand man
- Makarand Deshpande as Ramayya, Dacoit and marijuana dealer
- M. R. Gopakumar as Kadutha, tribal head and Vaidyar
- Sethu Lakshmi as Bhavani Thalla, Balaraman's mother-in-law
- Baby Durga Premjith as Chakki, Murugan's daughter
- Sudheer Karamana as Cherkalakkaran "Kayikka" Khader
- Sasi Kalinga as Balan Chettan, tea shopkeeper
- Idavela Babu as Shintappan, Julie's husband
- Chembil Ashokan as Thankachan
- Jayakrishnan as Raghuchandran
- V. K. Baiju as Forest Ranger
- Anjana Appukuttan as Servant
- Kannan Pattambi as Basheer
- Vinod Kedamangalam as Shintappan's driver
- Santhosh Keezhattoor as Murugan's father (cameo)
- Antony Perumbavoor as Jeep driver (cameo)
- Anjali Nair as Murugan's mother (cameo)

== Production ==
=== Development ===
A week after the release of Vysakh's directorial debut film Pokkiri Raja in 2010, its producer Tomichan Mulakuppadam talked with Vysakh for a future collaboration with Mohanlal in the lead role, who had already agreed to do a film with Vysakh before he debuted with Pokkiri Raja. The project was green-lit, but did not progress into a planning stage. Pokkiri Raja co-writer Udaykrishna was hired as a writer. Despite further discussions regarding the project, no progress occurred until 2014.

Pulimurugan was conceived by Udayakrishna, who developed the story idea from stories he heard during his childhood in eastern Ernakulam District. The stories presented the lives of people in Pooyamkutty, a small forest-area village where the villagers often had to fight with wild animals for living. At the time, Udayakrishna hinted about the character to Mohanlal, who showed interest. It is the first independent work by Udayakrishna after his split from the duo Udayakrishna and Siby K. Thomas.

The initial development of the project began in late December 2014, few days after the release of Vysakh's Cousins. Udayakrishna told Vysakh the plot about a jungle village which is frequently attacked by wild animals and a hunter who takes revenge on the animal. Vysakh decided it would be his next film. Together they developed the story; they were aware of the large funding required to realise the film. When they told the story to Mulakupadam, Vysakh asked him to wait a month. In meantime, Vysakh and Udayakrishna started researching for the film to get an understanding about the subject. A month later, they met Mulakuppadam, saying the film could not be started with a fixed budget, filming schedule or a release date, to which Mulakuppadam agreed. They next met Mohanlal, who already knew the plot idea from Udayakrishna. They told him the opening 15 minutes in much detail; he was impressed but was skeptical about the feasibility of it. Vysakh was also skeptical about shooting some of the sequences. Mohanlal was also asked to give no deadlines in terms of his dates, schedule or release; Mohanlal said he is ready to do it anytime they wanted.

To write a detailed screenplay, Vysakh and Udayakrishna stayed in a small house in Kerala for around three months. They travelled to get ideas about picturing the written scenes and prepared storyboards for the screenplay. They could not find any references for the man-animal fight scenes, so they consulted graphic experts to visualise the scenes. Mohanlal suggested engaging Thai fight-master Kecha, who is familiar with choreographing stunts with animals, to choreograph the film's stunts. Kecha asked for four years' time, which they could not afford, so they signed Peter Hein. Hein, who had not done man-animal fights before, took his preparation time for the film. The makers travelled to locations in South Africa and Vietnam to study tigers, their behaviour and how to tame them for filming. A one-week fight-training camp was conducted for Mohanlal in Vietnam, but the camp was dismissed after the first day after Hein was impressed with Mohanlal's action skills.

=== Casting ===
In August 2015, Malayalam actress Anusree was offered the role of Myna. Due to a problem with a vein in her left shoulder she had to undergo a surgery which made her to opt out of the film. Later Bengali actress Kamalini Mukherjee replaced her as the female lead opposite Mohanlal in her first association with Mohanlal. Mukherjee had worked with Vysakh in a guest appearance in Cousins (2014). According to Mukherjee, her role is quite rustic and is not the type of role she has previously portrayed, and "the character has no urban nuances or traits". Lal officially confirmed his role in an interview in early September 2015, which he said he would play alongside Mohanlal. In the same month, Kishore revealed his role as a forest officer. Kishore, who was changing from negative to positive roles at the time, said he took the role because it was a Mohanlal film. Some pictures of South Indian actress Namitha taken in the filming location surfaced on the internet on 13 September, confirming her presence. She plays Julie, a girl from an affluent family.

Telugu actor Jagapati Babu reportedly joined the film on 14 September. In an interview the same month, Bala confirmed his involvement with the film. Bala was reported to have opted out from director Siva's Tamil film Vedalam (2015) in favour of a prominent role in Pulimurugan. Suraj Venjaramoodu confirmed his part the following month.

Vinu Mohan starred as Manikuttan, the younger brother of Murugan. The film shows a deep bond between the siblings. The presence of Makarand Deshpande was revealed when the official poster was released on 15 April 2016. Deshpande plays a wood smuggler; he described his role as a "quintessential bad guy who works for someone. I walk around in getups that can have a camouflage effect in the forest, so that I am not spotted easily." Murugan's childhood role was played by Master Ajas, who was selected after Vysakh saw his performance as a contestant in the Indian dance reality show D 4 Dance. Ajas was suggested to Vysakh by Nobi, who also plays a supporting role. Ajas made his acting debut in the film; before filming began he was given special training by the stunt team for fighting and running.

Anjali Aneesh plays Murugan's pregnant mother. Sudheer Karamana was signed for the role of a Muslim character named Kayikka, who appears in a single scene. Other supporting roles are played by Siddique, Nandu, Santhosh Keezhattoor, Sasi Kalinga, Sethulakshmi, Chali Pala, Hareesh Peradi, V. K. Baiju, Kannan Pattambi and Jaykrishnan.

The film's costume designer was Arun Manohar. The design of Mohanlal's Pulimurugan outfit was based on the sketches drawn by poster designer-cum-storyboard illustrator Subin Sudhakaran. All crew members committed to the film with a 30 percent reduced remuneration for the sake of reducing its cost overrun. The film's art director was Joseph Nellickal, Johnkutty was the editor, the production controller was Noble Jacob and Satheesh Kavilkotta was the executive producer. Binu Manambur and Nadeem Irani were the production managers.

=== Filming ===
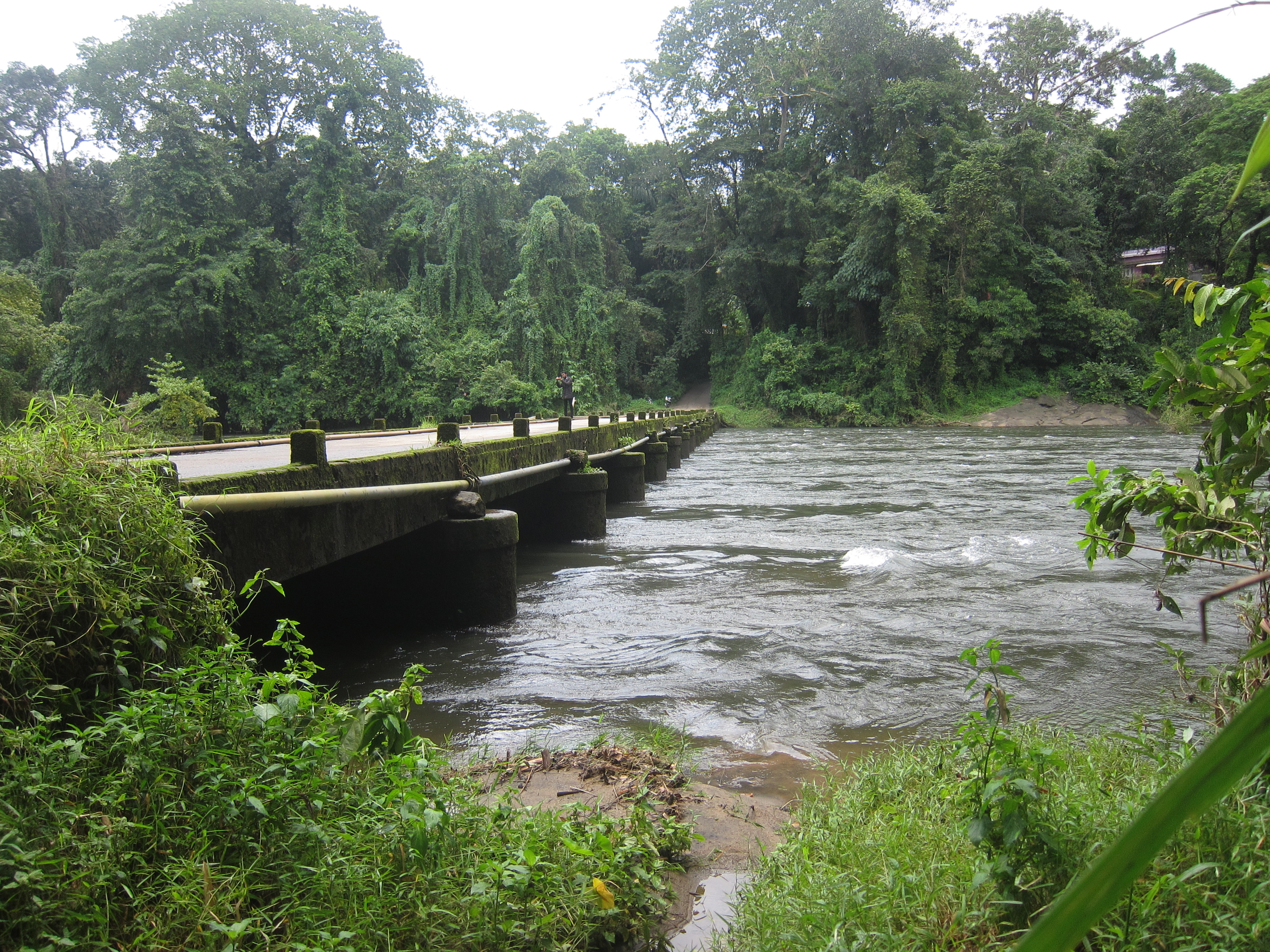
The film was shot in Pooyamkutty

The film was reportedly due to start production in September 2014. In June that year, Vysakh said the film would be made after the release of Cousins in December 2014. In April 2015, Udayakrishnan announced plans to start filming in June and July, with the first schedule starting in Vietnam and the remaining portions being filmed in Kerala. Principal photography and a pooja ceremony for the film was held in Hanoi on 16 July 2015. Filming began in Kochi, Kerala, on 24 July 2015. Mukherjee joined in this schedule. The next schedule was planned to start in a forested area of Pooyamkutty in Kothamangalam, Eranakulam district, in early August 2015. Pindimedu waterfall near Pooyamkutty was a central location, serving as the place where Murugan lives.

The fictional village Puliyoor was created on a set in Pooyamkutty that included a wooden bridge and Murugan's hut. Filming took place for 90 days in the protected forest area in Pooyamkutty. The production team left the set of the hut intact after filming there ended. The hut was created on a rock beside the Pooyamkutty River. Ninety percent of the film was shot in the forest. Much of the film was shot in and around Pooyamkutty, including forested areas of Mamalakandam, Tholnada, Kurunnumedu, and Knacherry. A tea shop was created on a set in Blavana near Pooyamkutty town and a scene in which Murugan reveals his love to Myna was shot at Kalladi Pocket. The tribal colony where the village chief Kadutha lives was filmed at the tribal settlement in Panthapra, Mamalakandam. Some portions were shot deep in the forest near Pooyamkutty; the cast and crew had to travel for 90 minutes and then trek for another 30 minutes to reach the location. No rehearsals were conducted for any scenes, except for the action sequences.

While in Pooyamkutty city, a scuffle between the crew and the local natives happened on the night of 10 September 2015. Apparently the driver of the lorry "Mayil Vahanam" (used as the ride of Murugan in the film) started the trouble. Fistfights ensued between local people and the crew members, and a native youth was hospitalized with severe injuries. In late September 2015, there were reports that filming in the forest areas of Pooyamkutty was halted upon a stay order issued by Kerala High Court after a petition alleging the materials used for creating film sets was damaging the ecosystem and the team were planning to execute bomb explosion scenes. The Divisional Forest Officer (DFO) of the area said the court directed him to watch the location to ensure the filming progressed without causing any damage, but the news about filming being halted was false. Filming also took place in Perumbavoor, Ernakulam district, in September 2015.

The scene involving Pulimurugan's encounter with Kayikka and the fight sequence was shot in 10 days in October 2015. After taking a short break in the beginning of November 2015, Mohanlal returned to the sets in Ernakulam on 10 November. On 20 November 2015, The Times of India reported that Mohanlal still had 19 more days left for filming; he already spent almost three months for the film with sporadic breaks. In that month, Vysakh narrowly avoided an accident in the shooting location outside a warehouse near Kothamangalam. Hein was performing high-speed stunts with a car to be used in the film, Vysakh jumped away before Hein took a swerving reverse towards him. A large part of the action sequences were shot in November 2015. For some stunt scenes it was decided to use stunt doubles, but Mohanlal preferred to do it by himself and, motivated by this, Mukherjee also avoided using a stunt double for a scene. Hein said about his experience directing Mohanlal; "Normally in films we see heroes standing aside and [stunt doubles] doing the stunt scenes. Here it is just the opposite; I am lucky."

Because filming with wild animals is not allowed in India, the crew travelled abroad to film the scenes involving a tiger. The tiger scenes were filmed during January 2016 at locations in Bangkok, Thailand. The tiger was trained by Bangkok-based trainers under the supervision of Hein. The initial plan was to use graphics but the team later decided to use a real tiger. They first went to South Africa to shoot the tiger scenes but the results were not suitable. After trying to find locations in Vietnam, the tiger scenes were eventually filmed in one month in Thailand. The original plan was to use a leopard, but leopards run too quickly and a man running with it would look unrealistic. The decision to use tigers was also taken because tigers are the only big cats that can be tamed and trained conveniently. Changes were made to the script accordingly. To direct the man-tiger fight sequences, Hein researched tigers for months and declined films that could have earned him crores. Mohanlal said Hein "showed me how they breathe". The tigers for filming were provided by the Tiger Temple in Kanchanaburi, Thailand. Four tigers were used in the film; the crew camped for 10 days to familiarise themselves with the tigers before filming.

According to Vysakh, while filming with tigers, the schedule was decided by the tigers and depending on their mood to perform. The tigers usually participated for an hour or two, mostly in the early morning or late evening. The maximum delay in production was caused by the decision to use a live tiger, which consumed the most days that account 10 percent of the total film. It took an overall 35 days to film the tiger episodes. Although graphics were also used, over 80 percent of the tiger scenes were filmed with a real tiger. The last 22 minutes of the film, the climax, was shot in 56 days. The tiger den shown in the climax was created in a studio set. Mohanlal joined for his remaining schedule in the third week of January 2016 for a two-week-long filming schedule. It was reported that on 27 January, Mohanlal's car was hit by a speeding tipper lorry at Illithode, Malayattoor, on his way to the location and he escaped unhurt. Later, his driver clarified that it was not Mohanlal's car but a crew vehicle. The final schedule continued until early February 2016, for re-shooting some sequences in the location in Ernakulam. Mohanlal, who gave 90-day dates for the filming, filmed for 115 days. The whole filming schedule was completed in 220 days. The film was initially planned with a 100 days schedule, with 60 days for Vysakh and 40 days for Hein for stunt choreography but Vysakh took 100 days and Hein took 120 days.

=== Post-production ===
Hyderabad-based Firefly Creative Studio handled the visual effects for the film. The studio was suggested to the production team by Hein, who had earlier worked with them in Baahubali: The Beginning (2015). There were only a few members from the VFX team present during film's pre-production work. The visual effects supervisor was Murali Manohar. Enough time was allowed for the VFX work. Four crore of the film's budget was spent on the visual effects. It took 200 days to complete post-production.

== Themes ==
In August 2015, Mohanlal said in an interview with Amrita TV, Pulimurugan has an animal as the antagonist and the story goes through the emotions of the human and the animal. The film's tagline is "The Wild Hunter", which was revealed in the release of its first-look poster on 6 August 2015. According to website Onmanorama, the poster featuring Mohanlal illustrated his character as a hunter, looking "intense like a predator whose sight set on the prey and is getting ready to launch himself on it, right hand clutching the ground and right leg firmly dug into the soil gathering force, left hand spread like a wing to maintain the balance and left leg placed strategically to give additional thrust for the attack."

The story happens in a village called Puliyoor. Mohanlal plays Pulimurugan, a man who helps the villagers. According to Vysakh, unlike his earlier film, which he describes as "complete entertainers with a lot of colour and action", the colour palette used in Pulimurugan is "subdued and realistic". Because the story takes place in a forest village, an earthy colour tone was used in the film with mainly greens, browns and subtle yellows to keep it realistic.

== Release ==
Pulimurugan was initially planned for release at Christmas in December 2015; because filming was continuing the release was postponed until the Hindu festival of Vishu in April 2016.

The film was released in the United Arab Emirates and Gulf Cooperation Council on 3 November 2016. It was shown in 350 screens in 82 theatres, with 630 shows on the opening day; the largest-ever release for an Indian film, surpassing the records of Kabali (425 shows) and Sultan (225 shows). It was released in 140 screens in the United Kingdom on 4 November. The film was dubbed into Telugu-language as Manyam Puli and was released on 2 December 2016 in 500 screens across Andhra Pradesh and Telangana, and was distributed by Saraswathi Films.

The film was also dubbed in Tamil with the same title and was released on 19 May 2017 in 300 centers all over Tamil Nadu. The Tamil version was too a commercial success and also opened to a good response. RP Bala wrote the dialogues for the Tamil version.

== Reception ==
=== Box office ===
On its opening day, Pulimurugan earned ₹4.05 crore in Kerala, making it the highest opening-day gross for a Malayalam film and the second-highest of any film (behind Tamil-language film Kabali) in the state. Pulimurugan grossed ₹4.83 crore on Sunday 9 October, taking its 3-day gross to ₹12.91 crore and setting the record for the highest-opening-weekend at the state box office. In 5 days, Pulimurugan's earnings in Kerala exceeded ₹20 crore; the fastest time for any film. In 8 days' theatrical run, the film is estimated to have grossed about ₹30 crore in the state.

Pulimurugan set a new Malayalam-film record by completing 10,000 full-house shows in 14 days. The film earned ₹60 crore in 17 days of its theatrical run in India. In a month of its release, Pulimurugan became the first Malayalam film to gross 100 crore at the box office. Until 23 November 2016, the film grossed ₹125 crore worldwide. Manyam Puli after completing 50 days run collected ₹12 crore from Andhra Pradesh and Telangana box office. Pulimurugan 's worldwide gross collection was estimated to be ₹139–145 crore.

Overseas, Pulimurugan created a record for the highest-opening-weekend gross for an Indian film in the UAE, grossing ₹13.83 crore in the first weekend (3-6 November) and exceeding the earnings of Kabali, Sultan, and Baahubali: The Beginning. The film collected over ₹35 crore from the UAE box office when it had run for 50 days. The film ran for 98 days in the UAE and became the third-longest-running film there, behind Drishyam (125 days) and Titanic (110 days). It collected ₹37.09 crore from the UAE box office.

=== Critical response ===
Upon release, Pulimurugan mainly received mixed reviews from critics. While the film's cast performances, action sequences, tiger scenes and music received praise, the script and pacing of the film received criticism.

Awarding the film 3.5 on a scale of 5, Nelson K. Paul from Malayala Manorama wrote; "The narrative is straight and tight. Most importantly, the movie is engaging throughout and doesn't slip off. Though it's an action thriller primarily. Vysakh has all the ingredients laced in for a well-balanced mix. The director has made sure that the elements he put in are there for a reason". He praised Mohanlal's "super flexible in stunt scenes" and his "mighty impressive" efforts, Kumar's cinematography and Hein's "adrenaline-filled action" choreography, with a special mention for the climax fight. He also commended the characterisation of Myna and the onscreen chemistry of Mohanlal and Mukherjee.

In his review for The Indian Express, Manoj Kumar R. rated Pulimurugan 3.5 stars out of 5. He praised Mohanlal's acting and the "high-voltage" stunts, and called the screenplay "tight and engaging" with Sunder's film score and Kumar's cinematography adding to the film. He wrote; "It is a simple movie that basically aims to entertain the audience. The movie does not dwell too much on the man-animal conflict and discusses what is right or what is wrong". According to him, Vysakh has succeeded in exploiting the stardom of Mohanlal. The Times of India critic Sanjith Sidhardhan rated the film 3.5 on a scale of 5 and wrote that the film's strength is "a fleshed out story and pacy screenplay that takes its protagonist out of the wild and puts him in the world of ruthless men—a scenario where the hunter becomes the prey ... The movie has a good enough story to keep the audience engaged while providing ample thrills through Peter Hein-choreographed fantastic action sequences". He also praised Sunder's "rousing theme music" and the "crisp" editing that made the "161-minute runtime a breeze".

In his review for Rediff.com, Paresh C. Palicha commented; "It is Mohanlal's calibre as an actor that makes this thriller a really thrilling experience. Udaykrishna's writing and Vysakh's direction use him very well, knowing what will work with his fans". He rated the film 2.5 stars out of 5. The reviewer from Sify gave a positive review, describing it as a "winner all the way" and a "super entertainer", and said; "with breathtaking visuals, top notch performances, superb action sequences and thrilling music, Vysakh has cooked a delicious treat. Though it is a bit too long at two hours and 41 minutes, this one keeps you engaged for sure". Sify noted Hein and Kumar for the stunts and visuals, called the performances of Mohanlal "an absolute delight to watch", and praised other cast members including Lal, Babu, Venjaramoodu, Kishore, and Ajas. Sify concluded that "Pulimurugan wins with the hard work that has gone into its making. It's the kind of masala that is superbly enjoyable and then there is Mohanlal in terrific form."

Krishna B. Nair of Metromatinee wrote a positive review, calling it a "visual extravaganza plus an edge-of-the-seat experience!", and said, "Pulimurugan has a very impressive first half, not so fast paced yet thrilling second half and an absolutely stunning climax". She praised Mohanal's "dedication for the intense stunt sequences" and his combination scenes with Mukherji, who is "equally aggressive and adventurous" as Mukherji. James also praised Sundar's film score, Kumar's cinematography, the VFX work, and Hein for introducing "high-voltage ... whole new action sequences to the Malayali audiences", which "struck a chord with the moviegoers".

Anna M.M. Vetticad of Firstpost gave the film 2 stars out of five, remarking "the combined strength of Lalettan, the tigers, the suspenseful action and the humour when it is not crude is not enough to drown out the loudness and crassness of Pulimurugan. This one I guess is for the forgiving Mohanlal fan or action enthusiasts who are willing to close their eyes to a lack of refinement and sensitivity."

=== Accolades ===
Two songs from the film—"Kaadanayum Kaalchilambe" and "Maanathe Maarikurumbe" were included by the Academy of Motion Picture Arts and Sciences in the selection list of 70 songs eligible for contending for the nomination in the 90th Academy Awards for the Best Original Song category. The film score was also selected among the 141 eligible scores contending for the Academy Award for Best Original Score nomination.

Award	Date of ceremony	Category	Nominee(s)	Result	Ref.
Asianet Film Awards	20 January 2017	Best Actor	Mohanlal	Won	
Asianet Film Awards	20 January 2017	Popular Movie of the Year	Tomichan Mulakuppadam	Won	
Asianet Film Awards	20 January 2017	Best Supporting Actress	Sethulakshmi	Won	
Asianet Film Awards	20 January 2017	Best Actor in a Negative Role	Jagapati Babu	Won	
Asianet Film Awards	20 January 2017	Best Editor	Johnkutty	Won	
Asianet Film Awards	20 January 2017	Best Cinematographer	Shaji Kumar	Won	
Asianet Film Awards	20 January 2017	Best Action Master (Honour Special Jury Award)	Peter Hein	Won	
Asiavision Awards	18 November 2016	Popular Movie	Vysakh	Won	
Asiavision Awards	18 November 2016	Popular Actor of the Year	Mohanlal	Won	
Asiavision Awards	18 November 2016	Best Music Director	Gopi Sunder	Won	
Asiavision Awards	18 November 2016	Best Singer – Female	K. S. Chithra (for "Kaadaniyum Kalchilambe")	Won	
Asiavision Awards	18 November 2016	Best Cinematographer	Shaji Kumar	Won	
Filmfare Awards South	17 June 2017	Best Film – Malayalam	Pulimurugan	Nominated	
National Film Awards	3 May 2017	Special Jury Award	Mohanlal	Won	
National Film Awards	3 May 2017	Best Stunt Choreographer	Peter Hein	Won	
South Indian International Movie Awards	30 June 2017	Best Film	Mulakuppadam Films	Nominated	
South Indian International Movie Awards	30 June 2017	Best Director	Vysakh	Won	
South Indian International Movie Awards	30 June 2017	Best Actor	Mohanlal	Won	
South Indian International Movie Awards	30 June 2017	Best Actor In a Negative Role	Jagapati Babu	Nominated	
South Indian International Movie Awards	30 June 2017	Best Music Director	Gopi Sunder	Nominated	
South Indian International Movie Awards	30 June 2017	Best Playback Singer (Female)	K. S. Chithra (for "Kaadaniyum Kalchilambe")	Won	
South Indian International Movie Awards	30 June 2017	Special Jury Award	Jagapati Babu	Won	
Vanitha Film Awards	12 February 2017	Best Actor	Mohanlal	Won	
Vanitha Film Awards	12 February 2017	Most Popular Film	Vysakh, Tomichan Mulakuppadam	Won	
Vanitha Film Awards	12 February 2017	Best Female Singer	Vani Jairam (for "Maanathe Marikurumbe")	Won	

== Music ==
Pulimurugan

Soundtrack album by Gopi Sunder
- Released: 14 October 2016
- Recorded: August 2016
- Venue: Ernakulam
- Genre: Feature Film Soundtrack
- Length: 10:22
- Label: Millennium Audios
- Producer: Tomichan Mulakuppadam

Gopi Sunder chronology
Majnu (2016)	Pulimurugan (2016)	Devi (2016)

The film's soundtrack and film score were composed by Gopi Sunder. The soundtrack runs for over ten minutes and has three tracks; a duet sung by K. J. Yesudas and K. S. Chithra, a solo by Vani Jairam, and a theme song by Sunder. Rafeeq Ahammed, Murukan Kattakada, and B. K. Harinarayanan were the lyricists. The music album was released on 5 October 2016 in an event held at the Crowne Plaza hotel in Kochi. Vysakh and Udayakrishna were absent from the function; they were busy with the release.

=== Track listing ===
All music is composed by Gopi Sunder.

No.	Title	Writer(s)	Performer(s)	Length
1.	"Kaadaniyum Kalchilambe"	Rafeeq Ahammed	K. J. Yesudas, K. S. Chithra	03:57
2.	"Manathe Marikurumbe"	Murukan Kattakada	Vani Jairam	04:27
3.	"Pulimurugan Theme"	B. K. Harinarayanan	Gopi Sundar	02:38
4.	"Malayatoor malayum keri"		Mohanlal
Total length:				10:22

In late December 2015, Sunder announced that the film would have two songs and more might be added, one of which would be a lullaby sung by S. Janaki and another song sung by Jassie Gift and Shreya Ghoshal. Janaki, however, announced her retirement from singing in the second half of 2016. She was replaced with Jairam, and Gift and Ghoshal were replaced with Yesudas and Chithra. Sunder approached Yesudas with the composition of "Kaadaniyum Kalchilambe" in late August 2016—his first association with Sunder. Including his discussions with Yesudas, the recording process was completed in one-and-a-half hours. Ahammed was the lyricist. The theme song starting with the line "Muruga Muruga" was written by Harinarayanan; its lyrics were written after finishing the composition. The songs were recorded in a studio in Ernakulam.

Sunder, who generally takes around one month to finish the music for a film, took three months for Pulimurugan and worked in two schedules. Without any short-notices, Vysakh gave Sunder enough time to compose the score. He composed while watching a rough version of the film before the final editing. At that time, the computer-generated imagery of the tiger was at its early stage and far from perfect, so Sunder had to envisage the tiger while composing for these scenes.

The first music video from the film, "Kaadaniyum Kalchilambe" sung by Yesudas and Chithra, was released via YouTube on 14 September 2016—the day of the Hindu festival Thiruvonam. The song features Mohanlal and Mukherji enjoying their country life. Nivedita Mishra of Hindustan Times said, "It is a paean to marriage ... Kaadaniyum Kalchilambe is a beautiful celebration of Kerala—so lush and so soothing to the eye and so lovingly captured by cinematographer Shaji Kumar". Anjana George of The Times of India also gave a positive review, highlighting its visuals and saying, "while beautifully showcasing the chemistry between Lal [Mohanlal] and Kamalini, the director has also tried to capture the magical splendour of forest. The lovely shades of green, yellow, orange and blue are being magnificently used in the visuals." On 11 October 2016, in response to audience demand, Sundar released the theme song attached with a video of the making of the film. The film's second music video, "Manathe Marikurumbe" sung by Jairam, was released on 27 October 2016.
