= Pindimedu Waterfalls =

Pundimedu Waterfalls is situated in dense forest, 8 kilometers away from Pooyamkutty town of Kuttampuzha Grama Panchayath, 44 kilometres from Kothamangalam town in the Ernakulam district of Kerala. This is the highest waterfall in Kerala. It is in the Karinthiri river, a tributary of the Periyar river. In 1981, KSEB had designed a Rs 250-crore project to build a hydro-electric power plant that is similar to the Idukki dam with a capacity of 1000 megawatts. Then the Chief Minister AK Antony tried to implement the project in 2001 with the new design being transformed into a 210 MW capacity, but the Government of India abandoned the project due to the government's environmental economic problems. With the arrival of the Mohanlal starred film Pulimurugan, the whole of Kerala has gained fame.
