= Peter Hein =

Indian action choreographer

- Hein in 2016
- Born: 12 August 1973 (age 53); Karaikal, Puducherry, India
- Other name: Hein
- Occupations: Action choreographer; stunt co-ordinator; actor; film director
- Years active: 1992–present
- Spouse: Parvathy
- Children: 2

Peter Hein (Vietnamese: Peter Hiền) is an Indian action choreographer and stunt coordinator known for his work in Tamil, Telugu, Malayalam, Hindi, and Kannada films. He is known for choreographing action sequences in films such as Anniyan (2005), Athadu (2005), Chatrapathi (2005), Sivaji (2007), Ghajini (2008), Magadheera (2009), Enthiran (2010), 7 Aum Arivu (2011), Baahubali (2015 & 2017), Pulimurugan (2016), and Kalki 2898 AD (2024).

Hein won a Filmfare Award for Best Action for his work in Ghajini and was the first recipient of the National Film Award for Best Stunt Choreographer for his work in Pulimurugan. He was also nominated for a Taurus World Stunt Award. Several stunt coordinators, including Ram Lakshman, Anal Arasu, Silva, Dhilip Subbarayan, and Anbariv, have worked as his assistants or fighters.

== Early life and career ==
Hein was born in Karaikal, Puducherry, India to a Tamil father and Vietnamese mother. He grew up in Chennai's Vadapalani neighbourhood. His father, Perumal worked as an assistant fight master in Tamil films. Later, Hein started his career as an extra fighter and assistant fight master for many Tamil, Telugu and Malayalam films. During the initial days of his career, he worked as assistant to action directors Kanal Kannan and Vijayan. During his early days he was body double for heroes as well as heroines.

His debut film as "fight master " was in Gautham Vasudev Menon's debut directorial Minnale (2001). Krishna Vamsi, a Telugu film director recognised his sincerity and dedication and offered him the chance to direct the action sequences for the film Murari which was also dubbed into Tamil. From then on, he became a full-length action film director, action co-ordinator and stunt director for various Telugu and Tamil films.

Peter Hein acquired recognition from critics and media for his work in several films such as Anji, Run, and Kaakha Kaakha and it was his work in films such as Varsham, Anniyan, Athadu, Chatrapati and so on that brought him critical acclaim. Ram Gopal Varma introduced him to Bollywood with the film James. Mani Ratnam was very much impressed with his work in films like Athadu, Anniyan and Sivaji and enrolled him to direct the stunt sequences for the film Raavan. However, due to scheduling conflicts with Magadheera, Hein has done limited work for Raavan. He was the first recipient of the National Film Award for Best Stunt Choreographer for his work in Pulimurugan (2016). He also directed the 2021 Indo-Vietnamese film Sám Hối: The Living Sandbag.

== Filmography ==
Year	Title	Language	Notes
2001	Minnale	Tamil	First movie as full-time action director
2001	Murari	Telugu	Telugu debut
2001	Middle Class Madhavan	Tamil	
2001	Student No.1	Telugu	
2001	Snehituda	Telugu	
2002	Roja Kootam	Tamil	
2002	Santosham	Telugu	
2002	Run	Tamil	
2002	April Maadhathil	Tamil	
2002	Gummalam	Tamil	
2003	Naaga	Telugu	
2003	Arasu	Tamil	
2003	Punnagai Poove	Tamil	
2003	Pudhiya Geethai	Tamil	
2003	Parthiban Kanavu	Tamil	
2003	Paarai	Tamil	
2003	Vellithira	Malayalam	Malayalam debut
2003	Kadhal Kisu Kisu	Tamil	
2003	Kaakha Kaakha	Tamil	
2003	Alaudin	Tamil	
2003	Alai	Tamil	
2003	Ottran	Tamil	
2003	Anjaneya	Tamil	
2003	Thirumalai	Tamil	
2003	Enakku 20 Unakku 18; Nee Manasu Naaku Telusu	Tamil; Telugu	
2003	Malsaram	Malayalam	
2004	Varsham	Telugu	
2004	Pudhukottaiyilirundhu Saravanan	Tamil	
2004	Anji	Telugu	
2004	Kanninum Kannadikkum	Malayalam	
2004	Puttintiki Ra Chelli	Telugu	
2004	Jana	Tamil	
2004	Run	Hindi	Hindi debut
2004	New; Naani	Tamil; Telugu	
2004	Adavi Ramudu	Telugu	
2004	Aparichithan	Malayalam	
2004	Gharshana	Telugu	
2004	Gowri	Telugu	
2004	Bose	Tamil	
2004	7G Rainbow Colony	Tamil	
2005	Anniyan	Tamil	
2005	Athadu	Telugu	
2005	Ponniyin Selvan	Tamil	
2005	James	Hindi	
2005	Chatrapati	Telugu	
2005	Mazhai	Tamil	
2006	Family: Ties of Blood	Hindi	
2006	Aathi	Tamil	
2006	Pournami	Telugu	
2006	Veerabhadra	Telugu	
2006	Bommarillu	Telugu	
2006	Sainikudu	Telugu	
2007	Munna	Telugu	
2007	Aata	Telugu	
2007	Sivaji: The Boss	Tamil	
2008	Satya in Love	Kannada	Kannada debut
2008	Tashan	Hindi	
2008	Ready	Telugu	
2008	Heroes	Hindi	
2008	Ghajini	Hindi	
2009	Ek: The Power of One	Hindi	
2009	Magadheera	Telugu	
2010	Darling	Telugu	
2010	Raavan	Hindi	
2010	Raavanan	Tamil	
2010	Maryada Ramanna	Telugu	
2010	Enthiran: The Robot	Tamil	
2010	Khaleja	Telugu	
2010	Brindaavanam	Telugu	
2010	Ramaa: The Saviour	Hindi	
2010	Orange	Telugu	
2011	Ko	Tamil	
2011	Badrinath	Telugu	
2011	D-17	Malayalam	
2011	Dookudu	Telugu	
2011	7 Aum Arivu	Tamil	
2012	Agent Vinod	Hindi	
2012	Super Six	Sinhala	
2012	Endukante Premanta	Telugu	
2012	Julai	Telugu	SIIMA Awards For The Best stunt choreographer
2012	Maattrraan	Tamil	
2013	Race 2	Hindi	
2013	Atharintiki Daaredi	Telugu	
2014	1: Nenokkadine	Telugu	
2014	Yevadu	Telugu	
2014	Kochadaiyaan	Tamil	
2014	Govindudu Andarivadele	Telugu	
2015	Dohchay	Telugu	
2015	Ranna	Kannada	
2015	Baahubali: The Beginning	Telugu Tamil	
2015	Rudramadevi	Telugu	
2016	Pulimurugan	Malayalam	National Film Award For The Best Stunt Choreographer
2017	Baahubali 2: The Conclusion	Telugu Tamil	
2017	Spyder	Telugu Tamil	
2017	Aramm	Tamil	
2018	Gulebakavali	Tamil	
2018	Touch Chesi Chudu	Telugu	
2018	Naa Peru Surya	Telugu	
2018	Odiyan	Malayalam	
2019	Petta	Tamil	
2019	Irupathiyonnaam Noottaandu	Malayalam	
2019	Natasaarvabhowma	Kannada	
2019	Madhura Raja	Malayalam	
2019	Kaappaan	Tamil	
2019	Asuran	Tamil	
2019	Jack & Daniel	Malayalam	Special appearance
2020	Darbar	Tamil	
2020	Bhuj: The Pride of India	Hindi	
2020	Ka Pae Ranasingam	Tamil	
2021	Sám Hối	Vietnamese	Vietnamese debut
2021	Aranmanai 3	Tamil	
2021	Pushpa: The Rise	Telugu	
2022	Ramarao on Duty	Telugu	
2022	God Father	Telugu	
2022	Laththi Charge	Tamil	
2023	Varisu	Tamil	
2023	Viduthalai Part 1	Tamil	
2023	Kushi	Telugu	
2023	Mark Antony	Tamil	
2024	Rathnam	Tamil	
2024	Kalki 2898 AD	Telugu	
2024	Indian 2	Tamil	
2024	Idiyan Chanthu	Malayalam	
2024	Raayan	Tamil	
2024	Devara	Telugu	
2024	Pushpa 2: The Rule	Telugu	
2024	Viduthalai Part 2	Tamil	
2025	Jaat	Hindi	
2025	Hari Hara Veera Mallu: Part 1	Telugu	
2025	Kiss	Tamil	
2025	They Call Him OG	Telugu	
2025	Idli Kadai	Tamil	
2026	Love Insurance Kompany	Tamil	
2026	Angikaaram	Tamil	
2026	Mandaadi	Tamil	
2026	Anbil Avan	Tamil	
2027	Arasan	Tamil	
2027	Dragon	Telugu	

=== As actor ===
Year	Title		Language	Notes
2003	Ottran		Tamil	Special Appearance
2004	Gowri		Telugu	Special Appearance
2004	Pudhukottaiyilirundhu Saravanan	Chinese Immigrant	Tamil	
2011	Ko		Tamil	Special Appearance
2016	Pulimurugan		Malayalam	Special Appearance
2019	Jack & Daniel	Himself	Malayalam	Special Appearance

=== As extra fighter ===
Year	Title	Language	Notes
1992	Kaviya Thalaivan	Tamil	
1993	Band Master	Tamil	
1993	Amaravathy	Tamil	
1994	Veettai Paaru Naattai Paaru	Tamil	
1994	Priyanka	Tamil	
1994	Madhumitha	Tamil	
1994	Sarigamapadani	Tamil	
1994	Akkarai Seemaiyile	Tamil	
1994	Pudhiya Mannargal	Tamil	
1995	Vishnu	Tamil	
1995	Periya Kudumbam	Tamil	
1995	Chandralekha	Tamil	
1995	Muthu	Tamil	
1995	Seethanam	Tamil	
1995	Manathile Oru Paattu	Tamil	
1996	Parambarai	Tamil	
1996	Namma Ooru Rasa	Tamil	
1996	Sengottai	Tamil	
1996	Thuraimugam	Tamil	
1996	Avvai Shanmughi	Tamil	
1996	Mr. Romeo	Tamil	
1996	Selva	Tamil	
1997	Hitler	Telugu	
1997	Sakthi	Tamil	
1997	Aravindhan	Tamil	
1997	Adimai Changili	Tamil	
1998	Rathna	Tamil	
1999	Thullatha Manamum Thullum	Tamil	
1999	Padayappa	Tamil	
1999	Jodi	Tamil	
1999	Mudhalvan	Tamil	
2000	Uyirile Kalanthathu	Tamil	

=== As assistant ===
- Raavanaprabhu (2001) – Second assistant; choreographed by Mohanlal v/s Siddique Highway fights and the climax fights also.

== Awards ==
Won

- 2002 Dinakaran Award for Best Stunt Master - Run
- 2004 Tamil Nadu State Film Award for Best Stunt Coordinator – Bose
- 2005 Filmfare Award for Best Action Director - South – Anniyan
- 2010 Edison Awards – Enthiran: The Robot
- 2011 Tamil Nadu State Film Award for Best Stunt Coordinator – Ko
- 2011 South Indian International Movie Awards: Sensation of South Indian cinema
- 2011 Norway Tamil Film Festival Award for Best Stunt Choreographer - Ko
- 2015 Nandi Award for Best Fight Master - Baahubali: The Beginning
- 2016 National Film Award for Best Stunt Choreographer – Pulimurugan
- 2017 Special jury award-19th Asianet film awards
- 2019 Norway Tamil Film Festival Award for Best Stunt Choreographer - Asuran
- 2021 V4 Entertainers Award for Best Stunt Director - Darbar

Nominated

- 2007 Vijay Award for Best Stunt Director – Sivaji: The Boss
- 2010 Taurus World Stunt Award for Best Action in a Foreign Film – Raavanan
- 2010 Vijay Award for Best Stunt Director – Enthiran: The Robot
- 2011 Vijay Award for Best Stunt Director – 7 Aum Arivu
- 2012 Vijay Award for Best Stunt Director – Maattrraan
- 2012 South Indian International Movie Awards for Best Fight Choreographer – Maattrraan
- 2016 Asianet Film Awards Special Jury Award – Pulimurugan
- 2017 Edison Awards - Spyder
- 2022 Ananda Vikatan Award for Best Stunt Director - Laththi Charge
- 2023 Ananda Vikatan Award for Best Stunt Director - Viduthalai Part 1
