= Ramaleela (2017 film) =

2017 Indian political thriller film

- Theatrical release poster
- Directed by: Arun Gopy
- Written by: Sachy
- Produced by: Tomichan Mulakuppadam
- Starring: Dileep; Mukesh; Radhika; Prayaga Martin; Kalabhavan Shajon; Vijayaraghavan; Siddique
- Cinematography: Shaji Kumar
- Edited by: Vivek Harshan
- Music by: Gopi Sundar
- Production company: Mulakuppadam Films
- Distributed by: Mulakuppadam Release
- Release date: 28 September 2017 (India)
- Running time: 158 minutes
- Country: India
- Language: Malayalam
- Budget: est. ₹14 crore
- Box office: est. ₹55 crore

Ramaleela (transl. Raman's play) is a 2017 Indian Malayalam-language political thriller film written by Sachy and directed by Arun Gopy (in his directorial debut). It stars Dileep, Radhika, Prayaga Martin, Mukesh, Kalabhavan Shajon, Vijayaraghavan and Siddique. The film is produced and distributed by Tomichan Mulakuppadam under Mulakuppadam Films.

Ramaleela was released in India on 28 September 2017. and received positive reviews from critics. The film was the highest-grossing Malayalam film of 2017.

== Plot ==
Advocate Ramanunni is an MLA of Ayikkara in Palakkad District who gets expelled from his political communist party, the Communist Democratic Party (CDP) for assaulting the District Secretary Ambadi Mohanan and joins the rival secularist party, the NSP. Ramanunni, who has been receiving threats from CDP activists, decides to take a gun license for self-protection and this becomes a controversy in the news. Ramanunni's mother Ragini disapproves of his decision to join the National Secularist Party (NSP) as they come from a communist-oriented family and his father Raghavan, a CDP activist who is believed to have been martyred by NSP activists. The NSP decides to appoint Ramanunni as their candidate in the upcoming election.

The decision is opposed by Udayabhanu, a veteran politician of the NSP but this is overlooked by the others. Ramanunni, along with his sidekick Thomas Chacko alias TC, the NSP Youth Wing Secretary, attend an interview where Mohanan assaults Ramanunni. As the promotions for the elections begin, the CDP announces their candidate as Ragini, who they think is the only person who can defeat Ramanunni. While campaigning at a football match, Mohanan is shot dead and Ramanunni and TC become the prime suspects. The Investigation Officer, Paulson Devassy, who is also present at the assassination point, finds out that Ramanunni's gun is missing a bullet. Ballistics match the bullet that killed Mohanan with the bullets in Ramanunni's gun, and shows that the gun must have been fired from the row where Ramanunni and TC were sitting.

Ramanunni and TC escape police custody and hide in the house of V.G. Madhavan, a journalist and a good friend of Ramanunni. Madhavan's daughter Helena decides to help them. Now in disguise, they leave for a resort on an island off the coast of Goa. Unknown to Ramanunni and TC, Helena televises all their actions through hidden cameras under the name of 'Hot Pursuit' in order to find the real culprit. With Ramanunni gone, the NSP appoints Sumesh Venjara, a disliked and weak politician as their new candidate. In Goa, Ramanunni reveals that it was Ambadi Mohanan and Udayabhanu who were behind his father's death and not the NSP activists.

As the videos get televised, Paulson Devassy gathers evidence of Mohanan's death that leads to Udayabhanu; especially a can of Red Bull that was used as a suppressor since Udayabhanu was very fond of the drink. Police later arrests him. It is revealed that televising Ramanunni's escape was his and Helena's plan to prove his innocence. Ramanunni goes on to win the election as an independent candidate. In a major twist, it turns out that it was actually Ramanunni who had assassinated Ambadi Mohanan with the help of a fellow CDP comrade Chandran. He accused Udayabhanu because of his role in his father's death. He explains to his mother that it was his duty to remove all obstacles from the CDP's path. His mother salutes Ramanunni, and he does the same back.

== Cast ==
- Dileep as Adv. K.R. Ramanunni MLA
- Mukesh as DYSP Paulson Devassy
- Radhika Sarathkumar as Ragini Raghavan, Ramanunni's mother
- Prayaga Martin as Helena Madhavan, Ramanunni's love interest
- Kalabhavan Shajohn as Thomas Chacko (TC), Ramanunni's friend
- Siddique as Udayabhanu
- Vijayaraghavan as Saghavu Ambadi Mohanan, The main antagonist
- Suresh Krishna as Theekuni Chandran
- Renji Panicker as V.G. Madhavan
- Lena as TV reporter Olga John
- Ashokan as Commissioner Balachandran IPS
- Saikumar as Chief Minister P. Sugathan
- G. Suresh Kumar as Sagar Nagambadam
- Sadiq as Saghavu Rajan
- Kalabhavan Shaju as Prakashan
- Anil Murali as Sudhi, Udayabhanu's Assistant
- Ameer Niyas as CI Deepak
- Salim Kumar as Sumesh Venjara
- Prasanth Alexander as Satheesan Party worker
- Sundar Pandian as Party worker
- Sreejith Ravi as Trainer Siby Chacko
- Chali Pala as SI Soman
- Manju Satheesh as Sumithra CDP Member
- Tomichan Mulakuppadam as Himself (Cameo Appearance)
- Romin Anthony as Ajay
- Abhishek Raveendran
- Diya Parveen as Journalist
- Murali as Sakhavu Raghavan, Ramanunni's father (Photo Archive)
- Vinod Kedamangalam as Driver Pushpan

== Production ==
The film is produced and distributed by Tomichan Mulakuppadam under the production company Mulakuppadam Films. It was made with a budget of ₹14 crore. Gopi Sundar composed the music. Through Ramaleela, Radhika returned to act in Malayalam cinema after a gap of 23 years. Principal photography began on 9 December 2016 in Kochi, Kerala. Filming also held at Palakkad, Thiruvananthapuram, and in Maldives .

== Release ==
Ramaleela's release was delayed on account of actor Dileep's arrest for conspiracy to kidnap and attempt to rape of actress Bhavana. Despite calls for a boycott, the film released in India on 28 September 2017. It released across 129 screens in Kerala.

=== Box office ===
The film collected ₹55 crore at the box office. The film was a major commercial success and was the highest grossing Malayalam movie of the year.

== Soundtrack ==
Music: Gopi Sundar, Lyrics: B. K. Harinarayanan

No.	Title	Singer(s)	Length
1.	"Ivide Ivide Ee Mannil"	Madhu Balakrishnan
2.	"Nenjileri Theeye"	Harish Sivaramakrishnan, Gopi Sundar
3.	"Ramleela"	Harish Sivaramakrishnan
4.	"Sada Kudayana Nethaavu"	Karthik, Afsal
