= Manikuttan =

Indian actor (born 1986)

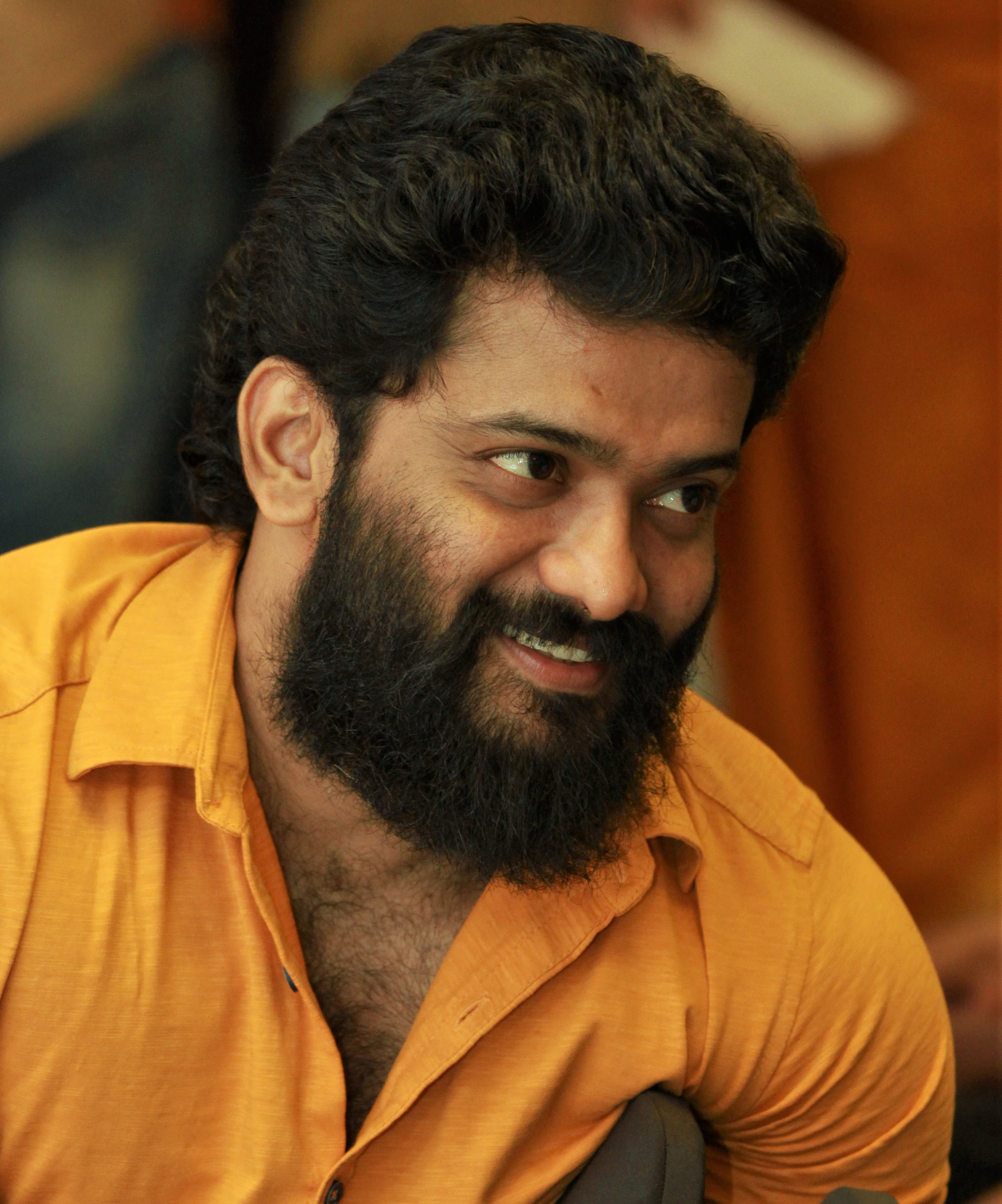
- Manikuttan in 2019
- Born: Thomas James; 2 March 1986 (age 40); Thiruvananthapuram, Kerala, India
- Education: Mahatma Gandhi College
- Occupation: Actor
- Years active: 1999–present

Thomas James (born 2 March 1986), better known by his stage name Manikuttan, is an Indian actor who works primarily in Malayalam films. He is known for his role as Kayamkulam Kochunni in the 2004 television serial of the same title. He was also a part of the Kerala Strikers team in Celebrity Cricket League for several years. In 2021, he participated and won the third season of the reality show Bigg Boss.

== Early life ==
Thomas James was born in Thiruvananthapuram, Kerala, India. He attended St. Mary's Higher Secondary School in Pattom, Thiruvananthapuram, and graduated with a Bachelor of Commerce from Mahatma Gandhi College.

== Career ==
Manikuttan debuted as a child artist in Varnachirakukal (1999). He made his debut as a lead actor in the film Oru Peelekanenta Oormakke (2004). His first film appearance was in the Malayalam film Boyy Friennd (2005), directed by Vinayan. He has since acted in films such as Mamangam (2019), and Marakkar: Lion of the Arabian Sea (2021).

== Filmography ==
Key
†	Denotes films that have not yet been released

- All films are in Malayalam language unless otherwise noted.

=== Film ===
Year	Title	Role	Note
1999	Varnachirakukal	Balu	Child artist
2005	Boyy Friennd	Ramesh Prasad	
2006	Bada Dosth	Nandu	
2007	Mayavi	Satheesh	
2007	Black Cat	Himself	Special appearance
2007	Chotta Mumbai	Sainu	
2007	Heart Beats	Manu Idikkula	
2007	Hareendran Oru Nishkalankan	Alex	
2007	Flash		
2007	Kalabham	Parthasarathy	
2008	Kurukshetra	Naik Prakash	
2008	Twenty:20	Reji	Special appearance in the song "Hey Dil Deewana"
2008	Minnaminnikoottam	Minister's son	Cameo appearance
2008	Positive	Udayan	
2009	Passenger	Sudheendran	
2009	Dr. Patient	Rafeeq	
2009	Meghatheertham	Young Balunarayanan	
2009	Swantham Lekhakan	Vinod Raghavan	
2010	Valiyangadi	Ananthu	
2010	Thathwamasi	Lord Rama	
2010	Chaverpada	Ameer Sulthan	
2010	Elsamma Enna Aankutty	Jerry	
2010	Four Friends	Vishnu	
2011	Doctor Love	Venkidi	
2011	Padmasree Bharat Dr. Saroj Kumar	Cadet Rajesh	
2012	Kunjaliyan	Vinayan	
2012	Karmayogi		
2012	Grandmaster	Eby Kuriakose	
2012	Thattathin Marayathu	Najaf	
2012	Simhasanam	Suresh	
2012	Scene Onnu Nammude Veedu	Rafique	
2013	Hotel California	Sharath	
2013	Crocodile Love Story	Sreeraj	
2014	God's Own Country	Zakir	
2014	Snehamulloral Koodeyullappol	Sabarinath	
2015	Loham	Jayan's brother	
2016	Pavada	SI Suresh Kumar	
2016	Karinkunnam 6'S	Vishnu	
2016	Oppam	Devayani's brother	
2017	1971: Beyond Borders	Soldier	
2017	Masterpiece	Singer	Cameo appearance
2018	Kammara Sambhavam	Thilakan	
2018	Nimir	Shenbaghavalli's husband	Tamil film
2018	Irumbu Thirai	Kathir's colleague	Tamil film
2019	Mamangam	Moyin	
2019	Thrissur Pooram	Ali	
2019	An International Local Story	Himself	Special appearance
2021	Marakkar: Lion of the Arabian Sea	Mayinkutty	
2023	Divorce	Ramdas	
2024	Kuruvipappa	Dance Master	
2024	Nadikar	David's co-actor in a film	Cameo appearance
2024	Sree Muthappan	Muthappan	
2024	Secret	Harishankar	
2025	Empuraan	Mani	
2025	The Protector	Sreekuttan	
2026	Sukhamano Sukhamann	Sony	
2026	Bouma	Shahul Majeed	

=== Television ===
Year	Title	Role	Channel	Notes
2004	Black and White		Asianet	
2004-2007	Kayamkulam Kochunni	Kayamkulam Kochunni	Surya TV	
2008	Devi Mathathmyam		Asianet	
2009	Idea Star Singer	Guest	Asianet	
2016	Asianet Comedy Awards	Host	Asianet	
2018	Super Jodi	Host	Surya TV	
2018	Rana Maharani	Host	Surya TV	
2021	Navarasa	Shanmugam	Netflix	Tamil television series
2021	Bigg Boss (Malayalam season 3)	Contestant	Asianet	Winner
2023	Comedy Stars (season 3)	Celebrity Judge	Asianet	
2023	Katturumbu (season 2)	Judge	Flowers TV	
2026	Drama Juniors (season 2)	Judge	Zee Keralam	
