= Mulakuppadam Films =

Indian film production and distribution company

- Type: Private; Film production Film distribution
- Industry: Entertainment; Motion picture
- Founded: Kochi, in 2007; 19 years ago
- Founder: Tomichan Mulakuppadam
- Headquarters: Kochi, Kerala, India
- Key people: Tomichan Mulakuppadam
- Products: Films; Music
- Website: mulakuppadamfilms.com

Mulakuppadam Films is an Indian film production and distribution company founded by businessman Tomichan Mulakuppadam. Formed in 2007, head office of Mulakuppadam Films is situated in Kochi, Kerala.

== History ==
Mulakuppadam Films debuted in film production through the 2007 Malayalam film Flash, directed by Sibi Malayil starred Mohanlal in lead role. They distributed Malayalam films Minnaminnikoottam and Lollipop in 2008 through Mulakuppadam Release.

Mulakuppadam Films got a break through the 2010 Malayalam film Pokkiri Raja, directed by Vysakh which starred Mammootty and Prithviraj Sukumaran in lead roles. The film was made on a budget of ₹7.80 crores, the gross collection was ₹13 crores. It became highest-grossing Malayalam film of 2010.

The production of Pulimurugan, directed by Vysakh and starring Mohanlal and Jagapathi Babu in lead role, started in mid-2015. The film was made for a budget of ₹ 55 crore, making it one of the most expensive Malayalam films until then. The film was a records breaker at the box office and eventually became the highest-grossing Malayalam film in history. Until 7 November 2016, the film grossed ₹105 crore worldwide, thus Pulimurugan became the first Malayalam film to gross ₹100 crore at the box office. It has grossed more than ₹152 crore worldwide, it establishing the first "100 crore club" and "150 crore club" in the Malayalam film industry.

In 2017, their next production Ramaleela directed by debutant Arun Gopy and starring Dileep was released.

In 2020, there were talks on producing Ottakomban directed by Mathew Thomas and starring Suresh Gopi. However the project was later taken over by Sree Gokulam Movies.

== Mulakuppadam Release ==
The films produced are distributed through Mulakuppadam Release which is the associated distribution company formed with Mulakuppadam Films.

== Films ==
=== Production ===
No.	Title	Year	Director	Notes
1	Flash	2007	Sibi Malayil	
2	Pokkiri Raja	2010	Vysakh	
3	Four Friends	2010	Saji Surendran	
4	Kunjaliyan	2012	Saji Surendran	
5	Pulimurugan	2016	Vysakh	
6	Ramaleela	2017	Arun Gopy	
7	Irupathiyonnaam Noottaandu	2019	Arun Gopy	

|- | 2019 || Kaappaan || Tamil || Kerala |- | 2019 || Avane Srimannarayana || Kannada || Kerala |}
