= Mamalakandam =

- Village
- Nickname: Mamala
- Country: India
- State: Kerala
- Elevation: 1,200 m (3,900 ft)

Languages
  - Official: Malayalam, English
- Time zone: UTC+5:30 (IST)
- PIN: 686681
- Telephone code: 0485

Mamalakandam is a village located around 32 km from Kothamangalam taluk in Ernakulam district. It is located with an average elevation of 500 meters above sea level. The village became a known tourist attraction in Kothamangalam Taluk, after some vloggers posted the village's government high school photo in social media, that has the Elampassery waterfall in the backdrop.
