= Tomichan Mulakuppadam =

Indian businessman

Tomi Elvunkal
- Born: Thomas Antony
- Occupations: Businessman; Film producer; Film distributor
- Years active: 2007 – present
- Spouse: Rosakutty
- Children: 3
- Website: Official website

Thomas Antony, better known as Tomichan Mulakuppadam is an Indian businessman, film producer and film distributor who works in the Malayalam film industry. He owns the production house Mulakuppadam Films. He is a non-resident Indian businessman with no previous background in cinema, according to him, he entered into film production for his passion for films. He is best known for producing Pulimurugan (2016) starring Mohanlal, which is the first film to create "100 Crore Club" and "150 Crore Club" in Malayalam film industry.

== Career ==
He ventured into film production in 2007 by producing the film Flash, starring Parvathy and Mohanlal. But the film did not performed well at the box office. His high-budget action film Pokkiri Raja (2010) directed by Vysakh and starring Mammootty was a commercial success. He attained wide popularity after he produced the high-budget action film Pulimurugan starring Mohanlal. The film's production cost was ₹25 crore, such an investment in a film industry with just 30 million audience was considered quite risky by the film industry. The film turned out to be the highest-grossing film in the history of Malayalam cinema. It is the first Malayalam film in history to create "100 Crore Club" in film industry by grossing over ₹100 crore at the box office within its 30-day theatrical run. After Pulimurugan, he produced his next venture starring Dileep, titled Ramaleela, a political thriller released in September 2017.

== Personal life ==
Tomichan Mulakuppadam is based in Abu Dhabi. He is married to Rosakutty, they have three children—Romin, Nisha, and Roshan. Romin acted in a role in Pulimurugan as Lal's teenage role and as a spy journalist in Ramaleela.
