= A. M. Rathnam =

Indian film producer

- Born: Arani Muni Rathnam; Buchireddypalem, Nellore district, Andhra Pradesh, India
- Occupations: Producer; lyricist; screenwriter; director
- Children: Jyothi Krishna; Ravi Krishna
- Awards: Filmfare Awards South
- Honours: Kalaimamani 2018

Arani Muni Rathnam is an Indian film producer, lyricist, screenwriter, and director known for his works in Telugu and Tamil cinema. Under Sri Surya Movies Entertainment, a movie production house he owns in Hyderabad, he has produced blockbusters in Telugu such as Karthavyam (1990), Peddarikam (1992), Sneham Kosam (1999), and Kushi (2001). He ventured into Tamil cinema in 1996 with the blockbuster Indian, which was India's Official Entry for the Best Foreign Language Film at the Academy Awards. He then produced films such as Natpukkaga, Kadhalar Dhinam, Kushi, Run, Dhool, Kovil, Ghilli, 7G Rainbow Colony, Sivakasi, Dharmapuri, Arrambam, Yennai Arindhaal and Vedalam.

== Personal life ==
Rathnam was born into a Telugu speaking family at Buchireddypalem of Nellore district, Andhra Pradesh. Rathnam has two sons, director and actor Jyothi Krishna and actor Ravi Krishna. Jyothi Krishna's directorial debut Enakku 20 Unakku 18 and its Telugu version, as well as Ravi Krishna's first four films, that also include Jyothi Krishna's second directorial venture Kedi, were all produced by Rathnam himself.

In 2012, he built a temple for Shirdi Sai Baba at his office in Valasaravakkam.

== Career ==
Rathnam started his career as a make-up man for superstar actress Vijayashanti. Being the Executive Producer for the actress, he produced his first film Karthavyam, in 1990. Vijayashanti won the National Award for the Best Actress for this film. He made films with Kamal Haasan, Pawan Kalyan Vijay, Ajith Kumar, Chiranjeevi, Vikram and many other actors. He later began producing films in Tamil and Hindi as well, dubbing and releasing several films in other languages. He went on to finance Shankar's Indian, which earned him the Filmfare Award for Best Film – Tamil and was later submitted by India for the Academy Award for Best Foreign Language Film, Nayak: The Real Hero and Sneham Kosam starring Chiranjeevi.

Rathnam produced the Tamil romance film Kushi, starring Vijay and its same-titled Telugu remake the following year, starring Pawan Kalyan, both of which were directed by S. J. Surya and became highly successful. Later, he produced two more films, Ghilli and Sivakasi starring Vijay. Both Ghilli and Sivakasi were highly successful at the box office. During the early 1990s, he directed two films Peddarikam and Sankalpam in Telugu. He has also written the screenplay for the film Naaga. Later, he changed the name of his production company from Sri Surya Movies Entertainment to Shri Sai Raam Creations, which is now headed by S. Aishwarya. He had done three films with Ajith Kumar such as Arrambam, Yennai Arindhaal and Vedalam, all of which were huge successes.

== Awards ==
Filmfare Awards South

- Filmfare Award for Best Film - Telugu – Karthavyam (1990)
- Filmfare Award for Best Film – Tamil – Indian (1996)
- Filmfare Award for Best Film – Tamil – Natpukkaga (1998)

Tamil Nadu State Film Awards

- Tamil Nadu State Film Award for Best Film (First Prize) – Indian (1996)
- Tamil Nadu State Film Award for Best Film (First Prize) – Natpukkaga (1998)

Others

- Cinema Express Award for Best Film – Tamil – Indian (1996)

== Filmography ==
=== As producer ===
Year	Film	Language	Notes	Production company
1989	Dharma Yuddham	Telugu		Bhageeratha Art Pictures
1990	Karthavyam	Telugu	Filmfare Award for Best Film - Telugu	Sri Surya Movies
1992	Peddarikam	Telugu	Also Screenplay & Direction; Remake of Godfather	Sri Surya Movies
1993	Aasayam	Telugu		Sri Surya Movies
1994	Tejasvini	Hindi		Chandra-Surya Movies Pvt. Ltd
1995	Sankalpam	Telugu	Also Screenplay & Direction; Remake of Mithunam	Surya Chitra
1996	Indian	Tamil	Filmfare Award for Best Film – Tamil; Cinema Express Award for Best Film – Tamil; Dubbed into Hindi as Hindustani and Telugu as Bharateeyudu	Sri Surya Movies
1998	Natpukkaga	Tamil	Filmfare Award for Best Film – Tamil	Sri Surya Movies
1998	Ellame En Pondattithaan	Tamil		Sri Surya Movies
1999	Sneham Kosam	Telugu	Remake of Natpukkaga	Sri Surya Movies
1999	Kadhalar Dhinam	Tamil	Dubbed into Hindi as Dil Hi Dil Mein and Telugu as Premikula Roju	Sri Surya Movies
2000	Kushi	Tamil		Sri Surya Movies
2001	Khushi	Telugu		Sri Surya Movies
2001	Nayak: The Real Hero	Hindi	Remake of Mudhalvan	Sri Surya Movies
2002	Run	Tamil	Dubbed into Telugu with the same title	Sri Surya Movies
2003	Dhool	Tamil		Sri Surya Movies
2003	Naaga	Telugu	Also Screenplay	Sri Surya Movies
2003	Boys	Tamil	Dubbed into Telugu as same title	Sri Surya Movies
2003	Enakku 20 Unakku 18	Tamil	Bilingual in Telugu as Nee Manasu Naaku Telusu	Sri Surya Movies
2004	Kovil	Tamil		Sri Surya Movies
2004	Ghilli	Tamil	Remake of Okkadu	Sri Surya Movies
2004	7/G Rainbow Colony	Tamil	Bilingual in Telugu as 7G Brundavan Colony	Sri Surya Movies
2005	Ponniyin Selvan	Tamil		Sri Surya Movies
2005	Sivakasi	Tamil		Sri Surya Movies
2006	Bangaram	Telugu		Sri Surya Movies
2006	Kedi	Tamil		Sri Surya Movies
2006	Dharmapuri	Tamil		Sri Surya Movies
2008	Bheemaa	Tamil		Sri Surya Movies
2013	Arrambam	Tamil		Sri Sathya Sai Movies
2015	Yennai Arindhaal	Tamil		Sri Sai Raam Creations
2015	Vedalam	Tamil		Sri Sai Raam Creations
2017	Karuppan	Tamil		Sri Sai Raam Creations
2017	Oxygen	Telugu		Sri Sai Raam Creations
2023	Rules Ranjann	Telugu		Starlight Entertainment
2025	Hari Hara Veera Mallu	Telugu		Mega Surya Production
TBA	7/G Rainbow Colony 2 †	Tamil	Bilingual in Telugu as 7G Brundavan Colony 2	Sri Surya Movies

=== As distributor ===
- Vyjayanthi IPS (1990, Tamil dubbed version)
- Gentleman (1993, Telugu dubbed version)
- Premikudu (1994, Telugu dubbed version)
- Bombayi (1995, Telugu dubbed version)
- The King (1995, Tamil dubbed version)
- Bharathiyudu (1996, Telugu dubbed version)
- Unnaiye Kalyanam Pannikiren (1996, Tamil dubbed version)
- Premalekha (1997, Telugu dubbed version)
- Arunachalam (1997, Telugu dubbed version)
- Ullaasam (1997, Telugu dubbed version)
- Jeans (1998, Telugu dubbed version)
- Anandha Mazhai (1998, Tamil dubbed version)
- Narasimha (1999, Telugu dubbed version)
- Premikula Roju (1999, Telugu dubbed version)
- Oke Okkadu (1999, Telugu dubbed version)
- Priyuralu Pilichindi (2000, Telugu dubbed version)
- Run (2003, Telugu dubbed version)
- Boys (2003, Telugu dubbed version)
- Sukran (2005, Tamil Nadu release)
- Muddula Koduku (2005, Telugu dubbed version)
- Jaadu (2006, Telugu dubbed version)
- Bheemaa (2008, Telugu dubbed version)

=== As lyricist ===
- Jeans - Telugu version
- Boys - Telugu version
- Naaga - Entha Chinna Muddu, Macarina, Oka Konte, Megham Karigenu
