= Diggajaru =

2001 film by D. Rajendra Babu

- VCD cover
- Directed by: D. Rajendra Babu
- Written by: B. A. Madhu (dialogues)
- Story by: Jyothi Krishna
- Based on: Natpukkaga
- Produced by: Rockline Venkatesh
- Starring: Vishnuvardhan; Ambareesh; Sanghavi; Tara; Umashree
- Cinematography: P. K. H. Das
- Edited by: Shyam Yadav
- Music by: Hamsalekha
- Production company: Rockline Productions
- Distributed by: Rockline Productions
- Release date: 26 January 2001
- Running time: 160 minutes
- Country: India
- Language: Kannada

Diggajaru (transl. The Legends) is a 2001 Indian Kannada-language film directed by D. Rajendra Babu. The film stars Vishnuvardhan in dual roles as a father and son and Ambareesh. The music of the film was composed by Hamsalekha. It is a remake of the 1998 Tamil film Natpukkaga.

== Plot ==
Chikkayya works for an aged landlord called Wodeyar in a village in Mandya. Wodeyar is extremely wealthy and his family is hereditarily respected in their village & surroundings. Chikkayya has great respect and affection towards Wodeyar and he takes care of Chikkayya and looks after him as his own son. Wodeyar hates his eldest daughter Gouraa and her husband for unknown reasons. 15 years earlier, he had ostracised them and gave 50% of his then wealth to Gouraa. Parvati, Wodeyar's younger daughter, arrives at the village after completing her education in the United States. After a series of incidents, Parvati begins to love Chikkayya but he does not reciprocate, thinking that this would be a betrayal to Wodeyar's trust in him. But eventually, Chikkayya too understands Parvati's love and reciprocates.

One day, suddenly, Parvati accuses Chikkayya of trying to rape her. This angers Wodeyar, and he slaps Chikkayya and sends him away from his home. At this time, Chikkayya's father Muthayya is released from jail after 14 years and comes to meet Wodeyar. Muthayya also worked under Wodeyar earlier and was a trusted aide, but Parvati gets angry at seeing Muthayya and asks him to leave the house because he had been jailed for murdering Wodeyar's wife Lakshmi. Parvati also reveals that she staged a drama to send Chikkayya away from her father. Wodeyar is shocked knowing the truth and feels bad that he misunderstood Chikkayya, believing his daughter's deception. Chikkayya deeply hates his father Muthayya since childhood as he believes Muthayya killed Lakshmi for money. He refuses to accept his father into his house and Wodeyar is forced to come to his rescue, and tells Chikkayya the truth, after apologising to Chikkayya for the earlier incident.

Muthayya was a childhood best friend and loyal servant in Wodeyar's home. Wodeyar and his family treat Muthayya as one of their own, despite others disregarding Muthayya due to his lower caste. Lakshmi's younger brother who was then a simple farmer, and his younger brother live with them. Since Wodeyar does not want to send his daughter to a place far off, her wedding is arranged with Lakshmi's brother, with an agreement that he will stay in Wodeyar's house. On the day of the wedding, Lakshmi learns about her brother's affair with another woman and decides to cancel the wedding; Her brother grievously injures Lakshmi, hides her in a room, and proceeds to the wedding stage. However, Muthayya finds Lakshmi and learns the truth about her brother. The wedding is over before he can prevent it, so he does not want him to go to jail as that would impact Gouraa's life. Lakshmi dies from her injuries and Muthayya admits that he had murdered her for money and is arrested by the police. This leads Gouraa and Parvati to hate him and his family. Wodeyar does not believe this, so he meets Muthayya in jail and asks him for the truth. Muthayya tells the truth to Wodeyar and is promised that Wodeyar will not reveal this truth to anyone else as Gouraa would be alone then.

Wodeyar agrees but sends his son in law away from his house. Wodeyar brings the then-12 year old boy Chikkayya to his house to care for him and the entire family protests. His son in law alleges that Chikkayya may be an illegitimate son of Wodeyar, resulting in such deep affection. Deeply angered by these words, Wodeyar banishes his son-in-law. Gouraa also leaves his home without knowing the truth and understanding her father.

The story returns to the present, and the wedding of Parvati's and Gouraa's brother in law is planned. On the wedding day, Gouraa's husband's mistress comes back to him with her brother saying that he wishes to marry his daughter. During this event, the truth about Lakshmi's death is revealed which is witnessed by Gouraa. Her husband tries to kill Gouraa so that the wedding would not stop and they can take all of Wodeyar's properties. But, Muthayya comes to Gouraa's aid and saves her. Gouraa tearfully apologises to him for misunderstanding him as Lakshmi's murderer. Gouraa reveals the truth to everybody during the wedding. Her husband then tries to kill Gouraa with a sword but Muthayya saves her but instead he gets stabbed. Gouraa's husband is killed by his brother with the sword, who felt remorseful after discovering the truth that his elder brother killed their own sister Lakshmi. After learning the truth, Parvati also apologizes to Muthayya who hands over her to Wodeyar and succumbs to his fatal wound. Wodeyar then cries in front of Muthayya's dead body and also dies.

== Cast ==
- Vishnuvardhan in a dual role as:
  - Chikkayya (son)
  - Muthayya (father)
- Ambareesh as Wodeyar
- Sanghavi as Parvati (Chikkammavru)
- Tara as Gouraa
- Umashree as Muttayya's Mother
- Lakshmi as Ammavru
- Tennis Krishna as Amavaase
- Mansoor Ali Khan
- Doddanna
- Sundar Raj as Lekkachaara
- Lakshmi
- Gurudutt
- Reshma

== Production ==
Rajendra Babu and Rockline Venkatesh initially wanted to shoot at Chennai and Karaikudi for which they also scouted locations but none of the locations satisfied them they finally zeroed in Lalitha Palace as the final location.

== Soundtrack ==
The soundtrack was composed by Hamsalekha.

Song	Singer(s)	Duration
"Ela Ivana"	Anuradha Sriram	
"Humba Humba"	S. P. Balasubrahmaniam	
"Komale Komale"	S. P. Balasubrahmaniam, Anuradha Sriram	
"Kuchiku Kuchiku"	S.P. Balasubrahmaniam	5:38
"Nandi Bettana"	S.P. Balasubrahmaniam, Archana Udupa	

== Reception ==
A critic from Chitraloka wrote that "It is a right selection of subject for the audience of Karnataka. What is fantastic firstly is the screenplay of this film. Like any thrillers it holds the attention of audience till the last shot of the film".
