= Vavveru =

Village in Andhra Pradesh, India

- Revenue village
- Interactive map of Vavveru
- Location within Andhra Pradesh
- Coordinates: 14°33′40″N 79°52′24″E
- Country: India
- State: Andhra Pradesh
- District: Nellore
- Mandal: Buchireddypalem

Government
  - Type: Sarpanch

Area
  - Total: 30.14 km^{2} (11.64 sq mi)
- Elevation: 27 m (89 ft)

Population (2011)
  - Total: 33,803
  - Density: 1,122/km^{2} (2,905/sq mi)
- Time zone: UTC+5:30 (IST)
- PIN: 524305

Vavveru is a village in Buchireddypalem Mandal, Nellore District, Andhra Pradesh, India. It is located on the eastern shore of Kanigiri Reservoir, about 13 kilometres northwest of the district seat Nellore and 5 kilometres north of the mandal seat Buchireddypalem. According to the 2011 India Census, the village has a population of 33,803.

== Geography ==
Vavveru is situated at the mouth of Alluru Kaluva as it enters the Kanigiri Reservoir. The village of Mullapudi is located to Vavveru's north, village of Isakapalem to its east, as well as city of Buchireddypalem to its south. Its average elevation is at 27 metres above the sea level.

== Demographics ==
In 2011, Vavveru has 8,903 households with 33,803 residents. Out of the total population, 16,691 are male and 17,112 are female. The literacy rate is at 66.96%, with 12,115 of the male population and 10,518 of the female population being literate. The village's census location code is 591915.
