= Ooh La La La (film) =

2012 Indian film by A. M. Jyothi Krishna

- Theatrical release poster
- Directed by: A. M. Jyothi Krishna
- Screenplay by: A. M. Jyothi Krishna
- Based on: Nachavule by Ravi Babu
- Produced by: G. Sampath; S. Rambabu; D. Kalaiselvam
- Starring: A. M. Jyothi Krishna; Divya Bhandari
- Music by: Shekar Chandra
- Production company: Eka Chakra Media
- Release date: 20 April 2012
- Country: India
- Language: Tamil

Ooh La La La is a 2012 Indian Tamil-language romance film directed by A. M. Jyothi Krishna. A remake of the Telugu film Nachavule (2008), the film stars Jyothi Krishna and newcomer Divya Bhandari. The film was a box office failure.

== Cast ==
- A. M. Jyothi Krishna as Surya
- Divya Bhandari as Preethi
- Thalaivasal Vijay as Surya's father
- Ganja Karuppu
- Rani as Surya's mother
- Saai Sundar as Sathya
- Pattimandram Raja as Preethi's father
- Dhamu

== Production ==
Ooh La La La is the acting debut for Jyothi Krishna. Prithi Bhandari reverted her name back to Divya Bhandari during the production of this film although the film credits still credit her name as Prithi Bhandhari.

== Soundtrack ==
The music was composed by Shekar Chandra. The song "Oh Thozhiye" is based on "Happy Together" by The Turtles. Three songs "Etthae Mukkal", "Unalagai Konda" and "Edhedho Edho Edho", were reused from "Paavu Thakkuva Thommidi", "Manninchava" and "Evevo", from Nachavule, respectively.

Track listing
No.	Title	Lyrics	Singer(s)	Length
1.	"Etthae Mukkal"	Sekar Prasath	Jassie Gift	4:40
2.	"Unalagai Konda"	Yakanth	Shreya Ghoshal	4:16
3.	"Edhedho Edho Edho"	Yakanth	Ranjith	4:16
4.	"Oh Thozhiye"	Tamilamudhan	Ranjith, Chinmayi	4:12
5.	"Vaa Vaa Baby"	Sekar Prasath	SuVi, Sujith	4:58
Total length:				22:22

== Release and reception ==
The release of the film was delayed.

Vivek Ramz of in.com rated the film 2.5/5, saying, "If you love romantic entertainers, then the film's for you. All said and done, Ooh La La La is worth a one time watch". The Times of India wrote that the film, "despite its oft-seen premise, is fun for the most part. To put it in the words of one of its characters, it is immature, silly and harmless". A critic from The New Indian Express wrote that "A passable entertainer, ‘Ooh La La La’ had the potential to turn into an engaging watch. If only the director had presented it with more polish and finesse". Sify called it an "endurance test for its silliness in the first half with some juvenile comedy [...] However, the story moves forward in the second half which is marginally better".
