= Oxygen (2017 film) =

2017 Indian Telugu-language action thriller film

- Theatrical release poster
- Directed by: A. M. Jyothi Krishna
- Screenplay by: A. M. Jyothi Krishna; Sai Shekar
- Story by: A. M. Jyothi Krishna
- Produced by: S. Aishwarya; A. M. Rathnam (presenter)
- Starring: Gopichand; Raashii Khanna; Anu Emmanuel; Jagapathi Babu
- Cinematography: Chota K. Naidu; Vetri Palanisamy
- Edited by: S. B. Uddhav
- Music by: Yuvan Shankar Raja
- Production company: Sri Sai Raam Creations
- Release date: 30 November 2017
- Running time: 157 minutes
- Country: India
- Language: Telugu

Oxygen is a 2017 Indian Telugu-language action thriller film directed by A. M. Jyothi Krishna and produced by S. Aishwarya on Sri Sai Raam Creations banner. The film stars Gopichand, Raashii Khanna and Anu Emmanuel, while Jagapathi Babu, Shaam, Brahmaji, Nagineedu, Abhimanyu Singh, Chandra Mohan play supporting roles. The music was composed by Yuvan Shankar Raja, while the cinematography and editing were handled by Chota K. Naidu-Vetri and S. B. Uddhav. The film marks the final appearance of Chandra Mohan before his death on 11 November 2023.

Oxygen was released theatrically on 30 November 2017 to mixed reviews from critics.

== Plot ==
Raghupati is a village landlord who lives with his brothers Sripathi, Chalapathi, and Ganapathi, along with their family. Raghupati decides to get his daughter Shruti married to an NRI Krishna Prasad for her safety after the murder of his brother Sripathi by two mysterious attackers. Contrary to the family's expectations, Krishna turns out to be a well-cultured man and wins over everyone with his nature. Still, Shruti doesn't want to leave her family after their marriage. Raghupati's nemesis, Veerabhadram, attacks Raghupati and his family members, but Krishna warns Veerabhadram not to target the family again.

Shruti has a change of heart, and she soon accepts the marriage proposal. Shruti pleads with Krishna to leave behind his business and stay in the village, where Krishna happily accepts. The two attackers arrive to kill them, and Shruti's brother Mahendra tries to protect them. However, Krishna decapitates Shruthi's brother, Mahendra, and kills other men with the help of the killers. Krishna also kills Ganapathi and holds Shruthi hostage. Upon being questioned by Shruthi for his deeds, Krishna reveals his identity as Major Sanjeev, and the killers are none other than his colleagues Captain Amit and Sathya.

Past: Sanjeev's brother Ajay commits suicide due to lung cancer caused by chain-smoking, which leads Sanjeev to investigate the matter with the help of his microbiologist girlfriend, Geetha. They find a heavy dose of opium mixed in cigars manufactured by the Tiger Brand. Sanjeev and his higher officers initiate Mission Oxygen and get the brand destroyed. While returning to duty, Sanjeev learns someone was trying to inquire about him and his family. It unveils that Raghupati's brothers are the real owners of the Tiger Brand, where they brutally kill Sanjeev's parents.

To prevent them from knowing about Sanjeev, Geetha leaks the gas cylinder and causes an explosion which kills her. However, the men survived and escaped, which shatters Sanjeev listening to everything on his phone. Amit and Sathya kill Sripathi, who learns that Sanjeev is inquiring about the attackers. Sripathi's death terrifies Raghupathi's family members, and they stop leaving the house. Sanjeev sends details about the marriage to Raghupati via Sripathi's phone and thus comes as Krishna Prasad to kill the family members responsible for destroying his family.

Present: Shruti is convinced and decides to help Sanjeev by retrieving the cigar formula. They recover the black money locked in a safe by Raghupati's brothers and distribute it to the affected parties. Learning from Chalapathi about Sanjeev's devilish shade and Shruti's abduction, Raghupati collapses with a stroke. A CBI officer tries to catch Sanjeev after the money distribution but in vain. Sanjeev and his colleagues break into the factory to retrieve the formula while Shruti uploads the link to a live broadcast of the operation.

A fight leads to Amit, Sathya, and Chalapathi's death, where Sanjeev gets shot by Raghupati, who reveals himself to be the actual creator of the formula and has the formula hidden in his mind through live broadcasts. Everyone learns of Raghupathi's true nature. Sanjeev urges people by saying No Smoking for the last time and then proceeds to jump into the fire along with Raghupati, killing him and blasting the factory. The public is motivated to give up smoking, while the police close the case and declare Sanjeev dead. However, Sanjeev is alive in Bombay after the CBI officer who tried to catch him assures support whenever needed.

== Cast ==
- Gopichand as Major Sanjeev/ Krishna Prasad
- Raashii Khanna as Shruti, Raghupati's daughter
- Anu Emmanuel as Geetha, a microbiologist and Sanjeev's girlfriend
- Jagapathi Babu as Raghupathi, Shruti's father
- Sumithra as Janaki, Shruti's mother
- Shaam as Mahendra, Raghupathi's son
- Abhimanyu Singh as Chalapathi
- Nagineedu as Sripathi
- Brahmaji as Ganapathi
- Ashish Vidyarthi as CBI Officer
- Sayaji Shinde as Veerabhadram
- Milind Gunaji as Major General Chandra Prakash
- Paruchuri Venkateswara Rao as Venkatachalam, Geetha's father
- Chandra Mohan as Sanjeev's father
- Sudha as Sanjeev's mother
- Ali as Savitri
- Vennela Kishore as Aakash
- Amit Tiwari as Captain Amith
- Prabhakar as Captain Satyaveer
- Arjun Das as Ajay
- Sithara as Varalakshmi, Raghupathi's wife
- Raghu Babu as Raghu, Veerabhadram's brother-in-law
- Mounika as Anjala, Sruthi's sister
- Sravan as Sripathi's son
- Jenny as Priest
- Sravani as Parvathi, Sruthi's aunt
- Meghashree as Tulasi, Sruthi's sister
- Mukhtar Khan as Commissioner Sarath Chandra
- Avantika Vandanapu as Avantika
- Raghu Karumanchi as Ramana
- Saikumar Pampana
- Sakshi Chaudhary as a dancer in the song "Adhirindhe"

== Soundtrack ==
Oxygen

Soundtrack album by Yuvan Shankar Raja
- Released: 23 October 2017
- Recorded: 2017
- Genre: Soundtrack
- Length: 18:44
- Label: Aditya Music
- Producer: Yuvan Shankar Raja

Yuvan Shankar Raja chronology
Anbanavan Asaradhavan Adangadhavan (2017)	Oxygen (2017)	Semma Botha Aagathey (2017)

The music was composed by Yuvan Shankar Raja and was released via Aditya Music Company. The audio launch function held on 23 October 2017 at Hyderabad.

Track listing
No.	Title	Lyrics	Singer(s)	Length
1.	"O Kshanam"	Sri Mani	S. Aishwarya, Deepak	5:23
2.	"Adi Lekka"	Ramajogayya Sastry	Revanth	3:51
3.	"Aakaasam"	Ramajogayya Sastry	M. L. R. Karthikeyan, S. Aishwarya	4:00
4.	"Adhirindhe"	Sri Mani	Geetha Madhuri	3:41
5.	"Watch Out For Danger" (Instrumental)		Blaaze	1:57
Total length:				18:44

== Critical reception ==
Oxygen received mixed reviews from critics. Neeshita Nyayapati of The Times of India gave 2/5 stars and wrote "Oxygen is a film with a story and cast that had a lot of potential, if only it was made differently." Manoj Kumar R of The Indian Express gave 2/5 stars and noted that "Except for our common sense, this film can't offend any section of the society." Suresh Kavirayani of Deccan Chronicle gave 2/5 stars and wrote, "Jyothi Krishna's take on the illegal tobacco trade is fresh, but suffers in the narration." Sify wrote, "This Gopichand starrer is like watching two films on a single ticket. Uneven narration is a major issue."
