= Kedi (2006 film) =

2006 Indian film by A. M. Jyothi Krishna

- Poster
- Directed by: A. M. Jyothi Krishna
- Written by: A. M. Jyothi Krishna
- Produced by: A. M. Rathnam
- Starring: Ravi Krishna; Tamannaah Bhatia; Ileana D'Cruz
- Cinematography: A. T. Karun
- Edited by: Kola Bhaskar
- Music by: Yuvan Shankar Raja
- Production company: Sri Surya Movies
- Release date: 24 September 2006
- Running time: 180 minutes
- Country: India
- Language: Tamil

Kedi (/keɪdiː/ transl. Cunning) (Note: The term is derived from the British Raj-era initialism KD which stands for "Known Delinquents" or "Known Depradators".) is a 2006 Indian Tamil-language romantic crime thriller film written and directed by A. M. Jyothi Krishna. It stars Ravi Krishna, Tamannaah Bhatia and Ileana D'Cruz in the lead roles. The film marks the Tamil debuts of Bhatia and D'Cruz, where the former plays a character with negative shades and the latter plays the love interest of Ravi Krishna. Atul Kulkarni, Suman Setty, Ramesh Khanna and M. S. Bhaskar play supporting roles. The film was released on 24 September 2006.

== Plot ==
Raghu is a happy-go-lucky young man who is not serious about studies or life. While in college, he plays pranks on other people. His father dotes on him and so do his close friends. A new girl Priyanka joins his class, who is the sister of Pughazhenthy, a powerful gangster-turned-minister. Priyanka lives a privileged life, and the college gets a facelift as her classroom is fitted with an AC, and the canteen is modernized.

Priyanka even manages to change the principal using her brother's influence, and she dislikes Raghu. Aarthi, a maid's daughter, studies in the same class, and she has a secret admiration towards Raghu. Seeing the way in which Priyanka treats him, Aarthi gives moral support and motivates Raghu to come above Priyanka, who is an all-rounder and best student in the university. This infuriates Priyanka who slowly wants him at any cost. Aarthi is blackmailed by a boy who takes her vulgar photos and he saves her from it. Priyanka decides to separate them, and creates photos with him.

Priyanka finally realises Raghu's love towards Aarthi, and she tries everything possible to separate them but Pughazhenthy wants Raghu to marry his sister. He angers Aarthi by kidnapping and electrifying her, yet she turns normal on seeing Raghu, but worsens when she sees him getting shot. In the end, Aarthi goes mental, which enrages Raghu, who vows revenge on Priyanka. He pretends to accept the marriage and marries Aarthi at the last minute. Raghu discovers that Priyanka even murdered her brother in order to live with Raghu. The film ends with Priyanka killing herself and Raghu burying Aarthi's chain at Priyanka's grave.

== Cast ==
Adapted from the opening and closing credits:

- Ravi Krishna as Raghu
- Tamannaah Bhatia as Priyanka (voiced by Suchitra)
- Ileana D'Cruz as Aarthi (voiced by Savitha Radhakrishnan)
- Atul Kulkarni as Pughazhenthy
- Suman Setty as Raghu's friend
- Ramesh Khanna as shop assistant
- M. S. Bhaskar as Raghu's father
- Sudha as Aarthi's mother
- Adithya Menon as Aadhi, Pughazhenthy's right hand
- Madhan Bob as College Principal Madan Bob
- Chitti Babu as a politician
- Manikiran as College Rowdy
- Hari Kiran as Priyanka's friend
- Srinivasu as Aarthi's friend
- Archana as Aarthi's friend
- Sheela as Aarthi's friend
- Rupa as Aarthi's friend
- Shara as Aarthi's friend

Uncredited

- Venu Yeldandi as Raghu's friend
- Lollu Sabha Easter as suicidal man
- L. B. Sriram as Professor Vinayagam
- Jenny as College Principal

== Production ==
The film, announced in 2005 under the title Kallan (transl. Thief), was later retitled Kedi after protestors alleged the original title was disrespectful to people of the Kallan caste. It was initially planned to be a Tamil-Telugu bilingual, with the Telugu version titled Jadoo. A press meet for the Telugu version took place on 14 May 2006, but eventually, the film was released only in Tamil. It is the Tamil debuts of both Ileana D'Cruz and Tamannaah Bhatia. Bhatia said the director gave her the freedom to choose which role she wanted to play, and she chose the character of Priyanka who she felt was "new" and atypical in mainstream Tamil cinema. This is the first Tamil film for cinematographer A. T. Karun. Even before the completion of the first filming schedule, production was disrupted due to heavy rainfall, resulting in the loss of 70 planned days of shoot. Production resumed after the monsoon season had ended, and by mid-June 2006, 90% of filming was over, having taken place intermittenly in Chennai and Hyderabad.

== Soundtrack ==
The soundtrack was composed by Yuvan Shankar Raja.

Track listing
No.	Title	Lyrics	Singer(s)	Length
1.	"Aadhivasi Naane"	Pa. Vijay	Ranjith, Shreya Ghoshal	3:02
2.	"Kunguma Poove"	Pa. Vijay	Ranjith, Chinmayi Sripada	5:00
3.	"KD Paiya"	Pa. Vijay	Udit Narayan, Shreya Ghoshal	4:43
4.	"Kungumam Kalainthathe"	Pa. Vijay	P. Unnikrishnan	1:20
5.	"College Life Da"	Pa. Vijay	Sabesh	3:42
6.	"Chumma Chumma"	Pa. Vijay	Sunitha Sarathy	4:10
7.	"Antha Vannam Pola"	Kabilan	Karthik, Chinmayi	4:14
8.	"Unna Petha Aatha"	Perarasu	Jassie Gift, Suchitra	4:16
Total length:				30:27

== Critical reception ==
Malini Mannath of Chennai Online wrote "The director shows a marked improvement, and a firmer grip on the medium this time, the narration smoother here. If only he hadn't let himself be confused and lose focus in the second half!" Shyam Balasubramanian of Rediff.com wrote, "The most prominent reasons to watch Kedi are Tamanna and Ileana. See it for them, if for nothing else". Sify praised the performances of Ravi Krishna and Bhatia, but felt the former "has to work more on his dialogue delivery and shed that boyish accent", and the latter "steals the show" while dismissing D'Cruz as a "major let down" due to her inability to emote. The critic concluded that the film "could have been better with some trimming".
