= Sankalpam =

- Poster
- Directed by: A. M. Rathnam
- Written by: Paruchuri Brothers (dialogues)
- Screenplay by: A. M. Rathnam
- Story by: Srinivasan
- Produced by: A. M. Rathnam
- Starring: Jagapathi Babu; Gautami
- Cinematography: Navakanth
- Edited by: Kola Bhaskar
- Music by: Koti
- Production company: Surya Chitra
- Release date: 22 June 1995
- Running time: 138 minutes
- Country: India
- Language: Telugu

Sankalpam (transl. Determination) is a 1995 Indian Telugu-language film produced and directed by A. M. Rathnam. It starred Jagapathi Babu and Gautami in the lead roles, with music composed by Koti. The film featured Prakash Raj in his debut in Telugu. It was a commercial failure at the box office. It is a remake of the 1993 Malayalam film Mithunam.

== Plot ==
The film begins with Krishna Murthy, a youth who aims to establish a biscuit factor, Annapurna, named after his mother. He starts its construction on the government-allotted land for his freedom fighter father, Prakasam / Chinna, and lays the foundation stone. At the outset, he faces hurdles by suborning government officials and struggles with his disobedient family. Parallelly, a cut-throat malefactor, Gaddapalugu Chenchu Ramayah, conducts the land mafia in the city. A check is made to him after setting foot on dynamic municipal commissioner Vyjayanthi. Chenchu Ramayah shot to intimidate her, but she does not concede. Apart from this, Krishna Murthy loves his cousin Rukmini, but her father has no confidence in his success and fixes a different alliance. So, Krishna Murthy enforced the nuptial Rukmini without delay, but she cannot be tailored in her in-law's house and fails to understand her husband's post.

Meanwhile, Chenchu Ramayah imprecates to confiscate Krishna Murthy's factory. He attempts to subjugate Krishna Murthy via affluence and threat but in vain. Hence, Chenchu Ramayah intrigues by forging a fake owner. Unbeknownst to it, Vyjayanti certifies the land as illegal property and notifies Krishna Murthy when a dispute erupts. Soon, Vyjayanti admitted her mistake and barred the demolishing. Krishna Murthy is challenging Chenchu Ramayah to achieve his goal. From there, Chenchu Ramaiah exacerbates Krishna Murthy as he succumbs to him. However, he confronts it with courage, and at every level, Vyjayanti aids him. Spotting it, Rukmini suspects their relationship and questions Vyjayanti. Whereat, she slaps Rukmini and divulges regarding her younger sibling who has committed suicide as deprived by society. Since Krishna Murthy should not undertake the same destiny, she is supporting him. Listening to it, Rukmini discerns her husband's integrity. At last, Chenchu Ramayah seeks to blast the factory, but on time, Krishna Murthy rescues it and ceases him. Finally, the movie ends happily with Vyjayanti's inauguration of the Annapurna Biscuit Factory.

== Cast ==
- Jagapathi Babu as Krishna Murthy
- Gautami as Rukmini
- Prakash Raj as Gaddapalugu Chenchu Ramayah
- Jaya Sudha as Municipal Commissioner Vyjayanthi
- Satyanarayana as Rukmini's father
- Gummadi as Prakasam / Chinna
- Chandra Mohan as Sivaprasad
- Brahmanandam as Jagam
- Sudhakar as Madhu
- Babu Mohan as Guravaiah
- Dharmavarapu Subramanyam as M.R.O.
- AVS as Pollution Officer
- Narra Venkateswara Rao as Municipal Engineer
- Chalapathi Rao as Abbulu
- Rallapalli as Comedy Wizard
- P. L. Narayana as Ranganayakulu
- Gokina Rama Rao as Minister
- Bheemiswara Rao as Chief Secretary
- Brahmaji as Babji
- Sudha as Suseela
- S. Varalakshmi as Mathaji
- Athili Lakshmi as Kantham
- Annuja
- Seeta as Subhadra
- Sunitha
- Padma
- Divya
- Vidya
- Manisha

== Soundtrack ==
Sankalpam

Film score by Koti
- Released: 1995
- Genre: Soundtrack
- Length: 23:55
- Label: Supreme Music
- Producer: Koti

Koti chronology
Rikshavodu (1995)	Sankalpam (1995)	Aayanaki Iddaru (1995)

Music was composed by Koti and it was released on Supreme Music Company.

No.	Title	Lyrics	Singer(s)	Length
1.	"Acchatlo Muchatlo"	Bhuvanachandra	S. P. Balasubrahmanyam, Chitra	4:52
2.	"Chinnaari Manasuku"	Sirivennela Sitarama Sastry	S. P. Balasubrahmanyam, Chitra	4:53
3.	"Dheem Thanakku"	Bhuvanachandra	S. P. Balasubrahmanyam, Chitra	5:09
4.	"Kurisindi Vaana"	Vaddepalli Krishna	S. P. Balasubrahmanyam, SP Pallavi	5:00
5.	"Mettaga Hattuko"	Bhuvanachandra	S. P. Balasubrahmanyam, Chitra	4:01
Total length:				23:55
