= Buchireddypalem =

Buchireddypalem Buchi
- Town
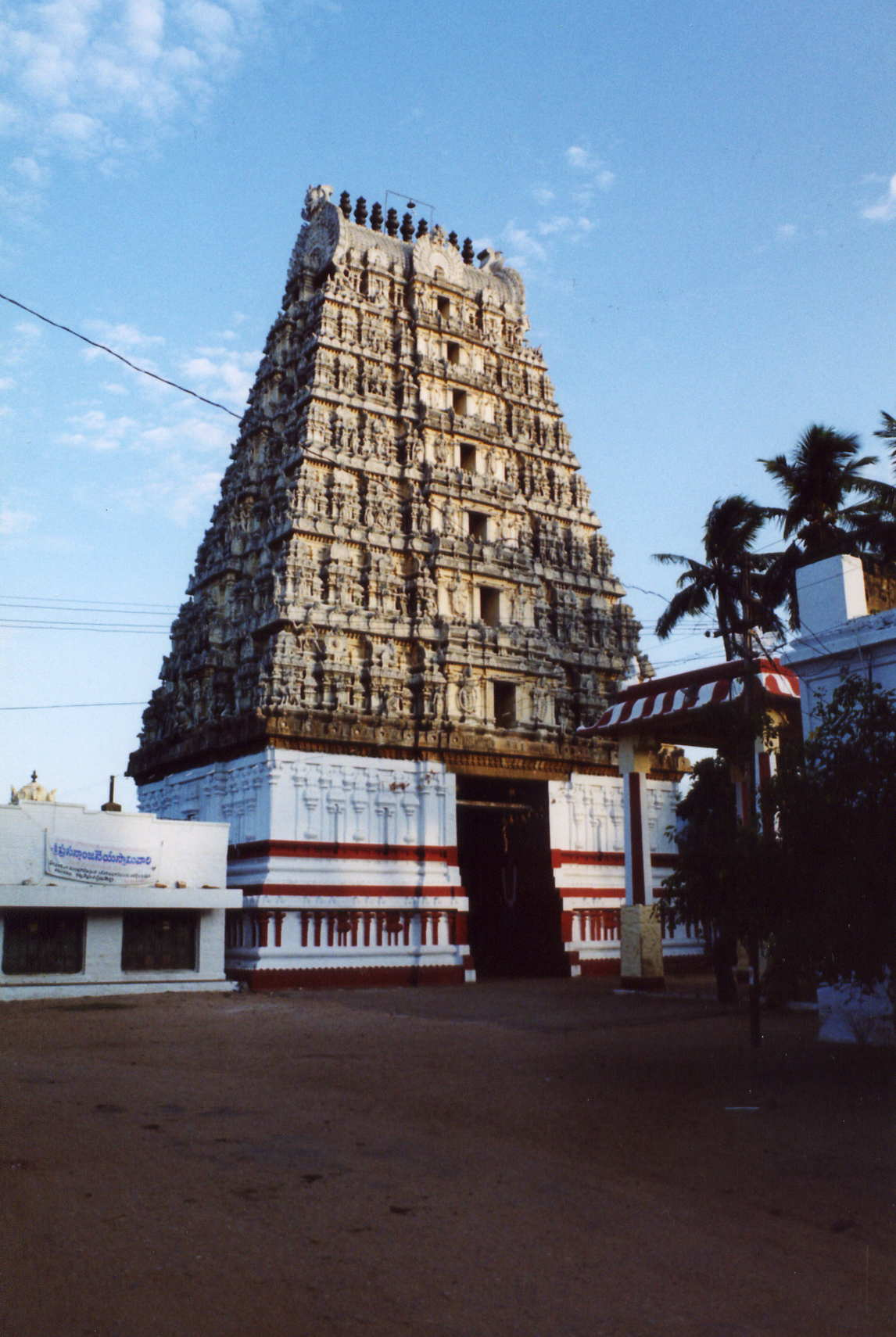
- Sri Kodanda Rama Swamy temple
- Nickname: Buchi
- Location in Andhra Pradesh, India Buchireddypalem (India)
- Coordinates: 14.537394°N 79.881191°E
- Country: India
- State: Andhra Pradesh
- District: Nellore
- Town: Buchireddypalem

Government
  - Type: Municipal Council
  - Body: Buchireddypalem Municipal council[BMC]

Area
  - Total: 30.50 km^{2} (11.78 sq mi)

Population (2011)
  - Total: 38,405
  - Density: 1,259/km^{2} (3,261/sq mi)

Languages
  - Official: Telugu
- Time zone: UTC+5:30 (IST)
- PIN: 524305
- Telephone code: 08622
- Vehicle registration: AP 39

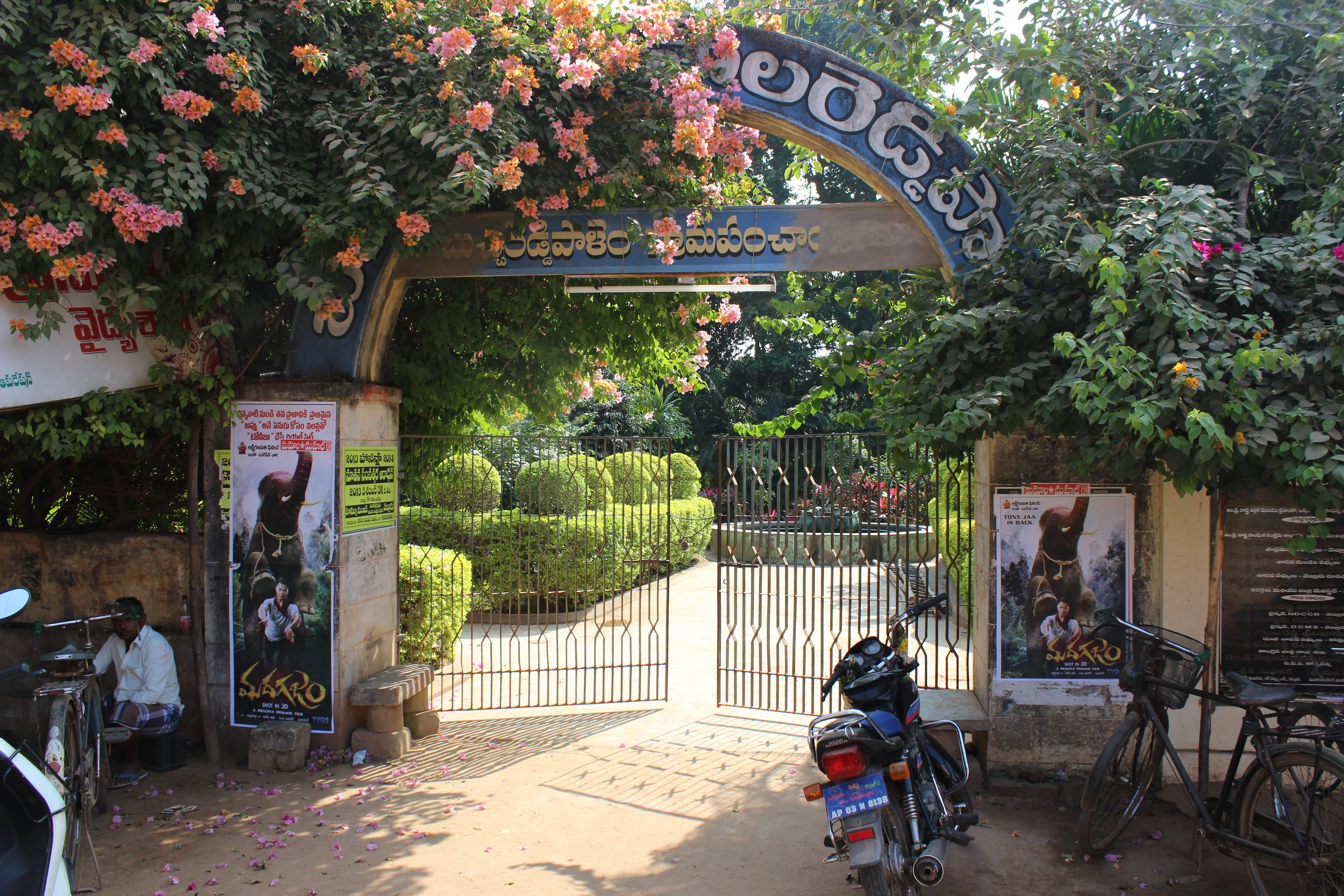
BuchiReddyPalem park

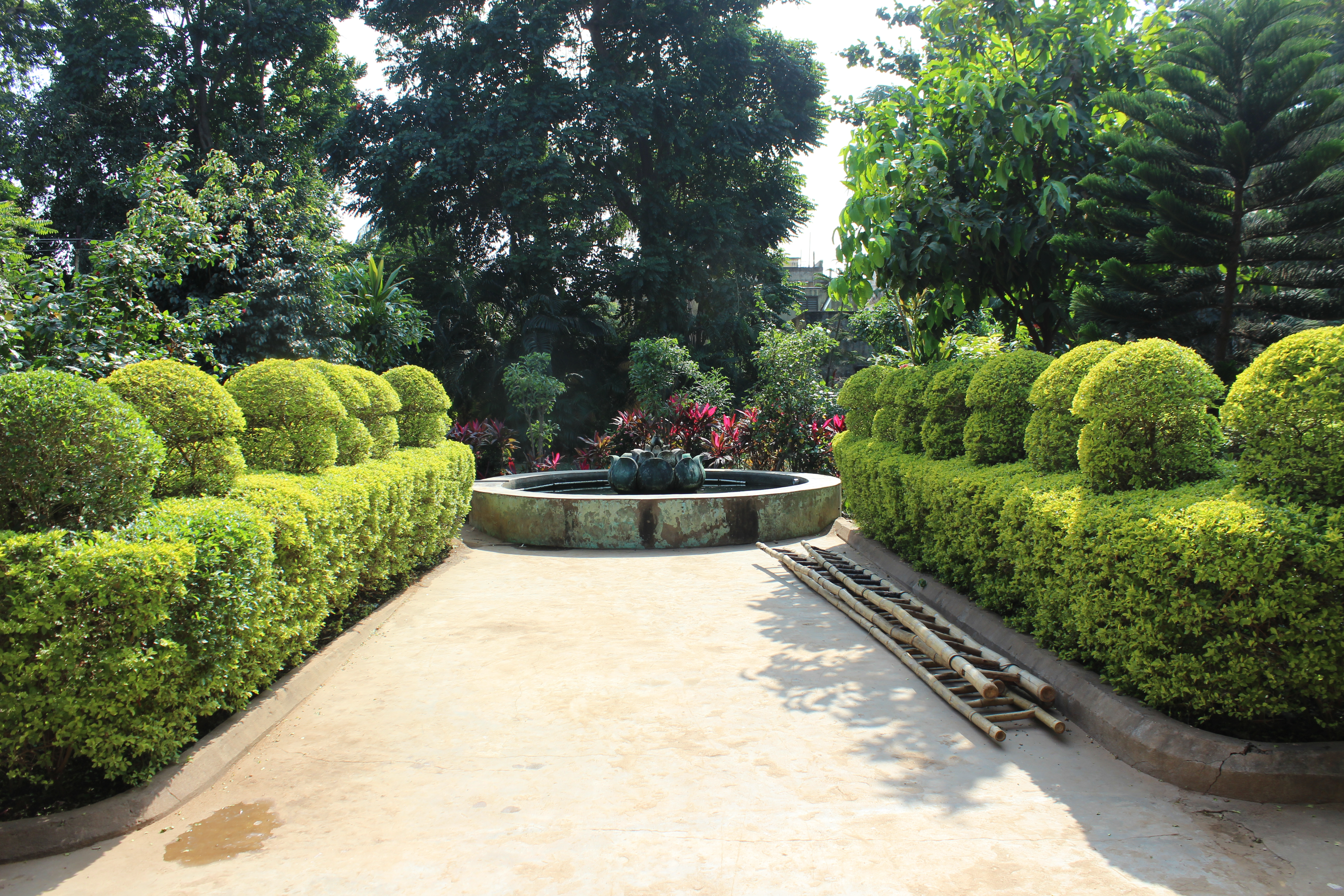
BuchiReddyPalem park

Buchireddypalem is a town in the Nellore district of Andhra Pradesh. It is a municipality located 15km from the Nellore city, and it is a part of the Kovur Assembly constituency. It functions as a municipality within the Buchireddypalem mandal and serves as the administrative headquarters for the mandal. The town plays a key role in local governance and administration, acting as a central hub for surrounding villages and regions within the Nellore district.

== Governance ==
Civic administration

Buchireddypalem is a municipal council. It was established as a nagar panchayat in 2020 and constituted as a Grade 2 municipality in 2025. The town is administered by the Elected Wing of the municipality, consisting of a municipal council, headed by Municipal Chairperson, and the Executive Wing, headed by a municipal commissioner.

== Education ==
Buchireddypalem, located in the Nellore district of Andhra Pradesh (PIN: 524305), is a regional educational hub for students from nearby villages and towns. The town offers a variety of educational institutions, catering to all levels of learning, from early childhood to higher education.

Schools: Buchireddypalem has around many schools, including Anganwadi centers, primary schools, upper primary schools, and high schools. These schools serve both residential and non-residential students, ensuring access to quality education for children in the surrounding areas.

Colleges: The town has multiple institutions of higher learning, including: Junior colleges, Degree college, B.Ed college. Some prominent names are, St. Mary's Degree College, Guthikonda Sreeramulu Degree College, Guthikonda Sreeramulu College of education.

The, Guthikonda Sreeramulu Degree College, Guthikonda Sreeramulu College of education.e institutions make Buchireddypalem an important educational center, attracting students from neighboring regions who seek quality education and professional training.

The primary and secondary school education is imparted by government, aided and private schools, under the School Education Department of the state. The medium of instruction followed by different schools are English, Telugu.

== Transport ==
Roadways

Buchireddypalem is connected to Nellore and other parts of Andhra Pradesh through an extensive road network. National highway 67 passes through Buchireddypalem town which connects Nellore and Mumbai.The Andhra Pradesh State Road Transport Corporation (APSRTC) runs Buses regularly .

Nellore to Buchireddypalem: Buses run frequently (Every 5 to 10 minutes), with a travel time of approximately 30 minutes.

Railways

Though Buchireddypalem itself does not have a railway station, the nearest major railway station is Nellore railway station , which is approximately 20 km away.

Nellore railway Station: Serves as a hub for trains coming from Chennai, Hyderabad, Tirupati, Vijayawada,Bangalore, Vishakapatnam and other parts of India. From Nellore, buses and taxis are available to reach Buchireddypalem .

Airways

The nearest airports to Buchireddypalem are:

Tirupati International Airport (150 km): The closest major airport with domestic flights to cities like Hyderabad, Chennai, and Bangalore.

Chennai International Airport (200 km): The nearest international airport, offering flights to various domestic and international destinations.

Nellore Airport (Proposed): A new airport is under construction near Nellore, which will provide better air connectivity to Buchireddypalem once operational. From these airports, you can reach Buchireddypalem by hiring taxis or taking buses.

Sea ways

the nearest seaport is Krishnapatnam

== Geography ==
Buchireddypalem is located at 14.322967°N 79.525385°E. It has an average elevation of 28 meters (95 feet).

== Etymology ==
In the year 1715 a family man by name Dodla Anna Reddy migrated from the south (present-day Tamil Nadu) to a village called Vavveru since this place was having good water source and fertile land. Later his family established a settlement called Buchireddipalem in the name of their ancestors very close to Vavveru village. Till 1961 census it was known as a hamlet of Vavveru.

== Places of Importance ==
- The Sri Kodanda Rama Swamy temple was built by the Dodla family in 1784 A.D., is also a notable feature of Buchireddipalem. Annual Bramhotsavams are held by Dodla family which are starting from Ram Navami day are a major festivities for this town. Sita Ramula kalyanam on the Chaturdasi day is a major draw among the women devotees who attend in large numbers. Rathotsavam held on the Pournami day attracts huge crowds pulling the Temple Car (Ratham) amidst chants of 'Jai Sriram'in its designated route back to its starting point. Float Festival (Teppotsavam) held on the same day evening is a treat to the eye.
- Kanigiri reservoir one of the biggest man-made reservoirs in the state is located adjacent to the town which is a main source of living for the people around the town.
- The big D.L.N.R High School is located in Buchireddipalem, M. Venkaiah Naidu the former Vice president of India studied in this school, similarly former MP of Nellore Mekapati Rajamohan Reddy is also an old student of this school

== Festivals ==
Sri Kodanda Ramaswamy Brahmothsavam: It is celebrated for eleven days from Chaitra Suddha Navami to Bahula Chaviti (March–April) at Buchireddipalem town in Nellore district. On the Navami day in the morning ‘Dwajarohanam’ is performed and in the evening, the Lord with his consorts is taken on Adi Sesha Vahanam on the main streets of the old town. On Dasami day Lord is made to ride on the Hamsa vahanam with beautiful flower decoration. On Ekadasi day the lord is atop Vyali vahanam in his majestic best. On the Dwadasi day, Lord is carried on his shoulders by his most ardent devotee Hanuman and is a very popular vahanam among certain communities of the town. On the Triyodasi day in the morning, Lord goes around the town in his famous Mohini avatar and in the night Lord is atop Golden Garuda with huge following of the public is taken out of the temple in a takeoff mode. This vahanam is made to go around the entire town and returns to the temple almost at the day break. Seetharamula Kalyanam is celebrated with the full religious fervour with huge attendance from people from all over on the Chaturdasi day and this event is generally more popular among the women folk who throng to get the ‘Talambralu’ (Rice mixed in turmeric and used during the celestial wedding). Seetha Lakshmana sametha Rama is taken to the southern end of the city to shower their blessings on the town folks. Once they return Lord Rama goes on the Gaja vahanam On the pournami day the three deities are put on the elaborately decorated ‘Ratham’ (Temple car) and this ratham is pulled by the thousands of devotees who visit the town from far and near for this event. Normally it takes about 45 minutes for the Ratham to complete its journey and reaches the resting place. During the evening hours, the Lord is taken for a boat ride on a specially built float ‘Theppa’ which is well decorated with lights in the temple tank for three rounds. On completion of the Theppotsavam, Lord goes around the town in Krishna avatar on ‘Ponnamanu seva’. On the Padyami day, Lord goes on his Ashwa vahanam and there is a story of ‘Paruveta’ on triyodasi day chakrasnanam is performed and Dwaja avarohanam is conducted.
