= Ravi Krishna (actor, born 1983) =

Indian actor

- Born: Arani Muni Ravi Krishna; 2 March 1983 (age 43); Nellore, Andhra Pradesh, India
- Occupation: Film actor
- Years active: 2004–2011; 2025—present
- Father: A. M. Rathnam
- Relatives: Jyothi Krishna (brother)

Arani Muni Ravi Krishna (born 2 March 1983) is an Indian actor who works in the Tamil and Telugu films. Son of producer A. M. Rathnam, he made his acting debut in Selvaraghavan's critically acclaimed 7G Rainbow Colony.

== Early life ==
After his schooling, Ravi Krishna went to London where he pursued a BA degree in Multimedia. He completed his diploma in Interactive communication at Pentamedia, while also concentrating on his career in multimedia with non-linear film editing at Sam Media. He disclosed that he never intended to become an actor, but was "roped in" when he visited India for Easter.

== Career ==
Ravi Krishna's debut film 7G Rainbow Colony, directed by Selvaraghavan and produced by his father, fetched him the South Filmfare Award for Best Male Debut, amongst other minor awards. Before starting to shoot for the film, he took a one-month training in acting at the Film Institute in King's College London. Following that, he acted in S. A. Chandrasekhar's Sukran, sharing screen space with Vijay, the Radha Mohan-directed family drama Ponniyin Selvan, and the crime thriller Kedi, under his brother Jyothi Krishna's direction. The films, all produced by his father, did not do good business at the box office. His first Telugu venture, Brahmanandam Drama Company, was also a box office bomb, with Ravi Krishna lamenting that the film failed to succeed due to poor budgeting and publicity. His next release was the bilingual Netru Indru Naalai / Ninna Nedu Repu and in 2009, he starred in Kadhalna Summa Illai, a partial reshoot of the Telugu film Gamyam. He took a long break post the release of Aaranya Kaandam which is often quoted as the first neo-noir film in Tamil cinema. After a near 14-year sabbatical, Ravi Krishna is making a comeback through 7/G Rainbow Colony 2 where he is set to reprise his role from the original.

== Filmography ==
=== As an actor ===
| Year | Title | Role | Language | Notes |
|---|---|---|---|---|
| 2004 | 7G Brindhavan Colony | Ravi | Telugu | Santosham Film Award for Best Debut Actor |
| 2004 | 7G Rainbow Colony | Kadhir | Tamil | Filmfare Award for Best Male Debut – South |
| 2005 | Sukran | Ravi Shankar | Tamil | |
| 2005 | Ponniyin Selvan | Venu | Tamil | Partially reshot in Telugu as Muddula Koduku |
| 2006 | Kedi | Raghu | Tamil | |
| 2008 | Netru Indru Naalai | Vetri | Tamil | Bilingual film |
| 2008 | Ninna Nedu Repu | Vijay | Telugu | Bilingual film |
| 2008 | Brahmanandam Drama Company | Srinu | Telugu | |
| 2009 | Kadhalna Summa Illai | Vettivel | Tamil | Partially reshot version of Gamyam |
| 2011 | Aaranya Kaandam | Sappai | Tamil | |
| 2026 | 7/G Rainbow Colony 2 | Kadhir | Tamil | |

=== Other roles ===
| Year | Title | Role | Language | Notes | Ref. |
|---|---|---|---|---|---|
| 2002 | Run | Graphic designer | Tamil | Title sequence only | |
| 2004 | 7G Rainbow Colony | Graphic designer, costume designer | Tamil | Title sketch only | |
| 2004 | 7G Brindhavan Colony | Graphic designer, costume designer | Telugu | Title sketch only | |
| 2013 | Arrambam | Additional script writer | Tamil | | |
