= Rules Ranjann =

2023 film by Rathinam Krishna

- Theatrical release poster
- Directed by: Rathinam Krishna
- Written by: Rathinam Krishna
- Produced by: Divyang Lavania; Murali Krishnaa Vemuri; A. M. Rathnam (Presenter)
- Starring: Kiran Abbavaram; Neha Shetty
- Cinematography: Dulip Kumar M. S.
- Music by: Amresh Ganesh
- Production company: Starlight Entertainment
- Release date: 6 October 2023
- Country: India
- Language: Telugu

Rules Ranjann is a 2023 Indian Telugu-language romantic comedy film written and directed by Rathinam Krishna. The film stars Kiran Abbavaram and Neha Shetty. It was released on 6 October 2023.

== Plot ==
Manoranjan (Ranjan), a job-seeking graduate from a rural background finds employment in a Mumbai IT office after pressure from his father. Despite being ridiculed for a language barrier, he eventually gains the respect of his co-workers and begins adopting an arbitrary approach to logic and eventually becoming a stringent enforcer of rules, even towards his own boss. Similar absurdities unfold in his apartment complex, when his neighbour, Kamesh, brings multiple girls to his apartment. This prompts Ranjan to try and succeed at getting Kamesh out of the building for breaking his world view. Upon this incident, Ranjan is confronted by Kamesh when Kamesh asks Ranjan if he's ever loved anyone. Ranjan then begins to narrate a story about how he had a crush on a girl in college, but Kamesh proceeds to ridicule him as he never even made a move for her. Coincidentally, Ranjan runs into his crush, Sana, at the train station the very next day and they end up spending the day, and night together. The following day Ranjan drops Sana off at the train station and before Sana leaves, he tries and fails to get her number. The next day, Ranjan tells Kamesh about this miracle and Ranjan decides that he needs to go back to his hometown to try and woo his love. When he goes home, three men who he considers his friends, try to hinder his chances. But through a series of miracles, he proceeds to marry Sana and stick it to his friends while he's at it. While he's at it, he gets Kamesh married to Sana's friend.

== Cast ==
- Kiran Abbavaram as Manoranjan "Ranjan"
- Neha Shetty as Sana
- Meher Chahal as Swapna
- Vennela Kishore as Kamesh
- Subbaraju as Sana's brother
- Hyper Aadhi as Ranjan's friend
- Harsha Chemudu as Ranjan's friend
- Annu Kapoor
- Ajay as Swapna's brother
- Nagineedu
- Atul Parchure as Ranjan's coworker
- Vijay Patkar as Tukaram
- Makarand Deshpande
- Sudharshan as Ranjan's friend
- Goparaju Ramana as Ranjan's father
- Abhimanyu Singh
- Siddharth Sen
- Gulshan Pandey

== Music ==
All music is composed by Amresh Ganesh.

Track listing
No.	Title	Lyrics	Singer(s)	Length
1.	"Naalo Nene Lenu"	Rambabu Gosala	Sarath Santhosh	3:14
2.	"Sammohanuda"	Rathinam Krishna, Rambabu Gosala	Shreya Ghoshal	3:22
3.	"Enduku Ra Babu"	Krishna Kanth	Rahul Sipligunj, L. V. Revanth	3:18
4.	"Dhekho Mumbai"	Kasarla Shyam, Megh-Uh-Watt	Adnan Sami, Payal Dev	4:20
5.	"Emaindhira Mama"	Megh-Uh-Watt	Kunal Ganjawala, Megh-Uh-Watt, Ab	3:34

== Release and reception ==
Rules Ranjann was initially scheduled to be released on 28 September 2023 but was later postponed and released on 6 October 2023.

Subhash K. Jha for Times Now called it a "chaotic comedy that starts with office absurdities, loses focus in a misogynistic subplot, and relies too heavily on weak dialogues, leaving viewers with a mindless and aimless experience". Naresh Kota of NTV rated the film 2.25 out of 5 and opined that the screenplay and story were too bad, with over-the-top bad performances being the major negative factor. Telugucinema.com wrote, "Such non-serious films work only when the comedy portions are hilarious. But the comedy track involving Vennela Kishore in the first half is distasteful. In the second half, the comedic parts starring Hyper Adhi, Harsh, and Sudarshanam are equally inane".
