= Natpukkaga =

- DVD cover
- Directed by: K. S. Ravikumar
- Screenplay by: K. S. Ravikumar
- Story by: A. M. Jyothi Krishna
- Produced by: A. M. Rathnam
- Starring: R. Sarathkumar; Vijayakumar; Simran; Sujatha
- Cinematography: Ashok Rajan
- Edited by: K. Thanikachalam
- Music by: Deva
- Production company: Sri Surya Movies
- Release date: 25 June 1998
- Running time: 162 minutes
- Country: India
- Language: Tamil

Natpukkaga (transl. For Friendship) is a 1998 Indian Tamil-language drama film directed by K. S. Ravikumar, starring R. Sarathkumar in dual roles as a father and son, Simran, Vijayakumar and Sujatha. The film won two Filmfare Awards South and Tamil Nadu State Film Awards, both ceremonies conferring Best Film and Best Actor (Sarathkumar). It was remade in Telugu by Ravikumar as Sneham Kosam (1999) and in Kannada as Diggajaru (2001).

== Plot ==
Chinnayya works for an aged landlord named Karunakaran aka Ayya in a village in Coimbatore district. Chinnayya has great respect and affection towards Karunakaran and he takes care of Chinnayya and looks after him as his own son. Karunakaran is extremely wealthy and his family is hereditarily respected in their village & surroundings. Karunakaran hates his eldest daughter Gowri and her husband Perusu for unknown reasons. 15 years earlier, he had ostracised them and gave a large share of his then wealth to Gowri. Prabhavathy, Karunakaran's younger daughter, arrives at the village after completing her education in the United States. After a series of incidents, Prabhavathy begins to love Chinnayya but he does not reciprocate, thinking that this would be a betrayal to Karunakaran's trust in him. But eventually, Chinnayya too understands Prabhavathy's love and reciprocates.

One day, suddenly, Prabhavathy accuses Chinnayya of trying to rape her. This angers Karunakaran, and he slaps Chinnayya and sends him away from his home. At this time, Chinnayya's father Muthaiya is released from jail after 14 years and comes to meet Karunakaran. Muthaiya also worked under Karunakaran earlier and was a trusted aide, but Prabhavathy gets angry at seeing Muthaiya and asks him to leave the house because he had been jailed for murdering Karunakaran's wife Lakshmi. Prabhavathy also reveals that she staged a drama to send Chinnayya away from her father. Karunakaran is shocked knowing the truth and feels bad that he misunderstood Chinnayya, believing his daughter's deception. Chinnayya deeply hates his father Muthaiya since childhood as he believes Muthaiaya killed Lakshmi for money. He refuses to accept his father into his house and Karunakaran is forced to come to his rescue, and tells Chinnayya the truth, after apologising to Chinnayya for the earlier incident.

Muthaiya was a childhood friend and loyal servant in Karunakaran's home. Karunakaran and his family treat Muthaiya as one of their own, despite others disregarding Muthaiya due to his lower caste. Perusu is Lakshmi's younger brother who was then a simple farmer, and he has a younger brother, Chinnaraasu . Since Karunakaran does not want to send his daughter to a place far off, her wedding is arranged with Perusu, with an agreement that Perusu will stay in Gowri's home. On the day of the wedding, Lakshmi learns about Perusu's affair with another woman and decides to cancel the wedding; Perusu grievously injures Lakshmi, hides her in a room, and proceeds to the wedding stage. However, Muthaiya finds Lakshmi and learns the truth about Perusu. The wedding is over before he can prevent it, so he does not want Perusu to go to jail as that would impact Gowri's life. Lakshmi dies from her injuries and Muthaiya admits that he had murdered her for money and is arrested by the police. This leads Gowri and Prabhavathy to hate him and his family. Karunakaran does not believe this, so he meets Muthaiya in jail and asks him for the truth. Muthaiya tells the truth to Karunakaran and is promised that Karunakaran will not reveal this truth to anyone else as Gowri would be alone then.

Karunakaran agrees but sends Perusu away from his house. Karunakaran brings the then-12 year old boy Chinnayya to his house to care for him and the entire family protests. Perusu alleges that Chinnayya may be an illegitimate son of Karunakaran, resulting in such deep affection. Deeply angered by these words, Karunakaran banishes his son-in-law. Gowri also leaves his home without knowing the truth and understanding her father.

The story returns to the present, and the wedding of Prabhavathy's and Perusu's brother Chinnarasu is planned. On the wedding day, Perusu's mistress comes back with her brother saying that he wishes to marry Perusu's daughter. During this event, the truth about Lakshmi's death is revealed which is witnessed by Gowri. Perusu tries to kill Gowri so that the wedding would not stop and they can take all of Karunakaran's properties. But, Muthaiya comes to Gowri's aid and saves her. Gowri tearfully apologises to him for misunderstanding him as Lakshmi's murderer. Gowri reveals the truth to everybody during the wedding. Perusu then tries to kill Gowri with a sword but Muthaiya saves her but instead he gets stabbed. Perusu is killed by Chinnaraasu with the sword, who felt remorseful after discovering the truth that Perusu killed their own sister Lakshmi. After learning the truth, Prabavathy also apologizes to Muthaiya who hands over her to Karunakaran and succumbs to his fatal wound. Before dying, Muthaiya tells Chinnaya to take care of Karunakaran. Karunakaran then cries in front of Muthaiya's dead body and also dies. The movie ends with the marriage of Chinnayya and Prabhavathy.

== Cast ==
- R. Sarathkumar in a dual role as:
  - Chinnayya
    - Mahendran as young Chinnayya
  - Muthaiyya
- Simran as Prabhavathi
  - Hemalatha as young Prabhavathi
- Vijayakumar as Karunakaran "Periyayya"
- Sithara as Gowri, Periyayya's daughter
- R. Sundarrajan as Kanakku "Kanakku" pillai
- Senthil as Kunnan, a temporary laborer
- Mansoor Ali Khan as Gajapathy "Perusu", Gowri's husband
- Ranjith as Pasupathy "Sirusu", Perusu's younger brother
- Manobala as Madurai
- Anu Mohan as Anu, car driver
- Manorama as Muthaiya's mother and Chinnayya's grandmother
- Sujatha as Lakshmi, Periyayya's wife
- Idichapuli Selvaraj as Selvaraj
- Kavithalaya Krishnan as an auto driver (guest role)
- Anitha as Kamakshi
- Sridevi as Selvi, Perusu and Gowri's daughter
- Pallavi as Perusu's Mistress
- Crane Manohar as a farmer
- Kovai Senthil as Iyer
- K. S. Ravikumar as a limping priest (guest role)

== Production ==
The story of Natpukkaga was written by the then 17-year old A. M. Jyothi Krishna, son of producer A. M. Rathnam. The initial choice for Vijayakumar's role was Sivaji Ganesan who left the film for unknown reasons. Director K. S. Ravikumar initially approached Mammootty to play the lead role. For reasons unknown, he declined the offer. Sarathkumar was then chosen to play the lead. The team had initially considered Soundarya, Meena and then Keerthi Reddy to play the leading female role; their unavailability led to Simran being cast. The song "Garuda Garuda" was shot at Bangkok.

== Soundtrack ==
The soundtrack was composed by Deva. Lyrics were by Kavignar Kalidasan. Sarathkumar and Vijayakumar made their singing debut with this film, performing "Namma Ayya Nallvarungo".

Songs	Singers
"Namma Ayya Nallvarungo"	Mano, Malaysia Vasudevan, Sarathkumar, Vijayakumar
"Adikkira Kai Anaikkuma"	Harini
"Chinna Chinna Mundhiriya"	Mano, K. S. Chithra
"Garuda Garuda"	Krishnaraj, Sujatha
"Meesaikkaara Nanbaa"	Deva
"Meesakkaara Nanbaa" (Sad)	Krishnaraj

== Critical reception ==
Film critic D. S. Ramanujam wrote the film has been "delectably structured" and that "Sarath Kumar portrays both the roles with maturity". Ji of Kalki praised the performances of the main cast and Senthil's comedy, and concluded that the film could be watched for its vivacity. K. Vijiyan of New Straits Times wrote that though the story was familiar, "Ravikumar keeps it interesting by letting us guess until the end what caused the split in the family". Screen wrote, "Director K.S Ravikumar and Sarath Kumar effectively combine once again to deliver a film that is loaded with sentiments designed to pull your heart strings. Sarath Kumar in the dual role of father and son finely delineates the various shades of his dual characters and adds yet another feather to his cap".

== Accolades ==
Event	Award	Recipient(s)	Ref.
46th Filmfare Awards South	Best Film – Tamil	Natpukkaga	
46th Filmfare Awards South	Best Actor – Tamil	R. Sarathkumar	
Tamil Nadu State Film Awards	Best Film	Natpukkaga	
Tamil Nadu State Film Awards	Best Actor	R. Sarathkumar	

== Remakes ==
Natpukkaga was remade by Ravikumar in Telugu as Sneham Kosam (1999) and in Kannada as Diggajaru (2000).
