= Sukran =

- Theatrical release poster
- Directed by: S. A. Chandrasekharan
- Written by: S. A. Chandrasekharan; B. Balamurugan (dialogues)
- Produced by: S. A. Chandrasekharan
- Starring: Ravi Krishna; Anita Hassanandani
- Cinematography: S. Soundararajan
- Edited by: Suresh Urs
- Music by: Songs: Vijay Antony; Score: Pravin Mani
- Production company: J. S. Films
- Distributed by: Sri Surya Movies
- Release date: 18 February 2005
- Running time: 144 minutes
- Country: India
- Language: Tamil

Sukran is a 2005 Indian Tamil-language action thriller film written, produced and directed by S. A. Chandrasekharan. The film stars Vijay in an extended cameo as the title character, with Ravi Krishna and Anita Hassanandani as the lead pair. The music was composed by debutant Vijay Antony with the score composed by Pravin Mani.

== Plot ==
Ravi Shankar and Sandhya, students of a college in Dindigul, are in love, but Sandhya faces a problem at home as her uncle is attracted to her. One day, he peeps into her bathroom while she bathes, and she complains about it to her malevolent stepmother, but she doesn't take it into consideration and tells Sandhya that they will get married one day anyway. Sandhya tells her stepmother that she's in love with Ravi, telling her that she will marry only Ravi.

When Sandhya's stepmother discovers their affair, she pokes her nose in their wheel. Ravi's father, who is very caring and loving, sends them to Chennai. After they reach Chennai, he checks in on them, and in the middle of the phone call, he is killed by Sandhya's stepmother. After that, a corrupt police officer named Mahesh falsely accuses Ravi of murdering his own father and apprehends Ravi on a complaint given by Sandhya's stepmother that he had murdered his own father when he put his foot down on their affair. Ravi is then put behind bars.

Sandhya is persuaded to seek the help of a judge named Needhi Manikkam to get a bail for Ravi. Manikkam, being an incorrect person, blackmails her into sleeping with him, causing her to spit on his face. Sandhya is taken to a palace by the police, where she gets gang-raped by Mahesh, Manikkam, and Tamil Kumaran (Bobby Bedi), the son of Minister Janardhanan. In the meantime, an honest police officer releases Ravi, so that he can save Sandhya. While Ravi is heading to her destination, the trio removes her clothes, bind her to the bed, and rape her by turns, which they also take a video clip of. Ravi tries to enter the palace to save her but only to be stopped and severely beaten up by Needhi Manikkam's henchmen and getting thrown into the gallows and eventually becomes unconscious. After some time, Sandhya also becomes unconscious.

After a series of events, Sandhya decides to commit suicide, because she says that she has undergone a lot of pain and anguish, and the pain is so terrible that she cannot forget it until she dies. Ravi, unwilling to lose her by death and be separated from her since he had already lost both of his parents, chooses to die along with her so that they are still together after life. At this juncture, a criminal lawyer named Sukran arrives to the beach to save them, teaches them the value of life and advises them to face all the troubles boldly. After that, he tells them to start a new life and to be happy and successful by the time they meet again. They get jobs and money, marry, move into a small house, and have a normal life. One day, when Sandhya is in her nightdress, Mahesh, Manikkam, and Kumaran force her again, causing the couple to get harassed by the police. The incident causes Sandhya to be arrested on false charges of prostitution. All efforts by Ravi to get her out on bail are futile. An agitated Ravi supposedly shoots Mahesh, Manikkam, Kumaran, and Sandhya's stepmother dead and escapes with Sandhya from the court.

Once more, Sukran steps in and promises to save the couple. He appears on Ravi's behalf and puts forward enough evidence to help him out. Following this, Sukran orders the court to sentence Minister Janardhanan to death in the most humiliating way possible, by hanging him completely naked in broad daylight in Madras Marina Beach in front of lakhs of public, and then have his corpse posthumously exposed to the elements, vultures, and decay, due to all the wrongdoings he had committed and his previous disputes with him, in order to ensure complete justice. However, the judge objects by saying that even wrongdoers should be spared and due to the court's limits. Disappointed by the court's failure to comply with Sukran's order, Sukran takes the law into his own hands by killing Janardhanan, much to the court's shock. After that, Sukran surrenders to the police, stating that even though Janardhanan was a degenerate, he should not have done the murder in front of the judge.

== Cast ==
- Vijay as Sukran, a criminal lawyer (extended cameo)
- Ravi Krishna as Ravi Shankar
- Anita Hassanandani as Sandhya
- FEFSI Vijayan as Minister Janardhanan
- Rajan P. Dev as Judge Needhi Manikkam
- Sriman as ACP Mahesh
- Bobby Bedi as Tamil Kumaran, Janardhanan's son
- Nassar as Ravi's father
- Nalini as Sandhya's stepmother
- Seetha as Judge Manimekalai
- Santhana Bharathi as Judge
- Ajay Rathnam as Public Proscecutor Ramanujam
- M. S. Bhaskar as a Police Constable
- Chitra Lakshmanan as Manimekalai's assistant
- E. Ramdoss as Police officer
- Pasi Sathya as a woman helping Ravi and Sandhya
- John Amrithraj
- Balu Anand
- Bava Lakshmanan
- Rambha (special appearance in the song "Saathikkadi Pothikkadi")
- Ragasya (special appearance in the song "Thulluvadho Ilamai")
- Vijayakumar as himself (Guest appearance)
- Mahanadi Shankar as Janardhanan's henchman (uncredited role)
- S. A. Chandrasekhar as himself in the shooting of Sachein and voice-over as a police officer talking to Sukran (Dual role, guest appearance)
- Ashok Raja (special appearance in the song "Panju Methai")

== Production ==
Filming started in October 2004, and was completed by January 2005. Initially, Vijay was not interested in making an extended cameo as the title character, but accepted after showing interest in the story. A song featuring Rambha choreographed by Ashok Raja was shot on a dhaba set at AVM Studios. Vijay enacted a lawyer once again in this movie, after his role as a lawyer for the first time in the 2002 action drama movie Thamizhan.

== Soundtrack ==
The soundtrack was composed by Vijay Antony, in his feature film debut. The audio rights were acquired by Five Star Audio and Ayngaran.

Song	Singers	Lyrics
"Panju Methai"	Shoba Chandrasekhar, Vijay Antony	Vaigai Selvan
"Saathikadi" I	Vijay Antony, Sangeetha Rajeshwaran	Snehan
"Saathikadi" II	Vijay Antony, Sangeetha Rajeshwaran, Uma Mahesh	Snehan
"Sukran" Theme Music	Jaidev, Anoop, Vijay Antony	Vijay Antony
"Suppose Unnai"	Ranjith, Vinaya	Vijay Antony
"Thullavatho Ilamai"	Malgudi Subha	Vaali
"Un Paarvai"	Sangeetha Rajeshwaran, Tippu	Vijay Antony
"Uchi Mudhal"	Timmy, Gayathri	Vijay Antony
"Vaanamthan" I	Manikka Vinayagam	Kabilan
"Vaanamthan" II	Jaidev, Manikka Vinayagam	Kabilan

== Release ==
Sukran was released worldwide on 18 February 2005. Prior to its release, the film was awarded an "A" (adults only) certificate by the Censor Board with 22 cuts, while the UAE censors objected to the film's content and asked for deletion of footage amounting to 32 minutes. But the filmmakers refused to do it, resulting in the film being banned there.

== Critical reception ==
Malathi Rangarajan of The Hindu wrote, "Producer, writer and director S. A. Chandrasekaran returns after a hiatus, youthful in imagination and agile in execution — at times too much so [..] Chandrasekaran's yen for courtroom drama, make Sukran a cocktail of sorts." Malini Mannath of Chennai Online wrote that "The first half does move at a fast pace, making one think that the director was on to a love story with a difference" and added that "Sukran not only takes care of the matter but also hogs the whole show, to the detriment of the script, totally sidelining Ravi and Sandhya who had put up such a good show till then!" G. Ulaganathan of Deccan Herald wrote, "S A Chandrashekar (father of superstar Vijay), the man known for his movies that highlight corruption in the judiciary, makes a comeback with Sukran. Though the film has a romantic subject, the message comes loud and clear. Liberally mixed with commercial elements, Sukran has some hard-hitting dialogues against the judiciary, police and academicians".
