= Enakku 20 Unakku 18 =

Enakku 20 Unakku 18 Nee Manasu Naaku Telusu
- DVD of Tamil version
- Directed by: A. M. Jyothi Krishna
- Written by: A. M. Jyothi Krishna
- Produced by: A. M. Rathnam
- Starring: Tarun; Trisha; Shriya
- Cinematography: R. Ganesh
- Edited by: Kola Bhaskar
- Music by: A. R. Rahman
- Production company: Sri Surya Movies
- Release date: 19 December 2003
- Running time: 158 minutes
- Country: India
- Languages: Tamil; Telugu

Enakku 20 Unakku 18 (transl. I Am 20, You Are 18) is a 2003 Indian romantic comedy sports film written and directed by A. M. Jyothi Krishna. The film stars Tarun, Trisha, and Shriya. It was filmed simultaneously in Tamil and Telugu; the latter titled Nee Manasu Naaku Telusu (transl. I Know Your Heart) with Sunil and Tanikella Bharani, replacing Vivek and Manivannan, respectively. The film's score and soundtrack were composed by A. R. Rahman. This film marks the Telugu debut of Trisha and the Tamil debut of Shriya. The film had an average run at the box office. The soundtrack of the film gained popularity among the youth audience.

== Plot ==
Sridhar is a final-year management student who gets selected for postgraduate studies in the United States. He travels to Mumbai for an interview and, on his return journey by train, meets Preeti and falls in love with her. Sridhar learns that Preeti is about to enter the second year of her undergraduate degree, while Preeti learns that he is a final-year management student. Sridhar is an ardent cricket fan, so is Preeti, while Sridhar is also a good football player. Unfortunately, both leave without revealing any details. Preeti is moving to town, as her brother Kumar is an IPS officer who has been transferred from Bombay on special deputation. Preeti's family move to the house on the street adjacent to Sridhar's. Sridhar's elder brother-in-law was a Government civil engineer, who has been in prison on false corruption charges, for a collapsed bridge.

The college principal appoints Reshma as a student-cum-coach for Sridhar’s football team. While Sridhar and Preeti search for each other at different colleges, Preeti unknowingly helps Sridhar’s mother during a heart attack. They finally spot each other at LB Stadium, but before they can reunite, a bomb blast injures Sridhar and separates them again.

Later Preeti's parents convince her to agree for a marriage and tell her to forget about the boy she was searching. At the same time, Sridhar's mother also tells him to concentrate on studies and go abroad to complete his studies. At this juncture, Sridhar learns that Preeti was staying just behind his house, when her parents come to his house to inform that she is getting married. Sridhar's gang participates in an inter-college football match and wins the cup. Sridhar's mother suffers yet another heart attack and Preeti's father admits her in the hospital. Then they come to know that Sridhar's brother-in-law was behind bars for no fault of his. Preeti learns about Sridhar's brother-in-law and asks her brother to help. Kumar and his men raid the godowns of the contractor involved, and find waste quality materials in his stock. This saves Sridhar's brother-in-law and he is released. Meanwhile, Sridhar's mother passes away. Later Sridhar's brother-in-law is posted to another city and he leaves with his wife and son. Sridhar feels lonely so, he decides to emigrate. He departs suddenly without informing his friends. Meanwhile Preethi while travelling to Mumbai for her wedding meets with an accident by falling off the train. Her parents cancel the wedding.

Three years later, Sridhar and Preeti unexpectedly meet on the same train. Preeti is traveling with her newborn nephew (whom Sridhar initially mistakes to be Preeti's baby), while Sridhar is returning home with his friend Priyanka (whom Preeti initially mistakes to be his wife), who reveals her intention to marry him. When she reveals the truth about the baby, Sridhar gets excited and gets off the train to bring flowers and propose to Preeti. He misses the train even after being severely injured trying to catch the running train. But, He finds Preeti waiting for him holding the same kind of flowers he tried to bring. They confess their love and reunite as a couple.

== Cast ==
Cast (Tamil)	Cast (Telugu)	Role (Tamil)	Role (Telugu)
Tarun		Sridhar	Sridhar
Trisha (voice: Savitha)		Preethi	Preethi
Shriya		Reshma	Reshma
Vivek	Sunil	Kabali (Kapil)	Kapali (Kapil)
Manivannan	Tanikella Bharani	Preeti's father	Preeti's father
Riyaz Khan		Kumar, Preeti's brother	Kumar, Preeti's brother
Archana Puran Singh		Preethi's mother	Preethi's mother
Devadarshini		Girija, Sridhar's sister	Girija, Sridhar's sister
Kalairani		Gayathri, Sridhar's mother	Gayathri, Sridhar's mother
Suvarna Mathew		Preeti's sister-in-law	Preeti's sister-in-law
Babloo		Babloo	Babloo
Sasi	Siva Reddy	Chimpu	Chimpu
Sweety		Sweety	Sweety
Saathappan Nandakumar		College principal	College principal
Surya		Police inspector	Police inspector
Jenny		Bomb informer	Bomb informer
Cell Murugan	Unknown	Traffic Inspector	Traffic Inspector
Shehnaz	—	Kapil's friend	—
Minnal Deepa		College student (uncredited role)	College student (uncredited role)
Bharathi		College student (uncredited role)	College student (uncredited role)
Preethi Varma		College student (uncredited role)	College student (uncredited role)
Saranya Nag		College student (uncredited role)	College student (uncredited role)
Lollu Sabha Soundarya		College student (uncredited role)	College student (uncredited role)
Reema Sen		Priyanka (guest appearance)	Priyanka (guest appearance)
Anand		Anand, Sridhar's brother-in-law (guest appearance)	Anand, Sridhar's brother-in-law (guest appearance)
Janaki Sabesh		Train Passengers (guest appearance)	Train Passengers (guest appearance)
R. Sundarrajan	Chandra Mohan	Train Passengers (guest appearance)	Train Passengers (guest appearance)
Vaiyapuri	Bandla Ganesh	Train Passengers (guest appearance)	Train Passengers (guest appearance)
Mano		Himself (cameo appearance)	Himself (cameo appearance)

== Production ==
Trisha had signed the film before any of her other films had released in 2001. The film was launched with a clap on 20 January 2002. For one song, 260 shots were taken and picturised at 90 locations in Chennai and Hyderabad. One song "Yedho Yedho" ("Yedo Yedo" in Telugu) was picturised in Venice, the Colosseum in Rome and St. Peter's Basilica in Vatican City.

== Soundtrack ==
Enakku 20 Unakku 18 / Nee Manasu Naaku Telusu

Soundtrack album by A. R. Rahman
- Released: 17 October 2003
- Recorded: Panchathan Record Inn
- Genre: Film soundtrack
- Labels: Five Star Audio; Ayngaran Music; Aditya Music
- Producer: A.R. Rahman

A. R. Rahman chronology
Warriors of Heaven and Earth (2003)	Enakku 20 Unakku 18 / Nee Manasu Naaku Telusu (2003)	Kangalal Kaidhu Sei (2003)

The soundtrack was composed by A. R. Rahman. Lyrics were written by Pa. Vijay for the Tamil version. The same set of vocalists were used for both versions, except for two songs. S. P. B. Charan and Venkat Prabhu were replaced by Mano and Unnikrishnan in the Telugu version of the song "Oru Nanban Irundhal". Srinivas was replaced by Sriram Parthasarathy in the Telugu version of the song "Asathura".

Tamil Soundtrack

The soundtrack features 6 songs composed by A. R. Rahman. Lyrics were written by Pa. Vijay.

Song	Artist(s)	Length
"Azhaginna Azhagi"	Surjo Bhattacharya, Shreya Ghoshal	5:23
"Sandhippoma"	Unni Menon, Chinmayi, Annupamaa	5:32
"Kama Kama"	Annupamaa, Aparna, Kunal Ganjawala, Blaaze, George Peter	4:37
"Oru Nanban Irundhal"	S. P. B. Charan, Venkat Prabhu, Chinmayi	4:19
"Yedho Yedho"	Karthik, Gopika Poornima	5:43
"Asathura"	Srinivas, Chitra Sivaraman, Mathangi, George Peter	5:04

Telugu Soundtrack

Song	Artist(s)	Length
"Andani Andam Askava"	Surjo Bhattacharya, Shreya Ghoshal	5:23
"Kalusukundama"	Unni Menon, Chinmayi, Annupamaa	5:32
"Kama Kama"	Anupama, Aparna, Kunal Ganjawala, Blaaze, George Peter	4:37
"Snehitude Unte"	Mano, Unnikrishnan, Chinmayi	4:19
"Yedo Yedo"	Karthik, Gopika Poornima	5:43
"Masthura Masthura"	Sriram Parthasarathy, Chitra Sivaraman, Mathangi, George Peter	5:04

== Critical reception ==
=== Tamil version ===
Malathi Rangarajan from The Hindu wrote that "certain scenes have appreciable depth while some are downright superficial and predictable", and that the film was "absorbing in parts, spontaneous in spurts, natural at times and clichéd now and then". Karthiga Rukmanykanthan of the Sri Lankan newspaper Daily News labelled it as "strictly for youth" and a "perfect choice". Malini Mannath of Chennai Online wrote, "The first half is colourful and lively, the takings slick, and stylish, though there’s a sense of Déjà vu throughout. But in the second half the script meanders, loses focus, is disjointed, straying to the mother – sister sentiment".

=== Telugu version ===
Jeevi of Idlebrain.com wrote that "This film is titled as 'Nee Manasu Naaku Telusu'. But contrary to it, the lovers fail to read what is there in the other heart's when they meet each other for second time". A critic from Sify wrote that "The campus scenes in the first half are lewd with double meaning dialogues which are sure to make the family audience squirm in their seats. A.R Rahman’s peppy music has not been utilised by the director who has simply copied Shankar’s picturisation (Jeans, Boys). On the whole Jothi Krishna has to learn the basics of filmmaking before he attempts his second film!"
