= Hari Hara Veera Mallu =

2025 Indian film by Krish Jagarlamudi

- Theatrical release poster
- Directed by: A. M. Jyothi Krishna; Krish Jagarlamudi
- Written by: A. M. Jyothi Krishna; Krish Jagarlamudi
- Dialogues by: Sai Madhav Burra
- Produced by: A. Dayakar Rao; A. M. Rathnam
- Starring: Pawan Kalyan; Nidhhi Agerwal; Bobby Deol
- Cinematography: Manoj Paramahamsa; Gnana Shekar V. S.
- Edited by: Praveen K. L.
- Music by: M. M. Keeravani
- Production company: Mega Surya Production
- Distributed by: see below
- Release date: 24 July 2025
- Running time: 161 minutes
- Country: India
- Language: Telugu
- Budget: ₹250–300 crore
- Box office: ₹113.85 crore

Hari Hara Veera Mallu: Part 1 is a 2025 Indian Telugu-language historical action-adventure film written and directed by A. M. Jyothi Krishna alongside Krish Jagarlamudi. The film stars Pawan Kalyan in the titular role, alongside Nidhhi Agerwal and Bobby Deol in prominent roles. Sathyaraj, Easwari Rao, Sunil, Nassar, Subbaraju, Ayyappa P. Sharma, Kabir Duhan Singh, Raghu Babu, Nihar Kapoor and others feature in supporting roles. It is set in the 17th century Mughal Empire and follows Veera Mallu, a celebrated warrior who is given the mission to recover the Koh-i-Noor to rescue a city from Mughal soldiers.

The film was officially announced in January 2020 with principal photography commencing in September 2020. The film, predominantly shot in Hyderabad, experienced several delays due to the COVID-19 pandemic and Kalyan's political commitments, concluding only in May 2025. Initial portions of the film were directed by Jagarlamudi, while the latter portions were helmed by Krishna under the former's supervision. The dialogues were written by Sai Madhav Burra and the music was composed by M. M. Keeravani.

Hari Hara Veera Mallu was released on 24 July 2025 in standard and EPIQ formats, and opened to negative reviews. While the action sequences and performances were praised, the visual effects and tonal inconsistencies received widespread criticism. The film became a box office disaster.

== Plot ==
The story of Hari Hara Veera Mallu is set in 17th-century Mughal India, a period of immense political upheaval and power struggles. The film centers on the titular character, Hari Hara Veera Mallu (played by Pawan Kalyan), a legendary heroic warrior with a knack for robbing from the rich to help the poor—a true Robin Hood figure.

Veera Mallu's path crosses with a formidable gang leader known as Dora. Initially, their relationship is one of rivals, but they eventually form an unlikely alliance to steal a priceless collection of diamonds.

Meanwhile, the Mughal Empire is in a state of chaos. The ruthless prince Aurangzeb will stop at nothing to secure the throne. He orchestrates the murder of his own brother to eliminate a rival for power and publicly executes three other key figures by beheading them, sending a clear message of his tyrannical authority.

Back in his own world, Veera Mallu falls in love with Panchami, a beautiful and cunning woman. However, their romance is short-lived. After successfully acquiring the diamonds, Panchami betrays Veera Mallu, steals the gems, and leaves him for dead.

Veera Mallu is captured and brought before Qutb Shah, the Sultan of Golconda. Shah, recognising Veera Mallu's immense skills, offers him a chance at redemption: retrieve the legendary Koh-i-Noor diamond from the clutches of the tyrannical Aurangzeb.

Veera Mallu embarks on this dangerous mission with a small group of allies. As they journey toward Aurangzeb's court, one of his companions reveals a crucial piece of information to the rest of the group: Veera Mallu's true intention is not just to steal the diamond, but to confront and defeat Aurangzeb himself, fulfilling a much larger destiny. The film builds to a dramatic climax where Veera Mallu and Aurangzeb engage in a brutal, final confrontation, just as a powerful tornado descends upon them. The battle concludes with Veera Mallu hanging on tight to Aurangzeb as they are both caught in the storm hinting at a violent confrontation.

== Cast ==
- Pawan Kalyan as Veera Mallu
- Nidhhi Agerwal as Panchami
- Bobby Deol as Aurangzeb
- Sathyaraj as Sivananda
- Easwari Rao as Kousalya
- Sunil as Subbanna
- Nassar as Vissanna
- Vikramjeet Virk as Mirza Khan
- Subbaraju as Abbanna
- Ayyappa P. Sharma as Abdullah
- Kabir Duhan Singh as Gulfam Khan
- Raghu Babu as Munimanikhyam
- Nihar Kapoor as Balchi Pathan
- Kota Srinivasa Rao as Peddha Dora
- Makarand Deshpande as Meera
- Benedict Garrett as Alphonse
- Kabir Bedi as Shahjahan
- Sachin Khedekar as Chinna Dora
- Chatrapathi Sekhar as Dasanna
- Salim Baig as Hakim Khan
- Pammi Sai as Chinna Poojari
- Ravi Prakash
- Redin Kingsley
- Adithya Menon as Nawab Commander
- Anasuya Bharadwaj as Vanaja
- Pujita Ponnada as Jalaja
- Himaja as Vishala
- Anil George as Moulan
- Aashit Chatterjee as Wazir
- Bobby Bedi as Osman Khan
- Govind Namdev as Guru
- Rajiv Kachroo as Dara Sikkoh
- Dalip Tahil as Abul Hasan Qutb Shah
- Subbaraya Sarma as Madanna
- Mir Sarwar as Jatt King
- Tanikella Bharani as Shiva
- Murali Sharma as Kasi Lingam
- Anudeep K. V.
- Vennela Kishore

== Production ==
=== Development ===
In September 2019, producer A. M. Rathnam approached Pawan Kalyan, who had semi-retired from films to pursue a career in politics, to star in a film directed by Krish Jagarlamudi. Later in November that year, Jagarlamudi narrated Kalyan the script of a period film in which he would play a thief. Kalyan accepted the film in principle and underwent a look test in January 2020. The film was launched in the same month in Hyderabad at Rathnam's office. It was tentatively titled PSPK 27, intended to be Kalyan's 27th film as a lead actor.

In September 2020, Jagarlamudi officially confirmed through his Twitter account that a period film has been in production, marking the first collaboration between Jagarlamudi and Kalyan. The film is set in 17th century with the backdrop of Mughals and Qutb Shahis. Several titles including Virupaksha, Hara Hara Mahadeva and Hari Hara Veeramallu were considered. In March 2021, the film's title is confirmed as Hari Hara Veera Mallu.

Initially marketed as a single film, in May 2024, the production house announced that the film would be released in two parts, with the first part titled as Hari Hara Veera Mallu: Part 1. The remaining portions of the film and post-production were handled by A. M. Rathnam's son, A. M. Jyothi Krishna, due to the highly delayed production owing to the pandemic, Kalyan's political commitments, and Krish's directorial commitments.

The film is produced under Rathnam's production banner Mega Surya Production. The film's score and soundtrack are composed by M. M. Keeravani. Gnana Shekar V. S. is signed as the cinematographer. Sai Madhav Burra is signed to write the film's dialogues. Ben Lock, who has supervised the graphic work in films like Aquaman, Warcraft, Star Wars: The Force Awakens is in charge of the VFX of this film.

=== Casting ===
The film was set to mark the Telugu debut of Hindi film actor Arjun Rampal, who was supposed to play the role of the Mughal emperor Aurangzeb. However, he was replaced by Bobby Deol as Rampal dropped out of the film due to other commitments and production delays owing to the COVID-19 pandemic. Deol joined the production in December 2022.

Actress Nidhhi Agerwal is cast in the role of Panchami, opposite Kalyan. In March 2021, Jacqueline Fernandez was signed to play a crucial role in the film. However, she opted out of the project due to scheduling conflicts and she was replaced by Nargis Fakhri in December 2021. Fakhri plays the Mughal empress Roshanara, Aurangzeb's sister.

=== Filming ===
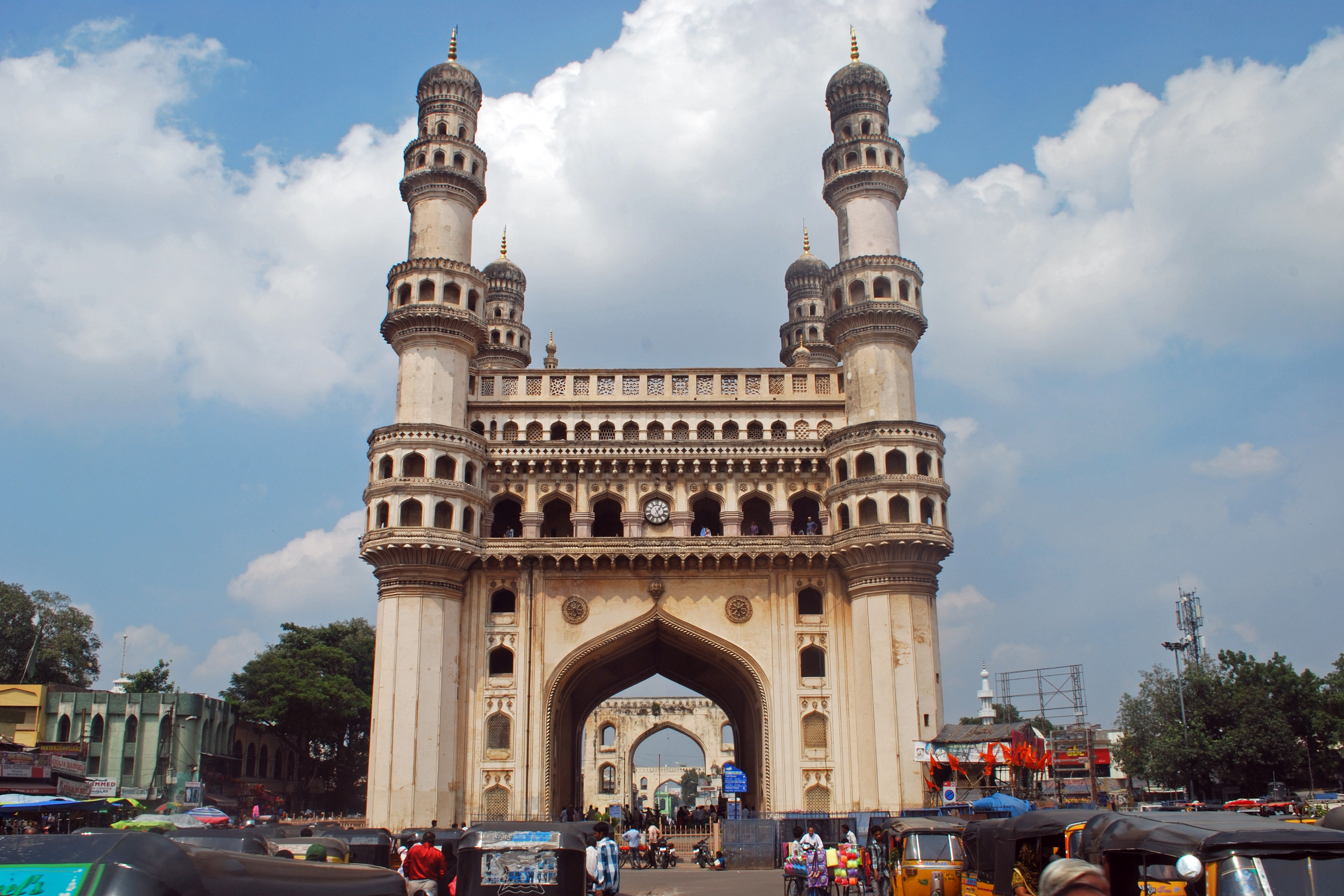
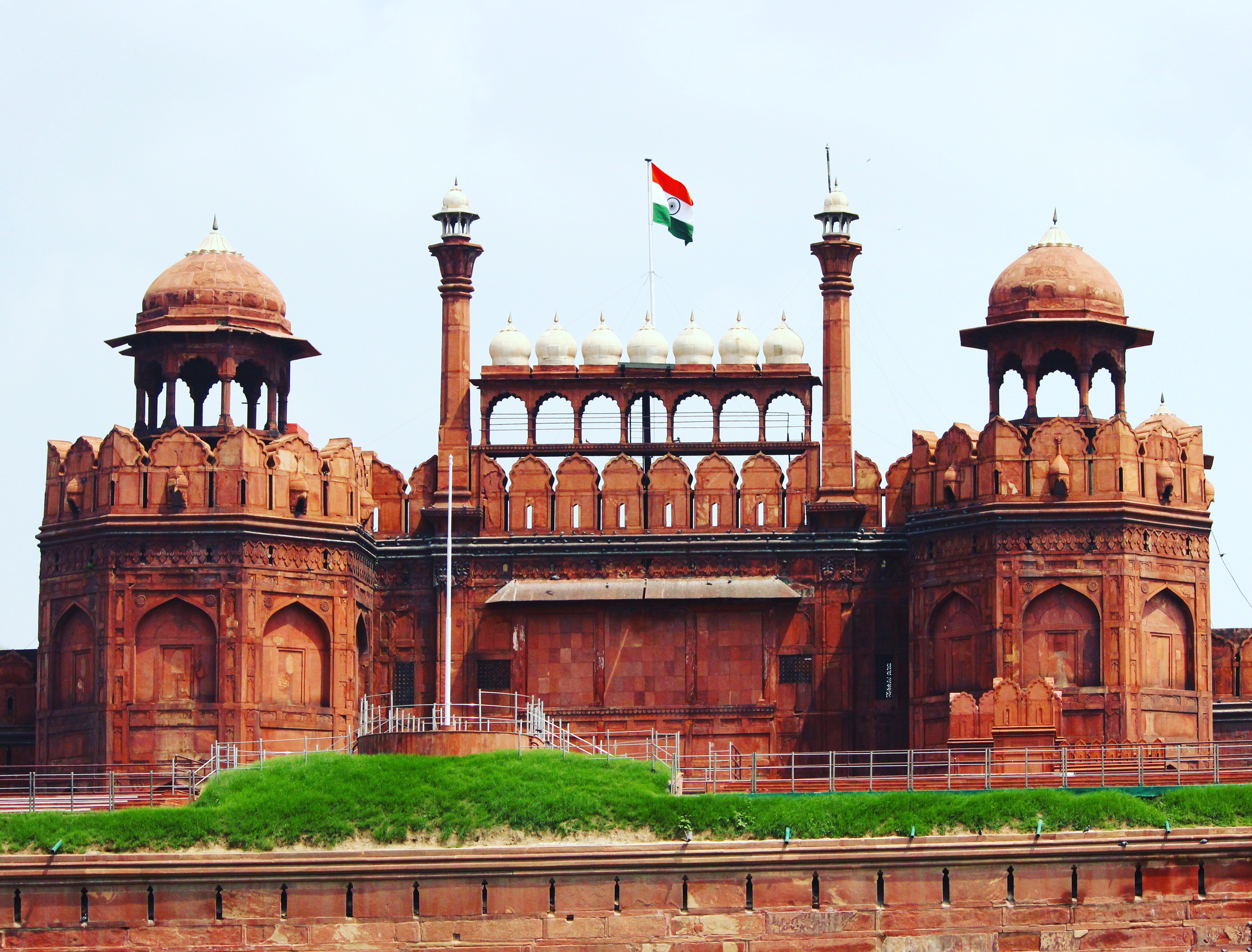
Historical monuments such as Charminar (left) and Red Fort (right) have been recreated for the film

In September 2020, Jagarlamudi completed a 15-day shooting schedule with Kalyan before it was halted due to the COVID-19 pandemic. The shooting resumed in January 2021 in Hyderabad. Rampal joined the production in February 2021. The production set up sets that mirrored the historical monuments of Charminar, Red Fort, and Machilipatnam Port for the film. The shoot was suspended again in April 2021 due to the COVID-19 pandemic.

Shooting of the film experienced delays due to Kalyan's other film commitments, namely, Bheemla Nayak. In December 2021, art director Rajeevan was replaced by Anand Sai, who began working on the film's sets. A new schedule where a major part of the film would be shot, was expected to begin in January 2022, but was delayed. Filming resumed in April 2022 with Kalyan joining the production. Nearly 60 per cent of the shoot was completed by September 2022.

Filming resumed in the last week of October 2022. A large set was erected at Ramoji Film City for this purpose, with a crew of over 900 people. However the shooting was subsequently delayed due to Kalyan's political commitments and 2024 Andhra Pradesh Legislative Assembly election.

Following his success campaign in 2024 election, Kalyan resumed filming in September 2024 in a set built in Vijayawada. The last schedule of the shoot was commenced on 30 November 2024 in Vijayawada. In April 2025, reports indicated that key scenes for Hari Hara Veera Mallu: Part 2 were filmed during an outdoor schedule in Mumbai. Although official confirmation was pending, social media posts from costume designers suggested the completion of this schedule. This led to speculation regarding the release timeline of Part 1, which is reportedly in its final post-production stages including dubbing and VFX work. The entire filming was wrapped up by May 2025, almost 5 years later.

=== Post production ===
On 29 May 2025, Kalyan wrapped up the entire dubbing of his part in four hours. Ben Lock served as the visual effects supervisor of the film.

== Music ==
Hari Hara Veera Mallu: Part 1

Soundtrack album by M. M. Keeravani
- Released: 2024–2025
- Recorded: 2025
- Studio: Annapurna Studios
- Genre: Soundtrack
- Length: 24:30
- Label: Tips

The music of the film was composed by M. M. Keeravani in his fifth collaboration with Krish Jagarlamudi after Vedam (2010), NTR: Kathanayakudu (2019), NTR: Mahanayakudu (2019), and Konda Polam (2021); first collaboration with Pawan Kalyan. The audio rights of the film were purchased by Tips.

The first single titled "Maata Vinaali" was released on 17 January 2025. The second single titled "Kollagottinadhiro" was released on 24 February 2025. The third single titled "Asura Hananam" was released on 21 May 2025. The fourth single titled "Taara Taara" was released on 28 May 2025.

No.	Title	Lyrics	Singer(s)	Length
1.	"Maata Vinaali"	Penchal Das	Pawan Kalyan, Hymath Mohammed, Lokeshwar Edara, Maman Kumar	2:30
2.	"Kollagottinadhiro"	Chandrabose	Rahul Sipligunj, Mangli, Ramya Behara, Yamini Ghantasala	4:29
3.	"Asura Hananam"	Rambabu Gosala	Airaa Udupi, Kaala Bhairava, Sai Charan Bhaskaruni, Lokeshwar Edara, Hymath Mohammed	4:06
4.	"Taara Taara"	Sri Harsha Emani	Lipsika Bhashyam, Aditya Iyengar	3:57
5.	"Evaradi Evaradi"	Ramajogayya Sastry	Sai Charan Bhaskaruni, Hymath Mohammed, Lokeshwar Edara, P V N S Rohit	1:35
6.	"Puli, Meka - Game"	Chandrabose	Harika Narayan	2:58
7.	"Salasala Marige"	Chaitanya Prasad	Sai Charan Bhaskaruni, Lokeshwar Edara, Hymath Mohammed, P V N S Rohit, Lipsika Bhashyam, Harini Ivaturi, Nayana Nair, Harika Narayan, Gomathi Iyer	4:55
Total length:				24:30

== Marketing ==
The first-look poster of Hari Hara Veera Mallu: Part 1 was unveiled on 10 April 2022 to coincide with the celebration of Rama Navami, showcasing Pawan Kalyan in a fierce warrior avatar and generating considerable buzz on social media.

On 2 May 2024, a teaser titled Sword vs Spirit was released, highlighting the grand scale, period production design, and a powerful score composed by M. M. Keeravani. In May 2025, the makers confirmed the film's theatrical release date as 12 June 2025. In June 2025, it was reported that Pawan Kalyan had returned ₹11 crore of his remuneration to support the film's completion and would lead promotional activities in person. The film's trailer was released on 3 July 2025, the film's trailer features voice overs by Arjun Das in Telugu, Tamil and Hindi.

== Release ==
=== Theatrical ===
Hari Hara Veera Mallu was initially slated for worldwide release on 14 January 2022 coinciding with Sankranti. However, in September 2021, the release date was pushed to 29 April 2022. It was again postponed due to delays by the pandemic and Kalyan's political commitments. It was further delayed again as Kalyan remained unavailable due to his political commitments. The film was later scheduled for release on 28 March 2025 but was postponed as many portions of the shoot were incomplete.

The film was scheduled to release on 9 May 2025, but was postponed again. It was later scheduled to release on 12 June 2025. The production team issued another update, clarifying that some post-production work regarding the visual effects and color grading was still pending, resulting in another postponement. Finally, after multiple delays the film was released worldwide on 24 July 2025 in standard and EPIQ formats. It was released in original Telugu alongside dubbed versions of Hindi, Tamil, Kannada and Malayalam languages.

After the film received criticism upon release for the VFX, it was updated with an edited version removing multiple scenes including 10–15 minutes of footage from the climax.

=== Distribution ===
The film's distribution rights in Nizam and Kerala were acquired by Mythri Movie Makers and Dulquer Salmaan's Wayfarer Films respectively. The Tamil Nadu distribution rights of the film were acquired by Shakthi Film Factory. The North India distribution rights of the film acquired by AA Films.

=== Home media ===
The post-theatrical streaming rights of the film were acquired by Amazon Prime Video and was released on 20 August 2025. However, this version was trimmed by 10 minutes and featured a new ending, which drew criticism from viewers as it had been altered for the third time since the theatrical release.

== Reception ==
Jaya Dwivedie from India TV gave the film 3 stars out of 5, praising the action sequences and feeling that Pawan Kalyan's performance was the film's strongest aspect and M. M. Keeravani's music was the soul, but felt that Bobby Deol's Aurangzeb was a stereotypical villain and the VFX, while impressive in most scenes, was weak at times, affecting the immersion. Sangeetha Devi Dundoo from The Hindu praised the action sequences and music, but criticised the VFX and writing, remarking that a second part would need far sharper writing and more assured filmmaking.

Neeshita Nyayapati from Hindustan Times gave the film 2.5 stars out of 5, feeling that while the film had potential to be a fun story about a street smart outlaw, the VFX and writing were a massive letdown. Similarly, Paul Nicodemus from The Times of India gave the film 2.5 stars out of 5, and was critical of the VFX and storytelling, while praising the background score, production design and costumes. T Maruthi Acharya of India Today gave the movie 2 out of 5 stars and wrote "'Hari Hara Veera Mallu: Part 1' is a film full of ideas, ambition, and star power, but its execution doesn’t quite rise to match them".

Swarup Kodur of The Indian Express gave the movie 1.5 out of 5 stars and commented "Hari Hara Veera Mallu lets off the opportunity to create a fascinating folk hero for our times, and ends up being a misguided revisionist project". Sruthi Ganapathy Raman of The Hollywood Reporter India gave an overall poor review and wrote "What starts off as an occasionally amusing drama about a 17th century Robinhood type getting ready for a heist, goes into deeply problematic territory very soon". Ganesh Aaglave of Firstpost gave the movie 2 out of 5 stars and wrote "Hari Hara Veera Mallu: Part 1 has interesting sub-plots and sub-texts exploring Pawan Kalyan's character's hidden motives, but it is a half-baked and dragged screenplay, which has marred the movie".

The Telegraph Online gave the movie negative reviews and wrote "‘Disappointing’: Pawan Kalyan’s comeback film ‘Hari Hara Veera Mallu’ gets a thumbs down". As per Arshdeep Kaur of Livemint, gave the movie a mediocre rating and wrote "The much-anticipated period action drama Hari Hara Veera Mallu, starring Pawan Kalyan, failed to impress netizens, who largely deemed it mediocre. However, Nidhhi Agerwal emerged as the silver lining, earning praise for her “outstanding performance” in the lead female role".

== See also ==
  - Pawan Kalyan filmography
  - They Call Him OG
  - Ustaad Bhagat Singh
