= Netru Indru Naalai (2008 film) =

Film by Lakshmikant Chenna

Netru Indru Naalai; Ninna Nedu Repu
- Theatrical poster in Tamil
- Directed by: Lakshmikanth Chenna
- Written by: Prasanna Kumar (Tamil dialogues)
- Screenplay by: Lakshmikanth Chenna
- Story by: Lakshmikanth Chenna
- Produced by: Nukarapu Surya Prakash Rao
- Starring: Ravi Krishna; Akshara
- Cinematography: Vincent
- Edited by: Lokesh
- Music by: Anil
- Production company: SPR Entertainments (india) Pvt.Ltd.
- Release date: 9 October 2008
- Country: India
- Languages: Tamil; Telugu

Netru Indru Naalai (transl. Yesterday, Today, Tomorrow) is a 2008 Indian Tamil-language film written and directed by Lakshmikanth Chenna. The film stars Ravi Krishna and Rekha Vedavyas (credited as Akshara) with Tamannaah Bhatia in a guest appearance. The film was simultaneously made in Telugu as Ninna Nedu Repu. The music was composed by Anil, and the film released on 9 October 2008.

== Plot ==
A dejected youth Vetri (Vijay in Telugu) decides to end his life on a railway track. On the tracks, he sees the dead body of a youth called Kishore and takes away his mobile phone. The call he attends over the phone brings him fortune. He gets richer, and money starts coming to him from all quarters. On other hand, a new girl named Swapna, who knew Kishore but never met him, also enters Vetri's life. Fate takes a different turn. A baddie in the city, Poorana, calls up and threatens Vetri. How he manages to put together the pieces of his new life and escape from the deadly goons forms rest of the story.

== Cast ==
- Ravi Krishna as Vetri / Vijay
- Tamannaah Bhatia as Aasha (cameo appearance)
- Akshara as Swapna
- Soumya Bollapragada as Neelu
- Ajay as Poorana
- Nassar as Dharmanna
- Karunas as Thamizh (Tamil)
- Venu Madhav as Pandu (Telugu)
- Dinesh as Kishore
- Apoorva as Vetri / Vijay's mother
- Malladi Raghava as Vetri / Vijay's father
- Vizag Prasad as Swapna's father
- Brahmanandam as Vetri / Vijay's houseowner
- Jayavani as the wife of Vetri / Vijay's houseowner
- Lakshmipati as Kishore's houseowner
- Uttej as Vamsi Krishna
- Madhunandan as Vetri / Vijay's friend

== Music ==
The music was composed by Anil R. and released by Aditya Music.

Tamil tracklist

- "Kase" – Ranjith, Nithin
- "Netru Indru" – Deepu
- "Oru Naalo" – Ranjith
- "Aasai" – Priya, Sayonara
- "Ethetho" – Gowtham

Telugu tracklist

No.	Title	Lyrics	Singer(s)	Length
1.	"Ninna Nedu Repu"	Krishna Chaitanya	Deepu	2:37
2.	"Vayasey Theliyani"	Krishna Chaitanya	Ranjith, Nithin	4:32
3.	"Oohallo"	Veturi	Gautham Bharadwaj, Harshika	1:47
4.	"Thadi Vedi"	Veturi	Ranjith, Harshika	4:35
5.	"Jil Jil Javani"	Veturi	Sayonara, Priya Himesh	3:43
6.	"Theme"		Instrumental	2:14
Total length:				19:28

== Release and reception ==
The film was ready for release in February 2008 but was delayed. The Times of India wrote "In this age of networking and MMS, it's a bit hard to swallow that the boy and girl had not swapped pictures. A couple of minuses like that, however, doesn't stop the film from being moderately entertaining". Sify wrote, "The movie has a message in the end, but the manner it is conveyed makes for interesting viewing. A definite change from the usual mindless violence or mushy love stories of recent times".
