= Ponniyin Selvan (2005 film) =

2005 film by Radha Mohan

- DVD cover
- Directed by: Radha Mohan
- Written by: Viji (dialogues)
- Screenplay by: Radha Mohan
- Story by: Radha Mohan
- Produced by: A. M. Rathnam
- Starring: Ravi Krishna; Gopika; Revathi; Prakash Raj
- Cinematography: Srinivas
- Edited by: Mu. Kasi Vishwanathan
- Music by: Vidyasagar
- Distributed by: Sri Surya Movies
- Release date: 15 August 2005
- Country: India
- Language: Tamil

Ponniyin Selvan (transl. The son of Ponni) is a 2005 Indian Tamil-language drama film written and directed by Radha Mohan. Produced by A. M. Rathnam, it stars his son Ravi Krishna, along with Gopika and Revathi, while Vidyasagar composed the music for the film. The film is unrelated to the same-titled novel by Kalki Krishnamurthy. It was released in Telugu as Muddula Koduku and additionally featured Uttej and Venu Madhav replacing the Tamil actors Elango Kumaravel and Mayilsamy, respectively.

== Plot ==
Venu is a middle-class young man who lives in a middle-class area. His life revolves around his mother, sister, neighbor and friends. He has an inferiority complex because of the scar on his face. One fateful day, Venu decides to have plastic surgery to remove the scar. In order to raise money for his operation, he takes up part-time jobs. He becomes harsh and cold and starts to behave strangely with his family and friends. This new Venu shocks everyone around him. The rest of the story is about what he realizes in the process of getting his new face job.

== Cast ==
- Ravi Krishna as Venu
- Gopika as Kani
- Prakash Raj as Guru
- Revathi as Ponni
- Sanjeeda Sheikh as Priya
- Thalaivasal Vijay as Drawing Artist
- Devadarshini as Venu's sister
- Jagan as Jaga
- Elango Kumaravel as Pandiya
- Mayilsamy as Garbage company worker
- Balaji as Beggar
- Uttej as Venkat Rayudu (Telugu version)
- Venu Madhav as Malligadu a.k.a. 'Manmadha' Rao (Telugu version)
- Mumaith Khan in an item number "Thachukko Thachukko"

== Production ==
A colony set was erected by art director Vairabalan in Nanakram Guda Cine Village, Hyderabad in fifteen days. The song "Thachukko Thachukko" was choreographed by Pony Verma was also shot at that location.

== Soundtrack ==
Song title	Singers	Lyrics
"Siruthooral"	Sadhana Sargam, Srinivas	Vaali
"Kadhal Poonga"	Udit Narayan, Sujatha Mohan	P. Vijay
"Kola Kolayaa"	KK, Sujatha Mohan	P. Vijay
"Do Re Me"	Kunal Ganjawala, Benny Dayal, Arjun	P. Vijay
"Vennilaa"	Harish Raghavendra, Cicilly	P. Vijay
"Thachukko Thachukko"	Anuradha Sriram, Mathangi	P. Vijay

== Critical reception ==
Malini Mannath of Chennai Online wrote, "A fairly neatly packaged film if you want to go in for something different". Sify wrote that "On the whole Ponniyin Selvan is a sweet and sentimental family drama that moves at a leisurely pace". Malathi Rangarajan from The Hindu wrote, "Creator Radha Mohan has done it again. With almost the entire technical team of his debut film in tow, Radha returns to prove that his `Azhagiya Theeyae' was not a mere flash in the pan". Lajjavathi of Kalki praised the dialogues of Viji, Gopika's performance but panned the unnecessary commercial inclusions however praised the director for boldly narrating a tale of a youngster's struggles and brickbats in society for the screen.
