= Brahmanandam Drama Company =

- Directed by: E. Srikanth Nahatha
- Written by: Ramesh-Gopi (dialogues)
- Produced by: Palli Kesava Rao; K Kishore Reddy; Chitte Nageshwar Rao
- Starring: Sivaji; Ravi Krishna; Brahmanandam; Kamalinee Mukherjee
- Edited by: Nagireddy
- Music by: Sai Karthik
- Release date: 11 July 2008
- Country: India
- Language: Telugu

Brahmanandam Drama Company is a 2008 Indian Telugu-language comedy film starring Sivaji, Ravi Krishna, Brahmanandam and Kamalinee Mukherjee. The film is directed by E. Srikanth Nahatha and produced by Palli Kesava Rao and K. Kishore Reddy. It is a remake of Hindi film Bhagam Bhag, which itself adapts subplots of the 1995 Malayalam film Mannar Mathai Speaking (a loose adaptation of Alfred Hitchcock's 1958 film Vertigo).

The film was a box office failure.

== Plot ==
Anandam runs a drama company. Vasu, Srinu, Soni are the heroes and heroine of the drama company. The company gets a chance to perform in Bangkok and the heroine gives them a hand. Anandam announces that whoever gets the heroine will become the hero in the company. From there on the film takes several twists as the duo are in pursuit of a heroine and strange circumstances follows.

== Cast ==
- Sivaji as Vasu
- Ravi Krishna as Sreenu
- Brahmanandam as Anandam
- Kamalinee Mukherjee as Arpitha
- Samiksha as Soni
- Raghu as Mahendra
- Ali
- Jeeva
- Raghu Babu
- Ravi Babu
- Gundu Hanumantha Rao
- Ranganath
- Sivaji Raja
- Dharmavarapu Subramanyam
- A. V. S.
- Apoorva
- Sasi Rekha
- Arti Puri
- Ram Jagan

== Soundtrack ==
Music by Sai Karthik. The audio was launched on 21 February 2008 in Prasad Labs, Hyderabad.

| No. | Title | Singer(s) | Length |
|---|---|---|---|
| 1. | "Remix Song" | Raja, Saketh, Parinika |
| 2. | "Ullasam" | Tippu, Suchitra |
| 3. | "Mellaga" | Shankar Mahadevan, Shreya Ghoshal |
| 4. | "Ra Ra Ra" | Ranjith, Suneetha, Saradhi |
| 5. | "Yendhuko" | S. P. B. Charan, K. S. Chithra |

== See also ==
- Remakes of films by Alfred Hitchcock
