= Sneham Kosam =

1999 film directed by K. S. Ravikumar

- Theatrical poster
- Directed by: K. S. Ravikumar
- Screenplay by: K. S. Ravikumar
- Dialogues by: Paruchuri Brothers
- Story by: Jyothi Krishna
- Based on: Natpukkaga
- Produced by: A. M. Rathnam
- Starring: Chiranjeevi; Meena
- Cinematography: K. Datthu
- Edited by: Kola Bhaskar
- Music by: S. A. Rajkumar
- Production company: Sri Surya Movies
- Release date: 1 January 1999
- Country: India
- Language: Telugu

Sneham Kosam (transl. For friendship) is a 1999 Indian Telugu-language drama film produced by A. M. Ratnam under the Sri Surya Movies banner. Directed by K. S. Ravikumar, the film stars Chiranjeevi in a dual role of father and son, along with Vijayakumar, Meena and Prakash Raj play supporting roles. Released on 1 January 1999, the film is a remake of Ravikumar's own Tamil film Natpukkaga (1998).

== Plot ==
Chinnayya works for a rich man Peddayya in a village. Despite being a labourer, Chinnayya has great respect and affection towards Peddayya. Peddayya too takes care of Chinnayya with great affection and looks after him as his own son. Peddayya hates his elder daughter Gowri and her husband Peddabbayi. Prabhavathy is Peddayya's younger daughter and she arrives to the village after completing her education from the US. Prabhavathy loves Chinnayya, but Chinnayya does not reciprocate, thinking this would be a betrayal of Peddayya's trust on him. Later Chinnayya too understands Prabhavathy's true love and accepts it.

One day, suddenly Prabhavathy accuses that Chinnayya tried to rape her. This angers Peddayya and he hits and sends Chinnayya out of his house. At this time, Simhadri, Chinnayya's father is released from jail and comes to meet Peddayya. Simhadri also worked under Peddayya before and has won Peddayya's trust so much. But Prabhavathy gets angry on seeing Simhadri and asks him to leave the house because Simhadri has been sent to jail for murdering Peddayya's wife Lakshmi a few years back. Prabhavathy also reveals the truth that she staged a drama to send Chinnayya away from her father. Peddayya gets shocked knowing the truth and feels bad that he has misunderstood Chinnayya believing his daughter's false words.

Chinnayya also hates his father Simhadri from childhood days as he was accused of killing Lakshmi. The story moves to a flashback as Peddayya finally reveals the truth behind Lakshmi's death to Chinnayya. Simhadri was a loyal servant in Peddayya's home. Peddabbayi is the younger brother of Lakshmi and his wedding is arranged with Gowri. On the day of marriage, Lakshmi gets to know about Peddabbayi's plans to rob Peddayya's properties and decides to cancel the wedding. But Peddabbayi injures Lakshmi badly and hides her in a room and the marriage is done. But Simhadri finds Lakshmi and gets to know all the truth about Peddabbayi. Before he could go and stop the marriage, it is already done and so he does not want Peddabbayi to go to jail as that would impact Gowri's life. Lakshmi is dead and Simhadri accepts that he has murdered Lakshmi for money and gets arrested by police. This makes Gowri and Prabhavathy to hate him and his family.

But Peddayya does not believe this and goes to jail to meet Simhadri and asks the truth. Simhadri tells all the truth to Peddayya and gets a promise that Peddayya should not reveal this truth to anyone else as Gowri will be alone then. Peddayya agrees but sends Peddabbayi out of his home. Gowri also leaves his home without knowing the truth and understanding her father. The story comes to the present and a wedding is planned between Prabhavathy and Peddabbayi's younger brother Chinnababu, the third of the siblings. On the day of marriage Gowri learns the truth about Lakshmi's death and reveals it to everyone. Peddabbayi tries to kill Gowri. But Simhadri comes in between, gets stabbed and dies. Peddabbayi gets killed by Chinnababu after knowing the truth that his sister, Lakshmi, was killed by none other than Peddabbayi. Meanwhile, Peddayya cries in front of Simhadri's dead body and he also dies along with him. The movie ends with Chinnayya and Prabhavathy getting married.

== Cast ==
- Chiranjeevi as Simhadri and Chinnayya
  - Dilip Kumar Salvadi as young Chinnayya
- Meena as Prabhavathi
- Vijayakumar as Peddayya
- Sujatha as Lakshmi
- Sithara as Gowri
- Prakash Raj as Peddabbayi
- Ranjith as Chinnababu
- Nirmalamma as Simhadri's mother
- Brahmanandam
- Kota Srinivasa Rao as Govindayya
- Babu Mohan
- Mallikarjuna Rao as Onda
- M. S. Narayana as Annavaram
- Gundu Hanumantha Rao as Auto driver
- K. S. Ravikumar as Airport passenger and Limping priest (cameo appearance)

== Production ==
In December 1997, Rajinikanth announced that his next film would be directed by K. S. Ravikumar, who had made the successful 1995 film Muthu with the actor. Filming was initially slated to begin in April 1998, but the FEFSI strike delayed proceedings and Ravikumar was only able to complete his previous film Natpukkaga by June 1998. A. M. Rathnam, who produced Natpukkaga requested Ravikumar to remake the film in Telugu with Chiranjeevi in the lead. Though initially reluctant, he accepted to quickly remake the film in Telugu as Sneham Kosam. The film's shooting was completed in fifty-six days.

== Soundtrack ==
Sneham Kosam

Soundtrack album by S. A. Rajkumar
- Released: 1999
- Genre: Soundtrack
- Length: 23:31
- Language: Telugu
- Label: Aditya Music
- Producer: S. A. Rajkumar

The music and background score was composed by S. A. Rajkumar. Music was released by Aditya Music Company. Rajkumar later remade "Gundello" as "Megham Udaithu" for Tamil film Maayi.

No.	Title	Lyrics	Singer(s)	Length
1.	"Kaikaluru"	Veturi	Udit Narayan, Kavita Krishnamurthy	4:26
2.	"Gundello Gubulu"	A. M. Rathnam	Sowmya	4:45
3.	"Ayyagaru Avunandi"	A. M. Rathnam	Mano, P. Jayachandran	4:34
4.	"Meesamunna Nestama"	Sirivennela Seetharama Sastry	Rajesh	4:36
5.	"Voohalalo Voopirilo"	Bhuvanachandra	S. P. Balasubrahmanyam, Sujatha Mohan	5:10
Total length:				23:31

== Release ==
The film was scheduled to release in November 1998 but was delayed.

=== Reception ===
Rakesh P. of The Deccan Herald wrote that "On the whole a family entertainer". Andhra Online wrote "In a different role altogether, Chiranjeevi impresses while Vijay Kumar too does justice to his role. Nothing much to be said about Meena’s acting".

== Awards ==
Year	Nominee / work	Award	Result
1999	Chiranjeevi	Filmfare Award for Best Telugu Actor	Won

== Box-office ==
The film was a huge grosser and one of the biggest hits in 1999. The film ran for 50 days in 89 centres and 100 days in 52 centres.
