= A. M. Jyothi Krishna =

Indian actor and director

- Born: 1981 (age 44–45)
- Occupations: Actor; Director
- Years active: 2003–present
- Spouse: Aishwarya
- Father: A. M. Rathnam
- Relatives: Ravi Krishna (brother)

Arani Muni Jyothi Krishna is an Indian film director and screenwriter in the Tamil and Telugu film industries. He is the elder son of producer A. M. Rathnam and eldest brother of actor Ravi Krishna.

== Career ==
Jyothi Krishna at 17 was credited with the story of his father, A. M. Ratnam's production Natpukaaga, starring Sarath Kumar and the film performed well at the box office. He was also story writer for Chiranjeevi's film Sneham Kosam and was also involved in story discussions of Rajinikanth's hit film Padayappa. He went on to make his directorial debut in the A. R. Rahman musical Enakku 20 Unakku 18, starring Tarun, Trisha Krishnan and Shriya Saran. His next, Kedi, featured his brother Ravi Krishna in the lead role, whilst Ileana D'Cruz and Tamannaah Bhatia were also in the cast.

In 2010, Jyothi Krishna began work on his acting debut with Ooh La La La, scheduled for release in 2012. His next directorial project was Oxygen, set to release on 30 November 2017.

== Filmography ==
=== As director ===
| Year | Film | Language | Notes |
|---|---|---|---|
| 2003 | Enakku 20 Unakku 18; Nee Manasu Naaku Telusu | Tamil; Telugu | |
| 2006 | Kedi | Tamil | |
| 2012 | Ooh La La La | Tamil | |
| 2017 | Oxygen | Telugu | |
| 2023 | Rules Ranjann | Telugu | |
| 2025 | Hari Hara Veera Mallu | Telugu | Co-directed by Krish Jagarlamudi |

=== As actor ===
| Year | Film | Role | Notes |
|---|---|---|---|
| 2012 | Ooh La La La | Surya | |

=== As story writer ===
| Year | Film | Language | Notes |
|---|---|---|---|
| 1998 | Natpukkaga | Tamil | |
| 1999 | Padayappa | Tamil | Story discussion |

=== As presenter ===
- Vedalam (2015)
