= Grade 2 =

Grade 2 may refer to:

- Second grade, the second year of primary education
- Grade 2 (band), an English punk band
- Grade 2, in horse racing, a category of group races
- Grade II and Grade II*, in the United Kingdom, categories of listed buildings
