= Niranj Suresh =

Niranj Suresh നിരഞ്ജ് സുരേഷ്
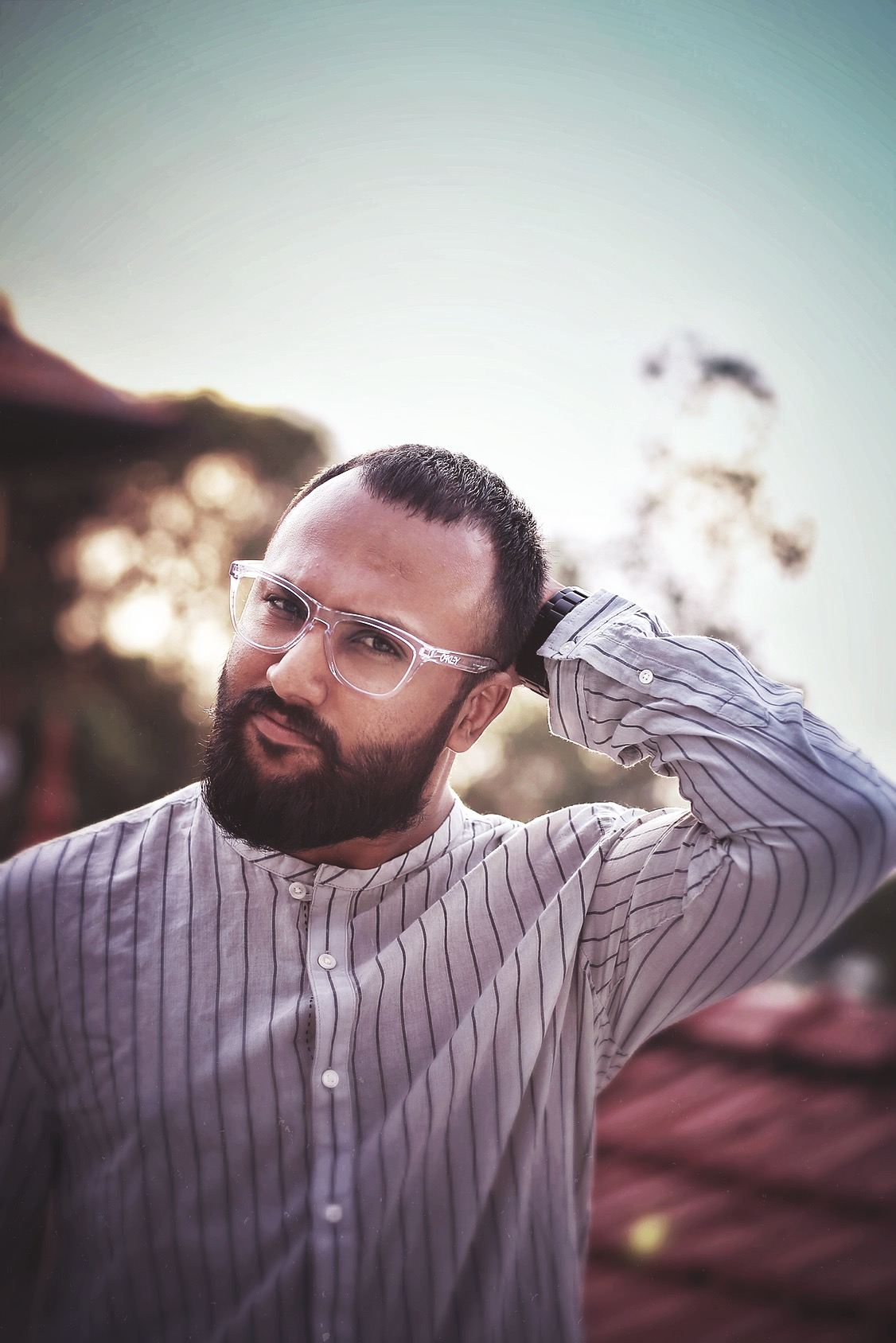
- Niranj Suresh

Background information
- Born: Niranj A. Suresh; 6 March 1990; Ernakulam, Kerala, India
- Origin: Mar Athanasius College of Engineering
- Genres: Indian music, playback singing
- Occupations: Singer, actor, director
- Years active: 2013–present

Niranj Suresh (born 1990) is an Indian musician, playback singer, Composer and actor. Niranj is the lead vocalist of the Indian rock bands Motherjane and Nemesis. He is also the lead vocalist and songwriter of a progressive rock band called Blank planet. He also started his own solo venture "Nrj Project" in 2017.

Niranj started his career in playback singing after singing in the movie Asha Black. In a short span of four years, Niranj has made his presence felt in the Malayalam music industry with his distinct vocal style and has also made his Tamil debut.

== Personal life ==
Niranj Suresh was born in Edappally, Kerala in 1990. He is the eldest child of Dr. Suresh Narayanan, Physics Professor and Dr. Anila Suresh, Physics Professor and Research Guide at Union Christian College, Aluva and has a younger sibling Nikhil.A.Suresh. Niranj did his schooling from Bhavans Vidya Mandir, Elamakkara, Kochi and later Engineering course from Mar Athanasius College of Engineering, Kothamangalam.

He was a Junior Division NCC Cadet and bagged Chief Minister's gold medal for the best cadet of the state (2005). He also represented Kerala in the Republic day parade, Delhi (2005).

He got married in April 2018 in Kerala to Dr. Radhika Lal, an ENT specialist.

== Career ==
He found his taste for music from his childhood days. During his college days, he was part of the college band and later joined a metal core band NEMESIS. In 2013, he joined Blank planet as their lead vocalist and songwriter. They released a single called MAYA on 23 December 2015 which was directed and edited by Niranj himself. They are currently working on their EP which is scheduled to release by 2017.

Niranj entered into Playback singing after singing for the film Asha Black. His vocals were noted after singing for the Malayalam film Thoppil Joppan which was a blues style rendition. He has sung for various music directors like Vidyasagar, Gopi Sundar, Shaan Rahman, Deepak Dev and Bijibal and has many hit songs under his name like "Thechille penne", "Innalekalil", "Roshomon", "Sa Re Ga Ma" followed by many more songs in recent Malayalam movies. He also made his debut in Tamil music under the guidance of Vishal Chandrasekhar, with the song "Pattikichu Pathiya" for the movie Kee.

Niranj's music ranges between a variety of genres like from Western music, blues, punk rock and Heavy metal music. He is currently working on his solo album which is about to get released soon

== Discography ==
=== Films ===
Year	Film	Song	Music director
2014	Asha Black	"Nannaavoolla"	Jecin George
2014	Beware of Dogs	"Maarimukil"	Bijibal
2015	2 Countries	"Title Song"	Gopi Sundar
2015	Rock Star	"Bhoogolam"	Prashant Pillai
2016	Anuraga Karikkin Vellam	"Neeyo Njaano"	Prashant Pillai
2016	Thoppil Joppan	"Thoppil Joppan"	Vidyasagar
2017	Sakhavu	"Lokam Ennum"	Prashant Pillai
2017	Sakhavu	"Theyyam Thinthaka"	Prashant Pillai
2017	Godha	"Innalekalil"	Shaan Rahman
2017	Aby	"Leysa Aleysa"	Bijibal
2017	Role Models	"Thechille Penne"	Gopi Sundar
2017	Kadamkadha	"Palamaathiri"	Deepankuran
2017	Villain	"Angakale"	4 Musics
2017	Villain	"Villain Promo Song"	4 Musics
2017	Diwanjimoola Grand Prix	"Innale Innale "	Gopi Sundar
2017	Diwanjimoola Grand Prix	"Kaatte Poora Kaatte"	Gopi Sundar
2017	Solo	"Roshmon"	Prashant Pillai
2017	Theeram	"Poru Nirayum"	Sankar Sharma
2017	Masterpiece	"Theme Song"	Deepak Dev
2017	History of Joy	"Puthumazhayitha"	Jovey George Sujo
2018	Street Lights	"Kaalam"	Adarsh Abraham
2018	Kee	"Pathikichu Pathiya"	Vishal Chandrashekar
2018	Charminar	"Poove Poove"	Jecin George
2018	Kala Viplavam Pranayam	"Idam Valam"	Athul Anand
2018	Kala Viplavam Pranayam	"Thirakal"	Athul Anand
2018	Kala Viplavam Pranayam	"Vaanolam"	Athul Anand
2018	Kuttanadan Marpappa	"Sa Re Ga Ma Pa"	Rahul Raj
2018	Naam	"Ellarum Onnaane"	Sandeep and Ashwin
2018	Naam	"Getout House"	Sandeep and Ashwin
2018	Naam	"Adichu Polichu"	Sandeep and Ashwin
2018	Naam	"Thudikottunne"	Sandeep and Ashwin
2018	Naam	"Oru Naalil"	Sandeep and Ashwin
2018	BTech	"Azadi"	Rahul Raj
2018	Cuban Colony	"Thottu Thottu Poyee"	Aloshya Kaavumpurath
2018	Mandharam	"Kanne Kanne"	Mujeeb Majeed
2018	Joseph	"Poomuthole"	Ranjin Raj
2018	Ennalum Sarath	"Sasiyane"	Ousepachan
2018	Payal Kunjunni	"Ozhi Macha Ozhi"	Sharreth
2018	Nithya Haritha Nayakan	"Iniyum"	Ranjin Raj
2019	Vijay Superum Pournamiyum	"Paniyaake Paali"	Prince George
2019	Oru Caribbean Udayippu	"Thozhare"	4 Musics
2019	Irupathiyonnaam Noottaandu	"Aaraaro Ardhramayi"	Gopi Sundar
2019	Fancy Dress	"Ullile Moham Kunnolam"	Ratheesh Vegha
2019	Kalki	"Red Blue Black"	Jakes Bejoy
2019	Jack & Daniel	"Aarambambo"	Shaan Rahman
2019	Kettyolaanu Ente Malakha	"Pathivo Maarum"	William Francis
2019	Sullu	"Mariville"	Abhirami Suresh
2019	My Santa	"Santa Superstar"	Vidyasagar
2020	Dhamaka	"Kattumundedye"	Gopi Sundar
2020	World Famous Lover	"Boggu Ganilo"	Gopi Sundar
2020	Joshua	"Kanneer Peyyum"	Gopi Sundar
2020	Un Kadhal Irunthal	"Kathal Sol Solamale"	Bijibal
2021	Kapatadhaari	"Kapatadhaari"	Simon K King
2021	Vikrant Rona	"The Dead Man's Anthem"	B. Ajaneesh Loknath
2023	Within Seconds	"Akasham Thottu"	Ranjin Raj
2023	Kasargold	"Thanaro"	Niranj Suresh

=== Albums ===
Year	Album	Song	Singer
2020	Yennum Yellow	Kaalthaalam	Himself
2021	Hitham	Hitham	Himself

== Awards ==
Year	Award	Category	Song	Result
2018	Asianet Comedy Awards	Award for Best Comic Song	"Thechille Penne"	Won
2018	Mangalam Music Awards	Award for Best Trendy Singer	"Thechille Penne"	Won
