= Asha Black =

2014 Indian film by John Robinson

Asha Black / Nee Naan Nizhal
- Malayalam poster
- Directed by: John Robinson
- Screenplay by: John Robinson; Santhosh Laxman
- Story by: John Robinson
- Produced by: Bindhu John Varghese
- Starring: R. Sarathkumar; Arjun Lal; Ishitha Chauhan
- Cinematography: Alby
- Edited by: Nikhil Venu
- Music by: Jecin George
- Production company: Nimita Productions
- Release date: 10 October 2014
- Country: India
- Languages: Malayalam; Tamil

Asha Black is a 2014 Indian thriller film written and directed by John Robinson in his directorial debut and produced by Bindhu John Varghese. It was simultaneously shot in Malayalam and Tamil, with the latter version titled Nee Naan Nizhal (transl. You, me and the shadow). The film stars R. Sarathkumar and Arjun Lal, while Ishitha Chauhan plays the titular character. Manoj K. Jayan, Devan, and Krishnabhaskar Mangalasserri play supporting roles. The music was composed by Jecin George with cinematography by Alby and editing by Nikhil Venu. The film released on 10 October 2014.

The film deals with the dark alleys of the World Wide Web, showing how the unmonitored use of the Internet by young adults can make them prey to predators who supply pornographic material and how neglected children become victims of sexual abuse.

== Plot ==
Five people of Indian origin are killed in Kuala Lumpur, Malaysia, within a short period of time. At first, the attacks are believed to be racially motivated, but investigating officer Anwar Ali, a Tamilian of Indian origin, feels that there are no grounds for that claim. He and his team find a common factor among the victims on Facebook: they all had a mutual friend called "Asha Black". Asha is a 17-year-old girl addicted to making online friends and chatting with them 24/7.

An online romance blooms between "Asha Black" and Rohit, a musician based in Coimbatore. Rohit decides to go to Kuala Lumpur to meet her on her 18th birthday. With the help of Senthilnathan, a taxi driver, he reaches Asha's house, but unfortunately, she has committed suicide. Then, it is revealed that Asha was a victim of sexual abuse through Facebook, and she is addicted to it because her parents have no time to spend with her. Enraged, Rohit, with the help of Senthilnathan, kills Asha's tormentors and finally kills a security guard who sexually abused Asha when she was a young girl in school. Asha's own parents abandoned this news to safeguard their reputation. Anwar tracks down Rohit with all the evidence and arrests him but silently praises his killings. The film ends with Anwar realizing how parents' care and attention are important to children, stopping them from getting addicted to bad habits, and discussing with his daughter how to spend their weekend.

== Cast ==
- R. Sarathkumar as ASP Anwar Ali
- Arjun Lal as Rohit
- Ishitha Chauhan as Asha Srinivas (Asha Black / Nee Naan Nizhal)
- Manoj K. Jayan as Senthil Nathan
- Devan as Srinivas
- Krishnabhaskar Mangalasserri as Police Officer Ram
- Anjali Aneesh Upasana as Anwar Ali's wife
- Bhagath Manuel as Sidhu
- Pandi as Pandi
- Fathima Babu as Rohit's mother
- Rizabawa as Rohit's father
- Karthik Das as Rohit's friend
- Haridass as Police Inspector (formerly Asha's school security guard)
- Kottayam Nazeer (Malayalam) / M. S. Bhaskar (Tamil) as Thambi
- Vinod Kedamangalam (Malayalam) / Kadhal Arun Kumar (Tamil) as Thambi's assistant

== Production ==
The team shot scenes in Kerala and Malaysia in September 2013, with debutant director John Robinson revealing that the plot would revolve around the dangers of social networks. Arjun Lal, previously seen as a child/teenage artiste in Thanmathra (2005), made a comeback in a leading role. Though he played just a supporting role, the film used Sarath Kumar's presence to market the film extensively in both languages. The Tamil version was initially titled Narumughai.

== Soundtrack ==
Asha Black

Soundtrack album by Jecin George
- Released: 10 May 2014
- Recorded: 2014
- Genre: Feature film soundtrack
- Length: 25:52
- Language: Malayalam
- Label: Manorama Music
- Producer: Jecin George

Jecin George chronology
Asha Black (2014)	Charminar (2018)

The film's score and soundtrack are composed by Jecin George. Song lyrics were written by Din Nath Puthanchery and Jecin George. The audio release of the film was held on May 10, 2014.

No.	Title	Artist(s)	Length
1.	"Neermizhiyil Peeythozhiyaa"	Vijay Yesudas	5:26
2.	"Ningade Naatil"	Jecin George	4:39
3.	"Manjayi Peytha Ninne"	Sachin Warrier	5:26
4.	"Nannawoola (Remix)"	Jecin George, Niranj Suresh, Ribin Richard	4:23
5.	"Asha Black Theme (feat. Trancis Xavier)"	Jecin George, Trancis Xavier, Cochin Strings	3:16

== Reception ==
Paresh C. Palicha of Rediff.com rated the film 2/5 stars and wrote, "Message or no message, Asha Black is not a very interesting film". Regarding the Tamil version Nee Naan Nizhal, a critic from The Hindu concluded, "It's a weird love story and a crime thriller — and its big problem is that it can't balance both".
