= Instagraamam =

- Genre: Comedy
- Written by: J Ramakrishna Kulur; Mridul Nair
- Directed by: Mridul Nair
- Music by: Yakzan Gary Pereira; Neha Nair
- Country of origin: India
- Original language: Malayalam
- No. of seasons: 1
- No. of episodes: 4

Production
- Producer: Dr. Leena S
- Cinematography: Arun James; Pavi K. Pavan; Dhanesh Raveendranath
- Editor: Manoj Kunnath
- Production company: LS Films

Original release
- Network: Neestream
- Release: 22 February – 13 April 2021

Instagraamam is an Indian Malayalam television series written and directed by Mridul Nair featuring Deepak Parambol, Balu Varghese, Arjun Ashokan and Ganapathy S. Poduval.

== Cast ==
- Deepak Parambol as Kaliyeduth Sukesh
- Balu Varghese as Anonymous
- Arjun Ashokan
- Ganapathi S. Poduval as Society Dutt
- Subheesh Sudhi as Padmarajan Andippara
- Sabumon Abdusamad as Q Chandran
- Alencier Ley Lopez as Kaliyeduth Kannan
- Shani Shaki as Puncture Sudhi
- Dinesh Prabhakar as Sanal Kumar
- Mafia Sasi as Kittunni
- Mridul Nair as Shenoy(s)
- Shivaji Guruvayoor as DGP
- Kalabhavan Haneef as Head Constable
- Y. V. Rajesh as Shivadasan Andipara
- Babu Annur as Poduval Master
- Unni Rajan P. Dev as Unda Biju
- Jayarajan as Unda Sasi
- Hareesh Pengan as Meesha Rajan
- Kiran Nambiar as Unda Baiju
- Unni Raj Cheruvathur as Sudharshan
- P. Sivadas as Village Man
- Ranjith Poduval as Kuttan
- Sreejesh K. K. P. as Sreeju
- Rajesh Sharma as Sudhi's Father
- Arif Mushaiq as Thankal
- Sunil C. K. as Reporter
- Dijesh Kunjuttan as Comrade Khasak
- Vijayan as Varrier
- Renukan as Suresh
- Manoj K. U. as Damu
- Bastin Paul as Kaliparambu Bastin
- Sigish Mathew as Kaliparambu Sigish
- Sajeed Fort Kochi as Saji
- Maneesha K. S. as Singer
- Sreenath V. P. as Comrade (old man in Flash back)
- Sajitha Pallath as Unda Ramani
- Khais Muhammed as Theif
- Shyni Diwakar as Shyni
- Gayathri Ashok as Ayisha
- Jilu Joseph as Vanaja
- Vinod Kedamangalam as Food Inspector
- Aparna Janardanan as Anjana
- Ambika Rao as Sujatha
- Kolapulli Leela as Sukesh's Grandmother
- Alasandra Johnson as Sindhu Varrier
- Anjana Appukuttan as Sukitha
- Sneha Paleri as Mini
- Sangeetha Geethi as Pinky
- Ilhan as Ilayaraja
- Nima Chandran as Gym Jalaja
- Aadya Nayak as Chandran's Wife
- Ramesh Pisharody

=== Guest appearance ===
- Sunny Wayne
- Sidharth Menon
- Dain Davis
- Aditi Ravi
- Srinadi
- Saniya Iyappan
