= Kasargold =

2023 Indian film by Mridul Nair

- Theatrical release poster
- Directed by: Mridul Nair
- Written by: Mridul Nair; Sajimon Prabhakar
- Produced by: Vikram Mehra; Siddharth Anand Kumar; Suraj Kumar; Rinny Divakar
- Starring: Asif Ali; Sunny Wayne; Vinayakan
- Cinematography: Jebin Jacob
- Edited by: Manoj Kannoth
- Music by: Songs: Vishnu Vijay; Niranj Suresh; Score: Vishnu Vijay
- Production companies: Yoodlee Films; Mukhari Entertainment
- Release date: 15 September 2023
- Running time: 137 minutes
- Country: India
- Language: Malayalam

Kasargold is a 2023 Indian Malayalam-language action thriller film directed by Mridul Nair and produced by Yoodlee Films. It stars Asif Ali, Sunny Wayne and Vinayakan in the lead roles.

Principal photography began in September 2022 in Payyanur. The music was composed by Vishnu Vijay and Niranj Suresh, while the cinematography and editing were handled by Jebin Jacob and Manoj Kannoth.

Kasargold was released on 15 September 2023 to mixed reviews from critics. This movie was a box-office failure.

== Plot ==
Alby is a short-tempered man who along with his girlfriend Nancy smuggle gold to Kanhangad through Kannur International Airport for a jewellery owner Moosa Haji. On the way back, they meet with an accident and get into a fight with Faisal, but Nancy stops them and eventually leave to deliver the gold. Later, Nancy notices that the gold is missing and Alby tells Moosa about the situation. Moosa sends his men with Alby to search for Faisal. Faisal gets on a train and gets down at Kasaragod along with the missing gold, which his aides had stolen earlier from the car. He plans to take a bus to Sullia and sell the gold, but he finds about unavailability of buses due to strike. Faisal books a room in a lodge and stays there, where Alby meets him and it is revealed that the entire operation was planned by them.

Past: Alby is ordered to pick up a man named Muhammad, who has been working in Dubai. Muhammad is carrying gold worth ₹80 lakh and was supposed to sell the gold to Moosa and take the money. Alby was sent to help Muhammad with the deal. However, two other people sent by Firoz take the gold from Muhammad by posing as Moosa's men. After learning that he has been cheated, Muhammad goes to the police station to file a complaint, but later commits suicide. Later, Alby meets Muhammad's son Faisal and makes him understand about Firoz's involvement in Muhammad's death. Alby and Faisal join hands in exact revenge against Firoz.

Present: Moosa finds out that Alby is behind stealing the gold, where he consults with Narayanan and sends CI Alex to bring back Alby and Faisal. Alby and Faisal try to sell the gold in Kanhangad, but they almost get caught and manages to escape. They leave for Goa and meets Vishnu and his friends. Alby introduces himself and Faisal as James and Muneer, where they starts partying with them. Vishnu tells Alby that his father owns jewellery in Kasaragod. Alby discusses selling the gold to Vishnu's father, but Vishnu rejects the idea. Alex tracks them down and reaches Goa, where he breaks into their room and attacks them, but they manage to escape.

Alby and the gang head to an hotel, where they get into a fight with a few thugs and Vishnu's friend Vijayan gets attacked in the fight. Vishnu takes Faisal and Alby to a small hideout in a secluded forest, where they finds out that they are out of kerosene to start a fire. Faisal goes to a nearby house to get some kerosene, where he learns that Vishnu is actually Narayanan's nephew Suresh. Faisal goes back and informs Alby, but Suresh and his gang attack Alby and Faisal. Alby and Faisal manage to fight back, where they end up killing Suresh and his gang. Alex arrives at the location and shoots Faisal and Alby, but the cops arrests Alex as he is a suspended officer. Faisal dies in the shootout, but Alby manages to survive and sends a note to Alex in prison saying that he is coming for him for killing Faisal.

== Cast ==
- Asif Ali as Alby / aka James Albert
- Sunny Wayne as Faisal Muhammad aka Muneer
- Vinayakan as CI Alex Thomas Kavalkkaran
- Siddique as Moosa Haji
- Malavika Sreenath as Nancy Alby
- Sreeranjini Nair as Divya, Faisal's wife
- Deepak Parambol as Vishnu (Sura)
- Dhruvan as Rajeesh (Sreenath)
- Prasant Murali as Vijayan (Kumar)
- Abhiram Radhakrishnan as Vinod (Rajesh)
- Dhananjay as Akshai Narayanan
- P.P. Kunhikrishnan as Comrade Narayanan
- Sampath Ram as Vijay Pujari
- Babu Annur as Muhammad
- James Elia as Jordy
- Geethi Sangeetha as Jameela
- Chithra Nair as Reshmi
- Ratheesh Balakrishnan Poduval as Firoz
- Sagar Surya as Rihan
- Sundar Pandyan as gireesh

== Production ==
=== Development ===
Kasargold is Asif Ali and Mridul Nair's second collaboration after B.Tech. It is also the third Malayalam project of Yoodlee Films, a Saregama subsidiary, following Padavettu and Kaapa. According to director Mridul Nair, the film was originally scheduled to shoot during the second COVID-19 lockdown phase, but it was later pushed back due to pandemic restrictions.

=== Filming ===
The principal photography began with a switch-on ceremony performed by MLA T. I. Madhusoodanan in Payyanur on 26 September 2022. The first clap was given by Ratheesh Balakrishnan Poduval, who is the director of Nna Thaan Case Kodu.

=== Marketing ===
During Asif Ali's birthday on 4 February 2023, Dulquer Salmaan revealed the film's motion poster featuring Asif Ali, Sunny Wayne and Vinayakan through social media. The official teaser of the film was unveiled by Prithviraj, Tovino Thomas and Unni Mukundan through their social media handles on 14 July 2023.

== Music ==
Kasargold

Soundtrack album by Vishnu Vijay, Niranj Suresh
- Released: March 23, 2023
- Venues: Kochi; Chennai
- Studios: K7 Studios; 2 Bar Q Studios
- Genre: Feature film soundtrack
- Length: 10:26
- Language: Malayalam
- Label: Saregama
- Producers: Vishnu Vijay; Niranj Suresh

The songs are composed by Vishnu Vijay and Niranj Suresh, and the background score is composed by Vishnu Vijay. On 23 March 2023, the first single titled "Thanaro" was released, composed by Niranj Suresh and written by Vaisakh Sugunan.

No.	Title	Lyrics	Music	Singer(s)	Length
1.	"Thanaro"	Vaisakh Sugunan	Niranj Suresh	Niranj Suresh & Thankachan Abhi	4:01
2.	"Alaye"	Muhsin Parari	Vishnu Vijay	Benny Dayal & Vishnu Vijay	3:32
3.	"I'm A Gold"	Vinayak Sasikumar	Niranj Suresh	Arjun Ashokan	2:53

== Release ==
=== Theatrical ===
Kasargold was censored with a U/A certificate by the Central Board of Film Certification. The film was released on 15 September 2023.

=== Home media ===
The digital rights were obtained by Netflix and began streaming it on 13 October 2023.

== Reception ==
=== Critical response ===
Kasargold received mixed reviews from critics.

Sajin Shrijith of The New Indian Express gave 3.5 out of 5 stars and wrote, "Kasargold is a fairly gripping, anxiety-inducing thriller that succeeds at creating a sense of claustrophobia, despite being set outdoors, by the time it gets to the closing credits." Sanjith Sidhardhan of OTTPlay gave 3.5 out of 5 stars and wrote, "Mridul Nair's Kasargold works because the makers seem to have been clear about what they wanted to accomplish with a movie like this – provide a theatrical experience to the audience by never letting the pace of the film slack. For most parts, they succeed." Anna Mathews of The Times of India gave 3 out of 5 stars and wrote, "Kasargold is engaging with a thrilling story and excellent acting, but you can't help feeling that it could have been gold, but isn't quite 24 carat."

Arjun Ramachandran of The South First gave 3 out of 5 stars and wrote, "Kasargold is a story that's inspired by the gold smuggling cases reported in Kerala. Brilliant action sequences and Asif Ali's swag make it a worthy watch." Cris of The News Minute gave 2.5 out of 5 stars and wrote, "Perhaps, if the writing had left a few stones unturned and been clearer of its stand, Kasargold could have been more enjoyable." Anandu Suresh of The Indian Express gave 2 out of 5 stars and wrote, "Though Kasargold had enough to create a memorable actioner, the film disappoints due to sloppy writing." Subhash K. Jha of Times Now gave 2 out of 5 stars and wrote, "There is a lot of pseudo-swag in Kasargold. It aims to be a modern-day fable on greed and retribution. But it ends up being neither Shakespearean nor Guy Ritchie-esque."

S. R. Praveen of The Hindu wrote, "Filmmaker Mirdul Nair, who debuted with B. Tech more than five years back, is content with exploring paths which have already been trodden several times by other filmmakers." Vishal Menon of Film Companion wrote, "Without committing entirely to its otherworldly pitch or its tense starting point, Kasargold remains stuck somewhere in the middle." Swathi P. Ajith of Onmanorama wrote, "While Kasargold may not feature the typical mass scenes, it successfully captivates the audience, largely due to the evocative score by Vishnu Vijay. The film adheres to the characteristic aesthetics of a new-gen movie, with a distinct, eye-catching set design in numerous scenes."
