= The Goat Life =

2024 film by Blessy

- Theatrical release poster
- Directed by: Blessy
- Screenplay by: Blessy
- Story by: Benyamin
- Based on: Aadujeevitham (2008) by Benyamin
- Produced by: Visual Romance
- Starring: Prithviraj Sukumaran; Jimmy Jean-Louis; K. R. Gokul
- Cinematography: Sunil K. S.
- Edited by: A. Sreekar Prasad
- Music by: A. R. Rahman
- Production company: Visual Romance
- Distributed by: Prithviraj Productions
- Release date: 28 March 2024
- Running time: 173 minutes
- Countries: India; United States
- Language: Malayalam
- Budget: ₹82 crore
- Box office: ₹158.50 crore

The Goat Life is a 2024 Malayalam-language survival drama film written, directed, and co-produced by Blessy. The film is an international co-production involving companies in India and the United States. It is an adaptation of the 2008 Malayalam best-selling novel Aadujeevitham, written by Benyamin, which is loosely based on the story of Najeeb Muhammad, a Malayali immigrant worker in Saudi Arabia. The film was initially banned in GCC countries except for the UAE. Subsequently, the ban was lifted in all the countries except in Kuwait and Saudi Arabia. The novel was also previously banned in the same countries. The film stars Prithviraj Sukumaran alongside Jimmy Jean-Louis and K. R. Gokul, with Talib Al Balushi, Rik Aby, Amala Paul and Shobha Mohan in supporting roles.

Blessy had wanted to adapt Aadujeevitham ever since he read the novel in 2008 and cast Prithviraj as the lead. The following year, he bought the rights from Benyamin and began writing the screenplay. However, due to budget constraints which prevented substantial progress, the film went into development hell. Blessy spent years searching for a producer, finally finding one in 2015, allowing the project to gain momentum. Jimmy Jean-Louis and Steven Adams joined Blessy as co-producers. A. R. Rahman composed the film's original soundtrack.

Principal photography took place in phases between March 2018 and July 2022 through six schedules in the deserts of Wadi Rum, Jordan and the Algerian desert in the Sahara with some scenes shot in Kerala, India. The crew was stranded in Jordan for 70 days from March to May 2020 due to the COVID-19 pandemic's restrictions. They were eventually repatriated to India via the Indian government's evacuation programme, the Vande Bharat Mission. Filming concluded on 14 July 2022. The cinematography was done by Sunil K. S while the editing was handled by A. Sreekar Prasad.

The film was released worldwide on 28 March 2024 to critical acclaim from critics, who praised Sukumaran's performance, technical aspects, music, direction and the editing. The film grossed over ₹158 crore (US$17 million). The Goat Life emerged as one the highest-grossing Malayalam films. A. R. Rahman won Hollywood Music in Media Awards and Hollywood Independent Music Awards in 2024. In Kerala State Awards, the film won multiple awards.

== Plot ==
In Saudi Arabia, Najeeb Muhammad and Hakim, two Malayali immigrants, arrive seeking a better life with visas arranged by their acquaintance Sreekumar. Stranded at the airport without knowing their employer, they are approached by a local Arab who fraudulently takes them to his place. Following a long journey, they are separated, with Najeeb left to work in a remote desert herding goats.

Enduring harsh conditions and isolation, Najeeb witnesses the demise of a fellow goat herder, realising the peril of his own situation. After years of suffering, he is reunited with Hakim, who introduces him to Ibrahim Khadiri, a Somalian goatherder with knowledge of multiple escape routes. They seize an opportunity during Khafeel's daughter's wedding, fleeing into the desert.

Their journey turns perilous as they struggle to find sustenance and direction, resulting in Hakim's death and Najeeb's near demise. Eventually, Khadiri also disappears. Alone in the desert, Najeeb eventually reaches civilisation with the help of a passing Arab, and finds a local Malayali restaurant owned by Kunjikka, who nurses him back to health.

However, Najeeb's troubles are far from over. He faces imprisonment due to his own documentation issues and he meets the Khafeel, who leaves him as he is not his official sponsor and cannot take him back. Despite this setback, Najeeb eventually returns home.

== Cast ==
- Prithviraj Sukumaran as Najeeb Muhammad
- Jimmy Jean-Louis as Ibrahim Khadiri
- K. R. Gokul as Hakim
- Amala Paul as Sainu, Najeeb's wife
- Shobha Mohan as Ummah, Najeeb's mother
- Talib Al Balushi as Kafeel
- Rik Aby as Jasser
- Nasar Karutheni as Kunjikka
- Robin Das as Hindiwala
- Baburaj Thiruvalla as Karuvatta Sreekumar
- Akef Najem as the Rich Man in the Rolls Royce

== Production ==
=== Development ===
In 2010, it was reported that Blessy had embarked upon the adaptation of Benyamin's 2008 Malayalam novel Aadujeevitham for a feature film. In April 2010, he told The Hindu that he was working on the screenplay and the film would be made on a wider canvas. He also confirmed that Prithviraj Sukumaran had been cast in the lead role. Blessy had been contemplating the adaptation of a literary work for cinema ever since he had a discourse with journalist and writer V. K. Ravi Varma Thampuran about the waning tradition of adapting literary works, which was popular in Malayalam cinema during the 1970s and 1980s. Blessy wanted to adapt Aadujeevitham for a big-budget film ever since he read it in 2008, "I was particularly attracted to the visual images that came through while reading the book". In the novel, Haripad native Najeeb Muhammad goes missing in Saudi Arabia where he ends up as a slave to a farm owner. In 2009, Blessy entered into a contractual agreement with Benyamin after discussing and reaching a consensus with director Lal Jose. This was because Jose had previously expressed interest in adapting the novel to Benyamin. Blessy began screenplay writing after obtaining the rights. He noted that the film would incorporate additional material beyond what is present in the book.

Reportedly, filming was set to begin in August 2010 at the deserts of Dubai and Rajasthan, but that did not happen. In 2012, Benyamin said that the film was still on discussion phase and had been postponed for the time being since its production cost was found to be not viable for a Malayalam film. Blessy had been discussing the film with Prithviraj since 2008. In 2015, recalling the film's stagnant development to date, Prithviraj said that there were occasions when they could work out the film, albeit with some compromises, but Blessy insisted on waiting for the right producer since he was not ready to compromise his vision. Jet Media Production's Jimmy Jean-Louis and Alta Global Media's Steven Adams also joined Blessy's Visual Romance Image Makers as producers. According to Prithviraj, Blessy had conceived The Goat Life as an "event film" in the lines of Life of Pi as the narrative goes from one event to the other non-linearly.

Parallel to the new announcement, also in November 2015, Blessy told to The Hindu that he was occupied with the research work of another film, which would be disclosed later, which would go on before The Goat Life. In May 2016, Blessy confirmed that he was busy with the pre-production work of the Hindi remake of his Malayalam film Thanmathra (2005) and The Goat Life would happen only after that. He later updated that work of both the films were progressing simultaneously and casting and scheduling would decide which film would go on first. Meanwhile, he was already through the production of documentary film 100 Years of Chrysostom (2018) which had begun earlier in May 2015, which he would complete in two years. In October 2016, Blessy said Aadujeevitham would begin filming in early 2017 and release in 2018. In mid-2017, he said that they had the screenplay ready but the locations had not been decided and production would start in November 2017 and the film would take 18 months to release.

On the challenges on adapting the novel, Blessy said, in the novel, Najeeb recollects his experience through soliloquy, which is easily conveyed through literary work, but it is difficult to depict on screen. The film's narrative is entirely different from the book. For example, in the latter half of the book, when the Arbab castigates Najeeb in Arabic, readers read it in Malayalam, whereas the film has to demonstrate how much the language distresses Najeeb. Unlike the book, the film cannot afford to be vague since viewers see everything on screen and may question the logic presented. For instance, the book says that Najeeb could not find a shadow under a stick, but there is a farm that can cast a shadow, "in a literary work, you don't have to address that because readers travel the route the writer takes them on". Moreover, the film has to show Najeeb's physical transformation. Above everything else, the film's visuals must surpass those imagined by the readers. Najeeb does not understand Arabic, the makers decided to avoid subtitles for those parts to provide viewers with the same experience as Najeeb. According to Prithviraj, "the film has this huge liberty of not having a language", as only about 20 percent of the film contains dialogues.

=== Casting ===
Suriya was initially considered and cast for the role of Najeeb and Blessy discussed with him, but he opted out due to busy schedules and prior commitments. Prithviraj agreed to do the film while he was at the sets of Pokkiri Raja (2010) in 2008. Najeeb Muhammad from Benyamin's novel is partially based on the real-life experiences of Najeeb. Prithviraj said, although he is not a pious person, Najeeb has staunch focus on faith. There is a physical, psychological, and spiritual journey for the character. For three years, he interacts more with animals than humans, so he would "become" one among. For Najeeb's role, Blessy wanted an actor who could dedicate at least 1 1/2 years for the film, which Prithviraj agreed. Prithviraj had to gain and lose weight to show Najeeb's physical transformation on screen. He increased his weight to 98 kilograms for playing the character in the starting sequences of the film with a pot belly and had to reduce his weight to 67 kilograms by the end of the film. Having lost 31 kilograms, Prithviraj said he followed an unhealthy diet which he would not recommend anyone to follow. He blacked-out while filming a scene. There was always a doctor on call at the set.

As of 2015, no other actor beside Prithviraj was finalised. In 2016, Blessy said he is scouting for actors in Somalia and such places. In 2017, a casting call was released by the makers through social media inviting applicants for a young male and female and a middle-aged female. In February 2018, Amala Paul confirmed through social media that she is playing Sainu. Sainu, Najeeb's wife, is portrayed in different phases of her life. According to Blessy, the role would tap the potential of Amala, considering the roles she had done so far. Beside co-producing, Jimmy Jean-Louis played a major role as Ibrahim Khadiri. Omani actor Talib al Balushi played the role of Najeeb's boss. Rik Aby, a Sudanese actor based in the United Arab Emirates also played a role.

=== Filming ===
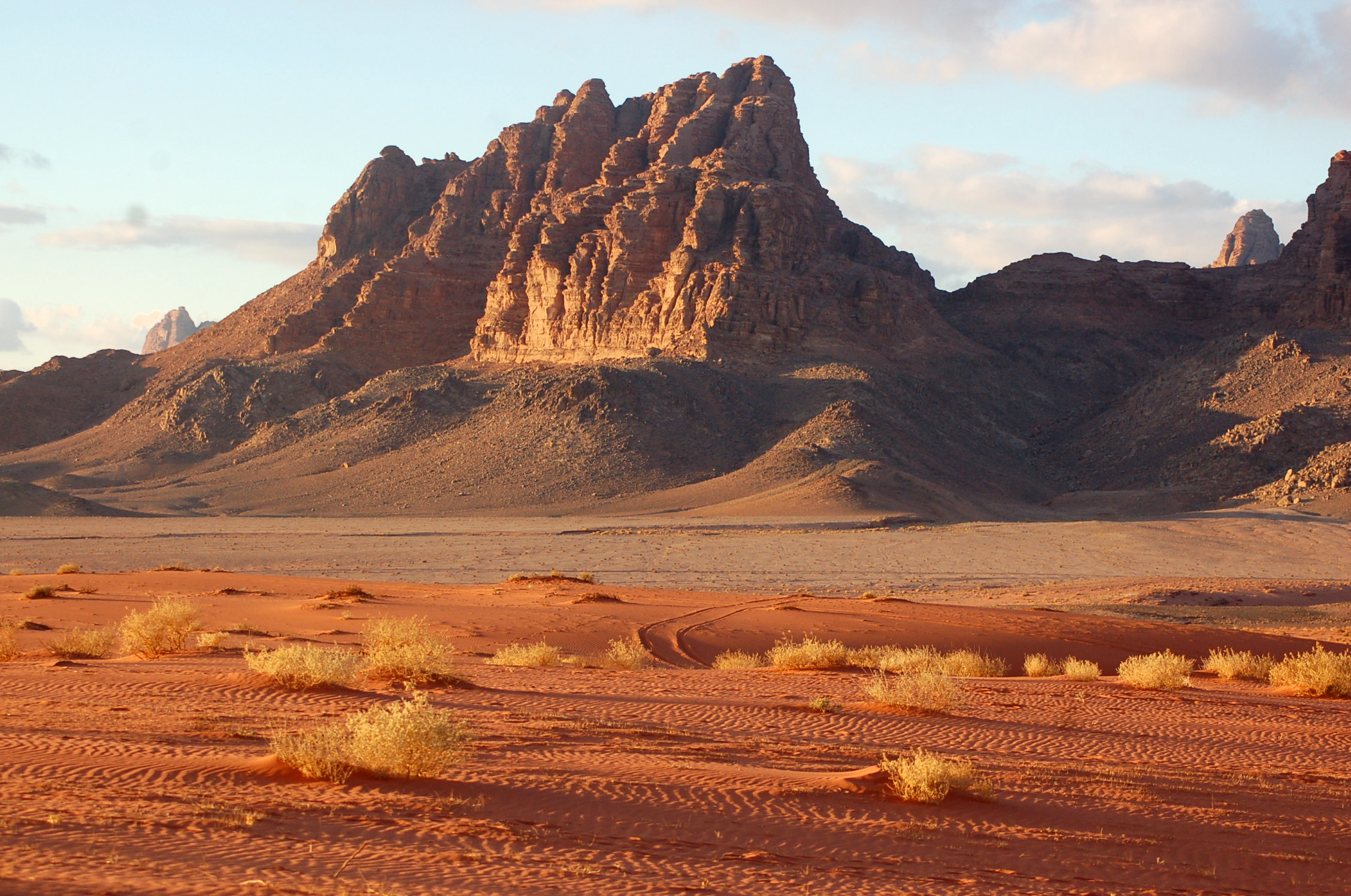
The crew was stranded in Wadi Rum for 70 days during the 2020 COVID-19 pandemic in Jordan

Although the film is set in Saudi Arabia, the production team was not granted permission to shoot there, hence they had to move to other countries. The film's major scenes take place in desert places. Principal photography began on 1 March 2018 with a customary pooja function. The first schedule began in Thiruvalla, Pathanamthitta, Kerala, where flashback scenes of Najeeb's life before he arrived in Saudi Arabia was shot. At that time, the plan was to complete filming in 150 days spanning 18 months. That month, filming also took place at Muthalamada railway station in Palakkad border. The Kerala schedule was completed by April first week. About 25 percent of the film was finished, with major portions yet to be shot. The second schedule began in Jordan in January 2019. Prithviraj joined the sets by the end of that month.

The subsequent schedule, originally charted from March to early April 2020 in the Wadi Rum desert in Jordan, was delayed by the COVID-19 pandemic in Jordan. Filming finally began on 16 March. However, actor Talib al Balushi and his translator were quarantined, causing him to miss the shoot after Oman evacuated its citizens. Similarly, a Sudanese actor was quarantined, and some actors were not able to reach the location due to the cancellation of flights. Nevertheless, the shoot continued with Prithviraj. After Jordan initiated the lockdown, The Chief Minister of Kerala directed the NORKA to provide assistance through the Indian embassy. Since international flights were cancelled, the Jordanian authorities allowed the crew to continue shooting while remaining isolated. After eight days of filming, they were forced to stop on 24 March, but they managed to obtain permission to shoot for another 17 days. However, the permission was revoked on 27 March after a curfew was imposed. Blessy then requested assistance from the Kerala government, through Kerala Film Chamber of Commerce, to repatriate them. They stayed idle for the next 32 days, during which Prithviraj further reduced his body weight. When restrictions eased, filming resumed in April last week and continued until 17 May. The 58-member crew, along with other Indian citizens, were repatriated by the Government of India as part of Vande Bharat Mission and reached India on 22 May. In their 70-day stay in the desert camp, they filmed for 25 days. Although filming was not finished there, crucial scenes were shot, which required them to return at a later date. Even with their original plan, they had to return for scenes featuring an American actor. About 50 percent of the film was completed with the schedule.

The next schedule began in April 2022 at Timimoun in the Sahara desert, Algeria. As per their plan, they needed 40 days in Algeria and another 35 days in Jordan. Algerian schedule continued to May. In the same month, shooting relocated to Wadi Rum, Jordan. Jordanian schedule was completed on 14 June, thus concluding the film's international schedules. Filming went to Perunad, Ranni, Kerala on 22 June for the final schedule. Jail sequence was shot there on set. Filming in its entirety wrapped up on 14 July 2022. K. U. Mohanan and Sunil K. S. were the cinematographers, Resul Pookutty was the sound designer, A. Sreekar Prasad was the editor, Stephy Zaviour was the costume designer, and Ranjith Ambady was the makeup artist. In October 2022, Prithviraj told to Variety that the film is undergoing post-production and is aiming for a film festival slot in 2023.

== Music ==
The original score and songs for the film were composed by A. R. Rahman in his third film in Malayalam after Yoddha (1992) and Malayankunju (2022). The soundtrack featured four songs and an instrumental track with lyrics by Rafeeq Ahamed. A grand audio launch function of the film was held on 10 March 2024 at the Adlux International Convention Centre in Angamaly, with the film's cast and crew members along with prominent celebrities in attendance. However, except for the promotional video song "Hope" which released on social media platforms on the same day, the soundtrack was released a week later.

== Marketing ==
In April 2023, Deadline Hollywood released an unexpected trailer for the film. Blessy expressed dissatisfaction, clarifying that the trailer was intended for agents for screening at film festivals and business purposes, not for public release. He emphasised that the post-production work on the clips, including colour grading and music, was incomplete, with the music only composed on a keyboard. Blessy disowned it as the official theatrical release trailer. Despite this, the production team officially released the same trailer shortly afterward. In late-November 2023, the official social media handles for the film were revealed. In late-December, the team asked fans to design posters for their participation at a special event with Prithviraj and Blessy.

On 10 January 2024, the first look of the film was revealed by Prabhas through his social media handles, which featured Prithviraj in a bearded and gloomy appearance as Najeeb Muhammed. Blessy and Benyamin attended the seventh edition of the Kerala Literature Festival held on 13 January, to share their insights on the adaptation from novel to film. Two more posters were revealed on 17 and 31 January, one featuring Prithviraj's gloomy look and the other that featured the actor in a younger look, reminiscing the character earlier days. On 11 February, the team shared a video subtitled Corona Days, revealing on the turbulent production where the team stranded in Jordan during the COVID-19 pandemic.

An official website for the film was launched by Blessy and Rahman in late-February 2024. The film's theatrical trailer was unveiled on 9 March 2024. The trailer was overwhelmingly well received, with media outlets such as Film Companion describing the visuals as "spellbinding", and The Indian Express-based critic compared Prithviraj's performance to that of Leonardo DiCaprio's in The Revenant (2015).

== Release ==
=== Theatrical ===
In late-November 2023, it was announced that the film would be released theatrically on 10 April 2024, ahead of the Eid al-Fitr and Vishu weekend. However, in February, the film was advanced to 28 March 2024.

The film was distributed by Prithviraj Productions in Kerala, Hombale Films in Karnataka, Mythri Movie Makers in Andhra Pradesh and Telangana, Red Giant Movies in Tamil Nadu and AA Films in North India.

=== Home media ===
The film premiered on Netflix from 19 July 2024.

== Reception ==
=== Box office ===
On the opening day of its release, the film collected ₹16.03 crore worldwide with ₹8.85 crore from India of which ₹5.85 crore coming from Kerala. On its second day the film grossed ₹7.20 crore in India bringing its two-day running total at the Indian box office to ₹16 crore. In its first four-day weekend the film grossed ₹34 crore in India which is the biggest ever start for a Malayalam film at the Indian box office, beating Lucifer and grossed ₹23.25 crore in Kerala which was highest weekend gross in Kerala for Malayalam films surpassing Bheeshma Parvam. The total collection of The Goat Life in its first four-day weekend worldwide was ₹65 crore; the highest ever for a Malayalam film. The film grossed ₹75 crore in 5 days of its release registering the biggest first Monday collection for a Malayalam film. The film grossed over ₹87 crore (£8.23M, $10.4M) worldwide in the first week of its release. It crossed ₹100 crore at the worldwide box office in 9 days of its release becoming the fastest Malayalam film to reach the mark surpassing 2018 (11 days). The worldwide gross was ₹125 crore in 14 days. In 25 days, the film grossed ₹150 crore worldwide. It concluded its run with worldwide gross estimated to be ₹158.50 crore.

=== Critical response ===
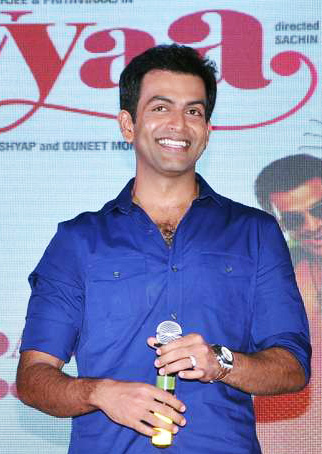
Prithviraj received the Kerala State Film Award for Best Actor for his performance

The Goat Life received positive reviews from critics, who praised Prithviraj's performance, technical aspects and the editing. On the review aggregator website Rotten Tomatoes, 78% of 9 critics' reviews are positive, with an average rating of 7.5/10.

Arjun Menon of Rediff.com rated 4/5 stars and noted, "Aadujeevitham marks a new direction for Malayalam cinema, where ambition meets resources and the right people, all in favour of stories that deserve to be told on the biggest stage of them all." Anandu Suresh of The Indian Express gave 4/5 stars and wrote "While Blessy meticulously selected only the necessary moments for the film adaptation of The Goat Life, his script fell short throughout in building sufficient tension." Janani K of India Today gave 3/5 stars and wrote "Aadujeevitham is an immersive film that banks on Prithviraj's performance and its technical brilliance."

S R Praveen of The Hindu wrote, "If hard work were the sole benchmark for a film, Aadujeevitham would rank right up there among the best. And, quite a lot of the hard work does pay off too. Yet, it leaves one with the wish that the script had enough to break the monotony that sets in at some points." Latha Sreenivasan of The Hindustan Times wrote, "The Prithviraj Sukumaran film must be watched on the big screen for a wholesome experience; no other actor could have done the role". Nirmal Jovial of The Week wrote, "Blessy devoted 16 years to sculpting this visual masterpiece, meticulously tailored for the theatrical experience. Arjun Menon of the Film Companion wrote, "Aadujeevitham is a brisk, relentless exercise in storytelling that is anchored by Prithviraj Sukumaean's career best performance and Blessy's inspired vision.

Mukund Setlur of the Deccan Herald wrote, "Actor Prithviraj and the cinematography team are the soul of this film. The camera work is top-notch - it skilfully captures the desolate deserts of Jordan and Algeria." Nishad Thaivalappil of Network18 Group wrote, " The acting, cinematography, story, and screenplay, everything makes it a cinematic experience you should not miss out on."

=== Controversy ===
Aside from the ban in the GCC, it was rumoured that Talib Al Balushi was barred from entering Saudi Arabia for his role. The actor also faced cyberattacks due to that. Talib later denied all these. The reaction to the film in Saudi Arabia was overwhelmingly negative, with critics accusing it of damaging the country's image and calling for a boycott of Netflix for streaming the movie. Akef Najem says he regrets his role and that he didn't fully read the script back then.

== Accolades ==
Year	Award	Category	Winner	Ref
2024	Kerala State Film Awards	Best Director	Blessy	
2024	Kerala State Film Awards	Best Screenplay (adapted)	Blessy	
2024	Kerala State Film Awards	Best Actor	Prithviraj Sukumaran	
2024	Kerala State Film Awards	Best Film with Popular Appeal and Aesthetic Value	Visual Romance	
2024	Kerala State Film Awards	Best Cinematography	Sunil K. S.	
2024	Kerala State Film Awards	Best Sound Mixing	Resul Pookutty, Sarath Mohan	
2024	Kerala State Film Awards	Best Makeup Artist	Ranjith Ambadi	
2024	Kerala State Film Awards	Special Mention (Acting)	K. R. Gokul	
2024	Kerala State Film Awards	Best Processing Lab / Colourist	Vaishak Shiva	
2024	Hollywood Music in Media Awards	Best Original Score – Independent Film (Foreign Language)	A. R. Rahman	
