= Najeeb Muhammad =

Indian public figure

- നജീബ് മുഹമ്മദ്
- Born: 1970 (age 55–56); Arattupuzha, Alappuzha district, Kerala, India
- Citizenship: Indian
- Occupations: Fisherman, civil icon, former migrant labourer.
- Known for: Real-life subject of Aadujeevitham, The Goat Life
- Spouse: Sabiyath
- Children: 2 (Safeer and Safeena)
- Awards: ECI SVEEP Icon (2024)

Najeeb Muhammad (born c. 1970) is an Indian public figure from Kerala. He gained international recognition as the real-life subject of Malayalam novel Aadujeevitham (2008) and its 2024 film adaptation The Goat Life. His ordeal as an enslaved laborer in the Saudi Arabian desert has become a prominent narrative in the discourse on migrant labor rights and the Kafala system in the Gulf Cooperation Council region. In 2024, he was designated as a district-level icon by the Election Commission of India for the Systematic Voter Education and Electoral Participation (SVEEP) program in Alappuzha district.

== Early life and migration ==
Najeeb Muhammad was born in Arattupuzha, a coastal village in the Alappuzha district of Kerala. Before migrating, he worked as a sand miner in the Arattupuzha river. In 1992, seeking a better livelihood to support his family and his then-pregnant wife Sabiyath, he sought employment in Saudi Arabia.

== Enslavement and escape (1992–1995) ==
Upon his arrival at King Khalid International Airport in Riyadh in April 1992, Muhammad was intercepted by an individual posing as his employer (kafeel). He was transported to a remote location in the desert and forced into enslaved labor as a goatherd.

For the next three and a half years, Muhammad was subjected to extreme isolation and physical abuse. He was forced to tend to hundreds of goats with minimal food primarily stale khubz softened with goat's milk—and was denied access to basic hygiene, including water for bathing. His experiences under the Kafala system have since been cited in academic studies analyzing the sociological and psychological impacts of the sponsorship system on South Asian migrants.

In 1995, Muhammad managed to escape the farm during the temporary absence of his captor. After wandering through the desert for over a day, he reached a highway and was eventually assisted by a traveler who drove him to Riyadh. Following a period of incarceration at Sumesi Prison (Inmate No. 13858), he was deported to India on August 13, 1995.

== Later life and civil role ==
After returning to Kerala, Muhammad initially resumed manual labor. In 1997, he migrated again, this time to Bahrain, where he was given a free visa by his brother-in-law and worked in a scrap material company for over two decades. He left the job in 2021 during the COVID-19 pandemic and returned to his native village, Arattupuzha, where he started employment as a fisherman. In 2024, following the release of the film adaptation of his story, actor Prithviraj Sukumaran met with Muhammad, engaging in a conversation about his experiences.

== Representation in media ==
Muhammad's life story is the primary inspiration for:

- Aadujeevitham (2008): A bestselling Malayalam novel by Benyamin. The novel won the Kerala Sahitya Akademi Award for Novel and has been translated into over 30 languages, including the English version titled Goat Days (2012). It is widely studied in Indian and international universities as a seminal work of migrant literature.
- The Goat Life (2024): A survival drama film directed by Blessy, featuring Prithviraj Sukumaran as Najeeb Muhammad. The film's release triggered global interest in Muhammad's story, with international publications like Newlines Magazine analyzing his experience within the broader context of Gulf labor systems.

Muhammad's narrative has been cited by rights groups highlighting the conditions of migrant workers in the region.

== See also ==
- Kafala system
- Migrant workers in the Gulf Cooperation Council region
- Human rights in Saudi Arabia
