= Yamakaathaghi =

2025 Tamil film by Peppin George Jayaseelan

- Theatrical release poster
- Directed by: Peppin George Jayaseelan
- Written by: Peppin George Jayaseelan; S. Rajendran (Dialogues)
- Produced by: Srinivasarao Jalakam; Ganapathi Reddy
- Starring: Roopa Koduvayur; Narendra Prasath
- Cinematography: Sujith Sarang
- Edited by: Sreejith Sarang
- Music by: Jecin George
- Production companies: Naisat Media Works; Arunasree Entertainments
- Release date: 7 March 2025
- Running time: 113 minutes
- Country: India
- Language: Tamil

Yamakaathaghi is a 2025 Indian Tamil-language supernatural thriller film written and directed by Peppin George Jayaseelan. The film stars Roopa Koduvayur and Narendra Prasath in the lead roles.

Yamakaathaghi was released in theatres on 7 March 2025.

== Plot ==
In a village near Thanjavur, the villagers prepare for Kaappu Kattu, a traditional protective ritual for the local temple. The ceremony is overseen by the village leader, Selvaraj (Raju Rajappan), who is known for his strict adherence to customs. His daughter, Leela (Roopa Koduvayur), has suffered from asthma since childhood and frequently clashes with her father over his rigid beliefs.

One evening, a heated argument between Leela and Selvaraj escalates, leading to a moment of violence—Selvaraj, in a fit of rage, slaps her. Deeply humiliated and devastated, Leela retreats to her room. Hours later, she is found dead, having hanged herself. The shocking tragedy leaves the family and villagers in mourning.

However, when preparations for her funeral begin, an eerie phenomenon occurs—Leela's body refuses to move. Despite multiple attempts by her family and the villagers, her corpse remains immobile on the cot. As panic spreads, whispers of supernatural forces and unanswered questions take hold. Is Leela's spirit resisting, demanding justice? Or is there a darker truth behind her death?

As the village is consumed by fear and speculation, Yamakaathagi unfolds as a supernatural thriller, blending psychological tension, eerie suspense, and emotional depth. The film delves into the secrets surrounding Leela's demise, unearthing buried truths that refuse to stay hidden.

== Cast ==
- Roopa Koduvayur as Leela
- Narendra Prasath as Anbu
- Geetha Kailasam as Leela's mother
- Raju Rajappan as Selvaraj
- Subash Ramasamy
- Haritha
- Pradeep Durairaj
- Jaisinth
- Akash Velayutham

== Production ==
In early-October 2022, the first look poster, revealing the title as Yamakaathaghi was announced. The film is written and directed by debutant Peppin George Jayaseelan starring Roopa Koduvayur in her Tamil debut. The film also stars YouTuber Narendra Prasath, Geetha Kailasam, Raju Rajappan, Subash Ramasamy, Haritha and others in important roles. The film is produced by Srinivasarao Jalakam and co-produced along with Ganapathi Reddy under Naisat Media Works in association with Aruna Sree Entertainments banner respectively. The technical team consists of Sujith Sarang as the cinematographer, Sreejith Sarang as the editor and Jecin George as the music composer.

Principal photography took place in the villages surrounding Thanjavur.

== Music ==
Yamakaathaghi

Soundtrack album by Jecin George
- Genre: Feature film soundtrack
- Language: Tamil
- Label: Saregama
- Producer: Jecin George

Jecin George chronology
Charminar (2018)	Yamakaathaghi (2025)

Singles from Yamakaathaghi
- 1. "Uyir Koottula" Released: 1 February 2025; 2. "Silu Silu Sirippai" Released: 1 March 2025

The music is composed by Jecin George. The first single "Uyir Koottula" released on 1 February 2025. The second single "Silu Silu Sirippai" released on 1 March 2025.

Track listing
No.	Title	Lyrics	Singer(s)	Length
1.	"Uyir Koottula"	Gnanakaravel	Gowtham Bharadwaj
2.	"Silu Silu Sirippai"	S. Rajendran	Thanjai Selvi	2:52

== Release ==
=== Theatrical ===
Yamakaathaghi released in theatres on 7 March 2025.

=== Home media ===
It is now streaming on the OTT platform Aha Tamil.

== Reception ==
=== Critical response ===
Anusha Sundar of OTTPlay gave 3/5 stars and wrote "With decent production values, performances and direction, Yamakaathaghi is a no-frills supernatural drama that brings a fresh storytelling to the table. Even as the film might have certain shortcomings, Yamakaathaghi is definitely a film to watch out for, only for its refreshing narration and execution." A critic of Dinamalar gave 2.5/5 stars.

Abhinav Subramanian of The Times of India gave 2/5 stars and wrote "Yamakaathaghi respects the audience's time, concluding before weariness turns into resentment. The rural setting, the parochial characters, themes of caste and honor. Deities and local traditions. A spirit that refuses to leave. It feels like you've seen this stuff too many times." Akshay Kumar of Cinema Express wrote "Yamakaathaghi is a breath of fresh air, both with regard to the novelty given to a horror story and the solutions, however cinematic, to social issues like caste discrimination."
