= Aadujeevitham =

2007 novel by Benyamin

- Author: Benyamin
- Original title: Aadujeevitham
- Working title: Aadujeevitham; The Goat Life
- Translator: Joseph Koyippally
- Illustrator: K Shereef
- Cover artist: K Shereef
- Language: Malayalam
- Genre: Novel, survival, based on true events
- Publisher: Green Books (Malayalam) Penguin Books (English)
- Publication date: 15 July 2008
- Publication place: India
- English publication date: 1 July 2012
- Pages: 255
- ISBN: 978-01-4341-633-3 (English), 978-81-8423-117-5 (Malayalam)
- Preceded by: Abeesagin (Malayalam)
- Followed by: Manjaveyil Maranangal (Malayalam)

Aadujeevitham (English: The Goat Life) is a 2008 Malayalam-language novel by Indian author Benyamin. Its English version is marketed under the title Goat Days. It is about an abused Malayali migrant worker employed in Saudi Arabia as a goatherd against his will.

The novel is based on real-life events and was a best seller in Kerala. According to media, Benyamin became an "overnight sensation" with the publication of this "hard-hitting story" and is currently one of the top sellers in Malayalam. The original Malayalam version of Goat Days has gone through over 100 reprints.

The novel depicts the life of Najeeb Muhammad, an Indian emigrant going missing in Saudi Arabia. Najeeb's dream was to work in the Persian Gulf region and earn enough money to send back home. But, he achieves his dream only to be propelled by a series of incidents into herding goats in the middle of the desert. In the end, Najeeb contrives a hazardous scheme to escape his desert prison. Penguin Books India's introduction describes the novel as "the strange and bitter comedy of Najeeb's life in the desert" and "a universal tale of loneliness and alienation".

The English translation of the novel appeared in the long list of Man Asian Literary Prize 2012 and in the short list of the DSC Prize for South Asian Literature 2013. It won the Kerala Sahitya Akademi Award for Novel for Benyamin in 2009.

== Synopsis ==
The book is divided into four parts (Prison, Desert, Escape and Refuge).

Najeeb Muhammad, a young man from Arattupuzha in Haripad of the Kerala state, is newly married and dreams of a better work in any of the Arab states of the Persian Gulf. After several endeavors, he finally gets an opportunity to work in Saudi Arabia. However, at the King Khalid International Airport, Riyadh he is clueless as what to do next and is taken away by an Arab man who he believes to be his work sponsor. The work sponsor takes him to a cattle farm in the middle of a desert, confirming Najeeb's worst nightmare. The work sponsor hands Najeeb over to the farm supervisor.

Najeeb is then used as a shepherd and is assigned to tend goats, sheep and camels for almost 3 1/2 years in the remote deserts of Saudi Arabia. He is forced to do backbreaking work, kept half-hungry and is denied water to wash and suffers unimaginably. The farm's brutal supervisor keeps Najeeb in control with a gun and binoculars and frequently beats him with a belt. And now Najeeb had to manage this new fate without the bare human essentials.

In a country where he doesn't know the language, places or people, he is far away from any human interaction. Najeeb steadily starts to identify himself with the goats. He considers himself as one of them. His dreams, desires, avenges and hopes starts to fade away as his mindset has now become similar to that of the goats. He talks to them, eats with them, sleeps with them and virtually lives the life of a goat. Although he has tried absconding multiple times, the supervisor catches him every time and punishes him by denying him food and water. He stops absconding when he finds the skeleton of the previous shepherd buried in the sand, who he thought had escaped. Even then, he keeps a ray of hope which will bring freedom and end to his sufferings some day.

Finally one night with the help of Ibrahim Khadiri, a Somali worker in the neighboring farm, Najeeb Muhammad and his friend Hakeem escapes from the horrible life to freedom. But, the trio fumbles across the desert for days, and young Hakeem dies of thirst and fatigue. But Ibrahim Khadiri and Najeeb keep moving on and the stumble across an Oasis where they manage to take rest for a few days. In the day they had planned to start moving again, Ibrahim disappears leaving Najeeb alone. Initially devastated, Najeeb somehow manages to find his way to a nearby highway, where after a day of trying, a kind Arab stops for him and rides him to Al-Bathaa.

Over there, he meets Kunjikka, a fellow malayali who helps refugees. Kunjikka nurses him back to health and finally calls back to his hometown. Once Najeeb started feeling better, he gets himself arrested by the civil police in order to get deported to India with Hameed, who he had met while being with Kunjikka.

In a few weeks, he gets to know that he is being deported to India by the authorities. Feeling ecstatic he bids his goodbye's to his fellow inmates and as he boards the plane.

== Main characters ==
Benyamin about his novel Goat Days

- Najeeb Muhammad, the protagonist of the novel, spent nearly 3 1/2 years (4 April 1992 – 13 August 1995) in a remote farm in the Saudi Arabian desert. Originally a sand miner from Arattupuzha in Haripad, he is given the visa by a Karuvatta-based friend for ₹30,000 (equivalent to ₹250,000 or US$2,600 in 2026) as a helper in a construction company in Saudi Arabia. Najeeb Muhammad is a real life character.
- Hakeem is a young man, who lives a life similar to Najeeb. He joins Najeeb to elope from the desert, however, surrenders before death due to hunger and thirst in their perilous journey through the desert.
- Ibrahim Khadiri
- Arab owner
- Hameed
- Kunjikka
- Sainu[ wife ]

== Inspiration ==
Recounting his meeting with the real-life Najeeb, Benyamin reminisces:

But when I heard his tale, I knew this was the story I was waiting to tell the world and I knew this had to be told. Usually we only hear of stories of success from the Gulf. But I wanted to talk about the many who lead lives of suffering and pain.

The reluctant Najeeb who wanted to forget his past had to be coaxed to recount his story.

== Translations ==
The original book was published by Green Books Private Limited, Thrissur on 15 July 2008. The English translation of the novel for Penguin Books was carried out by Joseph Koyippally, a literature professor in the Central University of Kerala.

Other translations

Language	Title	Translator	Year	Publisher	ISBN
Arabic	ايام الماعز; Ayyāmu l-māʻiz	Suhail Wafy	2015	Maktabat Afāq	9789996659812
Gujarati	ગોટ લાઇફ; Goat Life	Minal Dave, Sandhya Kamla Nayre	2025	Arunoday Prakashan	9788198500595
Nepali	खबुज; Khabuja	Dinesh Kaafle	2015	FinePrint Books	9789937893169
Odiya	ଛ୍ହେଳି ଚରେଇବାର ଦିନ; Chhēḷi carē'ibāra dina	Gourahari Das	2015	Friend's Publication	9789937893169
Thai	มนุษย์แพะ; Manut phæ	Nawara	2012	Bō̜risat Sansakrit Čhamkat	9786167356501
Tamil	ஆடு ஜீவிதம் Aadu Jeevitham	Vilasini	2020	Ethir Veliyeedu	9788194734055

The translations into Kannada and Hindi are due for release.

== Film adaptation ==
Director Blessy had announced that he would be making a film based on the book, titled Aadujeevitham. However, the author noted, "We are still in the discussion stage. Our plans for a film had to be postponed when we realised that its production cost would not be feasible for a Malayalam film. Now we are planning something on a larger scale and Prithviraj Sukumaran will play Najeeb's role." However, in late 2017, Blessy had confirmed the eponymous film adaptation of the book as a Malayalam film. After months of speculation, in January 2018 composer A. R. Rahman confirmed in a press conference that he is making a comeback to Malayalam cinema as a composer with the film. The film released on 28 March 2024.

Tamil film adaptation

The 2013 Indian Tamil-language film Maryan, starring Dhanush, is said to have been inspired by Aadujeevitham.
