= The Last Two Days =

2021 Malayalam language film

- Directed by: Santhosh Lakshman
- Written by: Santhosh Lakshman; Navaneeth Reghu
- Produced by: Suresh Narayan
- Starring: Deepak Parambol; Dharmajan Bolgatty
- Cinematography: Faisal Ali
- Edited by: Vinayan MJ
- Music by: Arunraj; Sejo John
- Release date: 27 May 2021
- Running time: 74 minutes
- Country: India
- Language: Malayalam

The Last Two Days is a 2021 Indian Malayalam language thriller film directed by Santhosh Lakshman. It was released on 27 May 2021 through the OTT platform NeeStream.

== Cast ==
- Deepak Parambol as CI Srikanth Sharma
- Dharmajan Bolgatty
- Nandhan Unni
- Harikrishnan
- Vineeth Mohan
- Aditi Ravi
- Major Ravi as DySP Rajan
- Murali Gopi
- Surjith Gopinath
- Ajmal Zayn
