= Job Kurian =

Indian singer and composer (born 1982)

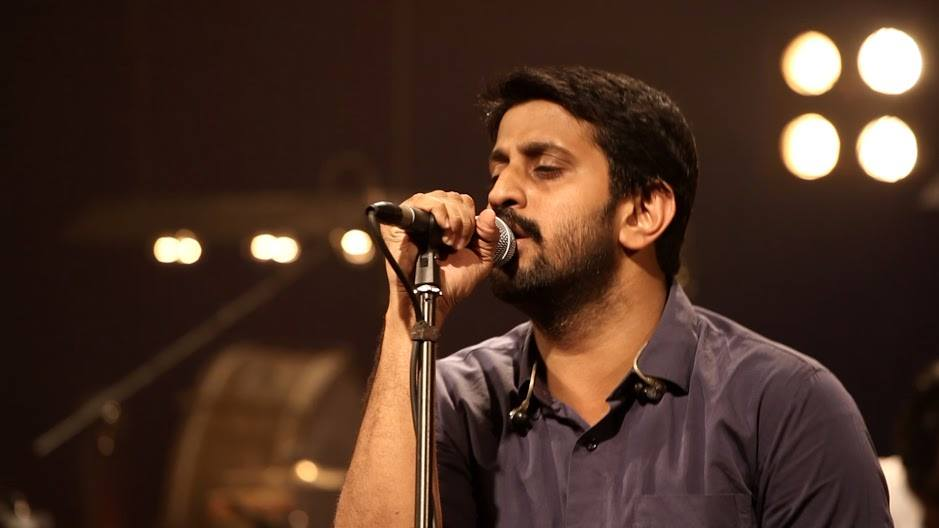
- Born: 29 July 1982 (age 44); Vattiyoorkavu, Trivandrum , India
- Occupations: Singer; composer
- Years active: 2007–present
- Spouse: Athira Job (m. 2012)
- Children: 2

Job Kurian (born 29 July 1982) is an Indian singer and composer who works in both indie music and in Malayalam films. He won the South Indian International Movie Award for Best Male Playback Singer in Malayalam in 2023.

== Early life and education ==
Job Kurian was born in Vattiyoorkavu, Thiruvananthapuram, Kerala, and hails from Alappuzha (Alleppey). He attended St. Shantal, Christ Nagar, and Bhavan's Senior Secondary School, Kodunganoor for schooling. Prithviraj Sukumaran was his schoolmate at Bhavan's. He pursued his B.Tech. at Malanad College of Engineering, Karnataka.

He developed an interest in music from an early age and was influenced by a variety of musical traditions, including folk, contemporary and world music. Over the years, he established himself as both a playback singer in Malayalam cinema and an independent musician, known for blending multiple musical styles while maintaining a distinctive vocal identity.

== Personal life ==
Job married Athira on 10 November 2012 at St. Joseph's Church in Thiruvananthapuram. The couple has two sons, with the first born on 25 April 2014.

== Career ==
Job Kurian first came into public recognition in 2006 after emerging as the runner-up in the reality music competition Super Star, aired on Amrita TV. The platform introduced him to a wider audience and marked the beginning of his professional music career.

Job made his playback singing debut with the song “Aathmavin Kaavil” from the Malayalam film Black Cat, alongside veteran singer K. S. Chithra . His breakthrough came with “Aaranne Aaranne” from the historical film Urumi (2011), composed by Deepak Dev . The song brought him widespread recognition and established him as a playback singer in Malayalam cinema.

Following his breakthrough, Job lent his voice to numerous Malayalam films. Some of his best-known playback songs include “Manikyachirakulla” from Idukki Gold , “Mandaarame”, “Chillu Ranthal”, “Arike Ninna”, “Pakalo Kaanaathe”, and “Kaavalaai Chekavar”, among others. His singing style is recognised for its emotional depth and versatility across different genres.

Alongside playback singing, Kurian developed a significant presence in Kerala’s independent music scene. His original compositions blend elements of folk, alternative folk, world music, contemporary music and pop. His independent works have contributed to the growing popularity of non-film music in Malayalam.

His early independent projects include Thaalam (2008), followed by performances on platforms such as Music Mojo, which helped introduce his original music to a wider audience. Between 2017 and 2020, he released a series of original compositions under the HOPE Project, exploring themes of hope, relationships, humanity and personal experiences.

One of his most recognised independent songs, “Kannodu”, performed with singer Mridula Warrier on Music Mojo, experienced renewed popularity years after its original release when it went viral across social media platforms, introducing the song to a new generation of listeners.

Apart from singing, Kurian expanded his creative work by making his debut as a music director with the Malayalam film Rasam (2015). He has also collaborated with several independent musicians and bands, contributing as a singer, composer and performer across various musical projects.

== Musical style and collaborations ==
Job Kurian’s music is characterised by a blend of folk traditions, contemporary arrangements and world music influences. While he is recognised as a playback singer, much of his work has focused on promoting independent Malayalam music through original compositions and live performances.

Throughout his career, he has collaborated with several musicians and independent artists, including Shankar Tucker , When Chai Met Toast , Ricky Kej , Avial , and Charan Raj, among others. These collaborations have allowed him to experiment with different musical styles while reaching audiences beyond Malayalam cinema.

== Live performances ==
Job Kurian is known for his live performances featuring both film songs and original compositions. His concerts are designed to present a combination of playback music and independent works, often incorporating storytelling and audience interaction.

He has performed extensively across India and has toured internationally in countries including the United Kingdom, Ireland, United Arab Emirates, Australia, United States, and Canada.

Job has also performed at music festivals and cultural events including NH7 Weekender, Ragam, SouthSideStory, Indiegaga, and Oddball Festival, contributing to the visibility of Malayalam independent music on larger platforms

== Filmography ==
Year	Song	Title	Credited as		Notes	Ref.
Year	Song	Title	Singer	Composer	Notes	Ref.
2007	"AathmavinKaaval"	Black Cat	Yes	No	Debut as a playback singer	
2007	"AathmavinKaaval"	Black Cat	Yes	No	Debut as a playback singer	
2009	"Chanjalam"	Ritu	Yes	No		
2011	"Aaranne Aarane"	Urumi	Yes	No		
2012	"Melle Kollum"	22 Female Kottayam	Yes	No		
2012	"Pala Pala"	I Love Me	Yes	No		
2013	"Akaluvathenthino"	Red Wine	Yes	No		
2013	"Manikyachirakulla"	Idukki Gold	Yes	No		
2013	"Innalakale"	Honey Bee	Yes	No		
2013	"Nila Vaname"	English	Yes	No		
2013	"Thaazhe Nee Tharame"	Thira	Yes	No		
2014	"Mandaarame"	Ohm Shanthi Oshaana	Yes	No		
2014	"Vaa Maaro Thammaaro"	Garbhashreemaan	Yes	No		
2014	"Thaane Pookkum"	Sapthamashree Thaskaraha	Yes	No		
2015	"Unaroo"	Nellikka	Yes	No		
2015	"Dhanumasa Palazhi"	Rasam	No	Yes	Debut as a film composer	
2015	"Sarasa Sarasaro"	Rasam	No	Yes	Debut as a film composer	
2015	"Mayamo Marimayamo"	Rasam	Yes	Yes	Debut as a film composer	
2015	"Minnaaminunge"	Nirnayakam	Yes	No		
2015	"Dheera Charitha"	Lord Livingstone 7000 Kandi	Yes	No		
2015	"Hey Neela Vaan"	Ayal Njanalla	Yes	No		
2015	"Saarangiyil"	Yoo Too Brutus	Yes	No		
2016	"Chillu Ranthal"	Kali	Yes	No		
2016	"Mele Mukilodum"	Kochavva Paulo Ayyappa Coelho	Yes	No		
2017	"Aaro Kannil"	History of Joy	Yes	No		
2017	"Aarini Yarini"	Paippin Chuvattile Pranayam	Yes	No		
2018	"Naadottukku"	Kuttanpillayude Sivarathri	Yes	No		
2018	"Thodu Thodu"	Angane Njanun Premichu	Yes	No		
2018	"Appooppan Thaadi"	B.Tech	Yes	No		
2018	"Thaa Thinnam"	Theevandi	Yes	No		
2018	"Melle Mulle"	Mangalyam Thanthunanena	Yes	No		
2019	"Oru Thuruthin"	Thottappan	Yes	No		
2020	"Aaroral"	Maarjaara Oru Kalluvacha Nuna	Yes	No		
2020	"Uyire"	Kuttiyappanum Daivadhootharum	Yes	No		
2021	"Bhoomi Thuranne"	Kannalan	Yes	No		
2022	"Arike Ninna"	Hridayam	Yes	No		
2022	"Pakalo Kaanaathe"	Saudi Vellakka	Yes	No	SIIMA Award for Best Male Playback Singer – Malayalam	
2024	"Vaanara Lokam"	Kishkindha Kaandam	Yes	No		
2025	"Kaavalaai"	Empuraan	Yes	No		
2025	"Nisheedhin"	Karam	Yes	No		
2026	"Amaran"	Prathichaya	Yes	No		
2026	"Maaveerane"	Pallichattambi	Yes	No		
2026	"Nin Ormathan"	Madhuvidhu	Yes	No		
2026	"Innalekal"	Patriot	Yes	No		
2026	"Erunno"	Unmadham	Yes	No		

== Discography ==
Year	Album	Credited as		Notes	Ref.
Year	Album	Singer	Composer	Notes	Ref.
2008	Thaalam	Yes	Yes	Debut as a composer, co-composers: Charan & Yakzan	
2013	Aarente	Yes	Yes	Co-singer: Neha Nair	
2013	Empran	Yes	Yes		
2013	Kaanan	Yes	Yes		
2015	Padayathra	Yes	Yes	Co-singer: Harish Sivaramakrishnan	
2015	Ellaam	Yes	Yes	Job Kurian Collective	
2015	Roots	Yes	Yes		
2015	Poliyo	Yes	Yes	Co-singer: Resmi Sateesh	
2015	Mayamo	Yes	Yes		
2015	Tharaatu	Yes	Yes		
2015	Nilavo	Yes	Yes		
2015	Nenjinneenam	Yes	Yes		
2015	Kannodu	Yes	Yes	Co-singer: Mridula Warrier	
2017	Enthavo	Yes	Yes	1st track of Hope Project	
2018	Parudeesa	Yes	Yes	2nd track of Hope Project	
2018	Mulla	Yes	Yes	3rd track of Hope Project	
2020	Kaalam	Yes	Yes	4th track of Hope Project	
2020	Yennum Yellow	Yes	Yes		
2023	Athe Nila	Yes	Yes	Kappa Originals	
2023	Bhaavam	Yes	Yes		
2024	Daanam	Yes	Yes	Malayalam Daan Utsav Anthem; Co-created with Arun Pullat	
2025	Nizhal	Yes	Yes		
2025	Paalayanam	Yes	Yes		
2025	Dreamland	Yes	No	With When Chai Met Toast	

== Accolades ==
Year	Award	Category	Result	Ref.
2015	Campus Choice Cine Awards	The Most Promising Voice	Won	
2017	Indywood Music Excellence Awards	Youth Icon	Won	
	Vayalar Ramavarma Balabhaskar Yuva Prathibha Award	Yuva Prathibha Award	Won	
2018	Mazhavil Manorama Music Awards	Best Non Film Song - "Enthavo"	Won	
2018	Indywood Music Excellence Awards	Best Independent Musical Project - "HOPE Project"	Won	
2023	South Indian International Movie Awards	Best Male Playback Singer – Malayalam	Won	
2023	Mazhavil Manorama Music Awards	Best Independent Music - "Bhaavam"	Won	
2025	P. Jayachandran Memorial Awards	Face of Independent Music in Kerala	Won	
2025	Resonance Music and Sound Awards	Indie Icon of the Year	Won	
2026	Thikkurissi Film Awards	Best Male Singer	Won	
