= Hemanth Menon =

Indian film actor (born 1990)

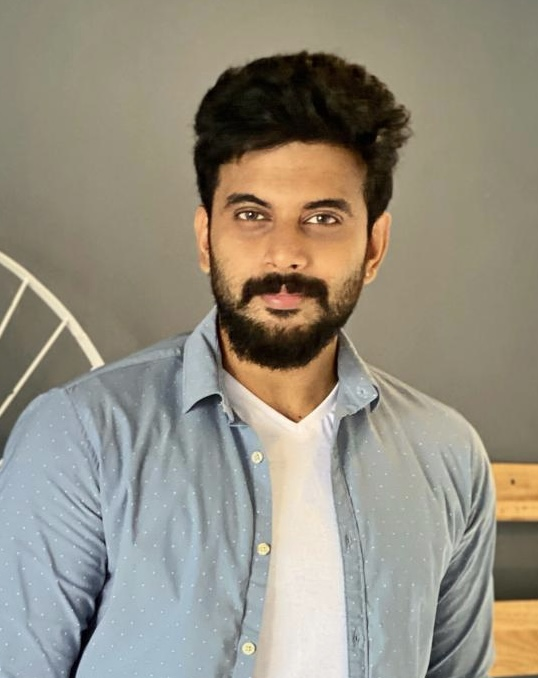
- Hemanth in 2021
- Born: Vineeth Suresh; 19 April 1990 (age 36); Tirur, Malappuram, Kerala, India
- Education: College of Engineering Vadakara
- Occupation: Actor
- Years active: 2011–present
- Spouse: Nilina Nair (m. 2019)
- Parent(s): Suresh Kumar; Usha

Vineeth Suresh (born 19 April 1990), better known by his stage name Hemanth Menon, is an Indian actor who predominantly works in Malayalam movies.

== Career ==
He made his debut in 2010 with the film Living Together. He has since performed in Doctor Love (2011), Ordinary (2012), Chattakkari, Chapters and Thomson Villa.

== Filmography ==
Year	Title	Role	Notes
2011	Living Together	Hemachandran	Debut Movie
2011	Doctor Love	Roy Mathews	
2012	Ordinary	Devan	
2012	Chattakaari	Sasi	
2012	Ayalum Njanum Thammil	Jojo	
2012	Chapters	Anwar	
2013	Tourist Home	Jojo	
2014	Thomson Villa	Xavi	
2014	Central Theater	Sidharth Vijay	
2014	Actually	Deepak	
2015	Nirnnayakam	Anand Chandrasekharan	
2017	Gold Coin	Nihal	
2017	Oduvil	-	Musical Album
2017	Bobby	Ajay	
2017	Pokkiri Simon	Jomon	
2018	Charminar	Anand	
2018	369	Sanjay	
2019	Kantharam	Siddhu	
2019	Thenkashikattu	Shiva	
2020	Joshua	Arjun	
2022	Senora	Benny	Short film
2022	Salute	Guest appearance	
2022	Grandma	John	Tamil film
2023	Thee Ivan	Shiva	Tamil film
2024	Ezhuthola	Devan	
2024	Oru Smartphone Pranayam		
2025	Ouseppinte Osyath	Roy	
