= Roshan Sebastian =

Indian singer (born 1997)

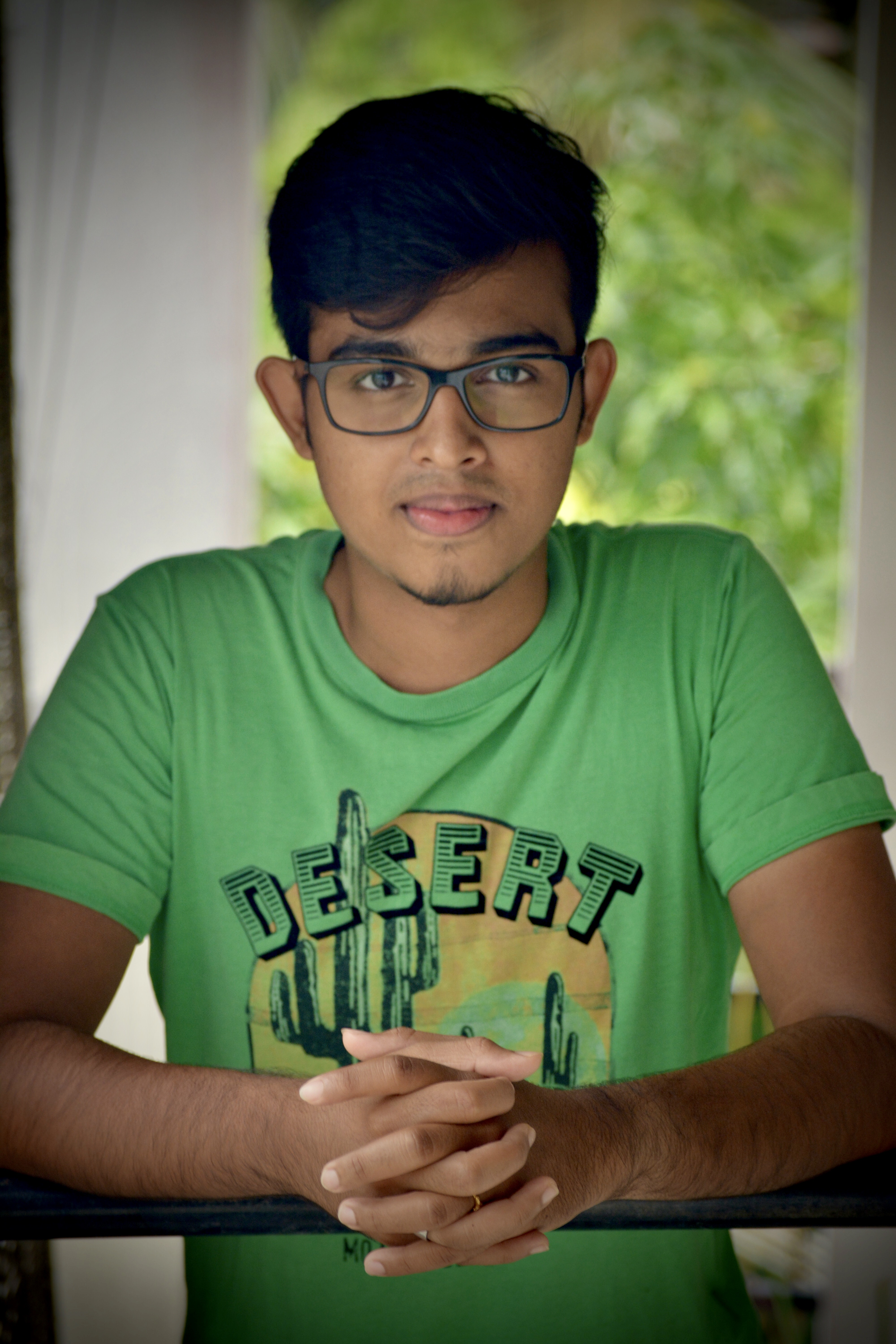

Roshan Sebastian is an Indian independent musician. He was awarded, The Expressive Singer, in Airtel Super Singer Junior Season 1, which premiered in February 2007 to July 2007. He was also the Runner Up In Vijay TV Airtel Super Singer Junior Season 2, which premiered from 21 June 2009 to 17 June 2010.

== About Roshan Sebastian ==
Roshan Sebastian, born on 19 June 1997 in Kannur, Kerala, is the son of K.D. Sebastian and Mini Sebastian. His mother tongue is Malayalam, but he has spent the majority of his life in Tamil Nadu, first in Coimbatore and currently in Chennai. In 2007, he gained recognition by winning the 'Best Expressive Singer' award in Airtel Super Singer Junior Season 1.

He completed his graduation from Loyola College, Chennai, in 2018. He has studied Hindusthani vocals under Shri Kuldeep Sagar, achieving a Senior Diploma, and has also trained in piano with Shri Sadanandam, a guitarist associated with renowned music director Ilayaraja. Following his graduation, he pursued a course in Music Production and Audio Engineering under Shri Hentry Kuruvila, who has worked as a programmer for A.R. Rahman. As of now, Roshan is active as a Music Producer and Audio Engineer in the film industry.

== Career ==
He entered Airtel Super Singer Junior Season 1 in the year, 2007, and became the semi-finalist and was awarded Best Expressive Singer. Followed by that in the year, 2008, he participated in Gandharva Sangeetham in Kairali TV and became the first runner up and received Yesudas Award from the legend Dr.K. J. Yesudas. In the year, 2009, he again participated in Vijay TV Airtel Super Singer Junior (season 2) and was among the top 5 finalists. He is also nicknamed as Paadum Ilaya Nila — the senior paadum nila being none other than legendary S. P. Balasubrahmanyam. In June 2021, he lend his vocals for a Telugu music video "Daare Leda", composed by Vijai Bulganin, written by KK and featuring Satyadev and Roopa Koduvayur. It is produced by Nani. The music video was released in Tamil as "Vaanam Thoandraadhoa".

== Achievements ==
- Roshan won second place in Kairali Gandharva Sangeetham competition and received "Yesudas Award" from the legend Dr.K. J. Yesudas.
- In the semi-finals of Airtel Super Singer Junior 1, Roshan was awarded "Best Expressive Singer".
- Roshan was among the top 3 finalists on Airtel Super Singer Junior 2
- He is also nicknamed as "Paadum Ilaya Nila"—the senior paadum nila being none other than legendary SP Balasubramaniam.
