= Krishnabhaskar Mangalasserri =

Indian screen writer

- Born: 2 November 1973 (age 52); Kollam, Kerala, India
- Education: University of Madras
- Occupations: Actor and Model, Writer
- Years active: 2012–present
- Spouse: Laxmy Krishnabhaskar
- Children: 2

Krishnabhaskar Mangalasserri is an Indian actor, model, academic, novelist, and screenwriter who works in the Malayalam film industry. He made his acting debut in the Malayalam film Puthiya Theerangal (2012) and later starred in the movie American-born Confused Desi (ABCD). He co-wrote and played a lead role in the movie Asha Black.

== Early life and career ==
Krishnabhaskar was born in Kollam as the son of a police officer and school teacher in the year 1973. He was actively involved in school plays and drama. After his MBA he started working in ad agencies in Chennai and then in Dubai.

He started modeling as one of his activities by facing the camera for brands like Musli power, Malayala Manorama, Sharon PVC pipes etc. He debuted into cinema with a cameo role in the Sathyan Anthikad film Puthiya Theerangal. Then came the film American-born Confused Desi (ABCD) directed by Martin Prakkat. He also acted in two short films – the yellow pen directed by Jude Anthany Joseph, and in the short film Scene contra. He is also the global head of Aster Volunteers from December 2016 to December 2020 in the CSR and philanthropy department of Aster DM Healthcare Dubai. He co wrote the Malayalam film Asha Black as a dialogue associate and also did a full-length role. He cofounded Digifaktory along with Sandeep varma and Gokulnath, a cinema marketing company in the year 2014. In 2019 he wrote and directed a short feature film Innaleyolam.

In April 2016 he published his debut novel(April 2016) in Malayalam.

== Filmography ==
=== As actor ===
Year	Title	Role	Notes
2012	Puthiya Theerangal	KP's Son	Debut movie as actor in cameo
2013	American-born Confused Desi (ABCD)	Professor	
2014	Asha Black	Ram	Also co-writer; bilingual film
2014	Nee Naan Nizhal	Ram	Also co-writer; bilingual film
2020	Member Rameshan 9aam Ward	Alpesh sha	
2020	Myavu	Udayan	

=== As writer ===
Year	Film	Role	Notes
2012	Asha Black	Co-writer	
