= Arjun Lal =

Indian actor

- Occupation: Actor
- Years active: 2005; 2014; 2022–present
- Known for: Thanmathra (2005)

Arjun Lal is an Indian actor who works in Malayalam films. He is best known for his role in Thanmathra (2005) for which he won the Kerala State Film Award – Special Mention.

== Career ==
As a child actor, Arjun Lal made his debut as Mohanlal's son in Thanmathra (2005). Regarding his performance, a critic wrote that he "is the scene stealer and has the making of a good actor". He then took a hiatus from acting to finish his education. He made his comeback as a lead with Asha Black (2014) in which he played a musician from a band in Bengaluru co-starring R. Sarathkumar. Regarding his performance, a critic wrote, "Arjun Lal can be proud of his persuasive voice, apart from that he doesn't hold much promise for the future, as his presence, despite being the lead, is remembered for a completely ill-fitting hair style". He co-wrote the film Dear Friend (2022) with the duo Suhas-Sharfu, which was partly autobiographical about his life in Bengaluru while he was studying for an MBA. Regarding his writing and performance, a critic wrote that he has "penned a soothing friendship story filled with nostalgia, idiosyncrasies, laughter, fear, anxiety, tears and camaraderie" and that he amongst the ensemble cast made his character persuasive.

== Filmography ==
Key
†	Denotes film or TV productions that have not yet been released

- All films are in Malayalam, unless otherwise noted.

Year	Title	Role	Notes	Ref.
2005	Thanmathra	Manu Ramesh	Won—Kerala State Film Award – Special Mention; Won—Asianet Film Award for Best Male New Face of the Year	
2014	Asha Black	Rohit	Simultaneously shot in Malayalam and Tamil	
2014	Nee Naan Nizhal	Rohit	Simultaneously shot in Malayalam and Tamil	
2022	Dear Friend	Arjun	Also screenwriter	
2024	Varshangalkku Shesham	Christy		
2026	Anomie	Alby		
