= Jecin George =

- Occupation: film composer
- Website: jecingeorgemusic.com

Jecin George is an Indian film score composer who works in Malayalam and Tamil films.

== Career ==
Although his parents were against him pursuing a career in music, he won the Squarehead band remix competition and his track was given a worldwide release. He worked as a programmer for the Malayalam films Traffic (2011) and Bachelor Party (2012) before assisting Gopi Sunder. He made his debut with the bilingual Asha Black (2014).

== Discography ==
=== Original scores ===
| Year | Malayalam | Tamil | Ref. |
|---|---|---|---|
| 2014 | Asha Black | Nee Naan Nizhal | |
| 2018 | Charminar | | |
| 2018 | Kaitholachathan | | |
| 2019 | Kantharam | | |
| 2025 | | Yamakaathaghi | |

=== As a playback singer ===
| Year | Song | Film | Language | Notes | Ref. |
|---|---|---|---|---|---|
| 2012 | "Ayalathe Veettile" | Matinee | Malayalam | As playback singer; His own rendition | |
| 2014 | "Pandan Nayude" | Beware of Dogs | Malayalam | | |
| 2018 | "The Rhythm of Dance" | Lakshmi | Tamil; Telugu (dubbed) | Also additional programmer and electric guitarist | |
