= Anomie (film) =

2026 Indian Malayalam crime thriller film

- Theatrical release poster
- Directed by: Riyas Marath
- Written by: Riyas Marath
- Screenplay by: Riyas Marath
- Story by: Riyas Marath
- Produced by: Bhavana; Dr Roy CJ; Aadith Prassana Kumar; Abhishek Pathak; Kumar Mangat Pathak
- Starring: Rahman; Bhavana; Shebin Benson; Binu Pappu; Arjun Lal; Vishnu Agasthya; Drishya Raghunath
- Cinematography: Sujith Sarang
- Edited by: Kiran Das
- Music by: Harshavardhan Rameshwar
- Production companies: Bhavana Film Productions; Panorama Studios; Blitzkrieg Films; APK Cinemas
- Release date: 6 February 2026
- Running time: 152 minutes
- Country: India
- Language: Malayalam

Anomie is a 2026 Indian Malayalam crime thriller film written and directed by Riyas Marath in his directorial debut. The film stars Rahman and Bhavana in the lead roles, alongside Shebin Benson, Binu Pappu, Arjun Lal, Vishnu Agasthya and Drishya Raghunath.It is produced by Bhavana, Roy C J, Adit Prasanna Kumar, Ram Mirchandani, Rajesh Menon, and Masood TP under the banners of Bhavana Film Productions, Blitzkrieg Films, Panorama Studios, and APK Cinemas.

== Plot ==
Zaara, a forensic officer, lives with her younger brother Ziyan, who has been undergoing psychiatric treatment following the deaths of their parents. One day, Ziyan disappears and is later found dead at the same location where their parents died. Because of his history of depression and previous suicide attempt, his death is ruled as suicide.

Zaara becomes suspicious after discovering inconsistency in the case, including a voice message Ziyan sent hours prior his recorded time of death and traces of propofol in his body. She connects his death to several other supposed suicides that share similar circumstances including presence of same drug and tyre marks at the crime scenes.

ACP Ghibran on the other hand, reopens his investigation, and discovers that the psychiatric records had been illegally sold to a man named Prasad. Their investigation eventually leads to Sanjay Hegde, a neuroscientist research Near-Death experiences and the preservation of consciousness after death which he termed "Equation of Death".

Sanjay is captured after a confrontation with the police near a windmill location. Evidence found in his basement laboratory links him to his deaths. During interrogation, he admits that the victims were abducted and "used" for science, as human subjects in experiments involving near-death experiences. He also reveals that Zaara's boyfriend Alby had been his accomplice.

It is subsequently revealed that Zaara had already discovered Alby's involvement and killed him to avenge her brother's death. The film ends Zaara meeting with Ghibran, who returns Ziyan's cat Bella to her before she leaves.

== Cast ==
- Bhavana as Zaara Philip
- Rahman as ACP Mohammed Ghibran IPS
- Shebin Benson as Ziyan Philip
- Binu Pappu as Sr. Forensic Surgeon Shanmugan
- Arjun Lal as Alby
- Vishnu Agasthya as Prasad
- Drishya Raghunath as Jessy Paulose
- Sumit Naval as Sanjay Hegde

== Production ==
The film marks the directorial debut of Riyas Marath, who had previously co written films such as Neeli and Diwanji Moola Grand Prix. The project was developed as a crime thriller centered on an investigative narrative.

The film was produced by Bhavana, Adit Prasanna Kumar, Abhishek Pathak, and Kumar Mangat Pathak, with Rajesh Menon, Ram Mirchandani, Masood TP and Nitin Kumar serving as co-producers. Masood TP also served as executive producer, while Abhinav Mehrotra was the creative producer.

Cinematography was handled by Sujith Sarang, and editing was carried out by Kiran Das. The background score was composed by Harshavardhan Rameshwar, marking his debut in Malayalam cinema.

== Release ==
Anomie was released theatrically on 6 February 2026, after being postponed from an earlier scheduled date of 30 January.

=== Streaming rights ===
The streaming rights of the movie were acquired by Amazon Prime Video on 24 July 2026 and also acquired by Lionsgate Play on 27 August 2026.

== Reception ==
Anomie received negative reviews from critics. Writing for The Hindu, the reviewer noted that the film relied heavily on familiar genre elements, which limited its impact despite an ambitious premise.

The Indian Express described the film as a routine crime thriller that felt overstretched, while acknowledging the performances of the lead cast.

A review by The News Minute praised Bhavana’s performance and the central idea, while criticising the screenplay for lacking depth.

A review in The Hollywood Reporter India titled the film "an inconsistent thriller that’s neither personal nor a procedural".

Onmanorama wrote: "Bhavana steadies an uneven psychological thriller."

India Today stated that the film suffered from "flawed execution" in its review.

OTTplay stated that "Bhavana-Rahman's thriller is well-made but with moments in which the plot falters."

The Times of India published a reviewed the film as an "Uneven Psychological Thriller Driven by Mood, Not Story."

The New Indian Express described the film as a "sleek, ambitious crime thriller stretched too thin" in its review.

== Box office ==
The film opened with worldwide collections of approximately ₹23 lakhs on its first day. By the second day, total collections rose to around ₹48 lakhs, indicating moderate growth during the opening weekend,it was a box office flop
