= Dear Friend (2022 film) =

2022 Malayalam film

- Directed by: Vineeth Kumar
- Written by: Suhas-Sharfu; Arjun Lal
- Produced by: Shyju Khalid; Sameer Thahir; Ashiq Usman
- Starring: Tovino Thomas; Darshana Rajendran; Basil Joseph; Arjun Radhakrishnan; Arjun Lal
- Cinematography: Shyju Khalid
- Edited by: Deepu Joseph
- Music by: Justin Varghese
- Production companies: Happyhours Entertainment; Ashiq Usman Productions
- Release date: 10 June 2022
- Country: India
- Language: Malayalam

Dear Friend is a 2022 Indian Malayalam-language thriller film directed by Vineeth Kumar. The film stars Tovino Thomas, Darshana Rajendran, Basil Joseph, Arjun Radhakrishnan and Arjun Lal. The film was released on 10 June 2022, and was a box office failure.

== Plot ==
Six friends (Vinod, Jannath, Arjun, Shyam, Sajith and Amutha) are celebrating Vinod's birthday. Vinod is dared to wear a homemade superman costume while roaming the city.

While celebrating in a club, the group get into a physical altercation with a passer-by who was livestreaming Vinod in the costume without his consent, leading to their arrests. The police officer mocks Vinod's tattoos, one of which reads '‘AMMA’' in Malayalam. Vinod is slapped by the interrogating officer for retaliating. Embarrassed by this, he tells Jannath that this was his most memorable birthday.

Jannath struggles to be accepted by her conservative father, who disapproves of her relationship with Arjun; knowing that they won't get his blessing, the couple have a courthouse wedding. Arjun, Vinod, Shyam, and Sajith are aiming to earn financial backing for a health-based app that they are developing. While Shyam comes from a well-off family, he does not wish to join his family business of running a pub. Sajith comes from a financially struggling family; his minimal English and lack of social skills make it difficult for him to find job interviews.

One night, while the group are partying at a club, Arjun spikes Vinod's drink, leading to Vinod, who was abstaining from alcohol that day due to his mother's death anniversary, shoving him. After leaving the club, he is followed by Amutha who confesses her love for him, however he does not reciprocate.

Later on, Vinod visits Jannath at the medical practice she works in, and confesses to having many unresolved feelings about his mother's death. The pair have a heartfelt conversation. One morning, the group are unable to find Vinod who has left behind a letter revealing that he doesn't want to be searched and thanks them for the memories they created. Jannath initially believes that Vinod is playing a joke and is simply getting revenge on them for humiliating him on his birthday. However, the group are visited by police officers who take them in for questioning, and it becomes clear to the group that the situation is serious.

The police suspect Vinod of being a thief, claiming that he has stolen ₹70 lakhs from a company he previously worked for. Jannath believes that the whole situation must be a misunderstanding, and Shyam is angered at being deceived by his alleged business partner.

The group learn that Vinod did not record pieces of music that he claimed were his, and find out about many lies he had told them. They then go to Mumbai and meet the original musician, Sreenath, who reveals the truth. Vinod and Sreenath were roommates, and Vinod had helped Sreenath, who was unable to cope after his mother had died after battling cancer, through registering him on a matrimonial website. He then suddenly disappeared, and the following morning, the police question Sreenath about stolen money.

The group then discover that Vinod's mother is in fact alive, and due to Vinod's estrangement from her, she believes that he is dead. However, after having failed to locate Vinod; they return home and carry on with their lives. Things eventually become better for the group: Jannath and Arjun are expecting a baby, Sajith secures a well-paying job, and Shyam has taken over his family business.

One day, Sajith spots Vinod parking a car on a street. He calls Jannath, Arjun, and Shyam, however the latter is still upset at Vinod, however Jannath and Arjun agree to meet Sajith at the spot where he saw Vinod. They wait until late at night for Vinod to reappear, and follow him to an apartment complex. Sajith, Arjun, and Jannath confront Vinod, who reveals that he is the run from the police, who are still searching for him. He also reveals that he lied about his mother's death to hide his past. Jannath asks Vinod about whether he is lying about his identity; to which Vinod points to the ‘Mother’ tattoo on his arm, claiming that the same story works every time.

== Cast ==
- Tovino Thomas as Vinod
- Darshana Rajendran as Jannath
- Basil Joseph as Sajith
- Arjun Radhakrishnan as Shyam
- Arjun Lal as Arjun
- Sanchana Natarajan as Amutha
- Rekha as Vijayakumari Viswanathan
- Vishak Nair as Shyam's brother
- Jaffar Idukki as Jannath's father
- Assim Jamal as Shyam's lawyer
- Hakim Shahjahan as Sreenath

== Production ==
The film's story is inspired by Arjun Lal's experiences in Bengaluru.

== Reception ==
Anna M. M. Vetticad of Firstpost wrote, “Dear Friend is matter of fact yet intriguing, and the finale is nicely open-ended. “ She ranked it tenth on her year-end list of best Malayalam films for the publication. Cris of The News Minute wrote that "But for the abruptness of the ending which makes you feel a little cheated, the film is a cosy and engaging watch". S. R. Praveen of The Hindu wrote that "Filmmaker Vineeth Kumar's second outing has an interesting premise, but what the film serves in the end — after all the painful work of building the suspense — is quite disappointing". Anjana George of The Times of India said that "Dear Friend is for those who cherish intimate friendships as an important part of the fabric of their life. Letting go, giving space and accepting individuals the way they are also part of bonding". Sajin Srijith of The New Indian Express opined that "Dear Friend is one of those films that should inspire young aspiring filmmakers who think out of the box because this is a work that screams simplicity".
