= Roopa Koduvayur =

Indian actress

- Born: 27 December 2000 (age 25); Vijayawada, Andhra Pradesh, India
- Education: MBBS
- Alma mater: Katuri Medical College, Guntur
- Occupation: Actress
- Years active: 2020–present

Roopa Koduvayur is an Indian actress who appears in Telugu films. She is a recipient of the SIIMA Award for Best Female Debut for her performance in Uma Maheswara Ugra Roopasya (2020).

== Early life and career ==
Roopa Koduvayur was born on 27 December 2000 in Vijayawada, India. She is a doctor by profession and has a MBBS degree from Katuri Medical College. She is also trained in Kuchipudi and Bharatanatyam. Roopa made her feature film debut in Uma Maheswara Ugra Roopasya (2020), which gained her critical and audience applause. She has then signed her first Tamil film Yamakaathagi.

== Filmography ==
Key
†	Denotes films that have not yet been released

Year	Title	Role	Notes	Ref.
2020	Uma Maheswara Ugra Roopasya	Jyothi	SIIMA Award for Best Female Debut – Telugu	
2023	Mr. Pregnant	Mahi		
2025	Yamakaathaghi	Leela	Tamil film	
2025	Sarangapani Jathakam	Mythili Vemuri		
2026	Neelira	Thamizhini	Tamil film	

=== Music video ===
Year	Title	Performers	Notes
2021	"Daare Leda"	Vijai Bulganin, Roshan Sebastian, KK	Co-featuring Satyadev
