= Yennum Yellow =

2020 EP released by Kerala Blasters

EP by Various Artists
- Released: 19 November 2020
- Recorded: October 2020
- Genre: Rock, Rap
- Length: 13:30
- Label: Manorama Music
- Producer: Kerala Blasters FC

Yennum Yellow (English: Always Yellow) is an EP produced by Kerala Blasters as a tribute to its fans. It is the first ever musical album released by an Indian Super League club as a dedication to their fans. The album was released on 19 November 2020, a day before the start of 2020–21 ISL season in collaboration with Manorama Music through various streaming services. The songs on the album are inspired by Kerala's passion towards football and the fanbase of Kerala Blasters.

== Background ==
Yellow is the primary colour of Kerala Blasters and the club's main identity. The album was released by the Blasters as part of the Yellow Heart Initiative. Its title Yennum Yellow translates into English as Always Yellow which is a tagline used by the club and its supporters. The club also announced that the album consisting of 6 music tracks is dedicated to the passionate fans of the club across the globe who would be missed at the stands during the 2020–21 Indian Super League season. The tracks of the album are deeply rooted in the fans, culture and the club of Kerala. It has contribution of famous musicians from Kerala. The cover art of the album was designed by local visualist Saju Mohanan.

== Track listing ==
No.	Title	Writer(s)	Singer	Length
1.	"Theekkali"	Job Kurian	Job Kurian	2:17
2.	"Kaalthaalam"	Manu Manjith	Agam	1:10
3.	"We Are Kerala Blasters"	Shabareesh Varma; Niranj Suresh	Niranj Suresh	2:37
4.	"Komban Nira"	rZee	rZee	2:28
5.	"Shakti"	Saju Sreenivas	Saju Sreenivas	3:11
6.	"Va Varika Va"	Nikhil Thomas; Manjith	Shabareesh Varma	1:47
Total length:				13:30

== See also ==
- Kerala Blasters FC
- Manjappada
