= Actually (film) =

- Film poster
- Directed by: Shine Kurian
- Written by: Shine Kurian
- Starring: Hemanth Menon; Aju Varghese; Sreenivasan; Sneha Unnikrishnan; Anjali Aneesh; Bhagath Manuel; Chembil Ashokan
- Cinematography: James Chris
- Edited by: Mendoz Antony
- Music by: Kilimanoor Ramavarma; Gopu Krishna P.S
- Production company: Right Turn Films
- Distributed by: Right Turn Release
- Release date: 5 December 2014
- Country: India
- Language: Malayalam

Actually is a 2014 Malayalam-language Indian feature film written and directed by Shine Kurian, starring Hemanth Menon, Aju Varghese, Sneha Unnikrishnan, Anjali Aneesh, and Bhagath Manuel with veteran actors Sreenivasan and P. Balachandran in important characters.

== Summary ==
Actually is the story of Sanu and Gopalakrishnan and their unexpected involvement in two different incidents. A group of youngsters also gets involved in the happenings. Sanu is forced to fight for his rights along with his family when he realizes that his life is in tatters.

== Cast ==
- Hemanth Menon as Deepak
- Aju Varghese as Blog Kavi Saji
- Sreenivasan as Sanu
- Sneha Unnikrishnan as Priya
- Anjali Aneesh as Roopa
- Bhagath Manuel as Vinay
- P. Balachandran as Gopalakrishnan
- Chembil Ashokan as Shivan
- James Pottackal as Short Film Producer (Cameo)
- Jayakrishnan as Managing Director
- Lishoy as Deepak's Father
