= Ouseppinte Osiyathu =

2025 Indian-Malayalam language film

- Theatrical release poster
- Directed by: Sarath Chandran R. J.
- Screenplay by: Fazal Hassan
- Produced by: Edward Anthony
- Starring: Vijayaraghavan; Dileesh Pothan; Kalabhavan Shajohn; Hemanth Menon
- Cinematography: Arvind Kannabiran
- Edited by: B. Ajithkumar
- Music by: Songs: Sumesh Parameswar; Akshay Menon; Background Score: Akshay Menon
- Production company: Maygoor Films
- Distributed by: Central Pictures
- Release date: 7 March 2025
- Running time: 119 minutes
- Country: India
- Language: Malayalam
- Budget: ₹4 crore

Ouseppinte Osiyathu (transl. Ousepp's Will) is an Indian Malayalam-language drama film directed by debutant R. J. Sarath Chandran and written by Fazal Hassan. It stars Vijayaraghavan, Dileesh Pothan, Kalabhavan Shajohn, Hemanth Menon, Kani Kusruti and Zarin Shihab. It is produced by Edward Anthony under the banner Maygoor Films. Arvind Kannabiran handles the cinematography and editing by B. Ajithkumar. Sumesh Parameswar composed a song and Akshay Menon composes the background score and a song.

Ouseppinte Osaiyathu was released in theaters on 7 March 2025.

== Plot ==
Ousepp, a wealthy, aging patriarch and money-lender who is also quite miserly and maintains a tyrannical grip over the lives of his three adult sons Michael, George and Roy.

Michael, the eldest son is a Tehsildar, who is vulnerable and burdened by duty and feels stifled by his father's control. He is married to Annie and has a daughter. George, the second son is the town CI, who is more pragmatic but equally troubled and financially dependent on his father. Roy, the youngest son is passionate about social causes and unemployed, often a source of annoyance for his family.

Michael and George are struggling financially due to a failed construction business venture and are desperately seeking monetary help from their father, who is reluctant to part with his wealth. One night in asking money from their father at his place, George accidentally kills Roy who was escaping the place as a robber. In a moment of panic and emotional turmoil, Michael and Geroge both decide to cover up the event.

After a few days, Ousepp passes away. As Roy does not show up to the funeral and cannot be found, inquiries start. Also, Ousepp's will leaves all his wealth to Roy. In a fit of guilt, Michael shares the incident with Annie. The subsequent investigation led by a sharp cop, expose the pre-existing fissures in the family relationships: the strained bond between the two brothers, Michael's fractured marriage and the deep-seated, unspoken resentments stemming from their childhood and Ousepp's controlling, unloving parenting. In the end, Michael takes the blame of the accidental murder and provides the location of the body to the police.

== Cast ==
- Vijayaraghavan as Vattakandathil Ousepp
- Dileesh Pothan as Michael V. Ousepp, Ousepp's elder son
- Kalabhavan Shajohn as C. I. George V. Ousepp, Ousepp's second son
- Hemanth Menon as Roy V. Ousepp, Ousepp's youngest son
- Kani Kusruti as Dhanya
- Zarin Shihab as Anjali
- Lena as Annie, Michael's wife
- Anjali Krishna as Treesa
- Joji Mundakayam as Vattakandathil Paappy "Kochayi", Ousepp's younger brother
- Sajadh Bright as Scariyappi
- James Eliya as Varghese
- Jordi Poonjar as Selvan
- Bitto Davis as Prathapan Nair
- Appunni Sasi as Karthavu
- Ajeesh Jose as Vinayan
- Vasudevan R. V. as Adv. Thevally
- Tintu Raveendran as Sony
- Edward Anthony as S. P. Tony Tharakan IPS
- Habeeb Khan as Fr. Charles
- Chaaru Chandana as Jennifer
- Sreerang Shine as Peter
- Tijo Thomas as Member Thomas

== Production ==
Principal photography began in July 2024 near Elappara. The filming continued at Kuttikkanam, Vagamon, Peermade and Vyttila and wrapped up in October 2024.

== Music ==
Ouseppinte Osiyathu

Soundtrack album by Sumesh Parameswar Akshay Menon
- Released: 4 March 2025
- Recorded: 2024–25
- Genre: Feature film soundtrack
- Language: Malayalam
- Label: Maygoor Films

The film's songs were composed by Sumesh Parameswar and Akshay Menon. The background score was composed by Akshay Menon. The first single Veyilu Chaayum was released on 4 March 2025.

No.	Title	Lyrics	Music	Singer(s)	Length
1.	"Veyilu Chaayum"	B. K. Harinarayanan	Sumesh Parameswar	Jithin Raj	3:39
2.	"Kaaval Neeye"	B. K. Harinarayanan	Akshay Menon	Suraj Jagan

== Release ==
=== Theatrical ===
The official trailer of the film was released on 25 February 2025. The film was released in theatres on 7 March 2025.

=== Home media ===
The film's digital streaming rights were acquired by Amazon Prime Video and ManoramaMAX. It began streaming from 1 May 2025 on Amazon Prime Video for rent and then starts to stream free for subscribers from 9 May 2025 on both Prime Video and ManoramaMAX.

== Reception ==
Ouseppinte Osiyathu received positive reviews from critics.

Vivek Santhosh of The New Indian Express gave 3/5 and wrote "Ouseppinte Osiyathu is less about the crime at its centre and more about the weight of unspoken guilt, the power dynamics within a fractured family and the suffocating nature of long-held grievances. It may not cater to those expecting high-stakes twists and turns, but for viewers willing to immerse themselves in its emotional intensity, the film offers a rewarding experience despite the missteps in the former hour." Gopika I. S. of The Times of India gave 3/5 and wrote "Ouseppinte Osiyathu is a powerful, thought-provoking film that could have been even more impactful with some narrative tightening." Divya P. of OTTPlay gave 3/5 and wrote "Dileesh Pothan and Kalabhavan Shajohn drive this film with their layered performances, resting hugely on Fazal Hassan's writing. Though the key plot point looks jarring and raises some questions, Ouseppinte Osiyathu quickly moves past it to deliver a fairly engaging film." Pricy Alexander of Malayala Manorama wrote "'Ouseppinte Osiyathu' balances suspense and emotion in a high-range setting."
