= Deepak Parambol =

Indian actor (born 1988)

- Born: 1 November 1988 (age 37); Kannur, Kerala, India
- Occupation: Actor
- Years active: 2010–present
- Known for: Malarvadi Arts Club
- Spouse: Aparna Das (m. 2024)

Deepak Parambol (born 1 November 1988) is an Indian actor who appears in Malayalam films in supporting roles to character roles. He made his acting debut in Malarvaadi Arts Club (2010), directed by Vineeth Sreenivasan.

He is notable for his roles in Thattathin Marayathu (2012), Thira (2013), D Company (2013), Kunjiramayanam (2015), Ore Mukham (2016), The Great Father (2017), Ottamuri Velicham (2017), Rakshadhikari Baiju Oppu (2017), Vishwa Vikhyatharaya Payyanmar (2017), Captain (2018), B tech (2018), Ormayil Oru Shishiram (2019) and An International Local Story (2019).

== Career ==
Parambol made his debut in Vineeth Sreenivasan's Malarvady Arts Club (2010), a role that he bagged after responding to an advertisement in a local newspaper. He has played minor, supporting and main roles in his career spanning a decade. In his lead role for Ormayil Oru Shishiram, he lost 10 kilograms to look like a school-going teenager for a part of the movie.

== Filmography ==
Year	Title	Role	Notes
2010	Malarvaadi Arts Club	Rameshan	Debut
2012	Thattathin Marayathu	Manoj	
2013	Thira	Deepak	
2013	SIM	Karthik	
2013	Olipporu	Clutch	
2013	D Company	Kuppi Simon	Segment: Gangs of Vadakkumnathan
2014	John Paul Vaathil Thurakkunnu	John Paul	
2015	Kunjiramayanam	Sasi	
2015	You Too Brutus	Hero at the hospital	Cameo
2015	Nellikka	Balu	
2015	Loham	Anwar Shiyaz	Cameo
2016	Vettah	Rony Varghese	
2016	Ore Mukham	Prakashan	
2016	Chithrakatha	Hari	
2017	The Great Father	CI Shafeer	Cameo
2017	Rakshadhikari Baiju Oppu	Manoj	
2017	Ottamuri Velicham	Chandran	
2017	Vishwa Vikhyatharaya Payyanmar	Gopikrishnan	Debut as lead actor
2017	Overtake	Balu	
2018	Captain	U. Sharaf Ali	
2018	B tech	Nizar	
2019	Ormayil Oru Shishiram	Nithin	
2019	An International Local Story	Mahesh	
2019	Ilayaraja	Muneeb	
2019	Love Action Drama	Man at Party	Cameo
2019	Manoharam	Rahul	
2020	Bhoomiyile Manohara Swakaryam	Ahmmedkutty/Ammatty	
2021	Instagramam	Kaliyedathu Suku	Web Series
2021	Kutsitham	Deepak	Short film
2021	The Last Two Days	C.I Sreekanth	OTT Release
2022	John Luther	Felix	
2022	Heaven	Fabiyan John	
2022	Ullasam	Arun Mathew	
2022	Malayankunju	Sumesh	
2022	19 (1) (A)	Ismail Ibrahim	OTT Release
2023	Christopher	SI Mohammed Ismail	
2023	Kasargold	Vishnu	
2023	Kannur Squad	Riyas	
2023	Imbam	Nidhin Samuel	
2024	Manjummel Boys	Sudhi	
2024	Varshangalkku Shesham	Shakespeare Shekharan	
2024	Sookshmadarshini	Antony	
2024	Jananam 1947 Pranayam Thudarunnu		
2025	Ponman	Markandeya Sharma	
2025	Sarkeet	Balu	
2025	Soothravakyam		
2025	Mirage	Prakash	
2026	Kasaragod Embassy	Vivek	
2026	Varavu		

== Personal life ==
Deepak married actress Aparna Das on 24 April 2024.
