= Beware of Dogs =

- Film poster
- Directed by: Vishnu Sivaprasad
- Written by: Vishnu Sivaprasad
- Produced by: Rajeev Menon
- Starring: Siju Wilson; Sekhar Menon; Sanju Sivram; Sreenath Bhasi
- Cinematography: Mahesh Raj
- Edited by: Shyam Sashidharan
- Music by: Bijibal; Jecin George (2 songs)
- Production company: Orizon Creations
- Release date: 20 June 2014
- Country: India
- Language: Malayalam

Beware of Dogs is a 2014 Indian Malayalam-language comedy drama film written and directed by Vishnu Sivaprasad. The plot follows four bachelors nicknamed Dogs by their house owner, Dominic, Oomen, Gautam, and Sunny. It stars Siju Wilson, Sekhar Menon, Sanju Sivram, and Sreenath Bhasi.

== Plot ==
The movie starts off with Thulsiandan Pillai introducing himself, his wife, Radhika, and his daughter, Meera, who studies at the General Engineering college in the area. When a sound comes from above, Thulsi explains it to be the "Dogs". Dominic has many offers from the US but is stuck with his girlfriend, Tina, who threatens that if he dumps her she will commit suicide. He avoids her calls by saying he is in a meeting and always says he's thinking of a business. He lives with Oomen who is a waiter at a bar, Gautam a singer and guitarist who works at a bar, and Sunny a women's perfume addict. Sunny uses his knowledge in the perfume field to seduce women. This leads to Thulsi putting up a warning board saying "Beware of DOGS".

Oomen, upon receiving a job in Pondicherry, leaves. Thulsi is relieved. Soon after Oomen leaves, Gautam resigns from his job because his manager does not pay him enough, but in turn loses his guitar. Gautam mourns over the loss of his guitar and calls Omanakuttan, a wealthy friend. He asks if he can buy a new guitar for him. Omanakuttan, in response, overloads him with money.

In the night, Gautam receives a suicide text from Omanakuttan. Reaching there, they realise that he has consumed two bottles of sleeping pills. Hurrying him to the hospital, he is saved. Omanakuttan comes to stay with them, forcing Thulsi to draw back the "O" in beware of dogs, he also makes the "O" fat to show how fat Omanakuttan is.

During this period, Thulsi says to Dominic that if he does not move out or pay the rent, he will have to tell Baptist. Dominic is puzzled by who it is but is convinced that it is a thug. He goes upstairs and narrates whatever happened downstairs. Gautam is shocked at first and says that he knows this "Thug".

A few months ago, he came to the bar he was working in. He has a drink and pays for it in "Baptist" money. When the bar waiter enquires about the person on the note, he is beaten up by his thugs. But Gautam relives the group by saying Baptist won't take these silly cases. The rest of the plot follows.

== Cast ==
- Siju Wilson as Dominic
- Sekhar Menon as Omanakuttan
- Sanju Sivram as Gautam
- Sreenath Bhasi as Sunny
- Abhirami Suresh as Meera
- Jasmin Bhasin as Meghna
- Aditi Ravi as Teena
- Sunil Sukhada as Thulaseedharan Pillai
- Manoj K. Jayan as Baptist
- Bobby Simha as Amir
- Koottickal Jayachandran

== Soundtrack ==
The music is composed by Bijibal.

- Pandan Nayude - Jecin George, Deepak Dev
- Marimukil - Niranj Suresh
