= B.Tech (film) =

B. Tech
- Theatrical release poster
- Directed by: Mridul Nair
- Written by: Ramakrishna J. Kulur; Mridul Nair
- Produced by: Sheen Helen
- Starring: Asif Ali; Anoop Menon; Aju Varghese; Sreenath Bhasi; Deepak Parambol; Alencier Ley Lopez; V. K. Prakash; Aparna Balamurali; Arjun Ashokan; Niranjana Anoop
- Cinematography: Manoj Kumar Khatoi
- Edited by: Mahesh Narayanan; Abhilash Balachandran
- Music by: Rahul Raj
- Production company: MAQTRO Motion Pictures
- Distributed by: MAQTRO Motion Pictures; Homeland Cinemas (overseas)
- Release date: 5 May 2018 (Kerala)
- Running time: 146 minutes
- Country: India
- Language: Malayalam

B. Tech is a 2018 Indian Malayalam-language coming-of-age drama film directed by Mridul Nair (in his directorial debut). The film stars Asif Ali, Arjun Ashokan, Anoop Menon, Aju Varghese, Alencier Ley Lopez, V. K. Prakash, Aparna Balamurali, and Niranjana Anoop.

B.Tech was released on 5 May 2018 and received positive reviews. The film completed a run of more than 100 days in Kerala theaters.

== Plot ==
Azad joins for a B. Tech course in Bangalore where he is met by seniors. Out of them, Anand, a carefree B.Tech. student from a very affluent family saves him from ragging. He finds accommodation in the college hostel and stays with Anand and his friends. They enjoy their days in college. Anand and his friends don't care about their academics, but Azad is more of a studious kind and passes all exams with good marks. He falls in love with Ananya, Anand's cousin, and she eventually reciprocates. One day, they both decide to go to Garuda Mall together and just when Ananya decides to disclose her love to Azad, he is killed in a bomb blast in front of the mall.

Anand and the rest of the gang, especially Ananya, are devastated after knowing what happened and a case is filed in the police station. The Karnataka State Police proclaims that the incident was a suicide terrorist attack planned and executed by Azad and tries to close the investigation. Anand and his friends are monitored closely by the police. The police even arrest Nizar Ahmed, Abdu, Sayid Ali, and Lazer, Anand's friends, in the context of them being Muslims. Knowing that Azad and their friends were not terrorists, Anand and his friends do not accept the police's explanation. They decide to put their engineering skills to use and design various gadgets that help them fight against the police in order to prove them wrong. They even organise protests in the name of Azad to honour him. Adv, Vishwanath Iyer, Anand's uncle helps them in their mission as well.

The police, however, refuse to accept that their claims about Azad and the others were false and continue to fight in court. Eventually, using the devices that they had designed, Anand and his friends manage to gather enough evidence to prove the police wrong, but as he is about to submit the evidence, he is attacked critically by a few goons sent by the lead officer investigating the case. In the end, Vishwanath and Anand submit the evidence in court and finally win the case, thereby proving Azad and the others' innocence and delivering justice to Azad.

== Cast ==
- Asif Ali as Anand Subramaniam
- Arjun Ashokan as Azad Muhammad, Ananya's love interest
- Anoop Menon as Adv. Viswanath Iyer
- Sreenath Bhasi as Jojo Mathew
- Deepak Parambol as Nizar Ahmad
- Saiju Kurup as Prasanth P. P.
- Shani Shaki as Abdu
- Aparna Balamurali as Priya Varma
- Niranjana Anoop as Ananya Viswanath, Anand's cousin and Azad's love interest
- Alencier Ley Lopez as Sayid Ali
- Jaffar Idukki as Lazer
- Subeesh Sudhi as Kuttan
- V. K. Prakash as Jayaram (Neighbour)
- Aju Varghese as Professor Manoj Abraham
- Jayan Cherthala as Subramaniam Iyer
- Neena Kurup as Smitha Iyer
- Harish Raj as DCP Ramkumar Naik IPS
- Sooraj Harris as Naik's Assistant 1
- Vijesh as Naik's Assistant 2
- Rama Srinivasan as Ananya's grandmother
- Dinesh Prabhakar as Joseph
- Jayaprakash Kuloor as the Ustad
- Chitra Iyer as Priya's mother
- Anjali Nair as Azmiya, Azad's sister
- Arshiya Gupta as Ummukulsu, Azad's sister
- Krishnamoorthy as Principal Sundar Reddy
- YV Rajesh As Advocate Rama Moorthi
- Manobala as Mano
- Swaminathan as Doctor France
- Arjun R Ambat as Priya's brother
- Ann Saleem
- Sandeep Menon as Sandeep Issac
- Mridul Nair as a cameo appearance
- Renji Panicker as Judge's Voice

== Production ==
B. Tech is the feature directorial debut of advertisement filmmaker Mridul Nair, and is produced by MAQTRO Motion Pictures, after their successful movies like C/o Sairabanu & Sunday Holiday According to Mridul Nair, the film is inspired by several real incidents and the story has been in his mind for eight years. The film was extensively shot in Bangalore. Some of the college scenes were shot at MET's School of Engineering, Mala, Thrissur. The film went on to run for 100 days in theatres.

Dispute during production

During the shooting of the film, Bengaluru witnessed ugly scenes after the junior artists playing cop roles reportedly lathicharged the lead actors leading to a halt in filming.

== Music ==
Btech (Original Motion Picture Soundtrack)

Soundtrack album by Rahul Raj
- Released: 17 April 2019
- Genre: Feature film soundtrack
- Length: 17:57
- Language: Malayalam
- Label: Joii Music
- Producer: Rahul Raj

The music was composed, arranged, and produced by Rahul Raj. Several critics hailed the music as a major highlight of the film.

Btech (Original Motion Picture Soundtrack)
| No. | Title | Lyrics | Singer(s) | Length |
|---|---|---|---|---|
| 1. | "BTech - Theme Song" | Rahul Raj | Shekhar Menon | 1:16 |
| 2. | "Ore Nila Ore Veyil" | B. K. Harinarayanan | Nikhil Mathew | 4:02 |
| 3. | "Peda Glass" | Vinay Govind, Vinayak Sasikumar | Jassie Gift, Jyotsna Radhakrishnan, Kavya Ajit | 3:15 |
| 4. | "Azadi" | B. K. Harinarayanan | Niranj Suresh | 3:06 |
| 5. | "Ya Illahi" | Nasir Ibrahim K. | Zia Ul Haq | 3:24 |
| 6. | "Appoppan Thaadi" | B. K. Harinarayanan | Job Kurian | 2:51 |
| Total length: | | | | 17:57 |

Btech (Original Background Score)

Film score by Rahul Raj
- Released: 2 June 2021
- Genre: Background score
- Length: 29:44
- Label: Maqtro
- Producer: Rahul Raj

An album containing the background score for the film was released separately by Maqtro in 2021. It contains instrumental pieces composed by Rahul Raj.

Btech (Original Background Score)
| No. | Title | Length |
|---|---|---|
| 1. | "Fresher's Day Vibe" | 1:02 |
| 2. | "Jerry and Gang Intro" | 1:01 |
| 3. | "Anand and Gang Theme" | 1:12 |
| 4. | "Azad Intro Theme" | 1:34 |
| 5. | "Ragging" | 1:20 |
| 6. | "Big Brothers - Anand Theme" | 1:22 |
| 7. | "Gang at the Theater" | 1:03 |
| 8. | "Party Tickets" | 1:14 |
| 9. | "Brotherhood" | 1:17 |
| 10. | "The Break Up" | 1:53 |
| 11. | "Gang Fights" | 1:05 |
| 12. | "Azad Theme" | 1:11 |
| 13. | "Naik Meets the Gang" | 1:09 |
| 14. | "The Break Up 2" | 1:15 |
| 15. | "Anand Hits Azad" | 1:04 |
| 16. | "Budding Romance - Ananya's Crush" | 1:06 |
| 17. | "Unfortunate Incidents" | 1:10 |
| 18. | "Torture" | 1:10 |
| 19. | "Mourning" | 1:22 |
| 20. | "Unending Trials" | 1:09 |
| 21. | "The Saving Evidence - The Saving Lead" | 1:01 |
| 22. | "Hacking" | 1:01 |
| 23. | "The Fatal Attack" | 1:23 |
| 24. | "Final Justice" | 1:28 |
| Total length: | | 29:44 |

== Reception ==
Malayalam daily Malayala Manorama appreciated the film for its good mixture of college campus life and sensitive contemporary issues, while also praising Rahul Raj's music. The Times of India praised the film giving it a 3/5 rating, praising the music, while criticizing some comedy scenes "which seemed forced in". Mathrubhumi gave a mixed review with a rating of 2.5/5, but dubbed the work of Mahesh Narayanan and Abhilash Balachandran in editing, and the music by Rahul Raj as "major plus points".
