= Mridul Nair =

Indian film director and actor

Mridul Nair is an Indian film artist who primarily works in the Malayalam film industry. He is known for his work as a director, writer, and actor.

== Filmography ==
Year	Title	Role	Notes
2017	Adventures of Omanakuttan	Shiva's Henchman	
2018	B Tech		Director, Writing (Screen Play) and Actor
2020	Ghar Se		Director
2022	Nna Thaan Case Kodu	Akash Kunjikannan	
2022	Thattum Vellattam		Director
2023	Kasargold		Director and Writing (Dialogue, Story, Screen Play)
2025	Anpodu Kanmani		
2025	Oru Jaathi Jathakam		
