= Joshua (2020 film) =

- Directed by: Peter Sunder Dhas
- Written by: Peter Sunder Dhas
- Starring: Master Abel Peter; Priyanka Nair; Hemanth Menon; Dinesh Panicker
- Cinematography: S Lawell
- Edited by: Ratheesh Mohan
- Music by: Gopi Sundar
- Production company: The Alive Media
- Distributed by: The Alive Media; NNG Films
- Release date: 28 February 2020
- Running time: 108 minutes
- Country: India
- Language: Malayalam

Joshua is a 2020 Indian film made in Malayalam-language, directed by Peter Sunder Dhas starring Master Abel Peter and Priyanka Nair. The principal photography of the film began on 5 September 2019 and the film was released on 28 February 2020.

== Summary ==
Joshua is a psychological film that shows the impact of the medium of cinema on the minds of children and how it affect their lives.

== Cast ==
- Master Abel Peter as Joshua
- Priyanka Nair as Annie
- Hemanth Menon as Arjun
- Anu Tressa
- Dinesh Panicker
- Anand
- Manka Mahesh
- Feby Tharakan
- Anil Pappan
- Rajkumar
- Thirumala Ramachandran
- Alex Koyipurath
- Anju Nair

== Production ==
First time director Peter Sunder Dhas was backed by the production house The Alive Media to make a film based on a psychological subject. Actress Priyanka Nair and child actor Abel Peter were signed for the film. Later, actors Hemanth Menon and Dinesh Panicker joined the film that was shot at the locations of Thiruvananthapuram and Varkala. Interestingly the first look poster of director Gautham Vasudev Menon's film with the same title was released around the same time creating a confusion. Miss South India contestant Anu Tressa also was signed to play the romantic pair of Hemanth Menon. Gopi Sundar was assigned for the songs and background score.
