= Blessy =

Indian director and screenwriter (born 1963)

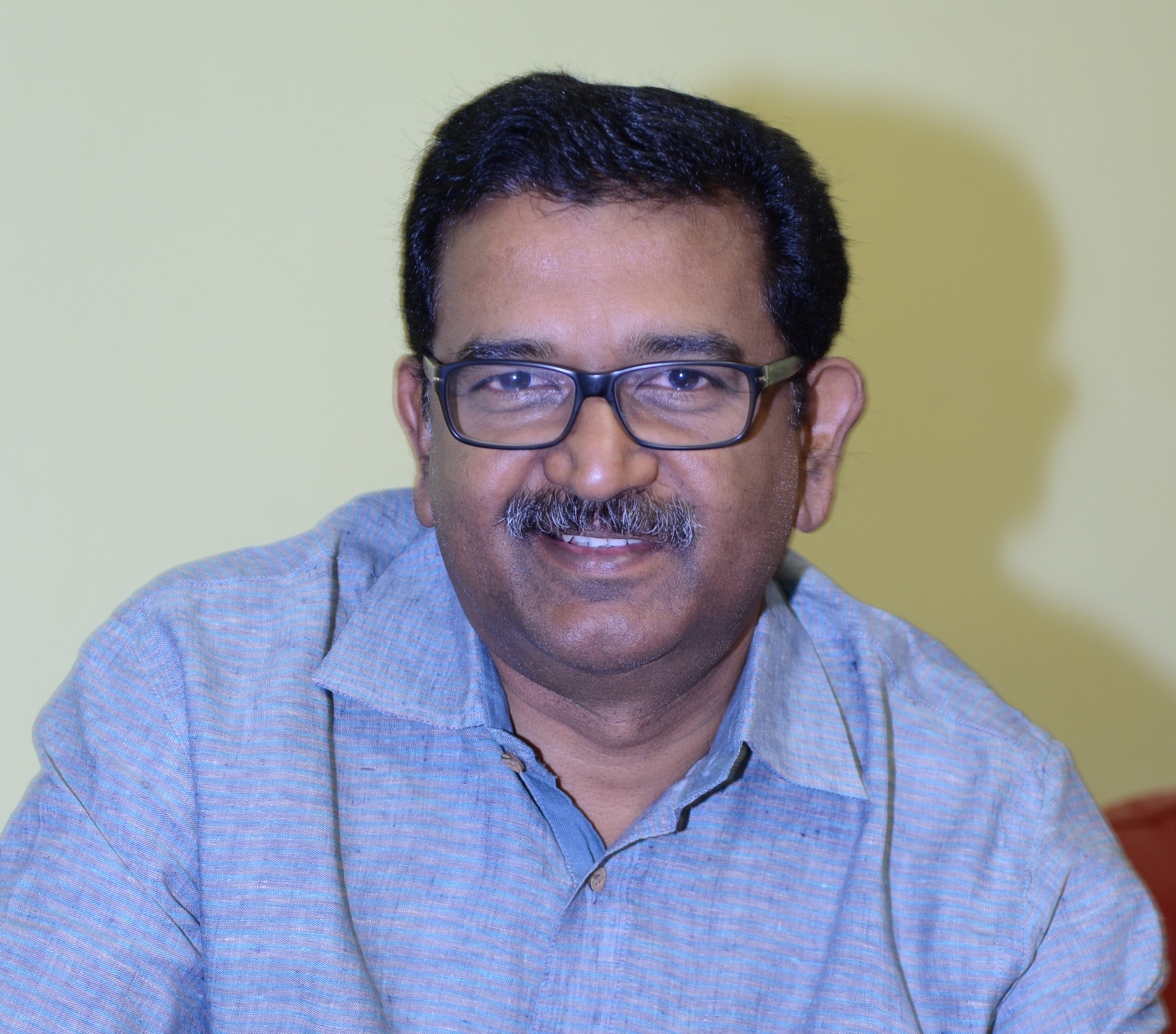
- Born: Blessy Ipe Thomas; 3 September 1963 (age 63); Thiruvalla, Kerala, India
- Education: Mar Thoma College, Tiruvalla
- Occupations: Film director; screenwriter
- Years active: 1986–present
- Spouse: Mini
- Children: 2
- Awards: National Film Awards; Kerala State Film Awards

Blessy Ipe Thomas (born 3 September 1963), best known mononymously as Blessy, is an Indian film director and screenwriter who works in Malayalam cinema. He has won one National Film Awards, three Filmfare Awards South and nine Kerala State Film Awards for his feature films Kaazhcha (2004), Thanmathra (2005), Pranayam (2011) and Aadujeevitham (2024). 100 Years of Chrysostom (2018) received the Guinness World Record for the longest documentary in the world, with a runtime of 48 hours and 10 minutes. His most recent release was his dream project, Aadujeevitham (2024).

== Early life and family ==
Blessy was born on 3 September 1963 in Thiruvalla, Kerala, India. He was the youngest of six children born to Benny Thomas and Ammini Thomas. He lost his parents at a very young age. He studied at Mar Thoma School, SCS High School and Mar Thoma College in Thiruvalla.

Blessy is married to Mini and has two children, Adith and Akhil.

== Career ==
Blessy worked as an assistant director with filmmakers such as Padmarajan, Lohithadas and Jayaraj. He scripted and directed his debut film Kaazhcha in 2004. Kaazcha portrayed the story of an orphaned boy, a victim of Gujarat earthquake and how he changes the life of a small-town film operator (played by Mammootty) and his family. The film won three Kerala State Film Awards including Best Debut Director, Best Film with Popular Appeal and Aesthetic Value, and Best Actor (Mammootty).

His second film was Thanmathra (2005), which depicted the story of a middle-class government employee (played by Mohanlal) and his family, and portrayed the effects of Alzheimer's disease on his life and his family. The film won Blessy National Award for the Best Feature Film in Malayalam and five Kerala State Film Awards including Best Film, Best Director, Best Screenplay and Best Actor (Mohanlal).

Blessy's next venture had Mammootty in Palunku (2006), followed by Calcutta News (2008), starring Dileep and Meera Jasmine, went on to be marginal hits. Bhramaram (2009), which had Mohanlal once again in the lead role was another successful film. It was a story of revenge against those that falsely accused a man of murder and ruined his life. His 2011 film Pranayam includes Mohanlal, Anupam Kher, and Jaya Prada. His 2013 film Kalimannu starring Swetha Menon and Biju Menon in leading roles dwelled upon the theme of childbirth and the maternal and paternal connect towards a child. Menon's labor was shot live in the film.

He directed a biopic documentary film titled 100 Years of Chrysostom (2018) based on the life of Christian prelate Philipose Mar Chrysostom Mar Thoma. Beginning in 2015, it took two years to complete filming. A public screening was held for five consecutive days. With a runtime of 48 hours and 10 minutes, the film received the Guinness World Record for the longest documentary in the world. The film is narrated by Mohanlal. His latest film Aadujeevitham (2024) was a survival drama based on the novel Goat Days by Benyamin. It starred Prithviraj Sukumaran in the lead role and had music composed by A. R. Rahman. Development for the film began in 2008 and the film's production lasted for more than 6 years, mainly due to the COVID-19 pandemic.

== Filmography ==
=== As screenwriter and director ===
Year	Title	Notes
2004	Kaazhcha	
2005	Thanmathra	
2006	Palunku	
2008	Calcutta News	
2009	Bhramaram	
2011	Pranayam	
2013	Kalimannu	
2018	100 Years of Chrysostom	48-hour documentary film
2024	The Goat Life	Adaptation of the novel Aadujeevitham

=== As actor ===
- Easan (2010) as Karupusamy, Poorani and Easan's father
- Best Actor (2010) as himself for a Reality show judge panel

== Awards and nominations ==
Award	Year	Category	Movie	Notes
National Film Awards	2005	Best Feature Film in Malayalam	Thanmathra	
Kerala State Film Awards	2024	Best Director	Aadujeevitham	
Kerala State Film Awards	2024	Best Screen Play (Adapted)	Aadujeevitham	
Kerala State Film Awards	2024	Best Film with Popular Appeal and Aesthetic Value	Aadujeevitham	
Kerala State Film Awards	2011	Best Director	Pranayam	
Kerala State Film Awards	2005	Best Director	Thanmathra	
Kerala State Film Awards	2005	Best Screen Play	Thanmathra	
Kerala State Film Awards	2005	Best Film	Thanmathra	
Kerala State Film Awards	2004	Best Film with Popular Appeal and Aesthetic Value	Kaazhcha	
Kerala State Film Awards	2004	Best Debut Director	Kaazhcha	
Filmfare Awards South	2011	Best Director	Pranayam	
Filmfare Awards South	2005	Best Director	Thanmathra	
Filmfare Awards South	2004	Best Director	Kaazhcha	
Asianet Film Awards	2005	Best Director	Thanmathra	
Asianet Film Awards	2004	Best Film	Kaazhcha	

=== Other awards ===
- 2006: Kalavedi International Prathibha Award Best Film Maker – Thanmathra
- 2005: Kalavedi International Prathibha Award Best Film Maker – Kaazhcha
- 2005: 15th Ramu Kariat Award - Kaazhcha
