= Thanmathra =

- DVD cover
- Directed by: Blessy
- Screenplay by: Blessy
- Based on: "Orma" by Padmarajan
- Produced by: Raju Mathew
- Starring: Mohanlal; Meera Vasudevan; Arjun Lal
- Cinematography: Sethu Sriram
- Edited by: Raja Mohammed
- Music by: Mohan Sithara
- Production company: Century Films
- Distributed by: Century Release
- Release date: 16 December 2005
- Running time: 160 minutes
- Country: India
- Language: Malayalam

Thanmathra (English: Molecule) is a 2005 Indian Malayalam-language drama film written and directed by Blessy and starring Mohanlal, Meera Vasudevan and Arjun Lal. Based on Padmarajan's short story "Orma", it portrays the effects of Alzheimer's disease on the life of Ramesan Nair (Mohanlal) and his family. The film collected three times its budget at the box-office and had a 150-day theatrical run. It is considered as one of the greatest performances by Mohanlal.

Thanmathra won five Kerala State Film Awards, which includes the Best Film, Best Actor, Best Director, Best Screenplay, and a Special Mention Award for the debutant actor Arjun Lal. It also won the Best Feature Film in Malayalam Award at the 53rd National Film Awards.

== Plot ==
Ramesan Nair is a Kerala government secretariat official, cocooned in his own small and happy world. An honest and sincere man, Ramesan's family consists of his loving wife Lekha, son Manu who is a plus-two student, and daughter Manju, a primary school student. His biggest ambition is to see his son becoming an IAS (Indian Administrative Service) officer, something he himself had failed to achieve despite being a brilliant student. Manu is a very loving son and an intelligent student who shares a strong emotional bond with his father.

Ramesan starts to develop problems with his memory. What starts as commonplace omissions and absentmindedness, quickly grows into handicapping cognitive and behavioral impairments.

The first time we notice this is when Ramesan misplaces a very important office file at his home, inside the refrigerator. One day he arrives in office after buying a bag of vegetables and starts behaving as if he had reached home after his office hours. He begins acting strangely in the office, as if he has lost his sense of time and place. He is taken to the doctor by his family and close friend, Joseph.

In the hospital, Ramesan is diagnosed with Early onset Alzheimer's disease, a disease which causes a gradual loss of memory and cognitive abilities. The news comes as a huge shock for the happy family and turns their world upside down. The family is devastated by the sad news, but tries to adjust to the situation with a lot of determination underscored by strong emotional bonds. How they cope up with the trauma, insecurity and uncertainty caused by Ramesan's plight, forms the gist of the movie.

== Cast ==
- Mohanlal as Ramesan Nair, a government employee suffering from Alzheimer's disease
- Meera Vasudevan as Lekha. Ramesan's wife
- Arjun Lal as Manu Ramesh Nair IAS, Ramesan Nair's son
- Baby Niranjana Vijayan as Manju Ramesh Ramesan nair daughter
- Nedumudi Venu as Ramesan's father
- Jagathy Sreekumar as Joseph
- Innocent as Sukumaran Nair, Lekha's father
- Manka Mahesh as Lekha's mother
- Prathap Pothan as Doctor
- Seetha as Swarnam, Ramesan Nair's childhood friend
- Lakshmipriya as Ramesan Nair's co-staff
- Nandhini as Rameshan's neighbour's daughter
- Souparnika subhash as Sabeena

== Soundtrack ==
Thanmathra

Soundtrack album by Mohan Sithara
- Released: 25 November 2005
- Studios: Revi's, Thrissur
- Genre: Film
- Length: 28:19
- Label: Manorama Music
- Producer: Century Films

Mohan Sithara chronology
Rappakal (2005)	Thanmathra (2005)	The Don (2006)

The music of this movie is composed by Mohan Sithara and the lyrics by Bharathiyar (Kaatru Veliyidai) and Kaithapram. Song mixing was done by Renjith Viswanathan.

Track	Song title	Singer(s)	Other notes
1	"Ithaloornnu"	P. Jayachandran	Raga: Kalyani
2	"Mindathedi"	M. G. Sreekumar, Sruthi	
3	"Mele Vellithingal"	Karthik	Raga: Maand
4	"Ithaloornnu"	Mohanlal	Raga: Kalyani
5	"Mindathedi"	Sujatha	
6	"Kaatru Veliyidai"	Vidhu Prathap, Sheela Mani, Dr. Unnikrishnan, Sunil	Raga: Valachi; This is a famous poem by Bharathiyar. The classical lyrics is by Kaithapram

== Reception ==
A critic from Sify wrote, "Thanmatra is an intelligent, insightful and unconventional film. It is a touching, thought-provoking drama for sophisticated audiences". A critic from webindia123 wrote, "It is a beautifully made film sure to touch the hearts of the people who see it".

== Box office ==
The film was commercial success at the box office.

== Awards ==
National Film Awards

- Best Feature Film in Malayalam (Producer) - Raju Mathew

Kerala State Film Awards

- Best Film (Producer) - Raju Mathew
- Best Director - Blessy
- Best Actor - Mohanlal
- Best Screen Play - Blessy
- Special Mention Award - Arjun Lal

Filmfare Awards South

- Best Actor - Mohanlal
- Best Director - Blessy

Asianet Film Awards

- Best Actor - Mohanlal
- Best Director - Blessy
- Best Supporting Actor -Nedumudi Venu
- Best Male Playback Singer : M. G. Sreekumar
- Best Female New Face of the Year - Meera Vasudevan
- Best Male New Face of the Year - Arjun Lal
- Special Jury Award - Jagathy Sreekumar
- Best Child Artist - Baby Niranjana

Vanitha Film Awards

- Best Actor - Mohanlal
- Best Director - Blessy

Kerala Film Critics Awards

- Most Popular Actor - Mohanlal

Amrita Film Awards

- Best Film (Producer) - Raju Mathew
- Best Director - Blessy

Mathrubhumi Film Awards

- Best Actor - Mohanlal

Kerala Film Audience Council Awards

- Best Actor - Mohanlal

J.C. Foundation Awards

- Best Actor - Mohanlal
- Best Director - Blessy
- Best Child Artist - Baby Niranjana

Kala Keralam Award

- Best Actor - Mohanlal

National Film Academy Award

- Best Actor - Mohanlal
