= Charminar (2018 film) =

- Directed by: Ajith C. Logesh
- Written by: Ajith C. Logesh
- Produced by: Sirajudheen KP
- Starring: Ashwin Kkumar; Hemanth Menon; Harshika Poonacha
- Cinematography: Faisal V. Khalid
- Edited by: Ratheesh Mohan
- Music by: Jecin George
- Release date: 9 March 2018 (India)
- Running time: 120 min
- Country: India
- Language: Malayalam

Charminar is a 2018 Indian Malayalam-language crime drama film written and directed by Ajith C. Logesh and produced by Sharmi Sirajudheen. The film stars Ashwin Kkumar and Hemanth Menon along with Harshika Poonacha.

== Plot ==
It's a love story set in the world of the fashion and advertisement industries. The story starts with Sethu who is calling his friend Anand for a confession before his suicide. Anand was an ad filmmaker and Sethu is a fashion designer, through Sethu, Nanda also became a part of ad films and pursues a great career. Sethu loves Nanda but Nanda cheats Sethu by creating a fake story. Later, Sethu calls Anand and tells him that he is going to kill Nanda and he is in hotel Charminar. Anand promises Sethu to be there in 20 minutes. Anand comes out of Nanda's room in hotel Charminar, as he is her boyfriend. We then find out Sethu was cheated by Nanda according to Anand's plan. Anand bravely goes out of the room without being in sight of Sethu so Sethu misunderstands somebody else as Nanda's boyfriend and kills him. Sethu brings Nanda at gunpoint and when Nanda tried to escape, he hits her and she becomes unconscious. When Sethu calls Anand to inform this, Anand by mistake throws his phone in her room and Sethu now knows that Anand is her boyfriend. Sethu and Anand then fight, but Nanda now conscious unfortunately shoots Anand by mistake. Sethu then mentally taunts Nanda as he leaves the room. Immediately after, Sethu hears a silenced gunshot and realizes Nanda committed suicide. He then pays an employee as they both bravely erase all the evidence such as fingerprints and cctv footage, finally leaving hotel Charminar.

== Cast ==
- Ashwin Kkumar as Sethu
- Hemanth Menon as Anand
- Harshika Poonacha as Nanda
- Sirajudeen as William Joy
- Guinness Manoj as Hotel employee

== Production ==
Principal photography began on 3 October 2017 in Bengaluru, The main locations of the film were Bengaluru, Madurai and Kochi.

== Soundtrack ==
No.	Title	Lyrics	Singer(s)
1.	Neelashalabhame	Joffy Tharakan	Gayathri Suresh, Sachin Warrier
2.	Poove Poove	Joffy Tharakan	Jesin George, Neeraj Suresh
3.	Adra Beat (OMKV Tribute)	Abhin Philip	Jesin George, Ajith C Lokesh
4.	Irul Arangil	Joffy Tharakan	Jesin George, Anna Katharina

== Release ==
The film was released on 9 March 2018 all over Kerala.
