= SIIMA Award for Best Director – Malayalam =

South Indian International Movie Awards

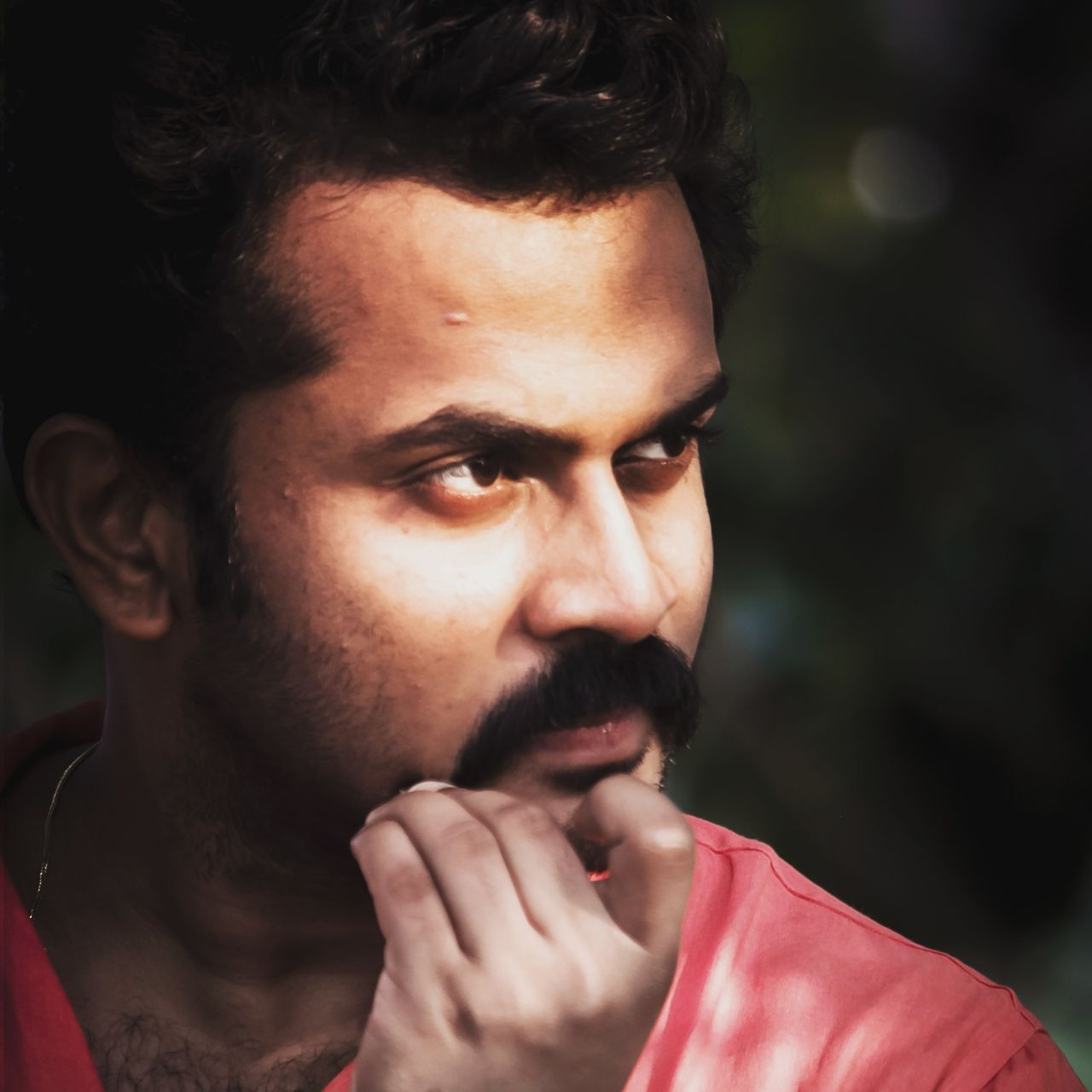
- The 2026 recipient: Tharun Moorthy
- Awarded for: Best Direction Achievement in Malayalam cinema
- Country: India
- Presented by: Vibri Media Group
- First award: 22 June 2012 (for films released in 2011)
- Most recent winner: Tharun Moorthy, Thudarum (2025)

Highlights
- Most wins: Lijo Jose Pellissery and Mahesh Narayanan (2)
- Most nominations: Lijo Jose Pellissery (5)

The SIIMA Award for Best Director – Malayalam is an award, begun in 2012, presented annually at the South Indian International Movie Awards to a director via viewers and the winner is announced at the ceremony. The nominations for the category are given by the jury members.

== Superlatives ==
| Categories | Director(s) | Record |
|---|---|---|
| Most wins | Lijo Jose Pellissery | 2 |
| Most wins | Mahesh Narayanan | 2 |
| Most nominations | Lijo Jose Pellissery | 5 |
| Most nominations without a win | Rosshan Andrrews | 3 |

== Winners and nominees ==
Table key
| ‡ | Indicates the winner |

=== 2010s ===
| Year (Note: Refers to the film's release year) | Director | Film | Ref. |
|---|---|---|---|
| 2011 (1st) | Rajesh Pillai ‡ | Traffic | |
| 2012 (2nd) | Lal Jose ‡ | Ayalum Njanum Thammil | |
| 2012 (2nd) | Anwar Rasheed | Ustad Hotel | |
| 2012 (2nd) | Aashiq Abu | 22 Female Kottayam | |
| 2012 (2nd) | Vineeth Sreenivasan | Thattathin Marayathu | |
| 2012 (2nd) | Madhupal | Ozhimuri | |
| 2013 (3rd) | Jeethu Joseph ‡ | Drishyam | |
| 2013 (3rd) | Lijo Jose Pellissery | Amen | |
| 2013 (3rd) | Kamal | Celluloid | |
| 2013 (3rd) | Shyamaprasad | Artist | |
| 2013 (3rd) | Rosshan Andrrews | Mumbai Police | |
| 2014 (4th) | Anjali Menon ‡ | Bangalore Days | |
| 2014 (4th) | Amal Neerad | Iyobinte Pusthakam | |
| 2014 (4th) | Ranjith | Njaan | |
| 2014 (4th) | Venu | Munnariyippu | |
| 2014 (4th) | Rosshan Andrrews | How Old Are You? | |
| 2015 (5th) | Alphonse Puthren ‡ | Premam | |
| 2015 (5th) | Lal Jose | Nee-Na | |
| 2015 (5th) | Martin Prakkat | Charlie | |
| 2015 (5th) | R. S. Vimal | Ennu Ninte Moideen | |
| 2015 (5th) | Salim Ahamed | Pathemari | |
| 2016 (6th) | Vysakh ‡ | Pulimurugan | |
| 2016 (6th) | Abrid Shine | Action Hero Biju | |
| 2016 (6th) | Priyadarshan | Oppam | |
| 2016 (6th) | Rajeev Ravi | Kammatipaadam | |
| 2016 (6th) | Vineeth Sreenivasan | Jacobinte Swargarajyam | |
| 2017 (7th) | Lijo Jose Pellissery ‡ | Angamaly Diaries | |
| 2017 (7th) | Aashiq Abu | Mayanadi | |
| 2017 (7th) | Dileesh Pothan | Thondimuthalum Driksakshiyum | |
| 2017 (7th) | Mahesh Narayanan | Take Off | |
| 2017 (7th) | Soubin Shahir | Parava | |
| 2018 (8th) | Sathyan Anthikad ‡ | Njan Prakashan | |
| 2018 (8th) | Amal Neerad | Varathan | |
| 2018 (8th) | Lijo Jose Pellissery | Ee.Ma.Yau. | |
| 2018 (8th) | Rosshan Andrrews | Kayamkulam Kochunni | |
| 2018 (8th) | Zakariya Mohammed | Sudani from Nigeria | |
| 2019 (9th) | Lijo Jose Pellissery ‡ | Jallikattu | |
| 2019 (9th) | Khalid Rahman | Unda | |
| 2019 (9th) | Geetu Mohandas | Moothon | |
| 2019 (9th) | Aashiq Abu | Virus | |
| 2019 (9th) | Joshiy | Porinju Mariam Jose | |

=== 2020s ===
| Year | Director | Film | Ref. |
|---|---|---|---|
| 2020 (9th) | Mahesh Narayanan ‡ | C U Soon | |
| 2020 (9th) | Anwar Rasheed | Trance | |
| 2020 (9th) | Sachy | Ayyappanum Koshiyum | |
| 2020 (9th) | Midhun Manuel Thomas | Anjaam Pathiraa | |
| 2020 (9th) | Zakariya Mohammed | Halal Love Story | |
| 2021 (10th) | Mahesh Narayanan ‡ | Malik | |
| 2021 (10th) | Jeethu Joseph | Drishyam 2 | |
| 2021 (10th) | Dileesh Pothan | Joji | |
| 2021 (10th) | Senna Hegde | Thinkalazhcha Nishchayam | |
| 2021 (10th) | Basil Joseph | Minnal Murali | |
| 2022 (11th) | Vineeth Sreenivasan ‡ | Hridayam | |
| 2022 (11th) | Mahesh Narayanan | Ariyippu | |
| 2022 (11th) | Khalid Rahman | Thallumaala | |
| 2022 (11th) | Amal Neerad | Bheeshma Parvam | |
| 2022 (11th) | Tharun Moorthy | Saudi Vellakka | |
| 2023 (12th) | Jude Anthany Joseph ‡ | 2018 | |
| 2023 (12th) | Jeethu Joseph | Neru | |
| 2023 (12th) | Jeo Baby | Kaathal – The Core | |
| 2023 (12th) | Lijo Jose Pellissery | Nanpakal Nerathu Mayakkam | |
| 2023 (12th) | Priyadarshan | Corona Papers | |
| 2024 (13th) | Blessy ‡ | Aadujeevitham | |
| 2024 (13th) | Chidambaram S. Poduval | Manjummel Boys | |
| 2024 (13th) | Rahul Sadasivan | Bramayugam | |
| 2024 (13th) | Girish A. D. | Premalu | |
| 2024 (13th) | Jithu Madhavan | Aavesham | |
| 2024 (13th) | Dinjith Ayyathan | Kishkindha Kaandam | |
| 2025 (14th) | Tharun Moorthy ‡ | Thudarum | |
| 2025 (14th) | Akhil Sathyan | Sarvam Maya | |
| 2025 (14th) | Dinjith Ayyathan | Eko | |
| 2025 (14th) | Dominic Arun | Lokah Chapter 1: Chandra | |
| 2025 (14th) | Prithviraj Sukumaran | L2: Empuraan | |
| 2025 (14th) | Rahul Sadasivan | Diés Iraé | |
