= Vijay Superum Pournamiyum =

2019 film written and directed by Jis Joy

- Theatrical release poster
- Directed by: Jis Joy
- Screenplay by: Jis Joy
- Story by: Tharun Bhascker
- Based on: Pelli Choopulu (Telugu) by Tharun Bhascker
- Produced by: Sunil A. K.
- Starring: Asif Ali; Aishwarya Lekshmi
- Cinematography: Renadive
- Edited by: Ratheesh Raj
- Music by: Songs: Prince George; Score: 4 Musics
- Production company: New Surya Films
- Distributed by: Century Films
- Release date: 11 January 2019
- Country: India
- Language: Malayalam
- Budget: ₹3.5 crore (US$370,000)
- Box office: ₹30 crore (US$3.1 million)

Vijay Superum Pournamiyum (transl. Vijay Super and Pournami) is a 2019 Indian Malayalam-language romantic comedy film, written and directed by Jis Joy, starring Asif Ali and Aishwarya Lekshmi, along with Balu Varghese, Siddique, Aju Varghese and Renji Panicker in supporting roles. It is a remake of the Telugu film Pelli Choopulu (2016) which itself is based on a true story. The film's musical score was composed by debutant Prince George. It was released on 11 January 2019 to positive reviews from the critics and the audience. The movie had a run of 100 days at Kerala box office and was one of successful film of 2019.

The film was produced by A. K. Sunil under the banner of New Surya Films. The film is the third collaboration of Jis Joy and Asif Ali, who earlier worked together in Bicycle Thieves and Sunday Holiday. The director had earlier said that it would be a small, message-driven film with elements suitable for a family audience.

== Plot ==
Vijay (Asif Ali) goes to Pournami's (Aishwarya Lekshmi) house for a prospective first alliance meeting. He has completed his B.Tech, which took him over 5 years, including the make up exams. He is lazy and not very interested in doing any work. His dream is to become a chef and open a restaurant, but he doesn't get any support from his father. Pournami, on the other hand, is very focused and works hard to fulfill her dreams of going to Australia. However, her father does not approve of her idea to go abroad, as she is a girl. When both Pournami and Vijay meet at the matrimonial first meeting, her younger cousin accidentally locks the door and they get locked out. To pass their time, they talk about their past. Pournami reveals that she was in love with a North Indian man named Naresh. They wanted to start a food truck business together. Naresh went to Delhi to talk with his father about their love and business plans. Meanwhile, Pournami started working on her plan eagerly and was ready to surprise Naresh by buying the truck. Naresh does not show to the meeting with her parents, overpowered by the greed of getting dowry. Pournami and her father waited for him but when they realize that Naresh wasn't coming back, her father decides to get her married to someone else.

When it was Vijay's turn to share his past, he reveals that he was unemployed and was always goofing around with his two friends. They made cooking videos together as he is passionate about cooking. But it wasn't profitable enough so, they plan to make prank videos and were caught red-handed by Vijay's father's brother, which ended their plan. He then got a job in a call-center on his father's recommendation. He started going out with a girl to show off to his friends, but she cheated on him. He found out about it only when her actual boyfriend called him at work. Vijay quit his job after having a fight with his boss.

It was then revealed that Vijay came to the wrong address for his matchmaking event. Later, Vijay goes to his actual matchmaking event, which was with a rich family. Meanwhile, Pournami tells the guy coming to her matchmaking event that she's not interested in marriage. The family of Vijay's bride wanted him to be able to run a business. Vijay and Pournami decide to operate the food truck themselves, with Vijay as the chef, and Pournami in charge of the business side of things. At first, they face many difficulties, mainly because of Vijay's and his friends' laziness as well as disagreements with Pournami. This ended when they gave up on the food truck.

Vijay's grandmother visits Pournami's house and tells her father that he should be proud to have such a responsible daughter. She wishes to have a daughter like Pournami in the future. Vijay insists that her father let her pursue her dreams. Pournami recognizes Vijay's good wishes. Pournami later convinces his father that he is an expert cook by cooking them one of Vijay's recipes. They kickstart their business with support from both their parents. After this, their food truck becomes a smashing success. In the process, they fall in love without realizing it, but both of them are engaged to other people, so they drift apart. After realizing they love each other, they come back together through a radio show organized by their friend, with the support of their family and friends. They start their food truck business and K.S. Chitra visits them. Afterwards, it is revealed that they got married.

== Cast ==
- Asif Ali as Vijay / Vijay 'Super'
- Aishwarya Lekshmi as Pinky / Pournami
- Balu Varghese as Roshan, Vijay's friend
- Renji Panicker as Venugopal, Pournami's father
- Siddique as Chandramohan, Vijay's father
- Aju Varghese as YouTube Cleetus
- Shanthi Krishna as Radhamani, Pournami's mother
- Darshana Rajendran as Pooja, Pournami's friend
- Joseph Annamkutty Jose as Vijay's friend
- Austin Dan as Naresh, Pournami's ex-boyfriend
- Aileena Amon as Sonam
- Anish Kuruvilla as Sudheesh, Sonam's father
- Sharan as Hotel Singer
- Devan as Kanaran, Vijay's uncle
- K. P. A. C. Lalitha as Latha, Vijay's grandmother
- Maya Menon as Vijay's mother
- Sonu Anna Jacob as Chithra, Vijay's sister
- Sathi Premji as Pournami's grandmother
- Srikant Murali as Ajay, Event manager
- Shaheen Siddique as Salman, Sonam's love interest
- Viviya Santh as Reshma, Vijay's ex-girlfriend
- Anjali Nair as Pournami's neighbor
- Punnassery Kanchana as Bedridden grandma
- Hakkim Shahjahan as Vishal
- Santhosh Pali
- Gayathri as Grandma's daughter (Cameo Appearance)
- Niranj Suresh as Surya (Cameo Appearance)
- Shashikala Nedungadi as Surya's mother (Cameo Appearance)
- Rajesh Sharma as Doctor (Cameo Appearance)
- K. S. Chithra as herself ( Cameo Appearance)
- Harisanth Sharan as singer (Cameo Appearance)

== Production ==
In March 2018, director Jis Joy announced his third project, starring Asif Ali and Mamta Mohandas in the lead roles, during the 100 day celebration of his previous film Sunday Holiday. Later, actress Aishwarya Lekshmi bagged the female lead replacing Mamta. Principal photography began in July 2018. Locations included Kochi, Bengaluru and Pondicherry. Filming wrapped by that September.

== Music ==
The songs featured in the film were composed by Prince George, while the film score was composed by 4 Musics.

No.	Song	Singer(s)	Lyrics	Length
1	"Enthanee Mounam"	Karthik & Sharon Joseph	Jis Joy	03:01
2	"Pournami Superalle"	Asif Ali, Vineeth Sreenivasan & Balu Varghese	Jis Joy	03:22
3	"Etho Mazhayil"	Vijay Yesudas & Shweta Mohan	Jis Joy	03:36
4	"Pakalaay"	Vijay Yesudas	Jis Joy	04:18
5	"Araaro"	Prince George & Sharon Joseph	Jis Joy	01:35
6	"He is the one"	Lonely Doggy	Lonely Doggy	02:10
7	"Paniyaake Paali"	Niranj Suresh	Jis Joy	00:50
8	" Nisarisa theme"	Prince George	Jis Joy	01:05

== Release ==
The film was released in 114 theatres in Kerala on 11 January 2019. After a successful run in the home state, on 24 January, it was released in GCC centres. The movie was released in major centres such as Dubai, Sharjah, Abu Dhabi, Oman, Bahrain, Qatar and Kuwait.

=== Critical response ===
The Times of India reviewer Deepa Soman rated it 3/5 and stated, "The film is a decent watch on the whole, with warmth in its heart. If not approached with high expectations, the boisterous characters might offer you a good time". Sify stated that the film is a watchable romantic comedy and rated 2.5/5. The Hindu said "The core story of an aimless youth finding his purpose with the help of a girl does not have much novelty in it, but Jis Joy manages to inject a few fresh elements, which makes it enjoyable in parts. It is almost like a movie version of a ‘You too can win’ self-help book, filled with just too many feel-good moments.".

=== Awards ===
Mazhavil entertainment awards 2019
Category	Recipient(s)
Best Actress	Aishwarya Lekshmi
Best Star Pair	Asif Ali & Aishwarya Lekshmi
