= 101 Weddings =

- Theatrical poster
- Directed by: Shafi
- Screenplay by: Kalavoor Ravikumar
- Story by: Shafi
- Produced by: Rafi; Bava Hasainar; Shaleer
- Starring: Kunchacko Boban; Jayasurya; Biju Menon; Samvrutha Sunil; Bhama
- Cinematography: Alagappan N
- Edited by: V. Sajan
- Music by: Deepak Dev
- Production company: Film Folks
- Distributed by: Murali Films; PJ Entertainments Europe
- Release date: 23 November 2012
- Country: India
- Language: Malayalam

101 Weddings is a 2012 Indian Malayalam-language romantic comedy film directed by Shafi, starring Kunchacko Boban, Jayasurya, Biju Menon, Samvrutha Sunil, and Bhama in the lead roles. The film is written by Kalavoor Ravikumar based on a story by the director. It is produced by Shafi's brother Rafi Mecartin, Hasainar, and Shaleer, with audiography by M. R. Rajakrishnan under the banner of Film Folks and features music composed by Deepak Dev.

== Plot ==
The movie opens with the childhood pranks of Krishnankutty, the son of famous Gandhian Munshi Shankara Pillai who is repeatedly beaten up by Antappan, his big schoolmate. Antappan is taking vengeance for the Gandhian deeds of Munshi who has closed down the toddy shop owned by Antappan's father. When a chance comes up, Krishankutty retaliates by placing the costly golden cross in the bag of Antappan, which makes him a thief, and lands him in a juvenile home for young criminals.

As they grow up, Krishnankutty becomes a TV producer under the name Krish but is ready to play foul games and make money by little frauds. But his father Munshi who has now become a much-proclaimed Gandhian finds an able girl in Abhirami, the only daughter of Abkari contractor Bhasi, to reform his son.

Abhirami and Co. who is running the Kasturba Society are on the plans to hold a mass wedding of 101 couples in which she will also find a suitable groom and marry. The mass wedding is arranged in such a way that the interested people are needed to stay in the picturesque resort-like village for two weeks to get familiar with their probable future partners. Krish is reluctant to marry another girl with Gandhian principles and brings in Jyothish Kumar a.k.a. Jyothi, a dance teacher with all female mannerisms, gets him registered as Krishanankutty to make Abhirami move away from this alliance. Antappan and his gang who have now grown up as famous quotation gangs also register for the marriage in the plans to grab the money and 5 gold coins that are given to each couple. As the day of the marriage comes up, more and more people enroll in the mass wedding with their own interesting plans.

== Cast ==
- Kunchacko Boban as Krishnankutty, son of Munshi Shankaran Pillai
  - Master Dhananjay as Young Krishnankutty
- Jayasurya as Jyothish Kumar, a classical dance master
- Biju Menon as Antappan, a rowdy
- Vijeesh as Ricky, friend of Krishnankutty
- Samvrutha Sunil as Abhirami
- Bhama as Rukhiya
- Srindaa as Indira, the mute girl
- Vijayaraghavan as Munshi Shankara Pillai, Krishnankutty's father
- Vanitha Krishnachandran as Sulochana, Krishnankutty's Mother
- Salim Kumar as Khader, Rukhiya's father
- Suraj Venjaramoodu as Sundareshan
- Ponnamma Babu
- Urmila Unni as Vijayamma
- Saju Kodiyan as Kanakambaran
- Sunil Sukhada as Vettanchira Bhasi, Abhirami's father
- Subi Suresh as Sundaresan's wife
- Vinod Kedamangalam as Antappan's friend
- Raveendran as CI Chandrabose
- Yadu Krishnan as Joseph
- Kochu Preman as Lawrence, Antappan's father
- Jayakrishnan as Stephen

== Production ==
Shooting started on 15 July 2012 in Kochi. The other locations are Thodupuzha, Ottappalam, and Hyderabad.

== Soundtrack ==
101 Weddings

Soundtrack album by Deepak Dev
- Released: 28 October 2012
- Genre: Film soundtrack
- Length: 25:32
- Language: Malayalam
- Label: Manorama Music
- Producer: Deepak Dev

Deepak Dev chronology
D Company (2012)	101 Weddings (2012)	I Love Me (2012)

The soundtrack was composed by Deepak Dev, with lyrics penned by Rafeeq Ahmed. The album consists of four songs. The audio rights of the film were acquired by Manorama Music. The album was launched on 28 October 2012 at Kochi.

Track list
No.	Title	Lyrics	Singer(s)	Length
1.	"Cheruchillayil"	Rafeeq Ahmed	Vidyasagar, Deepak Dev	3:49
2.	"Muthodu Mutham"	Rafeeq Ahmed	Aalap Raju	4:25
3.	"Sajalamai"	Rafeeq Ahmed	Yazin Nizar	4:20
4.	"Cheruchillayil Remix"	Rafeeq Ahmed	Vidyasagar, Deepak Dev	4:02
Total length:				25:32

== Reception ==
A critic from Rediff.com wrote that "As for the impact of 101 Weddings it is just a typical Shafi entertainer, which takes a while to reach the climax". A critic from The Times of India wrote that "The film employs crude humour and bawdy one-liners but the effect is incomplete, and the film runs out of all its promised charm way too soon".

== Box office ==
The film collected US$301 from the UK box office.
