= Jis Joy =

Indian dubbing artist and filmmaker

- Born: Vazhakkala, Kochi, Ernakulam, Kerala, India
- Occupations: Film director; Writer; Lyricist; Dubbing artist
- Years active: 2003 – present
- Known for: Sunday Holiday (2017); Vijay Superum Pournamiyum (2019); Thalavan (2024)
- Spouse: Naigy Jis Joy
- Children: Yohan; Nithara
- Relatives: Thomas Joy (Father); Pushpa (Mother)

Jis Joy is an Indian dubbing artist, film writer, director, actor, and lyricist who works in the Malayalam film industry. He made his directorial debut with the 2013 Malayalam film Bicycle Thieves. He dubs for Allu Arjun, for the Telugu to Malayalam dubbed version of movies done by the latter.

== Career ==
Jis Joy started his film career as a dubbing artist who has dubbed for Telugu actor Allu Arjun for Malayalam versions and Prithviraj’s dubbed films. Later, he went on to work as Director and scriptwriter for various advertisements. Though Joy made his feature film directorial debut with Bicycle Thieves in 2013, his second film Sunday Holiday, was released only after 4 years.

== Filmography ==
=== As a director ===
Year	Film	Credited as			Notes	Ref
Year	Film	Director	Story	Screenplay	Notes	Ref
2013	Bicycle Thieves	Yes	Yes	Yes	Directorial debut	
2017	Sunday Holiday	Yes		Yes		
2019	Vijay Superum Pournamiyum	Yes		Yes	Remake of Telugu film Pelli Choopulu	
2021	Mohan Kumar Fans	Yes		Yes		
2022	Innale Vare	Yes		Yes	SonyLIV Film	
2024	Thalavan	Yes				

=== As a lyricist ===
Year	Film	Song	Music composer
2017	Sunday Holiday	"Mazha Paadum"	Deepak Dev
2017	Sunday Holiday	"Oru Nokku Kaanuvan"	Deepak Dev
2017	Sunday Holiday	"Aaro Koode"	Deepak Dev
2017	Sunday Holiday	"Kando Ninte Kannil"	Deepak Dev
2019	Vijay Superum Pournamiyum	"Enthanee Mounam"	Prince George
2019	Vijay Superum Pournamiyum	"Pournami Superalle"	Prince George
2019	Vijay Superum Pournamiyum	"Etho Mazhayil"	Prince George
2019	Vijay Superum Pournamiyum	"Pakalaay"	Prince George
2019	Vijay Superum Pournamiyum	"Araaro"	Prince George
2019	Vijay Superum Pournamiyum	"Paniyaake Paali"	Prince George
2019	Vijay Superum Pournamiyum	" Nisarisa theme"	Prince George

=== As a dubbing artist ===
Film title	Actor	Character	Dub Language	Original language	Original Year Release	Dub Year Release	Notes
Black	Niyas Musliyar	Pappadi Sabu	Malayalam	Malayalam	2004		
Annorikkal	Narain	Benny Varghese	Malayalam	Malayalam	2005		
Thaskaraveeran	Niyas Musliyar	Johny Eppan	Malayalam	Malayalam	2005		
Vargam	Renji V Nair	Dennis Chacko	Malayalam	Malayalam	2006		
Vargam	Devan	Ex.M.L.A Ummen Chacko	Malayalam	Malayalam	2006		
Ennittum	Dinu Dennis	Prem Gopal	Malayalam	Malayalam	2006		
Chempada	Govind	Akash	Malayalam	Malayalam	2008		
Gopalapuranam	Ramana	Gopalakrishnan	Malayalam	Malayalam	2008		
Four Friends	Manikuttan	Vishnu	Malayalam	Malayalam	2010		
Uppukandam Brothers: Back in Action	Srikanth	Uppukandam Bobby	Malayalam	Malayalam	2011		
Sevenes	Joju George	Rameshan	Malayalam	Malayalam	2011		
Ordinary	Jishnu Raghavan	Jose Mash	Malayalam	Malayalam	2012		
Kaashh	Rajeev Pillai	Sarath	Malayalam	Malayalam	2012		
Gangotri	Allu Arjun	Simhadri	Malayalam	Telugu	2003	2009	The Malayalam dub was titled: "Simhakuty".
Arya	Allu Arjun	Arya	Malayalam	Telugu	2004		
Bunny	Allu Arjun	Bunny alias Raja	Malayalam	Telugu	2005		The Malayalam dub was titled: "Bunny: The Lion".
Chatrapathi	Prabhas	Sivaji	Malayalam	Telugu	2005		
Happy	Allu Arjun	Bunny	Malayalam	Telugu	2006		The Malayalam dub was titled: "Happy: Be Happy".
Desamuduru	Allu Arjun	Bala Govind	Malayalam	Telugu	2007		The Malayalam dub was titled: "Hero: The Real Hero".
Munna	Prabhas	Mahesh alias Munna	Malayalam	Telugu	2007		
Dubai Seenu	Ravi Teja	Srinivasan alias Seenu	Malayalam	Telugu	2007		
Parugu	Allu Arjun	Krishna	Malayalam	Telugu	2008		The Malayalam dub was titled: "Krishna".
Arya 2	Allu Arjun	Arya	Malayalam	Telugu	2009		
Varudu	Allu Arjun	Sandeep Mohan Ram	Malayalam	Telugu	2010		The Malayalam dub was titled: "Varan".
Vedam	Allu Arjun	Cable Raju	Malayalam	Telugu	2010		The Malayalam dub was titled: "Killadi: The Robber".
Badrinath	Allu Arjun	Badrinath	Malayalam	Telugu	2011		
Dam 999	Joshua Fredric Smith	Captain Fredrick Brown	Malayalam	English	2011		
Julayi	Allu Arjun	Ravindra Narayan	Malayalam	Telugu	2012		The Malayalam dub was titled: "Gajapokkiri".
Iddarammayilatho	Allu Arjun	Sanju Reddy	Malayalam	Telugu	2013		The Malayalam dub was titled: "Romeo & Juliets".
Race Gurram	Allu Arjun	Lakshman/Lucky	Malayalam	Telugu	2014		The Malayalam dub was titled: "Lucky The Racer".
Yevadu	Allu Arjun (extended cameo)	Sathya (before surgery)	Malayalam	Telugu	2014		The Malayalam dub was titled: "Bhaiyya My Brother".
S/O Satyamurthy	Allu Arjun	Viraj Anand	Malayalam	Telugu	2015		
Rudhramadevi	Allu Arjun	Gona Ganna Reddy	Malayalam	Telugu	2015		
Sarrainodu	Allu Arjun	Gana	Malayalam	Telugu	2016		The Malayalam dub was titled: "Yodhavu".
Duvvada Jagannadham	Allu Arjun	Duvvada Jagannadham Sastri (Dhruvaraja Jagannadham Shastri in Malayalam version)/DJ	Malayalam	Telugu	2017		The Malayalam dub was titled: "Dhruvaraja Jagannadh".
Naa Peru Surya	Allu Arjun	Surya	Malayalam	Telugu	2018		The Malayalam dub was titled: "Ente Peru Surya, Ente Veedu India".
Ala Vaikuntapuramuloo	Allu Arjun	Bantu	Malayalam	Telugu	2020		The Malayalam dub was titled: "Angu Vaikunthapurathu".
Pushpa: The Rise	Allu Arjun	Pushpa Raj	Malayalam	Telugu	2021		
Pushpa: The Rule	Allu Arjun	Pushpa Raj	Malayalam	Telugu	2024		

== Recurring collaborators ==
Films	Asif Ali	Siddique	KPAC Lalitha	Aju Varghese	Balu Varghese	Sreenivasan	Saiju Kurup	Sudheer Karamana	Srikant Murali
Bicycle Thieves (2013)	check	check	check	check	check		check		
Sunday Holiday (2017)	check	check	check			check		check	check
Vijay Superum Pournamiyum (2019)	check	check	check	check	check				check
Mohan Kumar Fans (2021)	check	check	check			check	check	check	check
Innale Vare (2022)	check								check
Thalavan (2024)	check								
