= Aparna Balamurali =

Indian actress (born 1995)

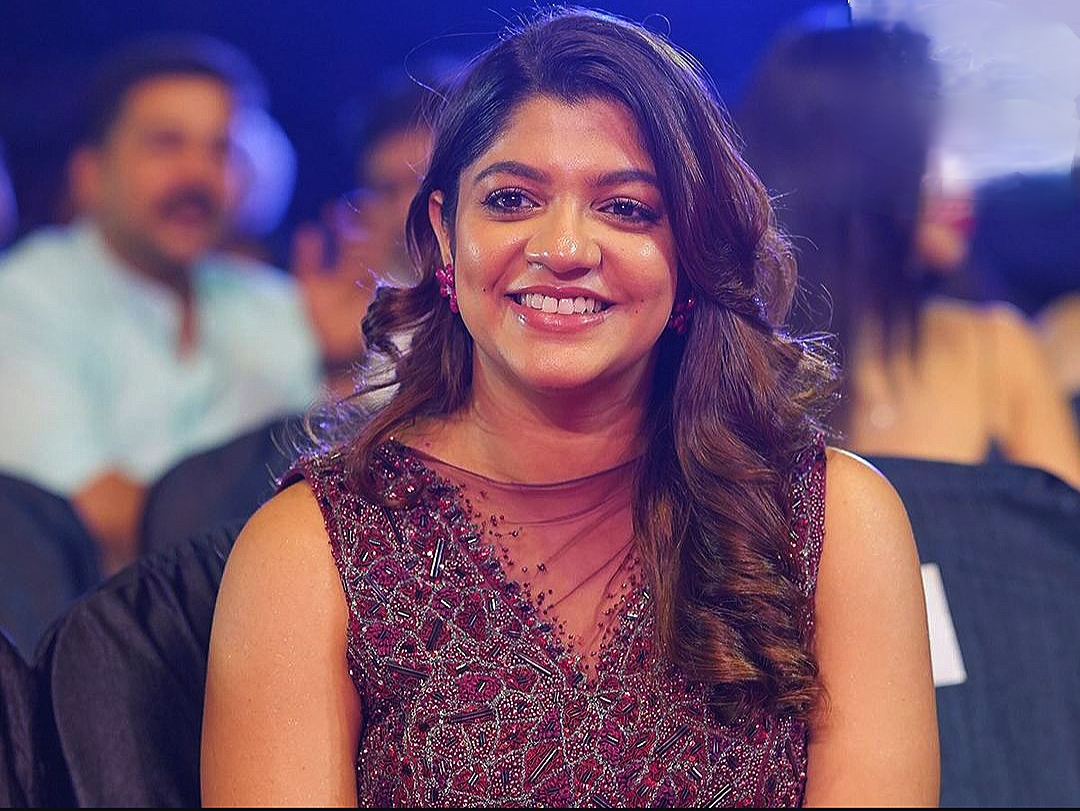
- Aparna in 2024
- Born: Aparna Balamurali Menon; 11 September 1995 (age 31); Thrissur, Kerala, India
- Occupation: Actress
- Years active: 2015—present

Aparna Balamurali (born 11 September 1995) is an Indian actress and playback singer, who primarily works in Malayalam and Tamil films. She is the recipient of a National Film Award and a Filmfare Award South. Aparna is known for her roles in the films Maheshinte Prathikaaram (2016), Sunday Holiday (2017), Soorarai Pottru (2020), and Kishkindha Kaandam (2024), winning the National Film Award for Best Actress for Soorarai Pottru. In 2025, Aparna was placed by Forbes Asia in their 30 Under 30 list.

== Early life ==
Aparna was born in Thrissur, Kerala, India to K. P. Balamurali Menon, a music director and Shobha Balamurali. She attended Devamatha CMI Public School. She studied architecture at Global Institute of Architecture, Palakkad. It was through her college instructor, Unnimaya Prasad, that she received an opportunity to audition for Maheshinte Prathikaram.

== Career ==
In 2015, Aparna's debut movie Oru Second Class Yathra was released. She rose to fame with her film named, Maheshinte Prathikaaram (2016). She also starred in a comedy Oru Muthassi Gadha (2016). She made her Tamil debut in 8 Thottakkal (2017). She played in Sunday Holiday (2017) and Thrissivaperoor Kliptham (2017). In both films, she is paired opposite Asif Ali. Her 2018 releases are Kamuki and B. Tech. She has been cast as the Tamil film's heroine in Sarvam Thaala Mayam (2019) starring G. V. Prakash Kumar. Her subsequent films in Malayalam were Mr. & Ms. Rowdy (2019) and Jeem Boom Bhaa (2019). She appeared as Bommi in Suriya starrer Soorarai Pottru (2020). The next Tamil movie was Theethum Nandrum (2021).

== Filmography ==
Key
†	Denotes films that have not yet been released

=== Films ===
Year	Title	Role	Language	Notes	Ref.
2015	Oru Second Class Yathra	Amritha Unnikrishnan	Malayalam		
2016	Maheshinte Prathikaaram	Jimsy Augustine	Malayalam		
2016	Oru Muthassi Gada	Alice / Young Leelamma	Malayalam		
2017	8 Thottakkal	Meera	Tamil		
2017	Sunday Holiday	Anu	Malayalam		
2017	Sarvopari Palakkaran	Anupama Neelakandan	Malayalam		
2017	Thrissivaperoor Kliptham	Bhageerati	Malayalam		
2017	Mayaanadhi	Herself	Malayalam	Guest appearance	
2018	Kamuki	Achama Varghese (Achu)	Malayalam		
2018	B. Tech	Priya	Malayalam		
2019	Allu Ramendran	Swathy	Malayalam		
2019	Sarvam Thaala Mayam	Sara	Tamil		
2019	Mr. & Ms. Rowdy	Poornima	Malayalam		
2019	Jeem Boom Bhaa	Muth	Malayalam	Cameo	
2020	Soorarai Pottru	Sundari Nedumaaran (Bommi)	Tamil		
2021	Theethum Nandrum	Sumathi	Tamil		
2022	Veetla Vishesham	Sowmya	Tamil		
2022	Sundari Gardens	Suma (Sundari Mathews)	Malayalam		
2022	Ini Utharam	Dr.Janaki Ganesh	Malayalam		
2022	Nitham Oru Vaanam	Mathivadani	Tamil		
2022	Kaapa	Prameela	Malayalam		
2023	Thankam	Keerthi	Malayalam		
2023	2018	Noora, T.V Reporter	Malayalam		
2023	Dhoomam	Diya	Malayalam		
2023	Padmini	Adv. Sreedevi (Sree)	Malayalam		
2024	Raayan	Meghalai	Tamil		
2024	Adios Amigo	Minimol	Malayalam	Voice only	
2024	Kishkindha Kaandam	Aparna	Malayalam		
2024	Rudhiram	Swathy	Malayalam		
2025	Mirage	Abirami / Anjali	Malayalam		
2025	Mindiyum Paranjum	Leena	Malayalam		
2026	Chinna Chinna Aasai	Janaki	Malayalam		
TBA	Ula †	TBA	Malayalam	Filming	

=== Television ===
Year	Title	Role	Language	Channel	Notes	Ref.
2019	Laughing Villa season 3	Herself	Malayalam	Surya TV	Guest; Reality show	
2019	Sa Re Ga Ma Pa Keralam	Herself	Malayalam	Zee Keralam	Guest; Reality show	
2020	Super 4	Herself	Malayalam	Mazhavil Manorama	Guest; Reality show	
2022	Puthu Puthu Arthangal	Sowmya	Tamil	Zee Tamil	Cameo; Serial	
2022	Fingertip (season 2)	Shruti	Tamil	ZEE5	Web series	
2023	Star Singer season 9	Herself	Tamil	Asianet	Guest; Reality show	
2024	Manorathangal	Bharathi	Malayalam	ZEE5	Anthology web series Segment : Kadalkkaattu	
2025	Bigg Boss Malayalam season 7	Herself	Malayalam	Asianet	Guest; Reality show	

=== Other works ===
Year	Title	Language	Channel	Notes
2016	Mazhayayi	Malayalam	YouTube	Music album
2017	Naadu	Malayalam	YouTube	Music album
2020	It's me nature	Malayalam	YouTube	Music album
2021	Bin Bulaye	Hindi	YouTube	Short film

== Discography ==
Year	Song	Film	Co-singer	Language
2016	"Mounangal Mindumoree"	Maheshinte Prathikaaram	Vijay Yesudas	Malayalam
2016	"Thennal Nilavinte"	Oru Muthassi Gadha	Vineeth Sreenivasan	Malayalam
2016	"Vinnil Theliyum Meghame"	Pa Va	Vijay Yesudas	Malayalam
2017	"Mannippaya Ena Ketkadhe"	8 Thottakkal	Udhay Kannan	Tamil
2017	"Mazha Paadum"	Sunday Holiday	Arvind Venugopal	Malayalam
2017	"Thanthane"	Naadu (Music Album)		Malayalam
2020	"Kanyamariyame"	Kanyamariyame (Music album)		Malayalam
2021	"Veyil Choodum"	Veyil Choodum (Music album)		Malayalam
2021	"Ninnil ninnum Njan"	Hased (Music album)		Malayalam
2022	"Thada Buda Kaathu" (Promotional song)	Nitham Oru Vaanam		Tamil

== Awards and nominations ==
Year	Film	Award	Category	Result	Ref
2020	Soorarai Pottru	National Film Award	Best Actress	Won	
2020	Soorarai Pottru	Filmfare Awards South	Critics Award for Best Actress – Tamil	Won	
2020	Soorarai Pottru	SIIMA Awards	SIIMA Critics Award for Best Actress – Tamil	Won	
2020	Soorarai Pottru	Tamil Nadu State Film Awards	2020	Won	
