= Mujeeb Majeed =

Indian musical artist

- Born: September 21, 1985 (age 41); Thrissur, Kerala, India
- Occupations: Music composer; arranger; singer
- Instrument: Keyboard
- Years active: 2009–present

Mujeeb Majeed (born on 21 September 1985 in Thrissur Kerala) is an Indian music composer, music arranger, and singer. He debuted in mainstream cinema as music director of the Malayalam-language film Mandharam released in 2018. Mujeeb works primarily in Malayalam films. His background score for the short film Pawssible won him a Kerala State Television Award for Best Music Director. He is currently based in Kochi, Kerala.

== Early life ==
As a child, Mujeeb was introduced to music by his family. His grandfather was a self-taught percussionist and his uncles used to sing with several musical troupes in Kerala. In an online interview, he mentioned A. R. Rahman as his primary inspiration to become a music producer. It was after listening to the soundtrack album of the Bollywood film Taal, at the age of 14, that he decided to create his own music.

== Career ==
An opportunity that came through his friend Asha G. Menon, to compose the title track of a television show titled Hridayaragam, kickstarted Mujeeb's career as a composer.

Mujeeb received his first feature film opportunity in 2018 with Mandharam. In 2021, he composed the songs and background score for the National award winner Thinkalazhcha Nishchayam.

== Discography ==
=== As film composer ===
Year	Title	Songs	Background Score	Notes
2017	Grace Villa	No	Yes	Short film
2018	Mandharam	Yes	Yes	
2018	Porattam	No	Yes	
2019	Loser	Yes	Yes	Short film
2021	Pawssible	Yes	Yes	Short film. Won Kerala State Television Award for Best Music.
2021	Alice in Panchalinadu	Yes	No	Ethranaal Ethranaal song
2021	Thinkalazhcha Nishchayam	Yes	Yes	
2022	Kudukku 2025	No	Yes	
2022	Roop Nagar Ke Cheetey	No	Yes	Marathi film
2022	1744 White Alto	Yes	Yes	
2024	Perilloor Premier League	Yes	Yes	Disney+ Hotstar webseries
2024	Rautu Ka Raaz	No	Yes	Hindi film
2024	Kishkindha Kaandam	Yes	Yes	
2025	Rekhachithram	Yes	Yes	
2025	Dheeran	Yes	Yes	
2025	Eko	Yes	Yes	
2025	Kalamkaval	Yes	Yes	
2026	Chatha Pacha: The Ring of Rowdies	No	Yes	
2026	Unmadham	Yes	Yes	
2026	Pradhama Drishtiya Kuttakkar	Yes	Yes	

=== As independent artist ===
Song(s)	Year	Singer(s)	Lyrics	Label
Haara Haara (From "Loser")	2019	Mujeeb Majeed	Satyavarat Sinh Jadeja	Goodwill Entertainments
Orio & Marigold	2019	Abhay Jodhpurkar	Satyvredh Jadeja	Times Music
Haram	2020	Mujeeb Majeed, Devika Ashok, Vineeth Vasudevan	Vineeth Vasudevan	Avisio Entertainments
Aaraaraanivide naam (From "Pawssible")	2021	Vineeth Sreenivasan	Vinayak Sasikumar	Saina Music
