= Dheeran (2025 film) =

Indian Malayalam-language action comedy film

- Theatrical release poster
- Directed by: Devadath Shaji
- Screenplay by: Devadath Shaji
- Produced by: Ganesh Menon; Lakshmi Warrier
- Starring: Rajesh Madhavan; Jagadish; Ashokan; Manoj K. Jayan; Sidharth Bharathan; Vineeth; Sudheesh
- Cinematography: Harikrishnan Lohithadas
- Edited by: Finn George Varghese
- Music by: Mujeeb Majeed
- Release date: 4 July 2025
- Running time: 137 min
- Country: India
- Language: Malayalam

Dheeran (transl. Brave) is a 2025 Indian Malayalam-language action comedy film directed by Devadath Shaji. The music director is Mujeeb Majeed, director of photography is Harikrishnan Lohithadas and the editor is Finn George Varghese. The producers are Ganesh Menon and Lakshmi Warrier.

The film released on 4 July 2025 with U/A 16+ certificate and received mixed-to-positive reviews from critics and audience.

== Premise ==
The story follows Eldhose (aka Dheeran), a former village hero working as a henchman for a gangster in Tamil Nadu. When rumors of his death reach his hometown, a group of relatives embark on a chaotic road trip in an ambulance to retrieve his body.

== Plot ==
Eldhose works for Abubacker, a Malayali gangster based in Erode, who assigns him to infiltrate the factory of his rival Saravanan in Denkanikottai and kill him.

In flashback, the story shifts to Eldhose’s native village, Malayattoor. As a child, Eldhose saved a grown man, Aruvi, from drowning but could not save his own father in the same incident. He later received a bravery medal from the President of India and came to be known in the village as "Dheeran."

Years later, panchayat president Abbas receives news that Eldhose has died in a factory accident in Tamil Nadu. Abbas undertakes the task of bringing the body back before New Year, arranging an ambulance from temple worker Spinesh. He is joined by Aruvi, Kunjan, Joppan, Dixon, and Suramya’s mother, who is traveling to Palakkad, where Suramya now lives.

Aruvi, now an alcoholic and a workshop welder, had been abandoned by his wife, who eloped with his Bengali assistant. He joins the journey because Eldhose once saved his life. Dixon, Eldhose’s brother-in-law, represents the family. Spinesh had been engaged to Suramya, but their marriage was cancelled after a food poisoning incident. Suspicion briefly fell on Eldhose, who had shown interest in Suramya. Later, Suramya entered into a casual relationship with Eldhose, but when they were discovered together, Abbas attempted to arrange their marriage. Suramya refused commitment, leading Eldhose to leave the village. In a scuffle, Abbas was injured, and Eldhose fled, eventually saving Abubacker from drowning and joining his gang. Suramya later married elsewhere and settled in Palakkad. Kunjan, who had long been attracted to Suramya’s mother, joins the trip to accompany her, and his brother Joppan also comes along.

It is later revealed that Eldhose is alive. Saravanan had killed another worker, Gireesan, and passed off the body as Eldhose’s while keeping him captive. When the villagers arrive to claim the body, Saravanan realizes they were not behind the attempt on his life. Eldhose escapes with the help of Malli’s daughter, a local liquor seller.

After taking the body, the villagers visit the factory to demand compensation. There, they discover Saravanan himself is the owner. Confrontations break out, and Eldhose joins them in fighting Saravanan’s men. During this, Joppan confesses he had added laxatives to the food at Suramya’s cancelled wedding feast due to a quarrel with Kunjan, who was the caterer for the event.

As the group flees, Abubacker and his men appear, leading to a final clash between the two gangs. Spinesh ignites New Year crackers in the ambulance, triggering an explosion with its oxygen cylinder. The villagers escape, while Saravanan and his men are killed. Eldhose returns home, and the villagers begin their New Year celebrations.

== Cast ==
- Rajesh Madhavan as Eldhose (Dheeran)
- Jagadish as Abbas
- Ashokan as Kunjan
- Manoj K. Jayan as Aruvi
- Sidharth Bharathan as Gireeshan
- Vineeth as Abubacker
- Sudheesh as Joppan
- Shabareesh Varma as Spinesh
- Abhiram Radhakrishnan as Dixon
- Srikrishna Dayal as Saravanan
- Arun Cherukavil as Suhail
- Aswathy Manoharan as Suramya
- Indumathy Manikandan as Malli
- Vijaya Sadhan as Sathi

== Production ==
Dheeran marks the directorial debut of Devadath Shaji. The film is produced by Lakshmi Warrier and Ganesh Menon under the banner of Cheers Entertainments. Harikrishnan Lohithadas served as the cinematographer, while the music was composed by Mujeeb Majeed.

== Release ==
The film was certified 12A by the British Board of Film Classification, with a U/A 16+ certification from Central Board of Film Certification and released theatrically in India on 4 July 2025. The film released on SunNXT from 22 August 2025.

== Reception ==
The film received mixed reviews from critics.

Onmanorama called it "an adventurous journey filled with fun, thrills and a few bumps". The Indian Express felt the film "teleports us back to the 80s—for all the wrong reasons", noting underwhelming performances and outdated execution. The New Indian Express said, "a charming cast and quirky village humour lift this uneven comedy".
