= Kishkindha Kaandam =

2024 Malayalam film by Dinjith Ayyathan

- Theatrical release poster
- Directed by: Dinjith Ayyathan
- Written by: Bahul Ramesh
- Produced by: Joby George Thadathil
- Starring: Asif Ali; Vijayaraghavan; Aparna Balamurali
- Cinematography: Bahul Ramesh
- Edited by: Sooraj E. S.
- Music by: Mujeeb Majeed
- Production company: Goodwill Entertainments
- Distributed by: Phars Films; Yash Raj Films (UK/Europe)
- Release date: 12 September 2024
- Running time: 125 minutes
- Country: India
- Language: Malayalam
- Budget: ₹7 crore
- Box office: ₹77 crore

Kishkindha Kaandam (transl. The Book of Kiṣkindhā) is a 2024 Indian Malayalam-language mystery thriller film directed by Dinjith Ayyathan and written by Bahul Ramesh. The film stars Asif Ali, Vijayaraghavan, Aparna Balamurali, Jagadish and Ashokan. The film is the first installment of Bahul Ramesh's Animal Trilogy followed by Kerala Crime Files 2 (2025) and Ekō (2025). The story takes place in the monkey-inhabited Kallepathi reserve forest where ex-military officer Appu Pillai and his son Ajay Chandran, a forest officer, reside.

Principal photography began in July 2023 and was wrapped up after 40 days of filming in Kerala and Hyderabad in August 2023. The film's music was composed by Mujeeb Majeed while the editing and cinematography was done by Sooraj E. S. and Bahul Ramesh respectively.

The film released on 12 September 2024 to critical acclaim and became a commercial success at the box office. It is the highest-grossing film of Asif Ali's career in a leading role. It also emerged as the 9th highest grossing Malayalam film of 2024 and one of the highest grossing Malayalam films of all time.

== Plot ==
Appu Pillai, a retired soldier in the Indian Army known for his authoritarian conduct, lives with his younger son Ajayachandran alias Ajayan close to a reserve forest, which is infested with a huge population of monkeys. Ajayan was previously married to Praveena, who died due to cancer two years ago, and Chachu, their son, went missing a year before she died; however, Ajayan continues his search for Chachu with Shivadasan, a cop and his relative, and Prasobh, Praveena's brother. Ajay marries Aparna while Appu Pillai finds his licensed pistol missing. Aparna moves in with Ajayan, leaving behind a job in Bangalore and helps him in his pursuit of Chachu. However, she notices Appu Pillai's strange demeanour and tells Ajayan that he might be suffering from memory loss issues; Ajayan confirms her suspicions and reveals that Appu Pillai was sent out of the army due to his ailment but he chose to keep it a secret to maintain his pride and developed his own techniques to function normally; Ajayan tells Aparna that his father furiously refrained from visiting a doctor and cautions her not to discuss it with him.

Amrith Lal, apparently a colleague of Appu Pillai, visits him like he frequently does and Appu Pillai, who recognizes him from their photograph together on the wall, retrieves small notes he made on Amrith during his previous visit and engages in conversation with him accordingly but he grows dubious when his notes caution him against trusting Amrith and that the latter doesn't seem to be a former soldier. Appu Pillai accuses Amrith of manipulating him, and they get into a heated exchange until Aparna and Ajayan intervene and thereupon, Appu Pillai forgets what has happened, and Amrith departs as if nothing has happened. One day, two wildlife photographers roaming in the forest capture an image of a monkey holding a pistol and report to the authorities, who suspect that it might belong to Appu Pillai and summon him for investigation. He asserts that the pistol is his, and the locals are warned to be careful; elsewhere, a skeleton is discovered during an excavation in their neighbouring property, which Appu Pillai had sold off two years ago. Though the skeleton is initially suspected to be of Chachu, it is revealed to be of a large monkey, and the forensics reveal that it has died of a bullet shot, and the bullet's size matches the size of bullets used in Appu Pillai's missing pistol.

Appu Pillai is taken in for investigation while Aparna and Ajayan visit Sumadathan, their family friend. The latter reveals that three years ago, when Ajayan and Praveena were engaged with the latter's chemotherapy session, Chachu stole Appu Pillai's pistol at home and fired it, inadvertently killing the monkey; Sumadathan buried the monkey to cover the crime and Appu Pillai had subsequently forgotten the events but frequently visits Sumadathan, asking him the same thing about what has happened on that day. Elsewhere, due to his amnesia, Appu Pillai fails to give rational answers during the investigation and breaks down. Ajayan intervenes, revealing to the police about his father's condition and presents a document which proves that he was fired from the army due to his health condition. The police, fearing repercussions for issuing a licensed gun to a mentally unstable person, let him go. Amrith Lal is revealed to be a psychiatrist hired by Ajayan, and he frequently visits Appu Pillai to take notes on his health condition under the guise of his colleague. Aparna, who has earlier witnessed Appu Pillai putting some notes and documents on fire and involved in an altercation with him to resist him, breaks into his room and finds a hidden collection of notes he has been making on his personal investigation on Chachu's missing case and finds one such note stating that two bullets are missing from his pistol; one is used in killing the ape and the whereabouts of the other bullet remains unknown. She also discovers Appu Pillai's "missing" pistol in the secret compartment of his cabinet.

Appu Pillai arrives and fumes at Aparna for breaching his privacy; the latter later confronts Ajayan, disclosing her discoveries. Ajayan reveals that three years ago, Praveena had caught Chachu playing with the pistol and asked him to hand it over, but when he refused to give it, a scuffle ensued, and Praveena unintentionally pulled the trigger, killing him. When Ajayan returned home, he found Praveena mourning Chachu's death; he realised that Praveena consumed an overdose of her medicines in agony and rushed her to the hospital, leaving behind Chachu's corpse in a hurry. When he returned home, he found Chachu's dead body missing, the floor was cleaned, and Appu Pillai was having his dinner, implying that he had disposed of Chachu's body but eventually forgot the incident. Days later, Ajayan saw Appu Pillai burning his collection of notes and evidence; Appu Pillai told Ajayan that he had come to know through his investigation that Chachu had been killed due to his gun, but he didn't want to know because of whom it occurred, claiming that he couldn't envision his family members as murderers throughout his life. Since then, they have maintained that Chachu has gone missing. Ajayan further tells Aparna that, however, Appu Pillai repeatedly forgets the occurrences, investigates the missing pistol, realises the truth and again burns his findings to conceal it.

Aparna and Ajayan, in the end, travel to Nagpur to search for the "missing" Chachu while Appu Pillai is engaged with his investigation once again, reflecting the never-ending cycle and the misery Ajayan has to go through throughout his life.

== Cast ==
- Asif Ali as Ajay Chandran K .V. "Ajayan"
- Vijayaraghavan as K. Appu Pillai, an ex-military officer, Ajayan's father
- Aparna Balamurali as Aparna, Ajayan's second wife
- Jagadish as Sumadathan, Appu Pillai's friend
- Ashokan as Sivadasan, Ajayan's relative
- Nishan as Sudheer
- Shebin Benson as Prashobh, Ajayan's brother-in-law
- Master Aarav as Chinmay "Chachu", Ajay's son
- Vyshnavi Raj as Pravina "Pravi", Ajayan's first wife and Chachu's mother
- Major Ravi as Jacob
- Nizhalgal Ravi as Dr. Amrith Lal
- Amal Raj Dev as Vinayan
- Kottayam Ramesh as DYSP
- Arjun Ambat as a wildlife photographer
- Shravan K Dev as Police inspector

== Production ==
=== Development ===
Kishkindha Kaandam, the fourth book of the epic Ramayana, tells Rama and Lakshmana's hunt for Sita, leading them to the vanara realm of Kishkindha. However, director Dinjith Ayyathan said that, there is no direct connection to the epic. The story which is set in a reserve forest centers around lives of its inhabitants. The characters are surrounded by monkeys. The film's title has the tagline A Tale of Three Wise Monkeys, however the film is not on them. During the COVID-19 lockdown in Chennai, Dinjith and cinematographer Bahul Ramesh were in search for ideas. According to Dinjith, " We initially considered a script which was written by Bahul first, but later he narrated a different idea and completed the draft in eight days. That draft immediately excited me and made me decide that it should be my second film."

The film was announced in September 2022 that would feature Asif Ali and Aparna Balamurali. It has story, dialogues, and screenplay written by Bahul Ramesh. He has also handled the cinematography. Sooraj E S will be editing the film. Sushin Shyam was reported as the music composer during the announcement. Later Mujeeb Majeed was the composer for the film. The film is produced by Kaka Stories and Joby George Thadathil's Goodwill Entertainments. While beginning the pre-production work, one of their challenge was to locate a house set in a dense forest, where the characters reside. They rediscovered Olappamanna Mana in Vellinezhi near Cherpulassery and finalised that house for shooting although the story is set near Nilambur.

=== Casting ===
The film marks the second collaboration of Director Dinjith Ayyathan and Asif Ali after Kakshi: Amminippilla (2019). Aparna Balamurali plays the female lead role who reunites Asif Ali after 2018 (2023), Kaapa (2022), B Tech, (2018) Sunday Holiday, (2017) and Thrissivaperoor Kliptham (2017). Vijayaraghavan, Jagadish, Ashokan, Nishan, Vyshnavi Raj, Major Ravi, Shebin Benson, Kottayam Ramesh, Bilas Chandrahasan, Master Aarav and Jibin Gopinath were cast in significant roles. Nizhalgal Ravi who had appeared in one Malayalam film back in 1982 was cast to play a role in the film.

=== Filming ===
Principal photography commenced in July 2023 with a puja function. The shooting was wrapped up after 40 days of filming in Kerala and Hyderabad in August 2023.

== Release ==
=== Theatrical ===
The film released on 12 September 2024 worldwide, coinciding with Onam.

=== Home media ===
The digital and satellite rights of the film are acquired by Disney+ Hotstar and Asianet reportedly for an amount of ₹12 crore. The film began streaming on Disney+ Hotstar from 19 November 2024.

== Reception ==
=== Critical response ===
The film received positive reviews from critics. On the review aggregator website Rotten Tomatoes, 95% of 17 critics' reviews are positive, with an average rating of 8/10.

S. R. Praveen of The Hindu wrote: "A flawless screenplay drives this intriguing mystery drama". Anandu Suresh of The Indian Express rated the film 4 out of 5 stars and reviewed "Asif Ali, Aparna Balamurali-starrer is a brilliantly written, skillfully crafted mystery drama". Vivek Santhosh of The New Indian Express rated the film 4/5 and wrote: "A sublime and poignant mystery bolstered by terrific performances".

Anjana George of The Times of India rated the film 3.5 out of 5 stars and wrote: "Asif Ali and Vijayaraghavan bring depth to this intense psychological drama". Sanjith Sidharthan of the OTT Play rated 3.5/5 and wrote, "This Asif Ali-starrer might be a dark horse during the Onam season. The performances and writing will surely keep you engaged, and if you are a fan of slow-burn thrillers, then it’s a greatly rewarding experience." Cris of The News Minute wrote, "The film thrills in an icy sort of way, keyed as it is by a very smooth script and packed with some smart direction. The mysteries of this story lie among the living."

Manjusha Radhakrishnan of Gulf News wrote, "This film, smartly written, is also a masterclass in taking its own time to come into its own. The unhurried pace of storytelling packs a punch toward the end, is a testament to Dinjith Ayyathan’s direction."

=== Box office ===
In the first three days of its release the film collected ₹4.85 crore worldwide. The film grossed ₹7 crore at the KBO in five days. The film grossed ₹14.73 crore in Kerala in 8 days earning ₹25 crore at the worldwide box office. By the end of its second weekend (11 days), it grossed ₹46 crore worldwide, of which ₹27.30 crore came from India while overseas gross was US$2.22 million.

The film grossed ₹55.75 crore worldwide in two weeks. The total worldwide gross collection reached ₹65 crore collecting ₹34 crore from Kerala, ₹4 crore from ROI and ₹25 crore from the international locations in the 18 days of its release. In its theatrical run it grossed ₹77 crore worldwide.

== Music ==
The film contains one song "Vaanara Lokam" composed by Mujeeb Majeed with lyrics by Shyam Muraleedharan, sung by Job Kurian and Jmymah.
