= Theethum Nandrum =

2021 action drama film

- Theatrical release poster
- Directed by: Rasu Ranjith
- Produced by: H. Charles Immanuvel
- Starring: Rasu Ranjith; Aparna Balamurali; Lijomol Jose; Easan
- Cinematography: Kavin Raj
- Edited by: Rasu Ranjith
- Music by: C. Sathya
- Production company: NH Hari Silverscreens
- Release date: 12 March 2021
- Running time: 138 minutes
- Country: India
- Language: Tamil

Theethum Nandrum (transl. Bad and Good) is a 2021 Indian Tamil-language crime drama film written and directed by Rasu Ranjith. He also edited the film and featured in the lead role alongside Aparna Balamurali, Lijomol Jose and Easan. The film was released on 12 March 2021.

== Plot ==
Dass (Eesan), Siva (Rasu Ranjith), and Maaran (Sandeep Raj) are burglars who always escape the clutches of the law. Dass marries Sumathi (Aparna Balamurali), and Siva is in love with Thamizh (Lijomol Jose). One fine day, Sumathi, who is aware of Dass's livelihood, tells him that she is pregnant and requests him to quit his illegal endeavors. Dass does not comply and secretly continues burgling with his friends, and is caught by the police. After they are released from jail, they encounter challenges in their lives, with the newborn child being sick. Both friends' lives are in shambles. They connect with Maaran and commit one more burglary, but everything goes awry when Maaran double-crosses them.

== Cast ==
- Rasu Ranjith as Siva
- Aparna Balamurali as Sumathi
- Lijomol Jose as Thamizh
- Eesan as Daas
- Sandeep Raj as Maaran
- Inba Ravikumar as Aaru
- Karunakaran as Dharmalingam
- Kaalayan Sathya as Rajendran

== Production ==
Director-actor Rasu Ranjith made his directorial debut, having earlier been a part of the reality show Naalaiya Iyakkunar. In mid-2018, Aparna Balamurali and Lijomol Jose were both cast in the film after Rasu Ranjith had spotted their performances in Maheshinte Prathikaaram (2016). Although it was the first Tamil film signed by both actresses, their other films released before Theethum Nandrum.

Aparnaa Balamurali's presence in the team garnered further publicity for the team as it prepared for release in 2021. The actress had risen to fame with a pivotal role in Soorarai Pottru (2020).

== Release ==
The film opened on 12 March 2021 across Tamil Nadu. A reviewer from Times of India wrote "though the film stands out for the way emotions have been handled between varied characters, it takes its own sweet time to establish the plot." Cinema Express gave the film a positive review, noting "this crime-thriller stands tall with its simple, straightforward storytelling and some brilliant performances" and adding "on the whole, the entire team has aided Rasu Ranjith in weaving a compelling tale".

A reviewer from Sify compared the film to Pattiyal (2006) and Subramaniapuram (2008), labelling it a "watchable gangster action thriller".
