= Mandharam =

Indian Malayalam-language romance film

- Theatrical release poster
- Directed by: Vijesh Vijay
- Screenplay by: M. Sajas
- Story by: Vijesh Vijay
- Produced by: Monisha Rajeev; Tinu Thomas
- Starring: Asif Ali; Varsha Bollamma; Arjun Ashokan; Anarkali Marikar
- Cinematography: Bahul Ramesh
- Edited by: Vivek Harshan
- Music by: Mujeeb Majeed
- Production company: Magic Mountain Cinemas
- Release date: 5 October 2018
- Country: India
- Language: Malayalam

Mandharam (transl. Hibiscus) is a 2018 Indian Malayalam-language romance film directed by Vijesh Vijay and scripted by M. Sajas, with Asif Ali in the lead role. The film was produced by Monisha Rajeev and Tinu Thomas under the banner of Magic Mountain Cinemas.

== Cast ==
- Asif Ali as Rajesh
- Arjun Ashokan as Renjith
- Varsha Bollamma as Charu
- Anarkali Marikar as Devika
- Jacob Gregory as Tittu
- Vineeth Vishwam as Nazer
- Arjun Nandhakumar as Roshan
- Sandeep Narayanan as police officer
- Megha Mathew
- K. B. Ganesh Kumar as Satheesh, Rajesh's father
- Kausalya as Lakshmi, Rajesh's mother
- Srikant Murali as Chellappan, Charu's uncle
- Krishna Prasad
- Unni Dev
- Indrans
- Karthika Kannan
- Badri Krishna
- Krittika Pradeep

== Production ==
Mandaram was produced by Monisha Rajeev and Tinu Thomas under the company Magic Mountain Cinemas. The film has Asif Ali in five looks. The story spans 25-plus years – from the protagonist's childhood to his life at 32. So, Asif will be seen in different appearances in each stage of the character's life.

== Music ==
Mandharam is a music-oriented film and features 7 songs. It also marks the debut of composer Mujeeb Majeed.

No.	Title	Lyrics	Singer(s)
1	Nooru Vattam	Vinayak Sasikumar	Sinov Raj
2	Kanne Kanne	Shabareesh Varma	Neha Venugopal, Niranj Suresh
3	Mittayi	Vijesh Vijay	Anusha Joseph
4	Pulari Mazhakal	Vinayak Sasikumar	Shaktisree Gopalan, Balu Thankachan
5	Neeye Neeye	Shabareesh Varma	Ajay C. Jameson
6	Mizhimuna	Vijesh Vijay	Vipin Lal
7	Kadalazham	Vinayak Sasikumar, Piyush Kapoor	Karthik, Zia Ul Haq, Piyush Kapoor
