= Thalavan =

2024 Indian film

- Theatrical release poster
- Directed by: Jis Joy
- Written by: Anand Thevarkkat; Sarath Perumbavoor
- Dialogues by: Jis Joy
- Produced by: Arun Narayan; Sijo Sebastian
- Starring: Biju Menon; Asif Ali
- Cinematography: Sharan Velayudhan
- Edited by: Sooraj E. S.
- Music by: Deepak Dev
- Production companies: Arun Narayan Productions; London Studios
- Distributed by: Central Pictures; Phars Films (Overseas); Yash Raj Films (UK/Europe)
- Release date: 24 May 2024
- Running time: 133 minutes
- Country: India
- Language: Malayalam
- Box office: ₹46.60 crore

Thalavan (transl. Chief) is a 2024 Indian Malayalam-language police procedural crime thriller film directed by Jis Joy and written by Anand Thevarkkat and Sarath Perumbavoor. The film stars Biju Menon and Asif Ali, with Miya George, Anusree, Dileesh Pothan and Kottayam Nazeer in supporting roles.

The film was released on 24 May 2024. It received positive reviews from critics and became a commercial success at the box office.

== Plot ==
The film begins with retired DYSP Udayabhanu, who has transitioned from his police career to hosting a popular television show where he narrates real-life crime stories from his past. The central plot kicks off when Udayabhanu reluctantly decides to cover the infamous "Cheppanamthotta Case," a case that had shocked the community and involved two police officers, Circle Inspector Jayashankar and Sub-Inspector Karthik.

The narrative flashes back to the events leading up to the case. Karthik, known for his righteous approach, releases a man named Manu Das, who was caught in an attempted murder case but claimed it was an act of self-defense. This decision causes tension within the police department, especially with Jayashankar, a seasoned and more pragmatic officer. Their professional relationship is further strained when Manu Das is rearrested, adding layers of complexity and mistrust between them.

As the story unfolds, Jayashankar finds himself in the midst of a personal nightmare. He discovers the lifeless body of Ramya, the wife of a man he had previously arrested, on his terrace. Despite having no evidence directly linking him to the crime, Jayashankar is arrested and charged with her murder. This shocking development sets off an intense investigation that puts both Jayashankar and Karthik's principles and careers to the test.

== Cast ==
- Biju Menon as CI later DySP Jayashankar
- Asif Ali as SI later CI Karthik Ravindran
- Miya George as Sunitha, Jayashankar's wife
- Anusree as Ramya, Joshy's wife
- Dileesh Pothan as Retd. DySP Udhayabanu
- Shankar Ramakrishnan as SP Hemanth Ram
- Ranjith as Home Minister T. K. Raghavan
- Kottayam Nazeer as CPO Reghu
- Jaffar Idukki as Allappan
- Bilas Chandrahasan Nair as Retd. ASI Shivadhasan
- Joji John as ASI Venu
- Renjit Shekar as CPO Harris
- Anuroop p as Sajeevan
- Sujith Shankar as Joshy
- Tessa Joseph as Reshma Hemanth
- Dinesh Prabhakar as Vinayakan
- Nebish Benson as Arun Shivadhasan

== Production ==
Director Jis Joy, who has previously worked with actor Asif Ali in four films signed the actor again, this time with actor Biju Menon. Debutants Anand Thevarkatt and Sharath Perumbavoor were hired to write the screenplay. Arun Narayan, who had earlier produced Eesho and Chaaver decided to produce the film with Sijo Sebastian. Actors Miya George, Dileesh Pothan and Shankar Ramakrishnan were signed for key roles. Biju Menon was signed as a natural choice for the cop, as he had done many cop roles earlier in his career. The director, Jis Joy, claimed Thalavan as his most successful film in terms of canvas.

== Release and reception ==
Thalavan released on 24 May 2024, received generally positive reviews. Swathi P Ajith of Onmanorama gave a positive review praising the film as a well-crafted investigative thriller with strong performances from the leads. Vivek Santhosh of The New Indian Express also gave a positive review rating the movie 3/5. Writing for The Hindu, S. R. Praveen praised the film for its intriguing plot but felt it fell short of its potential. In contrast, Anandu Suresh of The Indian Express gave a negative review; remarking "Jis Joy's film suffers from poorly crafted dialogues, a weak script that fails to elevate the film and abrupt shifts in tone between a police procedural and a crime thriller that detract from the overall experience."

== Box office ==
The film garnered a domestic collection of ₹95 lakhs on Day 1 and ₹60 lakhs on Day 2, crossed 25 crores gross on 18 June, 2024. Finally, the film ended its theatrical run after 75 days with a gross collection of ₹46.50 crores.

== Sequel ==
After the release of the film, the Director Jis Joy stated that if the audience like the film, it will have a sequel. During the success meet of the film, the makers announced that the film will have a sequel titled Thalavan 2.
