= Sevenes =

- Film poster
- Directed by: Joshiy
- Written by: Dr. Iqbal Kuttippuram
- Produced by: Santhosh Pavithram, Sajai Sebastian
- Starring: Kunchacko Boban; Asif Ali; Nivin Pauly; Vineeth Kumar; Mithun Ramesh; Rejith Menon; Aju Varghese; Vijeesh; Ameer niyaz Nadiya Moidu; Sampath Ram; Rima Kallingal
- Cinematography: Ajayan Vincent
- Edited by: Ranjan Abraham
- Music by: Bijibal
- Production companies: Pavithram Creations; Zion International Film Factory (Incan Global Canada)
- Distributed by: Playhouse Release & PJ Entertainments
- Release date: 8 September 2011
- Running time: 150 minutes
- Country: India
- Language: Malayalam

Sevenes is a 2011 Indian Malayalam-language sports-action film written by Iqbal Kuttipuram and directed by Joshiy. The film stars Kunchacko Boban, Asif Ali, Nivin Pauly, Vineeth Kumar, Mithun Ramesh, Rejith Menon, Aju Varghese, Ameer Niyaz, and Vijeesh in lead roles with Nadia Moidu, Sampath Ram, Rima Kallingal, Bhama and Joju George in supporting roles. The film centres on seven young men who play sevens football, popular in Malabar. Filming began in April 2011 in Kozhikode district.

== Plot ==
Shyam and his six other friends, including Suraj, Shaukath, Arun, Linto, Vijeesh, and Sharath, always play together in their sevens football team. In an attempt to cement their place in the more famous Kozhikode Strikers Club, they take on an opponent player, Aravindan, leading to serious head injuries. Gravely hurt by the plight of Aravindan, they now try to arrange the necessary amount for his surgery by taking up a quotation by a broker named Habib. As days go by, they come across new financial problems and in between take part inadvertently in the homicide of a mafia king's son. Within hours, the hunters now turn out to be the ones being hunted by the mafia ruling the city.

== Cast ==
- Kunchacko Boban as Shyam
- Asif Ali as Sooraj
- Nivin Pauly as Shaukath
- Vineeth Kumar as Aravindan
- Mithun Ramesh as Ashokan
- Rejith Menon as Sharath
- Ameer Niyaz as Linto
- Aju Varghese as Arun
- Vijeesh as Satheesh
- Nadiya Moidu as SSP Amala Vishnunadhan IPS (voiceover by Bhagyalakshmi), City Police Commissioner
- Bhama as Gowri, Ashokan's sister and Shyam's love interest
- Rima Kallingal as Anjana, Aravindan's sister and Sooraj's love interest
- Sampath Ram as Beypore Sreedharan (voiceover by Shobi Thilakan)
- Maniyanpilla Raju as Habeebullah (Habeeb)
- Ramya Raj as Linda
- Mahadevan as Ramakrishna Moorthy (voiceover by Rizabawa)
- Nihal as Manoharan Moorthy
- Joju George as Rameshan, Sreedharan's henchman (voiceover by Jis Joy)
- Kazan Khan as Sudhakara Moorthy (voiceover by Praveen Harisree)
- Mamukkoya as Koya
- Shivaji Guruvayoor as CI Kumaran
- Rajesh Hebbar as Max Owner
- Bindu Panicker as Nirmala, Shyam's mother
- Zeenath as Arun's mother
- Preethi Sanjeev
- Ambika Mohan as Gowri's and Ashokan's mother
- Cherthala Lalitha

== Music ==
The film score and soundtrack were composed by Bijibal. The soundtrack consists of three tracks, including one theme music track, with lyrics written by Rafeeq Ahamed and Santhosh Varma.

Track listing

#	Song	Artist(s)	Composer	Lyricist
1	"Kaalamonnu Kaalaal"	Arun Alat, Jayaram, Renjith, Sreenath	Bijibal	Santhosh Varma
2	"Meghathoppil"	Karthik	Bijibal	Rafeeq Ahamed, Santhosh Varma
3	"Ore Kinaamalarodum"	Balram, Anuradha Sriram	Bijibal	Rafeeq Ahamed, Santhosh Varma
4	"Theme Song [Instrumental]"	Instrumental	Bijibal	Rafeeq Ahamed, Santhosh Varma
