= Unmadham =

- Theatrical release poster
- ഉന്മാദം
- Directed by: Kiran Das
- Written by: Shahi Kabir
- Produced by: Kumar Mangat Pathak; Abhishek Pathak
- Starring: Kunchacko Boban; Lijomol Jose
- Cinematography: Arjun Sethu
- Edited by: Kiran Das; Jithin John
- Music by: Songs: Mujeeb Majeed; Score: Justin Varghese
- Production companies: Panorama Studios; T-Series Films
- Distributed by: Panorama Studios
- Release date: 31 July 2026
- Running time: 141 minutes
- Country: India
- Language: Malayalam
- Box office: ₹4.52 crore

Unmadham (transl. Madness) is a 2026 Indian Malayalam-language crime thriller horror film directed by Kiran Das (in his directorial debut) and written by Shahi Kabir. It was produced by Kumar Mangat Pathak and Abhishek Pathak through Panorama Studios and T-Series Films. The film stars Kunchacko Boban, Lijomol Jose, Siddique, Krishna Prabha, Vishak Nair, Sudheesh, Sabumon Abdusamad, and Kottayam Nazeer. Mujeeb Majeed and Justin Varghese composed the film's songs and original score.

It was released theatrically on 31 July 2026.

== Plot ==
Shelly, a civil police officer working in a remote police station, struggling with problems in his personal life, takes up the investigation of a long-unsolved unnatural death case in the hope of securing a transfer. The film leads to events of reality and superstition.

== Cast ==
- Kunchacko Boban as CPO Shelly
- Lijomol Jose as Sowmya, wife of shelly
- Raina Radhakrishnan as Keerthana
- Shyna Radhakrishnan as Karthika
- Kiran Peethambaran as SCPO Joshy
- Siddique as Adv.John Mathew Manjooran
- Kottayam Nazeer as Inspector SHO later DYSP Sathyajith
- Shaju Sreedhar as Sumesh
- Krishna Praba as Rimi
- Vishak Nair as Tale end CPO
- Vishnu G Varier as Lover of Keerthana
- Sudheesh as Rtd. SI Narayan Sharma
- Sabumon Abdusamad as DySP Alexmon George
- Arun Cherukavil as CI Manoj
- Sibi Thomas as Psychiatrist Dr. Paul Jacob
- Soubin Shahir as (Special appearance, cameo)
- Vineeth Thattil as Home Guard
- Goukalan as IP Ponnani Police
- Ashok as DySP Sidharth Ashok

== Music ==
The film's music was composed by Mujeeb Majeed, while the background score was composed by Justin Varghese. The audio rights were acquired by T-Series. The first single, "Akale", sung by Bijibal with lyrics by Vinayak Sasikumar, was released on 24 July 2026. The second single was released on 29 July 2026, ahead of the film's theatrical release.

== Release ==
The film was released theatrically worldwide on 31 July 2026.

=== Home Media ===
The film’s post-theatrical streaming rights have been acquired by SonyLIV. The film has officially been confirmed to premiere on 4 September 2026.

== Production ==
Principal photography of the film began in October 2024. The filming took place at various locations across Kerala and was completed in early 2025.

== Reception ==
The Indian Express gave the film 3 out of 5 stars and praised Kunchacko Boban's performance, Kiran Das's direction, and the film's atmospheric treatment. Anna Mathews of The Times of India gave the film 3.5 out of 5 stars and praised Kiran Das's direction, Kunchacko Boban's performance, and the film's atmospheric storytelling, and also the realistic police procedural drama.
