= Mohan Kumar Fans =

2021 film by Jis Joy

- Directed by: Jis Joy
- Written by: Jis Joy
- Story by: Bobby-Sanjay
- Produced by: Listin Stephen
- Starring: Siddique; Kunchacko Boban; Anarkali Nazar; Mukesh; Sreenivasan
- Cinematography: Bahul Ramesh
- Edited by: Ratheesh Raj
- Music by: Songs: Prince George; Score: William Francis
- Production company: Magic Frames
- Distributed by: Magic Frames Release
- Release date: 19 March 2021 (India)
- Running time: 124 minutes
- Country: India
- Language: Malayalam

Mohan Kumar Fans is a 2021 Indian Malayalam-language comedy drama film written and directed by Jis Joy. Produced by Listin Stephen under the Magic Frames banner, it stars Siddique in title role. Kunchacko Boban played the role of a singer. The film also features Anarkali Nazar, Mukesh, Sreenivasan, Vinay Forrt, Saiju Kurup, Ramesh Pisharody, and Krishna Shankar in pivotal roles. The songs are composed by Prince George, while the score is composed by William Francis. The film premiered on 19 March 2021.

The film was theatrically released on 19 March 2021 and received mixed reviews from critics.

== Synopsis ==
The story revolves around Mohan Kumar a yesteryear actor who has recently made his comeback in films after many years. He is passionate about cinema and has high hopes of winning a National Film Award for his recent performance. The film explores his relationship with movies and how his friends and family support him in achieving his dreams.

== Cast ==
- Kunchacko Boban as Krishnanunni a.k.a. Kichu
- Siddique as Mohan Kumar
- Anarkali Nazar as Sreerenjini Mohan Kumar
- Mukesh as Prakash
- Sreenivasan as Br. Paulutty
- Vinay Forrt as Kripesh / Aghosh Menon
- Saiju Kurup as Sathyadas, Krishnanunni's Brother
- Ramesh Pisharody as Saji
- Krishna Shankar as Pratheesh
- T. G. Ravi as Ravi
- Alencier as Ajayan, Krishnanunni's Father
- Major Ravi as Raghu
- Joy Mathew as RC
- Adil Ibrahim as Arun Rajeev
- Sudheer Karamana as Fr. Jacob
- K. P. A. C. Lalitha as Nandini, Krishnanunni's Aunt
- Deepa Thomas as Brighty Aaghosh Menon
- Srikant Murali as Nandakishore
- Anjali Nair as Krishnan Unni's Sister
- Prasanth Alexander as Krishnan Unni's Brother in Law
- Sreelakshmi as Dr. Deepika, Prakash's wife
- Sethu Lakshmi as Kumariamma, Mohan Kumar's housemaid
- Nisthar Sait as Hamsa Randathani

=== Cameo appearances ===
- Asif Ali as himself
- Sharreth as himself
- Jassie Gift as himself
- Chitra Iyer as herself
- Jis Joy as Movie Director

== Reception ==
The film received mostly positive reviews from critics. Awarding the film 3.5 on a scale of 5, Sajin Shrijith from The New Indian Express wrote; "its a fairly effective blend of satire and emotional drama. He added despite the excess melodrama, Mohan Kumar Fans manages to be a smile-inducing entertainer."
