= Chronic Bachelor =

2003 Indian-Malayalam romantic comedy drama film

- Promotional poster
- Directed by: Siddique
- Written by: Siddique
- Produced by: Fazil
- Starring: Mammootty; Mukesh; Rambha; Indraja; Bhavana; Innocent; Lalu Alex; Biju Menon
- Cinematography: Anandakuttan
- Edited by: K. R. Gowrishankar; T. R. Sekhar
- Music by: Deepak Dev
- Production company: Ammu International
- Distributed by: PJ Entertainments
- Release date: 16 April 2003 (India)
- Running time: 165 minutes
- Country: India
- Language: Malayalam

Chronic Bachelor is a 2003 Indian Malayalam-language romantic comedy film, written and directed by Siddique. The film stars Mammootty in the titular role as Sathyaprathapan, a wealthy and successful businessman and also a chronic bachelor and somewhat a misogynist due to some unpleasant and disastrous incidents which happened in his childhood. Mukesh, Rambha, Indraja, Bhavana, Innocent, Lalu Alex and Biju Menon plays supporting roles. Jyothika was signed as the lead actress but later was replaced by Rambha. The movie was produced by Fazil. The film was a commercial success. It was later remade in Tamil as Engal Anna starring Vijayakanth and in Telugu as Kushi Kushiga with Jagapati Babu.

== Plot ==
The film opens with a flashback showing a feud between the families of Sathyaprathapan and Bhavani. Sathyaprathapan's sister, Geetha and Bhavani's cousin, Vishnu are in love. The murder of Vishnu is wrongly blamed on Balagangadharan, father of Sathyaprathapan. Sathyaprathapan's sister commits suicide and Sathyaprathapan turns against his father, who dies soon. He starts to help Bhavani's family and mortgages his own house to finance her factory. Feelings of love develop between Sathyaprathapan and Bhavani. But Bhavani's greedy father wants to destroy Sathyaprathapan's family and tries to take their home. That is when Parameshwara Pillai (Sathyaprathapan's uncle) shows up. Sathyaprathapan's mother requests Pillai to prove Balagangadharan's innocence. Pillai and Sathyaprathapan find Kuruvilla who had witnessed the murder being committed by the goons sent by Bhavani's father. Meanwhile, Sathyaprathapan's mother faints and dies in the hospital. While in the hospital, his mother tells how Balagangadharan had a different wife and he should ask them forgiveness. He storms into Bhavani's house and accuses her dad of destroying his family, also trying to make her understand the truth but she does not believe him and stands by her father. Then Sathyaprathapan says he does not love her any more and vows that he will never trust a woman and remain a bachelor forever.

Then film comes to the present time showing a legal battle between Sathyaprathapan (now called SP) and Bhavani with regard to SP's family property. As SP wins the legal battle to get back his house, Bhavani becomes furious and vows to destroy SP.

From here, the story moves to the day-to-day life of SP and falls into a comic track throughout the first half. SP is now a wealthy entrepreneur and a successful businessman with the able support of his uncle. SP has a half-sister, Sandhya, born to his father's first wife. He now lives for her. But she does not know that SP is her brother, although she stays in the next door hostel. Kuruvilla is SP's aide and he too is a bachelor. Bhama comes to stay in the same hostel and tries to win the heart of SP. But SP considers her a complete nuisance and always gets irritated by her antics and pranks.

Parameswaran Pillai now comes to meet SP to tell about his son Sreekumar, who is a flirt and womanizer. SP agrees to take Sreekumar with him and make him a good human being. But he is now after Sandhya and agrees to stay with SP, when he realises that Sandhya stays next door to SP. Comical scenes recur where Kuruvilla, who does not like Sreekumar and his friend Ugran, tries to get them out of the house.

Bhama learns that SP is sponsoring Sandhya's studies and confronts him. SP tells her that Sandhya is his sister. Bhama then asks Sandhya to call SP for her birthday party. But SP gets upset and confronts Bhama. Bhama then reveals to Sandhya that her sponsor was SP all the while. During Sandhya's birthday party, Bhavani comes and takes Bhama away. Then it becomes clear that Bhama is Bhavani's sister. Rivalry arises between Bhama and Bhavani and Bhama runs away from home and promises to help SP, but he tells her he has no hatred at all. Then Bhama's family members come to take her forcefully, but is stopped by Sreekumar and SP.

Then SP asks Sandhya to move to his house. Srikumar and Ugran is moved to the guest house. Sandhya finally shows affection to Sreekumar. One day SP and Kuruvilla catch Sreekumar trying to reach Sandhya through the balcony. SP comes to know that both of them love each other. He fixes the marriage of Sandhya and Sreekumar. He transfers everything he has to Sandhya's name because Sreekumar's family thought Sandhya was an orphan. SP tells everything to Parameshwaran Pillai's family which is overheard by Sandhya who runs home crying. SP tries to comfort her saying that he will live his life as an apology to her mother's curses. But Sandhya tells that her mother had no hatred to SP and told her to ask forgiveness if she sees him. Now Sandhya and SP re-unite as siblings. During the marriage festivities, Bhavani and her brother Hareendhran come to prevent the celebrations. Bhavani's family brings along with them the elder brother of Sandhya, Shekarankutty. He challenges SP, saying that he has more right over Sandhya as he is her brother, while SP is just a half-brother. Shekarankutty then claims all of SP's property, which SP is willing to give, provided Sandhya lives happily and marries Sreekumar. In the brawl, SP vows that Sandhya will marry Sreekumar and he will wipe off everyone who stands in the way. Bhavani then tells SP that Sandhya will be married off to Hareendhran. Shekarankutty supports the proposal in the name of revenge.

On the wedding day, as the brothers fight among themselves, Sreekumar brings Sandhya to their midst. She says she would marry anyone that both her brothers tell her. SP tells Sandhya he knows what needs to be done to end the family feud once and for all. He then marches to Bhavani's house and starts hitting Bhavani's father as well as Bhavani and bashing up each and every person in his way. In the end, SP points at Kuruvilla and says he is the witness of Vishnu's murder. Bhavani's father finally admits that he killed Vishnu and framed it on SP's father. Then SP pours kerosene on Bhavani's dad and as he approach Bhavani, he is stopped by Hareendaran who begs for his sisters life. Bhavani realizes her mistakes and goes to SP's house to apologize. But she tells SP that only thing she can now offer is the marriage proposal of her sister Bhama to SP. SP initially refuses but finally agrees when Sreekumar tells that he'll also remain a bachelor if SP does not marry.

== Cast ==
- Mammootty as Sathyaprathapan (SP)
  - Biyon as Young Sathyaprathapan
- Indraja as Bhavani
  - Nivia Rebin as Young Bhavani
- Rambha as Bhama, SP's love interest
- Bhavana as Sandhya, SP's and Shekarankutty's Younger sister
- Mukesh as Sreekumar
- Innocent as Kuruvilla
  - Idavela Babu as Young Kuruvilla
- Harisree Ashokan as Ugran, Sreekumar's friend and cousin
- Janardhanan as Parameshwaran Pillai, Sreekumar's father
- Mohan Ayroor as Kunnumpurath Neelakandan, Bhavani's father
- Biju Menon as Hareendran
- Lalu Alex in a dual role as:
  - Balagangadharan, Shekarankutty's, SP's and Sandhya's father
  - Shekarankutty, SP's and Sandhya's elder brother
- K. P. A. C. Lalitha as Vimala, Sreekumar's mother
- Sabitha Anand as Savithri
- Sherin Tom as Maxy
- Seema G. Nair as Kunjulakshmi
- Zeenath as Bhavani's, Hareendran's and Bhama's mother
- Joemon Joshy as Bhadran
- Shajin as Vishnu
- Aniyappan as Drunkard
- Deepika Mohan as Sreekumar's relative
- Nazeer Latheef as Sreekumar's relative
- Shobha Sankar as Passport Office Staff
- Binda as Bhama's friend
- Beena Sabu as Matron

== Music ==
Chronic Bachelor

Soundtrack album by Deepak Dev
- Released: March 2003
- Studios: Dev's Wonderland, Kochi; Krishna DigiDesign; Sound of Music, Chennai; Media Artist, Chennai
- Genre: Film soundtrack
- Label: Satyam Audios

Deepak Dev chronology
Chronic Bachelor (2003)	Time (2007)

All music is composed by Deepak Dev, who made his debut through this film with all of the songs becoming chartbusters.

No.	Title	Writer(s)	Artist(s)	Length
1.	"Chirichiriyo (Version 1)"	Kaithapram	K. J. Yesudas, Ganga	5:02
2.	"Swayamvara Chandrike" (Raga: Kharaharapriya)	Kaithapram	P. Jayachandran, Sujatha Mohan	4:48
3.	"Kannil Nilaavu"	Kaithapram	K. S. Chithra	5:18
4.	"Pakalpoove"	R. K. Damodaran	K. J. Yesudas, P. S. Renuka	6:58
5.	"Shilayil Ninnum" (Raga: Darbari Kanada)	Kaithapram	Sujatha Mohan	2:43
6.	"Chirichiriyo (Version 2)"	Kaithapram	K. J. Yesudas, Ganga	5:02
7.	"Kannil Nilaavu (Remix)"	Kaithapram	K. S. Chithra, Riju Gregory	4:32
8.	"Theme of Chronic Bachelor"	Instrumental	Deepak Dev	3:16
9.	"Shilayil Ninnum" (Raga: Darbari Kanada)	Kaithapram	Sujatha Mohan, Fahad	5:49
10.	"Chundathu"	Kaithapram	M. G. Sreekumar, Chitra Iyer	5:10
11.	"Pakalpoove"	R. K. Damodaran	K. J. Yesudas	4:28

== Reception ==
The film received positive reviews and became commercial success at the box office. Sify wrote, "Mammootty has given a very restrained performance as SP and he has allowed other characters like Innocent, Mukesh and Rambha to steal the punchlines and songs. Siddique should be appreciated for weaving a run-of-the-mill story of revenge, ego and misunderstandings mixed well into a comedy drama."

The film became the third-highest grosser of the year, coming in close behind Balettan (2003) and C. I. D. Moosa (2003).
