= Innale Vare =

- Official Film Poster
- Directed by: Jis Joy
- Screenplay by: Jis Joy
- Story by: Bobby–Sanjay
- Produced by: Mathew George
- Starring: Antony Varghese; Nimisha Sajayan; Asif Ali
- Cinematography: Bahul Ramesh
- Edited by: Ratheesh Raj
- Music by: 4 Musics
- Production company: Central Advertising
- Distributed by: SonyLIV
- Release date: 9 June 2022
- Running time: 140 Minutes
- Country: India
- Language: Malayalam

Innale Vare (transl. Until yesterday) is an 2022 Indian Malayalam-language crime mystery thriller film, which is directed by Jis Joy and produced by Mathew George. The film stars Antony Varghese, Nimisha Sajayan and Asif Ali in lead roles. The film was directly released on SonyLIV OTT platform on 9 June 2022.

== Plot ==
Adhi Shankar is a leading actor in Malayalam film industry. He has made a number of enemies with his arrogant behavior and womanizing ways. He has a serious relationship with a retailer, Aishu, while having a sexual affair with married co-actor, Karthika Lakshmi. He also disappoints multiple movie producers and is under severe financial pressure.

One day, he gets tricked by Anjali, posing as a fan, and held captive in her flat. Together with her co-conspirator, Sharath, Anjali manages to hold Adishankar captive for a few days while controlling his life by accessing his smart phone. They thwart Aadhi's efforts to escape.

The duo destroys Adhi's personal life as well by using his social media account and sending misleading messages to both Karthika Lakshmi and Aishu. Posing as Aadhi, Sharath contacts Adhi's manager and manages to extract 1.5 crores of cash. It is revealed that Anjali and her family are facing eviction from their own house by a bank, whom they owe 1.5 crores.

Once the money is received, Anjali and Sharath releases Aadhi. Though Aadhi contacts police immediately, they do not believe his story. Also, Anjaly and Sharath cleverly fabricate an alternate version of events in which Aadhi is an abusive boyfriend of Anjaly. Police inspector, even though not entirely convinced by this version, advises Aadhi that proceeding further with his complaint will only tarnish his public image.

Aadhi is scorned by his mother and Aishu alike with Aishu leaving him for good and Karthika's husband visits him to inform that he is divorcing her too. Aadhi now wants to get back at Anjali and Vinod for spoiling his life like this. Ahead of their property auction, both Anjali and Vinod hide the 1.5 crores got through deceiving Aadhi in her compound well and wait for their source to convert it into white money for settling the bank loan. Since they couldn't do it on time, the bank officials come and start the attachment proceedings one day. During the process, they hear some sounds from the outhouse and discovers Aadhi imprisoned there. The issue escalates and police arrives, when Aadhi accuses Anjali to have kidnaped him and extracted the money from him and tells the police and media that they were in a relationship. He had planted himself there with the help of his manager Jomi to get back at Anjali and Vinod. During the commotion Jomi discovers someone upstairs and leads Aadhi to the place.

Aadhi is shocked to discover that the house belongs to Aanandhan, a producer who was running behind Aadhi to get him dub for his portions and release his long pending movie. Aadhi had declined to do so since the movie had run into production hell and 2-3 movies had already released meanwhile with the same theme. He had attempted suicide at the prospectus of losing his house and is bedridden now. Anjali was Aanandhan's daughter, and the entire plot was her attempt at retaining their house using Aadhi himself. Anjali and Vinod are arrested and taken away based on Aadhi's statement and circumstantial evidence. However, after seeing Aanandhan's state, Aadhi withdraws his case and convinces the bank to give some more time to the owners to pay up. Since they got a time extension from the bank due to Aadhi, Anjali and Vinod returns Aadhi's 1.5 crore at his shooting set. Aadhi promises to do another film under Aanandhan's banner to help them replay the loans and invites both to his wedding with Karthika.

== Cast ==
- Antony Varghese as Vinod Sreedhar / Sharath
- Nimisha Sajayan as Anjali / Shani
- Asif Ali as Aadhi Shankar
- Reba Monica John as Aishu
- Athulya Chandra as Karthika Lakshmi
- Nandu as Aanandhan
- Rony David as Jomi
- Sreelakshmi as Aadhi's mother
- Unni Nair as Sudhakaran
- Anand Bal
- Siddique as himself
- Irshad as Circle Inspector Yasser
- Nisha Mathew as Anjali's mother
- Manoranjan as medical shop owner

== Production ==
The pooja of the film was in April 2021. Shooting began in Kochi soon after the pooja ceremony. Shooting wrapped up in September 2021. The title of the film was decided later and the first look poster of the movie was released on 5 February 2022. The dubbing works ended in March 2022. All the other post-production works of the film was done in March 2022.

== Release ==
The film was directly released on the OTT platform, SonyLIV on 9 June 2022.

== Reception ==
Firstpost gave a rating of 3.25 out of 5 for the movie and stated that, "The film is not constructed as a pacey, edge-of-the-seat thriller, but instead one that appears more straightforward than it actually is and is less focused on suspense than it is on the human condition. The one who steals the show in Innale Vare though is Nimisha Sajayan who is simultaneously oily and scared, terrified yet determined."

Dhanya K. Vilayil of The New Indian Express gave a rating of 2.5 of 5 and wrote that, "Innale Vare gives an average viewing experience due to the fact that the film is a predictable story for the audience. The film has brilliant performances by Asif Ali and Nimisha Sajayan. Cinematography, background music and other aspects of the film are excellent."

S. R Praveen of The Hindu said that, "Jis Joy's latest movie 'Innale Vare' aspires to be a dark and intelligent thriller, but fails on both counts."

Manorama News wrote that "Innale Vare is an awesome thriller with a cleanly written screenplay without much fuss. The strong performance of Asif Ali, Nimisha Sajayan and Antony Varghese is the strength of the movie".

Manjima Das of Leisure Byte said that "with an engaging story, interesting characters, crisp cinematography and editing, Jis Joy has offered the audiences a piece of dark thriller that is reflective and cautionary with its various themes".
