= Bicycle Thieves (2013 film) =

- Directed by: Jis Joy
- Screenplay by: Jis Joy
- Story by: Ajith Pillai
- Produced by: Dr. S. Sajikumar; Krishnan Sethukumar
- Starring: Asif Ali; Aparna Gopinath; Salim Kumar; Vijay Babu; Siddique; Saiju Kurup; Aju Varghese
- Cinematography: Binendra Menon
- Edited by: Ratheesh Raj
- Music by: Deepak Dev; Jerry Amaldev
- Production company: Dharmik films
- Distributed by: UTV Motion Pictures
- Release date: 29 November 2013
- Country: India
- Language: Malayalam

Bicycle Thieves is a 2013 Malayalam comedy thriller film written and directed by Jis Joy (in his directorial debut). It stars Asif Ali in the lead role alongside Aparna Gopinath with Salim Kumar, Saiju Kurup, Vijay Babu, Aju Varghese, Siddique, Sai Kumar, and Devan in other pivotal roles. It received mixed to positive reviews from critics.

== Summary ==
Chacko lost his parents in his childhood and he lives with uncle's family who tortures him and considers him a slave. Unable to face the struggle, he leaves in a bicycle and joins a cycle workshop owner Bose and his workers, Rameshan and Rahim who steals bicycles for a living. Their fate changes when they try to aim for more. A heist goes wrong, and the gang gets split. Chacko moves to another place where he continues with his tricks, on a bigger scale. During one of those endeavors, he meets Meera, a bank employee, and they fall in love.

The first half of the film is used to introduce each character, without divulging much details. The viewers are left to guess as they all could have a possible role in the suspense later on.

== Cast ==
- Asif Ali as Kunchacko (Chacko)
  - Dhananjay as Young Chacko
- Aparna Gopinath as Meera Mathews
- Salim Kumar as Bose Prakash alias Bossettan
- Vijay Babu as Adv. Kashinathan
- Saiju Kurup as Rameshan
- Siddique as CI
- Sunil Sukhada as Fa.Idayil Chodiyan
- Kishor Satya as Sleeve Varghese
- Jaffar Idukki as Sajeer Bhayi
- K. P. A. C. Lalitha as Meera's Landlady
- Bineesh Kodiyeri as Rahim
- Sai Kumar as Pattara Swami
- Devan as Mathews
- Aju Varghese as Shajan (cameo)
- Balu Varghese as Iqbal (cameo)
- Sekhar Menon as himself (cameo)
- Naveen Arakkal

== Soundtrack ==
Bicycle Thieves

Soundtrack album by Deepak Dev
- Genre: Film soundtrack
- Language: Malayalam

Deepak Dev chronology
Ezhamathe Varavu	Bicycle Thieves	7th Day

All tracks are composed by Deepak Dev and Jerry Amaldev and written by Bichu Thirumala, Kaithapram, and Jis Joy.

No.	Title	Performer(s)	Length
1.	"Aayiram Kannumaay (bit)"	Asif Ali
2.	"Mele Vaanile"	Ramya Nambeesan, Naveen
3.	"Punchiri Thanchum"	Shankar Mahadevan
4.	"Theme Song"	Naveen
