= I Love Me (film) =

- Theatrical poster
- Directed by: B. Unnikrishnan
- Written by: Sethu
- Produced by: Vyshakh Rajan
- Starring: Unni Mukundan; Asif Ali; Anoop Menon; Isha Talwar; Kadambari Jethwani
- Cinematography: Satheesh Kurup
- Edited by: Manoj
- Music by: Deepak Dev
- Distributed by: Vyshaka Cinema
- Release date: 21 December 2012
- Country: India
- Language: Malayalam

I Love Me is a 2012 Indian Malayalam-language thriller film directed by B. Unnikrishnan and written by Sethu. It stars Unni Mukundan, Asif Ali, Isha Talwar, with Anoop Menon and Kadambari Jethwani in supporting role. The film was shot in Vietnam, Bangkok and Kochi and was produced by Vaishak Rajan under the banner Vyshakha Cinemas. The film features a score and soundtrack composed by Deepak Dev. It is the first film directed by Unnikrishnan thar he did not write the script for.

== Plot ==
Ram Mohan, a high-profile businessman, brings two criminals – Xavi and Prem – from Kochi to Bangkok to kill a person, so that Ram can save his sinking business empire. The situation gets complicated when Samantha, a young lady enters the equation and Ram Mohan wants Xavi and Prem to kill each other.

== Cast ==
- Unni Mukundan as Xavi
- Asif Ali as Prem
- Anoop Menon as Ram Mohan
- Isha Talwar as Samantha
- Kadambari Jethwani as Susan
- Rupa Manjari as Sameera
- Vanitha Krishnachandran as Xavi's Mother
- Junaid Sheikh as Albert Lawrence
- Aniyappan as Krishnankutty
- Vijaya Kumar as Paul Alexander
- Biju Pappan as Maniyappan
- Indrans as Alves
- Joju George as Chacko
- Subi Suresh as Susan
- Sinosh Ekkilissery as Eto'o

== Production ==
The film was written by Sethu and directed by B. Unnikrishnan; it is the first film directed by him that he did not write the script for. Explaining the reasons for his decision, he says: "That is because I enjoyed the story that Sethu narrated to me. Moreover, I was looking for an opportunity to work with young actors and this script seemed just right for such an outing. Writing and directing can be tedious and time-consuming and I wanted to take a break from the responsibility of doing both." The film was shot in Vietnam, Bangkok, and Kochi.

== Reception ==
Veeyen of Nowrunning.com gave the film a negative rating of 2/5 and stated, "at a time when novel themes and experiments are filling our screens, this one just doesn't impress".
