= Dinjith Ayyathan =

Indian film director

- Born: Thalassery, Kannur district, Kerala, India
- Occupations: Film director, Screenwriter
- Years active: 2019–present
- Notable work: Kakshi: Amminippilla (2019), Kishkindha Kaandam (2024), Eko (2025)

Dinjith Ayyathan is an Indian film director, visual effects director, and screenwriter working in Malayalam film industry. His major works include the films Kakshi: Amminippilla (2019), Kishkindha Kaandam (2024) and Eko (2025).

== Early life and education ==
Dinjith Ayyathan hails from Kannur district, Kerala, India. According to him since childhood, he developed an interest in visual storytelling and entered the Malayalam film industry as a director.

== Career ==
Ayyathan made his directorial debut with Kakshi: Amminippilla in 2019. He gained further recognition with his second movie, Kishkindha Kaandam (2024), a mystery‑thriller film that established his narrative style in Malayalam cinema. His most recent film, Eko (2025), marked the continuation of his thematic work in thriller drama.

== Filmography ==
=== As director ===
Year	Title	Notes	References
2019	Kakshi: Amminippilla	Debut film	
2024	Kishkindha Kaandam	The first installment of Animal trilogy	
2025	Eko	The third installment of Animal trilogy	
