= Asif Ali (actor) =

Indian actor and film producer

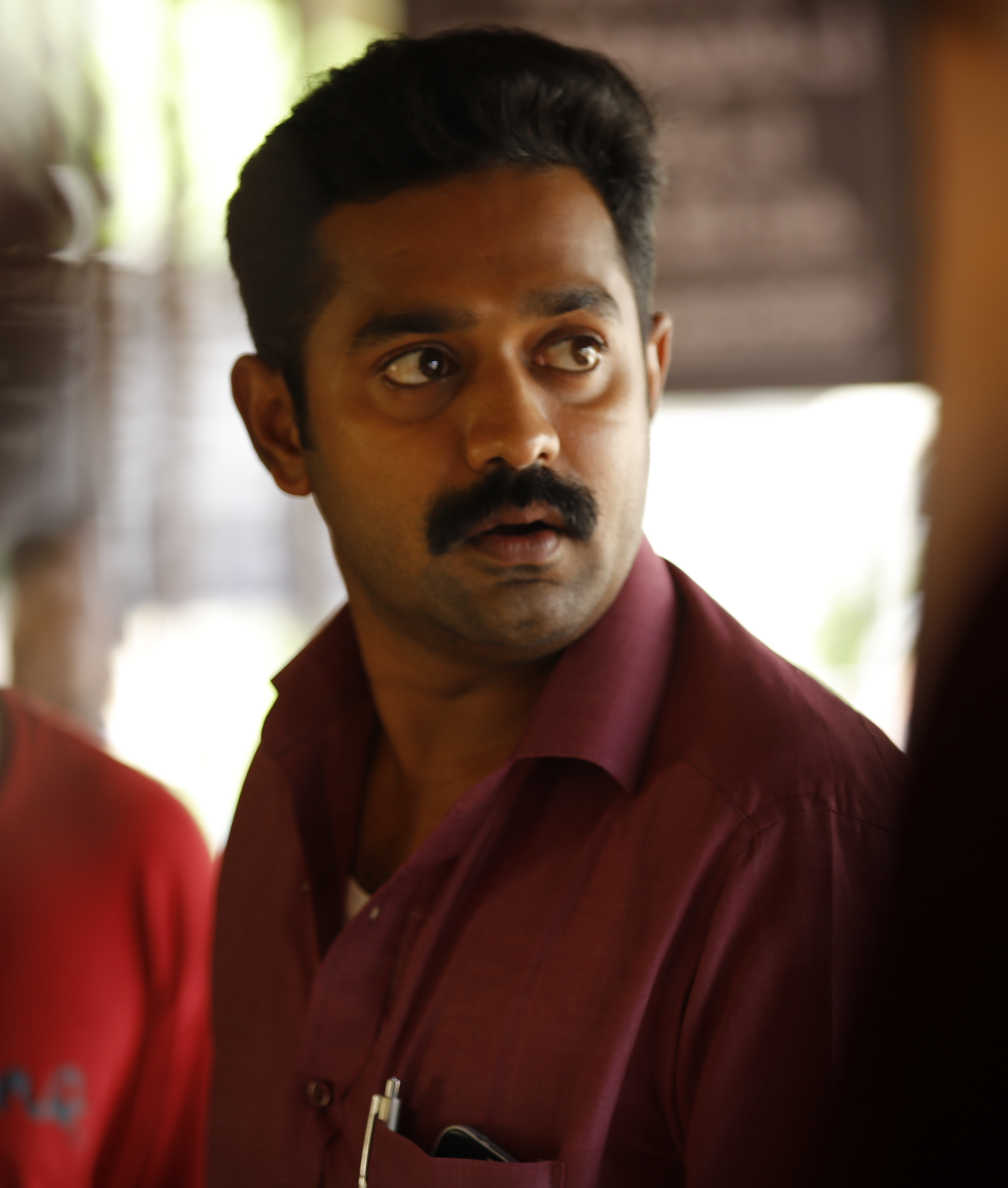
- Asif in 2018
- Born: 4 February 1986 (age 40); Thodupuzha, Kerala, India
- Education: Marian College, Kuttikkanam
- Occupations: Actor; producer
- Years active: 2009–present
- Spouse: Zama Mazreen Ali
- Children: 2
- Relatives: Askar Ali (brother)

Asif Ali (born 4 February 1986) is an Indian actor and producer, who works in the Malayalam film industry. He started his film career with Shyamaprasad's 2009 film, Ritu.

During the subsequent years Asif went on to act in critically and commercially successful films including the romantic thriller, Apoorvaragam, the road thriller film Traffic, the romantic comedy film Salt N' Pepper and the period drama movie Ozhimuri, which got an official selection in the Indian Panorama section of the 43rd International Film Festival of India. His 2013 film Honey Bee was one of the major hits in that year and his 2015 film Nirnayakam won the National Film Award for Best Film on Other Social Issues. His success streak continued by starring in the 2016 romantic movie Anuraga Karikkin Vellam, the 2017 movie Sunday Holiday, the campus thriller B.Tech (2018) and Vijay Superum Pournamiyum (2019), which produced a hat-trick of hits for him with Jis Joy. His performances in the films Kishkindha Kaandam and Level Cross earned him a special jury award at the Kerala State Film Awards.

He made his debut as a producer in the 2015 film Kohinoor under his production company Adam's World Of Imagination|Adam's World of Imagination, which went on to be a success. Later he produced the 2016 film Kavi Uddeshichath and distributed various films including Vimaanam and Iblis.

== Early life ==
Asif Ali was born in Karikode, Thodupuzha, Idukki, India on 4 February 1986. He obtained graduation degree from the Marian College, Kuttikkanam in Business Administration. While studying Asif modelled for ads and worked as a video jockey.

== Personal life ==
Asif married Zama Mazrin in 2013. They have two children.

== Acting career ==
He was selected by Shyamaprasad to play one of the lead roles in his film Ritu and received positive reviews from critics and audiences. He was then approached by Sathyan Anthikkad to play an important role in his film Kadha Thudarunnu. His third film was Apoorvaragam, directed by Sibi Malayil.

Since then, he had acted in the films Best of Luck and Traffic. His next film was Ithu Nammude Katha written and directed by Rajesh Kannankara. In 2011 Ali signed to appear in Aashiq Abu's second movie Salt N' Pepper in which he played the role of Manu Raghav, a carefree youngster character who often puts himself into awkward situations trying to be over friendly.

He played cameo roles in Doctor Love, Indian Rupee, Mallu Singh and Ustad Hotel. In 2013 he appeared In Jean Paul Lal's directorial debut, Honey Bee where he played the role of Sebastian which he followed with debutant Jis Joy's Bicycle Thieves. Ali sang four lines of the song "Aayiram Kannumaai", which was originally featured in Fazil's Nokkethadhoorathu Kannum Nattu.His next releases were Pakida, Mosayile Kuthira Meenukal and Hi I'm Tony. He played the role of Shabab in Sapthamashree Thaskaraha and had a cameo role in Vellimoonga.

In 2015 he appeared In Nirnayakam, Kohinoor and Rajamma @ Yahoo. His movie Anuraga Karikkin Vellam went on to become one of the Superhit of 2016. He reunited with Jean Paul Lal for Honey Bee 2. Sequel of 2013 Box office success Honey Bee. Then he appeared in Mahesh Naryanan's Take Off. The film was shot in various parts of Dubai and released to widespread critical acclaim. In 2018, his major releases were B Tech, Iblis and Mandharam. B Tech became a financial success, running for 100 days in Kerala.

He started the year 2019 with Vijay Superum Pournamiyum, which became a successful venture at box office. He played a critical role in the movie Uyare, which had Parvathy and Tovino Thomas playing other characters. He played another critical role in the film Virus, based on a true story that occurred in Calicut. He later acted in Nissam Basheer's directorial debut Kettyolaanu Ente Malakha, which was a box office success and gained critical acclaim. Director Lal Jose appraised it to be his career's best. In 2021, his appearances included Ellam Sheriyakum and Kunjeldho.

== Filmography ==
=== As an actor ===
Key
| † | Denotes films that have not yet been released |

| Year | Title | Role | Notes | Ref |
|---|---|---|---|---|
| 2009 | Ritu | Sunny Immatty | Debut film | |
| 2010 | Kadha Thudarunnu | Shanavas Ahammad | Extended Cameo | |
| 2010 | Apoorvaragam | Tomy | | |
| 2010 | Best of Luck | Manu | | |
| 2011 | Traffic | Rajeev | | |
| 2011 | Ithu Nammude Katha | Vinod / Appu | | |
| 2011 | Violin | Aby | | |
| 2011 | Salt N' Pepper | Manu Raghav | | |
| 2011 | Sevenes | Sooraj | | |
| 2011 | Doctor Love | Narrator | Cameo appearance | |
| 2011 | Indian Rupee | Land Broker | Cameo appearance | |
| 2012 | Asuravithu | Don Bosco | | |
| 2012 | Unnam | Aloshy | | |
| 2012 | Ordinary | Bhadran | | |
| 2012 | Mallu Singh | Harinder Singh | Cameo appearance | |
| 2012 | Bachelor Party | Tony | | |
| 2012 | Ustad Hotel | Himself | Cameo appearance | |
| 2012 | Ozhimuri | Sharath | | |
| 2012 | Husbands in Goa | Arjun | | |
| 2012 | Jawan of Vellimala | Koshi Oommen | | |
| 2012 | 916 | Prasanth | | |
| 2012 | Idiots | Messi | | |
| 2012 | Scene Onnu Nammude Veedu | Himself | Cameo appearance | |
| 2012 | I Love Me | Prem | | |
| 2013 | Cowboy | Vinay | 25th film | |
| 2013 | Kili Poyi | Chacko | | |
| 2013 | Red Wine | Ramesh | | |
| 2013 | Honey Bee | Sebastian/Seban | | |
| 2013 | D Company | Chinnan | Segment: "Oru Bolivian Diary 1995" | |
| 2013 | Bicycle Thieves | Kunchakko/Chacko | | |
| 2014 | Pakida | Aadhi | | |
| 2014 | Mosayile Kuthira Meenukal | Alex | | |
| 2014 | Hi I'm Tony | Sameer | | |
| 2014 | Apothecary | Prathapan | | |
| 2014 | Sapthamashree Thaskaraha | Shabab | | |
| 2014 | Vellimoonga | Josootty / Charlie | Cameo appearance | |
| 2014 | Mylanchi Monchulla Veedu | Anwar | | |
| 2015 | You Too Brutus | Abhi | | |
| 2015 | Nirnayakam | Ajay Siddharth | | |
| 2015 | Double Barrel | He | Cameo appearance | |
| 2015 | Kohinoor | Louis | | |
| 2015 | Amar Akbar Antony | Faizal | Cameo appearance | |
| 2015 | Rajamma @ Yahoo | Vishnu Yohannan / Yahoo | | |
| 2016 | Ithu Thaanda Police | Ramakrishnan | | |
| 2016 | Anuraga Karikkin Vellam | Abhilash | | |
| 2016 | Kavi Uddheshichathu..? | Kavalam Jimmy | | |
| 2017 | Honey Bee 2 | Sebastian | | |
| 2017 | Take Off | Faizal | Cameo appearance | |
| 2017 | Adventures of Omanakkuttan | Omanakuttan | | |
| 2017 | Avarude Raavukal | Aashik Abu / Aashik Pattavayal | 50th film | |
| 2017 | Sunday Holiday | Amal | | |
| 2017 | Thrissivaperoor Kliptham | Girija Vallabhan | | |
| 2017 | Honey Bee 2.5 | Himself | Cameo appearance | |
| 2017 | Kaattu | Nuhukkannu | | |
| 2018 | B Tech | Anand Subrahmaniam | | |
| 2018 | Iblis | Vaishakan | | |
| 2018 | Mandharam | Rajesh | | |
| 2019 | Vijay Superum Pournamiyum | Vijay | | |
| 2019 | Mera Naam Shaji | Shaji George | | |
| 2019 | Uyare | Govind Balakrishnan | | |
| 2019 | Virus | Vishnu Bhaskaran | | |
| 2019 | Unda | SI Rajan | Cameo appearance | |
| 2019 | Kakshi: Amminippilla | Adv. Pradeepan Manjodi | | |
| 2019 | Under World | Stalin John | | |
| 2019 | Kettyolaanu Ente Malakha | Sleevachan | | |
| 2021 | Mohan Kumar Fans | Himself | Cameo appearance | |
| 2021 | Aanum Pennum | Kuttikrishnan | Anthology film Segment: Rachiyamma | |
| 2021 | Ellam Sheriyakum | Vineeth | | |
| 2021 | Kunjeldho | Kunjeldho | | |
| 2022 | Kuttavum Shikshayum | CI Sajan Philip | | |
| 2022 | Innale Vare | Aadhi Shankar | | |
| 2022 | Mahaveeryar | Veerabhadran | | |
| 2022 | Kotthu | Shanu | | |
| 2022 | Rorschach | Dileep | (Extended Cameo) | |
| 2022 | Kooman | CPO Giri | | |
| 2022 | Kaapa | Anand Anirudh | | |
| 2023 | Maheshum Marutiyum | Mahesh | | |
| 2023 | 2018 | Nixon | | |
| 2023 | Kasargold | Alby | | |
| 2023 | Otta | S Hariharan | | |
| 2023 | A Ranjith Cinema | Ranjith | | |
| 2024 | Varshangalkku Shesham | John | Cameo appearance | |
| 2024 | Marivillin Gopurangal | Himself | Cameo appearance | |
| 2024 | Thalavan | SI/CI Karthik Vasudevan | | |
| 2024 | Level Cross | Raghu | | |
| 2024 | Adios Amigo | Prince | | |
| 2024 | Kishkindha Kaandam | Ajaychandran K.V | | |
| 2025 | Rekhachithram | CI Vivek Gopinath | | |
| 2025 | Sarkeet | Ameer Karuvandivalappil | | |
| 2025 | Aabhyanthara Kuttavaali | Sahadevan | | |
| 2025 | Mirage | Aswin | | |
| 2026 | I'm Game | A gambler | Cameo appearance | |
| 2026 | Pradhama Drishtiya Kuttakkar | Abraham | Cameo appearance | |
| 2026 | Tiki Taka † | John Denver | Post-Production | |
| 2027 | Kottayam Belt † | TBA | Post-Production | |
| 2027 | Mattancherry Mafia † | TBA | Pre-Production | |
| TBA | Houdini - The King of Magic † | TBA | Delayed | |

=== As producer ===
| Year | Film | Role | Director | Notes |
|---|---|---|---|---|
| 2015 | Kohinoor | Production | Vinay Govind | Debut Venture. Distributed by Time Ads |
| 2016 | Kavi Uddheshichath | Production; Distribution | Thomas; Liju Thomas | |
| 2017 | Honey Bee 2 | Distribution | Jean Paul Lal | |
| 2017 | Vimaanam | Distribution | Pradeep M. Nair | |
| 2017 | Goodalochana | Distribution | Thomas Sebastian | |
| 2018 | Iblis | Distribution | Rohith V.S | |

=== As playback singer ===
| Years | Film | Song | Ref |
|---|---|---|---|
| 2013 | Bicycle Thieves | Aayiram Kannumaay | |
| 2019 | Vijay Superum Pournamiyum | Pournami Superalleda | Co Singer With Vineeth Sreenivasan and Balu Varghese |

=== Television ===
| Year | Name | Role | Channel | Notes |
|---|---|---|---|---|
| 2020 | Comedy Stars season 2 | Himself | Asianet | Guest |
| 2023 | Geeta Govindam | Himself | Asianet | Cameo Appearance |
| 2024 | Manorathangal | Sunil Das | ZEE5 | Anthology series; Segment : Vilpana |
| 2025 | Bigg Boss Malayalam season 7 | Himself | Asianet | Guest |

== Awards and nominations ==
| Year | Award | Category | Film | Result | Ref |
|---|---|---|---|---|---|
| 2010 | Asianet Film Awards | Best Villain | Apoorvaragam | Won | |
| 2011 | Asianet Film Awards | Best Star Pair | Salt N' Pepper | Won | |
| 2016 | Asianet Film Awards | Best Star Pair along with Rajisha Vijayan | Anuraga Karikkin Vellam | Won | |
| 2019 | Asianet Film Awards | Performer of the Year | Various roles | Won | |
| 2015 | Kerala Film Critics Association Awards | Special Jury for Best Actor | Nirnayakam | Won | |
| 2017 | Vanitha Film Awards | Best Pair | Anuraga Karikkin Vellam | Won | |
| 2018 | Vanitha Film Awards | Best Pair | Sunday Holiday | Won | |
| 2020 | Vanitha Film Awards | Popular Actor | Various films | Won | |
| 2025 | Kerala State Film Awards | Special Jury award for Best Actor | Level Cross, Kishkindha Kaandam | Won | |

== See also ==
- Kannur Warriors FC
