= Eko (film) =

2025 Indian film

- Theatrical release poster
- Directed by: Dinjith Ayyathan
- Written by: Bahul Ramesh
- Produced by: M.R.K Jayaram
- Starring: Sandeep Pradeep; Biana Momin; Saurabh Sachdeva; Vineeth; Narain; Binu Pappu
- Cinematography: Bahul Ramesh
- Edited by: Sooraj E. S.
- Music by: Mujeeb Majeed
- Production company: Aaradyaa Studios
- Distributed by: Annapurna Studios; Dream Warrior Pictures; DreamZ Entertainment; The Plot Pictures; Lighter Buddha Films; Prathangira Cinemas; Black Ticket Entertainments; DMY Creations; Singapore Coliseum; Wanderblust Films
- Release date: 21 November 2025
- Running time: 125 minutes
- Country: India
- Language: Malayalam
- Budget: ₹5 crore
- Box office: ₹50 crore

Ekō (Note: Stylised as ekō, with the subtitle From The Infinite Chronicles Of Kuriachan) is a 2025 Indian Malayalam-language mystery crime thriller film directed by Dinjith Ayyathan and written and shot by Bahul Ramesh and produced by MRK Jhayaram under the banner Aaradyaa Studios (in their debut production). It serves as the third and final instalment of Bahul Ramesh’s Animal Trilogy, following Kishkindha Kaandam (2024) and Kerala Crime Files 2 (2025), starring Sandeep Pradeep, Biana Momin, Saurabh Sachdeva, Vineeth, Narain and Binu Pappu in prominent roles.

Principal photography began in April 2025 and concluded in mid-June 2025, with filming primarily taking place in the Idukki district of Kerala and also in Mangalore, Ooty and other parts of southern Karnataka and northern Kerala.

Ekō was released on 21 November 2025 to widespread acclaim from both critics and audiences. Made on a budget of ₹5 crore, it emerged as a major commercial success, grossing over ₹50 crore worldwide. After its OTT release, the film received even more acclaim than its theatrical release, with praise for the story, performances (mainly of Sandeep, Biana, and Narain), soundtrack, cinematography, editing, and plot depth.

== Plot ==
Mohan Pothan arrives at a lodge near the Kerala-Karnataka border, looking for the house of a friend named Kuriachan, a high-profile criminal who has gone missing. Appootty takes him by jeep to Kuriachan's remote estate in the Western Ghats, where Pothan tells him that his intention is to procure a rare dog breed that Kuriachan had brought from Malaysia many years ago and to attract the males of which he has brought a female Husky.

Kuriachan's Malaysian-origin wife, Mlaathi, lives in the estate with a househelp named Peeyoos. Peeyoos is visited by an unnamed man from Mangaluru claiming to be from the Navy, who says he was involved with Kuriachan but reveals nothing more. He offers Peeyoos a hefty reward for any information about Kuriachan. Mlaathi reveals to Peeyoos that her real name is Soyi. Kuriachan and Mohan Pothan had visited Soyi's house in British Malaya during World War II to study her husband's purebred dogs. After her husband's death in a Japanese attack, Soyi was trapped in her house as her husband's dogs never let her out of the house nor let anyone inside. Kuriachan saved Soyi by killing all the adult dogs, then Kuriachan married her and brought her home with him, along with the few pure-bred puppies who survived. Peeyoos immediately tells this to the man from the Navy, and Appootty reveals that Pothan had died and his dead body had been found, presumably fallen off the cliff, and the Husky seemed to have starved to death. Peeyoos is apprehended by Sukumaran and Soman, two loggers, who have discovered that Peeyoos's identity is fake. They allege that Peeyoos is after Kuriachan too, and suspect that he killed Mohan Pothan, whose actual intention was also finding Kuriachan. Peeyoos denies it, saying that though Peeyoos followed Mohan Pothan, it was a dog that pushed Pothan off the ledge.

The Navykkaran, who had been investigating in parallel, finds out the letters apparently from Kuriachan were sent by Appootty, who was tasked with sending them from various post offices by Kuriachan before he disappeared. He visits Mlaathi. Mlaathi tells Navy man that Pothan had visited her 6 years ago, one week prior to Kuriachan's disappearance, and that Pothan enquired about Kuriachan and left. Soon after, Pothan was arrested and subsequently in jail for 5-6 years. It is common knowledge that Kuriachan was behind Pothan's imprisonment in that case. Even though Mlaathi doesn't reveal anything more about Pothan's visit on that day, the audience are shown that Pothan had, in that visit, told Mlaathi that her Malaysian husband wasn't actually killed by the Japanese, but instead was framed and jailed by Kuriachan, and the duo had made up the story of his death so that Kuriachan could marry her. Pothan also went ahead to say Kuriachan had promised to share her with Pothan but went back on his word. Pothan also said that Kuriachan who loved dogs killed so many of them to save her not because of his love for her but because of his ego being shattered seeing the superior training which Mlaathi's Malaysian husband had given to his dogs. When Mlaathi questioned Kuriachan about this when he came home on the night of his disappearance, Kuriachan admitted to imprisoning her Malaysian husband but said he did it for love. In the present, the man from the Navy reveals that her househelp's identity is fake and he also could actually be Kuriachan's right-hand young man, who has done many crimes for Kuriachan.

Soman says he knows about a cave near the Karnataka border, and wonders if that cave was Kuriachan's rumoured hiding spot where he survives off food brought by his trained dogs. When the trio reach the spot of the supposed cave, Sukumaran and Soman reveal themselves to be undercover cops and attempt to arrest Peeyoos, whom they now realise to be Kuriachan's 'Bodyguard', Manikandan. In the ensuing scuffle with Peeyoos, Sukumaran gets stabbed to death and Peeyoos reveals that he was radicalised as a child after he saw the mangled remains of his parents who killed themselves in a bungled suicide bomb to the dying Soman, who got bitten by a snake.

Later, when Peeyoos comes back pretending to be returning from his hometown, Mlaathi tells Peeyoos that she has learned about his true identity as Kuriachan's trusted right-hand, and loyal as a dog. She asks whether he intends to harm her. He says no—at least, not until he has reason to. Mlaathi asks him what will he do if he has a reason to. He replies that some dogs have only one master, indicating his loyalty is only to Kuriachan.

Meanwhile, the Navykkaran from Mangalore begins to piece together the clues and recollect past incidents that point towards the twist: Kuriachan was never the master of the dogs—Mlaathi was. He suspects that Kuriachan would have indeed gone hiding 6 years ago in the supposed cave where dogs would guard the entrance and bring him fruits to survive, but his intention would have been to lie low for a few days and return, but he would have been trapped in this hiding spot, the cave, by Mlaathi's dogs. They might be bringing him food, but violently restricting him from escaping, essentially imprisoning him in that cave as part of Mlaathi's revenge and freedom. Peeyoos sees a bamboo utensil with some rice sticking to it. This might mean that Mlaathi has been sending food to Kuriachan via dogs.

Peeyoos also reflects on his own statement, and starts to realise the truth as he watches Mlaathi scanning the hills through her binoculars, that the dogs' one master is Mlaathi. As Peeyoos moves to get a knife from his bag to kill Mlaathi, he realises that he is surrounded by an angry horde of dogs, only kept in control by Mlaathi's presence. He comes to the realisation that he has also become a prisoner to Mlaathi's will, trapped by her dogs who watch his every move and breath. The film ends unclear as to whether Peeyoos will live, or become another chapter in Mlaathi's vengeance, leaving the ending ambiguous.

== Cast ==
- Sandeep Pradeep as Peeyoos / Manikandan
- Biana Momin as Soyi alias "Malaathikkari" / "Mlaathi Chettathi"
  - Sim Zhi Fei as young Soyi
- Saurabh Sachdeva as Kuriachan
- Vineeth as Mohan Pothan
- Narain as the unnamed Navy man
- Ashokan as Appootty
- Binu Pappu as Sukumaran
- Ranjith Shekhar as Soman
- Saheer Muhammed as Pappachan
- Ng Hung Shen as Yosiah, Soyi's first husband
- Jain Andrews as Joppan, Kurian and Soyi's younger son
- Sreelakshmi Meledath as Leena, Appootty's daughter and Peeyoos's girlfriend
- Rakesh Ushar as Doctor
- Sajad Bright as Shopkeeper
- A. Divakaran as Ration store owner
- Lissamma Thomas as Old Lady
- Hilda Saju as Appootty's wife
- Sivadas Poyilkav as Projector Operator
- Jithin Raj as Electric Lineman
- Adarsh Rajendran as Receptionist at Lodge

== Production ==
Eko̅ has director Dinjith Ayyath and writer–cinematographer Bahul Ramesh collaborating once again. The film's technical crew includes Mujeeb Majeed as the music composer, Sooraj E.S. as the editor, and Sajeesh Thamarassery as the art director.

The project is the first production under Aaradyaa Studios by MRK Jhayaram. Filming started in April 2025 and concluded by mid-June 2025. The film released on 21 November 2025.

== Release ==
=== Theatrical ===
The film had a worldwide theatrical release in 21 November 2025 in EPIQ formats clashing with Vilayath Buddha.

=== Home media ===
The film began streaming on Netflix from 31 December 2025.

== Reception ==
Sanjay Ponnappa of India Today described the film as "a slow-paced thriller that lands a strong final twist." Prathyush Parasuraman of The Hollywood Reporter India called it "one of the year's most accomplished, immersive films." Sajin Srijith of The Week labelled it "a truly outstanding triumph of mystery storytelling." Swathi P Ajith of Onmanorama stated that the film "feels more like a long walk through a foggy forest where every turn reveals something new." Goutham S of Pinkvilla described it as "a riveting mystery thriller that redefines the thin line between protection and restriction."

Dhanya K Vilayil of The Indian Express praised it as "an international-level Malayalam film." Richa Barua of Asianet Newsable called it "an unpredictable mystery thriller." S.R. Praveen of The Hindu gave the film a positive review calling it a "solid mystery thriller" and praised the technical aspects of the film. Jay in Medium gave the film a positive review, calling it "a gripping study of guilt, silence, and shifting power, built on cleverly crafted flashbacks and a devastating moment of reckoning."

== Awards ==
At the 2025 Padmarajan Awards, the film received two awards; Dinjith Ayyathan won the award for Best Director and Bahul Ramesh won the award for Best Screenwriter. The film also received the award for Best Film at the 49th Kerala Film Critics Association Awards.
