= Deepak Dev =

Indian composer

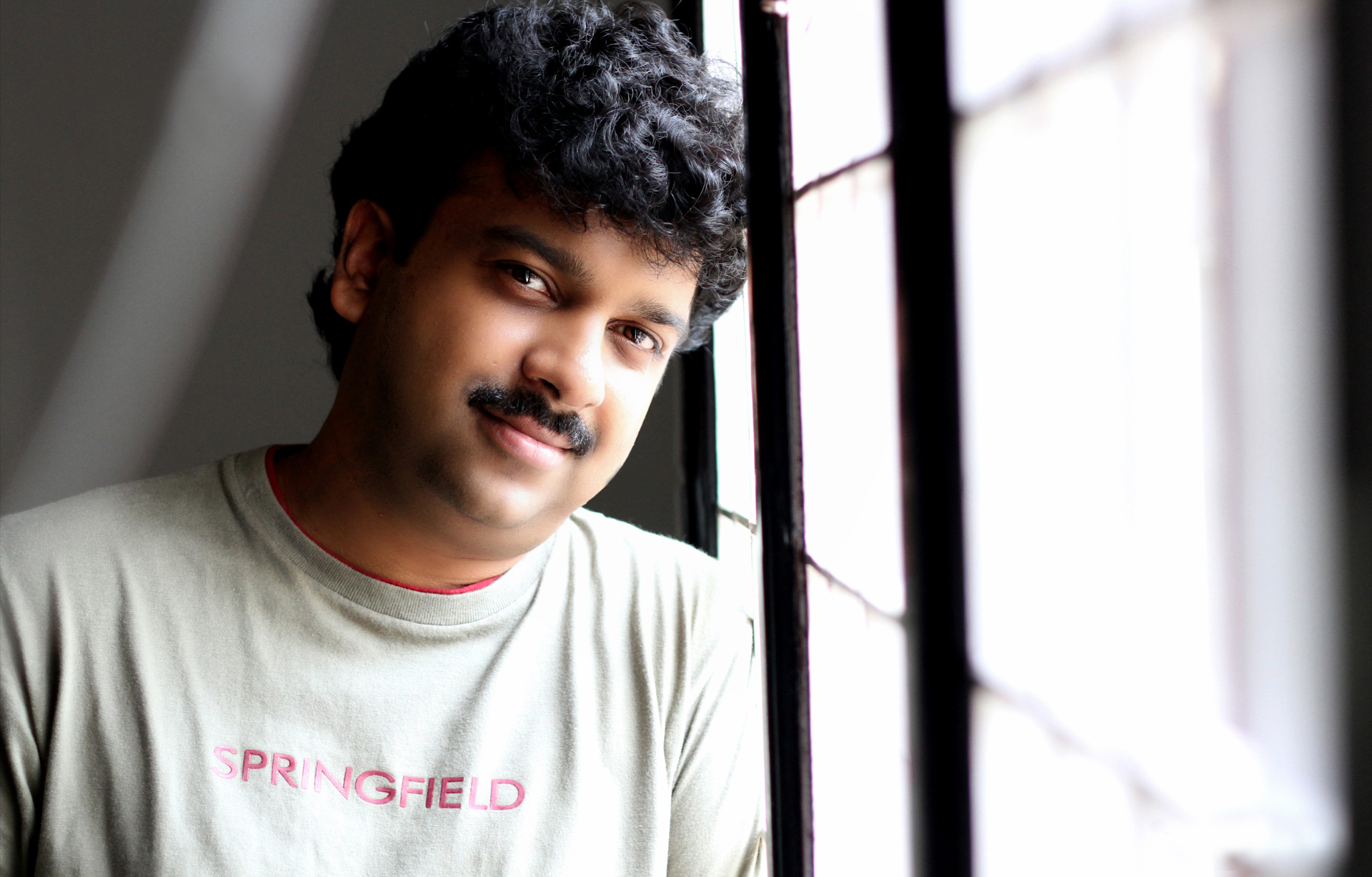
- Deepak in 2011

Background information
- Born: Deepak Devraj Komath; 30 April 1978 (age 48); Thalassery, Kerala, India
- Occupations: composer; Music director; Record producer; Singer; Music Programmer; Instrumentalist
- Years active: 2003–present
- Spouse: Smitha Girijan (m. 2002)
- Musical career
- Genres: Film score; Soundtrack; World music; Indi-pop; Dance music; Classical music
- Instruments: Keyboards, vocals
- Labels: Satyam Audios; Manorama Music; Millenium Audios; Muzik 247; Goodwill Entertainments
- Formerly of: Motherjane
- Website: www.deepakdev.in

Deepak Devraj Komath (born 30 April 1978), better known as Deepak Dev, is an Indian composer, best known for his compositions in Malayalam cinema. He started his career in the film Industry through the movie Chronic Bachelor (2003) directed by Siddique. Deepak is also a former member of the Kochi based Indian rock band Motherjane.

== Early years ==
Deepak Dev is a native of Thalassery in Kerala, and grew up in Dubai. He studied at the Indian High School there and learned Indian Carnatic music since childhood. Later his interest switched mainly to the keyboard. While a graduate student in Sacred Heart College, he was the mastermind behind the college rock band which went on to win the intercollege competition 'Talent Time – Woodstock' award every year. He focused on programming music and started working with reputed musicians like A.R Rahman, Shankar-Ehsaan-Loy, Sandeep Chowta, Vidyasagar, Anu Malik, M.M. Keeravani, Mani Sharma, M. Jayachandran and Aadesh Shrivastava.

He started his career in Malayalam movies with Chronic Bachelor, directed by Siddique (of Siddique-Lal fame).

He said in an interview that he had almost given up on his musical career, soon after completing his graduation from Sacred Heart's College, Kochi, "as nothing exciting was happening in my career." However, every time he tried to sell his keyboard, it always came back to him, "as any guy who bought it from me with a mere small advance could never pile up the money that they had promised me for that keyboard and ended up giving it back to me. And soon after the third time it happened, the Siddique-Lal duo called me to join their group for their shows in the United States. They wanted me to render some music to fill the time in-between programs. As I got a chance to visit America, my intention was to get some job in the States like marketing, sales or anything other than music. During that time Mr.Siddique heard my composition and told me that 'I have good talent in music and I must take music as my career' Eventually, it was those words gave me courage to take music as my career. "After that I came back to India I shifted base from Kerala to Chennai, that was in 1999. After few years I met Siddique and he asked me to compose music for his movie 'Chronic Bachelor', my first film".

== Personal life ==
Deepak was born to Devraj Komath and Asha Dev based in Thalassery, who now live in Dubai. He has a younger brother, Dixit Dev. He was educated at The Indian High School, Dubai and at Sacred Heart College, Thevara. Deepak married Smitha Girijan on 26 May 2002. The couple now live in Ernakulam with their two daughters, Devika (born 2003) and Pallavi (born 2006).

== Discography ==
=== As a composer ===
Key
†	Denotes films that have not yet been released

Year	Film	Language	Songs	Score	Notes
2003	Chronic Bachelor	Malayalam	Yes	Yes	
2004	Symphony	Malayalam	Yes	Yes	
2005	Udayananu Tharam	Malayalam	Yes	No	Vanitha Film Award for Popular Song.
2005	Naa Oopiri	Telugu	Yes	Yes	
2005	Naran	Malayalam	Yes	No	
2005	Ben Johnson	Malayalam	Yes	No	
2006	Lion	Malayalam	Yes	No	
2006	Kilukkam Kilukilukkam	Malayalam	Yes	No	
2006	Rashtram	Malayalam	Yes	No	
2006	Yes Your Honour	Malayalam	Yes	No	
2007	The Speed Track	Malayalam	Yes	No	
2007	Kaakki	Malayalam	Yes	Yes	
2008	Sadhu Miranda	Tamil	Yes	Yes	
2009	Puthiya Mugham	Malayalam	Yes	Yes	Asianet Film Award for Best Music Director
2009	Rahasya Police	Malayalam	No	Yes	
2010	Drona 2010	Malayalam	Yes	No	
2010	Tournament	Malayalam	Yes	No	
2011	Christian Brothers	Malayalam	Yes	No	
2011	Urumi	Malayalam	Yes	Yes	Kerala State Film Award for Best Background Score
2011	Teja Bhai & Family	Malayalam	Yes	Yes	
2012	Padmasree Bharat Dr. Saroj Kumar	Malayalam	Yes	No	
2012	Cobra	Malayalam	No	Yes	
2012	Grandmaster	Malayalam	Yes	Yes	
2012	101 Weddings	Malayalam	Yes	Yes	
2012	Chettayees	Malayalam	Yes	Yes	
2012	I Love Me	Malayalam	Yes	Yes	
2013	Ladies and Gentleman	Malayalam	No	Yes	
2013	Aaru Sundarimaarude Katha	Malayalam	Yes	Yes	
2013	Honey Bee	Malayalam	Yes	Yes	
2013	Ezhamathe Varavu	Malayalam	No	Yes	
2013	Bicycle Thieves	Malayalam	Yes	Yes	
2014	7th Day	Malayalam	Yes	Yes	
2014	Gangster	Malayalam	Yes	Yes	
2014	Ithihasa	Malayalam	Yes	Yes	
2014	Hi I'm Tony	Malayalam	Yes	Yes	
2014	Avatharam	Malayalam	Yes	Yes	
2015	Bhaskar the Rascal	Malayalam	Yes	Yes	
2015	Lavender	Malayalam	Yes	Yes	
2015	Amar Akbar Anthony	Malayalam	Yes	Yes	
2015	Swargathekkal Sundaram	Malayalam	No	Yes	
2015	Chirakodinja Kinavukal	Malayalam	Yes	Yes	
2016	Jaadayum Mudiyum	Malayalam	Yes	Yes	Short film
2016	King Liar	Malayalam	Yes	Yes	
2017	Honey Bee 2: Celebrations	Malayalam	Yes	Yes	
2017	Sunday Holiday	Malayalam	Yes	Yes	
2017	Adam Joan	Malayalam	Yes	No	
2017	Kaattu	Malayalam	Yes	Yes	
2017	Masterpiece	Malayalam	Yes	Yes	
2019	Lucifer	Malayalam	Yes	Yes	
2019	Vallikudilile Vellakkaran	Malayalam	Yes	Yes	
2019	Ittymaani: Made in China	Malayalam	Yes	Yes	
2019	Ganagandharvan	Malayalam	Yes	Yes	
2020	Big Brother	Malayalam	Yes	Yes	
2020	Yogi Da	Tamil	Yes	Yes	Unreleased film
2022	Bro Daddy	Malayalam	Yes	Yes	
2022	Twenty One Gms	Malayalam	Yes	Yes	
2022	Djibouti	Malayalam	Yes	Yes	
2022	Monster	Malayalam	Yes	Yes	
2022	My Name Is Azhakan	Malayalam	Yes	No	
2024	Thalavan	Malayalam	Yes	Yes	
2024	Idiyan Chandhu	Malayalam	Yes	Yes	
2025	L2: Empuraan	Malayalam	Yes	Yes	

=== As a singer ===
Year	Song	Album	Singers	Composer
2005	"Munpe Munpe"	Ben Johnson	Deepak Dev, Arjun	Deepak Dev
2005	"Udayananu Tharam"	Udayananu Tharam	Ranjith Govind, Deepak Dev	Deepak Dev
2006	"Nerathe Kalathethi"	Speed Track	Deepak Dev, Jassie Gift, George Peter	Deepak Dev
2009	"Thattum Muttum"	Puthiya Mukham	Jassie Gift, Sindhu Rajaram, Deepak Dev	Deepak Dev
2010	"Manassil"	Tournament	Naresh Iyer, Deepak Dev, Megha	Deepak Dev
2011	"Pranaya Nilaa" (Remix)	Teja Bhai & Family	Shaan Rahman, Deepak Dev, Aalaap Raju, Rahul Nambiar	Deepak Dev
2012	"Cheruchillayil"	101 Weddings	Vidyasagar, Deepak Dev	Deepak Dev
2013	"Kannil Aayiram"	Aaru Sundarimaarude Katha	Suchith Suresan, Akhila Anand, Deepak Dev	Deepak Dev
2013	"Machane Machane Machu"	Honey Bee	Deepak Dev, Sreecharan, Vinod Varma	Deepak Dev
2014	"Pandan Nayude"	Beware of Dogs	Jecin George, Deepak Dev	Bijibal
2014	"Ambada Njaane Chellada Mone"	Ithihasa	Deepak Dev, Lonely Doggy, Sannidanandan	Deepak Dev
2014	"Irul Moodumi"	7th Day	Deepak Dev	Deepak Dev

== Awards ==
Year	Award	Category	Film/Album/Song
2019	Mazhavil Music Awards	Best Background Score	Lucifer
2011	Kerala State Film Award	Best Background Score	Urumi
2009	Asianet Film Award	Best Music Director	Puthiya Mukham
2006	Vanitha Film Award	Best Music Director	Udayananu Tharam

== Television shows ==
Title	Role	Channel
Super star	Judge	Amrita TV
Super Star Junior	Judge	Amrita TV
Super Star Junior 2	Judge	Amrita TV
Super Star 2	Judge	Amrita TV
Super star 3	Judge	Amrita TV
Super star Junior 3	Judge	Amrita TV
Gandharva sangeetham	Judge	Kairali TV
Super Star Junior 4	Judge	Amrita TV
Music Mojo Season 2	Band singer	Kappa TV
Music Mojo Season 3	Band singer	Kappa TV
Bhima Music India	Judge	Asianet
Super 4	Judge	Mazhavil Manorama
Wonder Kids	Judge	Asianet
Top singer 2	Judge	Flowers
Music Ulasavam	Judge	Flowers
Star Night	Judge	Flowers
Eenangalude Gandharvan	Judge	Flowers
Sa Re Ga Ma Pa Keralam 3	Judge	Zee Keralam
Top Singer 7	Judge	Flowers TV
