= Sunday Holiday =

Malayalam movie

- Theatrical release poster
- Directed by: Jis Joy
- Written by: Jis Joy
- Story by: Kiran. V.S. Urasu
- Produced by: Sheen Helen
- Starring: Asif Ali; Aparna Balamurali; Shruthi Ramachandran; Sreenivasan; Asha Sarath; Siddique; Dharmajan Bolgatty; Lal Jose
- Cinematography: Alex J. Pulikkal
- Edited by: Ratheesh Raj
- Music by: Deepak Dev
- Production company: MAQTRO Motion Pictures
- Distributed by: MAQTRO Motion Pictures
- Release date: 14 July 2017
- Running time: 135 minutes
- Country: India
- Language: Malayalam

Sunday Holiday is a 2017 Indian Malayalam-language romantic comedy-drama film written and directed by Jis Joy, based on a story by Kiran. V.S and Urasu. The film features an ensemble cast including Asif Ali, Aparna Balamurali, Shruthi Ramachandran, Sreenivasan, Asha Sarath, Siddique, Dharmajan Bolgatty, Lal Jose, Bhagath Manuel, Alphy Panjikkaaran and Alencier Ley Lopez. The music was composed by Deepak Dev. The film was released on 14 July 2017, and received positive reviews from critics. The film became a commercial success.

== Plot ==
The film is about a cinema tale, narrated by Unni Mukundan to a famous director David Paul. Unni is a college professor who dreams of becoming a scriptwriter for films. Unni first gets rejected quite harshly, but then David regrets his actions and calls him back, asking him to narrate the story.

Unni narrates the story of Amal from Payyannur. Amal's love story with Sithara met with an unexpected ending as she accepted a marriage proposal. He decides to go to Ernakulam for a job so that he can stay away from his past. He shares a house with V. P. Vipeesh aka Rahul, Vinu and Narayanankutty aka Nakkutty. During this phase, Amal meets Anu a medical student and eventually falls in love with her. Anu reciprocates his feelings as she is saved by Amal when a person tries to abuse her. They decide to get married leaving Sithara fuming in jealousy.

The director loves the story and agrees to make the film. The climax reveals that Unni was narrating his own life story.

== Cast ==
- Asif Ali as Amal
- Aparna Balamurali as Anu
- Shruthi Ramachandran as Sithara
- Sreenivasan as Unni Mukundan, An aspiring film writer
- Siddique as Narayanankutty Varavelil/ Nakkutty
- Asha Sarath as Dr. Sreedhanya
- Dharmajan Bolgatty as Rahul / V. P. Vipeesh
- Lal Jose as David Paul, film director
- Alencier as Sudhakaran / Amal's father
- Alphy Panjikaran as Amal's sister
- Bhagath Manuel as J. K.
- Nirmal Palazhi as Vinu
- Sudheer Karamana as Benny
- K. P. A. C. Lalitha as Benny's mother
- Preetha Pradeep as Benny's Wife
- Kalasala Babu as Unni's father
- Pradeep Kottayam as Church Visitor
- Sethu Lakshmi as Astrologer
- Meghanathan as S.I. Shafeeque K. V.
- Vinaya Prasad as Narayanankutty's wife
- V. K. Sreeraman as Abdul Salam Hajiyar
- Ann Benjamin as Haseena, Hajiyar's daughter / Anu's friend
- Thesni Khan as Shilpa
- Shivaji Guruvayoor as Lonappan
- Aliyar as himself, dubbing artist
- Athira Patel as Unni's Daughter
- Nandana Varma as Unni's Daughter
- Vidhya Vijayakumar as Amrita
- Fr. Bobby Jose Kattikad as himself
- Nasser Latif as Sithara's uncle
- Praveen Parameswar as Ad Film Director
- Remya Panicker as Ruby
- Jis Joy as a man in bus (cameo appearance)

== Soundtrack ==
Sunday Holiday

Soundtrack album by Deepak Dev
- Released: 16 June 2017
- Recorded: 2017
- Genre: Feature film soundtrack
- Label: Sathyam Audios

Deepak Dev chronology
| Honey Bee2 (2017) | Sunday Holiday (2017) | Adam (2017) |

All lyrics are written by Jis Joy; all music is composed by Deepak Dev.

| No. | Title | Artist(s) | Length |
|---|---|---|---|
| 1. | "Mazha Paadum" | Arvind Venugopal, Aparna Balamurali | 4:24 |
| 2. | "Oru Nokku Kaanuvan" | Karthik | 4:48 |
| 3. | "Aaro Koode" | Prakash Babu, Jyotsna Radhakrishnan |
| 4. | "Kando Ninte Kannil" | Anwar Sadath | 3:52 |

== Release ==
=== Theatrical ===
Sunday Holiday was released in India on 14 July 2017 in 110 theatres across Kerala.

== Reception ==
=== Critical reception ===
The Times of India reviewer Deepa Soman rated it 3 out of 5 stars and stated, "Sunday Holiday is a perceptive portrait of a film and that makes it quite unpretentious and feel-good too, which makes it worth your time."
