= Navarasa (disambiguation) =

Navarasa (the nine emotions), in India's performing arts traditions, are the nine emotions evoked in an audience.

Navarasa may also refer to:

- Navarasa (film), a 2005 Indian Tamil-language film directed by Santosh Sivan
  - Navarasa (soundtrack), the soundtrack for the series
- Navarasa (TV series), a 2021 Indian Tamil-language anthology series created by Mani Ratnam
- Navarasa, an Indian film series in Malayalam by Jayaraj, including:
  - Shantham (lit. 'Peace', 2000)
  - Karunam (lit. 'Mercy', 2000)
  - Bhibatsa (lit. 'Disgust', 2002)
  - Adbutham (lit. 'Wonder', 2005)
  - Veeram (lit. 'Hero', 2016)
  - Bhayanakam (lit. 'Horror', 2018)
  - Roudram 2018 (lit. 'Anger', 2019)
  - Hasyam (lit. 'Laughter', 2020)
- Navarasa: Nine Emotions, a 2020 album by Yorkston/Thorne/Khan

== See also ==
- Navarasam (album), 2015 album by the Indian band Thaikkudam Bridge
- Navarasan, Indian film director and actor
- Navras, 2003 song by Juno Reactor and Don Davis
