= Great flood of 99 =

Flood which occurred in 1924 in Kerala

In the Great flood of '99 the Periyar River in Kerala state of India flooded in July 1924. This happened in the year 1099 ME in the Malayalam Calendar (Kollam Era), and as the Malayalam calendar was popular in Kerala, the flood is generally referred to as "The Great flood of "99". The rain continued for about three weeks. Many districts of present-day Kerala were submerged under deep flood waters - from Thrissur, to Ernakulam to Idukki, Kottayam even up to Alappuzha and Kuttanad. A huge mountain called Karinthiri Mala was washed away by this flood and the road to Munnar also went along with it. As the road to Munnar was swept away by this flood, a new road from Ernakulam to Munnar became necessary - the present day road from Ernakulam to Munnar was constructed after this. Kundala Valley Railway which was the first monorail system in India was also completely destroyed. Various remnants of the old Railway systems still exist at Munnar.

== Cause ==
Kerala state received unprecedented rains during the month of July 1924. Kerala received 3,368 mm of rain during the monsoon season (June to September), 64 percent higher than normal and is the highest recorded rainfall. The flood was probably caused by offshore vortices along the west coast and perturbations higher up in the troposphere and is not attributed to any depression or cyclonic disturbance in the Arabian Sea or the bay of Bengal.

The rivers in the state were in spate and a sudden opening of the Periyar sluices caused even greater misery. The restriction in flow due to swelling of the Periyar river, blockages formed by debris, changes in the river flow and other related reasons caused flooding even in places like Munnar which is 1500m above sea level.

A letter from P. John John, owner of tea estates, to the land revenue commissioner stated: "During the last floods my tea estates, Karimkulam and Karimtharuvi, sustained heavy losses and I herewith enclose a statement showing the losses. This was mainly due to the indiscriminate working of the sluice valves of the Mullaperiyar Dam without giving any previous warning. The rainfall all over the country and especially in the Peermade District was unprecedented and the river was already in flood due to these rains and the partial opening of the sluice valves. Then it is said that the authorities found the water level in the lake had risen much over the maximum limit and they opened the sluices to the full height thereby flushing the river.

== Aftermath ==
The destructive flood claimed at least 1,000 lives, many animals and birds, and caused severe damages to the crops and property in Kerala. Most of the areas in the erstwhile Travancore and Cochin states, parts of Malabar region were submerged under the floodwater.

In Munnar around 485mm of rain fall was reported during the flood and wide spread destruction happened. The old Aluva-Munnar route through Kothamangalam-Kuttampuzha-Mankulam was made unusable due to landslides (although the road was reconstructed till Pooyamkutty), and was completely abandoned, making the tribal village of Edamalakkudy very remote by allowing thick forests to grow in the area. Kundala Valley Railway the narrow gauge railway line at Munnar was completely destroyed by the landslides and flood waters.

Official Travancore records says that Aluva- Perumbavoor Road was submerged up to 10 feet of water for the entire stretch.

"By early August, thousands of refugees and displaced families were being fed at different relief centres: 4000 at Ambalapuzha, 3000 at Alleppey, 5000 in Kottayam, 3000 in Changanassery, 8000 in Parur and so on," writes Devan T. Raghavaiah, a civil servant deputed by the Madras presidency.

This flood is still a fearful memory with the old generation still alive in Kerala - most of them were kids then. "The significance of the flood was such that many old people in Travancore used to anchor their memories in relation to the flood," writes historian Meenu Jacob. Several church buildings were destroyed, which meant that the present-day church records in these churches start from 1924.

== Reports ==
It is astonishing that the Munnar region, located about 6000 feet above the sea level was also submerged under floodwater- reference from the website of Kerala Government -

"As Trichur Town center was planned well, during the flood of 1924 A.D. (the biggest flood Thrissur have ever seen), the locals of thrissur town went to neighboring places to see the "flood" as per the elders.." -

"The flood of 1924 (ME 1099) is said to have ruined the road to Munnar due to the catastrophic landslide at Karinthiri. During the flood in the year 1924 AD (23 July 1924), the route was damaged due to landslides at Karinthiri near Munnar. Since then, the road was not used and an alternate route from Kothamangalam was conceived and constructed. The new route was constructed through the alignment recommended by the then British surveyor, Mr. Valetine through Neriamangalam, Mannamkandam, Pallivasal to Munnar. This was the route through which the elephants trespass. This road was completed in 1931 and inaugurated by Regent Queen Sethulakshmibai on 31 March the same year. The inauguration ceremony was organized at Ranikkallu near Neriamangalam. The general manager of Kannan Devan Tea Estate, Mr. Wallace invited the queen to declare the road open" Kunjithomman, Elenjical, Kothamangalam made a long speech in this occasion."

Mr. K. Thanu Pillai, Executive Engineer, says in his report of 19 July 1924: "The night of the 16th was an awful one for the town of Alwaye, especially its low lying suburbs. Cries of help were heard from all sides, The limited number of boats, public and private, could hardly cope with the rescue of lives, not to speak of property.. The current set up by the river overflowing its banks was so powerful that many boats engaged in rescue work are reported to have capsized. The roll of casualty is also said to be considerable but the exact number of casualties and the magnitude of the destruction and challenge caused by this unprecedented flood could not be known until the flood subsides. The flood reached its zenith on the afternoon of the 17th, it having risen nearly 6 ft. above the recorded M. F. L. it the local Railway bridge. Nearly a foot of the deep railway girder was also submerged. The flood began to subside from the evening of the 17th."

== In popular culture ==
The short story "Vellapokkathil" by Thakazhi Sivasankara Pillai is set against the backdrop of the great flood and was inspired by the author's childhood experience during the flood. In 2007, Jayaraj adapted Pillai's story into a short film of the same name.

in the Malayalam movie Oru CBI Diary Kurippu, the maid named Mary mentions she was born during the great flood of 1099.

== Image Links ==
- A Railway Station Head Quarters collapsed in the flood
- A view of the 1924 Flood from Munnar
- Idukki Rainfall information for 15 to 18 July 1924
- Report on Alwaye

== See also ==
- 1341 Floods in Kerala
- 2018 Kerala floods
- Kerala floods
