= Babykuttan Thoolika =

Indiandramatist and play writer

Babykuttan Thoolika(T.K.Gopinatha Kurup)
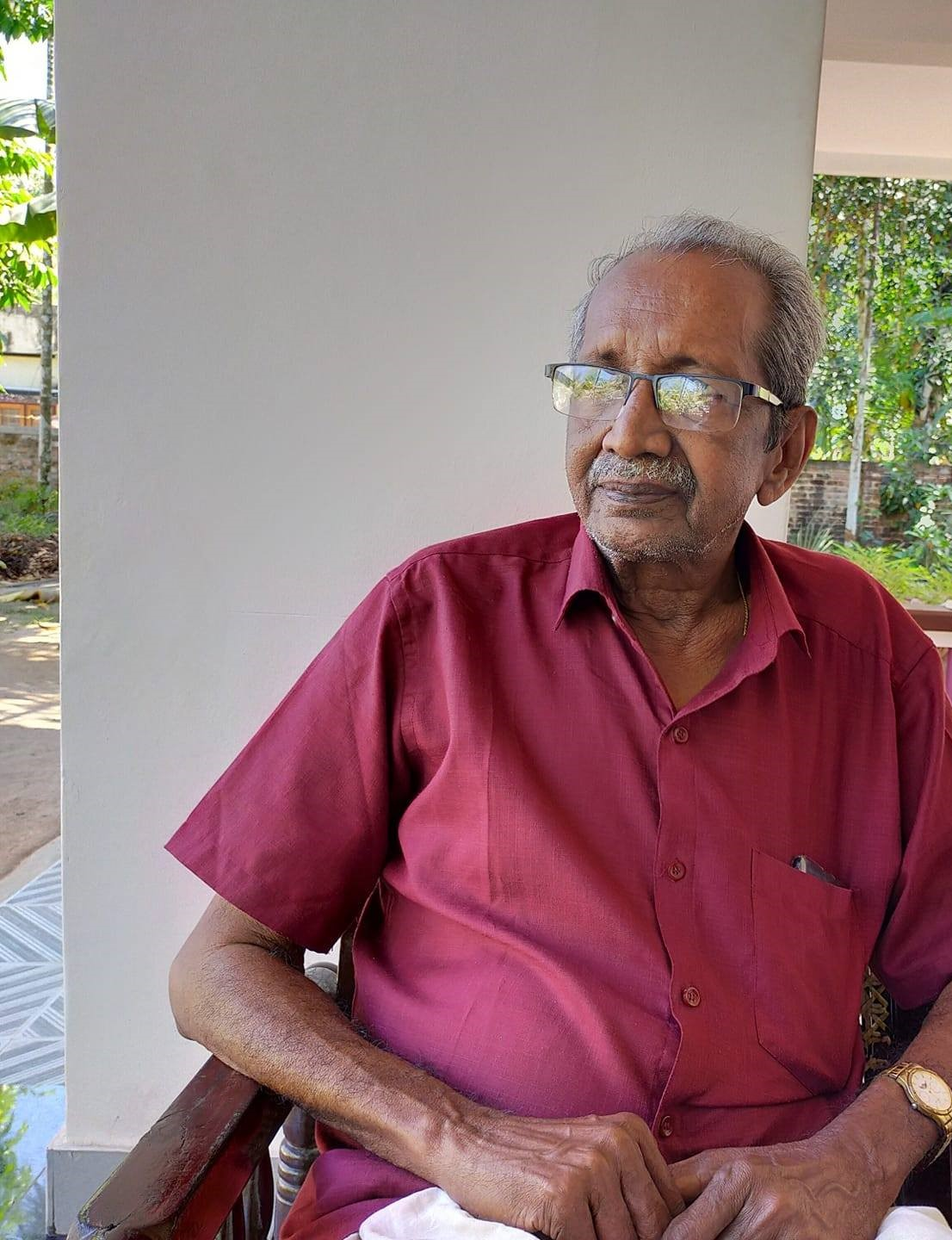
- Born: 15 September 1945; Thevalakkara, Kollam, Travancore (present-day Kerala, India)
- Occupations: Drama director, producer, writer, poet, artist, and song writer
- Spouse: Rema Devi Meenakshi Amma
- Parent(s): Thevalakkra Kunjan Pillai; Kamalamma Pillai
- Writing career
- Pen name: Babykuttan Thoolika
- Notable awards: 2002 Kerala Sangeetha Nataka Academi Award (C. I. Parameswaran Pillai Memorial Endowment Award).; 1983 Kerala State Award for Professional Plays, Best Playwright-Layavinyasam

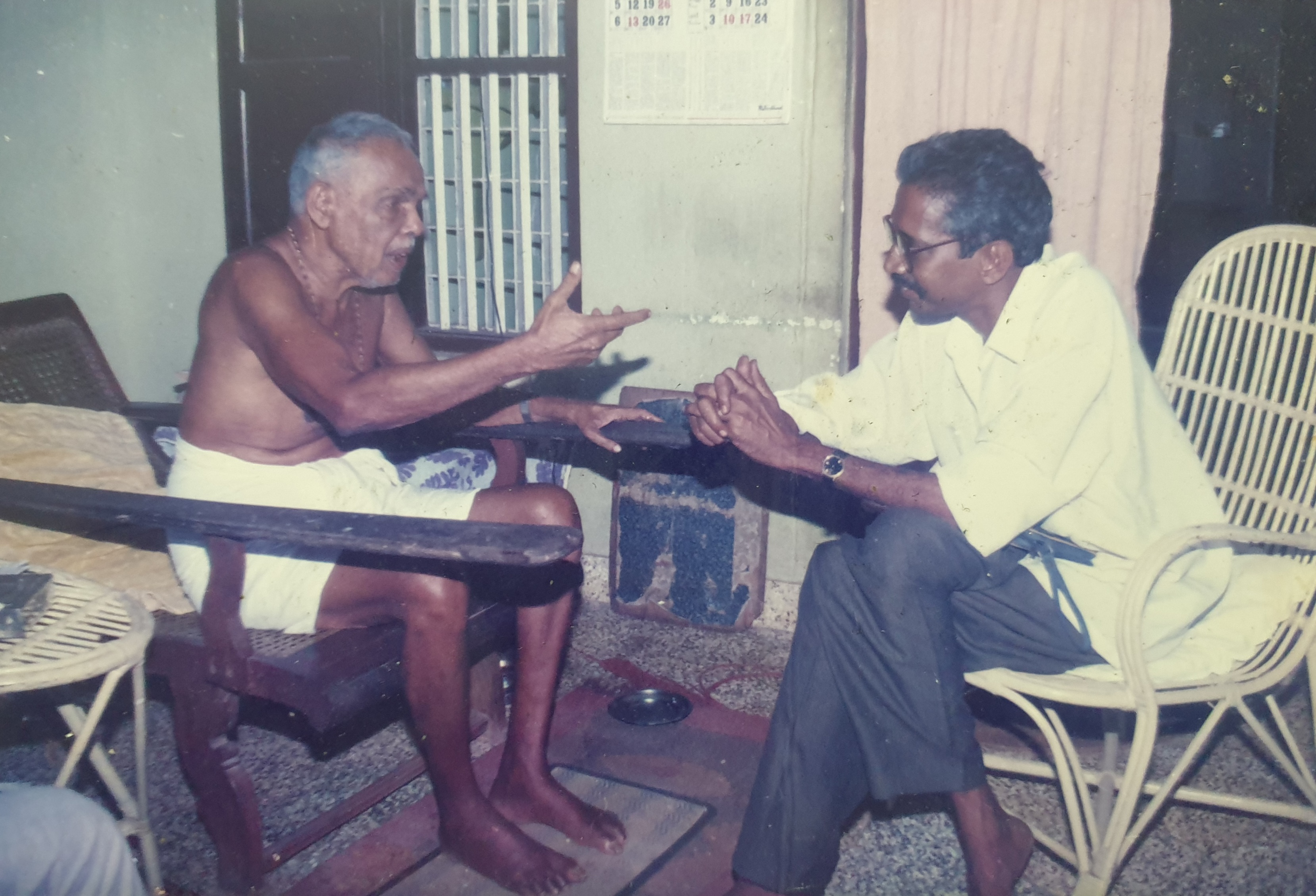
Thakazhi Sivasankara Pillai and Babykuttan Thoolika discussing about Chemmeen.

T. K. Gopinatha Kurup (15 September 1945 in Thevalakkara, Kerala), also known by his pen name Babykuttan Thoolika, is an Indian drama director, producer, writer, poet, artist, and songwriter.

Babykuttan began his career in the field of drama and theater in the 1960s, and quickly made a name for himself as a talented and versatile artist. He wrote and directed numerous plays, many of which were critically acclaimed and won awards. As a writer, Babykuttan's works were known for their social relevance and thought-provoking themes. As a director, Babykuttan was known for his ability to bring out the best in his actors and for his innovative use of stage design and lighting, Chemmeen drama version clearly is a proof for it. He worked with some of the biggest names in the Malayalam theater industry, and his productions were staged all over the country.

== Works ==
Thoolika wrote and directed over 70 productions for 19 theatre troupes, composing the music in some cases.

- Pramani
- Pakal Pooram
- Chemmeen
- Layavinyasam
- Ammaveedu
- Thulasithara
- Mithunamrashi
- Palliveetta
- Kilipaate
- Swathanthran
- Kathilola Ponoola
- Anubhavangale Palichakale
- Enippadikal

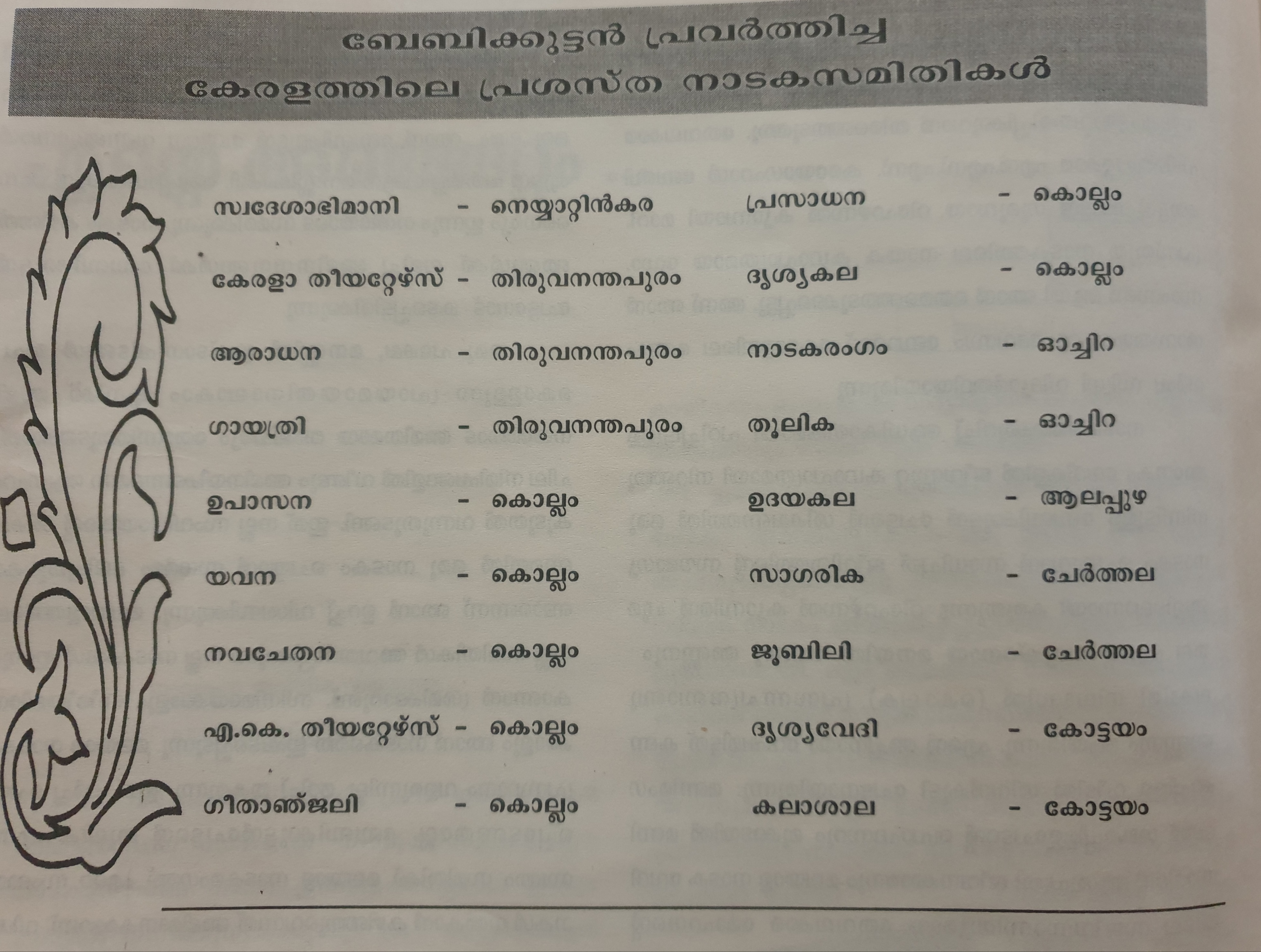
List of drama Companies Babykuttan worked with.

== Awards ==
- 2002 Kerala Sangeetha Nataka Academi Award (C. I. Parameswaran Pillai Memorial Endowment Award).
- 2021 Gandhi Bhavan Art Award.
- 1983 Kerala State Award for Professional Plays, Best Playwright-Layavinyasam.
- 2017 Priyadarshini Rangashree Award.
- DK Chellappan Memorial Award.
- Thopil Bhasi Kirti Award
- 2021 NBT Pratibha Award.
- Mutukulam Award.
- Kottarakkara Sreedharan Nair Award.
- Artist Keshavan Award.
- Geetha Salam Award.

== Family ==
Born on September 15, 1945, Babykuttan is a prominent figure born to a Nair family named Thundil, in Thevalakkara. He was born as the second son to the renowned dramatist Thevalakkara Kunjan Pillai and Kamalamma Pillai. Babykuttan has two brothers Somaraja Kurup and Radhakrishna Kurup and a sister Usha. He is married to Rema Devi Meenakshi Amma from Edakketamveetil Kaliyilil, and has three children: two sons, Rajesh G and Renjish T G, and a daughter, Sree Lekshmi. Currently residing in his house "Thoolika" in Thevalakkara, he continues to be a major influence in his field.
