= Veeram (2016 film) =

Indian historical drama film by Jayaraj

- Official English poster
- Directed by: Jayaraj
- Screenplay by: Jayaraj; Dialogues: Dr. Gokulnath Ammanathil; Mary Ryan
- Based on: Macbeth by William Shakespeare
- Produced by: Chandramohan D. Pillai; Pradeep Rajan
- Starring: Kunal Kapoor; Shivajith Padmanabhan; Ahran Choudhary; Divina Thakur; Himarsha Venkatsamy; Ketaki Narayan; Bilas Nair; Satheesh Menon
- Cinematography: S. Kumar
- Edited by: Appu N. Bhattathiri
- Music by: Jeff Rona
- Production company: Chandrakala Arts
- Release dates: 12 December 2016 (New Delhi); 24 February 2017 (India)
- Country: India
- Languages: Malayalam; Hindi; English
- Budget: ₹35 crore

Veeram (transl. Valour) is a 2016 Indian historical drama film directed and co-written by Jayaraj. It is an adaptation of William Shakespeare's Macbeth, and is the fifth installment in Jayaraj's Navarasa series. The film, which is also inspired by the Vadakkan Pattukal (lit. 'the ballads of the north') of North Malabar region in Kerala tells the story of Chandu Chekavar (Kunal Kapoor), an infamous warrior in the 13th century North Malabar.

Veeram is simultaneously made in Malayalam, Hindi, and English with the same title. Principal photography commenced on 5 January 2016 in Thiruvananthapuram, where it was mostly shot, with other locations being Agra and Aurangabad. The film premiered at the BRICS Film Festival on 2 September 2016 in New Delhi, and was released on 24 February 2017.

== Cast ==
- Kunal Kapoor as Chandu Chekaver
- Shivajith Padmanabhan as Aromal Chekaver
- Himarsha Venkatsamy as Unniyarcha
- Satheesh Menon as Raman Chekaver (Kunhiraman)
- Shiyas Kareem as Warrior (Killer)
- Ashraf Gurukkal as Kannappachekavar
- Ketaki Narayan as Kunjuneeli
- Divina Thakur as Kuttimani
- Ahran Choudhary as Aringodar Chekaver
- Bilas Nair as Komappan
- Gopan Mavelikkara as Vazhunor
- Justin Antony as Aromalunni
- Monichan as Malayan
- Atul as Paanan
- Jayadeep V. Nair as Chandappan

== Production ==
=== Development ===
After the film Ottaal, Jayaraj announced in an interview in March 2015 that he is planning to adapt William Shakespeare's Macbeth and Fyodor Dostoyevsky's The Brothers Karamazov for a feature film. Jayaraj had earlier adapted two of Shakespeare plays Othello and Antony and Cleopatra into feature films in Malayalam. Veeram, an adaptation of Macbeth was officially announced by Jayaraj in October 2015. The announcement was held during a function in Doha, organised by the executives of Chandrakala Arts, a newly formed film production company based in Qatar, who are also the investors of Veeram. Jayaraj said, the film's story is set in the 13th century Kerala and will features newcomers as actors, and most of the technical crew will be from the American film industry. Apart from Malayalam, the film is also made in English and Hindi to attract an international audience. The film was planned to start production in November 2015 for a mid-2016 release.

=== Pre-production ===
Pre-production underwent until early December 2015. Veeram is the fifth film in Jayaraj's Navarasa series, the story adapted from Macbeth will be set in North Malabar and Jayaraj also takes inspiration from Vadakkan Pattukal (Northern Ballads). The film will abundantly use the martial art, Kalarippayattu.

Jayaraj calls the film his dream project. After completing the screenplay and conceptualising a production plan, he put a newspaper advertisement in search of producers. Chandramohan D. Pilai, a Qatar-based banker and an old friend of Jayaraj, replied to the ad. In fact, almost thirty years ago, Pillai already had a discussion with Jayaraj about producing a film, and Jayaraj was interesting in directing it. The deal was finalised, after which Jayaraj invited him to India for further discussions about the film's production plans, which likely requires a high budget. Pillai formed the production company, Chandrakala Arts in India, for producing the film with collaboration from two of his friends, though they do not wanted to credit their names in the film. Jayaraj himself traveled to the United States in search of technical assistance for the film.

Jayaraj did not want to cast stars or experienced actors in the film as he does not want to compromise his directorial freedom as star actors often demand alterations in the script to glamourise their characters. Audition for actors was conducted in three rounds, with the first one conducted in Mumbai in October 2015, and second round in Chennai, and third in Kerala. Over 4500 candidates participated in the audition. Even though, later in 2018, Jayaraj revealed that he had approached Mohanlal for the lead role and had handed over the screenplay to him, who did not show interest.

Despite the search for a newcomer, Bollywood actor Kunal Kapoor was selected to portray the protagonist. He plays the role of Chandu Chekavar, an infamous warrior in the Vadakkan Pattukal (Northern Ballads) of North Malabar region in Kerala. Kapoor's name was confirmed in late December 2015. Preparing for the role, Kunal attended a Kalaripayattu training schedule in Mumbai, who was taught by a Gurukkal from Kollam in a strict schedule which started in October 2015. He also underwent weight training and increased 12 kg (26 lb) muscle weight for the role. Kapoor said, it is every actors wish to play Macbeth and he had a long time wish to do an action film, so when he was offered the role he immediately signed it. During preparation period, apart from his martial art training, he had a regular reading workshop with Jayaraj and also learned Malayalam. His character was reported to have a beard and a man-bun. Veeram is Kapoor's debut film in Malayalam cinema. Most of the other characters in the film were done by newcomers from Mumbai and Kerala.

=== Filming ===
Principal photography commenced on 5 January 2016 in Thiruvananthapuram, Kerala. The film is mostly based in the Southern region of India, the filming locations were in Thiruvananthapuram, Agra, and Aurangabad. Veeram was simultaneously made in Malayalam, Hindi and English. Kapoor's scenes were shot in such a way that they will first shoot it in Hindi, then the same scene will be re-shoot in English and finally in Malayalam, as he was most comfortable with Hindi and the least with Malayalam. The filming hours normally went up to 16 hours a day. The film was mostly shot in Thiruvananthapuram, some portions were shot in Ajanta and Ellora Caves in Aurangabad, Maharashtra and in Agra, Uttar Pradesh. The filming was completed in mid-April 2016. The film will not feature any songs, unlike other Indian films.

The film's stunt choreography was done by Allan Poppleton, Trefor Proud was make-up artist, music was composed by Jeff Rona, and film's colour grading was supervised by Jeff Olm. Poppleton researched on the martial art Kalaripayattu for the film for almost two months at various teaching centres. Along with the various Kalari movements, he incorporated his on style to adjust it to the camera angles. For the costumes and makeup, Trefor researched for several months. The costumes represent the clothes worn by 13th century warriors in North Malabar. Body paints and tattoos were also used to get a fierce look. The colours used resemble the ones used in various dance forms in Kerala, that including Kathakali. The film's soundtrack was an orchestral combination of traditional Maratha folk music. Veeram was one of the most expensive films made in Malayalam at that time, made on a budget of ₹20 crore (₹200 million).

== Music ==
Former Hans Zimmer associate Jeff Rona, who debuted as an independent film composer with Ridley Scott's White Squall has composed and produced the film score. The film marks Rona's debut in Malayalam cinema and Bollywood.

== Release ==
The film was initially planned as a mid-2016 release. Veeram was premiered as the opening film at the BRICS Film Festival on 2 September 2016 at the Siri Fort Auditorium in New Delhi, India. The film's theatrical release was on 24 February 2017. The movie was then released on Amazon Prime on January 17, 2022.

== Navarasa Series ==
Veeram is part of Jayaraj's Navarasa series. The films in the series include:

- Shantham (2000) – Shanta (peace)
- Karunam (2000) – Karuna (compassion)
- Bhibatsa (2002) – Bibhatsa (disgust)
- Adbutham (2005) – Adbhuta (wonder)
- Veeram (2016) – Veera (valour)
- Bhayanakam (2018) – Bhaya (fear)
- Roudram 2018 (2019) – Raudra (anger)
- Hasyam (2021) – Hasya (humour)

== Reception ==
Veeyen praised the film, writing, "it is no ordinary canvas that Jayaraj has mounted his epic film ‘Veeram’ on, and as such it evolves into an ambitious demonstration of an idea that amazingly blends two classic tales together. Atypical in conception and phenomenal in implementation, ‘Veeram’ presents you with one of the most memorable cinematographic experiences that you have witnessed ever in contemporary Malayalam cinema."
