= Enippadikal =

Enippadikal may refer to:

- Enippadikal (novel), a Malayalam novel by Thakazhi Sivasankara Pillai
- Enippadikal (film), a Malayalam film based on the novel
- Enippadigal, a Tamil-language film
