= Nikhil S. Praveen =

Indian cinematographer

- Born: October 3, 1991 (age 34); Mattakkara, Kottayam, Kerala, India
- Education: Cochin Media School
- Occupation: Cinematographer
- Years active: 2018 - Present
- Notable work: Bhayanakam, Rowdram 2018, Kaaval, Freedom Fight
- Awards: National Film Award for Best Cinematography, Kerala Film Critics Association Awards for Best cinematographer, Best Cinematographer at Beijing International Film Festival

Nikhil S. Praveen is an Indian cinematographer working mainly in Malayalam films. The Kottayam native made his debut with the 2017 film Bhayanakam directed by Jayaraj for which he received Best Cinematography award at the 65th National Film Awards.

== Filmography ==
- All films in Malayalam unless otherwise noted

| Year | Title | Director | Notes |
|---|---|---|---|
| 2015 | Kuttanad - A Unique Watery Landscape | Pradeep Nair | Documentary |
| 2017 | Crossroad | Pradeep Nair | Anthology film - Kodeshyan |
| 2017 | Bhayanakam | Jayaraj | Feature film |
| 2018 | Angu Doore Oru Deshathu | Joshy Mathew | Feature film |
| 2018 | Kadammanitta - Prakruthiyude Padayanikkaran | Jayaraj | Documentary |
| 2019 | Thelivu | M.A. Nishad | Feature film |
| 2019 | Roudram 2018 | Jayaraj | Feature film |
| 2021 | Kaaval | Nithin Renji Panicker | Feature film |
| 2022 | Freedom Fight - Ration | Francies Louis | Anthology film |
| 2022 | Kappu | Sanju V Samuel | Feature film - Upcoming |
| 2023 | Live | V. K. Prakash | |
| 2024 | Cup | Sanju V Samuel | |
| 2025 | Innocent | Satheesh Thanvi | |

== Awards ==
- 2018 - National Film Award for Best Cinematography - Bhayanakam
- 2018 - Kerala Film Critics Association Awards for Best cinematographer - Bhayanakam
- 2019 - Best Cinematographer at Beijing International Film Festival - Bhayanakam
