= Thakazhy railway station =

Railway station in Kerala, India

Thakazhy

General information
- Location: Thakazhy, Alappuzha, Kerala; India
- Coordinates: 9.3701°N 76.4090°E
- System: Regional rail, Light rail & Commuter rail station
- Owner: Indian Railways
- Operator: Southern Railway zone
- Line: Kayamkulam-Alappuzha-Ernakulam
- Platforms: 1
- Tracks: 2

Construction
- Structure type: At–grade
- Parking: Available

Other information
- Status: Functioning
- Station code: TKZ
- Zone(s): Southern Railway zone
- Division(s): Thiruvananthapuram
- Fare zone: Indian Railways

History
- Opened: 1989; 37 years ago
Location
- Location within Kerala Location within India

Thakazhy railway station is a railway station of the Southern Railway zone, in Alappuzha District, Kerala. The station code is TZH.

The station falls under the Thiruvananthapuram railway division of the Southern Railway zone, Indian Railways.
