= Vellapokkathil =

- Short story by Thakazhi Sivasankara Pillai
- Original title: വെള്ളപ്പൊക്കത്തിൽ
- Language: Malayalam

Publication
- Published in: Puthumalar
- Publication type: Anthology
- Publisher: Bharath Vilasom, Trivandrum
- Publication date: 1935

"Vellapokkathil" (Malayalam: വെള്ളപ്പൊക്കത്തിൽ, English: In the Flood) is a short story written by Thakazhi Sivasankara Pillai. The story was published in 1935 and is based on the author's childhood experience during the Great Flood of 1924 in Kerala. Widely considered one of Thakazhi's best stories, it follows the plight of a man named Chennan and his family, as they are trapped in their home during a severe flood. They are eventually rescued by a passing boat, but their dog is left behind and is forced to survive on its own.

== Plot ==
Set in Kuttanad against the backdrop of the Great flood of 1928, the story begins with a description of a temple submerged in water up to the neck of its deity. The floodwaters have also forced many people to seek refuge in the uppermost storey of the temple. Chennan, a pariah who does not own a boat, has built an elevated platform out of coconut twigs inside his hut to protect his pregnant wife, four children, cat, and dog from the rising waters. Chennan fears that if they leave the hut, they will not survive the flood.

After three days of heavy rainfall, Chennan spots a big boat moving north and yells for help. The men in the boat hear him and row towards the hut. Chennan helps his family into the boat. However, only when the boat was gaining speed and was far away from the hut, they realised that the dog was still on the roof. The dog becomes distressed when it realises its family has left without it and begins howling piteously.

The rest of the story follows the dog's struggles to survive alone on the roof of the hut. The floodwaters recede eventually, and Chennan comes in search of the dog. He finds the corpse of a dog under a coconut tree, but he is unsure if it was his dog.

== Publication ==
The story was included in the short story collection Puthumalar (New Flower, 1935), published by Bharath Vilasom, Trivandrum. It was Thakazhi's first published collection of short stories.

== Adaptations ==
Jayaraj adapted the story into a 25-minute long short film titled Vellapokkathil (In Deluge, 2007). The film received the National Film Award for Best Non-Feature Film Direction at the 2007 National Film Awards. An installation based on the story was displayed at the Kochi-Muziris Biennale, in 2017.

== English translations ==
- "In The Floods". In Wind Flowers: Classic Malayalam Short Stories. Translated by V. Abdulla and R. E. Asher.
- "The Flood". In A Clutch of Indian Masterpieces: Extraordinary Short Stories from the 19th Century to the Present. Translated by O. V. Usha.
- "The Flood". Translated by Santhosh Alex
