= Hasyam =

Indian Malayalam-language black comedy film

- Directed by: Jayaraj
- Written by: Jayaraj
- Cinematography: Vinod Illampally
- Edited by: Jinu Sobha
- Music by: Sreevalsan J. Menon
- Release dates: June 2020 (Shanghai Film Festival); 25 November 2022
- Country: India
- Language: Malayalam

Hasyam is a 2020 Indian Malayalam-language black comedy film written and directed by Jayaraj. It is the eighth film in his Navarasa series, based on the rasa (emotion) of hasya (humour). The film stars Harisree Ashokan and KPAC Lalitha, and explores through dark humour the themes surrounding death, bureaucracy, and the banality of life.

== Plot ==
The film follows a cadaver transporter (played by Harisree Ashokan), employed to carry unclaimed bodies from a government hospital to cremation grounds. Despite the grim nature of his job, the story injects humour into everyday bureaucratic absurdities, questioning society’s emotional detachment from death and suffering.

== Cast ==
- Harisree Ashokan as the cadaver agent
- KPAC Lalitha as a local resident
- Sabitha Jayaraj
- P. Sreekumar
- Sruthibala
- Amith Chakalakkal

== Production ==
Hasyam is the eighth entry in Jayaraj’s ambitious Navarasa series, each representing a different emotion from the Indian aesthetic tradition. Vinod Illampally handled the cinematography, while Jinu Sobha edited the film. Jayaraj stated in an interview that he makes one film every year and sends it to international festivals, with Hasyam being one such work.

== Reception ==
Hasyam received critical acclaim for its unique narrative style and black humour. Baradwaj Rangan of Film Companion described it as a "comic masterpiece that revolves around death."

Cinema Express praised the film’s pitch-black humour and social relevance.

Firstpost called it a "tragi-comic tale" that critiques society’s casual disregard for the dignity of the dead.

However, some reviews noted the film’s slow pace and minimalist structure. Filmibeat called it "a one-time watch." Manorama Online praised its technical finesse but noted that it may not appeal to mainstream audiences.

== Festival Screenings ==
The film was selected for the Shanghai International Film Festival in 2020. It was also chosen to represent Malayalam cinema in the competition section of the International Film Festival of Kerala (IFFK), alongside Churuli by Lijo Jose Pellissery.

Critic Lalit Rao of FIPRESCI described the film as "philosophical, meditative, and darkly comic."

== Navarasa Series ==
Hasyam is part of Jayaraj's Navarasa series. The films in the series include:

- Shantham (2000) – Shanta (peace)
- Karunam (2000) – Karuna (compassion)
- Bhibatsa (2002) – Bibhatsa (disgust)
- Adbutham (2005) – Adbhuta (wonder)
- Veeram (2016) – Veera (valour)
- Bhayanakam (2018) – Bhaya (fear)
- Roudram 2018 (2019) – Raudra (anger)
- Hasyam (2021) – Hasya (humour)
