= Kaaval =

Kaaval (transl. Protection) may refer to these Indian films:

- Kaaval (1985 film), a Tamil-language film
- Kaaval (2015 film), a Tamil-language film
- Kaaval (2021 film), a Malayalam-language film
