= Thakazhy Sree Dharma Sastha Temple =

Hindu temple in Alappuzha district, Kerala

- Sree Dharma Sastha Temple, Thakazhi, Alappuzha, Kerala

Religion
- Affiliation: Hinduism
- District: Alappuzha
- Deity: Dharma Sastha
- Festivals: Kumbham annual festival, Kalamezhuthupattu, Kalabhabhishekam

Location
- Location: Thakazhi
- State: Kerala
- Country: India
- Interactive map of Thakazhy Sree Dharma Sastha Temple
- Coordinates: 9°22′19.8″N 76°24′35.2″E

Architecture
- Type: Architecture of Kerala

Specifications
- Temple: One
- Elevation: 24.11 m (79 ft)

Thakazhy Sree Dharma Sastha Temple is six kilometers from Ambalapuzha at Thakazhy in Alappuzha district, Kerala in India. The presiding deity is Shasthavu (Lord Ayyappan) who faces east. There are no sub-deities in this temple.

== Formation ==
The idol in this temple was once installed on a hill named Othera by Lord Parasurama. But the idol drifted to a farm because of a heavy flood. A magician (Odiyan) in that place found the idol and gave it to 'Vilwamangalam Swami' for installation. Vilwamangalam recognized its supernatural and gave it to a sage named Udhayarkkan. That sage installed the idol and the King of Chembakassery built a temple for it. Five poojas are offered following the Manayathattu thantric rites.

== Festivals ==
The main festival is in the month Kumbham. It is an eight-day festival which ends with Arattu. Kalamezhuthupattu is celebrated for 41 days. Kalabhabhishekam is celebrated from 1st Dhanu and ends after 11 days.

== Valiyenna (Medicinal Oil) ==
Valiyenna (a special type of medicinal oil) is a speciality of this temple. This oil has magical powers to cure the diseases of manhood. These medicines are collected from Othar hill.
