= Thevalakkara =

Village in Kerala, India

Thevalakkara Deva Loka Kara ( Area of GODS)
- Village
- Location in Kerala, India Thevalakkara (India)
- Coordinates: 09°01′00″N 76°35′00″E
- Country: India
- State: Kerala
- District: Kollam
- Taluk: Karunagappally

Government
  - Type: Gram Panchayat

Area
  - Total: 16.92 km^{2} (6.53 sq mi)
- Elevation: 10 m (33 ft)

Population (2011)
  - Total: 42,977
  - Density: 2,540/km^{2} (6,579/sq mi)

Languages
  - Official: Malayalam, English
- Time zone: UTC+5:30 (IST)
- PIN: 690524
- STD code: 0476287
- Vehicle registration: KL-23
- Nearest city: Karunagappally
- Lok Sabha constituency: Kollam
- Vidhan Sabha constituency: Chavara

Thevalakkara is a village in the Karunagappally Taluk, Kollam District of the state of Kerala, India. It is located near the coast of the Arabian Sea, about 13 kilometres north of the district capital Kollam, and 7 kilometres southeast of the subdistrict capital Karunagappally. It contains a Devi temple along with a church and a mosque. The kadappa at Thevalakara is where ship masts (kadappa) were made for centuries. In 2011, it has a total population of 42,977. The name thevalakkara came from Devalokakkara which means the land of gods because the place had many worship places of different religions.

Example

-Martha Mariam Orthodox Syrian Church

-Thevalakkara Chaliyath Muslim Jamath

-Major Devi Temple

== Geography ==
Thevalakkara is located on the northwestern shore of the Ashtamudi Lake. The National Highway 183A passes through the village. Its average elevation is 10 metres above the sea level.

=== Climate ===
Thevalakkara has a tropical monsoon climate (Köppen Am). Its wettest month is June, with an average rainfall of 418 millimetres or 16.5 inches; and the driest month is January, with an average rainfall of 25 millimetres or 1 inch.

Governance, infrastructure, and services

- Thevalakkara is governed by its Gram Panchayat, which is the basic local government unit in Indian villages. As part of this system, the Panchayat handles local-level planning, roads, sanitation, public schools, etc.
- There are 14 schools in the panchayat.It consists of several wards — the local administrative subdivisions for electoral and management purposes. (Previously noted as 23 wards)
- There are multiple levels of schools in the village: Govt & private primary, middle, and secondary schools.

Climate data for Thevalakkara
Month	Jan	Feb	Mar	Apr	May	Jun	Jul	Aug	Sep	Oct	Nov	Dec	Year
Mean daily maximum °C (°F)	30.9 (87.6)	32 (90)	32.2 (90.0)	31.2 (88.2)	29.9 (85.8)	28.2 (82.8)	27.8 (82.0)	27.8 (82.0)	28.3 (82.9)	28.6 (83.5)	28.9 (84.0)	29.7 (85.5)	29.6 (85.4)
Daily mean °C (°F)	26.5 (79.7)	27.3 (81.1)	28 (82)	27.9 (82.2)	27.3 (81.1)	26 (79)	25.5 (77.9)	25.5 (77.9)	25.8 (78.4)	25.9 (78.6)	26 (79)	26.2 (79.2)	26.5 (79.7)
Mean daily minimum °C (°F)	22.9 (73.2)	23.5 (74.3)	24.7 (76.5)	25.4 (77.7)	25.4 (77.7)	24.6 (76.3)	24.1 (75.4)	24 (75)	24.1 (75.4)	24 (75)	23.7 (74.7)	23.3 (73.9)	24.1 (75.4)
Average rainfall mm (inches)	25 (1.0)	30 (1.2)	75 (3.0)	167 (6.6)	314 (12.4)	418 (16.5)	363 (14.3)	294 (11.6)	247 (9.7)	267 (10.5)	189 (7.4)	65 (2.6)	2,454 (96.8)
Source: Climate-Data.org

== Demographics ==
According to the 2011 Indian Census, Thevalakara has a total of 10,473 households. Out of the 42,977 residents, 20,278 are male and 22,699 are female. The total literacy rate is 82.52%, with 16,960 of the male population and 18,506 of the female population being literate. The census location code of the village is 628361.

== Notable personalities ==
- Thevalakkara Aliyarukunju Moulavi
- Babykuttan Thoolika
