= Jeff Rona =

- Born: Jeffrey Carl Rona; March 3, 1957 (age 69)
- Origin: Culver City, California, U.S.
- Genres: Film Scores, video game music
- Occupations: Composer, Music Producer
- Instruments: Woodwinds, Synthesizer
- Label: Wide Blue Sky
- Website: www.jeffrona.com

Jeffrey Carl Rona (born March 3, 1957) is an American composer for film. He was a member of Hans Zimmer's MediaVentures. His credits include Sharkwater, Traffic, God of War III, Phantom and Veeram. Jeff Rona was the founder and past president of MMA, the MIDI Manufacturers Association.

== Early life and education ==
Jeff Rona was born Culver City, California, the son of European immigrants.

He studied music, art and photography, but he left school to pursue music as his life's work.

== Career ==
Rona is a contemporary film composer, recording artist, and performer. He has worked around the world, using both traditional musicians and modern technologies. He began composing for dance, theater, galleries and contemporary concert venues. Eventually he became an in-demand studio musician, arranger, ethnic woodwind player, sound designer, synthesist and music programmer in Los Angeles and New York City.

He worked on films and records before landing his first solo composing project, scoring the TV drama series Homicide: Life On The Street for director Barry Levinson. Since then he has scored a number of other films and television projects with directors such as Ridley Scott, Steven Spielberg, Wong Kar-wai, Robert Altman, Steven Soderbergh, Mark Pellington, Stephen Hopkins, Jonathan Demme, Frank Darabont and many others. He was commissioned to compose a concert for the 2008 Beijing Olympics which toured China.

Among his album projects, Rona recorded and performed as a member of Jon Hassell’s group, during which he co-composed and produced City-Works Of Fiction, a record for Opal Records (now on Rykodisc). The group toured and performed with producer/composer Brian Eno. Rona has performed with the Eastern fusion ensemble Axiom of Choice and appears on their Narada records. His music is on the Transplanet series on Triloka Records, the electronica compilation "Leaves From The Tree", and "Elysium For the Brave" (by Persian singer Azam Ali).

Rona has been chronicling his experiences in the film music world over the past several years in his column The Reel World in Keyboard Magazine. The column is also the basis of his book on film music.

== Awards and honors ==
Rona's projects have received an Oscar, Peabody and Emmy awards, as well as film festival awards around the world. He is a two-time recipient of the ASCAP film and television music award.

== Film and game scores ==
- Lipstick Camera (1994)
- Death in Small Doses (TV movie) (1995)
- White Squall (1996)
- Schizopolis (uncredited) (1996)
- Do Me a Favor (1997)
- Black Cat Run (TV movie) (1998)
- NetForce (TV movie) (1999)
- Mind Prey (TV movie) (1999)
- The In Crowd (2000)
- Exit Wounds (2001)
- The Follow (Short) (2001)
- Hope (Short) (2002)
- Shelter Island (2003)
- Little Black Boot (Short) (2004)
- The Riverman (TV movie) (2004)
- Category 6: Day of Destruction (TV movie) (2004)
- Earthsea (TV mini-series) (2004)
- A Thousand Roads (Short) (2005)
- Urban Legends: Bloody Mary (Video) (2005)
- The Quiet (2005)
- Slow Burn (2005)
- For the Love of a Child (TV movie) (2006)
- Final Days of Planet Earth (TV movie) (2006)
- The Deep and Dreamless Sleep (2006)
- Sharkwater (Documentary) (2006)
- Whisper (2007)
- Jonna's Body, Please Hold (2007)
- Crash and Burn (TV movie) (2008)
- From Inside (2008)
- The Closet (Short) (2008)
- David Whyte: Live in San Francisco (Video documentary) (2009)
- American Renegade: Confessions of a Radical Humanist (Documentary) (2009)
- God of War III (Video game) (2010)
- The Tortured (2010)
- The Chosen One (2010)
- Fragged (TV movie) (2010)
- Eden (Short) (2012)
- Phantom (2013)
- Generation Iron (Documentary) (2013)
- Goliath (Short) (2014)
- Oceanus: Act One (Short film) (2015)
- Veeram (2016)
- Devil May Cry 5 (2019)

== Television series scores and music ==
- Homicide: Life on the Street (TV series) (1993–94; 13 episodes)
- The Critic (TV series) (1994; 1 episode)
- Chicago Hope (TV series) (1994–97; 70 episodes)
- High Incident (TV series) (1996; 2 episodes)
- Profiler (TV Series) (1996–97; 21 episodes)
- Gun (TV Series) (1997; 3 episodes)
- Sleepwalkers (TV series) (1997)
- Teen Angel (TV series) (1997–98; 3 episodes)
- Stephen King's Dead Zone (TV Series) (2005; 1 episode)
- Traffic (TV mini-series) (2004)
- Brotherhood (TV series) (2006)
- Hot Properties (TV series) (2005; 5 episodes)
- Fear Itself (TV series) (2008–09; 2 episodes)
- Persons Unknown (TV series) (2010; 13 episodes)
- The Ropes (TV series) (2011)
- Dominion (TV series) (2014; 7 episodes)
