= Kayar =

1978 novel by Thakazhi Sivasankara Pillai

Kayar (Coir)
- 1984 edition
- Author: Thakazhi Sivasankara Pillai
- Translator: N. Sreekantan Nair
- Language: Malayalam
- Genre: Novel
- Publisher: DC Books (Malayalam), Sahitya Akademi (English)
- Publication date: 1978
- Publication place: India
- English publication date: 1998
- Pages: 986
- Awards: Vayalar Award
- ISBN: 9788171300716

Kayar (transl. Coir) is a 1978 Malayalam epic novel by Thakazhi Sivasankara Pillai. Widely considered one of the most seminal works in Malayalam literature, Kayar received many major literary awards, including the Vayalar Award.

== Plot summary ==
Set in Kuttanad, the novel traces the evolution of the central Travancore society from the early 19th century to the mid-twentieth century. It covers more than two centuries of Kerala life, encompassing six generations of characters. The historic transformation of man's relationship with land, with other men, with women and even God, forms the staple theme of Kayar.

== Background ==
The idea of a novel that contains the vignettes of social life in Kerala stayed in the author's mind for many years. "Two hundred and fifty years of Kerala life flowed past my mind's eye. But I needed a form. I could find no help from the Western classics," Thakazhi reminisces. For years he carried the "germ" inside his head. One night, as he lay sleepless in bed, the Mahabharata epic with its episodic structure drifted into his mind as a possibility. The next day he started work on Kayar. It took him three years to complete the book.

== Translations ==
- Coir: English translation by N. Sreekantan Nair; Sahitya Akademi; 1998
- Kayiru: Tamil translation by C.A. Balan; Sahitya Akademi; 2003
- Hagga: Kannada translation by K.K. Nair and Ashok Kumar; Sahitya Akademi; 2007
- Rassi (1995), Hindi translation by Sudhanshu Chaturvedi. For this, Chaturvedi has won the Sahitya Akademi Award for translation.

== Adaptations ==
- Bhayanakam (2018), directed by Jayaraj.

== Awards ==
- 1980: Vayalar Award
