= Chemmeen (novel) =

1956 novel by Thakazhi Sivasankara Pillai

- First English edition cover
- Author: Thakazhi Sivasankara Pillai
- Original title: ചെമ്മീൻ
- Language: Malayalam
- Genre: Romance, Drama
- Publisher: National Book Stall, D. C. Books
- Publication date: 1956
- Publication place: India
- English publication date: 1962
- Pages: 207
- ISBN: 9788171305506
- Preceded by: Randidangazhi
- Followed by: Enippadikal

Chemmeen (Malayalam: ചെമ്മീൻ, cemmīn [t͡ʃemmiːn], lit. prawn) is a Malayalam novel written by Thakazhi Sivasankara Pillai in 1956. Chemmeen tells the story of the relationship between Karuthamma, the daughter of a Hindu fisherman, and Pareekutti, the son of a Muslim fish wholesaler.

The theme of the novel is a myth among the fishermen communities along the coastal Kerala State in the Southern India. The myth is about chastity. If a married fisherwoman was adulterous when her husband was at sea, the Sea Goddess (Kadalamma literally meaning Mother Sea) would consume him. It is to perpetuate this myth that Thakazhi wrote this novel. It was adapted into a film of same name, which won critical acclaim and commercial success.

Thakazhi made a departure from his a vowed commitment to realism as it appeared in his works till then he brought in a fresh breeze of lyricism and romanticism. The novel acquires the quality of a fable in which life in the fishermen's community is depicted with great emotional detail. The customs, taboos, beliefs, rituals and the day-to-day business of living through the pain of stark existence come alive magically through Thakazhi's pen.

Chemmeen won the Kendra Sahitya Akademi Award, India's second highest literary prize, in 1957, becoming the first Malayalam novel to receive the national honor. Chemmeen was translated to more than 30 languages which include major Indian languages and foreign languages. The novel was accepted as part of the UNESCO collection of Representative Works - Indian series.

== Plot ==
Chembankunju's only aim in life is to own a boat and a net. He finally succeeds in buying both with the help of Pareekutty, a young Muslim trader, on condition that the fish hauled by the boat will be sold to him. Chembankunju's pretty daughter Karuthamma and Pareekutty love each other. Karuthamma's mother, Chakki, knows about it and reminds her daughter about the life they lead within the boundaries of strict social tradition. Karuthamma sacrifices her love for Pareekutty and marries Palani, an orphan discovered by Chembankunju in the course of one of his fishing expeditions. Following the marriage, Karuthamma accompanies her husband to his village, despite her mother's sudden illness and her father's repeated requests to stay. In his fury, Chembankunju disowns her. On acquiring a boat and a net and subsequently adding one more, Chembankunju becomes more greedy and heartless. With his dishonesty, he drives Pareekutty to bankruptcy. After the death of his wife, Chembankunju marries Pappikunju, the widow of the man from whom he had bought his first boat. Panchami, Chembankunju's younger daughter, leaves home to join Karuthama, on arrival of her stepmother. Meanwhile, Karuthamma has endeavoured to be a good wife and mother. But scandal about her old love for Pareekutty spreads in the village. Palani's friends ostracize him and refuse to take him fishing with them. By a stroke of fate, Karuthamma and Pareekutty meet one night and their old love is revived. Palani, at sea, alone and baiting a large shark, is caught in a huge whirlpool and is swallowed by the sea. The next morning, Karuthamma and Pareekutty, are also found dead hand in hand, washed ashore. At a distance lies the washed-up corpse of Palani's baited shark.

== Characters ==
- Chembankunju - A Dishonest Fisherman
- Chakki - Spouse of Chembankunju
- Pareekutty - Muslim Trader who falls in love with Karuthamma
- Karuthamma - Daughter of Chembankunju
- Palani - Fisherman who marries Karuthamma
- Panchami - Chembankunju's younger daughter

== Reception ==
The novel was an immediate success although the critical reaction was mixed. Some critics wrote that the novel is the best social novel written in Malayalam since O. Chandhu Menon's Sarada. Some thought that the central cord of superstition is a myth. Some critics wrote that the novel shows Thakazhi's decline as a progressive writer, as the story of Chemmeen is essentially romantic and does not bring in class struggle like Thakazhi's earlier novels Thottiyude Makan or Randidangazhi.

== Inspiration and influences ==
Chemmeen is Pillai's best novel which expresses the aspirations, struggle and grief in the lives of the fishermen of Kerala. Chemmeen has so much to offer to the readers. This critical study will help students of advanced degree courses of various universities as well as general readers to understand various aspects related to this novel. The tragedy of the poor fisherman has been depicted on the epical scale. Thakazhi Sivasankara Pillai's (Malayalam) novel Chemmeen, accepted as part of the UNESCO Collection of Representative Works - Indian Series, was translated by V.K.Narayana Menon, and published by Victor Gollancz, London in 1962. It was the first significant Malayalam novel to be translated into English after Independence or, rather, during the early post-colonial era.

== Translations ==
Widely successful, Chemmeen was translated into English, Hindi, Russian, German, Italian, Arabic and French along with several Indian languages. Three years after the original publication, a translated Hindi version, titled मछुवारे/Machhuware (lit. fisherfolks) was published. The translation was done by Bharati Vidyarthi.

Chemmeen has been translated into English many times. Narayana Menon's translation titled Anger of the Sea-Goddess remains very popular even to this day. Another English translation is by Anita Nair, titled Chemmeen as in Malayalam. It has gone into several editions and is readily available at bookshops all over India.

The novel was translated into Gujarati by Kamal Jasapara, published in 1980. Chemmeen has been translated into Arabic as well by Muhiyudheen Aluway titled as Shemmeen.

== Film adaptation ==
It was adapted into a film in 1965, which won critical acclaim and commercial success. The film, titled Chemmeen itself, was directed by Ramu Kariat. Sheela, Madhu, Kottarakkara Sreedharan Nair and Sathyan played the lead characters in the film. It won the Indian President's Gold Medal for the Best Film of 1965.

The screenplay was written by S. L. Puram Sadanandan, with cinematography by Marcus Bartley, and editing by Hrishikesh Mukherjee and K.D. George. Songs were set to music by Salil Chowdhury, with lyrics by Vayalar, and featuring voices of Manna Dey, K. J. Yesudas and P. Leela.
