= Vellapokkathil (film) =

- Directed by: Jayaraj
- Screenplay by: P. Ananthapadmanabhan
- Based on: Vellapokkathil by Thakazhi Sivasankara Pillai
- Produced by: Doordarshan; Jayaraj
- Starring: Thankappan; Bindu
- Cinematography: M. J. Radhakrishnan
- Music by: Trichur Ananthapadmanabhan
- Production company: Guru Vision
- Release date: 2007
- Running time: 25 minutes
- Country: India
- Language: Malayalam

Vellapokkathil (English: In Deluge) is a 2007 Malayalam-language short film directed by Jayaraj based on the short story of the same name by Thakazhi Sivasankara Pillai. The film is set in Kuttanad against the backdrop of the Great flood of 1924. The story follows the plight of Chennan and his family, who are rescued from their submerged home by a passing boat during the severe flood, leaving their dog behind to survive the harsh flood conditions. The film won the National Film Award for Best Non-Feature Film Direction at the 2007 National Film Awards.
