= Randidangazhi =

1948 Malayalam novel by Thakazhi Sivasankara Pillai

Randidangazhi (English: Two Measures, Malayalam: രണ്ടിടങ്ങഴി) is a Malayalam novel written by Thakazhi Sivasankara Pillai in 1948. The novel tells the story of the cruelty meted out by feudal landlords to impoverished farm labourers. A film adaptation with the same name was released in 1958.

The novel was translated into Hindi by Bharati Vidyarthi as Do Ser Dhan (Sahitya Akademi, 1957). The novel was translated into Gujarati by Kamal Jasapara as Be Sher Dangar (Sahitya Akademi, 1978). It was also translated into Telugu in 1980 and published by the Hyderabad Book Trust as Coolie Ginjalu.
