= Thakazhy =

- Village
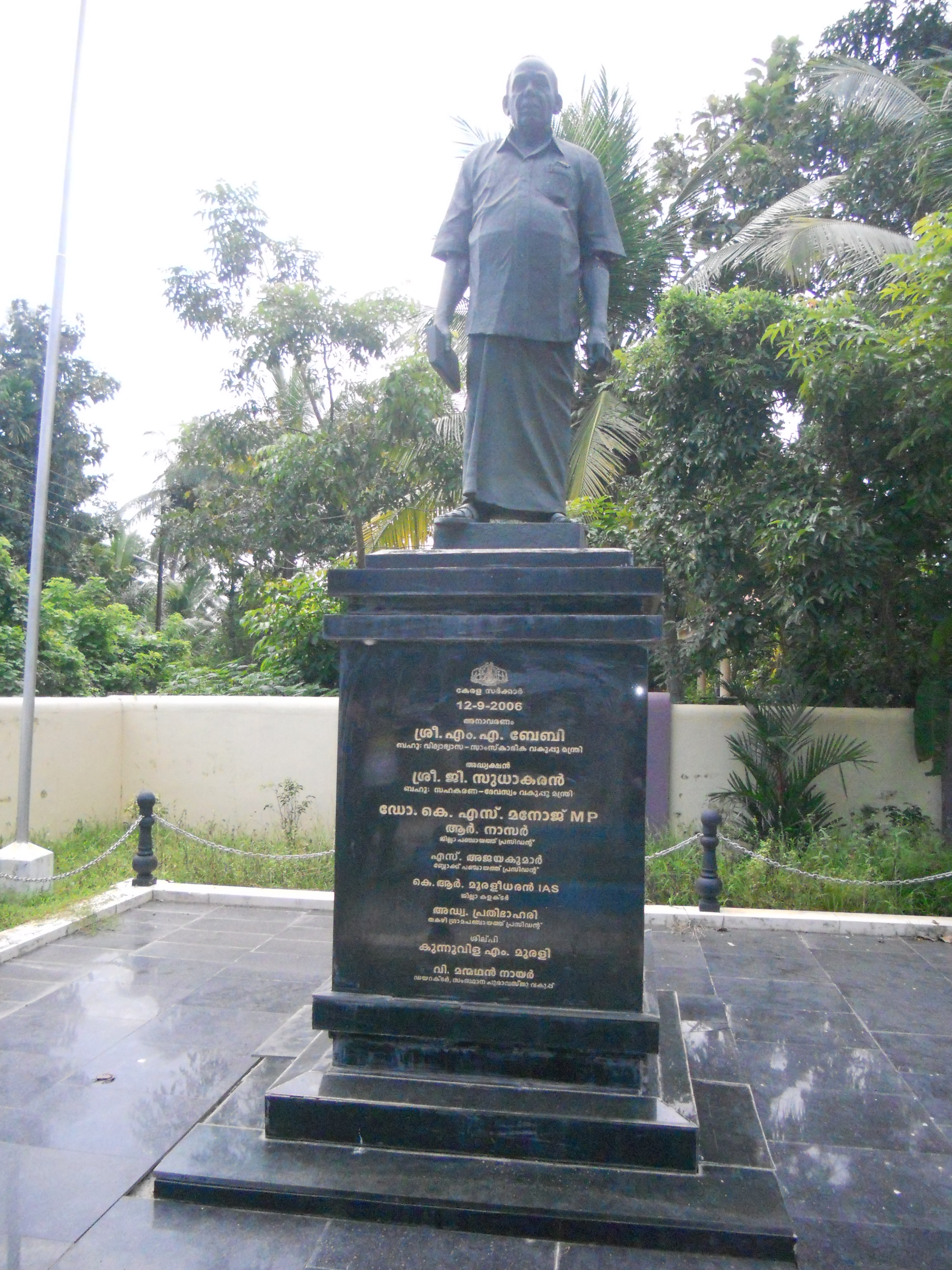

- Thakazhi, Alappuzha, Kerala, India
- Coordinates: 9°22′14.5″N 76°24′41.4″E
- Country: India
- State: Kerala
- District: Alappuzha

Area
  - Total: 27.8 km^{2} (10.7 sq mi)
- Elevation: 25.89 m (84.9 ft)

Population (2011)
  - Total: 15,758
  - Density: 567/km^{2} (1,470/sq mi)

Languages
  - Official: Malayalam, English
- Time zone: UTC+5:30 (IST)
- Nearest city: Alappuzha

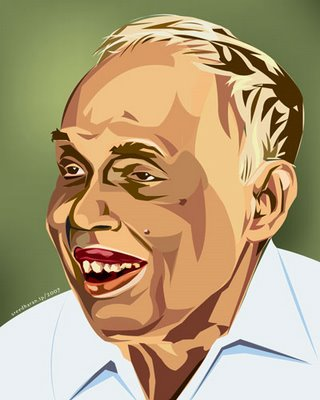
Novelist Thakazhi

Thakazhy is a village in the Alappuzha district in the Indian state of Kerala. It is part of the Kuttanad region which is bound by the backwaters and located on the banks of the River Pamba. It is the birthplace of the famous writer Thakazhi Sivasankara Pillai, who was popularly known just by his village name. There is a small temple called Ennavalyachan on the back side of the famous Dharma Sastha temple which is the second famous (belief-based) Ayyappa temple after Sabarimala.

== History ==
Thakazhy was a centre of Buddhism during the early days. It was under the Chempakassery Kingdom, which is annexed to Travancore by Marthanda Varma.

== Demographics ==
As of 2011 India census, Thakazhy had a population of 15758 with 7469 males and 8289 females.

== Thakazhi Sivasankara Pillai ==
Thakazhi Sivasankara Pillai was a renowned novelist of the Malayalam language (1912–1999). He wrote mostly on themes connected with the labour classes of Kerala. His most famous book is "Coir"(കയർ) published in 1978 . He was awarded Padma Bhushan and Jnanapith awards. His another novel "Chemmeen"(ചെമ്മീൻ) was made into an award-winning film. The life of the novelist itself was made into a renowned film called Thakazhi (film).

== Thakazhy Sree Dharma Sastha Temple ==
Thakazhy Sree Dharma Sastha Temple is situated six kilometers away from Ambalapuzha at Thakazhi in Allappuzha district. The presiding deity is Shasthavu who is facing east. 'Valiyenna'(a special type of medicinal oil) is a speciality of this temple. It is believed that this oil has magical powers in taking away all the diseases from manhood. But there are some rules and regulations for feeding the medicine.

== Economy ==
Thakazhy is an agricultural village entirely. It is part of the rice paddy fields of Kuttanad where rice is grown in low-lying fields by pumping water out. Coconut, plantain etc. are also grown in the region. There are no industries, other than the cottage industries making bamboo articles, bricks, etc.
