= Karumkulam =

- village
- Location in Kerala, India Karumkulam (India)
- Coordinates: 8.3568°N 77.0508°E
- Country: India
- State: Kerala
- District: Thiruvananthapuram
- Talukas: Neyyattinkara

Government
  - Body: Gram panchayat

Population (2011)
  - Total: 27,481

Languages
  - Official: Malayalam, English
- Time zone: UTC+5:30 (IST)
- PIN: 695526
- Vehicle registration: KL-20

Karumkulam is a village in Thiruvananthapuram district in the state of Kerala, India.

== Demographics ==
As of 2011 India census, Karumkulam had a population of 27,481, with 13,506 males and 13,975 females.

== Education ==
- Lakshmi School
- Convent School

== Access ==
Karumkulam is 21 km from Thiruvananthapuram and 7 km from Athiyannoor.

== Post office ==
Karumkulam village has a post office and the postal code is 695526.

== Stray dog menace ==
In 2016, the village filled local newspapers because a woman got killed by the attack of stray dogs. A large number of dogs wander the streets of Pulluvila to eat chicken waste dumped by hotels. Many children were attacked in the past also. Kochouseph Chittilappilly is the chairman of the Stray Dog Free movement, which advocates action against the risks allegedly posed by stray dogs in Kerala, including the amendment of legislation forbidding the killing of these dogs. The movement has pointed to the danger of rabies and referred to stray dogs as a "menace". Chittilappilly has staged hunger strikes to protest this legislation, and what he claims is governmental failure to address this issue. He has stated that the government's actions amount to valuing stray dogs over human lives and property. He has encouraged citizens to pressure the government to amend these laws, and to kill stray dogs themselves despite the accompanying 50-rupee fine. Chittilappilly has been arrested under statutes preventing cruelty to animals after tying four stray dogs in front of a police station.

The movement is related to governmental plans to cull stray dogs which have prompted an international campaign to "Boycott Kerala Tourism". Opponents of the Stray Dog Free movement have argued that vaccination and spay/neuter campaigns are a more effective and humane method of controlling the stray dog population. Members of the Stray Dog Free movement have alleged that opposition is being funded by rabies vaccine manufacturers.
