= Gandhibhavan International Trust =

Indian welfare organization

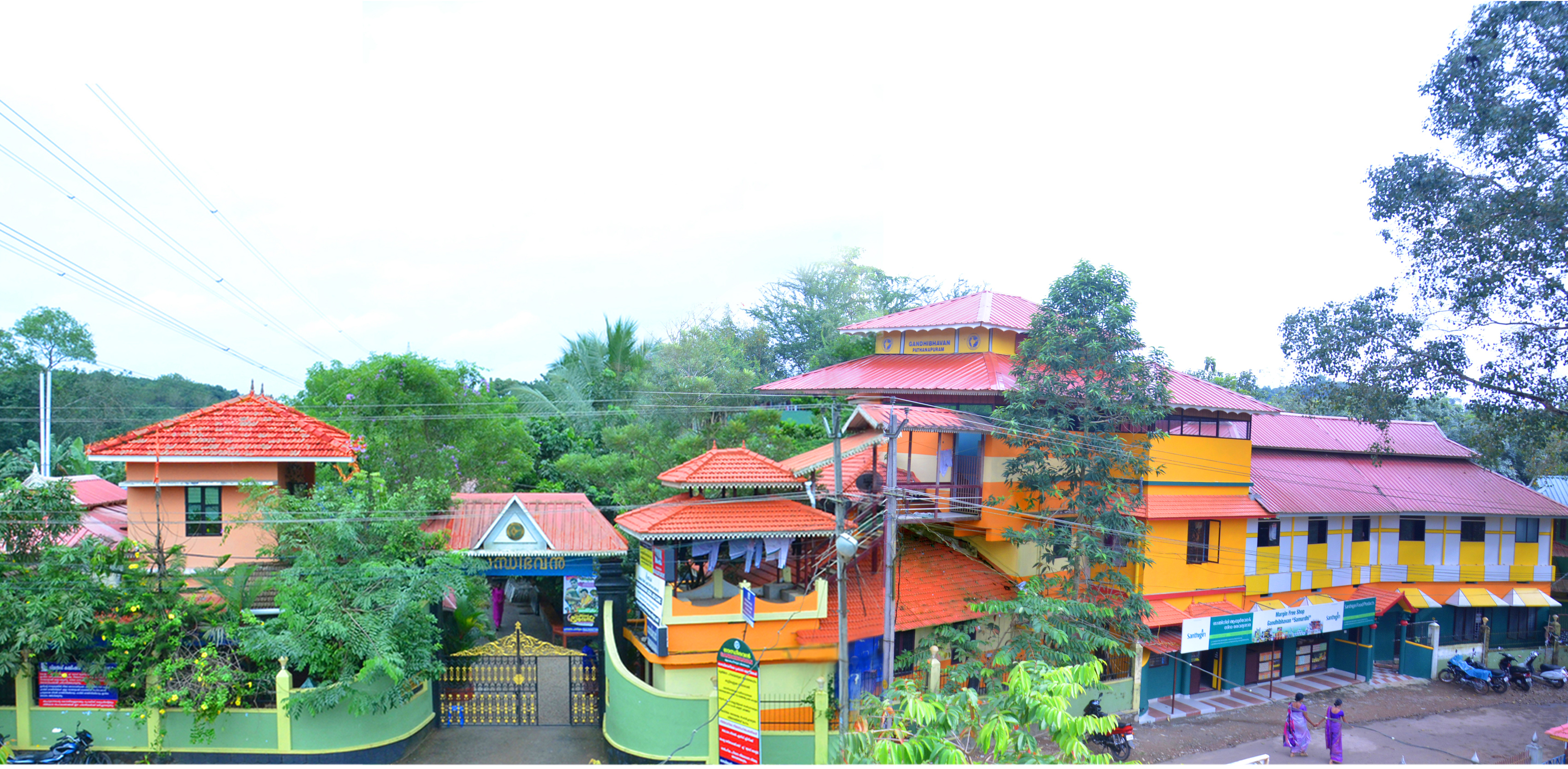
Gandhibhavan front view

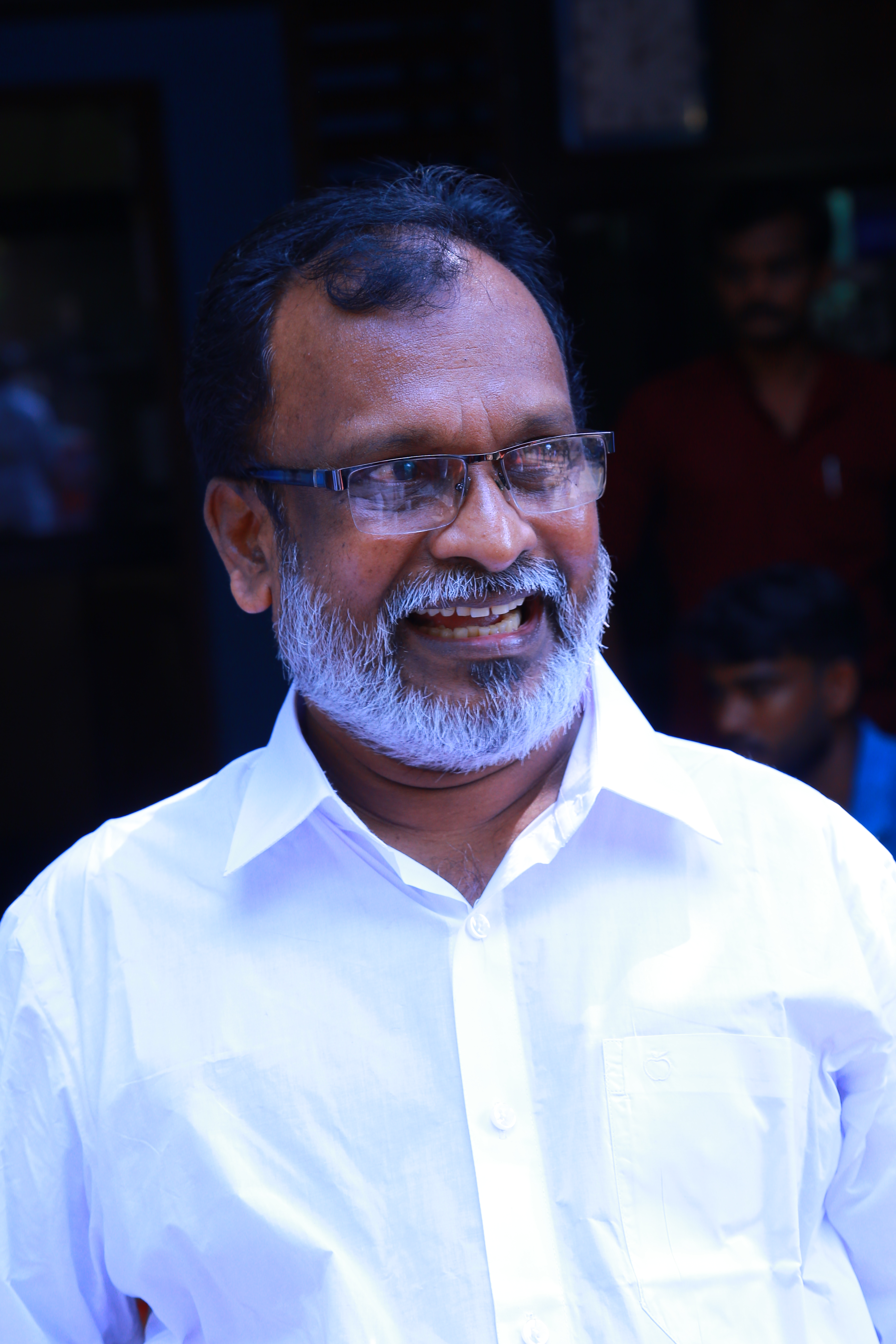
Punalur Somarajan

Gandhibhavan International Trust is an Indian non-governmental organization based in Kerala with headquarters at Pathanapuram, Kollam district. The organization, established in 2002, is dedicated to the care and welfare of destitute persons. In November 2023, around 1300 persons were receiving the care and attention of the Trust. The Trust was instituted by Punalur Somarajan, a philanthropist, who was awarded the Kerala Sree award in 2023 by the Kerala government for his social service.

The Trust runs a host of facilities including Daycare Centre for infants, toddlers and kids, Children's Home for destitute children, Special School for children with cerebral palsy, autism and other types of mental and physical disabilities, Gurukarunya Mandiram as a shelter for women and kids, Old Age Home for men, Jeevakarunya Mandiram for bedridden senior citizens, a full-fledged de-addiction centre and Palliative Care Home for women.

== Awards ==
The Trust was bestowed the Vayoshreshtha Samman in 2019 by Government of India for being the Best Institution for providing services to Senior Citizens and Awareness Generation.
