= Kaaval (2021 film) =

2021 Indian Malayalam-language action thriller film

- Theatrical release poster
- Directed by: Nithin Renji Panicker
- Written by: Nithin Renji Panicker
- Produced by: Joby George Thadathil
- Starring: Suresh Gopi; Renji Panicker
- Cinematography: Nikhil S. Praveen
- Edited by: Mansoor Muthutty
- Music by: Ranjin Raj
- Production company: Goodwill Entertainments
- Distributed by: Goodwill Entertainments
- Release date: 4 November 2021 (India)
- Running time: 148 minutes
- Country: India
- Language: Malayalam

Kaaval (transl. Guard) is a 2021 Indian Malayalam-language action drama film written & directed by Nithin Renji Panicker and produced by Joby George Thadathil under his banner Goodwill Entertainments. The film stars Suresh Gopi and Renji Panicker in the lead roles. Ranjin Raj composed the music, while Nikhil S. Praveen and Mansoor Muthutty handled the cinematography and editing respectively.

Kaaval was released on 4 November 2021, coinciding with Diwali, to mixed-to-positive reviews from critics and became a box office success.

== Plot ==
Thambaan and Anthony Joseph are a crime fighting duo in Kattappana. They are also good friends and jointly run a sawmill as a side business. Anthony and his wife Mary have two children - Rachel and Alex. The police have tried arresting them once but both have evaded capture. SI Muralidharan and Constable K.P. Varghese decides to arrest Thambaan and Anthony, but this time also they evade capture. Mary does not approve of them fighting crime and wants to leave the town. Vaalara Maani forcefully have sex with a girl named Padmini and makes her pregnant due to which Thambaan and Anthony arrive at his house and thrashes him. While Thambaan and Anthony are at Maani's house, Vargheese comes to Anthony's house. He slaps Mary and threatens to kill their children.

After hearing this, Thambaan and Anthony come to the police station, thrashes the policemen and beats up Vargheese. They hang Vargheese up onto a wall and Thambaan tells him that his habit of molesting and threatening women have ended, where the townspeople laughs and hollers at him. Embarrassed, Vargheese commits suicide. Maani and his men attack Thambaan and Anthony at night after he and the police start a partnership to beat up both of them. Anthony gets his leg broken whereas Thambaan gets his eye cut. When Thambaan comes to the hospital to visit Anthony, Mary tells Thambaan to leave and never to see Anthony again. Guilt ridden, Thambaan walks out of the hospital. Maani is put in a jail as protection but Thambaan sneaks into the police station and kills Maani.

The Head constable Arivandakshan sees Thambaan but him, being a righteous cop, ignores him as he realizes that what Thambaan did is right. Thambaan leaves the village and starts a new life in a different village. Many years later, Anthony is disabled and in financial trouble while Mary is dead. Rachel is engaged to James and Alex is in college. Anthony owes money to Kuzhiyil George, but he is unable to pay. George tells Anthony to marry Rachel to him and the debts will be taken care of. But, Anthony refuses. On Rachel's marriage day, a bunch of George's goons arrive and badly beat James. When Anthony comes to the police station to file a complaint, the new SI, Madhu K. refuses to help him as Muralidharan, who is now a DYSP, trained Madhu to be a police officer.

Having no other way, Anthony decides to go to Thambaan for help. The next day, the police inform Rachel and Alex that Anthony was involved in a car accident which killed him. George comes to their house and harasses Rachel. Rachel tries to commit suicide but is stopped by Alex. Alex decided to go to Thambaan for help. He goes to Thambaan's house and explains the situation to him. Thambaan asks him to bring Rachel and live in his house as he can't go back to the village, but Alex refuses and goes back to his house. Thambaan changes his mind and comes to the village to protect Rachel and Alex from George's men. Thambaan once again asks Rachel and Alex to come with him to his house but they refuse. Thambaan and Alex go to George and asks him for more time to repay the money where George blackmails them by telling that he has a video of Rachel bathing on his phone and if Rachel does not marry him, he will release the video online.

Thambaan is enraged and pounds him, where he takes the house's deed from George while also deleting the video from his phone. Rachel who was previously on odds with Thambaan warms up to him. Thambaan and Rachel go to a market together where Madhu, who is also at the market, starts a fight with Thambaan and subdues him. He arrest's a weakened Thambaan and releases him a day later. Rachel wakes up to see a weak Thambaan bleeding. She takes him to the hospital. Thambaan is released a few days later and he manages to convince James's parents to put the wedding back on. Thambaan finds out from Arivandakshan that on the day of the accident, Anthony was thrown out of his jeep by Madhu, so he boards a taxi. The taxi driver's name is Thomas.

Rachel and Alex finally sees Thambaan as a father figure. Rachel gets hit by a car and is in critical condition. Thambaan realizes that George's men from whom he saved Rachel and Alex were the ones who hit Rachel. Thambaan coerces George into telling the truth and goes to their hideout. There, Thambaan clobbers the henchmen. When Madhu comes there with the police to stop Thambaan and save the goons, Thambaan goes to Fr. David's house and hides there. When they tries to search the house for Thambaan, David refuses. After they all leaves, Madhu tells few of them to stay there as he suspects David. Meanwhile, it was revealed that Thambaan didn't come to hide in David's house and he found out that Anthony came there on the day of the accident. He recollects to David that one day when they were travelling in David's car, David told him that Thomas didn't came to the church on the day of the accident.

He asked Arivandakshan about the loads in Thomas's jeep. Arivandakshan tells that the jeep didn't have any load in the accident spot but when Anthony entered the jeep there were full load. David then reveals that Thambaan was right and Anthony came there. A flashback reveals that, David was none other than Vargheese's son and he killed Anthony as he wanted his kids to feel the pain of not having a father as his father is dead because of Thambaan and Anthony. When Thomas witnessed the murder, David had killed him as well and staged it as an accident. Thambaan tells David to kill him also if he wants but to not harm Rachel and Alex. He recollects that when he fought with George's men, one of them told that David told them to do it. David plans to kill Thambaan with a knife, but Thambaan kills him with a gun and avenges Anthony's and Thomas's murder. When Madhu and his men comes there and finds David dead, Arivandakshan tells them that David committed suicide even though he knew that Thambaan killed him. Thambaan heads back to the village.

== Cast ==
- Suresh Gopi as Thambaan
- Renji Panicker as Antony Joseph
- Rachel David as Rachel Antony
  - Baby Parthavi as Young Rachel
- Evan Anil as Alex Antony
- Muthumani as Mary Antony
- Shanker Ramakrishnan as P.C. K. P. Varghese
- Jubil Rajan P. Dev as Kuzhiyil George
- Sadiq as Head Constable Aravindakshan, a kind-hearted police officer who is supportive of Thambaan
- Rajesh Sharma as Pappachan
- Kichu Tellus as SI Madhu, a corrupt police officer who is George's friend
- Padmaraj Ratheesh as Fr. David Varghese
- Sreejith Ravi as SI Muralidharan
- Suresh Krishna as Vaalara Maani
- Chali Pala as Varkey
- Pauly Valsan as Ponnamma
- Santhosh Keezhattoor as Thomas
- Santhakumari as Leelamma
- Anjali Nair as Padmini
- Anitha Nair as Usha
- Ambika Mohan as Annamma
- Aman Panicker as Ajay
- Aristo Suresh
- Gilu Joseph as Varghese's wife and David's mother
- Ajmal as James
- Jaise Jose as Rajan
- Rajan P. Dev as Kuzhiyil Chandy (Photo Presence)

== Production ==
=== Development ===
Speculations about Nithin Renji Panicker directing Suresh Gopi in the sequel of Lelam (1997) were reported in medias by late 2016. He later confirmed about the film which was to be written and produced by his father Renji Panicker. However, due to technical reasons, the filming of the movie got delayed and by this time Nithin had planned another thriller starring Suresh Gopi and Lal. The film reportedly set against the backdrop of a forest was said to have Idukki as the main location. Suresh Gopi was said to portray a two-shaded character. On 27 October 2019, the title of the film was officially announced. Due to other work commitments, Lal opted out of the film and Renji Panicker replaced him. Filming was set to commence by late January 2020.

=== Filming ===
Principal photography began on 25 January 2020, in Kattappana, Kerala. Suresh Gopi joined the sets on 27 January 2020. Goodwill Entertainments' Joby George was the film's producer. It also features Rachel David, Muthumani, Sujith Shankar, Alencier Ley Lopez and Kannan Rajan P. Dev in pivotal roles. National award-winning cinematographer Nikhil S. Praveen, music director Ranjin Raj and editor Mansoor Muthutty were confirmed as part of the crew. The film's post production works began on 1 June 2020.

== Music ==
Kaaval

Soundtrack album by Ranjin Raj
- Genre: Feature film soundtrack
- Length: 8:39
- Language: Malayalam
- Label: Goodwill Entertainments

The film score has been composed by Ranjin Raj. The lyrics were written by BK Harinarayanan.

Kaaval (Original Motion Picture Soundtrack)
No.	Title	Lyrics	Singer(s)	Length
1.	"Ennomal Nidhiyalle"	BK Harinarayanan	Madhu Balakrishnan	4:38
2.	"Kaarmekham Moodunnu"	BK Harinarayanan	KS Chithra	4:01

== Release ==
In January 2021, the producer turned down an offer of ₹7 crore for digital release. In early April 2021, it was reported that the theatrical release date was scheduled in July 2021, but was postponed to 25 November 2021.

=== Home media ===
Asianet and Netflix acquired the satellite and digital rights of the film. The film was released on 27 December 2021 on Netflix.

== Reception ==
Deepa Soman of The Times of India rated the film 3/5 and wrote "It's great to watch Suresh Gopi’s towering presence and action sequences on screen, for he delivers them with sincerity. Ranjin Raj has yet again offered some quality melody through this film and the song ‘Ennomal’ is sure to top music charts too for a while. The film's story or its presentation, however, aren't fetching enough to keep one genuinely invested in its proceedings. Its pace is quite sleep-inducing and even predictable in places, in the first-half. Though there is an investigative episode in the story towards the end, its late arrival doesn't help trigger a sense of engagement, at that point".
