= Enippadikal (film) =

Indian film by Thoppil Bhasi

- Directed by: Thoppil Bhasi
- Screenplay by: Thoppil Bhasi
- Based on: Enippadikal by Thakazhi Sivasankara Pillai
- Starring: Madhu; Sharada; Jayabharathi; Kaviyoor Ponnamma
- Cinematography: P. Ramaswami
- Edited by: G. Venkittaraman
- Music by: G. Devarajan; Swathi Thirunal
- Production company: KPAC Films
- Release date: 9 February 1973
- Country: India
- Language: Malayalam

Enippadikal (transl. Rungs of the ladder) is a 1973 Indian Malayalam-language film, written and directed by Thoppil Bhasi based on Thakazhi Sivasankara Pillai's novel of the same name. The film stars Madhu, Sharada, Jayabharathi and Kaviyoor Ponnamma in the lead roles. It is based on the novel of the same name by Thakazhi Sivasankara Pillai. Compositions by Travancore king Swathi Thirunal were also used in the film.

== Cast ==
- Madhu
- Sharada
- Jayabharathi
- Kaviyoor Ponnamma
- KPAC Lalitha
- Adoor Bhasi
- Sankaradi
- Adoor Pankajam
- Alummoodan
- Bahadoor
- Anandavally
- Jameela Malik
- Kottarakkara Sreedharan Nair
- S. P. Pillai
- KPAC Beatrice

== Soundtrack ==
The music was composed by G. Devarajan and Swathi Thirunal and the lyrics were written by Vayalar, Swathi Thirunal, Jayadevar and Irayimman Thampi. Poems by Irayimman Thampi and verses from Jayadeva's “Geetagovindam” included in the film were set to tune by Devarajan. The song "Praananaadhanenikku Nalkiya", despite its popularity, was banned by All India Radio for a while due to its explicit lyrics.

No.	Song	Singers	Lyrics	Length (m:ss)
1	"Kanakakunnil Ninnu"	P. Madhuri	Vayalar	
2	"Onnaam Maanam Poomaanam"	K. J. Yesudas	Vayalar	
3	"Pankajaakshan Kadalvarnan"	P. Leela, Chorus	Vayalar	
4	"Praananaadhanenikku Nalkiya"	P. Madhuri	Irayimman Thampi	
5	"Saarasa Suvadana"	M. G. Radhakrishnan, Neyyattinkara Vasudevan	Swathi Thirunal	
6	"Swaathanthryam"	P. Jayachandran, P. Madhuri	Vayalar	
7	"Yaahi Maadhava"	P. Madhuri, Chorus	Jayadeva	
