= National Film Award for Best Direction (non-feature film) =

Indian film award

- National award for contributions to non-feature films
- Awarded for: Excellence in cinematic direction achievement
- Sponsored by: National Film Development Corporation of India
- Rewards: Swarna Kamal (Golden Lotus); ₹3,00,000
- First award: 2000
- Most recent winner: Anand L. Rai, Statue of Unity: Ekta Ka Prateek (2024)

The National Film Award for Best Direction is one of the National Film Awards presented annually by the National Film Development Corporation of India. It is one of several awards presented for non-feature films and awarded with Swarna Kamal (Golden Lotus).

The award was instituted in 2000, at 48th National Film Awards and awarded annually for films produced in the year across the country, in all Indian languages.

== Winners ==
Award includes 'Swarna Kamal' (Golden Lotus) and cash prize. Following are the award winners over the years:

List of award recipients, showing the year (award ceremony), film(s) and language(s)
Year	Director(s)	Film(s)	Language(s)	Refs.
2000 (48th)	Arun Vasant Khopkar	Rasikpriya	Hindi and English	
2001 (49th)	Buddhadeb Dasgupta	Jorasanko Thakurbari	English	
2002 (50th)	Anjali Panjabi	A Few Things I Know About Her	English	
2003 (51st)	Arvind Sinha	Kaya Poochhe Maya Se	Hindi	
2004 (52nd)	Umesh Vinayak Kulkarni	Girni	Marathi	
2005 (53rd)	Ganesh Shankar Gaikwad	Voices Across the Oceans	English and Hindi	
2006 (54th)	Ramesh Asher	Ek Aadesh – Command For Choti	Hindi	
2007 (55th)	Jayaraj	Vellapokkathil	Malayalam	
2008 (56th)	Umesh Vinayak Kulkarni	Three of Us	Only Music	
2009 (57th)	No Award			
2010 (58th)	Arunima Sharma	Shyam Raat Seher	Hindi	
2011 (59th)	Iram Ghufran	There is Something in the Air	Hindi, Urdu and English	
2012 (60th)	Vikrant Pawar	Kaatal	Marathi	
2013 (61st)	Pranjal Dua	Chidiya Udh	–	
2014 (62nd)	Renu Savant	Aaranyak	Marathi and English	
2015 (63rd)	Christo Tomy	Kamuki	Malayalam	
2016 (64th)	Aaditya Jambhale	Aaba... Aiktaay Na?	Marathi	
2017 (65th)	Nagraj Manjule	Pavasacha Nibandha	Marathi	
2018 (66th)	Gautam Vaze	Aai Shappath	Marathi	
2019 (67th)	Sudhanshu Saria	Knock Knock Knock	English and Bengali	
2020 (68th)	R. V. Ramani	Oh That’s Bhanu	English, Tamil, Malayalam and Hindi	
2021 (69th)	Bakul Matiyani	Smile Please	Hindi	
2022 (70th)	Miriam Chandy Menacherry	From the Shadows	English, Bengali and Hindi	
2023 (71st)	Piyush Thakur	The First Film	Hindi	
2024 (72nd)	Aanand L. Rai	Statue Of Unity: Ekta Ka Prateek	Hindi	
