= Enippadikal (novel) =

Novel by Thakazhi Sivasankara Pillai (1964)

- Author: Thakazhi Sivasankara Pillai
- Original title: ഏണിപ്പടികൾ
- Language: Malayalam
- Publisher: Sahithya Pravarthaka Co-operative Society
- Publication date: 1964
- Publication place: India

Enippadikal (Malayalam: ഏണിപ്പടികൾ, English: Rungs of the Ladder) is a Malayalam novel written by Thakazhi Sivasankara Pillai and published by Sahithya Pravarthaka Co-operative Society in 1964. The central character of the novel is Kesava Pillai, who joins the state government service as a clerk and goes up the ladder in government service through treacherous means. The novel won the Kerala Sahitya Akademi Award for Novel in 1965. The novel was adapted into films twice: first as "Enippadikal" in 1973, and later as "Vasthavam" in 2006, starring Prithviraj.

== Plot summary ==
The protagonist, Kesava Pillai, starts as a clerk in government service and gradually progresses by using unethical means to reach the top. He falls in love with his colleague, Thankamma, but due to family pressure, he marries someone else. Despite this, he maintains a relationship with Thankamma, who happens to be the niece of the Chief Secretary to the Government. Kesava Pillai manipulates this connection to climb up the ladder and eventually becomes the Chief Secretary himself. Meanwhile, Thankamma transforms into a sannyasini, and Kesava continues his relationship with her. The story concludes with Kesava Pillai being forced into premature retirement by a new ministry that exposes his treachery.
