= Ashraf Gurukkal =

- Born: Eriyad, Kodungallur, Kerala, India
- Occupations: Actor, action choreographer, stunt co-ordinator, director
- Years active: 1988–present

Ashraf Gurukkal is a Kalari Gurukkal, stunt and action choreographer. He was born in Eriyad, near Kodungallur in the Indian state of Kerala. He began working as a Kalari trainer in the region in 1989. His debut came in the typical Kalari choreography in the Kamal directed blockbuster title, Peruvannapurathe Visheshangal. He continues in the fields as a stunt choreographer, production executive, production controller, actor in TV serials, as well as Malayalam cinema.
