= Bhayanakam =

- Directed by: Jayaraj
- Screenplay by: Jayaraj
- Based on: Coir (1978) by: Takazhy Sivasankara Pillai
- Produced by: Sureshkumar Muttath
- Starring: Renji Panicker; Asha Sarath
- Cinematography: Nikhil S. Praveen
- Edited by: Jinu Sobha; Afsal A. M
- Music by: Vaisakh Somnath
- Release date: 20 July 2018 (India)
- Country: India
- Language: Malayalam

Bhayanakam (English: Fearsome) is a 2018 Indian Malayalam–language period drama war film directed by Jayaraj, produced by Sureshkumar Muttath, and stars writer-turned-actor Renji Panicker and Asha Sarath. The film is an adaptation of two chapters from Takazhy Sivasankara Pillai's epic Malayalam novel Coir (1978). The production design for the film was carried out by artist K. M. V. Namboothiri. The film is the sixth movie in director Jayaraj's "Navarasa Series".

The story is set in Kuttanad and its backwaters in central Kerala during World War II and revolves around a postman, who delivers money orders at homes of those who have joined the army. When the war intensifies, he starts bringing in telegrams declaring people dead and he slowly becomes an omen of death. The film was praised by the critics for acting performance of the lead (Panicker), the production design, and cinematography. The Times of India, giving a rating of four starts out of five, called the film "a stunningly crafted poetic story of a postman and a land that is stricken by the fear of death".

The film won three awards—Best Direction, Best Adapted Screenplay (Jayaraj) and Best Cinematography (Nikhil S. Praveen)—at the 2018 National Film Awards. The film also won Best Music Director (M. K. Arjunan) and Best Colourist at the 2018 Kerala State Film Awards.

== Cast ==
- Renji Panicker as the postman — handicapped in World War I. "A role in which Renji Panicker comes up with probably the finest performance of his recently launched acting career", wrote the Hindu newspaper.
- Asha Sarath as Gouri Kunjamma, in whose house the postman lives and whose two sons are in the Army.
- Gireesh Sopanam
- Vavachan
- Kumarakaom Vasudevan
- Sabitha Jayaraj
- Vaishnavi Venugopal

== Awards ==
National Film Awards 2018

- National Film Award for Best Director – Jayaraj
- National Film Award for Best Adapted Screenplay – Jayaraj
- National Film Award for Best Cinematography – Nikhil S. Praveen

Kerala State Film Awards 2018

- Best Music Director – M. K. Arjunan

Beijing International Film Festival 2019

- Best Cinematography – Nikhil S. Praveen
