= Thakazhi Sivasankara Pillai =

Indian novelist (1912-1999)

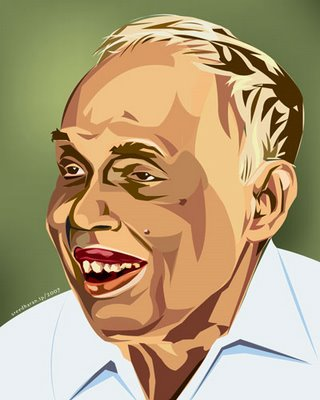
- Born: 17 April 1912; Thakazhy, Alappuzha, Kingdom of Travancore, British India (present-day Alappuzha, Kerala, India)
- Died: 10 April 1999 (aged 86); Thakazhy, Alappuzha, Kerala, India
- Occupation: Writer
- Spouse: Kamalakshi Amma
- Parent(s): Poypallikalathil Sankara Kurup; Aripurathuveettil Parvathy Amma
- Relatives: Guru Kunchu Kurup (Paternal Uncle), Raj Nair (Grandson), Velikkakath Parameshwara Kaimal (Paternal Grandfather)
- Writing career
- Pen name: Thakazhi
- Genres: Novel, short story
- Subject: Social aspects
- Notable awards: 1994 Ezhuthachan Puraskaram; 1985 Padma Bhushan; 1984 Jnanapith Award; 1984 Vayalar Award; 1957 Sahitya Akademi Award; 1965 Kerala Sahitya Akademi Award; Sahitya Akademi Fellowship; Kerala Sahitya Akademi Fellowship
- Movement: Realism

Thakazhi Sivasankara Pillai (17 April 1912 – 10 April 1999), popularly known as Thakazhi after his place of birth, was an Indian novelist and short story writer of Malayalam literature. He wrote over 30 novels and novellas and over 600 short stories focusing on the lives of the oppressed classes. Known for his works such as Kayar (Coir, 1978) and Chemmeen (Prawns, 1956), Pillai was a recipient of the Padma Bhushan, the third highest Indian civilian award. He was also a recipient of the Jnanpith Award, India's highest literary award, in 1984 for the novel Kayar.

== Biography ==
Thakazhi Sivasankara Pillai was born on 17 April 1912 in Thakazhy, a small village in Kuttanad in present-day Alappuzha district of Kerala to Poypallikalathil Sankara Kurup, who was the brother of Guru Kunchu Kurup, a doyen of Kathakali and Aripurathuveettil Parvathy Amma. After early tutoring by his father and Chakkampurathu Kittu Asan, a local teacher, Pillai had his primary education at a local school in Thakazhi and passed 7th standard examination from the English School in Ambalappuzha. Subsequently, he did his high school education, first at a high school in Vaikom and later at the NSS High school in Karuvatta, where he had the opportunity to study under Kainikkara Kumara Pillai, who was the headmaster of the school during that period. After passing 10th standard, he moved to Thiruvananthapuram and passed the pleader examination from the Government Law College, Thiruvananthapuram. He started his career as a reporter at Kerala Kesari daily but moved to legal career by practising under a lawyer named P. Parameshwaran Pillai at the munsif court of Ambalappuzha. It was during this time that he was attracted by the communist movement and participated in the functioning of the Sahitya Pravarthaka Sahakarana Sangham (Writers' Cooperative Society). He presided Kerala Sahitya Akademi and was also associated with Sahitya Akademi as a member of its general council.

Pillai married Thekkemuri Chembakasseril Chirakkal Kamalakshy Ammai, whom he affectionately called as Katha, in 1934 and the couple had one son and four daughters. He died on 10 April 1999, at the age of 86 (a week before his 87th birthday), survived by his wife, who died on 1 June 2011, and their five children.

== Literary career ==
Pillai, whose works would later earn him the moniker, Kerala Maupassant, started writing at an early age and his associations with Kainikkara Kumara Pillai during his school days and with Kesari Balakrishna Pillai during his Thiruvananthapuram days are known to have helped the aspiring writer in his career, it was the latter who introduced him to European literature. His first short story was Daridran (The Poor) which was published in 1929. In 1934 came out Thakazhi's first published volume, Puthumalar (New Blossoms) which was a collection of short stories. This was soon followed by his first novel Thyagathinu Prathiphalam (Fruits of Sacrifice) which primarily dealt with the social injustices prevalent during that time. This was the first of his 39 novels; he also published 21 anthologies composed of over 600 short stories, two plays and four memoirs.

Pillai's literary works are known to portray the society in Kerala in the mid-20th century. Thottiyude Makan (Scavenger's Son), a story about a scavenger who strives unsuccessfully to keep his son from continuing the family profession was published in 1947 and is known to be the first realistic novel in Malayalam literature. His political novel, Randidangazhi (Two Measures, 1948), projected the evils of the feudal system that prevailed in Kerala then, especially in Kuttanad. The film adaptation, directed and produced by P. Subramaniam from a screenplay by Thakazhi himself, received a certificate of merit at the National Film Awards in 1958.

In 1956, Pillai published his love epic Chemmeen (Prawns), which was a departure from his earlier line of realism and the novel received critical acclaim, becoming the first post-colonial Indian novel to be translated into English; the English translation was accepted into the Indian Series of UNESCO Collection of Representative Works. It told a tragic love story against the backdrop of a fishing village in Alappuzha. The novel and its film adaptation, also titled Chemmeen (1965), earned him national and international fame. Chemmeen was translated into 19 world languages and adapted into film in 15 countries. The film adaptation, directed by Ramu Kariat, won the National Film Award for Best Feature Film in 1965. His next notable work was Enippadikal (Rungs of the Ladder), published in 1964, which traces the careerism of an ambitious bureaucrat whose lust for power and position becomes his own undoing. The novel was adapted into a movie in 1973 by Thoppil Bhasi. Anubhavangal Paalichakal, another novel he published in 1966, was also made into a feature film by K. S. Sethumadhavan, in 1971, with Sathyan, Prem Nazir and Sheela in the lead roles. The story "Vellapokkathil", written in the mid-1960s, is considered one of his best stories. It was adapted into a short film of the same name by Jayaraj in 2007.

Pillai wrote Kayar (Coir) in 1978, a long novel extending to over 1000 pages, covering the history of several generations in Kuttanad for over 200 years and is considered by many as his masterpiece, n spite of the popularity of Chemmeen. The novel deals with hundreds of characters over four generations, bringing back to life an axial period (1885–1971) during which feudalism, matriliny, and bonded labour gave way to conjugal life and to universal access to land ownership, and later, to decolonisation.

Pillai wrote his only play in 1946 titled Thottilla, which was a social drama; it was performed on many stages by Kerala People's Arts Club. He published four autobiographical books and two other works. Four of his short stories were the base of a film, Naalu Pennungal, made by Adoor Gopalakrishnan in 2007, which he termed as his homage to the writer.

== Awards and honours ==
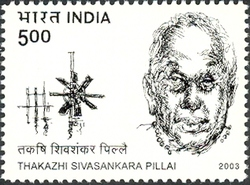
Pillai on a 2003 stamp of India

Pillai received the Sahitya Akademi Award in 1957 for the love epic, Chemmeen. Kerala Sahitya Akademi selected Enippadikal for their annual award for novels in 1965. His Novel, Kayar was selected for the Vayalar Award in 1984, and he received the highest Indian literary award, Njanapeedam in 1984 and a year later, the Government of India awarded him the third highest civilian honour of the Padma Bhushan. In 1986 he was conferred with an honorary doctorate (D.Litt) by University of Kerala. Sahitya Akademi elected him as a distinguished fellow in 1989; he had already been a distinguished fellow of the Kerala Sahitya Akademi by then. In 1994, the Government of Kerala awarded him Ezhuthachan Puraskaram, their highest literary honour. In 1996 he was awarded an honorary doctorate (D.Litt) by Mahatma Gandhi University. India Post issued a commemorative postage stamp depicting his image in 2003, under the Jnanapith Award Winners series. Sahitya Akademi commissioned a documentary film on the life of Pillai to be made and M. T. Vasudevan Nair made Thakazhi, a documentary film of 57 minutes length, which was released a year before Pillai's death in 1998. The Government of Kerala acquired Sankaramanagala, the ancestral home of Pillai, in 2000 and a museum, Thakazhi Memorial Museum was set up in 2001, honoring the writer's memory.

== Bibliography ==
=== Novels ===
- Thakazhi Sivasankara Pillai (1934). Thyagathinu Prathiphalam. Poorna Publications. ISBN 8171805302. ASIN 8171805302.
- Thakazhi Sivasankara Pillai (1956). Chemmeen. Westport, Conn.: Greenwood Press. ISBN 0313212139. OCLC 4194651.
- Thakazhi Sivasankara Pillai (1963). Avante Smaranakal: Novel. Sahitya Pravarthaka.
- Thakazhi Sivasankara Pillai (1948). Randidangazhi. DC Books. ISBN 817130673X.
- Thakazhi Sivasankara Pillai (1996). Thottiyude Makan (1st ed.). Kottayam: DC Books. ISBN 8171306373. OCLC 37694031.
- Thakazhi Sivasankara Pillai (1950). Thendivargam. Poorna Publications. ISBN 9788130000244.
- Thakazhi Sivasankara Pillai (2006). Enippadikal. DC Books. ISBN 978-81-7130-722-7.
- Thakazhi Sivasankara Pillai (1967). Anubhavangal Palichakal. Current Books. ASIN B007E4VG0I.
- Thakazhi Sivasankara Pillai (1978). Kayar. DC Books. ISBN 978-81-7130-071-6.
- Sivasankara Pilla, Thakazhi (1975). Punnapra Vayalaarinu Sesham. DCB.
- Thakazhi Sivasankara Pillai (1977). Azhiyakkurukku.
- Thakazhi Sivasankara Pillai (2007). Baloonukal. Poorna Publications. ISBN 9798171805234.
- Sivasankara Pilla, Thakazhi (1991). Nellum thengayum. Thrissur: Current Books. Archived from the original on 4 February 2019.
- Sivasankara Pilla, Thakazhi (1990). Oru Erinjadangal. Kottayam: S.P.C.S.
- Sivasankara Pilla, Thakazhi (1996). Paramaarthangal. Kozhikode: Poorna Publications. ISBN 9788171805280. Archived from the original on 4 February 2019.
- Sivasankara Pilla, Thakazhi (2004). Irupathonnaam noottaandu. Thrissur: Kerala Sahitya Academy. ISBN 9788176900690.
- Sivasankara Pilla, Thakazhi (1996). Pathithapankajam. Kozhikode: Poorna Publications. ISBN 9788171805259. Archived from the original on 4 February 2019.
- Sivasankara Pilla, Thakazhi (2007). Nellum thengayum. Kozhikode: Poorna Publications. ISBN 9788130007038. Archived from the original on 4 February 2019.
- Sivasankara Pilla, Thakazhi (2007). Kure manushyarute katha. Kozhikode: Poorna Publications. ISBN 9788130006185. Archived from the original on 4 February 2019.
- Sivasankarapilla, Thakazhi (3 February 2019). Thakazhiyude novalukal. Kottayam: DC Books. ISBN 9788126431786.
- Thakazhi (1968). Pappiammayum makkalum. Current books, Thrissur: Current Books. Archived from the original on 4 February 2019.
- Thakazhi (1969). Ouseppinde Makkal. Current books, Thrissur: Current Books. Archived from the original on 4 February 2019.
- Thakazhi (1969). Anjupennungal. Current books, Thrissur: Current Books.
- Sivasankarapilla Thakazhi (1967). Chukku. Kottayam: N.B.S. Archived from the original on 4 February 2019.
- Sivasankarapillai, Thakazhi (1972). Kodipoya mukhangal. Sahithya pravarthakasahakaranasangam: Sahithya pravarthakasahakaranasangam. Archived from the original on 4 February 2019.
- Sivasankara Pillai, Thakazhi (1977). Thakazhiyude Adhyakala Novelukal. Sahithya Pravarthaka Co: Sahithya Pravarthaka Co.
- Thakazhi (1974). Akathalam. Sahithya Pra. Co. s: Sahithya Pra. Co. s.
- Thakazhi sivasankarapillai (1967). Vilpanakkari. Mangalodayam: Mangalodayam.
- Sivasankara Pillai, Thakazhi (1996). Jeevitham Sundaramaanu, Pakshe. Kozhikode, Poorna.
- Sivasankara Pillai, Thakazhi (1948). Thalayodu. Kottayam, NBS.
- Sivasankara Pillai, Thakazhi; Author (2004). Aakaasam. Kottayam, D C Books. ISBN 9788126407972.
- Sivasankarapilla Thakazhi (1965). Dharmaneethiyo Alla Jeevitham. THRISSUR: THE MANGALODAYAM.
- Sivasankarapilla Thakazhi (1984). Perillaakatha. KOTTAYAM: S P C S.
- Sivasankara Pillai Thakazhi. Pennu. Kozhikode.
- Sivasankara Pillai Thakazhi (1971). Pennaayi Pirannaal. Kottayam: Author.
- Sivasankara Pillai Thakazhi. Nurayum Pathayum. Poorna Publications. ISBN 9788130000152.
- Sivasankara Pillai Thakazhi. Oru Premathinte Bakki. Poorna Publications. ISBN 9788130003740.
- Shivashankarapilla, Thakazhi. (1983). Oru Manushyante Mukham. DC Books.
- Shivashankarapilla, Thakazhi (1966). Maamsathinte Vili. Champakkulam: B K M BOOK DEPOT.
- Susheelan
- Thakazhiyude Lakhunovelukal

=== Short story anthologies ===
- Venugopalan, P., ed. (2015). Thakazhi Sampoorna Kathakal: 3 Vols. Thrissur: Green Books. ISBN 9788184234442.
- Sivasankara Pilla, Takazhi (2014). Theranjedutha kathakal. Kottayam: Sahitya Pravarthaka Sahagarana Sangham. ISBN 9789384075538.
- Sivasankara Pilla, Thakazhi (2016). Kathakal. Kottayam: D C books. ISBN 9788126464425.
- Sivasankarapillai Thakazhi (1995). Thakazhiyude kadhakal. D.C. Books, Kottayam: D.C. Books, Kottayam.
- Thakazhi (1969). Changathikal. Mangalodayam: Mangalodayam. Archived from the original on 4 February 2019.
- Sivasankara Pillai, Thakazhi (1992). Oru Kuttanaadan Katha.
- Sivasankara Pillai, Thakazhi (1993). Jeevithathinte Oredu. Kottayam, DCB.
- Sivasankara Pillai, Thakazhi (2007). Vellappokkathilum mattu pradhaana kathakalum (Ed.5 ed.). Kottayam, D C Books. ISBN 9788126405589.
- Sivasankara Pillai, Thakazhi (2004). Irupathonnaam noottaandu: samaaharikkaatha 16 kathakal. Thrissur, Kerala Sahithya Akademi Ke. ISBN 9788176900690.
- Sivasankara Pillai, Thakazhi; Author (2009). Nithyakanyaka: kathakal. Kottayam, Sahitya Pravarthaka Co-operative Society Ltd.
- Sivasankara Pilai, Thakazhi (1980). Kure kathaapaathrangal (in Malayalam). Kottayam, D C books.
- Sivasankara Pillai Thakazhi (1969). Ekanthapathikan. KADAPPAKKADA: N B S.
- Sivasankara Pillai Thakazhi (1958). Njan Piranna Nadu. Thrissur: Current Books.
- Thakazhi (1969). Anjupennungal. Current books, Thrissur: Current Books.
- Inquilab (1952)
- Khoshayathra
- Pativratha (Chaste Wife, 1946)
- Pratheekshakal
- Puthumalar
- Adiyozhukkukal
- Prathijna
- Njarakkangal
- Makalude Makal
- Kanakku Theerkkal
- Aadhyathe Prasavam
- Alinganam
- Charithrasathyangal

=== Autobiographies ===
- Thakazhi sivasankarapillai (1967). Ente Balyakala kadha. Mangalodayam: Mangalodayam.
- Shivasankara Pillai, Thakazhi (2007). Athmakatha. Thrissur: Green Books.
- Sivasankara Pillai, Thakazhi (1985). Ormayude Theerangalil.
- Ente Vakeel Jeevitham

=== Plays ===
- Thakazhi sivasankarapillai (1946). Thottilla. KPAC.

=== Other works ===
- Sivasankarapilla Thakazhi (1966). American Thirasseela. Mangalodayam: Mangalodayam.
- Sivasankara Pillai, Thakazhi (2000). Ente Ullile Kadal. Kottayam, D C Books. ISBN 9788126401178.

=== Translations into other languages ===
- Thakazhi Sivasankara Pillai; Anita Nair (translator) (2016). Chemmeen. Seagull Books. ISBN 978-0-85742-391-7.
- Thakazhi Sivasankara Pillai; Narayana Menon (translator) (1975). Chemmeen: a Novel: Transl. by Narayana Menon; Introduction by Santha Rama Rau : - 5. Impression. Jaico.
- Thakazhi Sivasankara Pillai; R. E. Asher (translator) (1990). Scavenger's Son. Orient Paperback.
- Thakazhi Sivasankara Pillai (2002). கயிறு (Coir). Sahitya Akademi. ISBN 978-81-260-1078-3.
- Thakazhi Sivasankara Pillai (1987). செம்மீன் (Chemmeen). Sahitya Akademi.
- Thakazhi Sivasankara Pillai (1983). Machhuare (in Hindi). Sahitya Akademi.
- Thakazhi Sivasankara Pillai (1 January 1994). SHUNGTAM (KONKANI IN KANNADA SCRIPT). Raknno Prakashan, Mangalore. ISBN 978-0-10-000784-0.
- Sivasankara Pillai, Thakazhi. The unchaste. Delhi: Hind Pocket Books.
- Pillai, Thakazhi Sivasankara (1974). The iron rod. New Delhi: sterling publishers.
- Sivasankara Pillai, Takazhi (1976). Rungs of the ladder. Translated by C. Paul Verghese. Arnold-Heinemann (India).
- Sivasankarapilla, Takazhi (1984). The Children of Ouseph. Translated by Mary Mathai, Samuel Mathai. New Delhi: Arnold-Heinemann.
- Thakazhi Sivasankara Pillai (1996). In the Flood; The Blind Man Gratified; Death of Gandhiji. Haritham, 7, 1996.

=== Films ===
- Nurayum Pathayum
- Naalu Pennungal
- Chemmeen
- Enippadikal
- Anubhavangal Paalichakal
- Randidangazhi
- Chukku
- Oru Pennum Randaanum

== Critical studies on Thakazhi ==
- Annamma Jacob; Samuel, C. D; Guide (1990). Thakazhiyude novelukalile saamoohika prathibhalanam (PhD ed.). Kottayam, Mahatma Gandhi University.
- Sushama L; Benjamin D. (1992). "Thakazhiyude Cerukathaa saahityam Oru Padanam". University (PhD ed.). Trivandrum, Kerala University. hdl:10603/177076.
- Mathew, Manarcadu (2000). Thakazhiyum Basheerum koodikkaazhchakalil. Kottayam, Current Books. ISBN 9788124008195.
- Ayyappa Panicker, K.; Chandrika; Tr (1992). Thakazhi Sivasankara Pilla.
- Krishnan Patyam, O. (1994). Raajam Krishnanum Thakazhiyum(tharathamya saahithya padhanam). Kottayam, NBS.
- Sarma, V. S; Ed (1991). Thakazhiyum malayala novelum. Thiruvananthapuram, Kerala Sarvakalaasaala Malayala Vibhaagam.
- Karim, M. M. (1985). Premchandum Thakazhiyum.
- S. Karunya. Worlds of Amitav Ghosh and Thakazhi Sivasankara Pillai- Ecological Archetypes in the Select Novels. Online International Interdisciplinary Research Journal.
- Francis Zimmermann (2007). Thakazhi's KAYAR: Stories, Narrative and History in a Malayalam modern epic.
- Nidhi Malik. The fall of customs in the Chemmeen. International Journal of Applied Research.

== See also ==
- Thakazhi (film), a documentary on Thakazhi by M. T. Vasudevan Nair
- Raj Nair
