= Shantham =

2001 film directed by Jayaraj

- Directed by: Jayaraj
- Written by: P. Suresh Kumar; Madampu Kunjukuttan
- Produced by: P. V. Gangadharan
- Starring: Seema Biswas; K. P. A. C. Lalitha; I. M. Vijayan; M G Shashi; Kalamandalam Gopi; Madambu Kunjukuttan
- Cinematography: Ravi Varman
- Edited by: N P Sathish
- Music by: Kaithapram Damodaran Namboodiri Rajamani (score)
- Release date: 2001
- Running time: 95 minutes
- Country: India
- Language: Malayalam

Shantham (English: Calmness) is a Malayalam feature film directed by Jayaraj. It stars I. M. Vijayan, a former leading Indian football player, M. G. Shashi, Seema Biswas and K P A C Lalitha. The renowned Kathakali artiste Kalamandalam Gopi and the Malayalam writer Madambu Kunjukuttan have also starred in the film. It was released in 2001 and won the Swarna Kamal Award for the Best Feature Film in the 48th National Film Awards, 2001. The film was produced by P V Gangadharan. According to the citation of the Award Jury: 'Shantham addresses the very contemporary issue of political rivalry and violence in our society in an unusually imaginative way. The language of the film goes beyond the conventional narrative for appeal to calmness and good sense'. The film is the first installment in director Jayaraj's "Navarasa Series".

The film also received the National Best Supporting Actress Award for K P A C Lalitha.

This is Jayaraj's third National Award. In 1996, his film 'Desadanam', won the award for the Best Malayalam Film and in the next year he was named the Best Director.

== Plot ==
Persons on both sides of a bloody political struggle search for grace and forgiveness in this emotional drama.

Velayudhan (I M Vijayan) is a young man living in a place torn apart by civil strife. In the midst of a raging street war, he kills his best friend. He was overcome by guilt and remorse for his actions as Narayani (K P A C Lalitha), his friend's mother, tries to hold herself together while she arranges for her son's funeral. Velayudhan's mother Karthiyayani (Seema Biswas) goes to a temple and prays for her son's forgiveness despite his violence and wrongdoing. There she meets Narayani who is stricken with her own feelings of grief over the death of her child. She orders a pleading Kathiyayani to move out of her sight. in the meantime, Narayani learns more about life from the people around her. Also, the political enemies plot revenge on Velayudhan. Karthiyayani is often told that Narayani's inner turmoil and rage would boil initially and will ultimately recede into a state of calmness. Narayani barely leaves her raging mindset to curse Karthiyayani. In the due course of time, Narayani and Kartiyayani reconcile leaving behind their troubled minds. As Narayani performs spiritual homage to her son, she realizes of her other son's plan to avenge Velayudhan by killing him. A horrorstruck Narayani rushes to Velayudhan's exile and pleads him to run for his life, but he takes a knife to protect himself from any danger that may befall him. He escapes through the widespread riverbed of Bharathapuzha and sees the men approach him with weapons. Karthiyayani and Narayani run towards them and begs them to do no wrong. But they simply push them aside and move towards Velayudhan who stands ready to accept his fate. The final scene shows a group of grief-stricken mothers running towards the armed men, shouting at them to retract from the sin they are about to do. The final shot shows a gentle dragonfly resting on the very sword that is about to draw blood, emphasizing the very theme of the plot.

== Cast ==
- K.P.A.C. Lalitha as Narayani
- I.M. Vijayan as Velayudhan
- Lena as Raghavan's Wife
- Seema Biswas as Karthiyayani

== Soundtrack ==
The film had musical score composed by Kaithapram Damodaran Namboothiri. Rajamani composed the background music for the film.

== Awards ==
National Film Awards

- 2000 - National Film Award for Best Feature Film
- 2000 - National Film Award for Best Supporting Actress - K.P.A.C. Lalitha
