= Jayaraj =

Indian filmmaker

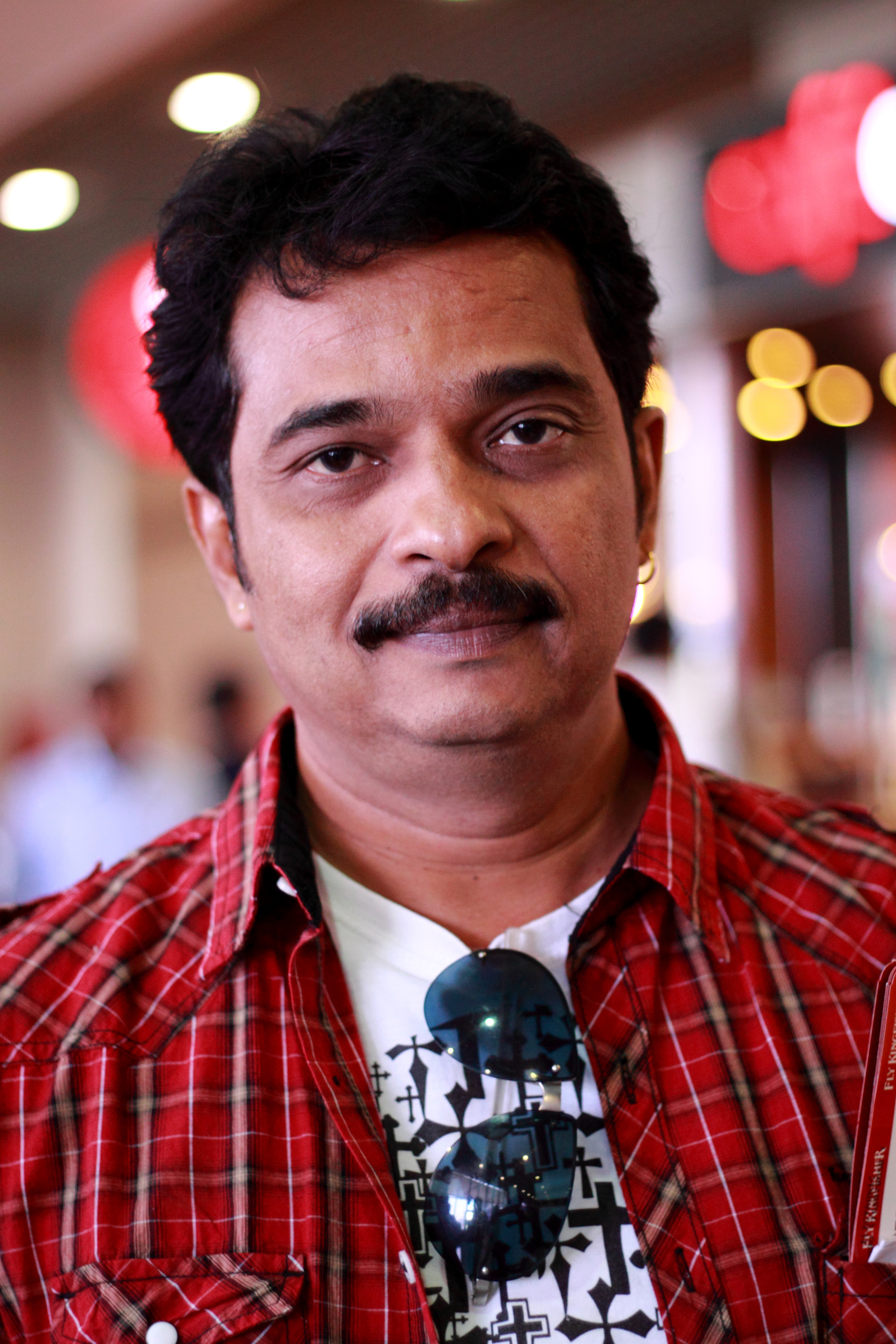
- Born: Jayarajan Rajasekharan Nair; Kottayam, Kerala, India
- Occupations: Director; Screenwriter; Producer
- Years active: 1990–present

Jayarajan Rajasekharan Nair, professionally credited as Jayaraj , is an Indian filmmaker, who predominantly works in the Malayalam film industry.

He has won many awards, including Crystal Bear at the Berlin International Film Festival, the Golden Peacock award at the IFFI, and the FIPRESCI Award from the International Federation of Film Critics. He is also a ten-time recipient of the National Film Award and several Kerala State Film Awards. His films include Paithrukam (1993), Desadanam (1996), Kaliyattam (1997), 4 The People (2004), Vellapokkathil (2007), Ottaal (2015), Veeram (2016) and Bhayanakam (2018).

== Early life ==
During his stay at Thiruvananthapuram, he attended film festivals including the International Film Festival of Kerala and watched many world classics. Kurosawa's Rashomon and DeSica's Bicycle Thieves were among them, and they influenced him immensely.

== Career ==
Film director Bharathan was impressed by Jayaraj and made him his assistant director for Chilambu (1986). Jayaraj then went on to be the assistant to Bharathan in six more films including the critically acclaimed Oru Minnaminunginte Nurunguvettam (1987) and Vaishali (1988). Jayaraj debuted as director with Vidyarambham (1990). His early career mainly produced commercially oriented films like Aakasha Kottayile Sultan (1991), Johnnie Walker (1992), High Way (1995), Thumboli Kadappuram (1995) and Arabia (1995).

Notable in his early career were Kudumbasametham (1992), Paithrukam (1993) and Sopanam (1993). Desadanam (1997) was followed by Kaliyattam (1997) which was an adaptation of Shakespeare's Othello. It won him the National Film Award for Best Direction.

In 1999 Jayaraj started his nine-film series project Navarasa with Karunam, followed by Shantham (2001). Shantham won the National Film Award for Best Feature Film. The third in the Navarasa series was Bheebhatsa, a Hindi film followed by Adbutham and Veeram. In 2018, the sixth film in the series Bhayanakam was released and had won awards for Best Direction, Best Adapted Screenplay and Best Cinematography at the 2017 National Film Awards. On 10 June 2019, Tovino Thomas officially announced and shared the poster of Roudram 2018, the seventh film in the series. While sharing the poster on Facebook Tovino wrote, "The movie is based on real-life incidents that occurred in central Travancore, during the devastating floods that Kerala survived. Roudram 2018 portrays the tempestuous ferocity of nature, and the utter helplessness of humankind before that might."

Of late he has been doing commercial and art films and is successful in both genres. While Thilakkam (2003) and 4 The People (2004) were huge commercial successes Kannaki (2002), Makalkku (2005), Daivanamathil (2005) and Ottaal (2015) were critically acclaimed. Ottaal made history, becoming the first ever Malayalam movie to have swept all the top awards in the 20-year history of the International Film Festival of Kerala. The film was one of four Malayalam films selected to be a part of the Indian Panorama at the International Film Festival of India in Goa in November 2015.

== Philanthropy ==
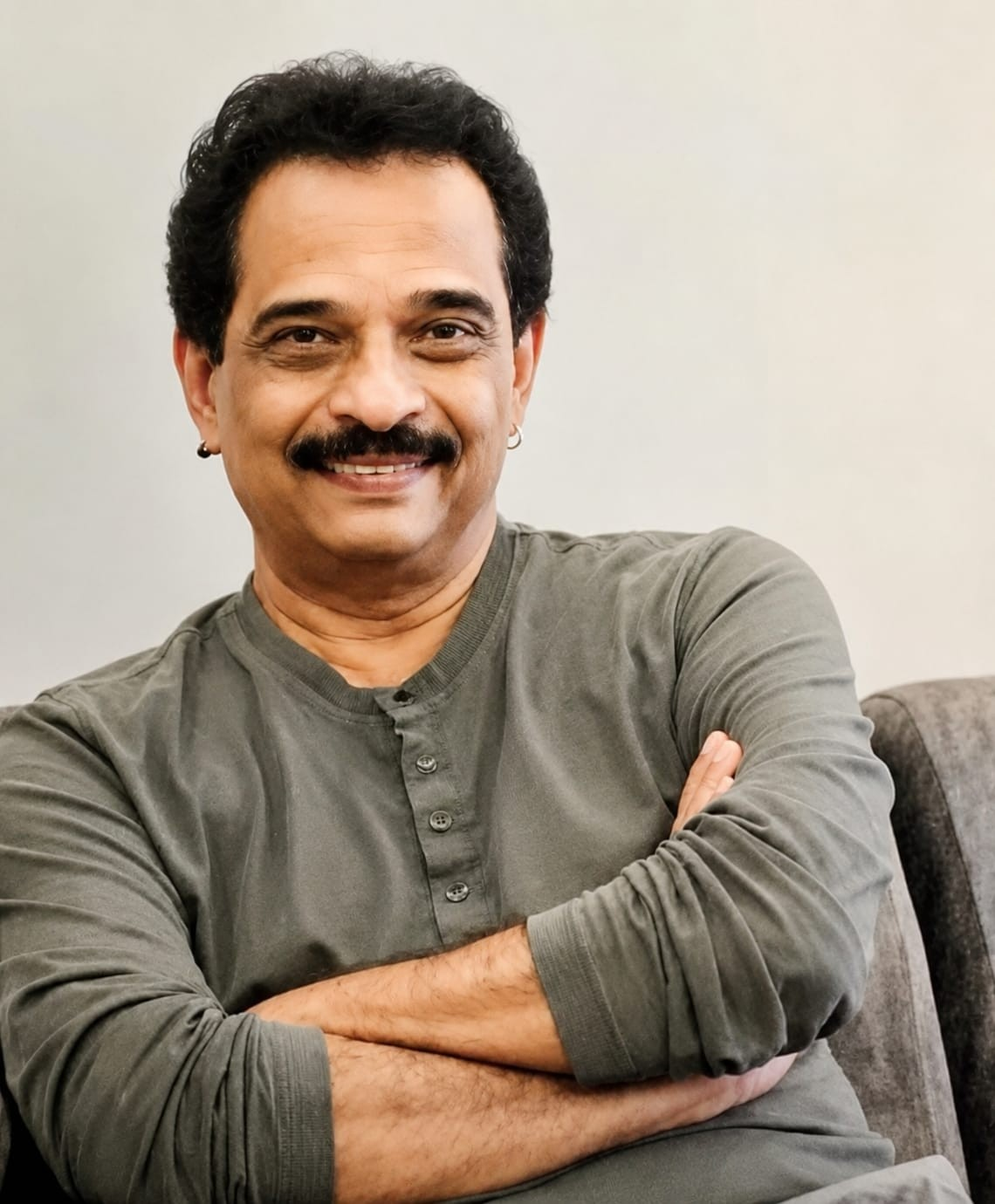
Jayaraj

In an earnest effort towards conserving nature and strengthening people's welfare, Jayaraj founded the Jayaraj Foundation in 2010 and officially launched it on 6 June 2014. World Organisation of Hope's (WOH) ambitious programme SMART (Sports, Music, Art and Recreation Therapy (Yoga and Meditation)) and Birds Club International are the two projects initiated by the foundation.

World Organisation of Hope (WOH) is an organisation aimed at building children's awareness of their rights and to protect them. The programme SMART [Sports, Music, Art and Recreation Therapy (Yoga and Meditation)] is an offshoot of WOH. It supports children and adolescents in their own struggle to secure and defend their dreams.

Birds Club International (BCI) aims at creating miniature rain forests in schools and colleges, to make a better environment both for birds and humans. It plans to bring together the future generation and integrating more of society towards nature conservation activities. Several units of BCI have been started in many schools and colleges in Kerala, with the help of the Government of Kerala, to achieve this.

== Awards ==
International awards

Year	Film	Award (s)
2022	Shabdikkunna Kalappa	Best Cinematography: Nikhil S Praveen
2018	Rebirth	Best Short Documentary , Best Director Of Short Documentary
2018	Bhayanakam	Best Film , Best Actor: Ranji Panicker in Spain, Madrid International Film Festival
2015	Ottaal	Crystal Bear, Suvarna Chakoram, FIPRESCI award, NETPAC award, Rajata Chakoram , Best Environment Film , IFFK - Best Film (Golden Crow Pendant) , Nomininee- Amnesty International Fil Festival , Nominee- Hamburg Film Festival (Michael Award)
2007	Vellapokkathil	Best Short Movie
2005	Daivanamathil	Best Film Award in Spain, Madrid International Film Festival
2000	Karunam	Golden Peacock Award, International Film Festival of India- Awards from Federation of International Film Societies, Berlin International Film Fest, Special Mention in Kerala International Film Festival.
2001	Shantham	Best Cinematography in Festival De 3 Continents, France
1996	Desadanam	Special Mention at Karlovy Vary International Film Festival in competition section.

National Film Awards

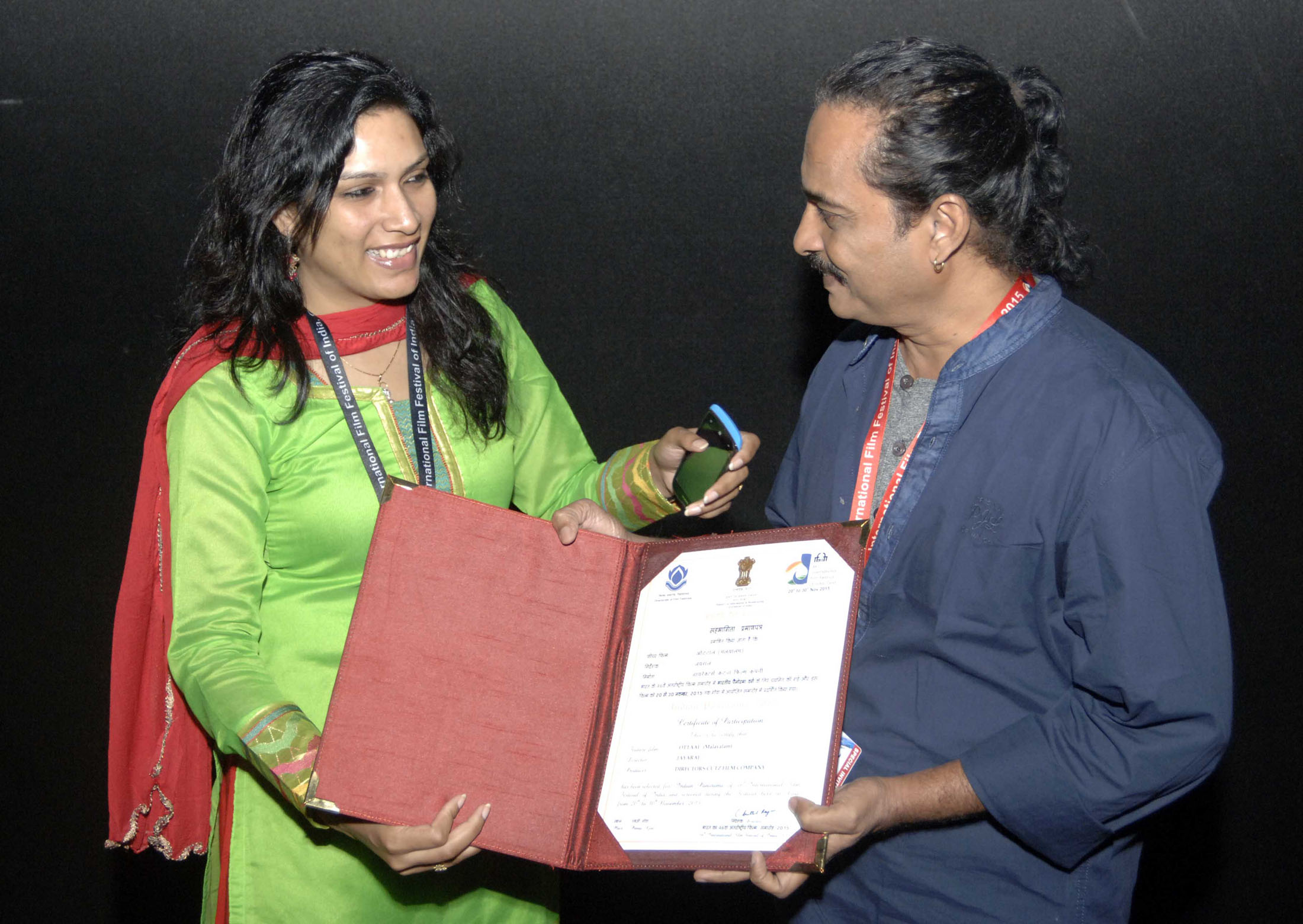
Jayaraj being felicitated at IFFI (2015)

- 1996 : Best Feature Film in Malayalam - Desadanam
- 1997 : Best Director - Kaliyattam
- 2001 : Best Film - Shantham
- 2005 : Best Film on National Integration - Daivanamathil
- 2007 : Best Non-Feature Film Direction - Vellapokkathil (The Deluge)
- 2014 : Best Film on Environment Conservation/Preservation - Ottaal
- 2017 : Best Director - Bhayanakam
- 2017 : Best Adapted Screenplay - Bhayanakam
- 2017 : Special Jury mention - Rebirth

Kerala State Film Awards

- 1992 : Kerala State Film Award for Second Best Film , Best Screenplay - Kudumbasametham
- 1996 : Kerala State Film Award for Best Director - Paitrukam
- 1996 : Kerala State Film Award for Best Director - Deshadanam
- 1997 : Best Film with Popular Appeal and Aesthetic Value - Kaliyattam
- 1999 : Kerala State Film Award for Best Film - Karunam
- 2015 : Kerala State Film Award for Best Film - Ottaal

Filmfare Awards South

- 1997 : Best Director : Kaliyattam
- 2000 : Best Director : Karunam
- 2000 : Best Film - Malayalam : Karunam

V. Shantharam Awards

- 1997 : Kaliyattam
- 2001 : Shantham

John Abraham Awards

- 2000 : Karunam
- 2012 : Vellapokkathil

Asianet Film Awards

- 2002: Asianet Film Award for Best Director for Kannaki

Ramu Karyatt Awards

- 1996 : Desadanam

P. Padmarajan Awards

- 1996 : Desadanam
- 2000 : Karunam

== Filmography ==
Year	Title	Credited as			Language	Notes	Ref(s)
Year	Title	Director	Writer	Producer	Language	Notes	Ref(s)
1990	Vidhyarambham	Yes	No	No	Malayalam		
1991	Aakasha Kottayile Sultan	Yes	Story	No	Malayalam		
1992	Johnnie Walker	Yes	Story	No	Malayalam		
1992	Kudumbasametham	Yes	No	No	Malayalam		
1993	Paithrukam	Yes	No	No	Malayalam		
1993	Sopanam	Yes	No	No	Malayalam		
1995	Arabia	Yes	No	No	Malayalam		
1995	Highway	Yes	Story	No	Malayalam		
1995	Thumboli Kadappuram	Yes	No	No	Malayalam		
1997	Desadanam	Yes	No	Yes	Malayalam		
1997	Kaliyattam	Yes	No	No	Malayalam		
1998	Sneham	Yes	No	No	Malayalam		
1998	Thalolam	Yes	No	Yes	Malayalam		
2000	Karunam	Yes	No	Yes	Malayalam	Part 2, Navarasa series.	
2000	Millennium Stars	Yes	Story	No	Malayalam		
2000	Shantham	Yes	No	No	Malayalam	Part 1, Navarasa series	
2002	Bhibatsa	Yes	No	No	Hindi	Part 3, Navarasa series	
2002	Kannaki	Yes	No	No	Malayalam		
2003	Thilakkam	Yes	No	No	Malayalam		
2004	4 the People	Yes	Story	No	Malayalam		
2004	Rain Rain Come Again	Yes	No	No	Malayalam		
2004	Yuvasena	Yes	Yes	No	Telugu	Remake of 4 the People	
2005	By the People	Yes	No	No	Malayalam		
2005	Daivanamathil	Yes	No	No	Malayalam		
2005	Makalkku	Yes	No	No	Malayalam		
2006	Adbutham	Yes	No	No	Malayalam	Part 4, Navarasa series; Released 2021	
2006	Aanachandam	Yes	No	No	Malayalam		
2006	Ashwaroodan	Yes	No	No	Malayalam		
2007	Anandabhairavi	Yes	No	Yes	Malayalam		
2008	Gulmohar	Yes	No	No	Malayalam		
2008	Of The People	Yes	No	Yes	Malayalam		
2008	Sila Nerangalil	Yes	Screenplay	No	Tamil		
2008	Vellapokkathil	Yes	No	Yes	Malayalam	Short film	
2009	Loudspeaker	Yes	Yes	Yes	Malayalam		
2011	Naayika	Yes	No	No	Malayalam		
2012	Pakarnnattam	Yes	No	No	Malayalam		
2013	Camel Safari	Yes	Story	No	Malayalam		
2015	Ottaal	Yes	No	No	Malayalam		
2016	Veeram	Yes	Screenplay	No	Malayalam; Hindi; English	Part 5, Navarasa series	
2018	Bhayanakam	Yes	Screenplay	No	Malayalam	Part 6, Navarasa series	
2019	Roudram 2018	Yes	Yes	No	Malayalam	Part 7, Navarasa series	
2020	Hasyam	Yes	Yes	No	Malayalam	Part 8, Navarasa series.	
2021	Backpackers	Yes	Yes	No	Malayalam		
2023	Kadhikan	Yes	Story	Yes	Malayalam		
2024	Manorathangal	Yes	No	No	Malayalam	Segment: "Swargam Thurakkuna Samayam"	
2025	Shanthamee Rathriyil	Yes	Yes	Yes	Malayalam		
2025	Mehfil	Yes	Yes	No	Malayalam		
2026	Aval	Yes	No	No	Malayalam		
TBA	Oru Perumgaliyattam †	Yes	No	No	Malayalam	Filming	
TBA	Niraye Thathakalulla Maram †	Yes	No	No	Malayalam	Filming	
TBA	Pramadhavanam †	Yes	No	No	Malayalam	Filming	
TBA	Prakasham Parathunna Penkutty †	Yes	No	No	Malayalam	Filming	
