= Prithviraj Sukumaran filmography =

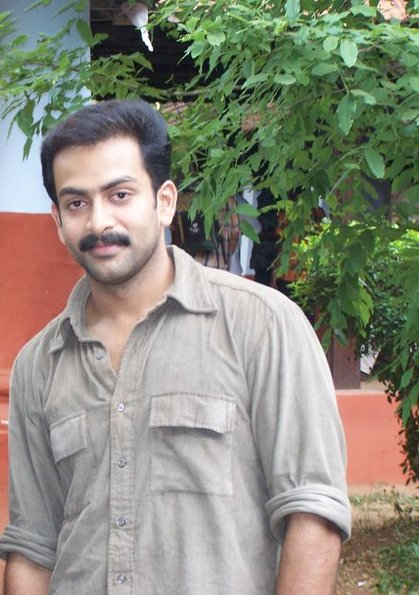

Prithviraj Sukumaran is an Indian actor, filmmaker, and playback singer who predominantly works in Malayalam films, in addition to Tamil, Hindi and Telugu films. He has worked in both mainstream and in parallel films. Prithviraj made his acting debut in 2002 with the Malayalam film, Nandanam. It was released after his second work Nakshathrakkannulla Rajakumaran Avanundoru Rajakumari. Since then, he has acted in more than 100 films.

His Tamil debut was in Kana Kandaen in 2005, and his other acclaimed film in that language include Parijatham, Mozhi, and Raavanan. He made Telugu and Bollywood (Hindi) debuts with Police Police (2010) and Aiyyaa (2012), respectively. Prithviraj has won two Kerala State Film Awards for Best Actor—in 2006 for Vaasthavam, becoming the youngest recipient at age 24, and in 2012 for Ayalum Njanum Thammil and Celluloid. Since 2012, he was associated with and has co-produced films under the company August Cinema, before leaving them in 2017. In 2018, Prithviraj launched his own production house, Prithviraj Productions, debuting with 9 (2019) starring himself. He made his directorial debut with Lucifer starring Mohanlal, released in 2019. He made his second directorial with Bro Daddy, again starring Mohanlal. He has starred in successful films such as Driving Licence (2019), Ayyappanum Koshiyum (2020), Jana Gana Mana (2022), Kaduva (2022) and Salaar: Part 1 – Ceasefire (2023).

== As actor ==
Key
†	Denotes films that have not yet been released

=== Malayalam ===
Year	Title	Role	Notes	Ref.
2002	Nakshathrakkannulla Rajakumaran Avanundoru Rajakumari	Ananthu		
2002	Stop Violence	Saathaan		
2002	Nandanam	Manu Nandakumar	Debut film; Released as third film	
2003	Vellithira	Style Raj / Raghuram		
2003	Meerayude Dukhavum Muthuvinte Swapnavum	Muthu		
2003	Swapnakoodu	Kunjoonju / Alex Chandy		
2003	Ammakilikkoodu	Vivek		
2003	Chakram	Chandrahaasan		
2004	Vellinakshatram	Vinod Varma / Chandrachoodan		
2004	Akale	Neil D'Costa		
2004	Sathyam	Sanjiv Kumar		
2005	Albudhadweep	Hari		
2005	Krithyam	Satya / Christy Lopez		
2005	Police	Shekar Varma		
2005	Daivanamathil	Anwar		
2005	Kadha	Nandhan Menon		
2005	Ananthabhadram	Anandan		
2006	Achanurangatha Veedu	Harikrishnan	Cameo appearance	
2006	Vargam	Solomon Joseph		
2006	Classmates	P. Sukumaran (Suku)		
2006	Vaasthavam	Balachandran Adiga	Won—Kerala State Film Award for Best Actor	
2006	Pakal	Nandakumar		
2006	Oruvan	SI Jeevan		
2007	Avan Chandiyude Makan	Kurian Chandy		
2007	Kaakki	Unnikrishnan		
2007	Veeralipattu	Hari		
2007	Nadiya Kollappetta Rathri	Zia Musafir	Cameo appearance	
2007	Chocolate	Shyam Balagopal		
2007	Kangaroo	Josekutty		
2008	One Way Ticket	Kunjaappu / Jehangir		
2008	Thalappavu	Naxal Joseph		
2008	Thirakkatha	Akbar Ahmed		
2008	Twenty:20	Tony	Special appearance	
2008	Lollipop	Franko		
2009	Nammal Thammil	Vicky		
2009	Calendar	Ollikkara Sojappan		
2009	Puthiya Mugham	Krishna Kumar		
2009	Robin Hood	Venkatesh / Siddhaarth		
2009	Kerala Cafe	Leon	Segment: Island Express	
2010	Punyam Aham	Narayanan Unni		
2010	Thanthonni	Vadakanveetil Kochukunju		
2010	Pokkiri Raja	Surya Narayan		
2010	Anwar	Anwar		
2010	The Thriller	Niranjan		
2011	Arjunan Saakshi	Roy Mathew		
2011	Makeup Man	Himself	Cameo appearance	
2011	Urumi	Chirakkal Kelu Nayanar / Krishna Das		
2011	City of God	Jyothilal		
2011	Manikiakkallu	Vinayachandran		
2011	Manushyamrugam	SP David J. Mathew		
2011	Veettilekulla Vazhi	Doctor		
2011	Teja Bhai & Family	Teja Bhai / Roshan Varma		
2011	Indian Rupee	Jayaprakash / JP		
2012	Masters	Sreeramakrishnan		
2012	Manjadikuru	Vicky		
2012	Hero	Tarzan Antony		
2012	Bachelor Party	John Karim	Cameo appearance	
2012	Aakashathinte Niram	Doctor	Cameo appearance	
2012	Simhasanam	Arjun Madhav		
2012	Molly Aunty Rocks!	Pranav Roy		
2012	Ayalum Njanum Thammil	Dr. Ravi Tharakan	Won—Kerala State Film Award for Best Actor	
2013	Celluloid	J.C. Daniel / Harris Daniel	Won—Critics Award for Best Actor – South	
2013	Mumbai Police	Antony Moses		
2013	Memories	Sam Alex		
2014	London Bridge	Vijay Das		
2014	7th Day	David Abraham IPS / Christopher Moriarty		
2014	Munnariyippu	Chacko	Cameo appearance	
2014	Sapthamashree Thaskaraha	Krishnanunni		
2014	Tamaar Padaar	ACP Pouran		
2015	Picket 43	Havildar Hareendran Nair		
2015	Ivide	Varun Blake		
2015	Double Barrel	Pancho		
2015	Ennu Ninte Moideen	B. P. Moideen		
2015	Amar Akbar Anthony	Amarnath		
2015	Anarkali	Shantanu		
2016	Paavada	Joy		
2016	Darvinte Parinamam	Anil Anto		
2016	James & Alice	James		
2016	Oozham	Surya		
2017	Ezra	Ranjan Mathew		
2017	Tiyaan	Aslan Mohammad / Ramaraja-2		
2017	Adam Joan	Adam Joan Pothen		
2017	Vimaanam	Venkidi / Venkideshwaran		
2018	My Story	Jayakrishnan/Jay		
2018	Koode	Joshua Thomas	100th film	
2018	Ranam	Aadhi		
2019	9	Dr. Albert Lewis / Lewis		
2019	Lucifer	Zayed Masood	Debut as director	
2019	Pathinettam Padi	Ashwin Vasudev	Cameo appearance	
2019	Brother's Day	Ronnie		
2019	Driving Licence	Hareendran		
2020	Ayyappanum Koshiyum	Koshy Kurian		
2021	Cold Case	ACP M. Sathyajith IPS		
2021	Kuruthi	Laiq		
2021	Bhramam	Ray Mathews		
2021	Star	Dr. Derick	Cameo appearance	
2022	Bro Daddy	Eesho John Kattadi	Also director	
2022	Jana Gana Mana	Adv. / DCP Aravind Swaminathan		
2022	Kaduva	Kaduvakunnel Kurian Koruthu / Kuriyachan		
2022	Theerppu	Abdulla Marakkar		
2022	Gold	Joshi S. Kunjan		
2022	Kaapa	P. N. Madhukumar / Kotta Madhu		
2024	The Goat Life	Najeeb Muhammad	Won—Kerala State Film Award for Best Actor	
2024	Guruvayoor Ambalanadayil	Anandan		
2025	L2: Empuraan	Zayed Masood	Also director	
2025	Vilayath Buddha	Mohanan "Double Mohanan" / Sandal Mohanan		
2026	Pallichattambi	Pattelar Kunjambu Nambiar	Cameo appearance	
2026	I, Nobody	Rajeevan		
2026	Khalifa: The Ruler	Mambarakkal Aamir Ali		

=== Other languages ===
Year	Title	Role	Language	Notes	Ref.
2005	Kana Kandaen	Madhan	Tamil	Dubbed into Telugu as Karthavyam and Malayalam as Kana Kandaen	
2006	Parijatham	Surendhar / Sreedhar	Tamil		
2007	Mozhi	Karthik	Tamil	Dubbed in Telugu as Maatarani Mounamidi (2012)	
2007	Satham Podathey	Ravichandran	Tamil	Dubbed in Malayalam as Kelkaatha Shabdham	
2007	Kannamoochi Yenada	Harish Venkatraman	Tamil	Dubbed in Malayalam as Aarodum Parayathe	
2008	Velli Thirai	Saravanan	Tamil	Remake of Udayananu Tharam	
2008	Abhiyum Naanum	Sudhakar	Tamil	Cameo appearance	
2009	Ninaithale Inikkum	Shivaram	Tamil	Remake of Classmates	
2010	Police Police	ASP Ravikanth	Telugu	Dubbed in Tamil as Kutrappirivu	
2010	Raavanan	SP Dev Prakash IPS	Tamil		
2012	Aiyyaa	Surya Iyer	Hindi		
2013	Aurangzeb	ACP Arya Phogat	Hindi		
2014	Kavya Thalaivan	Gomathinayagam Pillai	Tamil	Dubbed in Malayalam as Pradhi Nayagan and Telugu as Premaalayam	
2014	Kavya Thalaivan	Gomathinayagam Pillai	Tamil	Won—Tamil Nadu State Film Award for Best Villain	
2017	Naam Shabana	Tony Cake / Mikhail Warli	Hindi		
2023	Salaar: Part 1 – Ceasefire	Vardharaja Mannaar / Shiva Mannar	Telugu		
2024	Bade Miyan Chote Miyan	Kabir / Ekalavya	Hindi		
2025	Sarzameen	Colonel Vijay Menon	Hindi		
2026	Daayra	DCP Raman Kumar IPS	Hindi		
2027	Varanasi †	Rana Kumbha	Telugu	Filming	

== As director ==
Key
†	Denotes films that have not yet been released

List of Prithviraj Sukumaran film credits as a director
Year	Title	Notes
2019	Lucifer	Directorial debut; First installment of Lucifer Franchise
2022	Bro Daddy	Disney+ Hotstar film
2025	L2: Empuraan	Second installment of Lucifer Franchise

== As producer ==
Year	Film	Director	Language	Notes	Ref.
2011	Urumi	Santosh Sivan	Malayalam	Best Film at Imagineindia International Film Festival	
2011	Indian Rupee	Ranjith	Malayalam	National Film Award for Best Feature Film in Malayalam, Kerala State Film Award for Best Film	
2013	Kadal Kadannu Oru Maathukutty	Ranjith	Malayalam	August Cinema	
2014	Sapthamashree Thaskaraha	Anil Radhakrishnan Menon	Malayalam	August Cinema	
2015	Double Barrel	Lijo Jose Pellissery	Malayalam	August Cinema	
2016	Darvinte Parinamam	Jijo Antony	Malayalam	August Cinema	
2016	Anuraga Karikkin Vellam	Khalid Rahman	Malayalam	August Cinema	
2017	The Great Father	Haneef Adeni	Malayalam	August Cinema	
2018	Kaly	Najeem Koya	Malayalam	August Cinema	
2019	9	Jenuse Mohamed	Malayalam	Co-Produced with SPE Films India	
2019	Driving Licence	Lal Jr.	Malayalam	Co-Produced with Magic Frames	
2021	Kuruthi	Manu Warrier	Malayalam		
2022	Bro Daddy	Prithviraj Sukumaran	Malayalam	Project Design	
2022	Jana Gana Mana	Dijo Jose Antony	Malayalam	Co-Produced with Magic Frames	
2022	Kaduva	Shaji Kailas	Malayalam	Co-Produced with Magic Frames	
2022	Gold	Alphonse Puthren	Malayalam	Co-Produced with Magic Frames	
2023	Selfiee	Raj Mehta	Hindi	Remake of Driving Licence, Co-Produced with Magic Frames, Dharma Productions, Cape Of Good Films	
2024	Guruvayoor Ambalanadayil	Vipin Das	Malayalam	Co-Produced with E4 Entertainment	
2025	L2: Empuraan	Prithviraj Sukumaran	Malayalam	Project Design	
2026	I, Nobody	Nisam Basheer	Malayalam	Co-Produced with E4 Entertainment	

== As playback singer ==
List of Prithviraj Sukumaran film credits as a playback singer
Year	Song	Title	Composer(s)	Language	Notes
2009	"Kaane Kaane"	Puthiya Mukham	Deepak Dev	Malayalam	Theme song
2010	"Kaattu Paranjathum"	Thanthonni	Thej Mervin	Malayalam	Not featured in the film
2010	"Kettille Kettille"	Pokkiri Raja	Jassie Gift	Malayalam	Co-sung with Vijay Yesudas, Rijiya Riyas, Anwar Sadat
2010	"Njan"	Anwar	Gopi Sundar	Malayalam	
2011	"Vadakku Vadakku"	Urumi	Deepak Dev	Malayalam	
2012	"Tarzan Antony Coming Back To Cinema"	Hero	Gopi Sundar	Malayalam	
2014	"Oru Kadha Parayunnu Lokam"	7th Day	Deepak Dev	Malayalam	
2015	"Ivide"	Ivide	Gopi Sundar	Malayalam	Theme song
2015	"Premamennaal"	Amar Akbar Anthony	Nadirshah	Malayalam	
2017	"Arikil Ini Njan Varaam"	Adam Joan	Deepak Dev	Malayalam	
2020	"Adakachakko"	Ayyappanum Koshiyum	Jakes Bejoy	Malayalam	Promo Song
2021	"Lokam – Who Wants it"	Bhramam	Joe Paul	Malayalam	
2022	"Thathaka Theithare"	Hridayam	Hesham Abdul Wahab	Malayalam	
2022	"Vannu pokum"	Bro Daddy	Deepak Dev	Malayalam	

== As lyricist ==
List of Prithviraj Sukumaran film credits as a lyricist
Year	Song	Title	Composer(s)	Language	Notes
2025	"L2E Teaser Theme"	L2: Empuraan	Deepak Dev	Malayalam	

== As voice actor ==
List of Prithviraj Sukumaran film credits as a voice actor
Year	Title	Dubbed For	Character	Language	Notes
2011	Urumi	Arya	Kothuwal of Chirakkal	Malayalam	
2023	Alone	Himself	Hari	Malayalam	

== As narrator ==
List of Prithviraj Sukumaran film credits as a narrator
Year	Title	Language	Notes
2008	Manjadikuru	Malayalam	
2015	Oru Second Class Yathra	Malayalam	
2015	Ivide	Malayalam	
2015	Kanal	Malayalam	
2022	Mohanlal	Malayalam	
2022	Ranam	Malayalam	
2022	Radhe Shyam	Malayalam	Dubbed version
2022	Jack N' Jill	Malayalam	
2022	Vendhu Thanindhathu Kaadu	Malayalam	Dubbed for trailer only
2022	Ponniyin Selvan: I	Malayalam	Dubbed for trailer only
2024	Anweshippin Kandethum	Malayalam	

== See also ==
- List of awards and nominations received by Prithviraj Sukumaran
