= List of awards and nominations received by Prithviraj Sukumaran =

Prithviraj Sukumaran awards and nominations
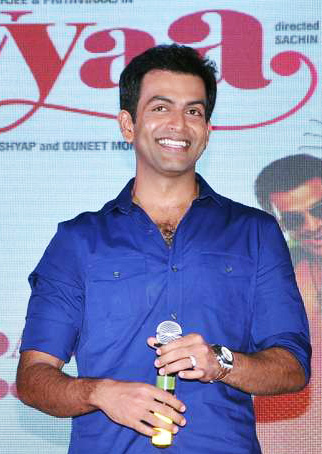
- Prithviraj in 2012
Awards & nominations
Award	Won	Nominated
Asianet Film Awards	4	5
Civilian honours	0	0
Filmfare Awards South	1	6
IBNLive Movie Awards	1	2
IIFA Utsavam	1	1
Jaihind TV Film Awards	2	2
Kerala State Film Awards	3	3
Kerala Film Critics Awards	2	2
Mathrubhumi Film Awards	9	9
National Film Awards	1	1
South Indian International Movie Awards	7	10
Surya TV Film Awards	1	1
Vanitha Film Awards	3	3
Zee Cine Awards	0	1
Other awards	4	4
- Total number of wins and nominations
Totals	31	39

This is a list of awards and nominations received by Prithviraj Sukumaran, credited mononymously as, Prithviraj, an Indian actor, playback singer and producer who predominantly works in Malayalam films. He has also acted in a number of Tamil, Telugu and Hindi films. He has acted more than 100 films.

== National Film Awards ==
- 2011 – Best Feature Film in Malayalam (Producer) for Indian Rupee

== Kerala State Film Awards ==
- 2023 – Best Actor for The Goat Life
- 2012 – Best Actor for Celluloid and Ayalum Njanum Thammil
- 2011 – Best Film (Producer) for Indian Rupee (Shared with Santhosh Sivan & Shaji Nadeshan)
- 2006 – Best Actor for Vaasthavam

== Tamil Nadu State Film Awards ==
- 2014 – Best Villain for Kaaviya Thalaivan

== Kerala Film Critics Association Awards ==
- 2020 – Best Actor for Ayyappanum Koshiyum
- 2019 – Special Jury Award (Director) for Lucifer
- 2003 – Best Actor for Meerayude Dukhavum Muthuvinte Swapnavum and Chakram

== Filmfare Awards South ==
- 2024 - Won - Best Actor (Critics) - Malayalam for Aadu Jeevitham
- 2024 - Nominated - Best Actor - Malayalam for Aadu Jeevitham
- 2014 – Nominated – Best Actor – Tamil for Kaaviya Thalaivan
- 2013 – Winner – Critics Best Actor – Malayalam for Celluloid
- 2016 – Nominated – Best Actor – Malayalam for Pavada
- 2015 – Nominated – Best Actor – Malayalam for Ennu Ninte Moideen
- 2013 – Nominated – Best Actor – Malayalam for Celluloid
- 2012 – Nominated – Best Actor – Malayalam for Ayalum Njanum Thammil
- 2011 – Nominated – Best Actor – Malayalam for Indian Rupee
- 2010 – Nominated – Best Actor – Malayalam for Anwar
- 2010 – Nominated – Best Supporting Actor – Tamil for Raavanan

== SIIMA Awards ==
- 2020 – Best Actor for Ayyappanum Koshiyum
- 2019 – Best Debutant Director for Lucifer
- 2018 – Best Actor (Critics) for Koode
- 2015 – Best Actor for Ennu Ninte Moideen
- 2014 – Best Actor (Critics) for 7th Day
- 2013 – Best Actor (Critics) for Mumbai Police
- 2011 – Best Film for Indian Rupee

== IIFA Utsavam Awards ==
- 2015 – Best Actor for Ennu Ninte Moideen

== Asianet Film Awards ==
- 2019 – Best Director for Lucifer
- 2018 – Most Popular Actor for Koode, Ranam
- 2015 – Best Actor for Ennu Ninte Moideen
- 2013 – Most Popular Actor for Memories
- 2012 – Most Popular Actor for Ayalam Njanum Thammil
- 2009 – Youth Icon of the Year
- 2005 – Special Jury

== Zee Cine Awards ==
- 2013 – Nominated – Zee Cine Award for Best Male Debut for Aiyyaa

== Asiavision Awards ==
- 2015 – Best Actor for Ennu Ninte Moideen
- 2013 – Man of the Year

== Vanitha Film Awards ==
- 2020 – Best Director for Lucifer
- 2015 – Best Actor for Ennu Ninte Moideen
- 2013 – Best Actor for Mumbai Police, Celluloid

== Other awards ==
- 2015 – CPC Cine Awards 2015 – Best Actor for Ennu Ninte Moideen
