= Tony Luke =

Indian film actor (born 1982)

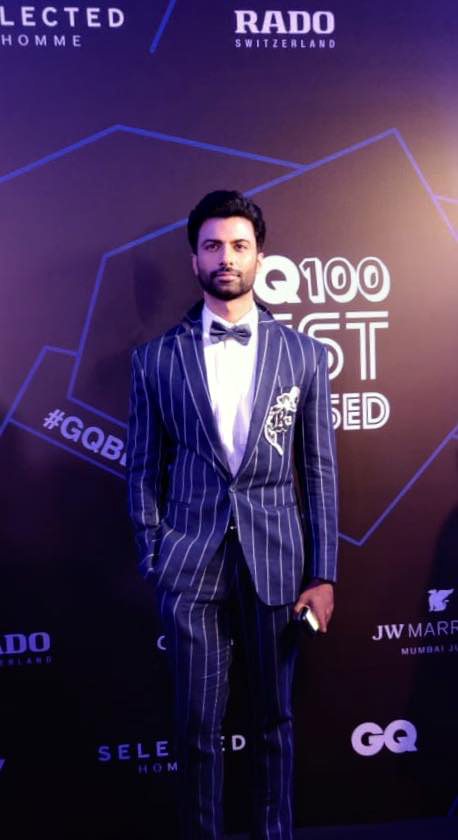
- Luke at GQ Best Dressed Awards night
- Born: 10 November 1985 (age 40); Kochi, Kerala, India
- Occupation: Actor
- Years active: 2007 – present

Tony Luke Kocherry (born 10 November 1985) is an Indian actor who predominantly appears in Malayalam films. He began his career as a fashion model and later forayed into cinema, debuting with Oozham (2016) in a negative role. In 2019, Tony made his Bollywood debut with a supporting role in the crime thriller Badla (2019), starring Amitabh Bachchan and Taapsee Pannu.

== Early life ==
Tony was born to Thresia Kocherry and Luke Kocherry on 10 November 1985, at Kochi, Kerala in India. He is an IT engineering graduate from the PES University in Bangalore and a post-graduate in International Business Administration (IBA) from Regent's Business School London. Tony attended The Choice School, Ernakulam where he was active in sports.

== Career ==
=== Modelling ===
The actor started modelling at the age of 19 in Bangalore while in college. In 2005, he debuted as an international model represented by Major Model Management in Milan, Italy.

In 2014, Tony played a minor role in an experimental short film named Karma Cartel, which went on to win awards and honors in various film festivals across the globe.

=== Film acting ===
He made his film debut in 2016 with the Malayalam film Oozham directed by Jeethu Joseph and starring Prithviraj Sukumaran in the lead. Tony's performance met with critical acclaim for his portrayal of the 25 year old character Andrew Wilfred-Marcus. After the success of Oozham, Tony played the role of the antagonist in the political thriller Sakhavu (2017) directed by Sidhartha Siva, starring Nivin Pauly in lead. Tony received positive reviews for his portrayal of the sadistic, cruel 40-year-old character of a manager who enslaves workers on the tea estates of pre-independent India.

In 2018, Luke starred in Naam, a campus story, where he played a 22-year-old. In the same year, he went on to appear as a 30-year-old computer hacker in commercial blockbuster Aadhi, directed by Jeethu Joseph, starring Pranav Mohanlal in the lead. In 2019, The actor was seen in Science Fiction Psychological thriller 9 starring Prithviraj Sukumaran and directed by Jenuse Mohammad.

On March 8, 2019, Luke made his Hindi Bollywood debut in a prominent supporting role in the crime thriller Badla directed by Sujoy Ghosh starring Amitabh Bachchan and Taapsee Pannu. The film went onto gross 100 crores in the Indian domestic Box office.

== Filmography ==
=== Films ===
Year	Title	Role	Language	Notes	Ref.
2016	Oozham	Andrew Marcus	Malayalam	Debut	
2017	Sakhavu	The Manager	Malayalam		
2018	Aadhi	Ebin	Malayalam		
2018	Naam	Aju Koshy	Malayalam		
2019	9	Sandeep Murthy	Malayalam		
2019	Badla	Arjun Joseph	Hindi	Bollywood debut	
TBA	Ram	TBA	Malayalam	Filming	

=== Web series ===
Year	Title	Role	Language	Notes
2020	Expiry Date	Vishwa	Hindi and Telugu	ZEE5 OTT
