= Prithviraj Sukumaran =

Indian actor and filmmaker (born 1982)

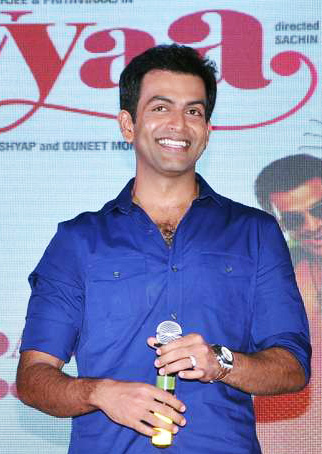
- Prithviraj in 2012
- Born: 16 October 1982 (age 44); Thiruvananthapuram, Kerala, India
- Occupations: Actor; director; producer; playback singer
- Years active: 2002–present
- Organization: Prithviraj Productions
- Works: Full list
- Spouse: Supriya Menon (m. 2011)
- Children: 1
- Parent(s): Sukumaran (father); Mallika Sukumaran (mother)
- Family: See Sukumaran family
- Awards: Full list

Prithviraj Sukumaran (/pr̩t̪ʰʋiɾaːd͡ʒ/; born 16 October 1982) is an Indian actor, producer, director, and playback singer who primarily works in Malayalam cinema. Having appeared in more than 100 films, Prithviraj is among the highest paid Malayalam actors. His accolades include a National Film Award, four Kerala State Film Awards, a Tamil Nadu State Film Award and two Filmfare Award South.

Prithviraj made his acting debut with the 2002 film Nandanam. After starring in a few box-office failures, he made a comeback with Classmates (2006), the highest-grossing Malayalam film of the year, and became the youngest recipient of Kerala State Film Award for Best Actor for Vaasthavam. He then played a musician in the Tamil romantic comedy Mozhi (2007) and ventured into playback singing with Puthiya Mugham (2009) before earning his second Kerala State Film Award for Best Actor for the medical drama Ayalum Njanum Thammil (2012) and the biographical film Celluloid (2013).

In 2010, Prithviraj became a producer and joined the production company August Cinema. He co-produced and headlined Urumi and Indian Rupee (both 2011); the latter won the National Film Award for Best Feature Film in Malayalam and Kerala State Film Award for Best Film. He won the Tamil Nadu State Film Award for Best Villain for Kaaviya Thalaivan (2014) and had further success with Ennu Ninte Moideen (2015) and Ezra (2017). After leaving August Cinema in 2017, he launched Prithviraj Productions independently that first produced 9 (2019). Prithviraj made his directorial debut with Lucifer (2019), which became one of the highest-grossing Malayalam films. He has since achieved critical and commercial success with Malayalam films Driving License (2019), Ayyappanum Koshiyum (2020), Jana Gana Mana (2022), Kaduva (2022), The Goat Life (2024) and Guruvayoor Ambalanadayil (2024) and the Telugu film Salaar (2023).

== Early life and education ==
Prithviraj Sukumaran was born on 16 October 1982 to the actors Sukumaran and Mallika Sukumaran in Thiruvananthapuram. Prithviraj hails from a well-known Nair family of south Kerala, the same family to which the famous Malayali authors Kainikkara Padmanabha Pillai and Kainikkara Kumara Pillai belonged. His maternal grandfather, Madhavan Pillai, was also a Gandhian and political activist who supported the Indian National Congress. His family was settled in Tamil Nadu at the time, where he attended Shrine Vailankanni School in T. Nagar, Chennai, and St. Joseph's Boys School, Coonoor.

When his family moved to Kerala, he attended the NSS Public School, in Perunthanni, Trivandrum. He then moved to St. Mary's Residential Central School in Poojappura where he acted in plays and skits for the school's annual day celebrations. He completed his education at Sainik School, Kazhakootam, and Bhavan's Senior Secondary School, Kodunganoor in Thiruvananthapuram.

After school, he enrolled in a bachelor's degree in Information Technology at the University of Tasmania in Australia but did not complete it. His highest level of education is higher secondary (+2) education. During this time, he auditioned for film director Ranjith and won the lead role in the film Nandanam. It was film director Fazil who introduced him to Ranjith. His elder brother, Indrajith Sukumaran, and sister-in-law, Poornima Indrajith, are also film actors.

== Career ==
=== Debut and career struggles (2002–2008) ===
In 2001, Prithviraj underwent a screen-test by director Fazil for one of his projects. Even though that project never materialised, Fazil recommended him to director Ranjith, who was planning his second directorial, Nandanam (2002), Prithviraj underwent screen-test for the role and got selected. Though Nandanam was the first film that Prithviraj acted in, it was released after Nakshathrakkannulla Rajakumaran Avanundoru Rajakumari and Stop Violence. Prithviraj then appeared in films directed by Lohithadas, Vinayan, Kamal and Bhadran. Shyamaprasad, who cast him as the lead in his film Akale, said that Prithviraj's advantages are his talent and intelligence irrespective of his box office successes.

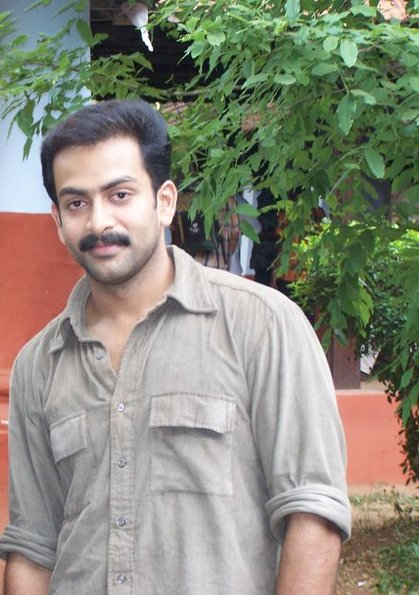
Prithviraj in 2005

In 2005, Prithviraj Sukumaran debuted in Tamil cinema through Kana Kandaen. He starred in director Santosh Sivan’s Anandabhadram, portraying a character called Anandan who is a young NRI who likes his mother’s native village, a place known for powerful wizards and go through several human emotions. In 2006, Prithviraj co-starred with actor Bhagyaraj's daughter Saranya Bhagyaraj in Parijatham. It became an acclaimed film.

In 2006, he played the role of Sub Inspector Solomon Joseph in Vargam, and then appeared in the film Vaasthavam, for which he received the Kerala State Film Award for Best Actor. He was the youngest actor to win the award. The same year he starred in Lal Jose's Classmates. The coming-of-age romantic comedy-drama was one of the biggest hits of his career. In 2007, he starred in Chocolate, directed by Shafi. In 2007, Prithviraj co-starred Jyothika in Mozhi. He also starred in Satham Podathey and Kannamoochi Yenada in the same year.

In 2008, he starred in Thalappavu, (directed by Madhupal) and Thirakkatha (directed by Ranjith), playing pivotal characters in both. One of the reviews of Thalappavu describes it as the coming-of-age film for prithviraj describing the "spartan dignity" he brought to his portrayal of the Naxalite Joseph. The Sify review of Thirakkatha describes it as a "genuine attempt that keeps the viewer engaged until the end". Both Thalappavu and Thirakkatha shared the award for the best film in the Film Critics Award for 2008. In 2008, Prithviraj starred in Vellithirai, the Tamil remake of Udayananu Tharam. Rediff described, "Prithviraj ... makes the best of his assets – his expressive eyes, which glint in fury, soften with love, or brim over with frustrated tears."

=== Established actor (2009–2012) ===
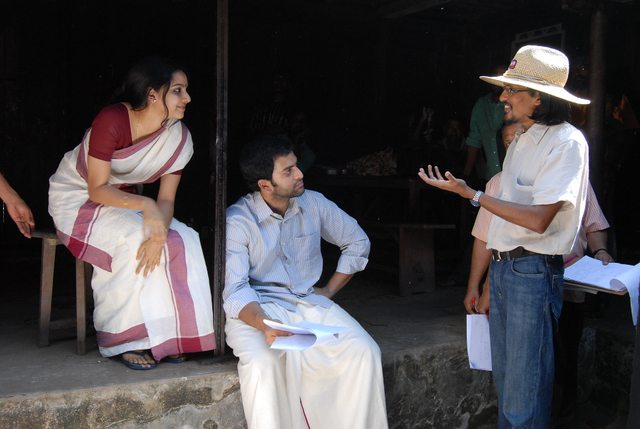
Prithviraj with co-star Samvritha Sunil and director Raj Nair during the shoot of the film Punyam Aham

In 2009, the success of Prithviraj Sukumaran's Puthiya Mugham (directed by Diphan) was a major turning point in the actor's career and led to him being branded as a superstar. His other releases in 2009 were Robin Hood (directed by Joshy) and the anthology film Kerala Cafe. In 2010, Sukumaran's notable films were Pokkiri Raja and Anwar, directed by Amal Neerad. He played the antagonist in Mani Ratnam's Raavanan in 2010 alongside actor Vikram who played the main protagonist. His performance was critically acclaimed. In the same year, Prithviraj debuted in Telugu cinema in the film Police Police.

In 2011, Prithviraj produced his first film, the multilingual Urumi. His other releases included City of God, Manikyakallu, Veettilekkulla Vazhi and Indian Rupee. Critics praised Prithviraj for his performance in Indian Rupee, a critic at Nowrunning.com, called it his "careers best performance". In 2012, his releases included Hero, Molly Aunty Rocks! and Ayalum Njanum Thammil, along with cameo roles in Aakashathinte Niram. He also made a special appearance in Anjali Menon's Manjadikuru.

In Ayalum Njanum Thammil, Prithviraj portrayed Dr. Ravi Tharakan, an irresponsible young doctor who undergoes a profound transformation under the mentorship of a senior physician. His restrained and emotionally nuanced performance received widespread critical acclaim, with several critics describing it as one of the finest performances of his career. The role earned him the Kerala State Film Award for Best Actor (shared with Celluloid).

In that same year, Prithviraj debuted in Hindi cinema through Aiyyaa, starring alongside Rani Mukerji.

=== Critical acclaim and further success (2013–2018) ===
In 2013, Prithviraj had three releases Celluloid, Mumbai Police and Memories, all of which were critical and commercial successes. He portrayed J.C. Daniel in Celluloid, for which he won his second Kerala State Film Award for Best Actor. He also played the role of a police officer in Aurangzeb, directed by Athul Sabharwal which was his second project in Hindi cinema.

In 2014, Prithviraj's first major release was London Bridge, which was a box office failure; followed by 7th Day, which emerged as a commercial success. He also featured in a cameo role in Munnariyippu. His third release of the year, Sapthamashree Thaskaraha was praised by critics. Prithviraj also starred in director Vasanthabalan's period film Kaaviya Thalaivan, co-starring Siddharth.

His first release of 2015 was Picket 43, followed by other releases such as Shyamaprasad's Ivide. Prithviraj was widely praised for his performance in the film. He next appeared in Lijo Jose Pellissery's Double Barrel.

His most successful film of that year was Ennu Ninte Moideen co starring Parvathy which narrated the tragic love tale of Kanchanamala and Moideen that happened in the 1960s in Mukkam, a riverside village in Kerala. The film opened to critical acclaim, with several critics regarding it as one of the greatest romance films made in Malayalam cinema. His role as Moideen is regarded as one of the best in his career. His next releases Amar Akbar Anthony and Anarkali were major commercial success.

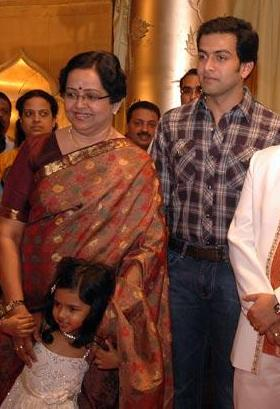
Prithviraj with his mother Mallika Sukumaran and niece Prarthana Indrajith at an event in 2009

Prithviraj had four releases in 2016, beginning with Paavada, a family drama in which he played a drunkard. It met with a positive response and was a commercial success and ran for 100 days in theatres. His other releases Darvinte Parinamam and James & Alice were met with mixed reviews, the former told the story of an ordinary man dealing with a local goon and the latter was a family drama that discussed the matter of life and death. His last release, Oozham, an action thriller directed by Jeethu Joseph was a commercial success. He played a demolition expert. In 2017, he starred in the horror film Ezra, which became one of the highest-grossing Malayalam films of the year, grossing ₹50 crore worldwide. His other releases that year included Tiyaan, Adam Joan and Vimaanam. Both Tiyaan and Vimaanam were moderate box office hits. He starred in his third Hindi film, Naam Shabana.

His first release of 2018 was Roshini Dinakar's romantic drama My Story, a commercial failure at the box office. His next two releases were Anjali Menon's drama Koode and Nirmal Sahadev's crime drama Ranam. Koode received critical acclaim and was a commercial success while Ranam was met with positive critical response but performed moderately at the box office. In 2018, Prithviraj launched his independent production house, Prithviraj Productions. In 2019, he produced and starred in the science fiction film 9. The film received was a box office success.

=== Lucifer and beyond (2019–present) ===
Prithviraj made his directorial debut in 2019 with the film Lucifer, starring Mohanlal. The film became one of the highest-grossing Malayalam film. In the following years, he would go onto star in the comedy-drama Driving License (2019), Ayyappanum Koshiyum (2020), Jana Gana Mana (2022), Kaduva (2022) and Salaar: Part 1 – Ceasefire (2023), all of which emerged as box office successes. However, Brother's Day, Kaapa, and Gold failed at the box office. In 2024, he acted in the survival drama, Aadujeevitham, directed by Blessy. Prithviraj had been cast for the project 16 years prior in 2008. Aadujeevitham was critically and commercially successful with Prithviraj earning critical acclaim for his performance. His second release, Bade Miyan Chote Miyan, marking his fourth film in Hindi cinema, received negative reviews from critics and was a box-office bomb. His third release, the comedy-drama Guruvayoor Ambalanadayil was also a commercial success. Both films ranks among the list of List of highest-grossing Malayalam films of all time. He won the Kerala State Film Award for Best Actor for Aadujeevitham that year. In 2025, he directed and starred in L2: Empuraan, a sequel to Lucifer. The film received mixed reviews from critics but still emerged as a commercial success. Prithviraj next appeared in the Hindi film Sarzameen (2025), directed by Kayoze Irani, the son of Boman Irani, and produced by Karan Johar, Apoorva Mehta, and Adar Poonawalla under Dharma Productions. It released directly onto JioHotstar to mixed-to-negative reviews. His another release in the year 2025 was Vilayath Buddha, which turned to be an underperformer.

In 2026, he will appear in the highly anticipated sequel to Salaar: Part 1 - Ceasefire, Salaar: Part 2 - Shouryanga Parvam. He has also signed on to appear in malayalam films Nobody, and Santhosh Trophy. Varanasi, directed by S. S. Rajamouli and co-starring Mahesh Babu and Priyanka Chopra is one of his most anticipated films.

== Personal life ==
Prithviraj married BBC India reporter Supriya Menon on 25 April 2011 in a private ceremony held in Palakkad. They have a daughter, born in 2014. Prithviraj and his family used to reside in Thevara, Kochi. Since 2024, he has been staying at a house bought for ₹30 crores, at Pali Hill, Mumbai.

== Other ventures ==
Prithviraj Productions is an Indian film production and distribution company based in Kochi, established in 2017 by Prithviraj and his wife Supriya Menon. Since then, it has produced and distributed over 10 films.

=== As a producer ===
Year	Film	Director	Language	Notes	Ref.
2019	9	Jenuse Mohamed	Malayalam		
2019	Driving Licence	Lal Jr.	Malayalam		
2021	Kuruthi	Manu Warrier	Malayalam		
2022	Jana Gana Mana	Dijo Jose Antony	Malayalam		
2022	Kaduva	Shaji Kailas	Malayalam		
2022	Gold	Alphonse Puthren	Malayalam		
2023	Selfiee	Raj Mehta	Hindi	Remake of Driving Licence; co-produced with Hiroo Yash Johar, Aruna Bhatia, Supriya Menon, Karan Johar, Apoorva Mehta, Listin Stephen	
2024	Guruvayoor Ambalanadayil	Vipin Das	Malayalam		

=== As a distributor ===
Year	Film	Director	Language	Notes	Ref.
2019	Petta	Karthik Subbaraj	Tamil		
2019	Bigil	Atlee	Tamil		
2021	Master	Lokesh Kanagaraj	Tamil		
2021	Doctor	Nelson Dilipkumar	Tamil		
2021	83	Kabir Khan	Hindi		
2022	KGF: Chapter 2	Prashanth Neel	Kannada	Distributed Malayalam version	
2022	777 Charlie	Kiranraj K.	Kannada	Distributed Malayalam version	
2022	Kantara	Rishab Shetty	Kannada	Distributed Malayalam version	
2022	Kumari	Nirmal Sahadev	Malayalam		
2023	Salaar: Part 1 – Ceasefire	Prashanth Neel	Telugu	Distributed Malayalam version	
2024	The Goat Life	Blessy	Malayalam		

== In the media ==
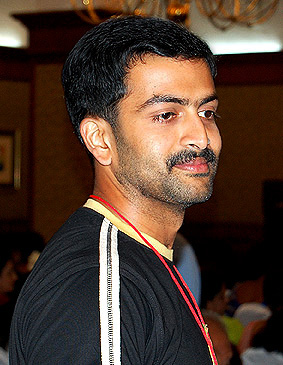
Prithviraj in 2008

Prithviraj is considered among the most popular and highest-paid actors of Malayalam cinema. He was placed fourth in 2013 and first in 2015, in Rediff.com "Best Malayalam Actor" list. His performance in Mumbai Police is regarded as one of the "100 Greatest Performances of the Decade" by Film Companion. Prithviraj was named the Kochi Times Most Desirable Men of 2017 and 2019. He was further placed 4th in 2018 and 2nd in 2020, on the same list. A research study conducted in 2023 by Indian Institute of Human Brands (IIHB) stated that Prithviraj was the third highest-ranked celebrity in Malayalam cinema. In 2024, Hindustan Times placed him in their "Top Performances of the Year" list. In 2024, Prithviraj was placed 100th on IMDb's List of 100 Most Viewed Indian Stars.

== Accolades ==
Prithviraj won the National Film Award for Best Feature Film in Malayalam for Indian Rupee. He has received four Kerala State Film Awards: Best Actor for Vaasthavam, Celluloid and Ayalum Njanum Thammil, and The Goat Life, and Best Film for Indian Rupee. He has also won the Filmfare Critics Award for Best Actor – Malayalam for Celluloid and Tamil Nadu State Film Award for Best Villain for Kaaviya Thalaivan.

== See also ==
- Forca Kochi FC
