= Manyasree Viswamithran =

- Poster
- Directed by: Madhu
- Written by: Kainikkara Kumara Pillai
- Based on: Mathruka Manushyan by Kainikkara Kumara Pillai
- Produced by: Madhu
- Starring: Madhu; Sheela; Jayabharathi; Kaviyoor Ponnamma
- Cinematography: U. Rajagopal
- Edited by: G. Venkittaraman
- Music by: Shyam
- Production company: Uma Arts
- Release date: 25 January 1974
- Country: India
- Language: Malayalam

Manyasree Viswamithran is a 1974 Indian Malayalam-language satirical film, directed and produced by Madhu, and written by Kainikkara Kumara Pillai. The film stars Madhu, Sheela, Jayabharathi and Kaviyoor Ponnamma. It is based on Kainikkara Kumara Pillai's play Mathruka Manushyan. Kamal Haasan worked as dance choreographer of this film.

== Plot ==
This film

== Cast ==
- Madhu as Marthandan Thampi
- Sheela as Kusumam
- Jayabharathi as Padmam
- Kaviyoor Ponnamma as Bhagiradhiyamma
- KPAC Lalitha as Naani
- Adoor Bhasi as Sankaran
- Sam
- Sankaradi as Vakkeel
- K. R. Suresh
- Bahadoor as Balachandran
- Kovai Rajan
- M. G. Soman as Ramesh
- Meena as Aluvalia
- Narendran
- Sudevan
- Usharani

== Soundtrack ==
The music was composed by Shyam and the lyrics were written by P. Bhaskaran.

Song	Singers
"Oru Swapnathin"	P. Susheela, Vani Jairam
"Oru Swapnathin "	P. Susheela, Vani Jairam
"Ha Sangeetha Madhura"	P.Jayachandran, ST Sasidharan, Jayalakshmi
"Kanavu Neythoru"	S. Janaki, K. P. Brahmanandan
"Kettille Kottayathoru"	P. Madhuri
"Pandoru Naalil"	P. Susheela
"Neeyoru Vasantham"	L. R. Eeswari
"Vaadiveena Poomala"	P. Madhuri
