= Raj Nair =

Indian author and filmmaker (born 1967)

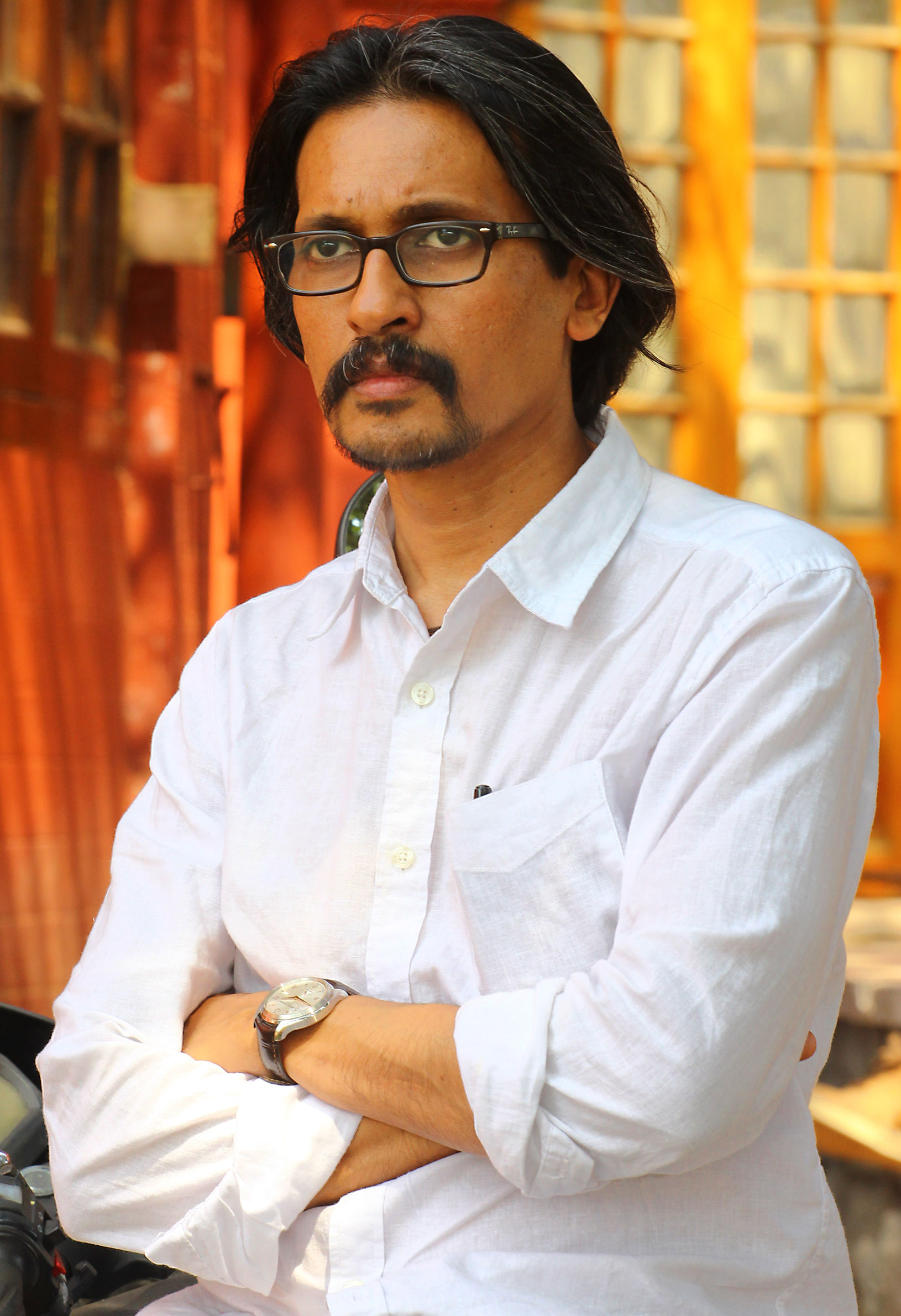
- Born: 30 May 1967 (age 59); Alappuzha, Kerala, India
- Occupations: Writer; Medical Professor; Filmmaker
- Years active: 1978–present
- Spouse: Prof. Anut Itthagarun
- Children: 2
- Relatives: Thakazhi Sivasankara Pillai (Grandfather)
- Website: http://rajnair.com/

Raj Nair (born 30 May 1967) is an Indian author and filmmaker who writes in his native language Malayalam and English.

== Biography ==
His first poem was published at the age of eleven followed by short stories and his first novel in the year 2000, Nishabdathayile Theerthadakan (Pilgrim of Silence, DC Books). He has written and directed films including, Kaazhchavasthukkal (The Exhibits, 2004) and Punyam Aham (Limpid Souls, 2010).

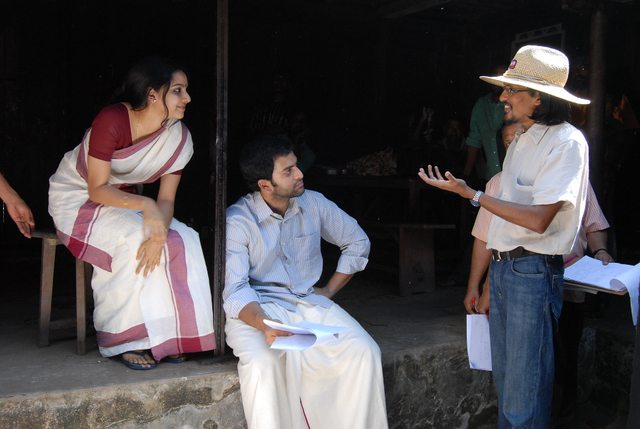
Raj Nair with Prithviraj Sukumaran and Samvrutha Sunil in the sets of Punyam Aham

== Personal life ==
Nair was born in Alappuzha and spent most of his younger years in Thakazhy and Kalarcode. He is currently a Professor of Oral Medicine in Australia. He was educated at Harvard University, University of London and holds a PhD from The University of Hong Kong. He is the grandson of acclaimed Malayalam writer, Thakazhi Sivasankara Pillai.
