= Prithviraj Productions =

Indian film production and distribution company

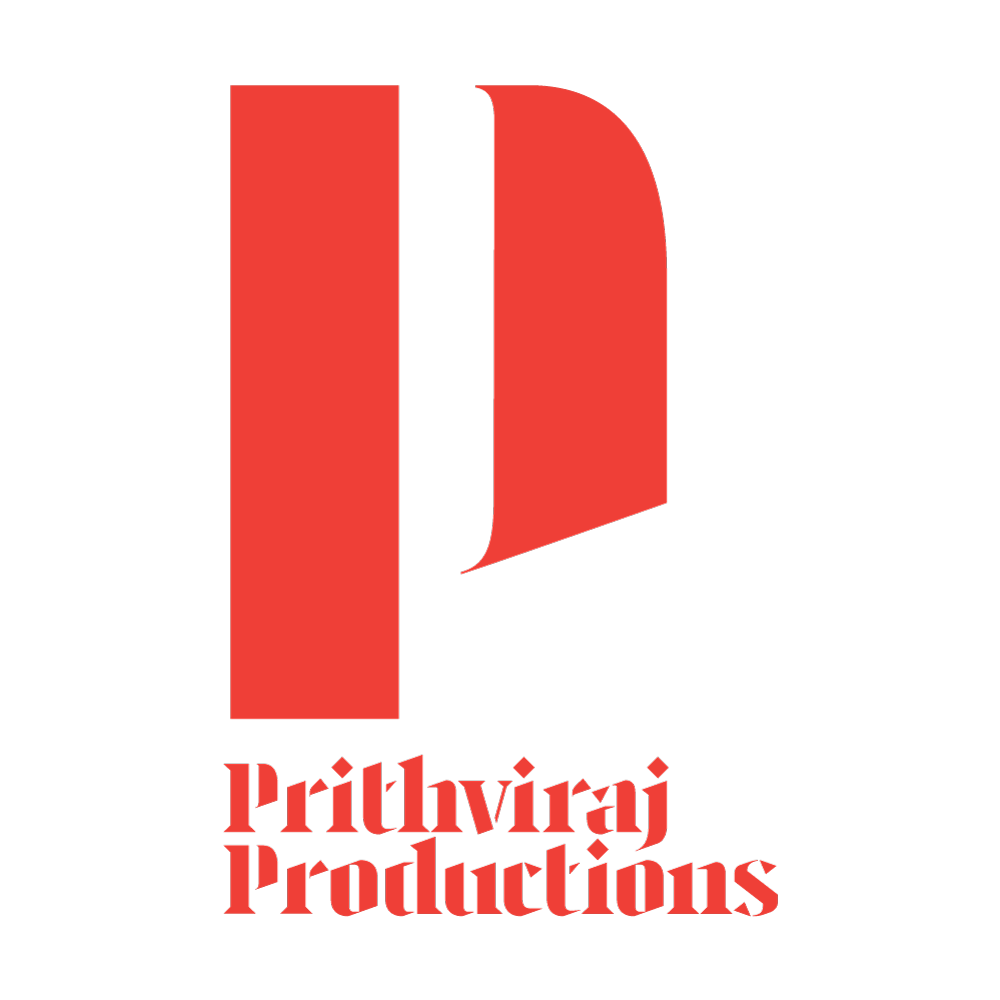
- Type: Private Limited Company
- Industry: Motion picture
- Founded: 26 July 2017; 9 years ago
- Headquarters: Kochi, Kerala, India
- Area served: India
- Products: Motion Picture
- Owner: Prithviraj Sukumaran; Supriya Menon
- Website: prithvirajproductions.com

Prithviraj Productions is an Indian film production and distribution company based in Kochi, Kerala. It was established in 2017, by actor Prithviraj Sukumaran, and his wife, Supriya Menon.

== History ==
Prithviraj Productions debuted in film production through the 2019 Malayalam film 9, directed by Jenuse Mohamed and starring Prithviraj. Major part of the filming took place in Manali and Spiti Valley. It took more than six months for the post-production. Production of the film was completed at a cost lower than the estimated budget.

Prithviraj Productions has distributed many other language films in Kerala.

Prithviraj Productions received appreciation from the Central Ministry for their prompt filing and payment of GST taxes. The company received the certificate from the Central Board of Indirect Tax, which is under the Union Ministry of Finance. This approval relates to the tax payment for the financial year 2022–23.

== Filmography ==
=== Production ===
Year	Film	Director	Language	Notes	Ref.
2019	9	Jenuse Mohamed	Malayalam	Co-Produced with SPE Films India	
2019	Driving Licence	Lal Jr.	Malayalam	Co-Produced with Magic Frames	
2021	Kuruthi	Manu Warrier	Malayalam		
2022	Bro Daddy	Prithviraj Sukumaran	Malayalam	Project Design	
2022	Jana Gana Mana	Dijo Jose Antony	Malayalam	Co-Produced with Magic Frames	
2022	Kaduva	Shaji Kailas	Malayalam	Co-Produced with Magic Frames	
2022	Gold	Alphonse Puthren	Malayalam	Co-Produced with Magic Frames	
2023	Selfiee	Raj Mehta	Hindi	Remake of Driving Licence, Co-Produced with Magic Frames, Dharma Productions, Cape Of Good Films	
2024	Guruvayoor Ambalanadayil	Vipin Das	Malayalam	Co-Produced with E4 Entertainment	
2025	L2: Empuraan	Prithviraj Sukumaran	Malayalam	Project Design	
2026	I, Nobody	Nisam Basheer	Malayalam	Co-Produced with E4 Entertainment	

=== Distribution ===
Year	Film	Director	Language	Notes	Ref.
2019	Petta	Karthik Subbaraj	Tamil		
2019	Bigil	Atlee	Tamil		
2021	Master	Lokesh Kanagaraj	Tamil		
2021	Doctor	Nelson Dilipkumar	Tamil		
2021	83	Kabir Khan	Hindi		
2022	KGF: Chapter 2	Prashanth Neel	Kannada	Distributed the dubbed Malayalam version only	
2022	777 Charlie	Kiranraj K	Kannada	Distributed the dubbed Malayalam version only	
2022	Kantara	Rishab Shetty	Kannada	Distributed the dubbed Malayalam version only	
2022	Kumari	Nirmal Sahadev	Malayalam		
2023	Salaar: Part 1 – Ceasefire	Prashanth Neel	Telugu	Distributed the dubbed Malayalam version only	
2024	The Goat Life	Blessy	Malayalam		
2025	Mahavatar Narsimha	Ashwin Kumar	Hindi, Kannada, Tamil, Malayalam,Telugu	Animated film	
2025	Kantara: Chapter 1	Rishab Shetty	Kannada	Distributed the dubbed Malayalam version only	
