= Samvrutha Sunil =

Indian actress

Samvritha Sunil
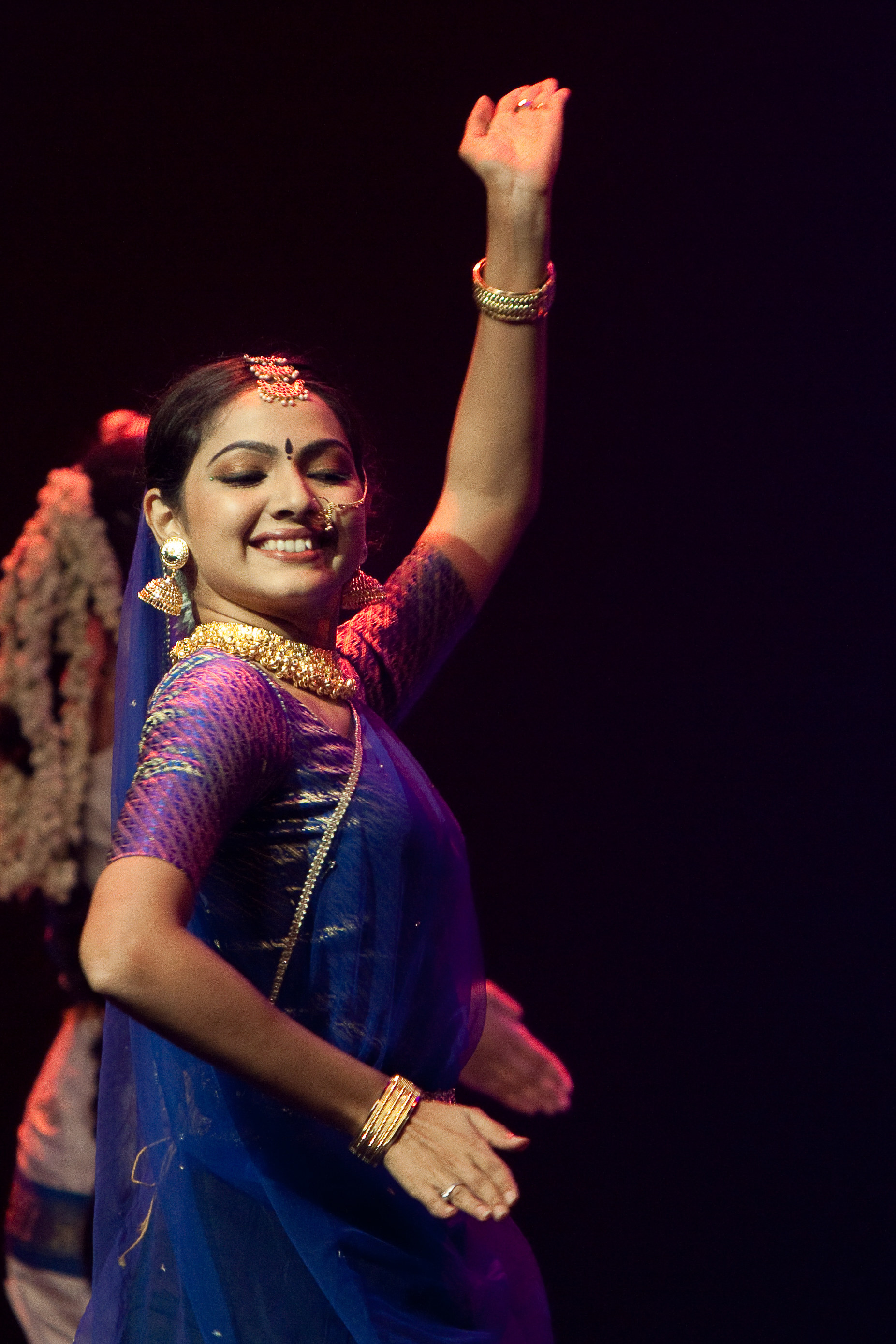
- Samvritha during a dance performance
- Born: 31 October 1986 (age 40); Kannur, Kerala, India
- Occupation: Actress
- Years active: 2004–2012; 2019-2021
- Height: 169 cm (5 ft 7 in)
- Spouse: Akhil Jayaraj (m. 2012)
- Children: Rudra, Agasthya

Samvritha Sunil (born 31 October 1986) is an Indian actress who appears mainly in Malayalam films. She made her debut in 2004 through the film Rasikan directed by Lal Jose.

Her best known films include Arabikkatha (2007), Chocolate (2007), Thirakkatha (2008), Boomi Malayalam (2009), Cocktail (2010), Manikyakkallu (2011), Swapna Sanchari (2011), Arike (2012), Diamond Necklace (2012) and Ayalum Njanum Thammil (2012). After a hiatus of 6 years, she made her comeback through the 2018 television show Nayika Nayakan.

== Early and personal life ==
Samvritha was born on 31 October 1986 to Sunil Kumar and Sadhana at Chalad, Kannur. She has a younger sister, Sanjuktha Sunil, who did the sound recording of the film Spanish Masala.

Samvritha was educated at St. Teresa's Anglo-Indian School in Kannur. Later, she graduated in Communicative English from St. Teresa's College, Kochi, and did her master's degree in Advertising from Annamalai University.

Samvritha married US-based engineer Akhil Jayaraj on 1 November 2012 at Kannur. They have two sons, Agastya and Rudra.

== Career ==
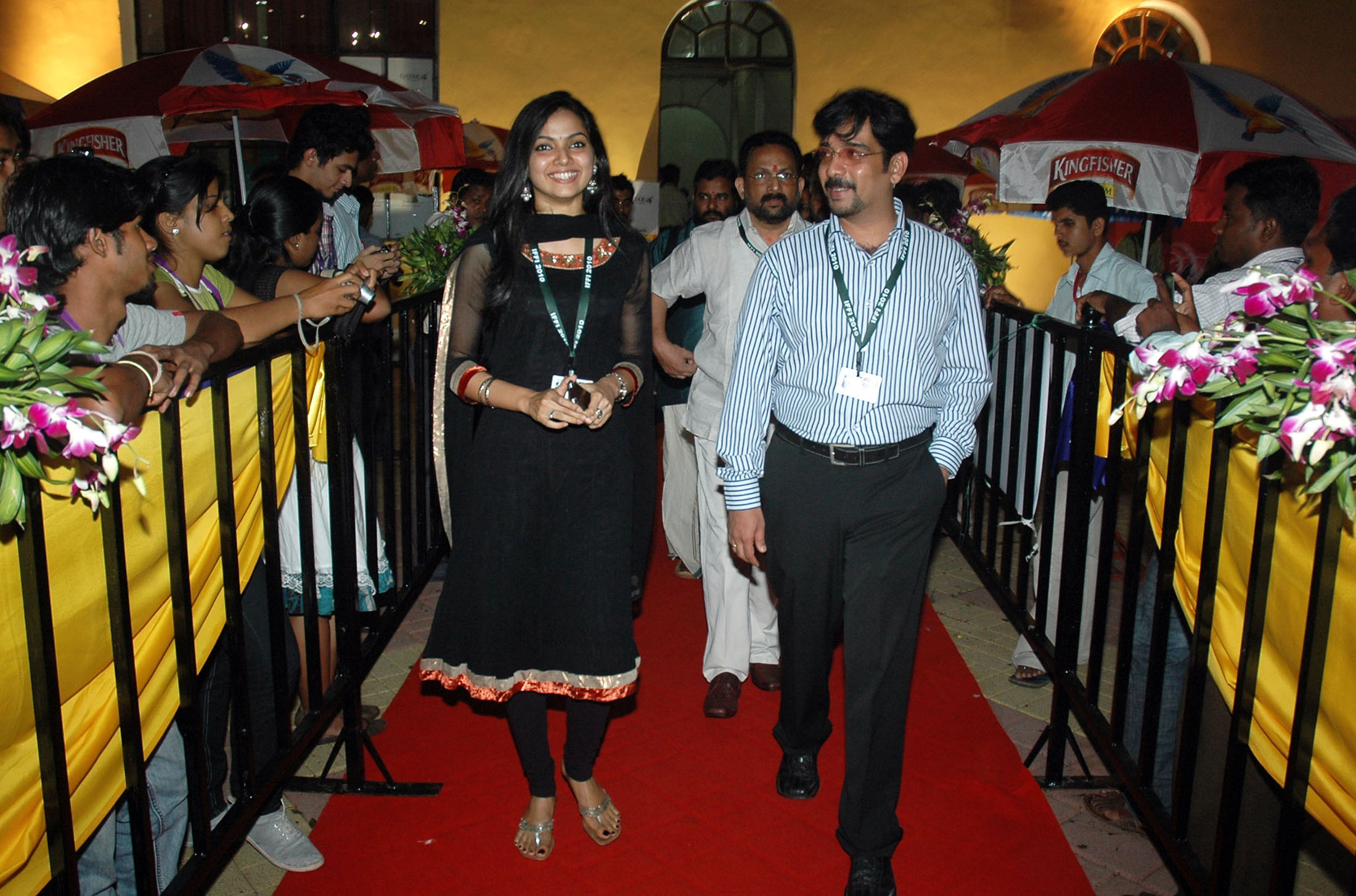
Samvritha and Vineeth arriving at 'INOX' for the movie Kaalchilambu, at the 41st International Film Festival of India (IFFI-2010), at Panaji, Goa on 25 November 2010.

Samvritha's entry into the film industry happened with Rasikan (2004) with Dileep in the lead. The film was directed by Lal Jose. Samvritha was later associated in three more films with Lal Jose. After Rasikan, she acted in films like Chandrolsavam (2005) and Nerariyan CBI (2005). Both the films were directed by veterans and had ensemble casts led by Mohanlal and Mammootty, respectively. It was her character Sherly in Lal Jose's Achanurangatha Veedu (2005). Her characters in Moonnamathoral (2006), Pothan Vava (2006) and Vaasthavam (2006) were memorable. Later, she starred in many films including Arabikkatha (2007), Chocolate (2007), Minnaminnikoottam (2008), and Thirakkatha (2008). She appeared in a guest role in Priyanandanan's national award-winning film Pulijanmam (2006) and Rafi Mecartin's Hallo (2007).

The actress also made her Tamil debut in Uyir, where she played the heroine opposite Srikanth. Her debut Telugu movie was Evadithe Nakenti (2007), a remake of Malayalayam film Lion. She also acted in Diamond Necklace in which she acted along with Fahadh Faasil, directed by Lal Jose. She also appeared in Mallu Singh co-starring Unni Mukundan and Kunchacko Boban. She was part of movies like Mallu Singh and The King and The Commissioner in 2012 and was selected as Top Star (Female) 2012 in Malayalam.

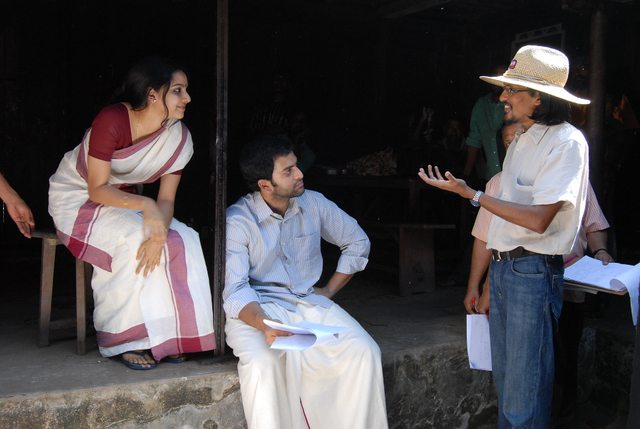
Samvritha with co-star Prithviraj and director Raj Nair during the shoot of the film Punyam Aham

In 2018, she made her comeback through the television show Nayika Nayakan on Mazhavil Manorama. The same year her film Kaalchilambu was released after delaying it for ten years. She had also acted in a Hindi film The White Elephant which failed to see theatrical release.in 2026 she is going to act an upcoming movie with dileesh pothan

== Filmography ==
Year	Film	Role	Notes
2004	Rasikan	Parvathy/Thanki	Debut film in Lead role Nominated – Filmfare Award for Best Actress – Malayalam
2005	Chandrolsavam	Malavika	
2005	Nerariyan CBI	Mythili	
2006	Achanurangatha Veedu	Sherly	Nominated – Filmfare Award for Best Supporting Actress – Malayalam
2006	Pulijanmam	Anila	
2006	Nottam	Gowri	
2006	Uyir	Anandhi	Tamil Debut
2006	Moonnamathoral	Anupama	Nominated – Filmfare Award for Best Supporting Actress – Malayalam
2006	Pothan Vava	Gayathri	
2006	Vaasthavam	Surabhi	Nominated – Filmfare Award for Best Supporting Actress – Malayalam
2007	Janmam	Devarayar's sister	
2007	Evadaithe Naakenti	Priya	Telugu Debut
2007	Arabikkatha	Maya	
2007	Hallo	Priya	Extended Cameo appearance
2007	Chocolate	Nandana	
2007	Anchil Oral Arjunan	Dr Saraswathi	
2007	Romeoo	Leena	Nominated – Filmfare Award for Best Supporting Actress – Malayalam
2008	Minnaminnikoottam	Mumthas	Asianet Film Awards for Best Supporting Actress
2008	Thirakkatha	Devayani	Nominated – Filmfare Award for Best Supporting Actress – Malayalam
2009	Bhagyadevatha	Selin	Extended Cameo appearance
2009	Boomi Malayalam	Nirmala	
2009	Ivar Vivahitharayal	Treesa	Nominated – Filmfare Award for Best Supporting Actress – Malayalam
2009	Rahasya Police	Maya	
2009	Anamika	Rachel	Nominated – Filmfare Award for Best Actress – Malayalam
2009	Vairam	Annie Jacob	
2009	Robinhood	Abhirami	
2009	Neelathaamara	Retnam	Nominated – Filmfare Award for Best Supporting Actress – Malayalam
2009	Gulumaal: The Escape	Herself	Cameo appearance
2010	Happy Husbands	Shreya	
2010	Sufi Paranja Katha	Young woman in Jaram	Cameo appearance
2010	Chekavar	Jyothi	
2010	Punyam Aham	Jayasree	
2010	Cocktail	Parvathy	Nominated – Filmfare Award for Best Actress – Malayalam
2011	Manikiakkallu	Chandni	
2011	Three Kings	Anju	
2011	Swapna Sanchari	Rashmi	Nominated – Filmfare Award for Best Actress – Malayalam
2012	Asuravithu	Marty	
2012	The King & the Commissioner	Nandha	
2012	Mallu Singh	Ashwathy	
2012	Diamond Necklace	Maya	Nominated—SIIMA Award for Best Actress in a Supporting Role; Nominated – Filmfare Award for Best Supporting Actress – Malayalam
2012	Arike	Kalpana	
2012	Gramam	Thulasi	Made in Tamil as Namma Gramam (Bilingual) - 2014
2012	Ayalum Njanum Thammil	Sainu	
2012	101 Weddings	Abhirami	
2012	White Elephant	Damini	
2019	Sathyam Paranja Viswasikkuvo	Geetha	
2021	Kaalchilambu	Karthika Thamburatty	Released in 2021; Shot in 2008
2027	Untitled Saheed Arafath film †	TBA	

== Television ==
Year	Show	Role	Channel	Notes
2012	Ningalkkum Aakaam Kodeeshwaran	Contestant	Asianet	Reality show
2018	Nayika Nayakan	Judge	Mazhavil Manorama	Reality show
2022	Top Singer Season 2	Judge	Flowers TV	Reality show
2024	Musical Wife	Judge	Flowers TV	Reality show
