= Adiga =

Adiga is a Tulu surname from coastal Karnataka in India. It is found among Hindus of the Shivalli Brahmin community.

Notable people with the surname include:

- Aravind Adiga, author of the book White Tiger, winner of the Man Booker Prize in 2008
- Gopalakrishna Adiga, pioneer of Navya-style poetry
- K. Suryanarayana Adiga, Indian lawyer and politician
- Rakesh Adiga, Indian film actor

== See also ==
- Adyghe (disambiguation), sometimes spelled Adighe, alternate name for the Circassian people originally from the North Caucasus area in Russia
