= Naam (2018 film) =

- Theatrical release poster
- Directed by: Joshy Thomas Pallickal
- Story by: Joshy Thomas Pallickal
- Produced by: Prema Antony Thekkek & Joshy Thomas Pallickal
- Starring: Shabareesh Varma; Rahul Madhav; Saiju Kurup; Tony Luke; Renji Panicker; Antony Thekkek; Aditi Ravi; Noby Marcose; Gayathri Suresh
- Cinematography: Sudhi Surendran; Karthick Nallamuthu
- Edited by: Antony Nikhil Varghese
- Music by: Ashwin Sivadas; Sandeep Mohan
- Production company: JTP Films
- Release date: 11 May 2018
- Country: India
- Language: Malayalam

Naam (English: Us) is a 2018 Indian Malayalam-language drama film written, directed and produced by debutant Joshy Thomas Pallickal. It tells the story of a group of youngsters.

== Cast ==
- Rahul Madhav as Anil Kumar
- Shabareesh Varma as Harris Muhammed
- Noby Marcose as Kunjacko
- Tony Luke as Aju Koshy
- Renji Panicker as Fr. James Kottayil
- Antony Thekkek as Fr. Mathew Plavanakkuzhy
- Saiju Kurup as Masthan Sebatian
- Gayathri Suresh as Anna Philip
- Aditi Ravi as Neha John
- Mareena Michael Kurisingal as Maya
- Ponnamma Babu as Molly John
- Abhishek Raveendran as Murali Krishnan
- Dinesh Prabhakar as Suresh (Uncle of Murali)
- Hima Sankar
- Ajay Mathew as Shyam Sreedharan
- Hakim Shahjahan as Manu Alexander
- Jino John
- Abhay Warrier
- Nandu as John (Father of Neha)
- Vinod Bose as Koshi
- Sonu Sebastian as Sonu
- Jayasheelan as Susheelan
- Krishnachandran as Sreedharan Warrier (Father of Shyam)
- Naseer Sankranthi as Room boy, Bennychan
- Pradeep Kottayam as Saneesh Pinto
- Molly Kannamaly as Madonna
- Ullas Pandalam as Supran
- Bineesh Raj as Suni
- Shaijo Adimaly as College Student, Shaijo
- Josekutty Madathil as Jose
- Madan Mohan as Martin
- Niranj Suresh as Sanju
- Deepa Esther as Jesin Jolly
- Thomas J. Pallickal as Askar
- Nowbi Basheer as Anoop
- Vicky George as Luise
- Mojin Thinavilayil as Mojin
- Rokiya Adam as Nasriya Muhammed (Sister of Harris)
- Nizhalgal Ravi as Ramakrishnan (Father of Anil)
- Ramu as Mohammed (Father of Harris and Nasriya) (cameo appearance)
- Gautham Vasudev Menon as himself (cameo appearance)
- Tovino Thomas as himself (cameo appearance)
- Vineeth Sreenivasan as himself (cameo appearance)

== Production ==
Principal photography commenced in February 2017 at Mundakayam. The other locations were Kuttikkanam and Ponkunnam and Saintgits College of Engineering.

== Music ==
The music and background score for the film is composed by Ashwin and Sandeep. The audio launch was held in Kochi on 11 November. All lyrics are written by Shabareesh Varma except where noted; all music is composed by Ashwin Sivadas, Sandeep Mohan.

No.	Title	Lyrics	Artist(s)	Length
1.	"Alakalay Uyarunna"		Haricharan
2.	"Hoori"		Vijay Yesudas, Haricharan
3.	"Tunk Takkara"		Shabareesh Varma, Niranj Suresh, Suraj Santhosh, Suchith Sureshan
4.	"Getout"		Shabareesh Varma, Niranj Suresh, Suraj Santhosh, Suchith Sureshan
5.	"Adichu Polichu"		Shabareesh Varma, Niranj Suresh, Suraj Santhosh, Suchith Sureshan
6.	"Thudi Kottunne"		Niranj Suresh
7.	"Azhakin Chennai"	Mohan Raj	Niranj Suresh

== Release ==
The film was released on 11 May 2018.

The Times of India rated the film 3 out of 5 stars, commenting "Naam is not devoid of flaws but it has sincerity written all over it, and might even leave some of you choked, through its touching plot. Give it a shot if movies with a heavy dose of friendship can entertain you".
