= Jeniffer Piccinato =

Brazilian actress and model in India

- Born: Jeniffer Christine Piccinato; 17 October 1996 (age 29); Maringá, Brazil
- Education: The Barrow Group
- Occupations: Actress; model
- Years active: 2017–present
- Modelling information
- Height: 5 ft 7 in (1.70 m)
- Hair colour: Black
- Eye colour: Brown
- Agency: Inega

Jeniffer Christine Piccinato is a Brazilian actress and model based in India. She is known for her works in the Indian Hindi cinema, Telugu cinema, television, and theater.

== Early life and education ==
Piccinato was born on 17 October 1996 in Maringá, Brazil. Her father is Roque Piccinato, and her brother is Jonathan Piccinato. She studied fashion design at Centro Universitário Cesumar, Brazil and acting at The Barrow Group acting school, and The Jeff Goldberg Studio Mumbai, India. She performed in play's such as "Odd Couple" a Neil Simon adaptation, and "3 Sisters" a Chekhov's play adaptation.

== Career ==
Jeniffer Piccinato appeared in international television commercials, modeled for fashion campaigns, and music videos. She made her acting debut with the Bollywood film Baazaar (2018). She played the protagonist's role Nina in Aha entertainment's Telugu series Sin (2020) in Aha entertainment and a supporting role Monica in Zee5's hindi series Expiry Date (2022).

== Filmography ==
=== Films ===
Year	Title	Role	Language	Notes	Ref.
2018	Baazaar	Business woman	Hindi		
2021	Bathuku Busstand	Item song performer	Telugu	Song "Bussa Bussa"	
2022	Ram Setu	Dr. Gabrielle	Hindi		
2022	Thai Massage	Thai Massage Card Girl	Hindi		
2022	Freddy	Ava Unwalla	Hindi		
2023	Kennedy	Mrs. Lokhandwala	Hindi		
2024	Jahangir National University	Nyra	Hindi		
2024	Bloody Ishq	Kimaya Tandon	Hindi		
2024	Tikdam	Rose	Hindi		
2024	The Miranda Brothers	Isabella	Hindi		
2024	Zebra	Sheela "Snake" Chawla	Telugu		
2025	Romeo S3	Monica	Hindi	credited as Jeniffer Christine Piccinato	

=== Television ===
Year	Title	Role	Network	Language	Ref.
2020	Sin	Nina	Aha	Telugu	
2020	Expiry Date	Monica	ZEE5	Hindi, Telugu	
2023	United Kacche	Kim	ZEE5	Hindi	
2023	Lust Stories 2	Nisha	Netflix	Hindi	
2023	The Freelancer	Miriam	Disney+ Hotstar	Hindi	

=== Music videos ===
Year	Song	Singer(s)	Ref.
2017	"Saareyan Nu Chaddeya"	Adhyayan Suman	
2018	"Dill Ton Blacck"	Jassie Gill, Badshah	
2019	"Hona Chaida"	Arjun Kanungo	
2020	"Main Dooba Rahoon"	Aditya Narayan	
2022	"Shaidayee"	Terence Lewis	
2023	"Tera Nasha"	Aditi Singh Sharma, Yug Bhusal	
