= Expiry Date (miniseries) =

- Promotional Poster
- Written by: Shankar K Marthand
- Directed by: Shankar K Marthand
- Starring: Tony Luke; Sneha Ullal; Madhu Shalini; Ali Reza
- Country of origin: India
- Original languages: Hindi, Telugu
- No. of seasons: 1
- No. of episodes: 10

Production
- Producer: Sharrath Marar
- Running time: Approx 30 mins

Original release
- Network: ZEE5
- Release: 2 October 2020

Expiry Date is an Indian thriller drama web series written and directed by Shankar K Marthand, and produced by Sharrath Marar. The ensemble cast includes Tony Luke, Sneha Ullal, Madhu Shalini and Ali Reza. Shot simultaneously in Telugu and Hindi languages, it premiered on 2 October 2020 on ZEE5. The series portrays a man and a woman entangled in a thriller-drama due to the extra marital affair between their respective spouses.

== Plot ==
The series revolves around Vishwa and Sunitha, who get entangled in two separate police cases due to an extramarital affair between their spouses.

== Cast ==
- Tony Luke as Vishwa
- Sneha Ullal as Disha
- Madhu Shalini as Sunita
- Ali Reza as Sunny
- Jeniffer Piccinato as Monica
- Bharath Reddy

== Reception ==
Koimoi rated the series 3 out of 5 stars and wrote, "web series that primarily caters to the masses who like their entertainment to be fast-paced with ample masala in there, Expiry Date makes for a racy watch".
