= Oozham =

- Theatrical release poster
- Directed by: Jeethu Joseph
- Written by: Jeethu Joseph
- Produced by: G. George; Anto Padinjarekkara
- Starring: Prithviraj Sukumaran; Balachandra Menon; Neeraj Madhav; Pasupathy; Jayaprakash; Divya Pillai
- Cinematography: Shamdat Sainudeen
- Edited by: Ayoob Khan
- Music by: Anil Johnson
- Production company: Fine Tune Pictures
- Distributed by: Central Pictures Release & Tricolor Entertainment
- Release date: 8 September 2016
- Running time: 139 minutes
- Country: India
- Language: Malayalam
- Box office: ₹ 15.25 crores

Oozham : It's Just A Matter Of Time (transl. Turn : It's Just A Matter Of Time) is a 2016 Indian Malayalam-language action thriller film written and directed by Jeethu Joseph. The film stars Prithviraj Sukumaran, Balachandra Menon, Pasupathy, Neeraj Madhav, Jayaprakash, and Divya Pillai. Shamdat Sainudheen handled the cinematography. The film revolves around a demolition expert who teams up with his fiancée and brother to avenge the deaths of their family members from the corrupt scientist who got them killed.

The film released on 8 September 2016. This film was remade in Marathi as Grey starring Vaibhav Tattvawadi in the lead role.

== Plot ==
Kovai Krishnamoorthy is an honest health inspector in Tamil Nadu, whose son Surya works as a demolition expert in the US. One day while in a video chat with his sister Aishwarya, Surya witness some goons entering his house and murdering his whole family, leaving him devastated. On the same day, Surya's girlfriend Gayathri's brother SP Parthasarathy is also killed. Surya, along with his adopted brother Ajmal, an ex-software engineer and Gayathri set out to find the reason behind the killings. Ajmal remembers that Krishnamoorthy has stored something in his email account which would lead them to deduce about the killings.

They checks the mail and learns that Krishnamoorthy and Parthasarathy were investigating about an epidemic outbreak in Tamil Nadu where they learn that Wilfred Marcus, the owner of a pharmaceutical company called Alpha Remedies is the mastermind behind Krishnamoorthy's and Parathasarthy's deaths as they were about to expose his involvement in spreading the outbreak and providing medicines for profits. After learning this, Surya, Ajmal and Gayathri heads to the Commissioner office to expose Marcus, but they learn that the ACP N. Venkatachalapathy is actually Marcus's henchman and was also there as one of the goons on the day when Surya's family was killed.

The trio begins to trail them where they kills Venkatachalapathy in his residence using a bomb implanted on his TV then kills the company's general manager Karthikeyan at his office in a similar way . Marcus realizes that someone is tailing them and decide to hire "Captain" Anand Chathuranga, an ex-bomb squadron of the Sri Lankan Army who is now a freelancer and an explosive expert to protect them. Gayathri pretends to befriend Marcus's younger son Andrew and manages to kill him by using the same explosive implanted as a phone. After checking the details of the persons who were eliminated by Marcus, they concludes that Surya is behind all this. Anand, Marcus and his elder son Edward heads to leave for Australia, but Surya manages to bomb Edward's car with a magnetic bomb, thus killing him.

Meanwhile, SP Mohammed Riyas is appointed to investigate the killings, where he learns about Krishnamoorthy and Parthasarathy's murder has a connection with Marcus and deduce that Surya is the killer and tries to arrest him, but Surya manages to warn him to not interfere in his way. Anand and Marcus announces a reward of ₹10 million to find Surya, where a doctor gives away Ajmal's and Gayathri's location to Marcus, while Anand tails Surya at his hideout in Coimbatore and manages to capture him. The trio are strapped with Surya's own Remote Controlled bomb where Marcus and team heads some distance to see them die and triggers the bomb. The bomb doesn't explode but moments later its Remote control explodes killing Anand, Marcus and his henchmen. Surya and others leave, thus avenging their injustice.

== Cast ==
- Prithviraj Sukumaran as Surya Krishnamoorthy
- Balachandra Menon as Kovai Krishnamoorthy
- Neeraj Madhav as Ajmal, Krishnamoorthy's adopted son
- Pasupathy as Captain Anand Chathuranga, ex-bomb squadron, Sri Lankan Army
- Kishor Satya as SP Parthasarathy IPS
- Divya Pillai as Gayathri
- Jayaprakash as Wilfred Marcus
- Rasna Pavithran as Aishwarya Krishnamoorthy
- Anson Paul as Edward Marcus
- Tony Luke as Andrew Marcus
- Seetha as Subulakshmi Krishnamoorthy
- Irshad as SP Mohammed Riyas IPS
- Dinesh Prabhakar as Selvam
- Anand as Karthikeyan

== Production ==
After completing Life of Josutty, director Jeethu Joseph announced his next film entitled Oozham which features Prithviraj Sukumaran in the lead. The film marks the second collaboration of Jeethu and Prithviraj who had worked earlier in the 2013 crime thriller film Memories. The title "Oozham" is designed as a spider caught in a web, symbolizing the entrapment of victims according to the basic story.

== Release ==
The film released on 8 September 2016 in 97 screens in Kerala.

=== Box office ===
The film collected ₹1.25 crore in the opening day from Kerala box office. The first 4 days weekend collection is estimated at ₹4.45 crore. The film grossed ₹15.25 crore in 25 days run from Kerala box office.
