= Vaasthavam =

2006 film directed by M.Padmakumar

- Directed by: M. Padmakumar
- Written by: Babu Janardhanan
- Starring: Prithviraj Sukumaran; Kavya Madhavan; Samvrutha Sunil; Murali; Jagathi Sreekumar; Sindhu Menon
- Cinematography: Manoj Pillai
- Edited by: L. Bhoominathan
- Music by: Songs: Alex Paul; Background Score: C. Rajamani
- Production company: Shrichakra Films Private Ltd
- Distributed by: Shrichakra Films Release
- Release date: 10 November 2006
- Running time: 155 minutes
- Country: India
- Language: Malayalam

Vaasthavam (transl. Fact) is a 2006 Indian Malayalam-language romantic political thriller film written by Babu Janardhanan and directed by M. Padmakumar. The film revolves around a youth, Balachandran Adiga (Prithviraj Sukumaran), and follows his rise and fall in politics. The story is loosely based on Thakazhi Sivasankara Pillai's novel Enippadikal.

Prithviraj won the Kerala State Film Award for Best Actor for his performance, making him the youngest recipient of the award at age 24.

== Plot ==
Raghavan Master, a scion of a high Adiga Brahmin family and an ardent communist, is now in crisis as his tharavadu is devoid of the fame and fortune it once had. Balachandran, his only son, has the burden of looking after the family and his four sisters. He is aware of the difficulties in bringing the family back from the brink of nothingness and marrying off his sisters.

Balachandran's eldest sister, Shobha, does some tailoring and manages a low earning with which the family is kept out of hunger. Balachandran is engaged to Sumithra, his cousin. But in the turn of events, Thripran Namboodhiri comes with an offer to marry his niece to Balachandran, agreeing to ensure that he secures a job in the Secretariat as his name is in the rank list which would expire soon and thereby save his family from dire straits. Sumithra forces Balachandran to give up their dreams for the sake of his family.

He marries Surabhi, a girl from a rich family, to tackle the serious economic adversities his family faces. Notwithstanding the family chaos, Balachandran's younger sister, Shubha, walks out with an Adivasi leader, Sreedharan, on the day of Balachandran's marriage. This causes irreparable damage to the family's reputation, following which his mother dies. Sumithra marries a cruel and corrupt police officer who constantly doubts his wife's character.

At this juncture, Balachandran joins the job at the Secretariat. He lives with seventy-year-old Unnithan Asan who acts as his guide all through the corruption-filled secretariat. His financial needs force him to become a corrupt officer always on the lookout for money and power. He deliberately pretends to be a bachelor, to encourage the affections of Vimala, a divorcee and his colleague. With the help of Vimala, the niece of the new revenue minister Pattam Raveendran, Balachandran is posted to the minister's personal staff and quickly climbs the ladder of bureaucracy. What follows next is a series of events that turn Balachandran's mind so as to tear off his new life and go back to his native place to lead a simple, peaceful life with Surabhi and his family.

== Cast ==
- Prithviraj Sukumaran as Balachandran Adiga
- Kavya Madhavan as Sumithra
- Samvrutha Sunil as Surabhi Balachandran Adiga
- Murali as Pattam Raveendran
- Jagathi Sreekumar as Unnithan Ashan
- Salim Kumar as Thrippan Namboodiri
- Sindhu Menon as Vimala
- Usha as Shuba
- Sadiq as C.K. Nair
- Sudheer Karamana as Pambu Vasu
- Madhupal as Varghese
- Jagadish as Shibhu Vattappara
- Rajmohan Unnithan as Chief Minister
- KPAC Saji
- V. K. Sreeraman as Raghavan Master
- Dinesh Prabhakar as Uthaman
- Joju George as Basheer
- Meghanathan as Sasidharan Pillai
- T.G. Ravi as Gopinathan Unnithan
- Vijayan Karanthoor as Thomas
- T. P. Madhavan as Govindan Namboodiri
- Manka Mahesh as Balachandran's mother
- Seema G. Nair as Shobha
- Shaalin Zoya as Jr. Sumithra
- Varada as Balachandran's sister

== Soundtrack ==
The movie features an acclaimed soundtrack composed by Alex Paul and lyrics penned by Vayalar Sarathchandravarma.

Track #	Song	Artist(s)	Raga
1	"Ara Pavan"	Vidhu Prathap, Rimi Tomy	Dharmavati
2	"Kadam Konda"	Vidyadharan	Sindhu Bhairavi
3	"Nadha Ne Varumbol"	K. S. Chithra	Shahana
4	"Nindathi Chanthana"	Traditional	

== Reception ==
The movie received positive reviews from critics.

=== Awards ===
Kerala State Film Awards

- Kerala State Film Award for Best Actor – Prithviraj Sukumaran
- Kerala State Film Award for Best Editor – L. Bhoominathan
