= Jenuse Mohamed =

Filmmaker and writer

- Born: 4 February 1984 (age 42); Kerala, India
- Occupations: Film maker; director; screenwriter
- Years active: 2015–present

Jenuse Mohamed (born 4 February 1984) is an Indian filmmaker and writer, known for his work in Malayalam cinema. He made his directorial debut with 100 Days of Love starring Dulquer Salmaan and Nithya Menen. The film was a commercial success and was dubbed into Tamil, Telugu and Hindi. His next venture, 9, starring Prithviraj Sukumaran and Wamiqa Gabbi, was the first South Indian film to be produced by Sony Pictures.

== Early life ==
Jenuse Mohamed was born on 4 February 1984. His father Kamal is a veteran National Award-winning filmmaker, known for his work in the Malayalam film industry. Jenuse holds a master's degree in Film Studies from London Film School. He is also an MBA graduate.

== Career ==
Jenuse started his career as an assistant director in Malayalam cinema. He worked on several ad films during his time at Nirvana Films, headed by Prakash Varma. He then went on to assist his father and many other renowned filmmakers like Lal Jose and Aashiq Abu. In 2015, he debuted as writer and director with the romantic comedy, 100 Days of Love. It received mixed reviews but was a decent commercial success. In 2019, he directed his second film, 9, a science fiction horror film. It was jointly produced by Prithviraj Productions and Sony Pictures. He is currently working on his third feature film in Telugu, Drive, starring Aadhi Pinisetty and Satyadev.

== Filmography ==
Key
†	Denotes films that have not yet been released

- All films are in Malayalam unless noted otherwise

As Director
Year	Title	Notes
2015	100 Days of Love	Debut
2019	9	
2025	Drive	Telugu film

As Actor
Year	Title	Role	Notes
2025	Rekhachithram	Young Kamal	Debut
