= Kainikkara Kumara Pillai =

Indian writer

- Born: 27 September 1900; Travancore
- Died: 9 December 1988 (aged 88)
- Occupations: Playwright, actor
- Notable work: Harichandra; Mathruka Manushyan; Mohavum, Mukhtiyum
- Spouse: Bagheerathi Kunjamma
- Relatives: Kainikkara Padmanabha Pillai (brother)
- Awards: 1970 Kerala Sahitya Akademi Award for Drama; 1975 Kerala Sangeetha Nataka Akademi Fellowship; 1986 Kerala Sahitya Akademi Fellowship; Puthezhan Award; Guruvayurappan Trust Award; SPCS Award

Kainikkara Kumara Pillai (27 September 1900 – 9 December 1988) was an Indian teacher, actor, short story writer, essayist and playwright of Malayalam literature, best known for his plays such as Harichandra, Mathruka Manushyan and Mohavum, Mukhtiyum. He was the younger brother of Kainikkara Padmanabha Pillai, a noted author and thinker. An author of 18 books, Kumara Pillai was awarded the Kerala Sahitya Akademi Award for Drama in 1970. The Kerala Sangeetha Nataka Akademi inducted him as a distinguished fellow in 1975 followed by the Kerala Sahitya Akademi in 1986.

== Biography ==
Kainikkara Kumara Pillai was born on 27 September 1900 at Travancore (present-day south Indian state of Kerala) to Nair parents Perunayil N. Kumara Pillai, a lawyer and an Ayurvedic physician and Haripattu Poothottal L. Parvathy Pilla. After completing his schooling at a number of schools like Changanassery Government Middle School, St, Berchman's High School, Mannar Nair Samajam School and Thiruvalla SCS High School, he completed his pre-university course at Maharaja's College, Ernakulam and obtained a BA in Philosophy from Government Arts College, Kumbakonam to start his career as a teacher at the NSS school in Kainikkara. Later, he served as the principal of the Karuvatta High School from 1924 to 1943, as the Head Master of Palkulangara High School in Thiruvananthapuram. and as the principal of Mahatma Gandhi College, Trivandrum (1955–56). Among other positions, he was a Director of Educational Services of All India Radio, Trivandrum.

Kumara Pillai was married to Bagheearthi Kunjamma. He died on 9 December 1988 at the age of 88.

== Legacy and honours ==
Kumara Pillai was one of the pioneers of modern Malayalam theatre and was a part of the Progressive Writers'Association whose members included Vaikom Muhammad Basheer, Thakazhi Sivasankara Pillai, Joseph Mundassery and P. Kesavadev. He started his literary career with Duranthasanka, an adaptation of Othello of William Shakespeare, which preceded eighteen books, composed of plays, short stories and essay compilations. A noted actor of the times, he also translated Shakespeare's Othello and Antony and Cleopatra, and adapted the play A New Way to Pay Old Debts by Philip Massinger, with the title Manimangalam. Manyasree Viswamithran, a Malayalam film made by Madhu in 1974, was based on a story by Kumara Pillai and it was he who wrote the screenplay and dialogues for the film. He taught Thakazhi Sivasankara Pillai in school and encouraged the aspiring writer to take up prose which helped him in his literary career. He was associated with Vidyalaya Poshini, an educational journal, serving as its chief editor for a while and was with the All India Radio, heading its educational programs. He also contributed to the development of public library movement in Kerala.

Kerala Sahitya Akademi selected Mathruka Manushyan, a play written by Kumara Pillai, for their annual award for drama in 1970, the play would later be included in the curriculum of the University of Travancore and Madras University. The Akademi honoured him again in 1986 with the distinguished fellowship in 1986, and in between, he was elected as a fellow by the Kerala Sangeetha Nataka Akademi in 1975. He was also a recipient of the Puthezhan Award, Guruvayurappan Trust Award and SPCS Award.

== Selected works ==
=== Plays ===
- Kumara Pillai, Kainikkara (1955). Vichara veechikal. Kottayam: National Book Stall.
- Kumara Pillai, Kainikkara (1938). Mohavum mukthiyum. Kottayam: Sahitya Pravarthaka Co-operative Society.
- Kumara Pillai, Kainikkara (1969). Mathrukamanushyan. Kottayam: Sahitya Pravarthaka Co-operative Society.
- Kumara Pillai, Kainikkara (1933). Harischandran. Kottayam: Sahitya Pravarthaka Co-operative Society.
- Kumara Pillai, Kainikkara (1938). Manimangalam. Kottayam: Sahitya Pravarthaka Co-operative Society.
- Kumara Pillai, Kainikkara (1946). Veshangal. Kottayam: Sahitya Pravarthaka Co-operative Society.
- Kumara Pillai, Kainikkara (1951). Prema Parinamam. Kottayam: Sahitya Pravarthaka Co-operative Society.
- Kumara Pillai, Kainikkara (1954). Agnipareeksha. Kottayam: Sahitya Pravarthaka Co-operative Society.
- Kumara Pillai, Kainikkara (1956). NingalAriyum. Kottayam: Sahitya Pravarthaka Co-operative Society. Archived from the original on 22 July 2022.
- Kumara Pillai, Kainikkara (1968). Satyathinde Panthavu. Kottayam: Sahitya Pravarthaka Co-operative Society.
- Kumara Pillai, Kainikkara (1968). Oulichukali. Kottayam: Sahitya Pravarthaka Co-operative Society.

=== Essays ===
- Kumara Pillai, Kainikkara (1978). Natakeeyam. Kottayam: National Book Stall.
- Kumara Pillai, Kainikkara (1984). Kainikkarayude prabandhangal. Kottayam: Little Prince Publications.
- Kumara Pillai, Kainikkara (1984). Avismaraneeyar (in Malayalam). Kottayam, N B S.
- Kumara Pillai, Kainikkara (1949). Kedavilakkukal. Kottayam: Sahitya Pravarthaka Co-operative Society.
- Kumara Pillai, Kainikkara (1952). Avismaraneeyar (in Malayalam). Thiruvananthapuram: Kamalalaya.
- Kumara Pillai, Kainikkara (1970). Gandhi Vichara Veethikal. Kottayam: Sahitya Pravarthaka Co-operative Society.

=== Short stories and novel ===
- Kumara Pillai, Kainikkara (1931). Durandashanga. Kottayam: Sahitya Pravarthaka Co-operative Society.
- Kumara Pillai, Kainikkara (1934). Balahradayam. Kottayam: Sahitya Pravarthaka Co-operative Society.
- Kumara Pillai, Kainikkara (1959). Achane Konna Makan (in Malayalam). Kottayam, N B S.

=== Translations ===
- Shakespeare, William (1967). Antoniyum Cleopatrayum. Translated by Kumara Pillai, Kainikkara. Kottayam: National Book Stall.

== See also ==
- List of Malayalam-language authors by category
- List of Malayalam-language authors
