= Kainikkara Padmanabha Pillai =

Indian author (1898–1976)

- Born: 10 October 1898; Travancore
- Died: 30 January 1976 (aged 77)
- Occupations: Playwright, actor
- Notable work: Swati Tirunal Maharaja; Veluttampi Dalava; Calvaryile Kalpapadapam; Vidhimandapam; Agnipanjaram
- Spouse: P. Chellamma
- Relatives: Kainikkara Kumara Pillai (brother)
- Awards: 1955 Kalyani Krishna Menon Puraskaram; 1967 Kerala Sahitya Akademi Award for Drama

Kainikkara Padmanabha Pillai (10 October 1898 – 30 January 1976), popularly identified as Swathithirunal Kainikkara Padmanabha Pillai after his magnum opus, Swathithirunal, was an Indian author of Malayalam literature, actor, speaker, teacher and thinker. He was known for his plays which dealt with themes such as patriotism, sacrifice and justice and his characters showed heroism, showing influence of William Shakespeare. Kerala Sahitya Akademi awarded him their annual award for drama in 1970. He was also a recipient of the Kalyani Krishna Menon Puraskaram.

== Biography ==
Kainikkara Padmanabha Pillai was born on October 10, 1898, at Perunna, Travancore (present-day south Indian state of Kerala) to Nair parents Perunayil N. Kumara Pillai, a lawyer and an Ayurvedic physician and Haripattu Poothottal L. Parvathy Pillai. After primary education at his local school, he studied at institutions in Kumbakonam and Thiruvananthapuram and started his career as a teacher at the NSS High School. He served the society in various capacities such as those of a headmaster, educational inspector and as the general manager until joining the government service in 1944 and before resigning from service, he held various positions including those of the director of education department, broadcasting corporation director, chairman of the pay commission and the secretary of the department of food. In between, he sat in the Legislative Council of Travancore from 1933 to 1944. Later, he served as the editor of Malayalarajyam (1954–56)and Kaumudi (1957–61). It was during this period, Kaumudi was involved in the leak of the 1957 budget of the First E. M. S. Namboodiripad ministry where the reporter who leaked the budget as well as Pillai, as the editor of Kaumudi were fined by the court. He also contested unsuccessfully from the Mavelikkara-Kollam parliamentary constituency.

Padmanabha Pillai was married to P. Chellama. He died on January 30, 1976, at the age of 77. Kainikkara Kumara Pillai, noted playwright and the author of books such as Harichandra was his brother.

== Legacy and honours ==
Padmanabha Pillai published 15 books composed of 6 plays, 3 novels, 4 short story anthologies, an essay compilation and a book of history, but he was best known for his plays of which Calvaryile Kalpapadapam, written in the 1934, was a pioneering work of modern Malayalam theatre. He was known to have drawn on the heritage of E.V. Krishna Pillai (1895–1938) with his historical works like Veluttampi Dalava, published in 1932, which describes the deeds and death of a minister of the state of Travancore and his plays evidently displayed an influence of William Shakespeare. His 1959 book The Red Interlude in Kerala published for the Kerala Pradesh Congress Committee is a historical discourse on how the communists came to power in Kerala and the book is often quoted in analyses of the politics of that period.

Pillai received the Kalyani Krishna Menon Puraskaram for his play, Vidhimandapam, in 1955. The Kerala Sahitya Akademi Award for Drama selected Swathi Tirunal, his 1966 play on the life of the former king of Travancore for their annual award for drama in 1967.He was given a Sahitya Akademi Award in 1967. Kainikkara Padmanabha Pillai Foundation, is an eponymous organization which has instituted Kainikkara Award, an annual award for recognizing excellence in socio-cultural work.

== Selected works ==
- Padmanabha Pilla, Kainikkara (1932). Veluthambi dhalava. S.P.C.S.
- Padmanabha Pillai. Kainikkara (1935). Kalvariyile kalpapadapam (Calvary's Wish-fulfilling Tree). Educational Supplies depot, Thiruvananthapuram: Educational Supplies depot.
- Padmanabha Pilla, Kainikkara (1953). Yavanika. S.P.C.S.
- Padmanabha Pillai, Kainikkara (1955). Vidhimandapam (Court of Judgment) (in Malayalam). Kottayam, Sahithya Pravarthaka Co-operative Society.
- Kainikkara Padmanabha Pillai (1959). Communist Bharanam Keralathil. Kottayam: DC Books.
- Kainikkara Padmanabha Pillai (1959). The Red Interlude in Kerala. Kerala Pradesh Congress Committee.
- Padmanabha Pillai, Kainikkara (1962). Agnipanjaram (Skeleton of Fire) (in Malayalam). Kottayam, Sahithya Pravarthaka Co-operative Society.
- Padmanabha Pillai, Kainikkara (1964). Mekhavum Minnalum (Clouds and Lightning) (in Malayalam). Kottayam, Sahithya Pravarthaka Co-operative Society. Archived from the original on 28 March 2022.
- Padmanabha Pillai, Kainikkara (1964). Ningal Ariyum (You know this) (in Malayalam). Kottayam, Sahithya Pravarthaka Co-operative Society.
- Kainikkara Padmabhapilla (1966). Swathithirunal. Kottayam: N.B.S.
- Padmanabha Pillai, Kainikkara (1968). Naatakapoornima. Kottayam, Sahithya Pravarthaka Co-operative Society.
- Padmanabha Pillai, Kainikkara (1972). Ezhu thirivilakku. Kottayam: National book stall.
- Padmanabha Pilla, Kainikkara (1974). Keralathinte nalambhalathil. Sahitya Pravarthaka Sahakarana Sangam.
- Pillai, Kainikkara Padmanabha (2004). Ozhukkukal. DC Books. ASIN B007E4W3ZU.

== See also ==
- List of Malayalam-language authors by category
- List of Malayalam-language authors
