= Punyam Aham =

- Directed by: Raj Nair
- Produced by: Raj Nair; Janardhanan Menon; Shyam Prasad Reddy
- Starring: Prithviraj Sukumaran; Samvrutha Sunil; Nedumudi Venu
- Cinematography: M. J. Radhakrishnan
- Edited by: Beena Paul
- Music by: Isaac Thomas Kottukapally
- Release date: 22 January 2010
- Country: India
- Language: Malayalam

Punyam Aham is a 2010 Indian Malayalam-language film directed by Raj Nair. Prithviraj, Samvrutha Sunil, and Nedumudi Venu play the lead roles in this film.

== Plot ==
Punyam Aham is set in a small village in northern Kerala. The protagonist is Narayan Unni, a young man with a Brahmin father and a low-caste mother, who are separated, leaving the mother to raise him alone. The film tells the story of Unni leaving home and searching for his identity, and then repeating many of his father's mistakes in life. It is based on the story in traditional folklore about Naranath Bhranthan and his father Vararuchi.

== Cast ==
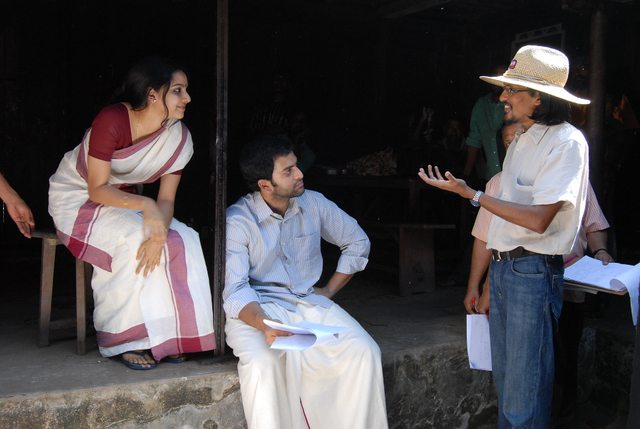
Samvrutha with co-star Prithviraj and director Raj Nair during the shoot of the film

- Prithviraj Sukumaran as Naarayanan Unni
- Samvrutha Sunil as Jayasree
- Nedumudi Venu as Kaarackal Easwaran Namboodiri
- Nedumudi Harikumar as Shopkeeper
- Nishanth Sagar as Georgekutty
- Roslin as Antharjanam
- Sona Nair as Eldest Sister
- K. P. A. C. Lalitha as Jayasree's Amma
- M. R. Gopakumar as Pappanassar
- Sreejith Ravi as Pankan
- Sreekala VK as Narayanan's mother
- Binda as Younger sister

== Production ==
Punyam Aham was the directorial debut of Raj Nair, the grandson of novelist Thakazhi Shivashankara Pillai. Filming began in January 2009 at Ottapalam, and then shifted to Kuttanad. It premiered at the Mumbai International Film Festival in October 2010.

== Critical reception ==
Paresh C. Palicha, writing for Rediff Movies, criticised the plot for being "too intellectual".
