= 9 (2019 film) =

2019 film by Jenuse Mohamed

- Theatrical release poster
- Directed by: Jenuse Mohamed
- Written by: Jenuse Mohamed
- Produced by: Supriya Menon
- Starring: Prithviraj Sukumaran; Wamiqa Gabbi; Alok Krishna; Mamta Mohandas; Prakash Raj
- Cinematography: Abinandhan Ramanujam
- Edited by: Shameer Muhammed
- Music by: Songs: Shaan Rahman; Score: Sekhar Menon
- Production company: Prithviraj Productions
- Distributed by: Sony Pictures Releasing International
- Release date: 7 February 2019 (India)
- Running time: 148 minutes
- Country: India
- Language: Malayalam

9 (or Nine) is a 2019 Indian Malayalam-language science fiction horror film written and directed by Jenuse Mohamed. It was produced by Prithviraj Productions, and distributed by Sony Pictures Releasing International. The film stars Prithviraj Sukumaran, Wamiqa Gabbi, Alok Krishna, Mamta Mohandas, and Prakash Raj in lead roles. It marks the first regional Indian film production and distribution of Sony Pictures and the debut of Prithviraj Productions.

In the film, a global crisis arises when a comet passes very close to the Earth for nine days. The film explores Albert Lewis and his son Adam's lives, as a direct result of the comet. 9 was released in India and Gulf Cooperation Council territories on 7 February 2019.

== Plot ==
Dr. Albert Lewis is a widowed astrophysicist living in Kerala with his 8-year-old son, Adam. He is emotionally distant from his son whom he silently believes to be the reason he lost his beloved wife, Annie, who died in childbirth. His only other kin, Annie's brother, is hostile to Albert and Adam as he feels Adam is evil and is the cause of a freak accident that rendered his son paralysed while he and Adam were playing on the terrace. Adam is shown to be a gloomy but seemingly perceptive boy and is shown to have run into trouble with authorities several times and Albert is irked by this too.

A comet from an unknown galaxy is projected to pass beside Earth which will cause a huge electromagnetic pulse (EMP) surge and is predicted to last nine days. During these nine days, none of the modern inventions, including electricity, phones, and engine-run vehicles will work anywhere in the world. Several days before this phenomenon, Albert's mentor, Dr. Inayat Khan, visits him at his house and asks him to research the comet. He sends him to a place in the Indian Himalayas, from where the closest sighting of the comet is expected. Inayat also says to Albert that this incident is long portrayed by the locals over there and their caves have drawings of the comet with its earlier and future occurrences. Albert, with his colleagues and son, goes to the Himalayas for research. Albert and Adam opt to stay at an old bungalow owned by Dr. Inayat with Hakka, an old janitor from the local tribe to assist them.

The story progresses with the appearance of another character named Ava. Adam has bad feelings about Ava, as she tries to trap him. Adam informs Albert, but his father doesn't take it right. Once when Adam and Hakka are talking, Ava takes Adam and haunts him for telling about her to Albert. Hakka, for seeing, is injured by Ava. Adam and Albert leave the house. Albert is attacked by Ava and Adam is taken. Albert wakes at Dr. Inayat's where he tells him that Ava is actually Albert and that he has bipolar schizoaffective disorder which explains why Adam was frightened by him in a few scenes and tells him he has one day to see Adam alive or else, the police are involved. Adam is found, and Ava leaves as the last night goes, happily leaving the father-son duo. Then, Albert asks Adam who Ava is, causing Adam to gasp, hinting at Ava's existence. The mid-credits scene shows a cave with a painting on its walls, showing a cosmic creature with a female-like appearance tormenting people, indicating that Ava is real.

== Cast ==
- Prithviraj Sukumaran as Dr. Albert Lewis (father of Adam and husband Of Annie) and also Lewis (Dr. Albert's father)
  - Vishal Krishna as Young Albert
- Alok Krishna as Adam (son of Albert and Annie)
- Wamiqa Gabbi as Ava-An unexplainable being who befriends Albert (Voice dubbed by Srilatha)
- Mamta Mohandas as Annie Albert Lewis (Dr Alberts's wife who died while giving birth to Adam)
- Prakash Raj as Dr. Inayat Khan
- Amalda Liz as Divya
- Uday Chandra as Hakka
- Tony Luke as Sandeep Murthy
- Rahul Madhav as James (Annie's brother and Albert's brother-in-law)
- Adil Ibrahim as Doctor Rahul (Albert's friend)

== Production ==
=== Development ===
On 6 November 2016, The Times of India reported that Jenuse Mohamed is set to direct an untitled science fiction horror film written by himself, with Prithviraj Sukumaran signed to play the lead role. Confirming the project to the news-daily, Mohamed said that they are hoping to start filming after March 2017, and the film will be mostly shot in Himachal Pradesh and in Kerala for the remaining portion. He also added that Parvathy Thiruvothu and Nithya Menen would be acting beside Prithviraj (both were later replaced). In March 2018, Prithviraj announced that the film, titled 9, will be jointly produced by his newly formed production house, Prithviraj Productions, in partnership with Sony Pictures. The film was reportedly scheduled to begin filming in the following month. 9 marks the debut of Prithviraj Productions and the first regional Indian film of Sony Pictures.

Jenuse wrote the complete screenplay of 9 within a week. He approached Prithviraj in 2016. Prithviraj initially signed the film as an actor and producing the film was not in his mind, but later when he decided to launch a production house with his wife, Supriya Menon, they chose 9 as their debut production. Its pre-production began in 2017.

=== Filming ===
Principal photography began on 9 April 2018 in Thiruvananthapuram, Kerala. Filming also took place in Kochi. The shooting schedule in Kerala was completed on 18 April. The final scenes in this schedule was shot at Kuttikkanam hill station in Idukki district. Abinandhan Ramanujam was the cinematographer. High precision movie camera was required for filming as almost 60 percent of the film was to be shot at night. Beginning from its second schedule in Manali, Himachal Pradesh, the Red Digital Cinema Gemini 5K camera was used for filming, in its debut use in Indian cinema. The team completed shooting in Spiti Valley by June 2018. The filming was wrapped in Delhi where a song sequence was shot. Principal photography was completed in 48 days. The major part of the filming took place in Manali and Spiti Valley. It took more than six months for post-production. The film's production was completed at a cost lower than the estimated budget.

== Music ==
The film features background score composed by Sekhar Menon and two songs composed by Shaan Rahman. It was released by Sony Music India.

9 (Nine)
| No. | Title | Writer(s) | Singer(s) | Length |
|---|---|---|---|---|
| 1. | "Akale" | B. K. Harinarayanan, Preeti Nambiar | Harib Hussain, Anne Amie |
| 2. | "Vicharamo" | B. K. Harinarayanan | Anne Amie |

== Release ==
9 was released in India and Gulf Cooperation Council territories on 7 February 2019 by Sony Pictures Releasing International.
