= Police Police =

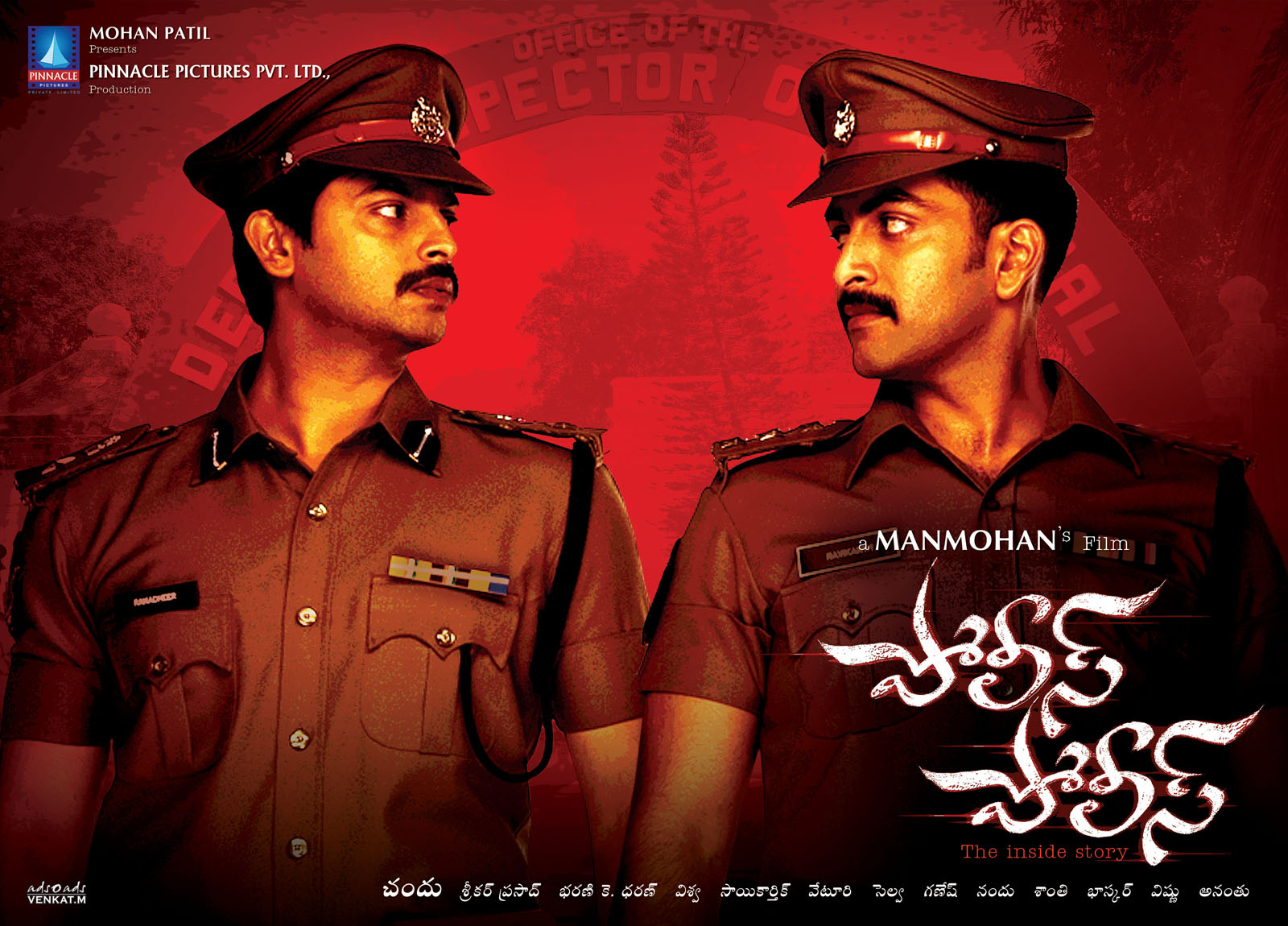
- Directed by: Manmohan Challa
- Written by: Manmohan Challa
- Produced by: Chandu; Bhaskar Kandagatla; Mohan Rao Kalyan Patil
- Starring: Prithviraj Sukumaran; Sriram; Kamalinee Mukherjee; Sanjjana
- Cinematography: Bharani K. Dharan
- Edited by: A. Sreekar Prasad
- Music by: Vishwa; Sai Karthik
- Production company: Pinnacle Pictures
- Release date: 9 April 2010
- Running time: 142 minutes
- Country: India
- Language: Telugu

Police Police is a 2010 Indian Telugu-language action film directed by Manmohan Challa and produced by Chandu, Mohan Rao Kalyan Patil and Bhaskar Kandagatla. The film stars Prithviraj Sukumaran (in his Telugu debut), Sriram, Kamalinee Mukherjee and Sanjjana in the lead roles. The film was released after a two-year delay due to problems with releasing the Tamil version, which was later dropped. The film has been dubbed in Tamil as Kutrappirivu in May 2010. The story revolves around two police officers with different ideologies. The film was released on 9 April 2010.

== Plot ==
SP Ranadheer is a sincere cop who tries to remove wrongdoers, whereas ASP Ravikanth is a corrupt police officer with ties to antisocial people. Ranadheer suspects Ravikanth as the culprit but is unable to prove it. In the event, he also loses his wife Harika. How Ranadheer manages to prove Ravikanth as the culprit forms the rest of the story.

== Cast ==
- Prithviraj Sukumaran as DSP Ravikanth
- Sriram as SP K. Ranadheer IPS
- Kamalinee Mukherjee as Harika
- Sanjjana as Sandhya
- Vikram as Imran
- Ahuti Prasad as Tajuddin
- Kadhal Dhandapani as Janardhan
- Brahmaji as Sivaji
- Vizag Prasad as DGP
- Madhusudhan Rao as Gangadhar
- C. V. L. Narasimha Rao as Swamy
- Vasu Inturi as Venkatachalam
- Sritej as Chanakya
- Pruthvi as DSP David
- Amit Tiwari as Sudarshan
- Venu as Venu Manmohan

== Production ==
Sriram wanted to work in Telugu films and contacted Manmohan Challa, who used to dub his Tamil films in Telugu. Prithviraj, who starred with Sriram in Kana Kandaen, was cast, marking his first Telugu film. Prithviraj put on weight for his role in the film. Minissha Lamba was originally chosen to play the heroine and Chakri was originally chosen to compose the music. The film began production in 2008 as a bilingual in Telugu and Tamil with the Tamil version titled Idam Valam. The Tamil version was later dropped.

== Soundtrack ==
No.	Title	Singer(s)	Length
1.	"Emo Edemaina"	Sai Karthik	3:18
2.	"Aaja Sakhi"	Prassana, Chinmayi Sripada	4:11
3.	"Cheka Cheka"	Viswa	3:49
4.	"Police Police (version 1)"	Viswa	3:56
5.	"Police Police (version 2)"	Viswa	3:55
6.	"Evade Veedu"	Viswa, Suchitra	4:11
Total length:			21:99
