= Adyghe =

Adyghe may refer to:

- Adyghe language, the language of the Adyghe people, also called Circassian
  - Adyghe phonology
  - Adyghe grammar
- Adyghe people, also known as Circassians
- Adyghe Autonomous Oblast, an autonomous oblast of the Russian SFSR which existed from 1922 to 1991

== See also ==
- Republic of Adygea, one of the republics of Russia and the successor of the Adyghe Autonomous Oblast
