= Indian Rupee (film) =

2011 Malayalam-language Indian film

- Theaterical poster
- Directed by: Ranjith
- Written by: Ranjith
- Produced by: Shaji Nadesan; Prithviraj Sukumaran; Santhosh Sivan
- Starring: Prithviraj Sukumaran; Thilakan; Rima Kallingal; Tini Tom; Jagathy Sreekumar
- Cinematography: S. Kumar
- Edited by: Vijay Shankar
- Music by: Shahabaz Aman
- Production company: August Cinema
- Distributed by: August Cinema
- Release date: 26 October 2011
- Running time: 155 minutes
- Country: India
- Language: Malayalam

Indian Rupee is a 2011 Indian Malayalam satirical film written and directed by Ranjith Balakrishnan, and produced by August Cinema. The film stars Prithviraj Sukumaran, Thilakan, Tini Tom and Jagathy Sreekumarin along with significant roles for Fahad Fasil, Asif Ali and Joju George in cameo appearance.

The film was released on 26 October 2011, coinciding with Diwali and to a positive response from critics. It received numerous accolades including National Film Award for Best Feature Film in Malayalam and Kerala State Film Award for Best Film.

== Plot ==
Indian Rupee is a satirical dig on making quick money without sweating it out and youth blindly following on such examples. Jayaprakash or JP is a small-time real estate dealer based in Calicut, who dreams of making it big someday. JP is a school drop-out and in love with his cousin Beena who is a doctor, though her parents are not aware of his feelings for her. JP along with his partner CH is scouting for land deals. He is working under a senior agent Raayin but wishes to break free as soon as possible. He believes that his fortune is about to change, when Achutha Menon, an old widower approaches him to sell off his son's land. The deal never happens but Achutha Menon stays with JP and CH, and becomes a part of their life. Things start happening in a fantastic way for JP, soon after. JP manages to earn a decent fortune after some smart moves and tricks, but he learns some valuable lessons by the end of the process. The person whom JP tried to cheat, "Golden" Pappan, helps him out in this. JP vows to make money in an honest way, instead of through tricky deals.

== Cast ==
- Prithviraj Sukumaran as Jayaprakash/JP
- Thilakan as Adv. Achutha Menon
- Rima Kallingal as Dr. Beena
- Tini Tom as C. Hameed /CH
- Jagathy Sreekumar as Golden Pappan
- Lalu Alex as Surendran
- Kalpana as Mary
- Revathi as Dr. Sheela Koshy
- Mamukkoya as Raayin Ikka
- Biju Pappan as Joy
- Zeenath as Yashodha
- Mallika as Sajitha
- Arun V. Narayan as Satheeshan
- Irshad as Asharaf
- Suresh Krishna as Chandrashekhar Menon
- Sadiq as Sathyan
- Shivaji Guruvayoor
- Babu Namboothiri
- Shammi Thilakan as Damodaran
- T. P. Madhavan
- Appunni Sasi as Ganeshan
- Sasi Kalinga as Nambiar

The film featured cameo appearances from Joju George, Asif Ali, Fahadh Faasil, and Augustine.

== Soundtrack ==
Indian Rupee

Soundtrack album by Shahabaz Aman
- Released: 23 August 2011
- Genre: Film soundtrack
- Length: 17:00
- Label: Mathrubhumi Music
- Producer: Shahabaz Aman

Shahabaz Aman chronology
Pakal Nakshatrangal (2008)	Indian Rupee (2011)	Spirit (2012)

All music is composed by Shahabaz Aman.

No.	Title	Lyrics	Artist(s)	Length
1.	"Pokayayi"	V. R. Santhosh	G. Venugopal, Asha G. Menon	3:36
2.	"Anthimanam"	V. R. Santhosh	M. G. Sreekumar, Sujatha Mohan	4:10
3.	"Ee Puzhayum"	Mullanezhi	Vijay Yesudas	4:40
4.	"Ee Puzhayum" (unplugged)	Mullanezhi	Vijay Yesudas	4:24

The audio release function was held at Puliyarmala Krishna Gowdar hall, Kalpetta, Wayanad on 23 August 2011. The song Ee Puzhayum Sandhyakalum from the film was the last song of the veteran poet-cum-lyricist Mullanezhi, who died soon after the film was released.

== Reception ==
The film opened to positive reviews from critics. Reviewers have praised Ranjith Balakrishnan in presenting such an "oft-told story" in such a refreshing way.

Deccan Chronicle said, "Touching a thriving social chord of life, Indian Rupee is a movie minus drama packed with the intricacies of life's realities." Rediff.com observed – "Indian Rupee should be seen by people who think that good stories have vanished from films. Ranjith has just told the story of contemporary Kerala society in a most interesting way." Nowrunning.com commented: "The details are downright gripping, the asides sparkling and the setups almost surreal, so much so that Indian Rupee hops straight into the year's must-see movies list and scrambles right up to the top". the site added that it is as easily one of the best performances from Prithviraj, and says that "Indian Rupee would as much be remembered for Prithviraj the actor, as the actor would be remembered for the film."

Sify.com wrote -"Though it is a bit too melodramatic and even preachy at times, Indian Rupee is easily one of the finest films of the year. It has honesty written all over it and such efforts need to be seen and appreciated by the audience."

== Box office ==
The film has taken ₹ 2.5 crore as distributor's share from theatres.

== Accolades ==
National Film Awards (2011)

- Best Feature Film in Malayalam

Kerala State Film Awards (2011)

- Best Film

Filmfare Awards South

- Best Supporting Actor - Malayalam - Thilakan
- Best Playback Singer (Male) - Malayalam - "Ee Puzhayum" - Vijay Yesudas

Asianet Film Awards

- Best Director – Ranjith Balakrishnan
