= Ayalum Njanum Thammil =

- Theatrical release poster
- Directed by: Lal Jose
- Written by: Bobby Sanjay
- Produced by: Prem Prakash
- Starring: Prithviraj Sukumaran; Pratap Pothen
- Cinematography: Jomon T. John
- Edited by: Ranjan Abraham
- Music by: Ouseppachan
- Production company: Prakash Movie Tone
- Distributed by: Century Films
- Release date: 19 October 2012
- Running time: 133 minutes
- Country: India
- Language: Malayalam

Ayalum Njanum Thammil (English: Between Him and Me) is a 2012 Indian Malayalam-language medical drama film directed by Lal Jose. The film produced by Prem Prakash was written by his sons Bobby and Sanjay. It stars Prithviraj Sukumaran and Pratap Pothen with Narain, Samvrutha Sunil, Rima Kallingal, Remya Nambeesan and Kalabhavan Mani in supporting roles.

Ayalum Njanum Thammil is a story of a committed senior doctor and an irresponsible junior doctor. Through their relationship, a vivid picture of the medical profession is drawn. The soundtrack and background score were composed by Ouseppachan. The film was released on 19 October 2012 to widespread critical acclaim. It won four Kerala State Film Awards, including Best Popular Film, Best Director, and Best Actor for Prithviraj Sukumaran.

== Plot ==
Dr. Ravi Tharakan is a renowned cardiac surgeon working in a private hospital. The plot begins with a traumatised girl being brought to the hospital. Ravi decides to operate on the girl for free, against the wishes of her father. The girl dies during the surgery. Her father and a few local politicians accuse Ravi for the death and protest in the hospital. Ravi is forced to flee through the back door, followed by the girl's relatives. He has an accident on the way and goes missing without any trace. The girl's death gains media attention, and the police start a thorough search for Ravi. The hospital management clears its name by sacking Ravi, but the chairman's private secretary Diya expresses dissatisfaction over the hospital's decision and starts a search on her own. She is very much attached to Ravi, who had once convinced her the importance of following ethics in the medical profession. She meets Dr. Vivek, who is a very close friend and a former classmate of Ravi.

At their private medical college, Ravi and Vivek were amongst the worst students. They were irresponsible in their studies and were not even able to distinguish between surgical instruments. Ravi had a campus romance, a junior student named Sainaba alias Sainu. After completing the course, Ravi and Vivek were left with two options: either to pay the college ₹5 lakh or to do an internship in a village hospital. Vivek opts to pay. Ravi, who is not able to get the cash from his father Thomas, chooses to work in the Redemption Hospital in Munnar, which is run by Dr. P. J. Samuel — an altruistic physician who, by his absolute devotion to his profession, lives a lonely life. On his way to Munnar, Ravi's car accidentally crashes with a police vehicle and Ravi is in turn insulted and harassed by ASI Purushothaman, a corrupt and arrogant policeman who didn't even listen to his plea. Ravi lodges a complaint and gets him suspended.

Ravi initially finds the job at the hospital uninteresting, mainly due to the uncompromising Samuel, who is very strict. He hates the lonely stay in a "jail-like" staff-quarters. The only consolations for Ravi are the letters by Sainu and occasional phone calls to Vivek. Ravi is soon accompanied by Supriya, another junior doctor, who helps him develop an interest in the job. However, he still finds it difficult to adjust to Samuel. Some months later, Samuel informs Ravi about a phone call that he received from Sainu's parents, who are planning to marry Sainu to someone else after they received Ravi's letter to Sainu. Samuel was also asked to forbid Ravi from meeting or calling her. Ravi seeks help from Vivek, who secretly makes all arrangements for Ravi's and Sainu's marriage in Kochi, but Ravi is stopped by Purushothaman on his way, during a routine police check. Purushothaman who was actually waiting to avenge his suspension, does not leave Ravi even after hearing about the marriage. Ravi arrives late only to know that Sainu is house arrested, who has unwillingly agreed for another marriage. He tries to get Sainu out from her house but fails.

This incident shakes Ravi completely. His lonely stay in Munnar also haunts him, but he is able to be sincere to his job. One day, a girl Gouri is brought to the hospital in a serious condition. Ravi, the only duty doctor, rushes and nearly treats her. But after realising that she is Purushothaman's daughter, he decides not to attend the case. He decided to take his revenge on Purushothaman as Ravi lost Sainu due to his rude behaviour. He rejects the requests of hospital staff and other inmates. Not even the tears shed by Purushothaman at his feet are enough to melt his heart. Gauri's condition becomes very serious, but she is saved by Samuel, who arrives sometime later. An angry Samuel slaps Ravi for his negligence. Insulted, Ravi decides to leave the place immediately but is stopped by Supriya, who supports Samuel's action. The next day, Ravi is summoned by a committee for investigation of a complaint filed by Purushothaman. Ravi is silent throughout the interrogation, and the committee decides to recommend that the Medical Council cancel his recognition. However, Samuel testifies for Ravi stating that Ravi is innocent and since Gouri is saved, there arises no case of medical negligence. This incident and Samuel's testifying turns out to be an eye-opener for Ravi. His attitude to the purpose of life changes completely which he is able to follow throughout his later life. He leaves Redemption Hospital after his internship and leaves for London to pursue his higher studies, and later works in hospitals and gains a name for being service-minded.

Having known more about Ravi from Vivek and Supriya, Diya comes to the conclusion that Ravi might have gone to meet Samuel. The police also tracks him at Munnar after tracing his phone calls. In a cemetery, Ravi is shown talking to Samuel about the girl's death, but it is later shown that Samuel is no more and that it was the news of Samuel's death that brought Ravi to Munnar. Ravi is arrested by the police and is brought to court. He is acquitted in the case after the dead girl's mother testifies for Ravi stating that it was upon her behest that Ravi opted to operate the girl.

In the final scene, Ravi is shown sitting in front of the Redemption Hospital, with a narration from himself playing simultaneously, "This is the place where Dr. Ravi Tharakan was born."

== Cast ==
- Prithviraj Sukumaran as Dr. Ravi Tharakan
- Prathap Pothen as Dr. P. J. Samuel
- Narain as Dr. Vivek
- Samvrutha Sunil as Sainaba (Sainu)
- Rima Kallingal as Diya
- Remya Nambeesan as Dr. Supriya
- Swasika as Neethu
- Kalabhavan Mani as ASI Purushothaman
- Salim Kumar as Thomachan
- Prem Prakash as Thomas Tharakan
- Sreenath Bhasi as Rahul Samuel
- Anil Murali as Sasi
- Surabhi Lakshmi as Sujatha
- Ramu as Dr. Hari Varma
- Sukumari as Sister Lucy
- Ambika Mohan as Mary Thomas
- Sidhartha Siva as Babuji
- Hemanth Menon as Jojo
- Vijay Babu as Commissioner Ameer Muhammad IPS
- Rony David as Commissioner Tony Varghese IPS
- Balachandran Chullikkadu as Murali, External Examiner
- Dinesh Prabhakar as T. P. Ramesh (Member)
- Dinesh Panicker as Dr. Panicker
- V.K. Baiju as Idukki SP
- Deepika Mohan as Doctor
- Manju Satheesh as Purushothaman's wife
- Kavitha Lakshmi as Vishal's mother

== Production ==
The film was produced by Prem Prakash under the banner of Prakash Movie Tone and distributed by Century Films. The costume designer is Sameera Saneesh who worked in films such as Ustad Hotel and Thattathin Marayathu. Audiography was done by M. R. Rajakrishnan. Raghu Ram Varma is the associate director and Gokul Das is the art director. Prithviraj plays the lead role with Narain. Samvrutha Sunil plays the lead heroine, while Rima Kallingal and Remya Nambeeshan plays the secondary heroines. Prathap Pothan plays the role of the senior doctor. The cinematography is handled by Jomon T. John after Thattathin Marayathu, who has been emerging cameraman who excelled with his 7D camera. The film started its shoot at 11 July at Shoranur. Its shoot restarted on 3 August 2012 at Munnar. The film pictures parts of Kochi, Thiruvalla, Kottayam, Munnar and Thrissur. Kottayam Medical College was also pictured in this film. Audiography was by M. R. Rajakrishnan.

== Reception ==
=== Critical reception ===
Paresh C. Palicha of Rediff.com gave a positive review of 3 out of 5 and said "Ayalum Njanum Thammil is yet another must-watch film from director Lal Jose, and Prithviraj is an added bonus." "Prithviraj has given his career's best performance in Ayalum Njanum Thammil", says Palicha.

A review by The Times of India gave 3.5 out of 5 and said "Lal Jose makes Ayalum Njanum Thammil highly lovable with his discreet choice of locale, interiors and an array of characters who make the film endearing... The film radiates a grace that gently switches between the past and the present to reveal the life of Dr Ravi Tharakan (Prithviraj). Ravi Tharakan becomes one of the most brilliant portrayals done by the Prithviraj."

=== Box office ===
The film became a box office success. The film collected ₹7 crore (final run) from Kerala box office.

== Accolades ==
Kerala State Film Awards (2012)

- Best Film With Popular Appeal and Aesthetic Value
- Best Director – Lal Jose
- Best Actor – Prithviraj
- Best Comedy Actor – Salim Kumar

South Indian International Movie Awards (2013) (Malayalam)

- Best Director – Lal Jose
- Nominated—Best Film
- Nominated—Best Actor – Prithviraj
- Nominated—Best Actor in a Supporting Role – Prathap Pothen
- Nominated—Best Comedian – Salim Kumar
- Nominated—Best Music Director – Ouseppachan
- Nominated—Best Lyricist – Sarath Vayalar for "Azhalinte"

Filmfare Awards South (2013)

- Best Film – Malayalam
- Best Director – Malayalam – Lal Jose

== Soundtrack ==
Ayalum Njanum Thammil

Soundtrack album by Ouseppachan
- Released: 7 October 2012
- Recorded: 2012
- Genre: Film soundtrack
- Length: 39:34
- Language: Malayalam
- Label: Eastcoast Audios
- Producer: Ouseppachan

Ouseppachan chronology
Kalikalam (2012)	Ayalum Njanum Thammil (2012)	Kamaal Dhamaal Malamaal (2012)

All lyrics are written by Vayalar Sarath Chandra Varma; all music is composed by Ouseppachan.

Tracklist
No.	Title	Singer(s)	Length
1.	"Azhalinte Azhangalil"	Nikhil Mathew	5:39
2.	"Januvariyil"	Vijay Yesudas, Franco Simon, Cicily	4:54
3.	"Thulli Manjinullil"	Gayathri	5:00
4.	"Thulli Manjinullil" (Male)	Najim Arshad	4:55
5.	"Azhalinte Azhangalil" (Female)	Abhirami Ajai	5:38
6.	"Thulli Manjinullil" (Instrumental)		5:00
7.	"Januvariyil" (Instrumental)		4:54
8.	"Azhalinte Azhangalil" (Instrumental)		5:39
Total length:			39:34
