= List of Malayalam films of 2005 =

The following is a list of Malayalam films released in the year 2005.

| Title | Director | Screenplay | Cast |
|---|---|---|---|
| Immini Nalloraal | Rajasenan | Rajasenan | Jayasurya, Navya Nair |
| Kalyana Kurimanam | | | Abbas, Vijayaraghavan, Nandhana, Mithun Ramesh |
| Udayananu Tharam | Roshan Andrews | Sreenivasan | Mohanlal, Meena, Sreenivasan, Mukesh |
| Iruvattam Manavaatti | Sanal | Ashok V. C. | Kunchacko Boban, Kavya Madhavan |
| Achuvinte Amma | Sathyan Anthikkad | Ranjan Pramod | Urvashi, Narain, Meera Jasmine |
| Finger Print | Satish Paul | Siddique | Jayaram, Indrajith, Gopika |
| Makalkku | Jayaraj | Madampu Kunjukuttan | Suresh Gopi, Shobana |
| Annorikkal | Sathyachandran Wayanad | Sathyachandran Wayanad | Narain, Kavya Madhavan |
| Hridayathil Sookshikkan | Rajesh Pillai | Kalavoor Ravikumar | Kunchako Boban, Bhavana |
| Isra | Prakash Chokkad | | Karan, Vindhya, Riyaz Khan |
| Hai | K. R. Ramdas | V. R. Gopalakrishnan | Riyaz Khan, Jagathy Sreekumar |
| Junior Senior | G. Sreekandan | | Kunchako Boban, Mukesh, Meenakshi |
| Ponmudipuzhayorathu | Johnson Esthappan | Johnson Esthappan | Madhu Warrier, Sheela, Aravind, Meenakshi |
| Thommanum Makkalum | Shafi | Benny P. Nayarambalam | Mammootty, Lal, Rajan P Dev, Laya |
| Arabikadhakal | Prakash | | Bala, Vikram, Kalabhavan Mani, Parvathi Melton, Manikuttan, Arun, Nagma, Aishwarya Bhaskaran |
| Kanne Madanguka | Alberrt Antoni | | Murali, Navya Nair |
| Oridam | Pradeep Nair | Pradeep Nair | Geethu Mohandas |
| Ullam | M. D. Sukumaran | M. D. Sukumaran | Suresh Gopi, Geethu Mohandas |
| Athbhutha Dweepu | Vinayan | Vinayan | Prithviraj, Mallika Kapoor, Guinness Pakru |
| Alice in Wonderland | Sibi Malayil | Gireesh Kumar | Jayaram, Vineeth, Laya, Sandhya |
| Kochi Rajavu | Johny Antony | Udayakrishna-Sibi K Thomas | Dileep, Kavya Madhavan, Rambha |
| Chandrolsavam | Ranjith | Ranjith | Mohanlal, Meena |
| Made in USA | Rajeev Anchal | | Madhavan, Kaveri, Neha Pendse |
| Krithyam | Viji Thampi | Kaloor Dennis | Prithviraj, Pavithra, Eva Pavithran |
| Bunglavil Outha | Santhivila Dinesh | Raghunath Paleri | Lal, Sajan Surya, Bhavana |
| Ben Johnson | Anil C. Menon | T. A. Shahid | Kalabhavan Mani, Indraja |
| Daivanamathil | Jayaraj | Aryadan Shaukkath | Prithviraj, Bhavana |
| Five Fingers | Sanjeev Raj | Suresh Babu | Kunchacko Boban, Karthika |
| Thaskara Veeran | Pramod Pappan | Dennis Joseph | Mammootty, Nayanthara, Sheela |
| Police | V K.Prakash | | Prithviraj, Indrajith, Bhavana, Chaya Singh |
| Pauran | Sundardas | | Jayaram, Geethu Mohandas, Kalabhavan Mani, Jishnu Raghavan |
| Otta Nanayam | Suresh Kannan | Kaloor Dennis | Dinu Dennis, Priyamani |
| Raappakal | Kamal | T.A. Razaq | Mammootty, Nayanthara, Sharadha, Geethu Mohandas |
| Vacation | K. K. Haridas | | Lalu Alex, Suhasini Maniratnam |
| Pandippada | Rafi Mecartin | Rafi Mecartin | Dileep, Navya Nair, Prakash Raj |
| Deepangal Sakshi | K. B. Madhu | P. S. Kumar | Indrajith Sukumaran, Manoj K. Jayan, Navya Nair |
| Udayon | Bhadran | Bhadran | Mohanlal, Laya, Kalabhavan Mani |
| Bharathchandran I.P.S. | Ranji Panickar | Ranji Panickar | Suresh Gopi, Sai Kumar, Shreya Reddi |
| The Campus | Mohan | Cheriyan Kalpakavadi | Madhu Warrier, Eva Pavithran |
| By the People | Jayaraj | Sunil Parameswaran | Narain, Arun, Mangala |
| Maanikyan | K. K. Haridas | | Kalabhavan Mani, Nandhini |
| Chanthupottu | Laljose | Benny P. Nayarambalam | Dileep, Gopika, Biju Mneon, Indrajith, Bhavana, Lal |
| Naran | Joshiy | Ranjan Pramod | Mohanlal, Madhu, Siddique, Jagathy Sreekumar |
| Nerariyan CBI | K. Madhu | S. N. Swamy | Mammootty, Mukesh, Jishnu Raghavan |
| Lokanathan IAS | Anil | Biju Vattappara | Kalabhavan Mani, Gayathri Raghuram, Ranjith |
| Oraal | Kukku Surendran | | Mukesh, Shreya Reddi |
| Anandabhadram | Santhosh Sivan | Sunil Parameswaran | Prithviraj, Manoj K Jayan, Kalabhavan Mani, Kavya Madhavan, Biju Menon |
| Rajamanikyam | Anwar Rasheed | T. A. Shahid | Mammootty, Ranjith, Rahman, Sai Kumar, Padmapriya, Manoj K Jayan |
| Sarkkar Dada | Sasisankar | Mani Shornur | Jayaram, Navya Nair, Salim Kumar |
| Mayookham | Hariharan | Hariharan | Saiju Kurup, Mamta Mohandas |
| Boyy Friennd | Vinayan | J. Pallasery | Manikkuttan, Lakshmi Gopalaswami, Sreenivasan, Honey Rose |
| Seelabathi | R. Sarath | | Narain, Kavya Madhavan |
| December | Ashok R. Nath | | Manjulan, Aparna Pillai, Shamna Kasim |
| Thanmathra | Blessy | Blessy | Mohanlal, Meera Vasudev, Arjun Lal |
| The Tiger | Shaji Kailas | B. Unnikrishnan | Suresh Gopi, Gopika, Siddique |
| Bus Conductor | V. M. Vinu | T. A. Razaq | Mammootty, Jayasurya, Bhavana, Nikhitha |
| Maniyarakallan | Rajan P. Dev | | Harisree Ashokan, Vijayaraghavan, Jagadish |
| OK Chacko Cochin Mumbai | Aneesh Panicker | | Thilakan, Sai Kumar |
| Pass Pass | | | |
| Oru Punchiriyil | | | |
| Dhobiwala | | | |
| Mazhamukil Pole | | | |
| Nomparam | | | |
| Moksham | | | |
| Thampuraankunnu | | | |
| Bhoomikkoru Charamageetham | | | |

== Dubbed films ==
| Openings | Title | Director(s) | Original film | | Cast | Ref. |
| Openings | Title | Director(s) | Film | Language | Cast | Ref. |
|---|---|---|---|---|---|---|
| Manjupeyyum Munpe | Balakrishnan | | | | Meera Jasmine | |
| Aasai | Vasanth | Vasanth | | | | |
| Thiruvilayaadal | AP Nagarajan | AP Nagarajan | | | | |
| Gokulam | Vikraman | Vikraman | Gokulam | Tamil | Jayaram | |
| Brahmam | B Sreenu | | | | | |
