= Vijayaraghavan filmography =

List of films featuring Vijayaraghavan

The following is the filmography of Indian actor Vijayaraghavan.

== Filmography ==
=== 1970s ===
Year	Title	Role	Notes
1973	Kaapalika	Babu	
1975	Picnic		

=== 1980s ===
Year	Title	Role	Notes
1981	Ammakkorumma	Gopakumar	
1982	Innalenkil Nale		
1983	Aana		
1983	Surumaitta Kannukal	Abu	
1983	Pinnilavu	Wilson	
1985	Uyarum Njan Nadake	Raghu	
1985	Ee Sabdam Innathe Sabdam	Balu	
1986	Njan Kathorthirikkum		
1986	Manasiloru Manimuthu		
1987	P.C. 369	Isaac	
1987	Naradhan Keralathil	Khader	
1987	New Delhi	Ananthan	
1988	Witness	Usthad Hamsa	
1988	Moonnam Mura	Karunan	
1988	1921	Kandan Kutti / Muhammad	
1988	Puravrutham	Abu	
1988	Dhinarathrangal	Sasi	
1988	Oru CBI Diary Kurippu	Johny	
1988	New Delhi	Ananth	Hindi film
1989	The News	C. I. Freddy Issac	
1989	Naduvazhikal	Deputy Superintendent of Police	
1989	Ramji Rao Speaking	Ramji Rao	
1989	Miss Pamela		
1989	Swantham Ennu Karuthi		
1989	Kaalal Pada	Jaffer	
1989	Douthyam	Capt. Rajiv Kumar	
1989	Nair Saab	Rishi	
1989	Adikkurippu	Mohammed Ali	
1989	Mahayanam	Sunnychan	
1989	Pradeshika Varthakal	Ramu	

=== 1990s ===
Year	Title	Role	Notes
1990	Crime Branch	Babu	
1990	Prosecution		
1990	Purappadu		
1990	Arangetra Velai	Pakkiram	Tamil film
1990	Orukkam	Ramu	
1990	Nanma Niranjavan Srinivasan	Seythu	
1990	Nammude Naadu	Balan	
1990	Nagarangalil Chennu Raparkam	Devan	
1990	Indrajaalam	Thankappan	
1990	Dr. Pasupathy	Thomas	
1990	Appu	Ramankutty	
1990	Samrajyam	Khadir	
1991	Parallel College	Chandrashekharan Nair	
1991	Kadalora Kattu	Ponnappan	
1991	Onnaam Muhurtham	William Patrick Parera	
1991	Nettippattom	Sugunan	
1991	Thudar Katha	Sudhakaran	
1991	Nattu Vishesham	Vijayan	
1991	Oru Prathyeka Ariyippu	Vishnu	
1991	Kuttapathram	Sethu	
1991	Georgootty C/O Georgootty	Pappachan	
1991	Cheppu Kilukkunna Changathi	Ashok Kartha	
1992	Police Diary		
1992	Sathyaprathinja	Gopan	
1992	Maanyanmar	Gopi	
1992	Kaazhchakkppuram	Sethumadhavan	
1992	Ellarum Chollanu	Gopalakrishnan	
1992	Aardram	Madhavan	
1992	Vietnam Colony	Vattappalli	
1993	Sthalathe Pradhana Payyans	Jayapalan	
1993	Porutham		
1993	Meleparambil Anveedu	Gopikrishnan	
1993	Mafia	Sreeraman	
1993	Aagneyam	Mammali	
1993	Dhruvam	Ramdas	
1993	Ekalavyan	Cheradi Skariah	
1993	Bandhukkal Sathrukkal	Uthaman	
1994	Bhaagyavaan	Rahulan	
1994	Rudraksham	Jose	
1994	Kadal	Markose	
1994	Commissioner	Mohammad Iqbal	
1994	Chief Minister K. R. Gowthami	Adv. Anathan	
1994	Chukkan	Sreeni	
1994	Cabinet	Shivasankaran	
1995	Thumboli Kadappuram	Methrinju	
1995	Sipayi Lahala	M D Ramanathan	
1995	Three Men Army	Rajesh	Cameo Role
1995	Special Squad	Noufal	
1995	Radholsavam	Chandutty	
1995	Mannar Mathai Speaking	Ramji Rao	
1995	Highway	Moorthy / Unnithaan	
1995	Oru Abhibhashakante Case Diary	Balan	
1995	The King	Sanjay	
1996	Rajaputhran	Akbar	
1996	Sulthan Hyderali	Hydrali	
1996	Padanayakan	Pappan	
1996	Naalamkettile Nalla Thambimar	S.I Ramabhadran	
1996	Kanjirappally Kariachan	Sunny Kanjirappally	
1996	Harbour	Thommichan	
1997	Kudamattam	Sivan Kutti	
1997	Kottappurathe Koottukudumbam	Sahadevan	
1997	Adivaram	Adivaram	
1997	Shibiram		
1997	Kannoor	S.P Balachandran	
1997	Desadanam	Sankaran	
1997	Adukkala Rahasyam Angaadi Paattu	Josekutty	
1998	Poothiruvathiranalil		
1998	Mangamma	Balan	
1998	Manthri Kochamma		Guest Role
1998	Aalibabayum Aarara Kallanmarum	Sub Inspector Jayashankar	
1998	Harthal		
1998	Dravidan	Rarichan	
1998	British Market	Maadu Vareed	
1999	Tokyo Nagarathile Viseshangal	Kadappuram Karunan	
1999	Rishi Vamsam		
1999	Gandhiyan	Captain Bharathan Menon	
1999	Panchapandavar	Balan	
1999	Independence	Sinkaramuthu & P. Raveedran I.A.S	
1999	Crime File	Fr. Clement Kaliyar	
1999	Bharya Veettil Paramasukham	Ramankutti	
1999	Red Indians	DYSP Ravisankar	

=== 2000s ===
Year	Title	Role	Notes
2000	Kattu Vannu Vilichappol	Abu	
2001	Jeevan Masai	Doctor	
2001	Neythukaran		
2001	Raavanaprabhu	Mundackal Rajendran	
2001	Chithrathoonukal	CI Sarathchandra Varma	
2001	Fort Kochi		
2001	Praja	Devadevan Nambiar (DD)	
2001	Dany	Robert	
2002	Savithriyude Aranjanam	Karunan	
2002	Kayamkulam Kanaran		
2002	Swarna Medal	Martin	
2002	Njan Rajavu	Thomas Scaria	
2002	Kakke Kakke Koodevide	Chellappan	
2002	Nizhalkuthu	Jailor	
2002	Chathurangam	P. P. Paulose	
2003	Stop Violence	Gunda Stephen	
2003	Kalavarkey		
2003	Swantham Malavika		
2003	Achante Kochumolu	Samuel Issac	
2003	Uthara	Chellappan	
2003	C.I.D. Moosa	D.I.G Sathyanarayanan	
2003	The King Maker Leader	Ramachandra Prasad	
2003	War and Love	Captain Vijayan	
2003	Hariharan Pillai Happy Aanu	Dilip Kumar	
2003	Ammakilikkoodu	Rajan	
2003	Malsaram	Thommichan	
2004	Koottu	Akbar	
2004	Wanted	Nambyar	
2004	Mayilattam	Police Officer	
2004	Vacation	D'Cruz	
2004	Natturajavu	Sunnychan	
2004	Kadhavaseshan	Janardanan	
2005	Ullam	Master	
2005	Kalyana Kurimanam	Mukunthan	
2005	Kochi Rajavu	Karimparakkal Prabhakaran	
2005	Ben Johnson	Viswanathan MLA	
2005	Rappakal	Janardana Varma	
2005	Pauran	Bhargavan	
2005	Bharathchandran I.P.S.	Thomas Chacko	
2006	Lion	Vijayan	
2006	Vargam	Iritty Vavachan	
2006	Kilukkam Kilukilukkam	Krishnadas	
2006	Rashtram	Medayil Chaandi	
2006	Thuruppugulan	DGP Varma	
2006	Chacko Randaaman	Karimbadam Devanarayanan	
2006	Chess	Devarajan	
2006	Red Salute	Bapputty Haji	
2006	Mouryan		
2007	Avan Chandiyude Makan	Chandi	
2007	Inspector Garud	Karaikudi Arumukha Chettiyar	
2007	Mayavi	Thottappally Surendran	
2007	Sketch	Alexander Nambadan	
2007	Speed Track	Chandradas	
2007	Vinodayathra	Rajappan	
2007	Chotta Mumbai	Mohandas	
2007	Big B	CI George	
2007	July 4	Gopalan	
2007	Sooryan	Simon Thekkilakkadan	
2007	Naalu Pennungal		
2007	Nasrani	M. C. Paul	
2008	Roudram	Pattakkalil Purushothaman Pillai / Appichayi	
2008	Kanal Kannadi		
2008	Innathe Chintha Vishayam	Pithambaran	
2008	Oru Pennum Randaanum	Police Inspector	Segment: Niyamavum Neethiyum
2008	Sultan	Shivasankara Pilla	
2008	Twenty:20	Balan	
2009	Red Chillies	Colonel / Headmaster	
2009	Hailesa	Valamkadi Madhavan	
2009	I. G. – Inspector General	DYSP George Varghese	
2009	Black Dalia	IG Mathew K. John	
2009	Ee Pattanathil Bhootham	ACP Neelakantan IPS	
2009	Daddy Cool	DYSP Varghese	
2009	Puthiya Mukham	Shivaraman	
2009	Samayam		
2009	Kana Kanmani	Stephen	
2009	Decent Parties		
2009	Swantham Lekhakan	Shreedharan	
2009	Angel John	James Kuruvilla	
2009	Patham Nilayile Theevandi	Ayyappan	
2009	Chattambinadu	Mallanchira Unnithan	

=== 2010s ===
Year	Title	Role	Notes
2010	Thanthonni	Kochouseppu & Thankachan	
2010	Janakan	City Police Commissioner	
2010	Kadaksham		
2010	Chithrakkuzhal		
2010	Nayakan	William Thomas	
2010	Brahmasthram	MLA Vasudevan	
2010	Chithrakuzhal	Forest Ranger	
2010	Pokkiri Raja	'Kaavi' Krishnan	
2010	Alexander the Great		
2010	Elsamma Enna Aankutty	Karippalli Sugunan	
2010	The Thriller	Sadhasivan	
2010	Marykkundoru Kunjaadu	Geevarghese	
2011	Arjunan Saakshi	CI Sebastian	
2011	Snehadaram		
2011	Aazhakadal	Paulakandathil Vakkachan Tharakan	
2011	Ithu Nammude Katha		
2011	Maharaja Talkies	Pappachan	
2011	Christian Brothers	Kunnel Kumaran Thampi	
2011	Seniors	Alavudheen Rowther	
2011	The Filmstaar	Appayi	
2011	Salt N' Pepper	Balakrishnan, Archaeology Dept.	
2011	Violin	Simon	
2011	Doctor Love		
2011	Vellaripravinte Changathi	Editor K.Sankunni	
2011	Venicile Vyapari	Chungathara Raghavan	
2012	Asuravithu	Abbaji	
2012	Achante Aanmakkal	Koyikkal Keshavadas	
2012	Idiots	Beeran	
2012	Kunjaliyan	Remanan	
2012	Masters	Balagangadharan	
2012	Mayamohini	Appukuttan Nair	
2012	Josettante Hero	Jose	
2012	Vaadhyar		
2012	MLA Mani: Patham Classum Gusthiyum	Vattakkadan Varkey	
2012	Friday	Police Officer	
2012	Run Babby Run	SP Somarajan IPS	
2012	Thappana	Police Officer John George	
2012	Vaidooryam		
2012	101 Weddings	Munshi Sankaran Pillai	
2012	Face 2 Face	Varghese Punchakkadan	
2013	Romans	Fr. Gabriel	
2013	Kutteem Kolum	Madhava Menon	
2013	Sound Thoma	Shankaran Bhagavathar	
2013	Housefull	Cherukkappan	
2013	ABCD	K. P. Ravi Varma	
2013	Left Right Left	Comrade S.R.	
2013	Memories	IG Aravindhaksha Menon IPS	
2013	For Sale	Achayan	
2013	Blackberry		
2013	Musical Chair		
2013	Daivathinte Swantham Cleetus	Simon	
2013	Nadodimannan	Mayor Purushothaman	
2013	72 Model	Vasutty	
2013	Ginger		
2013	Maad Dad	Krishnettan	
2013	Idukki Gold	Raman	
2013	Ezhu Sundara Rathrikal	City Police Commissioner Varghese	
2014	Mannar Mathai Speaking 2	Ramji Rao (Pastor Kunjumon)	
2014	Ettekaal Second	Sandeeps' father	
2014	Salaam Kashmier	Peter	
2014	Ohm Shanthi Oshaana	Tomichan	
2014	Ring Master	Prince's father	
2014	Polytechnic	Sukumaran Nair	
2014	Bangalore Days	Kuttan's father	
2014	Bhaiyya Bhaiyya	Vedipparambil Varkey	
2014	Darboni		
2014	You can do		
2014	8:20		
2014	To Let Ambadi Talkies		
2014	Nagara Varidhi Naduvil Njan	Mayooranathan	
2015	Oru Vadakkan Selfie	Umesh's father	
2015	Samrajyam II	Khadir	
2015	Jilebi	Chandradas	
2015	Avarude Veedu		
2015	White Boys		
2015	The Samsthanam		
2015	Kukkiliyaar		
2015	One Second Please		
2015	Sir C. P.	Sharadi Maash	
2015	Vishwasam... Athallae Ellaam	Divakaran	
2015	Loham	Chandrasekharan	
2015	Two Countries	Kochachan	
2016	Leela	Gopinathan Pillai Nair/ Pillechan	
2016	Style	Tom and Jerry's father	
2016	James & Alice	Dr. Mohan	
2016	Sahapadi 1975		
2016	Oru Muthassi Gadha	Anil Sir	
2016	Shajahanum Pareekuttiyum	Colonel Stephen	
2016	Pinneyum		
2016	Maayamaalika		
2017	Bairavaa	Vaishali's father	Tamil film
2017	Ezra	Fr. Samuel	
2017	Sathya		
2017	Rakshadhikari Baiju Oppu	Balakrishnan	
2017	Ramaleela	Ambady Mohanan	
2017	Sherlock Toms	Unnikrishnan	
2017	Tharangam	Menon	
2017	Punyalan Private Limited	Shakthan Rajashekharan	
2017	Aana Alaralodalaral	Stalin Prabhakaran	
2018	Carbon	M. D.	
2018	Queen	Principal	
2018	Rosapoo	Velayudhan	
2018	Kammara Sambhavam	Francis	
2018	Aravindante Athidhikal	Kaala Prabhakaran	
2018	Oru Pazhaya Bomb Kadha	Palathara Jose	
2018	Mangalyam Thanthunanena	Avarachan	
2018	Johny Johny Yes Appa	Karian	
2018	Ottakoru Kaamukan	Paulose	
2018	Paviyettante Madhurachooral		
2018	Karinkannan		
2019	Mr. & Ms. Rowdy	Fr. Pulikodan	
2019	Soothrakkaran	Panambil Prabhakaran	
2019	Mask	Ramji Rao	
2019	Madhura Raja	Kunnath Krishnan Nair	
2019	Kakshi: Amminippilla	Adv. R. P.	
2019	Porinju Mariam Jose	Iype Muthalali	
2019	Brother's Day	Kurishinkal Chandy	
2019	Adhyarathri	Narayanan Maashu	
2019	Driving Licence	Himself	Cameo

=== 2020s ===
Year	Title	Role	Notes
2020	2 States	Appappan	
2020	Maniyarayile Ashokan	Achuthan	
2021	Paappan	SP Bhaskar Shenoy IPS	
2021	Kurup	Shivashankaran Pillai	
2022	Kallan D`Souza	DYSP Abraham	
2022	Sayanna Varthakal	Varghese	
2022	Hridayam	Neelakandan Moorthy	
2022	Naradan	Babuji	
2022	Kaduva	M.L.A. Divakara Kurup	
2023	Oh My Darling	Alex	
2023	Pookkaalam	Ittoop	
2023	Ayalvaashi	Barkath	
2023	Neymar	Chackola	
2023	Kirkkan	Kurian	
2023	Voice of Sathyanathan	Anto	
2023	Pappachan Olivilanu	Mathachan	
2023	Jaladhara Pumpset Since 1962	Chandran Mash	
2023	Kannur Squad	SP Krishnalal T. K.	
2023	Antony	Avaran	
2024	Kishkindha Kaandam	K. Appu Pillai	
2024	Oru Kattil Oru Muri		
2024	Rifle Club	Kuzhiveli Lonappan	
2025	Daveed	Raghavan Aashaan	
2025	Ouseppinte Osyath	Ousep	
2025	Paranu Paranu Paranu Chellan	Kokkav	
2025	Lokah Chapter 1: Chandra	Dr. Verghese Kurien	
2025	Vala: Story of a Bangle	Soopika	
2025	Dheeram		
2025	Aghosham	Mathews Eapen	
2026	Juniors Journey		
2026	Pallichattambi	Fr. Pulamplaavil	
2026	Ananthan Kaadu	K. K. Menon	Malayalam-Tamil bilingual film
2026	I, Nobody	CM Karthikeyan	
2026	Pradhama Drishtiya Kuttakkar †	TBA	
2026	Ottam Thullal †	TBA	

=== Web series ===
Year	Title	Role	Notes	Ref.
2024	Perilloor Premier League	Purushottaman	Disney+ Hotstar	
2025	The Chronicles of the 4.5 Gang		SonyLIV	
