= Nair (disambiguation) =

The Nair are a group of Indian Hindu castes.

Nair may also refer to:

- Nair (hair removal), a hair removal product
- National Academy of Indian Railways (NAIR), Vadodara, Gujarat, India

== Places ==
=== Islands ===
- Nair (Mauritania)

=== Lakes ===
- Lai Nair, Graubünden, Switzerland
- Lej Nair (Bernina), Switzerland
- Lej Nair (Silvaplana), Switzerland

=== Mountains ===
- Piz Nair, Albula Alps in Switzerland
- Piz Nair (Glarus Alps), Switzerland
- Piz Nair (Sesvenna Alps), Switzerland

== People with the given name ==
- Nair Bello, Brazilian actress
- Nair de Teffé, Brazilian cartoonist
- Nair José da Silva, Brazilian footballer

== People with the surname ==
- Anita Nair (born 1966), Indian English-language writer
- Anusree (full name, Anusree Nair)
- Arjun Nair, Australian cricketer
- Balan K. Nair, actor
- Billy Nair, South African politician
- Devan Nair, 3rd President of Singapore
- Karun Nair (born 1991), Indian cricketer
- K. K. Nair, Kerala politician
- Mira Nair, film director
- M. T. Vasudevan Nair, Indian author
- Navya Nair, actress
- Preethi Nair, author
- Ramankutty Nair, Kathakali dancer
- Sami Nair, French politician
- S. Jayachandran Nair (1939–2025), Indian journalist, writer, and screenwriter
- S R Nair, entrepreneur
- V. Madhusoodhanan Nair, Indian poet
- Vinita Nair, journalist
- V. K. B. Nair, police officer
- V. Parmeswaran Nair, physicist

== See also ==
- Nair-san (disambiguation)
- Alnair (disambiguation), the name of two stars
- McNair, a surname
- Nayar (disambiguation)
  - Nayar (name), an Indian surname of Punjab origin
