= Thulli Vilayadu =

2013 Indian film by Vincent Selva

- Theatrical release poster
- Directed by: Vincent Selva
- Written by: Screenplay & Dialogues: Thirumalai Kishore; Sasidharan
- Story by: Vincent Selva
- Produced by: D. Govindaraj
- Starring: Yuvaraj; Deepthi Nambiar; Prakash Raj; Jayaprakash; Soori; Sendrayan
- Cinematography: S. K. Boopathy
- Edited by: V. T. Vijayan
- Music by: Srikanth Deva
- Production company: RB Studios
- Release date: 28 June 2013
- Country: India
- Language: Tamil

Thulli Vilayadu is a 2013 Tamil-language comedy thriller film co-written and directed by Vincent Selva. The film stars Yuvaraj, Deepthi Nambiar, Prakash Raj, Jayaprakash, Soori, and Sendrayan. Srikanth Deva has scored the music.

== Plot ==
Raghu, Mano, and Thangavelu are faithful for politicians Singam and Samipillai. Both politicians are fighting for 200 million rupees, which is meant to be used to bribe the people for the upcoming elections. in the meantime, the three men decide to jump in this and take it for their advantage. The men decide to go to Rajasthan to hide. On their trip, they meet a girl named Yamuna, who is claimed to be Asin's younger sister. What is the next part of the chapter?

== Cast ==
- Yuvaraj as Raghu
- Deepthi Nambiar as Yamuna
- Prakash Raj as Singam
- Jayaprakash as Samipillai
- Soori as Mano
- Sendrayan as Thangavelu
- Singamuthu
- Manobala
- Madhan Bob
- Sujatha
- Rajendranath
- Bava Lakshmanan
- Madurai Muthu
- Yogi Ram
- Ankitha as an item number

== Production ==
The film was shot for 35 days mostly in North India with Vincent Selva canning five scenes a day. Deepthi Nambiar shot for the film alongside Thuppakki (2012) and the Malayalam film Cherukkanum Pennum (2025).

== Soundtrack ==
The soundtrack is composed by Srikanth Deva, collaborating with Vincent Selva for the fourth time. Director Mysskin, who earlier worked as an assistant director for Vincent Selva, had sung one of the songs. The audio was launched on 8 March 2013.

Song	Singers	Lyrics
"Ammadi Aathadi"	Mysskin	Kabilan
"Sandi Kuthira"	Renuka	Pon. Ravindran
"Theme Music"	Instrumental	
"Vaa Machi Oothiko"	Benny Dayal	Na. Muthukumar
"Yaar Ivalo"	Krish	Na. Muthukumar

== Release and reception ==
The film was released on 28 June 2013 alongside Annakodi. The New Indian Express wrote, "lacklustre characters, insipid narration and shoddy screenplay make the film devoid of thrill, humour or excitement".
