= Ullam =

Ullam (lit. 'soul') may refer to these Indian films:

- Ullam (2005 film), a Malayalam-language film directed by M. K. Sukumaran, starring Suresh Gopi and Geethu Mohandas
- Ullam (2012 film), a Tamil-language film directed by Arunmoorthy, starring Mithun Tejaswi and Priyamani
