= Preethi (name) =

Preethi is a name primarily used in India. Notable people with the name include:

- Preethi Asrani (born 1999), Indian actress in Telugu and Tamil films and television
- Preethi Nair (born 1971), British author of Indian heritage
- Preethi Pal (born 2001), Indian para athlete
- Preethi Sharma, Indian actress in Tamil and Telugu television
- Preethi Srinivasan (born 1979) Indian cricketer for Tamil Nadu
- Preethi Varma, Indian actress in Tamil cinema
- Radhika Preethi (born 1997), Indian actress in Tamil films and television
