= Aravindan Puraskaram =

Film award for best debutant director in India

- Description: Award for the best debutant director in Indian languages
- Country: India
- Presented by: Kerala Chalachitra Film Society

Aravindan Puraskaram (Aravindan Award) is an award instituted in 1991 in the memory of iconic Malayalam filmmaker G. Aravindan for the best debutant director in Indian languages. The award comprises Rs. 25,000, a memento and a citation. The award is facilitated by Kerala Chalachitra Film Society. The award is presented on March 15 every year on the death anniversary of Aravindan, who is considered one of the pioneers of parallel cinema in Malayalam.

== Recipients ==
List of award recipients
Year	Recipient	Film	Language	Ref.
1999	Shyamaprasad	Agnisakshi	Malayalam	
2000	Kavitha Lankesh	Deveeri	Kannada	
2001	P. Sheshadri	Munnudi	Kannada	
2004	Anup Kurian	Manasarovar	English	
2005	Alberrt Antoni	Kanne Madanguka	Malayalam	
2009	Atanu Ghosh	Angshumaner Chhobi	Bengali	
2010	Nila Madhab Panda	I am Kalam	Hindi	
2012	Kamal KM	I.D.	Hindi	
2015	Bauddhayan Mukherji	Teenkahon	Bengali	
2016	P. S. Manu	Mundrothuruth	Malayalam	
2017	Sagar Chaya Vanchari	Redu	Marathi	
2018	Zakariya Mohammed	Sudani from Nigeria	Malayalam	
2019	Madhu C. Narayanan	Kumbalangi Nights	Malayalam	
2021	Sanu John Varghese	Aarkkariyam	Malayalam	
2022	Brijesh Chandhra Tangi	#Viral World	Telugu	
