= Vaadamalli =

- Directed by: Alberrt Antoni
- Written by: Rajesh Varma; Lasar Shine
- Story by: Alberrt Antoni
- Produced by: Sunil Chandrika Nair
- Starring: Rahul Madhav; Ramesh Raveendran; Pradeep Chandran; Richa Panai; Niji Mary; Jyothi Chatterji; Bijukuttan; Raveendran
- Cinematography: Vaidy S. Pillai
- Edited by: Raja Muhamed
- Music by: Shyam Balakrishnan
- Production company: Zoe Estebe Moviez
- Distributed by: Zoe Estebe Moviez Release through Maaxlab
- Release date: 10 June 2011
- Country: India
- Language: Malayalam

Vaadamalli is a 2011 Indian Malayalam thriller film directed by Alberrt Antoni after his critically acclaimed debut film Kanne Madanguka.

The film was shot at various locations in Kochi, Alappuzha, Munnar, Athirapally and Thrissur.

Vaadamalli was produced by Sunil Chandrika Nair under the banner of Zoe Estebe Moviez.

== Plot ==
The title symbolizes everlasting love and is set in the backdrop of a music college. It tells the story of a student named Vasu, who hails from a slum. The people in the slum sponsor his education. Vrindha Nambiar comes from a rich family and she falls in love with Vasu. The story takes a dramatic turn when a girl goes missing from the college hostel. The clues to her whereabouts emerge when various students narrate their versions of the events. The Police officer finds that a girl took obscene pictures of Vrinda.

== Cast ==
- Rahul Madhav as Vasu
- Pradeep Chandran as Brother/Police Officer
- Ramesh Raveendran as Sandesh
- Richa Panai as Vrindha Nambiar
- Niji Mary
- Jyothi Chatterji
- Biju Kuttan
- Raveendran
- Lintu Thomas as Vrindha's friend

== Soundtrack ==
Vaadamalli

Soundtrack album by Shyam Balakrishnan
- Released: 2011
- Genre: Soundtrack
- Length: 25:11 mins
- Label: Satyam Audios
- Producer: Shyam Bakakrishnan

The songs of this movie were composed by Shyam Balakrishnan, with lyrics by Vayalar Sarath Chandra Varma.

Track	Song	Singer(s)	Duration
1	"Neeyo Mazha"	K. K. Nishad, Neetha Subhir	4:42
2	"Tumanjin"	K. S. Chithra, U. Krish	4:36
3	"Anuragam"	Surmukhi Raman, K. K. Nishad	4:16
4	"Rapukalude"	Surmukhi Raman, P. G. Ragesh	3:52
5	"Neeyo"	Neetha Subhir	4:40
6	"Guitar Solo"		3:16
7	"Violin Solo"		1:09

== Release ==
Rediff gave the film one out of five stars and wrote that "On the whole, Vaadamalli is, to put it mildly, inane".
