= Crossroad (film) =

Indian Malayalam-language anthology film

- Crossroad
- Directed by: Lenin Rajendran; Madhupal; Nemom Pushparaj; Pradeep Nair; Babu Thiruvalla; Ashok R. Nath; Sashi Paravur; Avira Rebecca; Nayana Suryan; Alberrt Antoni
- Written by: Jayaraj; Lenin Rajendran; Sashi Paravoor; Babu Thiruvalla; Nelson Alex
- Produced by: Baby Mathew; Anil Ambalakkara; Udayakumar; Parthan Mohan; Chandramohan; Bobin Karimkutty; Nas Nazar
- Starring: Cast
- Cinematography: Madhu Ambat; M. J. Radhakrishnan; Azhagappan; K. G. Jayan; Prathap P. Nair; Sunil Prem; Nikhil S. Praveen; Gowtham Lenin
- Edited by: Mahesh Narayan; Raja Mohammed; Pradeep Shankar; Jith Joshie; Karthik Jogesh; C.R.Sreejith; Abhilash Viswanath; Sandeep Nandhakumar; Sujesh S.
- Music by: Sooraj S. Kurup; M. Jayachandran; Bijibal; Ramesh Narayan; Jayan V. Pisharody; Amrutha Suresh; Abhirami Suresh; Ajay Thilak; Anitha Shaiq
- Production company: Forum For Better Films
- Release date: 13 October 2017
- Running time: 150 minutes
- Country: India
- Language: Malayalam

Crossroad is a 2017 Indian Malayalam-language anthology film comprising 10 stories. It is a portmanteau movie celebrating womanhood and tells the story of ten women. The movie encompasses ten featurette films of fifteen minutes each. The movie showcases each vibrant and variant facet of a Woman and tells the story from her perspective.

== Plot ==
Pakshikalude Manam: Mythili portrays a bird photographer whose life motto is to see (and seemingly photograph) a rare bird called Aphrodite. The bird has feathers colored like a rainbow and the photographer goes to the forest to see it, against her husband's wish. Will she be able to see the bird forms the crux of the story.

== List of short films ==
| Short film | Director | Cinematographer | Writer | Music director |
|---|---|---|---|---|
| Oru Raathriyude Kooli | Madhupal | Pratap P. Nair | P. F. Mathew | Bijibal |
| Kaaval | Neemom Pushparaj | Alagappan N. | Salin Mankuzhy | Ramesh Narayan |
| Pakshikalude Maanam | Nayana Sooryan | Gowtham Lenin | Nayana Sooryan | Ajay Thilak |
| Mounam | Babu Thiruvalla | M. J. Radhakrishnan | Babu Thiruvalla | Bijibal |
| Badar | Ashok R. Nath | Sunil Prem | Rajesh K. R. | Viswajith |
| Mudra | Alberrt Antoni | Sadat | Alberrt Antoni | Jayan V. Pisharody |
| Lake House | Sasi Paravoor | K. G. Jayan | Sasi Paravoor | M. Jayachandran |
| Kodeshyan | Pradeep Nair | Nikhil S. Praveen | Jayaraj | Sooraj S. Kurup |
| Chrerivu | Avira Rebecca | M. J. Radhakrishnan | Nelson Alex | Bijibal |
| Pinpe Nadappaval | Lenin Rajendran | Madhu Ambat | Lenin Rajendran | Anitha Shaiq |

== Cast ==
=== Oru Raathriyude Kooli ===
- Padmapriya Janakiraman as Seema
- V. K. Baiju as a villager
- Suryakanth Udayakumar as The man met with accident

=== Kaaval ===
- Priyanka Nair as Devi
- Roslin as Devi's neighbour
- Shibu Laban as Sabu, the meter reader
- Pranav Nair as Devi's child
- Pradeesh Nair as Devi's husband
- Neemom Pushparaj as a person in the shop

=== Pakshikalude Maanam ===
- Mythili as the bird photographer
- Vijay Babu as the Husband, Joe
- Gangadhara Menon as the birdwatcher
- Sidhartha Siva as Tommy, the resort owner
- Chethan Jayalal as informer

=== Mounam ===
- Manasa Radhakrishnan as Sally
- Seema G. Nair as Mariyamma, Sally's Mother
- Anu Mohan as Jomon, Sally's love interest

=== Badar ===
- Mamta Mohandas as Badarunneesa
- Babu Annur as Madhavan Nair
- Kochu Preman as Ulahannan, Madhavan's friend
- Kailash as Unni, Madhavan's son

=== Mudra ===
- Isha Talwar as Gaya Parameshwaran
- Anjali Nair as Padmavathi
- Poojappura Radhakrishnan as Gaya's personal assistant

=== Lake House ===
- Richa Panai as Aimy
- Rahul Madhav as Aimy's husband
- Shobha Mohan as Aimy's mother in law

=== Kodeshyan ===
- Punnasserry Kanchana as Thresyama
- Chinnu Kuruvilla as Kunjumol, Thresyama's daughter

=== Chrerivu ===
- Srinda Arhaan as the passenger in the taxi
- Manoj K. Jayan as the taxi driver

=== Pinpe Nadappaval ===
- Anjana Chandran as the wife
- Joy Mathew as the drama director
- Sagar as the husband

== Soundtrack ==
The film features original songs composed by Amrutha Suresh and Abhirami Suresh, Anitha Shaiq and M. Jayachandran.

Crossroad
| No. | Title | Lyrics | Music | Singer(s) | Length |
|---|---|---|---|---|---|
| 1. | "Veerangana" | Avira Rebecca | Amrutha Suresh, Abhirami Suresh | Amrutha Suresh, Abhirami Suresh | 3:32 |
| 2. | "Melakey" | Rafeeq Ahamed | Shweta Mohan | Shweta Mohan | 4:47 |
| 3. | "Oru Vela" | M. R. Jayageetha | M. Jayachandran | M. Jayachandran | 4:12 |
| 4. | "Makane" | Jayan C. Nair | M. Jayachandran | M. Jayachandran | 2:15 |
| 5. | "Nama Sametham – Dimthana" | M. R. Jayageetha | M. Jayachandran, Abhirami Ajai | M. Jayachandran, Abhirami Ajai | 1:58 |

== Release ==
=== Critical reception ===
The Times of India rated 3 out of 5 stars. Sify rated 3.5 out of 5 stars.
