= Rahul Madhav =

Indian actor (born 1984)

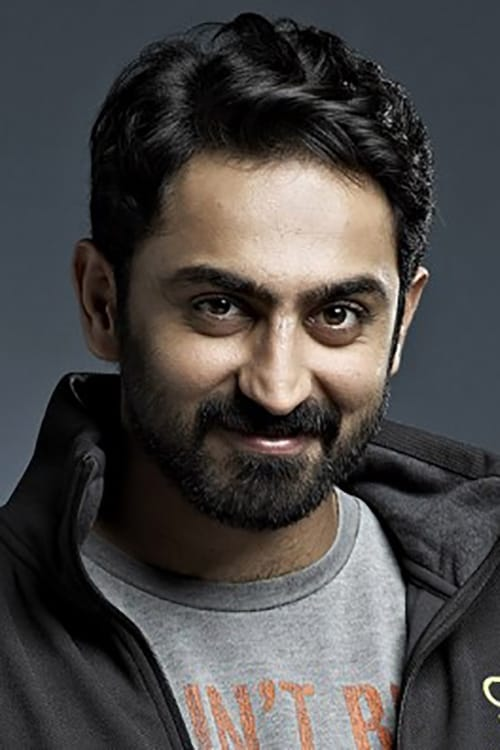
- Born: Ernakulam, Kerala, India
- Occupation: Actor
- Years active: 2009–present

Rahul Madhav is an Indian actor who works in Malayalam and Tamil films, along with a few Kannada films. His notable films include Vaadamalli, Thani Oruvan, Memories and 100 Days of Love.

== Career ==
He made his debut with the Tamil film, Adhe Neram Adhe Idam. He would go on to play the lead role in his next Tamil film, Yugam. He made his Malayalam film debut in Bangkok Summer.

He gained recognition in his next film, Vaadamalli, where he played a student who comes from the slums and his people from the slums sponsor his education. Later, he and Richa Panai were paired for the third time in a film which failed to take off.

He got a breakthrough in his acting career after playing the lead role in Lisammayude Veedu, which released in 2013. He played the character of Sivankutty while Meera Jasmine was paired opposite him. Actor Prithviraj Sukumaran suggested his name to director Jeethu Joseph who cast him in his film, Memories. His role in Thani Oruvan was well received.

Rahul made his Kannada film debut with Kiragorina Gayyaligalu (2016) and Telugu film debut with Geethanjali Malli Vachindi (2024).

== Filmography ==
Key
†	Denotes films that have not yet been released

Year	Title	Role	Notes
2011	Bangkok Summer	Sreehari	
2011	Vaadamalli	Vasu	
2011	Happy Durbar	Nelson	
2012	Crime Story	Sachin	
2012	Track	Jo Zacharia	
2013	Lisammayude Veedu	Shivankutty/Arjun	
2013	Memories	Sanju	
2014	Medulla Oblongata	Chandu	
2014	Alice A True Story	Melvin	
2014	Mr. Fraud	Sudhakara Varma	
2015	100 Days of Love	Rahul	
2015	8 March	Michael	
2015	Kaaval	Sabari	Short film
2016	Kadhantharam	Sidharth	
2016	Shyam	Shyam	
2016	Kattappanayile Hrithik Roshan	Giridhar	
2017	Munthirivallikal Thalirkkumbol	Josemon	
2017	Adventures of Omanakuttan	Sidharth Iyer	
2017	Tiyaan	Anil Raghavan	
2017	Adam Joan	Alan Pothen	
2017	Crossroad	Husband of Air Hostess	Segment: Lake house
2017	Zacharia Pothen Jeevichirippundu	Unnikrishnan	
2018	Aami	Imaginary friend	Cameo appearance
2018	Naam	Anil Kumar	
2018	Velakkariyaayi Irunnalum Nee Enn Mohavally		
2018	Ente Mezhuthiri Athazhangal	Adhi Menon	
2018	Neeli	Alex	
2018	Vallikkudilile Vellakkaran	Abhilash	
2018	Autorsha	Manu	
2019	9	James	
2019	An International Local Story	Rahul	
2019	Porinju Mariam Jose	Prince	
2021	Lalbagh	Tarun	
2021	My Dear Machans	Kannan	
2022	12th Man	Sam	
2022	Son of Alibaba - Naalpathonnaman	Robber	
2022	SantaCruz	ACP Eswar Das	
2022	Kaduva	Fr. Robin Poovampara	
2022	Paappan	Ravi Varman	
2022	Kumari	Jayan	
2022	Shefeekkinte Santhosham	Ajith Rangan	
2023	Jawanum Mullapoovum	Sajan Peter	
2023	Section 306 IPC		
2023	Abyuham	Dennis Joseph	
2023	Samara	Azad	
2023	Thaal		
2023	King of Kotha	Nikhil	
2024	Palayam PC	Lawrence	
2024	Hunt		
2024	Porrattu Nadakam	Kiran	Bilingual film
2024	Tharayam	Rahim	
2025	Mr & Mrs Bachelor		

=== Other languages ===
Year	Title	Role	Language	Ref.
2009	Adhe Neram Adhe Idam	Siva	Tamil	Debut film
2012	Yugam	Shiva	Tamil	
2015	Thani Oruvan	Janardhan IPS	Tamil	
2016	Kiragoorina Gayyaligalu		Kannada	
2017	Kaafi Thota	Chami	Kannada	
2022	21 Hours	Vishal Nair	Kannada	
2023	D3	Vinay	Tamil	
2024	Ayalaan	Aryan's henchman	Tamil	
2024	Geethanjali Malli Vachindi	Vishnu	Telugu	
2024	Porattu Nadakam	Kiran	Malayalam	
