= Yugam (film) =

2012 Tamil film by Sri Pavan Shekhar

- DVD cover
- Directed by: Sri Pavan Shekhar
- Written by: Sri Pavan Shekhar
- Produced by: G. Ravikumar; P. Poongodi
- Starring: Rahul Madhav; Deepthi Nambiar
- Cinematography: Sri Pavan Sekar
- Edited by: G. B. Venkatesh
- Music by: Ponraj
- Production company: ACE Entertainment
- Release date: 3 August 2012
- Country: India
- Language: Tamil

Yugam (transl. Eon) is a 2012 Indian Tamil-language thriller film written and directed by Sri Pavan Shekhar and starring Rahul Madhav and Deepthi Nambiar.

== Cast ==
- Rahul Madhav as Shiva
- Deepthi Nambiar as Pooja
- Ravi Mariya as Police Inspector
- Pandu
- Siva Narayana Murthy
- Bava Lakshmanan as "Master" Mani
- Muthukaalai
- Halwa Vasu as Restaurant waiter
- Pawan Kumar
- Senthil
- Jaymani
- Ramesh

== Production ==
Sri Pavan Shekhar, the cinematographer of Aasai Aasaiyai (2003), Sindhanai Sei and Adhe Neram Adhe Idam (both 2009), made his directorial debut through this film.

== Soundtrack ==
Music by Ponraj and lyrics written by Lalithanand.

- "Andru Oru Naalil"
- "Monisha Monisha"

== Reception ==
A critic from The Times of India gave the film a rating of one out of five stars and opined that "The film is full of badly-staged scenes that are further made insufferable by the overpowering background score, poor cinematography (that gives it the feel of a dated TV serial) and a climax that is perhaps the film’s one and only — and unintended — joke". Malini Mannath of The New Indian Express wrote that "'Yugam' has an unusual plot, intriguing at times. But a taut screenplay and a more focused narration could have made it an engaging thriller".
