= St. Xavier's College, Thumba =

College in Kerala, India

Coordinates: 8°33′33.86″N 76°51′1.25″E

- Former names: Loyola Junior College (1964-1966)
- Motto: Asatho Ma Sadgamaya
- Motto in English: From every evil, lead me to good.
- Type: Aided College
- Established: 1964; 62 years ago
- Religious affiliation: Roman Catholic (Jesuit)
- Academic affiliations: University of Kerala; University Grants Commission (India)
- Rector: Dr.Fr.Sunny Jose SJ
- Principal: Dr. Nisha Rani D
- Faculty: 52
- Location: Thumba, Thiruvananthapuram, Kerala, India
- Campus: Sub-Urban
- Patron saint: St. Francis Xavier
- Website: St. Xavier’s College, Thumba

St. Xavier's College, Thumba, was founded by the Jesuits in 1964, and is affiliated with the University of Kerala. It awards nine undergraduate degrees and two postgraduate degree.

== History ==
Founded in 1964, in 1965 the College was shifted to its present site in Thumba, a suburb of Thiruvananthapuram which is the capital of Kerala. The College was upgraded in 1977 when co-education began. In 2005 it became a Post Graduate College with the addition of an M.Sc. in physics.

== Academics ==
- Bachelor of Science (B.Sc.) in physics, chemistry, mathematics, and Botany & Biotechnology
- Bachelor of Arts (B.A.) in economics, history, Malayalam with mass communication and English with Media Studies
- Bachelor of Commerce (B.Com.)
- Master of Commerce
- Master of Science (M.Sc.) in physics.

== Notable alumni ==
- Prem Kumar, Actor
- Alexander Jacob (police officer)
- Jacob Punnoose, Director General of Police of Kerala
- S R Nair, Entrepreneur
- V. K. Prasanth, Member of Kerala Legislative Assembly
- Alencier Ley Lopez, Malayalam Actor
- Antony Raju, MLA

== Popular culture ==
- Velipadinte Pusthakam

== See also ==
- List of Jesuit sites
