= Nair-san =

Nair-san may refer to:

- A. M. Nair, Indian freedom fighter
- Nair-san (film), film based on him
