= Deepthi Nambiar =

Indian film actress

- Occupation: Actress
- Years active: 2009–2013

Deepthi Nambiar is a former Indian actress, who worked in Tamil and Malayalam films.

== Life and career ==
Deepthi Nambiar is a Pune-based Malayali and worked as an anchor in a Malayalam television channel. She made her film debut through Pattalam before shooting for Yugam in 2010. A small role in A. R. Murugadoss' debut production Engeyum Eppodhum (2011), landed her a role in Murugadoss' Thuppakki, in which she played Vijay's sister. According to both Murugadoss and Vijay, she was apt for the role with the latter stating that she resembled his sister Vidhya. Deepthi simultaneously worked on Pradeep Nair's Malayalam film Cherukkanum Pennum, Vincent Selva's Thulli Vilayadu, and the unreleased Ungal Viruppam in 2012. While acting, she also pursued her MBA in HR and marketing.

Regarding her performance in the 2012 release Yugam, a critic wrote that she "handles her role competently, bringing in an element of fear in her expression". Regarding her performance in the 2013 release Thulli Vilayadu, a critic felt that she was "chubby" and "bubbly". Cherukkanum Pennum had a delayed release in 2025.

== Filmography ==
Year	Film	Role	Language	Notes
2009	Pattalam	Sophia	Tamil	
2011	Engeyum Eppodhum	Pooja	Tamil	
2012	Yugam	Pooja	Tamil	
2012	Thuppakki	Sanjana	Tamil	
2013	Thulli Vilayadu	Yamuna	Tamil	
2025	Cherukkanum Pennum	Ritha	Malayalam	Delayed release
