= Porattu Nadakam =

Indian film

- Directed by: Noushad Saffron
- Written by: Suneesh Varanad
- Produced by: Vijayan Pallikara and Gayathri Vijayan
- Starring: Saiju Kurup; Jagannath Madhu
- Cinematography: Noushad Shereef
- Edited by: Rajesh Rajendrann(Nayattu)
- Music by: Rahul Raj
- Production company: Emirates Productions
- Distributed by: Emirates Productions Release
- Release date: 18 October 2024
- Country: India
- Languages: Malayalam; Kannada

Porattu Nadakam is a 2024 Indian Malayalam-language film directed by Noushad Saffron and produced by Emirates Productions, with financial backing from Vijayan Pallikara. The film stars and ensemble cast of Saiju Kurup, Dharmajan Bolgatty, Ramesh Pisharody, Arjun Vijay, Rahul Madhav, Nirmal Palazhi, Sooraj Thelakkad and Shukoor Vakeel. The cinematography was done by the director Noushad Shereef, and the film score was composed by Rahul Raj. The script, written by Suneesh Varanad satirizes events in a fictional village called Gopalapura in northern Kerala. The film was announced in January 2023, with principal photography beginning in March 2023.

== Cast ==
- Saiju Kurup as Abu
- Dharmajan Bolgatty as Murugan
- Ramesh Pisharody as Doctor
- Arjun Vijay as Arjun
- Rahul Madhav as Kiran
- Nirmal Palazhi
- Rahul Raj
- Sunil Sukhada as Kiran's father
- Sibi Thomas as Paint Contractor
- Sooraj Thelakkadu as Electrician
- Shukoor Vakeel as Gopal Ji
- Chitra Shenoy as Kiran's Mother.
- Muhemmed Faizel as Sebastian politician
- Geethi Sangeetha
- Aiswarya Mithun Koroth as Abu's Wife
- Babu Annur as Maxi Maman
- Jijina Radhakrishnan as Tanu
- Chitra Nair as Murugan's wife
- Sumayya as prakshan's wife Suma
- Jagannath Madhu as vazhipokkan
- Sidharth S as another vazhipokkan

== Release ==
The film received controversy following allegations of copyright infringement. Initially barred from release, the court later allowed its theatrical screening after the defendants provided monetary security. Later in October 2024, the Additional District Court restricted the sale or transfer of the film's rights to third parties, including OTT platforms and TV channels, until the lawsuit had been resolved. The order ensured the film's intellectual property remained with LSD Productions, only permitting a theatrical release.
