= Sajan K. Ram =

Indian film score composer (born 1981)

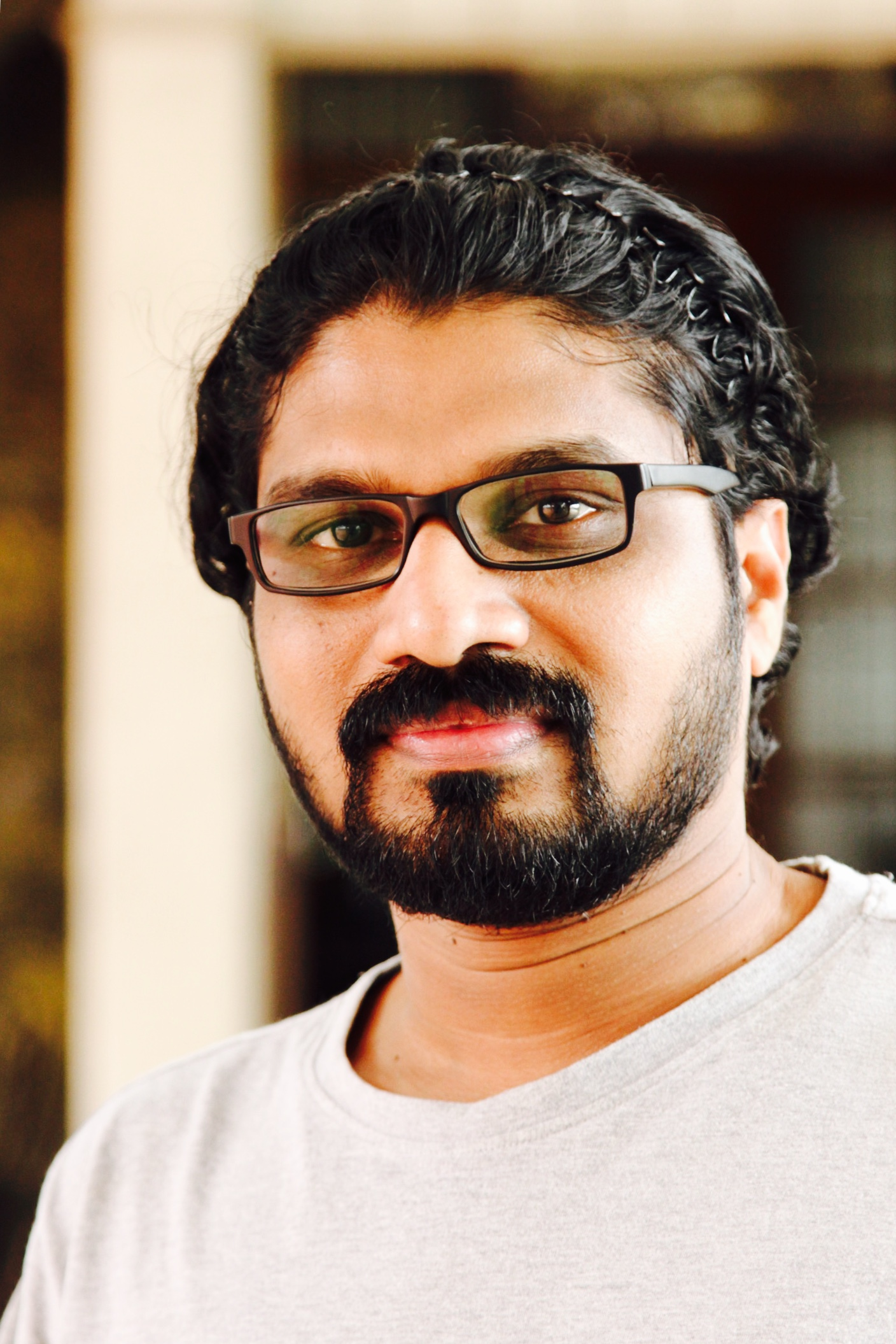
- Born: 2 February 1981 (age 45); Kozhikode
- Occupation: Music composer

Sajan K., better known as Sajan K. Ram, is a music composer, known for his compositions in Malayalam cinema, with films: Josettante Hero, Gunda, Moonnu Wikkattinu 365 Runs and Chennaikoottam. He wrote film score for the movie Papas. He also composed for short films of the awareness programmes of Kerala State Women's Development Corporation, city traffic police and district legal services authority.

== Early life ==
Sajan K Ram was born to K Kunhiraman and Anandavalli. Since his childhood he learned Karnatik music from his father, who was a music composer at All India Radio. His uncle Gireesh Puthenchery was a noted Malayalam lyricist and scriptwriter.
