= Nayar =

Nayar or Nayyar may refer to:

== Groups of people ==
- Nair, a group of Hindu castes from the southern Indian state of Kerala
- Velakkathala Nayar, a caste found in Kerala state, India
- Nayar (name) or Nayyar, an Indian surname and clan within the Khatris of Punjab

== Other ==
- El Nayar, a Mexican municipality

== See also ==
- Nair (disambiguation)
- Nayer
