= Traffic (2016 film) =

2016 Indian film by directed Rajesh Pillai

- Directed by: Rajesh Pillai
- Screenplay by: Suresh Nair
- Dialogues by: Piyush Mishra; Prashant Pandey
- Story by: Bobby-Sanjay
- Based on: Traffic (2011) by Rajesh Pillai
- Produced by: Deepak Dhar; Sameer Gogate; Sameer Rajendran
- Starring: Manoj Bajpayee; Jimmy Shergill; Prosenjit Chatterjee; Parambrata Chatterjee; Divya Dutta
- Cinematography: Santhosh Thundiyil
- Edited by: Nishant Radhakrishnan; Mahesh Narayanan
- Music by: Songs: Mithoon; Shailendra Barve; Score: Vinayak Netke
- Production company: Endemol Shine India
- Distributed by: Fox Star Studios
- Release date: 6 May 2016
- Running time: 104 minutes
- Country: India
- Language: Hindi
- Budget: ₹90 million
- Box office: est.₹116.5 million

Traffic is a 2016 Indian Hindi-language road thriller film directed by Rajesh Pillai. It is a remake of the 2011 Malayalam film of same name directed by Pillai. Originally written by brothers Bobby and Sanjay, the film's screenplay was adapted by Suresh Nair, with the dialogues written by Piyush Mishra.

The film features an ensemble cast consisting of Manoj Bajpayee, Prosenjit Chatterjee, Jimmy Sheirgill, Parambrata Chatterjee, Divya Dutta, Amol Parashar, Jishnu Raghavan and Richa Panai.

The film was released on 6 May 2016 to positive reviews. The film marks the posthumous appearances of Rajesh Pillai and Jishnu Raghavan.

== Plot ==
Actor Dev Kapoor awaits the release of his upcoming film. Traffic constable Ramdas Godbole resumes his duty after having been suspended for taking a bribe in order to help his sister. Rehan Ali, a trainee journalist, gets ready for the first day of his job with an interview with Dev Kapoor.

At a crowded traffic junction in Mumbai, Rehan and his friend Rajeev collide with another vehicle, fatally injuring Rehan. In another car at the junction are cardiologist Dr. Abel Fernandes and his friend, Hemaan.

Rehan is rushed to the hospital and is declared brain dead, being kept alive on a ventilator. Meanwhile in Pune, Dev Kapoor's daughter Ria's heart condition worsens, and she is in urgent need of a heart. Rehan's heart is still functioning and is offered to Ria for transplantation. However, Rehan's parents refuse, but at the insistence of Rajeev and Rehan's girlfriend, Aditi, who tell them that it is too save a life. They reluctantly agree. Despite the heart being available, they are faced with the problem of transporting the heart from Mumbai to Pune, as no chartered flights or helicopters are available as a result of the poor weather conditions and time concerns; therefore, the heart would have to be transported by road.

City Police Commissioner Gurbir Singh is asked to carry out the mission but refuses due to the high risk and complexity involved. He eventually agrees to take responsibility for the mission on the persistence of Dr. Simon D'Souza. No officer is willing to drive the vehicle until Godbole, wanting to regain the respect he had lost because of the scandal, volunteers to carry out the mission. Accompanying him on the mission are Dr. Abel and Rajeev.

The mission goes smoothly for sometime before Abel holds Rajeev at knifepoint and threatens Godbole that he would kill Rajeev if he didn't comply, forcing Godbole to deviate from the highway into a forest. Rajeev retaliates, causing a fight. Abel phones his sister and confesses that he had run his wife over with his car after discovering that she was cheating on him with his best friend, Hemaan, and that she may have died, so he wishes to save himself from the clutches of the police. Dev Kapoor phones him and persuades him that he can save him, but Abel isn't convinced. Out of frustration, Dev's wife Maya explains the mental traumatic condition she has endured as a result of her daughter's heart condition and tells him that no problem can be bigger than this one. A convinced Abel advises Godbole and Rajeev to leave without him; however, Godbole chooses to have Abel with him despite having been urged by Gurbir to have him arrested.

They divert into a road 8 km ahead of the scheduled route, making up for the time lost in the forest. Ria's condition, however, deteriorates, causing Godbole to take an alternative route by driving into a communally sensitive area named Bilal Colony, where police are restricted from entering because of its strong minority. Dev phones corporator Aslam Bhai, who volunteers to clear the roads for the vehicle to pass through. Rajeev, who knows the area quite well, exits the car to ensure that the roads are clear. Dr. Abel also leaves the car to push two cars out of the way that are blocking the route. Godbole drives at a high speed, reaching the hospital in time and covering the mission in almost two hours.

Abel learns from his sister that his wife is alive and has no complaints against him regarding the incident, freeing him. Rehan's parents invite Aditi to their home as a symbol of acceptance. Ria opens her eyes, bringing joy to her family. Gurbir feels satisfied and phones Dr. Simon Souza to thank him. On the way back home, Godbole witnesses a group of men arguing on the side of the road and signals them to stop, ending the film on a happy note.

== Cast ==
- Manoj Bajpayee as Traffic Constable Ramdas Godbole
- Prosenjit Chatterjee as Dev Kapoor
- Jimmy Sheirgill as Joint Commissioner Gurbir Singh, Mumbai Traffic Police
- Parambrata Chatterjee as Dr. Abel Fernandes
- Vishal Singh as Rehan Ali, a trainee journalist
- Amol Parashar as Rajeev, Rehan's friend
- Divya Dutta as Maya Kapoor, Dev's wife
- Ulka Gupta as Ria Kapoor, Dev and Maya's daughter
- Sachin Khedekar as Dr. Ahmed Ali, Rehan's father
- Kitu Gidwani as Mrs. Ali, Rehan's mother
- Nikita Thukral as Aditi, Rehan's girlfriend
- Richa Panai as Shwetha, Abel's wife
- Kaveri as Maria, Abel's sister
- Jishnu Raghavan as Hemaan, Abel's friend
- Vikram Gokhale as Dr. Simon D'Souza
- Rajesh Khattar as Dr. Jagadish Khattar
- Raj Arjun as Corporator Aslam Bhai

== Production ==
Endemol India that has produced several local television shows ventured into feature films, after they acquired the remake rights for the Malayalam film Traffic. Rajesh Pillai who directed the film in Malayalam was retained as the director. Suresh Nair adapted the script of Traffic, stating "slight enhancements have been made in the feel and action content, to ensure commercial viability. But the script still remains the brilliant script that the original is".

Manoj Bajpayee was signed to play the lead role in April 2013. Bengali actors, Parambrata Chatterjee and Prosenjit Chatterjee were signed to play pivotal roles. Pillai confirmed that Bajpayee would play the role of a constable, Parambrata would play a doctor and Prosenjit would play an actor, reprising the roles of Sreenivasan, Kunchacko Boban, and Rahman from the original. Divya Dutta signed the film in August, playing Lena's part from the original. In November 2013, it was reported that Malayali actress Kaveri would reprise the role portrayed by Roma Asrani but that she will portray a mature and introvert personality as opposed to a bubbly Miriam from the original.

Mithoon was signed as the music composer and had already recorded three songs for the film by May 2013. Pillai stated that the film would be entirely shot on the Mumbai Pune Expressway and Hyderabad. In late August, the first schedule had been completed in Hyderabad. The final schedule began on 2 September in Mumbai.

== Reception ==
=== Critical reception ===
Meena Iyer of The Times of India gave it 4 stars out of 5, describing the film as a well-intentioned movie with fine performances from its ensemble cast. Anna MM Vetticad of Firstpost stated, "it is Needless messaging which spoils this Manoj Bajpayee-starrer". Shubhra Gupta of The Indian Express gave it 2 stars out of 5, and quoted that Crispness and the sense of urgency is missing in movie. Saibal Chatterjee of NDTV gave it 4 stars out of 5, describing the film as a fitting swan song: an unmissable film.

Sweta Kaushal of Hindustan Times gave it 4 stars out of 5, titled that A Tight script, stellar performances make it a must-watch. Prarthna Sarkar of International Business Times gave it 3 stars out of 5, describing it as a must watch. Namarta Joshi of The Hindu quoted "'Traffic' wears thin, feels rushed. There is neither much of an emotional tug nor an edge-of-the-seat urgency that the film promised to deliver." Sukanya Verma from Rediff.com gave it 2 stars out of 5, said movie is muddled and lacklustre in its setup. Bollywood Hungama gave it 2 stars out of 5. Nandini Ramnath of Scroll.in said that the remake of the Malayalam hit loses the essence of the original and movie titled Traffic goes nowhere.

=== Box office ===
According to Box Office India, the film collected ₹110 million (US$1.1 million) against a budget of ₹90 million (US$930,000).

== Music ==
The film's music was composed by Mithoon and Shailendra Barve, while the lyrics were written by Turaz, Mithoon, Jitendra Joshi, and Sayeed Quadri.

Traffic
No.	Title	Lyrics	Music	Singers	Length
1.	"Keh Bhi De"	Turaz	Mithoon	Benny Dayal & Palak Muchhal	6:10
2.	"Neki Ki Raahon Mein"	Mithoon	Mithoon	Mithoon & Arijit Singh	4:59
3.	"Kuch Der Sahi"	Mithoon	Mithoon	Palak Muchhal	6:39
4.	"Vitthala Naam"	Jitendra Joshi	Shailendra Barve	Prasenjit Kosambi	4:56
5.	"Tu Alvida"	Sayeed Quadri	Mithoon	Mithoon & Aakanksha Sharma	5:10
Total length:					27:54

== Awards and nominations ==
Award	Category	Recipients and nominees	Result	Ref.
9th Mirchi Music Awards	Upcoming Female Vocalist of The Year	Aakanksha Sharma – "Tu Alvida"	Nominated	
