= Alexander Jacob (police officer) =

Indian retired police officer (born 1955)

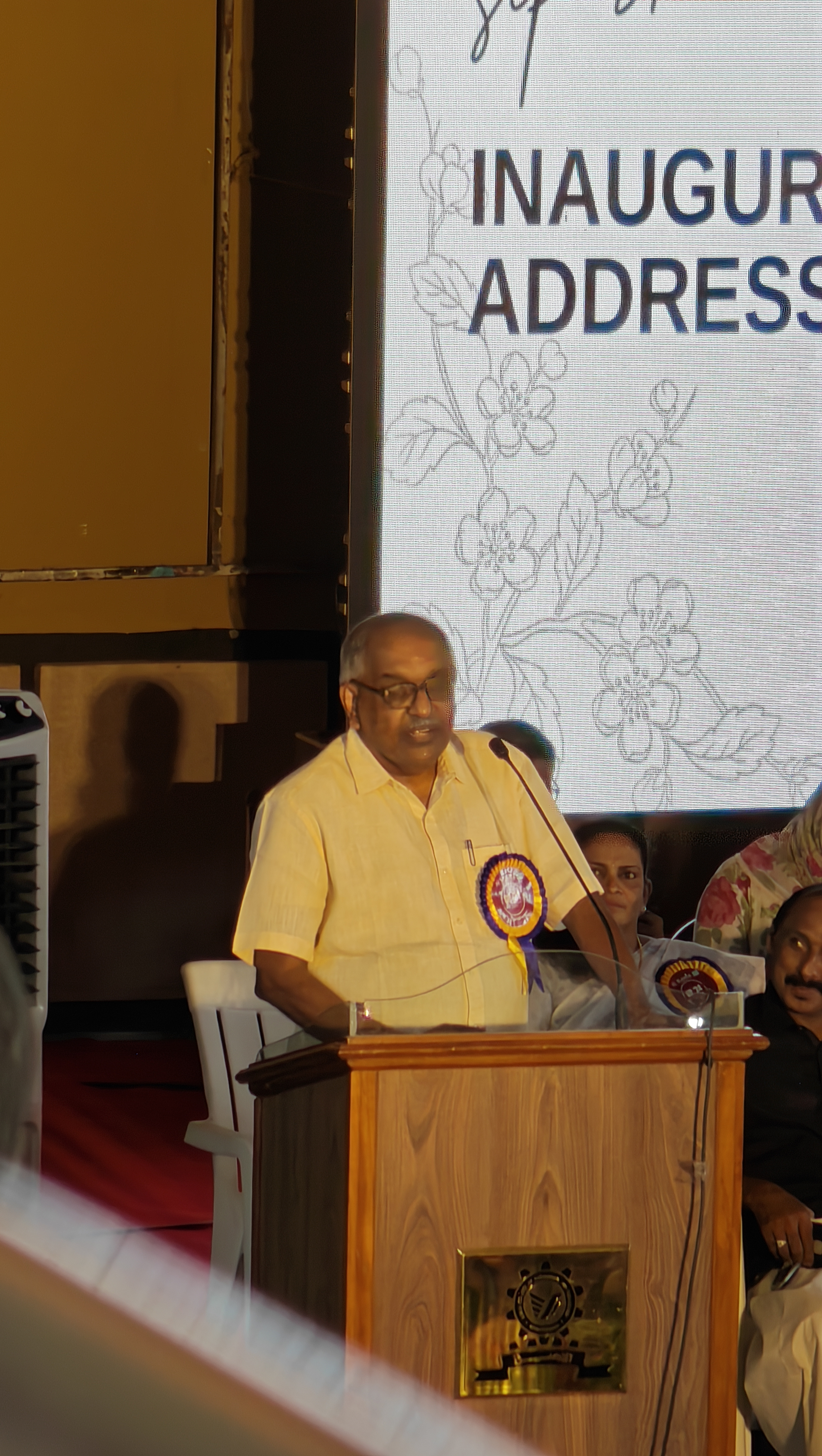
- Jacob in 2024
- Born: 3 June 1955 (age 71)
- Spouse: Elizabeth John
- Children: 3

Academic background
- Education: Mar Ivanios College

Alexander Jacob (born 3 July 1955) is an Indian retired police officer and former college lecturer. He rose to the rank of Director General of Police in the Kerala police force heading the prisons department and later assumed charge as the managing director of Kerala Police Housing Construction Corporation. At present he is the Nodal Officer of National University for Police Sciences and Security Studies.

== Education ==
Alexander was born to parents who were both school teachers at Thumpamon near Pandalam, Kerala. He attended St. Goretti's School, Nalanchira, Thiruvananthapuram and Mar Gregorios School, Thumpamon.

He studied pre-degree at St. Xavier's College, Thiruvananthapuram and earned a B.Sc in Chemistry at Mar Ivanios College. He studied at MA Degree level in English, History, Politics and Sociology. and received an MPhil degree for his thesis on low-cost policing. He researched for a PhD in English literature on Historical Novels of Indo-Anglian Literature.

== Early career ==
Alexander started his career as a subeditor on Malayala Manorama, and then as a lecturer at Mar Ivanios College. He placed first in the bank officers exam and was assigned to the Indian Overseas Bank but refused because it did not suit him. He was recruited to the Indian Police Service in 1982.

== IPS officer ==
After his probation, Alexander was posted as Superintendent of Police, Kottayam and subsequently at Kannur. He also worked as the Commissioner of Police, Kochi City in 1990. He was the principal of Police Training College, Thiruvananthapuram, in 1992–1995. He was promoted to Deputy Inspector General of Police (DIG), Northern Range (Kerala) and subsequently as DIG, Armed Police Battalion.

He was the director of Kerala Women's Commission taking over his assignment as Secretary, Institute of Management in Government in January 1999. In May 2000 he was posted as Joint Director of Kerala Police Academy. He was promoted as IGP and posted Inspector General of Police (Training), Kerala State and Ex Officio Joint Director Kerala Police Academy in 2001. In 2006 he was promoted to the Director of Kerala Police Academy. Alexander is also involved in teaching many different groups of students in the Civil Service.

== Awards ==
Alexander was awarded the President's Police Medal for Meritorious Service by the President of India on the Republic Day, 2004.

== Personal life ==
Alexander is married to Elizabeth John, a reader in the Collegiate Education Department. They are currently residing at Kollam and the couple have three daughters.
