= Mili (2015 film) =

- Theatrical poster
- Directed by: Rajesh Pillai
- Written by: Mahesh Narayan
- Produced by: Satish B. Satish
- Starring: Amala Paul; Nivin Pauly
- Cinematography: Anishlal R.S.
- Edited by: B. Abhilash
- Music by: Songs: Gopi Sunder; Shaan Rahman; Score: Gopi Sunder
- Production companies: Ordinary Films; Cross Pictures
- Distributed by: Golden Eye Movies
- Release date: 23 January 2015
- Running time: 113 minutes
- Country: India
- Language: Malayalam
- Budget: ₹4.75 crore (US$490,000)
- Box office: ₹5.35 crore (US$560,000)

Mili is a 2015 Malayalam drama film directed by Rajesh Pillai. Described as a "heroine-centric motivational film," Mili has Amala Paul in the title role and also stars Nivin Pauly. The film, produced by Ordinary Films, marks the debut of editor Mahesh Narayanan as a scriptwriter. The story revolves around an introverted girl who struggles hard to meet others' expectations. Shamna Kasim, Sanusha, Praveena, Sai Kumar, and Amol Parashar appear in significant roles. The film was shot in Thiruvananthapuram

== Plot ==
Mili Nair is an introvert who is very depressed. Her self-affection and inferiority complex puts off everyone. Nobody likes her character or even attempts to help her. Mili chooses to rise above the challenges and take back the reins of her life. Her transformation and learning to deal with her emotions form the crux of the movie. Meanwhile, Naveen, a soft-skills trainer, becomes a support for Mili.

== Cast ==
- Amala Paul as Mili Nair
  - Nandhana Varma as young Mili
- Nivin Pauly as Naveen
- Sanusha as Anupama
- Amol Parashar as Arun Iyer
- Shamna Kasim as Renuka
- Sija Rose as Raji
- Sai Kumar as Mili's father
- Idavela Babu as School Manager
- Poojappura Radhakrishnan as Security staff
- Sanil Kumar as Association Member
- Santhosh K as Association Member
- Ashraf Pezhumoodu as Assication Member
- Premalal as School Principal
- Praveena as Nancy
- Ambika as Mercy
- Soumya Sadanandan as Mili's friend
- Swapna Menon as Mii's friend
- Riya Saira as Kalyani
- Vanitha Krishnachandran as Sudha
- Bindu Panicker as Mili's mother
- Sangeetha Mohan as Roopa
- Karthika Kannan as School Management Member
- Anju Aravind as Thara
- Anjali Nair as Anitha
- Devi Ajith as Hostel Warden
- Ranjini Menon as Shaiby, School teacher
- Master Neil Kaushik as Nikhil
- Baby Ammu
- Fardeen Ahamed Fasil as boy reading the book

== Music ==
Mili

Soundtrack album by Gopi Sunder
- Released: 2015
- Genre: Feature film soundtrack
- Language: Malayalam
- Producer: Gopi Sunder

Gopi Sunder chronology
| Cousins (2014) | Mili (2015) | Malli Malli Idi Rani Roju (2015) |

The music was composed by Gopi Sunder with Shaan Rahman. The background score was by Gopi Sunder.

| Track # | Song | Singer(s) | Duration (min:sec) | Lyricist |
|---|---|---|---|---|
| 1 | "Kanmaniye" (Female Version) | Minmini | 4:51 | Hari Narayanan |
| 2 | "Mili Mili Mili" (Female Version) | Pavithra Menon | 4:24 | Hari Narayanan |
| 3 | "Engengo Engengo" | Gopi Sunder | 5:03 | Hari Narayanan |
| 4 | "Mili Mili Mili" (Male Version) | Gopi Sunder | 4:24 | Hari Narayanan |
| 5 | "Manjupeyume" | Najim Arshad, Mridula Warrier | 3:42 | Hari Narayanan |
| 6 | "Kanmaniye" (Male Version) | Gopi Sunder | 3:26 | Hari Narayanan |
| 7 | "Manpatha Neettunna" | Shaan Rahman | 4:09 | Hari Narayanan |
| 8 | "Mili Theme Song" | Gopi Sunder | 2:00 | Hari Narayanan |

== Box office ==
The film was made on a budget of ₹4.75 crore (US$490,000) and sold its satellite rights for ₹2.95 crore (US$310,000). It completed a 50-day run in some releasing centres. The total distribution share was ₹2.40 crore (US$250,000) doing a business of ₹5.35 crore (US$560,000) considering the theatrical gross and satellite rights. The film was one of the "profitable" Malayalam films in the first half of 2015.
