= Maanikyan =

- Directed by: K. K. Haridas
- Written by: Antony Eastman
- Screenplay by: Antony Eastman
- Starring: Kalabhavan Mani; Nandini; Jagathy Sreekumar; Siddique
- Cinematography: Utpal V Nayanar
- Edited by: G Murali
- Music by: Thej Mervin
- Production company: Malayalam Movie Makers
- Distributed by: Malayalam Movie Makers
- Release date: 21 August 2005
- Country: India
- Language: Malayalam

Maanikyan is a 2005 Indian Malayalam film, directed by K. K. Haridas. The film stars Kalabhavan Mani, Nandini, Jagathy Sreekumar and Siddique in lead roles. The film had musical score by Thej Mervin.

== Cast ==
- Kalabhavan Mani as Maanikyan
- Nandini as Nirmala Menon (Geethanjali)
  - Sruthi Lakshmi as Young Nirmala
- Jagathy Sreekumar as Shankaran
- Siddique as Gopikrishnan
- Kaviraj as Jayaprakash
- Saranya Sasi as Chandralekha
- Salim Kumar as Kumaran
- Suresh Krishna as Rajendran
- Rizabawa as Shekhara Menon
- Bindu Panicker as Gowri
- Manka Mahesh as Vilasiniyamma
- Gayathri as Thulasi
- Aniyappan
- Geetha Salam
- Lakshmi Krishnamoorthy
- Sagar Shiyas
- Spadikam George
- Guinness Pakru as Cameo Appearance
- Balachandran Chullikkadu as Cameo Appearance
- Subbalakshmi as Ammumma

== Soundtrack ==
The music was composed by Thej Mervin.

| No. | Song | Singers | Lyrics | Length (m:ss) |
|---|---|---|---|---|
| 1 | "Chik Chik" | M. G. Sreekumar | Gireesh Puthenchery | |
| 2 | "Janmangalaay" | Sujatha Mohan | Gireesh Puthenchery | |
| 3 | "Muttathe Munthiri" | Nikhil K. Menon | Gireesh Puthenchery | |
| 4 | "Muttathe Munthiri Cheppe" | Ranjini Jose | Gireesh Puthenchery | |
| 5 | "Navaraathri" | K. S. Chithra | Gireesh Puthenchery | |
| 6 | "Ponnarachu" | Afsal | Gireesh Puthenchery | |
| 7 | "Saayam Sandhyayil" | K. J. Yesudas | Gireesh Puthenchery | |
