= Bangkok Summer =

2011 Malayalam film

- Directed by: Pramod-Pappan
- Written by: Rajesh Jayaraman
- Produced by: Joby George Thadathil
- Starring: Rahul Madhav; Unni Mukundan; Richa Panai
- Cinematography: Pramod Pappan
- Edited by: Renjith Touchriver
- Music by: Ouseppachan
- Production company: Joyel Cine Lab
- Release date: 22 July 2011
- Country: India
- Language: Malayalam

Bangkok Summer is a 2011 Indian Malayalam-language action drama film directed by Pramod Pappan. The film stars Rahul Madhav, Unni Mukundan, Richa Panai, and Rosin Jolly.

== Plot ==
The film tells the story of Shrihari who, in search of his brother Madavan, makes it to Bangkok. In the middle of this search, Shrihari faces many problems and struggles made by the Pattaya Mafia.

== Cast ==
- Rahul Madhav as Srihari
- Unni Mukundan as Madhavan (voice dubbed by Saran)
- Richa Panai as Ganga
- Rosin Jolly as Maria
- Sruthi Lakshmi as Raziya
- Parvathi T. as Doctor Jayasree
- Jiyad Irani as Willy
- Anoop Sankar
- Arun
- Alex Mathew
- Sukumari as Patti

== Production ==
The film was the first production by Joby George Thadathil. The film stars Unni Mukundan, Rahul Madhav, and Richa Panai in the lead roles, alongside several Chinese actors. Production began in Bangkok in August 2010, with most of the film being shot there.

== Reception ==
A critic from Rediff.com rated the film one out of five stars and wrote that "The promos of Bangkok Summer promised something much better than the torture one has to endure.".
