= Sandwich (2011 film) =

- Film poster
- Directed by: M. S. Manu
- Written by: Ratheesh Sukumaran
- Produced by: M. C. Arun; Sudeep Karakkat
- Starring: Kunchacko Boban; Ananya; Richa Panai
- Cinematography: Pradeep Nair
- Edited by: Don Max
- Music by: Jayan Pisharody
- Production company: Line of Colours
- Distributed by: Rajaputhra Films
- Release date: 14 October 2011
- Country: India
- Language: Malayalam

Sandwich is a 2011 Indian Malayalam-language comedy film directed by M. S. Manu (in his directorial debut). starring Kunchacko Boban, Richa Panai and Ananya in the lead roles. The film was released on 14 October 2011. Despite the film being unsuccessful, the character of Aandipetty Nayikar, played by Suraj Venjaramoodu, gained a cult following through memes.

== Plot ==
Sai, a software engineer, gets involved in a car accident whilst returning from an office party, which leads to Ajayan, a notorious criminal, getting killed. While Sai is discreetly exonerated by Police Commissioner Benjamin because the deceased was a wanted criminal and Sai having an upstanding record, he becomes the target of Murugan, Ajayan's dangerous but clumsy younger brother, who believes Sai killed his brother on purpose. Murugan and his men start to hunt Sai in revenge, leading to Sai being hospitalized.

Just when Sai believes things cannot get any worse for him, he encounters Aandipetty Nayikar, another dreaded but airheaded gangster who was Ajayan's sworn enemy. Ajayan killed Nayiker's nephew and right hand man Anbarasu, and claimed control over the city from Nayiker. Now that Ajayan is dead, Nayiker seeks to regain his former glory. At the same time, Sai has attracted the appreciation and love of Nayiker, for he killed Ajayan, and Nayiker wishes to make him the heir of his criminal empire, to the point of trying to get his daughter Kanmani married to him. Nayiker, through power and inappropriate expressions of care and concern, becomes a nuisance in Sai's life, putting him under protection, trying to teach him to be a gangster, and forcefully getting Sai engaged to his daughter. All the while Murugan continues his attempts to take revenge on Sai, which further fuels Nayiker's protective violence. All of this causes much problem in Sai's life, straining his relationship with his family, friends and his girlfriend Shruthi. When it becomes apparent that even the police may be helpless, Sai decides to solve this once and for all.

With the help of his friends and Commissioner Benjamin, Sai decides to trap both Nayiker and Murugan in an elaborate scheme to end their menace. He first manages to clear things with Kanmani, both of them parting ways amicably. Then he, along with his friends and Benjamin trick both Nayiker and Murugan into attacking the convoy of a Central Minister, believing it to be Sai and Shruthi trying to elope, and place fabricated evidence in their vehicles, which frame Nayiker, Murugan and their gang as domestic terrorists attempting to kidnap the minister, leading to their arrest.

Benjamin manages to convince the Central Agencies that the confused Nayiker and Murugan maybe terrorists, leading to them being taken away to be incarcerated in Bihar for further questioning. Finally free of all his problems, Sai returns to a normal life with his family and friends.

== Cast ==
- Kunchacko Boban as Sai
- Ananya as Kanmani
- Richa Panai as Shruthi
- Lalu Alex as Ramachandran, Sai's father
- Suraj Venjaramood as Aandipetty Nayiker
- K B Ganesh Kumar as Benjamin S, Police Commissioner
- Vijayakumar as Murugan
- Indrans as Brusli Sasi
- P. Sreekumar as Bhadran, Shruthi's father
- Shari as Sreedevi, Sai's mother
- Biju Pappan as Mani
- Poojappura Ravi as Advocate Purushothaman
- Subi Suresh as Seema, Ammini Kumar's wife
- Kottayam Nazeer as Ammini Kumar
- Valsala Menon as Sai's grandmother
- Shaji Mavelikkara as nahiker's assistant
- Kulappully Leela as Murugan's mother

== Production ==
Kunchacko Boban appears in the lead of this debut film by M S Manu who was an associate to director Shaji Kailas. The film has Richa Panai (of Bhima Jewellery advertisement) as the heroine, along with Ananya.
