= Josettante Hero =

- Film poster
- Directed by: K. K. Haridas
- Written by: Anzar Kalabhavan; Sathyan Kolangad
- Produced by: Salmara Muhammed Sharief
- Starring: Anoop Menon; Kriti Kapoor
- Cinematography: Senthil Raj
- Edited by: Vivek Harshan
- Music by: Sajan K. Ram
- Production company: MRS Productions
- Release date: 20 April 2012
- Country: India
- Language: Malayalam

Josettante Hero is a 2012 Malayalam film directed by K. K. Haridas, starring Anoop Menon and Kriti Kapoor in the lead roles. The film was not very well received.

== Plot ==
The film tells a story with movie-making as the backdrop. Vijayaraghavan appears as the title character of Josettan, who is a senior film producer. Anoop Menon comes up as Saajan Malyath, the still photographer of the film who is accidentally selected to become the hero of the new film in production.

== Cast ==
- Anoop Menon as Sajan
- Kriti Kapoor as Haritha
- Vijayaraghavan as Jose
- Bheeman Raghu as Vijayan Pattikara
- Zeenath as Annie Jose
- Kochu Preman as Sreedharan Parasala
- Ashokan as Raviprakash
- Sudheesh as Kuchelan
- Suraj Venjaramoodu as T.T Kuruvilla
- Kalabhavan Shajohn as Chandran
- Janardhanan as K.P Paniker
- Shivaji Guruvayoor as Rahul Krishnadas
- Kalabhavan Rahman as Shukkor
- Dimple Rose as Leena Jose, Jose's daughter
- Fathima Babu
- Andhu
- Kripa
- Harisanth Saran -cameo appearance
- K. K. Haridas -cameo appearance
- Salim Bava – cameo appearance

== Reception ==
=== Critical reception ===
The film received negative reviews upon release.

- Times of India rated the film 1 out of 5 stars, saying that "It shows how a film, no matter how nicely conceived, can run out of control for want of craft."
- Rediff.com also rated the film 1 out of 5 star and criticised that "there is little to say about this film other than it does not seem to be deserving of your time."
- Sify.com rated the film as avoidable and also said that "Josettante Hero will find a place among the worst films released during recent times."
- Nowrunning.com rated the film 1/5 and said "a film that attempts to take a satirical look at the industry, but which in the process ends up making even a great mockery of itself."
- TheaterBalcony.com rated film 1.5/5 and said "At the end film failed to give the real content even after having a great concept. A group of talents were just wasted in this movie. Josettente Hero has no intention to entertain the audience."

== Box office ==
The film received negative reviews upon release and commercially flopped at the box office.
