= Picnic (1975 film) =

- Poster
- Directed by: J. Sasikumar
- Written by: S. L. Puram Sadanandan
- Screenplay by: S. L. Puram Sadanandan
- Produced by: C. C. Baby; V. M. Chandy
- Starring: Prem Nazir; Lakshmi; Unnimary; Adoor Bhasi; M. G. Soman; Jose Prakash; Bahadoor
- Cinematography: J. G. Vijayam
- Edited by: V. P. Krishnan
- Music by: M. K. Arjunan
- Production company: MS Productions
- Distributed by: Jolly Films
- Release date: 11 April 1975
- Country: India
- Language: Malayalam
- Budget: INR 7,00,000

Picnic is a 1975 Indian Malayalam-language film directed by J. Sasikumar and produced by C. C. Baby and V. M. Chandi. The film stars Prem Nazir, Lakshmi, Unnimary and Adoor Bhasi. The film's musical score was composed by M. K. Arjunan. It was one of the biggest hits of Prem Nazir.

== Plot summary ==
The story follows a collector, Jagat Singh, who believes in strict adherence to the law, and his son, Ravi. Residing in the same town are two rich and evil businessmen, Bhushan Nath and Kabza Kanhaiyalal, and their sons, Kailash and Prakash. Kailash and Prakash are well known in the town for rape, extortion, and murder.

Ravi's friend Satyam, a journalist, is killed by Kailash and Prakash. Ravi is motivated to avenge the death of his friend and kill the duo, but is stopped by his father.

== Cast ==
- Prem Nazir as Ravi Varma, Rajagopal
- Lakshmi as Maala
- Unnimary as Radha
- Adoor Bhasi AB Menon
- Jose Prakash Aadivasi Moopan
- Bahadoor as Venu
- Kaduvakulam Antony as Sugunan
- M. G. Soman as Chudala Muthu
- Sreelatha Namboothiri as Vasanthi
- Meena as Manonmani
- Vijayaraghavan
- Vincent as Babu
- Manavalan Joseph as Panicker

== Soundtrack ==
The music was composed by M. K. Arjunan with lyrics by Sreekumaran Thampi.

No.	Song	Singers	Lyrics	Length (m:ss)
1	"Chandrakkala Maanathu"	K. J. Yesudas	Sreekumaran Thampi	
2	"Kasthoori Manakkunnalo"	K. J. Yesudas	Sreekumaran Thampi	
3	"Kudu Kudu Paadi Varum"	P. Jayachandran, P. Madhuri	Sreekumaran Thampi	
4	"Odippokum Vasanthakaalame"	K. J. Yesudas	Sreekumaran Thampi	
5	"Shilpikal Nammal"	P. Jayachandran, P. Madhuri	Sreekumaran Thampi	
6	"Thenpoove Neeyoralpam"	P. Jayachandran, P. Madhuri	Sreekumaran Thampi	
7	"Vaalkkannezhuthi"	K. J. Yesudas, Vani Jairam	Sreekumaran Thampi	
