= Circle (2023 film) =

- Circle poster
- Directed by: Neelakanta
- Written by: Neelakanta
- Produced by: M V Sharat Chandra; Venu Babu Addagada; T Sumalatha Annith Reddy
- Starring: Sai Ronak; Baba Bhaskar; Arshin Mehta; Richa Panai; Naina
- Cinematography: Ranganath Gogineni
- Edited by: Madhu G. Reddy
- Music by: N. S. Prasu
- Production company: Aura Productions banner
- Release date: 7 July 2023
- Country: India
- Language: Telugu

Circle is a 2023 Indian Telugu-language film directed by Neelakanta. The music is scored by NS. Prasu, cinematography by Ranganath Gogineni. It is produced by M V Sharat Chandra, Venu Babu Addagada, and T Sumalatha Annith Reddy under the Aura Productions banner. The lead roles are played by Sai Ronak, Baba Bhaskar, Richa Panai, and Arshi Mehta. The film was released worldwide theatrically on 7 July 2023.

== Plot ==
Kailash, a petrified man, asks Ganesh about his job and is taunted to guess who hired him. Kailash tries to connect with the hired person and pleads for his life, but Ganesh insists he has no enemies. Kailash recollects three love affairs, one with a painter and another with a political girl. Kailash frees himself and ties Ganesh up to a chair, but Ganesh threatens his death. Kailash tries to guess who might want him dead and plead mercy, but another tragic twist occurs when aspiring model APARNA enters the story.

== Cast ==
- Sai Ronak as Kailash
- Richa Panai as Arundathi
- Arshin Mehta as Himani Rajput
- Baba Bhaskar as Puttur Ganesh
- Naina as Malvika

== Reception ==
Circle got a review from a critic from Asianet News who gave the film a rating of 2.5/5. A critic from Sakshi also gave the film the same rating.
