= Oridam =

- Directed by: Pradeep Nair
- Written by: Pradeep Nair
- Screenplay by: Pradeep Nair
- Produced by: Jesinlal James, Pradeep Nair
- Starring: Geetu Mohandas, K.P.A.C Lalitha, Swapna Sathyan
- Cinematography: Manoj Mundayat
- Edited by: Ranjan Abrham
- Music by: Issac Thomas Kottukapilly
- Production company: FILM BUFF PRODUCTIONS
- Distributed by: 2D Creations through Valiyaveettil Release
- Release date: 24 March 2005
- Country: India
- Language: Malayalam

Oridam is a 2005 Indian Malayalam film, directed by Pradeep Nair, starring Vishnu and Geetu Mohandas in the lead roles. The film follows the quest of a sex worker to find a place for herself in a society which mistreats her. The sex worker (Geethu Mohandas), along with many of the other characters in the film, is not given a name.

== Awards ==
- Special Jury Award in Direction-52nd National Film Awards
- Special Jury Award in Direction-Kerala State Film Awards
- Best Actress-Kerala State Film Awards
- Best Background Score- Kerala State Film Awards
- Best Costume Design – Kerala State Film Awards
- Best Film Processing-Kerala State Film Awards
- Kerala Film Critics Association Awards – director, actress, sound mixing

== Cast ==
- KPAC Lalitha
- Vishnu
- Baby Malu
- CK Babu
- Geetu Mohandas
- Martin Chalissery
- PS Radhakrishnan
- Ponni
- Swapna Sathyan
- Sathyan
- TS Raju
