= Rajesh Pillai =

Indian film director (1974–2016)

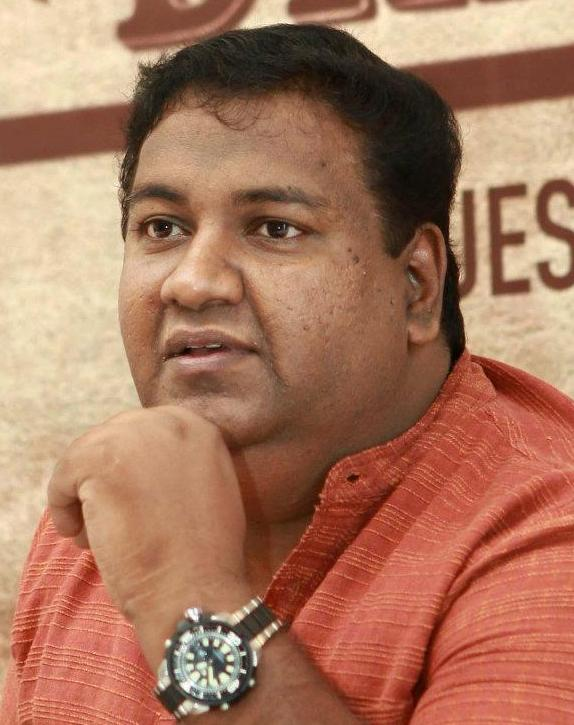
- Pillai in 2012
- Born: 7 October 1974; Haripad, Alappuzha, Kerala, India
- Died: 27 February 2016 (aged 41); Kochi, Ernakulam, Kerala, India
- Occupation: Film director
- Years active: 2005–2016
- Spouse: Mekha Rajesh

Rajesh Raman Pillai (7 October 1974 – 27 February 2016) was an Indian film director best known for his work in the Malayalam cinema. He is credited with setting a new trend in Malayalam cinema with his thriller, Traffic (2011).

Rajesh Pillai made his directorial debut with Hridayathil Sookshikkan (2005) which turned out to be a commercial and critical failure. His second film Traffic, written by brothers Bobby and Sanjay was released in 2011. The film has its narrative in a hyperlink format and is inspired by an actual event that happened in Chennai. The film was a notable success and is widely regarded as one of the defining movies of the Malayalam New Wave.

In August 2012, the director announced his next movie titled Motorcycle Diaries. However Pillai put the project on hold and started working on Mili, a heroine-centric film with Amala Paul in title role opposite Nivin Pauly. The film released in January 2015 and received positive reviews from critics and became an above average grosser at the box office.

Vettah, a psychological thriller starring Kunchacko Boban, Manju Warrier, Indrajith Sukumaran and Kadhal Sandhya, scripted by Arunlal Ramachandran, is touted to be the first ever mind game movie in Malayalam. It was released on 26 February 2016, a day before Pillai's death. Manju Warrier plays the role of Sreebala IPS, the City Police Commissioner in this film.

== Death ==
Suffering from non-alcoholic fatty liver disease, Pillai died on 27 February 2016, at PVS Hospital, Kochi He is survived by his wife Megha, father Raman Pillai, and an elder sister.

== Filmography ==
| Year | Title | Notes |
|---|---|---|
| 2005 | Hridayathil Sookshikkan | |
| 2011 | Traffic | Remade in Tamil as Chennaiyil Oru Naal |
| 2015 | Mili | |
| 2016 | Vettah | Released a day before his death |
| 2016 | Traffic | Posthumous release; Hindi remake of Traffic (2011) |
| TBA | Motorcycle Diaries | Unfinished film |

== Awards and nominations ==
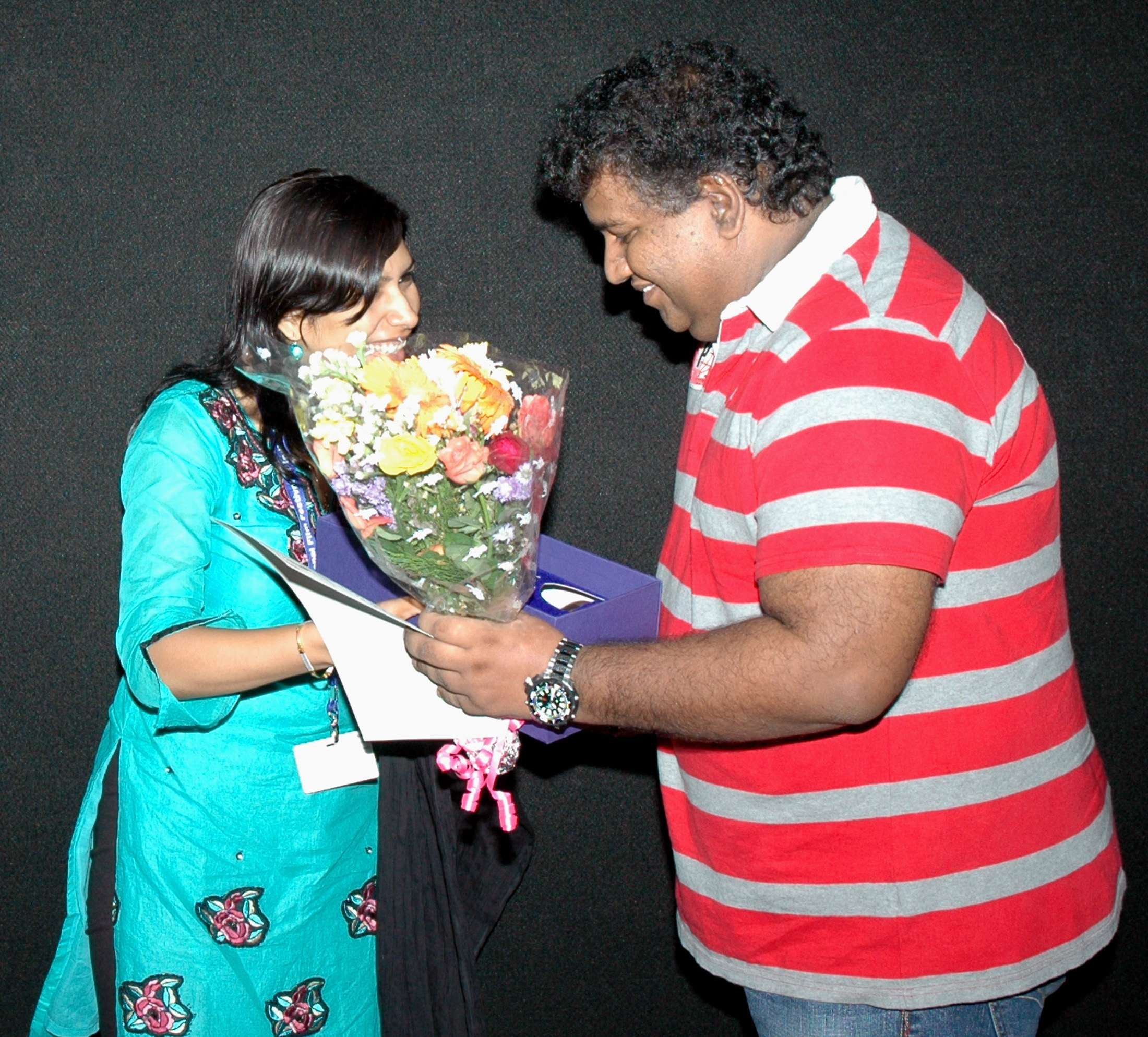
Rajesh Pillai being felicitated at IFFI (2011)

- Won – 1st South Indian International Movie Awards for Best Direction – Traffic
- Won – Jaihind Film Awards 2012 for Best Direction – Traffic
- Won – Reporter TV Film Awards 2012 for Best Direction – Traffic
- Won – Nana Film Awards for Best Direction – Traffic
- Won – Amritha Film Award - Trend Setting Film Director
- Won – Aimfill Inspire Film Award - Best Innovative Film
- Won – National Film Promotion Council 2011 - Pratheeksha Puraskaram
- Won –Mathrubhumi Film Awards 2011 - Path Breaking Movie of the Year
- Won – Minnalai Film TV Awards-Best Director - 2011
- Won – Audi-Ritz Icon Award 2012 - Iconic Film of the Year Malayalam
- Won – Santhosham South Indian Film Award 2011
- Won – Southspin Fashion Award-2012
- Nominated – Asianet Film Awards 2012 for Best Direction – Traffic
- Nominated – Surya Film Awards for Best Direction – Traffic
