= Vacation (2005 film) =

- Directed by: K. K. Haridas
- Written by: Shornur Viayan
- Screenplay by: Shornur Viayan
- Produced by: A. J. Shahar
- Starring: Amitha; Harishree Ashokan; Indrans; Lalu Alex
- Cinematography: K. P. Nambyathiri
- Edited by: G. Murali
- Music by: Dr G. Santhosh; Kaithapram Vishwanathan Nambudiri
- Production company: AJS Productions
- Distributed by: AJS Productions
- Release date: 24 May 2005
- Country: India
- Language: Malayalam

Vacation is a 2005 Indian Malayalam-language film, directed by K. K. Haridas and produced by A. J. Shahar. The film stars Amitha, Harishree Ashokan, Indrans and Lalu Alex in lead roles. Dr G. Santhosh and Kaithapram Vishwanathan Nambudiri composed the music.

== Cast ==
- Amitha
- Harishree Ashokan
- Indrans
- Lalu Alex as Martin
- Prem Kishore
- Suhasini as Celine
- Vijayaraghavan
- Cochin Haneefa
- Kaviraj

== Soundtrack ==
The music was composed by Dr G. Santhosh and Kaithapram Vishwanathan Nambudiri.

No.	Song	Singers	Lyrics	Length (m:ss)
1	"Karimbe Kadakkanni"	Ranjini Jose, Sudeep Kumar	Sohan Roy	
2	"Masti Masti" (M)	Chorus, Karthik	Sohan Roy	
3	"Masti Masti" (D)	Karthik, Sumitha	Sohan Roy	
4	"Mizhineer"	Santhosh Keshav	Sohan Roy	
5	"Mullappoo"	P. Jayachandran, Sujatha Mohan	Sohan Roy	
6	"Nidrathan"	Madhu Balakrishnan	Sohan Roy	
7	"Pranayathoni"	Madhu Balakrishnan	Sohan Roy	
8	"Saandra Sandhye" (F)	K. S. Chithra	Sohan Roy	
9	"Saandra Sandhye" (M)	K. J. Yesudas	Sohan Roy	
10	"Saandra Sandhye" (D)	K. J. Yesudas, K. S. Chithra	Sohan Roy	
11	"Saandra Sandhye" (Violin)		Sohan Roy	
12	"Viraha Thamburu"	Manjari	Sohan Roy	
