= Hridayathil Sookshikkan =

- Directed by: Rajesh Pillai
- Story by: Kalavoor Ravikumar
- Produced by: Bose Varghese
- Starring: Kunchacko Boban; Bhavana; Harisree ashokan Nithya Das; Bhanupriya
- Music by: Mohan Sitara
- Release date: 18 February 2005
- Country: India
- Language: Malayalam

Hridayathil Sookshikkan (transl. To keep safe in your heart) is a 2005 Malayalam-language romance film directed by debutant Rajesh Pillai. Produced by Bose Varghese, the film had Kunchacko Boban and Bhavana playing the main characters. The plot was loosely based on the 2000 American film Meet the Parents. The film's soundtrack was composed by Mohan Sitara.

== Plot ==
Sreenath works in an advertising firm in Bangalore. He meets a model Amritha and falls in love with her. He tries to win her over but she says that he has to get her father's approval first. Sreenath and Amritha go to their village in Kerala to influence her father and win over her parents. But things go awry after Amritha's father starts hating Sreenath due to his hyperactive and overenthusiastic nature. After all, his efforts to win him over go in vain.

== Cast ==
- Kunchacko Boban as Sreenath/Sree
- Bhavana as Amrutha
- Harishree Ashokan as Mathen
- Nithya Das as Nanitha
- Bhanupriya as Nirmala
- Shamna Kasim as Model
- Siddique
- Riza Bava
- Kalaranjini
- Maya Viswanath
- Geetha Salam as Govindan
- Beena Anthony as Bhanu
- Krishnapriya as Athira

== Soundtrack ==
The music was composed by Mohan Sitara and released under the audio label Satyam Audios.

- "Enikkanu Nee" – Asha Madhu, Afsal
- "Achante Ponnumale" – K. J. Yesudas
- "Kattayee Veeshum" – George Peter
- "Sandhyayam" – Rachana John
- "Kuttanatile" – Anandaraj
- "Enikkanu Nee" [M] – Afsal
- "Achanteponnu" – Mohan Sithara

== Reception ==
A critic from Nowrunning wrote that "To sum up, "Hridayathil Sookshikkan" is an avoidable film by all parameters". A critic from webindia123 wrote that "The story doesn't have any originality and has some similarity to the English movie Meet The Parents. The movie pretends to be about a love story of a young couple but the director keeps that theme on the surface and brings in a family drama which spoils the whole thing. It is a silly movie with a silly theme".

== Home media ==
The film premiered on Mazhavil Manorama on 6 November 2015 at 1:00 p.m.
