= Richa Panai =

Indian actress

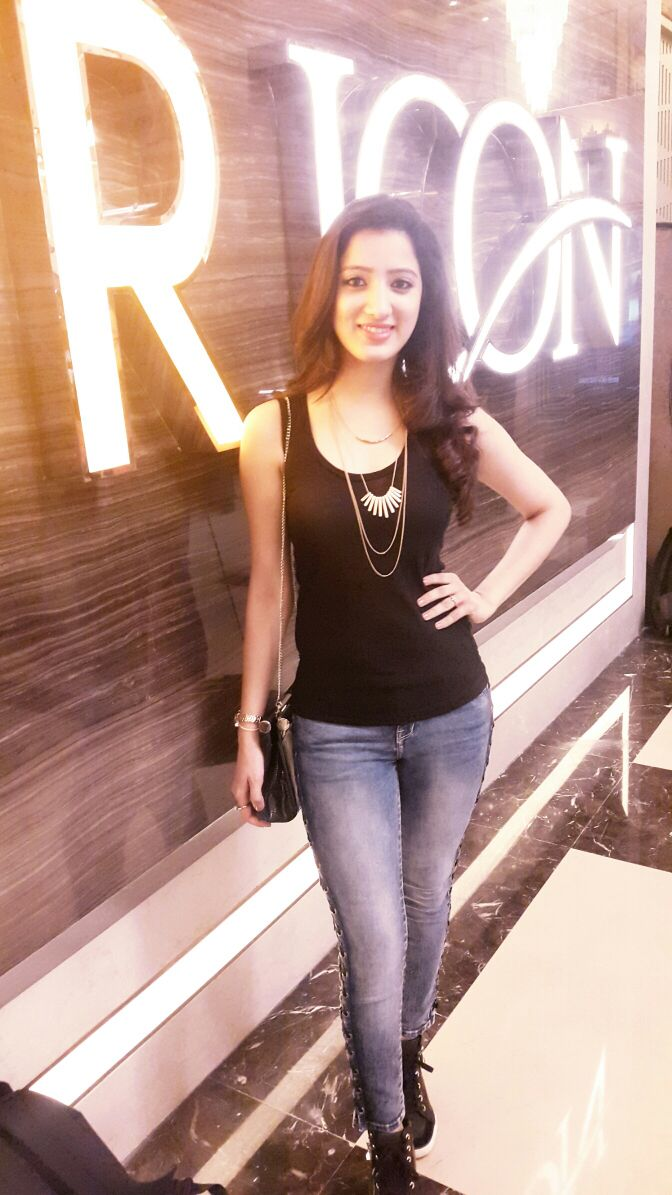
- Richa Panai ready for Traffic screening
- Born: 24 February 1993 (age 33); Lucknow, Uttar Pradesh, India
- Occupation: Film actress
- Years active: 2011–present
- Parent: Shakuntla Panai
- Relatives: Ravi Panai (brother)

Richa Panai is an actress who appears in Mollywood, Tollywood, Bollywood and various ads. Richa Panai came to prominence as a model in advertisements for the Indian jewellery company Bhima Jewellery.

== Career ==
Richa was brought up in Lucknow. Since her school days, she wanted to be an actress. After completing her 12th Standard she won the Miss Lucknow title after which she decided to get into modelling. However, initial days of modelling was a struggle.

After she did a correspondence course and graduated from Delhi University, she became an air hostess with Kingfisher Airlines. Jabbar Kalarakkal gave her first ad film. She starred in a few Malayalam ads and soon, she made her film debut too.

She made her debut in the 2011 Malayalam film Vaadamalli. In the same year, she starred in two other Malayalam films, Bangkok Summer and Sandwich opposite Unni Mukundan and Kunchako Boban respectively. Richa won the Asianet Film Awards for Best New Face of the Year '12 (Female).

She was next seen with Allari Naresh in her first Telugu film Yamudiki Mogudu. She made her debut in Kannada film industry in 2015 and was cast along with Golden Star Ganesh in Buguri. She made her Bollywood debut with Traffic. Ensemble cast of Manoj Bajpayee, Jimmy Shergill, Divya Dutta and others. She was also seen in Telugu movie, Eedu Gold Ehe, starring Sunil.

She also filmed a multi cast Malayalam movie Crossroad (Lakehouse) that hit theaters in 2017.

== Filmography ==
Year	Film	Role	Language	Notes
2011	Vaadamalli	Vrindha	Malayalam	Asianet Film Award for Best New Face of the Year - Female
2011	Bangkok Summer	Ganga	Malayalam	
2011	Sandwich	Shruthi	Malayalam	
2012	Yamudiki Mogudu	Yamaja	Telugu	Telugu debut
2013	Manasunu Maaya Seyake	Mythili	Telugu	Guest Role
2014	Nayattu		Malayalam	
2014	Second Innings		Malayalam	
2014	Chandamama Kathalu	Haseena	Telugu	
2015	Lava Kusa	Subbalaxmi	Telugu	
2015	Buguri	Nandini	Kannada	Kannada Debut
2016	Traffic	Shweta	Hindi	Hindi Debut
2016	Eedu Gold Ehe	Sanjana	Telugu	
2017	Rakshaka Bhatudu		Telugu	
2017	Crossroad	Aimy	Malayalam	
2023	Circle		Telugu	
