= Nayar (name) =

Nayar or Nayyar is a surname that is found among Khatri community which are majorly Hindus with a minority of Sikhs and Muslims. They belong to the "Sareen" division among the Khatris. They were mostly concentrated in the Majha region especially in the districts of Gujrat, Lahore, Okara, Nankana Sahib and Sialkot before 1947. Nayyar families were known to have been qanungos (governors) in the town of Kunjah in Gujrat district, Punjab.

As a custom, milk is never churned in Nayyar families because one of their ancestors died of drinking whey in which a snake had got accidentally churned.

== Notable people ==
- A. Nayyar (born 1950), Pakistani singer
- Abdul Hameed Nayyar (born 1945), Pakistani nuclear physicist and activist
- Abdul Rahim Nayyar (1833–1948), Pakistani Ahmadiyya missionary
- Adam Nayyar (1948–2008), Pakistani anthropologist and author
- Ajay Nayyar, Indian actor
- Ankur Nayyar (born 1967), Indian actor
- Anil Nayar, Indian squash player
- Anindita Nayar (born 1988), Indian actress
- Anjali Nayar, Canadian journalist
- Anuj Nayyar (1975–1999), Indian army officer
- Baldev Raj Nayar (1931–2021), Indian-Canadian political scientist
- Deepak Nayyar (born 1946), Indian professor of Economics
- Dewan Mokham Chand Nayyar (1750–1814), General of the Sikh Empire
- Falguni Nayar (born 1963), Indian businesswoman
- Harsh Nayyar, Indian actor
- Jagdish Nayar, Indian politician
- Kuldip Nayar (born 1923), Indian journalist
- Kunal Nayyar (born 1981), Indian-American actor
- Manu Nayyar (born 1964), Indian cricketer
- Mira Nair (born 1957), American filmmaker
- Mudit Nayar, Indian actor
- Nasir Abbas Nayyar (born 1965), Pakistani writer
- Neeraj Nayar (born 1971), Indian politician
- Nisha Nayar, British actress
- O. P. Nayyar (1926–2007), Indian film music director
- Pawan Nayyar, Indian politician
- Pyarelal Nayyar (1899–1982), Gandhi's personal secretary
- Rajat Nayyar, also known as Roger Nair, Canadian producer
- Rajeev Nayyar (born 1968), Indian cricketer
- Rana Nayar (born 1957), Indian writer and translator
- R. K. Nayyar (1930–1995), Indian director and producer
- Sharif Nayyar (1922–2007), Pakistani director
- Suhail Nayyar, (born 1989), Indian Bollywood actor
- Sushila Nayyar (1914–2000), Mahatma Gandhi's personal secretary and physician
- Vineet Nayyar (1937–2024), Indian businessman
- V. K. Nayar (?-2015), Indian soldier and governor

== See also ==
- Nayar (disambiguation)
