= A. M. Nair =

Indian independence movement activist

Aiyappan Pillai Madhavan Nair (1905–1990), also known as Nair-san, was closely involved with the Indian independence movement in Japan during the 1920s through the 1940s.

== History ==
Nair did his basic schooling in Trivandrum (present Thiruvananthapuram), the capital city of Kerala in southern India. Nair had to leave India at 18 as he led protests against the administrative steps taken by the education authorities in Travancore. At that time he had also spoken against the British. He studied engineering in Japan at Kyoto University. After a short stint as an engineer he entered India's Freedom Struggle in his own individual capacity and soon teamed up with Rash Behari Bose. When Japan joined the Second World War, Nair helped found the Indian Independence League in Japan under Rash Behari Bose and later he and Rash Behari Bose advised the Japanese Government to bring Subhas Chandra Bose to Japan. When Subhas came he helped him in various ways.

In 1949, Nair founded an Indian restaurant in Ginza, Tokyo. In 1982, he wrote his autobiography title An Indian Freedom Fighter in Japan: Memoirs of A.M. Nair (1982) Sole distributorship, Ashok Uma Publications ISBN 0-86131-339-9

== Last years ==
Nair was awarded the Order of the Sacred Treasure (Zuihō-shō) by Emperor Hirohito in November 1984. He died on 22 April 1990.

== Film ==
A film titled Nair-san (Unproduced film) starring Mohanlal and Jackie Chan has been planned based on his life, directed by Alberrt Antoni. However, the film has been shelved.

== Autobiography ==
- An Indian Freedom Fighter in Japan: Memoirs of A.M. Nair (1982) Sole distributorship, Ashok Uma Publications ISBN 0-86131-339-9
