= Cherukkanum Pennum =

Indian Malayalam language romantic thriller film

- Directed by: Pradeep Nair
- Screenplay by: Pradeep Nair; Rajesh Varma
- Story by: Pradeep Nair
- Produced by: Saji Nanthiyattu
- Starring: Sreejith Vijay; Deepthi Nambiar
- Cinematography: Manoj Mundayat
- Edited by: Johnkutty
- Music by: Ratheesh Vega; Arun Sidharrth
- Production company: Nanthiyattu Films
- Release date: 31 October 2025
- Country: India
- Language: Malayalam

Cherukkanum Pennum (transl. A boy and a girl) is a 2025 Indian Malayalam language romantic thriller film, written and directed by Pradeep Nair. The film stars Sreejith Vijay and Deepthi Nambiar (in her Malayalam debut).

Though the film's announcement and filming took place in 2012, it got stuck in development hell, and was revived only in 2025.

== Summary ==
Cherukkanum Pennum tells the story of IT professional and portrays the unexpected events unfolded soon after the marriage of an IT couple, pushing them to the extent to reveal the depth of their love, a fake or real one.

== Cast ==
- Sreejith Vijay as Balu
- Deepthi Nambiar as Ritha
- Dileesh Pothan
- Riya Saira
- Ahmed Sidhique
- Midhun Nalini

== Production ==
The film was announced in January 2012 with a photo shoot held in Kochi. The original crew included Filmbuff Productions as the film production studio. According to Pradeep Nair, the film is about "how quickly they [young people] get into one [relationship] and then get out of it even faster". Tamil actress Deepthi Nambiar made her Malayalam debut through this film and shot for it alongside two films including Thuppakki and a Vincent Selva film. According to Deepthi, the role was attractive and she was keen to do more Malayalam films.

== Soundtrack ==
The music was composed by Ratheesh Vega and Sidharrth Arun with lyrics by Rafeeq Muhammed and Shivaprasad.

== Release ==
The film did not meet its expected release date of Vishu 2012 and was expected to release at the end of 2012, which did not happen. The film was only released on 31 October 2025 after a thirteen-year delay when Saji Nanthiyattu, former film chamber general secretary, took over as producer.
