= K. K. Haridas =

Indian film director (1965–2018)

- Born: 7 September 1965; Pathanamthitta, Kerala, India
- Died: 26 August 2018 (aged 52); Kochi, Kerala, India
- Occupation: Film director
- Years active: 1994–2015
- Spouse: Anitha Haridas
- Children: Haritha, Suryadas
- Parent(s): Kunjukunju, Sarojini
- Relatives: Kannur Rajan (brother-in-law)

K. K. Haridas (7 September 1965 – 26 August 2018) was an Indian film director in Malayalam cinema. His best known works are Vadhu Doctoranu, Kakkakum Poochakkum Kalyanam and Kinnam Katta Kallan.

== Life ==
Haridas was born to Kunjukunju and Sarojini in Mylapra village in Pathanamthitta district, Kerala, India. Haridas was married to Anitha and the couple have two children—Haritha and Suryadas. Music composer Kannur Rajan was his brother-in-law. Haridas died on 26 August 2018 (aged 52) at a hospital in Kochi due to cardiac arrest.

== Partial filmography ==
Year	Title	Notes
1994	Vadhu Doctoranu	
1995	Kokkarakko	
1995	Kakkakum Poochakkum Kalyanam	
1996	Kinnam Katta Kallan	
1997	Kalyanappittannu	
1997	Ikkareyanente Manasam	
1999	Onnaamvattam Kandappol	
2000	Ee Mazha Then Mazha	
2004	C. I. Mahadevan 5 Adi 4 Inchu	
2005	Vacation	
2005	Maanikyan	Shot in 2003; delayed release
2008	Gopalapuranam	
2012	Josettante Hero	
2015	3 Wicketinnu 365 Runs	Shot in 2000; delayed release
