= Adhe Neram Adhe Idam =

- Theatrical release poster
- Directed by: M. Prabhu
- Written by: M. Prabhu; Lalithanand (dialogues)
- Produced by: Rama Krishnan
- Starring: Jai; Vijayalakshmi; Rahul Madhav
- Cinematography: Sri Pawan Sekhar
- Edited by: G. B. Venkatesh
- Music by: Songs: Premji Amaran; Score: Sabesh–Murali
- Production company: Lakshmi Pictures
- Release date: 6 November 2009
- Country: India
- Language: Tamil

Adhe Neram Adhe Idam (transl. Same Time, Same Place) is a 2009 Indian Tamil-language romance film written and directed by M. Prabhu and produced by Rama Krishnan. The film stars Jai, Vijayalakshmi and Rahul Madhav in lead roles, with the latter made his debut through the film, while Nizhalgal Ravi, and Lollu Sabha Jeeva play supporting roles. The music was composed by Premji Amaren with editing by G. B. Venkatesh and cinematography by Sri Pawan Sekhar. The film was released on 6 November 2009.

== Plot ==
Karthik falls in love with Janani. Although she is reluctant at first, she later reciprocates his feelings. After Janani's approval, Karthik goes to Australia as per his father's desire to finish his education. While he is gone, Janani's parents arrange another groom for her, Siva. Janani thinks that Siva is richer and more handsome and she would live a better life with him; therefore, she agrees to marry him. However, fate plays with them again. When Karthik is coming back from Australia, he meets a man. He chats with the man, and they soon become friends. He tells the man about his love story and how his lover had betrayed him for someone "better". The man tells him that the best way to teach her a lesson is to show vengeance and ruin her life. As a result of the man's advice, Karthik seeks revenge and forces Janani to sleep with him and other malicious actions. As the film progresses, the major plot twist is that the man that Karthik had met was actually Siva, who had been both a barrier and facilitator for their love to become united. In the climax, Janani tries to sleep with Karthik after being disappointed with Siva. However, in a sudden turn of events, Karthik kills her for betrayal but regrets it, later commits suicide by shoot himself. Siva goes back sadly after coming to know that Janani is no more.

== Cast ==
- Jai as Karthik
- Vijayalakshmi as Janani
- Rahul Madhav as Siva
- Nizhalgal Ravi as Karthik's father
- Lollu Sabha Jeeva as Jeeva

== Soundtrack ==
The songs were composed by Premgi Amaren.

All lyrics are written by Lalithanand.

Track listing
No.	Title	Singer(s)	Length
1.	"Toshiba"	Premgi Amaren	4:52
2.	"Mudhal Murai"	Harini, Tippu, Haricharan	4:59
3.	"Vennilavu"	Saindhavi, Vijay Yesudas, Tanvi Shah	4:50
4.	"Athu Oru Kaalam"	Haricharan, Raju Krishnamurthy, Premji Amaren	4:39
5.	"Nammoru Chennaiyila"	Venkat Prabhu	5:04
Total length:			24:24

== Critical reception ==
Sify stated that the film "defies all logic" and "The director?s desire for experimentation and the urge to break moulds blow up on his face as he has no proper script". Pavithra Srinivasan of Rediff.com wrote, "The real blame for such slipshod work must undoubtedly rest with the director, though this could easily have been a taut, superbly crafted emotional thriller. Instead, there's a serious dearth of logic, completely senseless characterisation and a climax that leaves you as puzzled as amused." Bhama Devi Ravi of The Times of India wrote that "the interesting plot suffers from a lack of depth". Malathi Rangarajan of The Hindu wrote, "Listing the loopholes is a futile exercise, and anyway there are one too many. Suffice it to say that ANAI is an example of time, talent and labour gone waste".
