= Ullam (2005 film) =

- Directed by: M. D. Sukumaran
- Produced by: Shajan Thottathil
- Starring: Suresh Gopi; Geetu Mohandas; Kalasala Babu; Tony
- Cinematography: Saloo George
- Music by: Kaithapram
- Release date: 8 May 2005
- Country: India
- Language: Malayalam

Ullam is a 2005 Indian Malayalam film, directed by M. D. Sukumaran (in his directorial debut). The film stars Suresh Gopi, Geetu Mohandas, Kalasala Babu and Tony in lead roles. The film had musical score by Kaithapram.

== Cast ==
- Suresh Gopi as Kuttan
- Geetu Mohandas as Radha
- Kalasala Babu as Raman Nair
- Tony as Divakaran
- Vijayaraghavan as Maash
- Master Deepak as Appukuttan
- Bindu Ramakrishnan
- Shantha Devi as Muthassi
- Suraj Venjaramoodu

== Accolades ==
- Nominated – Malayalam Cinema Best Actor Award – Suresh Gopi (also for Makalkku)
