= Pradeep Nair =

Indian Malayali filmmaker

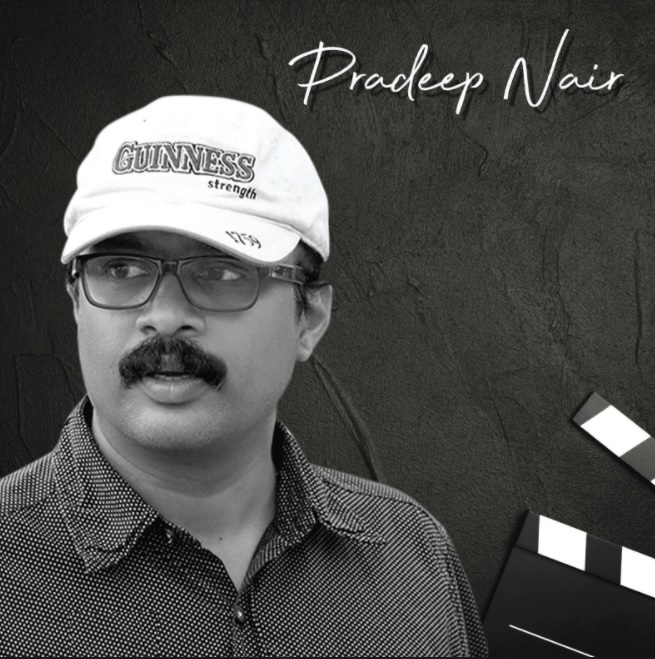
- Born: Kottayam, Kerala, India
- Occupations: Director; Screenwriter; Producer
- Years active: 1997–present
- Known for: Oridam

Pradeep Nair, is an Indian filmmaker from Kerala, who predominantly works in the Malayalam film industry. He has directed various award-winning documentaries.

His directorial debut , Oridam (2005) won him Special Jury Award for director at 52nd National Film Awards and won 5 Kerala State Film Awards in 2005.

Nair is also the author of two books on cinema, Koottu Chernnulla Kali :Chalachithra Vicharangal (2022) and Drushya Mohanam :Samvidhayakan Mohante Chalachithra Kala (2024).

Nair has also served as the Central Panel jury member at the 71st National Film Awards

== Career ==
After directing several documentaries, Nair released Oridam, followed by Crossroad (2017), an anthology film in which, Kodeshyan was said to "stand out". His Cherukkanum Pennum had a delayed release in 2025.

== Filmography ==
=== Feature films ===
| Year | Title | Language | Credited as | Notes |
|---|---|---|---|---|
| 2004 | Oridam | Malayalam | Writer, director, producer | 1 National award, 5 State awards IFFK |
| 2017 | Cross Road | Malayalam | Director | Helmed the Kodeshyan segment |
| 2025 | Cherukkanum Pennum | Malayalam | Writer, Director | |

=== Documentaries ===
| Year | Title | Language | Credited as | Notes |
|---|---|---|---|---|
| 2024 | Satwikam | Malayalam | Writer, director, producer | |
| 2021 | Ahead of | Malayalam | Director | |
| 2020 | K. M. Roy:A Ray of Light | Malayalam | Writer, Director | Film on veteran journalist K. M. Roy Produced by Kerala Medical Academy |
| 2019 | Maa Do Not Any More | Malayalam | Director | |
| 2018 | Kadamman: Prakruthiyude Padayanikkaran | Malayalam | Writer, Co Director | |
| 2015 | Kuttanad; Oru Apoorva Marutha Thina | Malayalam | Writer, director | Film on Heritage of Kuttanad, Produced by I&PRD, Govt of Kerala. |
| 2011 | Thelicham | Malayalam | Writer, director | A Production for Fisheries Dept, Govt of Kerala, Produced by K S F D C |
| 2009 | Veedu Nashttapetta Kuttikal | Malayalam | Writer, director | |
| 2006 | Glimpses of Kerala | Malayalam | Director | about Cultural, Historical places in Kerala-Project Commissioned by Malayala Manorama. |
| 2005 | Listen to Children | Malayalam | Writer, director | a production for UNICEF |
| 2001 | When The Labour Labours | Malayalam | Writer, director | Film on Independent Labour movement in Maharashtra, funded by Maharashtra Labour Union (MLU) |
| 1999 | A Neorealistic Dream | Malayalam | Writer, director | Film on India's first neorealistic film Newspaper Boy and its Director P. Ramdas. IFFK |
| 1997 | Light in the Darkness | Malayalam | Director | A promotional documentary about cure for AIDS. |
| 1997 | Man V/S Nature: The Struggle Eternal | Malayalam | Writer, director, producer | Film on Land slides in Highranges of Kerala. |

== Awards ==
National Film Awards:

- 2005 – Special Jury Award for director – Oridam

Kerala State Film Awards:

- Special Jury Award in Direction - Oridam (2005)
- Best Actress - Geethu Mohandas - Oridam
- Best Background Score - Isaac Thomas Kottukapally - Oridam
- Best Costume Design - Kumar Edappal - Oridam
- Best Film Processing - Oridam

Kerala Film Critics Awards

- Best Debut Director - Oridam (2005)

Kerala State Television Awards:

- Best Documentary - Kuttanad: Oru Apoorva Marutha Thina (2015)
