= Preethi Nair =

British author of Indian heritage (born 1971)

- Born: 1971; Kerala
- Occupation: author

Preethi Nair (born 1971) is a British author of Indian heritage. Born in Kerala, India, she came to the United Kingdom as a child. She worked as a management consultant, but gave up her job to become a writer.

Preethi Nair's first novel, Gypsy Masala, was rejected by several publishers. She then set up her own publishing company and PR agency, Nine Fish, in Northampton, to publish and promote the book.

She created an alter ego, Pru Menon, in order to publicize the book, and went on to sign a three-book deal with HarperCollins.

== Works ==
- Gypsy Masala
- 100 Shades of White
- The Colour of Love / Beyond Indigo
