= S R Nair =

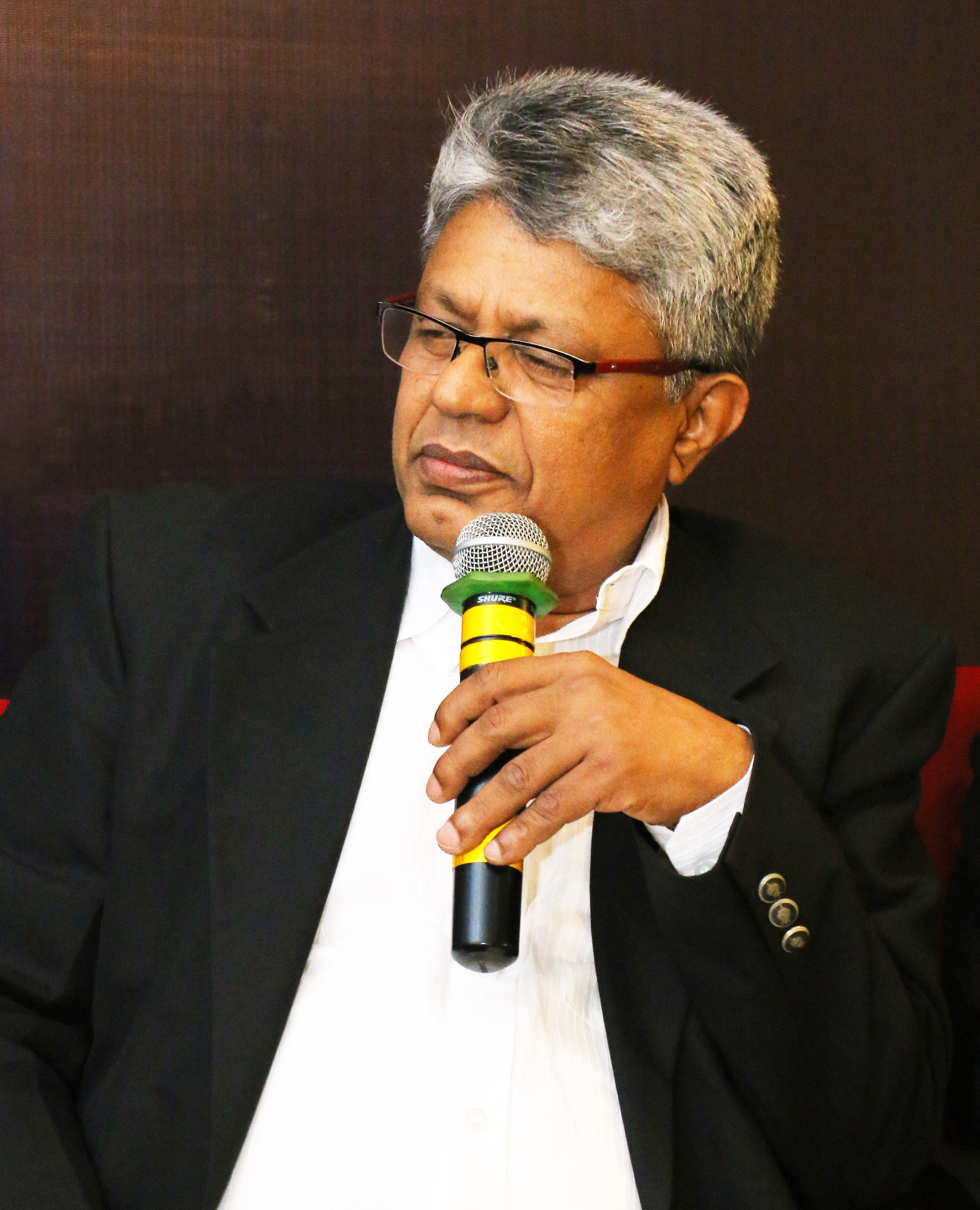
- SR Nair in a panel discussion of the Kerala Management Association
- Born: Sreedharan Radhakrishnan Nair; 31 May 1959 (age 67); Pallipuram, Kerala, India
- Occupations: Entrepreneur, author, adjunct professor, mentor
- Organizations: Chaired: Kerala Management Association (2004), (2013); The Indus Entrepreneurs (TiE) Kerala Chapter (2003); Indian Society of Training & development, Kochi Chapter (2011–2013); Founder Secretary Better Kochi Response Group – (2008–2012); Rotary Cochin International 2002
- Known for: Start-up business, mentoring, public speaking
- Awards: Award from Governor of Kerala for spearheading management movement in the State (2008); IT Man of the Year from Kerala Sahridaya Vedi (2013); Kerala State Productivity Council Award(2000); CRN Award for Best IT entrepreneurship in Kerala (2011); Best District Secretary Rotary District 3200 (2000)
- Website: www.srnairblog.blogspot.com

Sreedharan Radhakrishnan Nair (born 31 May 1959), known as SR, is a serial entrepreneur, author, adjunct professor and a mentor. Having chaired several professional and non-governmental organisations in Kerala, India such as the Kerala Management Association, Indian Society for Training and Development, The Indus Entrepreneurs (TiE) (Kochi Chapter), Rotary Cochin International and having co-founded the Better Kochi Response Group, he is well known in business, social, academic and professional circles in the state of Kerala. He is a known public speaker who provides counsel to several governmental, educational and non-governmental organisations and individuals in areas such as management, entrepreneurship, marketing and technology.

== Biography ==
Born to KPS Nair and Janakikutty Amma in Trivandrum district, Kerala; SR has three brothers and an elder sister. He did his schooling in his home town, higher studies in St Xavier's College (1976) and graduated with a Bachelor of Physics from Mahatma Gandhi College, Trivandrum in 1979. While in employment, he also completed his MBA from Punjab University through the evening program in 1984. SR started his career in 1980 as a Sales Engineer in Century Instruments Limited at Chandigarh. The job entailed him to travel across India which he did several times. He considers the travel as the best learning phase of his life. In 1985 he moved on and joined Hindustan Computers Limited & its assigns and for the next 11 years, worked in Chandigarh, Delhi, Cochin and Bangalore in various capacities such as Regional Manager, Product Manager & National Manager (Distribution). In 1996, SR returned to Cochin, Kerala and started his entrepreneurial venture founding an IT system integration company by the name Team Frontline Limited. In times to come, he went on creating more enterprises such as Alltime Power Technologies Private Limited, Team e-biz Limited & Stallion System & Solutions Private Limited. After being in entrepreneurship for 20 years, SR moved on to become a CEO Mentor for start-up and early ventures by co-founding Mentorguru Professional Services Private Limited where he spends his energies now. SR Nair is an adjunct professor at the Indian Institute of Management, Kozhikode since 2012 where he teaches Entrepreneurship. He is also an adjunct professor at the Indian Maritime University, Kochi campus where he imparts Strategic Management.

== Professional and social movements ==
Beginning 1996, SR Nair has been active in professional and social movements in Kerala. He had chaired the Kerala Management Association twice in the year 2004 and 2013. He co-founded and chaired The Indus Entrepreneurs (TiE) Kerala Chapter in 2003, that took up mentoring of entrepreneurs as a regular activity. He had chaired the Kochi Chapter of the Indian Society of Training & Development between 2011 and 2013 and has since been a National Council Member. He is a co-founder of the Better Kochi Response Group. In the year 2002, he charted Rotary Cochin International and was its founder President. Besides, He was also associated with the Confederation of Indian Industries (CII) & Junior Chamber International. SR also was a director in Kerala Venture Capital Fund (KVCF) started by the Government of Kerala and is an independent director at Manappuram Comptech and Consultants Limited. Nair serves the Seed Funding Committee of Kerala State Industrial Development Corporation (KSIDC) as an expert member.

== Family ==
SR Nair is married to Shaleena Nair. The couple have two children, Naomi and Aditya.

== Public speaking, training and writing ==
SR Nair is a public speaker and debater and often appears in print and electronic media on various contemporary topics, in addition to partaking in keynote speaking and training for podiums such as Kerala Management Association, National Institute Personnel Management, Indian Society for Training Development, TiE, Ministry of Micro, Small and Medium Institute, Naval Training Institute, Universities and other academic & research institutions. He spends his spare time in providing career guidance to students of lesser means in suburban and village schools. Rotary Cochin International chartered by him conducts an annual youth festival and competition, titled ‘Bhavana’ among special schools of the state and he actively takes part in it, year after year. In 2014, SR authored the book ‘Subhayatra’ (ISBN 978-81-8266-100-4) published by Mathrubhumi Books. SR Nair is a regular blogger (srnairblog.blogspot.com) and an avid traveler. He regularly contributes original articles in research publications and business magazines on IT, management and other contemporary topics.

== Awards and recognition ==
- He received Award from Governor of Kerala for spearheading management movement in the State in the year 2008
- Kerala Sahridaya Vedi recognized him with IT Man of the year in 2013
- He is the recipient of Kerala State Productivity Council Award in 2000.
- CRN Xcellence Award for Best IT entrepreneurship in Kerala for 2011
- Best District Secretary Award from Rotary District 3200 in the year 2000.
