= Kanne Madanguka =

- Directed by: Alberrt Antoni
- Written by: Alberrt Antoni
- Produced by: Anil Babu Balakrshnan
- Starring: Murali; Navya Nair; Baby Neeraja; Sobha Mohan
- Cinematography: Vaidy S. Pillai
- Edited by: K Sreenivas
- Music by: Jayan Pisharadi
- Release date: 24 April 2005
- Country: India
- Language: Malayalam

Kanne Madanguka is a 2005 Malayalam language film directed by Alberrt Antoni. This is one of the seven Malayalam films that won a place in the Indian Panorama 2005.

Navya Nair won the Kerala State Film Award for her portrayal of Karunya. Baby Neeraja who played Sowmya also won the state award for best child artist. This film was also opened to a full house at IFFI 2005.

== Plot ==
One day while Bhagyanathan is lying in a cot in the verandah of his hut, his two daughters Karunya and Sowmya came in the morning to say bye while they are going out and his eyes swell with tears. This is because Sowmya is going to school while Karunya, who was the rank holder in her class is going to work in a small weaving company owned by a relative. Bhagyanathan and his wife Vishalam are quarry workers toiling under the sun doing hard labor. With their meager income they want to give excellent education and make life comfortable for their children. One day Bhagyanathan's legs are hurt in an accident and the doctor tells him that he can no longer work. The relative then offers a job for Karunya in his company and when Karunya had to go to work because of him, it became unbearable to Bhagyanathan.

Karunya works hard and pays her sister's fees regularly. One day the relative comes with another offer. They want to send few girls to the Gulf to work in a garment company. The pay would be excellent and the accommodation would be arranged by the company. Bhagyanathan does not think for a moment and says no. Vishalam meanwhile, influenced by other women, convince him to send her. From Gulf, Karunya starts sending money regularly and gifts for her parents. The first gift is a wheelchair for her father. With the rest of the money they remodel the house and buy good dresses. The gifts and letter are delivered by the relative who had sent her to work.

It seemed like life was good when one day people of the village spot a story about a girl arrested in a mobile prostitution ring in Nargecoil. The girl has a resemblance to Karunya. Bhagyanathan abuses the person who bought him the news and throws out the newspaper. Vishalam meanwhile is not convinced. She goes to the police station in Nagercoil to meet the girl called Swetha. It turns out that she is Karunya. She refuses to identify her mother and speaks to her in Tamil, but when the mother turns back, she cries and the movie ends.

== Cast ==
- Navya Nair as Karunya
- Murali as Bhagyanathan
- Shobha Mohan as Visalakshi
- Baby Neeraja as Sowmya
- Vinu Mohan as Harikumar
- Anu Mohan as Nassar
