= Alberrt Antoni =

Indian film director

Antony Albert
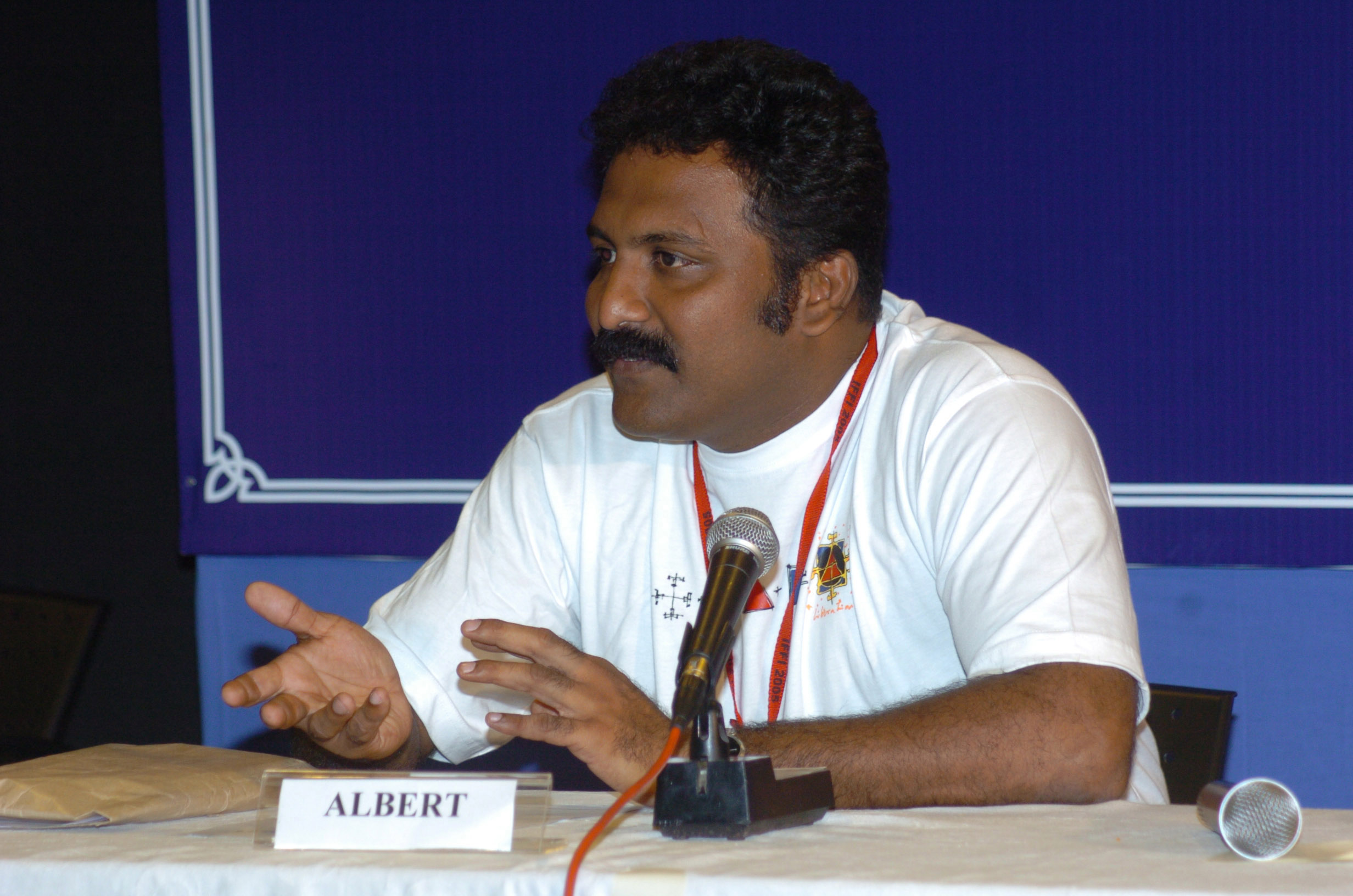
- Antony at the IFFI (2005)
- Born: Agra, Uttar Pradesh, India
- Other name: Albert
- Occupation: Filmmaker
- Years active: 2008
- Awards: See Awards section

Antony Albert is an Indian film director. His debut film as a director is critically acclaimed Kanne Madanguka (2005). He is the director of Nairsan, a forthcoming Indo-Japanese historical film, based on the legendary Indian freedom fighter A. M. Nair, popularly known as Nairsan in Japan, with the rare combination of Jackie Chan, Mohanlal and A. R. Rahman.

== Biography ==
Albert is now in Mudavanmugal, Trivandrum, Kerala, and he was born in Agra, Uttar Pradesh. Albert native and did his schooling in Marthandam and took his bachelor's degree from University, Hyderabad and from the Govt. Film Institute of Chennai.

Albert's debut film Kanne Madanguka (2005) was selected for Indian Panorama 2005 screened at the International Film Festival of India, Goa (2005) and other overseas film festivals 2005–2006. It won three Kerala State Film Awards for Best Actress, Best child artiste and Best processing.

Albert was the driving force behind the development of Nairsan, having invested significant time and resources in researching the project, securing rights, and arranging financial support. The film was planned as an international co-production featuring Mohanlal, Jackie Chan and the Academy Award winner A. R. Rahman, with principal locations in Japan, Mongolia and India. The project was conceived as a large-budget production.

His work on the film earned several awards, including the Aravindan Puraskaram Best Debut Director Award in 2005, Padmarajan Special Jury Award for best director (2006) and John Abraham special Jury Award (2005). His involvement in Nairsan reflected an interest in exploring its historical and cultural themes, with the project conceived as an international production spanning multiple cultures, languages, and religious traditions.

Now he is in the post production work for his new project titled Vaadamalli. New faces are doing the central characters.

Now he is in the post production work for his new project titled NAIRSAN. A complete Hollywood movie.

== Filmography ==
Film	Year	Screenwriter	Cast	Language	Music	Remarks
Kanne Madanguka	2005	Antony Albert	Murali, Navya Nair	Malayalam	Jayan Pisharady	Won three State Awards 2005; Aravindan Puraskaram 2005; Padmarajan Special Jury Award – 2005; John Abhraham Special Jury Award 2005; Selected for Indian Panorama 2005; Screened at IFFI Goa 2005
Vaadamalli	2011	Rajesh Varma	Rahul Madhav, Richa Panai, Ramesh Raveendran, Niji Mary, Pradeep Chandran, Jyothy	Malayalam	Shyam	Asianet Film Awards for Best Newcomer – Richa Panai
Mudra, The Gesture – Short fiction	2017	Albert	Isha Talwar, Anjali Nair			
The Journey	2023	Antony Albert	Amaya Prasad, LR Jayesh, Noorjahan	Malayalam	Viswajith CT	The Journey" a project that values experimentation, naturalism, and inclusivity. The combination of technical choices, and the casting of a Trans woman in the lead role suggests a commitment to breaking traditional filmmaking norms and exploring new ways of storytelling. Remarks Best Director Finalist 'CANNES CONTINENTAL FILM FESTIVAL'

=== Story ===
- Kanne Madanguka (2005)
- Vaadamalli (2011)
- Mudra, The Gesture – Short fiction (2017)
- The Journey (2023)

== Awards ==
Aravindan Puraskaram

- 2005: Best debut director award for Kanne Madanguka

Padmarajan Special Jury Award

- 2006: Best Director Award for Kanne Madanguka

John Abraham Special Jury Award

- 2005: Best Director Award for Kanne Madanguka
