= Vijayaraghavan =

Indian actor (born 1950)

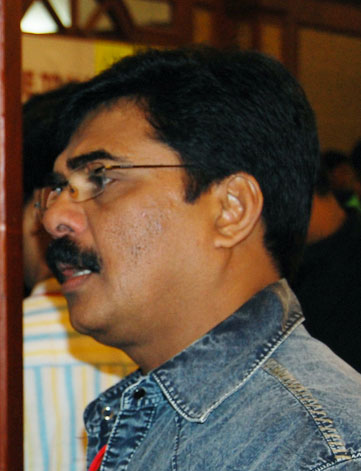
- Born: Narayana Pillai Vijayaraghavan; 12 January 1950 (age 76); Kuala Lumpur, Federation of Malaya
- Other names: Kuttan, Kuttettan
- Occupation: Actor
- Years active: 1973–present
- Works: Full list
- Spouse: Anitha
- Children: 2
- Parent(s): N. N. Pillai; Chinnamma

Narayana Pillai Vijayaraghavan (born 12 January 1950), known mononymously as Vijayaraghavan, is an Indian actor who predominantly works in Malayalam cinema. He is known for his character roles. He is the son of drama and cinema artist N. N. Pillai.

== Early life and family ==
Vijayaraghavan was born on 12 January 1950 to N. N. Pillai and Chinnamma at Kuala Lumpur, Federation of Malaya, where his father worked as an Estate Manager. He has two sisters Sulochana and Renuka. He had his primary education from Govt. High School, Kudamaloor.

== Personal life ==
He is married to Anitha (Suma) on 21 August 1978 and they have 2 sons. The elder son, Jinadevan is a businessman and is married to Rakhi. The younger son, Devadevan is in film industry. He is settled at Olassa, Kottayam district, Kerala.

== Television ==
- Crime Branch (Kairali TV)
- Kaavyanjali (Surya TV)
- Snehatheeram (Surya TV)

== Awards ==
Award	Year	Category	Film	Ref.
Kerala State Film Awards	2024	Best Character Actor	Pookkaalam	
National Film Awards	2025	Best Actor in a Supporting Role	Pookkaalam	
Filmfare Awards South	2026	Best Supporting Actor – Malayalam	Kishkindha Kaandam	
