= Rosshan Andrrews =

Indian film director (born 1975)

- Born: Roshan Andrews; 6 January 1975 (age 51); Thrissur, Kerala, India
- Occupation: Director
- Years active: 1997–present
- Spouse: Ancy Joseph
- Children: 3

Rosshan Andrrews (born 6 January 1975) is an Indian film director who mainly works in Malayalam cinema.

== Biography ==
Rosshan Andrrews was born to Burney and Andrews of the Moolakuzhi Nedumparampil house in Thrissur. He attended St. Aloysious Thrissur and Cochin College, Ernakulam.

== Personal life ==
Rosshan is married to Ancy Joseph and the couple has three children: Anjelina, Ryan and Ana Bella.

== Career ==
His debut film was the 2005 Malayalam film Udayananu Tharam starring Mohanlal and Meena. After the success of the film, Rosshan Andrrews directed his next film in 2006 named Notebook. The film had newcomers Mariya Roy, Parvathy, Roma and Skanda Ashok.

He made his Hindi debut with Deva (2025) starring Shahid Kapoor and Pooja Hegde and produced by Roy Kapur Films and Zee Studios. It was a remake of his own film Mumbai Police (2013) with the story written by Bobby–Sanjay, who returned as screenwriters for Deva.

== Awards ==
Kerala State Film Awards

- 2005 – Kerala State Film Award for Best Debut Director – Udayananu Tharam
- 2006 – Kerala State Film Award for Second Best Film – Notebook
- 2009 – Kerala State Film Award for Best Popular Film – Evidam Swargamanu

Filmfare Awards South

- 2006 – Filmfare Award for Best Film – Malayalam – Notebook
- 2006 – Filmfare Award for Best Director – Malayalam – Notebook

== Filmography ==
=== As director ===
Year	Film	Writer	Language	Notes
2005	Udayananu Tharam	Sreenivasan	Malayalam	
2006	Notebook	Bobby-Sanjay	Malayalam	
2009	Evidam Swargamanu	James Albert	Malayalam	
2012	Casanovva	Bobby-Sanjay	Malayalam	
2013	Mumbai Police	Bobby-Sanjay	Malayalam	
2014	How Old Are You?	Bobby-Sanjay	Malayalam	
2015	36 Vayadhinile	Bobby-Sanjay	Tamil	Remake of How Old Are You?
2016	School Bus	Bobby-Sanjay	Malayalam	
2018	Kayamkulam Kochunni	Bobby-Sanjay	Malayalam	
2019	Prathi Poovankozhi	Unni R.	Malayalam	Also acted in the film. Main Protagonist In The Film.
2022	Salute	Bobby–Sanjay	Malayalam	
2022	Saturday Night	Naveen Bhaskar	Malayalam	
2025	Deva	Bobby–Sanjay	Hindi	Remake of Mumbai Police

=== Writer ===
Year	Film	Other notes
2005	Udayananu Tharam	Story
2008	Velli Thirai	Story
2012	Casanovva	Story
2014	How Old Are You	Story

=== Actor ===
Year	Film	Role
2006	Pachakuthira	as Himself
2019	Prathi Poovankozhi	Antappan

=== Television shows as judge ===
- Tharolsavam
- Nakshatradeepangal

== Recurring collaborators ==
Films	Mohanlal	Bobby-Sanjay	Gopi Sunder	R. Diwakar	Mahesh Narayanan	Ranjan Abraham
Udayananu Tharam (2005)	check					check
Notebook (2006)		check	check	check		check
Evidam Swargamanu (2009)	check		check	check		check
Casanovva (2012)	check	check	check		check	
Mumbai Police (2013)		check	check	check	check	
How Old Are You (2014)		check	check	check	check	
Kayamkulam Kochunni (2018)	check	check	check			
Deva (2025)		check				
