= Traffic (2011 film) =

2011 Indian film by Rajesh Pillai

- Theatrical official poster
- Directed by: Rajesh Pillai
- Written by: Bobby-Sanjay
- Produced by: Listin Stephen
- Starring: Sreenivasan; Kunchacko Boban; Rahman; Anoop Menon; Vineeth Sreenivasan; Asif Ali; Sandhya; Remya Nambeesan
- Cinematography: Shyju Khalid
- Edited by: Mahesh Narayanan
- Music by: Songs: Mejo Joseph; Samson Kottoor; Background Score: Mejo Joseph
- Production company: Magic Frames
- Distributed by: Magic Frames
- Release date: 7 January 2011
- Running time: 122 minutes
- Country: India
- Language: Malayalam
- Budget: ₹2.75 crores
- Box office: ₹15 crores

Traffic is a 2011 Indian Malayalam-language road thriller film directed by Rajesh Pillai and written by Bobby–Sanjay. It features an ensemble cast of Sreenivasan, Kunchacko Boban, Rahman, Anoop Menon, Vineeth Sreenivasan, Asif Ali, Sandhya, Roma, Remya Nambessan, Lena, and Saikumar. The film tells its story in a hyperlink narrative format.

Traffic was released on 7 January 2011 to positive reviews from critics, and was a commercial success. It has since gained cult status and is widely recognised as being among the first Malayalam New Wave films. A multi-narrative thriller that intertwines multiple stories around one particular incident, Traffic is inspired from a real event that happened in Chennai. It was remade into Tamil as Chennaiyil Oru Naal, in Kannada as Crazy Star and in Hindi, under the same name. The film marked the final appearance of the veteran actor Jose Prakash before his death in 2012.

== Plot ==
On the 16th of September in Kochi, Sidharth Shankar is preparing for the release of his new film; Traffic Constable Sudevan resumes his duty following a suspension for accepting a bribe to pay the fees for his niece's school admission, cardiologist Dr. Abel is celebrating his first wedding anniversary and Raihan, an aspiring television journalist, starts his new job with an interview with Shankar.

At a crowded traffic jam, Raihan and his friend Rajeev, who were travelling together on a bike are hit by a speeding car at the signal. At the same junction in another car is Abel and his friend, Jikku.

On the other hand, Siddharth's daughter Riya is suffering from a heart condition and her condition deteriorates, making her in need of a heart transplant. Raihan falls into a coma and is declared brain dead, although he is kept alive using a ventilator. Raihan's parents refuse to take their son of the ventilator and donate his heart but reluctantly agree on the persuasion of Rajeev, and Raihan's girlfriend Aditi. However, the heart is unable to be transported from Kochi to Palakkad, as there are no helicopters or flights available due to the weather conditions and time concerns; the only option available is via road.

City Police Commissioner Ajmal Nazar is asked to take charge of the mission, but refuses due to the complexity and risk involved. However, he agrees on the insistence of Dr. Simon D' Souza. No officer is willing to drive the vehicle transporting the heart until Sudevan volunteers, hoping to regain the respect he lost. Accompanying him on the mission are Abel and Rajeev.

The mission goes smoothly at first, until Abel holds Rajeev at knife-point, threatening Sudevan that if he didn't comply he would kill Rajeev, forcing Sudevan to deviate from the highway into a forest. After Rajeev retaliates, Abel calls his sister Miriam, and confesses to running over his wife Shwetha, after finding out that she was having an affair with his friend Jikku and that she may have died, therefore he wishes to save himself from the police. Siddharth then calls Abel and promises to help him, though he is not convinced. Siddharth's frustrated wife Sruthi explains the trauma she has been through because of her daughter's heart condition, and tells him that no other problem could be bigger than this. A finally convinced Abel advises Sudevan and Rajeev to leave without him, however, he is brought along by Sudevan despite being requested by Nazar to have him arrested.

They divert into a road 8 kilometres ahead of the scheduled route, making up for the time they lost. Riya's condition begins to worsen, causing Sudevan to take an alternate route through a communally sensitive area called Bilal Colony, where police are restricted from entering due to its strong minority. Rajeev, who is familiar with the area, helps make way for the vehicle to pass along with help of Thanzeer, Siddharth Shankar's Fan Club President whom Siddharth personally called. Abel also leaves the car to push two vehicles blocking the route. Sudevan drives at a high speed and reaches the hospital on time, covering the 150 kilometer route in an hour and 58 minutes.

Abel is relieved after finding out that Shwetha is in stable condition and has no complaints against him. Rajeev is offered a lift back to Kochi and Raihan's parents accept Aditi and invite her to their home, before doing Raihan's final rites. Riya opens her eyes, much to the relief of her family, and a satisfied Nazar thanks Dr. Simon D'Souza. Sudevan en-route to his home finds a group of people arguing in the middle road over a minor accident, where he signals them to stop, ending the film on a happy note.

== Cast ==
- Sreenivasan as Head Constable Sudevan Nair, Kochi Traffic Police
- Kunchacko Boban as Dr. Abel Thariyan, a cardiologist
- Rahman as Siddharth Shankar
- Anoop Menon as Ajmal Nazeer IPS, City Police Commissioner
- Vineeth Sreenivasan as Raihan Saifudheen, a trainee journalist
- Asif Ali as Rajeev, Raihan's friend
- Sandhya as Adithi, Raihan's girlfriend
- Roma as Mariyam, Abel's sister
- Remya Nambeesan as Shwetha, Abel's wife
- Lena as Shruthi, Siddharth's wife
- Namitha Pramod as Riya, Siddharth's daughter
- Saikumar as Dr. Saifudheen, Raihan's father
- Fathima Babu as Raihan's mother
- Jose Prakash as Dr. Simon D'Souza
- Prem Prakash as Chief Surgeon
- Krishna as Jikku, Abel's friend
- Rony David Raj as Journalist
- Vijayakumar as Mathew, Siddharth's secretary
- Baiju Ezhupunna as Thanzeer, Siddharth Shankar Fan Club Association President
- Nisha Sarang as Sudevan's sister
- Gowri Krishnan as Sudevan's daughter
- Reena Basheer as Sudevan's wife
- Nivin Pauly as a driver (cameo appearance)

== Production ==
Bobby and Sanjay, who scripted Ente Veedu Appuvinteyum and Notebook explained: "The director wanted the film to be of a different mould altogether. Here every character is of equal importance as the story moves ahead. It was quite a challenging task but an enjoyable experience as well." They add that the film is inspired by a true incident. A similar mission was successfully carried out by the Tamil Nadu police in a more complex Chennai city. Also, in a scene, the character played by Anoop Menon talks about the incident.

Traffic is one of the first multi narratives made in this decade in Malayalam film. The film has Sreenivasan, Rahman, Kunchacko Boban and Asif Ali as the four lead protagonists whose stories are narrated through the sequences. On the theme, Rajesh says, "I felt it was a theme that could connect with viewers regardless of their age. It's a contemporary theme that reassures us that if we approach something with honesty, even nature will come to our support." The film will be the second on-screen pairing of Vineeth and Sreenivasan, after their first film Makante Achan.

== Reception ==
=== Critical response ===
The film opened on 7 January 2011 to positive reviews. Veeyen of Nowrunning.com gave the film 3 out of 5 stars, writing, "Rajesh Pillai's Traffic is a brutally brilliant film in which he lends color to coincidence and unveils before us cogitation on the dynamics of chance. A strikingly crafted film that is raw and genuine, it crawls right under your skin and stays there." IndiaGlitz enthusiastically praised the film's "riveting plot, great performances, soulful music... and skillful direction". A review at Cinefundas also praised the acting, adding that "the real hero of the film is the script". Sify.com called it "an overwhelming experience" and rated it as "very good." The Malayalam website Movieraga called it an "excellent movie" and went on to state that the new blood of Malayalam cinema cannot be seen as second-grade any more. The movie was part of the series of movies that began the New Generation Movement.

Traffic was screened in the Malayalam Cinema Today section at the 16th International Film Festival of Kerala (IFFK), in Thiruvananthapuram, Kerala in 2011.

== Box office ==
The film received highly positive reviews and was declared a blockbuster at box office.

== Soundtrack ==
Traffic

Soundtrack album by Mejo Joseph
- Released: 25 December 2010
- Recorded: 2010
- Genre: Film soundtrack
- Length: 25:32
- Language: Malayalam
- Label: Satyam Audios
- Producer: Mejo Joseph

Mejo Joseph chronology
Kanmazha Peyyum Munpe (2010)	Traffic (2010)	Chapters (2012)

All lyrics are written by S. Ramesan Nair except where noted; all music is composed by Samson Kottoor except where noted.

No.	Title	Lyrics	Music	Artists	Length
1.	"Kannerinjal"		Mejo Joseph	Vipin Warrier, Hesham Abdul Wahab
2.	"Pakalin"	Vayalar Sarath Chandra Varma	Mejo Joseph	Sithara
3.	"Unaroo Mizhiyazhake"			Chinmayi
4.	"Unaroo Mizhiyazhake"			Samson Kottoor
5.	"Unaroo Mizhiyazhake" (Instrumental)			Kalyan
6.	"Theme Music" (Instrumental)		Samson Kottoor

== Remakes ==
Year	Film	Language
2013	Chennaiyil Oru Naal	Tamil
2014	Crazy Star	Kannada
2016	Traffic	Hindi

Owing to its critical and commercial success, Traffic was remade in Tamil as Chennaiyil Oru Naal (2013), which was a huge success at box office like Traffic. Kannada remake Crazy Star (2014) received negative reception from both critics and box-office. Traffic's Hindi remake was released in May 2016.

== Awards ==
Award	Category	Result	Recipient	Ref.
Kerala State Film Awards 2011	Best Screenplay	Won	Bobby-Sanjay	
1st South Indian International Movie Awards	Best Director	Won	Rajesh Pillai	
1st South Indian International Movie Awards	Best Actress in a Supporting Role	Won	Lena	
Filmfare Awards South 2012	Best Film	Won	Listin Stephen	
Filmfare Awards South 2012	Best Supporting Actress	Won	Lena Abhilash	
Kerala Film Critics Awards	Best Script	Won	Bobby-Sanjay	
Kerala Film Critics Awards	Second Best Actor – Male	Won	Anoop Menon	
Kerala Film Critics Awards	Second Best Actor – Female	Won	Lena Abhilash	
Lohithadas Award	Best Script	Won	Bobby-Sanjay	
Asianet Film Awards 2012	Best Film	Nominated	Listin Stephen	
Asianet Film Awards 2012	Best Director	Nominated	Rajesh Pillai	
Asianet Film Awards 2012	Best Screenplay	Won	Bobby-Sanjay	
Asianet Film Awards 2012	Best Supporting Actor	Nominated	Anoop Menon	
Asianet Film Awards 2012	Best Supporting Actress	Nominated	Remya Nambeesan	
Asianet Film Awards 2012	Best Character Actor	Nominated	Sreenivasan	
Asiavision Movie Awards	Best Popular Movie	Won	Listin Stephen	
Asiavision Movie Awards	Second Best Actor	Won	Anoop Menon	
Asiavision Movie Awards	Best Screenplay	Won	Bobby-Sanjay	
Asiavision Movie Awards	Special Performance Award	Won	Rahman	
Asiavision Movie Awards	Trendsetter Award	Won	Listin Stephen	
Nana Film Awards	Best Film	Won	Listin Stephen	
Nana Film Awards	Best Director	Won	Rajesh Pillai	
Nana Film Awards	Best Editor	Won	Mahesh Narayanan	
Mathrubhumi Kalyan Silks Film Awards	Best Screenplay	Won	Bobby-Sanjay	
Mathrubhumi Kalyan Silks Film Awards	Best Path Breaking Film of the Year	Nominated	Listin Stephen	
Surya Film Awards	Most Popular Director	Nominated	Rajesh Pillai	
Surya Film Awards	Best Editor	Won	Mahesh Narayanan	
Kochi Times Awards	Best Script	Won	Bobby – Sanjay	
Amrita Film Awards 2012	Best Supporting Actor (Female)	Won	Lena Abhilash	
Amrita Film Awards 2012	Best Script	Won	Bobby-Sanjay	
Amrita Film Awards 2012	Trendsetting Film Director	Won	Rajesh Pillai	
Jaihind Film Awards 2012	Best Director	Won	Rajesh Pillai	
Film Guidance Chalachitra Awards 2011	Best Supporting Actress	Won	Remya Nambeesan	
Reporter TV Film Awards 2012	Best Film	Won	Listin Stephen	
Reporter TV Film Awards 2012	Best Director	Won	Rajesh Pillai	
Reporter TV Film Awards 2012	Best Script	Won	Bobby-Sanjay	
Reporter TV Film Awards 2012	Best Editor	Won	Mahesh Narayanan	
Reporter TV Film Awards 2012	Best Supporting Actress	Won	Lena Abhilash	
Thikkurissy Awards 2011	Best Second Actress	Won	Sandhya	
