= Deva (soundtrack) =

Soundtrack album by Vishal Mishra and Jakes Bejoy
- Released: February 12, 2025
- Recorded: 2023–24
- Genre: Feature film soundtrack
- Length: 10:44
- Language: Hindi
- Label: Zee Music Company

Jakes Bejoy chronology
Identity (2025)	Deva (2025)	Thudarum (2025)
External audio
- Deva - Audio Jukebox on YouTube

Singles from Deva
- 1. "Bhasad Macha" Released: 11 January 2025; 2. "Marji Cha Maalik" Released: 24 January 2025

Deva is a soundtrack album to 2025 Hindi action thriller film of the same name directed by Rosshan Andrrews, starring Shahid Kapoor and Pooja Hegde in the lead roles. The film is produced by Zee Studios and Roy Kapur Films.

The film's soundtrack and musical score were composed by Jakes Bejoy, with a song composed by Vishal Mishra. Deva marked Jakes' debut in Hindi film music. The lyrics of the songs are penned by Raj Shekhar and songs were sung by Mika Singh, Jyotica Tangri, Vishal Mishra, Shreyas Sagvekar and Baby Jean. The album preceded with two singles—"Bhasad Macha" and "Marji Cha Maalik"—before its release in its entirety in January 2025.

== Development ==
Deva marked Jakes Bejoy's debut as a music composer in Bollywood, previously having composed background score of Durgamati (2020). Vishal Mishra was hired to compose a song. The film marked Rosshan's first and third collaboration with Vishal and Jakes Bejoy. Raj Shekhar penned the lyrics of the songs. On 17 January 2025, Jakes Bejoy announced through his Twitter that Shreyas Sagvekar and Baby Jean have sung in the film.

The first single, "Bhasad Macha" was sung by Mika Singh and Jyotica Tangri. The song features Shahid Kapoor and Pooja Hegde. The song was choreographed by duo Bosco–Caesar. In early-September 2024, the song was shot in Mumbai for four days.

The second single, "Marji Cha Maalik" was a Marathi rap performed by Shreyas Sagvekar and Jakes Bejoy. Shreyas penned the lyrics of the track.

== Release ==
The music rights were bagged by Zee Music Company. The glimpse of the track "Marji Cha Maalik", which featured in film's motion poster was released on 1 January 2025, coinciding with New Year. The glimpse of the song "Bhasad Macha" was featured in the film's teaser announcement, released on 4 January.

The first single "Bhasad Macha" was released on 11 January. The full audio of the track "Marji Cha Maalik" was released on 24 January 2025, after the huge public demand.

== Track listing ==
Track listing
No.	Title	Lyrics	Music	Singer(s)	Length
1.	"Bhasad Macha"	Raj Shekhar	Vishal Mishra	Mika Singh, Vishal Mishra, Jyotica Tangri	3:21
2.	"Marji Cha Maalik"	Sheryas Sagvekar	Jakes Bejoy	Shreyas Sagvekar	2:48
3.	"Bas Tera Pyaar Hai"	Raj Shekhar	Vishal Mishra	Vishal Mishra, Pratiksha Kale	3:27
4.	"Chal Chal Patak Doon Maar"	Siddhant Kaushal	Jakes Bejoy	Baby Jean	1:08
Total length:					10:44

== Reception ==
The music received positive reception from critics.
