= Salute (2022 Indian film) =

2022 Indian film by Roshan Andrrews

- Official release poster
- Directed by: Rosshan Andrrews
- Written by: Bobby-Sanjay
- Produced by: Dulquer Salmaan
- Starring: Dulquer Salmaan; Manoj K. Jayan; Diana Penty; Lakshmi Gopalaswamy; Saniya Iyappan
- Cinematography: Aslam K. Purayil
- Edited by: A. Sreekar Prasad
- Music by: Jakes Bejoy
- Production company: Wayfarer Films
- Distributed by: SonyLIV
- Release date: 17 March 2022
- Running time: 143 minutes
- Country: India
- Language: Malayalam

Salute is a 2022 Indian Malayalam-language crime thriller film directed by Rosshan Andrrews, written by Bobby-Sanjay, and produced by Dulquer Salmaan under his banner Wayfarer Films. The film stars Dulquer Salmaan, Manoj K. Jayan, Diana Penty (in her Malayalam debut), Lakshmi Gopalaswamy, and Saniya Iyappan. The cinematography and editing was handled by Aslam K. Purayil and A. Sreekar Prasad respectively. The background score was composed by Jakes Bejoy.

Initially scheduled for a theatrical release, it was indefinitely postponed due to the rise of COVID-19 cases in India. The film eventually premiered on SonyLIV on 17 March 2022 to positive reviews from critics.

== Plot ==
SI Aravind Karunakaran, along with his colleagues and superior, DYSP Ajith, who is also his brother, arrest a man named Murali, whom they believe to be a murderer that they were searching for, forging false evidence against him. However, much to their shock, they discover that the real murderer was someone else. While Ajith and the others remain silent about their misconduct, risking their jobs, Aravind quits after refusing to be a part of the charade and to avoid getting condemned by his colleagues.

A few years later, when Aravind returns to his hometown along with his girlfriend Dia for his niece's wedding, he discovers certain leads that could lead him to the actual culprit, thereby saving Murali. Aravind then rejoins the force and begins to conduct the investigation in his own time, narrowing on a potential serial killer and identity thief who has been behind several murders around Kerala over the years using fake identities, while his brother and accomplices continue to sabotage his plans by transferring him to the Kasaragod Branch only to find out that Aravind was getting closer to finding the culprit. However, by the time Aravind tracks down his house, he discovers that the culprit was killed in a car accident while using another fake identity and his face is deformed. He nonetheless uses this in order to free Murali. Aravind is later suspended alongside Ajith, Pramod and Alex.

Aravind reads the culprit's letter, which acknowledges Aravind's findings, but after reading the date of the stamp, he realizes that the letter was written the day before the culprit died.

== Cast ==
- Dulquer Salmaan as SI Aravind Karunakaran
- Manoj K. Jayan as DYSP Ajith Karunakaran, Aravind's brother
- Diana Penty as Dia, Aravind's girlfriend
- Lakshmi Gopalaswamy as Dr Radhika Nambiar, Ajith's wife
- Saniya Iyappan as Malavika Karunakaran
- Saikumar as Anthony Thomas
- Indrans as Babu
- Binu Pappu as ASI Pramod Peter
- Alencier Ley Lopez as ASI Maraar
- Boban Alummoodan as Mahesh
- Shaheen Siddique as SI Mahesh R.
- Sudheer Karamana as Chandran Pillai
- Anandaraj as CI Prithviraj
- Ramu as IG Sam Eapen Koshy IPS
- Abhiram Radhakrishnan as ASI Rajith
- Aruldoss as Prabhu
- Vinod Sagar as Murali T. S.
- Rajesh Sharma as Thampi
- Shaji Chen as Minister Namboothiri
- Mime Gopi as Selvam
- Irshad as Royce
- Ganapathi S. Poduval as Thampi's son
- Maala Parvathi as Women's Commission Staff
- Nitin Thomas as Naveen
- Monisha Arshak as Jhansi

== Production ==
=== Development ===
In May 2020, on the seventh anniversary of Mumbai Police, director Rosshan Andrrews announced that he would be working with Dulquer Salmaan on a thriller. The film's story and screenplay would be written by his regular collaborators Bobby and Sanjay, in their sixth film together. The film's first poster was unveiled in March 2021.

=== Filming ===
Principal photography began on 3 February 2021 in Kollam. Diana Penty joined the sets on 9 February 2021 in her debut Malayalam film. Manoj K. Jayan joined shooting on 12 February 2021. The film was shot in Thiruvananthapuram, Kollam, Kasaragod, and New Delhi.

== Release ==
Salute released on SonyLiv on 17 March 2022 as a Direct-to-OTT release. The film was originally planned to release in April 2021, but was postponed multiple times due to waves of the COVID-19 pandemic in India. The premiere was rescheduled multiple times before it was finally released on the platform on 17 March 2022.

=== Legal issues ===
On 15 March 2022, ahead of the film's release, the Film Exhibitors United Organisation of Kerala (FEUOK), banned Dulquer Salmaan's films from releasing in theatres anymore since the lead actor, producer, makers had violated the rules and given the film out for a direct OTT release even though they had confirmed that it would have a theatrical release first. They also banned Wayfarer Films and Dulquer Salmaan projects. They said the ban would be permanent and refused to co-operate with Dulquer. Later the ban was withdrawn by them.

== Reception ==
In a review for Firstpost, Anna M. M. Vetticad rated the film 3 out of 5 stars and wrote, “For the most part, Salute remains engaging (...) Somewhere in the second half though, the narrative begins to stretch itself, mistaking length for ruminativeness and needless additional seconds for detail.” The Times of India gave 3.5/5 and wrote, " A cop drama with a difference." Rediff.com gave 3.5/5 and wrote, "Salute explores narratives of police brutality and unethical practices, power-hungry politicians who will stop at nothing and the helplessness of innocent victims of crime, observes Divya Nair". The News Minute gave 3.5/5 and wrote, "Dulquer's thriller is an engaging police procedural". Filmibeat gave 3/5 and wrote, "Salute is a realistic, unconventional, and intriguing cop drama that dares to take a different route. This Dulquer Salmaan starrer is definitely worth a watch". The Quint gave 3/5 and wrote, "Dulquer Salmaan's Gripping Thriller Deserves a Salute, Almost". Pinkvilla gave 3/5 and wrote, "A cold, detached character study in the guise of a crime procedural". "Janani K of India Today gave the film a rating of 3/5 and wrote "Dulquer Salmaan's riveting cop drama is replete with new ideas". Shilpa Nair Anand of The Hindu commented "Dulquer Salmaan scores with his restrained performance as a cop". Mirchi9 gave 2.5/5 and wrote, " Dulquer's thriller is an engaging police procedural". Indian Express Reviewed "Dulquer Salmaan shines in absorbing investigative drama".
