= Crazy Star (film) =

- Directed by: V. Ravichandran
- Story by: Bobby Sanjay
- Based on: Traffic (Malayalam)(2011)
- Produced by: M Govinda; R Manoranjan; N S Raj Kumar
- Starring: V. Ravichandran; Prakash Rai; Priyanka Upendra; Akul Balaji
- Cinematography: G. S. V. Seetharam
- Edited by: V. Ravichandran
- Music by: V. Ravichandran
- Production company: Eshwari Dreams
- Release date: 14 February 2014
- Running time: 139 minutes
- Country: India
- Language: Kannada

Crazy Star (Kannada: ಕ್ರೇಜಿ ಸ್ಟಾರ್) is a 2014 Indian Kannada language romantic thriller film directed, edited and composed by V. Ravichandran and produced by his home studio Eshwari Dreams. Besides himself in the lead, the other ensemble cast includes Priyanka Upendra, Prakash Rai, Bhavana Rao, Raghu Ram, Naveen Krishna, Akul Balaji, Neethu, and Ravishankar Gowda in the pivotal roles. The film is a remake of the 2011 Malayalam action-thriller movie Traffic, which has its narrative in a hyperlink format. The film opened on Valentine's Day in 2014. The film received negative reviews at the box office.

== Cast ==
- V. Ravichandran as Ravi
- Priyanka Upendra as Ravi's wife
- Bhavana Rao
- Vikram Ravichandran
- Prakash Rai
- Raghu Ram
- Akul Balaji
- Dileep Raj
- Naveen Krishna
- Avinash
- Rangayana Raghu
- Ravishankar Gowda
- Neethu
- Mimicry Dayanand
- Dingri Nagaraj
- Suryan as Yuva
- Ramesh Aravind ... guest appearance

== Soundtrack ==
The music is composed by V. Ravichandran. Lyrics are written by himself and Hamsalekha.

Track listing
No.	Title	Singer(s)	Length
1.	"Koncha Koncha Konku"	Anuradha Bhat, Badri Prasad
2.	"Baaro Baa Prekshaka"	Karthik
3.	"Yuva Hey Yuva"	Santhosh Venki
4.	"Mannisu Nanna"	Badri Prasad
5.	"Ye Ekangiye"	Rohith, Santhosh Venki, Sriram, Chaitra, Goutham
6.	"Kenakalu Inukalu"	Rajesh Krishnan, Anuradha Bhat
