= Deva (2025 film) =

2025 Indian film by Rosshan Andrrews

- Theatrical release poster
- Directed by: Rosshan Andrrews
- Screenplay by: Bobby–Sanjay; Abbas Dalal; Hussain Dalal; Arshad Syed; Sumit Arora
- Dialogues by: Hussain Dalal; Abbas Dalal
- Story by: Bobby-Sanjay
- Based on: Mumbai Police by Rosshan Andrrews
- Produced by: Siddharth Roy Kapur; Umesh KR Bansal
- Starring: Shahid Kapoor; Pooja Hegde; Pavail Gulati
- Cinematography: Amit Roy
- Edited by: A. Sreekar Prasad
- Music by: Score: Jakes Bejoy; Songs: Vishal Mishra; Jakes Bejoy
- Production company: Zee Studios; Roy Kapur Films
- Distributed by: Zee Studios
- Release date: 31 January 2025
- Running time: 156 minutes
- Country: India
- Language: Hindi
- Budget: ₹50 crore
- Box office: ₹51.73 crore

Deva is a 2025 Indian Hindi-language action thriller film directed by Rosshan Andrrews, and produced by Siddharth Roy Kapur under Roy Kapur Films and Umesh KR Bansal under Zee Studios. The film stars Shahid Kapoor, Pooja Hegde and Pavail Gulati. It is remade from Andrrews's own 2013 Malayalam film Mumbai Police. The film follows a violent cop who undergoes a personality change after losing his memory in an accident and has to reinvestigate the murder of a fellow police officer.

The film was officially announced in May 2023. Principal photography began in October 2023 in Mumbai and wrapped by September 2024. The film's score was composed by Jakes Bejoy who also composed two songs, while two other songs were composed by Vishal Mishra. The cinematography and editing were handled by Amit Roy and A. Sreekar Prasad, respectively.

Deva was theatrically released on 31 January 2025, to mixed reviews from critics with praise towards lead cast performances, the cinematography and editing, but criticism towards the screenplay and climax.

== Plot ==
ACP Dev Ambre of the Mumbai Police, is involved in an accident that leaves him with partial memory loss. Leading up to the accident, he was on a call with his brother-in-law, DCP Farhan Khan. He informed Farhan that he has solved the murder case of their friend, ACP Rohan D'Silva, who was killed during a gallantry awards ceremony at the police parade ground. However, before disclosing the murderer's name, the accident occurred, resulting in his memory loss.

Following his recuperation, Farhan tells Dev about his past, particularly his explosive behavior. He was a complex person with deep-seated emotional issues, particularly in connection to his father, also a police officer, who was killed in the line of duty, resulting in him growing up, showing resentment towards the world, and the tragedy that befell their friend Rohan. Despite his tough exterior, he is vulnerable and sensitive but deeply emotional and empathetic, with a strong sense of justice. Considering Dev's impressive-yet-volatile capabilities as a police officer, Farhan reassigns him to the case despite his condition.

As Dev recollects his past investigation, he notices inconsistencies between his new findings and the direction his old self had taken. He re-examines evidence, revisits witness statements, and reconstructs the crime scene, although certain details do not add up. During the procedure, he also discovers that he was working undercover for gangster-turned-politician, Prabhat Jadhav and even killed a notorious gangster. Rohan was shocked and hurt by his betrayal, and was unable to process his emotions. He confronted him, who confessed to the crime. In spite of his initial anger and hurt, Rohan decided to forgive him. He planned to reveal the truth about the gangster's death and his involvement, though in a way that would clear his name and give him a chance to redeem himself.

However, he misunderstood Rohan's intentions and assumed that he was going to expose him. In a fit of rage and fear, he killed Rohan. Having uncovered the motive behind Rohan's murder, Dev deduces that he himself was the killer. His past self had premeditated the murder, installing a remote-controlled automatic rifle on a rooftop overlooking the stage and shooting his friend with a tap on his phone during the gallantry awards ceremony. Upon confessing everything to Farhan, it is revealed that he was already aware Dev was the culprit, as he had confessed moments before the accident. Nonetheless, Farhan needed to know the reason why Dev killed him, and so Dev surrenders himself to the police.

Six months later, Dev is in prison cell and probably has his memory back as we see him in a fit of rage again when trouble occurs.

== Cast ==
- Shahid Kapoor as ACP Dev Ambre
- Pooja Hegde as Diya Sathaye, a journalist
- Pavail Gulati as ACP Rohan D'Silva, Dev's childhood friend
- Pravesh Rana as DCP Farhan Khan, Dev's brother-in-law
- Kubbra Sait as SI Dipti Singh
- Girish Kulkarni as Minister Jairaj Apte
- Manish Wadhwa as Prabhat Jadhav
- Gaurav More as Nagesh
- Upendra Limaye as Sharpshooter
- Abhilash Chaudhary as Jigar
- Pravin Patil as JCP Abhay Rana
- Saadhika Syal as Shweta
- Meenal Sahu as Rebecca, Rohan's girlfriend
- Aditi Sandhya Sharma as Bhawna (credited as Aditi Sharma)
- Shivraj Walvekar as Rohan's father (voice dubbed by Samay Raj Thakkar)
- Chandan K Anand as Mandar Soorti

== Production ==
=== Development ===
In early-August 2022, it was reported that Rosshan Andrrews visited Shahid Kapoor at his residence and narrated a script which impressed him. Later, in November 2022, Rosshan Andrrews through his social media handles, confirmed that he would direct Shahid Kapoor in his upcoming film. Touted to be an action thriller, the film marks the first collaboration between Rosshan and Kapoor, and the first Hindi venture of Rosshan.

The film is produced by Siddharth Roy Kapur's Roy Kapur Films and Zee Studios and co-produced by Malvika Khatri. The production houses made a public announcement on 25 May 2023, confirming the project. The film's official title Deva was revealed on 24 October 2023, on the occasion of Dussehra, though it was previously reported to be named Koi Shaq. Siddharth Roy Kapur had gained permission from Subhash Ghai, who reserved the title for a Amitabh Bachchan–starrer film.

Shariq Patel of Zee Studios revealed that they had been in separate discussions with Siddharth and Shahid over the years about different projects. Somehow they didn't materialise and it took this film to come together and this is the first time that the Zee Studios have collaborated with both director and actor.

=== Pre-production ===
Pre-production started on 16 November 2022. It took several months for the writing and pre-production. The film is scripted by the duo Bobby–Sanjay, in their ninth collaboration with Rosshan. Sumit Arora, Hussain Dalal and Arshad Syed wrote the Hindi dialogues for the film. Later, Rosshan began location scouting for the film and shared a few pictures through his Instagram page. Kapoor stated the film is an "edgy action thriller with lots of action and thrill".

Vishal Mishra would compose the songs, and background score by Jakes Bejoy. Technicians include cinematographer Amit Roy, editor A. Sreekar Prasad, production designer Sandeep Ravade, and costume designers Niharika Jolly, Malavika Kashikar and Chandani Mehta. Supreme Sundar, Abbas Ali Moghul, Anl Arasu, Parvez Shaikh, Vikram Dahiya were also hired as stunt directors. Prior to the start of film production, Kapoor attended a special workshop in October 2023, in order to train physically and intensively for his role in the film.

=== Casting ===
Mukesh Chhabra was the casting director. Shahid Kapoor plays the role of a police officer in the film, and sported a short hairstyle for his character, similar to his look in Haider (2014) since 10 years. He said he is playing "a very hard character" in the film. In May 2023, Pooja Hegde was reported to be the lead actress, and her inclusion was confirmed by makers on 13 October 2023, on Hegde's birthday. The makers wanted "a fresh casting" and finalised Hegde, marking her maiden collaboration with both Rosshan and Kapoor. Hegde portrays Diya, a journalist.

Kubbra Sait joined the cast in early-November 2023, and would play a police officer role. The film marks her second collaboration with Kapoor, after web series Farzi. For her character, she underwent training for three months during the project's pre-production process, and also went through a workshop in Mumbai. In late-November, Pavail Gulati joined the cast, marking his first action film. Gulati felt his role "demands physical and mental dedication". For that he attended a special workshop in January 2024, in order to train physically and intensively for his role in the film. For some challenging scenes involving hand-to-hand combat scenes featuring Gulati, Rosshan initially considered hiring a body double, but said he felt the body double's work was inauthentic and did it himself.

=== Filming ===
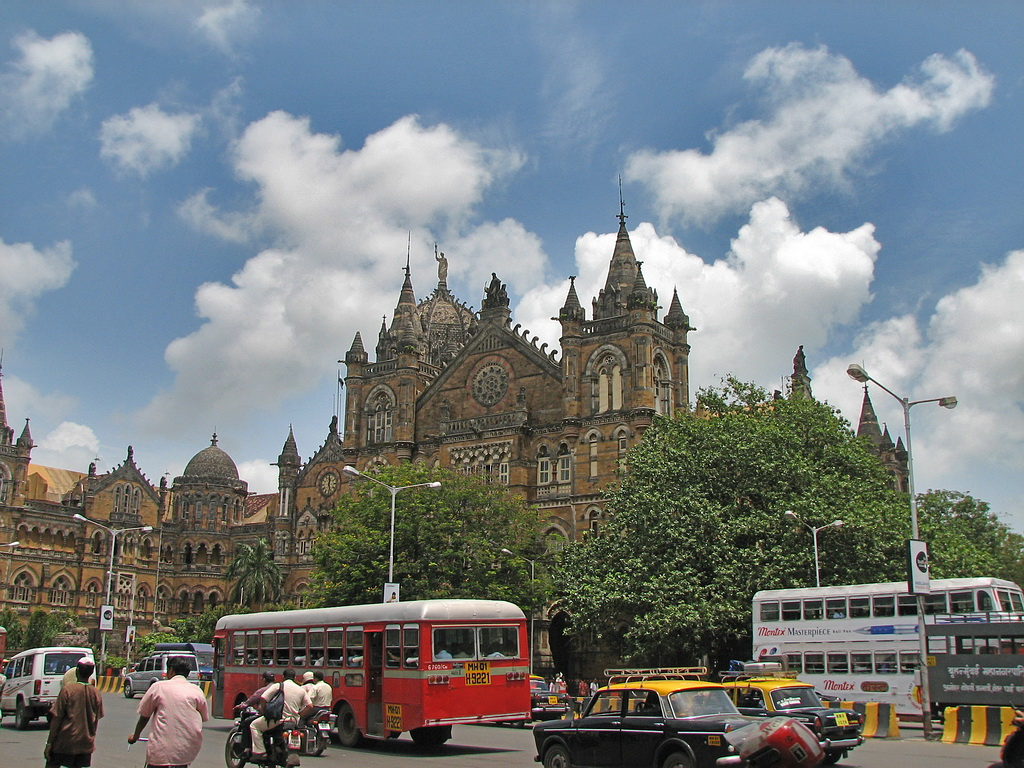
South Mumbai, where most parts of the film were shot

It was reported that the whole film would be shot in Mumbai, mostly in real places, with only a few small scenes shot on a set. Principal photography commenced with a muhurat shot on 12 October 2023 with the film's cast and crew. Shahid Kapoor and Pooja Hegde joined in this schedule, in Mumbai. Later in November, Kubbra Sait and Pavail Gulati joined this schedule. The schedule was extensively shot at Dongri Charnul, Mumbai. The first schedule was wrapped in Mumbai on 21 December 2023. In late-February stills were revealed by the official social media handles for the film under the tagline #OnTheSetsOfDeva.

The second schedule of the film was begun in March 2024 in Mumbai, with Gulati joining the schedule. Hegde joined the schedule on 14 March 2024. On the next day, Kapoor joined the schedule on 15 March. Kapoor shot some action and chasing scenes in this schedule in Mumbai. Gulati was trained with the stunt directors before filming a hand-to-hand combat sequence in Mumbai in late March 2024. Action scenes featuring Kapoor was shot in April 2024, at Dongri, Mumbai. The next schedule began on 19 June, with an action sequence choreographed by Supreme Sundar being shot at Mumbai. Hegde joined the final schedule early-July after completing first schedule of Retro. Filming wrapped on 8 July 2024 except a song sequence. A footage of Kapoor, while filming a song was leaked and went viral. In early-September 2024, a song titled "Bhasad Macha", featuring Kapoor and Hegde, choreographed by the duo Bosco–Caesar was shot in Mumbai for four days. Entire principal photography wrapped on 4 September with a wrap-up party held in Mumbai. It was revealed that 3 different climax scenes were filmed to keep the suspense around the ending of the film.

=== Post-production ===
After filming was completed in July 2024, the film entered into an extensive post-production phase. The VFX of the film were provided by Firefly Creative Studio, Identical Brains Studios, Old Monk Studio and The VFX Company. Ken Metzker of Red Chillies Color did the colouring for the film. Subash Sahoo served as the sound designer. Although the technical crew worked on three climax sequences, only one climax scene made it into the final cut.

On 30 December 2024, the film received a U/A certificate from the Censor Board, with a finalised runtime of 156.53 minutes.

== Soundtrack ==
Deva

Soundtrack album by Vishal Mishra and Jakes Bejoy
- Released: 12 February 2025
- Recorded: 2024
- Genre: Feature film soundtrack
- Length: 10:43
- Language: Hindi
- Label: Zee Music Company
External audio
- Deva - Audio Jukebox on YouTube

The film score and two songs were composed by Jakes Bejoy in his third collaboration with Rosshan. This is his second film in Hindi, previously having composed background score of Durgamati (2020). Vishal Mishra also composed two songs, in his first collaboration with Rosshan. The lyrics are written by Raj Shekhar. The music rights were bought by Zee Music Company. The teaser of track "Marji Cha Maalik" which featured in film's motion poster was released on 1 January 2025.

The first single "Bhasad Macha" was released on 11 January 2025. The full audio of the track "Marji Cha Maalik" was released on 24 January 2025, after the huge public demand.

Track listing
No.	Title	Lyrics	Music	Singer(s)	Length
1.	"Bhasad Macha"	Raj Shekhar	Vishal Mishra	Mika Singh, Vishal Mishra, Jyotica Tangri	3:21
2.	"Marji Cha Maalik"	Shreyas Sagvekar	Jakes Bejoy	Shreyas Sagvekar	2:48
3.	"Bas Tera Pyaar Hai"	Raj Shekhar	Vishal Mishra	Vishal Mishra, Pratiksha Kale	3:27
4.	"Chal Chal Patak Doon Maar"	Siddhant Kaushal	Jakes Bejoy	Baby Jean	1:07
Total length:					10:43

== Marketing ==
The film's motion poster was released on 1 January 2025, coinciding with the New Year. The film's teaser was released on 5 January 2025 at an event in Carter Road Amphitheatre, Bandra. On 11 January 2025, Kapoor and Hegde were in Dubai where they performed "Bhasad Macha" and for promotional activities of the film at the opening ceremony of the 2025 International League T20. The trailer for the film was released on 18 January 2025 at an event in Mumbai.

According to Pinkvilla, promotional activities were delayed because of health issues. The promotional campaign kickstarted with an event held at Mithibai College, Mumbai on 23 January. The next day an event was held at R. D. National College, Bandra. On 28 January, Kapoor and Hegde toured Delhi for the film's promotion. A fan event was held at Sharda University. The same day, an event was held at the Connaught Place, New Delhi where the cast interacted with the media and fans.

== Release ==
=== Theatrical ===
Deva was theatrically released on 31 January 2025. It was earlier planned to release on 11 October 2024, coincidn with Dussehra, but was postponed to 14 February 2025, coinciding with Valentine's Day. The release date was later preponed by two weeks.

=== Home media ===
The digital streaming rights were acquired by Netflix. The film began streaming on the platform from 28 March 2025.

== Reception ==
=== Critical response ===
On the review aggregator website Rotten Tomatoes, 46% of 13 critics' reviews are positive, with an average rating of 5.3/10.

Firstpost's Vinamra Mathur termed Deva a "forgettable remake" of Andrrews's Malayalam film Mumbai Police (2013). She praised Kapoor's performance, but bemoaned that the film had changed the original's climax by altering the lead character's homosexuality. Shubhra Gupta of The Indian Express was not pleased with turning Mumbai Police's story into a hero-centred narrative. Justin Rao of The Hollywood Reporter India also opined that "Mumbai Police is reduced to a hero-worshipping vehicle of cliches and boredom in a painful downgrade of a solid idea". Writing for India Today, Zinia Bandyopadhyay believed that changing the original's climax "took away [the film's] biggest shock value". Conversely, NDTV's Saibal Chatterjee was more appreciative of the remake (which he considered significantly different from the original) for "liberally and judiciously sprinkling a mix of masala ingredients on a good cop-bad cop whodunnit".

Sukanya Verma of Rediff.com opined, "Shahid's heft is the only thing that keeps up the momentum in a mediocre rehash, dumbed down by flimsy motive and mindless bravado". Nandini Ramnath of Scroll.in was appreciative of the film's technical aspects, particularly its cinematography and editing, as well as Kapoor's performance, but was critical of "its treatment of weighty themes such as guilt, culpability and redemption". Hindustan Times' Rishabh Suri bemoaned that despite compelling work from Kapoor, the film was let down by a "predictable story" and "convoluted twists".

=== Box-office ===
The film concluded its run with worldwide gross estimated to be ₹51.73 crore.
