= Udayananu Tharam =

- Promotional poster
- Directed by: Rosshan Andrrews
- Screenplay by: Sreenivasan
- Story by: Sreenivasan; Rosshan Andrrews
- Produced by: C. Karunakaran
- Starring: Mohanlal; Meena; Sreenivasan; Mukesh; Jagathy Sreekumar
- Cinematography: S. Kumar
- Edited by: Ranjan Abraham
- Music by: Songs: Deepak Dev; Score: Ouseppachan
- Production company: Perfect Group
- Distributed by: Carlton Films
- Release date: 21 January 2005 (Kerala)
- Running time: 162 minutes
- Country: India
- Language: Malayalam
- Budget: ₹2.35–2.75 crore (Note: Sify reported ₹2.35 crore, Malayala Manorama reported ₹2.75 crore.)
- Box office: est. ₹6.69 crore

Udayananu Tharam (transl. Udayan is the star) is a 2005 Indian Malayalam-language black comedy satire film directed by Rosshan Andrrews (in his directorial debut) and written by Sreenivasan based on a story they had co-written. The film stars Mohanlal, Sreenivasan, Meena, Mukesh, Jagathy Sreekumar and Salim Kumar. The songs featured in the film was composed by Deepak Dev, while Ouseppachan provided the background score. Udayananu Tharam presents the Malayalam film industry through a satirical viewpoint.

The financial and artistic crisis which plagued the once glittering Malayalam film industry at the turn of the 21st century lies at the center of the story. It depicts the struggles of Udayabhanu (Mohanlal), an assistant director who aspires to be a director. But he is thwarted in his attempts by a scheming friend and junior artist, Rajappan Thengamoodu (Sreenivasan), who steals his screenplay to become superstar Saroj Kumar.

The film made the biggest ever opening until then in the history of Malayalam cinema. The film won two Kerala State Film Awards, for Best Debut Director and for Best Choreography. It is inspired by the 1999 movie Bowfinger. It was remade into Tamil cinema as Velli Thirai in 2008 and into Bollywood as Shortkut in 2009.

== Plot ==
Udayabhanu alias Udayan is a hardcore worshipper of films and a talented assistant director, who learns to write and direct his own film at a time when the industry is filled with dubious filmmakers. Rajappan Thengummoodu is a rather crooked friend of Udayan and an aspiring and failed actor.

Udayan finally prepares to shoot his first film based on his own script, he discovers to his horror that Rajappan has stolen his manuscript, and filming is underway with Rajappan playing the leading role, which eventually propels him to stardom. Udayan soon finds himself faced with a career and personal crisis, with his faltering relations with his actress wife Madhumathi contributing to the latter. She leaves the house later after Udayan causes chaos in the house after getting drunk, saying that he lost everything.

Later, with the help of producer Babykuttan, Udayan prepares to direct another film, but he is forced to cast Rajappan as the hero since he was the star with most market value at that time. Rajappan takes up the offer, since he is also at a plateau of his career, but refuses to co-operate and throws tantrums and causes maximum trouble when possible. He spends most of his time actively flirting with the actresses in the film. Towards the end of the shoot, using a perceived insult as a ruse, Rajappan leaves the set leaving the film half way with the hope that this will destroy Udayabanu's career for ever. But Udayan devises clever tactics and shoots the remaining scenes with Rajappan without him even being aware of it.

At the end, the film is a critical and box office success, which also saves Rajappan from his damaging career, Rajappan realises his mistakes, admits publicly that Udayan is the real star and not himself and apologises to Udayan.

== Cast ==
- Mohanlal as Udayabhanu (Udayan)
- Sreenivasan as Rajappan Thengummoodu (Superstar Saroj Kumar)
- Mukesh as Babykuttan
- Meena as Madhumathi, Udayan's wife
- Bhavana as Gayathri
- Jagathy Sreekumar as Pachalam Bhasi
- Salim Kumar as Rafeeq
- A. K. Lohithadas as Director Prathapan
- Janardhanan as Krishnamoorthy, Madhumathi's father
- Cochin Haneefa as Producer "Sona" Sisupalan
- Indrans as Vijayan Varkala
- Anand as Dinesh, Madhumathi's brother
- T. P. Madhavan as Bhaskaran
- Deepika Mohan as Bhaskaran's wife
- Sreehari as Valsan Kondotty
- Baiju Ezhupunna as Benz Mathew
- Deepa Rahul Eswar as News Anchor

== Production ==
The film was the directorial debut of Rosshan Andrrews who started as an assistant director in Malayalam cinema. He changed his name from Roshan Andrews to Rosshan Andrrews as per numerology before the film's release. The film's story was conceived by Andrrews, who prepared the story three years back but producers were not willing to take the film as they thought a film based on film industry would not work. He also approached Jayaram for the film, but he also rejected it as he was a new director. He then narrated the story to Sreenivasan who developed it into a screenplay, which took two years, and introduced him to C. Karunakaran who agreed to produce the film. Sreenivasan also helped him to cast Mohanlal in the lead role.

== Soundtrack ==
All lyrics are written by Kaithapram Damodaran; all music is composed by Deepak Dev.

No.	Title	Artist(s)	Length
1.	"Parayaathe"	K. J. Yesudas, K. S. Chithra
2.	"Karale Karalinte"	Vineeth Sreenivasan, Rimi Tomy
3.	"Penne En Penne"	Afsal, Pop Shalini
4.	"Parayaathe"	Karthik
5.	"Penne En Penne" (My Girl - Remix)	Afsal
6.	"Udayananu Tharam"	Ranjith Govind, Deepak Dev

== Home media ==
The satellite rights for Udayananu Tharam was sold to Asianet for a hitherto record sum of ₹36 lakhs. AP International released the film on DVD and Blu-ray Disc.

== Reception ==
=== Critical response ===
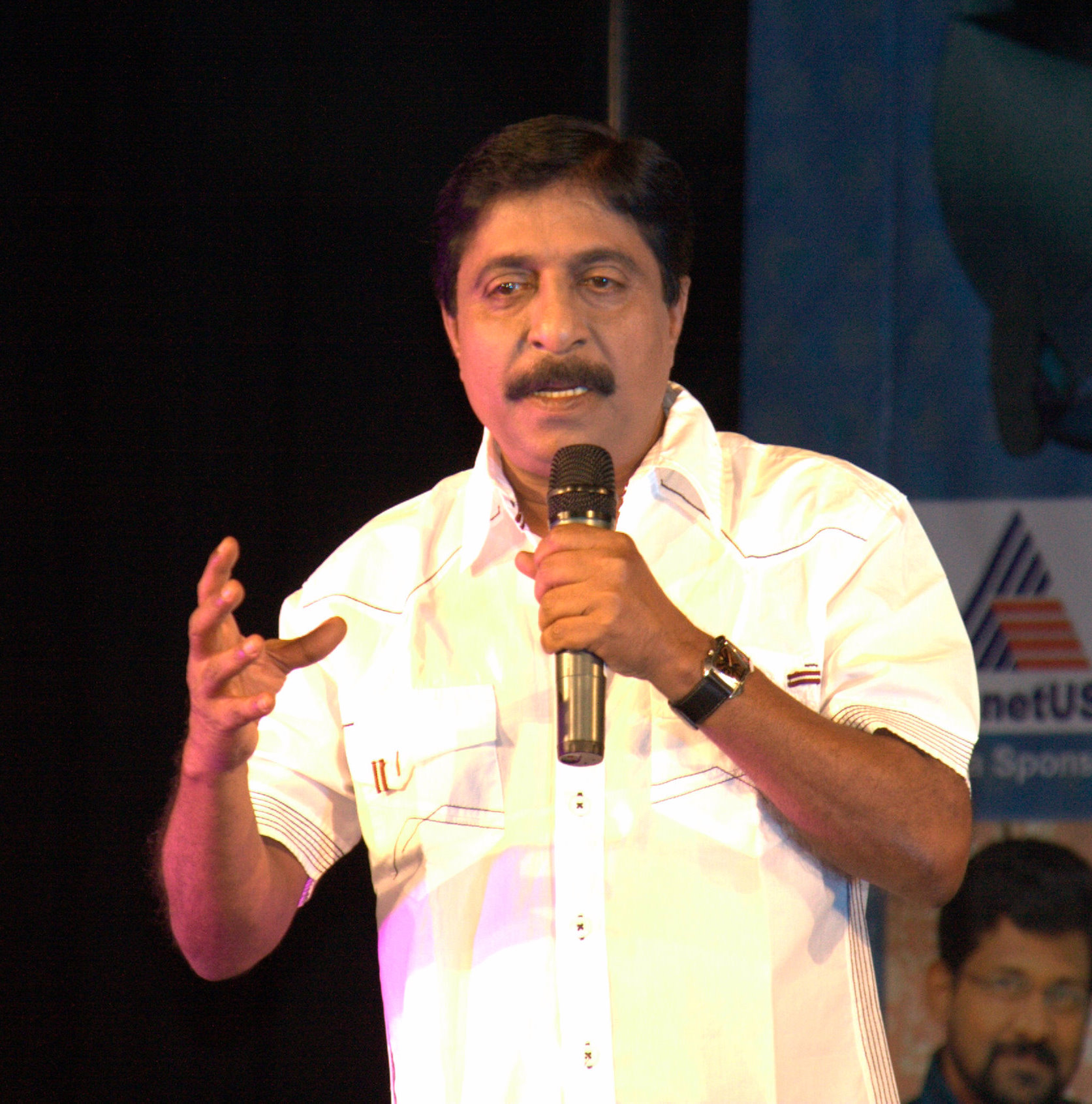
Sreenivasan received critical acclaim for his performance as Saroj Kumar and his refreshing script.

Writing for The Hindu, Sreedhar Pillai wrote, "Udayananu Tharam, directed by debutant Rosshan Andrrews, asserts that the creator is a path-breaking director. After many years of prattle about `new' cinema within the commercial format, Udayananu Tharam gives some substance to the contention that Malayalam cinema has come of age. The most refreshing thing is that it is a genre film, a black comedy, rather than omnibus masala concoctions serving all the nine rasas. Paresh C. Palicha of Now Running gave the film 3 stars out of 5 and wrote, ""Sreenivasan has peppered the story with real life incidents. He does not spare the two reigning superstars of Malayalam cinema, Mammootty and Mohanlal, even though the latter is the film's hero." He also praised Sreenivasan's performance writing, "Mohanlal gives a restrained and dependable performance as Udayan. But it is Sreenivasan who steals the thunder with his over-the-top act as the megalomaniac superstar." Sify, in their review gave the film a verdict of "Excellent" and praised the film for its refreshing script, writing, "Writer Sreenivasan and director Rosshan traces Udayan's dreams and progresses in a realistic manner. The wry passages and the swipes at the superstars are gingerly executed."

The reviewer for Webindia called the film "a definite entertainer" and praised the film's script, writing, "Sreenivasan writes about real life incidents that happen in the film industry and presents them in a humorous manner. He makes a dig at everyone, not even leaving the superstars. The director has handled the script well. But somewhere something is amiss in the narrative especially in the first half." They also praise Sreenivasan's performance writing, "It is Sreenivasan who steals the show as the dimwit obnoxious superstar Saroj Kumar." Varnachithram, praising Mohanlal's performance wrote, "He performs his role with great subtlety and makes us feel the pain of the character." They conclude writing, "Even with all the drawbacks we mentioned, it was a good movie to watch with the minimum standard we expect from Malayalam movies. But it is not a classic along the lines of Nadodikaatu (1987) or Sanmasullavarku Samadhanam (1986) which we like to watch over and over again. Finally, the movie should have been called Sreeniyanu Tharam (Sreeni is the star) for he was the real star of this movie.

=== Box office ===
It was made on a budget of ₹2.35 crore, including prints and publicity. The film was a major commercial success and a blockbuster. It was the first hit of the year. It took the biggest ever opening for a Malayalam film until then, surpassing Narasimham (2000). It grossed about ₹3.12 crore to ₹3.40 crore in two weeks from 41 screens in Kerala, with a distributor share of ₹1.38 crore (US$150,000). The film grossed ₹19,80,000 in 17 days at Ernakulam Shenoys theatre, which was a record. The film then grossed Rs 6.69 Crore from 41 screens in 35 days and a distributor's share of ₹2.76 Crore. The film managed to recover its budget from the releasing stations. It ran for 100 days in several cities such as Kochi, Thiruvananthapuram, Kozhikode and Thrissur. The film also performed well in cities outside Kerala, like Bengaluru, Chennai and Mumbai. In Mumbai it has taken a share of over ₹5 lakh from the Fame Adlabs multiplex.

== Accolades ==
Award	Category	Nominee(s)	Result
Kerala State Film Awards	Best Debut Director	Rosshan Andrrews	Won
Kerala State Film Awards	Best Choreographer	Brinda	Won
Asianet Film Awards	Best Actor	Mohanlal	Won
Asianet Film Awards	Best Script Writer	Sreenivasan	Won
Asianet Film Awards	Best Cinematographer	S. Kumar	Won

== Spin-off ==
A spin-off titled Padmasree Bharat Dr. Saroj Kumar directed by Sajin Raaghavan was released in 2012. Sreenivasan reprises the role of Saroj Kumar from the original. The director announced that this is not a sequel. Only some characters from Udayananu Tharam were used.
