= School Bus (film) =

- Theatrical poster
- Directed by: Rosshan Andrrews
- Screenplay by: Bobby–Sanjay
- Produced by: A. V. Anoop
- Starring: Kunchacko Boban; Jayasurya; Aparna Gopinath
- Cinematography: C. K. Muraleedharan
- Edited by: Vivek Harshan
- Music by: Gopi Sunder
- Production company: A. V. A. Productions
- Distributed by: Central Pictures Release
- Release date: 27 May 2016
- Country: India
- Language: Malayalam

School Bus is a 2016 Indian Malayalam-language thriller film directed by Rosshan Andrrews. The film stars Kunchacko Boban, Jayasurya, and Aparna Gopinath in the lead roles. The screenplay is written by Bobby–Sanjay.

== Plot ==
Joseph and Aparna with their two children, symbolise a modern nuclear family. Joseph's son, Ajoy, often gets into a lot of trouble at school and his father Joseph, a mild-tempered business man scolds him. The working and quarreling parents, having no time to spare with the kids, lead the children to hide things away from them for the fear of getting scolded. The children, at first, take into solving problems by themselves but later it goes out of their hands. Ajoy takes a flight to escape the wrath of everyone and finally, lands in the middle of a deep forest. The story later revolves around the quest for Ajoy whereby his parents realise their mistakes and unite to find him. The two children are the film's main characters and are based on a real-life incident. Sub Inspector R. Gopakumar is a police officer who comes to enquire about the missing Ajoy. The film portrays the weak bonds in the modern nuclear families and also the attitude of the school authorities which put the students under pressure against even minute mistakes.

== Cast ==
- Kunchacko Boban as CI Gopakumar
- Jayasurya as Joseph
- Aparna Gopinath as Aparna Joseph
- Aakash Muraleedharan as Ajoy Joseph (voiced by Gourav Menon)
- Angelleena Rosshan as Angelina Joseph
- Ann Benjamin as Nimmy
- Baiju Ezhupunna as Jabbar
- Jeni Susan as Teacher
- Manju Sunichan as Annie
- Baiju VK as Navaneeth's father
- Nandhu as ASI Mohan
- Albert Alex as Constable Salim
- Abhija Sivakala as Servant
- Minon as Kannan
- Vijayakumar as SI Babu
- Rizwan M Shiras as Class Leader

== Production ==
C. K. Muraleedharan of 3 Idiots (2009) and PK (2015) was signed as the cinematographer. In fact, Muraleedharan's son and Rosshan's daughter are acting as Jayasurya's children in the movie. Apart from Jayasurya and Aparna, Kunchacko Boban too plays a key role in the movie. The filming started on 10 February 2016 and finished in late April 2016. Actor Jayasurya did the role for free and did not ask for remuneration because he felt the film had a great message.

== Critical response ==
The Times Of India rated the film 3 out of 5 stars saying that "With barely two-hours of runtime, School Bus is a movie that can be enjoyed by both kids and adults alike and has also a social message that accompanies every Bobby–Sanjay duo's film". sify gave the film 3 out of 5 and stated "School Bus has its fine moments and though the story goes along predictable lines, it can connect with the family audience. It could have been better, but even in the current form, it's a fine watch". filmibeat gave it 3 out of 5 and wrote " School Bus is a decent, classy family thriller, recommended for the family audiences". Behindwoods said that "The movie is a good watch for children and also will leave deep thoughts in parents".
