= Nirnayakam =

2015 film by V. K. Prakash

Nirnaayakam
- Theatrical Release Poster
- Directed by: V. K. Prakash
- Written by: Bobby–Sanjay
- Produced by: Jose Simon; Rajesh George; Sonu Singh (Executive)
- Starring: Asif Ali; Prem Prakash; Nedumudi Venu; Malavika Mohanan; Tisca Chopra; Sanusha
- Cinematography: Shehnad Jalal
- Edited by: Mahesh Narayanan
- Music by: Songs: M. Jayachandran; Background Score: Ouseppachan
- Distributed by: Jairaj Films
- Release date: 5 June 2015
- Running time: 112 minutes
- Country: India
- Language: Malayalam

Nirnaayakam is a 2015 Indian Malayalam-language drama film written by Bobby–Sanjay and directed by V. K. Prakash. The film features Asif Ali and Prem Prakash in the lead roles and Nedumudi Venu, Malavika Mohanan, Tisca Chopra and Sanusha in supporting roles. It was produced jointly by Jose Simon and Rajesh George under the banner Jairaj Films. The film was released on 5 June 2015. It is remade into Hindi as Kaagaz 2 (2024).

== Plot ==
Ajay is a student at National Defence Academy, Pune. Once he visited Kochi upon request from his ailing father Siddharth, a leading advocate. There, he gradually gets involved with a case. Ajay starts taking steps to help his father win the case involving the death of a woman named Arya, alleged to have taken place due to a government party's negligence. The film highlights the need for the government to change its attitude concerning human rights.

== Cast ==
- Asif Ali as Ajay Shankar
  - Gourav Menon as Young Ajay
- Prem Prakash as Adv. Siddharth Shankar
- Nedumudi Venu as Venukuttan Nair
- Malavika Mohanan as Saral
- Tisca Chopra as Sreeprada Shankar
- Sanusha as Arya
- Saiju Kurup as Ravi Shankar
- Ashokan as Adv. Shafeer
- Sudheer Karamana as Your Lordship
- Adil Ibrahim as Sudev
- Shankar Ramakrishnan as Dr. Prakash Mathew
- Rony David as City Police Commissioner Arun George Varghese IPS
- Riza Bava as KT Chandrasekhar
- Prakash Bare as Mohan
- Hemanth Menon as Anand Chandrasekhar
- Muthumani as Dr. Hema
- Lena as Government Pleader
- Devi Ajith as District Collector
- Dinesh Panicker as Chief Secretary
- Swaminathan as Kunchankumar
- Sreedevi Unni as Venukuttan's wife
- Rajesh Hebbar as Dr.George
- Mukundan as Senior Civil Police officer K Unnikrishan, Traffic Police Officer

== Production ==
The movie is produced by Jairaj Motion Pictures, with Josemon Simon.

The movie is distributed by Renji Panicker Entertainment.

== Release and reception ==
The film started production in December 2014 and released on 6 June 2015 in 58 screens across Kerala.

A critic from The Times of India rated the film three-and-a-half out of five stars and wrote that "The film is a mouthpiece to all those who have been silently suffering this issue for ages; definitely worth a watch".

== Awards ==
- National Film Awards

Best Film on Other Social Issues

- Kerala State Film Awards

Best Character Actor – Prem Prakash

- Kerala Film Critics Association Awards

Best Actor (Special Jury) - Asif Ali
