= 36 Vayadhinile =

2015 Indian film by Rosshan Andrrews

- Theatrical release poster
- Directed by: Rosshan Andrrews
- Written by: Viji (dialogues)
- Screenplay by: Bobby–Sanjay
- Story by: Rosshan Andrrews
- Produced by: Suriya
- Starring: Jyothika; Rahman
- Cinematography: R. Diwakaran
- Edited by: Mahesh Narayanan
- Music by: Santhosh Narayanan
- Production company: 2D Entertainment
- Distributed by: Studio Green
- Release date: 15 May 2015
- Running time: 115 minutes
- Country: India
- Language: Tamil
- Budget: ₹5 crore

36 Vayadhinile (transl. At the age of 36) is a 2015 Indian Tamil-language comedy drama film directed by Rosshan Andrrews. It is a remake of his Malayalam film How Old Are You (2014), and produced by Suriya under his production studio 2D Entertainment, marking his debut as a producer. The film stars Jyothika marking her comeback to films after an eight-year hiatus, while Rahman, Nassar, Ilavarasu, Siddhartha Basu and Abhirami appear in other prominent roles. The soundtrack was composed by Santhosh Narayanan, with cinematography and editing handled by R. Diwakaran and Mahesh Narayanan respectively.

36 Vayadhinile was released on 15 May 2015. The film received positive reviews from critics, mainly for Jyothika's performance and became a commercial success. She won the Filmfare Critics Award for Best Actress – Tamil and the Tamil Nadu State Film Award for Best Actress for the year 2015. The film won seven awards at the 2015 Tamil Nadu State Film Awards including Best Actress.

== Plot ==
36-year-old Vasanthi is a UD clerk in the Revenue Department; her husband Tamil Selvan works at All India Radio. Tamil Selvan aspires to emigrate to Ireland, but Vasanthi cannot accompany him as most Irish companies refuse her job applications because of her age. She leads a mundane life, but she craves a change.

One day, Vasanthi is summoned by IG Rajan to his office and she learns that the President of India would like to have a conversation with her. The meeting ends in disaster after she faints in front of the President and becomes the subject of Facebook memes. Before long, she watches helplessly as her husband and daughter Mithila fly away to Ireland.

Vasanthi's old classmate Susan David, now a successful CMO, reminds her of the bold, strong-willed woman she used to be and inspires her to rediscover her younger self, a woman with big dreams and aspirations. Vasanthi, who is encouraged to have bigger goals in her life, gets an idea through a wedding catering order. She learns about the unhealthy market vegetables that are sprayed with toxic pesticides, and refines her home greenhouse while appealing to other women in her neighbourhood to start their own greenhouses for the welfare of their families.

Susan gets Vasanthi a slot in the region's annual architectural conference, which is graced by the bigwigs of the country, and her talk on organic greenhouse farming concepts is well received by the audience. Despite resistance and a lack of support from her husband, Vasanthi persists with her new project, which turns out to be a big success as she was able to fulfill the demand of the wedding catering order and materialise her idea. She receives regional and national acclaim for her endeavours. Following this success, Vasanthi once again gets an invitation from the President. This time, Vasanthi is unwavering and answers the questions. She finally gets the respect and appreciation of her husband and daughter.

== Cast ==
- Jyothika as Vasanthi Tamil Selvan (Note: Her name is misspelled as "Vasanthi Tamil Selvam" in the song "Pogiren".)
- Rahman as Tamil Selvan
- Nassar as Commissioner V. Rajan
- Ilavarasu as Vegetable Merchant
- Siddhartha Basu as the President of India
- Abhirami as Susan David
- Amritha Anil as Mithila Tamil Selvan
- Sethu Lakshmi as Thulasi
- Delhi Ganesh as Vasanthi's father-in-law
- Jayaprakash as the textile shop owner
- M. S. Bhaskar as Stephen
- Bose Venkat as K. Satish Kumar
- Prem as Jayachandran
- Kalaranjini as Vasanthi's mother-in-law
- Devadarshini as Girija Sreenivasan
- Sujatha Sivakumar as Raani
- Mohan Raman as Nalabagam Sellur Pichai
- Rajasekar as a retired teacher and neighbour
- Muthukaalai as a roadside advisor
- Vazhakku En Muthuraman as Vasanthi's superior
- Mippu as Kumar
- Meera Krishnan as a teacher
- Scissor Manohar as an auto driver
- Venkatesh as a Revenue Department worker
- Cheranraj as a police officer
- Bayilvan Ranganathan as Bayilvan Ranganathan

== Production ==
In August 2014, it was announced that actress Jyothika would make a comeback to acting after a seven-year sabbatical by featuring in the Tamil remake of Rosshan Andrrews's Malayalam film How Old Are You (2014). Jyothika's husband Suriya agreed to produce the venture under his production banner 2D Entertainment, while director and writer Rosshan Andrrews and Bobby–Sanjay were retained from the original version. Suriya revealed that Jyothika and he were impressed by the Malayalam version and Jyothika took two days to agree to make a return as an actress. Actor Rahman was added to the cast in October 2014, to play the role originally played by Kunchacko Boban. Santhosh Narayanan was signed on to compose the film's score and soundtrack.

Filming began in November 2014 and shoots were planned to take place in Chennai, Delhi and Rajasthan. The final scene of the film was first shot, with scenes of Jyothika's character meeting the President of India, played by Siddhartha Basu, at Rashtrapati Bhavan filmed in New Delhi. During the first schedule, actress Abhirami also signed on to portray a pivotal role, marking a comeback to Tamil films after an eleven-year absence.

== Music ==
The soundtrack and background score for 36 Vayadhinile was composed by Santhosh Narayanan. The soundtrack album features eleven tracks, which includes three songs, five instrumentals from the original score and three karaoke numbers. The lyrics for the three songs were written by Vivek. The film's audio was launched on 6 April 2015, at The Leela Palace Hotel in Chennai.

== Marketing and release ==
The film's first look poster was released on 8 March 2015, coinciding with International Women's Day. The trailer of the film was released at the audio launch, which was held on 6 April 2015. The film was released on 15 May 2015. It was dubbed in Telugu as 36 Vayasulo and released in 2020 on Aha.

== Reception ==
=== Critical response ===
The film received positive reviews from critics. Sify wrote "Overall, 36 Vayadhinile is a better film than the[sic] most of the so called commercial movies and it is must watch for the family audiences who seek quality entertainment. There are some positive messages that the film conveys, which also need to be appreciated". M. Suganth of The Times of India rated 3 1/2 of out 5 stars and wrote "36 Vayadhinile might be a familiar tale of women empowerment, but the issues that it deals with [..] are very valid". S. Saraswathi of Rediff.com gave the film 3 stars and wrote "A simple yet effective script, well executed by the director, coupled with some enjoyable music, and the wonderful performance of Jyothika definitely make 36 Vayadhinile worth a watch". However, Baradwaj Rangan gave a negative review in The Hindu, stating, "36 Vayadhinile is not cinema. It's, at best, a glorified television soap, broadly written and staged and performed, and blaring its messages through a megaphone".

=== Box office ===
The film, made on a budget of ₹5 crore (equivalent to ₹8.2 crore or US$860,000 in 2026), grossed around ₹15 crore (equivalent to ₹25 crore or US$2.6 million in 2026) within two weeks and was considered highly successful by trade analyst Sreedhar Pillai, given its low-budget.

== Accolades ==
Award (Note: Awards, festivals and organisations are in alphabetical order.)	Date of ceremony (Note: Date is linked to the article about the awards held that year, wherever possible.)	Category	Recipient(s) and nominee(s)	Result	Ref.
Filmfare Awards South	18 June 2016	Best Actress (Critics) – Tamil	Jyothika	Won	
Filmfare Awards South	18 June 2016	Best Actress – Tamil	Jyothika	Nominated	
Filmfare Awards South	18 June 2016	Best Film – Tamil	36 Vayadhinile – 2D Entertainment	Nominated	
Filmfare Awards South	18 June 2016	Best Director – Tamil	Rosshan Andrrews	Nominated	
Filmfare Awards South	18 June 2016	Best Supporting Actress – Tamil	Devadarshini	Nominated	
Filmfare Awards South	18 June 2016	Best Lyricist – Tamil	Vivek – ("Rasathi")	Nominated	
IIFA Utsavam	24–25 January 2016	Best Actress – Tamil	Jyothika	Nominated	
IIFA Utsavam	24–25 January 2016	Best Lyricist – Tamil	Vivek – ("Rasathi")	Nominated	
IIFA Utsavam	24–25 January 2016	Best Male Playback Singer – Tamil	Lalitha Vijayakumar – ("Rasathi")	Nominated	
Mirchi Music Awards South	8 April 2015	Album of the Year – Tamil	36 Vayadhinile	Nominated	
Mirchi Music Awards South	8 April 2015	Song of the Year – Tamil	"Rasathi"	Nominated	
Mirchi Music Awards South	8 April 2015	Music Composer of the Year – Tamil	Santhosh Narayanan – ("Pogiren")	Nominated	
Mirchi Music Awards South	8 April 2015	Lyricist of the Year – Tamil	Vivek – ("Pogiren")	Nominated	
Mirchi Music Awards South	8 April 2015	Female Vocalist of the Year – Tamil	Lalitha Vijayakumar – ("Rasathi")	Nominated	
Mirchi Music Awards South	8 April 2015	Female Vocalist of the Year – Tamil	Kalpana Raghavendar – ("Pogiren")	Nominated	
Mirchi Music Awards South	8 April 2015	Upcoming Lyricist of the Year – Tamil	Vivek – ("Pogiren")	Won	
Mirchi Music Awards South	8 April 2015	Upcoming Female Vocalist of the Year – Tamil	Lalitha Vijayakumar – ("Rasathi")	Nominated	
Norway Tamil Film Festival Awards	28 April–1 May 2016	Best Female Playback Singer	Lalitha Vijayakumar – ("Rasathi")	Won	
South Indian International Movie Awards	30 June–1 July 2016	Best Actress – Tamil	Jyothika	Nominated	
Tamil Nadu State Film Awards	6 March 2024	Best Film Portraying Woman in Good Light	36 Vayadhinile – 2D Entertainment	Won	
Tamil Nadu State Film Awards	6 March 2024	Best Actress	Jyothika	Won	
Tamil Nadu State Film Awards	6 March 2024	Best Comedian	Devadarshini	Won	
Tamil Nadu State Film Awards	6 March 2024	Best Lyricist	Vivek – ("Rasathi")	Won	
Tamil Nadu State Film Awards	6 March 2024	Best Make-up Artist	Sabari Girishan	Won	
Tamil Nadu State Film Awards	6 March 2024	Best Male Dubbing Artist	Gautham Kumar	Won	
Tamil Nadu State Film Awards	6 March 2024	Best Female Playback Singer	Kalpana Raghavendar – ("Pogiren")	Won	
