= How Old Are You (film) =

- Theatrical release poster
- Directed by: Rosshan Andrrews
- Written by: Bobby Sanjay
- Produced by: Listin Stephen
- Starring: Kunchacko Boban; Manju Warrier
- Cinematography: R. Diwakaran
- Edited by: Mahesh Narayanan
- Music by: Gopi Sunder
- Production company: Magic Frames
- Distributed by: Central Pictures & Tricolor Entertainment
- Release date: 17 May 2014 (Kerala)
- Running time: 141 minutes
- Country: India
- Language: Malayalam

How Old Are You is a 2014 Indian Malayalam-language comedy drama film directed by Rosshan Andrrews, written by Bobby Sanjay and produced by Listin Stephen. It stars Manju Warrier, Kunchacko Boban, Kaniha, Lalu Alex and Amritha Anil. This film marks the return of Manju Warrier after a 15-year sabbatical break from the industry. The film was released on 17 May 2014. It received positive reviews from critics and was a major commercial success of the year at the box office. The movie was remade in Tamil as 36 Vayadhinile with Jyothika.

== Plot ==
The story is centered on 36-year-old Nirupama, who works as a clerk in the Revenue Department. Her husband is Rajeev Narayanan who works at Akashavaani and aspires to migrate to Ireland. Nirupama can't accompany him as most Irish companies turn down her job applications. There is nothing interesting about her life; she leads a normal life but craves change.

One fine day, she gets an invitation from the President and gets summoned to the IG's office and learns that the President of India would like to have a conversation with her, after a question which her daughter posed to the President who came to the school. Unfortunately, Nirupama faints in-front of the President and the meeting turns out to be a disaster. Post this, she becomes the laughing stock on Facebook. Nirupama is then faced with the issue of being criticized by her family members. Later Nirupama gets in a situation where she has to watch her husband and daughter fly to Ireland.

Susan David, her old classmate, a successful businesswoman, reminds her of the woman she used to be and inspires her to rediscover her younger self. Nirupama then explains her situation, when she met the president, to the social media and clears her name. Her inability to rise up to her daughter's expectations and the discomfiture of her husband being mistaken for her younger brother further troubles her. Nirupama had a habit of having a vegetable garden on her roof, without the usage of chemicals or pesticides.

One day Nirupama visits an old woman whom she would meet every day on her bus. Both of them don't even know their names, and when she gets to know that the woman is sick, Nirupama turns up at her house with her own vegetable. The old woman thanks her for the time she spent for her and for reminding her that she is not alone in this world. News of her pure vegetables spreads as the sick woman shares them with her employer.

The same employer turns out to be a well-off businessman and is impressed by the quality of the vegetables. He asks Nirupama if she could provide vegetables for his daughter's wedding in four months. For this Nirupama encourages all her neighbors to cultivate vegetables on their rooftops as well, which turns out to be a huge success. In between, Nirupama's daughter calls her to Ireland, but she hesitates as she has much work remaining, including finishing the commitment to supply vegetables for the wedding. Her husband is not happy with this hesitation and implies strongly that she needs to drop everything to come and help her daughter in Ireland. He says that she is neglecting her duties and her daughter. Nirupama reminds her husband to expect only what is given to her.

Her friend Susan David encourages her to present at a seminar with important people as an audience, including a State Minister and Collector. Her topic of biofarming by prioritizing organic vegetable gardens in the design of all housing projects influenced all the officials who appoint her as the lead visionary in making this a reality in Kerala. Once again the President meets her and her family; this time to discuss the vision of expanding Nirupama's biofarming idea nationwide.

The meeting turned out to be a successful one. Nirupama is finally able to answer the question that her daughter asked the president. "Who decides the expiry date of a woman's dreams?" The transformation of her character from a depressed woman to a steady and sprightly lady is complete and the movie ends.

== Cast ==
- Manju Warrier as Nirupama Rajeev
- Kunchacko Boban as Rajeev Narayanan
- Kaniha as Susan David, Nirupama's friend (extended cameo appearance)
- Muthumani as Sashikala
- Amritha Anil as Lekshmi Rajeev, Nirupama and Rajeev's daughter
- Vinay Forrt as Jayachandran
- Siddhartha Basu as President of India
- Lalu Alex as I. G. Karthikeyan IPS
- Kunchan as Narayanan, Rajeev's father
- Kalaranjini as Rajeev's mother
- Sethu Lakshmi as Madhaviyamma
- Vanitha Krishnachandran as Nirupama's mother
- Thesni Khan as Rani
- Idavela Babu as Bhaskaran, Superintendent
- Prem Prakash as Simon sir
- Devan as Setharaman Iyer
- Suraj Venjaramoodu as Benny
- Sudheer Karamana as D. I. G. Stephen Varghese IPS
- Vaishak Uthaman as the official IT Staff, Kochi Police
- Jayakrishnan as Mohan Varma, District Collector
- Shankar Ramakrishnan as Minister Jayakumar
- Jayaraj Warrier as Sivankutty
- Jayesh Pazhanimala
- Vaigha Rose as Suhra

== Soundtrack ==
How Old Are You

Soundtrack album by Gopi Sundar
- Released: 10 May 2014
- Recorded: 2013
- Studio: Sound Factory
- Genre: Film soundtrack
- Length: 7:20
- Language: Malayalam
- Label: Muzik 247
- Producer: Gopi Sundar

Gopi Sundar chronology
Mr. Fraud (2014)	How Old Are You (2014)	Bangalore Days (2014)

The film's soundtrack contains 3 songs, all composed by Gopi Sundar and Carnival Band. Lyrics by Hari Narayanan, Rafeeq Ahamed.

#	Title	Singer(s)
1	"Vijanathayil"	Shreya Ghoshal
2	"Vaa Vayassu Cholli"	Manjari
3	"Happy Birthday"	Carnival Band

== Reception ==
=== Critical reaction ===
Sify's reviewer rated the film as "watchable" and wrote, "Just like the 2012 Bollywood film English Vinglish that marked the return of Sridevi, director Rosshan Andrrews’s How Old Are You brings back the terrific Manju Warrier, who stayed away from the movies for 14 years." Veeyen of Nowrunning.com stated that "Roshan Andrews in his film 'How Old Are You' takes us along on a woman's quest to unearth her long buried identity. Armed with a bravura performance by Manju Warrier, this superbly acted and emotionally engaging drama is a keeper of a film, and quite an impressive one at that."

Sharika C. of The Hindu said, "A must-watch, the film is also her [Manju Warrier's] way of making a statement – that age does not matter and you are never too old to chase your dreams. Ab ki baar, Manju Warrier!" She cited the film as "one of those rare films that will bring crowds to the theatre just to watch a middle-aged female protagonist perform" and named it as one of Kunchacko Boban's best performances. Paresh C Palicha of Rediff.com rated the film 3/5 and said, "How Old Are You is a good watch not just because it is the comeback film of Manju Warrier, but also because it has got a good story to tell." Metromatinee.com called the film "Light hearted yet weighty."

=== Box office ===
How Old Are You? was a commercial success. In Kerala alone, the film earned a distributor's share of approximately ₹5 crore from 77 screens in 25 days run. The film collected US$78,897 from the United Kingdom in three weeks.

== Awards ==
2014 Kerala State Film Awards

- Won, Second Best Actress - Sethulakshmi
- Won, Best Female Singer - Shreya Ghoshal – "Vijanathayil paathivazhi"

62nd Filmfare Awards South

- Filmfare Award for Best Actress - Manju Warrier
- Filmfare Award for Best Female Playback Singer - Shreya Ghoshal
- Nominated, Best Film
- Nominated, Best Director - Rosshan Andrrews
- Nominated, Best Actor in a Supporting Role (Female) - Sethulakshmi

== Remakes ==
How Old Are You? was remade into Tamil as 36 Vayadhinile in 2015, with Jyothika, marking her comeback to films after an eight-year hiatus, while Rahman, Abhirami, Nassar, Delhi Ganesh and Siddhartha Basu appear in other prominent roles.The film released on 15 May 2015 and met with positive reviews by praising Jyothika's performances, for which she was awarded Filmfare Critics Award for Best Actress at 63rd Britannia South Filmfare Awards.
