= Take Off (2017 film) =

2017 Malayalam-language film

- Take Off Poster
- Directed by: Mahesh Narayanan
- Written by: Mahesh Narayanan; P. V. Shajikumar
- Produced by: Anto Joseph; Shebin Backer; Megha Rajesh
- Starring: Kunchacko Boban; Parvathy Thiruvothu; Fahadh Faasil
- Cinematography: Sanu John Varghese
- Edited by: Mahesh Narayanan; Abhilash Balachandran
- Music by: Songs: Gopi Sunder; Shaan Rahman; Score: Gopi Sunder
- Production company: Rajesh Pillai Films
- Distributed by: Anto Joseph Film Company
- Release date: 24 March 2017 (India)
- Running time: 139 minutes
- Country: India
- Language: Malayalam
- Box office: ₹25 crore (US$2.6 million)

Take Off is a 2017 Indian Malayalam-language survival thriller film based on the ordeal of Indian nurses in the city of Tikrit, Iraq in 2014. The film is directed by Mahesh Narayan (in his directorial debut). It stars Kunchacko Boban and Parvathy Thiruvothu Fahadh Faasil appears in an extended cameo in the film. It is written by Narayan and P. V. Shajikumar. The film was shot in Dubai and Kerala.

Take Off was released on 24 March 2017, and received acclaim from critics, winning the Silver Peacock - Special Jury Award (for Mahesh Narayan), and Silver Peacock for Best Actress (Parvathy) at the 48th IFFI. Parvathy also won her first Special Jury Mention at the 65th National Film Awards, her second Kerala State Film Award for Best Actress, and a second Filmfare Award for Best Actress - Malayalam. It was included in The Hindu's top 25 Malayalam films of the decade.

== Plot ==
Sameera is a nurse in Kerala who is moving to Iraq for better salary. Her husband, Faizal and family members were not supportive of her wish to work to pillar her family who are struggling to repay loans they have taken for her nursing education. Their differences come to a head they get divorced, leaving her son Ibrahim under Faizal's care. Shaheed, a colleague from work, understands all her problems and wishes to marry her. Though Sameera is initially hesitant about another marriage, the two get married before moving to Iraq. ‌They along with a group of 19 nurses of the same hospital move to Iraq to join Tikrit Teaching College, which is an Iraqi government hospital.

Moving to Iraq, they realize Iraq is no more a peaceful country as projected during interview time, with conflicts rising on daily basis. The doctors are over-strained with rise of casualties. Sameera's proficiency in Arabic helps her to communicate better with the Iraqi Arabic doctors and she leads the nurses' group in their new working environment and challenges. In mean time, she gets pregnant and needs to hide this from her first son, Ibrahim who is about to visit her for vacation. Surprisingly, Faizal also comes along to permanently hand over Ibrahim to Sameera due to issues in his family. Ibrahim finds it hard to accept Shaheed as his step-father and when he realizes that his mom has remarried, he runs out of their quarters only to see the city is now a major riot zone with pro-ISIS supporters uprising against Iraqi Central Government in the city. He is brought back to the quarters by Sameera. Shaheed feels that Ibrahim needs some time alone with Sameera to realize the new environment. For this, he offers his assistance to an army medical team moving to Mosul to deal with the local casualties over there. He consoles Sameera that it's a matter of two weeks which would be sufficient for Ibrahim to adjust to his new circumstances and the mission is not dangerous as the army is along with them.

However within a day, Mosul falls into the hands of ISIS and the medical team is taken into captive. News gets flashed and Sameera pleads with hospital management to help in rescuing her husband. As Iraqi forces retreat from Mosul, the Iraqi government is no longer in position to help. The hospital manager advises Sameera to seek assistance of Indian Embassy in Baghdad. Sameera along with manager visits Embassy where she meets Indian Ambassador Manoj Abraham. They promise assistance but remind them that it's a war zone and Indian Government has its own limitations in intervening.

While Sameera is in Baghdad, Tikrit falls into ISIS hands which they discover while coming back to hospital. ISIS militants kill the manager, while bringing Sameera back to hospital to join with other nurses who are now captives of ISIS. Sameera relays this matter to Indian Embassy and calls out for help, which brings the matter to serious concern of both Indian Government and Kerala Government, as all nurses were from Kerala state.

In meantime at Mosul, ISIS terrorists kill the doctor for not complying with them to treat wounded terrorists. Shaheed to save his life, offers medical assistance to wounded ISIS terrorists. Sameera starts informing about the tensed situation at Tikrit through her mobile to Kerala government. The Chief Minister of Kerala along with India's Foreign Affairs Minister starts briefing with the Ambassador. As there is no direct communication or normal diplomatic relationship with ISIS, Indian government has little chances of a formal route to intervene. Indian Government sends its Foreign Secretary to Iraq, who initially thinks that Iraqi Army will help the stranded nurses out of Tikrit. However the Ambassador doesn't join on that and assumes full responsibility to rescue. Meanwhile, International Red Cross and Red Crescent Movement offers their assistance and a bus is arranged to fetch all stranded nurses out of Tikrit. But, as they need to pass through extreme violent war zones of Mosul, Indian Embassy cancels permission, which results only Indian Nurses stranding in Tikrit, while other nationalities taken out. However the decision of Indian Embassy is proven right when the bus gets caught in a crossfire near Mosul, killing all nurses. With just 19 Indian nurses stranded in Tikrit, ISIS decides to use them as human shields and plan to take them to their key base Mosul. India responds by dropping food packets near hospital, but one packet contains a secret satellite phone with location detector which Sameera take over to correspond with Crisis Command center at Indian Embassy.

Ambassador Manoj instructs Sameera to destroy all passports and documents that reveal their identity and asked all other nurses to declare themselves as Muslims, as ISIS terrorists might attack non Muslims among them. Sameera teaches all other nurses basic religious things like Namaz and covering the head as well as hiding all religious symbols. Meantime, Kerala Government along with its Foreign affairs agency- NORKA brings in a prominent Malayalee Businessman- Jayamohan of Crescent Group who have close links with Influential Saudi royal member and persuades him to make a deal with ISIS on India's behalf. Jayamohan, after hearing the nurses pleas over their satellite phone, rushes to meet Sheikh Salman, member of royal family, requesting his assistance to intervene with the ISIS . After a prolonged discussion, He agrees to broker on behalf of India unofficially without any record.

Meanwhile, at Mosul ISIS base, Sameera and nurses are brought before a main cleric, who test them to ensure they all are Muslims. Sameera's knowledge in Arabic, her son's knowledge in Quran and the coordinated Namaaz all help them to believe that the entire nurses are of Muslims and no harm is done. With the Royal's intervention, a secret deal was drawn between India and ISIS. ISIS agrees to transfer the nurses to Erbil near the Kurdistan Check Point. Meanwhile, with Sameera's persistence, she finds out Shaheed among ISIS captives who were about to be executed and with her pleas, she is able to rescue him from there. Sameera, Shaheed, Ibrahim and nurses are brought to Kurdistan from where India take them over in their buses and a special flight is arranged to take them back to Cochin from Erbil.

As the movie ends, actual footages of nurses reaching Cochin airport and their narration of experience under ISIS are depicted on the screen with a second climax scene where Jayamohan destroys the documents that reveal the secret deal between India and ISIS, with a voice over that it shall remain as a classified secret of India.

== Cast ==
- Kunchacko Boban as Shaheed
- Parvathy Thiruvothu as Sameera
- Fahadh Faasil as Manoj Abraham IFS, Embassy of India in Baghdad (extended cameo appearance)
- Divyaprabha as Jincy, Sameera's colleague
- Prakash Belawadi as Rajan Menon,
- Sreelal Warriar Indian Minister of External Affairs
- Eric Zachariah as Ibrahim "Ibru", Sameera and Faizal's son
- Parvathi T. as Shaheed's mother
- Anjali Nair as Hasna, Shaheed's sister
- Prem Prakash as Jayamohan, Crescent Group CEO
- Rukhsar Rehman as Dr. Nafeeza
- Alencier Ley Lopez as Salim, Sameera's father
- Devi Ajith as Dr. Susan
- Sreeja Das as Daisy
- Vishnu Prakash as Subair, Sameera's Uncle
- Rebecca Santhosh as Sameera's sister
- Rony David Raj as Alby, Shaheed's friend
- Ujjwal Chopra as Yosuf
- Sal Yusuf as Dr. Thareek
- Asif Ali as Faizal, Sameera's ex-husband (cameo appearance)
- Priyadarshi Pulikonda as an Indian in Iraq
- Joju George as the husband of a nurse in interview hall (cameo appearance)
- Sidhartha Siva as Doctor
- Shaheen Siddique as Malayali Terrorist
- Additionally, several monochrome archive footages of several personalities, including Mother Teresa were shown in the prologue

== Music ==
Take Off

Soundtrack album by Gopi Sundar, Shaan Rahman
- Released: 2017
- Recorded: 2017
- Genre: Feature film soundtrack
- Length: 8:09
- Label: Gopi Sundar Music Company

The music is composed by Gopi Sundar and Shaan Rahman.

Soundtrack
No.	Title	Lyrics	Music	Singer(s)	Length
1.	"Mohabathin"	B.K.Harinarayanan	Gopi Sundar	Gopi Sundar, Divya S. Menon, Muhammad Maqbool Manzoor	02:09
2.	"Pulkodiyil Thoomani"	Rafeeq Ahamed	Shaan Rahman	Hesham Abdul Wahab	03:45
3.	"Ilavanka Poove"	B.K.Harinarayanan	Shaan Rahman	Shaan Rahman	02:15
Total length:					08:09

Take Off

Film score by Gopi Sundar
- Released: 2017
- Length: 15:19
- Label: Gopi Sundar Music Company
- Producer: Gopi Sundar

Gopi Sundar chronology
Oru Mexican Aparatha (2017)	Take Off (2017)	The Great Father (2017)
External audio
- Official Audio Jukebox on YouTube

The background score is composed by Gopi Sundar.

Score
No.	Title	Length
1.	"Love Theme 1"	0:58
2.	"Love Theme 2"	0:39
3.	"Family Theme"	1:14
4.	"Happy Theme"	0:52
5.	"Mother & Son Theme"	0:59
6.	"Mother In Law Theme"	0:44
7.	"Sameera's Emotional Cry Theme"	0:35
8.	"At Militans Place Theme"	1:20
9.	"Rescue Theme"	0:45
10.	"Plans For The Rescue Theme 1"	1:19
11.	"Plans For The Rescue Theme 2"	0:58
12.	"Plans For The Rescue Theme 3"	1:28
13.	"Plans For The Rescue Theme 4"	1:42
14.	"Plans For The Rescue Theme 5"	1:46
Total length:		15:19

== Box office ==
Take Off was released on 24 March 2017. Satyam Audios released the VCD, DVD and Blu-ray of the film in mid 2017.

The film was screened at international festivals, including International Film Festival of India and International Film Festival of Kerala.

The film grossed ₹25 crore at the box office. The film collected $853,101 from UAE box office in its three weekends,$21,248 from UK box office and $9,918 from New Zealand box office. The film ran for over 125 days in theatres

== Reception ==
The Times Of India rated the film 4 out of 5 stars saying that "Take Off is a brilliant take on a real-life tale and with the director's own spin on the incidents, it makes an engaging cinematic experience that could give even Bollywood movies of similar genre, made at much-bigger budgets, a run for their money". The News Minute rated the film 3 out of 5 stars and stated "With excellent performances and intelligent direction, Take Off is a must-watch". Manorama Online rated the film 3.5 out of 5 stars saying that "Take Off is an absolute must-watch if you want to witness Mollywood's earnest attempt to fly new heights.

Baradwaj Rangan of Film Companion South wrote "The film, thus, lands in a Roja-meets-Airlift zone. These portions are still very well done. The director isn't after your average rescue thriller. He wants to explore this chapter of recent history, and even through the fictionalising techniques, we sense documentary-like precision in the way information has been gathered and is now being disbursed to us...the production values are outstanding...the filmmaking is so precise, I jumped out of my skin."

== Difference between film and actual events ==
The film was inspired by the real events which happened in 2014, during the early days of the ISIS crisis in Iraq. At the same time, it's a work of fiction. The incidents close to the reality starts just about the close to the interval. The incidents depicted there after is very graphic in nature and also match with how the story unfolded in the real life.

- The story in the second half tells us how a group of nurses who were working at a hospital in Tikrit, an Iraqi town near Mosul, Iraq were rescued from the captivity of terrorist group Islamic State of Iraq and Syria, which is a real incident. However, in movie the group consists of 19 nurses, while in reality the group had 46 members.
- Parvathy's character Sameera is loosely based on Marina Jose who played an instrumental role in the rescue operation. Marina was in touch with Oommen Chandy, then Chief minister of the Indian state of Kerala and A. Ajaya Kumar, the Indian Ambassador to the Republic of Iraq. Her SOS messages helped the Indian officials in keeping track with the nurses.
- Another decision that perhaps made the crucial difference was stopping the nurses from travelling with a Red Cross rescue operation. This incident was later confirmed by the Chief minister of Kerala.
- In the movie, at the peak of the tension, the group was seen as being relocated by the militants to Mosul. This match with the real incident.
- The movie shows a reluctant Keralite business man was persuaded by the Indian Ambassador into using his close ties with the Saudi Royal Family to get them talk to the militants. While this was speculated by media during the days after the successful rescue of the nurses, India's external affairs minister Sushma Swaraj refuted this in the Parliament of India. However former Chief Minister Oommen Chandy has later confirmed that, "Malayali NRI businessmen in the Middle East have helped significantly in the release of Malayali nurses from the war-hit regions of Iraq and Libya. The situation as you know was critical and some of our businessmen extended help." But he didn't give any details of the nature of the help by the Keralite business community, citing security to the personnel involved.

== Controversy ==
In an event on April 20, 2020 Parvathy said that Islamophobia is a reality in Kerala and her films including Take Off are also part of that. To this allegation, director Mahesh Narayanan responded that Parvathy doesn't know what Islamophobia is.

== Awards and nominations ==
List of accolades received by Take Off
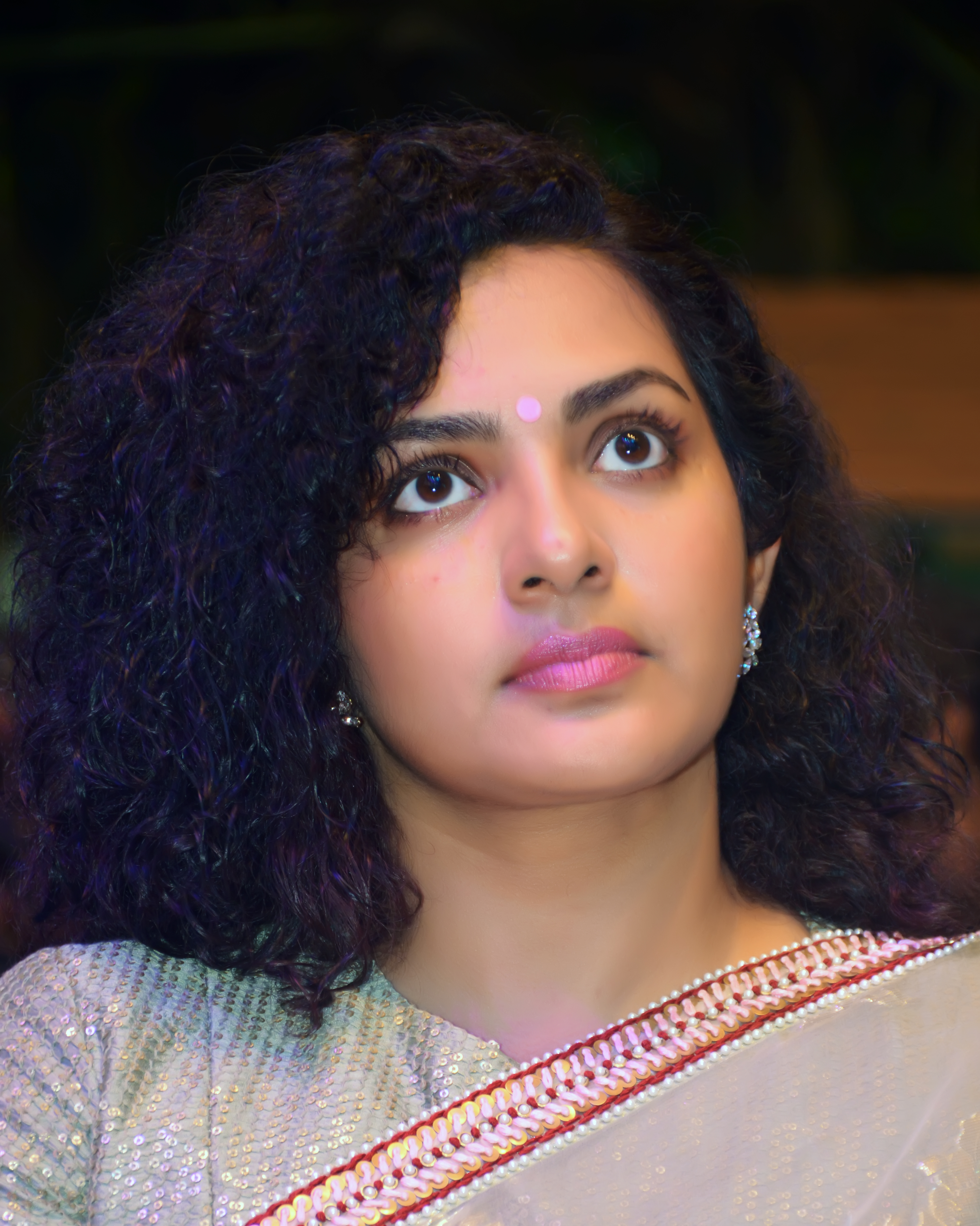
- Parvathy's performance in Take Off garnered her several awards and nominations
Accolades
Award	Won	Nominated
Asianet Film Awards	4	4
Asiavision Awards	3	3
CPC Cine Awards	1	1
Filmfare Awards South	1	4
International Film Festival of India	2	2
Kerala State Film Awards	5	5
National Film Awards	2	2
North American Film Awards	2	2
South Indian International Movie Awards	2	5
Vanitha Film Awards	3	3
- Total number of awards and nominations (Note: Awards in certain categories do not have prior nominations and only winners are announced by the jury. For simplification and to avoid errors, each award in this list has been presumed to have had a prior nomination.)
Totals	25	31
- References

Award	Date of ceremony (Note: Date is linked to the article about the awards held that year, wherever possible.)	Category	Recipient(s)	Result	Ref.
Asianet Film Awards	20 May 2018	Most Popular Film	Take Off	Won	
Asianet Film Awards	20 May 2018	Best Director	Mahesh Narayanan	Won	
Asianet Film Awards	20 May 2018	Best Actress	Parvathy Thiruvothu	Won	
Asianet Film Awards	20 May 2018	Critics Choice Best Actor	Kunchacko Boban	Won	
Asiavision Awards	24 November 2017	Socially Committed movie	Take Off	Won	
Asiavision Awards	24 November 2017	Best Director	Mahesh Narayanan	Won	
Asiavision Awards	24 November 2017	Best Music Director	Gopi Sundar	Won	
CPC Cine Awards	18 February 2018	Best Actress	Parvathy Thiruvothu	Won	
Filmfare Awards South	16 June 2018	Best Film – Malayalam	Take Off	Nominated	
Filmfare Awards South	16 June 2018	Best Director – Malayalam	Mahesh Narayanan	Nominated	
Filmfare Awards South	16 June 2018	Best Actress – Malayalam	Parvathy Thiruvothu	Won	
Filmfare Awards South	16 June 2018	Best Supporting Actor – Malayalam	Kunchacko Boban	Nominated	
International Film Festival of India	20–28 November 2017	Special Jury Award	Mahesh Narayanan	Won	
International Film Festival of India	20–28 November 2017	Best Actress	Parvathy Thiruvothu	Won	
Kerala State Film Awards	8 March 2018	Best Debut Director	Mahesh Narayanan	Won	
Kerala State Film Awards	8 March 2018	Best Art Director	Santhosh Raman	Won	
Kerala State Film Awards	8 March 2018	Best Actress	Parvathy Thiruvothu	Won	
Kerala State Film Awards	8 March 2018	Best Background Music	Gopi Sundar	Won	
Kerala State Film Awards	8 March 2018	Best Makeup Artist	Ranjith Ambady	Won	
National Film Awards	3 May 2018	Special Mention Award	Parvathy Thiruvothu	Won	
National Film Awards	3 May 2018	Best Production Design	Santhosh Raman	Won	
North American Film Awards	7 May 2018	Critics Choice Best Actress	Parvathy Thiruvothu	Won	
North American Film Awards	7 May 2018	Janapriya Thaaram Award	Kunchacko Boban	Won	
South Indian International Movie Awards	14–15 September 2018	Best Film – Malayalam	Take Off	Nominated	
South Indian International Movie Awards	14–15 September 2018	Best Director – Malayalam	Mahesh Narayanan	Nominated	
South Indian International Movie Awards	14–15 September 2018	Best Debut Director – Malayalam	Mahesh Narayanan	Won	
South Indian International Movie Awards	14–15 September 2018	Best Actress – Malayalam	Parvathy Thiruvothu	Won	
South Indian International Movie Awards	14–15 September 2018	Best Supporting Actor – Malayalam	Kunchacko Boban	Nominated	
Vanitha Film Awards	25 February 2018	Best Film	Take Off	Won	
Vanitha Film Awards	25 February 2018	Best Actress	Parvathy Thiruvothu	Won	
Vanitha Film Awards	25 February 2018	Best Family Hero	Kunchacko Boban	Won	
