= Kerala State Film Award for Best Debut Director =

Annual Indian film award

The Kerala State Film Award for Best Debut Director is presented annually at the Kerala State Film Awards of India.

The following have won the award over the years:

Year	Director	Film
1986	Raghunath Paleri	Onnu Muthal Poojyam Vare
1988	Ali Akbar	Maamalakalkkappurath
1989	Suresh Unnithan	Jaathakam
1990	Ajayan	Perumthachan
1991	Haridas	Georgootty C/O Georgootty
1992	George Kithu	Aadhaaram
1993	P. T. Kunju Muhammed	Magrib
1994	M. A. Venu	Chakoram
1995	Rajakrishnan	Sraadham
1996	Sundar Das	Sallapam
1998	Venu	Daya
1999	V. K. Prakash	Punaradhivasam
2000	Subrahmanian Santakumar	Mankolangal
2001	Priyanandanan	Neythukaran
2002	Sathish Menon	Bhavam
2003	Nemom Pushparaj	Gourishankaram
2005	Rosshan Andrrews	Udayananu Tharam
2006	Avira Rebecca	Thakara Chenda
2007	Babu Thiruvalla	Thaniye
2008	Madhupal	Thalappavu
2009	P. Sukumar	Swantham Lekhakan
2010	Mohan Raghavan	T. D. Dasan Std. VI B
2011	Sherrey	Adimadhyantham
2012	Farook Abdul Rahiman	Kaliyachan
2013	K. R. Manoj	Kanyaka Talkies
2014	Abrid Shine	1983
2015	Sreebala K Menon	Love 24x7
2016	Shanavas K Bavakutty	Kismath
2017	Mahesh Narayan	Take Off
2018	Zakariya Mohammed	Sudani from Nigeria
2019	Ratheesh Balakrishnan Poduval	Android Kunjappan Version 5.25
2020	Muhammad Musthafa	Kappela
2021	Krishnendu Kalesh	Prappeda - Hawk's Muffin
2022	Shahi Kabir	Ela Veezha Poonchira
2023	Fazil Razak	Thadavu
2024	Fasil Muhammed	Feminichi Fathima
