= Alli Thandha Vaanam =

2001 film directed by Viji

- Poster
- Directed by: Sreedhar Prasadh (Viji)
- Written by: Sreedhar Prasadh
- Produced by: Kaja Mydeen; K. Ayisha
- Starring: Prabhu Deva; Laila; Neha Bajpai
- Cinematography: Ravi Yadav
- Edited by: Anil Malnad
- Music by: Vidyasagar
- Production company: Roja Combines
- Release date: 14 September 2001
- Running time: 140 minutes
- Country: India
- Language: Tamil

Alli Thandha Vaanam (transl. The sky gave me too much) is a 2001 Indian Tamil-language romance film directed by Viji (Sreedhar Prasadh). The film stars Prabhu Deva, Laila and Neha Bajpai, with Prakash Raj, Vivek, Moulee, and Rajeev playing supporting roles. Murali appeared in a guest role. The film was released on 14 September 2001.

== Plot ==
Sathyam is the carefree son of a rich businessman, owner of Sathyam Mills Lakshmipathi. He has been in New York for his college studies and returns to Coimbatore after years. Prakash, Sathyam's cousin, has continuously spoiled Satyam by secretly sending him money to spend away in the US, as Prakash wants to inherit Sathyam Mills. Disappointed by Sathyam's bohemian behaviour, Lakshmipathi asks Satyam to spend three months alone on the streets of Chennai to learn the value of money. He would have no money and could not use the information of who he is or his education (paid by his father), to gain favour or make a living from anyone.

So Sathyam sets out and from the very start, meets Divya, who plays an overexuberant 21 year girl, who cries or laughs constantly. In the next frame, he saves Meenakshi in the style of M. G. Ramachandran from would-be rapists, and in the third, he meets Julie, they both take each other as siblings. Sathyam promises Julie that he will help find her mother. Together they set out on a journey in search of her mum and to make a living (to survive to meet the daily need; food, shelter and medicine). Julie has her own sad story. He sees Meenakshi again, and the two of them fall in love.

Julie and Sathyam steal a suitcase from Madhavan, but later that night find out it is full of medicine. Without his medicine, Madhavan falls unconscious. Satyam goes to return the medicine and finds him unconscious. He then takes him to the hospital and learns he is going to need ₹ 5 lakhs to save him as he almost inadvertently killed him.

So Satyam enters the house of Divya's billionaire father, pretending to be his long-lost son Madhavan. He clears all confusion, reunites Madhavan with his dad and convinces Divya to let go of him. Prakash finds out about Sathyam and plans to kill him. Madhavan and Sathyam defeat Prakash and hand him over to the Police. Sathyam marries Meena and returns to his home with success.

== Cast ==
- Murali as Madhavan (guest appearance)
- Prabhu Deva as Sathyam (Sathya)
- Laila as Divya
- Neha Bajpai as Meenakshi (Meena)
- Prakash Raj as Prakash, Sathyam's cousin
- Vivek as Tamil Kirukkan
- Moulee as Lakshmipathi
- Rajeev as Ramanathan (Divya's Father)
- Hemanth Ravan as Sharma
- Mahanadi Shankar as a Police inspector
- Balu Anand as Ramanathan
- Laxmi Rattan as Doctor Chezhiyan
- Baby Kalyani as Julie
- Kottachi as Tamil Kirukkan's friend
- Muthukaalai as Servant
- Jayamani as Mestri
- Indhu as a Construction worker
- Shanthi Williams as Kannamma
- Tharini as Julie's mother
- Priyanka as Servant
- Lekhasri as a Construction worker
- Kaka Gopal

Uncredited

- Meenal as Sudha
- A. C. Murali Mohan as TV Host
- Vengal Rao as Henchman
- Kili Ramachandran as Shop owner
- Bonda Mani as Sri Lankan Tamil man
- Dhadha Muthukumar as Old man
- Siva Narayana Murthy as Company manager
- Minnal Deepa as Hospital receptionist
- Surjith Ansary as Schoolboy

== Production ==
Alli Thandha Vaanam is the directorial debut of Sreedhar Prasad. The role played by Murali was initially intended to be played by Karthik. Similarly Laila replaced Sneha in the lead female role.

== Soundtrack ==
The soundtrack was composed by Vidyasagar. "Kannalay Miya Miya" is the first released song for singer Srivardhini. Vidyasagar later reused "Vaadi Vaadi" as "Elu Elu Eloroda" for Telugu film Ottesi Cheputunna. The hook music of "Vaadi Vaadi" was used in song "Aa Re Pritam Pyare" in the Hindi film Rowdy Rathore.

Track listing
No.	Title	Lyrics	Singer(s)	Length
1.	"Chennai Pattanam (Kasu Kasu)"	Kabilan	Udit Narayan, Sruthi Unnikrishnan	4:44
2.	"Kannalay Miya Miya"	Arivumathi	Unni Menon, Srivardhini	4:54
3.	"Thom Thom"	Arivumathi	Hariharan, Harini, K. S. Chithra	4:57
4.	"Chikku Chikku Joy"	Palani Bharathi	Tippu	4:25
5.	"Anthi Karukkayilae"	Arivumathi	Swarnalatha	2:35
6.	"Thattan Kidaikaiyiliyo"	Arivumathi	Swarnalatha	3:15
7.	"Vaadi Vaadi Naattu Katta"	Arivumathi	Shankar Mahadevan, Sujatha Mohan	4:25
8.	"Chennai Pattanam" (film version)	Kabilan	Kartik	4:44
Total length:				29:15

== Reception ==
Cinesouth wrote, "The director has presented the audience with eye-catching dances pleasant songs and endearing comedy in ample measure. But one sadly misses out a screenplay of quality". Reviewing the Telugu dubbed version Satti, Idlebrain.com wrote, "The first 15 minutes of the film is good. The rest of the film is boring, expect for occasional good moments by Prabhu Deva. On a whole, it is a badly made film".
