= Viji (screenwriter) =

Director/Writer

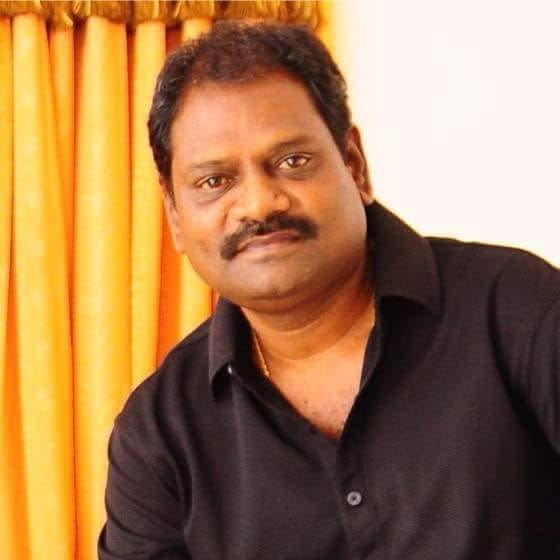
- Born: Arun Prasad; Thanjavur, Tamil Nadu India
- Education: Poondi Pushpam College, Thanjavur
- Occupations: Film Director; Screenwriter
- Years active: 2001–present
- Spouse: Chandra
- Children: 2

Viji is an Indian screenwriter and director who predominantly works in Tamil cinema. His movies embody a theme of celebrating life laced with humor, satire and emotions. His work has attracted accolades from literary circles, social activists, politicians, film critics and audience alike. Viji either as writer or writer and director has tried his hands in a variety of genres and themes exploring entertainers (Azhagiya Theeye, Maayavi, Mozhi), Family Emotions (36 Vayadhinile), satire (Vellithirai), commercial (Majaa, Adanga Maru, GOAT) and social issues (Gouravam) leaving his mark with his sharp, timed dialogues. His works have been nominated and won for several awards viz., Vikatan Awards.

== Filmography ==
Key
†	Denotes films that have not yet been released

=== As film director ===
Year	Film	Notes
2001	Alli Thandha Vaanam	As Sridhar Prasad
2008	Vellithirai	

=== As dialogue writer ===
Year	Film	Notes
2002	Bala	
2004	Azhagiya Theeye	
2005	Ponniyin Selvan	
2005	Maayavi	
2005	Majaa	
2007	Mozhi	
2013	Gouravam	
2014	Un Samayal Arayil	
2015	36 Vayadhinile	
2018	60 Vayathu Maaniram	
2018	Adanga Maru	
2019	Captain Marvel	Tamil dubbed version
2021	Vinodhaya Sitham	Zee5 Web movie
2024	The Greatest of All Time	

== Awards ==
Awards

Year	Award	Film	Role
2004	Film Today Awards	Azhagiya Theeye	
2004	MGR SHIVAJI Academy Awards	Azhagiya Theeye	
2007	Ananda Vikatan Awards	Mozhi	
2007	Star Vijay Awards	Mozhi	
2007	V4 Popular Awards	Mozhi	
2007	Film Critics Awards	Mozhi	
2015	MGR SHIVAJI Academy Awards	36 Vayadhinile	
