= Mumbai Police (film) =

2013 Indian film by Rosshan Andrrews

- Directed by: Rosshan Andrrews
- Written by: Bobby–Sanjay
- Produced by: Nisad Haneefa
- Starring: Prithviraj Sukumaran; Jayasurya; Rahman
- Cinematography: R. Diwakaran
- Edited by: Mahesh Narayan
- Music by: Gopi Sundar
- Production company: Nisad Haneefa Productions
- Distributed by: Central Pictures
- Release date: 3 May 2013
- Running time: 145 minutes
- Country: India
- Language: Malayalam
- Budget: ₹5.75 crore

Mumbai Police is a 2013 Indian Malayalam-language neo-noir psychological thriller film written by Bobby–Sanjay and directed by Rosshan Andrrews. It stars Prithviraj Sukumaran, Jayasurya, and Rahman in the lead roles, along with Kunjan, Aparna Nair, Deepa Vijayan, and debutant Hima Davis in supporting roles. Shweta Menon and Riyaz Khan appear in guest roles. The film was remade into action thrillers in Telugu as Hunt (2023) by Mahesh Surapaneni and in Hindi as Deva (2025) by the director himself.

The film is produced by Nisad Haneefa and co-produced by Nivas Haneef and Niyas Haneefa. The background score was composed by Gopi Sundar and the cinematography was handled by G. Diwakaran. The film was edited by Mahesh Narayanan. Mumbai Police was completed filming in 56 days, when the original schedule was for 60 days. The budget was ₹5.75 crores. The Khaleej Times identified Mumbai Police as one of the "remarkable box-office success[es]" of 2013.

== Plot ==
In 2013, ACP of Kochi, Antony Moses, aka Rascal Moses, is involved in an accident that causes him partial memory loss. Before the accident, he was on a call with his brother-in-law, Farhan Aman, the Commissioner of Police. He informs Farhan that he has solved the murder case of his friend, Assistant Commissioner Aaryan John Jacob, who was killed during a gallantry awards ceremony at the police parade ground. However, before disclosing the murderer's name, the accident occurs, resulting in his memory loss.

Farhan tells Antony about his past and the tragedy that befell their friend Aaryan. Together, the trio had been known as the 'Mumbai Police' owing to their earlier presence in the Mumbai police department. Given Antony's impressive capabilities as a police officer, Farhan reassigns him to the case despite his condition.

As Antony retraces his past investigation, he notices discrepancies between his new findings and the direction his old self had taken. He reexamines evidence, revisits witness statements, and reconstructs the crime scene, but certain details do not align. During this process, he also discovers that he had been in a relationship with a male flight attendant. Upon confronting his partner, Antony learns that, on the night before the awards ceremony, Aaryan had walked in on them in an intimate moment. Aaryan was upset—not because of Antony's sexuality but because Antony had hidden this part of his life from him despite their close friendship. The two had a heated argument, after which Aaryan stormed out.

After Aaryan left, Antony's boyfriend started to panic, as homosexuality was not only illegal at the time but also a taboo, making Antony anxious as well. In his paranoia, Antony irrationally convinced himself that Aaryan would expose his secret during his speech at the ceremony.

Having uncovered the motive behind Aaryan's murder, Antony deduces that he himself was the killer. His past self had premeditated the murder, installing a remote-controlled automatic rifle on a rooftop overlooking the stage and shooting his friend with a tap on his phone during the gallantry awards ceremony. Upon revealing all of this to Farhan, it is shown that Farhan already knew he was the culprit, as the old Antony had confessed on the call right before the accident. However, Farhan needed Antony's investigative brilliance to solve the case once again.

Accepting responsibility for his old self's actions, Antony surrenders to the police.

== Cast ==
- Prithviraj Sukumaran as ACP Antony Moses IPS
- Jayasurya as ACP Aaryan John Jacob IPS
- Rahman as Commissioner Farhan Aman IPS
- Aparna Nair as ASP Rakhee Menon IPS
- Riyaz Khan as a Sharpshooter
- Kunchan as ASI Sudhakaran Nair
- Mukundan as Captain Srivinas
- Chali Pala as DySP Karunakaran
- Nihal Pillai as Antony's boyfriend
- Harish Uthaman as Roy
- Captain Raju as IG Gopinathan Nair
- Swetha Menon as Doctor
- Deepa Vijayan as Annie Farhan

== Production ==
Shooting started in January 2013, and finished on schedule by March. Mumbai Police completed filming in 56 days, when the original schedule was for 60 days. The expected budget was ₹6 crores but was completed with a production cost of ₹5.75 crores.

The film was released in May 2013.

== Reception ==
Sify.com called Mumbai Police one of the best recent Malayalam films. Paresh of Rediff.com called the film a "good suspense thriller which will make history for its interesting story." Aswin of The Times of India says that the film "arrests and engages the audience with bold portrayals from a well-chosen cast."
