= Mahesh Narayanan =

Indian film director and editor

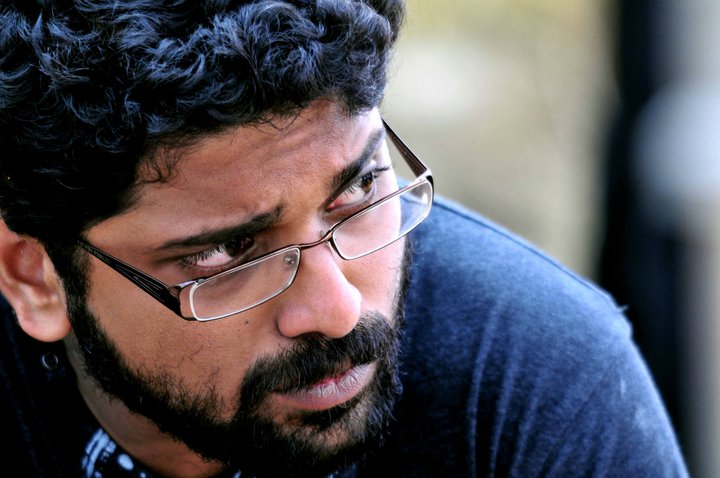
- Mahesh in 2011
- Born: 2 May 1982 (age 44); Thiruvananthapuram, Kerala, India
- Education: University College Thiruvananthapuram; M.G.R. Government Film and Television Training Institute
- Occupations: Director; Film editor; Screenwriter; Cinematographer
- Years active: 2007–present
- Spouse: Ramya
- Children: 1
- Awards: Kerala State Film Award for Best Debut Director (2017); Kerala State Film Award for Best Director (2022)

Mahesh Narayanan (born 2 May 1982) is an Indian film director, screenwriter, editor and cinematographer who predominantly works in Malayalam cinema, he has also worked in Tamil and Hindi films. He is a recipient of the Kerala State Film Award for Best Debut Director (2017) and Kerala State Film Award for Best Director (2022).

He is best known for his editing in Vishwaroopam and Vishwaroopam II, directed by Kamal Haasan. His best works as a director include Take Off (2017) C U Soon (2020) Malik (2021) and Ariyippu (2022)

== Career ==
After completing his graduation from University College Thiruvananthapuram; Mahesh Narayanan joined M.G.R. Government Film and Television Training Institute in Tamil Nadu after which he started working as an advert editor. He subsequently progressed to editing documentaries, short films and entered the film industry with Rathri Mazha, a Malayalam film which won five Kerala State Film Awards.

A few of his most popular films as an editor includes Beautiful, Traffic, Kanyaka Talkies, Viswaroopam, and Ennu Ninte Moideen. After establishing himself as an accomplished and successful editor, Mahesh ventured into writing and made his debut as a writer with 2015 Malayalam film Mili, which opened to rave reviews in Kerala.

In 2017 Mahesh progressed into film-making directing his debut feature Take Off, a 2017 Indian drama thriller film, based on the ordeal of Indian nurses in the city of Tikrit, Iraq, in 2014 with Parvathy Thiruvothu, Kunchacko Boban and Fahadh Faasil starring in the lead roles. It is written by Mahesh and P. V. Shajikumar. The film was shot in various parts of Dubai and Kerala. Take Off was released on 24 March 2017. The film was a blockbuster at the box office grossing ₹40 crore and running for over 125 days in theaters. The film was in the competition section at various international festivals, including International Film Festival of India and International Film Festival of Kerala. The film won a Special Jury Award at the 48th International Film Festival of India. The film won five Kerala State Awards including the Best Debut Director's Award for Mahesh Narayanan.

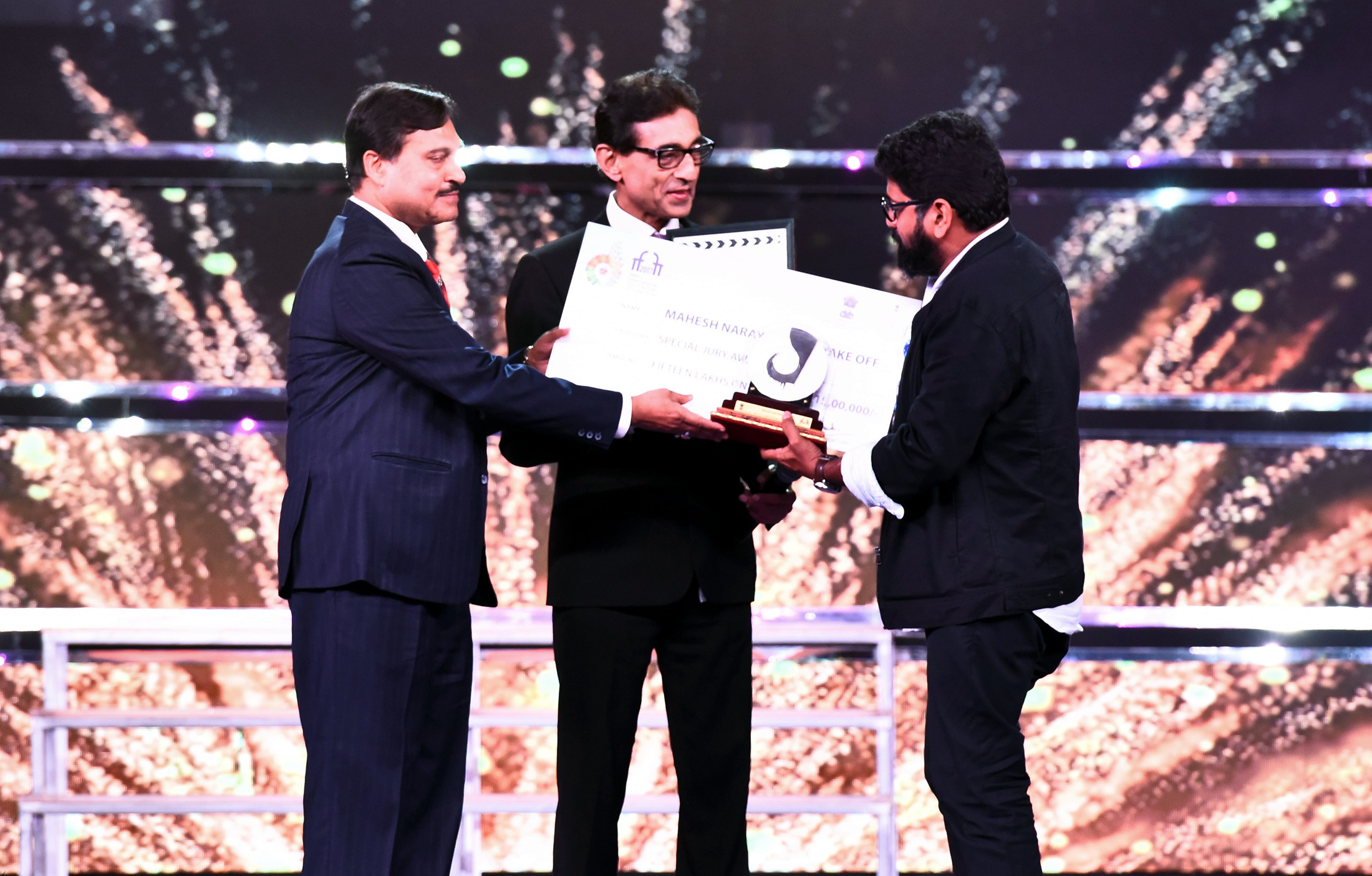
The Special Jury Award of International Film Festival Of India 2017 was presented to Director Mahesh Narayanan for the film TakeOff, which is based on the ordeal of Indian nurses in the city of Tikrit, Iraq.

In June 2020, Mahesh announced that his next venture would be en experimental one titled C U Soon, starring Fahadh Faasil in a lead role. Mahesh described the film as a small exercise using an iPhone rather than a feature film. It was also revealed that the film would be about 60–65 minutes (the final release time amounted to 1h 38min) in length, and shot in Faasil's flat. Although the film got approval from the Film Employees Federation of Kerala (FEFKA), the Kerala Film Producers Association (KFPA) was opposed to the shoot with regards to the disruptions caused by the COVID-19 pandemic. Despite this, filming was successfully completed on 21 August. Upon its OTT release in Amazon prime Video the film received positive reviews from the critics. It is India's first computer screen film. C U Soon was screened under the category of screen-life at the 42nd Moscow International Film Festival

== Personal life ==
Mahesh was born in Thiruvananthapuram to Dr. Geetha and Narayanan. He has a younger brother named Dr.Ganesh Narayanan. He is married to Ramya and has one daughter.

== Awards ==
- 2023: Kerala State Film Award for Best Director -Ariyippu
- Special Jury, Silver Peacock Award at IFFI 2017
- 65th National Film Awards, Special Mention for Take Off
- Kerala State Film Award for Best Debut Director
- Best Screenplay Award at SCO Film Festival, Qingdao, China
- Audience Choice Award at Indian Film Festival of Los Angeles, Los Angeles, 2018
- Vanitha Film Awards 2018 – Best Movie – Take Off
- Asiavision Award 2017 for the Best Director – Take Off
- Asianet Film Award 2018 for Best Director – Take Off
- Asianet Film Awards 2015 for Best Editor – Ennu Ninte Moideen
- 9th South Indian International Movie Awards for Best Director – C U Soon
- 10th South Indian International Movie Awards for Best Director – Malik

== Filmography ==
Key
†	Denotes films that have not yet been released

- All films are in Malayalam-language, unless otherwise noted.

Year	Title	Editor	Director	Screenwriter	Notes
2007	Rathri Mazha	Yes	No	No	
2008	Positive	Yes	No	No	
2008	Phir Kabhi	Yes	No	No	Hindi film
2009	Kavya's Diary	Yes	No	No	Telugu film
2009	16 mm: Memories, Movement and a Machine	Yes	No	No	English film
2009	Gulumaal: The Escape	Yes	No	No	
2010	Plus Two	Yes	No	No	
2010	Pokkiri Raja	Yes	No	No	
2010	Kaaryasthan	Yes	No	No	
2011	Makaramanju	Yes	No	No	
2011	Seniors	Yes	No	No	
2011	A Pestering Journey	Yes	No	No	English film
2011	The Metro	Yes	No	No	
2011	Three Kings	Yes	No	No	
2011	Karayilekku Oru Kadal Dooram	Yes	No	No	
2011	Beautiful	Yes	No	No	
2011	Traffic	Yes	No	No	
2012	Mallu Singh	Yes	No	No	
2012	Mr. Marumakan	Yes	No	No	
2012	Casanovva	Yes	No	No	
2012	Trivandrum Lodge	Yes	No	No	
2013	Natholi Oru Cheriya Meenalla	Yes	No	No	
2013	Kammath & Kammath	Yes	No	No	
2013	Chennaiyil Oru Naal	Yes	No	No	Tamil film
2013	Olipporu	Yes	No	No	
2013	Vishwaroopam	Yes	No	No	Best Editor at Jagran Film Festival 2013; Hindi-Tamil bilingual film
2013	Mumbai Police	Yes	No	No	
2013	Sound Thoma	Yes	No	No	
2014	How Old Are You?	Yes	No	No	
2014	Cousins	Yes	No	No	
2015	Mili	Yes	No	Yes	Also Writer
2015	36 Vayadhinile	Yes	No	No	Tamil film Remake of How Old Are You?
2015	Nirnayakam	Yes	No	No	
2015	Love 24x7	Yes	No	No	
2015	Ennu Ninte Moideen	Yes	No	No	
2016	Traffic	Yes	No	No	Hindi film
2017	Udaharanam Sujatha	Yes	No	No	
2017	Take Off	Yes	Yes	Yes	Kerala State Film Award for Best Debut Director
2018	B.Tech	Yes	No	No	
2018	Abrahaminte Santhathikal	Yes	No	No	
2018	Vishwaroopam II	Yes	No	No	Hindi-Tamil bilingual film
2019	Uyare	Yes	No	No	
2020	C U Soon	Yes	Yes	Yes	Amazon Prime film; Also cinematographer
2021	Aarkkariyam	Yes	No	No	
2021	Nayattu	Yes	No	No	
2021	Malik	Yes	Yes	Yes	Amazon Prime film
2022	Malayankunju	No	No	Yes	Also cinematographer
2022	Ariyippu	Yes	Yes	Yes	Also co-producer
2024	Manorathangal	No	Yes	Yes	Segment: Sherleck
2025	Thalavara	No	No	No	As producer
2026	Patriot	Yes	Yes	Yes	
TBA	Phantom Hospital †	Yes	Yes	Yes	Directorial debut; Hindi film; Also writer
