= Velli Thirai =

Indian satirical drama film

- Directed by: Viji
- Written by: Viji
- Based on: Udayananu Tharam (Malayalam)
- Produced by: Prakash Raj
- Starring: Prithviraj Sukumaran; Prakash Raj; Gopika
- Cinematography: M. V. Panneerselvam; K. V. Guhan
- Edited by: M. Kasi Vishwanathan
- Music by: G. V. Prakash Kumar
- Distributed by: Duet Films
- Release date: 7 March 2008
- Running time: 152 minutes
- Country: India
- Language: Tamil

Velli Thirai (transl. Silver Screen) is a 2008 Indian Tamil-language satirical drama film directed by debutant Viji, the dialogue writer for Radha Mohan's films, and produced by Prakash Raj. It is the Tamil remake of the 2005 Malayalam film Udayananu Tharam. The film stars Prithviraj Sukumaran and Gopika in the lead roles, along with Prakash Raj in a prominent role.

Principal photography took place in locations in India, Indonesia, and Australia. The film score and soundtrack were composed by G. V. Prakash Kumar, with many songs altered from the original. The film was released on 7 March 2008 and failed to do well at the Tamil Nadu box office. It marked Gopika's final Tamil film till date.

== Plot ==
Saravanan, a struggling assistant director, goes to Hyderabad in hopes of pursuing his dream. His roommate, Kanniah copies his script and gives it to a producer. Kanniah tells the producer that he wants to star in the film himself. The producer agrees to the condition after seeing the script. Kanniah becomes famous due to the film and is rechristened Dilipkanth (inspired by the name Rajinikanth). Saravanan does not give up and creates another story. However, he finds out that he cannot make his film unless Dileep plays the hero. Because of this, they lead into minor problems, which annoy Saravanan and their team. The shooting starts with Dileep as the hero but is halted midway, owing to various tantrums thrown by the new opportunistic hero. Determined to finish the movie, Saravanan seeks the help of his crew and friends in the cinema industry. Unknown to Dileep, Saravanan and his crew manipulate him into situations that match the storyline of the movie they are shooting for and capture Dileep's live reactions. They manage to fool Dileep and finish shooting the climax of the film even as the self-claimed new star makes a fool of himself. A few days later, he is invited to watch the premiere of the movie and is shocked to see the recent events of his life unfold on the silver screen. He soon realizes the effort put in by Saravanan and the crew and feels humbled. He genuinely acknowledges the talent of the director and leaves the place, apologizing to Saravanan for his pathetic behavior and agreeing that Saravanan is better than him in a very mannered way.

== Cast ==
- Prithviraj Sukumaran as Director Saravanan
- Prakash Raj as Kannaiah / Actor Dilipkanth (Dileep)
- Gopika as Actress Mythili
- M. S. Bhaskar as Ram Gopal Sharma
- Sarath Babu as Balaji
- Elango Kumaravel as Musthafa
- Charle as Assistant Director Santhanam
- Sampath Raj as Dinesh
- Avinash as Reddy
- Sathyan as Driver Thirupathi
- Thaadi Balaji
- Sriranjani as Mythili's mother
- Jayaprakash as Producer
- Ajay Raj as Crew member

Cameos

- Prathap Pothan as himself
- Ravi Mohan
- Trisha
- Lakshmi Rai as actress Lakshmi
- Sandhya
- Swarnamalya as anchor
- Shama Sikander as dancer
- Manobala
- Adithyan

== Production ==
After the success of Mozhi (2007), Moser Baer, who released the DVD of Mozhi under their company, collaborated with Duet Movies and launched three projects in 2007 with Vellithirai being one of them.

== Soundtrack ==
Velli Thirai

Soundtrack album by G. V. Prakash Kumar
- Released: 2007
- Genre: Feature film soundtrack

G. V. Prakash Kumar chronology
Evano Oruvan (2007)	Velli Thirai (2007)	Kaalai (2007)

The soundtrack consisted of five songs composed by G. V. Prakash. The song "Sooriyane" is based on "Somebody Like You" by Keith Urban.

Song title	Singers	Lyrics
"Kanchi Paanai"	K. S. Chitra, Jassie Gift	Kabilan
"Sooriyane"	Lucky Ali, Rahul Nambiar	Yugabharathi
"Thaiyya Thaiyya"	Shreya Ghoshal	Kabilan
"Uyirilae"	Naresh Iyer	Na. Muthukumar
"Vizhiyilae"	K. S. Chitra	Palani Bharathi

== Reception ==
Rediff wrote "Watch Vellithirai for some good old cat-and-mouse games in the movie industry with well-timed punches. The magic of the silver screen rarely disappoints". Sify wrote "On the whole Vellithira is not a faithful remake and therein lies its pitfalls, but at the same time it is a breezy fun movie".
