= Bobby–Sanjay =

Indian screenwriter

- Born: Kerala, India
- Occupation: Screenwriter
- Years active: 1998–present
- Parent: Prem Prakash

Bobby Prakash and Sanjay Prakash are an Indian screenwriter duo working in Malayalam cinema. They are the sons of the actor Prem Prakash and the nephew of actor Jose Prakash.

== Career ==
=== Films ===
Bobby and Sanjay are scriptwriters in Malayalam films. They started their film career by scripting Sibi Malayil's Ente Veedu Appuvinteyum (2003). Their second bigscreen venture Notebook (2006) was directed by Rosshan Andrrews. They were able to incorporate several contemporary themes including teenage pregnancy in the film, which has a cult following amongst youngsters of Kerala. In 2010, they scripted the film Traffic. They worked for more than two years to complete the scripting of Traffic, which was inspired by true incidents. The film was very well received in Kerala. They associated again with Rosshan Andrrews for the film Casanovva (2012), which was one of the costliest Malayalam films of the time. The film was met with scathing reviews and dismal box office collections and was voted as one of the most disappointing films of the year 2012. Their next work Ayalum Njanum Thammil, directed by Lal Jose centred on a committed senior doctor and an irresponsible junior doctor and, the film, through their relationship, portrayed the medical profession. The film was one of the most successful films of the year and won numerous accolades including four Kerala State Film Awards. In 2013, they associated for the third time with Rosshan Andrrews in the film Mumbai Police. The film was a huge box office success and earned very good reviews; a critic from Sify.com called the film "one of the best films to have emerged from Malayalam cinema in a long time." In 2014, they associated with Rosshan Andrrews for the fourth time, in How Old Are You, which marked the return of ace actress Manju Warrier to cinema after a sabbatical of over a decade.

=== Television ===
Bobby and Sanjay scripted the television serial Avicharitham (2004), that was telecast in Asianet for a period of 40 days. The serial won them critical acclaim and several accolades including the TV Critics Awards. Bobby and Sanjay had also scripted for a serial named Avasthantharangal (Mikhayelinte Santhathikal). The lead role in this serial was played by their uncle and veteran actor Jose Prakash.

== Filmography ==
Year	Name	Director	Notes
2003	Ente Veedu Appuvinteyum	Sibi Malayil	Remade in Tamil as Kannadi Pookal
2006	Notebook	Rosshan Andrrews	
2011	Traffic	Rajesh Pillai	Won:Kerala State Film Award for Best Screenplay; Won:Kerala Film Critics Award for Best Script; Won:Lohithadas Award for Best Script; Won:Asianet Film Award for Best Script; Won:Asiavision Movie Award for Best Screenplay; Won: Mathrubhumi Film Award for Best Screenplay; Won:Kochi Times Award for Best Script; Won:Amrita Film Award for Best Script; Won:Reporter TV Film Award for Best Script
2012	Casanovva	Rosshan Andrrews	
2012	Ayalum Njanum Thammil	Lal Jose	Won:Amritha TV Award for Best Screenplay; Won:Reporter TV Award for Best Screenplay
2013	Mumbai Police	Rosshan Andrrews	Won:Kerala State Film Award for Best Screenplay
2014	How Old Are You	Rosshan Andrrews	Won:Kerala Film Critics Association Awards (2015) - Best Script; Won:Mangalam Film Awards - Best Screenplay -Remade in Tamil as 36 Vayadhinile
2015	Nirnnayakam	V. K. Prakash	
2016	School Bus	Rosshan Andrrews	
2018	Kayamkulam Kochunni	Rosshan Andrrews	
2019	Uyare	Manu Ashokan	
2019	Evidey	K K Rajeev	Story only
2021	Mohan Kumar Fans	Jis Joy	Story only
2021	One	Santhosh Viswanath	
2021	Kaanekkaane	Manu Ashokan	
2022	Salute	Rosshan Andrrews	
2022	Innale Vare	Jis Joy	Story only
2023	Kolla	Suraj Varma	Story only
2025	Deva	Rosshan Andrrews	Hindi film
2026	Baby Girl	Arun Varma	

== Television ==
Name	Year	Director	Channel	Cast
Avasthantharangal	2001	Jude Attipetty	Kairali TV	Jose Prakash, Jyothirmayi, K. P. A. C. Lalitha
Avicharitham	2004	K. K. Rajeev	Asianet	Srividya, Prem Prakash, Suvarna Mathew
Aagneyam	2009	K. K. Rajeev	Doordarshan	Prem Prakash, Meera Krishna, Souparnika Subash
Eshwaran Saakshiyayi	2015	K. K. Rajeev	Flowers TV	Prem Prakash, Divya Prabha, Reena
Avaril Oraal	2017–2018	Jayaraj Vijay	Surya TV	Sruthi Lakshmi, Sreejith Vijay, Rajani Chandy, Delna Davis
