= Notebook (2006 film) =

2006 film by Rosshan Andrrews

- Promotional poster
- Directed by: Rosshan Andrrews
- Written by: Bobby-Sanjay
- Produced by: P. V. Gangadharan
- Starring: Maria Roy; Roma Asrani; Parvathy Thiruvothu
- Cinematography: R. Diwakaran
- Edited by: Ranjan Abraham
- Music by: Songs: Mejo Joseph; Score: Gopi Sundar
- Production company: Grihalakshmi Productions
- Distributed by: Kalpaka Films
- Release date: 15 December 2006
- Running time: 150 minutes
- Country: India
- Language: Malayalam
- Budget: ₹3.50 crore

Notebook is a 2006 Indian Malayalam-language coming-of-age drama film directed by Rosshan Andrrews and written by Bobby-Sanjay. It is about three students at a boarding school, and how they face up to challenges in their lives. The film stars Maria Roy, Roma Asrani and Parvathy Thiruvothu alongside Skanda Ashok anr Suresh Gopi. The film dealt with the subject of teenage pregnancy. It marked the debut of Roma and Skanda in the Malayalam film industry. The songs were composed by Mejo Joseph while Gopi Sundar handled the score. The cinematography and editing was handled by R. Diwakaran and Ranjan Abraham. The film was released on 15 December 2006. It received positive reviews and was a commercial success at the box office. The film won the Kerala State Film Award for Second Best Film and Filmfare Award for Best Film – Malayalam.

== Plot ==
The story begins with a New Year's Eve celebration at Lord's Academy in Ooty while three friends- Saira Elizabeth, Pooja Krishna and Sridevi Swaminathan - plant a sapling to symbolize their friendship even after they graduate from school. Three years later, the trio is in 12th grade, and the sapling they planted has grown into a tree Venus (named after the goddess of love).

The girls come from different family backgrounds — Saira from a broken home, with separated parents yet maintaining a bold character; Sridevi, a Brahmin girl who is very kind and sensitive from a happy, close-knit family, with her parents doting on her; and Pooja, the ambitious one who is the school-head girl and is a single parented child staying with her mother in Ooty. Sridevi falls in love with a schoolmate, Sooraj Menon. Though hesitant at first, Saira and Pooja approve of their relationship after being convinced of Sooraj's sincerity.

During an excursion to Goa, Sreedevi and Sooraj make love, and eventually, she becomes pregnant, much to the shock of Saira and Pooja and herself. They keep the news to themselves, fearing the sorrow and wrath of Sridevi's parents; even Sooraj is kept in the dark, for fear that the news may leak out, and he will simply leave the school. They decide to go for an abortion at a hospital near their school at Pooja's suggestion. During the Founder's Day celebrations at the school, the trio sneak out of the campus and reach the hospital. Saira convinces the gynecologist to conduct the abortion by telling several lies, including that Sridevi had been raped. During the procedure, Sridevi suffers excessive blood loss and dies. Saira and Pooja flee the hospital in terror and return to school.

The next day, the two girls are summoned to the principal's office, where the police have arrived, and the gynecologist, brought as a part of the inquiry, identifies Saira. Saira confesses that the rape story was a lie and Sridevi had sex with somebody she loves, but she maintains she does not know who that person is. Pooja, concerned about her future, distances herself from the whole episode, saying she knew nothing about it, leaving Saira betrayed and angry. Concerned about the reputation of the school, the principal presses the cops for not registering a case and dismisses Saira from the school, announcing in the assembly that Sridevi died in a car accident when she and Saira sneaked out to watch a movie during school hours and that Saira is responsible for it. Sooraj learns the truth about Sridevi's demise, but her parents do not pursue the case. Pooja, now remorseful of her denial, tries to apologize to Saira but meets with hostility. Pooja loses her mental stability, unable to take the pressure of having lost both her best friends — one to death and the other to her betrayal. Saira's father, Brigadier Alexander, arrives and takes her to New Delhi for further studies, inspiring her to move on with life.

Six years later, at Saira's graduation from medical college, a letter arrives, addressed to Sridevi, informing her that Pooja was in a mental asylum for six years, and she needs Saira's company. It is also learned that one of their classmates, Feroz, is now a famous music director. Saira immediately returns to Ooty with her father to meet Pooja, who has been looked after for the last six years by her mother with Sooraj's help. They realize how much they miss each other and cycle to their school that very night to see Venus (the tree they had planted during their school days), as Sridevi's spirit is seen watching them.

== Cast ==
- Maria Roy as Sreedevi Swaminathan
- Roma Asrani as Saira Elizabeth
  - Voiceover by Sreeja Ravi
- Parvathy Thiruvothu as Pooja Krishna
- Skanda Ashok as Sooraj Menon, Sreedevi's lover
  - Voice-over by Vineeth Sreenivasan
- Suresh Gopi as Brigadier Alexander, Saira's father
- Bobby Hanspal as Fr. Antony, school principal
- Aishwarya as Elizabeth, Sarah's mother
- Seetha as Pooja's mother
- Prem Prakash as Swaminathan, Sreedevi's father
- Sukanya as Sreedevi's mother
- Raveendran as Doctor
- Baiju V.K. as Police Inspector Jacob
- Mejo Joseph as Firoz Ahmed, a student
- Vani Kishore as Anna Xavier, a student
- Arathi as Swapna
- Aparna Nair as TV Journalist

== Production ==
The filming was primarily held at The Lawrence School, Lovedale, Ooty. The director, Roshan Andrews, says "Although it cost a fortune to shoot there, it turned out to be perfect. I had visited many schools in Kerala, but couldn't find what I wanted." The other filming locations were the Medical College Ground and the Indian Institute of Management in Kozhikode. The casting of the film was done through open calls. According to the director, the cast was selected from 5000 applicants. The film was produced by Grihalakshmi Films, a production house known for family dramas. The budget of the film was ₹18 million.

== Music ==
All the songs were composed by debutant Mejo Joseph, while another debutant Gopi Sunder composed the background music for the film.

- "Hrudayavum" – Vineeth Sreenivasan, Jyotsna
- "Changathikoottam" – Rimi Tomy, Sayanora Philip, Afsal, Vidhu Prathap
- "Iniyum" – K. J. Yesudas, Manjari
- "As We All Know" – Donan, Ramya, Swapna, Vinaita
- "As We All Know (Remix)" – Rhea

== Release ==
The film was released on 15 December 2006.

== Reception ==
=== Critical response ===
Reviewer from Sify, while complementing Andrews for taking up a taboo subject and casting newcomers, found the film unimpressive as a whole, and gave the verdict as "Ho-hum, just average". The Varnachitram.com review was generally positive, calling it an "interesting movie." However, the reviewer felt that "[i]t takes the whole of the first half to reach the first plot point." He goes on to state that "[t]he line in the story would have read "Boy and Girl fall in love", but stretching it to the entire first half was, lets say a stretch." The reviewer lauded the direction and screenplay when the major theme of the film is dealt with. He also credited the director for "extracting great performances out of newcomers." The OneIndia.com review, though at first comments that "[t]here are times when you might feel as if the director is very obsessed with periods and pregnancy than the story itself", later adds that "the film's real theme seems to be something very relevant in today's changing times—the need for a strong family and support base."

Rediff.com review was generally negative. The reviewer felt that "[t]he single biggest handicap this film suffers from is the fact that none of the characters are real, believable." However, he adds "[t]he bright spot is that the bunch of newcomers put in some exuberance into the otherwise turgid film." There was almost universal praise for the music of the film by debutant Mejo Joseph, who also plays a part in the film, and for the cinematography by C. Diwakar. In an interview, the director revealed that "[s]even of Malayalam's best-known directors—Priyadarshan, Sathyan Anthikad, Sibi Malayil, Joshy, Jayaraj, Lal Jose and I. V. Sasi—saw the film and personally called [him] up and said it was not only good but was touching."

=== Box office ===
The film was made on a budget of ₹3.75 crore. It had a slow start at the box-office, but collections gradually picked up. It gained a distributor's share of ₹13.8 million from 35 screens in the first week. The film completed 150 days of theatrical run.

== Accolades ==
2006 Kerala State Film Awards

- Second Best Film – Rosshan Andrrews and P. V. Gangadharan
- Best Costume Designer – B. Sai

2006 Filmfare Awards South

- Best Film – P. V. Gangadharan
- Best Supporting Actress – Roma Asrani

2006 Asianet Film Awards

- Best New Face of the Year (Male) – Skanda Ashok
- Best New Face of the Year (Female) – Roma Asrani
