= List of awards and nominations received by Nithya Menen =

Nithya Menen awards and nominations
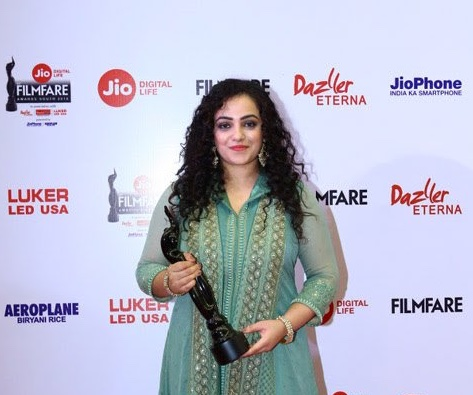
- Menen at 65th Filmfare Awards South in 2017
Awards and nominations
| Award | Wins | Nominations |
| National Film Awards | 1 | 1 |
| Filmfare Awards South | 4 | 15 |
| South Indian International Movie Awards | 2 | 12 |
| Nandi Awards | 2 | 2 |
| Hyderabad Times Film Awards | 2 | 2 |

Totals (Note: Certain award groups do not simply award one winner. They acknowledge several different recipients, have runners-up, and have third place. Since this is a specific recognition and is different from losing an award, runner-up mentions are considered wins in this award tally. For simplification and to avoid errors, each award in this list has been presumed to have had a prior nomination.)
- Wins: 13
- Nominations: 43

Nithya Menen is an Indian actress and singer who works primarily in Tamil, Telugu and Malayalam films. She has acted in few Kannada movies also. Menen is a recipient of several accolades including a National Film Award, four Filmfare Awards South, two South Indian International Movie Awards and two Nandi Awards.

Menen won the Filmfare Award for Best Actress – Telugu for Gunde Jaari Gallanthayyinde (2013), Critics Best Actress – Telugu for Malli Malli Idi Rani Roju (2015), Best Supporting Actress – Tamil for Mersal (2016) and Critics Best Actress – Tamil for Thiruchitrambalam (2023). Menen also won the Nandi Award for Best Actress for Ala Modalaindi (2011) and Special Jury Award for Malli Malli Idi Rani Roju. Menen further won the National Film Award for Best Actress for her performance in Thiruchitrambalam.

== Ananda Vikatan Cinema Awards ==
Menen has received one Ananda Vikatan Cinema Awards nomination.

| Year | Category | Film | Result | Ref. |
|---|---|---|---|---|
| 2023 | Best Actress | Thiruchitrambalam | Nominated | |

== Chennai Times Film Awards ==
Menen has received one Chennai Times Film Awards nomination.

| Year | Category | Film | Result | Ref. |
|---|---|---|---|---|
| 2012 | Promising Newcomer – Female | Nootrenbadhu | Nominated | |

== Chittara Star Awards ==
Menen has received one Chittara Star Awards nomination.

| Year | Category | Work | Result | Ref. |
|---|---|---|---|---|
| 2025 | Pride of Karnataka | —N/a | Nominated | |

== CineMAA Awards ==
Menen has won one CineMAA Awards.

| Year | Category | Film | Result | Ref. |
|---|---|---|---|---|
| 2013 | Best Actress – Critics | Ishq | Won | |

== Critics' Choice Film Awards ==
Menen has received one Critics' Choice Film Awards nomination.

| Year | Category | Film | Result | Ref. |
|---|---|---|---|---|
| 2023 | Best Actor – Female | 19(1)(a) | Nominated | |

== Filmfare Awards South ==
Menen has won four Filmfare Awards South from fifteen nominations.

| Year | Category | Film | Result | Ref. |
|---|---|---|---|---|
| 2010 | Best Supporting Actress – Kannada | Jhossh | Nominated | |
| 2012 | Best Supporting Actress – Malayalam | Urumi | Nominated | |
| 2012 | Best Actress – Telugu | Ala Modalaindi | Nominated | |
| 2012 | Best Female Playback Singer – Telugu (for "Ammammo Ammo") | Ala Modalaindi | Nominated | |
| 2014 | Best Actress – Kannada | Myna | Nominated | |
| 2014 | Best Actress – Telugu | Gunde Jaari Gallanthayyinde | Won | |
| 2016 | Best Actress – Tamil | O Kadhal Kanmani | Nominated | |
| 2016 | Best Actress – Telugu | Malli Malli Idi Rani Roju | Nominated | |
| 2016 | Critics Best Actress – Telugu | Malli Malli Idi Rani Roju | Won | |
| 2017 | Best Supporting Actress – Tamil | 24 | Nominated | |
| 2018 | Best Supporting Actress – Tamil | Mersal | Won | |
| 2023 | Best Actress – Malayalam | 19(1)(a) | Nominated | |
| 2023 | Best Actress – Tamil | Thiruchitrambalam | Nominated | |
| 2023 | Critics Best Actress – Tamil | Thiruchitrambalam | Won | |
| 2023 | Best Actress – Telugu | Bheemla Nayak | Nominated | |

== Filmfare OTT Awards ==
Menen has received one Filmfare OTT Awards nominations.

| Year | Category | Film | Result | Ref. |
|---|---|---|---|---|
| 2020 | Best Actor in a Drama Series – Female | Breathe: Into the Shadows | Nominated | |

== Hyderabad Times Film Awards ==
Menen has won two Hyderabad Times Film Awards.

| Year | Category | Film | Result | Ref. |
|---|---|---|---|---|
| 2012 | Promising Newcomer – Female | Ala Modalaindi | Won | |
| 2013 | Best Actor – Female | Ishq | Won | |

== IIFA Utsavam ==
Menen has received three IIFA Utsavam nominations.

| Year | Category | Film | Result | Ref. |
|---|---|---|---|---|
| 2016 | Best Actress – Telugu | Malli Malli Idi Rani Roju | Nominated | |
| 2016 | Best Supporting Actress – Tamil | Kanchana 2 | Nominated | |
| 2017 | Best Supporting Actress – Telugu | Rudhramadevi | Nominated | |

== Nandi Awards ==
Menen has won two Nandi Awards.

| Year | Category | Film | Result | Ref. |
|---|---|---|---|---|
| 2011 | Best Actress | Ala Modalaindi | Won | |
| 2016 | Special Jury Award | Malli Malli Idi Rani Roju | Won | |

== National Film Awards ==
Menen has won one National Film Award.

| Year | Category | Film | Result | Ref. |
|---|---|---|---|---|
| 2024 | Best Actress | Thiruchitrambalam | Won | |

== South Indian International Movie Awards ==
Menen has won two South Indian International Movie Awards from twelve nominations.

| Year | Category | Film | Result | Ref. |
|---|---|---|---|---|
| 2012 | Best Female Debut – Telugu | Ala Modalaindi | Nominated | |
| 2012 | Best Female Playback Singer – Telugu (for "Ammammo Ammo") | Ala Modalaindi | Nominated | |
| 2013 | Rising Star of South Indian Cinema – Female | —N/a | Won | |
| 2014 | Best Actress – Telugu | Gunde Jaari Gallanthayyinde | Nominated | |
| 2016 | Best Actress – Tamil | O Kadhal Kanmani | Nominated | |
| 2016 | Best Actress Critics – Tamil | O Kadhal Kanmani | Won | |
| 2016 | Best Actress – Telugu | Malli Malli Idi Rani Roju | Nominated | |
| 2016 | Best Supporting Actress – Tamil | Kanchana 2 | Nominated | |
| 2016 | Best Supporting Actress – Telugu | Rudramadevi | Nominated | |
| 2018 | Best Actress – Tamil | Mersal | Nominated | |
| 2023 | Best Actress – Tamil | Thiruchitrambalam | Nominated | |
| 2023 | Best Actress – Telugu | Bheemla Nayak | Nominated | |

== Vanitha Film Awards ==
Menen has won one Vanitha Film Awards.

| Year | Category | Film | Result | Ref. |
|---|---|---|---|---|
| 2013 | Best Star Pair (With Dulquer Salmaan) | Ustad Hotel | Won | |

== Vijay Awards ==
Menen has received two Vijay Awards nominations.

| Year | Category | Film | Result | Ref. |
|---|---|---|---|---|
| 2012 | Best Actress | Nootrenbadhu | Nominated | |
| 2015 | Best Actress | Malini 22 Palayamkottai | Nominated | |

== Other recognitions ==
=== Media honours ===
| Year | Magazine | Category | Result | Ref. |
|---|---|---|---|---|
| 2011 | Best Telugu Actresses | Rediff.com | #3 | |
| 2012 | Best Telugu Actresses | Rediff.com | #5 | |
| 2013 | Best Telugu Actresses | Rediff.com | #1 | |
| 2015 | Best Telugu Actresses | Rediff.com | #3 | |
| 2013 | Best Kannada Actresses | Rediff.com | #1 | |
| 2015 | Best Tamil Actresses | Rediff.com | #5 | |
| 2021 | Most Influential Stars on Instagram in South cinema | Forbes India | #30 | |
| 2022 | Showstoppers – India's Top 50 Outperformers | Forbes India | — | |

=== Times of India ===
| Year | Category | Result | Ref. |
|---|---|---|---|
| 2014 | Hyderabad Times Most Desirable Woman | #19 | |
| 2015 | Hyderabad Times Most Desirable Woman | #15 | |
| 2019 | Kochi Times Most Desirable Woman | #5 | |
| 2020 | Kochi Times Most Desirable Woman | #6 | |
| 2020 | Chennai Times Most Desirable Woman | #18 | |
