= Nithya Menen =

Indian actress (born 1987)

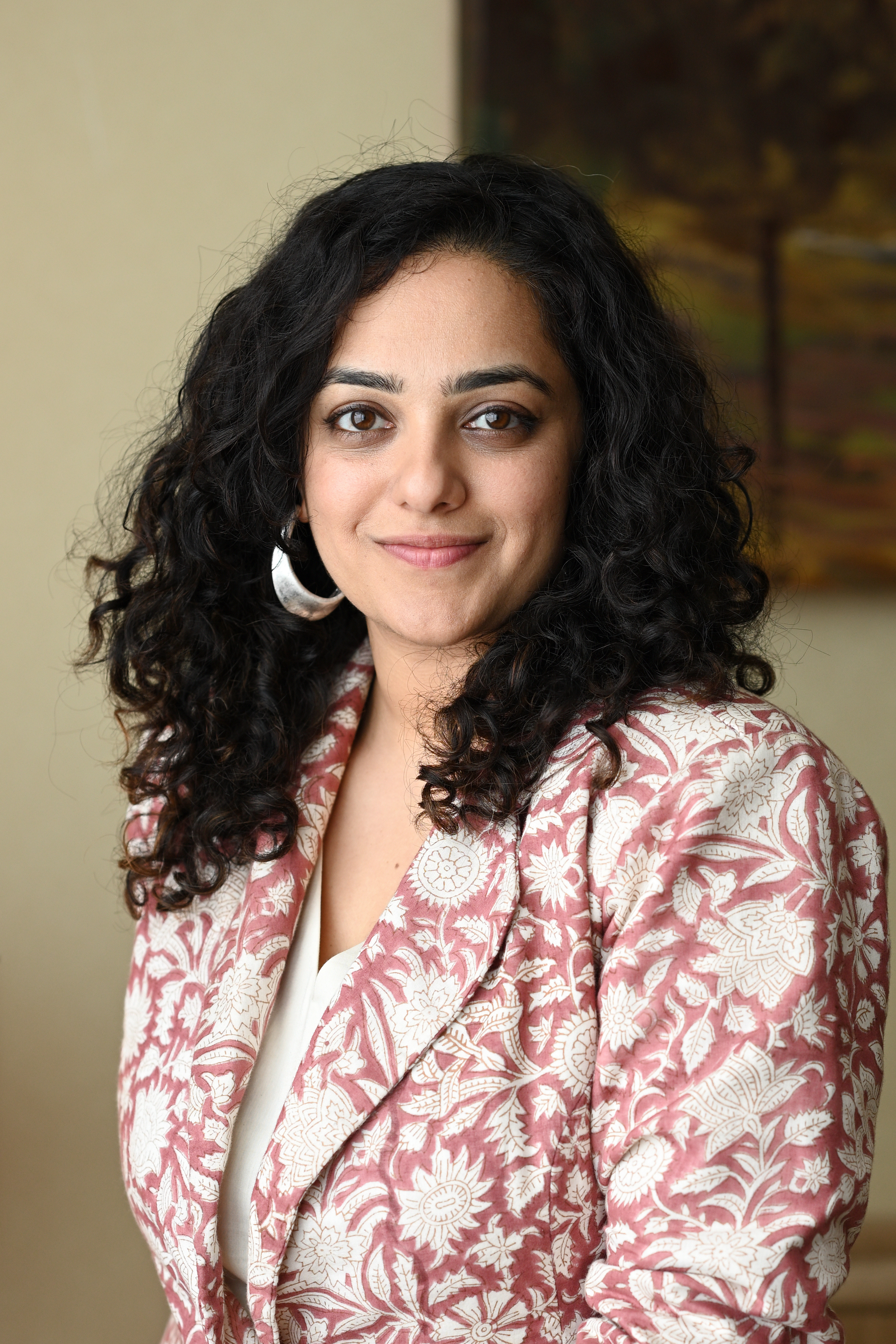
- Menen in 2023
- Born: N.S. Nithya; Bengaluru, Karnataka, India
- Other name: Nithya
- Education: Mount Carmel College; Manipal Academy of Higher Education
- Occupations: Actress; playback singer
- Years active: 1998 (child artist); 2006 ‍–‍ present
- Awards: Full list

N.S. Nithya, known professionally as Nithya Menen, is an Indian actress and singer who works predominantly in Kannada, Tamil, Malayalam and Telugu films. Having appeared in more than 50 films, she is noted for her strong portrayals. Menen is a recipient of several accolades including a National Film Award, four Filmfare Awards South and two Nandi Awards.

Menen has appeared as a child artist, in the French-Indian English film, Hanuman (1998), playing the younger sister to Tabu's character. She made her screen debut with the Kannada film 7 O' Clock (2006). The 2011 romance film Ala Modalaindi proved to be her breakthrough and won her Nandi Award for Best Actress. Menen received the Filmfare Award for Best Actress – Telugu for her portrayal in Gunde Jaari Gallanthayyinde (2013). Further success in Telugu films came with Ishq (2012), Malli Malli Idi Rani Roju (2015), which won her the Filmfare Critics Best Actress – Telugu, Rudhramadevi (2015), Janatha Garage (2016), Awe (2018) and Bheemla Nayak (2022).

Menen established herself as a leading South Indian actress with the Tamil romantic film O Kadhal Kanmani (2015). She went on to appear in such commercially successful films — the Malayalam films Ustad Hotel (2012), Bangalore Days (2014) and 100 Days of Love (2015), and the Tamil films Kanchana 2 (2015), 24 (2016), Mersal (2017), Thiruchitrambalam (2022) and Thalaivan Thalaivii (2025). Mersal earned her Filmfare Best Supporting Actress – Tamil, while Thiruchitrambalam earned her Filmfare Critics Best Actress – Tamil and National Film Award for Best Actress. Menen ventured into Hindi films with the science drama Mission Mangal (2019), which remains her highest-grossing release.

== Early life ==
Nithya Menen was born in Bangalore, Karnataka, to Sukumar and Nalini. Her grandparents were Malayalis from Kerala who had settled in Bangalore. She was educated at Poorna Prajna School in Bangalore and at Mount Carmel College, Bangalore. She then completed her degree in journalism from the Manipal Academy of Higher Education.

Menen has said that she initially wished to become a pilot but ultimately found aviation unappealing, so she pivoted to filmmaking. This led her to enroll in the Film and Television Institute of India, Pune, to study cinematography. While there, she met B. V. Nandini Reddy, who convinced her to take up acting. Menen is a polyglot and can speak six languages: Malayalam, Kannada, Telugu, Tamil, Hindi, and English. She claims she made up the surname "Menen" as she felt it "helps with her passport during travel".

== Career ==
=== Career beginnings and early work (2006-2010) ===
In 1998, Menen appeared first on-screen as a child in a French-Indian English film named Hanuman, playing younger sister to Tabu's character. She also was a part of the Hindi-language soap opera Choti Maa – Ek Anokha Bandhan, in one episode, which was aired during 2001-2002 .

In 2006, she debuted in Kannada by playing a supporting role in the film 7 O' Clock. The 2008 off-beat film Aakasha Gopuram, directed by K. P. Kumaran, marked her film career in a leading role in Malayalam, in which she was paired with Mohanlal. She was in the midst of her 12th class exams when she was offered the role, after Mohanlal had spotted her on the front cover of a tourism magazine, Stark World Kerala. Her performance was well received, with critics writing that she shows "sparkle in her debut venture" and "makes her entry in an impressive role", though the film was a financial failure.

She next made a comeback into Kannada films with the film Jhossh, in 2009. The film received rave reviews, and became a commercial success as well, with her performance garnering her a nomination in the Best Supporting Actress category at the 57th Filmfare Awards South. The same year she appeared in Vellathooval, Angel John and Kerala Cafe. She received positive reviews for the lattermost. In 2010, she starred in the Malayalam films, Anwar and Apoorvaragam where she plays Nancy, a young girl who gets involved with two male students (Nishan and Asif Ali) who are later discovered to be con-artists. The film received mixed to negative reviews, but became a hit at the box office.

=== Breakthrough and commercial success (2011–2014) ===
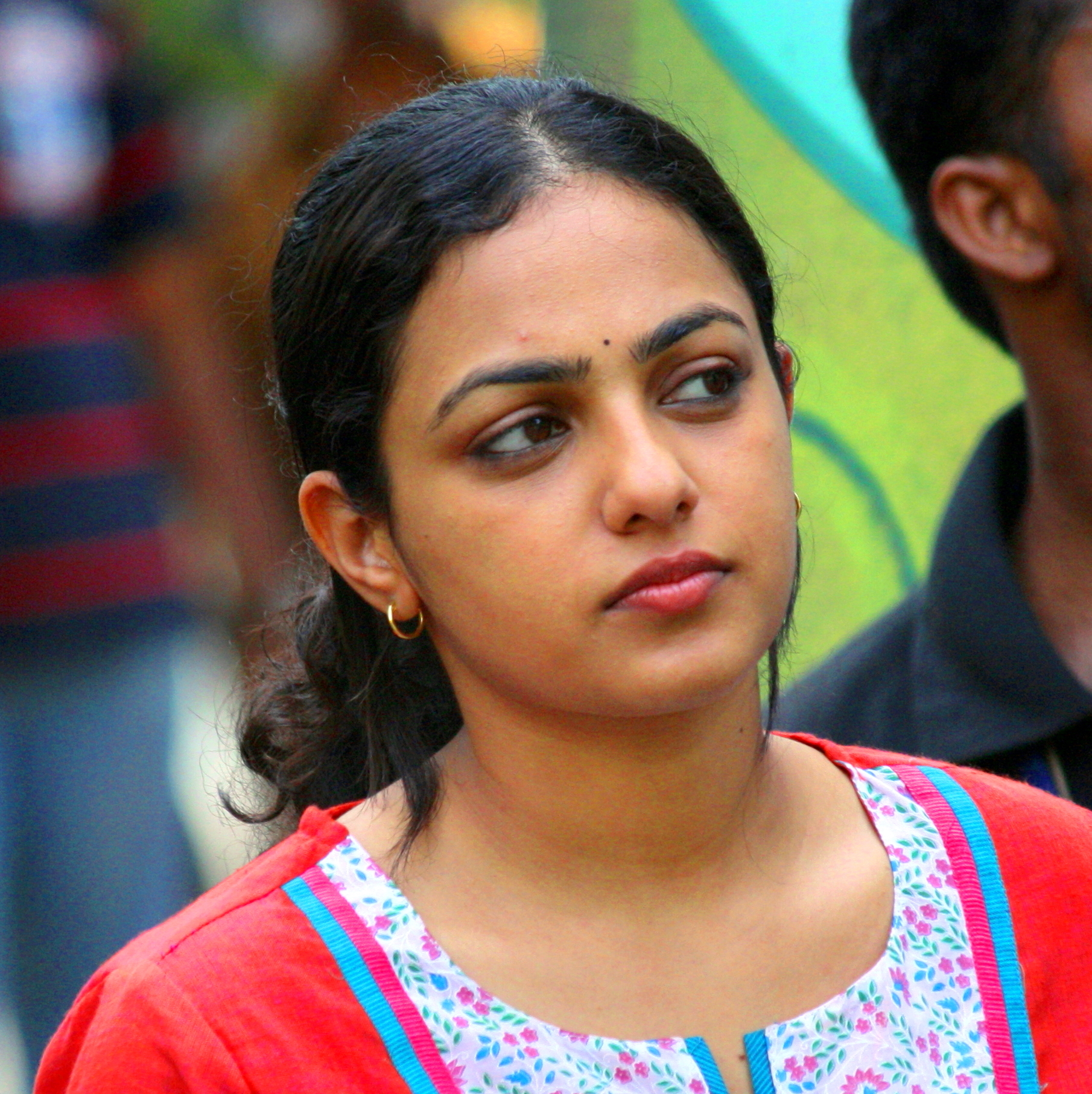
Menen in 2011

Menen's career marked a turning point in 2011, with the romantic comedy Ala Modalaindi, which was her maiden Telugu venture. The film opened to favourable reviews by critics and turned out to become a sleeper hit, while Menen received critical praise for her performance. Idlebrain's Jeevi in his review cited that she "epitomized Nitya character with her fabulous performance", "looks beautiful in all kinds of dresses" and was "the best debut in recent years of Telugu cinema after Samantha in YMC", while another critic wrote that she was a "charming find" and "...quite the Genelia replacement that our cinema so badly needs right now." She eventually won the Nandi Award for Best Actress for her performance and received a nomination for Filmfare Award for Best Actress. Further more, she also sang two songs for the soundtrack album of the film, tuned by Kalyan Malik. Nandini Reddy, later, went on to describe Menen as "the discovery of the decade".

Following Ala Modalaindi, she starred in Santosh Sivan's historical fiction Urumi as part of an ensemble cast. She portrayed a Chirakkal princess named Bala, playing the love interest of Prabhu Deva's character, which gained positive remarks, with a Sify review claiming that she "looks pretty and is a scene stealer". Menen quoted that much of her character was based on "Santosh's perception of who I am", with Sivan stating that he had written that role for her and that only she could play it. She received a nomination for Filmfare Award for Best Supporting Actress at the 59th Filmfare Awards South She next appeared in ad-filmmaker Jayendra's bilingual venture Nootrenbadhu, which was made and released in Tamil and Telugu (as 180), in which she played a photo journalist named Vidya. She described the character as "bubbly, full of life, nosey, wide-eyed and innocent in life" and to be similar to herself. Later the year, she was seen in Sibi Malayil's Violin in Malayalam and the Gautham Vasudev Menon-produced Veppam in Tamil. She also featured in V. K. Prakash's Kannada anthology film Aidondla Aidu where she played a young bride who is obsessed with making payasam for her new husband much to his chagrin. She had sung and also choreographed one of the songs, titled "Payasa".

Menen's first 2012 release was the Telugu romance film Ishq with Nithiin. She received the CineMAA Award for Best Actress - Critics, for this film which was a commercial success News18 praised her portrayal and her chemistry with Nithin. She was later seen in five Malayalam films: Karmayogi, V. K. Prakash's Malayalam adaptation of Shakespeare's Hamlet co-starring Indrajith Sukumaran, Poppins, the Malayalam remake of Aidondla Aidu in which she reprised her role from the original and sang the Malayalam version of "Payasa", T. K. Rajeev Kumar's Thalsamayam Oru Penkutty, in which she portrayed a village woman whose daily life is filmed and broadcast as a reality show for a month, Amal Neerad's Bachelor Party in which she played Asif Ali's wife and young mother to their baby and Ustad Hotel directed by Anwar Rasheed where she paired up for the first time with Dulquer Salmaan. In Ustad Hotel, she played a headstrong girl, who gets in a forced marriage. Rediff.com stated, "Nithiya gets a meaty role as her character is well etched." Most of these films became a major commercial success, solidifying Menen's career.

In 2013, Menen starred in three Telugu and one Kannada film. She first appeared in Okkadine with Nara Rohit and in Jabardasth with Siddharth and Samantha. Menen received praises for playing the titular role of a physically challenged girl in Myna. The film was successful and completed 100 days in many centers across Karnataka. Her performance was well praised by the critics. She also sang the female version of "Modele Maleyante" which was well received. Menen won rave reviews and her first Filmfare Award for Best Actress – Telugu for playing a character with two shades in Gunde Jaari Gallanthayyinde opposite Nithin, her last release that year. It was a huge box office success. Times of India noted, "Nithya Menen takes the honors as far as acting goes. She has the author backed role and overshadows everyone else".

In her first film of 2014, she played the lead role of a nursing student and rape victim in Malini 22 Palayamkottai, a remake of 22 Female Kottayam. The New Indian Express critic stated, "Nithya, a consummate actor otherwise, has this air of confidence throughout, and is dressed smartly too." Menen then played a cameo in the Malayalam film Bangalore Days opposite Fahadh Faasil. Sify wrote, "Nithya Menen has a limited role to play, but she suit her role perfectly." The film became one of the highest grossing Malayalam films of all time.

=== Established actress (2015–2019) ===
Menen starred in numerous films which gave her more critical and commercial recognition, in 2015. In her first film of the year, she appeared opposite Sharwanand for, Malli Malli Idi Rani Roju. She played a young Muslim student in love with a Hindu. She won the Filmfare Critics Award for Best Actress – Telugu and Nandi Special Jury Award, for her performance. With this Menen became the first Telugu actress ever to win Critics Award & the Best Actress Award at Filmfare. News18 noted, "Nithya changed looks and body language in each stage is impressive. She starts as a girl and ends as a woman. Her performance is worth commending." She then appeared in JK Enum Nanbanin Vaazhkai and S/O Satyamurthy directed by Trivikram Srinivas. Menen then played opposite Dulquer Salmaan in 100 Days of Love. The New Indian Express said she gave a "decent performance". All the three films were box office success.

Menen achieved further acclaim with three more films in 2015. She played a crippled girl alongside Raghava Lawrence in his directorial Kanchana 2, a successful film. The critics termed her performance "crucial" and "effective". Menen received immense praises for the a romantic film O Kadhal Kanmani, directed by Mani Ratnam. She played an architectural student Tara, opposite Dulquer Salmaan. Dulquer and Menen's on-screen chemistry was praised and she garnered her first Filmfare Award for Best Actress – Tamil nomination. The film became a financial success at the box office. Firstpost noted, " Menen is an exceptional actor and has delivered a very realistic performance." It further praised her chemistry with Salmaan and added, "They're perfect as the couple and the credit goes to the director for capturing the chemistry between them in simple ways." She played princess Muktamba in Rudhramadevi with Anushka Shetty, her final film of the year. The Hindu stated, "Nithya Menen shows that she can leave an imprint on any character she plays. She is an endearing addition to this film."

By 2016, Menen established herself as a leading actress. She starred in three Tamil films in 2016. Beginning the year was 24 where she was paired opposite Suriya for the first time. The film was opened to high critical acclaim, Deccan Chronicle wrote, "Nithya Menen shines in her role." Her screen presence and garnered her a Filmfare Award for Best Supporting Actress – Tamil nomination. She played the main heroine in K. S. Ravikumar's bilingual project titled Kotigobba 2 opposite Sudeep. Towards the end of the year, she starred alongside Vikram in science-fiction thriller Iru Mugan and received praises for her limited role. In Telugu, she starred in two films, Okka Ammayi Thappa opposite Sundeep Kishan and Janatha Garage opposite Jr. NTR. All of her films proved commercial success.

Her only release in 2017 was the Tamil film Mersal opposite Vijay, where she was praised for her role as a tough yet supportive wife, Firstpost noted, "Among the three actresses, it is Nithya Menen who makes an impression with her competent performance." The film garnered her a Filmfare Award for Best Supporting Actress – Tamil at 65th Filmfare Awards South and was a huge box office success. She had two Telugu films in 2018. Menen played a lesbian psychiatrist in Awe, that received highly positive reviews. She became the first mainstream South Indian actress to play an LGBTQ character. The Hindu stated that Menen "shine through", giving her all to character that "don't come by often". She next had a cameo in Geetha Govindam.

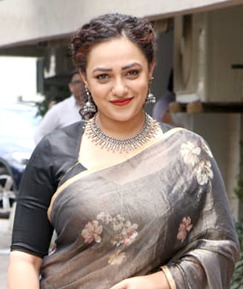
Menen at Mission Mangal trailer launch

Menen played actress Savitri in her first film of 2019, NTR: Kathanayakudu. She reunited with V. K. Prakash in the experimental film Praana which also marks her comeback to Malayalam industry after 2015. She played an English writer who battles intolerance in society and is the sole actor in the film. The News Minute praised the actor and said, "Nithya displays the right emotions as Thara. Remember it's just her, and one person makes so much of an impact. Nithya carries it off all so effortlessly." Menen made her Hindi film debut with the highly successful film Mission Mangal, playing a satellite engineer. Bollywood Hungama noted that Menen has a smaller role but "it serves as a great debut". NDTV said that as the staid and steady Varsha Pillai, Nithya Menen is "delightfully good".

=== Continued success and critical acclaim (2020–2023) ===
In 2020, Menen starred alongside Udhayanidhi Stalin in Mysskin's Psycho, where she played Kamala Das, a foul-mouthed quadriplegic ex-police officer. The same year, she made her OTT debut in the Amazon Prime series Breathe: Into the Shadows alongside Abhishek Bachchan and Amit Sadh, for which she received her first nomination for Best Actor (Female) in a Drama Series at the Filmfare OTT Awards.

Menen starred in three Telugu films in 2021. She played a spirit named Maya in Ninnila Ninnila with Ashok Selvan and Ritu Varma. Firstpost wrote, "The big surprise in the film is Nithya whose impishness in the story is unlike anything else that she has portrayed over the years, and her on-screen chemistry with Selvan is a delight." Her next film Skylab, marked her first film as a producer. She played a singer in her year's final film Gamanam.

Menen had four film and two web releases in 2022. She starred in Bheemla Nayak opposite Pawan Kalyan and Rana Daggubati, the film was a box office success. Ram Venkat Srikar stated, "Nithya's Suguna, surprisingly gets a few memorable moments, and she brings a certain level of warmness to Bheemla whenever she is on screen." She appeared in the series Modern Love Hyderabad, where Saibal Chatterjee termed her performance "luminous". Next, she played an unnamed lady in 19(1)(a) alongside Vijay Sethupathi. In an interview, Menen termed it her career-best performance, alongside OK Kanmani. Following this, Menen reprised her role in the second season of Breathe: Into the Shadows, opposite Abhishek Bachchan.

Menen received rave reviews for the romantic drama Thiruchitrambalam opposite Dhanush, where she played his childhood friend Shobana. It became a critical and commercial success, and the highest grossing Tamil film of the year. Haricharan Pudipeddi noted, "Nithya has always shied away from playing the quintessential heroine. She's phenomenal in the film, playing a key character that she nails to perfection." Janani K stated, "If you give Nithya a meaty character, everyone else can sit back and admire her living the role with full of zest." Her performance won her the National Film Award for Best Actress (tied with Mansi Parekh for Kutch Express) and Filmfare Critics Award for Best Actress – Tamil. Menen then played a pregnant women in her final film of the year, Wonder Women. Wonder Woman was filmed before Thiruchitrambalam.

In 2023, Menen appeared in Kolaambi, her first film of 2023, which she termed among her "all time favourite". Kolambi was screened at the 50th International Film Festival of India in Goa (2019). Later that year, Menen played the lead in two more series. First she played a restaurant worker in Kumari Srimathi, with Vinamra Mathur calling her performance "lively, spunky and vibrant". Masterpeace was her last release that year, where she played a girl in a modern relationship. Sajin Shriijth of Cinema Express termed her work "decent".

=== Career progression (2024–present) ===
With no release in 2024, Menen started 2025 with Kadhalikka Neramillai, where she played an architect and single mother opposite Ravi Mohan. Avinash Ramachandran called her "terrific" and added, "Menen is at the centre of the narrative. She is excellent as a woman who wants to live life on her own terms." It emerged a moderate success. Menen next played a wife in a troubled marriage opposite Vijay Sethupathi in Thalaivan Thalaivii. Vishal Menon from The Hollywood Reporter India was appreciative of her delightful chemistry with Sethupathi and added, "Arasi is played wonderfully by in-sync actor Menen. We finally get to see Sethupathi being matched in performance by an equal." The film emerged a commercial success and one of the highest grossing Tamil film of the year. Her final release of the year came with Idli Kadai, where she reunited with Dhanush. Arjun Menon felt she was "cast well" as the funny, caring love interest and found her scenes with Dhanush "delightful". The film underperformed commercially.

Menen will next appear in Masoom 2 opposite Manoj Bajpayee.

== Artistry and public image ==
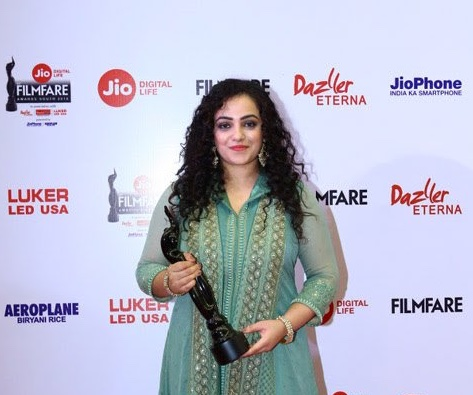
Menen at Filmfare awards

Ankur Pathak of HuffPost stated that Menen's filmography is "filled with experiments" and noted, "The actor has taken risks throughout her career. Menen has ensured that she's unforgettable even in cameos." Sangeetha Devi Dundoo of The Hindu said that she had "shown a natural flair for acting" and noted that she had worked in a variety of genres from breezy romance to period drama to out-of-the-box projects. Latha Srinivasan of The New Indian Express noted, "Nithya Menen slips into her character's skin with effortless ease." Nibandh Vinod of News18 termed her an "accomplished actress and singer" who had established a career in five industries.

Often compared to late actress Soundarya, Menen takes it as a compliment. "Since Soundarya, perhaps there hasn't been anyone that people could relate to. She was loved and respected," she says. Menen is known as someone who is a very private person. Hemanth Kumar of Firstpost said, "There's always been an air of mystery about Nithya Menen, and when she talks, she's careful about how she articulates her thoughts and ideas. Despite her popularity, the actress is hardly in news." In Hyderabad Times Most Desirable Woman list, she was placed 19th in 2014 and 15th in 2015. She was further placed 5th in 2019 and 6th in 2020 in Kochi Times' Most Desirable Woman list. In the Chennai Times Most Desirable Woman list, Menen was placed 25th in 2017 and 18th in 2020.

Menen is widely known for her performances in films such as – Kerala Cafe, Ala Modalaindi, 180, Ishq, Ustad Hotel, Malli Malli Idi Raani Roju, O Kadhal Kanmani, Mersal, Awe, and Thiruchitrambalam among others. Menen has appeared in Rediff.com's "Top Telugu Actresses" four times. She was placed 3rd in 2011, 5th in 2012, 1st in 2013 and 3rd in 2015. In its "Top Kannada Actresses", she ranked 1st in 2013 and in "Top Tamil Actresses" list, she ranked 5th in 2015. Her performance in O Kadhal Kanmani is regarded as one of the "100 Greatest Performances of the Decade" by Film Companion. Menen's portrayal of Tara and Kamala are considered among the most memorable female characters of Tamil cinema. In 2022, Forbes India included her in its first ever "Showstoppers – India's Top 50 Outperformers" list. Menen stood at the 30th place on its most influential stars on Instagram in South cinema for the year 2021 list.

== Filmography ==
Key
†	Denotes films that have not yet been released

=== Films ===
List of Nithya Menen film credits
Year	Title	Role	Language	Notes	Ref.
1998	Hanuman	Moona	English	credited as Nitiya Sukumaran; Child artist	
2006	7 O' Clock	Anu	Kannada	credited as Nithya; Supporting role	
2008	Aakasha Gopuram	Hilda Varghese	Malayalam	credited as Nithya; Debut in Lead Role	
2009	Jhossh	Meera	Kannada	credited as Nithya	
2009	Vellathooval	Jiya George	Malayalam	credited as Nithya	
2009	Kerala Cafe	Nithya	Malayalam	credited as Nithya	
2009	Angel John	Sofia	Malayalam		
2010	Apoorvaragam	Nancy	Malayalam		
2010	Anwar	Asna	Malayalam		
2011	Ala Modalaindi	Nithya	Telugu	Telugu debut	
2011	Urumi	Chirakkal Bala / Daisy da Cunha (Note: Nithya Menen played a single character with two or more names.)	Malayalam		
2011	180	D. Vidya Lakshmi	Telugu	Bilingual film	
2011	Nootrenbadhu	D. Vidya Lakshmi	Tamil	Bilingual film	
2011	Violin	Angel	Malayalam		
2011	Veppam	Revathy	Tamil		
2011	Aidondla Aidu	Gowri	Kannada	Segment: "Payasa"	
2011	Makaramanju	Malayali Penkutty	Malayalam		
2012	Ishq	Priya	Telugu		
2012	Thalsamayam Oru Penkutty	Manjula Ayyapan	Malayalam		
2012	Karmayogi	Moonumani	Malayalam		
2012	Doctor Innocentanu	Anna	Malayalam	Special appearance	
2012	Bachelor Party	Neethu	Malayalam		
2012	Ustad Hotel	Shahana Faizal	Malayalam		
2012	Poppins	Ammu	Malayalam	Anthology film	
2013	Okkadine	Shailaja	Telugu		
2013	Jabardasth	Saraswati	Telugu		
2013	Myna	Myna	Kannada		
2013	Gunde Jaari Gallanthayyinde	Shravani / Bangaram	Telugu		
2014	Malini 22 Palayamkottai	Malini	Tamil		
2014	Bangalore Days	Natasha Francis	Malayalam	Cameo appearance	
2015	Malli Malli Idi Rani Roju	Nazeera Khanum	Telugu		
2015	JK Enum Nanbanin Vaazhkai	Nithya	Tamil		
2015	100 Days of Love	Sheela	Malayalam		
2015	S/O Satyamurthy	Valli	Telugu		
2015	Kanchana 2	Ganga	Tamil		
2015	O Kadhal Kanmani	Tara Kalingarayar	Tamil		
2015	Rudhramadevi	Muktamba	Telugu		
2016	24	Priya Sethuraman	Tamil		
2016	Okka Ammayi Thappa	Mango / Satyabhama	Telugu		
2016	Kotigobba 2	Subhashini / Shubha	Kannada	Bilingual film	
2016	Mudinja Ivana Pudi	Subhashini / Shubha	Tamil	Bilingual film	
2016	Janatha Garage	Anu	Telugu		
2016	Iru Mugan	Ayushi	Tamil		
2016	Ghatana	Malini	Telugu		
2017	Mersal	Aishwarya Vetrimaaran	Tamil		
2018	Awe	Krishnaveni	Telugu		
2018	Geetha Govindam	Nithya	Telugu	Special appearance	
2019	NTR: Kathanayakudu	Savitri	Telugu	Special appearance	
2019	Praana	Tara Anuradha	Malayalam		
2019	Mission Mangal	Varsha Pillai	Hindi		
2020	Psycho	Kamala Das IPS	Tamil		
2021	Ninnila Ninnila	Maya	Telugu		
2021	Gamanam	Shailaputri Devi	Telugu	Cameo appearance	
2021	Skylab	Gouri Venkataraju	Telugu	Also producer	
2022	Bheemla Nayak	Suguna Nayak	Telugu		
2022	19(1)(a)	Unnamed Cafe Runner	Malayalam		
2022	Thiruchitrambalam	Shobana	Tamil		
2022	Wonder Women	Nora Joseph	English		
2023	Kolaambi	Arundhathi	Malayalam		
2025	Kadhalikka Neramillai	Shreya Chandramohan	Tamil		
2025	Thalaivan Thalaivii	Perarasi "Arasi"	Tamil		
2025	Idli Kadai	Kayal	Tamil		
2026	Mr & Mrs Grey †	Mrs Grey	Hindi	Completed	

=== Television ===
List of Nithya Menen television credits
Year	Title	Role	Language	Notes	Ref.
2001–2002	Chhoti Maa...Ek Anokha Bandhan	Young Koyna	Hindi	Child artist	
2022	Telugu Indian Idol	Judge	Telugu		
2020–2022	Breathe: Into the Shadows	Abha Sabarwal	Hindi	2 seasons	
2022	Modern Love Hyderabad	Noori Hussain	Telugu	Segment: "My Unlikely Pandemic Dream Partner"	
2023	Kumari Srimathi	Itikelapudi Srimathi	Telugu		
2023	Masterpeace	Riya Kurian	Malayalam		

=== Voice artist ===
List of Nithya Menen film voice artist credits
Year	Title	Role	Language	Notes
2013	Gunde Jaari Gallanthayyinde	Shruti	Telugu	
2019	Frozen 2	Elsa	Telugu	

== Discography ==
List of Nithya Menen musical credits
Year	Song	Film/Album	Language	Composer	Ref.
2010	"Payasa"	Aidondla Aidu	Kannada	Abhijit-Joe	
2011	"Edo Anukunte"	Ala Modalaindi	Telugu	Kalyani Malik	
2011	"Ammammo Ammo"	Ala Modalaindi	Telugu	Kalyani Malik	
2012	"Oh Priya Priya"	Ishq	Telugu	Anoop Rubens	
2012	"Payasam"	Poppins	Malayalam	Ratheesh Vegha	
2013	"Arere Arere"	Jabardasth	Telugu	S. Thaman	
2013	"Doore Doore Neengi"	Natholi Oru Cheria Meenalla	Malayalam	Abhijith	
2013	"Modala Maleyante"	Myna	Kannada	Jassie Gift	
2013	"O Premada Poojari"	Myna	Kannada	Jassie Gift	
2013	"Thu Hi Rey"	Gunde Jaari Gallanthayyinde	Telugu	Anoop Rubens	
2013	"Hi My Name is Malini"	Malini 22 Palayamkottai	Tamil	Arvind & Shankar	
2013	"Kanneer Thulilye (Duet)"	Malini 22 Palayamkottai	Tamil	Arvind & Shankar	
2013	"Madharthamma (Immigrant Mix)"	Malini 22 Palayamkottai	Tamil	Arvind & Shankar	
2013	"Hi My Name is Malini"	Ghatana	Telugu	Arvind & Shankar	
2013	"Navve Kaluva (Duet)"	Ghatana	Telugu	Arvind & Shankar	
2013	"Yennali (Immigrant Mix)"	Ghatana	Telugu	Arvind & Shankar	
2015	"Paalnilaa: Lets Do the Dandiya"	Rockstar	Malayalam	Prashant Pillai	
2016	"Laalijo"	24	Telugu	A. R. Rahman	
2016	"Hrudayam Kannulatho"	100 Days of Love	Telugu	Govind Menon	
2018	"Va Va Vo"	Mohanlal	Malayalam	Tony Joseph Pallivathukal	
2021	"Thiruppavai"	Margazhi Thingal	Tamil	Ravi G	
2022	"Thaniye"	—N/a	Malayalam	Sidharth Menon	
2022	"Thanha"	—N/a	Hindi	Sidharth Menon	

== Accolades ==
Menen won the National Film Award for Best Actress for her performance in Thiruchitrambalam. She has also won four Filmfare Awards — Best Actress – Telugu for Gunde Jaari Gallanthayyinde, Critics Best Actress – Telugu for Malli Malli Idi Rani Roju, Best Supporting Actress – Tamil for Mersal and Critics Best Actress – Tamil for Thiruchitrambalam. She also won two Nandi Awards: Best Actress for Ala Modalaindi and Special Jury Award for Malli Malli Idi Rani Roju.
