= Shanker Ramakrishnan =

Indian filmmaker

- Occupations: Film director; Actor; Scriptwriter
- Spouse: Shruthi Udayakumar
- Children: 2

Shanker Ramakrishnan is an Indian film screenwriter, director, producer and actor, who works primarily in Malayalam cinema.

== Career ==
He is a law graduate (LL.B) from Government Law College, Thiruvananthapuram and he started his career immediately after completing post-graduation from the School of Management Studies, CUSAT.

In the collective film Kerala Café, Shankar scripted and directed the critically acclaimed film segment "Island Express". Prithviraj who played the lead character “Leon” in the film invited Shankar to write August Cinema's maiden venture “Urumi”. Urumi was a historical drama film directed and filmed by Santosh Sivan with Prithviraj and Genelia in the lead roles. The movie created a turning point in Shankar's artistic career and gave him opportunities to work on the wider canvas.

V. K. Prakash, the National Award winner, invited Shankar to write the Malayalam version of the Hindi film "Freaky Chakra". The Malayalam version was titled "Netholi oru Cheriya Meen Alla" and was a postmodern experimental film starring Fahadh Faasil and Kamalinee Mukherjee.

Shankar's filmography took a surprise detour when Ranjith offered him a role to play Alexey Thadeus, the free-spirited cancer patient, in his movie “Spirit”. The role won Shankar the 'SIIMA Award for Best Male Debutant' and best supporting actor awards including the ‘Mathrubhumi Medimix Movie Award’. Spirit was followed by V.K.P's “Poppins” and G.S. Vijayan's “Bavuttiyude Namathil” starring Mammootty and written by Ranjith.

Shankar then went on to play vivid characters in movies like "Seconds", Sreebala K. Menon's “Love 24X7” with Dileep, and Bobby-Sanjay's "How Old Are You" with Manju Warrier, directed by Roshan Andrews.

He took a break from acting and began working on the mega project "Kunjali Marikkar IV"" originally written by T. P. Rajeevan. The movie was initially expected to hit screens by end of 2018; however the film was indefinitely postponed owing to prior commitments of the crew. Shankar has also completed the scripting of "My Story", which will have Prithviraj and Parvathy playing the lead roles.

Shankar recently announced his directorial debut with Pathinettam Padi to be produced by August Cinema. The video casting call for the new movie was hosted by actor Nivin Pauly on 17 August 2017, which went viral in the social media. On 2 October 2017, actor Mohanlal unveiled the title art of the movie.

== Filmography ==
Key
†	Denotes films that have not yet been released

- All films are in Malayalam language unless otherwise noted.

=== As actor ===
Year	Title	Role	Notes
2012	Spirit	Alexy	Nominated, SIIMA Award for Best Male Debutant
2012	Poppins	Hari	
2012	Bavuttiyude Namathil	Sethu	
2013	Silence	Schoolbus Driver	
2013	Nadan	Anand	
2014	Peruchazhi	Andy/ Sachidhanandhan	
2014	How Old Are You	Minister	
2014	Seconds	Mahadev	
2014	Ottamandaram	Vinayan	
2014	Ente Sathyanweshana Pareekshakal	Majeed Abu	
2015	Nirnnayakam	Dr. Prakash Mathew	
2015	Love 24x7	Murali Gopalakrishna Pillai	
2015	Loham	Gangster AliKhan	
2016	White	Anwar	
2018	Ira	Jacob Chandi	
2018	Painting Life	Nassar	
2021	One	N. Shamsudeen	
2021	Kaaval	K.P. Varghese	
2022	Meppadiyan	Doctor	
2022	Pada	Officer	
2022	Twenty One Gms	Shihab Muhammad	
2022	Padma	Tony Nambadan	
2022	Varaal	A.P. Ananthakrishnan	
2022	Headmaster		
2022	Kotthu	Prathap	
2023	Thaaram Theertha Koodaram	Reghunath	
2024	Thalavan	SP Hemanth Ram IPS	
2026	I, Nobody	Superintendent of Police	
2026	Law and Order	CM Rajendran	

=== As scriptwriter ===
Year	Film	Director	Notes
2009	Kerala Cafe	Himself	Segment: Island Express
2011	Urumi	Santosh Sivan	
2013	Natholi Oru Cheriya Meenalla	V. K. Prakash	
2014	Ente Sathyanweshana Pareekshakal	Subil Surendran	Delayed-Screenplay
2017	My Story	Roshni Dinaker	
2019	Mamangam	M Padmakumar	
2023	Rani: The Real Story	Himself	

=== As director ===
Year	Film	Notes
2009	Kerala Cafe	Segment: Island Express
2019	Pathinettam Padi	
2023	Rani: The Real Story	

Television

Year	Title	Role	Channel	Notes
2016 October – 2017	Rahasya Sancharangal	Host	Asianet Plus	Television Debut
