= Thalaivan Thalaivii =

2025 Indian Tamil film by Pandiraaj

- Theatrical release poster
- Directed by: Pandiraaj
- Written by: Pandiraaj
- Produced by: Sendhil Thyagarajan; Arjun Thyagarajan; TG Thyagarajan (presenter)
- Starring: Vijay Sethupathi; Nithya Menen
- Cinematography: M. Sukumar
- Edited by: Pradeep E. Ragav
- Music by: Santhosh Narayanan
- Production company: Sathya Jyothi Films
- Release date: 25 July 2025
- Running time: 141 minutes
- Country: India
- Language: Tamil
- Budget: est. ₹25 crore
- Box office: est. ₹110 crore

Thalaivan Thalaivii (transl. Hero, Heroine) is a 2025 Indian Tamil-language romantic action comedy film written and directed by Pandiraaj. Produced by Sathya Jyothi Films, the film stars Vijay Sethupathi and Nithya Menen in the lead roles.

The film was officially announced in August 2024 under the tentative title VJS52, as it is Sethupathi's 52nd film as a lead actor, and the official title was announced in May 2025. Principal photography took place from August 2024 to February 2025 in Chennai and Tiruchirappalli. The film has music composed by Santhosh Narayanan, cinematography handled by M. Sukumar and editing by Pradeep E. Ragav.

Thalaivan Thalaivii was released in theatres on 25 July 2025. The film opened to mixed reviews from critics, who praised the lead performances of Vijay Sethupathi and Nithya Menen, the natural humour, its family-friendly appeal, and a well-crafted first half. However, it faced criticism for a repetitive and overemotional second half, excessive loudness, constant yelling between characters, and a disjointed screenplay. Despite the polarising critical reception, the film emerged as a commercial success.

== Plot ==
Aagasaveeran runs a roadside eatery with his family. He's engaged to Arasi "Perarasi", a double degree graduate, and both families have agreed to the union. Perarasi develops feelings for Aagasaveeran due to their shared passion for cuisine. However, her brother Porchelvan discovers Aagasaveeran's family has been involved in rowdyism in the past. This, combined with Aagasaveeran's lack of graduation, contrary to his mother Pottu's claims, leads Perarasi's family to call off the marriage. Aagasaveeran's father, Sembaiyya, meets Perarasi's father, Arasaangam, and Porchelvan, and assures them that his family now leads a peaceful life. Despite this, Perarasi's family remains resistant to the union. On Diwali eve, Aagasaveeran visits Perarasi's house to inquire about the marriage. Despite resistance from Perarasi's family and an attack by Porchelvan's henchmen, Aagasaveeran takes Perarasi with him and marries her in the presence of his family. Perarasi's family cuts ties with her, but months later, Arasaangam forgives her, and the family reunites.

Three months into her marriage, Perarasi starts to bond with her in-laws. Sembaiyya gives her a symbol of authority by making her sit at the cash counter of their hotel, a position previously held by Pottu, thereby making her feel humiliated. As the eatery expands into a hotel, it's renamed "Perarasi Hotel," which sparks envy in Ragavarthini, Aagasaveeran's sister. In retaliation, she takes over the cash counter, demoting Perarasi to serving as a waitress and performing table-cleaning duties. Despite this, Perarasi continues to work hard out of love for Aagasaveeran. Pottu further burdens Perarasi with various tasks, including washing vessels, cooking, and serving. Aagasaveeran, unable to confront his family, motivates Perarasi to persevere and helps her with the workload. Meanwhile, Perarasi's mother, Aavarnam, begins to manipulate Perarasi into separating from her in-laws, believing that a separate life would bring happiness to the couple. This leads to frequent verbal arguments between the couple, and Perarasi frequently returns to her parents' home. Each time, Aagasaveeran pleads with her to come back, and she forgives him, believing his mother and sister are the root of the problem.

As time passes, Perarasi becomes pregnant, and Aagasaveeran lavishly spends on her baby shower function. However, Perarasi soon discovers that Pottu is secretly planning his marriage to his cousin, Azhagi, without his knowledge. Perarasi informs her brother Porchelvan about this, and tensions rise between Perarasi, Ragavarthini, and Pottu. Perarasi's doubts about Aagasaveeran's relationship with Azhagi lead to a violent outburst from Aagasaveeran, and in a fit of rage, he attempts to commit suicide by jumping into a well but is rescued after several hours. Meanwhile, Porchelvan and his men arrive at Aagasaveeran's house, brutally beat his family, and take Perarasi and their toddler away. Aagasaveeran tries to avenge, but Porchelvan escapes and uses his acquaintance, Inspector Chithra Krishnan, to file a fake complaint against Aagasaveeran's family for abusing Perarasi. With Chithra Krishnan's support, Porchelvan permanently separates Perarasi and Aagasaveeran. Both Aagasaveeran and Perarasi visit temples and perform several rituals individually for their reunion.

At the Thoondi Karuppusamy temple, a family deity temple of Aagasaveeran, Perarasi, and her parents arrive for her toddler daughter Magizhini's head tonsuring ceremony without Aagasaveeran's knowledge. Aagasaveeran arrives, intent on taking his daughter back, and interrupts the ceremony, beating the barber Soman. Also, Perarasi's paternal uncle pulls out a hidden gun, which accidentally gets into the hands of Amarasigamani's son, Aagasaveeran's distant relative, who had coincidentally come to the temple for his son's birthday celebration. Aagasaveeran's younger brother joins the fray, leading to a scuffle between him and Arasaangam. At the temple, a petty thief named Chithirai Kumar "Chithirai" is also present, for whom Inspector Parivendhan is searching in connection with a recent theft at Othakadai. Poonganagar Kumar "Madapuli", a drunkard inadvertently informs Parivendhan about the fight between Aagasaveeran's family and Perarasi's family, and Parivendhan heads to the temple to intervene and also to apprehend Chithirai. Soman, who was beaten by Aagasaveeran and his brother, seeks help from his union and his drunkard relatives. At the temple, Pottu appeals to the MLA to help resolve the family dispute, and the MLA assigns village officials to mediate. Perarasi requests a divorce from Aagasaveeran, and her relatives demand that Aagasaveeran's family return her jewels before the separation can be finalised.

Ragavarthini's husband, Nagappaambu, arrives with the divorce documents and the pawned jewels of Perarasi. Aagasaveeran wants to reunite with his wife and daughter, but both families are determined to keep them apart. Amarasigamani intervenes, sharing a similar experience with his sister, and urges the couple to reunite. However, Porchelvan's goons arrive, and Aagasaveeran brutally attacks Porchelvan to avenge his family's earlier assault. Nagappaambu insists that both parties sign the divorce papers, revealing that his wife Ragavarthini's actions contributed to the separation due to her feelings of neglect. As the divorce papers are about to be signed, Pottu has a change of heart, realising she'll be separated from her granddaughter Maghizhini. She asks Aagasaveeran not to sign the papers, but Aagasaveeran decides to sign them anyway, citing the ongoing interference from both mothers-in-law. In a dramatic turn, Pottu takes Maghizhini and escapes in an auto, with Aagasaveeran and Perarasi joining her, after she confessing that she can't live without Aagasaveeran, and Porchelvan chases them. The trio stops midway, and Aagasaveeran and his brother fight back against Porchelvan's henchmen.

Perarasi stops Porchelvan and Aagasaveeran from fighting, and Arasaangam intervenes to prevent Porchelvan's friend from attacking Aagasaveeran. It is revealed that Porchelvan's friend had been lusting after Perarasi and had previously spread false information about Aagasaveeran's family to sabotage their wedding. It turns out that Arasaangam had secretly arranged for Aagasaveeran to attend the head tonsuring ceremony with the help of Logu, a cab driver. Arasaangam slaps his wife Aavarnam for brainwashing Perarasi against her in-laws. Porchelvan, realising his friend's true intentions, seems to let go of his animosity towards Aagasaveeran, but a hidden tension remains. Pottu clarifies that Azhagi is the bride for Aagasaveeran's younger brother, not Aagasaveeran, dispelling Perarasi's misconception. Aagasaveeran apologises to Soman for slapping him and pays off Soman's drunk relatives to calm them down. Inspector Parivendhan arrives at the scene, only to find the family at peace.

Later, Amarasigamani sees both families united and celebrating at Aagasaveeran's hotel. However, it's revealed that Aagasaveeran and Perarasi eventually get a divorce, only to reunite the very next day. Chithirai and Amarasigamani's family witnesses the couple's tumultuous relationship of reuniting despite their divorce.

== Cast ==
- Vijay Sethupathi as Aagasaveeran
- Nithya Menen as Perarasi "Arasi"
- Yogi Babu as Chithirai Kumar "Chithirai"
- Roshini Haripriyan as Ragavarthini
- Deepa Shankar as Pottu
- Myna Nandhini as Nynavathi
- Chemban Vinod Jose as ARK. Arasaangam
- Saravanan as Sembaiyya
- R. K. Suresh as Porchelvan
- Kaali Venkat as Amarasigamani
- Aruldoss as Inspector M. Parivendhan
- Vinod Sagar as Nagappaambu
- Vettai Muthukumar as Sangathalaivan
- Sendrayan as Soman
- Kalki Raja as a tea vendor
- Janaki Suresh as Aavarnam
- Chithra Lakshmanan as a senior politician
- K. P. Jagan as Logu, a cab driver
- Aadithya Kathir as Othaasai
- Baba Bhaskar as Soman's relative
- P. L. Thenappan as a village president
- Lollu Sabha Maaran as a bus conductor
- Ranjana Naachiyar as a councillor
- Jeevitha as Inspector Chithra Krishnan
- Vinodhini Vaidyanathan as a judge
- Rohan Suresh as Aagasaveeran's brother
- Joohi Jayakumar as Azhagi
- Baby Magizh as Aagasaveeran and Perarasi's daughter

== Production ==
=== Development ===
After Merry Christmas (2024), Vijay Sethupathi was reported to sign a family entertainer subject film with Pandiraaj, who last directed Etharkkum Thunindhavan (2022) and to be produced by Lyca Productions. Soon, it was reported that Nithya Menen was approached to play the female lead. On 23 August 2024, the project was officially announced, thereby confirming Nithya Menen as the female lead opposite to Sethupathi, who earlier shared screen together in 19(1)(a) (2022). In early-September 2024, Indiaglitz reported that Mysskin had been cast in as the antagonist, making his maiden on-screen collaboration with Sethupathi, while the latter is appearing in Mysskin's yet to release film, Train. Sethupathi was reported to play the role of a parotta master and in order to make it look authentic, he took training with a real parotta master. The film also features Chemban Vinod Jose, R.K. Suresh, Yogi Babu, Deepa Shankar, Saravanan, and Roshini Haripriyan in important roles. On 2 May 2025, Santhosh Narayanan confirmed his inclusion in this film, which was tentatively titled VJS52, as it is Sethupathi's 52nd film in the lead role. The title-reveal teaser was released on 3 May 2025, thereby revealing the title to be Thalaivan Thalaivii, showing Sethupathi and Menen as husband and wife, engaging in a war of words while making kothu parotta. The film is produced by Sathya Jyothi Films while the film's cinematography is handled by M. Sukumar and editing is handled by Pradeep E. Ragav. The release date was revealed through an announcement teaser along with the names of the characters of the cast.

=== Filming ===
The first schedule of the principal photography began in mid-August 2024 in Chennai, but got stopped mid-way and in late-October 2024 the filming resumed at Tiruchendur, while Pandiraj informed that the filming is planned in places around Thoothukudi, Tiruchendur and Madurai, but was predominantly shot in places around Tiruchirapalli. The filming got wrapped on 23 February 2025. The film was in the post-production stage during the title teaser announcement.

== Music ==
Thalaivan Thalaivii

Soundtrack album by Santhosh Narayanan
- Released: July 19, 2025
- Genre: Feature film soundtrack
- Language: Tamil
- Label: Think Music
- Producer: Santhosh Narayanan

Santhosh Narayanan chronology
Retro (2025)	Thalaivan Thalaivii (2025)	Vaa Vaathiyaar (2025)

Singles from Thalaivan Thalaivii
- 1. "Pottala Muttaye" Released: 9 June 2025; 2. "Aagasa Veeran" Released: 12 July 2025
External audio
- Thalaivan Thalaivii – Jukebox on YouTube

The music is composed by Santhosh Narayanan. The first single "Pottala Muttaye" was released on 9 June 2025. The second video single "Aagasa Veeran" was released on 12 July 2025.

Track listing
No.	Title	Lyrics	Singer(s)	Length
1.	"Pottala Muttaye"	Vivek	Santhosh Narayanan, Sublahshini	3:58
2.	"Sella Kolarey"	Vivek	Kuruji
3.	"Perarasi"		Aditya Ravindran
4.	"Mannichiru"	Karthik Netha	Santhosh Narayanan, Punya Selva, The Indian Choral Ensemble
5.	"Pirivu"		The Indian Choral Ensemble, Santhosh Narayanan
6.	"Aagasa Veeran"	Vivek	Pradeep Kumar, Dhee	3:31

== Release ==
=== Theatrical ===
Thalaivan Thalaivii was released in theatres on 25 July 2025 alongside the Tamil movie Maareesan.

=== Home media ===
The satellite and digital rights of the film were acquired by Amazon Prime Video, Vijay TV and Colors Tamil. The film began streaming on the platform from 22 August 2025 in Tamil and dubbed versions of Telugu, Hindi, Malayalam and Kannada languages.

== Reception ==
=== Critical response ===
Thalaivan Thalaivii received mixed reviews from critics.

Harshini SV of The Times of India gave 4/5 stars and wrote, "However, Thalaivan Thalaivi becomes one of the very few Tamil films that dig into the life after marriage, something after the beginning of the seemingly “Happily ever after,” and Pandiraj has crafted a fun, frustrating family padam". Avinash Ramachandran of Cinema Express gave 3/5 stars and wrote "Pandiraaj reins in the melodrama by relying on relentless comedy that is organically built out of the various relationships depicted in the film, especially the one between Vijay Sethupathi and Nithya Menen's characters." Anusha Sundar of OTT Play gave 2/5 stars and wrote "Thalaivan Thalaivii is a loudly engaging film and it does not quiet hit the mark. Its noise keeps you hooked to the screenplay, but that cannot be considered to being hooked. Even as Vijay Sethupathi and Nithya Menen try to salvage it, the regressive (anti-divorce) writing packed with noisy making, makes the film all over the place and little unruly." Janani K of India Today gave 2/5 stars and wrote "While Nithya Menen and Vijay Sethupathi look the part, it is baffling to see two terrific performers with a considerable fan following glorify such ideas in the garb of upholding culture and family values. [...], Thalaivan Thalaivii is a perfect example of a family entertainer that completely misses the mark on social responsibility." Anandu Suresh of The Indian Express gave 1.5/5 stars and wrote "Although the Vijay Sethupathi-Nithya Menen starrer opens in a jovial manner, once the story settles in, the film becomes a scream-a-thon where almost all characters are simply yelling at each other."
