= Rani: The Real Story =

2023 Indian Malayalam crime thriller film

- Theatrical release poster
- Directed by: Shankar Ramakrishnan
- Written by: Shankar Ramakrishnan
- Produced by: Vinod Menon; Shankar Ramakrishnan; Jimmy Jacob
- Starring: Honey Rose; Urvashi; Bhavana; Indrans; Honey Rose; Maala Parvathy; Guru Somasundaram
- Cinematography: Vinayak Gopal
- Edited by: Appu N. Bhattathiri
- Music by: Mena Melath (Songs); Jonathan Bruce (Score)
- Production companies: Magictail Works Productions; June Ventures
- Distributed by: Capital Cinemas
- Release date: 21 September 2023
- Running time: 117 minutes
- Country: India
- Language: Malayalam

Rani: The Real Story is a 2023 Indian Malayalam-language investigative mystery thriller film written and directed by Shankar Ramakrishnan and jointly produced by Vinod Menon and Shankar Ramakrishnan under the banner of MagicTail Works Productions and co-produced by Jimmy Jacob of June Ventures. The film has an ensemble cast of leading actors, like Urvashi, Honey Rose, Indrans, Guru Somasundaram, Maniyanpilla Raju, Ashwin Gopinath, Ashwath Lal, Bhavana, Niyathi Kadambi, Anumol, Maala Parvathy, alongside Krishnan Balakrishnan, Ambi Neenasam, Ramu Mangalapalli, and Athira Sreekumar in supporting roles.

The music and lyrics were composed by Mena Melath, and the original background score was done by Jonathan Bruce. The cinematography and editing were handled by Vinayak Gopal and Appu Bhattathiri.

Principal photography began on 26 September 2022. The filming took place in and around Thiruvananthapuram and was wrapped up on 31 October 2022. The post-production works were done at Chitranjali Studio. Rani: The Real Story was released on 21 September 2023.

== Synopsis ==
Rani: The Real Story tells the story of a mysterious housemaid accused and framed for the high-profile murder of the powerful MLA Dharmarajan, but strongly defended by three families for whom she works, in the border town of Dharmapuram.Dharmarajan murder case investigation is handled by the police officer who takes the help of bhasi a retired police officer who knows about the place and the village people life. Autopsy report they get as some poison substances injected is the main cause of death. Bhasi finds out the illegal deals by dharmajan as three core money he took from company people to twist the government land under company name. Meanwhile, rani past history is also searched and a priest reveals what happened as there is quarry mafia who is breaking down the hill illegally with dynamites this polluting the water nearby and eliminating the rocky place and those ladies who object or comes across their way gets attacked physically or sexually, but teacher who is there gives support to the people and children there and one day saves a pregnant Rani and delivers her child. Teacher tells dharmajan who was called selva in the past that she will proceed with police complaints if the quarry mafia not stopping breaking the stones. So selvam meets Rony the head of quarry mafia and gets offered money to face the election. Thus selvam comes one day as teacher complaints to police against the quarry mafia, selvam burns everyone there and burns the school, but the news spread it was an accidental fire burst due to the teachers carelessness. Dharmajan after becoming MLA is very powerful and plans a heavy bomb blast when his sister has a stage speech as he tells the company person he can win without anybodys money. Rani has a helping hand in mageshwaris novel completion. One day the novel will be read to dharmajan by Rani that is the story how dharmajan killed the teacher, this enrages dharmajan who tries to attack Rani but Rani hits dharmajan down and now shown teacher who is fully burnt but recovering comes and injects dharmajan to death. Film ends with bhasi showing the police chief was also supporting dharmajan during the firing incident and sharing a smile with Rani who is now working in this police chiefs house.

== Cast ==
- Urvashi as Sheela
- Honey Rose as Nimmi
- Bhavana as Teacher
- Niyathi Kadambi as Rani
- Indrans as Bhasi
- Guru Somasundaram as MLA Dharmarajan
- Maala Parvathy as Maheshwari
- Maniyanpilla Raju as DSP Reghu
- Anumol as Sona
- Krishnan Balakrishnan as CI Soman
- Ashwin Gopinath as Aby
- Ambi Neenasam as Charles
- Aswath as Vinayan
- Ramu Mangalappaly as Lalji

== Production ==
The title of the film was officially announced on 7 March 2023.

=== Filming ===
The makers started the principal photography on 26 September 2022 with the switch-on ceremony and completed it on 31 October 2022. It took 33 days to complete the shoot. The major shooting was completed in Thiruvananthapuram. The post-production of the film started in June.

== Music ==
The music and lyrics are composed by Mena Melath and the original background score is done by Jonathan Bruce. The music rights were acquired by Goodwill Entertainments.

== Release and reception ==
The film was released on 21 September 2023.

=== Critical response ===
Gopika Is of The Times of India wrote "Shanker Ramakrishnan's Rani: The Real Story is the story of women taking their destinies into their own hands. A watchable film that could have been much much better if the screenplay, as well as the dialogues, were worked on".
