= 100 Days of Love =

- Theatrical release poster
- Directed by: Jenuse Mohamed
- Written by: Jenuse Mohamed
- Produced by: K. V. Vijayakumar
- Starring: Dulquer Salmaan; Nithya Menen; Sekhar Menon; Aju Varghese
- Cinematography: Pradeesh M. Varma
- Edited by: Sandeep Kumar
- Music by: Score: Bijibal; Songs: Govind Vasantha
- Distributed by: Aan Mega Media
- Release date: 20 March 2015
- Running time: 155 minutes
- Country: India
- Language: Malayalam

100 Days of Love is a 2015 Indian Malayalam-language romantic comedy film written and directed by debutant Jenuse Mohamed. The film stars Dulquer Salmaan in a dual role, alongside Nithya Menen in the lead roles. The film released worldwide on 20 March 2015. It received mixed reviews from critics. Dialogues were written by Duo writers M R Vibin and Suhail Ibrahim. Production controller is Sanjay Padiyoor

The film was dubbed in Marathi as Shambhar Divas Premache and released on B4U Marathi YouTube Channel, Kannada, Tamil, Bengali, Telugu and Hindi with the same name. Telugu dubbing rights were bought by Abhishek Pictures, who released the film across Andhra Pradesh, Telangana, Karnataka among several other states on 26 August 2016.

== Plot ==
Balan K. Nair, who calls himself BKN, is a reporter in a famous daily based in Bangalore. After insulting his ex-girlfriend on Facebook in a drunken state, Balan feels like his life is not in sync. He is the "loser" of his family, since his brother Rocky is a successful doctor. He left his house to become a columnist. He lives with his close aid Ummar, who is a foodie and an avid computer gamer. One day, Balan meets Sheela when they both get into a taxi at the same time. Balan sees her and instantly falls in love. As the taxi drives away, Balan sees Sheela's bag lying on the floor. Inside the bag, there is an old camera with photo of certain places and certain people in Bangalore. Balan and Ummer use the pictures as clues to try to find Sheela.

Just as Balan begins to lose hope, he meets Sheela at a hospital by chance, where Sheela reveals that she already knows Balan. Apparently, Balan was her bully back when they were in school, and she was also the reason that the whole school ended up hating him and calling him a Loser. He immediately tries to avoid Sheela in the future. However, she keeps meeting him and poses as his girlfriend in his ex-girlfriend's marriage. Due to this, he is avoided from an embarrassing situation and doesn't lose face in front of his elder brother and his ex-girlfriend. He realizes that she is good-natured and they become very good friends.

After a series of meetings and sights, at one of the meeting Balan invites Sheela to a candle-light dinner, where all the comical and embarrassing situations happen which in turn closens their bondage. Balan cooks food and hosts a date-like dinner party to impress Shela. They start to enjoy the meal. Eventually they both begin to talk and Balan starts enquiring Sheela about her future endeavours and there he gets to know some interesting things about her, that she is enjoying life after her studies and also learns about her fiancé Rahul, a multi-millionaire. Balan also learns about her thoughts about marriage and love. Then after the dinner, Balan hands over the lost camera to Sheela, she is delighted and ends up warmly hugging Balan and asks him to join the party that she's attending on the eve of new year. Balan overwhelmingly accepts the invitation and says he's been eagerly waiting to join her and both of them leave to the party.

After reaching the pub, Balan parks the car near a tree and both of them get down to enjoy the party. But in the meantime they realise that Ummar hasn't reached yet, then Balan calls Ummar on a phone, while Sheela goes missing and Balan goes in search of her, but doesn't find her. After a while near the other end of the parking space, Balan finds Sheela who is vomiting. And he's really shocked to watch her vomit as it surprises him, but gazing at her Balan feels sorry and confirms if she is ok.

After a while when Sheela turns behind, Balan goes missing. While she walks further in search of Balan. She finds a group of people anxiously staring at Balan who is struck beside a tree, tightly pressing against his stomach and forcibly letting the contents out, suddenly in fraction of seconds Balan retches loudly and starts vomiting all that he ate. Later they both are seen in a hospital where doctor confirms the reason for their vomiting bouts as "Food Poisoning".

Later Balan lying on hospital bed apologizes Sheela, yet she acts reluctant and ignorant. Balan is distraught, suddenly crackers light up outside on the eve of new year, Balan wishes Sheela and waits for her reply. Finally after few moments, Sheela greets him back and Balan's immediate impetus to puke makes them smile, such comical situations indeed help both of them become yet great friends and Balan develops a strong bond towards Sheela.

Balan helps Sheela to take all the photos of places where her parents fell in love. For the last photo they need to find the old scooter. Balan finds the scooter and they take all the photos and Balan drops Sheela and takes the camera from her and tells her he will edit and give. That night Balan sees Rahul proposing to Sheela. Balan feels upset and lost as he has started loving her again. In the meantime Balan in drunken state comes to Sheela's house and somehow Sheela saves Balan from falling in the eyes of her parents, but to their faith, next day morning Balan is seen lying on the floor at their house by Sheela's parents. Later, he is relieved by Sheela's father and Balan goes on for a coffee with Sheela and Rahul that evening. There he tries to talk to Rahul, but Rahul ends up being extremely possessive and haughty. Balan tries to win Sheela back, but she says she believes in arranged marriages and does not care about love.

At the same time, Ummer tells Balan that he must go to the U.S. to work with his dad. Balan's life spirals out of control. He begins to drink excessively, and Sheela becomes worried for Balan. On Sheela's parents' 25th anniversary, Balan forgets to bring the photos as this is the gift Sheela was planning to give her parents. Balan reaches on time but Sheela tells him to grow up. When the presentation is displayed she realizes that she was included in all the photos along with her parents, which comes as a surprise for her. Later she regrets scolding Balan and goes to apologize a drunken Balan. He tells that it is easy for him to become like Rahul, however he plans to stay "original'. He also tells Sheela that he will come the next morning with the scooter if she was ready to come with him. Next day, Balan plans to go and tells Ummar to give the scooter back but he forgets about what he told the previous night. An excited Sheela comes running out hearing the sound of the scooter expecting Balan but she is disappointed to see only Ummar. They both have a conversation and they head to the railway station where Sheela confesses her love for Balan, and they both live happily ever after.

== Cast ==
- Dulquer Salmaan in a dual role as
  - Balan K Nair
    - Nebish Benson as young Balan
  - Rocky K Nair, Balan's older twin brother
- Nithya Menen as Sheela
- Sekhar Menon as Ummer
- Aju Varghese as Romanch Ramakrishnan / Choriyanpuzhu
- Vineeth as S. P. Pillai, Sheela's father
- Praveena as Sheela's mother
- Rahul Madhav as Rahul
- V. K. Prakash as Chief Editor
- Abhirami Suresh as Pia George
- Jacob Gregory as Bahadur / Njaramban

== Release ==
The film's trailer released on 17 March 2015. The film released on 20 March 2015 over 80 theatres in Kerala alone and close to 175 screens in India. Later the film was dubbed and released in Marathi on B4U Marathi YouTube Channel as Shambhar Divas Premache and also it was dubbed in Kannada, Tamil, Telugu, Bengali and Hindi.

== Critical response ==
Nicy V.P. of IB Times called the film "one of the cutest romantic comedy flicks ever made in Malayalam." She rated the film three and half stars out of five and concluded her review saying, "100 Days of Love is a movie which will make you feel good and assure that life is not as complicated as it appears to be." Sreelakshmi Manghat of Desimartini.com rated the film 4 out of 5 and said that the film is "sickly sweet and a different approach to rom-com from Mollywood". She called the film "one of the best releases of 2015" and stated that director Jenuse Mohamed is "definitely a talent to watch out for." Arathy Kanan of Malayala Manorama said, "100 Days of Love is breezy and great to sit through." She also stated that the director packs up "frames replete with references from all genres of movies and music." Veeyen of Nowrunning.com rated the film two out of five and said, "It takes the wine drenched words of Balan, a rain and a whole lot of thinking for Sheela to decide once and for all, as to what she truly wants from life. It takes infinitely lesser time for us to decipher what '100 Days of Love' is all about - a swoonless romance bereft of smiles or sighs." Deepa Soman of The Times of India rated the film 3 out of 5 and wrote: "100 Days of Love is a stylish film that is nothing out of the ordinary. What is different is the treatment - humour and novelties - the director brings to table that is clever enough to keep us engaged till the last frame." Pramod Thomas of The New Indian Express said, "It [the film] is an old wine which tastes a tad different, and thus watchable." Akhila Menon of Filmibeat.com rated the film two and a half stars and described it as "a very fresh version of so-called clichéd love stories." Behindwoods rated the film 3 out of 5 stars and said, "100 Days of Love is a heartwarming tale that is gentle and natural."

=== Box office ===
The film received mixed to positive reviews and was a commercial success. The film collected ₹ 2.1 crores from first 2 days of its release.

== Soundtrack ==
100 Days of Love

Soundtrack album by Govind Vasantha
- Released: 20 March 2015
- Genre: Feature film soundtrack
- Length: 17:05
- Language: Malayalam
- Label: Satyam Audios

Govind Vasantha chronology
Onnam Loka Mahayudham (2015)	100 Days of Love (2015)	Asuravadham (2018)
External audio
- Audio Jukebox on YouTube

The soundtrack of 100 Days of Love consists of 4 songs composed by Govind Vasantha, the lyrics of which were written by Rafeeq Ahamed, Santhosh Varma and M.R. Vibin.

Tracklist
No.	Title	Lyrics	Singer(s)	Length
1.	"Arike Pozhiyum"	M.R. Vibin	Govind Vasantha	4:38
2.	"Hridayathin"	Rafeeq Ahamed	Vijay Yesudas, Mridula Warrier	4:38
3.	"Manjiloode"	Santhosh Varma	Christine Jose, Divya S. Menon	3:28
4.	"Ninnekaanan"	Santhosh Varma	Benny Dayal	4:10
Total length:				17:05
