= Nandi Awards of 2010 =

Indian Telugu film and TV awards ceremony

The Jury of Nandi Awards announced Nandi Awards for the year 2010 on 5 August 2011 at Film Development Corporation.Radhakrishna directed Vedam won the best film award . Nandamuri Balakrishna has won Best actor Award for Simha and Nithya Menon has won the best actress award for her debut movie Ala Modalaindi.

== 2010 Nandi Awards Winners List ==
Category	Winner	Film	Nandi Type
Best Feature Film	Shobu Yarlagadda and Prasad Devineni	Vedam	Gold
Second Best Feature Film	P. Sunil Kumar Reddy	Gangaputrulu	Silver
Third Best Feature Film	Ravi Vallabhaneni	Prasthanam	Bronze
Nandi Award for Akkineni Award for best home-viewing feature film	Chandra Siddhartha, V. Rama Krishna	Andari Bandhuvaya	Silver
Best Popular Film for Providing Wholesome Entertainment	Shobu Yarlagadda and Prasad Devineni	Maryada Ramanna	Gold
Sarojini Devi Award for a Film on National Integration	C. Kalyan	Parama Veera Chakra	Gold
Best Children's Film			Gold
Second Best Children's Film	Little Buddha	Little Buddha	Copper
Best Director for a Children's Film			Copper
Best Documentary Film	Advaitham	Advaitham	Gold
Second Best Documentary Film	Freedom park	Freedom park	Silver
First best educational film			Golden
Second best educational film			Copper
Best Director	P. Sunil Kumar Reddy	Gangaputrulu	Silver
Best Actor	Balakrishna	Simha	Silver
Best Actress	Nithya Menen	Ala Modalaindi	Silver
Best Supporting Actor	Sai Kumar	Prasthanam	Copper
Best Supporting Actress	Pragathi	Yemaindi Ee Vela	Copper
Best Character Actor	AVS	Kothimooka	Copper
Best Male Comedian	Dharmavarapu Subramanyam	Aalasyam Amrutam	Copper
Best Female Comedian	Jhansi	Simha	Copper
Best Villain	Nagineedu	Maryada Ramanna	Copper
Best Child Actor	Master Bharath	Bindaas	Copper
Best Child Actress			Copper
Best First Film of a Director	B. V. Nandini Reddy	Ala Modalaindi	Copper
Best Screenplay Writer	Gautham Menon	Ye Maaya Chesave	Copper
Best Story Writer	RP Patnaik	Broker	Copper
Best Dialogue Writer	P. Sunil Kumar Reddy	Gangaputrulu	Copper
Best Lyricist	N Siddareddy	Veera Telangana	Copper
Best Cinematographer	Prasad Murella	Namo Venkatesa	Copper
Best Music Director	Chakri	Simha	Copper
Best Male Playback Singer	M. M. Keeravani	Maryada Ramanna	Copper
Best Female Playback Singer	Pranavi	Sneha Geetham	Copper
Best Editor	Kotagiri Venkateswara Rao	Darling	Copper
Best Art Director	Ashok Koralath	Varudu	Copper
Best Choreographer	Prem Rakshith	Adhurs	Copper
Best Audiographer	Radhakrishna	Brindavanam	Copper
Best Costume Designer	Sriram, Sri Kumar	Varudu	Copper
Best Makeup Artist	Sri Gangadhar	Brahmalokam to Yamalokam via Bhoolokam	Copper
Best Fight Master	Sri Sekhar	Manasara	Copper
Best Male Dubbing Artist	RPM Raju	Darling	Copper
Best Female Dubbing Artist	Chinmayi	Ye Maaya Chesave	Copper
Best Special Effects	Sri Alagar Swamy	Varudu	Copper
Special Jury Award	Allu Arjun	Vedam	Copper
Special Jury Award	Samantha	Ye Maaya Chesave	Copper
Special Jury Award	Chandra Siddhartha	Andari Bandhuvaya	Copper
Special Jury Award	Manoj Manchu	Bindaas	Copper
Special Jury Award	Sunil	Maryada Ramanna	Copper
Special Jury Award	Sreeramulu	Vedam	Copper
Nandi Award for Best Book on Telugu Cinema(Books, posters, etc.)	Dr. Paidipala	Dr. Paidipala Telugu Cine Geya Kavula Charitra	Copper
Best Film Critic on Telugu Cinema	Chakravarthy		Copper

== See also ==
- Nandi Awards of 2011
- Nandi Awards of 2012
- Nandi Awards of 2013
- Nandi Awards of 2014
- Nandi Awards of 2015
- Nandi Awards of 2016
