= Praana =

2019 India film

- Theatrical release poster
- Directed by: V. K. Prakash
- Screenplay by: Rajesh Jayaraman
- Produced by: Suresh Raj; Praveen S. Kumar; Anita Raj
- Starring: Nithya Menen
- Cinematography: P. C. Sreeram
- Edited by: Sunil S. Pillai
- Music by: Louis Banks; Arun Vijay; Ratheesh Vegha
- Production companies: SRaj Productions; Real Studio
- Distributed by: Central Pictures
- Release date: 18 January 2019
- Running time: 152 minutes
- Country: India
- Language: Malayalam

Praana (transl. Life) is a 2019 Indian Malayalam-language psychological thriller film directed by V. K. Prakash and written by Rajesh Jayaraman. Nithya Menen is the only person appearing in the film, who plays an English writer named Tara Anuradha. Resul Pookutty and Amrit Pritam was the sound designers and P. C. Sreeram was the cinematographer. Louis Banks, Arun Vijay, and Ratheesh Vegha provided the music for the film. The film was released on 18 January 2019.

== Plot ==
Based on a series of events in the life of an English writer, Tara Anuradha, who dwells in the horrors of her own fears as she focuses on social issues. The movie also deals with intolerance and injustice that is prevailing in the contemporary society.

== Cast ==
- Nithya Menen as Tara Anuradha

== Production ==
Nithya Menen was fluent in Malayalam, Hindi, Kannada and Telugu languages, which helped in shooting the multilingual film. The shooting was done in a hill station in South India. The shooting commenced on 2 October 2018 and was extensively shot in Peerumedu, Kerala.

== Music ==
Louis Banks composed the song "Oru Vaakkin Mounam" sung by Nithya Menen. Arun Vijay composed the original background score and the song "Titliyon Sa" penned by lyricists P. K. Anilkumar in Hindi, Anusha Akasam in Telugu, Harinarayanan B. K. in Malayalam, and Nagarjuna Dixit-HSN Raju in Kannada. Shilpa Raj sung the song in all four languages. She also sang the Sanskrit title song "Praana" composed by Ratheesh Vegha.

== Release ==
The Malayalam version of the film released on 18 January 2019, receiving mixed to positive reviews.
