= Simha (film) =

2010 Indian film by Boyapati Srinu

- Theatrical release poster
- Directed by: Boyapati Srinu
- Written by: Boyapati Srinu
- Produced by: Paruchuri Kireeti
- Starring: Nandamuri Balakrishna; Nayantara; Namitha; Sneha Ullal
- Cinematography: Arthur A. Wilson; Additional Cinematography: Prasad Murella
- Edited by: Kotagiri Venkateswara Rao
- Music by: Chakri
- Production company: United Movies
- Release date: 30 April 2010
- Running time: 156 minutes
- Country: India
- Language: Telugu
- Budget: ₹18 crore
- Box office: ₹36 crore distributors' share

Simha (transl. Lion) is a 2010 Indian Telugu-language action drama film directed by Boyapati Srinu and produced by Paruchuri Kireeti under the United Movies banner. The film stars Nandamuri Balakrishna in a dual role, along with Nayantara, Namitha and Sneha Ullal while Rahman, Sai Kumar, Adithya Menon, Kota Srinivasa Rao and K. R. Vijaya play supporting roles. Music is composed by Chakri, art direction by A. S. Prakash, cinematography by Arthur Wilson and editing by Kotagiri Venkateswara Rao.

Released on 30 April 2010, the film was a blockbuster, ending his streak of failures and ended up becoming the highest-grossing Telugu film of the year, grossing over ₹60 crore at the box office with a distributor's share of ₹36 crore. Balakrishna received his second Nandi Award for Best Actor for this film.

== Plot ==
Srimannarayana is a university lecturer in Hyderabad who lives with his grandmother. He does not tolerate injustice anywhere and beats up people who dare to break the law, a personality which makes him feared and respected among others. A female lecturer Mahima entices him, though he doesn't reciprocate her feelings. While beating up a goon who threatened to throw acid on a girl after she spurned his advances, he accidentally punches a comatose man on the head, waking him from his 28-year coma. This man's name is Veerakesavudu.

One day, a new student Janaki joins the college where Srimannarayana is teaching. She initially thinks he is rowdy after an earlier encounter with him and seeing how everyone in the college fears him, but once she finds out about his true personality, she develops a crush on him. One day, after Srimannarayana rescues her from a group of thugs, she reveals her past. Her father, businessman Jagadish Prasad, has a business rivalry with Gopi, a gangster who happens to be Veerakesavudu's son. After Veerakesavudu woke up from his coma, he ordered Jagadish to give Janaki's hand in marriage to Gopi so their mutual rivalry is finished, to which he agreed, fearing Veerakesavudu's wrath. But Gopi killed Janaki's brother Anand Prasad during the wedding after he insulted him, prompting Jagadish to send Janaki to Hyderabad to continue her studies. The thugs who tried to kidnap her were Gopi's henchmen. On hearing this, Srimannarayana vows to protect Janaki and accommodates her next to his house. He soon reciprocates her feelings for him, prompting Maheswari to drop her love for him.

Unfortunately for Janaki, Gopi finds out she is with Srimannarayana and kidnaps her, only for Srimannarayana to rescue her after a dramatic car chase. When they reach home, they are confronted by Gopi's henchmen. Jagadish arrives there at the same time that Srimannarayana is fighting the henchmen and in a bid to help, accidentally stabs Srimannarayana's grandmother. Srimannarayana is enraged and attempts to kill him, but his grandmother stops him. Jagadish immediately leaves with Janaki. Later, Srimannarayana confronts his grandmother and asks her why she didn't let him kill Jagadish. In reply, she reveals their past.

30 years ago, in the town of Bobbili, Veerakesavudu and his family ran ruthless self-government, tormenting the townsfolk and supported by the police. The only person who dared to fight them back was a doctor named Narasimha, who belonged to the Bobbili royal family and was the father of Srimannarayana. He took the law into his own hands and killed many of Veerakesavudu's henchmen, including his brothers, when he caught them tormenting others. While not killing others, he ran a 24x7 hospital that provided treatment free of cost. His wife Gayatri was an ideal wife who was always affectionate towards Narasimha and supported all his methods. Jagadish, who was Gayatri's brother and who wanted to start a business with Veerakesavudu's help, warned her about Narasimha's dangerous behaviour, but she brushed the warnings aside, having full faith in her husband and his methods. Veerakesavudu and his father decided to eliminate Narasimha and his family by attempting to poison them during a temple function. When the temple priest warned Narasimha about the threat to his life, Narasimha rushed to Veerakesavudu's house and killed all his men as well as his father. However, Veerakesavudu was ultimately successful in killing Narasimha and Gayatri. But just before he died, Narasimha hit Veerakesavudu on the head, sending him into a coma which he woke up from after 28 years. Narasimha's mother, who happens to be Srimannarayana's grandmother, took the young and newly orphaned Srimannarayana away with her to Hyderabad so that he could be brought up away from the violence in Bobbili.

On hearing about his family's past, Srimannarayana decides to take revenge on Veerakesavudu and heads for Bobbili to finish his father's mission. He single-handedly kills Veerakesavudu, Gopi, and their henchmen, fulfilling the wishes of the Bobbili townsfolk who wanted the Veerakesavudu family's reign of terror and horror to be ended for good.

== Cast ==
- Nandamuri Balakrishna in a dual role as
  - Srimannarayana "Simha", a college lecturer
  - Dr. Narasimha, Srimannarayana's father who single-handedly provided justice to the citizens of Bobbili
- Nayanthara as Gayatri, Narasimha's wife and Srimannarayana's mother
- Sneha Ullal as Janaki, a student and Srimannarayana's wife; Jagadish's daughter; Narasimha and Gayatri's daughter-in-law
- Namitha as Mahima, a colleague of Srimannarayana who is madly in love with him
- Rahman as Jagadish Prasad, a businessman, Gayatri's brother and Janaki's father
- Sai Kumar as Veerakesavudu, a gangster and the main antagonist
- K. R. Vijaya as Narasimha's mother; Gayatri's mother-in-law; Srimannarayana's grandmother
- Adithya Menon as Gopi, a gangster and Veerakesavudu's son
- Brahmanandam as Narasimha's compounder
- Kota Srinivasa Rao as Veerakesavudu's father
- Dharmavarapu Subramanyam as Eedara Bhaskar Rao, college principal
- Chalapathi Rao as Superintendent of Police
- Venu Madhav as Venkataratnam, the Sanskrit lecturer who is madly in love with Mahima
- Krishna Bhagavaan as Srimannarayana's servant
- Ravi Prakash as Anand Prasad, Janaki's brother; Srimhannaraya's brother-in-law;
- Sravan as Veerakesavudu's brother
- Hemant Birje as Veerakesavudu's brother
- G.V. Sudhakar Naidu as Veerakesavudu's henchman
- L. B. Sriram
- Jhansi
- Madhusudhan Rao as Politician
- Fish Venkat as Politician's henchman
- Anand Ramaraju as Vicky, Politician's son
- Dhamu Dare as Software engineer

== Production ==
Along with Boyapati, writer Koratala Siva worked on the film. In 2016, Koratala said that he asked for story and dialogue credit but Boyapati responded that he would have to choose only one of them. An angry Koratala walked away and he was credited for neither. Boyapati responded that Koratala should not have raised the issue which happened years ago.

== Soundtrack ==
Simha

Film score by Chakri
- Released: 31 March 2010
- Genre: Soundtrack
- Length: 31:03
- Label: Aditya Music
- Producers: Chakri (songs), S. Chinna (score)

Chakri chronology
Gopi Gopika Godavari (2009)	Simha (2010)	Golimaar (2010)

While S. Chinna composed the film score, all the songs featured in the film were composed by Chakri. Music released on ADITYA Music Company. The music was released on 31 March 2010 directly into market. The audio function of the movie was called off as Nandamuri Balakrishna met with an accident.

No.	Title	Lyrics	Singer(s)	Length
1.	"Janaki Janaki"	Bhaskarbhatla	Kunal Ganjawala, Tina Kamal	4:39
2.	"Achahai"	Chandrabose	Udit Narayan, Anjana Sowmya	4:36
3.	"Orabba"	Chandrabose	Simha, Adarshini	5:34
4.	"Bangarukonda"	Chandrabose	Hariharan, Kausalya	4:38
5.	"Kanulara Chudhamu"	Veturi	Chakri, Malavika	6:10
6.	"Simhamanti"	Chandrabose	Mano, Sravana Bhargavi	4:53
Total length:				31:03

== Reception ==
Upon release, the film opened to mostly positive reviews from audience as well as critics. Sify noted "Simha is out and out a formulaic movie. The urge of director Boyapati Srinu can be clearly felt in the theatre when he showed Balakrishna in an extraordinary manner." Rediff gave a two star rating saying "One knows what to expect from a Balakrishna film and Simha is a perfect example of that: a true mainstream entertainer catering to the masses with high-voltage action, overdose of violence and the mandatory songs. Balakrishna has put in a restrained performance." The Times of India stated "Balakrishna is back in his element as a fiery doctor and does a good job. Nayantara delivers a knock-out performance. While Sneha has no role to play, Namitha exudes enough oomph. Even baddies like Sai kumar, Aditya Menon and Kota Srinivas Rao put in a decent performance".

== Box office ==
Simha collected more than ₹31.48 crore distributor share and became highest grossing Telugu film of the year. The film ran for 50 days in 338 centers and 100 days in 92 centres.

== Accolades ==
Award (Note: Awards, festivals and organizations are in alphabetical order.)	Date of ceremony (Note: Date is linked to the article about the awards held that year, wherever possible.)	Category	Recipient(s)	Result	Ref.
CineMAA Awards	20 June 2011	Best Actor	Balakrishna	Won	
Filmfare Awards South	2 July 2011	Best Film – Telugu	Paruchuri Kireeti – United Movies	Nominated	
Filmfare Awards South	2 July 2011	Best Director – Telugu	Boyapati Srinu	Nominated	
Filmfare Awards South	2 July 2011	Best Actor – Telugu	Balakrishna	Nominated	
Filmfare Awards South	2 July 2011	Best Actress – Telugu	Nayanthara	Nominated	
Filmfare Awards South	2 July 2011	Best Male Playback Singer – Telugu	Hariharan – (for song "Bangaru Konda")	Nominated	
Filmfare Awards South	2 July 2011	Best Female Playback Singer – Telugu	Kousalya – (for song "Bangaru Konda")	Nominated	
Nandi Awards	5 August 2011	Best Actor	Balakrishna	Won	
Nandi Awards	5 August 2011	Best Comedian Actress	Jhansi	Won	
Nandi Awards	5 August 2011	Best Music Director	Chakri	Won	
