= Masterpeace (TV series) =

Indian drama series

- Genre: Comedy drama
- Written by: Praveen S
- Directed by: Sreejith N
- Starring: Nithya Menen; Sharaf U Dheen; Renji Panicker; Parvathi T.; Ashokan; Shanthi Krishna
- Composer: Bijibal
- Country of origin: India
- Original language: Malayalam
- No. of seasons: 1
- No. of episodes: 5

Production
- Producer: Mathew George
- Cinematography: Aslam K Purayil
- Editor: Riyas K Badhar
- Camera setup: Single-camera
- Running time: 45 minutes
- Production company: Central Advertising

Original release
- Network: Disney+ Hotstar
- Release: 25 October 2023

Masterpeace is an Indian Malayalam-language comedy drama streaming television series written by Praveen S and directed by Sreejith N. The series was produced by Mathew George under the banner of Central Advertising, stars Nithya Menen, Sharaf U Dheen, Renji Panicker, Parvathi T., Ashokan and Shanthi Krishna in the lead. It premiered on Disney+ Hotstar on 25 October 2023.

== Synopsis ==
Set in Kochi, Riya and Binoy, a recently married couple living in a high-end apartment, they love each other but usually have some quarrels over some silly issues. In such a quarrel, Binoy accidentally tapped on Father Savarios, his relative's phone number in his phone and called. Binoy didn't know about the call, Savarios heard their quarrel and informed Aniyamma, Binoy's mother. Aniyamma informed Riya's parents too. Both parents suspect that Riya and Binoy are acting as happy couple in front of them. To check this and solve the issues, their parents planned a visit to their apartment without informing them. Rest of the story is about how Riya and Binoy convinces their parents about their life.

== Cast ==
- Nithya Menen as Riya
- Sharaf U Dheen as Binoy
- Renji Panicker as Chandichan
- Parvathi T. as Aniyamma
- Ashokan as Kuriyachan
- Shanthi Krishna as Lisamma
- Roshan Mathew as Adam Michel Anchallo
- Jude Anthany Joseph as Father Savarios
- Anand Manmadhan as Adarsh
- Divya Pillai as Aparna
- Srikant Murali as Viji Sir
- Pooja Mohanraj as Rashmitha
- Vineeth Thattil David as Ankamali Alochana
- Laly PM as Roslin Anty
- Anakha as Inner Peace model
- Priya as Achumani
- Althaf Salim as Binoy's assistant

== Production ==
The announcement of the series was made on Disney+ Hotstar, consisting of five episodes. Nithya Menen, Sharaf U Dheen, Renji Panicker, Parvathi T., Ashokan and Shanthi Krishna joined the cast.

== Reception ==
Janani K of India Today awarded the series 2.5/5 stars. Anandu Suresh of The Indian Express gave the series 2.5/5 stars. Sanjith Sidhardhan of OTTPlay rated the series 3/5 stars. Raisa Nasreen of Times Now gave the series 3/5 stars. Sajin Shriijth of Cinema Express rated the film 4/5 stars.

The series was also reviewed by S.R. Praveen for The Hindu.
