= Aidondla Aidu =

- Directed by: V. K. Prakash
- Written by: Jayaprakash Kuloor
- Produced by: Vachan Shetty; Sajitha Prakash
- Starring: Devaraj; Shruti; Harish Raj; Nithya Menen; Padmapriya; C. R. Simha
- Cinematography: K. U. Mohanan; Santosh Rai Pathaje; Loganathan Srinivasan; R Ganesh; Preetha Jayaraman
- Edited by: Suresh Urs
- Music by: Ousepachan; Alphonse Joseph; Vijay Prakash; Abhijith - Joe; Balamurali
- Production companies: Innostorm Entertainment Group; Trends AdFilm Makers (P) Ltd.
- Release date: 16 September 2011
- Running time: 130 minutes
- Country: India
- Language: Kannada

Aidondla Aidu is a 2011 Indian Kannada language anthology drama film directed by V. K. Prakash and produced by Vachan Shetty and Sujitha Prakash. The film is based on the extracts from 18 Natakangal, a Sahitya Akademi award-winning collection of short stories written by Jayaprakash Kuloor. The story is centered on man-woman relationships, which is weaved into a single story encapsulating the struggles of a filmmaker, exploring different facets of the institution called marriage.

The film was screened at the Indian Panorama section of the International Film Festival of India and other film festivals.

The film was released on 16 September 2011 across Karnataka and was later remade in Malayalam as Poppins. The film met critical appraisals however commercially it could not be successful.

== Plot ==
Totally, there are four short stories told in the film. The first story is called "Payasa", the second "Kannadi", third is about a veteran actor played by Devaraj and fourth is called "Soruva Mane". All the tales revolve around the relationships between a husband and wife and although each explores different facets of the marital relationship, at their core they involve communication and the consequences of misconception.

== Cast ==
Payasa	Kannadi		Soruva Mane
Nithya Menen as Gowri; Harish Raj	Shruti as wife; Sihi Kahi Chandru as husband	Devaraj	Padmapriya; Ajith Hande

- Dileep Raj as Kantha
- Vrinda Samartha as Kantha's wife
- Apoorva Kasaravalli
- C. R. Simha
- Veena Bhat
- Ravishankar

== Production ==
K. U. Mohanan's segment was shot in the dry season in December and rain machines were used to simulate rain.

== Soundtrack ==
Aidondla Aidu

Soundtrack album by Various
- Released: 2010
- Genre: Film soundtrack
- Label: Saregama

A total of 5 music composers teamed up to score the music for this film containing 4 different short stories. While Sudhakar Bannanje was the sole lyric writer for all the songs except one, Yogesh wrote for one single song. The composers include Ousepachan, Vijay Prakash, Alphonse Joseph, Abhijith & Jyothi Balakrishnan and Balamurali most of whom are the Malayalam film music directors. The audio launch happened at Bangalore with eminent director T. S. Nagabharana as the chief guest.

All lyrics are written by Sudhakar Bannanje.

Track listing
No.	Title	Singer(s)	Length
1.	"Naa Kattuva"	Jayachandran
2.	"Payasa"	Nithya Menen
3.	"Kannadi (Lyrics by Yogesh)"	Vijay Prakash
4.	"Kanna Bimba"	Jayachandran
5.	"Male Bandaga"	Sithara
6.	"Hoyyuthide"	Sithara
7.	"Neeragi Hodare"	Ousepachan, Mili Nair
8.	"Payasa (remix)"	Abhijith, Shylanth, Jyothis Balakrishna
9.	"Hoyyuthide"	Vijay Prakash
10.	"Male Bandaga"	Naveen Iyer

== Reception ==
A critic wrote that "These four stories within the main narrative succeed in different ways; the use of different cinematographers and one editor helps to give each story a separate feel. The songs in each story are well integrated into each part and work very well. There is much gentle comedy in the stories which grows out of the various relationships depicted".

== Awards ==
- Karnataka State Film Award for Best Editor - Suresh Urs
