= Okka Ammayi Thappa =

- Poster
- Directed by: Rajasimha Tadinada
- Written by: Rajasimha Tadinada
- Produced by: Anji Reddy
- Starring: Sundeep Kishan; Nithya Menen; Ravi Kishan
- Cinematography: Chota K. Naidu
- Edited by: Gautham Raju
- Music by: Mickey J Meyer
- Production company: Anji Reddy productions
- Release date: 10 June 2016
- Country: India
- Language: Telugu

Okka Ammayi Thappa (transl. Except one girl) is a 2016 Indian Telugu-language action drama film directed by Rajasimha Tadinada. Produced by Anji Reddy, it features Sundeep Kishan and Nithya Menen in the lead roles as the main protagonists along with Ravi Kishan in a pivotal role as the main antagonist. Produced by Anji Reddy with music composed by Mickey J Meyer.

The film was dubbed into Hindi as Asli Fighter in 2018.

== Plot ==
To secure the release of his leader Aslam (Rahul Dev) from prison, terrorist Anwar (Ravi Kishan) plans a major attack in Hyderabad. Using two trucks to cause simultaneous accidents at both ends of a busy viaduct, he traps hundreds of vehicles on the bridge. However, the bombs he has planted on the viaduct fail to detonate as planned. The man responsible for activating them cannot be reached and is nowhere to be found. Anwar panics as his operation appears to be falling apart.

Among the stranded motorists are Krishna Vachan (Sundeep Kishan) and Satyabhama (Nithya Menen), whose vehicles are parked next to each other. They strike up a brief conversation and are attracted to each another. Krishna soon realizes that Satyabhama is "Mango," his childhood crush whom he has been searching for for years. Eager to reconnect with her, he attempts to give her his phone number. Too shy to do so directly, he writes it on a large sheet of paper and holds it up for her to see.

Watching from a nearby building, Anwar notices Krishna's display and decides to use him to salvage his plan. He calls Krishna using the number written on the paper. To prove that he is serious, Anwar shoots a bird near Krishna and Mango with a sniper rifle, convincing Krishna that he can kill Mango at any moment. Threatening to shoot Mango if he disobeys, Anwar forces Krishna to follow his instructions.

Anwar orders Krishna to perform a series of actions involving electrical wiring on the viaduct and ensures that Mango remains seated in a nearby rickshaw. Krishna reluctantly complies. Anwar then reveals that Krishna has unknowingly activated the bombs planted on the bridge, along with electrified wires positioned at both ends of the viaduct that will kill anyone attempting to cross them. He also directs Krishna to a gun hidden on the bridge.

After being trapped in traffic for hours, Mango decides to leave. Krishna desperately tries to persuade her to stay, but she refuses because he cannot explain the real reason. His increasingly aggressive attempts to stop her alarm the surrounding crowd, who assume he is harassing her. When the crowd intervenes, Krishna pulls out the gun to scare them away. At that moment, Anwar shoots a bystander, making it appear as though Krishna fired the shot. Panic spreads among the crowd as people attempt to flee, but Krishna stops them by warning them about the electrified wires at both ends of the bridge.

The authorities and media soon arrive at the scene. Krishna is widely believed to be the terrorist responsible for hijacking the viaduct. Anwar instructs him to tell the police that he wants to meet the Police Commissioner and the Home Minister, threatening to kill the Home Minister's daughter if his demands are not met. Krishna is shocked to discover that the daughter in question is Mango. He now understands why Anwar insisted that she remain on the bridge. Anwar also orders Krishna to demand Aslam's release, but Krishna refuses.

Meanwhile, Anwar's accomplice, who was supposed to activate the bombs, is revealed to have abandoned the plan due to a crisis of conscience. He surrenders to the police and explains the truth. The authorities realize that Krishna is not a terrorist but an unwilling participant acting under Anwar's threats. They raid Anwar's hideout, only to discover that he has escaped moments before their arrival. His communication with Krishna is cut off, leaving Krishna uncertain about what to do next.

A Deputy Inspector General of Police arrives at the scene and offers to negotiate directly with Krishna on the bridge. Unbeknownst to everyone else, the DIG is actually Anwar in disguise. During their conversation, the DIG claims that Anwar has kidnapped his children and is threatening him as well. He begs Krishna to cooperate with Anwar's demands. However, Krishna notices several inconsistencies in the DIG's story and realizes that he is lying. Suspecting that he is directly involved in the conspiracy, Krishna confronts him at gunpoint.

Enraged, the DIG reveals himself as Anwar and pulls out the bomb detonator in an attempt to force Krishna's compliance. Before he can act, the stranded crowd overpowers him and brings him down. The crisis is resolved and the hostages are rescued.

In the aftermath, Krishna and Mango reunite and eventually get married.

== Cast ==
- Sundeep Kishan as Krishna Vachan
- Nithya Menen as Mango / Satyabhama
- Ravi Kishan as Anwar
- Rahul Dev as Aslam Bhai
- Ali
- Prudhviraj
- Tanikella Bharani
- Ajay as Krishna's elder brother
- Brahmaji as Police Officer
- Saptagiri
- Thagubothu Ramesh
- Rohini
- Nalini
- Jeeva
- Fish Venkat
- Dhanraj
- Venu Yeldandi
- Jayaprakash
- Bhadram
- Gundu Sudarshan

== Production ==
The film's first look was released on 15 April 2016. The music was released on 8 May 2016. The audio launch was held in Hyderabad.

== Soundtrack ==
The soundtrack comprises 5 songs composed by Mickey J. Meyer. Aditya Music acquired its marketing rights.

Okka Ammayi Thappa

Soundtrack album by Mickey J. Meyer
- Released: 8 May 2016
- Recorded: 2016
- Genre: Soundtrack
- Length: 13:50
- Label: Aditya Music
- Producer: Mickey J. Meyer

Mickey J. Meyer chronology
A Aa (2016)	Okka Ammayi Thappa (2016)	Shatamanam Bhavati (2017)

Track-List
No.	Title	Lyrics	Singer(s)	Length
1.	"Kotta Kadhalay"	Sri Sasi Jyothsna	Ramya Behara	1:51
2.	"Kaav Kaav"	Sri Sasi Jyothsna	Abhay Jodhpurkar, Haricharan	2:57
3.	"Yegirenay Yegirenay"	Sri Mani	Abhay Jodhpurkar, Ramya Behara	3:55
4.	"Sarihaddu Lopala"	Sri Sasi Jyothsna	Aditya	2:22
5.	"Druvam Druvam"	Dr. Ramalinga Sharma	Karthik, Sri Krishna	2:45
Total length:				13:50

== Release ==
The film was released on 10 June 2016 across Telangana and Andhra Pradesh.

== Reception ==
A critic from The Times of India wrote that "The script is nine years old, so is the execution. A concept which had so much to offer falls flat under distracted direction". A critic from The Hindu opined that "within 30 minutes into the film you are left wondering what’s happening on screen. At regular intervals, annoying characters pop up".

== Box office ==
Okka Ammayi Thappa grossed ₹1.3 crore on opening day at AP/Telangana boxoffice.
