= Poppins =

2012 Malayalam film

- Theatrical release poster
- Directed by: V. K. Prakash
- Written by: Jayaprakash Kuloor
- Based on: 18 Natakangal by Jayaprakash Kuloor
- Produced by: Darshan Ravi
- Starring: Kunchacko Boban; Jayasurya; Indrajith Sukumaran; Meghana Raj; Nithya Menen; Parvati Nair; Padmapriya; Ann Augustine; Siddique; Shankar Ramakrishnan; Mythili
- Cinematography: Jomon T. John; Arun James; Pradeesh M. Varma
- Edited by: Mahesh Narayanan
- Music by: Ratheesh Vegha
- Production company: Dimac Creations
- Distributed by: Central Pictures
- Release date: 30 November 2012
- Country: India
- Language: Malayalam

Poppins is a 2012 Indian Malayalam-language anthology film directed by V. K. Prakash. It stars ten lead actors, appearing as five couples; the characters are played by Kunchacko Boban and Nithya Menen, Jayasurya and Meghna Raj, Indrajith Sukumaran and Padmapriya, Shankar Ramakrishnan and Mythili, Ann Augustine and Siddique. The film was shot with two cameras at the same time by Jomon T. John and Arun.

The film is an adaptation of the award-winning Sahitya Akademi play 18 Natakangal by Jayaprakash Kuloor. Prakash had already adapted this play into a Kannada film titled Aidondla Aidu. The plot is centred on man-woman relationships which is weaved into a single story encapsulating the struggles of a filmmaker, exploring different facets of marriage. Nithya Menen and Padmapriya reprised their role from the Kannada film.

== Plot ==
All the tales revolve around the relationships between a husband and wife and although each explores different facets of the marital relationship, at their core, they involve communication and the consequences of misconception.

== Cast ==
- Kunchacko Boban as Unni
- Jayasurya as the husband in the movie Kannadi
- Indrajith Sukumaran as Kanthan
- Shankar Ramakrishnan as Hari
  - Master Dhananjay as young Hari
- Nithya Menen as Ammu, Unni's wife
- Meghana Raj as the wife in the movie Kannadi
- Padmapriya Janakiraman as Kantha, Kanthan's wife
- Ann Augustine as Ann, a journalist
- Mythili as Gauri, Hari's wife
- Siddique as Sajan, the film actor
- P. Balachandran as Gabriyel Methalakuzhi
- Saiju Kurup as George, Gabriyel's son
- Sreelatha Namboothiri as Nancy, Gabriyel's fiance
- Kochu Preman as Alex, Hari's senior officer
- Indrans as Charlie, the film producer
- Jayaraj Warrier as Appu, the film producer
- Nandu as Babu, the film producer
- Parvathy Nair as Julie, Job's wife
- Baby Nayanthara as Chakki, Hari's daughter
- Jayaprakash Kuloor as Ammu's father
- Moly Kannamali as Annamma, the servant
- Maya Vishwanath as Geetha
- Hareesh Pengan as the driver

== Production ==
It is a new thought that the director wanted his critically acclaimed film Aidondla Aidu to be made into Malayalam. After completing Trivandrum Lodge, the director wanted to try a different Aidondla Aidu. The director was selective in choosing hardworking young and character-suiting actors. Kunchacko Boban and Nithya Menen were chosen to play a pivotal couple, and Jayasurya and Meghana Raj were chosen to play a supporting couple. This is the second time the pair has come together; the first was the director's Beautiful. Jayasurya was cast again after V. K. Prakash's Trivandrum Lodge in which he played the lead role.

The shooting of the film began on 10 June 2012. Jomon T. John is the cinematographer. The film was shot in Bangalore and Trivandrum in two schedules.

== Soundtrack ==
The audio release of Poppins by V. K. Prakash was a star-studded affair with the entire cast and other guests attending the function. Among the cast, Jayasurya, Meera Nandan, Aparna Nair, and Sarayu were present. Ratheesh Vegha's music was the highlight of the day. He had also penned the lyrics of the songs. G. Venugopal and Sithara lent their voices. The audio release was officially carried out by East Coast Vijayan, and the CD was first given to Shankar Ramakrishnan by Jayasurya. East Coast Vijayan had coordinated the entire function that was held on 24 Nov 2012. Nithya Menon sings the Malayalam version of the same song she sang for in "Aidu Ondla Aidu".

== Reception ==
The film opened to negative reviews from critics and audiences alike. Sify.com gave the verdict "Below Average" and said, "Poppins is a lazy film, which takes the viewer for a ride. Unlike the sweet that it has named after, this one is disturbingly tasteless and has been made without much honesty." Paresh C Palicha of Rediff.com rated the film two out of five start and concluded his review saying that the film is a "very bland one."
