= Police (2005 film) =

- Directed by: V. K. Prakash
- Written by: P. Balachandran; Shyam Krishna Saran
- Produced by: Sajitha Prakash
- Starring: Prithviraj Sukumaran; Indrajith Sukumaran
- Cinematography: V. Manikandan
- Music by: Ouseppachan
- Release date: 24 June 2005
- Country: India
- Language: Malayalam

Police is a 2005 Indian Malayalam-language action thriller film directed by V. K. Prakash and written by P. Balachandran and Shyam Krishna Saran. It stars Prithviraj Sukumaran, Indrajith Sukumaran and Sachin Khedekar. The film tells the story of two undercover police officers chasing a drug mafia. It was dubbed and released in Tamil with the same title. The film is loosely based on the 1989 American buddy cop action comedy film Tango & Cash.

== Plot ==
Shekhar and Anand are two rival policemen in Kerala. They are worlds apart from each other in personalities, and work for the narcotics department. While Shekhar goes about his duty in a ruthless street cop manner, Anand's approach is professional and sophisticated. Both men in their different styles cause mayhem among the drug cartels which results in great loss for two drug kingpins Reji Alan and his brother, Saji.

Amidst the fast-paced action love blossoms between Shekhar and Sethulakshmi, a girl who takes care of his mother. The relationship is portrayed through humor and mischief. Meanwhile, Anand, a deep-rooted family man, is bound by his brotherly devotion to his sister, Keerthi. The plot twists and turns with deceit and deception.

== Cast ==
- Prithviraj Sukumaran as ACP Shekar Varma IPS, Anti Narcotics Cell
- Indrajith Sukumaran as ACP Anand Jacob IPS, Anti-Narcotics Cell
- Sachin Khedekar as Reji Alan (Voice dubbed by Rajiv Menon)
- Ashokan as Saji Alan
- Chaya Singh as Keerthi Jacob
- Bhavana as Sethulakshmi
- Ramu as Commissioner Iqbal IPS
- Kalabhavan Shajon as Chandran
- KPAC Lalitha as Ammukutty Amma
- Abu Salim as prisoner
- Kulappulli Leela

== Production ==
According to Prakash, Police is perhaps the first South Indian film to use the digital intermediate (DI) technology for color grading.

== Soundtrack ==
The film's soundtrack contains seven songs, all composed by Ouseppachan, with lyrics by Joffi Tharakan.

#	Title	Singer(s)
1	"Kaanakkannil Kaanum"	Balu, K. S. Chitra
2	"Kanneerumaayi"	G. Venugopal
3	"Manju Veenu"	Sujatha Mohan
4	"Nin Nizhalaay"	Anoop Sankar
5	"Nin Nizhalaay"	K. S. Chitra
6	"Oru Manvilakku"	K. S. Chitra, Franco, Balu
7	"Vennilaavil"	Biju Narayanan
