= Karmayogi (2012 film) =

2012 film by V. K. Prakash

- Film poster
- Directed by: V. K. Prakash
- Written by: Balram Mattannur
- Based on: Hamlet by Shakespeare
- Produced by: Vachan Shetty; Sajitha Prakash
- Starring: Indrajith; Nithya Menon; Padmini Kolhapure; Saiju Kurup
- Narrated by: Renjith
- Cinematography: R. D. Rajasekhar
- Edited by: Beena Paul
- Music by: Ousepachan
- Production companies: Trends Add Films; Innostorm Entertainment Group; Creative Land Pictures
- Release date: 16 March 2012
- Country: India
- Language: Malayalam

Karmayogi is a 2012 Indian Malayalam-language film directed by V. K. Prakash, starring Indrajith, Nithya Menon, Padmini Kolhapure, Saiju Kurup, Ashokan, Thalaivasal Vijay and Manikuttan. The film's screenplay is written by Balram Mattannur. It is an adaptation of Shakespeare's Hamlet. Indrajith plays the protagonist in the film.

== Plot ==
The film tells the story of Rudran Gurukkal, the lone male descendant of the Chathothu family. The family represents the Yogi community, in which Lord Shiva is believed to have been born. Rudran is haunted by and hostage to his destiny. This forms the crux of the story.

== Cast ==
- Indrajith as Rudran Gurukkal
- Nithya Menon
- Padmini Kolhapure as Mankamma, Rudran's mother
- Saiju Kurup
- Ashokan
- Thalaivasal Vijay
- Manikuttan
- Anoop Sankar
- Kani Kusruti
- M. R. Gopakumar

== Accolades ==
- Karmayogi was screened in the competition section at the 42nd International Film Festival of India (IFFI), in Panaji, Goa in 2011.
- Karmayogi was screened in the Malayalam Cinema Today section at the 16th International Film Festival of Kerala (IFFK), in Thiruvananthapuram, Kerala in 2011.
- Rizabawa won the 2011 Kerala State Awards for dubbing for his work in the film.
