= Ala Modalaindi =

2011 film by B.V. Nandini Reddy

- Promotional poster
- Directed by: Nandini Reddy
- Written by: Nandini Reddy
- Produced by: K. L. Damodar Prasad
- Starring: Nani; Nithya Menen; Sneha Ullal
- Cinematography: Arjun Jena
- Edited by: Marthand K. Venkatesh
- Music by: Kalyani Malik
- Distributed by: Sri Ranjith Movies
- Release date: 21 January 2011
- Running time: 135 minutes
- Country: India
- Language: Telugu
- Budget: ₹4 crore
- Box office: est. ₹15 crore distributors' share

Ala Modalaindi (transl. 'That is how it started') is a 2011 Indian Telugu-language romantic comedy film written and directed by B. V. Nandini Reddy (in her directoral debut) under the Sri Ranjith Movies banner. It stars Nani, Nithya Menen (in her Telugu debut) and Sneha Ullal with the music composed by Kalyani Malik. The film's cinematography is performed by Arjun Jena with editing by Marthand K. Venkatesh.

Released on 21 January 2011, the film opened to favorable reviews by critics and became a commercial success. The film grossed ₹150 million (equivalent to ₹340 million or US$3.5 million in 2026) on a budget of ₹40 million (equivalent to ₹90 million or US$930,000 in 2026). Reddy won the Nandi Award for Best First Film of a Director SIIMA Award for Best Debut Director – Telugu. The film is considered one of the "25 Greatest Telugu Films Of The Decade" by Film Companion. The film is remade in Tamil as Yennamo Yedho (2014), in Kannada as Bhale Jodi (2016) and in Bangladeshi Bengali as Olpo Olpo Premer Golpo (2014).

== Plot ==
The film begins with an accident. Gautam is abducted by John Abraham. On the way, Gautam is forced to narrate his tale as he talks of stopping a marriage and John too talks of preventing a wedding. Hence, the flashback. Gautam is ready to propose to Simran with a bunch of roses, but destiny has other plans. Elsewhere, Nithya is playing cricket and hits Gautam with her shot. He is then taken to the hospital in the stretcher. Simran falls in love with Dr. Anand, who was treating Gautam and they get married eventually. Gautam is invited and leaves for the wedding, but cannot face Simran. When he walks out, he gets drunk and meets a drunk Nithya who actually was in love with Anand. They dance and sing throughout the night before parting ways the next day.

As destiny has it, they happen to meet in a pub after a few days. Gautam accompanies her everywhere for her daily endeavors. He realises he's in love with her, but before he could tell her, he finds out that she is already engaged. Gautam steps back and stays secluded. Nithya and her fiancé end their engagement over an argument about Gautam. Unaware of this and having moved on, Gautam starts dating a veterinary doctor Kavya, but they break up after an altercation. Gautham's mother suddenly passes away after a brain hemorrhage and Kavya visits to express condolences. Nithya realizes that she loves Gautam and goes to his house to pay condolences and to propose to him, but is shocked to see Kavya in his house. Thinking that they both are married, she leaves to Bangalore and accepts the marriage proposal her parents set for her. After realizing Nithya misunderstood him, Gautam and his friends leave for Bangalore to stop the marriage.

On the way to Bangalore, their car stops and Gautam asks for a lift and they accept and that is where he was kidnapped. After a big fight between Gautam and John Abraham, it is revealed that John Abraham was looking for the one who gave Gautam a lift, not Gautam. He helps Gautam to reach the wedding. Gautam's friends, who reach the wedding hall, reveal the truth to Nithya. In order to meet Gautam, Nithya escapes from the wedding and ends up asking John Abraham for a lift, who accepts looking at the jewellery she is wearing. After listening to her, John realizes that she is the Nithya that Gautam came for. He drives back the car to the wedding hall and Nithya take the gun and kidnaps Gautam. Then after a comical scuffle, Nithya reunites with Gautam.

== Cast ==
- Nani as Gautam
- Nithya Menen as Nithya
- Sneha Ullal as Kavya
- Ashish Vidyarthi as John Abraham
- Rohini as Revathi, Gautam's mother
- Chaitanya Krishna as Deepak, Nithya's fiancé
- Thagubothu Ramesh as Gautam
- Pragathi as Nithya's mother
- Sivannarayana Naripeddi as Sivannarayana, Nithya's uncle
- Mirchi Hemanth as Gautam's friend
- Snigdha as Pinky
- Praveen as Rowdy
- Dhanraj as Rowdy
- Chanti as Rowdy
- Uppalapati Narayana Rao as Nithya's father
- Nandini Reddy as Pinky's neighbour (cameo)
- Kriti Kharbanda as Simran (cameo)
- Kamesh Sista as Dr. Anand (cameo)

== Release ==
The film was released on 21 January 2011.

=== Dubbed versions ===
The film's Malayalam dubbed version, titled Angane Thudangi, is released in Kerala on 28 July 2011. The film got a wide release. Angane Thudangi was the first Malayalam film (though dubbed) to be made available for online viewing on the same day as its release. This arrangement was made by Mathrubhumi, who also released the music for the Malayalam version. The home video of Angane Thudangi was released by Hot & Sour on 2 December 2011.

== Reception ==
Rediff gave a four star rating, stating "All in all Ala Modalaindi is a fun ride" explaining "Nani and Nithya are at their natural best. Both are so effortless and at ease and share a great chemistry. They are expressive in a range of emotions too."

Sify also gave a 4/5 star rating, noting "Nandini Reddy's plot is simple but her screenplay is knitted with many twists and turns and that makes the movie a pleasant watch. Nani and Nithya Menen score in performance."

Review sites IdleBrain and GreatAndhra, which also gave 4 ratings, praised the lead pair's performance.

The film ran for 100 days theatrically.

== Soundtrack ==
Kalyani Malik has composed the songs and soundtrack for the film.

=== Telugu original soundtrack ===
No.	Title	Lyrics	Performer(s)	Length
1.	"Cheli Vinamani"	Sirivennela Seetharama Sastry	Vedala Hemachandra	4:18
2.	"Innalu Naa Kallu"	Anantha Sreeram	Geetha Madhuri, Kalyani Malik	4:16
3.	"Edo Anukunte"	Lakshmi Bhupal	Nithya Menen, Deepu	3:51
4.	"Oo Baby"	Veena Sahithi	Veena Sahiti	4:47
5.	"Ammammo Ammo"	Anantha Sriram	Nithya Menen, Kalyani Malik	4:24

=== Malayalam dubbed soundtrack ===
The music for the Malayalam version was composed by Jassie Gift, based on the tunes in the original film. The lyrics for Angane Thudangi were written by Siju Thuravoor.

No.	Title	Artist(s)	Length
1.	"Ammammo Ammo"	Najim Arshad, Nithya Menon	4:32
2.	"Entho Nedunne"	Nithya Menon, Salin	3:41
3.	"Kandille Nee"	Najim Arshad, Sindhu Premkumar	4:28
4.	"Nenjin Veena Meetti"	Jassie Gift	4:09
5.	"Oh Baby"	Ranjini Jose & chorus	3:33

== Awards and nominations ==
Award	Date of ceremony	Category	Nominee	Result	Ref.
Filmfare Awards South	7 July 2012	Best Director – Telugu	B. V. Nandini Reddy	Nominated	
Filmfare Awards South	7 July 2012	Best Actress – Telugu	Nithya Menen	Nominated	
Filmfare Awards South	7 July 2012	Best Music Director – Telugu	Kalyani Malik	Nominated	
Filmfare Awards South	7 July 2012	Best Lyricist – Telugu	Sirivennela Seetharama Sastry for "Ammammo Ammo"	Nominated	
Filmfare Awards South	7 July 2012	Best Female Playback Singer – Telugu	Nithya Menen for "Ammammo Ammo"	Nominated	
South Indian International Movie Awards	22 June 2012	Best Film (Telugu)	Ala Modalaindi	Nominated	
South Indian International Movie Awards	22 June 2012	Best Debut Director (Telugu)	B. V. Nandini Reddy	Won	
South Indian International Movie Awards	22 June 2012	Best Female Debut (Telugu)	Nithya Menen	Nominated	
South Indian International Movie Awards	22 June 2012	Best Supporting Actor (Telugu)	Ashish Vidyarthi	Nominated	
South Indian International Movie Awards	22 June 2012	Best Comedian (Telugu)	Thagubothu Ramesh	Nominated	
South Indian International Movie Awards	22 June 2012	Best Female Playback Singer (Telugu)	Nithya Menen for "Ammammo Ammo"	Nominated	
South Indian International Movie Awards	22 June 2012	Best Music Director (Telugu)	Kalyani Malik	Nominated	
Nandi Awards	05 August 2011	Best First Film of a Director	B. V. Nandini Reddy	Won	
Nandi Awards	05 August 2011	Best Actress	Nithya Menen	Won	
