= Natholi Oru Cheriya Meenalla =

- Theatrical release poster
- Directed by: V. K. Prakash
- Written by: Shankar Ramakrishnan
- Produced by: Aji Medayil; Joe Kaithamattam; Christi Kaithamattam
- Starring: Fahadh Faasil; Kamalinee Mukherjee; Rima Kallingal; P. Balachandran; Aishwarya; Govind Padmasoorya
- Cinematography: Arun James
- Edited by: Mahesh Narayanan
- Music by: Abhijit Shylanath
- Production companies: Good Company & Angel Works
- Distributed by: Trends Adfilm Makers
- Release date: 8 March 2013
- Running time: 118 minutes
- Country: India
- Language: Malayalam

Natholi Oru Cheriya Meenalla (transl. Anchovy Isn't a Small Fish) is a 2013 Indian Malayalam-language romantic comedy film directed by V. K. Prakash and written by Shankar Ramakrishnan. Starring Fahadh Faasil in dual roles and Kamalinee Mukherjee. Principal photography began on 22 November 2012 and wrapped by February 2013. The film is scripted by Shankar Ramakrishnan. The film released on 8 February 2013.The film is loosely based on director's Freaky Chakra.

== Plot ==
Preman is the caretaker of a flat at Kochi, in Alwaye. Everyone in the flat calls him 'Natholi'. He faces some unfortunate events in the flat and begins to write a story with the same characters in his real life and plays with their lives in his story. The film revolves around the story of the conflict between Preman and the character he creates. He gradually loses control over the character he creates and it begins to act on its own. The rest of the movie is a display of Preman trying to wrest back control of his character and the ensuing plot twists.

== Cast ==
- Fahadh Faasil in a dual role as:
  - Preman
  - Narendran
- Kamalinee Mukherjee as Prabha Thomas
- Rima Kallingal as Annie
- Govind Padmasurya as Moby
- P. Balachandran
- Aishwarya as Zeenath/ Lakshmi
- Mukundhan as Vasu
- Jayan
- Chinnu Kuruvilla
- Sathaar as Capt. Geethakrishnan
- Krishna Praba as Kumari
- Mridul Nair
- Nandu
- V. K. Sreeraman as himself
- Kani Kusruti as Flat resident
- Joju George as Chicken merchant
- Krishna as Dr.Krishna IAS

== Reception ==
The film opened to mixed reviews from critics. Sify.com says "Natholi Oru Cheriya Meenalla is witty and hooks you straight into the narrative with its inherent charm. It's not at all like what you have seen in Malayalam before and it is imperative to applaud the sincerity of the makers. Don't miss this one, if you have an eye for the unconventional."

Paresh C Palicha of Rediff.com says that "Natholi Oru Cheriya Meenalla has to be watched for its wackiness and unadulterated laughter. Don't miss it."

Veeyen of Nowrunning.com wrote 'Natholi' isn't a consistently enjoyable film that you would fall in love with over the weekend. It does prod your thoughts however, and keeps you intellectually engaged. Small fish it certainly ain't; but then, it ain't really big fish either.

Smitha of Oneindia.in says that "You might or might not like Natholi Oru Cheriya Meenalla, but watch it for something different than usual."
