= Rockstar (2015 film) =

- Theatrical release poster
- Directed by: V. K. Prakash
- Story by: Rajashree Balaram
- Produced by: P.K Ratheesh
- Starring: Siddharth Menon; Eva Pavithran
- Cinematography: Loganathan Srinivasan
- Music by: Prashant Pillai
- Release date: 3 December 2015
- Running time: 134 minutes
- Country: India
- Language: Malayalam

Rockstar is a 2015 Malayalam romantic comedy film directed by V. K. Prakash and produced by P. K. Ratheesh. Sidharth Menon made his debut as the lead, title role, and also co-produced the film under Build Block Productions. Lokanathan did the cinematography and Prashant Pillai scored the music. The story and script were written by Rajashree Balaram.

== Cast ==
- Siddharth Menon as Ananth Abraham
- Eva Pavithran as Athira Menon
- Anumol as Sanjana Kurien
- Poornima as Gayathri
- Prakash Bare as Narendran
- Krishnachandran as Vakkachan
- M. Jayachandran as Guru
- Mallika Sukumaran as Alice
- Mridul Nair
- Mukundan as Abraham / George
- Dinesh Prabhakar as Rarichan
- Divya Darshan
- Romanch as Singer
- Adil Ibrahim as Michael
- Saiju Kurup
- Praseedha as Meenamma
- Sona Nair as Mariya
- Shani
- Sneha as Doctor
- Sreelatha Namboothiri as Valiyamma, Guru's Mother
- Divya Padmini as Vani (cameo)
- Shaalin Zoya as Singer (cameo)
- Manjari as Herself (cameo)

== Plot ==
Ananth Abraham is a well known singer in a troupe, always surrounded by female fans who will do everything for him. He stays in Bangalore along with the troupe members. He is introduced to Athira Menon, a designer, during an inaugural function. On the wedding eve of his friend, he spends a night with her. The next day morning, as they wake up they realize that they are not made for each other, so they part ways. A few days later, Athira discovers that she is pregnant. Though she wants to bring up the child, she doesn't wish to marry Ananth. She says the same to her friend Sanjana, an extremely bold bullet motorcycle riding photographer. She gains the confidence of her parents, who have lived separately for the past 28 years but are not yet divorced, and wishes to raise the child alone. On learning from Sanjana that it is his child that Athira is carrying, Ananth decides to marry her, solely to lend his surname to the child and ensure the child will not be termed fatherless. As soon after the naming ceremony is over, they will divorce. He tells his plan to Athira, and she agrees based on some conditions like he should stay in her house after the marriage. Ananth is successful in getting the approval from his parents with the help of Alice, his best friend and grandmother.

They register the marriage in the presence of their parents. At that moment Athira vomits and Ananth's parents realize that she is pregnant. The story then moves to Athira's house where they start developing small feelings for each other besides their fights on silly matters. Athira's childhood friend Micheal arrives and Ananth doesn't feel that much comfortable on seeing their attachment. Athira, his friend and her parents attend the function of Ananth's album release. Ananth's grandmother is admitted to the ICU, and Athira accompanies him to his native village. She likes his hometown. They return, soon it is shown that they both have intense feeling for each other but never confess. Ultimately the time is getting closer, and Athira is admitted to hospital for delivery.

The doctor informs that there is some complication, and unfortunately they will lose their child, which was a boy. A grief-ridden Athira is compiled at times by Ananth. Since long ago, Ananth has been planning for a mega show at Australia, lasting for a year. Both develop some attraction for each other. However they never reveal. When he is about to leave for Australia, Athira tells him that she will file divorce and send the papers to Australia. Ananth is confused by this and asks her to leave the room. He then boards the taxi to the airport. Athira comes running towards him to hand him his forgotten passport and visa. He leaves. Ananth is upset in the car during the journey to the airport. Athira takes it lightly and starts putting on nail polish. Anant keeps on remembering all the moments he had with athira. He becomes so disturbed and he just checks his passport to find a message written on it by Athira. He rushes back home and yells at Athira. It is then revealed that he intentionally left his passport in her room and she wrote the message "come home" on it using nail polish. He yells at her happily for letting him go and they finally get together.

== Production ==
The film, produced by Build Block Productions, was announced a couple of years before it was released on 3 December 2015. The filming began in August 2015 in Bangalore. The film was shot in Pala, Iritty and Bangalore. Though the film had a theme rarely showcased in Malayalam movies, and was narrated well, the film flopped in theatres.
