= 19(1)(a) =

- Poster
- Directed by: Indhu V. S
- Written by: Indhu V. S
- Produced by: Anto Joseph; Neeta Pinto
- Starring: Nithya Menon; Vijay Sethupathi; Indrajith Sukumaran; Indrans; Athulya Ashadam
- Cinematography: Manesh Madhavan
- Music by: Govind Vasantha
- Distributed by: Anto Joseph Film Company; Aanto Mega Media
- Release date: 29 July 2022
- Running time: 108 minutes
- Country: India
- Language: Malayalam

19(1)(a) is a 2022 Indian Malayalam-language drama film written and directed by debutant Indhu V. S. The film stars Nithya Menen, Vijay Sethupathi, and Indrajith Sukumaran. Produced by Anto Joseph and Neeta Pinto, it was film released on Disney+ Hotstar on 29 July 2022 to mixed reviews.

== Synopsis ==
The mundane life of an acquiescent lady (who could be anybody) who is running a photocopy shop goes into a tailspin when a revolutionary writer leaves the manuscript of his unpublished novel with her.

The movie's title references Article 19(1) in the Constitution of India, which guarantees the freedom of speech and expression.

== Cast ==
- Nithya Menen as Unnamed astore proprietor (Penkutty)
- Vijay Sethupathi as Gauri Shankar
- Indrajith Sukumaran as Anand Manmadhan
- Indrans as Mohanan, a police officer
- Srikant Murali as Gangettan
- Bhagath Manuel as Sakhavu Hareendran
- Deepak Parambol as Ismail Ibrahim, police officer
- Abhishek Raveendran
- Athulya Ashadam as Fathima
- Sreelakshmi as Sarojini, Gauri Shankar's sister
- Arya Salim as Jenny Philip
- Divya Gopinath as Manager

== Production ==
19(1)(a) is produced by Anto Joseph Film Company and it marks the directorial debut of Indhu V. S. It also marks the debut of Vijay Sethupathi in Malayalam in a character role. The film's shooting was completed in January 2021.

== Music ==
The music was composed by Govind Vasantha with lyrics by Anwar Ali.

Track listing
| No. | Title | Singer(s) | Length |
|---|---|---|---|
| 1. | "Badharile" | Veetrag | 3:45 |
| 2. | "Paravakal" | Chinmayi Sripada | 3:59 |
| 3. | "Amma" | Instrumental | 1:13 |
| 4. | "Attack" | Instrumental | 1:36 |
| 5. | "Friends" | Instrumental | 1:12 |
| 6. | "Interval" | Instrumental | 2:25 |
| 7. | "Karupp" | Instrumental | 3:53 |
| 8. | "Nithya Daily Life" | Instrumental | 1:49 |
| 9. | "Nithya Intro" | Instrumental | 1:43 |
| 10. | "The Journey" | Instrumental | 2:41 |
| 11. | "The Journey 2" | Instrumental | 1:35 |
| 12. | "The Wait" | Instrumental | 1:11 |
| Total length: | | | 27:02 |

== Release ==
In April 2021, director Indhu V. S. announced that the film would not be having theatrical release due to COVID-19 pandemic and was looking for an OTT release. The film released directly on Disney+ Hotstar on 29 July 2022.

== Critical reception ==
On the review aggregator website Rotten Tomatoes, 100% of 6 critics' reviews are positive, with an average rating of 6.8/10.

Anna M. M. Vetticad of Firstpost rated the film 3.75/5 stars and wrote, "Clarity, courage and a liberal ideology alone do not automatically yield great cinema. What makes 19(1)(a) special is its poetic, relaxed storytelling and alluring, pensive tone." Anjana George of The Times of India rated the film 3.5/5 stars and wrote, "The movie is for buffs who would like to see through cinema, look deep into the elusiveness of the medium and enjoy the beauty of the film in all aspects. Power of words, opinions, experiences and writing should prevail." Sajin Shriijth of Cinema Express gave it 3.5/5 stars and wrote, "Much of 19(1)(a) benefits from a strong sense of minimalism in visuals, sounds, or dialogues."

Lakshmi Priya of The News Minute wrote, "Director Indhu VS has made a daring, promising debut with her unambiguous politics, which is the biggest plus of the film." Aditya Shrikrishna of LiveMint wrote, "19(1)(a) is essentially about how fact and fiction coalesce into a single lifeform no matter how much we try to distinguish them. It’s about the power of words—spoken and written—and how through them we can learn intimately about ourselves first and then others."

Aswin V. N. of The Hindu wrote, "Director Indhu V.S. delivers an engaging coming-of-age story with an important political subtext in her debut Malayalam movie, that explores the freedom of speech and expression". Janani K. of India Today gave it 2/5 stars and wrote, "There are too many sub-plots and most of which do not get any closure. [...] With 19(1)(a), Indhu VS teaches us that noble intentions do not always translate into great scripts." Manoj Kumar R. of The Indian Express gave it 0.5/5 stars and wrote, "Nithya Menen, Vijay Sethupathi, Indrajith Sukumaran and Indrans have delivered a very nuanced performance in the movie, which talks about some heavy emotional and political matters."
