= V. K. Prakash =

Indian film director and actor (born 1960)

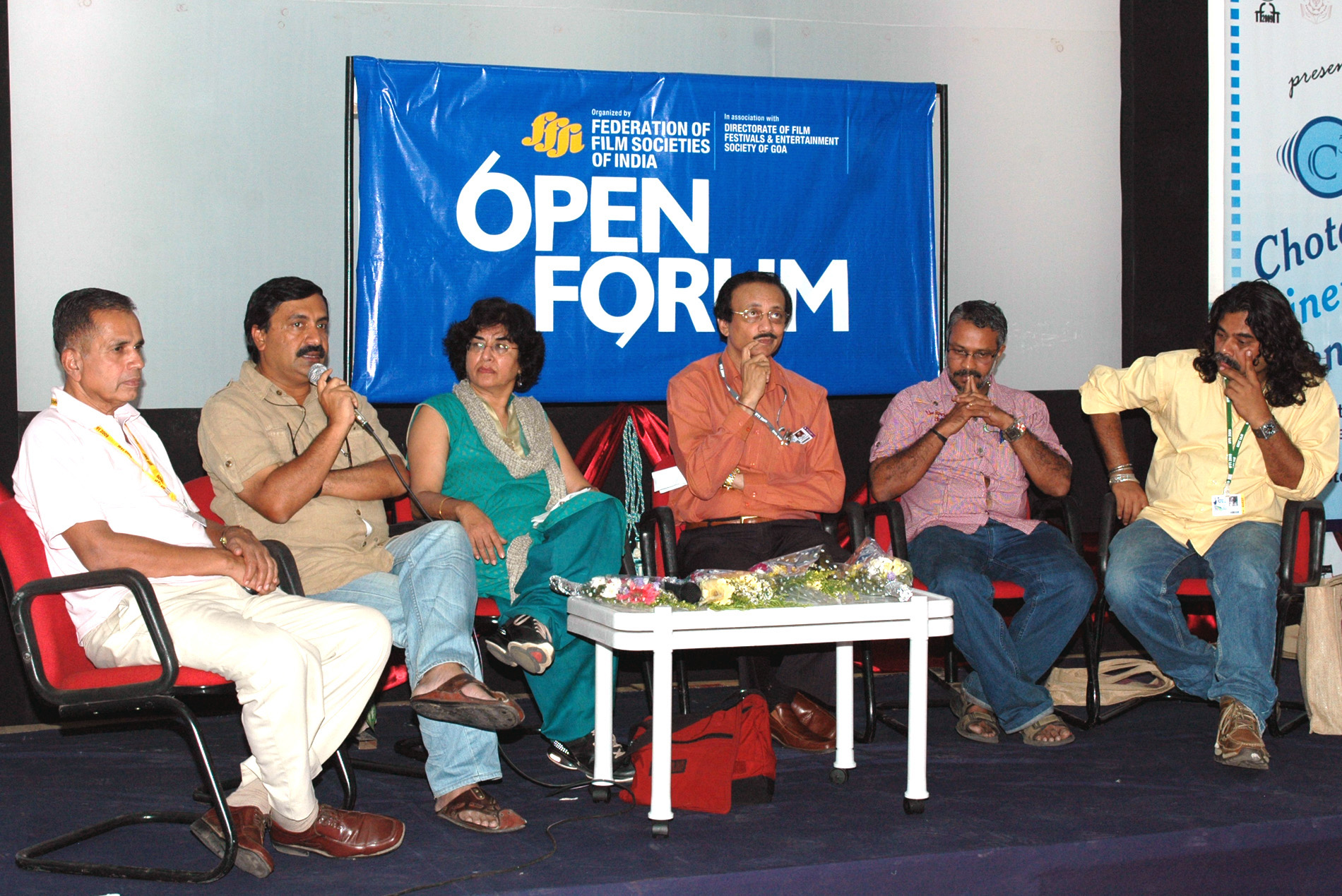
- V. K. Prakash, IFFI (2009)
- Born: 12 October 1960 (age 66); Bombay, Maharashtra, India
- Other name: VKP
- Occupations: Filmmaker; actor
- Years active: 2000–present
- Spouse: Sajitha
- Children: 1

V. K. Prakash (born 12 October 1960) is an Indian film director and actor. He makes films, music videos, and commercials, and works predominantly in Malayalam, but has also directed Telugu, Marathi, Kannada and Hindi films. Prakash's debut feature directorial was Punaradhivasam (2000) which won the National Film Award for Best Feature Film in Malayalam and Kerala State Film Award for Best Debut Director. His film Nirnayakam (2015) won the National Film Award for Best Film on Other Social Issues.

== Early life ==
Born in a Malayali family in Palakkad, and currently based in Bangalore, he runs his own ad film production company called Trends Adfilm Makers Pvt Ltd. He studied in the School of Drama, Thrissur before commencing his career in the ad film industry.

== Career ==
V. K. Prakash started as an advertisement film director and worked in the industry for several years. He directed his debut feature film with Punaradhivasam in 2000, a Malayalam drama which won the National Film Award for Best Feature Film in Malayalam and Kerala State Film Award for Best Debut Director for him. In 2015, he directed the social drama Nirnayakam which won the National Film Award for Best Film on Other Social Issues.

== Personal life ==
He is married to Sajitha. The couple have a daughter Kavya.

== Filmography ==
=== Director ===
List of V. K. Prakash film directing credits
Year	Title	Language	Notes
2000	Punaradhivasam	Malayalam	
2003	Mullavalliyum Thenmavum	Malayalam	
2003	Freaky Chakra	English	
2005	Police	Malayalam	
2006	Moonnamathoral	Malayalam	First high-definition (HD) Malayalam film to be digitally distributed to theatres via satellite.
2008	Positive	Malayalam	
2009	Phir Kabhi	Hindi	DTH premiere
2009	Kavya's Diary	Telugu	
2009	Gulumal: The Escape	Malayalam	
2010	Aidondla Aidu	Kannada	
2011	Three Kings	Malayalam	
2011	Beautiful	Malayalam	
2012	Karmayogi	Malayalam	
2012	Trivandrum Lodge	Malayalam	
2012	Poppins	Malayalam	
2013	Natholi Oru Cheriya Meenalla	Malayalam	
2013	Thank You	Malayalam	
2013	Silence	Malayalam	
2014	Shutter	Marathi	
2015	Nirnnayakam	Malayalam	
2015	Ishqedarriyaan	Hindi	
2015	Rock Star	Malayalam	
2016	Marubhoomiyile Aana	Malayalam	
2017	Careful	Malayalam	
2019	Parchhayee: Ghost Stories by Ruskin Bond	Hindi	ZEE5 originals web series
2019	Praana	Malayalam	
2021	Erida	Malayalam, Tamil	Bilingual film; Amazon Prime Video exclusive
2022	Oruthee	Malayalam	
2022	Half Pants Full Pants	Hindi	Amazon Prime Video series
2023	Live	Malayalam	
2024	Kaagaz 2	Hindi	
2024	Paalum Pazhavum	Malayalam	
2025	Vishnu Priya	Kannada	

=== Actor ===
Year	Title	Role	Notes
2015	Anarkali	Dr. David	Cameo
2015	100 Days of Love	Chief Editor	
2015	Vidhooshakan		
2016	Marubhoomiyile Aana		
2016	Kali	Siddharth's father	
2017	Sakhavu	Mathew	
2017	Adventures of Omanakuttan		
2018	Ente Mezhuthiri Athazhangal	Anthony Orikkyalpattu	
2018	B.Tech	Jayaram	
2018	Kuttanadan Marpappa	Peter's father	
2018	Krishnam		
2018	Parole	Krishnan Nair	
2019	Manoharam	Rahul's father	
2019	Lucifer	Doctor	
2019	Mikhael	Psychiatrist Charles Tharakan	
2021	The Priest	Surendran	
2022	Theerppu	DGP Mathew Jacob	
2022	Aquarium		
2023	Queen Elizabeth	Simon	
2024	Bazooka		
2026	Law and Order	Joshuva Yohan	

== Awards ==
National Film Awards

- 2000: Best Feature Film in Malayalam – Punaradhivasam
- 2015: Best Film on Other Social Issues – Nirnayakam

Kerala State Film Awards

- 2000: Best Debut Director – Punaradhivasam

== Controversy ==
On 26 August 2024, a woman scriptwriter accused that V K Prakash sexually abused her after inviting her to his room in a hotel in Kollam to discuss a film project on 4 April 2022.

== Frequent collaborators ==
VKP is noted for his particular association with certain actors or using the actors in more of his directorial ventures.

Films	Kunchacko Boban	Jayasurya	Indrajith	Ouseppachan (Music)	Anoop menon	Honey Rose	Meghna Raj	Ratheesh Vegha (Music)
Mullavalliyum Thenmavum	X mark		X mark	X mark				
Police			X mark	X mark				
Moonnamathoral				X mark				
Positive		X mark						
Gulumal-The Escape	X mark	X mark						
Three Kings	X mark	X mark	X mark	X mark				
Karmayogi			X mark	X mark				
Beautiful		X mark			X mark	X mark	X mark	
Trivandrum Lodge		X mark			X mark	X mark		
Poppins	X mark	X mark	X mark			X mark	X mark	
Thank You		X mark						
Nirnnayakam				X mark				
Mazhaneerthullikal				X mark				
