= Anoop Sankar =

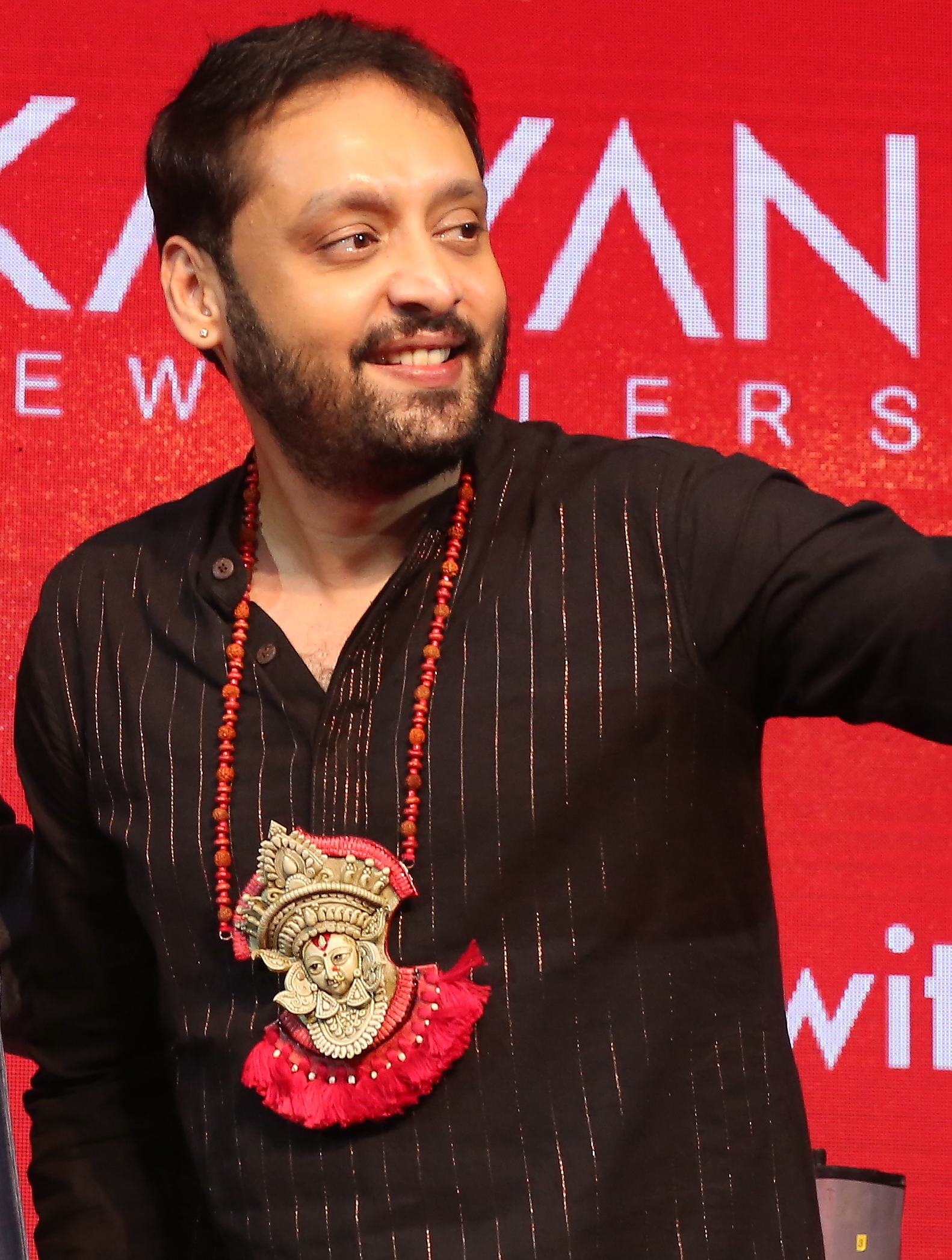

Background information
- Born: 22 May 1979 (age 47); Kottayam, Kerala, India
- Genre: Indian classical music Indian Film Music
- Occupations: Playback Singer, Classical Singer
- Years active: 2003–present
- Awards: Vibgyor Award (2010); Frame Media Award (2010)

Anoop Sankar (born 22 May 1979) was an Indian film playback singer, songwriter, stage performer, VJ, RJ and media personality.

== Early life and family ==
Anoop Sankar was born on 22 May 1979 into a family of music lovers, as the eldest son of T. A. Sankar and Latha Sankar who are ardent music lovers. Latha Sankar is a trained classical vocalist and the winner of Kerala University classical music competition. Anoop was initiated into Carnatic classical music learning at the age of six under the guidance of Sri. Chalappuram Pappa, under whom he learnt for 12 years. After completing his graduation, he moved to Chennai where he continued his learning under the renowned musician Neyveli Santhanagopalan. Anoop Sankar after completing his MCT & Master of Engineering chose to pursue his career in Music. He married Viji Viswanathan in 2009. Viji is a playback singer and a songwriter .

== Career ==
Anoop Sankar came into limelight after winning the 2002 edition of the popular musical talent hunt Sapthaswarangal telecast in Sun TV. In the same year, on 21 and 22 September, Anoop along with 20 musicians under the name "Sangamam" set the Guinness World Records for the longest musical performance spanning over 40 hours at the Santhome Monfort School Auditorium, Chennai. He has performed extensively across the globe with legends like Dr. S. P. Balasubrahmanyam, Shankar Mahadevan, Hariharan, K. S. Chithra, Sujatha Mohan, Sadhana Sargam and Anuradha Sriram.

Anoop Sankar is a popular media personality having an experience of more than a decade. He has been a part of more than 1500 episodes of various television and radio shows of South Indian media as Judge, Host and Music mentor.

In 2003, he started working with the renowned music director Gopi Sundar and he was associated with him for more than 100 commercials of leading brands as a singer and a writer. Later he Sang for the movies of National Award-winning music directors like Ouseppachan, Vidyasagar, M. Jayachandran & Biji bal. Anoop's biggest hit came through the Musical single "Kurutham Kettavan" which was written and composed by Hariprasad and performed by National award-winning actor Suraj Venjaramoodu and Popular VJ Ranjini Haridas. He also got wide appreciation for the challenging classical song "Chandrachooda" composed by Navneeth Sundar from the movie Karmayogi.

Anoop made his debut in Tamil playback singing through Yuvan Shankar Raja musical "Agarram" and into Tulu films in the year 2015 through the song "Ora Oppi Bokka" for the movie "Dhand" composed by Abhishek SN. Anoop was also the Model for the brands Kalyan Sarees and Vishraam Builders and he did a cameo in the Malayalam Movie Vaadhyar.He is also the founder and creative head of AUM – Academy of Universal Music at Thrissur which was launched in the year 2016.

Anoop Sankar's Musical video of the Diwali celebrations hosted by Kalyan Jewellers in presence of legends Amitabh Bachchan, Sachin Tendulkar, Nagarjuna, Mammooty, Nivin Pauly, Manju Warrier, Prabhu, Jayaram, Hariharan, Sujata and Shweta Mohan became popular and has a viewership of more than 10 million across various pages in Social media. His Annual Charitable Musical event The Anoop Sankar Experience has been happening in Calicut Music Circle for a decade now. This is the tenth year of the show which spans over six hours featuring evergreen melodies in various languages and genres. Anoop also performed along with Shah Rukh Khan at Dubai in an exclusive musical event where Anoop rendered the legendary songs performed by Shah Rukh Khan. He also did an exclusive musical event in Mumbai attended by the Mukesh Ambani Family. He also performed a Unique Musical on 10 November 2019 at Calicut as a part of 10th Edition of Anoop Sankar Experience hosted by Calicut Music Circle. Anoop performed a Musical Tribute to the Maestro Isaignani Ilaiyaraja by singing 105 songs of him for 11 Hours non-stop. This fete is all set to enter the Record Books where only One Composers songs has been performed by One Singer for the longest duration.

Anoop Sankar also had a rare opportunity to perform for the prime minister of India Narendra Modi at Thrissur. Anoop rendered the inaugural welcome song written about the prime minister of India.

== Filmography ==
=== As playback singer ===
Year	Film	Song	Music director	Co–singer
2003	Choonda	Thayirkudam	Mohan Sithara	Solo
2004	Viralthumbil Aaro	Avaniyil Azha Kezhum	Job Kuruvilla	Solo
2004	Viralthumbil Aaro	Chadapadapada	Job Kuruvilla	Afsal, Rimi Tomy
2005	Kochi Rajavu	Thankakutta	Vidyasagar	Sujata Mohan
2005	Police	Ninnil Nizhalay	Ouseppachan	K. S. Chithra
2005	Police	Oru Manvilakkin	Ouseppachan	K. S. Chithra, Franco, Balu thankachan
2005	Sukran	Title Song	Vijay Antony	Renjith, Jaidev
2007	Agaram	Adaadaa Adadaa	Yuvan Shankar Raja	Harini
2007	Agaram	Unnai Naan Parthen	Yuvan Shankar Raja	Mahalakshmi Iyer
2008	Positive	Enthininnu Mizhineer	Alex Paul	Franco, Ramesh babu
2009	Gulumaal	Gulumaal	Manu Ramesan	Roshan, Ajay sathyan
2009	Gulumaal	Tham Tharikida	Manu Ramesan	Salim Kumar, G. Venugopal, Vidhu pratap
2011	Three Kings	Chakkaramaavin	Ouseppachan	Shweta Mohan
2011	Three Kings	Once Up On A Time	Ouseppachan	Jerry John
2011	Three Kings	Engine Njaan	Ouseppachan	Franco
2011	Three Kings	Chakkaramaavin	Ouseppachan	Swetha Mohan
2011	Bangkok Summer	Chakkaramaavin	Ouseppachan	Jyotsna Franco
2012	Karmayogi	Sivam Sivakaram	Ouseppachan	Solo
2012	Karmayogi	Chandrachooda	Navneeth Sundar	Solo
2012	Da Thadiya	Maveli Née	Bijibal	Bijibal
2012	Poppins	Valam Nadannu	Ratheesh Vegha	Manjari
2012	Raattinam	Yakkai Sutrum	Manu Ramesan	Bhavyalakshmi
2012	Raattinam	Yethu Yethu	Manu Ramesan	Jassie Gift
2012	Vaadhyar	Vaa Vaa Vadhyare	Rinil Gowtham	Kids chorus
2012	Friday	Nlaavay Pookum	Roby Abraham	Solo track
2015	Ettuthikkum Madhayaanai	Asanthuputtene	Manu Ramesan	Solo track
2015	Ettuthikkum Madhayaanai	Nellai Cheemayithu	Manu Ramesan	Santosh hariharan, Sannidhanandan
2015	Ettuthikkum Madhayaanai	Ettu Thikkum Madha Yaanai	Manu Ramesan	K.S. Thangasami
2015	Dhand	Ora Oppi Bokka	Abhishek SN	Pushpanjali Suchi
2015	Ee Manjil Virinja Pookal	Karalukatoru	Jeevan Nandan	Jyotsna
2015	Manal Naharam	Manasil Mazhayay	Rinil gowtham	Sithara
2015	Parayanirunathu	Doore Doore	Hariprasad	Reshma Satish
2015	Passion	Iravil Ethayo	Manu Ramesan	Solo track
2015	Nirnayakam	Ilaveyil Chirakumay	M. Jayachandran	Chimayi Sriprada

=== As lyricst ===
Year	Song	Movie	Composer	Singer
2011	Once Upon A Time	Three Kings	Ouseppachan	Anoop Sankar, Jerry John
2012	Chandrachooda	Karmayogi	Navneeth Sundar	Anoop Sankar
2015	Neelavaan Mukile	Ayal Njanalla	Manu Ramesan	Job kurian, Sithara, Vidhu Pratap, Soorya Narayanan, Nawas
2015	Iravil Ethayo	Passion	Manu Ramesan	Anoop Sankar

=== Television ===
Year	Show Name	Channel	Role
2006	Music Carnival	Asianet Plus	Host
2006	VJ plus	Asianet Plus	Host
2006	Star Singer	Asianet	Team lead & Mentor
2007	Limelight	Asianet	Host
2008	Vodafone Thakadhimi	Asianet	Host
2009	Star Singer	Asianet	Mentor
2010	Musical Chair	Asianet Plus	Host
2011	Junior Idol	Jaihind TV	Host
2012	Junior Idol	Jaihind TV	Judge
2013	Super star	Amrita TV	Groomer
2014	Television and Film awards	Various channels	As Host and Performer
2015	Puzha	Media One TV	Host
2016	Puzha	Media One TV	Host
2016	Super Star Junior	Amrita TV	Consultant
2016	Music Mojo Season 4	Kappa TV	Band name: Anoop Sankar and Navneeth Sundar Trio
2020	Super 4 Season 2	Mazhavil Manorama	Groomer

== Awards and honors ==
- Member and lead male singer of the band "Sangamam" which created Guinness World Records in the year 2002 for the longest musical performance spanning 40 hours
- Frame media award for best singer for his single "Kurutham kettavan" in 2010
- Vibgyor award for the best single "Kurtham Kettavan" in 2010.
