= Dhand =

- Directed by: Ranjith Bajpe
- Written by: Ranjith Bajpe
- Produced by: Shodhan Prasad
- Starring: Arjun Kapikad; Sandeep Shetty; Anoop Sagar; Deepak Paladka; Shilpa Suvarna; Anvita Sagar
- Cinematography: Karthik Mallur
- Edited by: Sujith Nayak
- Music by: Abhishek S N
- Production company: Sandhya Creations
- Release date: 29 May 2015
- Country: India
- Language: Tulu

Dhand (English: Army) is a Tulu film directed by Ranjith Bajpe and produced by Shodhan Prasad under the banner of Sandhya Creations. It stars Arjun Kapikad, Sandeep Shetty, Anoop Sagar, Deepak Paladka, Gopinath Bhat, Umesh Mijar, Ranjan Boloor, Shilpa Suvarna, Anvitha Sagar, and Subhash Bangera in the lead roles.

This was the first Tulu movie to be released in Australia, United Kingdom and Israel.

== Synopsis ==
Inspired by actual events, Dhand is an account of one man's heroism in a battle against evil and injustice that antagonizes his loved ones.

== Cast ==
- Arjun Kapikad
- Sandeep Shetty
- Anoop Sagar
- Deepak Paladka
- Gopinath Bhat
- Pradeep Chandra Kuthpadi
- Umesh Mijar
- Ranjan Boloor
- Subhash Bangera
- Shilpa Suvarna
- Anvitha Sagar
- Nidhi Maroli
- Manju Rai Muloor
- Sudhakar Kudroli
- Shwetha Surathkal
- Riya Palekar
- Sundeep Malani (Guest Appearance)
- Shodhan Prasad
- Ameeta Kulal (Special Appearance)
- Lakshman Mallur
- Mack Matrai
- Shwetha Surathkal
- Varsha Karanth
- Parvathi Sasihitlu
- Sowmya
- ShashiKumar Tadambail
- Manohar Surathkal
- Charan
- Chethak

== Production ==
Dhand is the second film released by Sandhya Creations. Following his success with Nirel, Ranjith Bajpe was chosen to direct. Early on in the project, Sudhakar Kudroli was appointed as executive producer. The lead role was assigned to Arjun Kapikad, and Sandeep Shetty, who had met Ranjith in Dubai when he attended the Bale Telipale program, was also brought on board. Deepak Paladka, winner of the "Bale Telipale" reality TV show in Dubai, was chosen for a key role in the movie. Other stars, notably Shilpa Suvarna, Anvitha Sagar, and Nidhi Maroli, were selected following auditions in Mangalore. Dhand has three female characters, whose costumes were a major consideration. Surakshitha Shetty was appointed costume designer, becoming the first female in the Tulu film industry to take on that role. Deepak Paladka was subsequently appointed to market the movie.

Filming got under way at Sri Sharavu Maha Ganapati Temple, Mangalore, on 14 January 2015, and took 37 days. On-site editing was performed by Sujith Nayak, and the dialogue editing took a total of 30 days to complete.

The romantic "Nina Teliken," sung by Sonu Nigam, was filmed over fours days at various scenic locations in and around Mangalore. The filming sought to encapsulate three aspects of Mother Nature: greenery, water, and drought. Director Ranjith Bajpe, working with Anoop Sagar and Surakshitha Shetty, choreographed the song. A wedding song, "Ora Oppi Bokka," was shot at night in a traditional house near Yekkar, Mangalore. It features Sandeep Shetty and Anvitha Sagar and was choreographed by Akul N. The introductory song, "Hero Yaanavodu," featuring Arjun Kapikad, was shot near Panambur and was also choreographed by Akul N. The sensuous song "Gammathu," featuring Anoop Sagar and Ameeta Kulal, was filmed at night at the Red Rock Resort near Surathkal Mangalore.

All of Dhand's action scenes were directed by Sandalwood stunt master Ultimate Shivu, who was also responsible for the stunt work in Ugramm.

== Soundtrack ==
The film's soundtrack is by Abhishek S N, a software engineer from Bangalore, who composed music for another Tulu film, Nire. He was assisted by Swapnil H Digde, who served as the arranger. "Ninna Teliken".

Sr. No.	Song name	Music director	Singer	Lyrics
01	Hero Yaanavodu	Abhishek SN	Abhishek SN	UY Ravichandran Sonadoor
02	Nina Telikenu	Abhishek SN	Sonu Nigam	Loku Kudla
03	Ora Oppibokka	Abhishek SN	Anoop Sankar, Pushpanjali Suchi	Rajneesh Amin
04	Mounada Baduke	Abhishek SN	Abhishek SN | Pushpanjali Suchi	Rajneesh Amin
05	Gammath Gammath	Abhishek SN	Akanksha Badami	Loku Kudla
