= Gulumaal: The Escape =

- Promotional poster
- Directed by: V. K. Prakash
- Written by: Y. V. Rajesh
- Produced by: Sajitha Prakash
- Starring: Kunchacko Boban; Jayasurya
- Cinematography: Fowzia Fathima
- Edited by: Mahesh Narayanan
- Music by: Manu Ramesan
- Distributed by: A&M Marketing Company
- Release date: 4 December 2009
- Country: India
- Language: Malayalam

Gulumaal: The Escape is a 2009 Indian Malayalam-language comedy film directed by V. K. Prakash and written by Rajesh Y. V. It was shot in digital format by cinematographer Fowzia Fathima, and starred Kunchacko Boban and Jayasurya. The film is an unofficial remake of the Argentine crime-thriller film Nine Queens. The film was remade in Telugu as All the Best (2012).

== Plot ==
Jerry Mathews is a con man known for his high-stakes scams. His criminal actions create a rift in his family when he attempts to steal the family business from his sister. While planning a heist on a petrol station, Jerry helps an escaped convict, Ravi Varma. Ravi had been caught performing similar heists with a similar con man.

Ravi convinces Jerry to plan a formidable heist. An old acquaintance, Bose, tells Jerry of a forged painting that can be used to con a non-resident Indian (NRI) out of ₹50 lakhs. The information creates a rift in the newly formed friendship as both Ravi and Jerry attempt to outdo each other in order to take the money.

Coincidentally, Jerry's sister Saira is an employee at the hotel where the NRI is staying, and both Ravi and the NRI fall in love with her.

Ravi and Jerry eventually lose the painting and decide to buy the original by pooling their money. They then sell it to the NRI for ₹3 crore. However, Jerry's father finds out about the plot and tells Saira, which further drives the siblings apart.

When Jerry and Ravi realize that the check given to them is invalid, they fight and decide to part ways. Jerry runs into the master con man, Bose, who offers to help him resolve the situation, and takes Jerry to the wedding of Ravi's and Saira's. Jerry learns that the entire sequence of events, starting from the gas station incident, had been completely staged as a form of gentle revenge in return for the scam that had sent Ravi's father Prabhakaran to jail.

Jerry asks for forgiveness from everyone and leaves the wedding. As the credits roll, Jerry is seen pondering another scam.

== Cast ==
- Kunchacko Boban as Ravi Varma
- Jayasurya as Jerry Mathews
- Suraj Venjaramoodu as SI Shambhu
- Mithra Kurian as Saira Mathews
- Nedumudi Venu as Prabhakara Varma
- Salim Kumar as Bhai
- Bijukuttan as Constable Vasu
- Kottayam Nazeer as Appi Biju
- Devan as NRI
- Maniyanpilla Raju as Rangaswami / Ahammedkutty
- Poojappura Radhakrishnan as Sharmaji
- Gita Nair as Ravi's mother
- Abhirami Suresh as Ravi's sister
- Roslin as Jerry's mother
- Valsala Menon as Thampuratty
- Samvrutha Sunil as herself (cameo)
- Siddique as himself (cameo)
- Chali Pala
- Deepika Mohan
- Vimal Roshan

== Reception ==
The film was described as being similar to Fabián Bielinsky's 2000 Argentine crime drama film Nine Queens (Nueve Reinas). V. K. Prakash said: "I discovered the Nine Queens connection only after I liked the subject of Gulumaal".

Sify.com stated that "with a tighter script, better music and lesser length the film could have been even more entertaining", but added, "The best thing about the film could be its unconventional narrative style." Indiaglitz.com called it "stylish and crazy entertainment", praising the film's "intense believability" and "unstoppable flow of brilliantly witty one-liners", but criticized the poor selection of voices in Manu Rameshan's songs. VN of Nowrunning.com gave the film 2.5 out of 5, praising "the amazing camaraderie that its lead actors share" but finding fault with the "cacophony" and substandard picturization of the songs. VN also stated that Gulumal was "a straight lift off the Argentinian film Nueve Reinas (Nine Queens)".

=== Box office ===
The film was a commercial success.

== Soundtrack ==
The film's soundtrack contains 4 songs, all composed by Manu Ramesan, with lyrics by S. Ramesan Nair and Saimon Palvaay.

#	Title	Singer(s)
1	"Gulumaal Gulumaal"	Anoop Sankar, Ajay Sathyan, Roshan
2	"Thaam Tharikida"	G. Venugopal, Vidhu Prathap, Anoop Sankar
3	"Vennila"	P. Jayachandran
4	"Kilu Kilukkam"	Sithara Krishnakumar
