= Sithara (singer) =

Indian singer, composer, and dancer

Sithara Krishnakumar
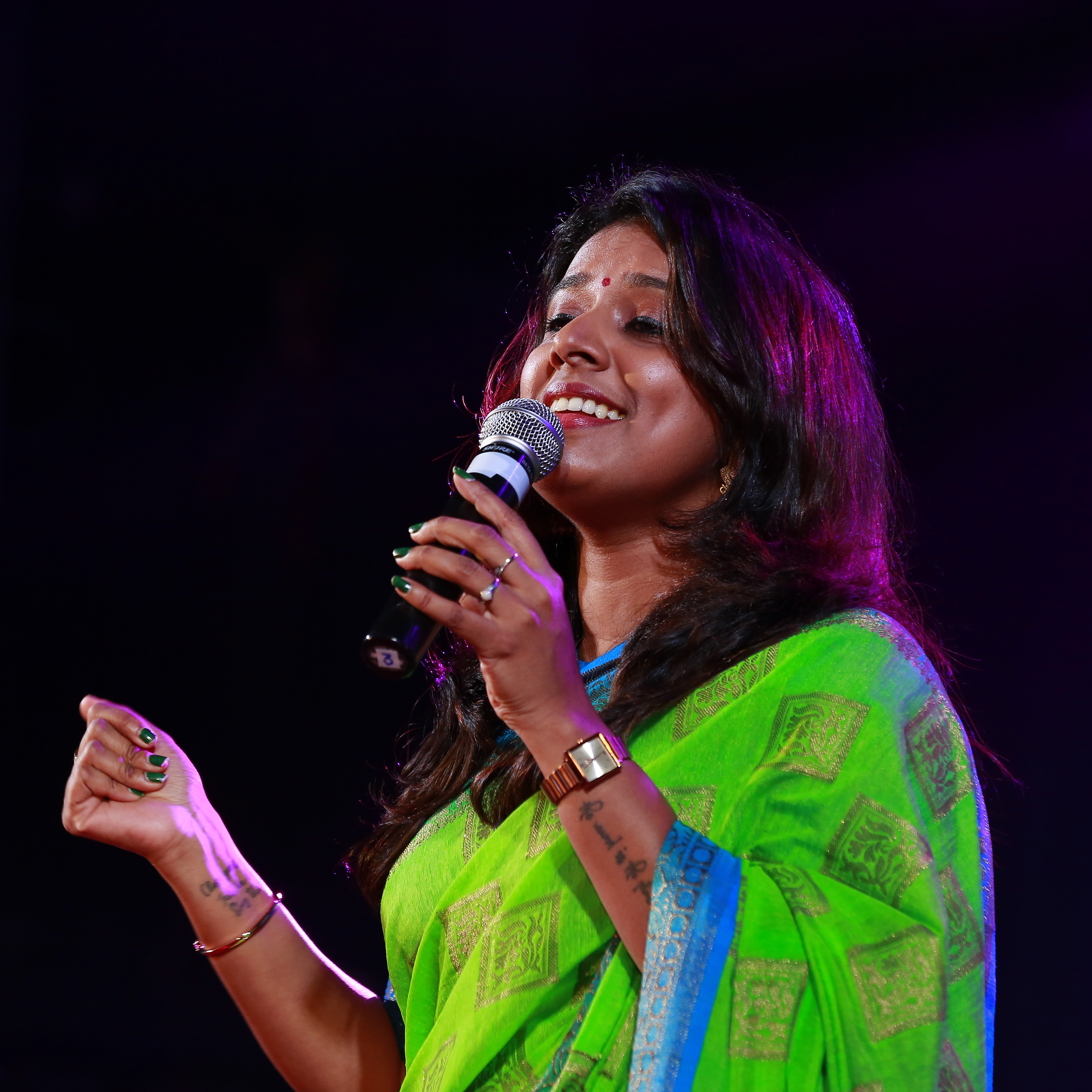

Background information
- Also known as: Sithumani
- Born: Malappuram,Vengara , Kerala, India
- Occupations: Playback singer; music director; actor
- Years active: 2007–present
- Spouse: Dr. M Sajish
- Musical career
- Genres: Folk; Indian classical; Ghazal
- Website: sithara.in

Sithara Krishnakumar is an Indian playback singer, composer, lyricist, classical dancer and an occasional actor. She predominantly works in Malayalam cinema in addition to Tamil, Telugu and Kannada films. Sithara is a well known singer who is trained in Hindustani and Carnatic classical music traditions and is also a recognised ghazal singer. She is the recipient of several awards which includes three Kerala State Film Award for Best Female Playback Singer.

She travels extensively and has performed in concerts and stage shows across the world. Folk and fusion being her other areas of interest. She has collaborated with various popular musical bands in Kerala as well as collaborated in many stage shows, which includes international shows as well. In 2014, she formed a musical band Eastraga, which focuses on a mix of female oriented songs backed by a team of renowned musicians. She is also part of the 6-member band named Sithara's Project Malabaricus, an independent venture which features contemporarised folk and classical songs.

== Early life ==
Sithara was born at Vengara in Malappuram district of Kerala to K. M. Krishnakumar and Saly. Her mother is a Catholic. Born into a family inclined to classical arts, Sithara was introduced to the world of music as a child and started singing at the early age of four.

Sithara attended St. Paul's School, Tenhipalam, GMHSS Calicut University Campus School, and NNM Higher Secondary School, Chelembra. She did her graduation in English literature from Farook College, Kozhikode, and pursued her first master's degree in English Literature from the Calicut University campus, and later completed a second Master's degree in Hindustani Khyal Music from Rabindra Bharati University in Kolkata.

Sithara married Dr. Sajish M., a cardiologist, on 31 August 2007, and the couple has a daughter, Saawan Rithu, born on 9 June 2013. The family resides in Aluva, Ernakulam.

== Career ==
She started off her art life as a dancer and eventually became a playback singer. She was trained in Carnatic Music by Sri Ramanattukara Satheesan Master and Palai CK Ramachandran. Sithara also received extensive education in Hindustani Classical music from Ustad Fiyaz Khan. She is also a classical dancer trained by Kalamandalam Vinodini. For her multifaceted talents, she was accoladed with the Kalathilakam title in Calicut University Arts Festival for two consecutive years (2005 and 2006). She holds master's degrees in Hindustani Khyal Music and Vocal Music from Rabindra Bharati University, Kolkata.

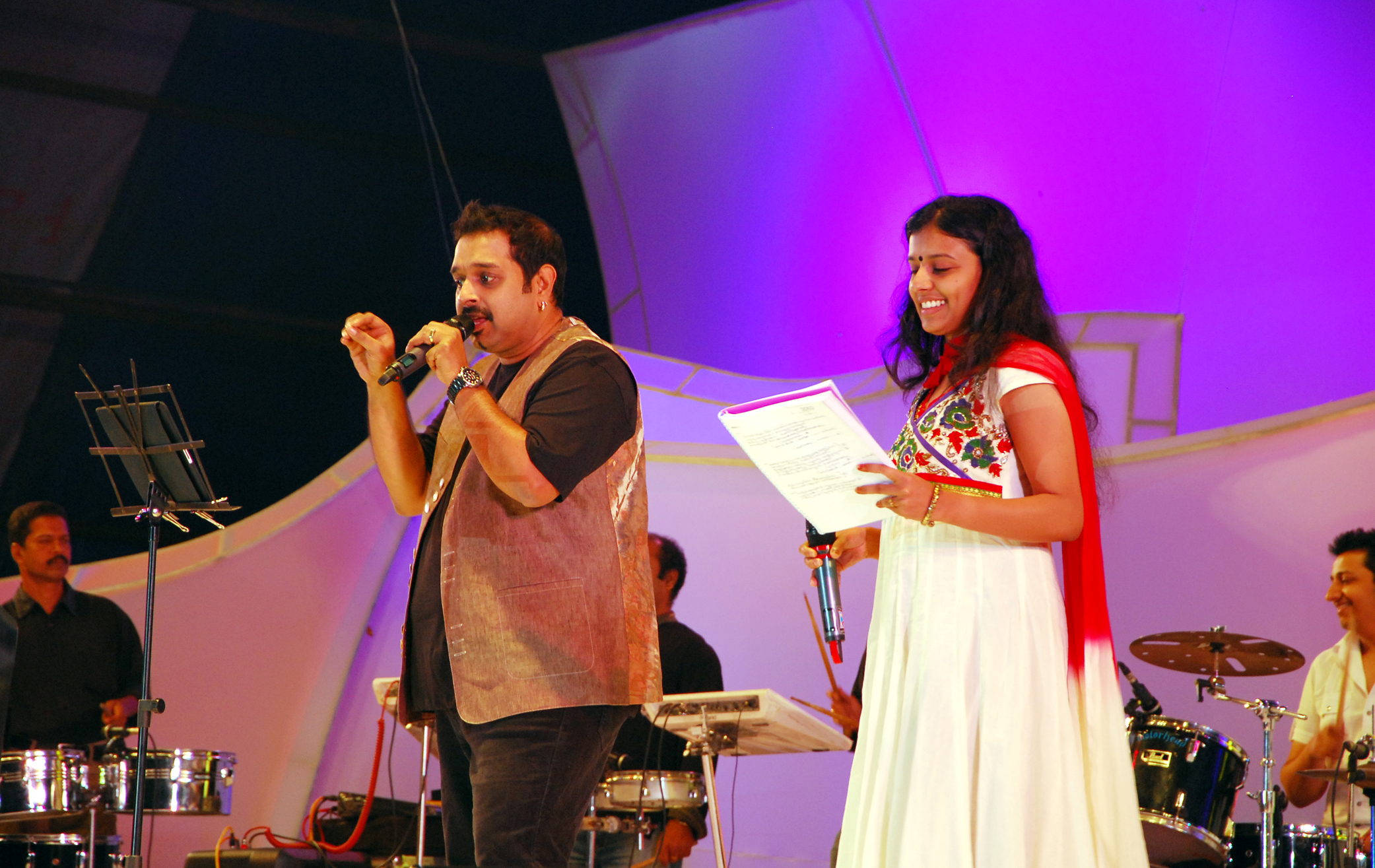
Sithara performing with Shankar Mahadevan at Wayanad Maholsavam 2012

Sithara started off her playback singing career in the year 2007 with the song Pammi Pammi in Vinayan's Malayalam film Athishayan. Formerly, she was the winner of several musical talent shows like Asianet Saptha Swarangal (2004), Kairali TV Gandharva Sangeetham (Seniors) and Jeevan TV Voice 2004. She also won Jeevan TV's 20 million Apple Megastars in 2008. She has gained a good reputation as a devoted Ghazal singer and a passionate stage performer of other vocal genres. She has worked with noted composers like Ouseppachan, M. Jayachandran, G. V. Prakash Kumar, Prashant Pillai, Gopi Sundar, Bijibal, Shaan Rahman and rendered her voice to over 300 film songs including Malayalam and other Indian languages. Her works are of various genres.

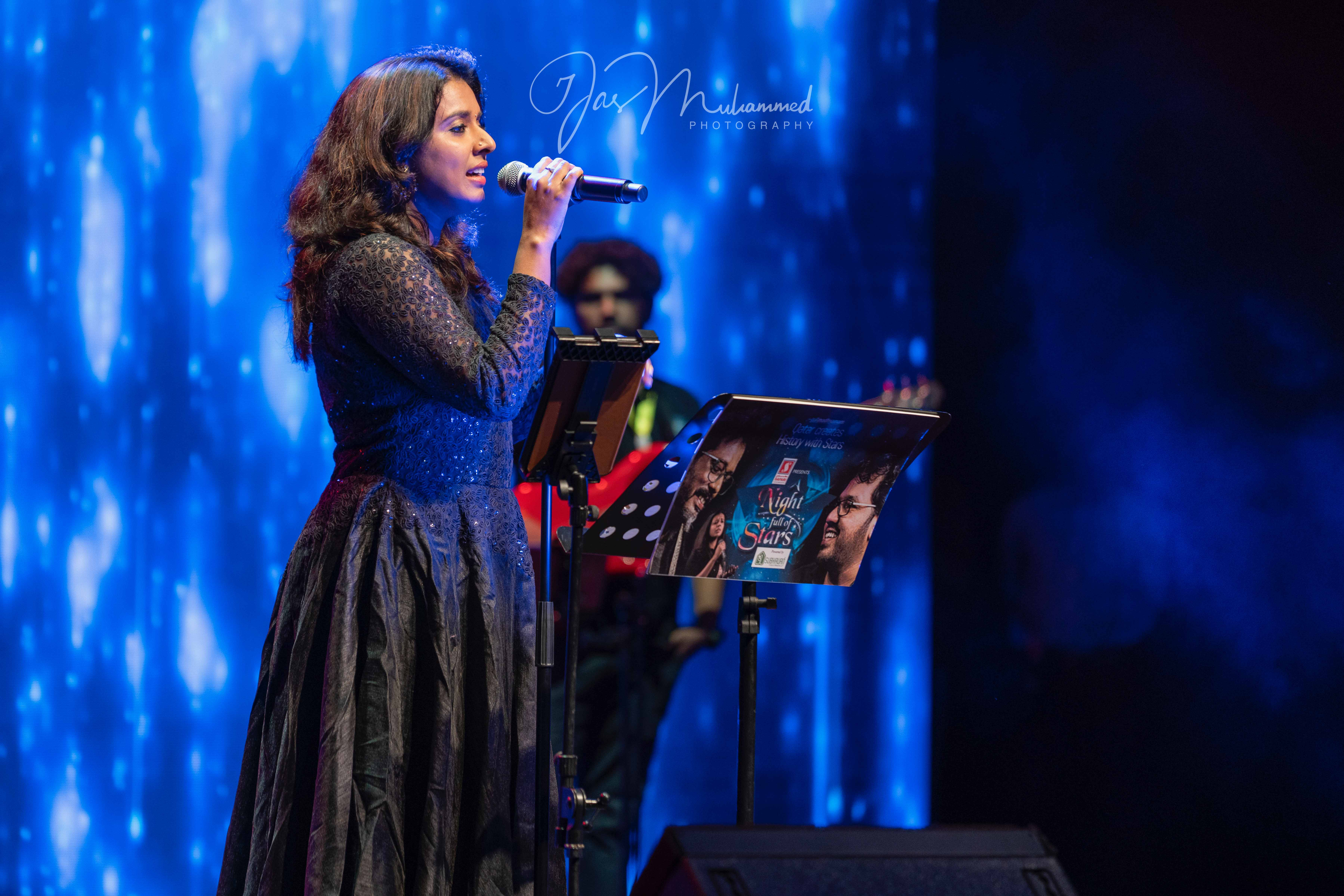
Sithu Performing at Qatar in 2019

In 2017, she turned composer with the single Ente Akasham, Written by herself. The video which officially got released at a program held by Kerala State Women's Development Corporation to commemorate International Women's Day, picturized the life of night-time female workers.

She turned film music composer with the film Udalaazham along with Mithun Jayaraj. The film is produced under the banner Doctor’s Dilemma – a doctor's collective which includes her husband Dr. Sajish. M. She made a cameo appearance in the Malayalam film Ganagandharvan directed by Ramesh Pisharody.

On October 31, 2025, the Government of Kerala appointed Sithara as a member of the General Council of the Kerala State Chalachitra Academy.

== Awards and honours ==
| Year | Award | Category | Work / Song | Notes | Ref |
|---|---|---|---|---|---|
| 2012 | Kerala State Film Award | Best Singer | "Enundodee" – Celluloid | | |
| 2017 | Kerala State Film Award | Best Singer | "Vaanamakalunnuvo" – Vimaanam | | |
| 2025 | JFW Movie Awards | Best Playback Singer | "Oru Chillupaathram" – Vivekanandan Viralaanu | Malayalam | |
| 2025 | Flowers Music Awards | Band of the Year | Project Malabaricus | | |
| 2025 | Kerala Film Critics Awards | Best Female Playback Singer | "Minnalvala" – Narivetta | with J.R Divya Nair | |

== Discography ==
=== As composer ===
==== Albums ====
| Year | Title | Composer | Language | Link |
|---|---|---|---|---|
| 2017 | Ente Akasham | Sithara | Malayalam | |
| 2019 | Thodi | Sithara | Malayalam | |

==== Films ====
| Year | Title | Language | Director | Link |
|---|---|---|---|---|
| 2018 | Udalaazham | Malayalam | Unnikrishnan Avala | |
| 2018 | Katha Paranja Katha | Malayalam | Dr. Siju Jawahar | |

=== As playback singer ===
- All songs are in Malayalam language unless otherwise noted.

=== TV series ===
| Year | Title | Composer | Link/Notes |
|---|---|---|---|
| 2020 | Padatha Painkili (TV series) | M Jayachandran | |
| 2020 | Manam Pole Mangalyam | Gopi Sundar | |
| 2022 | Bhavana (TV series) | Gopi Sundar | |
| 2023 | Kaathodu Kaathoram | Balagopal | |
| 2024 | Mangalyam Tantunanena | Tej Mervin | |
| 2024 | Manorathangal | Ouseppachan | Song 'Pathi Murinnu' from the episode Kazcha, directed by Shyamaprasad |
| 2024 | Anamika | C.Sathya | |
| 2024 | Meenu's Kitchen | Deepak Venugopalan | Title Song |

==== Albums (non-film songs) ====
| Year | Title | Director | Link/Notes |
|---|---|---|---|
| 2013 | Thirithazhum Sandhyasooryan | Siraj | |
| 2014 | Pranayardram | Udhayabhanu | |
| 2015 | Nilathattam | | |
| 2015 | Haritham | Dhavesh | |
| 2015 | Mazhithulli | Tansen Berney | Tamil song |
| 2016 | Neeyen Sarvam | George | |
| 2017 | Avan Krupa | Sunny Jetson | |
| 2017 | Lokathil | Sunny Jetson | |
| 2017 | Ente Akasham | Herself | |
| 2018 | Krupayathra | Scaria | |
| 2018 | Nammal Randum | Yas Thirurangadi & Shanoof Ulikkal | |
| 2018 | Kaiyoppu | Tansen Berney | |
| 2018 | Sri Gurubhyo namah | Binish Bhaskaran | Sanskrit song |
| 2019 | Calvary | George | |
| 2019 | Mothirakallu | Graham | |
| 2019 | Paribhavam Marannu | Herself | |
| 2019 | Tharattu padan | Bobby | |
| 2019 | Sakhavinte Sakhi (2 songs) | Shamsu | |
| 2019 | Sahab | Sayan | |
| 2019 | Ninakkay Njan | Sudeep Palanad | |
| 2019 | Mizhi | Shameer Madatharayil | |
| 2019 | Krishnanandam | KM Udayan | |
| 2019 | Nee Valaranam Njan Kurayanam | Nelson Peter | |
| 2020 | Peyyundunde | Sunilkumar | |
| 2020 | Kalalayam | Shafeeq Rahman | |
| 2020 | Ormayil Njn Varacha | Nelson Peter | |
| 2020 | Nilavu Poothappol | Uday Ramachandran | |
| 2020 | Neeli | Eldhose and Kripa | |
| 2020 | Ormakale | Shifkath Rafi | |
| 2020 | Kangal Neeye | | Tamil song |
| 2020 | Ormakal | Jecin George | |
| 2020 | Mere Quda | Shukoor | |
| 2020 | Chayappattu | Herself | |
| 2020 | Corona Song | | |
| 2020 | Piriyuvanakilla ninne | Meenakshi Jaykumar | |
| 2020 | Song of Valor | Herself | |
| 2020 | Malakha | Ansar | |
| 2020 | Unthum Panthum Piranthum | Sadique Pandallur | |
| 2020 | Mohabatthin Athar | Kozhikode Aboobacker | |
| 2020 | Datham | Jomin Samuel | |
| 2020 | Swarnanalam | NK Prabhakaran | |
| 2020 | Nilapanthal | Shameer | |
| 2020 | Onathumbi | Gopan Panachikadu | |
| 2020 | Orumichoru Onam | Samuel Aby | |
| 2020 | Ente Neelakashapoykayil | Vineeshkumar | |
| 2020 | Aavani | Roshin Ramesh | |
| 2020 | Ormapookkal | Komalam Gopalakrishnan | |
| 2020 | Manasinte Madrasa | Anvar Ali | |
| 2020 | Ethramel | E.Jayakrishnan | |
| 2020 | Indumathi | Gopi Sundar | |
| 2020 | Parayanund Paribhavame | Sanjai and Helvis | |
| 2020 | Mehaboobi | Thej Mervin | |
| 2021 | Enthoru Marimayam Kanna | Gokul Menon / Rajeev Nair Pallassana | Ronima Creations |
| 2021 | Nagar | KK Nishad | |
| 2021 | Manathe Ambili | Manu Ramesan | |
| 2021 | Neeli | Eldhose | |
| 2021 | Undo Sakhi | Raheem Kutyadi | |
| 2021 | Hey Nila | | |
| 2022 | Uppayude Makal | Yahya | |

==== Malayalam film songs ====
| Year | Film | Song | Composer(s) |
|---|---|---|---|
| 2007 | Athishayan | Aluva Manappurathu | Alphons Joseph |
| 2008 | Chithrasalabhangalude Veedu | Vinniloodangingu | Dr.Muhammed Shakeel |
| 2009 | Gulumal | Kilu Kilukkum | Manu Ramesh |
| 2010 | Best of Luck | Thanka Thamizh | Palash Sen |
| 2010 | Pulliman | Allippoo Mallippoo | Sharreth |
| 2010 | Yakshiyum Njanum | Ponmaane | Sajan Madahav |
| 2010 | Elsamma Enna Aankutty | Kannaaram Pothi Pothi | Rajamani |
| 2010 | Marykkundoru Kunjaadu | Panchara Chiri Kand | Berny Ignatius |
| 2010 | Marykkundoru Kunjaadu | Kunjaade Kurumbanade | Berny Ignatius |
| 2011 | Traffic | Pakalin Pavanil | Mejo Joseph |
| 2012 | Chapters | Etho Nira Sandhyayil | Mejo Joseph |
| 2012 | Poppins | Mazha Mazha Mazha Mazha Mazhaye | Ratheesh Vegha |
| 2012 | Mallu Singh | Rub Rub There Rub | M. Jayachandran |
| 2012 | Chayilyam | Ambili Poomkala | Paris Chandran |
| 2012 | Mayamohini | Hath Le Le | Berny Ignatius |
| 2012 | Gruhanathan | Chinthum paadi | Rajamani |
| 2012 | Asuravithu | Aadyaanuraaga | Rajesh Mohan |
| 2012 | Ee adutha kaalath | O Ponthoovalaayi | Gopi Sundar |
| 2013 | Maad Dad | Maanathe Vellithinkal | Alex Paul |
| 2013 | Celluloid | Enundodee | M. Jayachandran |
| 2013 | Lucky Star | Isthiri Cut | Ratheesh Vegha |
| 2013 | Omega.exe | Mizhiyaale Cholli | Ronnie Raphael |
| 2013 | Climax | Thamara Poomkaikal | Berny Ignatius |
| 2013 | Orissa | – | Ratheesh Vegha |
| 2013 | Black Ticket | Naruliathullikal | Gayoz Johnson |
| 2013 | Police Maman | Police Maman | Anwar |
| 2013 | Bangles | Pen Poove Kunungi | Suvid Wilson |
| 2014 | Ettekal Second | Koodorukkidum | Colin Francis, K. Santhosh |
| 2014 | Weeping Boy | Kilimozhikal Alayayi | Anand Madhusoodanan |
| 2014 | Mr. Fraud | Sadaa Paalaya | Gopi Sundar |
| 2014 | Tamaar Padaar | Randattangal Kootimutti | Bijibal |
| 2014 | Mylanji Monjulla Veedu | Thammil Thammil | Afzal Yusuff |
| 2014 | Colour Balloon | Swapnakoodu | Mohan Sithara |
| 2014 | Turning Point | Hima Bindhukkal | Vidyadharan |
| 2014 | Cousins | Kannodu Kannidayum | M. Jayachandran |
| 2014 | Snehamulloral Koodeyullappol | Swapnathinu Kayyoppukal | Sajeev Mangalathu |
| 2014 | Monayi Angane Aanayi | Taj Theerthoru Shajahan | Vinu Uday |
| 2014 | Aval Vannathinu Shesham | Ethetho Nagara | Santhosh Raj |
| 2015 | Aakashangalil | – | Abhijith. P.S. Nair |
| 2015 | Sand City | Manasil Mazhaiyai | Rinil Gowtham |
| 2015 | Laila O Laila | Nanayumee Mazha | Gopi Sundar |
| 2015 | Sir C. P. | Ninte Nizhal Kondu | Sejo John |
| 2015 | Njan Ninnodu Koodeyundu | Peyyunnunde Minnunnunde | Sunil Kumar |
| 2015 | Ivide | Etho Theerangal | Gopi Sundar |
| 2015 | Rudra Simhasanam | Kaathil Parayumo | Vishwajith |
| 2015 | Love 24x7 | Venal Ozhiyunnu | Bijibal |
| 2015 | Ayal Njanalla | Neelavan Mukile Nee | Manu Ramesan |
| 2015 | Salt Mango Tree | Kaathilaro | Hesham Abdul Wahab |
| 2015 | Puthan Padam | – | Kanhangad Ramachandran |
| 2015 | Ilamveyil | Manjadikkunnil | Shiji |
| 2016 | Valleem Thetti Pulleem Thetti | Pooram Kaanan | Sooraj S Kurup |
| 2016 | Jacobinte Swargarajyam | Thiruvavaniraavu, Ennilerinju | Shaan Rahman |
| 2016 | Poyi Maranju Parayathe | Hima Bindhukkal | Vidhyadharan |
| 2016 | Ithinumappuram | Naagaraajaavaaya | Vidhyadharan |
| 2016 | Pa Va Pappanekkurichum Varkeyekkurichum | Pavakku Bhoomiyil | Anand |
| 2016 | Welcome to Central Jail | Ravin Chillayil | Nadirshah |
| 2016 | Yodhaavu | Azhakulloru, Thazhukaam Thazhukaam | S. Thaman |
| 2017 | Take It Easy | Mazhayazhake | Rajesh Babu |
| 2017 | C/O Saira Banu | Chakkikkochamme | Mejo Joseph |
| 2017 | Sathya | Chilankakal | Gopi Sundar |
| 2017 | Sakhavu | Udhichuyarnne | Prashant Pillai |
| 2017 | Godha | Wow Song | Shaan Rahman |
| 2017 | Thondimuthalum Driksakshiyum | Aayilyam | Bijibal |
| 2017 | Pokkiri Simon | Mampazhakkalam | Gopi Sundar |
| 2017 | Udaharanam Sujatha | Kanakku, Nee Njangada, Ethu Mazhayilum | Gopi Sundar |
| 2017 | Villain | Kandittum Kandittum | 4 Musics |
| 2017 | Sthaanam | Jeevitha Dukhatthin | Sam Kadamanitta |
| 2017 | Vimaanam | Vaanamakalunnuvo | Gopi Sundar |
| 2017 | Y | Hey Thandanane | Pramod Bhaskar |
| 2018 | Eeda | Marivil | Chandran Veyattummal |
| 2018 | Kadha Paranja Kadha | Pazhampattin Eenam | Sithara |
| 2018 | Kala Viplavam Pranayam | Vaanolam | Athul Anand |
| 2018 | Ira (film) | Etho Paattin Eenam | Gopi Sundar |
| 2018 | Kinar | Mazhavil Kaavile | M. Jayachandran |
| 2018 | Udalaazham | Medasooryante(f), Oridathoru, Puzhayil | Sithara, Mithun Jayaraj |
| 2018 | Aalorukkam | Oridathoru | Ronnie Raphael |
| 2018 | Kamuki | Sowhrudam | Gopi Sundar |
| 2018 | Theekuchiyum Panithulliyum | Akalangal | Anoop Jacob |
| 2018 | Njan Marykutty | Ennullil Ennum Nee Mathram, Kaanaa Kadalaasilaaro | Anand Madhusoodanan |
| 2018 | Orange Valley | Mazha Nanayum | Rhithwik S Chand |
| 2018 | Ente Ummante Peru | Madhu Chandrika Polor | Gopi Sundar |
| 2019 | Kumbalangi Nights | Cherathukal | Sushin Shyam |
| 2019 | Irupathiyonnaam Noottaandu | Akaleyetho Kanavu Thedi | Gopi Sundar |
| 2019 | Mikhael | Novinte Kayal Karayil | Gopi Sundar |
| 2019 | Zam Zam | Kili Penne | Amit Trivedi |
| 2019 | Kodathi Samaksham Balan Vakeel | Babuvetta | Gopi Sundar |
| 2019 | Magic Moments | Dhoorathengaay | Mejo Joseph |
| 2019 | Madhura Raja | Moha Mundhiri | Gopi Sundar |
| 2019 | Argentina Fans Kaattoorkadavu | Kaathu Kaathe | Gopi Sundar |
| 2019 | Uyare | Nee Mukilo | Gopi Sundar |
| 2019 | Muttayikallanum Mammaliyum | Kannaaram Pothaan | Ratheesh Kannan |
| 2019 | Thottappan | Pranthan Kandalin, Kayale | Leela Girish Kuttan |
| 2019 | Sameer | Jeevante Jeevanay | Sudeep Palanad |
| 2019 | Pathinettam Padi | Mazhayodu | Prasanth Prabhakar |
| 2019 | Margamkali | Ennuyire Penkiliye | Gopi Sundar |
| 2019 | Sathyam Paranja Viswasikkuvo | Pularippoo | Vishwajit |
| 2019 | Kalki | Vidavaangi | Jakes Bejoy |
| 2019 | Adukkalayil Paniyundu | Chil Chilambumani | Sangeethaa |
| 2019 | Happy Sardar | Njanakum Poovil | Gopi Sundar |
| 2019 | Edakkad Battalion 06 | Shehnai | Kailas Menon |
| 2019 | Dhamaka | Happy Happy Nammal Happy | Gopi Sundar |
| 2019 | Aakasha Ganga 2 | Thee Thudi | Bijibal |
| 2019 | Safe | Ariyumo Kaalame | Rahul Subrahmanian |
| 2019 | Love FM | Chandana Poomara | Ashraf Manjeri |
| 2019 | Ulta | Madikkanenthanu | Gopi Sundar |
| 2020 | Bhoomiyile Manohara Swakaryam | Smaranakal | Sachin Balu |
| 2020 | Kappela | Kadukumanikkoru Kannundu | Sushin Shyam |
| 2020 | Varkey | Pulariyil Ilaveyil | Francis Sabu, Sumesh Somasundar |
| 2020 | Kilometers and Kilometers | Thelinja Vaanaake | Sooraj S. Kurup |
| 2020 | Krishnankutty Pani Thudangi | Enkilumen Chenthamare | Anand Madhusoodanan |
| 2021 | Star | Kuruvaa Kaavile | M. Jayachandran |
| 2021 | Roy | Arikin Arikil | Munna P. M. |
| 2021 | Karl Marx Bhakthanayirunnu | Mathilkakathu | Manikandan Ayyappa |
| 2021 | Pushpa: The Rise (D) | Saami Saami | Devi Sri Prasad |
| 2021 | Santhoshathinte Onnam Rahasyam | Pakalukal | Basil CJ |
| 2021 | Kachi | Mizhiyoramariyaathe | Siraj Reza |
| 2021 | Snehakoodu | Chenthamara Poovin, En Jeevane | Vinod Sankunny Engandiyur, Simon Pavaraty |
| 2021 | Rabecca Stephante Chathuramuri 6.5 inch | Mazhakkarinoduvil | Yunuseo |
| 2021 | Again GPS | Kathoram Thazhuki Nadannu | Ragesh Swaminathan |
| 2021 | Kaanekkaane | Paalnilavin Poykayil | Ranjin Raj |
| 2021 | Thel | Mazhavillin Cheelu | Abhi Veda |
| 2021 | Ellam Sheriyakum | Ilapeytu Moodumi | Ouseppachan |
| 2021 | Thaara | Kidavu Menja | Vishnu V Divakaran |
| 2022 | Beyond the Seven Seas | Vella Kizhakkangu | Dr Vimal Kumar Kalipurayath |
| 2022 | Kaalachekon | Raavurangiya | Dr Girish Gnanadas |
| 2022 | Djinn | O Manuja | Prashant Pillai |
| 2022 | Aval | Kalavegam Odimayumbol | Arun Raj |
| 2022 | Grandma | Kathalye Kathalye | Jecin George |
| 2022 | Aaro | Kanna Nee | Bijibal |
| 2022 | Kayppakka | Chil Chilambumani | Sangeethaa |
| 2022 | Sundari Gardens | Mayamoham | Alphons Joseph |
| 2022 | Padma | Varumoru Sughanimisham | Ninoy Varghese |
| 2022 | Badal | Kaananasandhyakal | Bijibal |
| 2022 | Aviyal | Chirimozhikal | Shankar Sharma |
| 2022 | Jack N' Jill | Angane | Gopi Sundar |
| 2022 | Welcome to Pandimala | Mayum Ravin | Charles Simon |
| 2022 | Vaashi | Yaathonnum Parayaathe | Kailas Menon |
| 2022 | Nokkukuthi | Manamuruki Varanundu | Sajith Sankar |
| 2022 | Antharam | Koodillaa Koottil | Rajesh Vijay |
| 2022 | Jo and Jo | Thorappan song | Govind Vasantha |
| 2022 | Mike | Ladki Ladki | Hesham Abdul Wahab |
| 2022 | Sundari Gardens | Mayamoham | Alphons Joseph |
| 2022 | Anuradha Crime No.59/2019 | Aaranno Ethanno | Arun Raj |
| 2022 | Kudukku 2025 | Poove | Bhoomee |
| 2022 | Ellam Settaanu | Pennoruthi | P.S Jayhari |
| 2022 | Pathonpatham Noottandu | Vaanam | M. Jayachandran |
| 2022 | Chathuram | Raani | Prashant Pillai |
| 2022 | Thattassery Koottam | Kanda Naal | Raam Sarath |
| 2022 | Maahi | Melle Kathi | Raghupathi |
| 2022 | Moonam Chiraku | Neeyum Nilavum | Syam Prasad |
| 2022 | Prathi Niraparadhiyaano | Chandam Chindum | Arun Raj |
| 2023 | Rekha | Ormakal Orupaadu | Milan V.S, Nikhil V |
| 2023 | Ntikkakkakkoru Premondarnn | Koodey Nin Koodey | Nishant Ramteke |
| 2023 | Janaki Jaane | Karimizhi Niraye | Kailas |
| 2023 | Salmon 3D (D) | Raavil Viriyum | Sreejith Edavana |
| 2023 | Journey of Love 18+ | Mizhiyil Nirayum | Sanjay Prasannan |
| 2023 | Experiment 5 | Iniyumeth | Mineesh Thambaan |
| 2023 | Little Miss Rawther | Ra Ra Rajasika | Govind Vasantha |
| 2023 | Purple Poppins | Kulirormayayi | Nirshad Nini |
| 2023 | Pappa | Pakal Maayave | Jayesh Stephen |
| 2023 | Imbam | Soubhagyam | PS Jayhari |
| 2023 | Paathirakattu | Neela Shalabham | Biju Unity |
| 2023 | Jailer | Vadum Mullapoovalla | Riyas Payyoli |
| 2023 | Innalekal Thalirkkumbol | Vanashalabhame | Rajeesh K Chandhu |
| 2023 | Achanoru Vaazha Vechu | Holi Song | Bijibal |
| 2023 | Murivu | Chandana Perumazha | Yunuseo |
| 2023 | Digital Village | Kan Munnilai | Hari S.R |
| 2023 | Mahal | Karimegha Thazhappilum | Musthafa Ambadi |
| 2023 | Animal (D) | Kashmirin Saanu | Manan Bhardwaj |
| 2023 | Hi Nanna (D) | Hridayame | Hesham Abdul Wahab |
| 2024 | Hanu-Man (D) | Maangayachaar Anjaneya | Anudeep Dev |
| 2024 | Choottu | Mazhayurangatha Rathri | Samad Ammas |
| 2024 | Kuthood | Pularkalathannoru Naal | Jayachandran Kaavumthazha |
| 2024 | Palayam PC | Mizhi Paaki | Sadique Pandallur |
| 2024 | Anpodu Kanmani | Vadakkudikkiloru | Samuel Aby |
| 2024 | Porattu Nadakam | Nazhoori Paalu, Aare Vittathamma | Rahul Raj |
| 2024 | Mura | Veenurukiyo | Christy Joby |
| 2024 | Pushpa 2: The Rule (D) | Peelings | Devi Sri Prasad |
| 2024 | Rifle Club | Aalunnu Neeye | Rex Vijayan |
| 2024 | Vivekanandan Viralanu | Oru Chillupaathram | Bijibal |
| 2024 | Orumbettavan | Manjaadimani | Unni Nambiar |
| 2024 | Once Upon a Time in Kochi | Pande Pande | Hesham Abdul Wahab |
| 2024 | Manorajyam | Nilavinte | Yunuseo |
| 2025 | Aa Mukhangal | Neelaravile | Bibin Ashok |
| 2025 | Abhilasham | Thattathil | Sreehari K Nair |
| 2025 | Aayirapparanellu | Hathane Udaya | Samuel Aby |
| 2025 | Narivetta | Minnalvala | Jakes Bejoy |
| 2025 | Paithalattam | Kathiron | Leela L Gireesh Kuttan |
| 2025 | Dheeram | Neray Veeraa | Manikandan Ayyappa |
| 2025 | Ithiri Neram | Neeyorikkal | Basil C J |
| 2025 | Innocent | Dum Dum | Jay Stellar |
| 2025 | Pongala | Ravinte Ekantha | Ranjin Raj Varma |
| 2026 | Madhuvidhu | Mellave Mellave | Hesham Abdul Wahab |
| 2026 | Karakkam | Ore Yathrayil | Sam CS |

== Discography (other languages) ==
=== Tamil ===
| Year | Film | Song | Composer |
|---|---|---|---|
| 2010 | Muppozhudhum Un Karpanaigal | Kangal Neeye | G. V. Prakash Kumar |
| 2012 | Krishnaveni Panjaalai | Athadi | N. R. Raghunanthan |
| 2012 | Pathirama Pathukkunga | Azhagana | Shivaji Raja |
| 2012 | Kaathal Mouna Mozhi | Azhake Azhake Minal | Thej Mervin |
| 2013 | J.C Daniel | Ammadi Nan | M Jayachandran |
| 2013 | Chennaiyil Oru Naal | Iravin | Mejo Joseph |
| 2015 | Ettuthikkum Madhayaanai | – | Manu Ramesan |
| 2018 | Vandi | Va va en koode | Sooraj Kurup |

=== Kannada ===
| Year | Film | Song | Composer |
|---|---|---|---|
| 2011 | Aidondla Aidu | Hoyyuthuthe | Ouseppachan |
| 2011 | Aidondla Aidu | Malabandhaga | Ouseppachan |
| 2023 | Animal (D) | "Kaashmira Thaana" | Manan Bhardwaj |

=== Telugu ===
| Year | Film | Song | Composer |
|---|---|---|---|
| 2012 | Nirantharam Nee Voohale | Kanneeraina | G. V. Prakash Kumar |
| 2018 | Pantham | Right Now | Gopi Sundar |
| 2020 | Uma Maheswara Ugra Roopasya | Nuvvemo | Bijibal |
| 2022 | 18 Pages | Nannayya Raasina | Gopi Sundar |
| 2023 | Hi Nanna | Samayama | Hesham Abdul Wahab |
| 2024 | Om Bheem Bush | Aparichitha, Sammohanaa | Sunny M.R. |

== Filmography as actor ==
| Year | Film | Director | Role |
|---|---|---|---|
| 2019 | Ganagandharvan | Ramesh Pisharody | Judge in court |
| 2019 | Chola (film) | Sanal Kumar Sasidharan | Herself |
| 2022 | Sundari Gardens | Charle | Herself |

== Television shows ==
| Program | Role | Channel | Notes |
|---|---|---|---|
| Star Singer (season 10) | Judge | Asianet | |
| Star Singer (season 9) | Judge | Asianet | |
| Star singer junior season 3 | Judge | Asianet | |
| Super 4 Juniors | Judge | Mazhavil Manorama | |
| Manam Pole Mangalyam | Singer | Zee Keralam | TV series title song |
| Super 4 | Judge | Mazhavil Manorama | |
| Padatha Painkili | Singer | Asianet | TV series title song |
| Sa Re Ga Ma Pa Keralam | Judge | Zee Keralam | in Grand finale Replacing Sujatha Mohan |
| Top Singer Season 1 | Judge | Flowers TV | |
| Onnum Onnum Moonu | Guest | Mazhavil Manorama | |
