= Sonna Puriyathu =

2013 Indian film by Krishnan Jayaraj

- poster
- Directed by: Krishnan Jayaraj
- Written by: K. Chandru; D. Saravana Pandian (dialogues)
- Screenplay by: Krishnan Jayaraj
- Story by: Krishnan Jayaraj; Yatish Mahadev
- Produced by: 360 Degree Film Corp
- Starring: Shiva; Vasundhara Kashyap
- Cinematography: Saravanan
- Edited by: T S Suresh
- Music by: Yathish Mahadev
- Production company: 360 Degree Film Corp
- Distributed by: Sri Thenandal Films
- Release date: 26 July 2013
- Running time: 138 minutes
- Country: India
- Language: Tamil

Sonna Puriyathu (transl. You won't get it) is a 2013 Indian Tamil-language comedy film directed by debutant Krishnan Jayaraj. It stars Shiva and Vasundhara. The film was released on 26 July 2013. It had a good opening and finally declared as an above average hit in the boxoffice. The film's title is based on a song from Velayudham (2011).

== Plot ==
Shiva is a dubbing artist and a person who is not happy with love and marriages. His dream is to buy a Volkswagen car for himself. But his mother forces him by blackmailing him to marry and he finally accepts without satisfaction. The girl is Anjali who is revealed to be a devotional girl and is a press reporter. When the marriage of one of Shiva's friends takes place, both Anjali and Shiva are invited. Anjali is invited because the friend was forced by Shiva in order to stop their marriage. But in that marriage, Shiva gets to know that Anjali is the exact opposite of what he thought she was, and that Anjali herself wanted to stop their marriage. They finally break up and they make their parents also accept (Shiva lied to Anjali's father that he became impotent during a cricket match and Anjali cooks up a plot claiming that she became pregnant).

Shiva and Anjali celebrate their marriage cancellation in a pub. The next day, they find themselves in a hotel room together. Shiva and Anjali suspect that Shiva's friend Gowri made such arrangements. However, upon further investigation, the CCTV footage reveals that Seth was behind the arrangement. Shiva and Anjali solve the matter and go to Anjali's house to drop her. Anjali's father tries to make Anjali marry her co-worker. A few days later the broker Rajesh Khanna, who helped Shiva's mother, pays a visit to them with the news that they are going to organize a game show. The prize money from the game show will help Shiva to achieve his longtime dream. In the game, Shiva and Anjali win all the rounds. Anjali started falling in love with Shiva. Anjali feels sad when she learns that Shiva participated in the game only to win Volkswagen car and breaks up with him. With the insistence of his friends, Shiva realises Anjali's love. In order to unite with Anjali, Shiva set up a plan by making a stage actress to act as bride to marry so that Anjali would marry him. Rajesh Kanna who learns of Shiva's plan kidnaps Shiva. Later he leaves Shiva when he claims that Anjali is going to marry someone. When Siva arrives at register office. He sees Anjali getting married. Saddened, Shiva goes to a park and he witnesses a flash mob dancing towards him. It is revealed that it was Anjali's plan to surprise Shiva whereas his friend was also involved in this plan. Shiva and Anjali get married and live happily.

== Cast ==
- Shiva as Shiva
- Vasundhara Kashyap as Anjali
- Blade Shankar as Shiva's friend
- Pradeep K Vijayan as Bimbo
- Jacqueline as Shwetha
- Jangiri Madhumitha
- R. S. Shivaji as Anjali's father
- Manobala as Rajesh Khanna
- Gangai Amaran as TV show host
- Meera Krishnan as Shiva's mother
- Aarthi
- Vatsala Rajagopal as Shiva's grandmother
- Singamuthu as Naattamai
- Rajini Nivetha as Sharmilla Tagore
- Raghav as Settu Paiyan
- Saravanan
- Halwa Vasu
- Shyamili Sukumar
- Sam Anderson as himself (cameo)

== Production ==
Shiva will be seen in the role of dubbing artist who dubs for Tamil dubbed Hollywood movies and he plays a character who is scared of marrying. Sam Anderson who is best known for Yaaruku Yaaro made a cameo appearance. The film was shot extensively in Chennai and Gobichettipalayam.

== Soundtrack ==
Sonna Puriyathu

Soundtrack album by Yatish Mahadev
- Released: 2013
- Recorded: 2013
- Genre: Feature film soundtrack
- Language: Tamil
- Label: Think Music
- Producer: Yatish

Yatish Mahadev chronology
Indira Vizha (2009)	Sonna Puriyathu (2013)	Varusanaadu (2013)

Music is composed by Yathish Mahadev who earlier composed for Indira Vizha. Lyrics were written by Na Muthukumar and Madhan Karky. Shiva wrote the lyrics for the film's Hindi number Rosa Heh, in 20 minutes time, and sang it in 10 minutes. The song was not included in the audio CD. The audio was released on 9 January 2013. Behindwoods wrote:"Sonna Puriyadhu's music is simple and to the point".

- "Kelu Magane Kelu" - Jagadeesh Kumar
- "Kaaliyana Saalaiyil" - S. P. B. Charan, Chinmayi
- "Devathaya Rakshasiya" - Ranjith
- "Un Tholil Saindhu" - M. K. Balaji
- "Ayyayo Poche" - M. .K Balaji, Yatish
- "Sonna Puriyathu" - Theme music
- "Sagaroo" - Instrumental
- "Dance To It" - Instrumental

== Marketing ==
Posters where Shiva mocking James Bond, Titanic, Harry Potter were released in 2012.

== Release ==
The satellite rights of the film were secured by Kalaignar TV. The film's distribution rights were initially purchased by Studio Green, but later acquired by Sri Thenandal Films. Its available to watch on Amazon Prime Video app.

== Reception ==
Sonna Puriyathu received mixed reviews from critics. The New Indian Express said, "Mildly amusing and a promising work by a debutant, Sonna Puriyathu could have done with more punch in its screenplay". The Hindu showered accolades on the movie with the editor Sudhish Kamath giving the movie a 7/10 in his Twitter account and called everything is right about the movie, citing that "A breezy anti-romance comedy that works as a Tamizh Padam spin off with enough laughs to merit a watch.". Indiaglitz.Com rated 2.75/5 and gives a verdict that "One word – Shiva, he rocks, sizzles throughout his screen presence with a volley of one liner and gimmicks. The Times of India gave 3 stars for this movie.
