= S. Ramesan Nair =

Indian lyricist and poet (1948–2021)

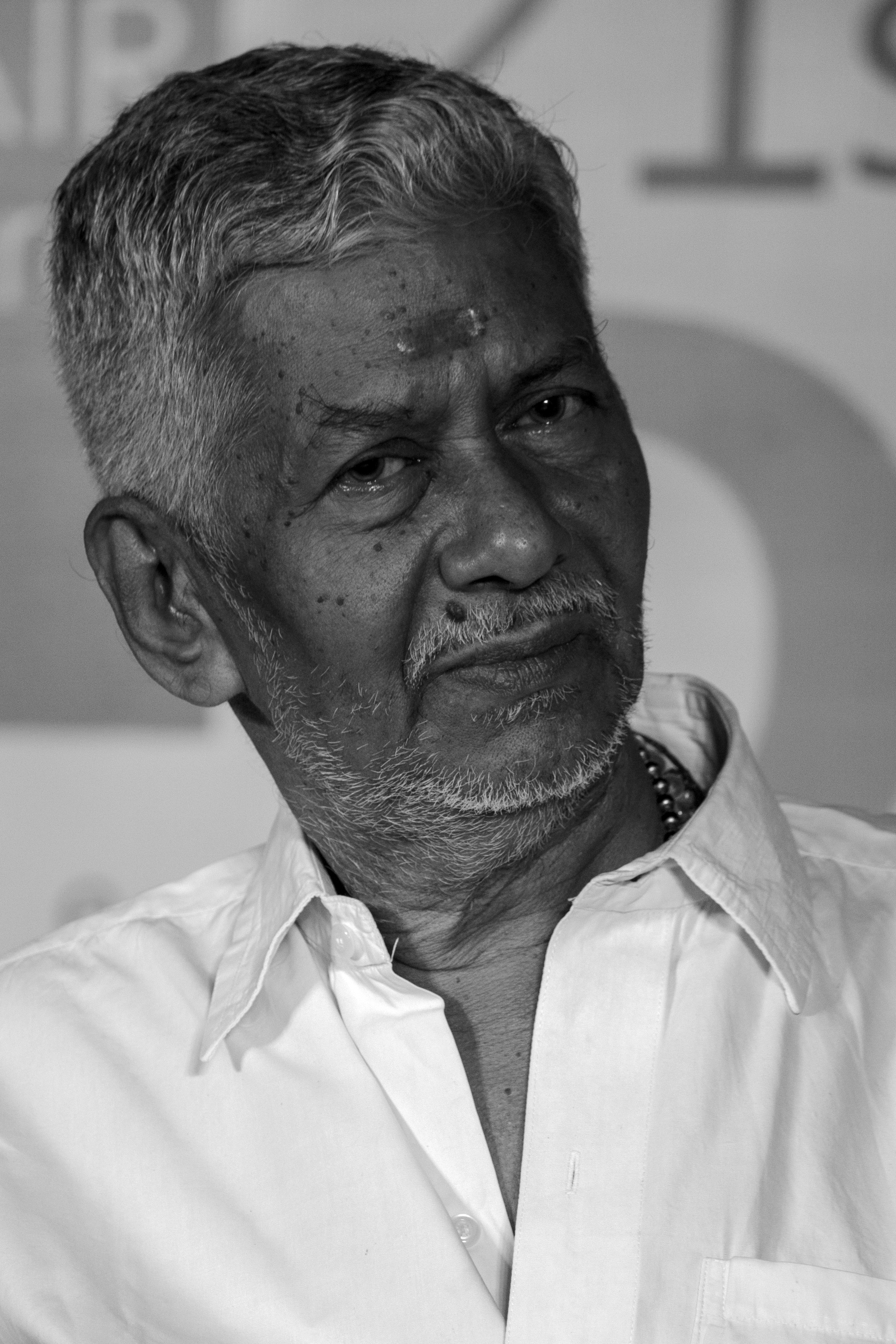
- S. Ramesan Nair in 2014
- Born: 3 May 1948; Kumarapuram, Travancore present-day Kanyakumari district, Tamil Nadu, India
- Died: 18 June 2021 (aged 73); Ernakulam, Kerala, Kerala, India
- Occupations: Lyricist, author, poet, translator
- Spouse: P. Rema
- Children: Manu Ramesan
- Writing career
- Language: Malayalam
- Years active: 1985–2021
- Genres: Poet and lyricist
- Notable awards: Kendra Sahitya Akademi Award in 2018; Kerala Sahitya Akademi award in 2018

S. Ramesan Nair (3 May 1948 – 18 June 2021) was an Indian lyricist and poet who worked predominantly in the Malayalam film industry. Over his career he wrote songs for over 170 films and over 3,000 devotional songs outside of the films. He debuted with the movie Pathamudhayam in 1985. He was a recipient of the Kerala Sahitya Akademi Award in 2010 and the Kendra Sahitya Akademi Award in 2018 for his collection of poems Gurupournami.

== Early life ==
S. Ramesan Nair was born on 3 May 1948 in a village named Kumarapuram in the present-day Kanyakumari district, in Tamil Nadu, as the son of Shadananan Thampi and Parvathi Amma. Being born in an area with high Tamil influence, he was equally fluent in both Malayalam and Tamil. Due to the intense passion towards poetry, he dropped his admission for MBBS and graduated with a bachelor's degree in economics in 1966 and later completed his post graduation in Malayalam Literature in 1972. He worked as a sub editor in Kerala Bhasha Institute and also worked with the All India Radio as a producer.

== Career ==
Nair was a playwright, lyricist, translator and commentator of classical Indian literature such as the Tamil works Chalappathikaram and Tirukkuṟaḷ. He achieved wide appreciations as a poet through works like Sooryahridayam, before starting his accomplished career as film lyricist in 1985 by penning songs for the movie Pathamudayam. He wrote songs for 170 films and 3,000 devotional tracks.

== Filmography ==
Nair made his entry into Malayalam films by writing songs for Rangam in 1985 for director I.V. Sasi. Through his career he went on to write songs for over 170 films working for composers including M. G. Radhakrishnan, Ouseppachan, Berny-Ignatius, Raveendran, Vidyasagar and Shyam.

Some of the popular movies for which he wrote songs included Kuruppinte Kanakku Pustakom, Aadyathe Kanmani, Aniyan Bava Chetan Bava, 19 April, Aniyathipraavu, and Raakuyilin Raagasadassil. His notable songs in these movies included Aavaniponnunjal, Mayilay Parannuva, Manju peyyana, Aniyathipravinu, Onnanam Kunninmel, Ambadi Payyukal Meyyum, Thei Oru Thenavayal and Oru Rajamalli. His last film as lyricist was My dear Machans in 2021.

== Awards and honours ==
S. Ramesan Nair received several accolades including

- Edasseri Award in 1983 for his poem Soorya Hrudayam.
- Vennikkulam Smaraka Award instituted by the Thadiyoor Dakshina Samskarika Vedhi in 2007.
- Kerala Sahitya Akademi Award for lifetime achievement in 2010.
- Asan Memorial Poetry Prize in 2011.
- Amrita Keerthi Puraskar in 2014
- Kerala Sangeetha Nataka Akademi Award under Light Music category in 2015.
- Balamani Amma Award in 2016 for lifetime achievement in language and literature instituted by Antharashtra Pusthakotsava Samithy.
- Sahitya Akademi Award in 2018 for the work Guru Pournami.
- Ramapurathu Warrier award in 2019.
- Venmani literature award
- Jnanappana Award
- Ulloor Award

== Personal life ==
Nair was married to his wife P. Rama, a school teacher. The couple had a son, Manu Ramesan, a music composer in the Malayalam movie industry. Nair died at the age of 73 on 18 June 2021, at Lakshmi hospital in Ernakulam, due to COVID-19 related complications. He was diagnosed earlier with cancer, and also suffered from many other illnesses. He was cremated with full state honours on the next day. He is survived by his wife Rema, son Manu and granddaughter Mayika.
