= Dark (film) =

- Theatrical release poster
- Directed by: Kalyan K. Jegan
- Screenplay by: Kalyan K. Jegan
- Story by: Ganesh K. Babu
- Produced by: A. P. V. Maran; Ganesh K. Babu; K. Senthil
- Starring: Ajay Karthi; Anchana Nethrun; Natty Subramaniam; K. Bhagyaraj
- Cinematography: Ravi Sakthi
- Edited by: Kathiresan Alagesan
- Music by: Manu Ramesan
- Production company: MG Studios
- Release date: 3 July 2026
- Running time: 110 minutes
- Country: India
- Language: Tamil

Dark is a 2026 Indian Tamil-language supernatural horror film written and directed by debutant Kalyan K. Jegan, from a story by co-producer Ganesh K. Babu. The film stars Ajay Karthi in the lead role alongside Anchana Nethrun, Natty Subramaniam, and K. Bhagyaraj amongst others. The music was composed by Manu Ramesan, cinematography was handled by Ravi Sakthi and editing by Kathiresan Alagesan. The film was released on 3 July 2026 and was not a box office success.

== Plot ==
In 2025, Vignesh, a graphic designer, moves into a low-rent house owned by Karunakaran. The house has a ominous reputation: in 2021, three previous tenants died in a murder–suicide by fire. Dismissing the rumours, Vignesh settles in, but soon experiences chilling supernatural disturbances, including strange sounds and momentary dark apparitions.

As he works from home, the haunting escalates. A book and a pan move on their own, and the television mysteriously turns on even after being unplugged. Panicked, Vignesh buries the haunted items outside, only for them to reappear inside his room. A terrifying unseen force touches him from behind, confirming his worst fears.

Driven out by the phenomena, Vignesh temporarily sleeps elsewhere. Unaware of the danger, his mother visits, gets a spare key from the owner’s daughter, Priyadarshini, and is terrorised by the house's entities. Later, Vignesh meets Priyadarshini, who claims her father ignores her because the 2021 murder–suicide was triggered when she rejected the advances of one of the dead tenants.

Dismissed by a doctor as hallucinating from sleeping pills, Vignesh challenges the entity. He becomes briefly possessed and paints a demonic mural on the wall. Karunakaran stays overnight to support him, but the paranormal activity strikes again, momentarily possessing the owner. Confronted by the burnt ghosts of the trio, a terrified Vignesh cuts himself with glass just to prove to the spirits that he is still alive.

The timeline shifts to a police investigation led by officer Balachander. Karunakaran has been found dead, and a severely traumatised Vignesh is recovering in the hospital. When Balachander visits Vignesh, he is desperately warned to stay away from the haunted house.

Investigating further, Balachander uncovers a dark twist: Priyadarshini actually died by suicide years ago in 2004. She had been betrayed, exploited, and left pregnant by the three men. The 2021 fire was not a random murder–suicide; Priyadarshini's vengeful ghost possessed one of the men to burn the trio alive for their sins.

Confronting the spirit, Balachander is directly warned by Priyadarshini to leave her territory. Realising the immense danger of the case, the officer backs down. Months later, he visits the house one last time, sees Priyadarshini's ghost roaming inside, and walks away without looking back.

== Cast ==
- Ajay Karthi as Vignesh
- Anchana Nethrun as Priyadarshini
- Natty Subramaniam as Balachander
- K. Bhagyaraj as Karunakaran
- Sibi Chakravarthy
- VTV Ganesh
- Aravind
- Shahul
- Naren

== Production ==
Dark is the directorial debut of Kalyan K. Jegan and the first film of Ajay Karthi as hero. It was shot prominently in Chennai. Ganesh K. Babu, the film's story writer, also co-produced the film. He said that while writing the story he drew inspiration from his experiences as a reporter in a crime series on a private television channel. This was one of the last films of Bhagyaraj, who died a week before the film's release. Cinematography was handled by Ravi Sakthi, and editing by Kathiresan Alagesan.

== Music ==
The music was composed by Manu Ramesan. Two songs, "Irulenbathu" and "Adakuna Adakuna" were released as singles, in April 2025 and June 2026 respectively.

== Release and reception ==
Dark was released on 3 July 2026. Abhinav Subramanian of The Times of India wrote, "Dark has just enough atmosphere to get under your skin and just enough incoherence to leave you wondering what it all amounted to". Dina Thanthi lauded the performances of Ajay, Natty and Bhagyaraj, along with the cinematography and music but criticised logical mistakes. Dinamalar reviewed the film less positively, giving it 2.5/5, appreciating Natty and Bhagyaraj's performances but feeling Anchana was underutilised, and said it was unclear whether the film was a mental breakdown story or horror film shown. Kalki Online appreciated the cast performances and technical aspects but criticised the screenplay, calling it derivative. Nakkheeran gave a positive review, praising the story, cast performances, cinematography and suspense factor.
