= Njan Kandatha Sare =

Indian thriller film

- Theatrical release poster
- Directed by: Varun G Panicker
- Written by: Arun Karimuttam
- Produced by: Prakash Highline; Ameer Abdulazeez
- Starring: Indrajith Sukumaran
- Cinematography: Prasanth Krishna
- Edited by: M. S. Aiyappan Nair
- Music by: Manu Ramesan
- Production companies: Highline Pictures; Ameer Abdulazeez Productions; Lemon Productions
- Release date: 22 November 2024
- Running time: 119 minutes
- Country: India
- Language: Malayalam

Njan Kandatha Sare (transl. Sir, I did see !) is a 2024 Indian Malayalam-language thriller film directed by Varun G Panicker, starring Indrajith Sukumaran in the lead role. The film was released to mixed-to-negative reviews upon release.

== Cast ==
- Indrajith Sukumaran as Joekuttan
- Baiju Santhosh
- Sudheer Karamana
- Deepu Karunakaran
- Anoop Menon
- Sabumon Abdusamad
- Alencier Ley Lopez
- Mareena Michael Kurisingal
- Parvathy Arun
- Sampath Ram
- Biju Pappan
- Mallika Sukumaran
- Balaji Sarma
- Gibin Gopinath
- Binoj Kulathoor
- Ajith Dhanwanthari
- Sharath Vinayak
- Surya Rajesh
- Anjana Appukkuttan

== Soundtrack ==
The music was composed by Manu Ramesan.

- "Bhoomiyil"
- "Ambada Njane"

== Reception ==
Swathi P Ajith of Onmanorama wrote, "The film's strong point lies in the seamless blend of its technical elements. Both the cinematography and the background score are exceptional, adding to the overall impact. With a crisp runtime of under two hours, the film keeps the audience engaged by skillfully balancing humour with its underlying thriller vibe". Rohit Panikker of Times Now rated the film 2.5/5 and wrote, "Njan Kandatha Sare is a fun, breezy watch that begins well, but fails to keep the momentum or the interest going because of an inconsistent screenplay, one that did not even allow a plethora of fantastic cast members a chance at contribute". Sanjith Sidhardhan of OTTplay rated the film 1.5/5 and wrote, "Everything about Njan Kandatha Sare screams that it doesn't warrant a theatre or OTT viewing, from its lazy screenplay to its music that seems to be made from default audio tones on cellphones. The only place where it could find viewers would be TV, maybe a decade ago".
