= Raattinam =

2012 Indian film by K. S. Thangasamy

- Theatrical release poster
- Directed by: K. S. Thangasamy
- Written by: K. S. Thangasamy
- Produced by: S. Madhan
- Starring: Laguparan; Swathy
- Cinematography: Philip R Sunder
- Edited by: Gopi Krishna
- Music by: Manu Ramesan
- Distributed by: Vendhar Movies
- Release date: 18 May 2012
- Running time: 178 minutes
- Country: India
- Language: Tamil

Raattinam (transl. Roller Coaster) is a 2012 Indian Tamil language romantic drama film, directed by K. S. Thangasamy, starring Laguparan and Swathy. It is produced by S. Madhan and featured music composed by Manu Ramesan. Raattinam is set in the port city which forms the backdrop for his tale on love and its ramifications. The film was released on 18 May 2012.

== Cast ==
- Laguparan as Jayam
- Swathy as Dhanam
- Ajay Adith as 'Panai' Sekhar
- K. S. Thangasamy as Ashok
- Elizabeth
- Tharun Master
- Umasree
- Revathi
- L. Raja as Dhanam's father

== Production ==
K. S. Thangasamy made his directorial debut through this film and previously worked as an assistant for the film Pidichirukku (2008), where he met Manu Ramesan on the sets. Laguparan, who previously worked as an assistant director, met Thangasamy through Facebook.

== Soundtrack ==
The soundtrack was composed by Manu Ramesan. K. Bhagyaraj and Gautham Vasudev Menon attended the film's audio launch function.

All music is composed by Manu Ramesan.

No.	Title	Lyrics	Singer(s)	Length
1.	"Asathum Azhagu"	Viveka	Ajay Sathyan, Naveen Madhav, Srilekha Parthasarathy	3:58
2.	"Yeno En Idhayam"	Viveka	Haricharan, Navin Iyer	5:00
3.	"Yele Yepulla"	Viveka	Karthik, Chinmayi	4:54
4.	"Yethu Yethu"	K. S. Thangasamy	Jassie Gift, Anoop Shankar	4:30
5.	"Yenakkulla"	K. S. Thangasamy	Vidhu Prathap	2:11
6.	"Yakkai Suttrum"	Francis Kripa	Anoop Shankar, Bhavyalakshmi	4:27
Total length:				24:58

== Critical reception ==
A critic from The Times of India wrote, "Right from the romance between a school girl and a happy-go-lucky youngster to the devious manner in which the families of the lovers try to keep them apart, the film brings to mind the 2004 trendsetter [Kaadhal]". A critic from The Hindu wrote, "Raattinam is a film that succeeds in surprising you on more occasions than just one — the biggest surprise coming right at the end, in the form of the climax. To be fair to director K. S. Thangasamy, his story may appear clichéd, but the message he communicates through his film is relatively fresh and one that makes sense." A critic from The New Indian Express wrote, " Smaller films of debutants in the recent past have made a much stronger impact than star studded extravaganzas. And, Raattinam’ definitely falls in the list of impressive films".
