= Sam Anderson (Tamil actor) =

Indian actor (born 1977)

- Born: Anderson Samuel; 1 April 1977 (age 49); Erode, Tamil Nadu, India
- Occupations: Actor, Comedian
- Years active: 2007–2015

Sam Anderson is a former Indian actor. He played the lead role in the Tamil film Yaarukku Yararo and became popular on the internet for his "feeble dance moves and feebler acting skills". His acting skills are frequently ridiculed in the social media, alongside fellow actor "Power Star" Srinivasan.

== Early life ==
He was born in Erode, Tamil Nadu and originally ran a courier delivery business, with an employee base of five in Salem. Anderson was inspired by the Tamil film Chocolate (2001), and decided to turn his life towards the cinema industry. Before he worked as a staff in Time IIT coaching institution in Erode.

== Career ==
Anderson played the lead role David, in the film Yaaruku Yaaro, produced by his uncle, and released in four theatres in Tamil Nadu. For the sake of the film, Anderson Samuel changed his name to Sam Anderson, and practised acting, story-writing and dancing in front of a mirror.

Yaaruku Yaaro ran for 25 days in the 4 theatres released. The film was released in parts on YouTube, and "went viral" on the Internet. Anderson states "What is the secret of my success? It could be because everything went wrong in my first attempt".

After his debut, he appeared in many cameo roles in Tamil films.

== Filmography ==
- All films are in Tamil, unless otherwise noted.

Year	Title	Role	Notes
2007	Yaaruku Yaaro	David	
2007	Chennai 600028	David	
2012	Siripu Varalana Porupu Naanga Illa	Gnana Prakash	short
2013	Naveena Saraswathi Sabatham	Kumar	Cameo appearance
2013	Sonna Puriyathu	Himself	Cameo appearance
2013	Thalaivaa	Himself	Cameo appearance
2013	Biriyani	Himself	Cameo appearance
2015	Ettuthikkum Madhayaanai	Bommai	
2015	Maharani Kottai		
2015	10 Endrathukulla	Das' henchman	
