= Three Kings (2011 film) =

- Theatrical release poster
- Directed by: V. K. Prakash
- Written by: Y. V. Rajesh
- Produced by: Abdul Nazar alias Jeevan
- Starring: Kunchacko Boban; Jayasurya; Indrajith Sukumaran; Samvrutha Sunil; Sandhya; Ann Augustine
- Cinematography: Venu
- Edited by: Mahesh Narayanan
- Music by: Ousepachan
- Production companies: KNM Films; Trends Adfilm Makers; Innostorm Entertainment
- Distributed by: PlayHouse Release
- Release date: 2 July 2011
- Country: India
- Language: Malayalam

Three Kings is a 2011 Indian Malayalam-language slapstick comedy caper film directed by V. K. Prakash and starring Kunchacko Boban, Jayasurya, and Indrajith Sukumaran in lead title roles, alongside Samvrutha Sunil, Sandhya, Ann Augustine, Jagathy Sreekumar, Suraj Venjaramoodu and Salim Kumar in supporting roles. In the film, three estranged brothers, who are also princes in a royal family, set out on a journey in search of a treasure. However, a mysterious revelation sorts out all the conflict among them.

== Plot ==
Shankar alias Shanku, Ram and Bhaskar alias Bhasi are three cousins from a royal family who always fought with each other since childhood. None of them allows others to prosper and creates trouble for each other in whatever they do. Their parents have taken money from a money lender called Dinakaran who has given the money on the lease of the palace. When the debts increase, the three realise that they cannot repay the money and get back to the palace. So they try to steal the papers from Dinakaran's house with the help of his daughters, who are their girlfriends. But Dinakaran catches them and hands them over to the police.

In the police lockup, they happen to hear from a blind man that there is a treasure hidden somewhere in Naga Halli, Mysore forest which belonged to their family. He says that this was hidden by Tipu Sultan centuries back. He can help them if they promise to give him a portion of it. But that night, his illness becomes worse and he dies on his way to the hospital, but he hands the three a map of the treasure before he leaves the cell.

The three kings leave for Mysore to find the treasure. Each of them takes a different route and tries to be there first and make the treasure their own, but ultimately they have to join hands because each of them has only one portion of the map which they split while having a fight in the police lockup. Finally, they find the treasure but it turns out that everything was a forged play and they were part of a reality show which a popular channel organized. They all end up humiliated because cameras were following them every moment and caught all their fights on camera and broadcast them.

But during one of the fights they had inside the cave, it turns out that the three kings misplaced the gold idol kept by the channel and took the real golden idol itself. This makes them all rich and they take back the palace from the money lender. The three kings marry their girlfriends and they have three children. In the final scene, it is shown that their three children are fighting each other just as fathers once did, showing that the legacy continues.

== Cast ==
- Kunchacko Boban as Raman Unni Raja (Ram), the younger son of the family, who is trying to make a money by taking part in various reality shows and game shows on television
  - Ramzan Muhammed as Young Ram
- Jayasurya as Shankaran Unni Raja, (Shanku), the second elder son of the family and an aspiring actor, who wants to be a famous actor to become wealthy
- Indrajith Sukumaran as Bhaskaran Unni Raja (Bhasi), the eldest son of the family and an aspiring cricket player, who is trying to become an international player to be wealthy
- Samvrutha Sunil as Anjana (Anju), Shankar's girlfriend
- Sandhya as Manju, Bhasi's girlfriend
- Ann Augustine as Ranju, Ram's girlfriend
- Suraj Venjaramoodu as Achuvettil Achankunju
- Salim Kumar as K. S. Prashanthan
- Jagathy Sreekumar as Dinakaran, Anju's, Manju's and Ranju's father
- Ashokan as Ashok Varma, rival cousin of the 3 "kings" and planner of the treasure hunt
- Vijay Babu as Channel Head
- Kunchan as himself (cameo appearance)
- Sasi Kalinga as Sabu, one of the actors in Ashok's plan of the treasure hunt
- Krishnamoorthy as Doddapetta Srinivasa Allari Nagendra Vijayawada Alludu Gobba Yadugiri Venkateshwara Rajashekhara Reddy / Krishna Rao, one of the actors in Ashok's plan of the treasure hunt
- Sreejith Ravi as Murugappan / LIC Ramachandran Nair, one of the actors in Ashok's plan of the treasure hunt
- Dinesh Prabhakar as Dinesh, one of the actors in Ashok's plan of the treasure hunt
- Balachandran Chullikadu as Shankaran Unni Raja's father
- Ambika Mohan as Shanku's mother
- Gita Nair as Ram's mother
- Omana Ouseph as Bhasi's mother
- Gayathri as Baby girl's mother
- Ramesh Valiyashala as Sub-inspector
- Majeed as an advocate

== Soundtrack ==
The soundtrack of the film, was composed by Ouseppachan, features 4 comic-genre songs.

S. No.	Song	Performer(s)
1	"Bilsila Hai Bilsila"	Jayasurya
2	"Chakkara Maavin Pothilirikkum"	Anoop Sankar, Swetha Mohan
3	"Pachukkuthirumburukkee"	Anoop Sankar, Franco
4	"Paara Paara" (Theme song)	Anoop Sankar, Jerry John
