= Jagadeesh Kumar =

Indian playback singer

- Kumar at a recording studio

Background information
- Born: 21 October 1985 (age 40); Chennai, Tamil Nadu, India
- Origin: Kanchipuram, Tamil Nadu, India
- Occupation: Playback singer

Jagadeesh Kumar is an Indian playback singer. He was nominated for an Edison Award for Best Male Playback Singer in 2015 for the song "Silatta Pilatta" from the Tamil film Kanchana 2 (2015).

== Early life ==
Jagadeesh Kumar started his music career at the age of 16. He graduated from Loyola College, Chennai with an M.A. in Media Arts and Visual Communication. He then joined K. M. Music Conservatory to improve his skills in Opera and Carnatic music.

== Career ==
Jagadeesh Kumar found a breakthrough after his work was recognised in the movie Sonnaa Puriyadhu (2013) in which he sang the song "Kelu Maganae Kelu" and then in the horror comedy super hit film Kanchana 2 (2015) for the song "Sillaatta Pillaata". His recent work is for the Song "I want to Marry" for the upcoming movie, "Charlie Chaplin 2".

== Filmography ==
Year	Film	Song	Music director	Co-artist(s)
2013	Sonna Puriyathu	"Kelu Magane Kelu"	Yathish Mahadev	
2015	Kanchana 2	"Silatta Pilatta"	C. Sathya	
2016	Selvi (dubbed)	"Malligai Pandhale"	Ghibran	
2016	Bathiladi	"Thulludae"	Thomas Rathnam	
2016	Muthina Kathirika	"Summa Sollakoodathu"	Siddharth Vipin	
2017	Yaman	"Sigaram Chella"	Vijay Antony	Ranjith Unni, Velmurugan, Ayappan
2017	Yaman	"Neeye Thaniyaai"	Vijay Antony	
2017	Kodiveeran	"Ayyo Adi Aathe"	N. R. Raghunanthan	Vandana Srinivasan
2018	Junga	"Amma Mela Sathiyam"	Siddharth Vipin	Pavithra Gokul
2019	Charlie Chaplin 2	"I Want to Marry You"	Amresh	Bhargavi
2019	Thirumanam	"Aasaiyai Solla Ninaikkiren"	Siddharth Vipin	Priyanka, Dr. Narayanan, Sukanya, M. S. Bhaskar, Thambi Ramaiah
2019	Thirumanam	"Ethanai Kanavu Kandiruppom"	Siddharth Vipin	Ranjith Unni, Aparna, Kamalaja, Swagatha, Siddharth Vipin
2019	Thirumanam	"Thedudhe Thedudhe"	Siddharth Vipin	Kamalaja
2019	Thirumanam	"Varaamaley Vandhaley"	Siddharth Vipin	
