= Agaram (film) =

- Title card
- Directed by: T. Nagarajan
- Written by: T. Nagarajan
- Produced by: AP Sivayogen
- Starring: Nandaa; Archana
- Cinematography: Vetri
- Edited by: Justin Roy
- Music by: Yuvan Shankar Raja
- Production company: Shree Bhuvaneasvari Pictures
- Release date: 16 February 2007
- Running time: 137 minutes
- Country: India
- Language: Tamil

Agaram (transl. Beginning) is a 2007 Indian Tamil-language action film written and directed by T. Nagarajan. It stars Nandaa and Archana, with Biju Menon portraying the antagonist, and Vivek, Seetha and Raj Kapoor among others in supporting roles. Despite being announced shortly after Nandaa's debut in 2002, the film's release was delayed and eventually released on 16 February 2007, failing at the box office. The film's title is a reference to the first letter of the Tamil alphabet.

== Plot ==
Thiru is a young Airtel employee who has just moved into the family's new house in Tuticorin with his sister, mother, and grandmother. Their happiness is tinged with the grief of Thiru's father's recent death, before the construction could be completed. Fate decrees that the entire family be placed in jeopardy when Thiru has an argument with Pasupathy, the brother of the dreaded don of the waterfront mafia, Varma, during the local elections. Varma swears to kill Thiru, agreeing to spare his life for just four days until the election ends, at the request of his politician crony, who is all set to become the MLA. The family flees but is captured and brought back to face the atrocities unleashed by Varma's goons.

== Cast ==
- Nandaa as Thiru
- Archana as Preethi
- Biju Menon as Varma
- Vivek as Thiru's friend
- Ilavarasu as MLA
- Seetha as Thiru's mother
- Varshini as Thiru's sister
- Sukumari as Thiru's grandmother
- Ajay Rathnam as Police Commissioner
- Raj Kapoor as Police Deputy Superintendent
- Besant Ravi as Pasupathy
- Anamika
- Agathiyan as Thiru's father in a cameo role
- Sheetal Menon as an Item number

== Production ==
The film began production in 2003 under the title Thiru. One of the fight sequences was shot at sea with more than 30 boats and 100 stuntmen.

== Soundtrack ==
The soundtrack was composed by Yuvan Shankar Raja. The soundtrack was released on 12 December 2005, nearly 14 months before the film's theatrical release. It has five tracks with lyrics written by Snehan.

| Song | Singer(s) | Duration |
|---|---|---|
| "Line Kidaichidiche" | Harish Raghavendra, Shardha | 4:39 |
| "Unnai Naan Paarthen" | Mahalakshmi Iyer, Anoop Sankar | 4:27 |
| "Ponnu Thottaa" | Manicka Vinayagam, Malgudi Subha | 4:21 |
| "Adadaa Adadaa" | Harini, Anoop Sankar | 5:24 |
| "Tappu Egirippogum" | Tippu, Pushpavanam Kuppusamy | 4:17 |

== Critical reception ==
Chennai Online wrote "It's the director's second venture, coming after a long gap after 'Aravindan' the Sarathkumar-starrer. And as in his earlier film, Nagarajan has tried here too to give a different dimension to an oft-repeated tale. He's managed to keep the happenings interesting and the pace racy by a change in the ambience, and the slight variations he brings to the situations". The Hindu wrote, "[..] the plot is credible, the pace is racy and director Nagaraj, also in charge of story and screenplay, proves that he can tell a story and tell it well. But just when events are ripe for that crucial twist in the tale that can empower the hero, the screenplay opts for a filmi solution." Sify wrote, "The story, screenplay and treatment of director T. Nagarajan are outdated and predictable with hardly any twist". Rediff.com wrote, "Agaram is a very obvious attempt at making a formulaic masala movie. However, it turns out far from satisfactory. Though director Nagaraj has claimed credit for something called the story, there wasn't much of it in the movie. A recycled plot and utterly weak dialogues leave the viewer clutching his wrists through the movie".
