= Ettuthikkum Madhayaanai =

2015 Indian film by K S Thangasamy

Ettuthikkum Mathayaanai
- Poster
- Directed by: K S Thangasamy
- Written by: K S Thangasamy
- Produced by: K S Thangasamy
- Starring: Sathya; Sreemukhi
- Cinematography: R J Jai
- Edited by: Deepak S Dwaraknath
- Music by: Manu Ramesan
- Production company: Raattinam Pictures
- Release date: 27 February 2015
- Country: India
- Language: Tamil

Ettuthikkum Madhayaanai (transl. Mad elephant in eight directions) is a 2015 Tamil language film directed and produced by K S Thangasamy. The film stars Sathya and Sreemukhi, while Laguparan and Sam Anderson play other pivotal roles. The film was released on 27 February 2015.

== Cast ==
- Sathya as Natesan (Natty)
- Sreemukhi as Sarah
- Bhanu Chander as Ponmanikkam
- Sam Anderson as Bommai
- Anoop Sankar
- Laguparan as Prabha
- Asathapovathu Rajkumar as Ragupathy
- Sheimour Roosevelt as Chellamuthu
- K. S. Thangasamy as Tamizhselvan
- Guhan Rajagopal
- Madurai Bala
- Ajay Adith

== Production ==
Thangasamy chose Sreemukhi for the leading female role after seeing pictures of her online, following her performances in the Telugu films Julayi and Prema Ishq Kadhal. He subsequently asked her to put on weight to play the role of a TV anchor. The film was primarily shot in Tirunelveli, with 60% complete by August 2013.

The film's soundtrack composed by Manu Ramesan was launched on 12 March 2014.
