= Pidichirukku =

- Theatrical release poster
- Directed by: Kanagu
- Written by: Kanagu
- Produced by: Chida. Senbaga Kumar
- Starring: Ashok Kumar; Vishakha Singh
- Cinematography: D. V. Raameswaran
- Edited by: G. Sasikumar
- Music by: Manu Ramesan
- Release date: 15 January 2008
- Country: India
- Language: Tamil

Pidichirukku (transl. I like it) is a 2008 Indian Tamil-language romance film, produced by Kool Productions Chida Shenbaga Kumar, directed by Kanagu, starring Ashok Kumar, Vishakha Singh, Sampath Raj, Ganja Karuppu and Saranya Ponvannan. The cinematography is by D. V. Raameswaran and Manu Ramesan scored the music. The film was released on 15 January 2008, during Pongal.

== Plot ==
Vel is a Hindu from a lower-middle-class family and a booking clerk at a lorry transport and cargo agency in Thoothukudi. Manju is a Roman Catholic girl, studying in the local college. Their first meeting is an accident caused due to her negligence – when sitting as pillion rider on the back of her father's scooter and trying to go through her examination notes, the paper and her dupatta flies off, blinding the bike rider coming behind.

Vel, who was the rider, finds his bike skidding and ends up with bruises. He shouts at Manju and her father Mariadas who was riding the scooter, without realizing that he is the new customs officer at the local port with whom he has to interact due to the nature of his work. Manju feels concern for Vel, fearing that due to her mistake he may end up with a head injury.

Later she meets him and sends him a note to take a head scan, which leads to hilarious scenes as his assistant 'Tyre' thinks it is a love letter. But as always after the initial spats and quibbles, both Vel and Manju are deeply drawn towards each other. One day while they are romancing on the back of an empty but moving lorry, they are intercepted by Mariadas. All hell breaks loose for the lovers as Manju is brutally beaten up by her dad as her mother Stella tries to protect her. A distraught and drunk Vel on the advice of Tyre and other lorry drivers go to her house in the night asking for her hand, which leads to bedlam.

Three days later, a sobered Vel goes to her house to apologise and finds that they have left town and Mariadas has resigned from customs and just disappeared. How Vel finds her whereabouts and goes to Pune in search of her and undergoes real tough times is what the rest of the film is about.

== Cast ==
- Ashok Kumar as Vel
- Vishakha Singh as Manju
- Sampath Raj as Mariadas
- Ganja Karuppu as Esakki (Tyre)
- Saranya Ponvannan as Stella

== Soundtrack ==
The soundtrack was composed by Manu Ramesan.

Song	Singer(s)
"Kaatrodu Solli"	Karthik, Sadhana Sargam
"Enge Nee"	Ranjith, Mano, Lakshmi
"Yaaridam Naan"	Harish Raghavendra, Sujatha
"En Kadhale"	S. P. Balasubrahmanyam

== Release and reception ==
Pidichirukku was released on 15 January 2008, during Pongal. Pavithra Srinivasan of Rediff.com gave the film a rating of three out of five stars and noted that "For Shenbaga Kumar's Tamil film, Pudichirukku, directed by Kanagu with a host of newbies and some recognizable oldies is quite decent as it goes, which is saying quite a lot". A critic from Sify wrote "What makes Pidichirukku work is the simple narrative and the love between the lead pair is established in a way that is believable at the same time enjoyable. The script is smartly packaged by Kanagu with a winsome screenplay on the bitter-sweet nature of romance; comedy of Kanjakaruppu is part of the story and acts as a catalyst to move the story forward".

S. R. Ashok Kumar from The Hindu wrote, "The approach is indeed different for a love story and the dialogue is crisp. The director should have capitalised on these pluses with a strong screenplay". Madhumitha of Kalki praised the acting of cast, Ganja Karuppu's humour, Rameswaran's camera and Manu's music and concluded saying a compelling screenplay eats up everything but felt emotional intensity of the heart-poundingly told and developing screenplay is lost in the climax if this flaw was rectified this would have been another Kaadhal. Malini Mannath of Chennai Online wrote "A love story sensitively narrated, the script weaved in with humour and interesting little scenes to depict the growing love between the lead pair, makes ‘Pidichirukku’ an engaging entertainer. Director Kanagu (he's apprenticed with Cheran) makes a mark with his very first film, as a director who has a fair grip on the medium. The freshness and charm of the lead pair, and their screen rapport adds to the film's appeal".
