= Pathamudayam =

- Directed by: J. Sasikumar
- Written by: S. L. Puram Sadanandan
- Produced by: Balakrishnan Nair
- Starring: Mohanlal; Urvashi; M. G. Soman; T. G. Ravi
- Cinematography: J. Williams
- Edited by: G. Venkittaraman
- Music by: Darsan Raman; K. J. Joy (Background Score)
- Production company: Gandhimathi Films
- Distributed by: Gandhimathi Release
- Release date: 18 October 1985
- Country: India
- Language: Malayalam

Pathamudayam (transl. Tenth sunrise) is a 1985 Indian Malayalam-language action thriller film directed by J. Sasikumar and written by S. L. Puram Sadanandan. It is a remake of the 1976 Hindi film Kalicharan, and the film stars Mohanlal, Urvashi, M. G. Soman and T. G. Ravi; Mohanlal played dual roles (for the first time in a film) as Sub-Inspector Jayamohan and Vikraman. The film features music composed by Darsan Raman.This film is considered to be one of the first blockbusters of Mohanlal.

== Plot ==
Menon initially appears to be an honest, rich, and kind-hearted man. However, he is actually the infamous criminal known as "Lion", under whom black-marketing, smuggling and robberies flourish. He keeps his identity well-hidden, making sure no one has an idea about his evil deeds, not even his close friend IG B. G. Menon. Menon is very worried at the sorry state of affairs in the city and state.

The government requests to bring back Inspector Jayamohan to the city as he is an honest and fearless cop. Jayamohan comes to town and starts cracking on the criminals with an iron hand. Jayamohan is the son of IG Menon and is a widower who has two small children. After making substantial raids, Jayamohan learns that Lion C. Menon is a corrupt man and a demon for the society. He plans to spill the beans in front of everyone, but is killed by Lion C. Menon's men. Before dying, he keeps a typical clue for the police to nab the criminal, but nobody is able to understand what the clue says.

Menon is heartbroken and he loses hope in life. Due to a friend he learns that there is a ferocious prisoner Vikraman in a jail who resembles Jayamohan. Menon visits him, but finds him a beastly figure. Still in an attempt to trace the criminal, he gets him released and takes him to a hill station where he attempts to transform him. But Vikrman is a tough nut to crack. However, after some time it is Jayamohan's sister-in-law who wins the heart of the fugitive.

Vikrman was in prison as he had murdered the people who had raped his lover. He was still in search of the main culprit Bhadran. Vikrman makes peace with Menon and slowly but steadily transforms into a police inspector. He manages to win the heart of Valsala and even the kids of Jayamohan accept him as their father. He finds the truth behind Jayamohan's murder and brings Lion C. Menon to the hands of law. In the process, he manages to win friends like Rahim and eliminate his old enemy Bhadran.

== Cast ==
- Mohanlal in a dual role as
  - Sub-Inspector Jayamohan
  - Vikraman
- Urvashi as Valsala
- M. G. Soman as Inspector General B. G. Menon IPS
- T. G. Ravi as Lion C. Menon
- Balan K. Nair as Rahim
- K. P. A. C. Azeez as Gopinath
- Poojappura Ravi as Kuttan Pillai
- Aranmula Ponnamma as B. G. Menon's sister
- Chitra as Amminikutty
- Unnimary as Sarada
- C. I. Paul as Bhadran
- Baby Chaithanya

== Soundtrack ==
The film features songs composed by Darsan Raman and background score by K. J. Joy.

The film was a commercial success
