= Yaaruku Yaaro =

- Directed by: Joe Stanley
- Written by: Joe Stanley
- Starring: Sam Anderson; Jothi; Varnika
- Cinematography: Amarnath
- Edited by: Joe Stanley
- Music by: Joe Stanley
- Production company: Universal Thavamani Cine Arts
- Release date: 28 December 2007
- Running time: 115 minutes
- Country: India
- Language: Tamil

Yaaruku Yaaro (transl. Somebody for someone else) is a 2007 Indian Tamil-language romantic drama film written, scored and directed by Joe Stanley. The film stars Sam Anderson, Jothi, and Varnika in their first film roles. The film released on 28 December 2007.

The film and its lead actor gained notoriety following its upload on YouTube. The film has been mocked and criticized for its poor filmmaking and acting. It has been subject to several online memes. Sam Anderson went on to appear in films as a supporting comedy actor.

== Plot ==
The story opens with Deepa (Varnika), a medical college student, singing at a cultural festival. The next scene shifts to three robbers ogling Deepa. She is on her way to sit for her college examinations, but while wheeling her punctured scooter, the robbers snatch her chain and escape. David (Sam Anderson) chases after them on a scooter. He returns empty-handed and recognizes Deepa from the earlier college function. He praises her amazing vocal skills and gives his gold crucifix chain as a gift. Deepa refuses and does the same when David then gives a sermon about the Hindu-Christian difference.

The next day, David goes to Deepa's house. He overhears her singing a devotional song and stands mesmerized by her voice. He asks Deepa to return his tyre. Deepa informs him that her scooter has been sent for service. David also impresses her mother with his gentlemanly manners. The scene then shifts to David's confrontation with the robbers, who are also the accomplices of his father's best friend (Vennira Aadai Moorthy), a moneylender. David begins a sermon on the crucifix's greatness and offers it to the robbers to cleanse their sins. The robbers have a dramatic change of heart and praise David as their savior. They also give back the chain they stole from Deepa. Deepa learns that David is an automobile engineer and visits his workshop, seeing "high-end models" specifically designed by him. David then returns Deepa's chain. He also presents the crucifix along with her chain. David and Deepa then fall in love. Deepa's mother is concerned that her daughter might be tricked into love by David. Deepa consoles her and praises David's manners.

Meanwhile, the robbers turn over a new leaf and begin to work in David's workshop. As luck would have it, Deepa's father owns a car showroom. Deepa takes David to her father the next day. David then proposes his idea, but Deepa's father scoffs at it, leaving David heartbroken. David then requests a car poster that is posted on the office wall. Deepa's father tells him that the new customer car is to be sold in the showroom, and refuses. David then leaves the office, dejected. Deepa gets angry at her father for his treatment of David and rushes out to console him. Then David is shown at his workshop, where his mechanics console him and make a plan to ask the moneylender for a loan. Meanwhile, Deepa's father expresses his fear to his wife that Deepa will fall in love with David. The next day, David goes to the moneylender's house along with his faithful mechanics to ask for a loan. The moneylender promises to help him out by funding two of his model cars.

The next day, the moneylender visits David's workshop, but, upon seeing the reality, changes his mind and refuses to lend him money. David is heartbroken, but Deepa visits him and consoles him. She presents him with the Ferrari poster and asks him to marry her. She also plans to use her money (500,000 rupees) to help David out. Soon, David's birthday comes up, and Deepa plans a big surprise for him. However, everyone is in for a huge surprise as Manju (Jothi) comes from Canada to visit David, who is happy to see her. It is revealed that Manju was David's sweetheart during their college days, but they had a falling out because she went to Canada to pursue her career. She also says that she came back to India to take David with her to Canada. Suddenly, Deepa enters the room and gets angry at David for flirting with another woman. She leaves the room fuming. David tries to stop her, but she does not listen.

Manju takes David out for lunch and learns about his life after college and his new love Deepa. She gets angry at him for not treating Deepa properly, but she also feels sorry for him and soon falls prey to his charms. Manju asks David to marry her and plans their migration to Canada. She then asks David to forget about Deepa and return her money. David then asks his sidekicks for advice. He then visits Deepa and asks for her forgiveness. Deepa gets angry with his behavior and scorns him. Wounded, David comes back to his sidekicks, who advise him to jump for Manju instead. David then goes to Manju seeking refuge. Manju initially gets angry that David had not returned the check, but then suddenly declares her love for him. David and Manju stop their car in No-Man's Land and plan to go to the airport from there.

Out of nowhere, Deepa suddenly appears there on her motorcycle. She accuses David of using her just like the stepney tyre shown at the beginning. David then explains that he never used her but always thought of her as his stepping stone to success. Deepa refuses to be consoled and gives back the gold crucifix chain to David. She then leaves the place with sorrow. Manju gets angry with David again and asks him to give the chain to whoever he likes. David then puts the chain around Manju's neck. Manju takes it as the holy thaali and says that she is now all his.

David and Manju circle the car they came in three times. This scene symbolically indicates that the marriage of David and Manju has been made in heaven, as in actual marriages, marked by the circling of the holy fire thrice. The next scene shows a cargo plane taking off, presumably carrying David and Manju to Canada.

== Cast ==
- Sam Anderson as David
- Jothi as Manju
- Varnika as Deepa
- Vennira Aadai Moorthy as Moneylender
- Pandu as David's friend
- Bayilvan Ranganathan as Robber
- Suruli Manohar
- LIC Narasimhan
- Kambam Arasan
- Maruthi Sriram
- Hosur Senthil

== Soundtrack ==
The music was composed by Joe Stanley.

Track listing
No.	Title	Singer(s)	Length
1.	"Anbe Iraivan"	Hemambika
2.	"Nenjam Magizhum"	T. L. Thyagarajan, Praveena
3.	"Raasathi" (duet)	T. L. Thyagarajan, Praveena
4.	"Raasathi" (techno)
5.	"Vaazhga Vaazhgave"	Praveena
6.	"Mel Vaanil"	T. L. Thyagarajan, Hemambika

== In popular culture ==
The song "Raasathi" is played in the background in Goa (2010) when Ramarajan (Vaibhav) asks Vinayagam (Jai) for a towel in English.

In Thalaivaa (2013), Meera (Amala Paul) lies to Vishwa (Vijay) that she her husband is Sam Anderson. After Vishwa finds out that she isn't actually married, he calls Sam Anderson, who comes to meet them since he came to Australia for shooting. The song "Raasathi" is also featured.
