= Loku Kudla =

Indian poet and lyricist

- Born: Moodbidri
- Occupations: Lyricist, Director

Loku Kudla (born 27 January 1988) is an Indian poet and lyricist working in the Tulu film industry.
