= Manu Ramesan =

Indian film composer (born 1982)

- Born: 13 July 1982 (age 44)
- Occupations: Composer; music producer
- Years active: 2008–present
- Spouse: Uma Manu (m. 2010; died 2021)
- Children: 1
- Parents: S. Ramesan Nair; P. Rema
- Musical career
- Genres: Film score, world music
- Label: Manu Ramesan Productions

Manu Ramesan (born 13 July 1982) is an Indian film composer who works predominantly in Malayalam cinema. He is the son of lyricist S. Ramesan Nair. He has composed songs for films such as Pidichirukku (2008), Gulumal: The Escape (2009) and Plus Two (2010) (2010). The songs he composed for the movie Ayal Njanalla received rave reviews.

== Personal life ==
Manu is the son of Malayalam lyricist S. Ramesan Nair and P. Rema. On 6 June 2010, he married Uma, an assistant professor in the Computer Science department of Amrita School of Arts and Sciences, Kochi. They have a daughter, Mayika Devi, born on 19 August 2014. Uma died on 17 March 2021 due to stroke. Just three months later, on 18 June 2021, Manu lost his father to COVID-19.

== Discography ==
Year	Title	Language	Notes
2008	Pidichirukku	Tamil	
2009	Kavya's Diary	Telugu	
2009	Gulumal: The Escape	Malayalam	
2010	Mazha	Malayalam	album
2010	Plus Two	Malayalam	
2012	Raattinam	Tamil	
2014	Ettuthikkum Madhayaanai	Tamil	
2014	8.20	Malayalam	Background score
2014	Nangeli	Malayalam	album
2015	Ayal Njanalla	Malayalam	
2019-2022	The Premier Padmini	Malayalam	web series
2020	Shakeela	Malayalam	short film
2024	Njan Kandatha Sare	Malayalam	
2026	Dark	Tamil	
