= Kerala State Film Award – Special Mention =

Annual Indian film award

The Kerala State Film Award – Special Mention is an annual award presented at the Kerala State Film Awards of India.

== Recipients ==
Year	Recipient(s)	Awarded as	Film	Ref.
2001	M. V. Vinayakumar; V. M. Unnikrishnan	Director; Producer	Changathikuttam	
2002	Bhavana	Actress	Nammal	
2002	Vishnu	Child actor	Punarjani	
2004	Mamukkoya	Actor	Perumazhakkalam	
2004	Kunchacko Boban	Actor	Ee Snehatheerathu	
2004	Liji J. Pullappally	Director	Sancharam	
2005	Dileep	Actor	Chanthupottu	
2005	Arjun Lal	Actor	Thanmathra	
2005	Guinness Pakru	Actor	Athbhutha Dweepu	
2006	Sreenivasan	Actor	Thakarachenda	
2006	Khushbu	Actress	Kaiyoppu	
2006	Madhu Kaithapram	Director	Ekantham	
2007	Jagathy Sreekumar	Actor	Paradesi; Veeralipattu; Arabikkatha	
2007	T. G. Ravi	Actor	Adayalangal; Ottakayyan	
2008	K. M. Madhusudhanan	Director	Bioscope	
2010	Vipin Vijay	Director	Chithrasoothram	
2010	Premlal	Director	Athma Kadha	
2011	Prajith	Child actor	Adimadhyantham	
2012	G. Sreeram	Singer	Celluloid	
2012	Vaikom Vijayalakshmi	Singer	Celluloid	
2012	Saritha Kukku	Actress	Papilio Buddha	
2013	Suresh Unnithan	Director	Ayaal	
2013	Sanusha	Actress	Zachariayude Garbhinikal	
2013	Afzal Yusuf	Composer	Immanuel; God for Sale	
2013	Kalabhavan Shajon	Actor	Drishyam	
2014	M. G. Swara Sagar	Singer	Manal Chithrangal	
2014	George Mathew	Producer	Apothecary	
2014	Yakzan Gary Pereira	Composer	Iyobinte Pusthakam	
2014	Neha Nair	Composer	Iyobinte Pusthakam	
2014	Indrans	Actor	Apothecary	
2015	Joy Mathew	Actor	Mohavalayam	
2015	Joju George	Actor	Oru Second Class Yathra; Lukka Chuppi	
2015	Sreya Jayadeep	Singer	Amar Akbar Anthony	
2016	Surabhi Lakshmi	Actress	Minnaminungu	
2016	E. Santhosh Kumar	Storywriter	Aaradi	
2016	Girish Gangadharan	Cinematographer	Guppy	
2016	A. Chandrasekhar	Author	Haritha Cinema	
2017	Vijay Menon	Actor	Hey Jude	
2017	Master Ashanth K. Shah	Child actor	Lalibela	
2017	Master Chandrakiran G. K.	Child actor	Athishayangalude Venal	
2017	Joby A. S.	Actor	Mannamkattayum Kariyilayum	
2017	Rashmi G.	Author(Article)	Vellithirayile 'Laingikatha' Kamanakalude/Kambolathinte Rashtriyam	
2017	Anil Kumar K. S.	Author (Article)	Vellithirayile 'Laingikatha' Kamanakalude/Kambolathinte Rashtriyam	
2018	Santhosh Mandoor	Director	Pani	
2018	Sanal Kumar Sasidharan	Director	Chola	
2018	Sanal Kumar Sasidharan	Sound Design	Chola	
2018	K. P. A. C. Leela	Actress	Roudram 2018	
2018	N. V. Muhammad Rafi	Author (Book)	Kanyakayude Dhurnadappukal	
2018	Sunil C. E.	Author (Article)	Malayala Cinemayum Novelum	
2018	Rajesh K. Erumeli	Author (Article)	Maranavum Marananantharavum Jeevanukalodu Parayunnathu	
2019	V. Dakshinamoorthy	Music director	Shyamaragam	
2019	Nivin Pauly	Actor	Moothon	
2019	Anna Ben	Actress	Helen	
2019	Priyamvada Krishnan	Actress	Thottappan	
2020	Siji Pradeep	Acting	Bharathapuzha	
2020	Nanjiyamma	Singing	Ayyappanum Koshiyum	
2020	Nalini Jameela	Costume	Bharathapuzha	
2021	Jeo Baby	Direction	Freedom Fight	
2022	Biswajith S.	Direction	Iravarambu	
2022	Rarish G. Kurup	Direction	Vettapattikalum Ottakkarum	
2023	K. R. Gokul	Acting	Aadujeevitham	
2023	Sudhi Kozhikode	Acting	Kaathal - The Core	
2023	Krishnan	Acting	Jaivam	
2023	Arun Chandu	Direction	Gaganachari	
2024	Tovino Thomas	Acting	A. R. M.	
2024	Asif Ali	Acting	Kishkindha Kaandam	
2024	Darshana Rajendran	Acting	Paradise	
2024	Jyothirmayi	Acting	Bougainvillea	
2024	Anto Chitillapally, Sanita Chittillapally	Film	Paradise	

== See also ==
- Kerala State Film Award – Special Jury Award
