= Nalini Jameela =

Indian writer

- Born: 18 August 1954 (age 72); Kallur village, Thrissur, India
- Occupations: sex worker Sex work activist Author
- Notable work: Autobiography of a Sex Worker (2005); Romantic Encounters of a Sex Worker (2018)
- Awards: Kerala State Film Special Jury Award

Nalini Jameela (born 18 August 1954) is an Indian best selling author, sex worker activist and former sex worker from Thrissur, Kerala. She is the author of the books The Autobiography of a Sex-worker (2005) and Romantic Encounters of a Sex Worker (2018). She is the coordinator of the Sex Workers Forum of Kerala (SWFK) and is a member of five non-governmental organisations (NGO). She received Special Jury mention at the 51st Kerala State Film Awards for costume design for her work in the film, Bharatha Puzha (film).

== Early life ==
Nalini Jameela was born c. 1954 in Kallur village, Thrissur, India. She had left school after the 3rd grade when she was about seven. In the 1990s she furthered her education at the Kallur Government School, eventually reaching the 12th grade. She worked in the fields planting and harvesting crops until her husband died of cancer when she was aged 24. This left her with no means of supporting her two young children. A sex worker named Rosechechi introduced her to sex work. Rosechechi arranged her first client, a senior police officer, and she met him in a guesthouse in Trissur that was frequented by politicians. When leaving the guesthouse in the morning she was arrested by the police and beaten.

== Works ==
=== Autobiography of a Sex Worker ===
In 2005 Jameela wrote the autobiographical book Oru Lyngikathozhilaliyude Atmakatha (Autobiography of a Sex Worker) with the aid of sex work activist I. Gopinath. The book sold 13,000 copies, ran to six editions within 100 days of publication. Originally written in Malayalam, the book was translated to English in 2007 by J. Devika, and into French the following year by Sophie Bastide-Foltz. The book created massive movements in society, and led to many debates and controversies in Kerala. The book was condemned by feminists, who claimed it glorified sex work, and by conservatives who thought the subject should not be publicised.

=== Romantic Encounters of a Sex Worker ===
In 2018 Jameela's second book Romantic Encounters of a Sex Worker was published. The book was translated into English by Reshma Bharadwaj, and also translated into Gujarati, Bengali and Tamil. The book includes eight stories from the 1970s to the 2000s, telling of the relationships she developed with her clients.

In 2001 she became coordinator of the Sex Workers Forum of Kerala (SWFK), Under her leadership the SWFK held protest marches to draw attention to the plight of street-based sex workers.

Jameela is a member of the five non-governmental organisations (NGO). At the fourth meeting of the AIDS Counselling Program in Bengaluru, she called on the government not just to distribute condoms, but to provide an education to sex workers and their children.

== Documentary ==
Sanjeev Sivan, younger brother of noted film director Santosh Sivan, made a 28-minute documentary film, Sex, Lies and a Book, in 2013 about Jameela's life. The documentary was a joint venture of the United Nations Development Programme (UNDP) and the Public Service Broadcasting Trust. Jameela appeared in the film.

== See also ==
- Prostitution in India
- Sex workers' rights
- Women in India
