= Endosulfan tragedy in Kerala =

Disaster in India caused by pesticide endosulfan

A series of health problems occurred in Kerala, India, following the use of the pesticide endosulfan, which was sprayed aerially in cashew orchards in Kasaragod district of Kerala to control pests such as tea mosquito bugs. It was found that people living in these areas were affected by physical and genetic problems after the application of this pesticide. The health effects of the endosulfan use were evident in the people of 11 panchayats in the district, with the victims suffering from birth defects, physical and intellectual disabilities, and gynecological problems. It also affected biodiversity of the region.

In April 2011, the Persistent Organic Pollutants Review Committee, a subsidiary body to the Stockholm Convention declared endosulfan molecule as a persistent organic pollutant. One reason for this declaration was a campaign launched by various stakeholders in the context of the health problems seen in Kasaragod.

== Overview ==
During 1963–64, the Agriculture Department started planting cashews in the hills around Padre, which is now in Kasaragod district. In 1978, the plantations were taken over by Plantation Corporation of Kerala (PCK), a subsidiary of the Kerala government.

Endosulfan is an organochlorine insecticide and acaricide, which acts by blocking the GABA-gated chloride channel of the insect (IRAC group 2A). Endosulfan was aerially sprayed over the cashew orchards under the Plantation Corporation, in 1978, after a trial in 1977–78. It was used to control the tea mosquito bugs that affects cashews. Endosulfan was sprayed from helicopters three times a year. Later, it was found that people living in these areas were affected by physical and genetic problems after the application of this pesticide. These health problems have been reported mostly in panchayats like Enmakaje, Bellur, Kumbadaje, Pullur and Periye in Kasaragod district of Kerala. It is said that after almost 20 years of continuous aerial spraying of endosulfan pesticide in these panchayats, the local residents started succumbing to various diseases and deaths.

== Consequences ==
In 1981, Sripadre, an independent environmental journalist, first exposed the consequences of the large-scale use of the pesticide endosulfan by reporting on various disorders among domestic animals in areas sprayed with the pesticide. On December 25, 1981, Evidence Weekly published a report on cows giving birth to calves with deformed limbs after aerial spraying of endosulfan in Enmakaje.

It was later discovered that the use of endosulfan also had a significant impact on humans. The health effects of the spraying of endosulfan were evident in the people of 11 panchayats in the district, with the victims suffering from birth defects, physical disabilities, intellectual disability, cancer, and gynecological problems. Similar to Kerala, the same health problems are now being seen in the South Canara district of Karnataka, where the Karnataka Cashew Development Corporation aerially sprayed endosulfan on cashew orchards for over 20 years. Since 1995, 500 deaths have been officially recognized as being related to the spraying of endosulfan.

Following widespread public opposition, in 1998, the Kerala government temporarily suspended aerial spraying of endosulfan. In February 2001, a government-appointed team from the Kerala Agricultural University recommended an immediate halt to aerial spraying. Government imposed a permanent ban of this pesticide following a lower court ruling in 2001. In January 2002, the National Institute of Occupational Health released a report stating that they had found traces of endosulfan in water samples and blood samples collected from the village of Padre. A study published in 2018 found that endosulfan residues persist in Kasaragod soil even 20 years after its use was stopped.

In 2001, following media reports that spraying of the pesticide endosulfan in Kasaragod district had caused serious health problems, the National Human Rights Commission (NHRC) asked the Indian Council of Medical Research to study the matter and submit a report in July. In 2002, one of its constituent institutions, the National Institute of Occupational Health (NIOH), conducted a study on the subject and reported that the prevalence of the disease was higher in these areas. Following this, the commission urged the central government to impose a ban on endosulfan across India.

Although India government opposed a global ban of endosulfan, in April 2011, the Persistent Organic Pollutants Review Committee declared endosulfan molecule as a persistent organic pollutant. One reason for this declaration was the campaign launched by various stakeholders in the context of the health problems seen in Kasaragod.

The Kerala State Health and Family Welfare Department classified 6278 individuals suffering from various types of diseases as "endosulfan victims" and the deaths that occurred in the said areas at that time as "endosulfan poisoning victims". In this way, all those suffering from various diseases caused by endosulfan were included in the list of victims and they were provided with financial assistance, monthly pension, free ration, free treatment, housing and many other facilities. In 2006, the government distributed Rs.50,000 each to the dependents of 135 persons who died of endosulfan.

The spraying of endosulfan in cashew orchards has also caused significant damage to the biodiversity of the area, according to a study conducted by Dr. V.S. Vijayan of the Salim Ali Foundation. A rapid survey conducted by Vijayan and his team indicated that the use of the pesticide resulted in a 40 to 70 percent reduction in plant diversity in the area, and it affected native species, especially fish, being the most. Studies have also found declines in numbers and distribution of butterflies, which are considered biological indicators of healthy and diverse ecosystems.

== Objections ==
There is controversy over whether endosulfan is the main cause of health problems in these areas. One argument is that it has not been proven that these diseases are more prevalent in Kasaragod than in other areas. It is also said that diseases that have nothing to do with endosulfan are also being attributed to it.

Scientist and head of the Department of Agricultural Entomology at Kerala Agricultural University, Dr. K. M. Sreekumar has spoken out strongly about the unscientific nature of the endosulfan disaster claims. Sreekumar says that the child with the enlarged head, which is said to be caused by endosulfan, was due to a disease called hydrocephalus, and that it can be caused by various reasons, such as difficulties during normal childbirth, problems that occur when two children are born together, etc. He adds that there is not even a research paper yet that this is caused by endosulfan. He says that these patients are present in areas where endosulfan has been sprayed and in areas where endosulfan has not been used so far, and that all types of diseases that have been shown to be caused by endosulfan in Kasaragod district are similar. He points out that while health workers are identifying patients who say they are due to endosulfan, there is a lack of clinical or biochemical evidence to confirm that these illnesses are a result of endosulfan.

Although a study by Calicut Medical College spot a high incidence of disease in Kasargod, according to a critique by Sreekumar and fellow entomologist Prathapan Divakaran, published in the journal Current Science, the levels of endosulfan in the blood of patients in the Calicut Medical College study appeared to have no correlation with the health of these patients.

== Legal actions ==
Leela Kumari Amma, an agricultural officer from village of Pullur in Kasaragod, was the first to approach the court regarding endosulfan ban. On October 18, 1998, she filed a case in the Hosdurg Munsif Court demanding a halt to the spraying of endosulfan, and the court issued an interim order not to spray endosulfan in that area. When the Munsif Court order came, the Plantation Corporation moved the case to the Kanhangad Sub Court, but she won there too. After that, the Corporation moved straight to the High Court, but rejecting this, in 2000, the Kerala High Court upheld the lower court's order and permanently stopped the spraying of endosulfan. In 2011, Supreme Court of India banned production, sale and use of Endosulfan in the country till further orders.

In January 2017, the Supreme Court of India ordered state government to give a compensation of Rs 5 lakh each to the victims of endosulfan. In May 2022, after the government failed to distribute compensation to everyone even after five years of the order, Supreme Court has strongly criticized the state government for delaying the distribution of compensation to endosulfan victims.

The Supreme Court had ordered in 2017 that adequate medical facilities should be provided to endosulfan victims. However, following a contempt petition filed in the Supreme Court in 2021 alleging that the state had failed to implement this, the Kerala High Court directed the Kasaragod District Legal Services Authority (DLSA) to submit a detailed report on the medical and palliative care facilities for endosulfan victims in the district.

== In popular culture ==
Arajeevithangalkkoru swargam (English: A Paradise for Half Lives) is a documentary film directed by M. A. Rahman that highlights the seriousness of the Endosulfan disaster. Produced by 'Greenfox' under the leadership of K.M.K. Kunjabdulla, the documentary began shooting in 1999 and was completed in 2002. A Pestering Journey, directed by K. R. Manoj, is another documentary based on this tragedy. This documentary was also submitted before the Supreme Court of India as evidence in the Endosulfan case.

Enmakaje (Translated as Swarga in English), a novel written by Ambikasuthan Mangad is based on the Endosulfan tragedy in Kasaragod. Valiya Chirakulla Pakshikal (English: Birds with Large Wings), a 2015 Malayalam drama film written and directed by Dr. Biju is also based on this incident. Pakarnnattam, directed by Jayaraj is also based on this incident.
