= J. Devika =

Indian historian (born 1968)

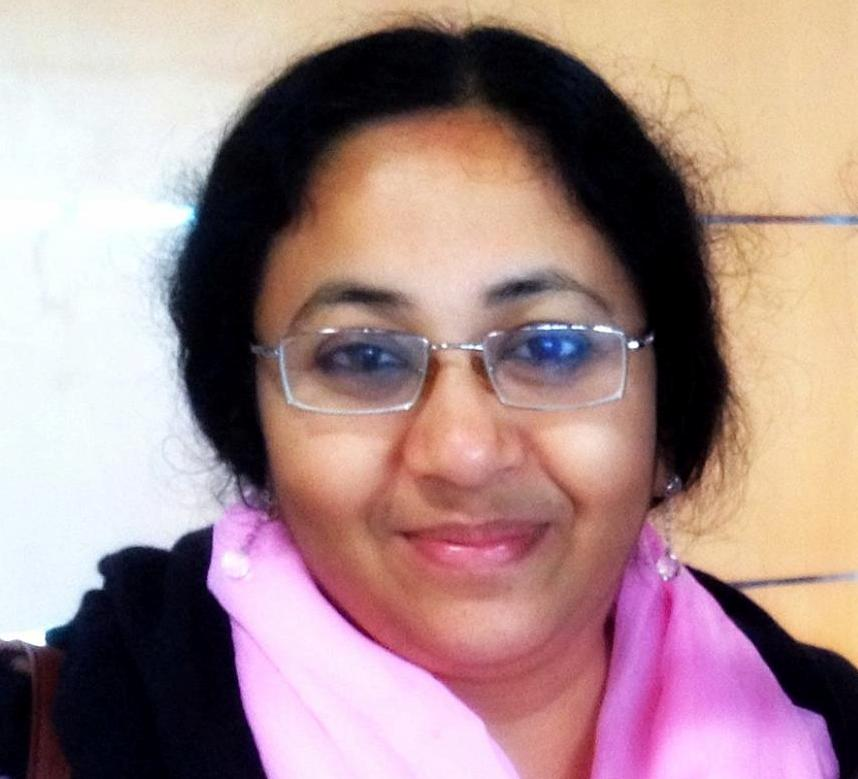
- Born: 6 May 1968 (age 58); Kollam, Kerala, India
- Occupation: Professor
- Writing career
- Genres: Women's studies, sociology, history
- Notable work: Kulasthreeyum Chanthappennum Undayathengane
- Movement: Feminism
- Website: swatantryavaadini.in

Jayakumari Devika (born 6 May 1968) is a Malayali historian, feminist, social critic and academic from Kerala. She currently researches and teaches at the Centre for Development Studies, Thiruvananthapuram as a professor. She has authored several books and articles on gender relations in early Kerala society. She is bilingual and has translated both fiction and non-fiction books between Malayalam and English. She also writes on gender, politics, social reforms and development in Kerala on publications like Kafila, Economic and Political Weekly and The Wire.

== Education ==
Devika did her Master of Arts in Modern History (1991) from Centre for Historical Studies, Jawaharlal Nehru University, New Delhi and obtained her Ph.D. in history from Mahatma Gandhi University, Kottayam.

== Writings ==
Devika's early research was about the emergence of modern binary gender as a language of describing society and social change in the early twentieth century in Kerala. In her later writings, she has followed the gendering of development in Kerala through a history of public consent for contraception between the 1930s and 1970. She has also published translations of writings by first-generation feminists in Kerala in the book Her Self: Early Writings on Gender by Malayalee Women 1898–1938. In her later research, Devika explores contemporary political and social issues through a historical lens and her concerns are wider than gender, and rather, focus on intersectional power. Her later books have been about gender and politics in twentieth century Kerala, and about the gendered history of the Malayali literary public.

She has published an introduction to feminist theory that places it within the history of modern western thought, titled Streevadam, and published in 2000. In her book Kulasthreeyum Chanthappennum Undaayathengine? she gives an alternative reading of Kerala history from the feminist perspective. She traces Kerala's social and political history and providing interesting insights. For example, she explains how dress code of saree and dowry became prevalent in Kerala. The Hindu reports in their review "Authored by J. Devika, Associate Professor at the CDS, the book is an incisive take on the invisible spaces to which women have been consigned in conventional history and reaches out to the silent depths where women's powerful actions and articulations of the past lay buried. The book, an attempt to centre-stage women in Kerala history, looks how false notions about women got reinforced in the public mind because of the accounts in the "neutral" history texts, how freedom has eluded Kerala women despite their high educational entitlements and what role they have played in major historical junctures.". Her work in this area also includes the 2007 book Engendering Individuals: The Language of Re-Forming in Early Twentieth Century Keralam, and the 2008 book Individuals, Householders, Citizens: Malayalis and Family Planning, 1930–1970.

Devika has translated number of books from Malayalam to English. Notable among them are the translation of Nalini Jameela's autobiography and the short stories of K. R. Meera and Sarah Joseph. She also translated the well acclaimed Malayalam novel, Arrachar by K. R. Meera into English as Hangwoman in 2014. In 2017, She translated the Malayalam novel, Enmakaje by Ambikasuthan Mangad into English as Swarga.

She has published several essays in academic journals published from within and outside India, delivered several talks around the world and written extensively on contemporary issues in Malayalam and English. Devika also writes extensively in Malayalam, in contemporary publications.She has also written for children, and her work was published by the Kerala Shastra Sahitya Parishat

She also has a website about the first generation Malayalee feminists called Swatantryavaadini.

== Publications ==
=== Books in English ===
- (Jointly with Binitha V Thampi) New Lamps for Old? Gender Paradoxes of Political Decentralization in Kerala, Zubaan, New Delhi, 2012.
- Individuals, Householders, Citizens: Malayalees and Family Planning, 1930s–1970′, Zubaan, New Delhi, 2008.
- En-Gendering Individuals: The Language of Re-forming in Early 20th Century Keralam, Orient Longman, Hyderabad, 2007.

=== Books in Malayalam ===
- Navasiddhantangal: Streevadam(New Theory Series: Feminism), D.C Books: Kottayam, Kerala, 2000.
- NirantharaPrathipaksham: J DevikaudeLekhanangal 2004–2018 (Selected Essays in Malayalam), Kottayam: DC Books, forthcoming, 2021.
- PauriyuteNottangal (Woman-Citizen's Eye-view), Olive Books: Kozhikode, 2013.
- (Ed.), AanarashunaatileKazhchakal: KeralamStreepakshaGaveshanattil (Sights from Male-dom: Kerala under Feminist Lenses), Women's Imprint, Thiruvananthapuram, 2006.
- PennorumbettaalLokanMaarunnu: LinganeethiyudeViplavangal, (The World Changed When Women Move: Gender-Revolutions), Thiruvananthapuram, Readme Books, 2017.

=== Journals ===
- Devika, J.; O Williams, Glyn; Omankuttan, U; Aasen, Berit (November 2018). "Enacting Participatory, Gender-Sensitive Slum Redevelopment? Urban governance, power and participation in Trivandrum, Kerala". Geoforum. 96: 150–159. doi:10.1016/j.geoforum.2018.07.021. S2CID 158709565 – via Elsevier Science Direct.
- Devika, J. (2012). "Rockets With Fire in Their Tails? Women Leaders in Kerala's Panchayats". India International Centre Quarterly. 39 (3/4): 42–53. JSTOR 24394274.
- Devika, J.; Thampi, Binitha V. (7 October 2010). "Mobility Towards Work and Politics for Women in Kerala State, India: A View from the Histories of Gender and Space". Modern Asian Studies. 45 (5): 1147–1175. doi:10.1017/S0026749X09000080. S2CID 145060617.
- Devika, J. (Spring 2014). "Getting beyond the Governmental Fix in Kerala". Signs: Journal of Women in Culture and Society. 39 (4): 580–584. doi:10.1086/674322. S2CID 146883803.
- Devika, J. (16 May 2019). "Women's Labour, Patriarchy and Feminism in Twenty-first Century Kerala: Reflections on the Glocal Present". Review of Development and Change. 24: 79–99. doi:10.1177/0972266119845940. S2CID 181610120.
- Devika, J. (2009). "Caregiver vs. Citizen? On ecofeminism in the context of Kerala state, India". Man in India. 89 (4): 751–769 – via Academia.edu.
- Devika, J. (20 August 2006). "Negotiating women's social space: public debates on gender in early modern Kerala, India". Inter-Asia Cultural Studies. 7: 43–61. doi:10.1080/14649370500463125. S2CID 144814707 – via Taylor & Francis Online.
- Devika, J. (June 2003). "Beyond Kulina and Kulata: The Critique of Gender Difference in the Writings of K. Saraswati Amma". Indian Journal of Gender Studies. 10 (2): 201–228. doi:10.1177/097152150301000202. S2CID 145734274 – via ResearchGate.

=== Translations ===
==== From Malayalam to English ====
- The Cock is the Culprit, by Unni R, Amazon-Westland, 2020.
- One Hell of a Lover and Other Stories by UnniR, Amazon-Westland, 2019.
- The Deepest Blue [English translation of KR Meera'sKarineela], in Mini Krishnan (ed.), The Oxford Book of Long Short Stories, New Delhi: OUP, 2017.
- 'He-ghoul', [translation of K R Meera’s 'Aanpretham'] for Shinie Antony (ed), Boo: 13 Stories that Will Send a Chill Down Your Spine, Penguin Random House, 2017.
- "Sweet offering at Chankranthy", by TKC Vadutala, in M Dasanet. al (eds) The Oxford Anthology of Malayalam Dalit Writing, New Delhi: OUP, 2012.
- Swarga, English translation of Ambikasuthan Mangad's Enmakaje: Published by Juggernaut Books (ISBN 9789386228215)

==== From English to Malayalam ====
- Samakaalika India: OruSamoohasastraavalokanam, KSSP: Thrissur, 2014. (Translation of SatishDeshpande's Contemporary India: A Sociological View )
- AkamePottiyaKettukalkkappuram: Indian FeminisathinteVarthamaanam(Malayalam version of NiveditaMenon'sSeeing like a Feminist, Penguin, N Delhi), SahityaPravarthakaSahakaranaSangham, 2017.
