= Kallen Pokkudan =

Indian author and activist

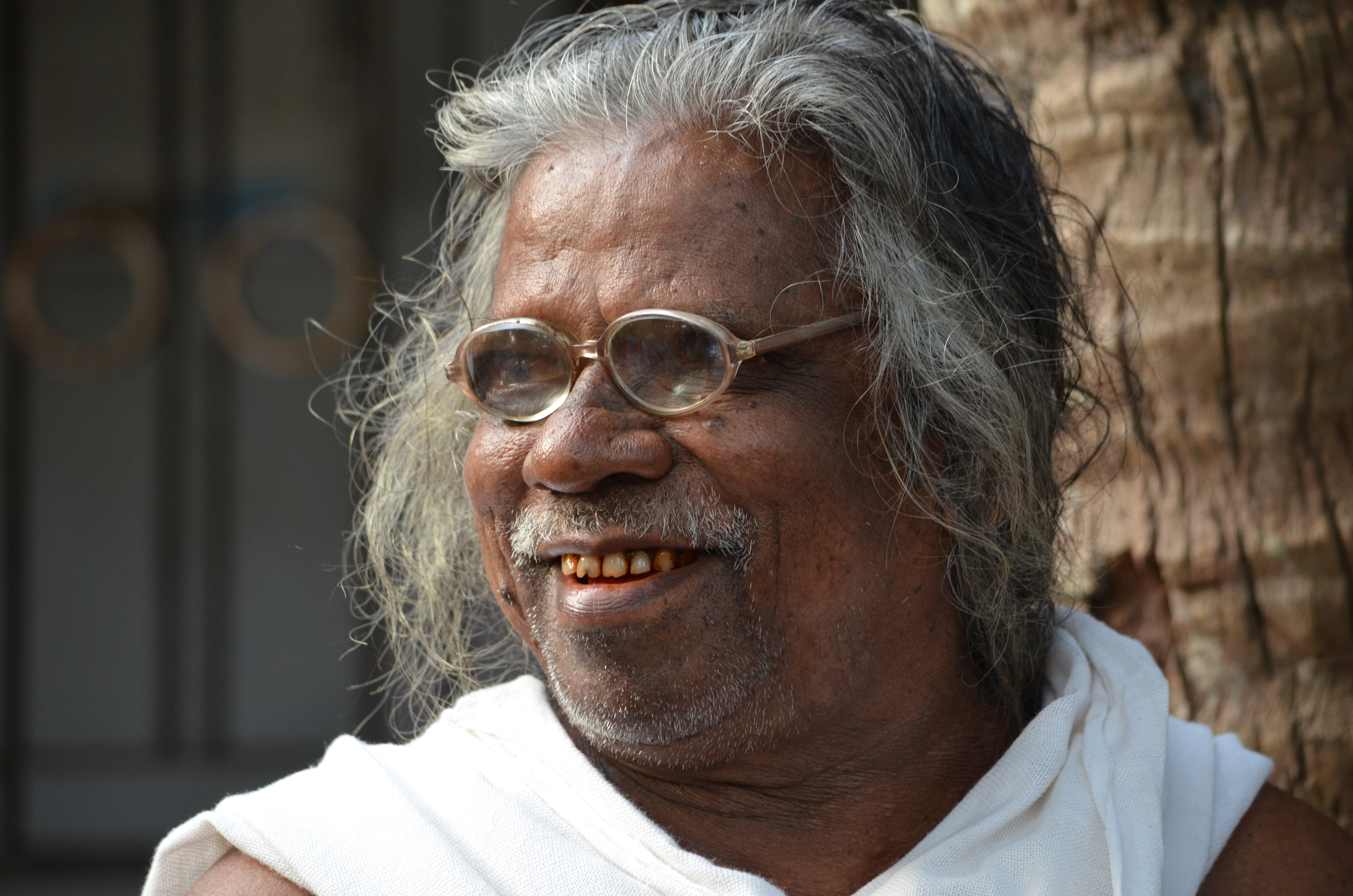
- Born: 1937; Pazhayangadi, Kannur, India
- Died: 27 September 2015 (aged 78); Cherukunnu, Kannur, Kerala, India
- Other name: Kandal Pokkudan
- Occupation: Environmental activist
- Known for: Protection of Mangrove forests
- Children: Three daughters and three sons
- Parent(s): Aringelyan Govindan Parotti; Kallen Vellachi
- Awards: P. V. Thampy Memorial Endowment Award; Vana Mitra Award; Haritha Vyakthi Award; P. S. Gopinathan Nair Environmental Award; A. V. Abdul Rahman Haji Award; Kannur University Acharya Award; Bala Sahitya Institute Award

Kallen Pokkudan (1937-2015), also known as Kandal Pokkudan, was an Indian environmental activist and writer from Kerala. He was known for his efforts for the protection and proliferation of the mangrove forests in Kerala, since 1989.

== Biography ==
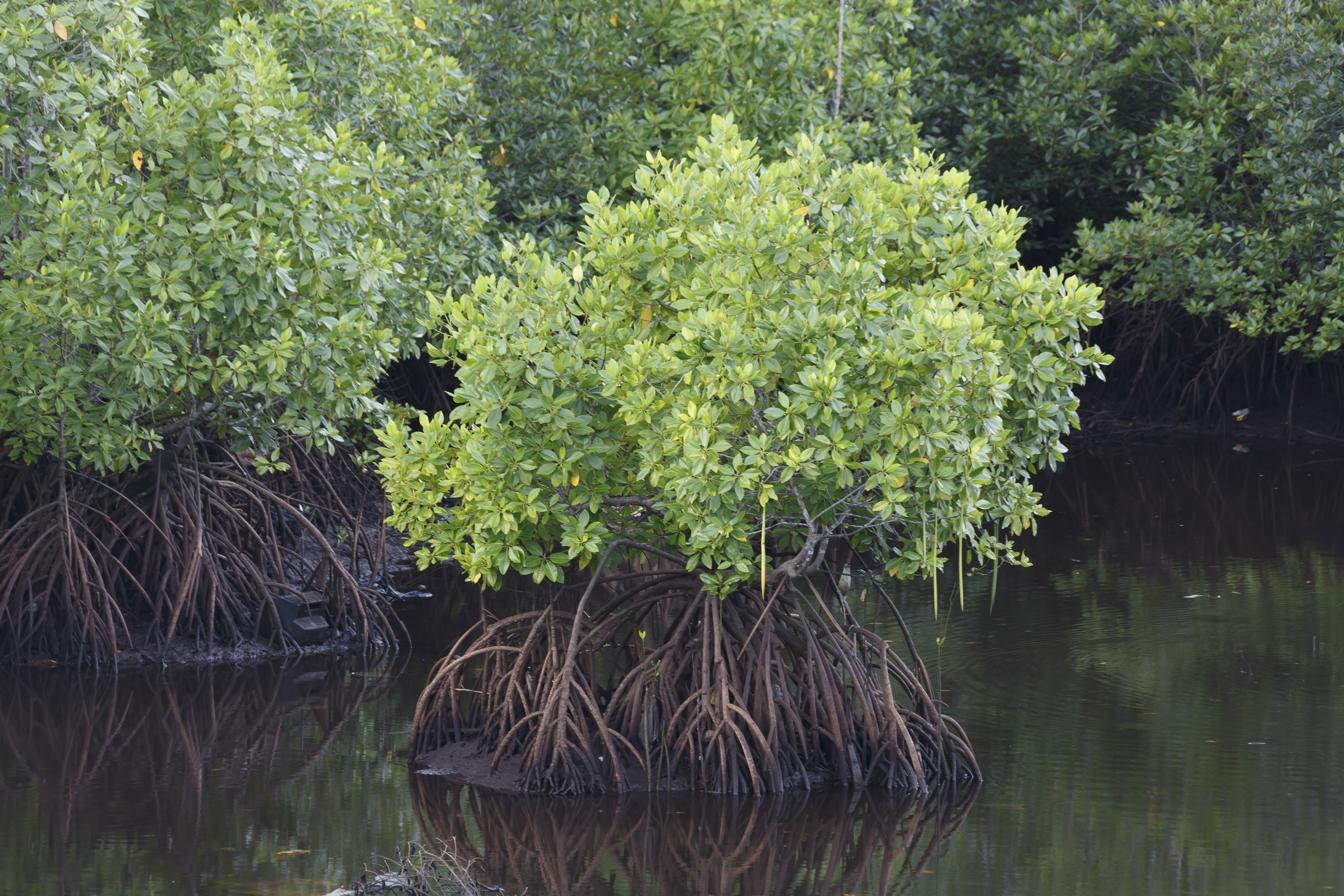
Mangrove vegetation

Pokkudan was born in 1937 at Iddukkil Thara, a hamlet in the remote village of Ezhom Moola, near Pazhayangadi, in Kannur district in the south Indian state of Kerala in a tribal family to Aringelayan Govindan Parotti and Kallen Vellachi. He had minimal education which extended only up to 2nd standard and he took to communism at the age of 18. He was more aligned to the radical group in the Communist Party of India, was involved in many people's movement and was arrested on many occasions. He was an accused in many cases related to farmers' unrests including a murder case and was incarcerated several times. When the party split in 1964, he took sides with the Communist Party of India (Marxist) but de-aligned from party ranks in the 1980s when he became disenchanted with them.

After his split with the party, Pokkudan spent his time in environmental protection activities, focusing on the protection of the mangrove forests of Kerala. He embarked on a mission to plant mangroves across the coastal waters of Kerala and is reported to have planted over one lakh (100,000) mangrove plants in the state. He founded the Mangrove School and conducted over 500 classes in various parts of the state in an attempt to educate the masses about the ecological importance of mangroves. His last work, Kandal Inangal (Mangrove Species) is a work detailing various species of mangroves found in Kerala. Sthalam, a 2012 film by Siva Prasad, has been made on the life of Pokkudan. He was one of the protagonists of Papilio Buddha, a 2013 feature film by Jayan Cherian, which focuses on the environmental and spiritual aspects of life.

Pokkudan was married to Meenakshi and the couple had three daughters, Pushpalatha, Pushpavalli and Rekha and three sons, Anandan, Raghunath and Sreejith. Sreejith Paithalen, the last born, is a freelance journalist and has ghost written two of his father's books. He died on 27 September 2015, aged 78, at Kannur, succumbing to age related illnesses, his wife preceding him in death, and was cremated at his residence at Pazhayangadi.

== Books ==
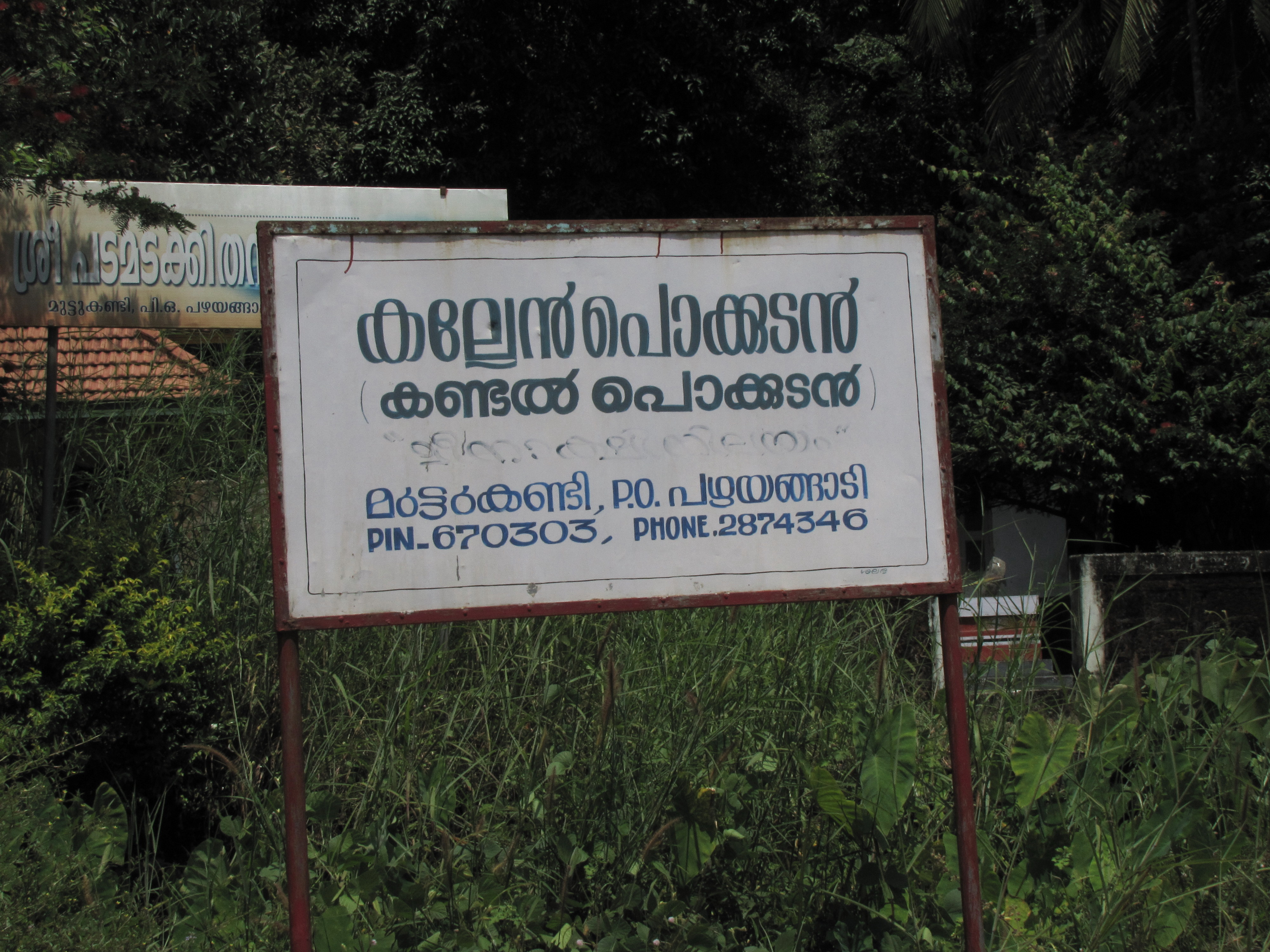
Muttu Kandy village is the native place of Kallen Pokkudan

Pokkudan had only basic literacy but he published several books, with assistance from others, including two autobiographical works, Ente Jeevitham (My Life) and Kandalkkadukalkkidayil Ente Jeevitham (My Life Among the Mangrove Forests). Kandal Inangal (Mangrove Species) and Chuttachi are two of his other notable works. His life has been documented in a biography, Pokkudan Ezhuthatha Aathmakatha (The Unwritten Autobiography of Pokkudan), written by Thaha Madayi and published by Samakalika Malayalam in 2003.

== Film on Pokkudan ==
A Malayalam film called Sthalam was made in 2011 based upon the life of Kallen Pokkudan. It was written and directed by Kaviyoor Sivaprasad.

== Awards ==
Pokkudan received the P. V. Thampy Memorial Endowment Award in 2001. Two years later, he was awarded the Bhoomi Mitra award followed by the Vana Mitra (Friend of Forests) Award of the Kerala Forests and Wildlife Department, in 2006, making him the first recipient of the honour. The Government of Kerala honoured him with the Haritha Vyakthi (Green Personality) Award in 2010. He won the P. S. Gopinathan Nair Environmental Award in 2014. He was also a recipient of the A. V. Abdul Rahman Haji award (2010), Acharya Award from Kannur University and Bala Sahitya Institute Award.

== See also ==
- Mangrove theme park, Kannur
- Sthalam
- Papilio Buddha
