= Sakhi Thomas =

Indian costume designer

Sakhi Elsa
- Education: Mar Ivanios College; National Institute of Fashion Technology
- Occupation: Costume designer
- Years active: 2009 – present
- Awards: Kerala State Film Awards(2018)

Sakhi Elsa, also known as Sakhi Thomas, is an Indian costume designer and fashion designer working predominantly for the Malayalam film industry.

== Early life ==
Sakhi completed her schooling in Sarvodaya Vidyalaya and Pre-University in Mar Ivanios College. Further she took her bachelor's degree in Commerce.

Pursuing her passion, in 2004 she completed her two-year post graduation course from National Institute of Fashion Technology in Knitwear Design & Technology.

Her collection titled ‘The Fragrance of a Dream’ (Mehak-E-Khwab) was spotlighted as the mid-way-opening collection of the 2004 Knitwear Design Show.

== Career ==
She has designed costumes for leading film actors including Mohanlal, Prakash Raj, Manisha Koirala, Nayanthara, Trisha, Dileep, Sreenivasan, Nivin Pauly, Dulquer Salmaan, Fahadh Faasil, Kunchacko Boban, Asif Ali, Suraj Venjaramoodu, Manoj K. Jayan, Biju Menon, Unni Mukundan, Prathap K. Pothan, K. P. A. C. Lalitha, Siddique, Saiju Kurup, Suhasini Maniratnam, Aju Varghese, Sameera Reddy, Samvrutha Sunil, Nithya Menon, Mamta Mohandas, Shwetha Menon, and Ann Augustine.

== Filmography ==
=== As costume designer ===
| Year | Film | Language | Director |
|---|---|---|---|
| 2009 | Kerala Cafe - Off Season | Malayalam | Shyamaprasad |
| 2010 | Oru Naal Varum | Malayalam | T. K. Rajeev Kumar |
| 2010 | Elektra | Malayalam | Shyamaprasad |
| 2011 | Violin | Malayalam | Sibi Malayil |
| 2012 | Second Show | Malayalam | Srinath Rajendran |
| 2012 | Thalsamayam Oru Penkutty | Malayalam | T. K. Rajeev Kumar |
| 2012 | Arike | Malayalam | Shyamaprasad |
| 2013 | 3 Dots | Malayalam | Sugeeth |
| 2013 | Crocodile Love Story | Malayalam | Anoop Ramesh |
| 2013 | Artist | Malayalam | Shyamaprasad |
| 2013 | Maad Dad | Malayalam | Revathy S Varmha |
| 2014 | John Paul Vaathil Thurakkunnu | Malayalam | Chandrahasan |
| 2014 | Vellimoonga | Malayalam | Jibu Jacob |
| 2015 | KL 10 Patthu | Malayalam | Muhsin parari |
| 2015 | Kaliyachan | Malayalam | Farook Abdul Rahiman |
| 2015 | Salt Mango Tree | Malayalam | Rajesh Nair |
| 2016 | Kattappanayile Rithwik Roshan | Malayalam | Nadirshah |
| 2017 | Hey Jude | Malayalam | Shyamaprasad |
| 2018 | Vallikudilile Vellakaaran | Malayalam | Duglus Alfred |
| 2020 | Kesu Ee Veedinte Nadhan | Malayalam | Nadirshah |
| 2020 | Thattasherikoottam | Malayalam | Anoop |

=== As lyricist ===
| Year | Film | Language | Director |
|---|---|---|---|
| 2020 | Thattasherikoottam | Malayalam | Anoop |

== Awards ==
Kerala State Film Award

- 2017 Kerala State Film Award for Best Costume Designer - Hey Jude
