= 43rd Kerala State Film Awards =

Annual Indian film awards ceremony

- Awarded for: Best of Malayalam Cinema in 2012
- Date: May 2013
- Location: Thiruvananthapuram
- Country: India
- Presented by: Kerala State Chalachitra Academy
- First award: 1969
- Website: http://www.keralafilm.com

The 43rd Kerala State Film Awards, recognizing excellence in Malayalam cinema for the year 2012, were announced in May 2013.

== Winners ==
Most Awards

Number of Awards	Films
7	Celluloid
4	Ayalum Njanum Thammil
3	Manjadikuru, Annayum Rasoolum

Name of Award	Awardee(s)	Name of Film	Remarks
Best Film	Kamal, Ubaid	Celluloid	
Second Best Film	Madhupal, P. N. Venugopal	Ozhimuri	
Best Director	Lal Jose	Ayalum Njanum Thammil	
Best Film with Popular Appeal and Aesthetic Value	Lal Jose, Prem Prakash	Ayalum Njanum Thammil	
Best Children's Film	No Award		
Best Actor	Prithviraj	Celluloid, Ayalum Njanum Thammil	
Best Actress	Rima Kallingal	22 Female Kottayam, Nidra	
Second Best Actor	Manoj K. Jayan	Kaliyachan	
Second Best Actress	Sajitha Madathil	Shutter	
Best Child Artists	Master Minon - Vyjayanthi	101 Chodyangal - Manjadikuru	
Best Comedian	Salim Kumar	Ayalum Njanum Thammil	
Best Debut Director	Farook Abdul Rahiman	Kaliyachan	
Best Cinematography	Madhu Neelakandan	Annayum Rasoolum	
Best Story	Manoj Kana	Chayilyam	
Best Screenplay	Anjali Menon	Manjadikuru	
Best Lyrics	Rafeeq Ahammed	Spirit	Mazhakondu Mathram
Best Music Director	M. Jayachandran	Celluloid	Kaatte Katte Nee
Best Background Music	Bijibal	Kaliyachan, Ozhimuri	
Best Male Singer	Vijay Yesudas	Spirit, Grandmaster	Mazhakondu Mathram, Akaleyo Nee
Best Female Singer	Sithara Krishnakumar	Celluloid	Enundodi Ambili Chantham
Best Dubbing Artist	Vimmi Mariam George	Nidra	for giving voice to Rima Kallingal
Best Choreography	No Award		
Best Costume Designer	S. P. Satheesh	Ozhimuri, Celluloid	
Best Makeup Artist	M. G. Roshan	Mayamohini	
Best Colourist	Jayadevan	Annayum Rasoolum	
Best Film Editor	B. Ajith Kumar	Annayum Rasoolum	
Best Sound Recordist	M. R. Rajakrishnan	Manjadikuru	
Best Art Director	Suresh Kollam	Celluloid	
Best Book on Cinema	K Gopinath	Cinemayude Nottangal	
Best Article on Cinema	Aju K. Narayanan & Cheri Jacob K.	Nirangalude Soundarya Rashtreeyangal	
Special Jury Award	Jayan K. Cherian - Kiran Raveendran	Papilio Buddha (film) - Sesham Vellithirayil	Director - Writer (Article on Cinema)
Special Mention	G. Sreeram, Vaikom Vijayalakshmi - Saritha	Celluloid - Papilio Buddha (film)	Singers (Kaatte Kaatte Nee) - Actress
Lifetime Achievement Awards	J. Sasikumar		Director

== See also ==
- National Film Awards
