= Thaha Madayi =

Thaha Madayi

Thaha Madayi (also spelt as Taha Madayi) is a freelance journalist/writer and biographer from Kerala, India, writing in Malayalam language. He began contributing to Balapankthi of Mathrubhumi weekly and has gone on to author many articles on significant topics, which appeared in leading Malayalam journals. He was instrumental in making visible Dalits and other marginalized groups through the literary genre of life-writing and has also published his interviews with many celebrities. He has made six documentary films and short films. He has presented cultural programs both on Radio and TV. He wrote the biographies of Kallen Pokkudan, Fabi Basheer, Gemini Shankaran, Mamukkoya, Punathil Kunjabdulla, Eranjoli Moosa, A Ayyappan and Captain Krishnan Nair.

He has written pieces for Malayalam weekly like Mathrubhumi and Madhyamam.

His interview with M.N. Vijayan was discussed in Kerala Cultural-Political scenario in a wider range. Thaha Madayi created a new branch in Malayalam literature called 'Jeevithamezhuth'(Life sketch). The work of Thaha Madayi was included into The Oxford India Anthology of Malayalam Dalit Writing published by Oxford University Press.

== Awards ==
His book Mamukkoya (2007) won him the best book award at the International Book Fair in Thiruvananthapuram, as also the Malayala Manorama Editors Choice Award and Basheerinte Ediye in their respective years of publication (2009).

== Major works ==
=== Books ===
1. Desame Desame Ivarude Jeevitha varthamanam kelkk
2. Nagna Jeevithangal
3. Mamukkoya
4. Jeevitham/Mamukkoya-Kozhikode
5. Daivathinum Kadalinum Madhye
6. Asoka Chottile Kunjunni
7. Zakariya Vathil Thurakunnu
8. Adhikaram, Anuragam, Athma Rahasyangal
9. Shareeram chila pularkala swapnangal
10. Punathilinte badal jeevitham
11. Kanneerinte kanakku pusthakam
12. Priyapetta sambhashanagal
13. Sathyan Anthikadinte Grameenam
14. Swapnadanam Cinemayum Jeevithavum
15. Jeevitham Padunna Gramaphone
16. 25 Asadharana Jeevithanagal
17. Kaari
18. Butterfly's park
19. Malakkam Mariyunna jeevitham
20. Krishna Leela
21. Mukham
22. Udo Baba

=== Short-films and documentaries ===
1. Anayupappa
2. Enikku pooviloode madanganam
3. Paattu krishi
