= Mandakini (2024 film) =

- Directed by: Vinod Leela
- Screenplay by: Vinod Leela
- Story by: Shiju M Bhaskar; Shalu
- Produced by: Sanju Unnithan
- Starring: Althaf Salim; Anarkali Marikar
- Cinematography: Shiju M Bhaskar
- Edited by: Sheril
- Music by: Bibin Ashok
- Distributed by: Spire Productions
- Release date: 24 May 2024
- Country: India
- Language: Malayalam

Mandakini is a 2024 Indian Malayalam-language film written and directed by Vinod Leela and produced by Sanju Unnithan under Spire Productions. It stars Althaf Salim, Anarkali Marikar, and Ganapathi S. Poduval in the lead roles. The film released on 24 May 2024.

== Plot ==
On her wedding night, Ambili accidentally consumes an alcoholic drink meant for her husband, Aromal. She then confesses her past relationship with Sujith Vasu. Her family confronts Sujith, who treated Ambili badly. After a series of events, Sujith is exposed and beaten, and Aromal expresses relief that Sujith will no longer be part of their lives.

== Cast ==
- Althaf Salim as Aromal
- Anarkali Marikar as Ambili
- Ganapathi S. Poduval as Sujith Vasu
- Vineeth Thattil David as Unni
- Saritha Kukku as Rajalakshmi
- Aswathy Sreekanth as Ajitha
- Kutty Akhil as Ani
- Jaffar Idukki as Sukeshan
- Lal Jose as Sudevan
- Ala S Nayana as Ambika
- Ajai Vasudev as Manoj
- Jeo Baby as Sagar
- Jude Anthany Joseph as SI Benny
- Resmi Anil as CID Sudha
- Guiness Vinod as Sajeevan
- Pradeesh Jacob as Amalesh
- Babitha Basheer as Sreekutty
- Nashid Noushad as Jithesh
- Priya Prakash Varrier as Akhila (cameo appearance)

== Production ==
The title poster of the film was released in March 2024. The production company announced the release date for 24 May 2024.
