= Saritha Kukku =

Indian actress

- Born: C P Saritha; 30 October 1983 (age 42); Kochi, Kerala, India
- Occupation: Actress
- Years active: 2012–present
- Children: 1
- Parent(s): Kunhikkannan & Karthiyayani
- Awards: Kerala State Film Award – Special Mention award in 2012 for acting in Papilio Buddha (film)

C P Saritha, better known as Saritha Kukku is an Indian actress who acts predominantly in Malayalam films. Saritha started her career in acting through the Satyajit Ray Film and Television Institute. Her debut in the Malayalam film industry was through a student production at the Satyajit Ray Film Institute. Her very first movie was the critically acclaimed Papilio Buddha (film).

== Filmography ==
Feature film As Actress
Year	Title	Role	Notes
2012	Papilio Buddha	Manju	Kerala State Film Award – Special Mention award in 2012 for acting.
2014	Iyobinte Pusthakam		
2015	Rani Padmini		
2015	Velutha Rathrikal		
2016	Dancing death		
2016	Elle		Tamil film
2017	Kaattu	Kochuparvathi	
2017	Namukkore Akkasham		
2018	Ka Bodyscapes		
2018	Aabhaasam		
2019	Sathyam Paranja Viswasikkuvo		
2019	Veyilmarangal		
2020	Vrithakrithyilulla chathuram - A minor inconvenience		
2020	Paapam Cheyyathavar Kalleriyatte		
2020	Pakshikalku Paryanullathu		
2021	Djibouti		
2023	Bharatha Circus	Roslin	
2023	Uravugal Thodarkathai		Tamil film
2024	Mandakini	Rajalakshmi	
2026	Ananthan Kaadu		Bilingual film
