= Enmakaje (novel) =

Malayalam novel

- Author: Ambikasuthan Mangad
- Translator: J. Devika (English)
- Language: Malayalam
- Genre: Novel
- Publisher: DC Books
- Publication date: 2009
- Publication place: India
- English publication date: 2017

Enmakaje is a Malayalam language novel written by Ambikasuthan Mangad based on the life of the people in Enmakaje, a village in Kasargod affected by the endosulfan disaster in Kerala. Ambikasuthan Mangad, a professor of Malayalam at Nehru Arts and Science College, wrote the novel after directly visiting the areas affected by areal use of endosulfan. This is his debut novel. The novel is used as a textbook in seven universities. The book brought attention to the plight of the pesticide victims. The novel has been published in 25 editions in Malayalam and has been translated into English, Tamil, Kannada and Hindi.

== Background ==
The novel depicts the challenges faced by the people of Enmakaje, a village at Karnataka border in Kasargod district of Kerala, due to the lethal chemical Endosulfan used by a plantation corporation in 5,000-hectare cashew plantation in the village.

== Plot ==
A couple named Neelakantan and Devayani live on a hill inside a forest. After living in self-induced isolation for six years, they are coming to the place named Swarga which literally means heaven. There they see an unusual environment with children and calves with deformed bodies, ponds with no fish and a sky with no birds, and realize that Swarga is no heaven at all. Devayani decides to bring home a child named Pareekshit, who has never walked in his 7 years of life, who has grey hair and sores all over his body due to pesticide poisoning. Through this child, which the couple later adopts, the horror of endosulfan poisoning unfolds before readers. The couple later joins the struggle against the pesticide.

== Translations ==
J. Devika translated novel Enmakaje into English with the name Swarga. The novel is named after Swarga, the name of a place in Enmakaje village affected by the pesticide. The Tamil translation was done by Sirpi Palasupramaniyam.

The Hindi translation of the novel is published in 2018 by the Hindi Prachar Sabha on the organization's 100th anniversary. When 20 books from four South Indian languages were selected for translation, on the occasion of the 100th anniversary of the Hindi Prachar Sabha, Enmakaje was one of the 5 books included from Malayalam. With this, it has become a textbook in the M.A. course of the Hindi Prachar Sabha in four states of South India. This Hindi translation was done by renowned poet and translator Santosh Alex and the second edition is being published by Authors Press, New Delhi.
