= Farook Abdul Rahiman =

Indian filmmaker and writer (born 1966)

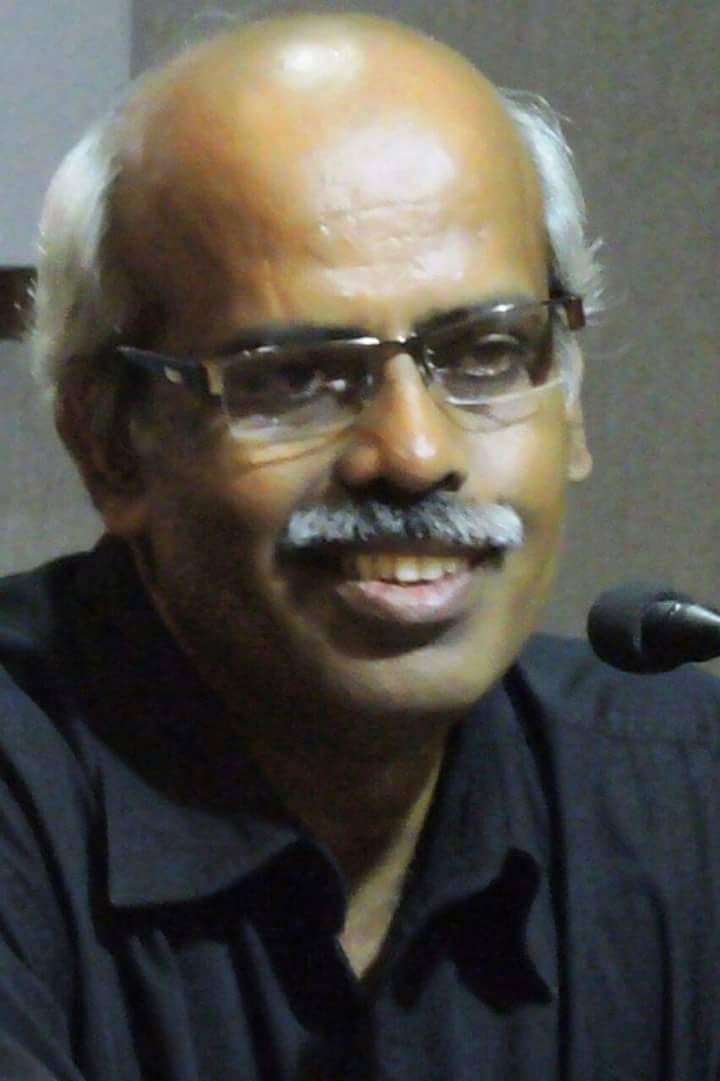
- Farook Abdul Rahiman during IFFK 2013
- Born: 5 November 1966 (age 59); Palakkad, Kerala
- Occupations: Film Director, Writer
- Awards: Kerala State Television Award 2000; Kerala State Film Award 2012

Farook Abdul Rahiman (born 5 November 1966) is an Indian filmmaker and writer. Farook was born into a Rowther family. Starting his career as an Assistant Director in television films of Dooradarshan, Farook was drawn into independent film making after his debut feature film

== Early life ==
Farook Abdul Rahiman was born in Thattamangalam, Chittur of Palakkad, to Abdul Rahiman and Ayisha He attended Seri Sahib Memorial High School at Thathamangalam, and completed his Bachelor in Commerce at Chittur Government College. He has two daughters.

== Career ==
He started his professional career in Television films at the age of 18 as Assistant Director on Dooradarshan Malayalam television film "Nangema kutty"(1984) and then assisted Malayalam Director P.N. Menon in his television film "Ethalukal"-Petals. Later produced Malayalam Television Films "Sthree Parvam" and "Kulam"-Clan. His directorial debut was the television film "Vyathiyanam"-Digression - Story of a young man with unusual thoughts and his life in Malayalam, broadcast by Dooradarshan Thiruvananathapuram. He directed Kaliyachan (The Master of the Play) based on P. Kunhiraman Nair's poem of the same name which won Kerala State Film Award for the Best Debutant director (2015). Based on his movie a book Puza pol chirichu maza pol karanju was also written by Farook Abdul Rahiman in 2021.

== Filmography ==
#	Year	Film	Category	Worked As	Awards/Remarks
1	1984	"Nangemakkutty"	Malayalam TV film	Assistant Director	
2		"Ithalukal"	Malayalam TV film	Assistant Director	
3		"Sthreeparvam"	Malayalam TV film	Producer & Associate director	
4		"Kulam"	Malayalam TV film	Producer & Associate director	
5		"Vyathiyanam"	Malayalam TV film	Director	
6	1993	"Poornaviramam"	Malayalam TV film	Director	
7	1995	"Thunchathacharian"	Malayalam TV Serial	Director	
8	1997	"Smarakasilakal"	Malayalam TV Serial	Director	
9	1997	"Snehadoodu"	Malayalam Feature Film	Assistant Director	
10	1998	"Nattakappolima"	Malayalam Docu-fiction	Director	
11	1999	"Swathanthryathinte Chirakadiyochakal"	Malayalam TV film	Director	Kerala State Television Film Award 2000
12	2001	"Sandhya Sandesham"	Malayalam TV Program	Director	
13	2001	"Naam Mahabali"	Malayalam TV Program	Creative Director	
14	2002	"Upamannyu"	Malayalam TV film	Director	
15	2003	"Pennarangu"	Malayalam TV Program	Director	
16	2004	"Karunnyathinte Punnyam"	Malayalam TV Program	Director	
17	2004	"Porattuperuma"	Malayalam TV Program	Director	
18	2012	Kaliyachan	Malayalam Feature Film	Director	1.Kerala state Film Award 2012 Best Debut Director, Best Background Score and 2nd Best Actor 2. National Award for Best background Score
19	2015	"Ishalil Kanal Thottiya Kavi"	Documentary	Director	A documentary about Mahakavi Moyinkutty Vaidiyar
20	2018	"Aardrashadananam"	Documentary	Director	A documentary about Shadananan Anikkath
21	2022	Poriveyil	Malayalam Feature Film	Director	Starring Indrans and Surabhi Lakshmi
