= Mangrove theme park, Kannur =

Theme park

The Pappinisseri mangrove theme park was a controversial eco-tourism project on the banks of Valapattanam river in Kannur.

== Photo gallery ==
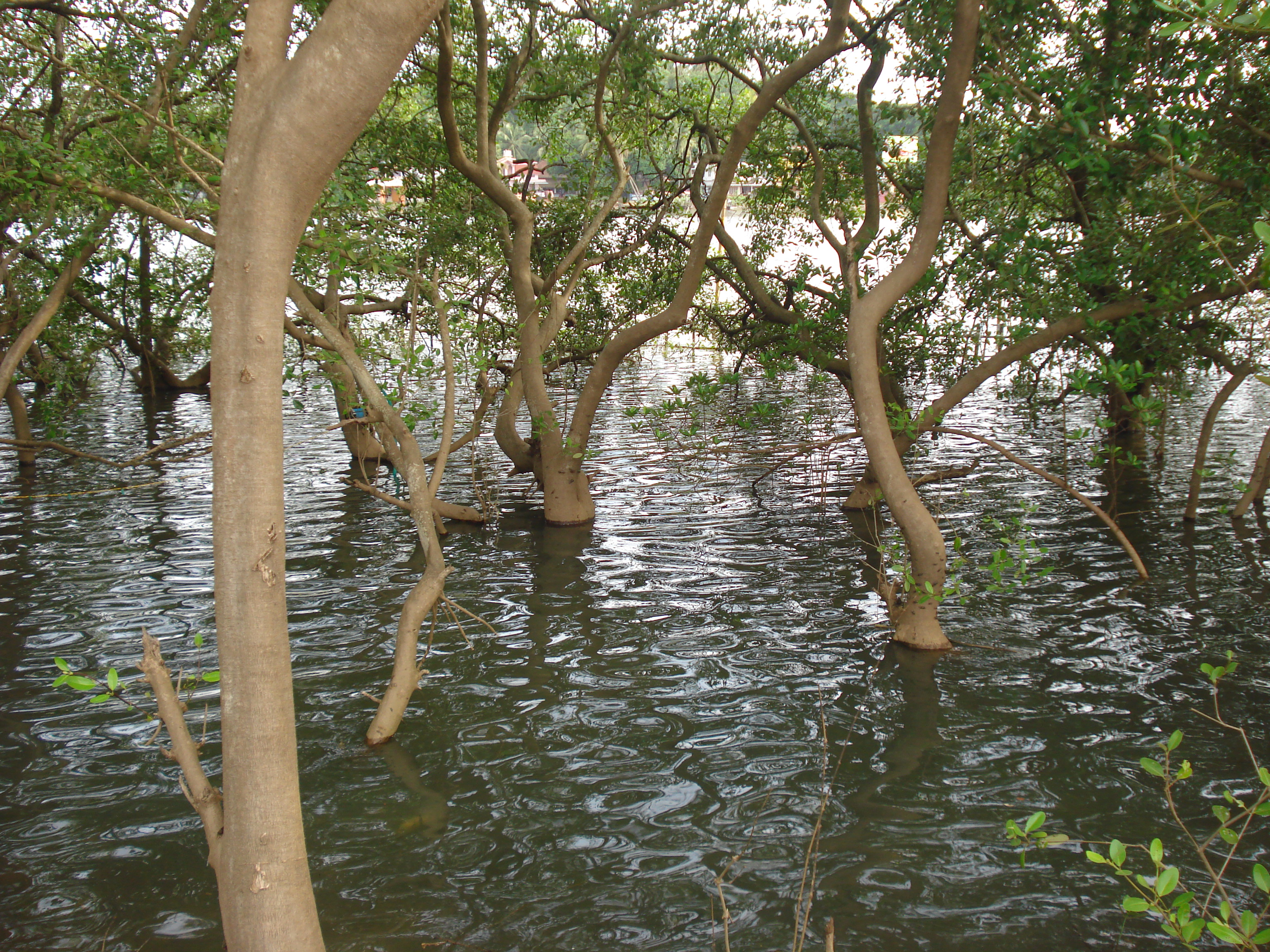

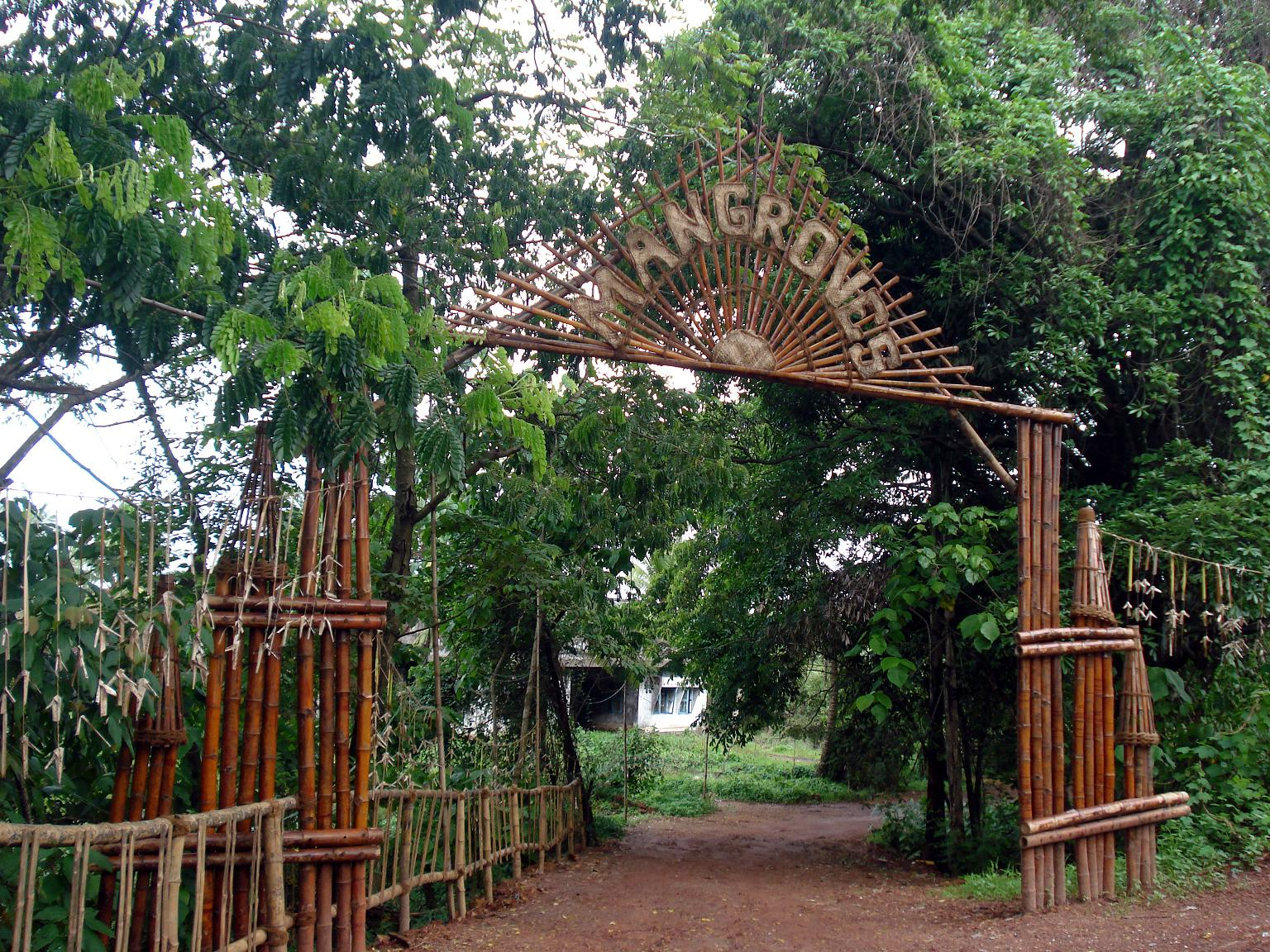

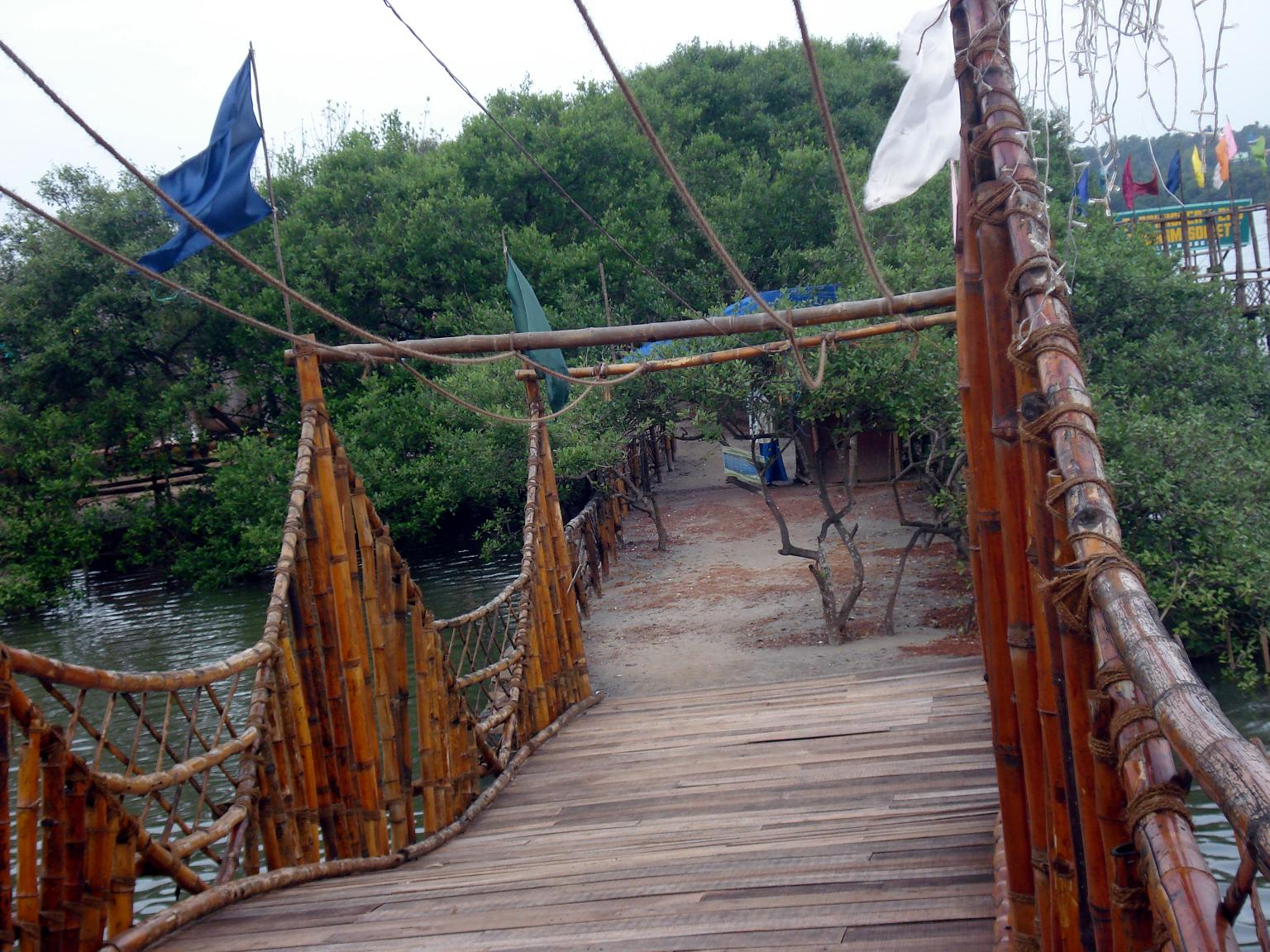

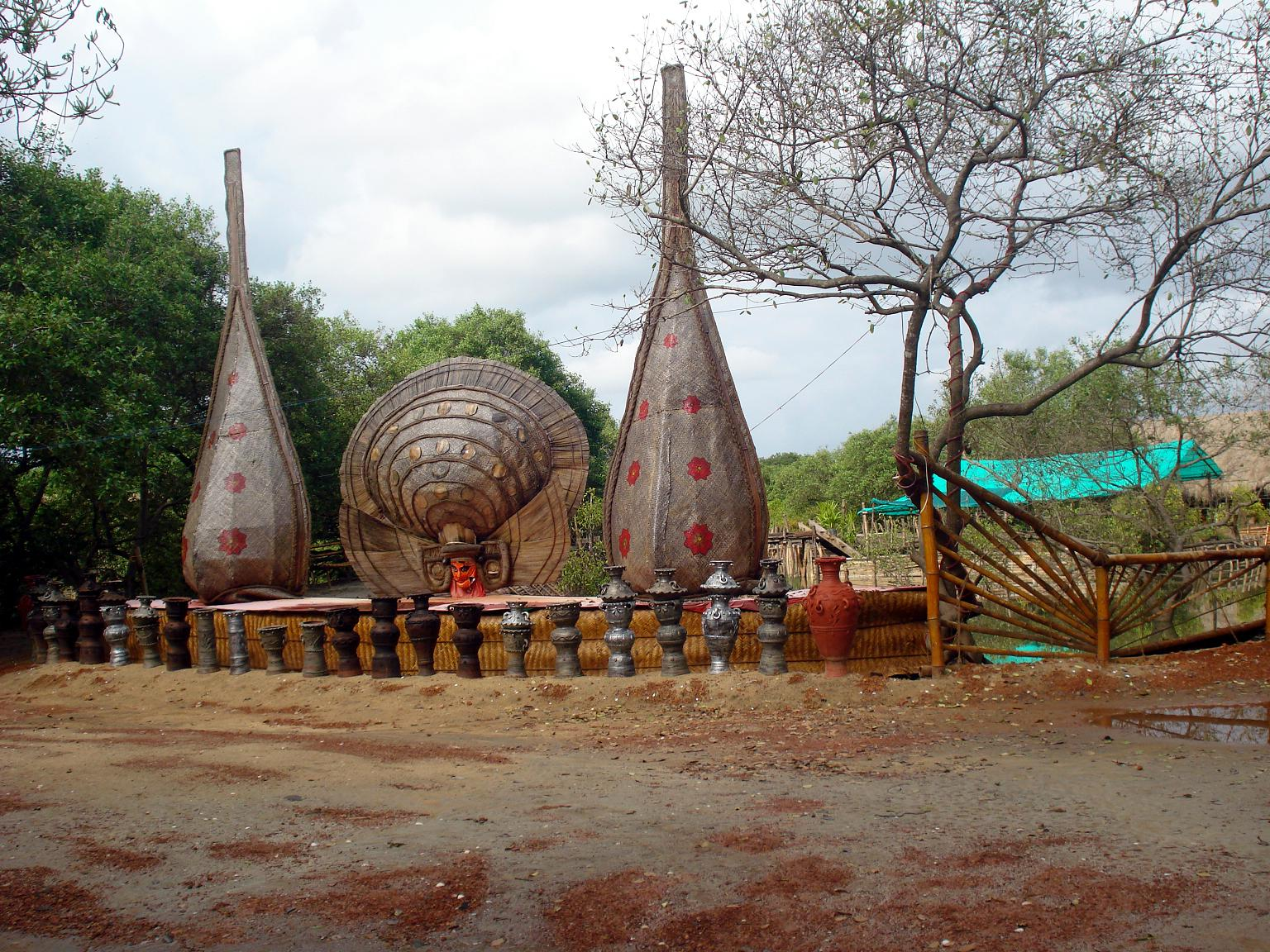

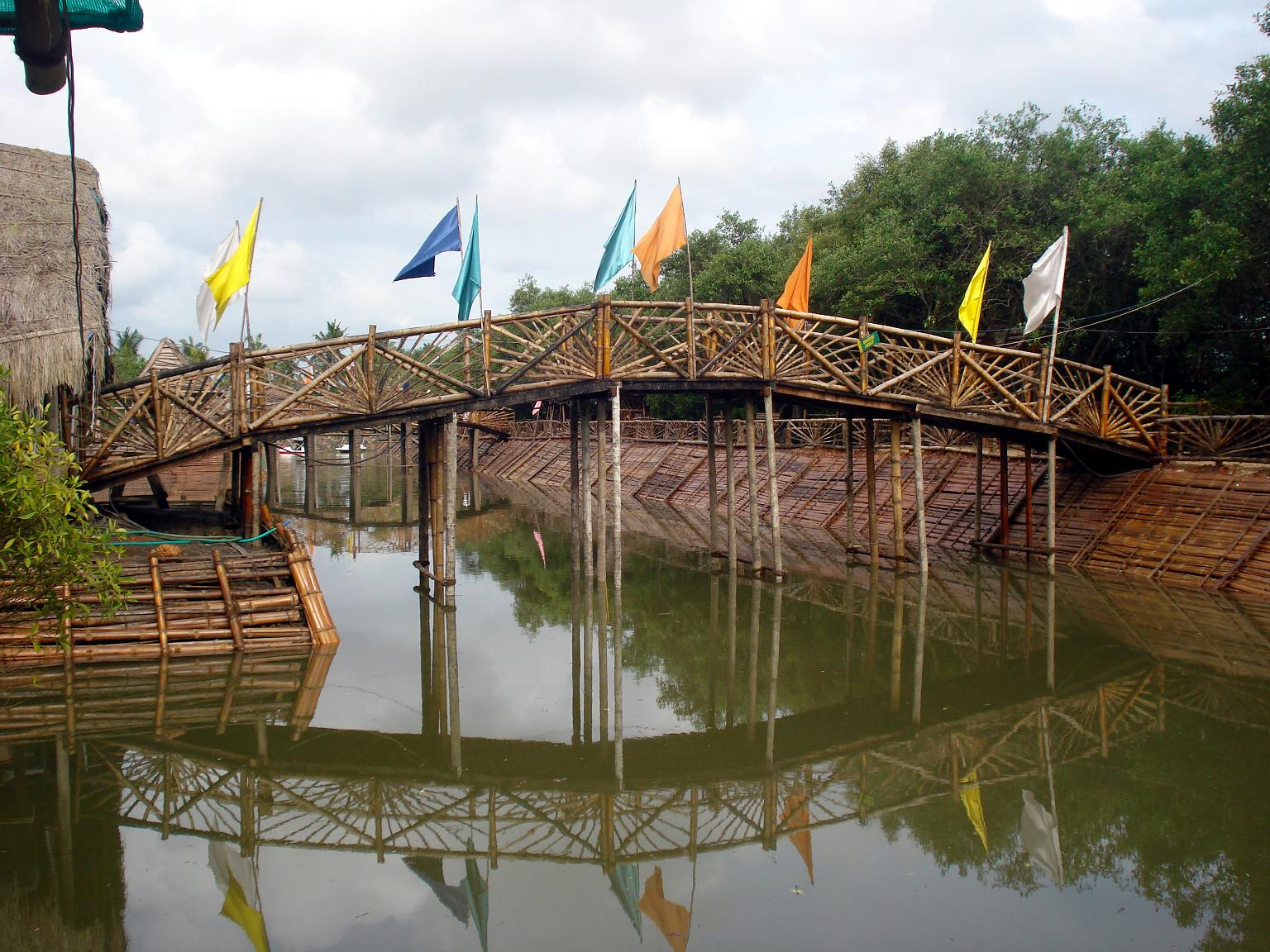

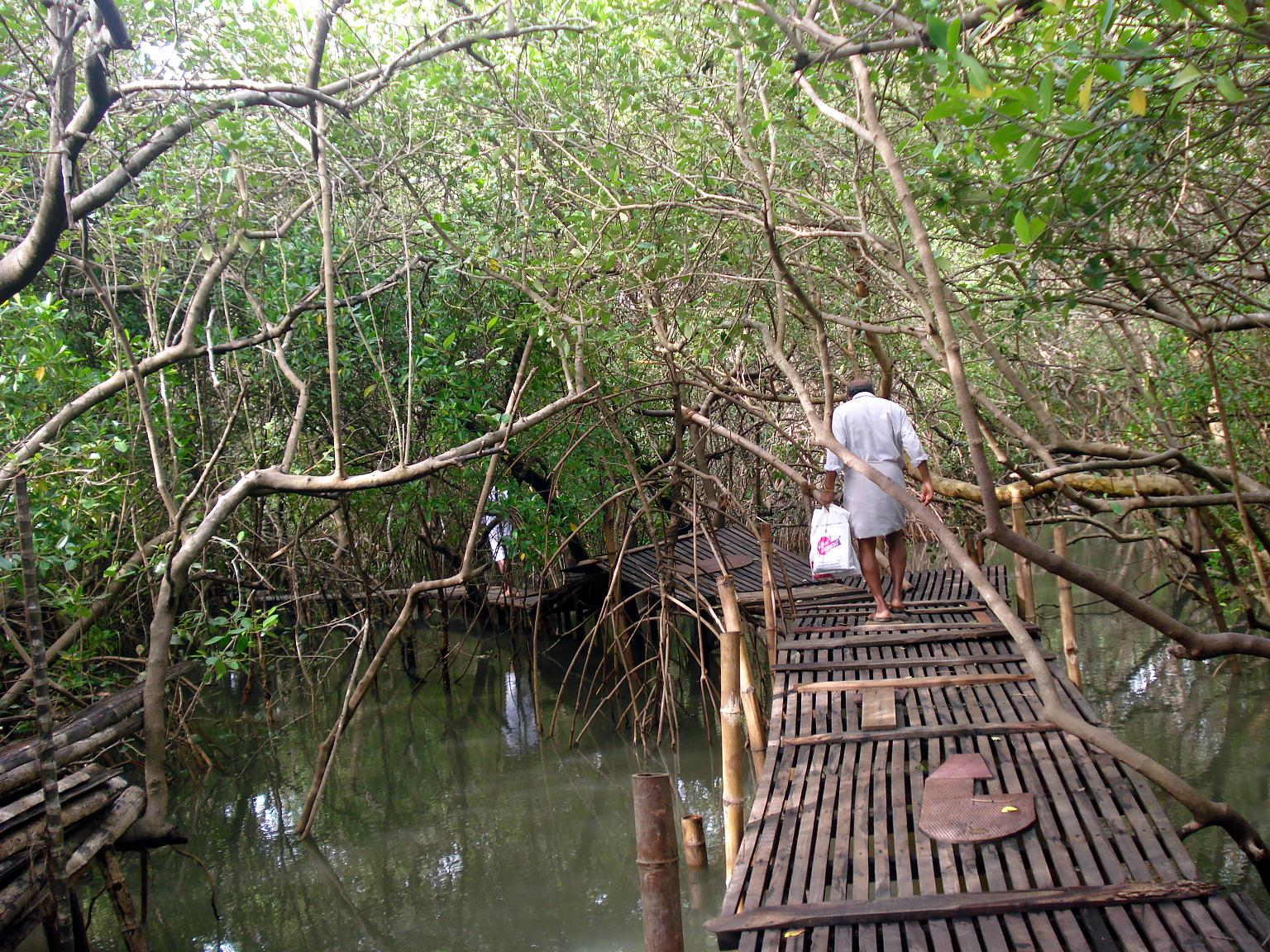

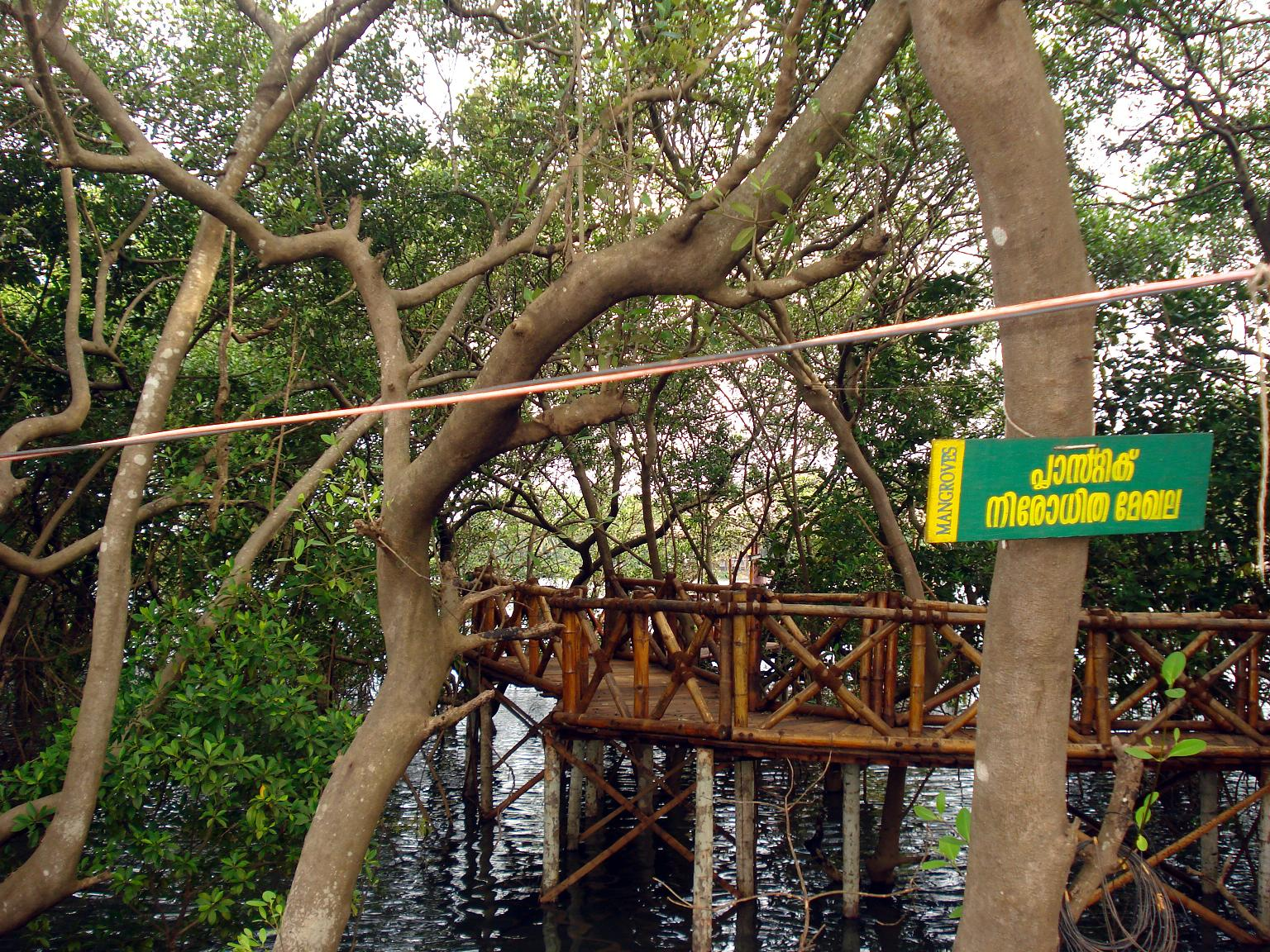

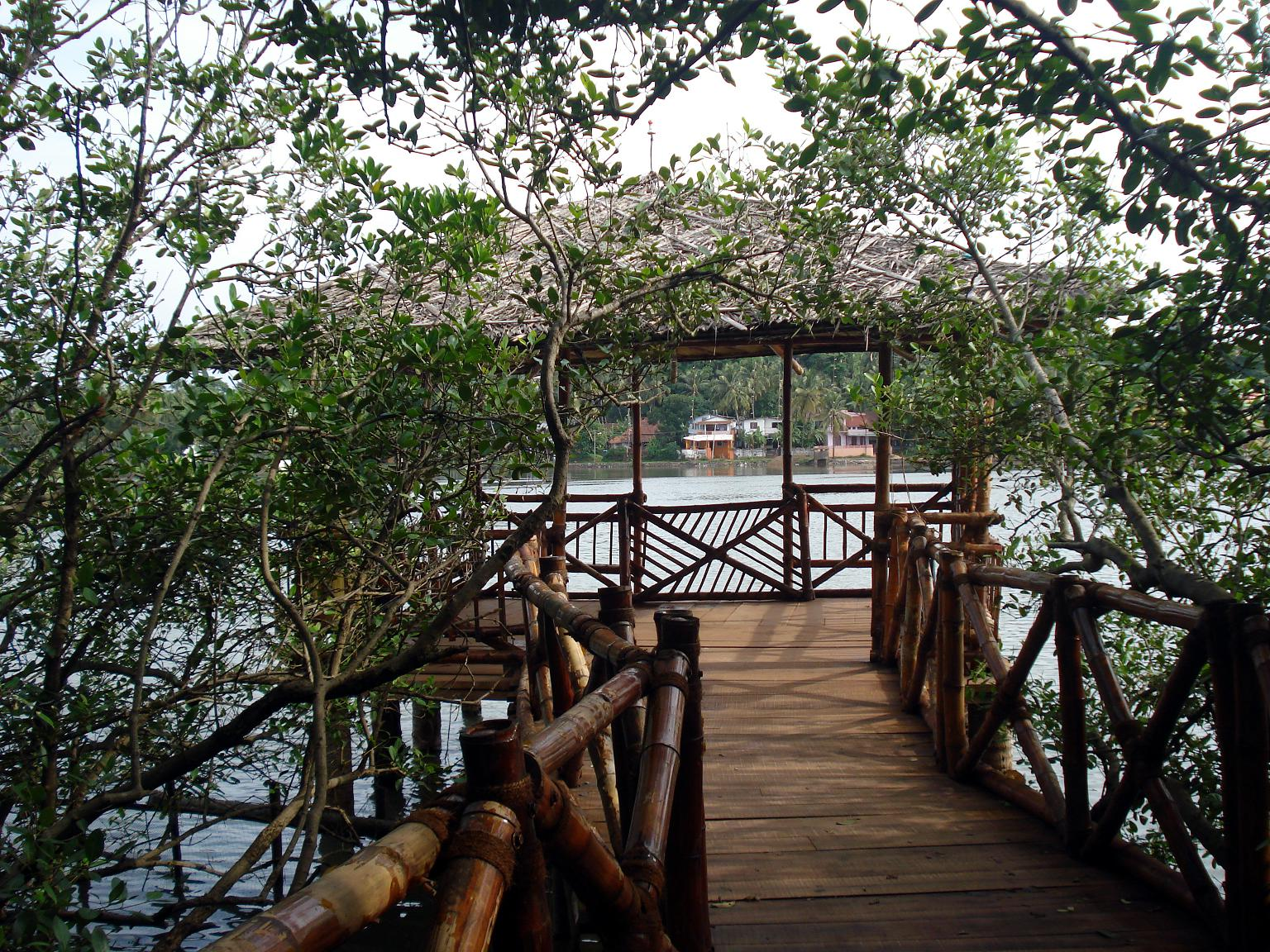

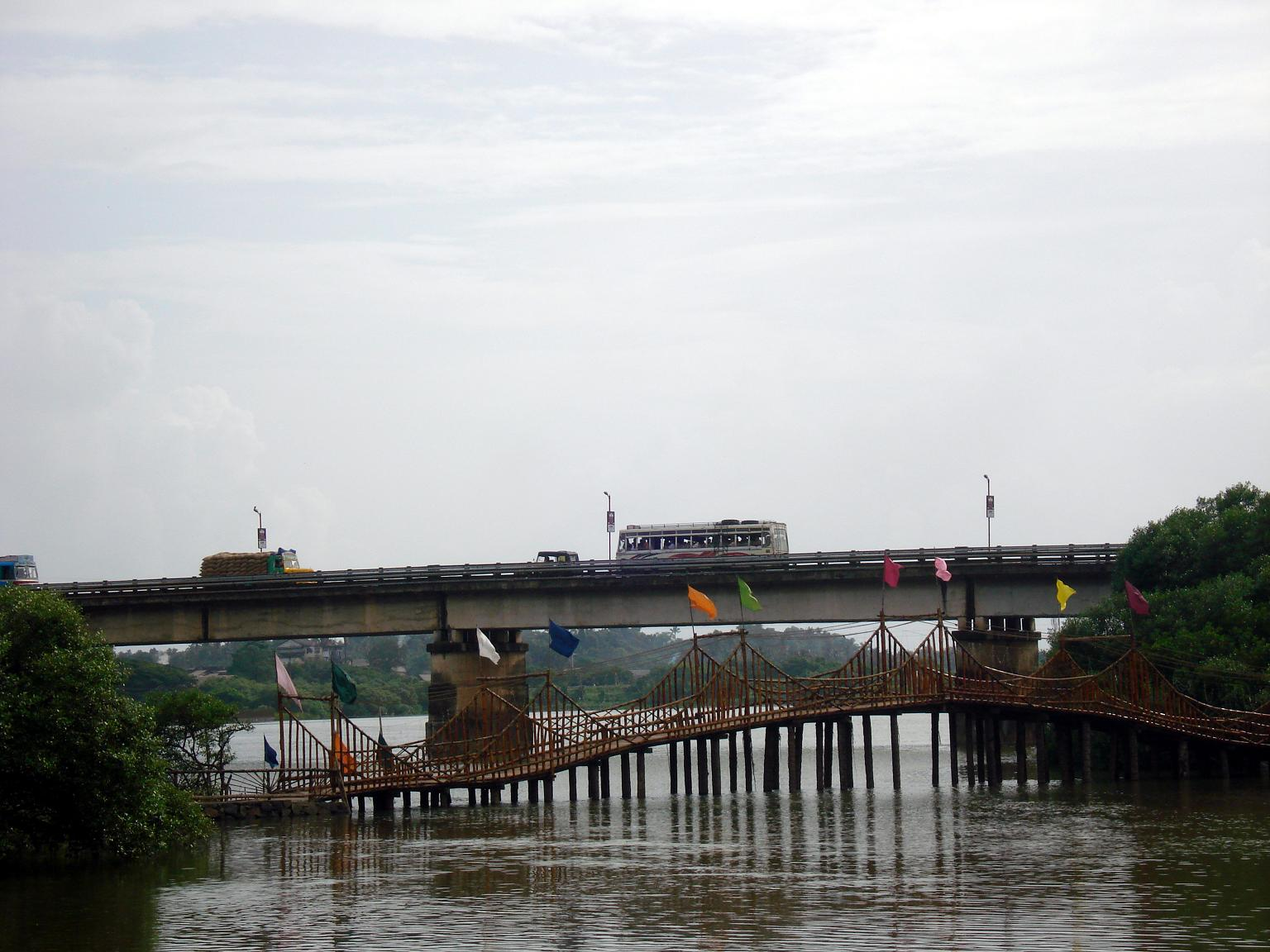

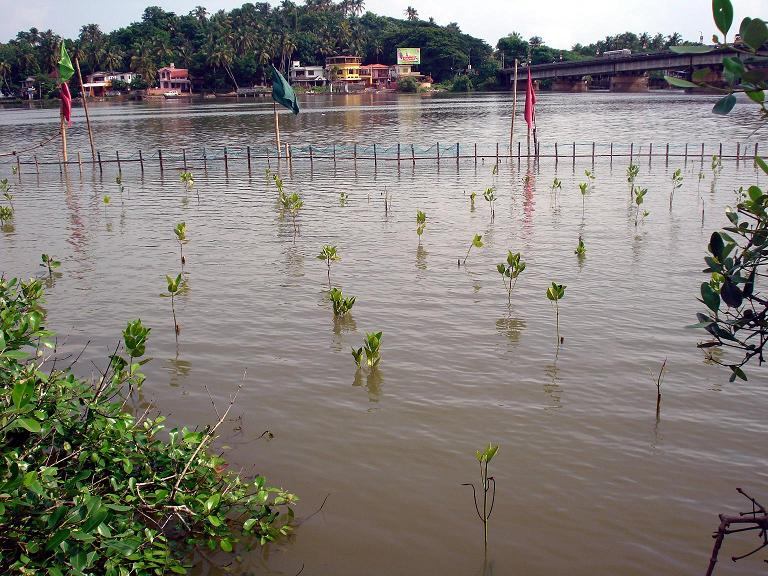

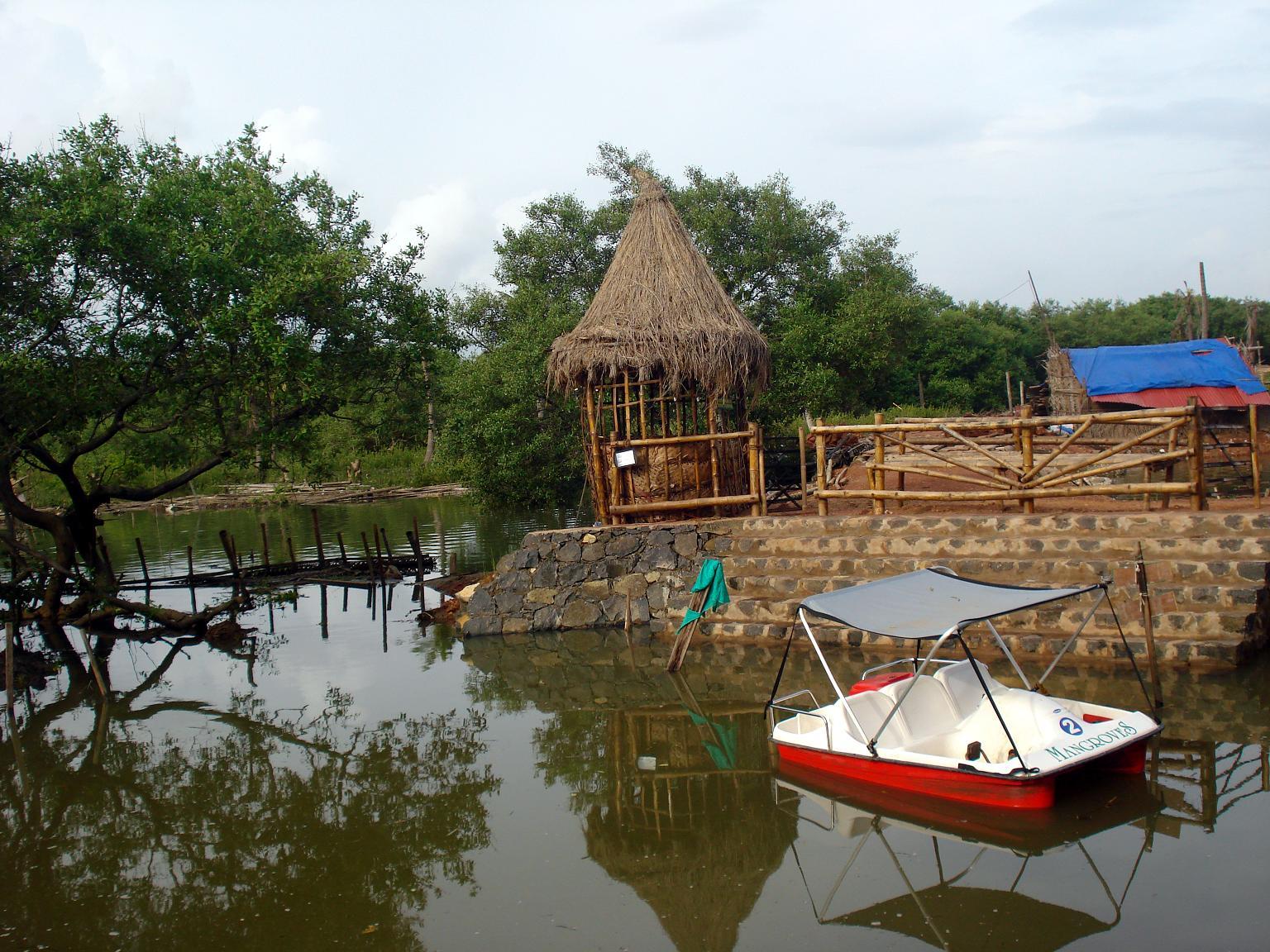

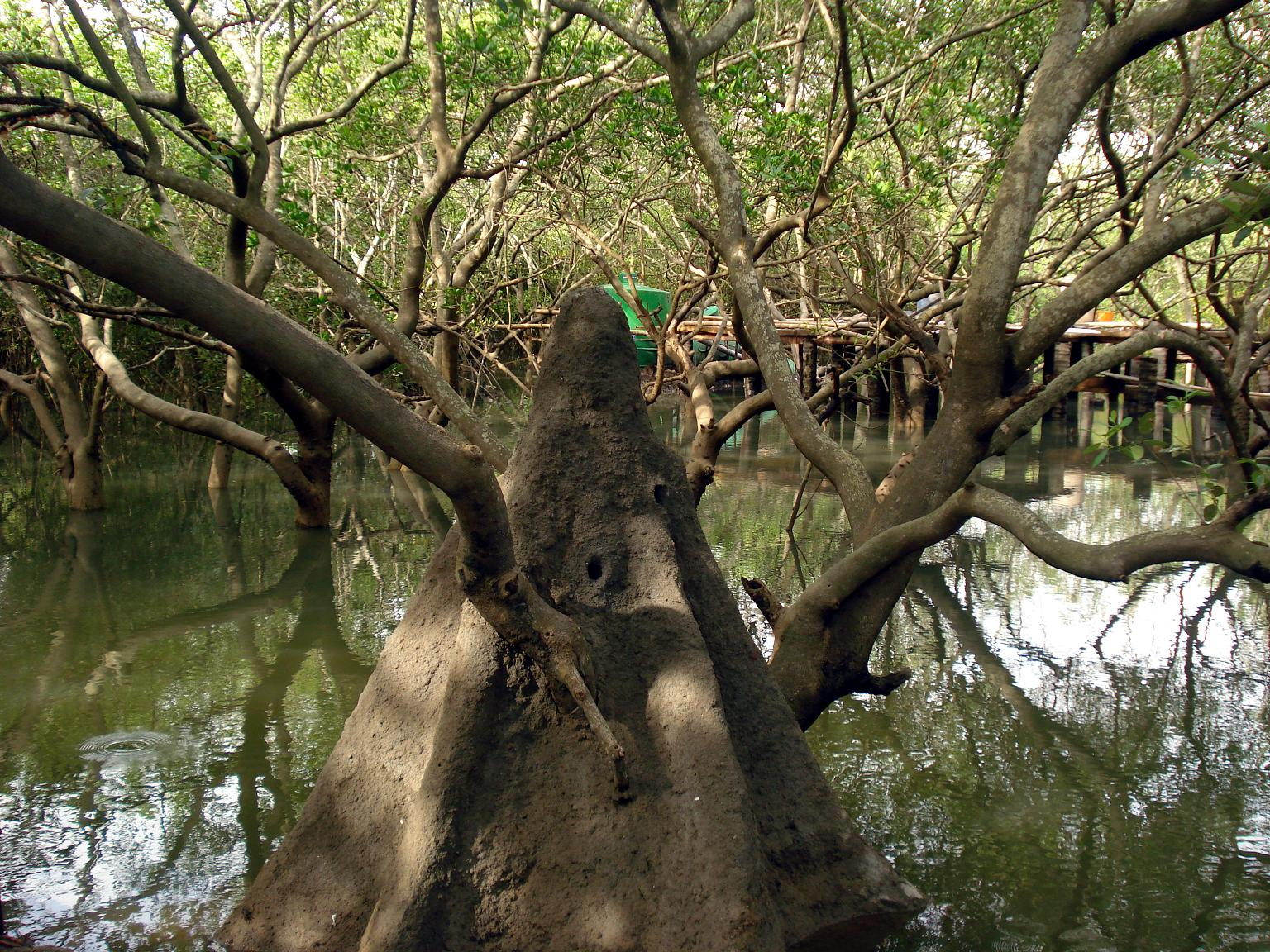

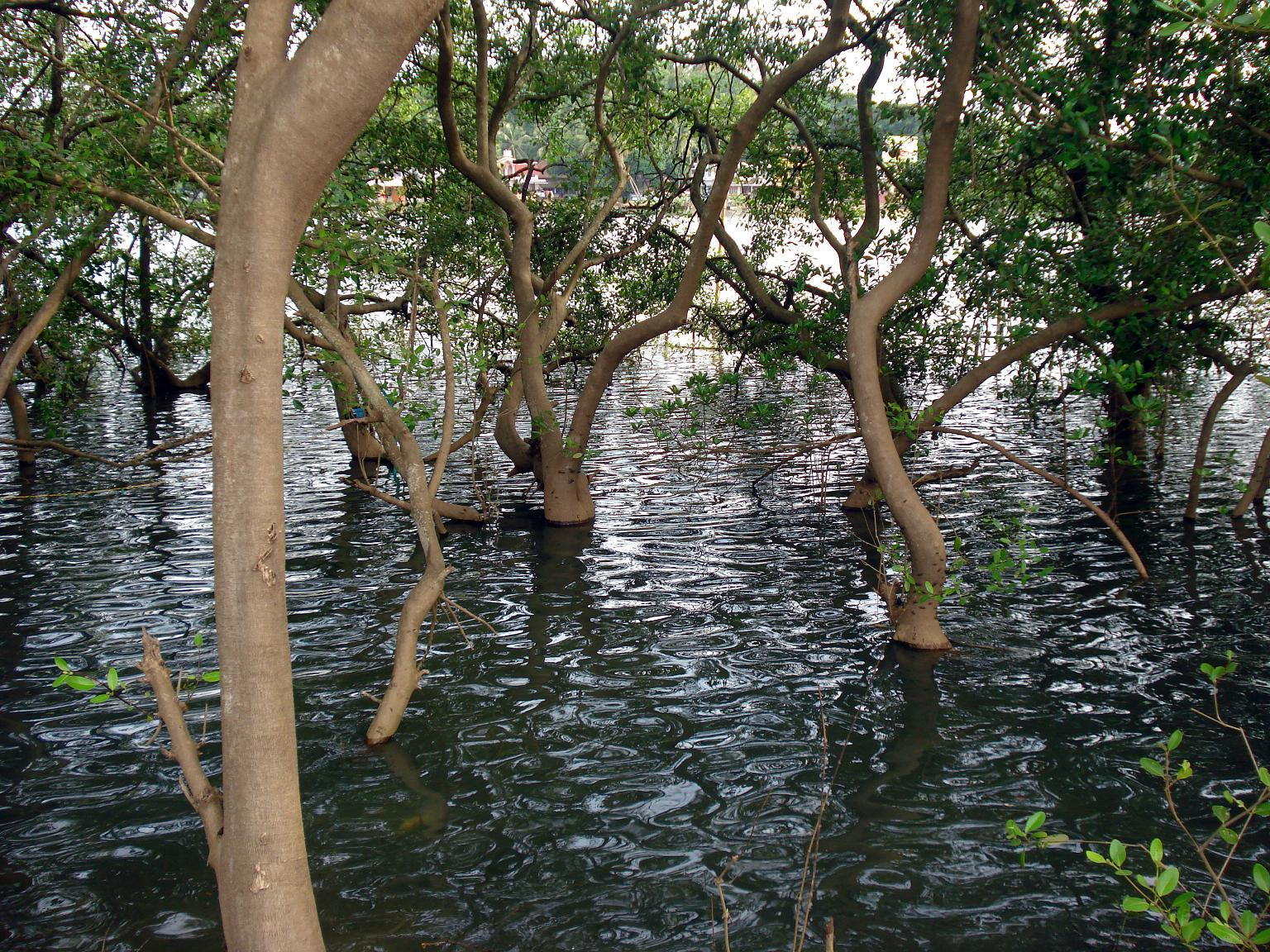

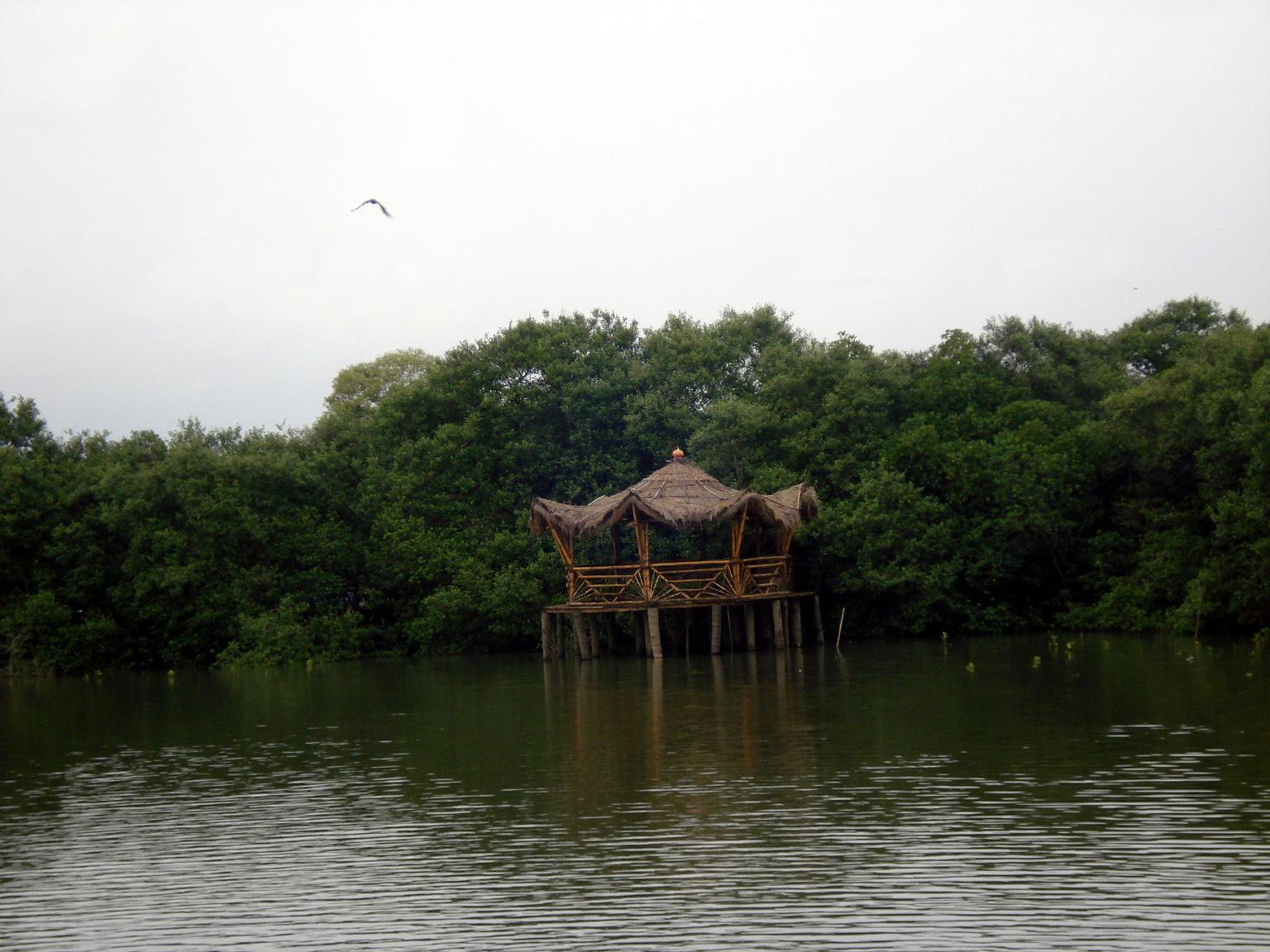

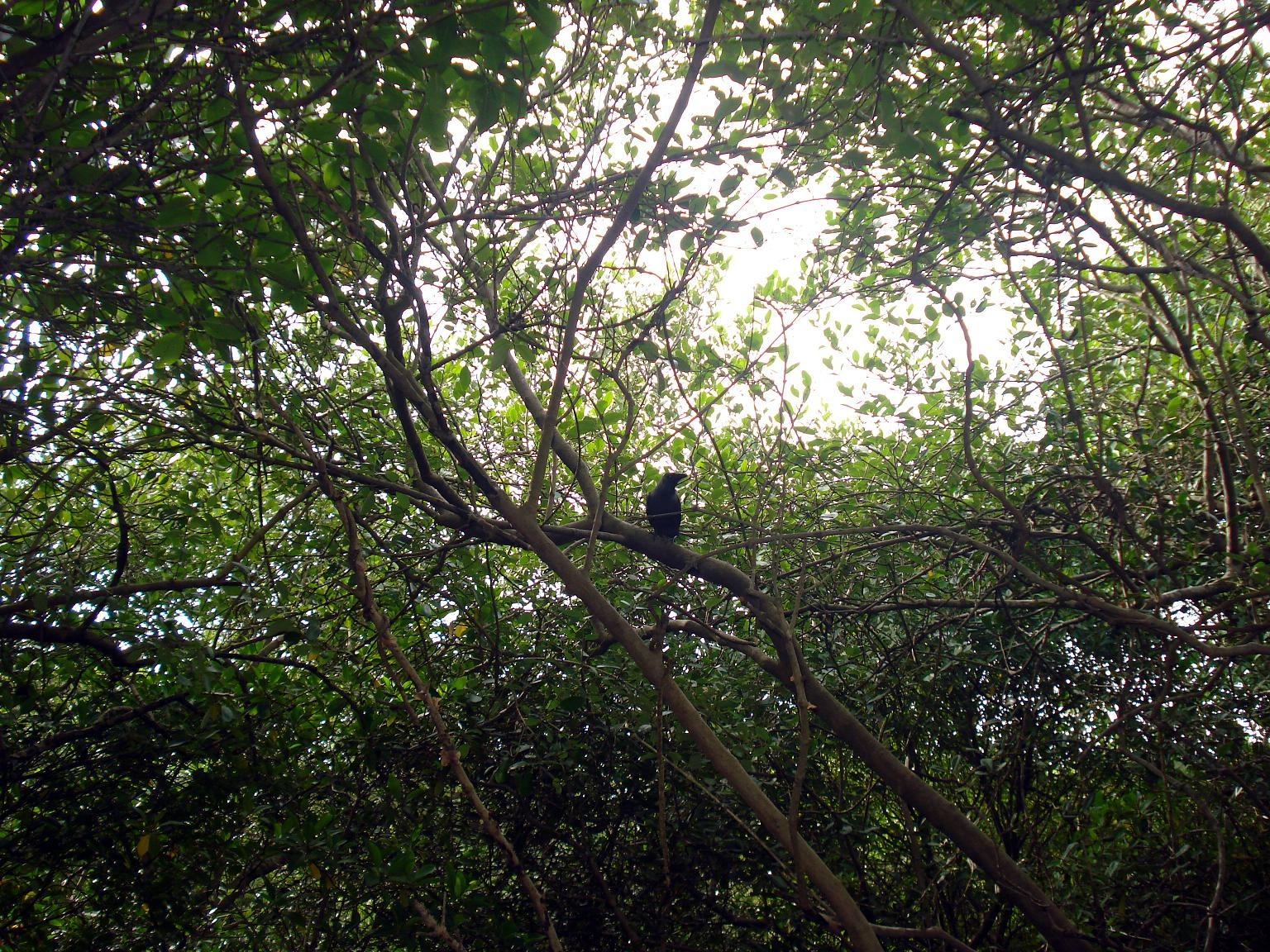

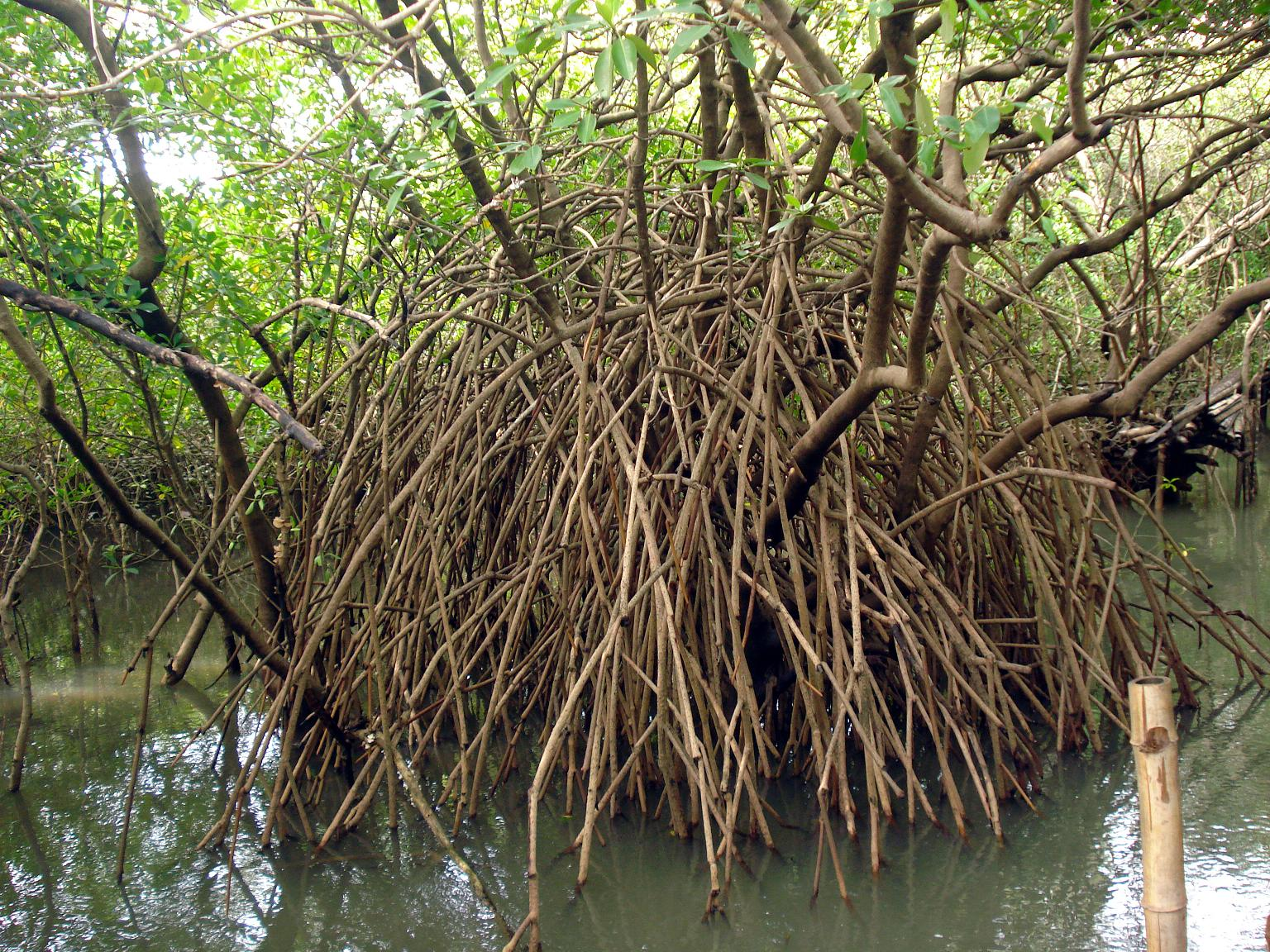

== See also ==
Kallen Pokkudan
