= Kaliyachan =

- Film poster
- Directed by: Farook Abdul Rahiman
- Screenplay by: Farook Abdul Rahiman
- Based on: Kaliyachan by P. Kunhiraman Nair
- Produced by: National Film Development Corporation
- Starring: Manoj K. Jayan; Tirtha Murbadkar; Vaiga; Kalamandalam Sivan Namboodiri; Babu Namboothiri
- Cinematography: M. J. Radhakrishnan
- Edited by: Bijith Bala
- Music by: Bijibal
- Distributed by: East Coast Reel & Real Entertainments
- Release date: 25 September 2015
- Running time: 100 minutes
- Country: India
- Language: Malayalam

Kaliyachan (English: The Master of the Play) is a 2015 Malayalam drama film directed by Farook Abdul Rahiman in his directorial debut. It starred Manoj K. Jayan, Tirtha Murbadkar, Vaiga, Kalamandalam Sivan Namboodiri, Babu Namboothiri, Manju Pillai, and Mani Pattambi in lead roles. The story about a Kathakali actor and his guru is based on celebrated 1959 poem Kaliyachan by P. Kunhiraman Nair.

At the 60th National Film Awards, it won the award for Best Music Direction (Background score) for Bijibal. At the 2012 Kerala State Film Awards, Kaliyachan received three awards — Best Debut Director, Best Background Score and Second Best Actor for Manoj K. Jayan.

== Plot ==
The film is about the Kathakali actor, Kunhiraman, and his relationship with his guru, Asan. Over the years, as the actor gets popular, he becomes arrogant and takes to confronting his guru.

== Cast ==
- Manoj K. Jayan as Kunhiraman, Kathakali actor
- Tirtha Murbadkar as Devu
- Vaigha Rose as Radha
- Kalamandalam Sivan Namboodiri as Asan, Kathakali guru
- Babu Namboothiri
- Manju Pillai
- Manikandan Pattambi

== Production ==
Having grown up in the Palakkad in Kerala, where the poet P. Kunhiraman Nair lived, director AbdulRahiman was familiar with the subject. He has been working as film director with state-run Doordarshan TV channel since 1984, where he has made award-winning tele-films like Thunchath Acharyan (1995) and Swathanthryathinte Chirakadiyochakal (2000). Initially, the director had planned an autobiographical film on the poet, titled Kaviyude Kalpadulal (Footprints of a Poet); later he shifted to adapting the poem Kaliyachan, which has autobiographical elements in it. The script was written 12 years ago with actor Manoj K. Jayan in mind as the protagonist. Howvever, for several years, the director was unable to find a producer. Finally the government-owned National Film Development Corporation of India (NFDC) agreed to produce the film.

== Music ==
The music was given by Bijibal with lyrics by Rafeeq Ahmed and Ramanuni.

== Crew ==
- Art Direction: Girish Menon
- Sound design: Ganesh Marar
- Costume Design: Sakhi Thomas
- Make-up: Saji Koratty
