= Papilio Buddha (film) =

- Official poster
- Directed by: Jayan K. Cherian
- Written by: Jayan K. Cherian
- Produced by: Prakash Bare; Thampy Antony
- Starring: S. P. Sreekumar; Saritha Kukku; David Briggs; Kallen Pokkudan; Padmapriya; Prakash Bare; Thampy Antony
- Cinematography: M J Radhakrishnan
- Edited by: Sujoy Joseph
- Production companies: Silicon Media; Kayal Films
- Release date: 15 March 2013
- Running time: 108 minutes
- Country: India
- Languages: Malayalam; English

Papilio Buddha (Trans: Malabar Banded Peacock, Malayalam, 2013) is an Indian film written and directed by Jayan K. Cherian. The film focuses on the atrocities committed against Dalits, women, and the environment. It features S. P. Sreekumar, David Briggs, and Saritha Kukku while Padmapriya, Prakash Bare, and Thampy Antony play supporting roles. Kerala-based environmentalist Kallen Pokkudan appears in another important role in the film, which also casts 150 Adivasis. The film was completely shot in Wayanad, Kerala and the cinematography was done by M J Radhakrishnan. The story deals with discrimination against landless Dalits and the politics of suppression of their struggle against the upper castes and other powerful elements locally.

== Plot ==
The film unfolds in a fictional space, in a Dalit settlement called Meppara. It explores the life of a group of displaced Dalits in the Western Ghats of India and probes the new identity politics based on Ambedkarism, gaining momentum among the Dalits in the region, in the milieu of an ongoing land struggle. A band of displaced untouchables in the Western Ghats of India embraces Buddhism to escape oppression. The on-screen happenings are from the perspective of a young Sankaran, a Jawaharlal Nehru University (JNU) dropout, whose insecurity and reticence are in stark contrast to the deep-rooted faith and conviction of his father, Kandal Kariyan.

Shankaran, a young Dalit man, befriends a white gay American lepidopterist Jack, for whom he helps catch butterflies, including the rare and beautiful Papilio Buddha, and it turns out the two men are romantically involved. While to the displeasure of Shankaran's elderly father, homosexuality is of little conin among this Dalit community.

Shankaran's father is a communist who feels let down by the failure to achieve equal rights. Meanwhile, Manju, a strong-minded woman who has a job as a rickshaw driver, struggles to avoid prejudice in a male-dominated career.

When Manjusree hits a lecherous union leader, and Shankaran is arrested for illegally catching butterflies, the events spark off two acts of violence that politicise and radicalise the community, some of whom are queer, who decide to shun the peaceful tactics proscribed by Mahatma Gandhi in favour of rebellion.

The film brings into focus, an example of the epic land struggles, which were fought in various regions of the state and across India, and the oppression of indigenous people by the powerful political and social establishments. It also maps environmental degradation and abuse of pristine mountain habitats by outside forces.

== Cast ==
- S. P. Sreekumar as Shankaran
- David Briggs as Jack
- Saritha Kukku as Manju
- Kallen Pokkudan as Kandal Kariyan
- Thampi Antony as Ramdasji
- Padmapriya as Collector
- Prakash Bare as SP
- Surabhi Lakshmi

== Production ==
The film marks the debut of Jayan K. Cherian as a feature filmmaker. A student of Iranian filmmaker Abbas Kiarostami, he had previously done several experimental films and short fictions including Shape of the Shapeless, Love in the Time of Foreclosure, Hidden Things, Soul of Solomon and Capturing the Signs of God.

Papilio Buddha is inspired by several events that happened in various Dalit communities in Kerala, including their struggle for land in places such as Chengara, Meppadi, and Muthanga, and its effect on the Dalit population. The director travelled all over Kerala and tried to integrate real life experiences of Dalits, after talking to them. The film was shot from Muthanga in Wayanad district, Kerala. Principal photography for the film was completed in 19 days.

== Release ==
=== Censorship ===
The film was denied censor certification by the Central Board of Film Certification (CBFC). The CBFC stated that the screening rights were denied as the film had visuals and dialogues denigrating iconic leaders including Mahatma Gandhi (In a scene from the film, a group of irate Dalits burn an effigy of Mahatma Gandhi as they oppose attempts by a mainstream political party to take up their cause by going on a fast.), E. M. S. Namboodiripad and Ayyankali apart from visuals of extreme violence and extreme torture of women by police. Jayan K. Cherian says that the ban on the public screening of the film is essentially fascistic in nature. Cherian says, "The Board has listed a number of reasons for denying the certification based on its archaic set of guidelines designed to give overwhelming dominance for the state. Most of the objections are about denigrating Gandhi, Ayyankali, Buddha et al. The perceived denigration seems to be coming from the realistic treatment of the climax scene - dalits' agitation and their confrontation with the police who use force to evict them."

The Censor Board had also taken exception to the language used in the film. Usage of extremely filthy language and expletives by numerous characters throughout the film, calling caste names such as 'Pulaya', 'Pulakalli', etc. in a derogatory manner, dialogues denigrating communal sections of the society etc. is what the board noted. "The typical and realistic Malayalam used by the filmmaker for the characters in this film may be different from the usual commercial film language but calling it filthy is very subjective. The atrocities the Dalit activists Sankaran and Manju go through in this film are reflections of social injustices happening in our society without exaggeration," explained Jayan.

In January 2013, the board decided to give certification to the film after the makers agreed to mute a controversial speech by Ambedkar in the movie. In the speech, Ambedkar implies that Gandhi was cheating Dalits by denying them an electoral constituency of their own during the Yervada jail fast in 1932. Prakash Bare says, "The Censor Board had cited nearly 30 instances. Finally, we agreed to mute the offending speech and also blurring in certain scenes. We agreed as it won't change the structure of the film."

=== IFFK screening ===
The film was denied a screening at the 17th International Film Festival of Kerala (IFFK) which created much controversy. The film was not included in the nine Malayalam films selected for screening in the festival in two different categories. Jayan K. Cherian kicked off the controversy by stating that he was shocked by the decision of the jury headed by director Sibi Malayil. "Private screening, especially at the film festivals, needed no censor certificates. The jury had almost taken a decision in the film's favour, but it was averted at the last moment for political reasons," he said.

=== Private screening ===
A preview of the film was held in Thiruvananthapuram in September 2012. The screening brought a number of Dalit Human Rights Movement (DHRM) activists to the theatre hall. "The film has not shown even one-hundredth of the torture borne by us. And now they won't even allow our film to be screened," says Thathu, a Dalit who saw the film. About the denigrating remarks about Mahatma Gandhi, the director said, "Gandhi has a saintly image created through our educational system and the media. When we brought out a counter-narrative to the official one, there is no space for us. Then how can it be a democracy?"

=== International premiere ===
Initially banned in India and subsequently certified for theatrical distribution, Papilio Buddha had a world premiere on 19 March 2013 at the 27th London Lesbian & Gay Film Festival organised by the British Film Institute. It was the only Indian film to be selected for the festival. The film was an inaugural film in three festivals — International Film Festival Thrissur, Chittur Panchajanayam International Film Festival and Jamia Milia Malayalam Film Festival. The film has been screened at Montreal World Film Festival, Trinidad and Tobago Film Festival and Athens International Film and Video Film Festival in 2013. The film was the only Indian film selected to be screened in the Panorama Section at the 64th Berlin International Film Festival.

=== Theatrical release ===
The film reached theatres on 15 March 2013.

== Reception ==
Malayalam writer Deedi Damodaran included Papilio Buddha among the five films that she feels were fair in portraying the gender issue in a feature published by The Hindu. She said, "Our society is not yet ready to face the statements this film makes. The film deals with gender and Dalit issues in a raw manner, and I feel these are causes that are inseparable. Papilio Buddha chooses not to beat about the bush. It is bold and clear and relevant. No wonder the state was worried by the revelations made so loudly and unapologetically."

Although the makers of the film vehemently opposes any negative remarks about Gandhi, a writeup on the film by Alex Davidson for the British Film Institute notes:

To western eyes, this community may be unfamiliar, and the scorn shown towards Gandhi's teachings (principally his advocacy of hunger strikes) may shock those whose image of the leader is influenced by Ben Kingsley’s Oscar-winning performance in Richard Attenborough’s 1982 biopic.

=== Accolades ===
The film won Jayan K. Cherian a Special Jury Award for direction at the 2012 Kerala State Film Awards while Saritha Kukku received a Special Jury Mention for her performance in the film. It won the second prize for Best Narrative Feature Film at the Athens International Film and Video Festival. At the 2013 Oaxaca FilmFest of Mexico, Papilio Buddha won two major awards. M. J.Radhakrishnan was conferred with the Best Cinematographer award and Manu Perunna won the Best Art Director award.
