= Bharatha Puzha (film) =

Released film

- Directed by: Manilal
- Written by: Manilal
- Produced by: Shaji Kundayil; Nias Kodungallur; Praijith Prathapan; Sajith Haridas & Sachin
- Starring: Siji Pradeep; Irshad; Sreejith Ravi; Manikandan Pattambi; M. G. Sasi; Sunil Sukhada
- Cinematography: Jomon Thomas
- Edited by: Vinu Joy
- Music by: Sunilkumar P K
- Production company: Chitranjali
- Release date: 2024
- Country: India
- Language: Malayalam

Bharatha Puzha is a 2024 Indian Malayalam-language drama film written and directed by Manilal (in his directorial debut). It tells the story of Sugandhi, a sex worker who attempts to navigate through the social mores of life around her. Her journeys transgress gender and class divisions, and explore relationships.

== Plot ==
Sugandhi is the central character in the film. She is a sex worker and the story progresses through various incidents in her life. It is also a journey through Thrissur town, and through several people from different walks of life. Her journeys map and meander through the geography and humanscape of Trichur, a town presided over by the God of Destruction but pulsating with desires and dreams of the multitude. The film is also about the various ways and means through which people weave their own lives – sometimes as a carnival of possibilities, but most often as a hell of rules and inhibitions, self-inflicted, imagined or imposed by society. Through Sugandhi, the film explores the joys and freedoms of earth that must, should or could be for all.

== Cast ==
- Siji Pradeep As Sugandhi
- Irshad (actor) As Gulfukaran
- Sreejith Ravi As Doctor friend
- Manikandan Pattambi as Priest
- M. G. Sasi As Writer Friend
- Sunil Sukhada Friend
- Dinesh Engoor
- Achudanandan

== Awards ==
51st Kerala State Film Awards

- Kerala State Film Award – Special Mention for Siji Pradeep for acting.
- Kerala State Film Award – Special Mention for Nalini Jameela for costume design.
