= Kallur, Thrissur =

Village in Thrissur District, Kerala, India

Kallur is a small village in Thrissur district of Kerala, southwest India, which is almost 13 km from Thrissur City.
