= Jayan K. Cherian =

American film director

- Born: Jayan K. Cherian; Muvattupuzha, Kerala, India
- Occupations: Director, Producer, Screenwriter, Cinematographer, Actor
- Website: http://jayankc.com/

Jayan K. Cherian is an Indian poet filmmaker who lives in New York City, US. He used to write in Malayalam (under the name Jayan KC) and English languages. His documentary film Shape of the Shapeless got wide popularity on Many film festivals like International festival circuit, The International Film Festival of South Africa, as well as several festivals in North America. It won the Silver Jury Prize at the San Francisco Short Film Festival 2010, the Eastman Kodak award for Best Cinematography, and City Visions 2010 award for Best Documentary. Graduated with honors from Hunter College, BA in Film and Creative Writing and MFA from The City College of New York in Writing Directing Film, and Cinematography. Ka Bodyscapes (2016) is his new feature film, Papilio Buddha (2013), his critically acclaimed debut feature film, was screened in the Panorama Section at the 64th Berlin International Film Festival. He made several experimental documentaries and narrative shorts such as: Shape of the Shapeless (2010) Love in the Time of Foreclosure (2009), Hidden Things (2009), Soul of Solomon (2008), Capturing the Signs of God (2008), Holy Mass (2007), Tree of Life (2007), Simulacra the Reality of the Unreal (2007), The Inner Silence of the Tumult (2007), Hid-entity (2007), and Tandava the Dance of Dissolution(2006).

== Filmography ==
| Year | Film | Director | Producer | Writer | Editor | Cinematographer |
|---|---|---|---|---|---|---|
| 2007 | Tree of Life | Yes | Yes | Yes | Yes | Yes |
| 2008 | Soul of Solomon | Yes | Yes | Yes | Yes | Yes |
| 2008 | Inner Silence of the Tumult | Yes | Yes | Yes | Yes | Yes |
| 2010 | Shape of the Shapeless | Yes | Yes | Yes | No | Yes |
| 2011 | Miss Rose Wood (Documentary) | Yes | Yes | Yes | Yes | Yes |
| 2013 | Papilio Buddha (Feature film) | Yes | No | Yes | No | No |
| 2016 | Ka Bodyscapes | Yes | Yes | Yes | No | No |
| 2014 | Rhythm of Dammam | Yes | Yes | Yes | No | No |

== Poems ==
Malayalam

- Ayodhanaththinte Achuthantu (Axis of Combat)(1996)
- Ayanam vachana rekhayil(Journey on the line of verse)(1999)
- Polymorphism (2002)
- Pachakku (Like it is ) (2006)

English

- A Guerrilla Love-fight (Flight) Tactic for Cyber Coolies
- A Sonnet and Some Hanging Loose Scribbles Towards the Hub
- AXIS OF COMBAT
- Dying Declaration
- Battle
- The Broken Buddha
- When the New World Order Blooms
- *The Canonized*
- THE ALBUM OF THE NUPTIAL ROOM
- Motion on Word's Orbit

== Awards ==
=== Film ===
Cherian's films have won the following awards:

- Berlin International Film Festival, Teddy Award (Nominated), 2014, Papilio Buddha (2013)
- Berlin International Film Festival, Cinema Fairbindet prize (Nominated), 2014 Papilio Buddha (2013)
- Berlin International Film Festival, Amnesty International Prize (Nominated), 2014 Papilio Buddha (2013)
- Athens International Film and Video Festival 2013, Ohio, USA, Narrative Film Award for Papilio Buddha (2013)
- Kerala State Film Awards, Special Jury Award for Best Direction, Papilio Buddha (2013)
- Kerala Film Critics Association Awards 2013 for Best Debut Director, Papilio Buddha (2013)
- Bombay International Documentary, Short and Animation Film Festival(MIFF)2012, Won Silver Conch, Best International Documentary Film/Video up to 60 Minutes, Shape of the Shapeless (2010)
- Black Maria Film and Video Festival 2012, Won Director's Choice Award for Documentary, Shape of the Shapeless (2010)
- Athens International Film and Video Festival 2011, Ohio, USA, Honorable Mention for Short Documentary, Shape of the Shapeless (2010)
- Kerala Film Critics Association Award for Best Debut Director, Papilio Buddha (2013)
- Kerala State Film Awards, Special Jury Award for Best Direction, Papilio Buddha (2013)
- Student Academy Awards, USA, 2011, Nominated, Documentary, Shape of the Shapeless(2010)
- City Visions, Best Documentary, 2010 Shape of the Shapeless
- City Visions, Best Cinematography
- Eastman Kodak Award for Best Cinematography
- SF SHORTS: The San Francisco International Festival of Short Films, Silver Jury Prize, 2010

=== Literature ===
- Kerala Sahitya Akademi Kanakasri Endowment Award (2002) for "Ayanam Vachana Rekhayil" ( Journey on the line of verse)(1999)
- Mathan Tharakan Award for "Ayodhanathinte Achuthantu"(axis of Combat) (1996)
- Malayalam Pathram Award
- FOKANA award for the poem 'Bhoomiyute Hrudayam'(The heart of Earth) in (1994)
