= Ambikasuthan Mangad =

Indian Malayalam language writer (born 1962)

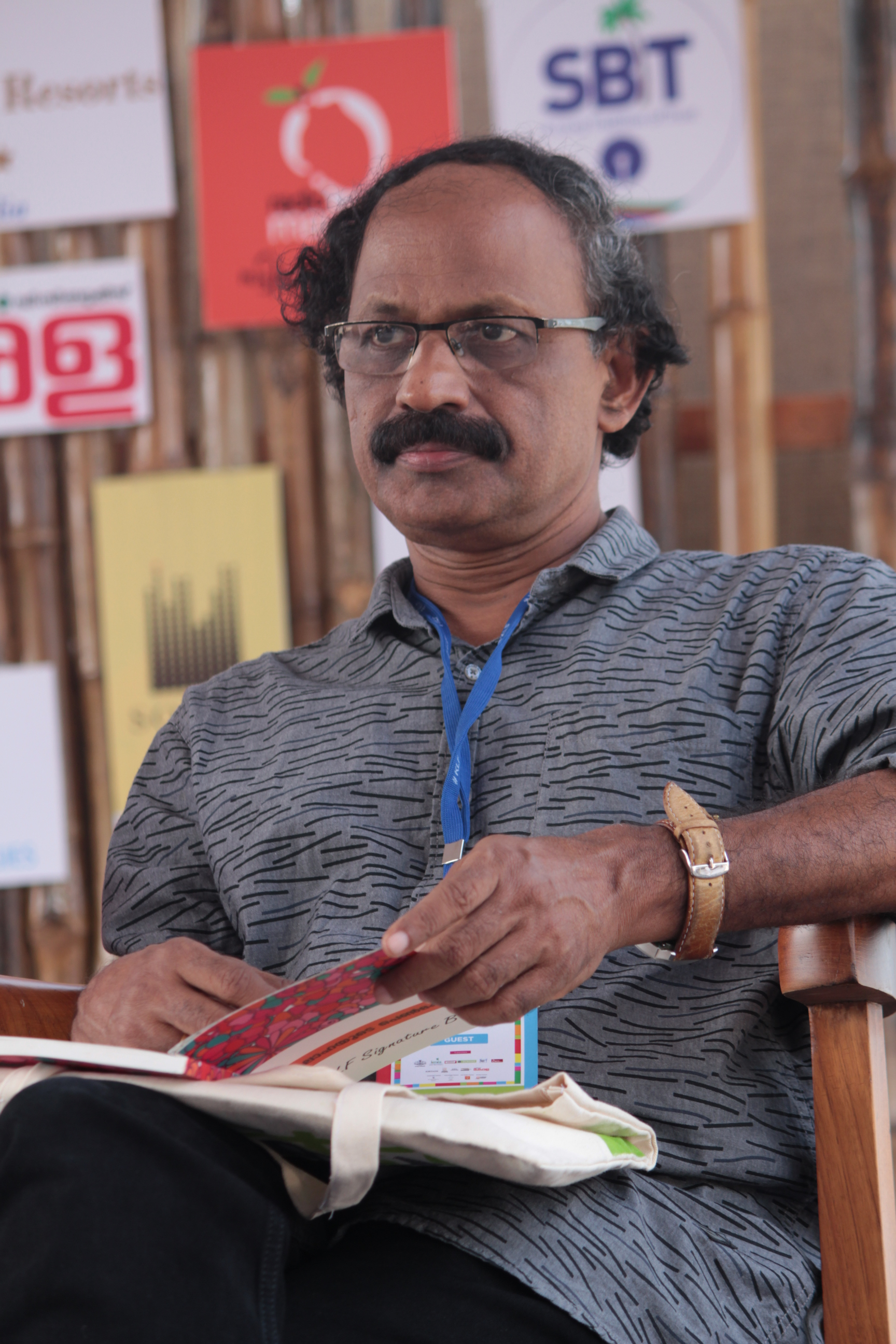
- Born: October 8, 1962 (age 64); Bare (Kasaragod), Kerala
- Occupations: writer, college professor

Ambikasuthan Mangad is an Indian Malayalam language writer. He was a professor of Malayalam at Nehru Arts and Science College, Kanhangad. His literary contributions range from short stories to novels in Malayalam. He has written more than 40 books.

He is active in protests against the known pesticide Endosulfan. His novel Enmakaje portrays the life of victims in the village Enmakaje of Kasaragod. "Neelakandan" is the famous character in this novel. His work drew international attention of the people to this malady. His book has played a major role in banning the pesticide. The novel Enmakaje has translated into English by J. Devika as Swarga. Enmakaje was translated to Tamil and Kannada languages also.

== Personal life ==
Born in Bare village in Kasargod district on 8 October 1962, Ambikasutan Mangad holds a Bachelor of Science degree in Zoology, a Master's Degree in Malayalam and an MPhil. He was a professor at Nehru College of Arts and Science, Kanhangad. Presently he's full time engaged in activism.

== Major works ==
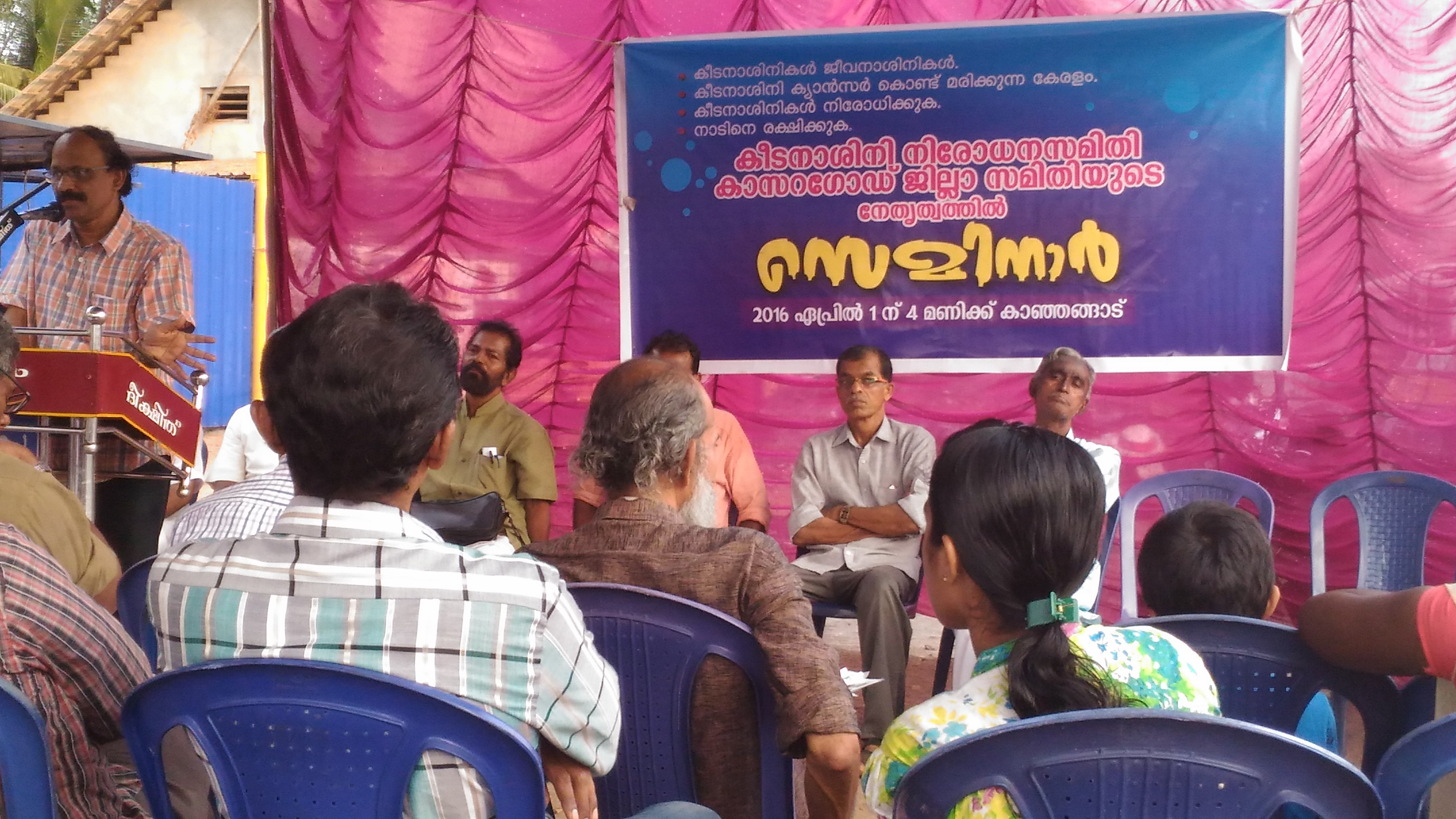
Ambikasudhan speaking in a seminar on Endosulfan at Kanhangad

1. Enmakaje (2009)
2. Randu Malsyangal
3. Neeraaliyan
4. Marakkappile theyyangal
5. Sadharana Veshangal
6. Rathri
7. Jeevithathinte Mudra
8. Othenante Vaal

== Films ==
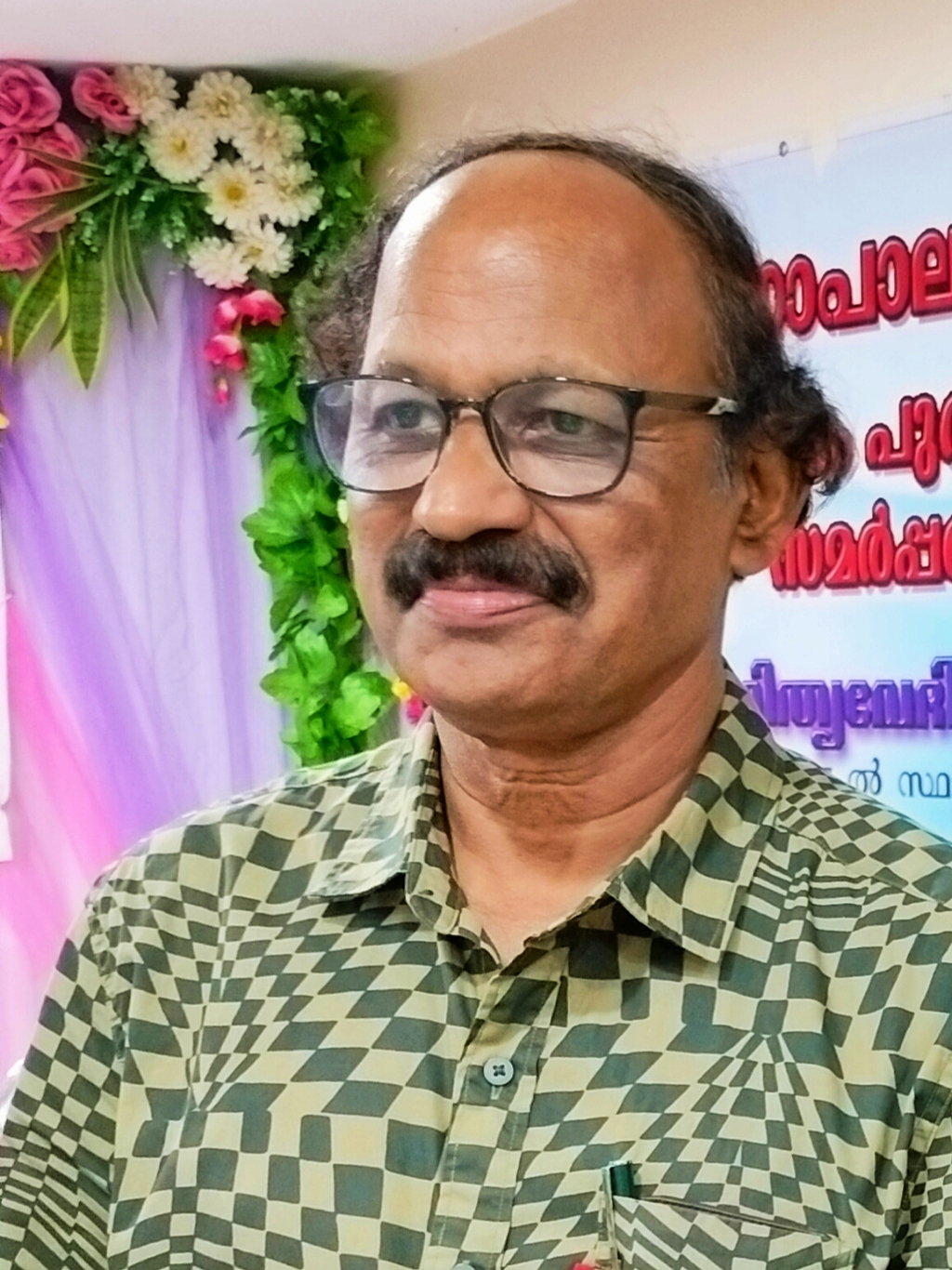
Ambikasuthan Mangad in Mumbai, March 2024

Ambikasuthan Mangad wrote the script and dialogues for critically acclaimed movie Kaiyoppu.

== Television ==
Ambikasuthan Mangad won an award for the Best Story writer from Kerala State Government for the telefilm Commercial Break.

== Awards ==
- 2000 - Commercial Break - Edasseri Memorial Award
- 2004 - Marakkappile theyyangal - Cherukad Award
- 2005 - Abu Dhabi Sakthi Award (Novel)
- 2014 - Neeraaliyan - Sathyalal Anusmaras Award
- 2015 - Prof. Sivaprasad Foundation Award for the best college teacher in Kerala
- 2017 - Ente priyappetta kadhakal (collection of short-stories) - Deshabhimani sahithya puraskaram
- 2022 - Pranavayu (collection of short-stories) - Odakkuzhal Award
- Ankanam award
- Ithal puraskaram
- V.P. Sivakumar Keli award
- Malayayattoor prize
- SBT award
- VT Bhattathirippad award
- Kovilan award

== See also ==
- Malayalam literature
- List of Malayalam-language authors
