= Brown Nation =

- Genre: Comedy
- Created by: Abi Varghese: George Kanatt; Matt Grubb
- Directed by: Abi Varghese
- Starring: Rajeev Varma; Shenaz Treasury; Omi Vaidya; Remy Munasifi; Melanie Chandra; Doug E. Doug; Jaspal Binning; Kapil Bawa; Sana Serrai; Akaash Singh
- Music by: Jakes Bejoy
- Original languages: English; Hindi; Punjabi; Gujarati
- No. of seasons: 1
- No. of episodes: 10

Production
- Producers: Naveen Chathappuram; Charles Leslie; Prakash Bare; Atit Shah; P. Ar. Subramaniam; Devarajan Venkat
- Production locations: New York City, New York, United States
- Running time: 20–25 minutes
- Production companies: Indus Media & Entertainment; Create Entertainment; Infamous Coconuts; Silicone Media

Original release
- Network: Netflix
- Release: November 15, 2016

Brown Nation is an American comedy drama series directed by Abi Varghese and written by Matt Grubb, George Kanatt and Varghese. The series is shot in New York City and the first season of the show consists of ten episodes that are 20–25 minutes long. Brown Nation released in all 190 countries offering Netflix on November 15, 2016.

Mashable's review titled its headline "Netflix newbie Brown Nation is the off-kilter Indian sitcom that's truly authentic."

== Synopsis ==
Hasmukh Parikh is a Gujarati Indian American who operates a small IT Consulting company, "Shree Ganesh Computers Limited Inc" in the Jackson Heights neighborhood of Queens, New York City, New York. Hasmukh comes from a wealthy family in the peanut business in Ahmedabad, Gujarat, India. Staffed by an uninterested and lazy cast of characters, his business flounders. His home life is not much better. His wife Dimple, a Punjabi Indian American, who is a frustrated and jobless artist, complains constantly about not having enough time to explore her creativity because of the demands of taking care of her dog, Bobby. Hasmukh tries desperately to balance his work and family, but neither seem to have his best interest at heart.

== Cast and characters ==
- Rajeev Varma as Hasmukh Parikh
- Shenaz Treasury as Dimple Parikh
- Remy Munasifi as Hyder
- Kapil Bawa as Papa ji
- Omi Vaidya as Balan Sree Ramakrishnan
- Sana Serrai as Samantha
- Johnathan Horvath as Matthew McGinley
- Akaash Singh as Mookie
- Melanie Chandra as Roli
- Jaspal Binning as Gautam
- Doug E. Doug as Lemont
- Hari Dev as Joseph
- Subodh Batra as Sunny
- Indraneil Joshi as Dhansukh Parikh
- Jayanthi Kumar as Balan's mother

== Production ==
=== Development ===
In 2007, director-writer Abi Varghese spent his weekends tossing around ideas with friends for a possible sitcom that would chronicle some of their shared experiences of growing up Indian in America. "We were doing this out of our parents' living room and we were really just starting out and trying to figure out how to tell a story [with] not much of a budget," Varghese told NBC News. Those conversations eventually became the inspiration for Akkara Kazhchakal, a Malayalam-language sitcom that landed a 30-minute slot on an Indian television station for several seasons. "That really took off after we put it on air and YouTube and it kick-started our career because it went viral and everyone was talking about it," Varghese said. After receiving positive feedback for the series (and millions of hits on YouTube), Varghese and his colleagues shifted their attention into launching a new comedy series that would appeal to a broader audience.

"The show is about the daily quirkiness that we have," Varghese told India-West. "You know, issues like marriage, five-year anniversary, little things like slices of life. We have tried to incorporate a lot of that which will be relatable to the major audiences." While speaking to NBC Varghese said "During the writing process, the team didn't set out to make anything revolutionary, or to make any big statements. The series was more of an opportunity to put 22 minutes of entertaining and relatable comedy out there for the world to watch. The team was also careful not to exaggerate or portray the characters in the series in an unrealistic manner."

Speaking to The News Minute Bare one of the producers said, "It is basically a sitcom taking a satirical look at the life of Indians and other brown-skinned communities in the backdrop of NYC. It's not a very serious or preachy depiction of the issues. The comedy really comes from the everyday activities of the characters who are into the rat race typical of city life. The cultural differences of the Indian, Middle Eastern, Chinese, Caucasian, and African American characters also helps." He added "It was widely felt that Outsourced had a local perspective of the things which didn't help in capturing the Indian situation that truthfully. We have a more balanced scripting department with talents from American as well as Indian backgrounds. That we believe has resulted in a programme which will be palatable to both the audiences."

=== Filming ===
Principal photography took place in Queens, Brooklyn, Manhattan, and New Brunswick over a 30-day period mid-2014.

=== Casting ===
Varghese cast the lead roles well before the filming of season one as he had created a trailer to pitch the show in 2012 with many of the same actors. Binning who plays Gautam said "I am incredibly proud of being a lead character in this series. The show truly showcases different parts of my Asian culture and has educated me about aspects I didn't know about before, always resulting in hilarity". "When we got into casting aspect we tried to get as many diverse and different type of actors to play it so that we mix up the comic timing," Varghese said.

== Reception ==
Mashable said "At 10 half-hour episodes, Brown Nation is an easy binge, and an enjoyable one at that. There's no singular pop culture analogy for what it feels like, but the characters are authentic in their heritage and as goofy as any sitcom could want.". The article added "What’s extra smart about Brown Nation is that it isn’t Culture 101. There are snatches of regional Indian languages. There's talk of arranged marriage and tense family relations, but handled with a key ingredient: nuance."

== Broadcast and distribution ==
Brown Nation was initially reported to be released by the Indian TV network Star Plus but eventually ended up being picked up for a global release for all 190 countries serving Netflix. The episodes are approximately twenty-two to twenty-five minutes, and are broadcast in both high-definition and 4K.

Netflix picking up the series is a hopeful sign for independent filmmakers and another step into offering a variety of diverse content to audiences, according to Varghese. "This is still an independent production and that's what I'm most proud of… this really opens the doors for a lot of independent filmmakers," he said. "I think the fact that Netflix and other platforms are open to such content is a big sign that we are headed in the right direction and in terms of diversity, and also as an independent filmmaker, I think it's good on both sides." Varghese noted that series like The Mindy Project and Master of None have tremendously paved the way for South Asian representation, but while there is progress, there are more stories to tell. "Our show is a little bit quirkier, I don't think it's as drama driven as the other two shows, but I think there's a lot more stories that we're able to explore."

Varghese is hoping for a second season of Brown Nation, but for now, he's focusing his efforts on another series called Metropark. He hopes to hold off on Brown Nation and take a closer look at the type of feedback the series elicits to see if there's enough substance for another season. "I just want to make sure that people, when they hear 'Brown Nation,' to get a smile out of it….just trying to make 22 minutes that would put a smile on people's faces after a rough day or something you can watch with your family that doesn't have any sexual innuendos or fights. Just plain, simple, comedy," Varghese said.
