= Vega Tamotia =

Australian actress

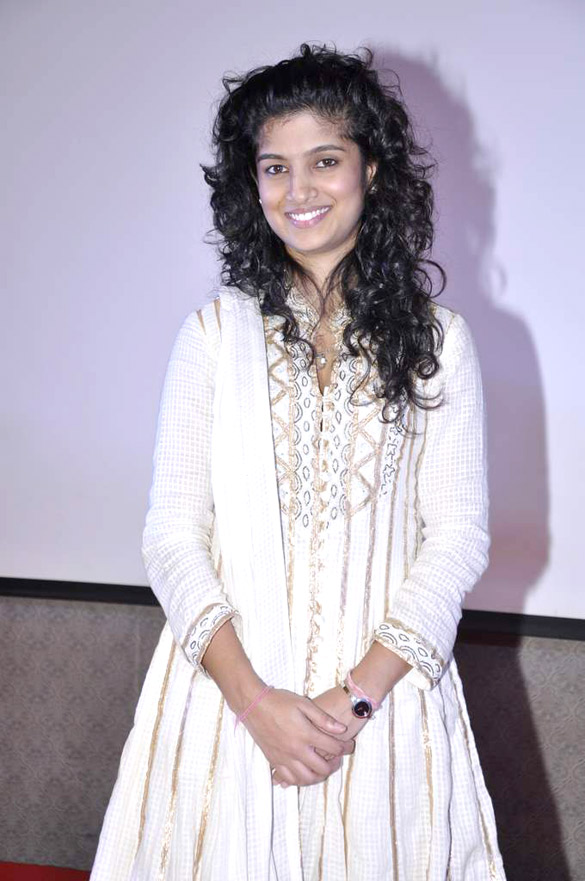
- Tamotia at the audio release of Chittagong
- Born: 7 May 1985 (age 41); Chhattisgarh, India
- Other name: Vega
- Citizenship: Australia
- Occupations: Actress; producer
- Years active: 2008–present

Vega Tamotia (born 7 May 1985 in Chhattisgarh, India), also known mononymously as Vega, is an Australian actress and producer, who has appeared in Tamil, Hindi and Telugu films. She is probably best known for her performances as Saroja in the film of the same name, and Sobikannu in Pasanga. Vega, with the motive of acting in films, earlier had been acting for Broadway Drama Troupe and gained experience in theatre arts.

== Early life ==
Tamotia was born in Chhattisgarh, but was brought up in Sydney, Australia. She did her schooling from Randwick Girls' High School. She has represented New South Wales in the YMCA Youth Parliament. She completed her education in Economics from the University of New South Wales and then attended Indian Institute of Management Bangalore as part of an exchange programme.

== Acting career ==
Having an interest in theatre and acting, Vega participated in theatre plays throughout her childhood and school. After having completed her education, she pursued professional theatre in Mumbai, when Swanand Kirkire met her and cast her as the female lead in his Hindi musical Aao Saathi Sapna Dekhein, for which she along with the rest of the cast was awarded the META (Mahindra Excellence in Theatre Award) for Best Ensemble in 2009.

Afterwards, she got the opportunity to meet Venkat Prabhu and T. Siva, director and producer of the 2008 Tamil film Saroja, who, impressed of her acting and attitude, immediately decided to cast her in the film in the title role, by which she stepped into the Indian film industry. The film was critically acclaimed and went on to become successful at the box office, with critics claiming Vega's performance was "apt" for the role. Subsequently, she was selected by prominent film maker Sasikumar to feature in his next production, Pasanga, after he had seen her portfolio. The film, based on children, upon release, became described as a "masterpiece" by critics, and went on to win two National Film Awards amongst notable regional awards. Vega's performance as a young village kindergarten teacher also received rave reviews, being dubbed as "excellent", despite claims by her that the role was diametrically opposite from her real life. She made her debut in Hindi films with the small budget coming-to age story of a girl with Aamras, though the film went unnoticed.

In 2009, she appeared in a Telugu language film, Happy Happy Gaa with Varun Sandesh and Saranya Mohan, which won good reviews by critics with a reviewer citing that Vega was the "surprise package" of the film. Vega's next release was the multi-starrer Vaanam also featuring Silambarasan, Bharath and Anushka, amongst other notable stars. Playing the role of a strong-headed rock musician with a military background, Vega has insisted that the role is very close to her real life persona. Vega then starred in Chittagong, a period film based on the Chittagong armoury raid of 1930. The film features her in the historical character of Pritilata Waddedar, a freedom fighter and was premiered in film festivals before a commercial release on 12 October 2012. Vega was also an executive producer on Chittagong. The film won four National Awards. Vega's then starred romantic comedy film Amit Sahni Ki List has her opposite Vir Das.

In 2019, Vega appeared in the hugely popular series Metro Park alongside Ranvir Shorey, Omi Vaidya, Purbi Joshi and Pitobash. This was a runaway success and she also appeared in the second season of the same series for Eros Now. The show is directed by Abi Vargese and Ajayyan Gopal and produced by Giju John.

== Producer ==
Vega has produced a number of projects including the hugely popular children's series Ghotu Motu Ki Toli. She was the executive producer for the film Chittagong and is currently the founder of Jump Across Films, a production company focussed on creating non-fiction content. Her series All Access: Capital Police was commissioned by Discovery and aired in 2019.

== Filmography ==
=== Films ===
Year	Title	Role	Language	Notes
2008	Saroja	Saroja	Tamil	credited as Vega
2009	Pasanga	Sobhikannu	Tamil	credited as Vega
2009	Aamras	Jiya Sarang	Hindi	credited as Vega
2010	Happy Happy Ga	Pooja D'Souza	Telugu	credited as Vega
2011	Vaanam	Laasya	Tamil	credited as Vega
2012	Housefull	Shanti	Telugu	credited as Vega
2012	Chittagong	Pritilata Waddedar	Hindi	Won four National Awards. Also executive produced the film
2013	Silvatein		Hindi	Short film
2014	Amit Sahni Ki List	Mala	Hindi	
2015	Love Comes Later		English	Official Selection at Cannes Critics Weeks - La Semaine de la Critique of Festival de Cannes
2016	Jai Gangaajal	Sunita	Hindi	

=== Web series ===
Year	Title	Role	Language	Notes
2019–2021	Metro Park	Kinjal	Hindi	

=== Producer ===
Year	Title	Role	Language	Notes
2012	Chittagong	Executive producer	Hindi	Winner of Four National Awards
2012	Dil Tainu Karda Ae Pyar	Associate producer	Punjabi	
2014	Ghotu Motu Ki Toli	Producer	Hindi	Children's Live Action Series
2019	All Access: Capital Police	Producer	English	TV series for Discovery Channel
2020	Still Outside, Storm Inside	Producer	English	Docu Series (in production)
