= Salalah Mobiles =

2014 Malayalam film directed by Sharath

- Theatrical-release poster
- Directed by: Sharath Haridas
- Written by: Sharath Haridas
- Produced by: Anto Joseph
- Starring: Dulquer Salmaan; Nazriya Nazim; Jacob Gregory
- Cinematography: Satheesh Kurup
- Edited by: Zian Sreekanth
- Music by: Gopi Sunder
- Production company: Anto Joseph Film Company
- Distributed by: PJ Entertainments
- Release date: 24 January 2014
- Country: India
- Language: Malayalam

Salalah Mobiles is a 2014 Indian Malayalam-language romantic comedy film written and directed by debutant Sharath A Haridasan and production controller Sanjay Padiyoor, starring Dulquer Salmaan, Nazriya Nazim, and Jacob Gregory. The film was produced by Anto Joseph Film Company and features music composed by Gopi Sunder. It was released on 24 January 2014.

== Plot ==
Afzal's mother, Safiyumma, is worried about him. Once, when his uncle comes from Salalah, Oman, he tells him he can be hired there. Afzal rejects it saying 'working is slavery'. He says that he wants to set up a mobile shop and needs funds for it. His uncle accepts it with the condition that the shop should be named 'Salalah Mobiles'. Afzal appoints his childhood friend, Binoy, as his assistant. Every morning at the bus stop in front of the shop comes a college-going girl. Afzal falls in love at first sight. He learns that her name is Shahana and that his childhood classmate and enemy Manaf has a crush on her. A few days later, he goes to Coimbatore for some stock. He meets Azhagarsamy, a genius who has made many unbelievable applications. Afzal plans to purchase some of his apps. In the bar, as they talk, Afzal calls Azhagarsamy a 'genius'. Azhagarsamy becomes excited and gifts Afzal his mobile tapping app. Afzal returns to his place, a virus spreads through messages and he suddenly hears every caller. Slowly, Manaf realizes this and, being jealous of Afzal, reveals Afzal's situation to the police.

== Cast ==
- Dulquer Salmaan as Afzal
- Nazriya Nazim as Shahana
- Santhanam as Azhagarsamy
- Jacob Gregory as Binoy
- Anwar Shereef as Abdul Manaf (Kozhi Manaf)
- Siddique as Ajay Chacko IPS
- Geetha as Safiyumma
- Narayanankutty as Ramachandran PC
- Tini Tom as Venu Maash
- Mamukkoya as Mammad
- Jose as Salauddeen
- S.P.Sreekumar as Hari, Afzal's friend
- Ramesh Pisharody as Shajahan
- Anju Sasi as a plus-two student
- Janardanan in a guest role as Kodaangi
- Raveendran in a guest role as Hawala dealer
- Nirmal Palazhi
- V. K. Sreeraman (Voice Character) as Shahana's estranged father
- Kunjan as Munna

== Production ==
Dulquer Salmaan was chosen to play the lead role. Many heroines were considered but Nazriya Nazim was given the role. Jacob Gregory who had acted alongside Dulquer in the film ABCD, was cast in a prominent role. Tamil comedian Santhanam plays a Tamilian, his Malayalam film debut. Sharath A. Haridaasan said that Santhanam plays a prominent role that manoeuvres the story to its turning point.

Shooting of the film began on 17 August 2013 at Kozhikode. The shooting locations were Kozhikode, Kodungaloor, Kottayam and Coimbatore.

== Soundtrack ==
Salala Mobiles

Soundtrack album by Gopi Sunder
- Genre: Feature film soundtrack
- Language: Malayalam

Gopi Sunder chronology
'Escape from Uganda' (2014)	Salala Mobiles (2014)	1983 (2014)

Track name	Singers	Lyrics
"La La Lasa"	Nazriya Nazim, Abi.H.M, Gopi Sunder	Sharath.A.Haridaasan, Traditional
"Eeran Kaattin"	Shreya Ghoshal	B.K.Harinarayanan
"Rasoolallah"	Gopi Sunder, Divya S. Menon, Mohammed Maqbool Mansoor	Alankode Leelakrishnan
"Eee Mohabathin"	Gopi Sunder, Mithun Jayaraj	Santhosh Varma

== Box office ==
The film collected around 4 crores in the first two weeks.

Overseas collection amounts to around US$3,196 from UK box office.
