= Peruchazhi =

- Theatrical release poster
- Directed by: Arun Vaidyanathan
- Written by: Arun Vaidyanathan; Ajayan Venugopalan (dialogues)
- Produced by: Vijay Babu; Sandra Thomas
- Starring: Mohanlal; Sean James Sutton; Ragini Nandwani; Mukesh; Baburaj; Aju Varghese; Vijay Babu
- Cinematography: Arvind Krishna
- Edited by: Vivek Harshan
- Music by: Arrora
- Production company: Friday Film House
- Distributed by: Friday Tickets (Kerala); Fox Star Studios (rest of India)
- Release date: 29 August 2014
- Running time: 154 minutes
- Country: India
- Language: Malayalam

Peruchazhi (transl. Bandicoot) is a 2014 Indian Malayalam-language political satire film written and directed by Arun Vaidyanathan. The dialogues were co-written by Ajayan Venugopalan. Vijay Babu and Sandra Thomas produced the film for Friday Film House. It features Mohanlal in the lead role, and Sean James Sutton, Ragini Nandwani, Mukesh, Baburaj, Aju Varghese, and Vijay Babu appear in supporting roles. Arrora composed the background score and soundtrack, while Arvind Krishna and Vivek Harshan did the cinematography and editing. The film received mostly negative reviews from critics.

Jagannathan (Mohanlal), an Indian politician is good at solving problems using his wit and unorthodox ideas. To get rid of him, fellow politician Francis Kunjappan (Mukesh) offers him a task he has never done before in the United States which could give him enough money to fulfill his dream of owning a sports academy. Jagannathan ends up being the chief political adviser for a struggling candidate, John Kory (Sean James Sutton), in the California governor's election campaign and uses tactics standard in Indian politics to help win the election.

Vaidyanathan got the story idea when he watched a political debate on television in the United States. He originally wrote the screenplay in Tamil and English. Ajayan Venugopalan translated it into Malayalam in 2013. The same year the film was announced, he converted it into a Malayali context. Principal photography began in mid-April 2014 in Kollam, Kerala. Set almost entirely in the United States, the majority of the film was shot in Burbank, California. Some parts were shot in Thiruvananthapuram and Kochi, where filming wrapped in July 2014.

Peruchazhi was released worldwide on 29 August 2014 on 500 screens, the widest release for a Malayalam film at the time. It was distributed in Kerala by Friday Tickets, and by Fox Star Studios in the rest of India. The film had a good opening at the box office however couldn't keep up the collections at the box-office and ended up an average grosser. The film was released on DVD on 22 December 2014.

== Plot ==
In California, Republican gubernatorial candidate John Kory is trying to raise his dismal poll numbers. Sunny Kurishingal, Kory's chief adviser, is running out of ideas to ensure Kory's victory. Sunny asks Francis Kunjappan, a Public Works Department minister in Kerala and his friend, for advice on hiring a political consultant. Kunjappan recommends his friend (and political rival) Jagannathan, hoping to rid himself of a threat to his ministerial position. Jagannathan is a politician and a talented sports enthusiast who knows no English but has a talent for solving serious problems prudently (as Kunjappan knows firsthand). However, Kunjappan thinks that Jaganathan's unorthodox ideas will fail in the United States. Kunjappan meets Jagannathan and offers him the job for ₹30 crore (₹300 million), enough to realize Jagannathan's dream project of owning a sports academy. Jagannathan accepts the assignment and flies to the US with his assistants, Pottakuzhi Jabbar and Vayalar Varkey.

They are met by Sunny, who explains the job and the US political system. Unlike India, there are only two major parties: Republican and Democratic. The Democratic Party is leading in California and their candidate, George Hope is well-liked by the public. Jagannathan must increase the Republican poll numbers, enabling them to win the election, and decides to use Indian political tactics; he influences the media, recruiting screenwriters to craft effective speeches. He meets a Chinese man, Dupli who sells counterfeit electronic equipment.

Jagannathan is also looking for a girl to marry. He meets a prostitute, Jessy and they fall in love. Kory's poll numbers are rising rapidly because of Jagannathan's tactics. One night though, Sunny and Kory visit him with bad news. Sunny tells him that a compromising video of Kory and a girl has been leaked; although all copies have been destroyed, the original is believed to be in Hope's vault room. Jagannathan takes the video from Hope's house, giving Sunny the message that the tape has been destroyed. The election campaign is declared over, and Kory is certain to win. When Sunny learns that the campaign has overshot the budget, they decide to withhold Jagannathan's fee. Sunny promises that if he makes the campaign cost-effective, he will be considered for a cabinet post.

Jagannathan asks for his fee one last time, saying that he needs it to ransom Jessy's child, but Sunny dismisses him. Knowing that he has been cheated, Jagannathan warns Sunny that he will make Kory loses the election the following day. He comes with the money, but it is not known where it came from. Kory loses the election and Hope wins and becomes the governor, which is a shock to the Republican Party. Jagannathan calls Sunny and tells him that he joined Andy and Hope, who paid his fee. With Dupli's help, Jagannathan replaced the voting machines with duplicates. The video was not completely destroyed as Jabbar had made a copy, which was then released to the media. Jagannathan and his friends return to India with Jessy, and he opens his sports academy.

== Cast ==
- Mohanlal as Jagannathan
- Sean James Sutton as John Kory
- John Wusah as Dup Lee
- Ragini Nandwani as Jessy
- Mukesh as Francis Kunjappan
- Baburaj as Pottakkuzhy Jabbar
- Aju Varghese as Vayalar Varkey
- Vijay Babu as Sunny Kurishingal
- Shankar Ramakrishnan as Sachidanandan “Andy”
- Sandra Thomas as Sunny's wife
- Ramesh Pisharody as Sathyasheelan, Francis Kunjappan's assistant
- Vyom Mathrani as Jamie
- Sanoop Santhosh as Ryan Philip (cameo appearance, reprising his character from the movie Philips and the Monkey Pen)
- Josekutty Valiyakallumkal as Toy Store Owner (cameo appearance)
- Vineeth Mohan as Kunjappan's driver (cameo appearance)
- Ashvin Mathew as Rohit aka Rohit Ji, party high command leader (cameo appearance)
- Aneesh G Menon as Joby Kuruvilla (cameo appearance)
- Poonam Bajwa as Item number (Cameo appearance)
- Delhi Ganesh as Tamil Nadu delegate (Cameo appearance)
- Ajayan Venugopalan as Flight Passenger (cameo appearance)

== Production ==
=== Writing ===
Following some unconfirmed reports, Mohanlal announced the film officially in February 2013. It was said to be a comedy and Tamil film director Arun Vaidyanathan was to be the director, making his debut in Malayalam cinema. Vaidyanathan got the idea for the script during his stay in the United States, when he watched a debate between two political leaders on television: "It was fun and something unheard of in India. I thought that would make an interesting script." According to Vaidyanathan, Peruchazhi is an original script, although Cho Ramaswamy's 1971 Tamil political satire, Muhammad bin Tughluq, which he considers is still relevant and ahead of its time, influenced the kind of humour used in the film.

Vaidyanathan wrote two drafts of the screenplay, one in English and one in Tamil. He had no plans initially to direct the film in Malayalam. When he met Mohanlal, he had an English script. After Mohanlal signed on for the project, Vaidyanathan then planned to make it in Malayalam. Writer-director Ajayan Venugopalan, known for his Malayalam television sitcom Akkara Kazhchakal (set in the US), was chosen to translate the dialogue into Malayalam; he converted the story into a Malayali context. Venugopal said, the story was inspired by political stunts that happen in India in the name of democracy. It is "a spoof-cum-satirical take on what happens when an Indian politician gets to lead a Gubernatorial election in the U. S." The characters are "larger than life" and the film was to be a tribute to Mohanlal with many references from his earlier films. He began the translation in 2013.

The title Peruchazhi refers to the bandicoot (a rodent). Of the title Vaidyanathan said: "A bandicoot has its own instincts. For instance, we have no idea where it comes from and where it vanishes to. It just appears and takes what it wants in the process. Jagannathan, the character played by Lal Sir [Mohanlal], is like that. He will do anything to win." He describes Peruchazhi as a spoof about how a politician from Kerala ends up being the chief political adviser to a state election campaign in California and the havoc he creates while chasing success there. Since Vaidyanathan wanted the protagonist to have international appeal, he named him "Ulaganathan" (conqueror of the world) in his original Tamil script; in Malayalam the name was changed to "Jagannathan", its meaning unchanged.

=== Cast and crew ===
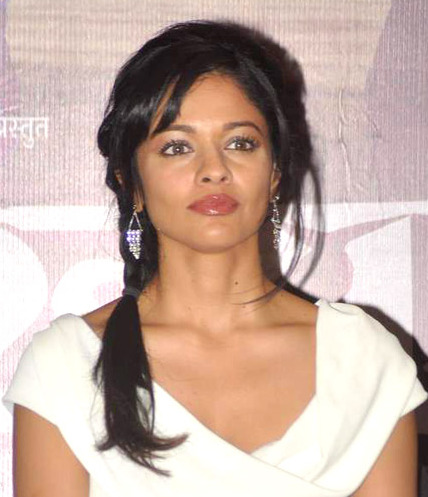
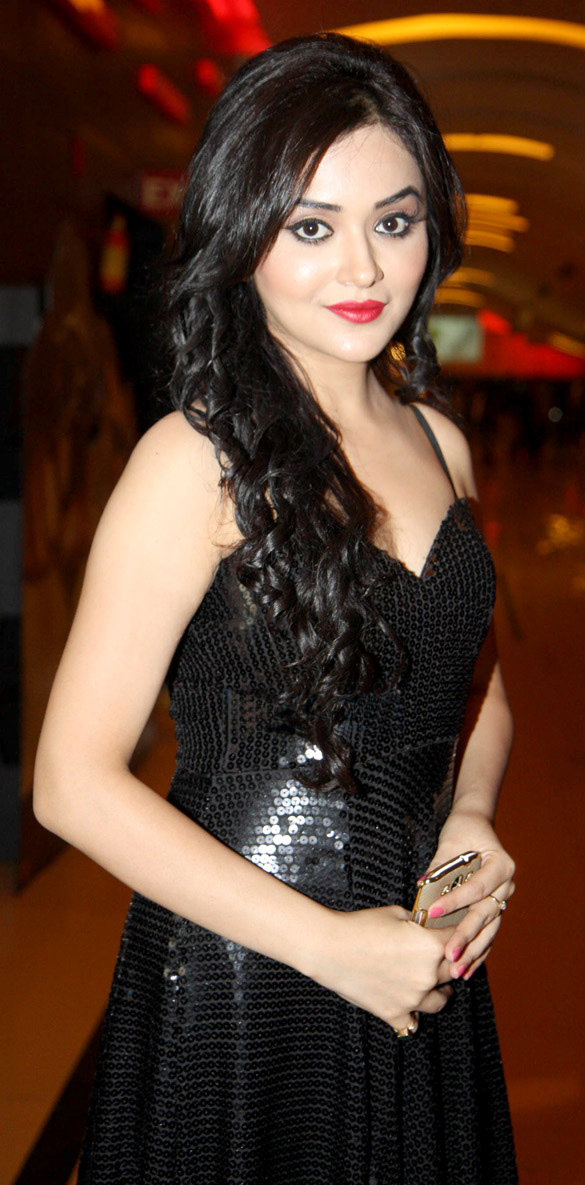
Pooja Kumar (left) was initially signed as the female lead, but she was replaced by Ragini Nandwani (right).

According to Vaidyanathan, he was not thinking of Mohanlal while writing the screenplay, but eventually after he had finished it he thought Mohanlal would be the right actor because he considers him "an amazing humourist" with "great comic timing." Mohanlal agreed to do the film right after briefing the script. Vaidyanathan's wife, a native of Kerala, suggested Mohanlal's name. He plays Jagannathan, a politician from Kerala, his crooked strategies gave him the nickname "Peruchazi". Vaidyanathan defined Jagannathan as a "gentle Chanakyan." Mukesh, who plays Francis Kunjappan, was among the first actors to be signed after Mohanlal.

In October 2013, American actress, and former Miss India USA, Pooja Kumar was announced as the heroine, making her Malayalam film debut. She was reported to be playing an Indian girl born and brought up in the United States. Baburaj and Aju Varghese were also confirmed playing comical sidekicks to Mohanlal's Jagannathan. However, in early March 2016, North Indian actress Ragini Nandwani was confirmed as the female lead; the makers zeroed in on Nandwani after considering several other actresses. In March 2014, Tamil actor Delhi Ganesh was confirmed to be making a cameo appearance. Poonam Bajwa was signed for an item number in a song.

In early April 2014, stand-up comedian turned actor Ashvin Mathew announced through his social networking pages that he had been cast in a small comic role. At the same time, producers Sandra Thomas and Vijay Babu announced that since they were travelling with the crew to the U. S. for the filming, they would also appear in the film as a cost-saving measure. Babu plays Sunny Kurishingal. Initially the producers approached a number of actors who fit the "requisites of a savvy Indian-American," but none of them was ready to afford the length filming schedule in the United States. Hence Babu himself took the part. Taiwanese-American actor John Wusah was cast as Dup Lee after attending an audition in the United States for the role. Shankar Ramakrishnan's role as an American Senator was confirmed in early June 2014. Aneesh G. Menon was confirmed in July 2014, playing a politician in the film. Vineeth Mohan got his first speaking role as Kunjappan's driver.

Arrora (Navin) composed Peruchazhi's songs and background score. Aravind Krishna was the film's cinematographer, and N. Madhusudhanan was signed to provide visual effects. M. Bawa and Julie Ziah were the art directors. Preethi S. Kanthan designed the costumes. According to Vaidyanathan, Jagannathan's dhoti (designed by Kanthan) was "inspired by ancient Roman design. The same border was used on the toga worn by Julius Caesar and his ministers. The leaf in the border denotes power." Raymonds provided the coats for the film's characters.

=== Filming ===
At an event in September 2013, Mohanlal announced that the film would begin shooting in February 2014. In March 2014, it was reported that filming would begin in the second week of April 2014. Principal photography actually began in mid-April 2014 in Kollam, Kerala. Two of the film's sequences—a fight and an item song, which take place in the U. S. were shot on a set created inside the compound of The Raviz Hotel, Kollam. The Kollam schedule was completed on 8 May 2014. Filming in Kollam for a film set in America, was criticised by some of the media in Kerala. Replying to it Vaidyanathan said in an interview: "If you are making Titanic, you don't have to build an entire ship and make it sink. The news of us shooting in the U. S. got lesser prominence in the media than the shooting in Kerala, which was there for three or four days. There are certain things that we thought would be better if we shot it here [Kollam]. What matters in the end is the content on screen."

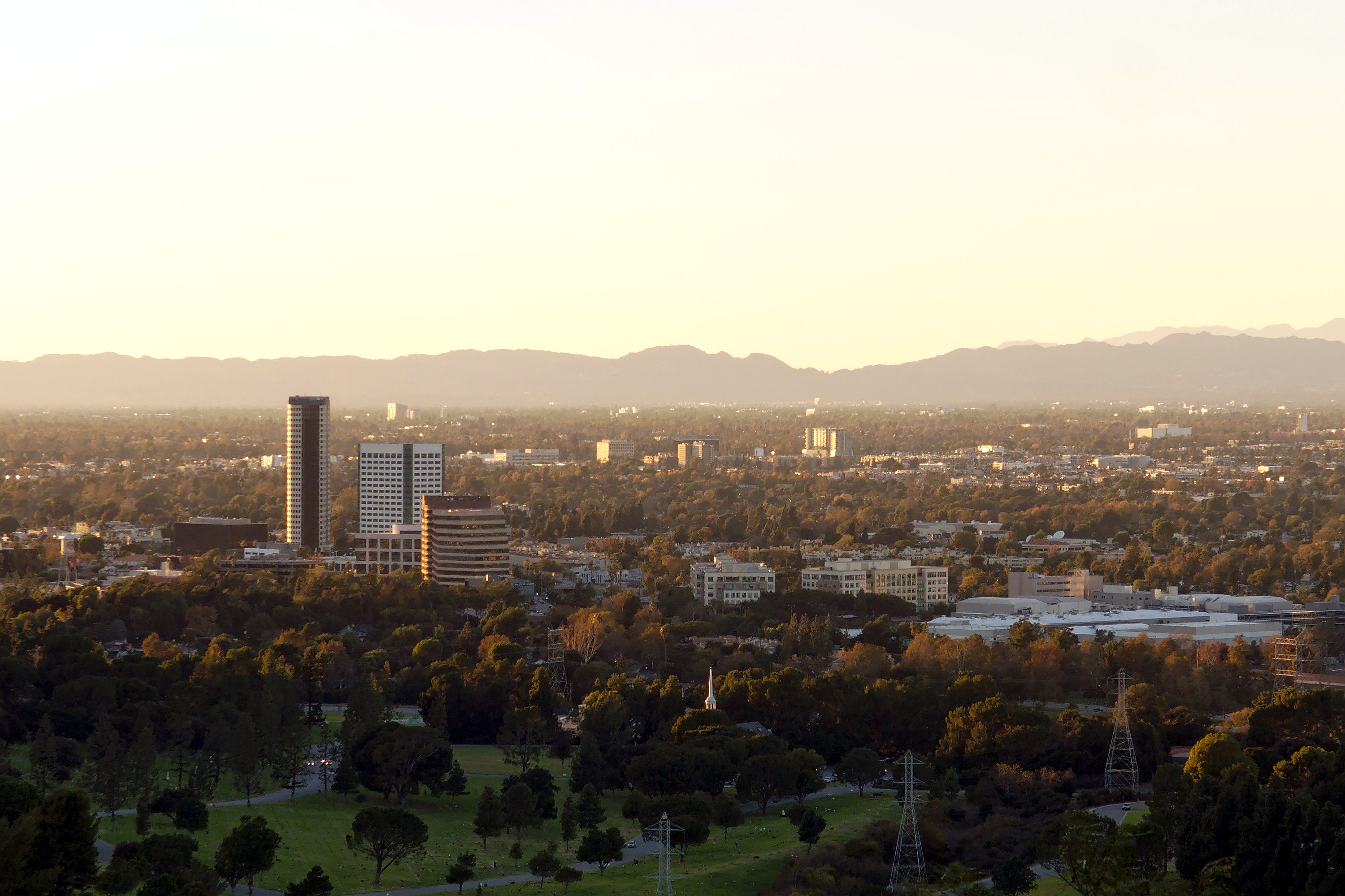
Burbank, California where most of the filming took place

The cast and crew travelled to the United States on 12 May 2014, on a schedule which was expected to wrap on 16 June 2016. Filming took place for around 35 days in America. Most of the crew members were from the U. S. and worked six hours per day. Los Angeles International Airport was one of the locations. Peruchazhi was filmed almost entirely in Burbank, California, near Hollywood in Los Angeles. In early June 2014, Vaidyanathan said that almost 60 percent of the filming had been completed. It is the first Malayalam film to be shot at Universal Studios in Los Angeles. The production cost was around ₹4.5 crore (₹45 million) for the U. S. schedule.

Although Peruchazhi is mostly set in the U. S., the film opens and ends in Kerala, for which a number of scenes were shot in Kochi and Thiruvananthapuram. The film wrapped on 5 July at Sacred Heart College in Thevara, Kochi. Peruchazhi was made using the Auro 11.1 sound format, making it the second Malayalam film to use it; the first was Swapaanam (2014), directed by Shaji N. Karun. According to Sandra Thomas, Peruchazhi cost four times more than the average Malayalam film. The film's total production cost is estimated to be ₹10 crore (₹100 million).

== Music ==
Naveen "Arrora" Iyer composed the film's original soundtrack and background score. Perruchazhi was Arrora's debut as a composer for Malayalam cinema. He had worked before as a flautist for A. R. Rahman. The soundtrack consists of six tracks written by Rajeev Nair, R. Venugopal, and Blaaze. The label Think Music released the soundtrack album, on 30 July 2014.

== Release ==
The film's release date was announced in early July 2014 during the final stage of filming. Peruchazhi was released on 29 August 2014 in 500 screens worldwide, the widest release for a Malayalam film at that point. The film was distributed by Friday Tickets in Kerala and Fox Star Studios elsewhere in India. Peruchazhi was the first Malayalam film to be released simultaneously in the United States and India. PJ Entertainment distributed the film in Europe, while Achu & Achu's Creations handled distribution in Australia. The Middle East release was on 4 September 2014 — a premiere was held on the same day in the Golden Cinema theatre in Dubai. Friday Home Cinema and Empire Video released Peruchazhi on DVD on 22 December 2014. The film was broadcast on television by Amrita TV; it premiered in Vishu on 14 April 2015.

=== Marketing ===
The first-look poster for Peruchazhi was unveiled at Dreams Hotel in Kochi in April 2014, in conjunction with the 111-day celebration of the Friday Film House venture Philips and the Monkey Pen. Friday Peeps handled the film's promotion and advertising. A conceptual photoshoot was conducted separately to create the posters. The film's advertisers mounted a campaign in which Mohanlal's character gradually becomes more detailed. On 21 May 2014, Mohanlal's 54th birthday, Friday Film House released a 34-second trailer. A full-length trailer was released on 1 August 2014 which, according to Zee News, "created a buzz in social media." It was the most viewed Malayalam film trailer receiving 150,000 views in 12 hours. Peruchazhi was promoted in train stations served by the Parasuram and Ernad Express, using wrap advertising with images, logos and posters of the film throughout the trains. The production team introduced a strategy game app, developed by Raklin, titled "Be a Peruchazhi" for the Android platform on 25 August 2014.

== Reception ==
=== Critical response ===
Nicy V. P. of the International Business Times gave the film four stars out of five, calling it a "clean entertainer." She wrote, "The film has a few moments, which will take you back to good old days of Mohanlal film. If you are a Mohanlal fan, the film will be a feast for you and Arun Vaidyanathan has nailed a good political satire for this festive season." Aswin J. Kumar of The Times of India gave the film three out of five stars, noting: "The attempt at political satire in this film is feeble, mindless and boring. It's more like a mask over disfigurement, for there is hardly any scope for satire in a narrative riddled with superfluous acts of a star who has begun to show signs of insecurity."

Sujit Chandra Kumar of Deccan Chronicle gave the film two-and-a-half stars out of five, writing: "Arun Vaidyanathan has packed [the film] with so much spice that even if one ingredient fails to please, there is still something else for that die-hard fan." Malayala Manorama critic Arathi Kannan also awarded it two-and-a-half stars out of five: "'Peruchazhi' is an exaggerated belief of a mediocre idea. And how it ends, reinforces the aforementioned statement! It isn't so much a political mockery, as a political idiocy. But as for undying loyalties, the star with his 'mundu' action, alternatively 'suited and booted' is quite hoot-inspiring," the director has "randomly put in some Mohanlal nostalgia from yonder. Once, twice, it's okay. The eleventh time, you'd start to think the movie has slowly transformed into an Onam cassette of sorts, a compilation of yesteryear Mohanlal gems."

Paresh C. Palicha of Rediff.com rated it two out of five stars, saying the film is "not up to the mark especially since it underutilises an actor of Mohanlal's caliber...it can easily pass off as a television programme, a tribute to the long innings of Mohanlal, one of the most mesmerising actors to grace the Indian screen...every comic sequence is punctuated by a reference to one of Mohanlal's films or lines from one of those films. This strategy becomes cumbersome after a while."

Writing for The New Indian Express, Pramod Thomas criticised the script, saying "the sequences where the intelligence of the protagonist is shown as an election-winning tactic are difficult to chew ... the screening of yesteryear scenes from the popular Mohanlal starrers seems to be okay in the beginning, but with weary repetition, even the hardcore fans will lose patience." The critic from Sify called it "average," and said: "In all fairness, the initial moments of the film are pretty fine and more so, when compared to the rest of the film ... Mohanlal's comic lines and sequences from his yesteryear hits are used ... in the first half, in an impressive way." He described the second half as "boring" with "inane scenes that go on and on," calling it far from entertaining. He also criticised the "poor" script.

=== Box office ===
Peruchazhi had an opening-day gross of ₹3 crore (₹30 million), the highest worldwide opening for a Malayalam film till then. According to Sify, the film's box-office receipts fell over the following weeks. The film released in the United Kingdom on 9 September 2014, grossed a total of $46,265 from 16 screens in two weekends.
