= English (2013 film) =

2013 Malayalam-language satire film

- Directed by: Shyamaprasad
- Written by: Ajayan Venugopalan
- Produced by: Binu Dev
- Starring: Jayasurya; Nivin Pauly; Mukesh; Nadhiya; Remya Nambeesan
- Cinematography: Udayan Ambady
- Edited by: Vinod Sukumaran
- Music by: Rex Vijayan
- Production company: Navarang Screens
- Distributed by: Navarang Screens
- Release date: 24 May 2013
- Country: India
- Language: Malayalam

English: An Autumn in London is a 2013 Indian Malayalam-language satire film written by Ajayan Venugopalan and directed by Shyamaprasad. The film stars Jayasurya, Nivin Pauly, Mukesh, Nadhiya and Remya Nambeesan in lead roles. The film is produced by Binu Dev under the banner of Navarang Screens. The film revolves around the lives of several Malayalees living in London.

== Plot ==
The lives of five characters from diverse backgrounds whose passage to the U.K. and its aftermath are dealt with in the film. Jayasurya plays Shankaran, a Kathakali artiste-turned-waiter who is an illegal immigrant. Nivin Pauly dons the role of Sibin, an IT executive with a roving eye. Mukesh plays Joy, a middle-class corner store owner with an extended family in London and all its concomitant problems and advantages. Nadia Moidu plays Saraswathy, a Tamil Brahmin. Married to a doctor, she has been in the U.K, for more than 20 years. Remya Nambeesan plays Gauri, a young married woman from a rustic background who arrives in London.

== Cast ==
- Jayasurya as Shankaran
- Nivin Pauly as Sibin
- Mukesh as Joy
- Nadhiya as Saraswathy
- Remya Nambeesan as Gauri Rajesh/Ammu
- Sona Nair as Sally, Joy's wife
- Murali Menon as Dr. Ram, Saraswathy's husband
- Sinu Pillai as Rajesh, Sibin's friend
- Josekutty Valiyakallumkal as Siju, Shankaran's friend
- Vijayalekshmi as Sruthi, Saraswathy's friend
- Varada Sethu as Meghana Scariah
- Manoj Shiva
- Viji Varghese
- Baldwin Simon
- Mujeeb
- Rincy BinuDev as Haseena.

== Production ==
=== Development ===
Ajayan and Shyamaprasad met during the screening of Elektra in New York City. The two got talking and they decided to work on a movie together.

Shyamaprasad chose to direct Ajayan Venugopalan's story after many thoughts and preparations. Ajayan Venugopalan, a Malayali techie based in New Jersey had already earned fame in the industry as the script writer and co-director of the popular sitcom Akkara Kazhchakal based on the life of Malayalis in the United States. English is his first attempt in a mainstream Malayalam film. The director also used the short-story titled 'Chila Theerumanangal' (ചില തീരുമാനങ്ങള്‍) by Nirmala Thomas, a writer based in Canada, as one of the source narrative.

=== Casting ===
The film was announced to star Jayasurya, Nivin Pauly, Nadia Moidu, Remya Nambeesan, Mukesh, and Sona Nair. Incidentally, earlier this year during the 100th-day celebration of Beautiful in Thiruvananthapuram, Jayasurya had suggested his aspiration to work with the director, and to consider him for a role for the latter's next and Shyamaprasad promptly replied that he would call the actor when he has a role that is apt for him. The time had finally come when Shyamaprasad called to say that he wanted Jayasurya to do a character in English. The actor had earlier said that he has always harboured a wish to work with Shyamaprasad because of what he has heard of the director from his co-stars. Shyamaprasad is known for moulding his characters so well, motivating the actors and giving them the strongest platform to perform. Jayasurya also had said it could be the actor in Shyamaprasad that helps him give such importance even to the minute nuances. Jayasurya was chosen to play the character of a Kathakali artiste who absconds while touring in England. Living as an illegal immigrant becomes too difficult for him as he is in constant fear of being caught. The mental ordeal adds more layers to the character which Jayasurya plays. Nadia Moidu was chosen to play a prominent role in the film. Nivin Pauly was chosen to play another leading role after his performance in the 2012 film Thattathin Marayathu. Akkara Kazhchakal fame Josekutty Valiyakallumkal who played the character of George Thekkinmootil in the popular sitcom was chosen to play a supporting role in the film, due to the connection of him and the scriptwriter from the sitcom.

=== Filming ===
The puja of the film was held on 16 September 2012 at Thiruvananthapuram in which all the cast and crew attended. Shooting started on 17 October 2012 in London. The director of photography is Udayan Ambaadi. Actor Murali Menon went to London early before the shoot for the pre-production work. The film is the second Malayalam film to have scenes shot by the Helicam; a remote controlled mini-helicopter captures aerial shots with the help of a video camera. Sync sound, which means the actors will record the dialogues during the shoot itself, was used in the film. This was to add to the realistic feel of the film.

Initially, the film was to be shot in the United States but due to logistical problems that cropped up, English was transported to the U.K. A few changes were made in the script after the location was fixed. Basildon was also a primary location in which the shoot had begun in. The whole film was shot during the autumn of the year 2012. Shyamaprasad who was in the UK for his masters (in Hull University) during the late 1980s says, "The dark underbelly of London was haunting and cajoled me with ideas for a movie." Kerala has not been shown in the movie at all.

== Soundtrack ==
English

Soundtrack album by Rex Vijayan
- Released: 21 May 2013
- Genre: Feature film soundtrack
- Length: 19:29
- Label: Mathrubhumi Music
- Producer: Rex Vijayan

Rex Vijayan chronology
Second Show (2012)	English (2013)	Neelakasham Pachakadal Chuvanna Bhoomi (2013)

The soundtrack for the film was launched on 21 May 2013 at an event hosted in Kochi. The album, released by Mathrubhumi Music contains five songs composed by Rex Vijayan and penned by Shibu Chakravarthy and Engandiyoor Chandrasekharan. For the first time ever, American clarinet player and music composer Shankar Tucker collaborates for a Malayalam song in English. The song "Aakashamey" is rendered by singer-actor Rohan Kymal, with Shankar playing the clarinet in it. "Scored by Rex Vijayan, the music was composed and sent to Rohan and Tucker. Then we interacted via Skype to fine-tune it. It has come out very well. This song is the anthem of the film," says filmmaker Shyamaprasad.

According to the director, "The film's music has a multicultural flavour. And a unique mixing of fusion adds to its charm. Rex Vijayan, the composer, takes you to the world of music that is unheard of."

English - Original motion picture soundtrack
No.	Title	Lyrics	Singer(s)	Length
1.	"Mayumee"	Engandiyoor Chandrasekharan	Remya Nambeesan	4:24
2.	"Akaashame"	Engandiyoor Chandrasekharan	Rohan Kaimal	4:12
3.	"Nila Vaname"	Shibu Chakravarthy	Job Kurian	4:02
4.	"Shalabhamai"	Shibu Chakravarthy	Neha Nair	3:03
5.	"Tharame"	Shibu Chakravarthy	Suchith Suresan	3:48
Total length:				19:29

== Reception ==
Jisha G. Nair of Malayala Manorama rated the film 3 in a scale of 5 and said, "If you love to watch films that have different shades of life, English, directed by Shyamaprasad is an apt choice." The critic added, "The director has done a brave attempt to entertain the mass. The songs, humour and satire will appeal to a large group of audience. This may be the first time Shyamaprasad has come out from his typical style of film making to entertain the viewers. Yet he has marked his signature in the film without compromising much." The critic was all praise for the film's script, music, cinematography and acting by all the lead performers.
