= Jacob Gregory =

Indian American actor (born 1986)

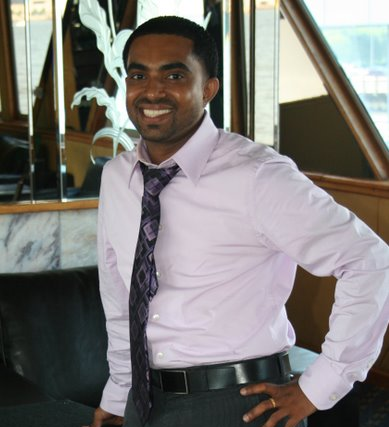
- Jacob on set of Akkara Kazhchakal, 2008
- Born: 20 February 1986 (age 40)
- Occupation: Actor
- Years active: 2008 – 2024

Jacob Gregory is an Indian-American actor who has appeared in Malayalam films. He made his film debut in the film ABCD (2013) directed by Martin Prakkat. He got a breakthrough role in the TV series Akkara Kazhchakal, where he portrayed the character Gregory also known as "Giri Giri". Gregory has lived in New Jersey since 1990.

== Career ==
Before working in the film industry, he played a character in the sitcom Akkara Kazhchakal. His character was well received by audiences along with the sitcom. He was able to tour across the United States, Canada, and the European Union; performing shows on a variety of stages based on Akkara Kazhchakal. A mutual friend suggested Gregory's name to Martin Prakkat when the director was looking for someone to play the lead along with Dulquer Salmaan for the film ABCD as Korah.

== Filmography ==
Key
†	Denotes films that have not yet been released

Year	Title	Role	Notes
2008-2010	Akkara Kazhchakal	Gregory (Girigiri)	Television series on Kairali TV
2011	Akkarakazhchakal: The Movie	Girigiri	
2013	ABCD	Korah	Film debut
2014	Salalah Mobiles	Binoy	
2014	1983	Sachin	
2014	Vegam	Daveed	
2014	Bhaiyya Bhaiyya	Sidekick	
2015	Ennum Eppozhum	Maathan	
2015	100 Days of Love	Bahadur (Njaramban)	
2015	Chirakodinja Kinavukal	Santhosh Balaji	
2015	Lord Livingstone 7000 Kandi	Ananthakrishnan Iyer	
2016	Karingunnam Sixes	Bruno	
2017	Jomonte Suvisheshangal	Mushtaq	
2017	Parava	Mujeeb	
2017	Pokkiri Simon	Biju	
2018	Kalyanam	Saiju	Also playback singer for "Dhritangapulakithan"
2018	Mandharam	Tuttu	
2019	Sakalakalashala	Akku's friend	
2019	Soothrakkaran	Shibu Mon	
2019	Unda	Varghese Kuruvila	
2020	Maniyarayile Ashokan	Ashokan	Also producer and playback singer for "Unnimaya"
2021	Djibouti	Aby	
2024	Secret	Prince	
