= How to Follow Strangers =

- Directed by: Chioke Nassor
- Written by: Chioke Nassor
- Starring: Ilana Glazer, Chris Roberti, Eunice Anderson, Akaash Singh
- Release date: 28 October 2013
- Country: United States

How to Follow Strangers is a 2013 drama film written and directed by Chioke Nassor. It opened The Lower East Side Film Festival in June 2013.

== Synopsis ==
A young man named Casey (Chris Roberti) becomes obsessed with an urban tragedy and disappears, wondering if anyone will notice. Eleanor (Ilana Glazer), a lonely young lady who shares his commuting schedule does notice. And when he resurfaces, she decides to follow him, setting of a chain of events that bind them together.

== Cast ==
- Ilana Glazer as Eleanor
- Chris Roberti as Casey
- Eunice Anderson as Anne
- Wrenn Schmidt as Shelly
- Kelly McCreary as Claire
- Hannah Bos as Meredith
- Dan Shaked as Tom
