= ABCD: American-Born Confused Desi (2013 film) =

- Theatrical release poster
- Directed by: Martin Prakkat
- Written by: Martin Prakkat; Naveen Bhaskar; Sooraj-Neeraj
- Produced by: Shibu Thameens
- Starring: Dulquer Salman; Jacob Gregory; Tovino Thomas; Aparna Gopinath
- Cinematography: Jomon T. John
- Edited by: Don Max
- Music by: Gopi Sunder
- Production company: Thameens Films
- Distributed by: Thameens Films; Tricolor Entertainments
- Release date: 14 June 2013
- Running time: 167 minutes
- Country: India
- Language: Malayalam
- Budget: ₹4.5 crore

ABCD: American-Born Confused Desi is a 2013 Indian Malayalam-language black comedy film directed by Martin Prakkat, and produced by Shibu Thameens under the banner of Thameens Films. It stars Dulquer Salmaan, Jacob Gregory, Tovino Thomas, and Aparna Gopinath. The film features music composed by Gopi Sunder, and cinematography by Jomon T. John. The film deals with the journey of two young Malayali Americans to Kerala. The title is based on the term American-Born Confused Desi. Released on 14 June 2013, the film received positive reviews and was commercially successful. It marked the first collaboration between Dulquer Salmaan and Martin Prakkat. The film was remade into Telugu in 2019 with the same name.

== Plot ==
The story revolves around two rich, spoilt brats who were born in the United States. John Isaac and his cousin Korah Murikken. John is the son of a millionaire named Isaac John, who is settled in New York, while Korah's mother left for Paris with her new husband. Johns and Korah enjoy their luxurious lives by driving expensive cars, going to pubs and nightclubs, and playing pranks on the public. Isaac decides to send both of them to India, saying that it is a vacation before Johns goes to Melbourne for his MBA studies the next month. He then blocks Johns and Korah's credit cards post their arrival in India. Johns and Korah initially stay at a luxurious hotel apartment unaware that their credit cards are useless. Upon realizing their financial situation, they try to escape from the apartment to avoid paying. However, they are caught by the security guard. He brings them to the manager who then confiscates their mobile phones, tablets PCs and wrist watches. Isaac provides Johns and Korah with very poor accommodation with water from the nearby community dug well and a public toilet. They try to make money through underhand methods but are duped. With all of their money gone, they are left with no choice but to join the MBA studies at a local university that Isaac arranged for them, along with ₹5000 monthly for their combined expenses, provided they attend their classes regularly.

They befriend a student and social worker, Madhumitha, from their college. Johns, out of romantic interest, takes part in Madhumita's social works and protests during which they get to know each other better. One of Madhumita's friends Seenamol, a journalist, publishes a fabricated article on Johns and Korah's poor upbringing and how they manage to survive on just ₹ 83 per day, which gains widespread popularity, making Johns and Korah overnight public figures. This triggers Akhilesh, the son of the late minister K. P. Ravi Varma, whose government claimed that ₹ 28 per day is enough to survive in the current economy. Johns and Korah's popularity is on the rise along with their frustration. Battling sociopolitical issues on their journey they realize one day that their only way to go back to the U.S. is by winning a competition called Youth Icon of the year and the prize money of ₹100,000. So, they participate in a protest which ends up in a police baton charge. This raises their popularity and votes in the competition, much to the disappointment of Akhilesh, who is a candidate in the upcoming election. Seeing the duo's bravery, Naxalite representatives approach them and give them a handgun seeking their support in future. Johns & Korah realize things are getting out of hand and go AWOL, but later are found to have taken refuge at Madhumita's house.

Madhumita loans them money to go back to the US. However, Akhilesh tracks them down and confiscates their passports. Johns fights off Akhilesh but surrenders to law enforcement agencies. The ministry confirms in a press conference that Johns and Korah are not Indian citizens and, thus, are not legally allowed to be involved in sociopolitical matters of India and are hence being deported. Now back in America, Johns and Korah return Madhumita's loan while also expressing Johns' romantic interest in her but Madhumita has other plans. As the movie ends, during the family prayer, an anonymous person arrives in front of the duo's house and shouts for revenge for one of Johns' earlier pranks. Johns and Korah escape through the back door.

== Cast ==
- Dulquer Salmaan as Johns Isaac
- Jacob Gregory as Korah Murikken
- Tovino Thomas as Akhilesh Varma
- Aparna Gopinath as Madhumitha (voice dubbed by Angel Shijoy)
- Lalu Alex as Dr. Isaac John, Johns' father
- Sajini Zacharia as Susan, Johns' mother
- Vijayaraghavan as Chief Minister P. K. Ravi Varma
- S. P. Sreekumar as Lloyd Fernandes
- Sijoy Varghese as Police Commissioner
- Shivaji Guruvayoor as Vennala Gopalan
- Kalpana as Selinamma
- Dinesh Panicker as Shekharan Pillai
- Nandhu as Kunjachan
- Chembil Ashokan as Scaria "Kuriachan"
- Thampi Antony as Thampi
- Kalasala Babu as Chief Minister
- Anand as Pothen
- Surabhi Lakshmi as Seenamol
- Kalabhavan Navas as Saji
- Abi Varghese as Sebastin, Johns's and Korah's cousin
- Anjali Nair as Newsreader
- Krishna Prasad as Showroom manager
- Samson Matthew Valiyaparambil as College Professor
- Santhakumari as Colony lady
- Hakim Shahjahan as College student

== Production ==
The project was announced a few months before its shoot, but acquiring the licence to shoot in the US delayed the commencement of the project. Initially many actresses were considered for the heroine including Isha Talwar, but theatre artist Aparna Gopinath was selected for the role in her debut film. Jacob Gregory, a mutual friend of Martin played the character of Korah. He himself showed interest in playing Korah and auditioned for the role. He had been part of the film from the scripting process itself.

=== Filming ===
The shooting was announced to start in March 2013 in the U.S. New York City was the main location for the scenes shot in America. The original plan was to start the shooting of the film in the U.S. but that had to be changed after it became difficult to get the required permission and the visas. So the schedules were altered and the scenes in Kerala were wrapped up first. The college scenes were shot inside the Federal Institute of Science And Technology (FISAT), Angamaly. The filming of a few 'montage cuts' for showing in between the songs were shot at the college.

== Soundtrack ==
ABCD

Soundtrack album by Gopi Sundar
- Released: 6 June 2013
- Genre: Film soundtrack
- Length: 25:32
- Language: Malayalam
- Label: Manorama Music
- Producer: Gopi Sundar

Gopi Sundar chronology
Sound Thoma (2013)	ABCD (2013)	5 Sundarikal (2013)

The music of the film is from Gopi Sundar. The soundtrack features a remixed version of the song "Nayaapaisayilla" sung by Mehaboob for the 1960 film Neelisaali. This version is sung by Junior Mehaboob.

Track listing
No.	Title	Lyrics	Singer(s)	Length
1.	"Johnny Mone Johnny"	Santhosh Varma, Anna Katharina Valayil	Dulquer Salmaan, Anna Katharina Valayil	4:32
2.	"Sivane"	Santhosh Varma	Suchith Suresan	4:25
3.	"Vaanam"	Rafeeq Ahammed	Gopi Sundar, Anna Katharina Valayil	4:20
4.	"Nayapaisayilla (Remix)"	P. Bhaskaran	Junior Mehboob, Anna Katharina Valayil, Asif Akber, San Jaimt	4:20
Total length:				25:32

== Release ==
The film was released on 14 June 2013.

=== Critical reception ===
Unni R Nair of Kerala9 stated that the movie is a "confused mess to an extent" and was "not up to the mark", but gave 3.5 stars in a scale of 5. Sudheer Shah, writing for IndiaGlitz, awarded the movie 6.5 stars out of 10, concluding that "ABCD is one movie that must not be taken with any bit of seriousness." and that "If you have a few hours to laugh out for simple jokes that are not that intelligent, this is your movie." Shekhar of OneIndia gave the movie 3/5 stars, called the movie "a wonderful comedy entertainer, which has an interesting story" and said that "If you are comedy lover, don't miss to watch this film." Aswin J Kumar of The Times of India wrote that the movie is "watchable for the chemistry between Johns and Kora", giving it 3 stars. Rahul of Metro Matinee rated the movie as Entertaining, while stating that "it entertains in full throttle, asks the right questions and provides moments of emotional ecstasy and angst, all of which is part and parcel of a feel good movie." Paresh C Palicha of Rediff awarded the movie 2.5 stars, and wrote that the movie "is a showcase for Dulquer Salmaan; nothing more, nothing less."

=== Box office ===
The film became a commercial success. The film collected $48,711(₹36.31 lakhs) in three weeks from the United Kingdom box office. The film collected around ₹12.5 crore from Kerala box office. The film ran 101 days in theatres.
