= Suchith Suresan =

Indian playback singer

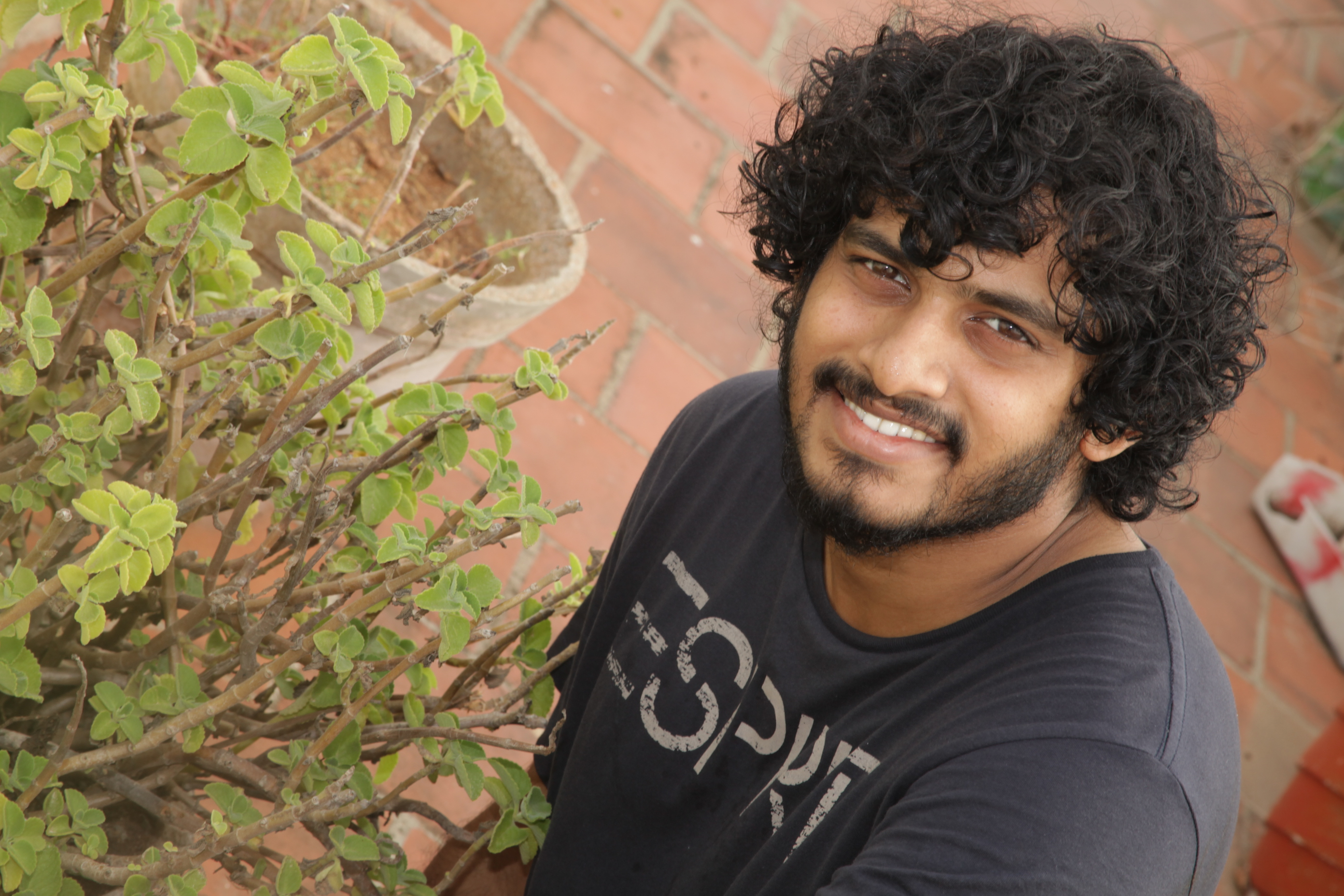
- Born: 24 August 1987 (age 39); Trivandrum, Kerala, India
- Occupation: Playback singer
- Years active: 2008–present
- Spouse: Nimi Chandrika

Suchith Suresan (born 24 August 1987) is an Indian playback singer in the Tamil, Telugu, Malayalam and Kannada film industries.

== Personal life ==
Suchith Suresan was born to C. Suresan, a retired government servant and a reputed painter who focuses in oil-on-canvas; and K.P. Sucheeta, a retired banker, on 25 August 1987 at Trivandrum. He joined Madras Christian College Chennai for a degree in visual communications. He is married to Nimi Chandrika. He has an elder brother, Dr. Surej, who plays drums for an alternate-rock band based in Trivandrum called SPASM and is also an assistant surgeon in the health service department of the Govt. of Kerala.

== Career ==
Suresan made his debut with the song "Pulayodu" from Saadhu Mirandaal, and reached fame with the song "Karigalan" from Vettaikaaran, composed by Vijay Antony.

Since then, he has lent his voice to many films, including Chikku Bukku and Nanban.

His contributions to the soundtrack of Dam 999 earned him a nomination on the preliminary list for the 84th Academy Awards (Oscars).

Suresan sang the jingle for the Radio Mango 91.9 FM, composed by Deepak Dev, which scored the World Bronze Award (2009) for best station jingle at the New York Festivals.

Suresan studied Carnatic and Hindustani music under gurus Sri. Aryanadu Raju and composer Sri. Ramesh Narayan.

He is the lead vocalist of the indie rock band Udaan.

== Discography ==
Year	Song	Album	Language	Composer
2008	Puyalodu Mothidum; Theme of Saadhu Mirandaa	Sadhu Miranda	Tamil	Deepak Dev
2009	Karigalan	Vettaikaaran	Tamil	Vijay Antony
2009	Pularumo	Ritu	Malayalam	Rahul Raj
2010	Ye Vaipuga	Orange	Telugu	Harris Jayaraj
2010	Azhagu Katteri	Goripalayam	Tamil	Sabesh–Murali
2010	Smile Smile	Chikku Bukku	Tamil	Colonial Cousins
2010	Thirumbi Thirumbi	Vande Mataram	Tamil / Malayalam	D. Imman
2010	Sexykara	Sadhyam	Telugu	Chinni Charan
2010	Vizhigalil Vizhundhaval; Oru Naal Mazhai; Penne Nee	Vizhiyil Vizhundhaval	Tamil	Pollock
2011	Innum Enna Thozha	7am Arivu	Tamil	Harris Jayaraj
2011	Ara Kirukkan	Vengayam	Tamil	Bharani
2011	Karuppu Perazhaga	Muni 2: Kanchana	Tamil	S. Thaman
2011	Dam 999 Theme Song; Dakkanaga	Dam 999	English / Malayalam	Ouseppachan
2011	Yare yene Halidaru	Kal Manja	Kannada	Emil
2012	Swasye Agipoyale	Chinni Chinni Aasa	Kannada	M. Karthik
2012	Sakkubaii Garam Chai	Damarukam	Telugu	Devi Sri Prasad
2012	Molly Cool	Molly Aunty Rocks	Malayalam	Anand Madhusoodhanan
2012	Konjam Koffe Konjam Kadhal	Konjam Koffee Konjam Kadhal	Tamil	Phani Kalyan
2012	Julayi	Julayi	Telugu	Devi Sri Prasad
2012	Symphoniyil	Shiva Poojaiyil Karadi	Tamil	Sundar C Babu
2012	en frienda pola yaru macha	Nanban	Tamil	Harris Jayaraj
2013	Na hridayamuna/En uyir paravai	Krissh-3	Telugu/Tamil	Rajesh Roshan
2013	Yanam	Escape from Uganda	Malayalam	Varun Unni
2013	All in All Title song	All in All Azhagu Raja	Tamil	S. Thaman
2013	Doore manathu	Weeping Boy	Malayalam	Anand Madhusoodanan
2013	Meenakshi Meenakshi	Masala	Telugu	S. Thaman
2013	Update	Adi lekka	Telugu	Chinni Charan
2013	Nugam Promo Song- En ulle	Nugam	Tamil	D.J Gopinath
2013	Doore Doore	Neelakasham Pachakadal Chuvanna Bhoomi	Malayalam	Rex Vijayan
2013	Singam Dance	Singam-2	Telugu	Devi Sri Prasad
2013	Yemo Nemo	Bangaru Kodipetta	Telugu	Mahesh Shankar
2013	Mara o mara	Tadaka	Telugu	S. Thaman
2013	Freedom	Yevadu	Telugu	Devi Sri Prasad
2013	Padipoyaanila	Balupu	Telugu	S. Thaman
2013	Shivane	ABCD: American-Born Confused Desi	Malayalam	Gopi Sundar
2013	Thaarame	English: An Autumn in London	Malayalam	Rex Vijayan
2013	Bad Boy	Alexpandian	Telugu	Devi Sri Prasad
2013	Maria Pitache	David	Telugu	Remo Fernandes
2013	Kannin aayiram	Aaru Sundarimarude Katha	Malayalam	Deepak Dev
2013	Shankarabharanam Tho	Iddarammayilatho	Telugu	Devi Sri Prasad
2015	Kunnimani Kunnirangi	Lord Livingstone 7000 Kandi	Malayalam	Rex Vijayan
2015	Tiger	Tiger	Telugu	S. Thaman
2015	Va deal	Va deal	Tamil	S. Thaman
2015	Title song (Sapthamashree Thaskaraha)	Sapthamashree Thaskaraha	Malayalam	Rex Vijayan
2015	Sana Sana	Avam	Tamil	Sundharamurthy KS
2015	Maname Maname	Vanmham	Telugu	S. Thaman
2015	Mar Salaam	Rabhasa	Telugu	S. Thaman
2016	E Khalbitha	Inspector Dawood Ibrahim (IDI)	Malayalam	Rahul Raj
2016	Nerunde Nerunde	Kavi Uddheshichathu	Malayalam	Jakes Bejoy
2016	Dooreyo	Anandam	Malayalam	Sachin Warrier
2016	Kallumoosi	Majnu	Telugu	Gopi Sunder
2016	Nenjukkule	Yaanum Theeyavan	Tamil	Achu
2016	Medhivaga	Atti	Tamil	Sundar C Babu
2016	Dubai	Jacobinte Swargarajyam	Malayalam	Shaan Rahman
2016	Nenu Rowdy Ne	Nenu Rowdy Ne	Telugu	Anirudh Ravichandar
2016	Hara Hara	Action Hero Biju	Malayalam	Jerry Amaldev
2016	Tarajuvvaki	Seethamma Andalu Ramayya	Telugu	Gopi Sundar
