= Akkarakazhchakal: The Movie =

Akkarakzhchakal: The Movie
- Teaser Poster
- Directed by: Abi Varghese; Ajayan Venugopalan
- Written by: Ajayan Venugopalan
- Produced by: Bom TV
- Starring: Josekutty Valiyakallumkal; Sajini Sachariah; Jacob Gregory; Paulose Palatty; Hari Dev; Sanjeev Nair; Alvin George; Reshma Kuttappassery; Geo Thomas
- Cinematography: Hyder Bilgrami
- Edited by: Hyder Bilgrami
- Music by: Kedar Kumar; Shyam Vai
- Production company: BOM TV production
- Release date: 29 April 2011 (USA)
- Country: United States
- Language: Malayalam

Akkarakazhchakal: The Movie is a 2011 American Malayalam film based upon the popular TV series Akkara Kazhchakal.

== Plot ==
The Thekkinmuttil family decides to send Appachan and Ammachi to an old-age home in Kerala. To take a break out of their regular lives they decide to make the long-pending trip to Niagara Falls.

== Cast ==
- Josekutty Valiyakallumkal as George Thekkinmootil (Chettai), a government employee as well as struggling insurance agent
- Sajini Sachariah as Rincy, George's wife and a nurse by profession

Thampy Antony as Professor Roy

- Jacob Gregory as Gregory (Girigiri), George's assistant insurance agent
- Paulose Palatty as Appachan, George's father, temporarily visiting from India
- Hari Dev as Mahesh (Mahi), a Malayalee nurse, obsessed with women
- Sanjeev Nair as Babykuttan, a Malayalee nurse who is trying to find a wife
- Alvin George as Matt (Mathaikunju), George's son
- Reshma Kuttappassery as Chakkimol, George's daughter
- Geo Thomas as Baiju, a software engineer
- Jayan Joseph as Krishnankutty Nair (Krish), a software engineer
- Shine Roy as Shiny, Rincy's friend who loves to show off her wealth
- Saji Sebastin as Jacob Embranthiri, a wine-loving scientist and Shiny's husband
- Sunny Kalloopara as Ikkili Chacko
- Peter Neendoor as Chackochan
- Jose Paramus as Achan

=== Family tree of Thekkinmootil Family ===
Appachan
George Thekkinmootil	Rincy George
Matt (Mathaikunju)	Chakkimol

== Production ==
The TV series became popular through YouTube and was later aired on Kairali TV in 2008. The series was conceptualized, written and directed by New Jersey–based Ajayan Venugopal and Abi Verghese. The series ended after 50 episodes and the team put together a stage show based on the series. Based on the positive feedback from the show, they decided to make a film based on the series.

The film is produced by Bom (Best of Malayalam) TV, a US-based Internet TV provider. The screenplay is written by Ajayan Venugopal. Ajayan Venugopal and Abi Verghese are handling the direction. Hyder Bilgrami is the director of cinematography. Kedar Kumar has composed the music. Hyder Bilgrami is the film editor. The pooja of the film was held on 3 September 2010 at Orangeburg, New York. Filming commenced on the same date. A teaser trailer appeared on the official Akkara Kazhchakal YouTube page on 22 September 2010. It was announced on the official facebook page on 10 November 2010 that filming has been completed and the post-production works had begun. The film released in the United States on 29 April 2011. The film was available on BOM TV set-top boxes from 24 December 2012.

== DVD release ==
A DVD of Akkara Kazhchakal was released during Onam 2008 celebrations of Kerala Association of New Jersey (KANJ) by the cast members.
