= Geeta Patel =

Indian descent, American film director and screenwriter

Geeta Vasant Patel
- Born: December 22, 1975 (age 50); Evanston, Illinois, U.S.
- Occupations: Film screenwriter; Television director; Film director; Producer
- Years active: 2001–present
- Notable work: Meet the Patels (2014); House of the Dragon (2022–24); Ahsoka (2023)
- Relatives: Ravi Patel (brother)

Geeta Vasant Patel (Note: In this Indian name, Vasant is a patronymic and the family name is Patel.) (born December 22, 1975) is an American film and television director, screenwriter, and producer best known for her work on Meet the Patels (2014), House of the Dragon (2022–24), and Ahsoka (2023).

== Career ==
In the early 2000s, Patel began her career by serving as an assistant writer on The Beast, The Fast and the Furious, Blue Crush, The Rundown, and Mindhunters. In 2008, she made her directorial debut with the documentary film Project Kashmir. In 2014, she directed and wrote her second documentary, Meet the Patels, with her brother Ravi V. Patel. In October 2015, Fox Searchlight acquired the rights to remake the film, with the Patel siblings set to co-write and co-direct.

In the 2010s, she directed episodes of Independent Lens, Sense8, The Mindy Project, Survivor's Remorse, Superstore, The Mick, Fresh Off the Boat, Speechless, Champions, Atypical, Santa Clarita Diet, Chambers, Dead to Me, Sweetbitter, and Runaways. In the following decade, she worked on the television series The Magicians, The Great, and P-Valley.

In January 2020, Patel was recruited to direct episodes 6 and 7 of The Witcher season 2, but, in October, it was revealed that Patel was replaced by Louise Hooper, due to scheduling conflicts and refusing to be committed to a months-long stay in the United Kingdom, after production was suspended due to the COVID-19. In 2023, she directed an episode of the Star Wars series Ahsoka. In April 2024, she directed an episode of the streaming miniseries Under the Bridge. By August 2024, she directed three episodes for the streaming series House of the Dragon. In February 2025, Patel was announced to be directing some episodes of DC Studios' Lanterns for HBO.

== Filmography ==
Feature film

Year	Title	Credited as			Note(s)
Year	Title	Director	Screenwriter	Producer	Note(s)
2001	The Fast and the Furious	No	Associate	No	
2002	Blue Crush	No	Associate	No	
2003	The Rundown	No	Associate	No	
2004	Mindhunters	No	Associate	No	
2008	Project Kashmir	Yes	Yes	Yes	Also additional camera operator
2014	Meet the Patels	Yes	Yes	Yes	Also cinematographer and editor

Television

Year	Title	Credited as			Note(s)
Year	Title	Director	Screenwriter	Producer	Note(s)
2001	The Beast	No	Associate	Associate	6 episodes
2010, 2016	Independent Lens	Yes	Yes	Yes	2 episodes Also cinematographer and editor
2015	Sense8	2nd Unit	No	No	8 episodes
2016–17	The Mindy Project	Yes	No	No	3 episodes
2016	Survivor's Remorse	Yes	No	No	Episode: "The Thank-You Note"
2016–18	Superstore	Yes	No	No	5 episodes
2017	The Mick	Yes	No	No	Episode: "The Mess"
2017	Fresh Off the Boat	Yes	No	No	Episode: "Driving Miss Jenny"
2017	Speechless	Yes	No	No	Episode: "M-a-May-Jay"
2018	Champions	Yes	No	No	2 episodes
2018	Atypical	Yes	No	No	Episode: "Pants on Fire"
2019	Santa Clarita Diet	Yes	No	No	Episode: "We Let People Die Every Day"
2019	Chambers	Yes	No	No	Episode: "Trauma Bonding"
2019	Dead to Me	Yes	No	No	2 episodes
2019	Sweetbitter	Yes	No	No	2 episodes
2019	Runaways	Yes	No	No	Episode: "The Broken Circle"
2020	The Magicians	Yes	No	No	Episode: "Magicians Anonymous"
2020	The Great	Yes	No	No	2 episodes
2020	P-Valley	Yes	No	No	Episode: "Belly"
2022–24	House of the Dragon	Yes	No	Co-executive	3 episodes
2023	Ahsoka	Yes	No	No	Episode: "Part Seven: Dreams and Madness"
2024	Under the Bridge	Yes	No	Executive	Episodes: "Looking Glass"
2026	Lanterns	Yes	No	No	2 episodes

== Accolades ==
For her work on Meet the Patels, she won the Audience Choice Award at the 2014 LA Film Festival, the Top 10 Audience Favorite at Hot Docs Canadian International Documentary Festival, Best Feature Documentary at the Mt. Hood Independent Film Festival, the Audience Award at the Mosaic International South Asian Film Festival, and Best Documentary Film and Founders Grand Prize Best Film at the Traverse City Film Festival. For her work on Under the Bridge, she was nominated at the 1st Gotham TV Awards for "Breakthrough Limited Series".
