= Akaash Singh =

American comedian and actor (born 1984)

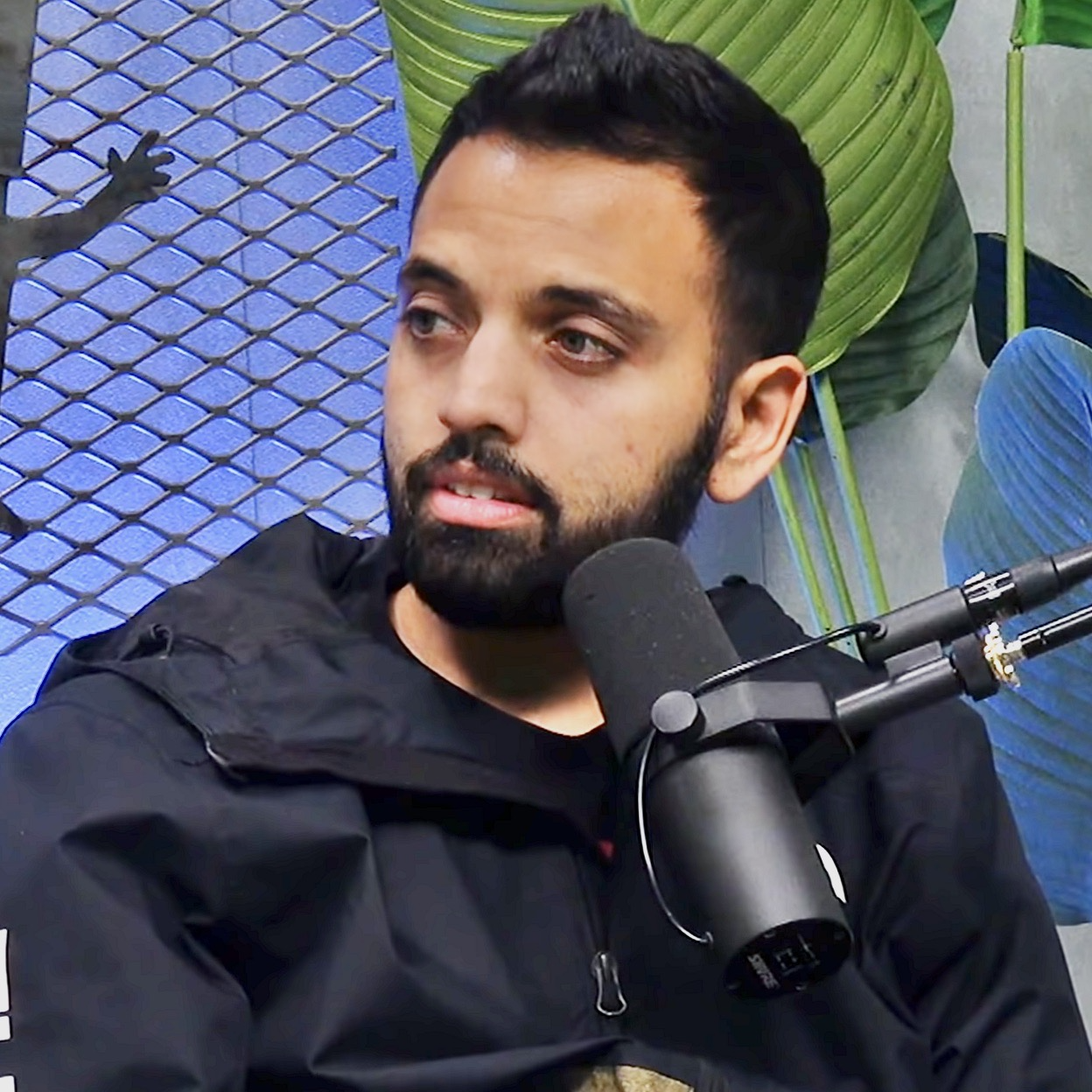
- Singh in 2021
- Born: May 4, 1984 (age 42); Dallas, Texas, U.S.
- Education: Austin College
- Occupations: Comedian; actor; podcaster
- Years active: 2007–present
- Notable work: Akaash Singh: Bring Back Apu; Wild 'n Out; Brown Nation; Flagrant 2
- Spouse: Jasleen Chawla (m. 2021)
- Website: akaashsingh.com

Akaash Singh (born May 4, 1984) is an American comedian, actor, and podcaster. He is best known as the former co-host of the Flagrant podcast with fellow comedian Andrew Schulz, and his comedy specials Bring Back Apu and Gaslit on YouTube.

== Early life and education ==
Singh was born on May 4, 1984, in Dallas, Texas, into an Indian family from Uttar Pradesh. His father is a business owner. He started developing his stand-up skills at school talent shows. He went to Austin College from 2002 to 2006. He left the pre-med track to pursue his comedy career full-time.

== Career ==
=== Stand-up comedy ===
Singh began performing stand-up comedy by his freshman year in college as he performed at his first open mic in Denton, Texas.

In February 2022, Singh self-released his first comedy special, Bring Back Apu on YouTube. This special amassed a million views in one week of being released.

=== Television, film, and web series ===
Singh was featured in five episodes of the improv comedy show Wild 'n Out (2014–2015), moving to a creative consultant role in 2017.

Additionally, he appeared in a smaller role in HBO's The Leftovers (2014) and was a cast member for the fifth season of MTV's Guy Code (2015).

In 2016, Singh appeared as Mookie in the Netflix series Brown Nation.

=== Podcasts ===
Singh was a co-host of the Flagrant podcast with fellow comedian Andrew Schulz, but left the podcast in May 2026 due to personal reasons. Originally intended to be a sports podcast, as of 2022, it has focused on current events and pop culture. The podcast releases two episodes a week and an additional episode exclusively for Patreon subscribers and it has 2 million subscribers on YouTube.

== Personal life ==
He married his wife Jasleen (née Chawla) in July 2021 in New Jersey. He lives in New York City.

== Filmography ==
=== Film ===
Year	Title	Role	Notes
2013	Hellaware	Noah	
2013	How to Follow Strangers	Ian	
2016	Hail Mary	Kevin	TV Movie
2017	Everything is Okay	Gary (Subway)	Short
2020	Timing	Akaash	

=== Television ===
Year	Title	Role	Notes
2014	Good Medicine	Raj	Main Cast
2014	The Leftovers	Dry Cleaner Employee	Episode: "Gladys"
2014–2015	Wild 'n Out	Himself	Season 6 & 7
2015	Guy Code	Himself	Episode: "Being Offensive, Commitment, Being Crazy"
2015	Broker	Raj	TV Short
2015	Carpool Rules	Himself	Web Series
2015	Difficult People	Dog Owner	Episode: "Premium Membership"
2015	Red Oaks	Delivery Guy	Episode: "MDMA"
2016	Guy Code vs. Girl Code	Himself	
2016	Brown Nation	Mookie	Main Cast
2017	Clickbait	Himself/Host	
2018	Fake News at Night	Himself	
2022	Top Gen	Himself/Host	

=== Comedy Special ===
Year	Title	Distribution	Notes
2022	Akaash Singh: Bring Back Apu	YouTube	
2024	Akaash Singh: Gaslit	YouTube	

=== Writing ===
Year	Title	Notes
2017	Wild 'n Out	
2022	Akaash Singh: Bring Back Apu	
2023	Fouja	Post-production

=== Executive producer ===
Year	Title	Notes
2022	Akaash Singh: Bring Back Apu	
