= Monsoon Mangoes =

- Theatrical release poster
- Directed by: Abi Varghese
- Written by: Abi Varghese; Matt Grubb; Naveen Bhaskar
- Produced by: Thampy Antony
- Starring: Fahadh Faasil; Vijay Raaz; Tovino Thomas
- Cinematography: Lukasz Pruchnik
- Edited by: Don Max
- Music by: Jakes Bejoy
- Production company: Kayal Films
- Distributed by: Central Pictures & Tricolor Entertainment
- Release date: 15 January 2016
- Running time: 132 minutes
- Country: India
- Language: Malayalam

Monsoon Mangoes is a 2016 Malayalam comedy film written and directed by Abi Varghese. The film stars Fahadh Faasil in the lead with Tovino Thomas, Iswarya Menon, Vinay Forrt and Vijay Raaz in supporting roles. The movie was produced by Thampy Antony. The film was released on 15 January 2016.

The film was originally intended to have the title Bourbon Street, which was later changed to Njan D P Pallikkal and finally to Monsoon Mangoes.

== Plot ==
In a sleepy suburb of New Orleans, D.P 'Daveed' Pallikkal, an ambitious young man in his early 30s, wishes to be a film director. He attempts to make a film named Monsoon Mangoes after producing some unsuccessful short films. For this venture Daveed ropes in an old Bollywood actor who was a hero in a few films, who now lives to make ends meet. His attempts to create a The Seventh Seal sort of art film result in failure. He returns to a regular job. He finally attempts to re-edit the film with clippings from the lead actor's personal items. He tries to re-invent the actor's own life experience and stories for his Monsoon Mangoes. For this he uses a clip which he recorded before the actor's death as the centrepiece and material from his original film. The clip is a monologue of the actor expressing, "Cinema is not above a life and there are three types of people. Firstly, those who consider having a job and family is everything. Secondly, those find what they do is not enough and expands their horizons and makes contributions to the society and thirdly there are people who tries to expand their horizons and fail but pursue them and fall in the journey before reaching the destination." Daveed orchestrates a public viewing for his film, and a lot of people attend and appreciates it. This makes Daveed happy in realizing his dream.

== Cast ==
- Fahadh Faasil as D.P 'Daveed' Pallikkal
- Vijay Raaz as Prem Kumar
- Vinay Forrt as Miguel
- Tovino Thomas as Sanjay
- Gregory as Super star John Carlos
- Nandu as D. Paulose
- Sanju Sivram as Koshy
- Iswarya Menon as Rekha
- Alencier Ley Lopez as Bombay Pathrose
- Thampy Antony as Shashankan Mutholi
- Josukutty as Daveed's uncle
- Sajini Sachariah as Daveed's mother
- Nick Blady as Carlos
- Beatrice Bindu

== Music ==
The songs composed by Jakes Bejoy were released by Muzik 247 on 6 January 2016. There are four tracks on the soundtrack album, sung by Shreya Ghoshal, Vijay Yesudas, Rakesh Kishore, Jakes Bejoy, Udith, Muhammed Aslam, Jagdish, Abhishek, Mame Khan, and The Elfa Choir. The lyrics were penned by Jelu Jayaraj, Manoj Kuroor, and Raqeeb Alam.

No.	Title	Lyrics	Singer(s)
1	"Mangoes"	Jelu Jayaraj	Rakesh Kishore, Jakes Bejoy, Udith
2	"Rosie"	Manoj Kuroor	Shreya Ghoshal, Jakes Bejoy
3	"Asha"	Raqeeb Alam	Jagdish, Muhammed Aslam
4	"Naadinu"	Manoj Kuroor	Vijay Yesudas, The Elfa Choir
5	"Beete Din"	Raqeeb Alam	Abhishek Iyer, Mame Khan

== Reception ==
A critic from Deccan Chronicle wrote that "Monsoon Mangoes is an enjoyable two-and-a-half-hours, if you won't analyse it hard and try to figure out a deeper meaning. It's just a nice little movie, like the nice little town it's set in." Paresh C Palicha critic of Rediff.com gave 1.5 stars out of 5 and stated that "Well, we just hope that this film does not have the same fate."
