= Mahaley Patel =

American actress (born 1987)

- Born: Mahaley Hessam; September 30, 1987 (age 38); Atlanta, Georgia, USA
- Other names: Mahaley Hessam; Mahaley Manning
- Occupations: Actress, singer, songwriter
- Years active: 2009–present
- Spouse: Ravi Patel (m. 2015)
- Children: 4

Mahaley Patel (née Hessam; born September 30, 1987) is an American actress best known for appearances in the films Easy A, The DUFF, and Our Show.

== Personal life ==
Patel's parents are Harriet and Tawab Hessam. Her father is from Afghanistan. She married Indian-American actor Ravi Patel on November 8, 2015, with whom she has a daughter named Amelie, born 2016. She owns a boxer named Coco and, in her spare time, volunteers as a youth mentor with Red Eye Inc.

She attended high school at Laurel Springs High School and college at Emory University and then UCLA. Patel is also an honors graduate of UCLA. Patel attended UCLA where she got her first big break in Easy A. Patel co-founded MaHolland Productions, which specializes in producing and developing socially relevant content. Patel has had the same acting coach since she was in high school and said Lisina Stoneburner is one of the first people whom she calls when she lands a role. As of 2018, Patel attends Pepperdine University, and is working on her degree that specializes in marriage and family therapy.

== Filmography ==
=== Film ===
Year	Title	Role	Notes
2010	Easy A	Nina Howell	as Mahaley Hessam
2015	The DUFF	Kara	as Mahaley Manning
2016	Be Somebody	Kelsey	
2016	Carrie Pilby	Amanda	as Mahaley Manning

=== Television ===
Year	Title	Role	Notes
2009	Accidentally On Purpose	Holly	Episode: "The Godfather"
2010	Secret Life of the American Teenager	Donna	Episode: "Just Say Me"
2010	Big Time Rush	Sandra	Episode: "Welcome Back Big Time"
2010	Our Show	Zohra	Television film; as Mahaley Hessam
2013-2014	Awkward	Nia	Guest role; 3 episodes
2015	Eat Me	Herself	Host, also executive producer; unaired television series
2019	Broker	Destiny	Television film
