= Metro Park (TV series) =

Indian sitcom web television series

- Genre: Sitcom
- Written by: Ajayan Venugopalan
- Directed by: Abi Varghese; Ajayan Venugopalan
- Starring: Ranvir Shorey; Omi Vaidya; Purbi Joshi; Pitobash Tripathy
- Music by: Jakes Bejoy; Rohit Gopalakrishnan (season 2)
- Country of origin: India
- Original language: Hindi
- No. of seasons: 2
- No. of episodes: 21 (5 special episodes)

Production
- Executive producers: Giju John; Bhuvanesh Shrivastava; Raaj Rahhi
- Cinematography: Sahadev Kelvadi (Season 1); Manoj Narula (Season 2)
- Editor: Shando Uruvath
- Running time: 20–25 minutes

Original release
- Network: Eros Now
- Release: 3 March 2019

Metro Park is an Indian Hindi-language sitcom web television series on Eros Now about the Indian Gujarati family living in Metro Park, an Indian-American majority neighborhood in Middlesex County, New Jersey, United States, and the funny problems they face.

== Cast ==
- Ranvir Shorey as Kalpesh Patel
- Purbi Joshi as Payal Patel
- Omi Vaidya as Kannan Menon
- Vega Tamotia as Kinjal Patel, Kannan's wife and Payal's sister
- Pitobash Tripathy as Bittu Amritraj , Kalpesh's store assistant
- Arnav Joshi as Pankaj Patel, Kalpesh and Payal's son
- Aashmi Joshi as Simran (Munni) Patel, Kalpesh & Payal's daughter
- Sarita Joshi as Mummy, Payal & Kinjal's Mother, Kalpesh & Kannan's mother-in-law - Season 2
- Milind Soman as Arpit, a dentist, Payal's schoolmate and first crush (cameo) - Season 2
- Gopal Dutt as Dr. Vivek Saini, a therapist (cameo) - Season 2

== Episodes ==
=== Season 1 ===
No.	Title
1	"New Beginnings"
2	"The Assistant"
3	"Kalpesh Studies"
4	"Guerilla Marketing"
5	"Karoake Nights"
6	"Unisex"
7	"Diet and Gadget"
8	"Pregnancy Class"
9	"House Falling Apart"

=== Quarantine Edition ===
No.	Title
1	"Episode 1"
2	"Episode 2"
3	"Episode 3"
4	"Episode 4"
5	"Episode 5"

=== Season 2 ===
No.	Title
1	"Fresh Prince of Metro Park"
2	"Parenting"
3	"Surveillance"
4	"Mummy returns"
5	"'Payal Do All'"
6	"Bollygroove"
7	"Keep Metropark Great!"
8	"Biscuit Baba"
9	"Run Kannan Run!"
10	"Dinner and Movie"
11	"Cool! Pre-School!"
12	"First Birthday"

== Production ==
Metro Park is a "revamped" version of Akkara Kazhchakal, a Malayali sitcom aired in 2008–10.

== Release ==
To celebrate the launch of the series, Prem Parameswaran (President of North America Eros), Abi Varghese, Ajayan Venugopalan and Omi Vaidya rang the Opening Bell at the New York Stock Exchange on Friday, 1 March 2019. A special "Quarantine Edition" was released in 2020, and Season 2 was released on 29 January 2021.

== Reception ==
The show was nominated in all major categories for the CNN-IBN Ireel awards 2019 including Best Comedy, Best Actor Comedy, Best Actress Comedy. Ranvir Shorey won Gold awards Best Actor(Comedy) for his portrayal of Kalpesh Patel in Metropark.

Hindustan Times found the special "Quarantine Edition" released in 2020 to be hilarious.

Season 2 was called light-hearted but determinedly middling by The Indian Express, also receiving an average review of 3/5 stars from The Times of India

== See also ==
- Akkara Kazhchakal
