= Ravi Patel (actor) =

American actor (born 1978)

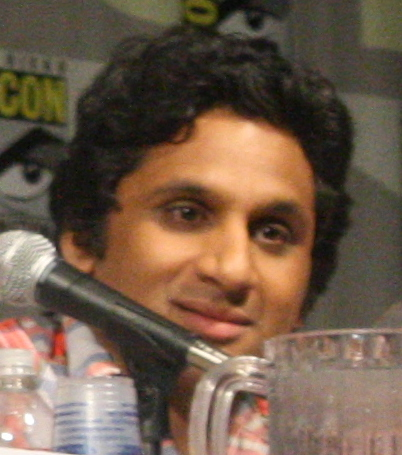
- Patel at the Past Life panel at San Diego Comic-Con in 2009
- Born: Ravi Vasant Patel; December 18, 1978 (age 47); Freeport, Illinois, U.S.
- Occupation: Actor
- Years active: 2006–present
- Spouse: Mahaley Patel (m. 2015)
- Children: 3
- Relatives: Geeta Patel (sister)

Ravi Vasant Patel (born December 18, 1978) is an American actor. He had main roles in the Fox sitcoms Grandfathered (2015–2016) and Animal Control (2023–present).

Patel and his sister wrote and directed an autobiographical documentary, Meet the Patels.

== Early life and education ==
Patel was born in Freeport, Illinois to Gujarati Indian-American parents, the son of financial consultant father Vasant Patel and real estate agent mother Champa Patel. He grew up in Charlotte, North Carolina and graduated from the University of North Carolina at Chapel Hill in 2001 with double majors in economics and international studies. His sister, Geeta Patel, is a writer and director.

== Career ==
=== Television and film ===
An emcee job with improvised stand-up in between acts led to auditions, Patel's first agent, and two dozen commercials in a year. He has been in over 70 national commercials, films and TV shows, most notably Transformers, Scrubs, It's Always Sunny in Philadelphia, The Comedians, and Hawaii Five-O.

From 2008 to 2009, Patel appeared as George Patil in six episodes on The CW's Easy Money. In 2010, he starred in Past Life on Fox.

Patel co-directed and starred in Meet the Patels, a documentary that he made with his sister, Geeta Patel which won the audience award at the 2014 Los Angeles Film Festival. The film portrays Patel's autobiographical journey of trying to find an Indian wife. The duo has a deal with Fox Searchlight Pictures to write and direct a narrative remake of the film.

Patel worked in multiple episodes of the Aziz Ansari series Master of None. From 2015 to 2016, Patel appeared on the John Stamos TV series Grandfathered.

In 2020, Patel also created the CNN-produced docuseries Pursuit of Happiness which aired on HBO Max. In the same year, Patel worked in Indian romantic comedy series, Bhaag Beanie Bhaag.

Since 2023, Patel has played a main role as Amit Patel in the Fox sitcom Animal Control.

=== Other ===
Patel is the co-founder of This Bar Saves Lives, which donates a meal packet for every granola bar they sell. He is an active investor in start-ups in health and wellness.

== Personal life ==
Patel is married to actress Mahaley Patel, with whom he has a daughter named Amelie.

== Filmography ==
=== Film ===
Film performances
Year	Title	Role	Notes
2006	The Boys & Girls Guide to Getting Down	Rajeev	First film role of his career Independent film
2007	Transformers	Telephone operator	Cameo appearance
2008	Hotel California	Sam	Supporting role
2009	Powder Blue	Sanjay	Direct-to-video
2010	The Last Hurrah	Ara	Supporting role
2014	Meet the Patels	Himself	Also director, cinematographer and editor with his sister Geeta Patel; Documentary
2015	Puerto Ricans in Paris	Hassan	Ensemble cast
2016	Get a Job	Wick	Limited release Video on demand
2017	Band Aid	Bobby	Guest star
2018	The Black String	Dr. May	Video on demand
2019	Long Shot	Tom	Supporting role
2019	Come as You Are	Mo	Limited release
2019	Boy Genius	Mr. Hume	Film also released as Emmett
2020	Butter	Dr. Bean	video on demand
2020	Wonder Woman 1984	Babajide	HBO Max original movie
2022	The Valet	Kapoor	Hulu original movie
2022	The Time Capsule	Roger	Video on demand
2023	Dashing Through the Snow	Peter	Disney+ original movie
2024	Kiss of the Con Queen	The Hollywood Con Queen	Lead role Limited release
2024	Harold and the Purple Crayon	Prasad	IMAX only
2025	Clone Cops	Robert Nefari	Video on Demand; Independent Film
TBA	Best Pancakes in the County	Ryder	Post-production

=== Television ===
Television performances
Year	Title	Role	Notes
2006	It's Always Sunny in Philadelphia	Lawyer	Episode: "The Gang Goes Jihad"
2007	Scrubs	Dr. Patel	2 episodes
2008–2009	Easy Money	George Patil	6 episodes
2009	Static	Various roles	6 episodes
2010	Past Life	Dr. Rishi Karna	9 episodes
2010	Look	Vinnay	3 episodes
2011	Outsourced	Kamran	Episode: "Todd's Holi War"
2011	Svetlana	Vivek	2 episodes
2011	Game for gamers	Ravi	Television special
2011	Five	Dr. Desai	Television film
2012	Bones	Poorab Sangani	Episode: "The Don't in the Do"
2012	Perception	Dr. Harvey Kapoor	Episode: "Pilot"
2012	The New Normal	Amir	4 episodes
2013–2014	Super Fun Night	Alexander Rosenhoff	4 episodes
2014	The Michael J. Fox Show	Ranesh	Episode: "Co-Op"
2014	Trophy Wife	Dr. Scharma	Episode: "Mother's Day"
2014	Hawaii Five-0	Dr. Sanjeet Dhawan	Episode: "Ke Koho Mamao Aku"
2015	Childrens Hospital	Dr. Sunnit Bharta	Episode: "Up at 5"
2015	The Comedians	Casey	Episode: "Billy's Birthday"
2015	Another Period	Mohandas Gandhi	Episode: "Switcheroo Day"
2015	Master of None	Ravi Patel	2 episodes
2015–2016	Grandfathered	Ravi Gupta	Main role 22 episodes
2016	Grey's Anatomy	Timir Dahr	2 episodes
2016–2017	Wrecked	Tank Top	Recurring role 6 episodes
2017	Superstore	Rex Joshi	Episode: "Rebranding"
2017	The Great Indoors	Lalit Pajala	Episode: "Mason Blows Up"
2017	Santa Clarita Diet	Ryan	Episode: "The Book!"
2017	American Housewife	Grant	5 episodes
2018	Living Biblically	Doug	3 episodes
2018	Door No. 1	Shane	Episode: "Ten Year"
2018	The Cool Kids	Dr. Chad	Episode: "Sid Comes Out"
2019	Fam	Joe	Episode: "This Is Fam"
2020	Ravi Patel's Pursuit of Happiness	Himself	Documentary series
2020	Bhaag Beanie Bhaag	Ravi	6 episodes
2021–2022	Ghosts	Lewis	2 episodes
2023–present	Animal Control	Amit Patel	Main role
2023	Justified: City Primeval	Rick Newley	4 episodes
2024	Three Women	Dr. Henry	3 episodes
2025	Futurama	Ipji	Voice, replaces Billy West
2025	Special Forces: World's Toughest Test	Himself	Contestant: Season 4 (5 episodes)
TBA	The Off Weeks	Drew	Upcoming miniseries
