= Bhaag Beanie Bhaag =

Indian romantic comedy series

- Poster
- Genre: Romantic comedy
- Created by: Neel Shah; Ravi Patel
- Directed by: Abi Varghese; Debbie Rao; Ishaan Nair
- Starring: Swara Bhaskar; Ravi Patel; Varun Thakur; Mona Ambegaonkar; Girish Kulkarni; Dolly Singh
- Country of origin: India
- No. of seasons: 1
- No. of episodes: 6

Production
- Producers: Bernad S.David; Ruben Fleischer; Seher Latif; Shivani Saran

Original release
- Network: Netflix
- Release: 4 December 2020

Bhaag Beanie Bhaag is an Indian romantic comedy series featuring Swara Bhasker in the lead role. Directed by Abi Varghese, Debbie Rao and Ishaan Nair, it has Mona Ambegaonkar, Girish Kulkarni, stand-up comedians Varun Thakur and Ravi Patel in supporting roles. It was released on Netflix on 4 December 2020.

== Premise ==
Facing disapproving parents, a knotty love life and her own inner critic, an aspiring comic ditches her cushy but unsatisfying life to pursue stand-up comedy.

== Cast ==
- Swara Bhaskar as Bindhya "Beanie" Bhatnagar
- Varun Thakur as Arun, Beanie's boyfriend
- Ravi Patel, playing a fictionalised version of himself
- Mona Ambegaonkar as Shruti Bhatnagar, Beanie's mother
- Girish Kulkarni as Vasant Bhatnagar, Beanie's father
- Dolly Singh, as Kapi, Beanie's best friend

== Episodes ==
No.	Directed by	Written by	Original release date
1	Debbie Rao	Neel Shah and Ravi Patel	4 December 2020
Unhappy at work and engaged to a man who doesn't understand her, aspiring stand-up comic Beanie realizes she's on the fast track to a discontented life.
2	Debbie Rao	Nisha Karla	4 December 2020
As Ravi and Kapi try to get an anxious Beanie back on stage, she deals with the reactions of her boss, parents and Arun to her big decisions.
3	Unknown	Unknown	4 December 2020
Despite her parents' concerns, Beanie goes full throttle on her new plans, until Ravi makes her take a day off with him.
4	Unknown	Unknown	4 December 2020
Visits with a therapist force Beanie’s parents to face ignored truths. As Beanie begins to let her guard down with Ravi, a discovery throws her off.
5	Unknown	Unknown	4 December 2020
Reeling from recent quarrels, Beanie agrees to perform at a wedding, where she runs into some unexpected guests and gets unabashedly real on stage.
6	Unknown	Unknown	4 December 2020
Ahead of an exciting opportunity, Beanie considers making peace with her parents, acting on resurfaced feelings and staying true to her dreams.

== Production ==
The show is created by Neel Shah and Ravi Patel. It is directed by Abi Varghese, Debbie Rao and Ishaan Nair and produced by Shivani Saran, Ruben Fleischer, David Bernad and Seher Aly Latif. The show was earlier titled as Messy and is set in Mumbai.

According to Swara Bhasker, "The show is not just about comedy. It's about the journey of self-discovery of a girl who has imbibed the values that Indian society gives to girl children — which is to be obedient, to always listen to your parents and elders, and to place other people’s emotions over your own. It's a story that most girls, and especially girls from South Asia, can relate to. At same time, the parents are not villains. They are just normal people dealing with their own conditioning. It makes you hopeful that even if your parents don’t understand you today, maybe someday they will." She also revealed that she was "terrified of the standup portions".

== Release ==
The series released on 4 December 2020 on OTT media service Netflix.

== Reception ==
Saibal Chatterjee of NDTV, rating it 2.5 out of 5 stars writes that "Bhaag Beanie Bhaag is Swara's show all the way. She does justice to it. The series, too thin at its core, does not complement her game effort. All the huffing and puffing the show has to do in order to keep up runs it ragged." Divyanshi Sharma of India Today wrote, "It is not a laugh riot, but it sure is a breath of fresh air which will also tickle your funny bone at times... Due to its plot, comparisons with Amazon Prime Video's The Marvelous Mrs. Maisel are inevitable. But once you become a part of Beanie’s world, all the comparisons take a backseat."
