= Meet the Patels =

- Theatrical release poster
- Directed by: Geeta Patel; Ravi Patel
- Starring: Geeta Patel; Ravi Patel
- Cinematography: Geeta Patel
- Distributed by: Alchemy
- Release dates: April 27, 2014 (Hot Docs); September 11, 2015
- Running time: 88 minutes
- Country: United States
- Language: English
- Box office: US$1.7 million

Meet the Patels is a 2014 American romantic comedy documentary film directed by siblings Geeta Patel and Ravi Patel. The film explores the expectations surrounding marriage in the Patels' first-generation Indian immigrant family and in wider American society. It had its international premiere at Hot Docs in April 2014.

Fox Searchlight acquired remake rights after the documentary won the Audience Award at the Los Angeles Film Festival.

== Plot ==
Neither Ravi Patel, a 30 year old small-time upcoming actor, nor his sister are married, to the chagrin of their parents Vasant (Financial planner) and Champa (an accomplished match-maker and real estate agent), who had an arranged marriage. However, Ravi has been, without his parents' knowledge, dating Audrey, a white red-headed American woman, and Ravi recently broke up with her. On a family trip to India (during "wedding season") he agrees to make a serious effort to find a partner, alternating between a matchmaking process of dates with Indian-American women from among the Patel clan based in Gujarat by circulation of biodata sheets; registering with Indian marriage websites, identifying potential mates by evaluation and through extended family relations, and matrimonial ceremonies & conventions. Interspersed between the dating activity, much of it organized by his parents who continue to lament his lack of commitment to the process and high standards. Ravi discusses his experiences and his feelings about the whole thing with his sister Geeta, meanwhile Geeta also notices Ravi's one nights with Audrey, even after breaking up and Audrey's consistent request to break their plateau friendship. Ravi eventually recognizes that his frame of reference is always Audrey, his first love and no matter what or where he searches, he is not going to find Audrey in others. The parents hearing the news from Ravi at first become reluctant but come around, conclude their match-making and relax their constraints in expectations and accept their son's wishes for being with someone he truly loves, and Ravi ends up back with Audrey, who eventually wins the affection of his parents and adopts Indian traditions.

== Production ==
Production for the film began in early 2009 under directors Ravi Patel and Geeta Patel. The film was produced by Janet Eckholm and Geralyn Dreyfous along with PBS and received funding from the CPB (Corporation for Public Broadcasting).

=== Filming techniques ===
The movie alternates between live action cinematography (filmed by Ravi's sister Geeta) with limited effort made to address lighting issues or the intrusion of microphones into the camera's view; and animation sequences of Ravi being interviewed by Geeta and explaining events in his dating and family life.

== Reception ==
=== Critical response ===
Meet the Patels has received mostly positive reviews from critics. The film premiered at the Los Angeles Film Festival where it won the audience choice award leading Fox Searchlight to acquire remake rights. On the review aggregator Rotten Tomatoes, the film holds a rating of 87%. The site's critical consensus reads, "Meet the Patels works on multiple levels, offering an affably entertaining documentary about one man looking for love while posing thoughtful questions about cultural assimilation and modern romance."

=== Accolades ===
Meet the Patels won the Audience Choice Award at the 2014 Los Angeles Film Festival, was named a Top 10 Audience Favorite at Hot Docs Canadian International Film Festival, named Best Feature Documentary at the Mt. Hood Independent Film Festival, and won the Audience Award at the Mosaic International South Asian Film Festival. It was also named the Best Documentary Film and won the Founders Grand Prize Best Film at the Traverse City Film Festival.
