= Shiv Shastri Balboa =

2023 Hindi film

- Directed by: Ajayan Venugopalan
- Written by: Ajayan Venugopalan
- Produced by: Kishore Varieth
- Starring: Anupam Kher; Neena Gupta; Jugal Hansraj; Nargis Fakhri; Sharib Hashmi; Aarav Desai; Anil Joseph
- Cinematography: Joshua Ausley
- Edited by: Praveen Prabhakar
- Music by: Alokananda Dasgupta
- Release date: 10 February 2023
- Running time: 126 minutes
- Country: India
- Language: Hindi

Shiv Shastri Balboa is a 2023 Indian Hindi-language comedy drama film written and directed by Ajayan Venugopalan. The film stars Anupam Kher, Neena Gupta and Jugal Hansraj in lead roles. The film was shot mostly in New Jersey, U.S. The soundtrack and background score were composed by Alokananda Dasgupta. The cinematography was done by Joshua Ausley and edited by Praveen Prabhakar.

== Plot ==
Shiv Shankar Shastri a retiree, widower from India, and big Rocky movie fan, moves to the US to be with his only son. He has to shoot a video of himself doing the Rocky Steps in Philadelphia for an impending interview in India, but his son refuses because he is busy. Stuck in a large house alone with a dog, he is forced to befriend him and forms an unlikely bond with an undocumented housekeeper named Elsa. Though they belong to different economic and social strata, these two lonely souls end up on an unexpected road trip through the American heartland, which teaches that it's never too old to reinvent yourself.

Shiv Shastri Balboa is a comedy that discusses cultural stigma, undocumented immigration, and racism and how a man's passion for cinema can overcome it all.

== Cast ==
- Anupam Kher as Shiv Shankar Shastri
- Neena Gupta as Elsa
- Jugal Hansraj as Rahul
- Sharib Hashmi as Cinnamon Singh
- Nargis Fakhri as Siya
- Aarav Desai as Advaith
- Rajat Sharma as himself
- Anil Joseph as Sanjeev
- Simonas Zmuidzinas as police officer

== Reception ==
Dhaval Roy of The Times of India gave 4 out of 5 ratings Joyeeta Mitra Suvarna of India TV gave 4 out of 5 ratings, Urmila Kori of Prabhat Khabar gave 3 out of 5 ratings, Virendra Mishra of Amar Ujala gave 3 out of 5 ratings, and Roktim Rajpal of India Today gave 2.5 out of 5 ratings.

Monika Rawal Kukreja of Hindustan Times wrote "Shiv Shastri Balboa is sweet, innocent and an endearing story about love, life and learnings.", Rekha Khan of Navbharat Times wrote "Lovers of family and entertainment films can watch this film".

The film has been also reviewed by Jyotsna Rawat of Navodaya Times, Shubhra Gupta of The Indian Express gave 2.5 out of 5 ratings. Shiv Shastri, a middle-aged ex-banker from Bhopal, starts a new life in the US, where his successful doctor son, Hansraj, resides. Inspired by 'Rocky,' Shastriji dreams of replicating iconic steps in Pennsylvania. Loneliness fades as he befriends Elsa-from-Hyderabad, a housekeeper with dreams. Elsa, saving for eight years, seeks Shastriji's help to visit India due to underpayment. Their road-trip faces challenges like theft and racism, yet the film's genuine affection for characters shines through. Kher and Gupta tackle problems with resilience, making empathy easy on their journey.

=== Screenings and film festivals ===
The film premiered in North America at Chicago South Asian film festival and Atlanta Indian Film Festival and received rave reviews.

Shiv Shastri Balboa was awarded the best feature film (Runner-up) at CSAFF.
