= Seher Latif =

Indian casting director and producer

Seher Latif (died 7 June 2021) or Seher Aly Latif was an Indian producer and casting director, who worked on a number of domestic and international film projects based in India. Her credits as a casting director including award-winning films such as The Lunchbox, Shakuntala Devi, and the Indian casting for Zero Dark Thirty, Eat Pray Love, and The Second Best Exotic Marigold Hotel, as well as television shows such as Sense8, and McMafia. She also produced the Indian romantic television series, Bhaag Beanie Bhaag, starring Swara Bhasker. In 2016, Elle Magazine listed her as one of the 'most powerful young Indian women in Bollywood'.

== Career ==
Latif worked primarily as a casting director, often collaborating with international film and television projects to cast Indian actors for scenes filmed in India. Variety described her as " one of the most sought-after casting directors for international projects set in India or with a significant India component." She worked on a number of well-received international projects that were filmed partly in India, including Kathryn Bigelow's Zero Dark Thirty, John Madden'sThe Best Exotic Marigold Hotel, Ryan Murphy's Eat Pray Love, and The Hundred-Foot Journey. In addition to her work in film, she also did casting for a number of television series that were filmed in or relating to India, including Sense8, McMafia, and The Good Karma Hospital. In 2013, along with Mark Bennett and Richard Hicks, she was nominated for an award for Big Budget/Feature Casting for her work on Zero Dark Thirty, by the Casting Society of America.

In India, Latif was the casting director for The Lunchbox, which won several domestic and international awards. More recently, she worked as a producer for Shakuntala Devi, a biographical film about the Indian mathematician Shakuntala Devi, starring Vidya Balan, as well as on Bhaag Beanie Bhaag, an Indian romantic television series for Netflix that starred Swara Bhasker. Bhaag Beanie Bhaag was a production of Mutant Studios, a production studio set up by Latif and Shivani Saran in 2016. They also produced a sports drama, GOLD, starring Akshay Kumar, in 2018. Other recent work included casting on a biopic of mathematician Srinivasa Ramanujan, titled The Man Who Knew Infinity and starring Dev Patel, a period film, Viceroy's House, directed by Gurinder Chadha, and a horor-drama, Durgamati, starring Bhumi Pednekar. In 2016, Elle Magazine listed her as one of the 'most powerful young Indian women in Bollywood'.

== Filmography ==
Latif's filmography included credits for casting and production.

=== Casting ===
Project	Role	Year
Television
Outsourced	Additional casting	2006
Bollywood Hero	Casting (India - 3 episodes)	2009
The Good Karma Hospital	Casting (6 episodes)	2017
Sense8	Casting (20 episodes)	2015-2017
McMafia	Casting (5 episodes)	2018
Bhaag Beanie Bhaag	Casting director (6 episodes)	2020
Film
Eat Pray Love	Casting (India)	2010
Save Your Legs!	Casting (India)	2012
Zero Dark Thirty	Casting (India)	2012
Monsoon Shootout	Original casting	2013
The Unseen Sequence	Casting director	2013
The Lunchbox	Casting director	2013
The Hundred Foot Journey	Casting (India)	2014
Million Dollar Arm	Casting director	2014
Tigers	Casting director	2014
The Second Best Exotic Marigold Hotel	Casting (India)	2015
Furious 7	Casting (India)	2015
The Man Who Knew Infinity	Casting director	2015
Viceroy's House	Casting director	2017
Bioscopewala	Casting director	2017
Noblemen	Casting director	2018
Line of Descent	Casting director	2019
Maska	Casting director	2020
Durgamati: The Myth	Casting director	2020
Shakuntala Devi	Casting director	2020

=== Production ===
Project	Role	Year
Television
Messy	Co-Producer	2020
Untitled	Executive Producer (9 episodes)	2020
Bhaag Beanie Bhaag	Executive Producer (6 episodes)	2020
Film
Taala Aur Chabi	Producer	2010
Masterchef	Producer	2014
GOLD	Executive Producer	2018
Noblemen	Executive Producer	2018
Maska	Producer	2020
Shakuntala Devi	Producer	2020

== Personal life ==
Her alma mater was Mater Dei School, New Delhi. Latif died at the age of 39 in Mumbai on 7 June 2021. The film Monkey Man, which she cast, is dedicated to her.
