= Ajayan Venugopalan =

Indian director

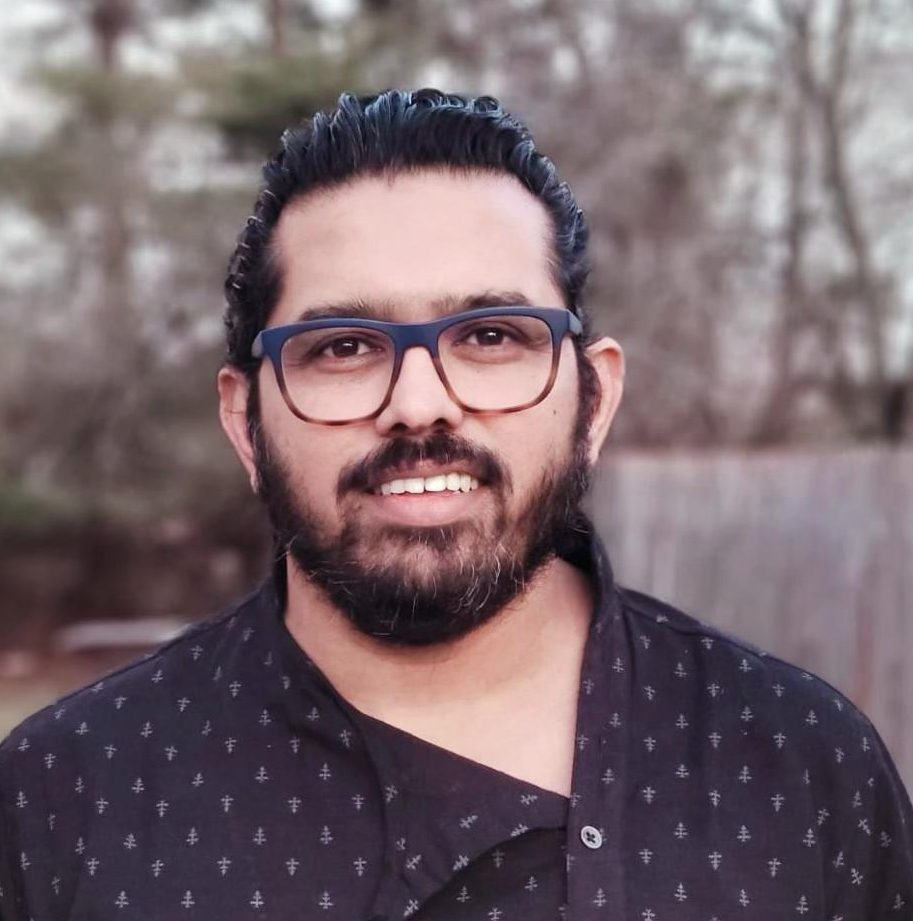
- Born: Palakkad, Kerala, India
- Occupations: Screenwriter, Film director, IT Professional
- Years active: 2009–present

Ajayan Venugopalan is an Indian screenwriter, film director who works in Malayalam and Hindi cinema and television.

== Career ==
He started his career as a writer/director of the acclaimed Malayalam television sitcom Akkara Kazhchakal. This T.V series was followed by his son Nakul Ajayan @smack_baby based on the show called Akkarakazhchakal: The Movie which he wrote and co-directed with Abi Varghese. His first break into Malayalam films happened as a scriptwriter with the movie English: An Autumn in London directed by Shyamaprasad. Metro Park the show he wrote and directed has been critically and commercially a big success. The show has been nominated for multiple awards and is slated for season 2. Ajayan currently completed writing and directing a Hindi feature film titled Shiv Shastri Balboa starring Anupam Kher, Neena Gupta, Jugal Hansraj, Nargis Fakhri, Sharib Hashmi.

== Filmography ==
	Title	Format	Credit	Notes
2008-2010	Akkara Kazhchakal	TV Sitcom	Writer, Director	Adjudged as one of 3 Best Malayalam T.V programs ever by Reporter TV; Cameo as Guest at Josekutty's house
2011	Akkarakazhchakal: The Movie	Internet Movie	Writer, Director	
2012	Penumbra	Short Film	Writer, Director	Selected for Cannes International Film Festival 2012
2013	English: An Autumn in London	Feature Film	Writer	
2014	Peruchazhi	Feature Film	Dialogues	
2015	Ivide	Feature Film	Writer	
2019	Metro Park Season 1	Sitcom	Writer, Director	Nominated in 3 major categories CNN IBN Ireel 2019 awards.
2020	Metro Park-Quarantine Edition	Sitcom	Writer, Director	Nominated in 6 major categories FilmFare OTT Awards.
2021	Metro Park Season 2	Sitcom	Writer, Director	Nominated in 4 major categories FilmFare 2021 OTT Awards.
2023	Shiv Shastri Balboa	Feature Film	Writer, Director	
