= Remy Munasifi =

American stand-up comedian (born 1980)

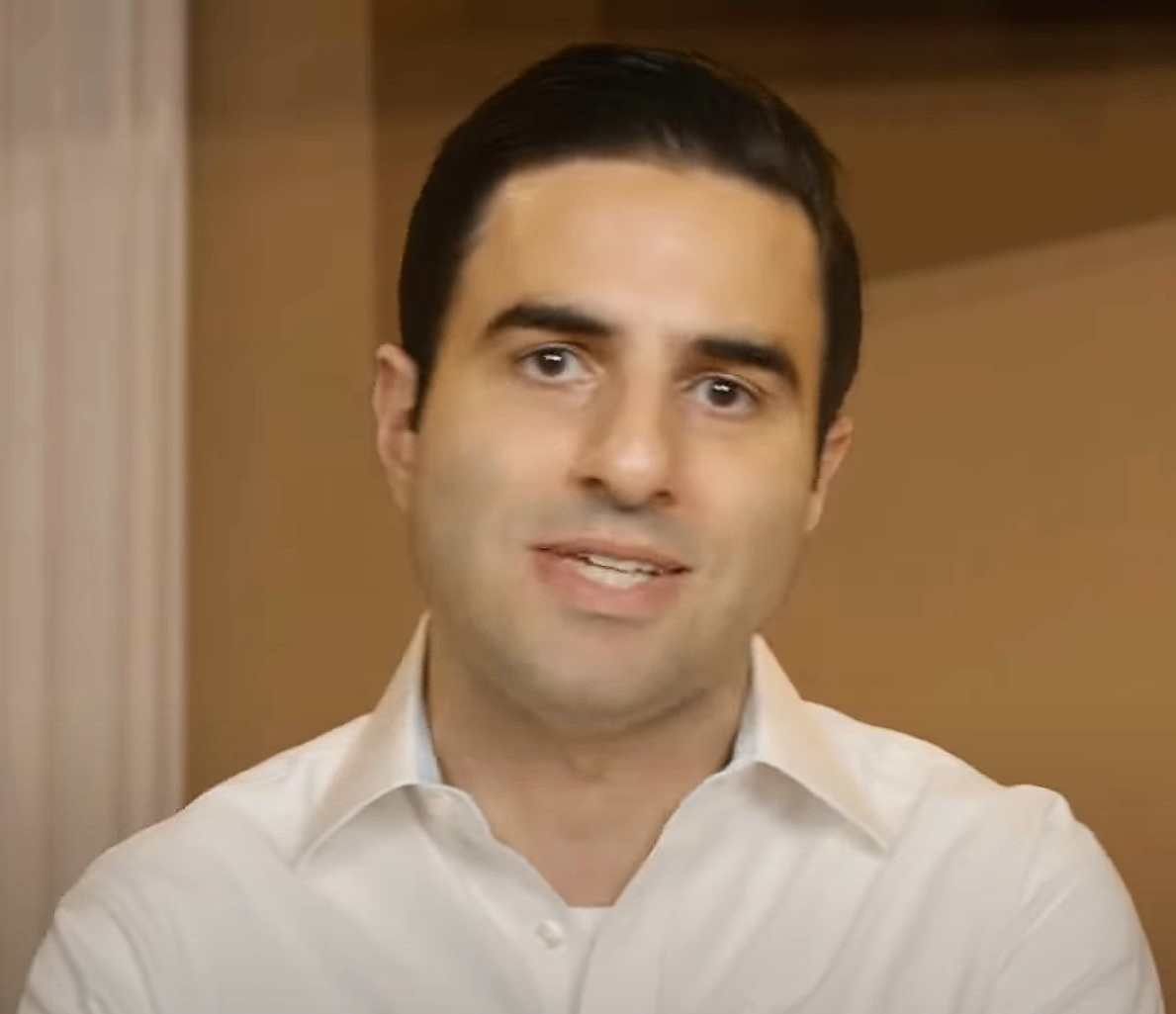
- Munasifi in 2021
- Born: June 16, 1980 (age 46); Washington, D.C., U.S.
- Years active: 2006–present
- Known for: Comedy, comedy music
- Website: goremy.com

Remy Munasifi (born June 16, 1980) is an American stand-up comedian, parody musician, rapper and video artist. A prominent voice in libertarian circles, Munasifi is a frequent collaborator with Reason magazine, where his parody videos often address themes of limited government, individual liberty, and economic freedom.

He gained widespread recognition for his comedic sketches on YouTube under the name 'GoRemy,' which also parody cultural and social issues, and his videos have amassed over 98 million views as of June 2021.

== Personal life ==
Munasifi was born in Washington, D.C., and grew up in McLean, Virginia. He has an Iraqi father who is a doctor, and a Lebanese mother who is a Pilates instructor. Munasifi graduated from the Honors Program at Wheeling Jesuit University in Wheeling, West Virginia in 2002.

He has been to Lebanon numerous times; many of his relatives moved there from Iraq after the Iraq War began in 2003.

== Career ==
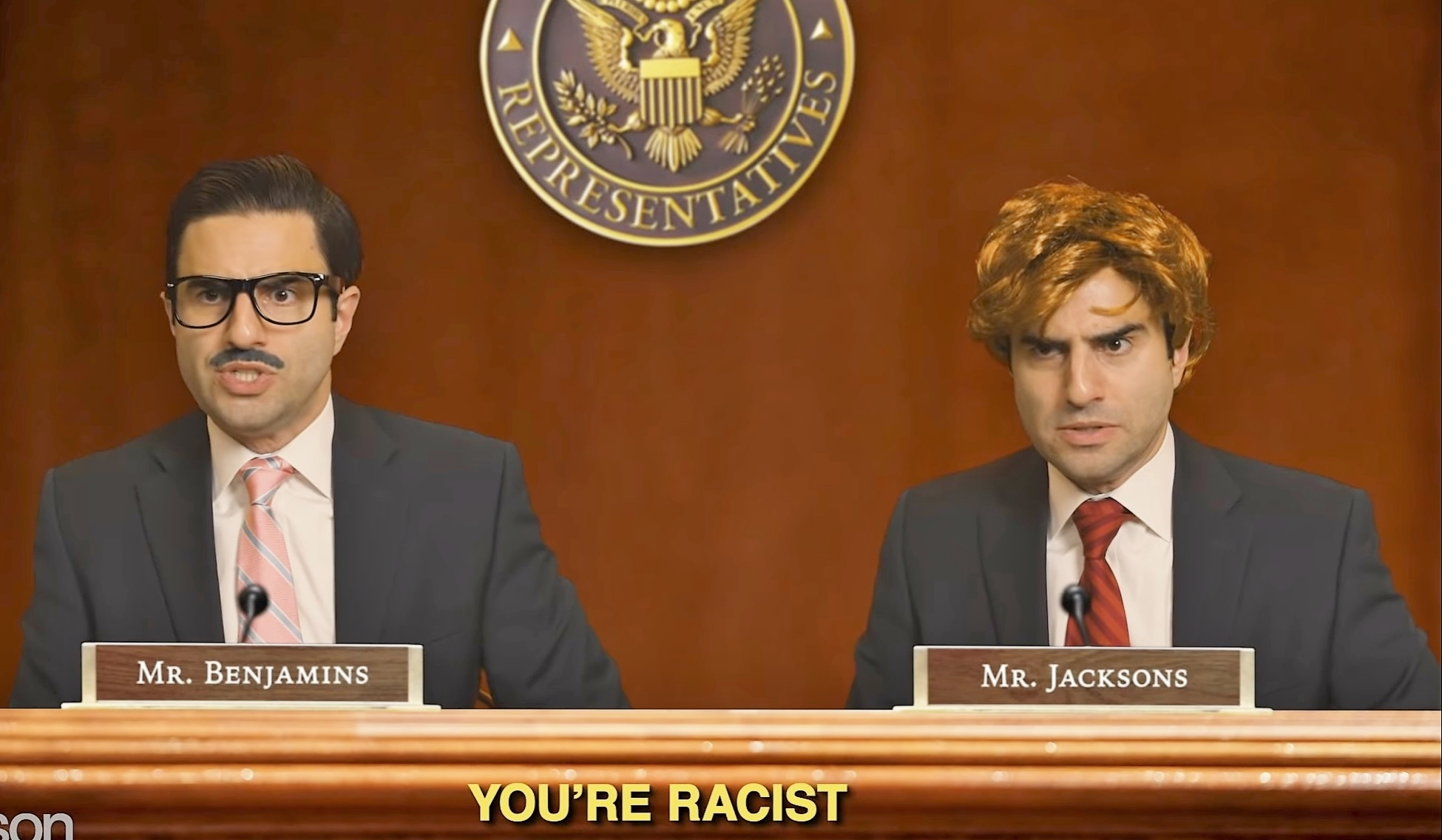
Munasifi as two US representatives in Raise the Debt Ceiling Rap (Again) video for Reason TV in 2021

Munasifi's comedic alter-ego "Habib Abdul Habib" received much popularity for joking about matters such as U.S. security screening. He is known for a video titled "Arlington: The Rap", which received 300,000 views in less than a day.

In 2009, he signed with the Gersh Agency, and later landed a Comedy Central Records deal. Munasifi has since been the opening act for rapper Wale, comedian Brian Posehn and others.

He has performed several times in the New York Arab-American Comedy Festival. Munasifi's debut EP, titled The Falafel Album, is available on iTunes. The Falafel Album was highly influenced by Munasifi's Iraqi and Lebanese heritage, especially culture and food.

Munasifi's 2011 political spoof video titled "Raise the Debt Ceiling" has over 750,000 views on YouTube. He was interviewed on several national news programs about the content of the song as well as his views about the debt ceiling.

At the end of 2021, with the U.S. government's debt more than double what it was when he released his first track on the subject, Remy put out a sequel.

Since 2010, Munasifi has partnered with Reason TV and the Reason Foundation to create libertarian parody videos. These examine various topics, including crime, police accountability, tariffs, cryptocurrency, inflation, and wasteful government spending.

In 2020, he created a second channel, MTGRemy, which posts parody songs and skits about the popular trading card game, Magic the Gathering.

== Discography ==
=== Studio albums ===
the cd

- Released: 2009
- Format: CD
- Writer: Remy Munasifi
- Tracks: "Two Percent Milk: The Rap", "Eggs Over Easy: The Rap", "It's Been Declined", "Warcraft: The Rap", "Turbo Tax: The Rap", "McDonald's: The Rap", "Remy's Debate Question", "Fantasy Football: The Rap", "Birthday Hat: The Rap", "What a Day It's Been!", "Happy Holidays: The Rap", "Opposites Attract", "Extra Cheese: The Rap", "Hummus: The Rap", "Slow Jam", "Partly Cloudy: The Rap"

=== EPs ===
- The Falafel Album (2010)
