= Abi Varghese =

Indian-American writer-director-producer

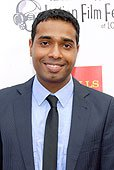
- Education: New York University
- Occupations: Television director, Film director
- Years active: 2008–present

Abi Varghese is an Indian-American writer-director-producer and the Founder and Chief Creative Officer at Infamous Coconuts, a production house based in LA and presence in New York and Mumbai, India.

He has directed season 2 of Eros Now's Metro Park as well as is best known for his Netflix series Brown Nation. He is also the co-director of Akkara Kazhchakal a Malayalam sitcom that completed four seasons. He also directed the first episode of the Netflix series Bhaag Beanie Bhaag.

His feature film Monsoon Mangoes, which was about an amateur filmmaker claiming to be the next film legend, starred Fahad Fasil and Vijay Raaz.

Infamous Coconuts, the independent production company founded by Abi Varghese, is currently developing multiple digital series. The company has expanded its operations to include a full-service creative agency specializing in digital and advertising content, a production-on-hire model for international collaborations in the United States, and an event platform facilitating U.S. tours for global artists.

== Personal life ==
Varghese was born in Adoor, Kerala and moved out to United States at the age of four along with his parents. He was working at Unilever for a short period before starting his television career. He is an alumnus of New York University.

Raised in Englewood, New Jersey, he is a resident of nearby Norwood.

== Television career ==
=== Short films ===
Varghese directed several short films early in his career.

=== Shortfilms (as director) ===
Year	Title	Cast	Notes
2010	Return Address	Jim Donovan, Jon Crefeld, Mary-Nicole Dorn	
2009	The Blood Bank	Dan Conrad, Marc Seidenstein	
2008	The Master Chef	David T. Crowe, Dan Conrad, Greg Vorob	
2007	Wintimidation	Dan Conrad, Greg Vorob, Jeanine Marie Conrad	
2007	I'm Bill Myrtle, Your Next Congressman	Greg Vorob, Dan Conrad, Elmer J. Santos	

=== Television serials ===
Varghese is perhaps best known for his Netflix released show Brown Nation. The show released on 15 November 2016 and currently has an 8.6 on IMDb and a 99% on Rotten Tomatoes. Akkara Kazhchakal is a Malayalam sitcom that aired on Kairali TV from 2008 to 2010.

=== Television Series (as director) ===
Year	Title	Notes
2019―present	Metro Park	Eros Now
2020	Bhaag Beanie Bhaag	Netflix
2016	Brown Nation	Netflix
2008	Akkara Kazhchakal	

== Film career ==
Abi Varghese made his feature film directorial debut with Akkarakazhchakal: The Movie in 2011 which was released in the United States.

The movie was based out of his earlier sitcom Akkarakazhchakal. His second film is Monsoon Mangoes. which has Fahad Fasil as the lead actor. He has a production house named ‘Infamous Coconut Productions'.

== Filmography (as director) ==
Year	Title	Notes
2011	Akkarakazhchakal: The Movie	Debut film
2016	Monsoon Mangoes	
