= Akkara Kazhchakal =

Indian Malayalam-language television series

- Logo
- Created by: Abi Varghese; Ajayan Venugopalan
- Starring: Jose Valiyakallumkall; Sajini Sachariah; Jacob Gregory; Litto Joseph; Priya Joseph; Cynthia Elizabeth Giannetti
- Composer: Kedaar Kumar
- Country of origin: India
- No. of seasons: 4
- No. of episodes: 50

Production
- Production location: United States
- Running time: 18 minutes (approx.)

Original release
- Network: Kairali TV
- Release: 15 February 2008 – 2010

Akkara Kazhchakal (transl. Sights of a foreign land) is an Indian Malayalam-language sitcom that aired on Kairali TV from 2008 to 2010. The series consisted of fifty episodes which chronicled the lives of a middle-class Malayali family settled in the United States of America. The show was created by Abi Varghese and Ajayan Venugopalan and starred relative newcomers as the leads.

The show is regarded as the first true Malayalam sitcom with real-life situations and witty dialogues. The series was considered a refreshing break for the Malayali audience. It broke broadcasting conventions when it was uploaded to YouTube in its entirety by the show's creators. Akkara Kazhchakal has enjoyed widespread popularity during its initial run as well as in the subsequent years. The series has been especially commended for its realistic portrayal of day-to-day Malayali life, social commentary and satirical humour. Josekutty Valiyakallumkal has been widely praised for his portrayal of George Thekkumoottil, the patriarch of the family.

The show's popularity lead to a film titled Akkarakazhchakal: The Movie.

== Premise ==
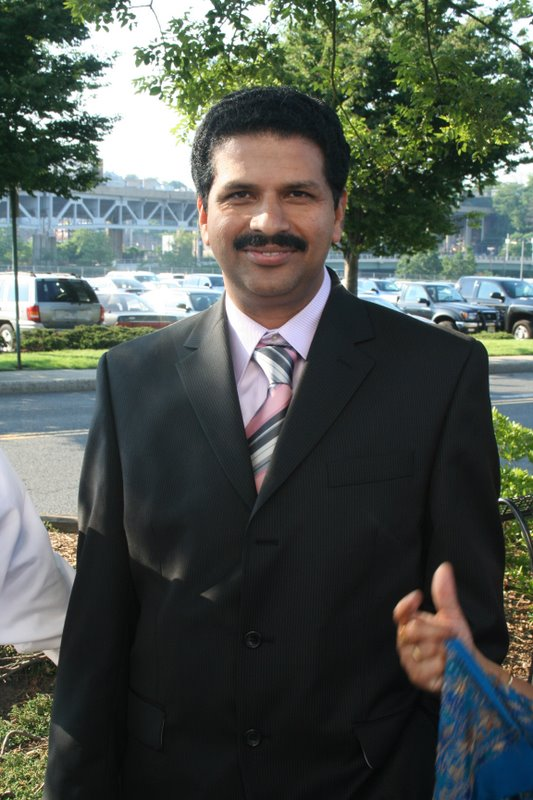
Josekutty Valiyakallumkal who plays George Thekkinmootil

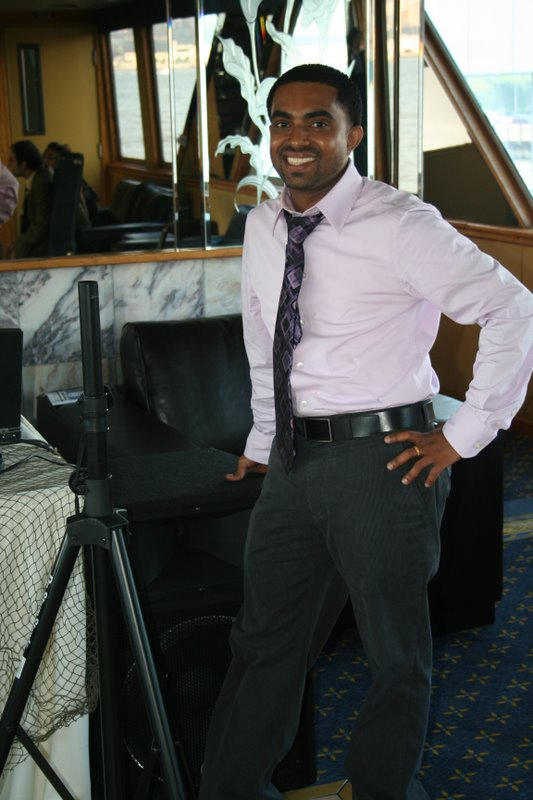
Jacob Gregory who plays Gregory

George Thekkinmootil is a Malayali from Aymanam. He moved to the U.S., after marrying Rincy who is a nurse working in New Jersey. Having grown up in Kerala, he is often nostalgic and emotional about his homeland. Rincy, by contrast has accustomed to the American life, and is not bothered much by it. A running gag throughout the show is the cultural divide between George and his children. Though he is critical of their embracement of the American culture, he is a loving father and often tells them how fortunate they are to enjoy such a great life in America. At the onset of the series, George is stuck in a job that he dislikes and tries launching various businesses, all of which backfire. He finally settles down as an insurance agent after clearing the Insurance License Exam, and starts his own Insurance firm.

Gregory is George's ever-stammering insurance assistant. Even though his actual name is Gregory, George calls him "Girigiri" because of his stammering. His constant need for snacks is often criticized by George. Rincy is very fond of Gregory and considers him like the younger brother she never had. Gregory walks out after being irritated by Appachan, and Candy is recruited to take his place. But soon Gregory joins back as Candy steals George's laptop & runs away and he got fired from his job.

Another plot line that runs parallel to George's is Mahesh (Mahi) and Babykuttan (Baby). They land in the U.S. from Kerala through George's friend, Jose, who is a placement agent in New Jersey. On their very first day, they almost ended up being arrested by a cop after the fire alarm went off because they burned an omelet. The police officer mistook their Puttu Kodam, used for making Puttu, for a marijuana (colloquially "pot") vaporizer. Their housemates Krish (Jayan Joseph) and Baiju (Geo Thomas) moved in with them after losing their jobs during the IT recession.

There are a few episodes in which Appachan prepares grape pickles around the grape season, and Girigiri helps him sell them in the local Indian grocery store under the brand name Appachan's Achar.

== Cast ==
=== Main ===
- Josekutty Valiyakallumkal as George Thekkinmootil (Chettai/Kochu Kunju), an insurance agent
- Sajini Sachariah as Rincy George, George's wife, a nurse by profession
- Febin Joseph as Matt (Mathaikunju), George's son
- Felisha Joseph as Chakkimol, George's daughter
- Jacob Gregory as Gregory John (Girigiri), George's assistant

=== Recurring ===
Character	Portrayed by	Role	Ref.
Appachan	Paulose Palatty	George's father	
Mahesh (Mahi)	Hari Dev	Nurse	
Babykuttan	Sanjeev Nair	Nurse	
Baiju	Geo Thomas	Software engineer	
Krishankutty (Krish)	Jayan Joseph	Software engineer	
Sunny Singh	Amarpreet Nanda	Roommate of Mahi and Babykuttan	
Shiny	Shine Roy	Rincy's friend	
Jacob Embranthiri	Saji Sebastian	A wine-loving scientist and Shiny's husband.	
Achan	Joseph Mathew Kuttolamadom	Parish Priest	
Prasava Gopi	Devassy Palatti	Insurance agent. George's main competitor in the field	
Candy	Cynthia Elizabeth Giannetti	George's Temporary assistant	
Manager	Gracey James	George's manager	
Ikkili Chacko	Sunny Kalloppara	Dispatcher at George's workplace	
Jose	Kurian Valiyakallumkal	Georgekutty's friend	
Philip	Rengit Peter Madaparambath	Video cassette loaner	
Richard	Bris Kocak	Nursing superintendent	
Policeman	Richard Lampone	Policeman who questions Mahi & Babykuttan	
Paul	Greg Vorob	Josekutty's neighbour	
Molly	Malini Krishna	Chackochan's wife	
Chackochan	Peter Neendoor		
Soman	Soman	Malayali shop owner	

== Episode list ==
No.	Title
1	"Church Going"
The George family prepares to go to church.
2	"Malayalam Culture"
George installs Malayalam channels to teach his children some "Malayalam Culture."
3	"New Nurses"
George picks up 2 nurses who immigrate to America from Kerala and places them in a guest house.
4	"George's New Business Idea"
George tries to start a business by selling imported ayurvedic fat burning products from Kerala.
5	"Christmas Invitation"
George is invited to a Christmas get-together at Chacko's house.
6	"Haunting"
George's house is haunted by a Madama Ghost.
7	"George's New Diet Plan"
Rincy forces George to go on a new diet plan.
8	"Insurance Agent Exam"
George studies to become an insurance agent.
9	"New Marketing Techniques"
George tries to grow Thekummootil Insurance Corp with new marketing techniques.
10	"Feng Shui"
George tries out Feng Shui after getting injured trying to keep his children active in their vacation
11	"Dating Scene"
Mahesh and Babykuttan try dating with their housemate Krishnakutty.
12	"The Poet"
Gregory finds his hidden talent of poetry.
13	"New Pet"
George buys pet goldfish as George's children wanted a pet.
14	"The Handyman"
George hires a handyman.
15	"India Trip"
Rincy plans a trip to India.
16	"Sameway"
Babykuttan joins Sameway (a multi-layer marketing company).
17	"The Millionaire"
Babykuttan tries to be a Sameway millionaire.
18	"The Small Party"
George has a "small party" while Rincy is away.
19	"Rincy's Return"
Rincy returns with Appachan.
20	"Matt Grows Up"
Matt grows up.
21	"The Party"
George and Family gets invited to a party.
22	"Gregory Resigns"
Gregory resigns.
23	"New Work"
Gregory's first day at Blimpie.
24	"New Assistant"
George's new assistant.
25	"Driving Lessons"
Babykuttan learns to drive.
26	"Generation Gap"
Mahi tries to change career.
27	"Midlife Crisis"
Mahi tries to change career.
28	"The Superstar"
George brings a superstar home.
29	"Candy Problem"
The candy problem
30	"Garbage Collection"
Appachan and GiriGiri's new hobby.
31	"Appachan's Krishi"
Appachan tries his hand at agriculture.
32	"Appachan's Achar"
Appachan makes achar.
33	"Omana Onam"
Omana Onam 2008
34	"Job Search"
Job, car and wife search.
35	"Back to School"
Back to school
36	"Halloween"
Halloween
37	"Mahi's Dilemma"
Mahi's dilemma
38	"The Rat Problem"
The rat problem
39	"Doctor's Visit"
George goes to the doctor.
40	"Black Friday"
Black Friday
41	"Brother Visits"
Rincy's brother visits.
42	"Infomercial"
Infomercial
43	"Christmas Again"
Christmas
44	"Baby Sitting"
Appachan babysits
45	"The Love Letter"
The love letter
46	"Surprise Birthday"
Appachan's birthday
47	"DJ.KJ"
George's nephew DJ KJ comes to his house for two weeks and Gregory tries to adapt with his style.
48	"Going Home"
George plans to go back to India and makes a plan to build a new house near Meenachil river.
49	"English Tutor"
Babykuttan's English tutor
50	"New Car"
George buys a New Benz

== Production ==
"We used to sit around after shoots and just discuss things that are going around with our families. Whenever we hear interesting subjects or funny anecdotes, we would often think of making that part of an episode. It got so bad that we were constantly looking at family members, friends for stories that can inspire us"

— Abi Varghese on the origin of the sitcom's stories, 2020

Abi Varghese was unable to get producers to finance a Malayalam film. He met Ajayan Venugopalan and decided to make a television series based on their own lives. Varghese and Venugopalan discussed the scripts during lunch breaks since they both had corporate jobs. Many incidents from Varghese's real life were used in the television series. A group of local artists dubbed the "Infamous Coconuts" acted in the film for fun and were not paid. Varghese edited the episodes during the nights.

=== Filming locations ===
- The house of George Thekkinmootil's family is located in Englewood which is Abi Varghese's real home.
- Mahi and Babykuttan stay in a house that is located in North Brunswick, Ajayan Venugopalan's real home.

== Soundtrack ==
All music is composed by Kedaar Kumar.

Track listing
No.	Title	Length
1.	"AK Theme"	1:07
2.	"AK Theme"	1:02
3.	"Slow (Bass & Flute)"	0:40
4.	"Slow (Bass & Horns)"	0:42
5.	"AK Theme (Horns)"	1:08
Total length:		4:39

== Akkara Kazchakal - The Movie ==
Following the success of Akkara Kazhchakal, the team planned to release a movie calling it Akkara Kazhchakal - The Movie. The movie was released in the United States on 29 April 2011, and produced by Infamous Coconuts & BOM TV.

In the film, Thekkinmootil Family decides to move Appachan and Ammachi to an old age home in Kerala. Meanwhile, between the jobs and a new insurance office, George and Rincy finds it hard to spend time with the family. With Rincy, kids and Appachan complaining about a much needed break, George finally decides to take the family on a vacation to Niagara Falls.

== Critical reception ==
Nita Sathyendran of The Hindu reviewed, "It looks like George has not only delivered on his promise but has also managed to endear himself to his viewers." Jacob A. C. of Mathrubhumi said, "The victory of Akkara Kazhchakal lies in the fact that it was able to introduce the day to day life of an Malayali-American a lighter mood."

== Show timings ==
Country	Showtime	Re-run
India		10:00pm IST - 10:30pm IST (Mon)
United States	15:00 EST - 15:30 EST (Sat)	22:30 EST - 23:00 EST (Fri)

=== Viewership ===
This sitcom had an estimated 80,000 weekly viewers.

== See also ==
- Metro Park
