= List of Malayalam films of 2007 =

The following is the list of Malayalam films released in 2007. It does not include film festival screenings.

== Films ==
Mo	Title	Director	Screenplay	Cast
J A N	Avan Chandiyude Makan	Thulasidas		Prithviraj Sukumaran, Vijayaraghavan, Sreedevika
J A N	Anchil Oral Arjunan	Anil	T. A. Razzaq	Jayaram, Padmapriya, Samvrutha Sunil
J A N	Kaiyoppu	Ranjith	Ranjith	Mammootty, Khushbu
J A N	Inspector Garud	Johny Antony	Udayakrishna-Sibi K Thomas	Dileep, Kavya Madhavan
F E B	Changathipoocha	S. P. Mahesh		Jayasurya, Remya Nambeeshan, Radhika, Harisree Ashokan, Nedumudi Venu, Jagathy Sreekumar
F E B	Mayavi	Shafi	Rafi Mecartin	Mammootty, Suraj Venjaramood, Gopika, Manoj K. Jayan
F E B	Detective	Jeethu Joseph	Jeethu Joseph	Suresh Gopi, Sindhu Menon
F E B	Raakilipattu	Priyadarsan		Jyothika, Tabu, Sharbani Mukherjee
F E B	Ananda Bhairavi	Jayaraaj		Sai Kumar, Master Devadas
F E B	Sketch	Prasad Yadav		Saiju Kurup, Sindhu Menon, Karate Raja, Jagathy Sreekumar
M A R	Speed Track	Jayasurya		Dileep, Gajala, Riyaz Khan, Madhu Warrier, Jagathy Sreekumar
M A R	Payum Puli	Mohan Kupleri		Kalabhavan Mani, Rambha, Riyaz Khan, Sai Kumar, Bheeman Raghu, Ponnambalam, Jagathy Sreekumar
M A R	November Rain	Vinu Joseph		Arun, Sajeevan, Aniyappan, Geetha, Lalu Alex
M A R	Abraham & Lincoln	Pramod Pappan		Kalabhavan Mani, Rahman, Anoop Menon
A P R	Chotta Mumbai	Anwar Rasheed	Benny P Nayarambalam	Mohanlal, Kalabhavan Mani, Indrajith Sukumaran, Siddique, Jagathy Sreekumar
A P R	Vinodayathra	Sathyan Anthikkad	Sathyan Anthikkad	Dileep, Meera Jasmine, Mukesh
A P R	Big B	Amal Neerad	Amal Neerad	Mammootty, Bala, Manoj K Jayan, Mamta Mohandas
A P R	Panthaya Kozhi	M. A. Venu		Narain, Pooja, Rama Reddyp
A P R	Athisayan	Vinayan		Master Devadas, Jackie Shroff, Jayasurya, Kavya Madhavan
A P R	Paranju Theeratha Visheshangal	Harikumar		Suresh Gopi, Lakshmi Gopalaswamy, Manya
A P R	Komban	Mummy Century		Jagadish, Salim Kumar
A P R	Raakilipattu	Priyadarshan		Jyothika, Tabu, Sharbani Mukherjee
M A Y	Goal	Kamal		Rejith Menon, Aksha Pardasany, Muktha, Rahman
M A Y	Soorya Kireedam	George Kithu		Nishanth Sagar, Shammi Thilakan, Indrajith Sukumaran, Remya Nambeesan
M A Y	Kaakki	Bipin Prabhakaran		Prithviraj Sukumaran, Mukesh, Manasa
M A Y	Time	Shaji Kailas	Rajesh Jayaraman	Suresh Gopi, Vimala Raman, Padmapriya
J U N	Rakshakan	Thulasidas		Kalabhavan Mani, Manya, Ashish Vidyarthi
J U N	Nanma	Sarathchandran Wayanad		Kalabhavan Mani, Rahman, Dhanya Mary Varghese
J U N	Pranayakalam	Uday Ananthan		Ajmal Ameer, Vimala Raman
J U N	Aakasham	Sundar Das		Harisree Ashokan, Jyothirmayi
J U N	Best Friends	Sunil P. Kumar		Mukesh, Arun, Sunaina
J U N	Bharathan Effect	Anil Das	Madhu Muttom	Biju Menon, Suresh Gopi, Geethu Mohandas
J U N	Nagaram	M. A. Nishad		Kalabhavan Mani, Biju Menon, Gopika, Seema
J U L	July 4	Joshi		Dileep, Roma, Siddique
J U L	Hallo	Rafi Mecartin	Rafi Mecartin	Mohanlal, Parvati Melton, Jagathy Sreekumar
J U L	Arabikatha	Lal Jose	Iqbal Kuttipuram	Sreenivasan, Chang Shumin, Samvrutha Sunil, Indrajith
J U L	Veeralipattu	Kukku Surendran		Prithviraj, Padmapriya
J U L	Nadiya Kollappetta Rathri	K. Madhu	S N Swami	Suresh Gopi, Kavya Madhavan
J U L	Sooryan	V M Vinu		Jayaram, Vimala Raman
J U L	Thaniye	Babu Thiruvalla		Nedumudi Venu, Lakshmi Gopalaswamy
J U L	Mission 90 Days	Major Ravi	Major Ravi	Mammootty, Tulip Joshi
A U G	Heart Beats	Vinu Anand		Indrajith, Simran
A U G	A. K. G.	Shaji N. Karun		P. Sreekumar
A U G	Thakarachenda	Avira Rebecca		Sreenivasan, Geethu Mohandas
A U G	Ali Bhai	Shaji Kailas	T. A. Shahid	Mohanlal, Gopika, Navya Nair, Shamna Kassim, Siddique
A U G	Nivedyam	Lohithadas	Lohithadas	Vinu Mohan, Bhama
A U G	Ore Kadal	Shyamaprasad	Shyamaprasad	Mammootty, Meera Jasmine, Narain, Ramya Krishnan
A U G	Kichamani MBA	Samad Mankada		Suresh Gopi, Navya Nair, Jayasurya
S E P	Indrajith	Haridas		Kalabhavan Mani; Riyaz Khan
	Mini Makers	James Morgan	Elen Rhys	Green Dark Blue Red Purple Pink Yellow Peach Brown Grey Black Orange Light Blue
O C T	Paradesi	P. T. Kunju Mohammad	P. T. Kunju Mohammad	Mohanlal, Lakshmi Gopalaswami, Padmapriya
O C T	Chocolate	Shafi	Sachi - Sethu	Prithviraj, Roma, Jayasurya, Samvritha, Remya Nambeesan
O C T	Nasrani	Joshi	Ranjith	Mammootty, Vimala Raman, Muktha, Biju Menon, Arun, Kalbhavan Mani
O C T	Black Cat	Vinayan	Vinayan	Suresh Gopi, Meena, Ashish Vidyarthi
O C T	Ottakkayyan	G. R. Indugopan	G. R. Indugopan	Harisree Ashokan, Arun, Ashokan, T G Ravi, Rani Babu
O C T	Subhadram	Sreelal Devaraj		Jayakrishnan, Padmakumar
N O V	Naalu Pennungal	Adoor Gopalakrishnan		Nandita Das, Padmapriya, Manju Pillai, Geethu Mohandas, Kavya Madhavan, Mukesh, Manoj K. Jayan
N O V	Hareendran Oru Nishkalankan	Vinayan		Indrajith, Jayasurya, Sherin, Manikuttan, Bhama
N O V	Ayur Rekha	G. M. Manu		Sreenivasan, Mukesh, Lakshmi Sharma, Uravashi
N O V	Rock n' Roll	Ranjith	Ranjith	Mohanlal, Lakshmi Rai
D E C	Romeoo	Rajasenan	Rafi Mecartin	Dileep, Vimala Raman, Samvrutha Sunil, Sruthi Lakshmi
D E C	Katha Parayumpol	Mohanan	Sreenivasan	Mammootty, Sreenivasan, Meena
D E C	Kangaroo	Raj Babu		Prithviraj, Kavya Madhavan, Jayasurya, Kaveri
D E C	Flash	Sibi Malayil		Mohanlal, Parvathy, Indrajith, Shamna Kassim
	Akkare Ninnoru Sultan			
	Kaliyorukkam			
	Before the Rains			
	Atheetham			
	Unni			
	Virus	Shankar		Abhinay
	Players	Vasudeva Sanal	Vasudeva Sanal	Jishnu Raghavan, Jayasurya, Kavya Madhavan

== Dubbed films ==
Title	Director(s)	Original film		Cast	Ref.
Title	Director(s)	Film	Language	Cast	Ref.
Hey Taxi	Rajendraprasad Singh	Love	Kannada	Mohanlal	
Happy, Be Happy	A. Karunakaran	Happy	Telugu	Allu Arjun, Genelia D'Souza	
Challenge	S.S. Rajamouli	Sye	Telugu		
Something Something	Sreenivas		Telugu		
Boss, I Love You	Aditya	Boss	Telugu		
Devadas	Chaudri Chakri	Devadasu	Telugu		
Bunny	VV Vinayak	Bunny	Telugu		
Yogi	V V Vinayak	Yogi	Telugu		
Bhasmasuran	Ravishankar	Durgi	Kannada		
Munna	Vamshi	Munna	Telugu		
Hero, the Real Hero	Puri Jagannadh	Desamuduru	Telugu	Allu Arjun, Hansika Motwani	
Malleeswari, the Princess	Vijayabhaskar	Malliswari	Telugu		
Kelkatha Shabdam	Vasanth	Satham Podathey	Tamil		
Happy Days	Shekar Kamula	Happy Days	Telugu		
Jai Jagannatha	Sabyasachi Mohapatra		Hindi	Sarat Pujari, Sadhu Meher	
