= Hey Jude (film) =

2018 film directed by Shyamaprasad

- Poster
- Directed by: Shyamaprasad
- Written by: Nirmal Sahadev; George Kanatt
- Produced by: Anil Ambalakkara
- Starring: Nivin Pauly; Trisha Krishnan
- Cinematography: Girish Gangadharan
- Edited by: Karthik Jogesh
- Music by: Songs: Rahul Raj; Ouseppachan; M. Jayachandran; Gopi Sundar; Background Score: Oueseppachan
- Production company: Ambalakkara Global Films
- Distributed by: E4 Entertainment
- Release date: 2 February 2018
- Country: India
- Language: Malayalam

Hey Jude is a 2018 Indian Malayalam-language romantic comedy film directed by Shyamaprasad, written by Nirmal Sahadev and George Kanatt. It stars Nivin Pauly and Trisha Krishnan in lead roles and marks Trisha's Malayalam debut. The film features songs composed by Rahul Raj, Ouseppachan, M. Jayachandran and Gopi Sundar. The film released on 2 February 2018, where it received mixed-to-positive reviews from critics. The film was a box office bomb.

== Plot ==
Dominic is the owner of an antique shop in Cochin. His family consists of his wife Maria, daughter Andrea, and son Jude. Though Jude is a mathematical genius and an oceanography enthusiast, he has poor social skills and lacks maturity for his age. He has no friends and always gets on the wrong side with his father. Jude also gets fired from his job and is forced by his father to assist him at his antique shop.

One day Dominic gets a phone call from Goa that his paternal aunt Olivia has died in an accident and all her properties are now inherited by himself and his son Jude. Dominic, Maria, and Jude travel to Goa for the funeral and the property settlement while Andrea remains in Cochin to attend her exams and take care of Dominic's business. At Goa, they meet Dr.Sebastian and his daughter Crystal, the tenants of the outhouse in the late aunt's bungalow. Crystal runs a beachside cafe and is also part of a music band. Dominic is often irritated by Sebastian's jolly good friendly nature and their late-night music rehearsals and vows to evict them as soon as possible, even though Sebastian has a valid lease agreement. Dominic keeps sending Jude as a messenger to Sebastian's house to pass on his new house rules. Sebastian, Crystal, and Jude get into little tiffs initially but slowly they warm up to each other and become friends. Sebastian, who is a psychologist, notices Jude's obsession with numbers, his exceptional mathematical skills, his social awkwardness and concludes that Jude has autism spectrum disorder.

Crystal invites Jude for a party one evening and Jude decides not to go because of his awkwardness. Crystal is disappointed and goes into a sudden fit of rage and pelts stones at Jude's windows and then Jude understands that she is suffering from bipolar disorder and is under treatment for it. Jude apologizes the next day and they resolve their misunderstanding. Sebastian and Crystal try to help Jude with his social skills and on multiple visits to his room, Crystal steals some of his video journal tapes to understand more about Jude's life. They learn of his exceptional knowledge in oceanography and teach him swimming and diving to overcome his Aquaphobia.

While Dominic tries his best to evict Sebastian and Crystal out of his property, Jude finds new friends in them, something that he has never had in his life and he also begins to like Goa. Crystal helps Jude prepare for an interview at the National Institute of Oceanography. Jude does not clear the interview due to his poor social skills, despite his knowledge. However, one of the interviewers notices an outside conversation between Jude and Crystal and realizes that he is extraordinarily skilled in oceanography. Jude's parents disapprove of his newfound interest in Crystal's music band and his decision to find a job in Goa. They warn him to cut off his ties with Crystal and Sebastian. Jude is annoyed by this and on Crystal's idea, he elopes from his house for a couple of days with Crystal and her friends to play music at a wedding. They both have a good time there, become close to each other, and fall in love, but when Crystal tries to kiss Jude, he avoids her and runs off, leaving her irritated.

On the other hand, Dominic also softens up when he learns that Sebastian has been helping Jude with his autism spectrum disorder and decides not to be rude to Jude and Sebastian anymore. When Jude returns to Goa, Dominic informs him that he wants to throw a party and he would like Jude to invite all the friends he made to Goa. Jude is excited and goes to Crystal's house to invite her. While looking for her, he finds all his video journal tapes that she stole from him and all of Sebastian's notes about his behavior. He becomes angry at Sebastian and Crystal, who is again ill from her bipolar disorder, and shouts at both of them for tricking him in the name of friendship and using him as a guinea pig for their gains. Crystal is annoyed and asks him to cut off all ties with her.

The next day at the party, Dominic suddenly has a heart attack and dies unexpectedly. This changes plans for Jude and his family and they decide not to evict Sebastian and Crystal and leave their newly inherited property behind and go back to Cochin. Before leaving, Jude tries to speak to Crystal but she doesn't even let him say goodbye. Back in Cochin, Jude tries to take care of his father's antique shop and understands all his accounts easily. He also discovers that his sister Andrea has embezzled some of the money from the shop for her boyfriend, but he forgives her anyway. He receives a letter from Crystal who says goodbye to Jude since she has decided to go to Shimla for some time as a volunteer and also for a change in her life. Days go on and Jude receives an offer letter from the National Institute of Oceanography in Goa for an even better position than the one he applied for. At his mother's insistence, the family goes back to Goa and Jude joins in his new job. He continues to communicate with Crystal and follows all her suggestions and advice and becomes a better person socially.

Crystal finally returns to Goa and her family and friends are happy to see her again. Jude and Crystal continue to be good friends and nothing has changed between them and their lives are happy.

== Cast ==
- Nivin Pauly as Jude Dominic Aldo Rodrigues
- Trisha Krishnan as Crystal Ann Chakkraaparambil
- Siddique as Dominic Aldo Rodrigues, Jude's father
- Neena Kurup as Maria Rodrigues, Jude's mother
- Vijay Menon as Dr. Sebastian Chakkaraparambil, Crystal's father
- Apoorva Bose as Andrea Rodrigues, Jude's sister
- Aju Varghese as George Kurian, Car Passenger
- Shyamaprasad as Vasudeva Iyyer, Managing Director Of Oceania Private Limited

== Production ==
Once while Shyamaprasad was visiting a café named after the Beatles, the title character from one of his favourite Beatles songs "Hey Jude" entered his mind. He then decided to "make a film about a character called Jude" and name the film after the song. The film marks Trisha's debut in Malayalam cinema. Principal photography began in July 2017 at Goa, and ended in January 2018.

== Music ==
The film features songs composed by five different composers, all of whom have individually worked on Shyamaprasad's previous films; Rahul Raj who composed for Ritu, Ouseppachan who composed for Ore Kadal, M. Jayachandran who composed for Akale and Gopi Sundar who worked in Ivide. Ouseppachan also composed the score.

Tracklisting

1. "Hey Don't Worry Jude" - Rahul Raj, Kavya Ajith—Rahul Raj - Vinayak Sasikumar
2. "Meenukal Vannupoyi" - Amal Antony, Sayanora Philip—Ousepachan - Madhu Vasudevan
3. "Nishaa Shalabhame" - Shakthisree Gopalan—M. Jayachandran - Prabha Varma
4. "Yela La La" - Madhav Nair—Gopi Sundar - B. K. Harinarayanan
5. "Rock Rock"-Sayanora Philip-Ousepachan-Shyamaprasad

== Reception ==
On the review aggregator website Rotten Tomatoes, 80% of 5 critics' reviews are positive, with an average rating of 5.8/10.

Deepika Jayaram of The Times of India gave 3/5 stars and wrote, "Hey Jude is a coming-of-age story, be it for Jude, Crystal, Dominic or the audience as it teaches us that there is an abnormality in almost everyone and life doesn’t stop there." Anna MM Vetticad of Firstpost gave 2.5/5 stars and wrote, "The delicacy with which Hey Jude treads around its central character in its pre-interval portion is one of its many attractions. We are introduced to his multiple quirks with humour and affection, yet the storyteller is never patronising towards him." Manoj Kumar R of The Indian Express gave 2.5/5 stars and wrote, "Hey Jude is Nivin Pauly's canvas. He has gained a huge amount of body weight to play the character and strikes home with the performance of an unconfident, introvert person with serious socialising problems."

== Accolades ==
48th Kerala State Film Awards

- Kerala State Film Award for Best Costume Designer - Sakhi Elsa
- Kerala State Film Award for Best Choreography - Prasanna Sujit
- Kerala State Film Award – Special Mention - Vijay Menon

8th South Indian International Movie Awards

- SIMA Critics' choice for Best Actress - Malayalam - Trisha Krishnan
