= Giju John =

Indian actor and film producer (born 1975)

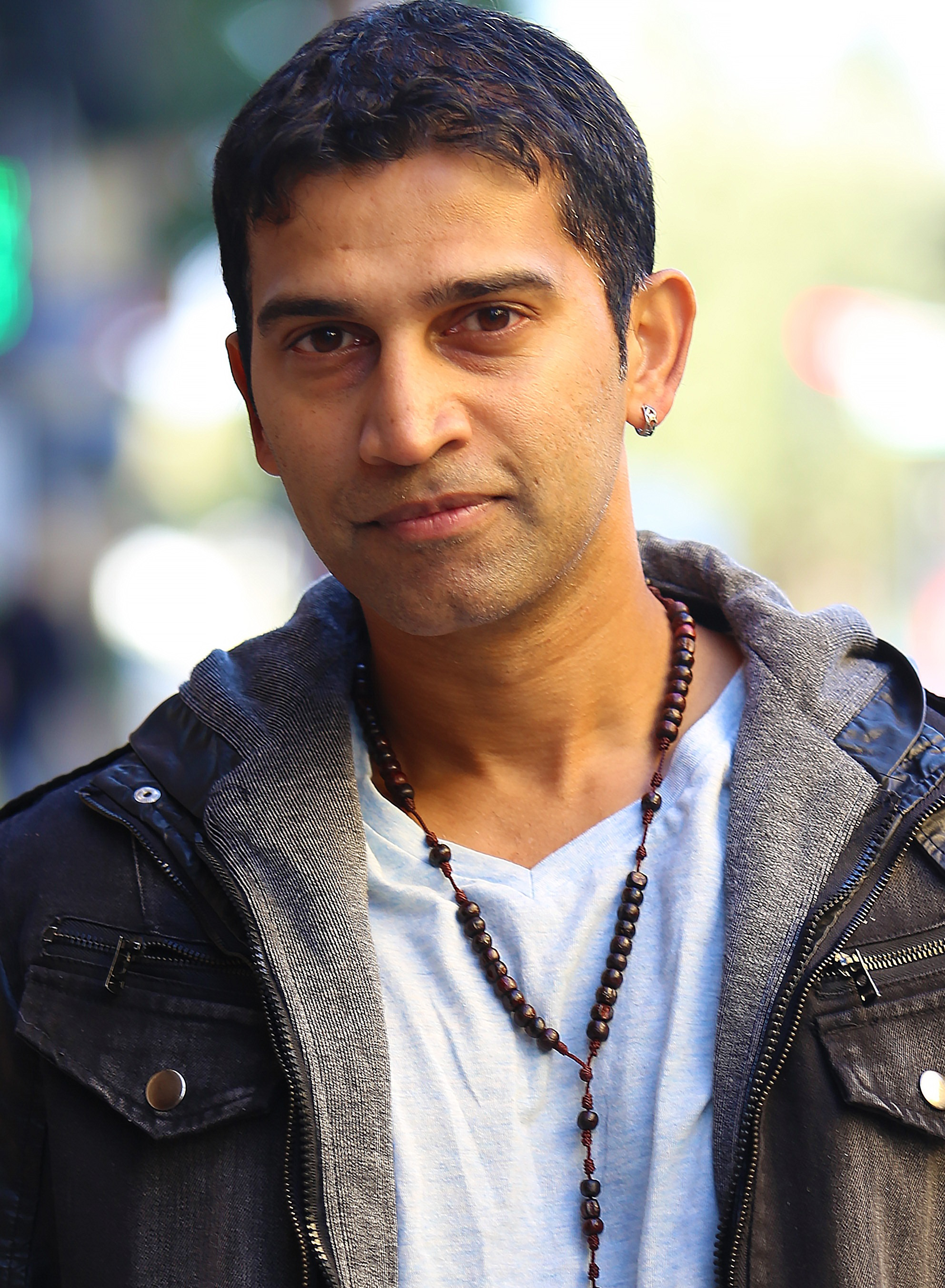
- Giju John on the set of the film Ranam
- Born: 10 February 1975 (age 51); Thiruvananthapuram, Kerala, India
- Occupations: Actor; film producer; singer; songwriter; dancer
- Years active: 2007–present
- Spouse: Kristen Nolan
- Website: gijujohn.com

Giju John is an Indian actor, film producer, singer, songwriter, and dancer who works in Malayalam and English films. Giju made his acting debut in the 2011 English film Love, Wrinkle-free before starring in the 2018 Malayalam film Ranam, later appearing in films such as Lucifer (2019) and Forensic (2020). He is also a film producer having produced films such as Love, Wrinkle-free (2011), and the television sitcom, Metro Park.

== Early and personal life ==
Giju John was born in Thiruvananthapuram, Kerala, India on 10 February 1975. Giju completed his secondary level education at St. Mary's Higher Secondary School, Thiruvananthapuram, and graduated from the Thangal Kunju Musaliar College of Engineering. He holds a Masters in Electrical and Electronics Engineering from the University of South Florida. The actor currently resides in Austin, Texas.

== Career ==
Giju John is an accomplished salsa dancer and choreographer who has professionally performed across the USA, India, and UK. He is the founder of Beyond Dreamz Entertainment, which produces music and dance projects in the Latina-Indian genre. He received training in carnatic music and bharatanatyam and is a member of the professional dance troupe, Salsamania Dance Company, which is based in San Francisco.

In 2007, he released his first album as a singer-songwriter "Rang Rangeli Yeh Duniya" which was a Latina-Indian fusion.

In 2010, he ventured into film production and founded Tiranga Productions. His first production venture was Love, Wrinkle-free which released in 2011. His second production venture was Hola Venky! in 2014 in which he worked with writer-director Sandeep Mohan. His third production venture titled Shreelancer released in 2017 received critical acclaim from critics and audiences.

He made his acting debut in the 2018 film Ranam. He second film as an actor was the Prithviraj Sukumaran directorial, Lucifer in 2019. The following year, he portrayed the antagonist in the film Forensic. In 2022, he reunited with director Nirmal Sahadev to produce and act in the film Kumari. His next film role was in the sequel to Lucifer, L2 Empuraan.

== Filmography ==
=== As actor ===
- Note, all films are in Malayalam, unless otherwise noted.

Year	Title	Role	Notes	Ref.
2011	Love, Wrinkle-free	Cleetus D'Cruz	English film	
2014	Hola Venky!	Kurian	English film	
2018	Ranam	Ahmed Siddique		
2019	Lucifer	Sanjeev Kumar		
2020	Forensic	Dr. Alphonse Kurien		
2022	Kumari	Kaanhirangat Achuthan		
2023	Antony	James		
2025	Identity	Rohan Rafael		
2025	L2: Empuraan	Sanjeev Kumar		

=== As producer ===
Year	Title	Language	Notes
2014	Love, Wrinkle-free	English	
2014	Hola! Venky	English	
2017	Shreelancer	Hindi; English	
2019	Nirmal Anand Ki Puppy	Hindi	
2019-2021	Metro Park	Hindi	Television series
2022	Kumari	Malayalam	

== Discography ==
=== Music albums ===
Year	Title	Ref.
2007	"Rang Rangeeli Yeh Duniya"	
2014	"Mas Bhagraton"	
2017	"Bachata Indu"	
