= Ranam (2018 film) =

2018 Indian Malayalam-language action thriller film

- Theatrical release poster
- Directed by: Nirmal Sahadev
- Written by: Nirmal Sahadev
- Produced by: Anand Payannur; Rani Lawson Biju
- Starring: Prithviraj Sukumaran; Rahman; Isha Talwar
- Cinematography: Jigme Tenzing
- Edited by: Sreejith Sarang
- Music by: Jakes Bejoy
- Production companies: Yes Cinema Production; Lawson Entertainment
- Distributed by: Goodwill Entertainments
- Release date: 6 September 2018 (India)
- Running time: 136 minutes
- Country: India
- Language: Malayalam

Ranam: Detroit Crossing (transl. Battle: Detroit Crossing) is a 2018 Indian Malayalam-language action thriller film written and directed by Nirmal Sahadev (in his directorial debut) and produced by Yes Cinema Production and Lawson Entertainment. The film stars Prithviraj Sukumaran, Rahman, and Isha Talwar.

Ranam was released on 6 September 2018 to mixed reviews from critics, but was declared a sleeper hit. Over the years, the film and its soundtrack has acquired a cult status due to its aesthetic making, songs and an Indo-American crossover.

== Plot ==
Aadhi, a former drug dealer and enforcer for Sri Lankan drug lord Damodar, lives in Detroit, which is situated on the Canada-United States border. Aadhi is working as a mechanic at a car workshop owned by his older cousin Bhaskaran. Bhaskaran's son Aju has a crush on his classmate Deepika, the daughter of a corrupt banker Rajan and his wife Seema. Seema gave birth to Deepika and got married at a young age. Deepika, who is a drug addict, has no respect for Seema. Rajan currently has no regard for Seema as a wife and has extramarital affairs with his female colleagues and secretary. Ahmed, an investigation officer and ex-boyfriend of Seema, knows about her condition very well.

Damodar, who wants Aadhi to work under him once again, decides to negotiate and entrusts Aju to transport the latest party drug, Redex, via Aju's friend, who is Damodar's aide. Aju is saved by Aadhi before he gets caught by the police. Bhaskar sends Aju to live with his relatives. Deepika, who has fallen for Aadhi, whom she always meets with Aju, leaves her house to meet him. But Aadhi asks her to leave, to which she refuses and leaves after forcefully buying a packet of Redex from him. That night, Deepika overdoses on Redex and dies, and Aadhi feels guilty about being responsible. Seema, shattered at Deepika's death, leaves her home after finding out that Rajan is continuing his affairs despite his daughter's death.

While traveling to Ahmed's house, a group of eve-teasers try to molest her, but Aadhi, who was with Seema all throughout the journey, saves her from them and safely drops Seema at Ahmed's home. Ahmed's wife is disturbed by Seema's presence, which causes Seema to voluntarily leave the house, where Aadhi takes Seema to his own house. However, Seema leaves the house after learning from Ahmed that Aadhi is part of the gang, which led to her daughter's death. Damodar plans to trigger a major attack during an important festivity in Detroit, killing three important aides of Antoni, the leader of a rival Polish gang. Damodar appoints his brothers Selvam, Aadhi, and Bhaskaran to carry out his operation. Aadhi is directed to park a car in the lot of a building in the heart of the city where the Polish gang is to have an emergency meeting. During the parking of the car, Aadhi finds a bomb at the rear end that will blast in a day's time. Bhaskar is unable to carry out a killing commissioned by Damodar, who later kills Bhaskar.

Enraged, Aadhi finishes Selvam and confronts Damodar at the same building in which he parked the car. A fight ensues, in which Aadhi is shot dangerously but overpowers Damodar and stabs him. It is shown that Aadhi had informed Antoni and his friends about Damodar's location. Antoni and his thugs arrive and kill Damodar by opening fire at him. As Aadhi walks away injured, locking the door, the bomb blasts, killing everyone inside. The dangerously injured Aadhi walks to Ahmed's office and collapses. Before arriving at Ahmed's office, Aadhi informed Seema to visit his house and check his car, which had an amount of money, and told her that half of the money should be given to Bhaskaran's wife and the other half is for herself. Aadhi also asks her to leave a far-off place (Toronto) for a new start. In the aftermath, Aadhi suddenly regains consciousness.

== Cast ==
- Prithviraj Sukumaran as Aadhi
- Rahman as Damodar Ratnam, a Sri Lankan Tamilian drug lord
- Isha Talwar as Seema, Deepika's mother (voice dubbed by Angel Shijoy)
- Giju John as Detective Ahmed Siddique
- Ashwin Kumar as Selvan, Damodar's brother and sidekick
- Arun Baby Mathew as Aju, Bhaskar's son
- Celine Joseph as Deepika, Seema's daughter
- Shivajith Padmanabhan as Rajan Kuriakose, Seema's husband
- Nandhu as Bhaskar, Aju's father and Aadhi's uncle
- Shyamaprasad as Chandran
- Sajini Sachariah as Rani, Bhaskar's wife
- Santhosh Keezhattoor as Swaminathan, Aadhi's father

== Production ==
=== Development ===
The film was first announced by Prithviraj Sukumaran in July 2016 through his Facebook page. He has mentioned that Ivide was his first honest attempt at a cross over the film from Malayalam, and his second one will be 'Ranam/Detroit Crossing'. Ranam is produced by Anand Payannur and Lawson Biju under the banner Yes Cinema Productions and Lawson Entertainment.

=== Casting ===
Initially, Mamta Mohandas was cast as the female lead paired opposite Prithviraj Sukumaran, but was replaced by Isha Talwar as the former was unable to allocate dates due to her prior commitment for Carbon. The film's schedule was postponed following certain technical issues. Tamil actors Sampath Raj and Ashwin Kkumar were cast in March 2017. However, Rahman replaced Raj in the role and joined the cast in October 2017.

=== Filming ===
Filming began in Augusta, Georgia on 22 August 2017. Filming was moved to Atlanta and Detroit for the remaining portions. The majority film was shot in the United States, with the remaining portions in Kerala. The film took 45 days to shoot.

== Soundtrack ==
The original soundtrack and background score were composed by Jakes Bejoy. The title track of the film was released on YouTube in March 2018, as a part of a promotion.

Ranam (Original Motion Picture Soundtrack)
No.	Title	Singer(s)	Length
1.	"Ranam (Title Track)"	Ajaey Shravan, Saint T.F.C., Neha Nair, Jakes Bejoy	5:01
2.	"Pathiye"	Vijay Yesudas	4:29
3.	"Ini Raave"	Vidhu Prathap	4:37
4.	"Damodhar (Theme)"	Instrumental	1:02
5.	"Soul of Ranam"	Instrumental	1:32

Ranam (Original Background Score)
No.	Title	Length
1.	"Intro–Second Chances"	1:17
2.	"Ranam Prelude"	2:02
3.	"Chase"	2:42
4.	"Damodhar Ratnam"	1:01
5.	"Seema Theme"	0:36
6.	"Let Antony Know"	1:49
7.	"Young Love"	0:59
8.	"Sign Boards"	1:30
9.	"Nice Way"	0:58
10.	"Marzaana"	2:49
11.	"Detroit Crossing"	2:28
12.	"Outro–A New Beginning"	1:18

== Release ==
Ranam was released on 6 September 2018 across 150 theaters in Kerala.

== Reception ==
=== Critical response ===
Anjana George of The Times of India gave 4/5 stars and wrote "Ranam is a ferociously intriguing tale which has set a new standard to the Mollywood metro gangster narratives. There is action, violence, romance, hope, helplessness and revenge." Behindwoods gave 3/5 and wrote "Ranam has good performances and strong technical qualities."

Anna M. M. Vetticad of Firstpost gave 2/5 stars and wrote "Without Prithviraj Sukumaran, Ranam would have been a run-of-the-mill crime story packaged with technical finesse. With him and Nirmal Sahadev's mature direction, it becomes something more than just the ordinary tale at its core." Manoj Kumar. R of The Indian Express gave 2/5 stars and wrote "Nirmal Sahadev is ambitious and his sense of style in storytelling is significant, but his debut film largely winds up being an exercise in style even when it seems it digs deeper."

S. R. Praveen of The Hindu wrote "The film is quite a mix, with the narrative failing to grip the audience except on rare occasions." Litty Simon of Onmanorama wrote "Ranam can't be hailed as one memorable gangster thriller but definitely it will be among the thoughtfully crafted ones. As Prithvi says, 'second chances are sometimes too costly' and hence probably action movie junkies shouldn't give Ranam a miss. The movie is one of Prithvirajs biggest hits"
