= Indrajith =

Indrajith, Indrajit or Indrajita may refer to:

- Indrajit or Meghanada, the son of the Lankan king Ravana in the ancient Indian epic Ramayana
- Indrajith Sukumaran, Indian film actor and singer
- Indrajith (1989 film), a 1989 Indian Kannada-language film
- Indrajith (2007 film), a 2007 Indian Malayalam-language film
- Indrajith (2017 film), a 2017 Indian Tamil-language action-adventure film
- Indrajit Diwan, fictional villain played by Danny Denzongpa in the 1997 Indian film Dhaal
