= Pigman (film) =

- First Look Poster
- Directed by: Avira Rebecca
- Written by: N. Prabhakaran
- Based on: Pigman by N. Prabhakaran
- Produced by: T. R. Sreeraj
- Starring: Jayasurya; Remya Nambeesan
- Cinematography: Vinod Illampilly
- Edited by: Nikhil Venu
- Music by: Rinil Gowtham
- Production company: Sree Surya Films
- Distributed by: Sreeraj Films
- Release date: 7 June 2013
- Country: India
- Language: Malayalam

Pigman is a 2013 Indian Malayalam-language drama film directed by Avira Rebecca and written by N. Prabhakaran based on his 1994 short story of the same name. The film stars Jayasurya and Remya Nambeesan, with Harisree Ashokan and Suraj Venjaramoodu in supporting roles. The film tells the story of a young man who dreams of securing high jobs by completing his doctorate, but is forced to spend his days in a pig farm.

== Cast ==
- Jayasurya as Sreekumar
- Remya Nambeesan as Sneha
- Harisree Ashokan as Thimmayyan
- Suraj Venjaramoodu as Dr. Daniel
- Baburaj as GM Veera Swamy
- M. R. Gopakumar as Madhavan
- Usha as Sreekumar's elder sister
- Nimisha Suresh as Mahalakshmi
- T. P. Madhavan as Union Head
- Reena Basheer as Dr. Jayalakshmi
- Jaffar Idukki as Davis

== Production ==
It is the second directorial venture of Avira Rebecca after Thakarachenda (2007). The story of the film was written by N. Prabhakaran in 1994.

The film had been announced and in pre-production stage for two years, the shoot was further postponed due to other films by lead actor Jayasurya and other members of the cast. The film was launched on 1 November 2011. Various actors and directors in Malayalam cinema including the director Avira Rebecca, Anoop Menon, Lijo Jose Pellissery and M. Jayachandran lit and attended the ceremonial lamp at the function. Shooting commenced on 10 November 2011 and Jayasurya was already set to showcase his skills as a performer in this unusual flick.

Pigman was announced to be predominantly set in various locations of Thodupuzha, Muvattupuzha and Idukki.
