= Avira Rebecca =

Indian filmmaker, and script writer

- Occupations: Director; Screenwriter
- Years active: 2007–present

Avira Rebecca is an Indian filmmaker, and script writer. He is most known for his award-winning debut art-house film titled Thakarachenda (2007), and got the Kerala State Film Award for Best Debut Director for the film.

== Films ==
#	Year	Title	Language	Starring	Notes
01	2007	Thakarachenda	Malayalam	Sreenivasan, Geetu Mohandas	Kerala State Film Award for Best Debut Director
02	2013	Pigman	Malayalam	Jayasurya, Remya Nambeesan	
03	2016	Negalukal	Malayalam	Manoj K. Jayan	Not released
