= Ashwin Mushran =

Indian actor and voice actor

- Born: Ashwin Mushran; Mumbai Maharashtra India
- Citizenship: Indian
- Education: Delhi world public school
- Alma mater: Hindu College; Drama Studio London
- Occupations: Actor; Voice actor
- Years active: 2006-present

Ashwin Mushran is an Indian actor and voice over artist. He has appeared in numerous movies and plays. He is also featured in the movie Quick Gun Murugan, as Dr. Django. He also lent his voice into dubbing several foreign media.

== Education ==
He was born to a Kashmiri Pandit father and a White British mother of English and German descent. Mushran's paternal family were displaced from Kashmir during the Exodus Of Kashmiri Pandits in the 1990s due to the Islamic militancy. Ashwin studied at The Doon School in Dehradun, Uttarakhand and then graduated with a Bachelor of Arts (Honours) degree in English Literature from Hindu College, University of Delhi in New Delhi. He then moved to England from India to study acting at the Drama Studio London in Ealing, West London.

== Career ==
Ashwin started out with TV commercials which led to him becoming a cast member of the cult Indian TV show, The Great Indian Comedy Show. From there he moved on to acting in feature films and has acted in many critically acclaimed films such as Lage Raho Munna Bhai, Life in a Metro and Fashion. Ashwin is heavily involved with theatre and is a voice over artiste as well.

== Dubbing career ==
He has dubbed for more than 1000 TV commercials and a number of movies in Africa English, and Chinese (both Mandarin and Cantonese); however, he said that he had no desire to dub for the leading men of Bollywood.

== Personal life ==
Mushran is married, and has a daughter

== Filmography ==
=== Films ===
Year	Title	Role	Notes
2006	Kudiyon Ka Hai Zamaana	Cyrus	
2006	Lage Raho Munna Bhai	Hari Desai	
2006	I See You	Dr. Shah	
2007	Life in a Metro	Abdullah Ansari	
2007	Ek Chalis Ki Last Local	Mr. Bajaj	
2008	One, Two, Three	D.M. Pipat	
2008	Krazzy 4	Pranav	
2008	The Mole	The Mob Boss	
2008	Yeh Mera India	Amarjit Singh	
2008	Fashion	Rohit Khanna	
2009	Quick Gun Murugun	Dr Django	
2009	Kambakkht Ishq	Parmeet	
2010	Hum Tum Aur Ghost	Mr Kapoor's Son	
2010	Bhoot and Friends	Gora Sa'ab	
2011	Always Kabhi Kabhi	Rahul Ghosh	
2011	Desi Boyz	Jerry's Lawyer	
2012	Love, Wrinkle-free	Jacob	English film
2013	Settai	Richard	Tamil film
2013	Rise of the Zombie		
2014	Hola Venky!	Psychiatrist	English film
2014	Main Tera Hero	Angad's Doctor	
2015	Island City		
2018	Sanju	Event manager	
2019	Total Dhamaal		
2022	Bachchhan Paandey	Producer Rakesh Verma	
2023	Shehzada	Kailash Jindal	
2024	V/H/S/Beyond	Manager	Segment: "Dream Girl"
2024	Vijay 69	Jaag	
2026	Happy Patel: Khatarnak Jasoos		

=== Television ===
Year	Title	Role	Notes
2004	The Great Indian Comedy Show		
2014–2015	Itna Karo Na Mujhe Pyar	Karan Kapoor	
2015	Peterson Hill	Peterson	
2018	Kulfi Kumar Bajewala	Roshan Kumar(RK)	
2020	Maharaj Ki Jai Ho!	Scientist	
2021	Dhadkan Zindaggi Kii	Jamshed Sherier	

=== Web series ===
Year	Title	Role	Channel
2021	Qubool Hai 2.0	Asad's coach	ZEE5
2022	Escaype Live	Yogi Balla	Disney+ Hotstar
2023	Rana Naidu	Farzad Soonawala	Netflix

== Dubbing roles ==
=== Live action films ===
Film title	Actor	Character	Dub language	Original language	Original year release	Dub year release	Notes
Billy Madison	Adam Sandler	Billy Madison	Hindi	English	1995	2005	
Big Daddy	Adam Sandler	Sonny Koufax	Hindi	English	1999	2006	
Mr. Deeds	Adam Sandler	Longfellow Deeds	Hindi	English	2002	2006	
House of Flying Daggers	Takeshi Kaneshiro	Jin	Hindi	Mandarin Chinese	2004	2005	
50 First Dates	Adam Sandler	Henry Roth	Hindi	English	2004	2005	
Click	Adam Sandler	Michael Newman	Hindi	English	2006	2006	
Honeymoon Travels Pvt. Ltd.	Vikram Chatwal	Bunty	Hindi	English; Hindi	2007	2007	Ashwin was called in to dub the dialogues during post-production because of the dissatisfaction of the director with the lines spoken by the actor. Vikram was unable to convey his lines properly due to temporary health problems, despite that the movie was already shot in Hindi as one of the languages.
Reign Over Me	Adam Sandler	Charlie Fineman	Hindi	English	2007	2007	
The Warlords	Takeshi Kaneshiro	Jiang Wuyang	Hindi	Mandarin Chinese	2007	2007	
You Don't Mess with the Zohan	Adam Sandler	Zohan Dvir	Hindi	English	2008	2008	
Red Cliff	Takeshi Kaneshiro	Zhuge Liang	Hindi	Mandarin Chinese	2008 (Part 1); 2009 (Part 2)	2008 (Part 1); 2009 (Part 2)	
Night at the Museum: Battle of the Smithsonian	Alain Chabat	Napoleon Bonaparte	Hindi	English	2009	2009	
Grown Ups	Adam Sandler	Lenny Feder	Hindi	English	2010	2010	
Jack and Jill	Adam Sandler	Jack/Jill Sadelstein	Hindi	English	2011	2011	
Just Go with It	Adam Sandler	Dr. Daniel "Danny" Maccabee	Hindi	English	2011	2011	
Dragon	Takeshi Kaneshiro	Xu Baijiu	Hindi	Mandarin and Sichuanese (CN/TW); Cantonese Chinese (HK)	2011	2011	
X-Men: Apocalypse	Michael Fassbender	Erik Lensherr / Magneto	Hindi	English	2016	2016	
Assassin's Creed	Michael Fassbender	Callum "Cal" Lynch and Aguilar de Nerha	Hindi	English	2016	2016	
American Hustle	Christian Bale	Irving Rosenfeld	Hindi	English	2013	2018	
Transformers: Age of Extinction	Stanley Tucci	Joshua Joyce	Hindi	English	2014	2014	

=== Animated films ===
Film title	Original voice	Character	Dub language	Original language	Original year release	Dub year release	Notes
Shrek the Third	Conrad Vernon	Rumpelstiltskin	Hindi	English	2007	2007	

=== Live action television series ===
Program Title	Actor	Character	Dub Language	Original language	Number of episodes	Original airdate	Dubbed airdate	Notes
Sacred Games	Saif Ali Khan	Sartaj Singh	English	Hindi	16			India's first web-series Streamed on Netflix
Money Heist	Álvaro Morte	Sergio Marquina / Professor	Hindi	Spanish		2017	2021	
Citadel	Stanley Tucci	Bernard Orlick	Hindi	English		2023	2023	
