= Hola Venky! =

Indian English-language independent romantic comedy film

- Poster
- Directed by: Sandeep Mohan
- Written by: Sandeep Mohan
- Produced by: Sandeep Mohan
- Starring: Roger Narayan; Sonia Balcazar; Giju John; Ashwin Mushran; Ramanathan Seshan
- Production company: Crawling Angel Films
- Release date: 25 January 2014 (San Jose)
- Running time: 85 Minutes
- Country: India
- Language: English
- Budget: ₹10 lakh

Hola Venky! (transl. Hi Venky!) is a 2014 Indian English-language independent romantic comedy film written and directed by Sandeep Mohan. The film stars Roger Narayan, Sonia Balcazar, and Ashwin Mushran. Shot on a micro-budget of ₹10 lakh with a four-member crew, it explores the quirky journey of a techie in San Francisco, blending slapstick humor with an Indian-Mexican cultural flavor.

== Plot ==
Hola Venky! follows Venky, a techie who embarks on a comedic journey in San Francisco, blending slapstick humor with natural acting. The film is noted for its quirky situations and exploration of life experiences.

== Cast ==
- Roger Narayan as Venky
- Sonia Balcazar as Inez
- Giju John as Kurian
- Ashwin Mushran as Psychiatrist
- Ramanathan Seshan as Bharatwaj

== Production ==
Hola Venky! was produced on a shoestring budget of ₹10 lakh, with Sandeep Mohan taking on multiple roles as writer, director, and actor. He positioned the film as an accessible model for aspiring filmmakers.

== Release ==
Eschewing traditional theatrical release, Sandeep Mohan traveled across India to screen Hola Venky! directly for audiences, an approach described as bringing "cinema to doorsteps." This method contributed to discussions on alternative distribution for indie films in India. The film was also slated for an online release to reach a wider audience. The Hindu termed this mobility "movie on the move."

== Reception ==
Critical reception to Hola Venky! was mixed. Live Mint’s Nandini Ramnath praised its simplicity but found it unexceptional. Bangalore Mirror rated it 3 out of 5 stars, lauding its humor while pointing out narrative flaws. Mail Today's Vinayak Chakravorty hailed it as a "refreshing indie effort," particularly for its release strategy.
