= Shreelancer =

Indian indie drama film

- Theatrical release poster
- Directed by: Sandeep Mohan
- Written by: Sandeep Mohan
- Produced by: Giju John; Sandeep Mohan
- Starring: Arjun Radhakrishnan
- Edited by: Shreyas Beltangdy
- Music by: Score: Vivek Philip; Songs: Andrew Sloman; Natalie Matos; Ankur Tewari; Prateek Kuhad
- Production companies: Tiranga Pictures; The Great Indian Travelling Cinema
- Release dates: 8 August 2017 (New York Indian Film Festival); 18 August 2017 (India)
- Country: India
- Languages: Hindi; English

Shreelancer (stylised as #shreelancer) (Note: The film's title is a portmanteau of Shree (the titular character) and freelancer.) is a 2017 Indian indie drama film directed by Sandeep Mohan starring Arjun Radhakrishnan in the titular role.

== Cast ==
- Arjun Radhakrishnan as Shreepad "Shree" Naik
- Salmin Sheriff as Mr. Naik, Shree's father
- Monica Mahendru

== Music ==
The film features the song "Dil Beparvah" by Ankur Tewari and Prateek Kuhad and other songs by Andrew Sloman and Natalie Matos.

== Reception ==
Nihit Bhave of The Times of India rated the film 2.5/5 and wrote, "Shreelancer feels like a promising assignment that started out great but succumbed to a fast-approaching deadline. Let’s wait for the projects that its capable men (Radhakrishnan and Mohan) are more invested in". Namrata Joshi of The Hindu wrote, "For the pragmatic workers on regular jobs the film might seem like an indulgent paean to the forever uprooted. But one has to admit that more than anything else what a (Shree) freelancer’s life has, as the film showcases, is a great soundtrack".

Rahul Desai of Film Companion wrote, "It's the calm reaction of a fiercely independent storyteller (this is director Sandeep Mohan's third full-fledged feature) to the increasingly commercial and designed language of the genre he has chosen to explore". Nandini Ramnath of Scroll.in wrote, "All of Mohan’s films turn on smart ideas about unexplored urban realities, but Shreepad’s journey is not half as interesting as he imagines it to be. Like its aimless hero, the movie drifts in far too many directions". A critic from IANS rated the film 2.5/5 and wrote, "Overall, this film, with a feel-good approach, surely surpasses one's expectations".
