= Shikhar (2005 film) =

2005 Indian film by John Matthew Matthan

- Theatrical release poster
- Directed by: John Matthew Matthan
- Written by: Abbas Tyrewala; John Matthew Matthan
- Produced by: John Matthew Matthan
- Starring: Ajay Devgn; Bipasha Basu; Shahid Kapoor; Amrita Rao
- Cinematography: A. K. Bir
- Edited by: Ajoy Varma
- Music by: Viju Shah
- Production company: Cinematt Pictures
- Release date: 30 December 2005
- Running time: 162 minutes
- Country: India
- Language: Hindi
- Budget: ₹14 crore (Note: Budget figure includes print and advertising costs)
- Box office: ₹10.3 crore

Shikhar (transl. Peak) is a 2005 Indian Hindi-language drama film produced and directed by John Matthew Matthan. The film stars Ajay Devgn, Bipasha Basu, Shahid Kapoor and Amrita Rao in lead roles, while Manoj Joshi, Javed Sheikh, and Sushant Singh play supporting roles. The music was composed by Viju Shah with cinematography and editing handled by A. K. Bir and Ajoy Varma respectively. The film was released on 30 December 2005. The film also serves as the 3rd film collaboration with actors Shahid Kapoor and Amrita Rao together.

Loosely inspired by The Fountainhead by Ayn Rand, The film revolves around an overambitious businessman (played by Devgn) who tricks a naive boy (played by Kapoor) in order to sell his land to him to build his tower projects.

== Plot ==
The story is about Gaurav Gupta, a successful businessman who started with nothing and believes that only money can fuel his ambitions. When he interests himself in building a town in an abandoned village, he makes his mind up and agrees to build it at any cost, with the support of crooked politician Amrit Patil. However, the owner of the land, Shrikant Vardhan, does not accept the town to be built. Therefore, Gaurav tricks Shrikant's son Jaidev, who is infected by the get-rich-quick virus, to join his scheme.

Jaidev, while respecting his father's philosophy, falls hook line, and sinker for Gaurav's gilt-edged dreams. Madhavi, the lover and friend of Jaidev, can only watch as Jaidev starts to go against his father's morals, by drinking and smoking. Gaurav uses his girlfriend Natasha to charm Jaidev by pretending to be in love with him so that he supports them instead of his own father. Meanwhile, Shrikant hopes that his son will return to his roots. Gaurav and Natasha even trick him by pretending to be a construction/ad agency partnered with actor John Abraham. Jaidev falls for the plan, with Gaurav blackmailing him along the way. Soon after learning about Gaurav's plan, Jaidev tries to stop him, but he is attacked in the process. Madhavi helps Jaidev with his wounds, and Jaidev realizes his mistakes, apologizes to his father, and tries to fight against Gaurav. After learning this, a furious Gaurav sets the land on fire, but Jaidev eventually saves the land and the hostages. Soon, Gaurav and Amrit are arrested for their crimes, and the village land is saved. Jaidev reconciles with his father and Madhavi, and starts to help the latter in his business.

== Cast ==
- Ajay Devgan as Gaurav Gupta (GG)
- Bipasha Basu as Natasha
- Shahid Kapoor as Jaidev S. Vardhan (Jai)
- Amrita Rao as Madhavi
- Manoj Joshi as Amrit Patil
- Sunil Rege as Chief Minister
- Javed Sheikh as Srikant Vardhan
- Sushant Singh as Bhajanlal
- Akhil Mishra as Jadhav
- Akhilendra Mishra as Irfan Bhai
- Farha Naaz as Kusum
- Ash Chandler as Ashton Raga
- Jaywant Wadkar as Gaurav's henchman
- Raj Zutshi as himself (cameo appearance)
- John Abraham as himself (cameo appearance)

== Soundtrack ==
Shikhar

Soundtrack album by Viju Shah
- Released: 21 November 2005
- Genre: Feature film soundtrack
- Label: T-Series

The film's soundtrack is composed by Viju Shah with lyrics written by Sudhakar Sharma, Anita Sarkar, Chandrashekhar Rajit and Manohar Iyer.

=== Track list ===
| Track # | Song | Singer(s) | Composer | Lyricist | Duration |
|---|---|---|---|---|---|
| 1 | "Fitna Dil" | Sunidhi Chauhan, Udit Narayan & KK | Viju Shah | Chandreshekhar Rajit | 6:43 |
| 2 | "Aap Ko Samjha" | Udit Narayan & Sadhana Sargam | Viju Shah | Sudhakar Sharma | 5:35 |
| 3 | "Dheere Dheere" | KK | Viju Shah | Manohar Iyer | 4:08 |
| 4 | "Megha Re Megha" | Udit Narayan & Alka Yagnik | Viju Shah | Sudhakar Sharma | 5:28 |
| 5 | "Mere Mann" | Alka Yagnik & Udit Narayan | Viju Shah | Sudhakar Sharma | 4:13 |
| 6 | "Tu Hai Shikar" | Jagjit Singh | Viju Shah | Sudhakar Sharma | 3:54 |
| 7 | "Vaga" | Ash Chandler | Viju Shah | Anita Sarkar | 3:01 |
| 8 | "Fitna Dil (Remix)" | Sunidhi Chauhan, Udit Narayan & KK | Viju Shah | Chandreshekhar Rajit | 4:48 |

== Reception ==
Taran Adarsh of IndiaFM gave them 1.5 out of 5, writing, "On the whole, SHIKHAR disappoints big time." Sukanya Verma of Rediff.com wrote, "Directed by John M Matthan, Shikhar is not nearly a flattering tribute. It borrows the essential structure of Wall Street while raising its own propaganda against the issue of deforestation at the hands of penny-pinching builders. Alas, what could have been a classic duel between avarice and virtue becomes an inconsistent battle of obstinacy with denseness."
