= Ash Chandler =

Indian actor, comedian, and singer

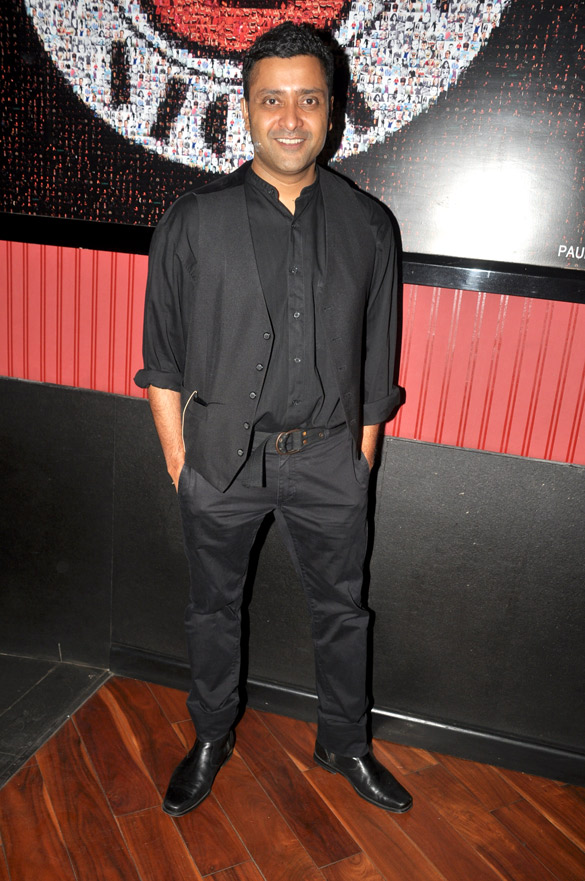
- Ash Chandler in 2012
- Occupations: Standup comedian; actor; singer
- Years active: 1998–present
- Spouse: Neetha Raghuraman

Ash Chandler is an Indian actor, comedian, and singer who has appeared in predominantly English and Hindi-language films and television series. He is known for his stand-up comedy.

== Career ==
Ash came to India in 1999 and eventually became known for his stand-up comedy.

== Selected filmography ==
Year	Film	Role	Notes
1998	Fis Mol	Angry Cigar Man	
2001	Auroville 316		
2001	Little John	Kumar	Simultaneously shot in Tamil
2002	Mitr, My Friend	—N/a	Dubbing artist
2005	Shikhar	Ashton Raga	Also singer for "Vaga"
2006	My Bollywood Bride	Priyad	
2006	Mixed Doubles	Harsh	
2010	Guzaarish	Yasser Siddiqui	
2011	Love, Wrinkle-free	Savio Monteiro	

=== Television ===
Year	Title	Role	Notes
1997	Premi	Inspector Ashwin	Tamil series
	ER		1 episode
2006	The Man's World Show	Host	
2009	Greek	Band singer	1 episode: "Fight the Power"
2013	2nd South Indian International Movie Awards	Host	
