= Roger Narayan =

Indian Kannada film actor

- Born: Raj Narayan
- Occupation: Actor
- Years active: 1985–1993; 2006–present

Raj Narayan is an actor who works in predominantly Kannada and English-language films. He is known for playing the titular role in Hola Venky! and starring in U Turn (2016).

== Career ==
Roger Narayan studied engineering at BITS Pilani before deciding to pursue his passion of becoming an actor. He subsequently learned acting in several institutions. He changed his stage name from Raj to Roger so that he would not be cast in stereotypical Indian roles. He started off as a child artist in Kannada films before played supporting roles in several English films and television shows before debuting as a lead actor with the quirky Indian English film Hola Venky! (2014), which was shot in India. He garnered recognition for his role in the Kannada film U Turn (2016) as a sub-inspector of police. He played the role of an iyengar in The Man Who Knew Infinity (2015) and starred in 417 Miles, another multilingual venture. He starred in Humble Politician Nograj (2018) as a NRI politician. In a review of the film, a critic noted that "Roger Narayan is a perfect fit as Arun Patil". Roger Narayan made his debut as an antagonist in the Kannada film Chambal (2019).

== Partial filmography ==
Year	Film	Role	Language	Notes
1985	Jeevana Chakra	Krishna	Kannada	Child actor
1988	Sangliyana	Kumar	Kannada	Child actor
1993	Aakasmika	Raja	Kannada	Child actor
2010	Keeping Up with the Guptas	Kumar	English	
2011	Happy Feet Two	Indian penguin	English	voice role
2012	The Test	Marcus	English	
2014	Hola Venky!	Venky	English	
2015	The Man Who Knew Infinity	Iyengar	English	
2016	U Turn	Nayak	Kannada	
2016	417 Miles	Srinivas	English	
2017	Vismaya	—N/a	Kannada	Lyricist for "Kaaki Shirt-Ina"
2018	Humble Politician Nograj	Arun Patil	Kannada	
2019	Chambal		Kannada	
2019	Punyakoti	Kalinga	Sanskrit	voice role
2022	DNA	Akash	Kannada	
2023	Diamond Cross		Kannada	
2025	The Devil		Kannada	

=== Television ===
- All television shows are in English, unless otherwise noted.

Year	Title	Role	Notes
2009	House	Pundit	Episode "Simple Explanation"
2009	Better Off Ted	Jim	Episode "Goodbye, Mr. Chips"
2009	The Young and the Restless	Novich	3 episodes (season 1)
2010	Miami Medical	Mukesh	Episodes "Pilot" and "88 Seconds" of season 1 (Note: While his role in the episode "Pilot" is credited, his role in the episode "88 Seconds" is not credited.)
2010	How I Met Your Mother	Babaka	Episode "Blitzgiving"
2010	Victorious	Dr. Bornstein	Episode "Rex Dies"
2012	Weeds	Bandhi	2 episodes
2012	Incredible Crew	Mr. Narayan	Episode "Pancake Genie"
2014	NCIS: Los Angeles	Roger Ali	Episode "Allegiance"
2015	The Leftovers	Bhagat	Episode "A Matter of Geography"

== Awards and nominations ==
Year	Award	Category	Work	Outcome	Ref.
2017	64th Filmfare Awards South	Best Supporting Actor	U Turn	Nominated	
2018	6th South Indian International Movie Awards	Best Debut Actor	U Turn	Nominated	
2019	8th South Indian International Movie Awards	Best Actor In A Supporting Role	Humble Politician Nograj	Nominated	
