= Shernaz Patel =

Indian film and theatre actor

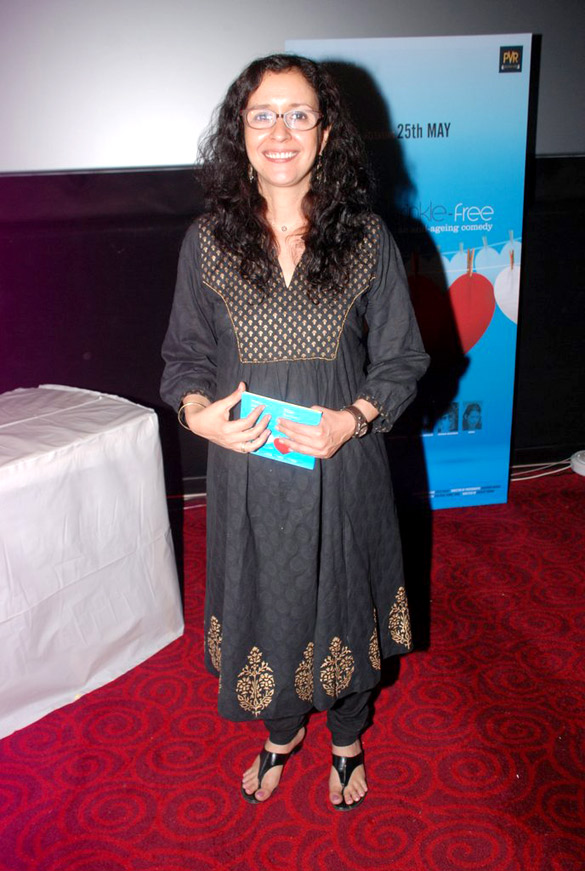
- Shernaz Patel at the audio release of Love, Wrinkle-free
- Born: Mumbai
- Education: Royal Conservatoire of Scotland
- Occupation: Actor
- Years active: 1984–present

Shernaz Patel is an Indian film and theatre actress, who works in Hindi and English films, most known for her roles in films like Black (2005) and Guzaarish (2010) and English language theatre in Mumbai. She made her theatre debut with The Diary Of Anne Frank in 1984. Since then, she has acted in several noted productions in Mumbai-based English theatre, and formed RAGE theatre group in Mumbai, with Rahul da Cunha and Rajit Kapur in 1993. She has also given voice to the character of Yashoda in the TV series Little Krishna.

== Early life and education ==
Born in Mumbai, Shernaz is the daughter of Parsi stage veterans Ruby and Burjor Patel and grew up in a theatre environment. She did her schooling at Fort Convent school, where she participated in plays directed by Pearl Padamsee. She graduated from the Elphinstone College, University of Mumbai. Subsequently, she did her master's degree in acting from the Royal Scottish Academy of Music and Drama.

== Career ==
She made her film debut with Mahesh Bhatt's TV film Janam (1986) alongside Kumar Gaurav. In 1992, she performed the lead in the English play, Love Letters for the first time, along with Rajit Kapoor, under the direction of Rahul da Cunha. The play is still being performed.

In 2008 she returned to soap operas after 23 years of filming in various movies.

In 2009, she acted in screenwriter and Mira Nair's long-time collaborator Sooni Taraporevala's directorial debut film, Little Zizou. In 2011 she appeared in Rockstar. In 2012, she appeared in Reema Kagti's suspense-drama Talaash.

In 2014 she performed at the Times Noida festival along with other actors such as Rajit Kapur and Neil Bhoopalam.

In 2015 she acted in a YouTube mini-series by YashRaj Films called "Bang Baaja Baaraat" along with Ali Fazal, Angira Dhar, Gajraj Rao, Rajit Kapur, Ayesha Raza, Neil Bhoopalam, Preetika Chawla and Priyanshu Painyuli.

In 2016 she was seen in season finale of TVF Tripling, portraying the role of mother of the siblings.

She also narrated J. R. D. Tata's biography by Charkha Audiobooks, Beyond the Last Blue Mountain written by R. M. Lala alongside Boman Irani who provided the voice of J. R. D. Tata.

== Filmography ==
- Khandaan (1985)
- Janam (1986)
- Black (2005)
- Home Delivery (2005)
- Family — Ties of Blood (2006)
- Humko Deewana Kar Gaye (2006)
- Dum Kaata (2007)
- Big Brother (2007)
- Dhan Dhana Dhan Goal (2007)
- Little Zizou (2009)
- The President Is Coming (2009) (English)
- Kalpavriksha
- Hum Tum Aur Ghost (2010)
- Lamhaa (2010)
- Guzaarish (2010)
- O Maria (2010) (Konkani)
- I Am (2011)
- Rockstar (2011)
- Love, Wrinkle-free (2012) (English)
- Talaash (2012) – Frenny
- Gandhi of the Month (2012) Post-production
- Kalpvriksh (2012)
- Aatma (2013)
- John Day (2013)
- Gandhi of the Month (2014)
- Roy (2015)
- Azhar (2016)
- The Black Cat (2017)
- 36 Days 2024
- Shekhar Home 2024
- Bokshi 2026

== Dubbing roles ==
=== Live action films ===
Film title	Actor(s)	Character	Dub Language	Original Language	Original Year Release	Dub Year Release	Notes
Doctor Strange	Tilda Swinton	The Ancient One	Hindi	English	2016	2016	
Avengers: Endgame	Tilda Swinton	The Ancient One	Hindi	English	2019	2019	

=== Animated films ===
Film title	Original Voice(s)	Character	Dub Language	Original Language	Original Year Release	Dub Year Release	Notes
How to Train Your Dragon 2	Cate Blanchett	Valka	Hindi	English	2014	2014	
How to Train Your Dragon: The Hidden World	Cate Blanchett	Valka	Hindi	English	2019	2019	
The Lion King	Alfre Woodard	Sarabi	Hindi	English	2019	2019	

=== Television/Web series ===
Title	Actor(s)	Character	Dub Language	Original Language	Original Year Release	Dub Year Release	Notes
The Falcon and the Winter Soldier	Amy Aquino	Christina Raynor	Hindi	English	2021	2021	

== Awards ==
- 2011 Star Screen Award for Best Supporting Actress – Guzaarish
- 2023 Best Supporting Actress Comedy series at 2023 Filmfare OTT Awards - TVF Tripling (season 3)
