= Love, Wrinkle-free =

- Directed by: Sandeep Mohan
- Written by: Sandeep Mohan
- Produced by: Giju John; Kamal Shah
- Starring: Ash Chandler; Shernaz Patel
- Cinematography: Binendra Menon
- Edited by: Shreyas Beltangdy
- Release date: 25 May 2012
- Running time: 107 minutes
- Country: India
- Language: English

Love, Wrinkle-free (stylised as love, wrinkle-free) is a 2012 Indian English-language indie adult romantic film directed by Sandeep Mohan starring Ash Chandler and Shernaz Patel.

== Cast ==
- Ash Chandler as Savio Monteiro
- Shernaz Patel as Annie
- Seema Rahmani as Natalie
- Sohrab Ardeshir as Bruno Corrieo
- Ashwin Mushran as Jacob
- Theron C. as Rajiv Bhatia
- Arika Silaichia as Ruth
- Dasang Tensing as Tashi
- Francisco Sousa
- Marianne Borgo as Valerie (special appearance)
- Giju John as Cleetez D'Cruz (special appearance)
- Arika Silaichia as Ruth Monteiro
- Guneet Monga as Florence Monga
- Ankush Batra as Kaladhar

== Release ==
The film was showcased at several film festivals including Mumbai International Film Festival, Cinequest Film Festival in San Jose and South Asian International Film Festival. The Times of India gave the film a rating of three out of five stars and stated that "It’s simple, pure, and breaks cosmetic clichés - that’s the beauty. But halfway through the film, the wrinkles steep deeper, in the script that is". Hindustan Times gave the film a review of two-and-a-half stars and stated that "Love, Wrinkle-Free is one of those films that mix charm and tedium in equal doses". Bollywood Life wrote that "Best thing about LWF is that it is not gimmicky and everything about the film is real".
