= Shivajith =

Indian actor from Kerala

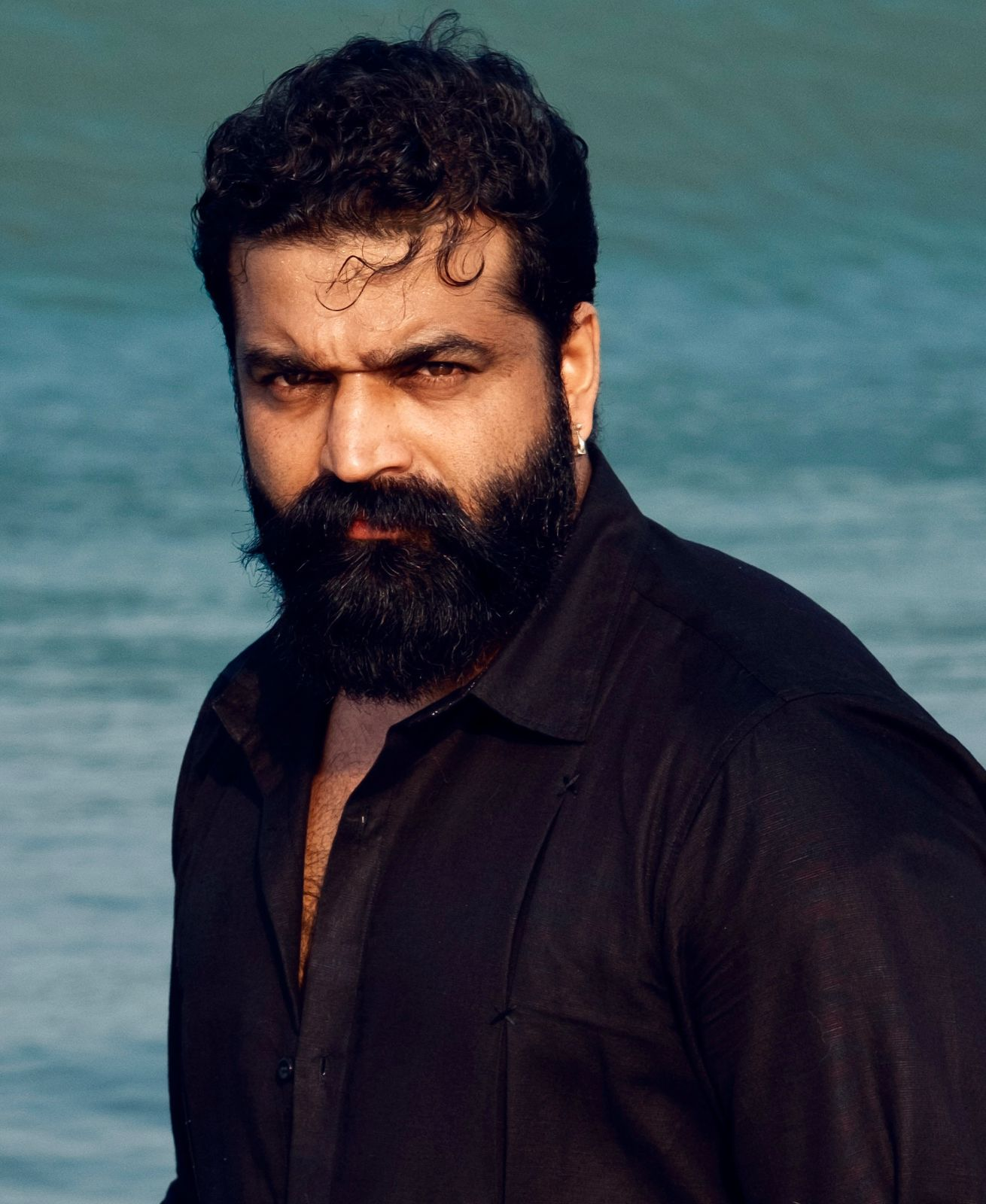
- Born: Kannur, Kerala, India
- Occupations: Actor; Model
- Years active: 2016–present
- Parents: Padmanabhan; M. R. Madanavalli

Shivajith is an Indian actor who works primarily in South Indian cinema.

== Early life ==
Shivajith was born in Thalavil, a village in the Kannur district of Kerala, India, to Padmanabhan and M. R. Madanavalli. He has a younger sister, Shijina Padmanabhan.

From childhood, he trained in Kathakali, Bharatanatyam and Kuchipudi, and learned to play the mridangam. He won the title of "Kalaprathibha" at the Kerala State Youth Festival (now the Kerala School Kalolsavam) in both 1998 and 1999, a consecutive win that set a new record at the event.

== Career ==
=== Debut and breakthrough ===
Shivajith's route into acting was a long one; a 2017 Mathrubhumi profile described roughly fourteen years of trying to break into the industry before he was cast. He made his acting debut in Jayaraj's period action drama Veeram (2016), playing the warrior Aromal Chekavar opposite Kunal Kapoor. To prepare, he trained for two years in kalaripayattu, Kerala's traditional martial art, and his command of the form was widely noted as one of the film's strengths. A supporting role followed in Ranam (2018), but no major part came immediately after.

His breakthrough arrived with Kalki (2019), in which he played Amarnath, the antagonist opposite Tovino Thomas. According to Shivajith, he pursued the part directly after seeing a casting call posted to Tovino Thomas's Instagram account, contacting the film's producer, Prashob Krishna - a former college junior of his - and putting himself forward for the role. The performance drew significant attention from critics and audiences and established him as a recognisable screen villain in Malayalam cinema.

=== Later career ===
Since Kalki, Shivajith has worked steadily across Malayalam cinema, including Backpackers (2020), Kurup (2021) and Kumari (2022). He subsequently expanded beyond Malayalam-language cinema, making his Tamil-language debut in Rudhran (2023) and his Telugu-language debut in The Volunteer (2025). His more recent credits include Once Upon a Time in Kochi (2024), ARM-Ajayante Randam Moshanam (2024), Pravinkoodu Shappu (2025), a dual role in Dominic Arun's Lokah Chapter 1: Chandra (2025), and Pennu Case (2026).

== Filmography ==
Year	Title	Role	Languages	Notes
2016	Veeram	Aromal Chekavar	Malayalam, Hindi, English	Debut film
2018	Ranam	Rajan Nambiar	Malayalam	
2019	Kalki	Amarnath	Malayalam	
2020	Backpackers	Kattoor Jolly	Malayalam	
2021	Kurup	Sabu	Malayalam	
2022	Kumari	Thuppan Thamburan	Malayalam	
2023	Rudhran	Sashi	Tamil	Tamil debut
2024	Once Upon a Time in Kochi	Vinod	Malayalam	
2024	ARM	Kavumbayi Sudhakaran	Malayalam	
2025	Pravinkoodu Shappu	Komban Babu	Malayalam	
2025	The Volunteer	Unknown	Telugu	
2025	Lokah Chapter 1: Chandra	King Senapathy and Gajendran	Malayalam	
2026	Pennu Case	David	Malayalam	
2026	Khalifa: The Ruler	Vinayakan	Malayalam	
