= Thakarachenda =

- Directed by: Avira Rebecca
- Written by: Walter; Avira Rebecca
- Produced by: Noushad; Xavi Mano Mathew
- Starring: Sreenivasan; Geetu Mohandas; Seema G. Nair; Manikandan Pattambi
- Cinematography: M. J. Radhakrishnan
- Music by: Paris Chandran (background score); Siby Kuruvilla (songs)
- Release date: 9 August 2007
- Country: India
- Language: Malayalam

Thakarachenda is a 2007 Indian Malayalam-language film directed by debutant Avira Rebecca with Sreenivasan and Geetu Mohandas in the lead. The film is based on a real-life incident. The film was released on 9 August 2007, along with Shaji N. Karun's docu-fiction AKG.

A drama by genre, the film is an example of black humour and sarcastic comments. It received the Best Debut Director Award and Special Jury Award (Sreenivasan) at the Kerala State Film Awards.

== Cast ==
- Sreenivasan as Chakrapani
- Geetu Mohandas as Latha
- Seema G. Nair as Vasanthi
- Manikandan Pattambi as Suni
