= Kumari (2022 film) =

Indian fantasy horror film directed by Nirmal Sahadev

- Theatrical release poster
- Directed by: Nirmal Sahadev
- Written by: Nirmal Sahadev; Fazal Hameed
- Produced by: Giju John; Nirmal Sahadev; Sreejith Sarang; Jakes Bejoy; Aishwarya Lekshmi
- Starring: Aishwarya Lekshmi; Shine Tom Chacko
- Narrated by: Prithviraj Sukumaran
- Cinematography: Abraham Joseph
- Edited by: Sreejith Sarang
- Music by: Songs: Jakes Bejoy; Manikandan Ayyappa; Score: Jakes Bejoy
- Production company: The Fresh Lime Sodas
- Distributed by: Magic Frames; Prithviraj Productions
- Release date: 28 October 2022
- Running time: 137 minutes
- Country: India
- Language: Malayalam

Kumari (transl. Young woman) is a 2022 Indian Malayalam-language fantasy folk horror film written, directed, and co-produced by Nirmal Sahadev. It stars Aishwarya Lekshmi in title role, with Shine Tom Chacko and Surabhi Lakshmi in supporting roles. The film is produced by Giju John, Nirmal Sahadev, Sreejith Sarang and Jakes Bejoy under the banner of The Fresh Lime Sodas. Abraham Joseph is the cinematographer of the film, while Jakes Bejoy composed the soundtrack. Kumari was co-produced by Aishwarya Lekshmi, Priyanka Joseph and Mridhula Pinapala.

== Plot ==
The movie starts with a grandmother narrating to her grandchild a story about a goddess that had visited the earth. Becoming fascinated by the beauty of planet, she did not return to her abode, and married a mortal man and had two children named Chathan and Gari Devan, who neither looked like gods nor humans and possessed enormous powers. They fought amongst themselves and destroyed the planet forcing the goddess to restrain Chathan to the mountains and Gari Devan under the land, before returning to her abode. Human beings then start worshipping them, knowing that they are very powerful and can be used for the betterment of mankind.

The movie then shifts to a village, where the conservative landlord Thuppan undervalues people from low-caste and was known to be very cruel. Chokkan was a young orphan, who unbeknownst to everyone often met Chathan and gave him food in exchange for gems. Thuppan's generous wife Nangakutty was fond of Chokkan and often conversed with him. One day, while Chokkan was conversing with Nangakutty, he forgets the mangoes that he fetched and Nangakutty, unbeknownst to anyone, eats the mangoes which was considered a sin by the landlord as he considers them outcasts. Later, while Nangakutty was serving food to Thuppan, he notices the smell of mangoes coming from Nangakutty and realizes she ate mangoes from the forest and that she had used them to cook food which she had given to Thuppan. The agitated Thuppan who was feeling impure, went to have a bath in the family pond to purify himself. Finding Chokkan having a bath at the pond, a furious Thuppan admonished him and eventually killed him using a rock. Angered, Chathan cursed the village causing a rain of rocks and deadly disease, with which Thuppan got infected. To get rid of the curse and protect his clan and people, Thuppan decided to invite Gari Devan.

After twelve generations, Kumari, an orphan raised by her uncles and her brother Jayan, marries Dhruvan, a mentally ill person and Thuppan's descendant despite receiving opposition from Jayan, for her uncles. Kumari is attracted towards the forest by Chokkan but she is desisted by her co-sister Lakshmi, Dhruvan's brother Achyuthan's wife, who discloses that their family is not supposed to enter the forest, having earned the wrath of Chathan. She also reveals that Thuppan had sought the protection of Gari Devan against the curse imposed on the family by Chathan. Later, Kumari confronts Dhruvan when she witnessed his uncle Velyachan and brother Achyuthan mistreat him and he reveals that he was ignored in favor of his brother, causing him to be his own companion and people started to believe that he was mentally unwell. He also revealed that he killed his teacher for beating him mercilessly with a cane for watching a dance performance by skipping his lessons. Kumari realizes that what Dhruvan needs is love and affection and begins to care for him. Achyuthan meanwhile engages in an extra-marital affair with a woman named Parijatham, who provokes him to seek authority over the village.

Kumari, chasing Chokkan who fascinated her, enters the forest and meets a woman called Muthamma who tells Kumari that the latter is carrying a child, who would be in danger because of Dhruvan and asks her to come meet her across the river and that she would take her to Chathan, who would protect the child. Kumari, horrified returns home and later, her pregnancy is confirmed. Kumari gets stressed over the fact that no one in the family except for Dhruvan seem happy about her pregnancy. Dhruvan begins to hold desires for power over the village as its lord and Kumari catches him cutting his two fingers to resemble Gari Devan. Achyuthan mocks him over it and a fight erupts between them but Velyachan intervenes and declares that Dhruvan would be the next landlord as he is the first one of the next generation delivering an heir. Lakshmi later divulges to Kumari that she intentionally didn't bear children for a reason. Twelve generations ago, after Thuppan invites Gary Devan, the former had sacrificed his own son to Gari Devan for appeasing him despite Nangakutty's protests which caused her to commit suicide. The sacrifice of Thuppan's son and Gari Devan's protection for the family only lasts for twelve generations and it was Dhruvan's turn as the lord of the twelfth generation to sacrifice his child which is why the women were not happy over Kumari's pregnancy. Terrified, Kumari expresses to Lakshmi that Dhruvan would never do such a thing but Lakshmi tells her that the family's men would go to any extent to uphold their power and traditions. Lakshmi also reveals to Kumari that Thuppan has been alive for the last twelve generations rotting in the attic for his sins. Velyachan witnesses Lakshmi telling everything to Kumari. The next morning, Lakshmi is found dead in the well, indicating that Velyachan killed her.

Devastated, Kumari crosses the river and visits Muthamma's community that pray to Chathan and Muthamma takes her to Chathan, who promises to protect Kumari's child. She is given a small thing to be buried in her house and a few incantations to be read. Velyachan begins to train Dhruvan for engaging in the next sacrifice while Parijatham instigates Achyuthan to visit Chathan and seek power but he gets killed by Chathan. At the same time, Velyachan also dies due to a snake bite and Dhruvan takes his position as the next lord. Chathan's curse begins to haunt the village for the second time, repeating the history. After a fire erupts in their house, Dhruvan gets convinced that someone is conspiring against him and has taken Chathan's side and goes into the forest along with his henchmen. He beats up Chathan's worshippers but is forced by his henchmen to return when Chathan's arrival is signalled by the nature. Angered by his violence and concerned for her people, Muthamma reveals that Kumari is the one conspiring against him to protect her child. Dhruvan confronts Kumari and justifies that it would be his responsibility to kill his child for the village and confines her to a room. Kumari's brother Jayan visits her to take her away and assaults Dhruvan in the fields for mistreating Kumari but Dhruvan murders him leaving Kumari distraught. With no other option, Kumari meets Thuppan, who blames himself for all the miseries that he has caused and asks her to pray to the goddess, previously worshipped by Nangakutty, whom he had ignored for approaching Gari Devan. She finds the idol of the goddess along with a dagger that she had seen previously in her nightmares.

Kumari eventually gives birth to a healthy boy and tries to escape with her baby but Dhruvan ambushes her and takes the child for sacrifice. He calls Gari Devan to accept the sacrifice but Kumari comes back and fights Dhruvan and Gari Devan with the dagger from the goddess idol. On the other side, in the forest, Muthamma and her people invoke Chathan with their loud prayers. In response to all this, Chathan arrives and fights against Gari Devan to uphold his promise to Kumari and finish the fight that he had started long ago. Chathan cuts off Gari Devan's tongue while Kumari reluctantly kills Dhruvan and saves her baby. One is still unsure whether Gari Devan is alive (being a demi-god) or dead.

A few years later, Kumari is now looking over the village as the landlady. Unlike the men in her family, she is more humane and understanding. Kumari's son finds Chokkan standing in the forest and tries to go to him, indicating that he will be Chathan's next friend.

== Cast ==
- Aishwarya Lekshmi as Kumari
- Shine Tom Chacko as Kaanhirangat Dhruvan Thampuran
- Swasika as Lakshmi
- Surabhi Lakshmi as Muthamma
- Spadikam George as Kaanhirangaat Vellyachan Thampuran
- Shivajith as Kaanchirangat Thuppan Thampuran
- Giju John as Kaanhirangaat Achuthan
- Tanvi Ram as Nangakutty Amma
- Shruthy Menon as Parijatham
- Rahul Madhav as Jayan Devan
- Santhakumari as Kunjamma

== Release ==
The film opened in theaters in Kerala on 28 October 2022 and was released on Netflix on 18 November 2022.

== Reception ==
Cinema Express writes Kumari is powered by a heavily folklore-influenced narrative that bears elements of a gothic horror story or a monster feature, Kumari is one of those films with all its departments well-balanced. The New Indian Express writes the most impressive aspect of Kumari is its visual texture heavy with ominous foreboding.

A critic from The Hindu wrote that "Director Nirmal Sahadev, who debuted with Ranam, an action drama set in Detroit, has improved his game marginally, but a shallow script pulls Kumari down". A critic from onManorama said that "The plot, however, is stuck in a rulebook of the genre, if there is one. The characters' tension doesn't convey to the audience. The narrative flows in a rather predictable manner, leaving little moments of thrill and fear".

== Music ==
The music was composed by Jakes Bejoy and one song composed by Manikandan Ayyappa who also co-composed the background score with Jakes.

Kumari (Original Motion Picture Soundtrack)
| No. | Title | Lyrics | Music | Singer | Length |
|---|---|---|---|---|---|
| 1. | "Mandarappoove" | Joe Paul | Jakes Bejoy | Aavani Malhar | 03:59 |
| 2. | "Shilakal" | Kaithapram Damodaran Namboothiri | Jakes Bejoy | Akhil J Chand, Vaiga Nambiar | 02:56 |
| 3. | "Sita Kalyana" | Jyothish Kassi | Jakes Bejoy | Akhil J Chand, Akhila Anand | 02:15 |
| 4. | "Nizhaladum" | Jyothish Kassi | Manikandan Ayyappa | Manikandan Ayyappa | 02:29 |
| 5. | "Pattuduthu Vannathum" | Arivu, Athul Narukara, Srihari Tharayil | Jakes Bejoy | Arivu, Athul Narukara, Jakes Bejoy | 04:08 |
| Total length: | | | | | 15:47 |
