= Geetu Mohandas =

Indian actress and filmmaker (born 1981)

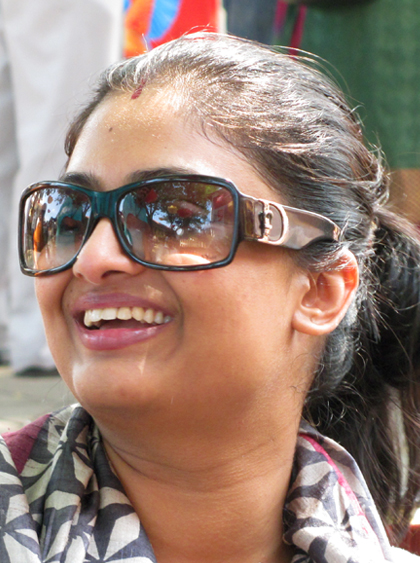
- Geethu in 2010
- Born: Gayatri Das; Kochi, Kerala, India
- Other name: Geetu
- Occupations: Actress; film director
- Years active: 1986–Present
- Spouse: Rajeev Ravi (m. 2009)
- Children: 1
- Awards: Kerala State Film Awards, Best Actress, 2004; Filmfare Awards, Best Actress, 2004; Sundance Film Festival, Global Film Maker Award, 2016

Gayatri Das, better known by her stage name Geetu Mohandas, is an Indian actress and director known for her works in Malayalam cinema. In 2013, she directed the socio political film Liar's Dice which has received two National Film Awards, was premiered at Sundance Film Festival, and was India's official entry at the 87th Academy Awards for Best Foreign Language Film.

== Career ==
=== Acting ===
Gayatri Das adopted her nickname "Geetu" as her screen name as when she appeared in her fourth film, Onnu Muthal Poojyam Vare (1986), starring Mohanlal. At the age of five, she portrayed a fatherless child who forms a bond with an anonymous telephone caller.

As a child actor, she also played the title role in the Tamil film En Bommukutty Ammavukku, a remake of Ente Mamattikkuttiyammakku, in which Shalini had portrayed the lead character.

Geetu made her debut as an adult actor in Life Is Beautiful, again starring Mohanlal. She subsequently appeared in films including Thenkasi Pattanam, Valkannadi, and Nammal Thammil. Her performance in Akale, directed by Shyamaprasad and produced by Tom George Kolath, earned her the Kerala State Film Award for Best Actress and the Filmfare Award for Best Actress – Malayalam in 2004.

=== Directing ===
Geetu Mohandas formed her film production house, Unplugged, in 2009 which produced her directorial debut short fiction film titled Kelkkunnundo (transl. Are You Listening). The film premiered at the International Film Festival Rotterdam and subsequently won 3 International awards for Best Short fiction as well as the National Film Award in India. The film has been included as a chapter in the 12th standard Kerala state syllabus since 2014.

Her first feature film, Liar's Dice, received the Hubert Bals fund for script and project development and the film was selected in Competition for the world dramatic competition at Sundance Film Festival in 2014. Liar's Dice went on to win six major international awards across the world and two National awards in India. It was also India's official entry for the Best Foreign Film category for the 87th Academy Awards.

Her second feature film, Moothon was mentored by the Sundance film lab and Geetu also won the Global film maker award at Sundance Film Festival in 2016. Moothon had its World premiere at Toronto International Film Festival in 2019 and was the opening film at MAMI 2019.

Her third film, Toxic, starring Yash, Nayanthara, Kiara Advani, Rukmini Vasanth, Tara Sutaria and Huma Qureshi was released on August 26, 2026. The film was a critical and commercial failure.

== Personal life ==
She was born as Gayatri Das to Mohandas and Latha on 8 June 1981 at Kochi. Studied in India, Malaysia and Canada. She has a brother living in US. On 14 November 2009, she married cinematographer Rajeev Ravi. The wedding took place at night in Kochi, Kerala, India. The couple have a daughter.

== Awards ==
=== As actor ===
Year	Award	Category	Work	Result	Ref
1986	Kerala State Film Award	Best Child Artist	Onnu Muthal Poojyam Vare	Won	
2001	Kerala Film Critics Association Award	Best Actress	Shesham	Won	
2004	Kerala State Film Award	Best Actress	Akale, Oridam	Won	
2004	Filmfare Awards South	Best Actress, Malayalam	Akale	Won	
2004	Asianet Film Awards	Special Jury Mention	Akale	Won	
2004	Kerala Film Critics Association Award	Special Jury Award	Akale	Won	
2004	Mathrubhumi Medimix Film Awards	Best Character Actress	Akale	Won	

=== As filmmaker ===
Year	Award	Category	Work	Result	Ref
2009	International Film Festival of India	Golden Lamp Tree Award for Best Film and Director	Kelkkunnundo	Won	
2010	Mumbai International Film Festival	Jury Award	Kelkkunnundo	Won	
2014	Sofia International Film Festival	FIPRESCI Award for Best Film	Liar's Dice	Won	
2014	Sofia International Film Festival	Special Jury Award	Liar's Dice	Won	
2014	Pesaro International Film Festival	Lino Micciche Award for Best Film	Liar's Dice	Won	
2014	Granada Cines del Sur Film Festival	Bronce Alhambra	Liar's Dice	Won	
2017	Sundance Film Festival	Global Filmmaking Award, story	Moothon	Won	
2020	New York Indian Film Festival	Best Film	Moothon	Won	
2020	Cincinnati Indian Film Festival	Best Screenplay	Moothon	Won	
2020	Festival du Film d'Asie du Sud, Paris	Best Film	Moothon	Won	
2020	Festival du Film d'Asie du Sud, Paris	Jury Prize	Moothon	Won	
2020	Indo German Film Week	Audience Choice Award	Moothon	Won	
2020	Ramu Karyat Award	Promising Director	Moothon	Won	

== Filmography ==
=== As an actress ===
List of Geetu Mohandas film acting credits
Year	Title	Role	Notes	Ref.
1986	Onnu Muthal Poojyam Vare	Deepa	Child Role	
1986	Sayam Sandhya	Vinu	Child Role	
1986	Veendum	Anu	Child Role	
1986	Rareeram	Geethu	Child Role	
1988	En Bommukutty Ammavukku	Tinnu	Child Role; Tamil film	
2000	Life Is Beautiful	Bala	Debut as lead actress	
2000	Thenkasipattanam	Sangeetha		
2001	Kannaki	Kumudam		
2002	Kakke Kakke Koodevide	Sudharma		
2002	Pakalppooram	Seemandini		
2002	Krishna Gopalakrishna	Gayathri		
2002	Sesham	Meera		
2002	Valkannadi	Devu		
2003	Sahodharan Sahadevan	Arathi		
2003	Shingari Bolona	Maya		
2003	Nala Damayanthi	Damayanthi	Tamil film	
2003	Choonda	Mohini Varma/Archana		
2003	Mullavalliyum Thenmavum	Eva Cherian		
2004	Oridam	A Sex worker with no name		
2004	Thudakkam	Karthika		
2004	Akale	Rose		
2005	Ullam	Radha		
2005	Pauran	Annie		
2005	Rappakal	Malavika Varma		
2006	Kisan	Ammu / Ambili Varma		
2006	Poi	Ramya	Tamil film	
2006	Arunam	Seetha		
2006	Mouryan	Anjali		
2007	Bharathan Effect	Geetha		
2007	Thakarachenda	Latha		
2007	Naalu Pennungal	Kumari	Segment: Kanyaka	
2008	Aakasha Gopuram	Catherine		
2009	Nammal Thammil	Anu		
2009	Seetha Kalyanam	Abhirami		

=== As director ===
Key
†	Denotes films that have not yet been released

List of Geetu Mohandas film directing credits
Year	Film	Language	Notes	Ref.
2009	Kelkkunnundo	Malayalam	Short film	
2013	Liar's Dice	Hindi	Special Jury award at the 18th Sofia International Film Festival; Received two National Film Awards	
2019	Moothon	Malayalam	Global Filmmaking award for story in Sundance film festival 2016	
2026	Toxic: A Fairy Tale for Grown-Ups	Kannada; English	Bilingual film	
