= Backpackers (film) =

- Directed by: Jayaraj
- Written by: Jayaraj
- Produced by: Dr. Suresh Kumar Muttath
- Starring: Kalidas Jayaram; Karthika Nair
- Cinematography: Abhinandan Ramanujam
- Edited by: C. R. Sreejith
- Music by: Sachin Shankor Mannath
- Release date: 18 March 2021
- Country: India
- Language: Malayalam

Backpackers is a 2021 Indian Malayalam-language drama film directed by Jayaraj and starring Kalidas Jayaram and newcomer Karthika Nair. The film was released on the OTT platform Roots to negative reviews.

== Plot ==
According to the director, the film, about two cancer patients falling in love, is based on a true story.

== Cast ==
- Kalidas Jayaram as Khalil
- Karthika Nair as Daya
- Renji Panicker as Rowther
- Sabitha Jayaraj as Lakshmi
- Dr. B D Gangadharan as himself
- Shivajith Padmanabhan as Jolly Katturan
- Jayakumar Parameswaran Pillai as Ammachan
- Keshav Jayaraj as Mathukutty
- Ullas Pandalam

== Production ==
The film's production was finished in three weeks in 2019. The film was shot in Gavi, Kottayam, Thiruvalla, Varkala and Wagamon.

== Soundtrack ==
The music was composed by Sachin Shankor Mannath. All lyrics by Jayaraj.

Song	Singer
"Kaattin"	Haricharan, Archana Vijayan
"Janalilaaro"	Akhila Anand, Sooraj Santhosh
"Omanathinkal Kidavo"	Bombay Jayashree, Sachin Shankor Mannath, Rahul Vellal

== Reception ==
A critic from The Times of India wrote that "Despite heartbreak waiting around the corner and a readymade chance to win audiences over with a tearjerker, Backpackers fails to really strike a chord". A critic from Onmanorama wrote that "Backpackers is a different musical to enjoy a day in the lap of nature away from the bustle and sit wondering if the places were so beautiful and love so much refreshing". A critic from The Times of India Samayam wrote that "Although it fails to engage the audience, the film passes without getting too boring. But still there is inconsistency in the addition of some scenes which is also the failure of the director".
