= Pennu Case =

2026 Malayalam Drama film

- Theatrical release poster
- Directed by: Febin Sidharth
- Written by: Febin Sidharth; Resmi Radhakrishnan
- Produced by: Mukesh R Mehta; Umesh K R Bansal; Rajesh Krishna; C V Sarathi
- Starring: Nikhila Vimal; Hakim Shahjahan; Ramesh Pisharody; Aju Varghese; Shivajith
- Cinematography: Shinoz
- Edited by: Shameer Muhammed
- Music by: Ankit Menon
- Distributed by: E4 Entertainments; Zee Studios; London Talkies
- Release date: 10 January 2026 (India)
- Running time: 112 minutes
- Country: India
- Language: Malayalam

Pennu Case is a 2026 Indian Malayalam-language crime comedy drama film written and directed by Febin Sidharth in his directorial debut. The screenplay was cowritten by Resmi Radhakrishnan. The film stars Nikhila Vimal, Hakim Shahjahan, Aju Varghese, Shivajith and Ramesh Pisharody in important roles.

== Plot ==
A group of men storms into a wedding hall, creating chaos and attacking the groom, Subash. The situation escalates, and all of them are taken into police custody. At the police station, a shocking truth comes to light. The groom's fiancée, Rohini, had previously married each of those men. Investigations under CI Manoj reveal that Rohini had done fraudulent marriages across rural areas cheating many men. When questioned about her motives, she remains silent, visibly frightened by someone.

After a few days, she finally breaks her silence. She reveals that her life took a drastic turn after a landslide in Kerala forced her and her mother to relocate to Mysore. There they found shelter with Arul, the son of her father's friend. During that time, both fell in love with each other. Struggling to find a stable job, she faced financial pressure, especially when her mother fell seriously ill. Desperate for money to cover the medical expenses, she was drawn into a fraudulent marriage racket operated by a man named David. Under his direction, she married a man, only to flee on the wedding night with all the jewellery, handing it over to David in exchange for money. With that she managed to pay her mother's hospital bills and secure her discharge. She decided never to repeat the crime. However, David threatened her and forced her to continue participating in the scam trapping her in a cycle she could not escape.

Once, she got caught by the Karnataka Police. But was released under David's influence and money. However, she becomes a pawn in their game. Determined to escape, she secretly gathered crucial evidence from David's laptop and approached the police. But her hope shatters when she realises that the police themselves are in a team with David. She is sent back. Later Rohini, along with Arul and her mother are attacked as a warning. Soon after, a powerful figure known as Jeevan Pulikkunnel, an influential leader from Kerala and the real mastermind behind the entire racket enters the scene. He takes Rohini back to Kerala and forces her to continue the same fraudulent marriage operations there. Under strict surveillance by David and team, Rohini was taught what to say, how to behave, and how to gain the trust of the targets. She continued this life of deception, until she is finally caught now.

For Manoj, it has now turned into a personal case as he has a past with Jeevan. Manoj underwent a punishment transfer due to a false sexual harassment orchestrated by Jeevan. Now, seeing Rohini's case as an opportunity, Manoj decides to expose the entire network and take revenge by bringing out the truth with solid evidence. Manoj and his team devise a plan for it. During a hospital visit for Rohini's medical checkup, they deliberately created an opportunity for her to escape. Manoj and Rohini collects the pendrive that contains all the evidence against Jeevan and David. Rohini is let free but is kept under surveillance by Manoj's team. Believing that David or his men will eventually come to her to retrieve the evidence, Manoj keeps waiting. But using a clever distraction, Rohini evades the surveillance and escapes on a bus. Despite this, Manoj arrests Jeevan, convinced that the evidence in the pendrive will finally expose everything. However, at the police station its revealed that the pendrive contains nothing but songs. There is no evidence.

In a stunning twist, it becomes clear that Rohini had been deceiving everyone all along. The emotional backstory she narrated, the Mysore incident, David, the forced crimes, was nothing but a fabricated tale, inspired by a television serial. Even Arul's story was cleverly constructed after she learned about his death from a newspaper. She had manipulated the police team with the same methodology she used on her victims, the grooms. Manoj faces suspension. Rohini continues her life as a master of fraudulent marriages. Manoj finds her in a temple in Tamil Nadu, with a husband and apparoches her.

== Cast ==
- Nikhila Vimal as Rohini
- Hakim Shahjahan as CI Manoj
- Aju Varghese as Subash
- Ramesh Pisharody as Vijaykumar
- Shivajith as David
- P. P. Kunhikrishnan as SI Gangettan
- Irshad Ali as Thomas
- Akhil Kavaliyoor
- Hari Pathanapuram
- Sandhya Manoj as SP Sushama Sudharsan IPS
- Kiran Peethambaran as Jeevan Pulikkunel
- Praveen Raja as Arul
- Anarkali Nazar as Rajeesha, Manoj's wife
- Sreerekha as CPO Sini
- Ranji Kankol as CPO Aneesh
- Lali P M as Rohini's mother
- Abdul Kareem Valiyakath (Lala Malappuram) as Basheer
- Bala as Rohini's tamil husband (cameo appearance)

== Production ==
The movie was announced on October 31, 2024, by releasing the title poster. The title poster was an illustration of a group of men chasing a bride. The shooting of the movie began in February 2025 after traditional pooja ceremony at Mysore. The movie was shot in Mysore and Kerala. The shooting was wrapped up on 18 April 2025. The teaser of the movie was released on 10 October 2025. The trailer of the film was released on 20 December 2025.

The cinematography of the movie was done by Shinoz. Shameer Muhammed handled the editing of the movie. The screenplay was cowritten by Febin Sidharth and Resmi Radhakrishnan. The dialogues were penned by Jyothish M, Sunu A V and Ganesh Malayath.

== Soundtrack ==
The songs of the movie was composed by multiple music directors. Ankit Menon was the music supervisor of the film. The track listing is as given below.

Pennu Case (Original Motion Picture Soundtrack)
No.	Title	Lyrics	Music	Singer(s)	Length
1.	"Kadhal Nadhiye"	Ganesh Malayath, Ponnumani	Pravatish Pradeep	Sanjith Hegde, iSai	3:57
2.	"Narayana Jaya"	Adarsh Ajith, Black	Arcado	Pranavam Sasi	3:37
3.	"Kaathangal"	Haniya Nafisa	Haniya Nafisa	Neha Nair	3:15
4.	"Padi Thanda Pathni"	Farhash	Cee Vee, Farhash	Cee Vee, Farhash	2:41

== Release ==
The film was initially planned to release on 16 January 2026. As Jana Nayagan movie got postponed, there were freed up slots available across Kerala. Hence the movie was preponed and released on 10 January 2026. The movie premiered on Amazon Prime on 10 March 2026.

== Reception ==
Dhanya K. Vilayil of The Indian Express opines that the movie if one is not going behind the logic, the movie won't disappoint you. Its a two-hour fun ride. Princy Alexander of Onmanorama says that even though the movie doesn't explore the dramatic possibilities of the premise, the movie offers light humor, serviceable mystery and an interesting gender inversion which is a small step away from convention. She also appreciates the performance of Nikila Vimal and Hakkim Shajahan. Anjana George of The Times of India gives a rating of two on five and writes that despite having an interesting idea, the movie fails due to poor execution, weak performances and flawed technical execution. S. R. Praveen of The Hindu writes that the movie fails to use any possibilities of materials in their hand due to weak writing and ends up in an average territory.
