= Tom George Kolath =

Indian actor, film producer and director

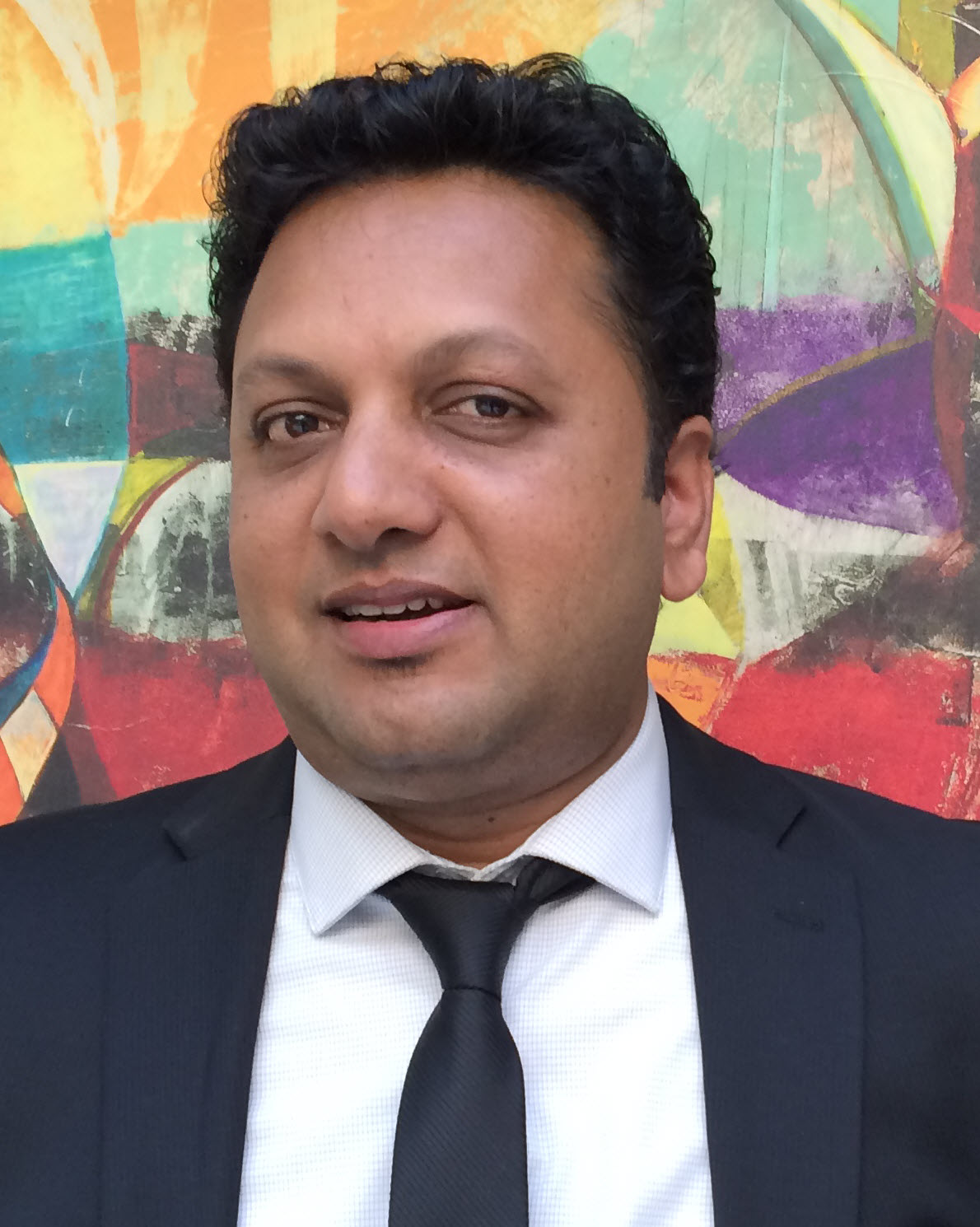
- Tom George Kolath
- Occupations: Film Producer, Director, Actor, Scriptwriter, Business Executive
- Years active: 2002–present
- Awards: National Award of India for his feature film Akale
- Website: www.tomgeorge.com

Tom George Kolath, better known as Tom George, is a film producer, director, actor and scriptwriter in the Malayalam Film Industry. He first came to attention for his performance in mini-screen Anna television serial (based on Tolstoy's Anna Karenina) directed by Alagappan. Akale, a film produced by him won the National Film Award and the Kerala State Film Award for best Malayalam feature film.

== Film career ==
Tom George Kolath started his film career in 2004 as the producer of the Malayalam feature film Akale, directed by Shyamaprasad; the film won 6 Kerala State Film Awards and 2 National Film Awards including the award for the best feature film in Malayalam. Akale was selected at film festivals around the world including 'Fukuoka Focus-on-Asia International Festival' in Japan, 'Foyle International Film Festival' in Northern Ireland, 'River To River Festival' in Florence, Italy, 'Indo-German International Film Festival' in Bangalore, IFFK in Kerala, and Tehran International Film Festival.

In addition to his production credit on Akale, he produced the feature film Meerayude Dukhavum Muthuvinte Swapnavum.

He directed and co-wrote the yet to be-released Hollywood movie GandhiPark.

He has also acted in the Malayalam feature films Black, Finger Print and Out of Syllabus.

=== Filmography ===
- Meerayude Dukhavum Muthuvinte Swapnavum - producer
- Akale - producer, actor
- Black - Malayalam feature film - actor
- Finger Print - actor
- Out of Syllabus - actor
- Gandhi Park - Independent film director, co-writer
- Ullurukkam - tele film - actor
- Lessons - Tele Film - director, writer
- Anna - TV Serial - actor, producer
- Summer in America - actor
- Folklore (video game) ("FolksSoul: Ushinawareta Denshou") – voice
- Casualty - actor
- India Gate - actor

=== Music videos ===
- En Jeevane – director and actor - 2005
- Dance With My Father – director - 2006
- Nee EnnArike – direction and lyrics - 2009
- Manoharam – lyrics and actor - 2009
- Athirillatha Sneham – actor - 2008
- Kumaran Asan's Chandala-bikshuki – actor - 2008

=== Commercials ===
- Coral Group - 2008
- Casadel Fauno Resorts - 2009
- Keltron USA, Ltd - 2010
