= Akale =

- Directed by: Shyamaprasad
- Based on: The Glass Menagerie by Tennessee Williams
- Produced by: Tom George Kolath
- Starring: Prithviraj; Sheela; Geetu Mohandas; Tom George Kolath
- Cinematography: S. Kumar
- Edited by: Vinod Sukumaran
- Music by: M Jayachandran
- Release date: 28 May 2004
- Country: India
- Language: Malayalam

Akale is a 2004 Indian Malayalam-language film directed by Shyamaprasad, inspired by the American classic play The Glass Menagerie by Tennessee Williams. The film stars Prithviraj Sukumaran, Sheela, Geetu Mohandas and Tom George Kolath in lead roles. It won several awards including, 2 National Film Awards and 6 Kerala state film awards.

== Plot ==
The film starts with Neil, a writer bidding farewell to his partner Kamala, who wishes him luck with his writing. He intends to write about Rose, his sister as promised to a publisher. However, Kamala plans on leaving Neil, complaining of his selfishness all along and preference to his own life. He even blames their daughter leaving them on him. She asks him to dedicate his time for Rose now, though it is meaningless to her. Neil admits that he always hated himself. As he leaves, he sees a familiar face and then is struck by the pangs of realization. The very sight provokes a sudden outflow of memories and the story goes back into a flashback.

Neil and his Anglo-Indian family lives in Kerala. He is a disturbed youth working as a clerk in a factory for low wages. His intention is to become a writer. He lives with his mother Margaret and sister Rosemary. His father was a Portuguese sailor who left the family when the children were very young. Rose, his sister is slightly handicapped and because of this, she is always in her shell. She is bound to inferiority complex and mental fragility. She is very much interested in glass figurines that adorn her showcase. She simply gazes at the iridescent beauty of the figurines in her loneliness. Margret, Neil's mother hates his care-free attitude towards life and his late-night movies. She is a very possessive mother and she is always worried about the future of her daughter. She doesn't allow her daughter to do household chores and talks about the tenderness of Rose's age, which must not be doomed by working at home. One day, Margaret goes to the typewriting class where she had previously sent Rose. She finds out that Rose had quit the class very early and had even fainted while taking a speed test. Margaret confronts Rose and learns that she had been spending her spare time at the church and the museum. As Rose feels sorry for her crippled stage, Margaret advises her to develop her other skills and that girls with no such duty must be sent off in marriage. They gaze at the portrait of their father as Margaret explains how handsome he was.

The next day, Margaret finds some adult novels with Neil. She angrily scolds him and this later turns into a violent fit of rage. Neil ends up calling his mother an "old chattering witch" and storms out. As he is leaving, breaks one of Rose's figurines, and Rose watches this with pity. Neil returns drunk at night and says to Rose that he had been to a Magic Show. He gives Rose a magic scarf that he got from the show in order to make up for her broken figurine. He convinces that this scarf will impart life to her glass animals and Rose is instantly mesmerized by it. Her isolated world is symbolized by her glass animals who are in a similar way much like Rose herself. The next day, Neil and Margaret reconcile and Margaret expresses her deep fears about her children, at the same time admitting of their talents. That night, Margaret makes Rose wish for everything, while looking up at the crescent moon though Rose is not sure what to wish for. Margaret asks Neil to bring a fine young man for dinner one day for Rose to get acquainted with that man. So Neil invites his co-worker Freddy for a dinner at his home. Margaret plans a light supper and digs up her old gown and reminisces about her tender teens. She dramatically slips into talking of her old days, how they had many servants while living in Goa and her fate of having reached a pathetic situation now. Neil's mother thinks that Freddy will get interested in Rose and they can marry her off. Margaret dresses up in the gown and compels Rose to do so. At this point, she says that all pretty girls are a trap in which handsome men must fall into. Rose reluctantly agrees to cooperate. Later, on hearing that the man about to come is her former senior schoolmate, Freddy, she refuses to sit for dinner. She had a crush on him for her was very artistic and athletic. As the dinner is about to start, Rose faints and Neil takes her to lay her down on the sofa. Later, Freddy and Rose get to talking and realizes their past connection. A flashback shows a young Rose who lives a pitiful time deprived of friends. Freddy remembers the time when he nicknamed her "Blue Rose" when Rose said that she had Pleurisy. Rose introduces her glass figurines to Freddy and particularly displays a unicorn figure, which was her favorite one and furthermore a reflection of her own life. She explains that the unicorn is odd due to its difference from all the others. Freddy enlightens Rose's spirit by saying that her difference from all the similar people of the world is her greatest peculiarity, just like the magical unicorn. People tend to like the oddness among the evenness. He even encourages her to be smarter at times and to think better of herself. Then both of them quietly dance to the beautiful song heard from the community dance hall outside. Rose is able to overcome her stereotypes and is able to keep up with the dance moves. Rose is lifted both physically and mentally. As the dance concludes, Freddy accidentally brushes against the table, knocking off the unicorn from the table. It fall and breaks the horn. But Rose is happy that with this incident, he can join the others as a normal one, for he had just undergone an operation to rectify his painful oddness. By these word, Rose indirectly refers to her own state of mind at that time for she becomes totally rejuvenated. But her hopes get crushed when she discovers that Freddy is already engaged to a girl named Betty. She is heartbroken, but bids farewell to Freddy as she gifts her unicorn to him. Margaret brings in Lime juice for them, but is so stuck on hearing from Freddy that he is engaged. She feels so humiliated but tries to keep up a smiling face. She blames this on Neil and taunts him verbally for cheating them. Neil, however, was unaware of the fact that Freddy was engaged. An argument arises as Margaret calls him selfish and deprived of feelings. With this, Neil storms out of the house, leaving them all alone forever. Margaret and Rose watch as their hope goes away.

The story returns to the present. Having recognized the man he saw at the ferry as Freddy, he decides to pay him a visit. He then takes him along with his family to see an aged and timid Margaret. She instantly recognizes Freddy and Betty. She is consoled by their presence as Freddy's little daughters gift her a bouquet of flowers. She explains that after Neil left them, Rose was admitted to a Mental Asylum near Madurai and that she lived a completely withdrawn life there. After a slight improvement, she suffered from an unexpected Nervous Breakdown and had died. Neil feels no guilt or sympathy, but only pain for Rose. He pens down her story to immortalize her as he imagines her spirit showing him light from the beyond. Later they all sit down for dinner as Rose's picture is shown at a distance (signifying the title), over which the magic scarf flies gently, giving life to her memories.

== Cast ==
- Prithviraj Sukumaran as Neil D'Costa
- Sheela as Margaret D'Costa
- Geetu Mohandas as Rosemary D'Costa (Rose)
- Tom George Kolath as Fredy Evans (voice dubbed by Mithun Ramesh)
- Sreelekha Mitra as Kamala
- Santha Devi as Typewriting teacher
- Gopika Anil as Henna Fredy

== Soundtrack ==
Akale

Soundtrack album by Gireesh Puthenchery and M. Jayachandran
- Released: 2004
- Studios: Krishna Digi Design Studio, Chennai
- Genre: Inspired by Soundtrack
- Label: Sony Music Entertainment India Pvt. Ltd. Under Exclusive Distribution For Satyam Audios
- Producer: M. Jayachandran

All lyrics are written by Gireesh Puthenchery; all music is composed by M. Jayachandran. All songs are inspired by the film.

No.	Title	Artist(s)	Length
1.	"Akale Akale"	Karthik
2.	"Rose Blue Rose (Nee Januvariyil Viriyumo)"	Sujatha Mohan, G. Venugopal
3.	"Praavukal Kurukunnu"	Chinmayi
4.	"Pinneyumetho"	M. Jayachandran
5.	"Pranayini njaan"	M. G. Sreekumar
6.	"Romance (Theme of Akale)"	M. Jayachandran
7.	"Aaraarumariyaathe"	P. Jayachandran
8.	"Nira Sandhya"	Ganga Sitharasu
9.	"Akale"	K. S. Chithra
10.	"Shaaronile Shishirame"	Preetha Kannan, Vidhu Prathap
11.	"Akale Akale (Recreated Version)"	Siddharth Menon

== Reception ==
Shobha Warier of Rediff ranked Akale amongst the best Malayalam films of the year and wrote, "At a time when Malayalam cinema is dominated by cheap comedies and crass commercial films, a film like Akale, based on the Tennessee Williams play The Glass Menagerie, comes as relief to those appreciative to quality. It is a small film, something like chamber music." They also praised Shyamaprasad writing, "Shyamaprasad had said that Akale was one film in which he had made the least compromises, artistically as well as technically. "I made this film to please my taste and tastes similar to mine," he said. It shows."

Sify praised the performance of the lead cast writing, "Sheela as a slightly hysterical mother out to make a life for her daughter, has got into the skin of the character. In fact she is much better than her last film Manassinakkare. Geetu has an excellent role that has been etched out well. Her large expressive eyes convey all her emotions and she is first class." However felt that Prihtviraj's performance as Niel "could have been better" and wrote that his make up as a 70-year old is "disappointing". They wrote, "Cinematic realism is something that film makers do not care about these days but Shyamprasad should be applauded for making Akale, an offbeat subject handled with a lot of sensitivity and care."

On 8 June 2004, Indiainfo wrote, "The film is in form of narration by Neil. Prithivraj as usual is good. But at times he does not look as a 70-year-old man. Geethu Mohandas has performed excellently. Sheela has also given her best. Tom Gieorge is okay." They conclude, writing, "Akale has good music, which suits the mood of the film. Camera work by S Kumar is good. Direction Shyamprasad has handled the film well. Overall a good offbeat film."

Paresh C. Palicha of Now Running wrote, "Akale may not prove to be a money-spinner at the box-office, but those who rue the passing away of the parallel cinema movement will surely appreciate Shyamaprasad's effort." Web India rated the film "good" and wrote, "Shyamaprasad has succeeded in making an emotionally touching theme into a good movie. The roles of characters are sensitively defined. Rose's simplicity and Neil's dilemma is overwhelmingly portrayed. Sheela is excellent as an Anglo Indian mother and Geethu has performed her part with depth and range." BizHat wrote, "Cinematography by S. Kumar is excellent. Music gets well with the mood of the film. As a whole the movie is an emotionally satisfying stunner. It is worth watching."

== Awards ==
National Film Awards 2004

- National Film Award for Best Feature Film in Malayalam
- National Film Award for Best Supporting Actress - Sheela

Kerala state film awards 2004

- Best Film
- Best Director - Shyamaprasad
- Kerala State Film Award for Best Actress - Geetu Mohandas
- Second Best Actress - Sheela
- Best Cinematographer - S. Kumar
- Best Art Direction - Rajaunnithan

Filmfare Awards South 2004

- Best Actress (Malayalam)-Geetu Mohandas

Asianet Film Awards 2004

- 2004 - Special Jury Mention - Geetu Mohandas & Prithviraj

Mathrubhumi, Medimix film awards

- Best Character Actress-Geetu Mohandas
- Special jury award-Shyamaprasad
