= Sandeep Mohan =

Indian filmmaker

- Occupations: Filmmaker; producer; screenwriter
- Years active: 2012–present

Sandeep Mohan is an Indian independent filmmaker, producer and screenwriter known for his English and Hindi-language films.

== Early life and career ==
Originally from Kerala, Sandeep Mohan was born in Jabalpur before he moved to Mumbai to start his career. He initially worked as an assistant director to Sanjay Leela Bhansali for Hum Dil De Chuke Sanam (1999) before deciding to become an independent filmmaker. His first film Love, Wrinkle-free (2012), which was about an unwanted pregnancy, was awarded an A certificate. As a result, Sandeep decided to make his next film Hola Venky! with a crew of only three additional people and with a new initiative called travelling cinema in which he would not show the film to the censor board but instead to a small group of people worldwide. The film had a direct online release in India. He continued with his travelling cinema initiative for his next film Shreelancer (2017) before opting for an OTT platform for his most recent film Nirmal Anand ki Puppy (2019), which was inspired by his relationship with his pet dog.

== Other work ==
In 2016, he took part of the panel discussion on Alternative Distribution of Films at the Film Bazaar at the International Film Festival of India in Goa.

== Filmography ==
Year	Title	Credited as			Language	Notes
Year	Title	Director	Producer	Writer	Language	Notes
2012	Love, Wrinkle-free	Yes	No	Yes	English	
2014	Hola Venky!	Yes	Yes	Yes	English	
2015	X: Past Is Present	Yes	No	Yes	English	Also cinematographer; segment: "Fin"
2017	Shreelancer	Yes	Yes	Yes	Hindi; English	Won—Best Actor for lead actor Arjun Radhakrishnan at the Blue Whiskey Independent Film Festival in Chicago
2019	Nirmal Anand ki Puppy	Yes	Yes	Yes	Hindi	Won—DCSAFF Best Screenplay Award; Won—Indic Filmotsav Best Film Audience Choice Award
2023	Danny Goes Aum	Yes	Yes	Yes	English	Won—DCSAFF Best Feature Film(Jury) Award
