= Indrajith (2007 film) =

- Directed by: KK Haridas
- Written by: Rajesh Jayaraman
- Starring: Kalabhavan Mani
- Cinematography: Shamdat Sainudeen
- Edited by: G. Murali
- Music by: S. Jayan
- Release date: 7 September 2007
- Country: India
- Language: Malayalam

Indrajith is a 2007 Indian Malayalam action film, directed by KK Haridas, starring Kalabhavan Mani and Indraja in the lead roles.

== Cast ==
- Kalabhavan Mani as Changoottam Bhasi
- Divya Viswanath as Lakshmi
- Rajan P Dev as Chemparunthu Bhaskaran
- Saiju Kurup as Saheer Musthafa, Shahina's brother
- Nedumudi Venu as Panchayath President Madhavan Maashu
- Indraja as Shahina
- Shalu Menon as Suma
- Cochin Haneefa as CI Udumbu Rudrakshan Pillai
- Anil Murali as Hamsa
- Tosh Christy as Vinayan
- Sreejith Ravi as Jamal
- Bineesh Kodiyeri as Johny
- Riyaz Khan as Rajendran
- Baburaj as Hameed
- Adam Ayoob as Raghavan
- Ambika Mohan as Suhara, Shahina's and Saheer's mother
- Kanakalatha as Susheela
- Priyanka Anoop as SI Vishalayam
- Mini Arun
- Sudheer Sukumaran as Achankunju
- P. Sreekumar as Vasudevan

== Soundtrack ==
The film's soundtrack contains 3 songs, all composed by S. Jayan and Lyrics by Rajiv Alunkal.

#	Title	Singer(s)
1	"Kaanthaari Mulakaanu Nee"	Kalabhavan Mani, Rimi Tomy
2	"Mayilanji Monchulla"	M. G. Sreekumar, Sujatha Mohan
3	"Pon Vasantham"	Anjana
