= Nirmal Sahadev =

Indian film director, screenwriter and actor

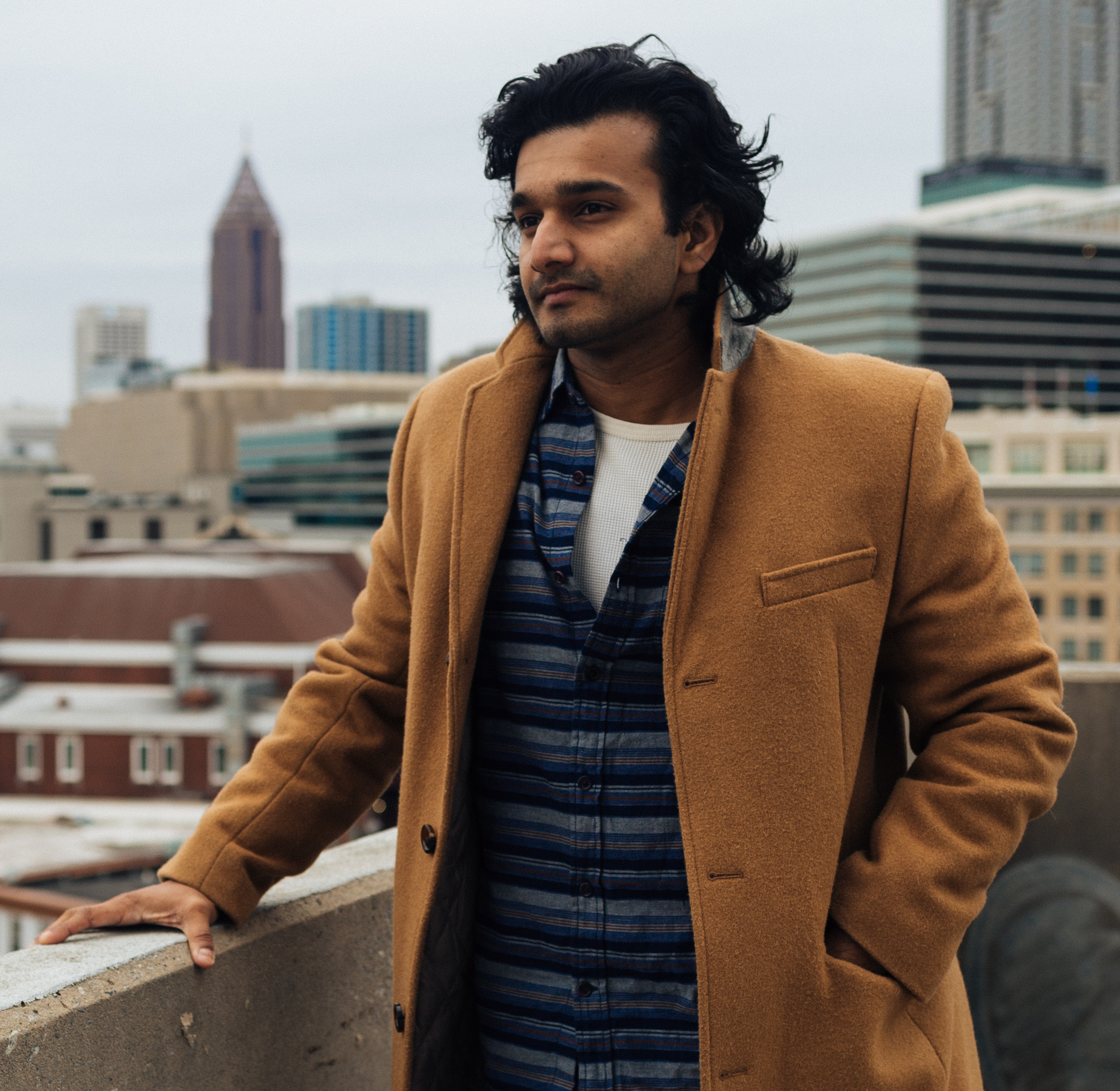
- Nirmal in 2020
- Born: 19 January 1985 (age 41); Thrithala, Kerala, India
- Education: New York Film Academy
- Occupations: Director; screenwriter; actor
- Years active: 2009–present

Nirmal Sahadev is an Indian film director, screenwriter and actor who works in the Malayalam film industry. He is best known for his directorial debut, Ranam (2018).

== Early life ==
Nirmal Sahadev was born in Thrithala, Palakkad, Kerala, India. He completed his primary education at The Abu Dhabi Indian School. He graduated with a master's degree in mechanical engineering from the Georgia Institute of Technology, Atlanta and is a graduate of the New York Film Academy.

== Career ==
Sahadev started his film career in Malayalam as an assistant director for the film Colours (2009). Later, he worked as an assistant for the film Monsoon Mangoes (2016). He also directed an English short film, titled "Sleep" (2012). He made his directorial debut in 2018 with the film Ranam.

== Filmography ==
Key
†	Denotes films that have not yet been released

=== As screenwriter and director ===
Year	Film	Director	Screenwriter	Notes
2018	Ranam	Yes	Yes	Directorial debut
2018	Hey Jude		Yes	
2022	Kumari	Yes	Yes	

==== Other crew positions ====
Year	Film	Position	Notes
2009	Colours	Assistant director	
2015	Ivide	Assistant director	
2016	Monsoon Mangoes	Assistant director	
2025	L2: Empuraan	Creative director	

==== Acting credits ====
Year	Title	Character	Notes
2015	Ivide	Aakash Murthy	
2016	Brown Nation	Luv	Netflix series
