= Ore Kadal =

Indian film by ShyamaPrasad

- Directed by: Shyamaprasad
- Written by: Shyamaprasad
- Produced by: Vindhyan
- Starring: Mammootty; Meera Jasmine; Narain; Ramya Krishnan
- Cinematography: Alagappan N.
- Edited by: Vinod Sukumaran
- Music by: Ouseppachan
- Release date: 27 August 2007
- Running time: 100 minutes
- Country: India
- Language: Malayalam

Ore Kadal (English: The Sea Within) is a 2007 Malayalam-language film written and directed by Shyamaprasad. The film is based on Sunil Gangopadhyay’s Bengali novel Hirak Deepthi. The film examines the extra-marital relationship between an intellectual economist and a housewife. It stars Mammootty, Meera Jasmine, Narain and Ramya Krishnan.

Ore Kadal was chosen as the inaugural film of the Indian Panorama section at the International Film Festival of India. Ouseppachan won the National Award for the Best Music Director for Ore Kadal. Despite critical acclaim, the film was commercially unsuccessful.

== Plot ==
The film is based on Sunil Gangopadhyay’s novel Hirak Deepthi. Dr. S. R. Nathan (Mammootty) is a 52-year old world-renowned professor of economics. A theorist to the core, he always harps on his pet topics of poverty and developmental issues that concern the developing world. He is a loner who is a drunkard, who drinks up to 10 bottles of liquor a day. He is also a chain smoker who smokes up to 25 boxes of cigarettes.

His close friend Bela (Ramya Krishnan) is more practical. She tries to identify herself with some of the stark realities of life.

Deepthi (Meera Jasmine) is a housewife who stays in the same apartment complex with her husband (Narain) and son. Her husband is on the lookout for a job. On his persuasion, Deepthi approaches Nathan.

Their chance encounter ends up in a sexual relationship. But Nathan is unperturbed and quite unmindful of his ways. While Deepthi gets a feeling of guilt, Nathan just shoos it away. In fact, he is working on a book on middle-class attitudes and notions. Yet, when confronted with real questions, Nathan loses ground — a reference to the pseudo-intellectual image. Nathan urges Deepthi to have sex with him, but she strictly refuses, saying that she is already married. Then, both of them had fights regularly and did not talk to each other, with Deepti thinking that Nathan is a weirdly acting man.

Here, the director closely examines the disturbing relationship between two individuals. Deepthi is not able to pull herself away from Nathan. However, Deepthi gets to know about all the bad habits of Nathan and tries to pull herself away from him. But, she realises love and affection growing towards Nathan.

The undercurrents in the minds of Deepthi and Nathan, their tormented souls as turbulent as the sea, are captured on frame dexterously by Alagappan N., the cameraman. Though the film does not give any direct message, it does hint at what makes or breaks a relationship.

== Cast ==
- Mammootty as Dr. S. R. Nathan
- Meera Jasmine as Deepthi
- Narain as Jayakumar, Deepthi's Husband
- Ramya Krishnan as Bela, Nathan's close friend
- Sindhu Shyam as Arathy

== Soundtrack ==
Ore Kadal

Soundtrack album by Ouseppachan
- Released: 2007
- Genre: Film soundtrack

Ouseppachan chronology
July 4 (2007)	Ore Kadal (2007)	Nazrani (2007)

The soundtrack features five songs composed by Ouseppachan and lyrics penned by Gireesh Puthenchery. All songs and background music is composed in the Carnatic raga Shubhapantuvarali. Syamaprasad told Ouseppachan that this movie's mood is serious. So he composed the music in that raga. The soundtrack earned Ouseppachan the National Film Award for Best Music Direction.

Song	Artist(s)
"Manassinte"	Sujatha Mohan, G. Venugopal
"Nagaram Viduram"	Vineeth Sreenivasan
"Oru Kadalay"	Naveen Nair
"Pranaya Sandhyayoru"	Bombay Jayashri
"Yamuna Veruthe"	Shweta Mohan
"Yamuna Veruthe"	Ouseppachan

== Film festival participation ==
- IFFI Indian Panorama, 2007
- Asiatic – Rome, 2008
- Fribourg International Film Festival, Switzerland, 2008
- Indian Film Festival of Los Angeles, 2008
- International Film Festival of Minneapolis, 2008
- Cine Del Sur, Granada, Spain, 2008
- Stuttgart Festival of Bollywood and Beyond, July 2008
- Festival of Malayalam Films, Vollodoid, Spain, June 2008
- International Film Festival of Kerala, 2007
- Hyderabad International Film Fest
- Pune International Film Festival
- MAMI Festival, Mumbai
- Habitat Film Festival, New Delhi
- Asian Film Festival, Abudhabi

== Awards ==
At the 55th National Film Awards according to Sibi Malayil, one of the jury members of feature film, Meera Jasmine was one of the front runners for National Film Award for Best Actress, along with Jyothika for the Tamil film Mozhi and Umashree for the Kannada film Gulabi Talkies. However, she lost the award to Umashree who was adjudged the Best Actress.

National Film Awards

- National Film Award for Best Feature Film in Malayalam
- Best Music Direction - Ouseppachan

Kerala State Awards 2007

- Second Best Film - Ore Kadal
- Best Actress - Meera Jasmine
- Best Background Score - Ouseppachan
- Best Editor - Vinod Sukumaran

Filmfare Awards South

- Filmfare Award for Best Actress - Malayalam - Meera Jasmine
- Filmfare Award for Best Female Playback Singer – Malayalam - Shweta Mohan

Dubai Amma Awards 2007

- Best Movie - Ore Kadal
- Best Actor - Mammootty
- Best Actress - Meera Jasmine
- Best Supporting Actress - Ramya Krishnan
- Best Camera Man - Azhakappan
- Best Music Director - Ouseppachan

IFFK 2007 Awards

- NETPAC Award for the Best Malayalam Film
- Fipresci Award for the Best Malayalam Film

Asianet Film Award 2007

- Best Actor award - Mammootty
- Best Actress award - Meera Jasmine

Film Critics Award 2007

- Best Movie
- Best Director
- Best Female Singer
- Best Camera man
- Best Sound Recorder

Vanitha Film Award 2007

- Best Actor- Mammootty
- Best Actress - Meera Jasmine

FOKANA Film Award 2007

- Best Actor - Mammootty
- Best Actress - Meera Jasmine

Sify Award 2007

- Best Movie - Ore Kadal
- Best Actor - Mammootty
- Best Actress - Meera Jasmine

Amrita Film Awards 2007

- Best Director - Shyamaprasad
- Best Actor - Mammootty
- Best Actress - Meera Jasmine
- Best Supporting Actress - Ramya Krishnan
- Best Music Director - Ouseppachan
- Best Female Singer - Shweta Mohan

Others

- John Abraham Award for Best Malayalam Film - Ore Kadal
- V.Santharam National Award for the Best Actress - Meera Jasmine
- First Sreevidya Award for Best Actress - Meera Jasmine
- Bollywood & Beyond 2008 (Stuttgart, Germany): Audience Best Film Award for Ore Kadal
