= Shyamaprasad =

Indian filmmaker

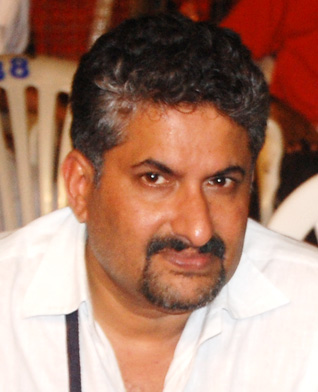
- Shyamaprasad at a press meeting
- Born: 7 November 1960 (age 65); Palakkad, Kerala, India
- Occupations: Director; actor; screenwriter
- Years active: 1998–present
- Parents: O. Rajagopal; Dr. Shantha Kumari
- Awards: Gollapudi Srinivas Award; National Film Awards; Kerala State Film Awards; Filmfare Awards South

Shyamaprasad (born 7 November 1960) is an Indian filmmaker, screenwriter and actor who works in Malayalam films.

== Early life and career ==
Shyamaprasad was born on 7 November 1960 in Palakkad, Kerala, as the younger son of politician O. Rajagopal and Dr. Shantha Kumari. He was named after Shyama Prasad Mukherjee, the founder of Bharatiya Jan Sangh.

Shyamaprasad studied at the Basel Evangelical Mission School, Palakkad. After completing his degree in Theatre Arts from the School of Drama and Fine Arts, Thrissur, he received the Commonwealth Scholarship in 1989 and did his Masters in Media Production at the University of Hull.

Shyamaprasad worked as an intern at the BBC and Channel 4, to Indian television and redefined the parameters of telefilms and documentaries in Malayalam Television with Doordarshan. He serves as the President (Programming) at Amrita TV. His features for TV and cinema have won him several national and state awards namely Agnisakshi and Akale, produced by Tom George Kolath, had been adjudged the best regional cinema films of the nation in 1998 and 2004.

For television, he has adapted the works of Anton Chekhov (Vivahalochana); Albert Camus (The Just); Vaikom Muhammad Basheer (Viswavikhyathamaya Mookku); Madhavikkutty (Venalinte Ozhivu); N Mohanan (Peruvazhiyile Kariyilakal); Sarah Joseph (Nilavariyunnu), N. P. Mohammed (Ullurukkam) and K. Radhakrishnan (Shamanathalam). He was awarded the Best Television Director prize for the year 1993, 1994 and 1996.

Shyamaprasad had been invited to serve twice as the jury of the National Film Awards. His 2007 production Ore Kadal, based on a Bengali novel by Sunil Gangopadhyay, was chosen as the inaugural film of the Indian Panorama at the International Film Festival of India 2007. His film Ritu (Seasons), released in early August 2009 is seen by one reporter as the 'coming of age' of Malayalam cinema. He won the Best Director prize of the fiercely contested Kerala State Film Awards 5 times- namely for his films Agnisakshi, Akale, Elektra, Artist and Oru Njayarazhcha.

== Personal life ==
Shyamaprasad was married to Sheeba, who died in 2023. The couple has two children, Vishnu and Sivakami. He resides in Thiruvananthapuram, Kerala.

== Filmography ==
Key
†	Denotes films that have not yet been released

=== As a director ===
Year	Title	Notes	Notes
1988	Peruvazhiyile Karyilalakal	Director	Telefilm
1998	Kallu Kondoru Pennu		
1999	Agnisakshi	Also writer	
2002	Bokshu – The Myth	Also co-writer English film, Indo-American co-production	
2004	Akale	Also writer	
2007	Ore Kadal	Also writer	
2009	Ritu	Screened at the Valladolid International Film Festival	
2009	Kerala Cafe	Segment: Off Season	
2010	Elektra		
2012	Arike	Also writer	
2013	English: An Autumn in London		
2013	Artist	Also writer	
2015	Ivide		
2018	Hey Jude		
2019	Oru Njayarazhcha	Also writer	
2024	Manorathangal	Segment: Kazhcha	

=== As actor ===
Year	Title	Role	Notes
2013	Pattam Pole	Himself	Cameo appearance
2014	1 by Two	Dr. Cheriyan	
2015	Loham	Rajeev Sathyamoorthy	Cameo appearance
2015	Anarkali	Madhavan Nair	
2016	Karinkunnam 6'S	Mukul Kesavan	
2018	Abrahaminte Santhathikal	Issac	Cameo appearance
2018	Hey Jude	Interview Board Member	Cameo appearance
2018	Drama	Dr. Mukundhanunni	
2018	Ranam	Chandran	
2021	Chathurmukham	Ramachandran	
2021	Eighteen Hours		
2021	Meow	Doctor	
2023	Maheshum Marutiyum	TV show host	
2023	Otta		
2023	Queen Elizabeth		
2024	Amaran	George Varghese	Tamil film
2025	Aaro — Someone		Short film
2026	Valathu Vashathe Kallan	Psychiatrist	
2026	I'm Game	John	
2027	Harivarasanam †	TBA	

== Awards ==
National Film Awards

- 1998 – National Film Award for Best Feature Film in Malayalam: Agnisakshi
- 2004 – National Film Award for Best Feature Film in Malayalam: Akale
- 2007 – National Film Award for Best Feature Film in Malayalam: Ore Kadal

Kerala State Film Awards

- 1998 – Kerala State Film Award for Best Film : Agnisakshi
- 1998 – Kerala State Film Award for Best Director : Agnisakshi
- 2004 – Kerala State Film Award for Best Director : Akale
- 2004 – Kerala State Film Award for Best Film : Akale
- 2007 – Kerala State Film Award for Second Best Film : Ore Kadal
- 2010 – Kerala State Film Award for Best Director : Elektra
- 2013 – Kerala State Film Award for Best Director : Artist
- 2018 – Kerala State Film Award for Best Director : Oru Njayarazhcha
- 2018 – Kerala State Film Award for Second Best Film : Oru Njayarazhcha

Kerala Film Critics Association Awards

- 1999 – Kerala Film Critics Association Award for Best Film : Agnisakshi
- 1999 – Kerala Film Critics Association Award for Best Director : Agnisakshi
- 2007 – Kerala Film Critics Association Award for Best Film : Ore Kadal
- 2007 – Kerala Film Critics Association Award for Best Director : Ore Kadal

Filmfare Awards South

- 1999 – Filmfare Award for Best Director – Malayalam : Agnisakshi
- 2013 – Filmfare Award for Best Director – Malayalam : Artist

Other awards

- 1999 – Asianet Film Awards for Best Director : Agnisakshi
- 1999 – Gollapudi Srinivas Award : Agnisakshi
- 1999 – Aravindan Puraskaram for Best Debutant Director : Agnisakshi
- 2004 – Film Fans Association Awards : Akale
- 2004 – Mathrubhumi Film Awards for Special Jury Prize : Akale
- 2007 – FIPRESCI Award for Best Malayalam Film at IFFK : Ore Kadal
- 2007 – NETPAC Award for Best Malayalam film at IFFK : Ore Kadal
- 2007 – The German Star at the Stuttgart Film Festival : Ore Kadal
- 2007 – Amrita Film Award for Best Director : Ore Kadal
- 2007 – AMMA Annual Movie Award for Best Film : Ore Kadal
- 2007 – John Abraham Award for Best Malayalam Film : Ore Kadal
- 2007 – Malayalam Viewers Award for Best Film : Ore Kadal
