= AKG (film) =

- Directed by: Shaji N. Karun
- Starring: P. Sreekumar, Krishna Kumar
- Release date: 2007
- Country: India
- Language: Malayalam

A.K.G. is a 2007 Malayalam-language historical drama film, directed by Shaji N Karun, starring P. Sreekumar and Krishna Kumar in the lead roles. It is based on the political and personal life of communist leader A.K. Gopalan. The film was edited by Mahesh Narayanan, who had replaced B. Ajithkumar due to scheduling issues.

Lonappan Nambadan, who at the time was a Member of Parliament, played the role of the West Bengal communist leader Jyoti Basu. E.K. Nayanar was played by his son Krishna Kumar. Anirudhan Sampath portrayed the role of his father K. Aniruddhan.

Speaker of the Lok Sabha Somnath Chatterjee and CPI(M) general secretary Prakash Karat spoke at a Delhi screening of the film.

== Cast ==
- P Sreekumar as AKG
- Krishna Kumar as E.K. Nayanar
- Jayadevan
- Anirudhan Sampath as K. Aniruddhan
- Adv Vijaya Kumar
- Archana
- Ashish Varma
- Dr M. P. Parameswaran as E. M. S. Namboodiripad
- J Aparna
- Raveendran Kodakkadu
- Shubha Sharma
- Viswambharan
- Punathil Kunjabdulla as C. H. Muhammad Koya
- Lonappan Nambadan as Jyoti Basu
