= Ivide =

- Theatrical release poster
- Directed by: Shyamaprasad
- Written by: Ajayan Venugopalan
- Produced by: Dr. S. Sajikumar; Krishnan Sethukumar
- Starring: Prithviraj Sukumaran; Nivin Pauly; Bhavana
- Cinematography: Eric Dickinson
- Edited by: Manoj
- Music by: Gopi Sundar
- Production companies: Dharmik Films; Rajmati Films
- Distributed by: Central Pictures
- Release date: 29 May 2015
- Running time: 144 minutes
- Country: India
- Language: Malayalam

Ivide (transl. Here) is a 2015 Indian Malayalam-language crime thriller film written by Ajayan Venugopalan and directed by Shyamaprasad. The film stars Prithviraj Sukumaran, Nivin Pauly and Bhavana in the lead roles. The film's soundtrack was composed by Gopi Sundar. The film was released on 29 May 2015.

== Plot ==
Varun Blake is an Indian-born Atlanta police detective who is deeply affected by various incidents in his life like the loss of his biological family in India, the move to a predominantly white school in The States, and the death of his partner. He develops into a temperamental and disturbed man, forcing his Indian wife, Roshni to divorce him and move out of their home with their daughter. Varun then gets into a complicated rebound relationship with a local news reporter, Kate. After gaining American citizenship, Roshni gets a job at a newly outsourced Indian company based in Atlanta called InfoTech. She soon discovers that the company's young but successful director is her childhood friend, Krish Hebbar. The two starts seeing each other outside the office, much to Varun's dismay since he still has feelings for his ex-wife. Things take a turn for the worse when several Indian-born young men working for outsourced companies have been found murdered by a professional serial killer. The only link is that all the murder victims knew Krish. Varun brings him in for questioning but does not have enough evidence to arrest him. At around the same time, Krish's true colours are revealed when he blackmails his boss into giving him a promotion. On the dinner date night Roshni comes across a few pictures of the girl whom Krish had forced to go into the cabin of his boss. Seeing this Roshni confronts Krish and tells him that she does not hold any trust in him anymore. Krish tries explaining but couldn't and his plan to propose to her remains unfulfilled. After more investigation, Varun learns that the real murderer is a former soldier who was fired from several jobs and were then taken by Indian immigrants. The soldier comes for Krish, who took over his job several years ago. He is finally saved by Varun. In the end, Krish marries Roshni and they move back to India to work for the Indian branch of their company to be closer to family.

== Cast ==
- Prithviraj Sukumaran as Varun Blake
- Nivin Pauly as Krish Hebbar
- Bhavana as Roshni Mathew
- Nirmal Sahadev as Aakash Murthy
- Dhanish Karthik as Sanjeev Menon
- Prakash Bare as Mahesh Murthy
- Christina Leidel as Kate Brown
- Lyndrez Leslie as Steve
- Alexandra Bartree as Amy Williams
- Yolanda Asher as Mary Blake
- Lee Armstrong as Paul Bale
- Jia Patel as Trisha
- Shaun Xavier as Rohit Peter
- Deepti Nair as Akhila

== Production ==
Principal photography began on 10 November 2014. Filming predominantly took place in Atlanta, USA.

== Soundtrack ==
The film's soundtrack was composed by Gopi Sundar; all lyrics were written by Rafeeq Ahamed.

No.	Title	Singer(s)	Length
1.	"Etho Theerangal"	Gopi Sundar	4:19
2.	"Etho Theerangal (Duet)"	Gopi Sundar, Sithara	4:22
3.	"Ivide"	Prithviraj Sukumaran	4:21

== Reception ==
The film opened to a mixed reviews from critics. The International Business Times gave the film 3.5 out of 5 stars, calling it a "decent film". Veeyen of NowRunning gave the film 3 out of 5 stars, calling it "a demanding film that dexterously holds a mirror up to contemporary life in the United States of America". Bollywood Chats praised the cinematography and performances of some of the actors, but criticised the film for its lack of pace and its excessive length. The Times of India gave the film 2.5 out of 5 stars.

== Awards and nominations ==
Award	Category	Recipient	Ref.
46th Kerala State Film Awards	Best Editor	Manoj	
Asiavision Film Awards	Best Actor	Prithviraj Sukumaran	
