= List of Telugu films of 2011 =

This is a list of films produced in the Telugu film industry in India in 2011.

== Box office ==
Highest-grossing films of 2011
Rank	Title	Studio	Worldwide gross	Share	Ref.
1	Dookudu	14 Reels Entertainment	₹101 crore	₹56.7 crore	
2	Mr. Perfect	Sri Venkateswara Creations	₹57 crore	₹32 crore	
3	Badrinath	Geetha Arts	₹51 crore	₹30 crore	
4	Oosaravelli	Sri Venkateswara Cine Chitra	₹46 crore	₹27.6 crore	
5	Kandireega	Sri Sai Ganesh Productions	₹38 crore	₹22 crore	
6	100% Love	Geetha Arts	₹36 crore	₹18 crore	
7	Mirapakay	Yellow Flowers	₹34 crore	₹17 crore	
8	Shakthi	Vyjayanthi Movies	₹33 crore	₹19 crore	
9	Panjaa	Arka Media Works	₹31 crore	₹18.8 crore	
10	Teen Maar	Parameswara Art Productions	₹28 crore	₹17.4 crore	

== January–June ==
Opening		Title	Director	Cast	Production house	Ref
J A N	7	Graduate	Prasad Rayala	Akshay, Rithika Sood, Tashu Kaushik	Released by Script Technologies Pvt. Ltd.	
J A N	12	Parama Veera Chakra	Dasari Narayana Rao	Nandamuri Balakrishna, Sheela, Amisha Patel, Neha Dhupia		
J A N	13	Mirapakay	Harish Shankar	Ravi Teja, Richa Gangopadhyay, Deeksha Seth		
J A N	14	Anaganaga O Dheerudu	Prakash Kovelamudi	Siddharth, Shruti Haasan, Lakshmi Manchu	Produced by Walt Disney Pictures& A Bellyful of Dreams Entertainment Satellite	
J A N	14	Golconda High School	Mohan Krishna Indraganti	Sumanth, Swati Reddy		
J A N	21	Ala Modalaindi	Nandini Reddy	Nani, Nithya Menen	Produced under Sri Ranjith Movies	
J A N	26	Wanted	BVS Ravi	Gopichand, Deeksha Seth, Prakash Raj, Nassar, Jayasudha		
J A N	28	Vaareva	Kalyan Mantena	Vassudev Reddy, Shambhavi		
J A N	28	Rakshana	Venu Pal	Rajiv Kanakala, Karan, Parineeta		
F E B	4	Jai Bolo Telangana	N.Shankar	Jagapati Babu, Sandeep, Meera Nandan, Smriti Irani, K. Chandrashekar Rao		
F E B	11	Gaganam	Radha Mohan	Nagarjuna, Poonam Kaur, Prakash Raj, Sana Khan		
F E B	11	Vastadu Naa Raju	Hemant Madhukar	Vishnu Manchu, Taapsee Pannu, Prakash Raj		
F E B	18	Katha Screenplay Darsakatvam Appalaraju	Ram Gopal Varma	Sunil, Swati Reddy, Brahmanandam, Sakshi Gulati		
F E B	18	Aha Naa Pellanta!	Veera Brahmam	Allari Naresh, Ritu Barmecha		
F E B	18	LBW: Life Before Wedding	Praveen Sattaru	Abhijith Pundla, Asif Raj, Chinmayi Ghatrazu, Siddhu Jonnalagadda, Nishanthi Evani		
F E B	25	Kudirithe Kappu Coffee	Ramana Salva	Varun Sandesh, Suma Bhattacharya		
F E B	25	Prema Kavali	Vijaya Bhaskar. K	Aadi, Sindhu Tolani, Isha Chawla		
M A R	2	Mangala	Osho Thulasi Ram	Charmy Kaur, Pradeep Rawat, Subhash		
M A R	11	Thimmaraju	Vemagiri	Ali, Deepthi		
M A R	11	Nitya Pellikoduku	Alahari	Posani Krishna Murali, Apoorva, Gowri Pandit		
M A R	18	Dongala Mutha	Ram Gopal Varma, Puri Jagannadh	Ravi Teja, Charmy Kaur, Prakash Raj, Lakshmi Manchu, Sunil		
M A R	18	Raaj	V. N. Aditya	Sumanth, Priyamani, Vimala Raman		
M A R	18	Karalu Miriyalu	Pasupuleti Venkata Rama Rao	Navakesh, Madhu Shalini		
M A R	25	Chattam	Arun Prasad P. A.	Jagapathi Babu, Vimala Raman, Ashish Vidyarthi		
A P R	1	Sakthi	Meher Ramesh	Jr. NTR, Ileana D'Cruz, Prabhu, Manjari Phadnis, Jackie Shroff, Pooja Bedi, Ali, Brahmanandam	Produced by Vyjayanthi Movies	
A P R	8	Manchivadu	Deepthi	Tanish, Bhama, K. Vishwanath, Chandramohan		
A P R	8	Lokame Kothaga	Bharath Parepalli	Shivaji, Aditi Agarwal		
A P R	14	Teen Maar	Jayanth C. Paranjee	Pawan Kalyan, Trisha Krishnan, Kriti Kharbanda		
A P R	15	Galli Kurrolu	Sai Venkat	Naga Varma, Shefali Sharma		
A P R	22	Mr. Perfect	Dasrath	Prabhas, Kajal Aggarwal, Taapsee Pannu, Prakash Raj		
A P R	29	Koffi Bar	Geetha Krishna	Shashank, Bianca Desai		
A P R	29	Nenu Naa Rakshasi	Puri Jagannadh	Rana Daggubati, Ileana D'Cruz, Abhimanyu Singh, Mumaith Khan		
M A Y	6	100% Love	Sukumar	Naga Chaitanya, Tamannaah Bhatia, Tara Alisha		
M A Y	13	Seema Tapakai	G. Nageshwar Reddy	Allari Naresh, Poorna		
M A Y	20	Veera	Ramesh Varma	Ravi Teja, Kajal Aggarwal, Taapsee Pannu		
M A Y	27	Dushasana	Posani Krishna Murali	Srikanth, Sanjana, Tashu Kaushik, Brahmanandam		
M A Y	27	Vykuntapali	Satyadeep Reddy	Krishnudu, Ajay, Ranadhir Reddy, Tashu Kaushik, Subbaraju		
J U N	3	Maaro	Siddique	Nitin, Meera Chopra, Abbas, Kota Srinivasa Rao		
J U N	3	Prema Sagaram	A. Majeed	Hasan, Shouri		
J U N	3	Babloo	Ravichandran Reddy	Mano Tej, Aditi Sharma, Mukul Dev		
J U N	10	Badrinath	V.V. Vinayak	Allu Arjun, Tamannaah Bhatia, Prakash Raj		
J U N	24	180	Jayendra	Siddharth, Nithya Menen, Priya Anand, Tanikella Bharani, Mouli, Geetha		
J U N	24	Nagaram Nidrapotunna Vela	Premraj	Jagapathi Babu, Charmee Kaur		

== July–December ==
Opening		Title	Director	Cast	Production house	Ref
J U L	1	Brahmi Gadi Katha	Eeshwar Reddy	Varun Sandesh, Asmita Sood, Poonam Kaur, Brahmanandam		
J U L	1	Virodhi	Neelakanta	Srikanth, Kamalini Mukherjee, Ajay		
J U L	16	Key	Nagendra Prasad	Jagapati Babu		
J U L	22	Amayakudu	Bharathi Ganesh	Krishnudu, Poonam Singar, Ananya	Produced by Octagon Movies	
J U L	22	Kodipunju	BVV Choudhary	Tanish, Anchal Sabharwal, Roja		
J U L	29	Sanchalanam	B V Ramana Reddy	Kamalakar, Saikumar, Supreet	Produced by Kamal Pictures	
A U G	12	Kandireega	Santosh Srinivas	Ram, Hansika Motwani, Sonu Sood, Aksha Pardasany		
A U G	12	Dhada	Ajay Bhuyan	Naga Chaitanya, Kajal Aggarwal, Samiksha, Sreeram, Brahmanandam, Kelly Dorjee		
A U G	19	Mugguru	V. N. Aditya	Navdeep, Sivaji, Shraddha Das, Srinivas Avasarala, Sanjana, Reema Sen		
A U G	26	Keratam	Gautam Patnaik	Siddharth Rajkumar, Rakul Preet Singh, Aishwarya		
A U G	26	Daggaraga Dooranga	Ravi Chavali	Sumanth, Vedhika		
A U G	26	Money Money, More Money	J. D. Chakravarthy	J. D. Chakravarthy, Gajala, Brahmanandam, Asha Saini		
S E P	6	Nenu Nanna Abaddam	Govind Varaha	Nandu, Divya, Archana		
S E P	9	Aakasame Haddu	Raavicharan	Navdeep, Rajeev Saluri, Panchi Bora		
S E P	16	Poru Telangana	R. Narayana Murthy	R. Narayana Murthy		
S E P	17	Vara Prasad Potti Prasad	Satya Varanasi	Srinivas Avasarala, Vijay Sai, Karina Shah, Priya Ahuja		
S E P	23	Dookudu	Srinu Vaitla	Mahesh Babu, Samantha Ruth Prabhu, Sonu Sood, Prakash Raj		
S E P	30	Madatha Kaja	Seetarama Raju	Allari Naresh, Sneha Ullal		
S E P	30	Cricket Girls & Beer	S. Umesh Kumar	Adarsh Balakrishna, Surya Tej, Naga Shourya, Sindhu Affan		
S E P	30	Vankaya Fry	Chandramouli	Sumith Arora, Anu Smrithi, Brahmanandam		
O C T	6	Oosaravelli	Surender reddy	N. T. Rama Rao Jr., Tamannaah, Shaam		
O C T	14	Pilla Zamindar	G. Ashok	Nani, Haripriya, Bindu Madhavi		
N O V	3	Nuvvila	Ravi Babu	Havish, Ajay, Prasad Barve, Vijay Sai, Yami Gautam, Sarayu, Remya Nambeesan		
N O V	4	Mogudu	Krishna Vamshi	Gopichand, Taapsee Pannu, Shraddha Das		
N O V	11	Oh My Friend	Venu Sriram	Siddarth, Shruti Haasan, Navdeep, Hansika Motwani		
N O V	11	It's My Love Story	Madhura Sreedhar	Arvind Krishna, Nikita Narayan, Jayasudha, Sarath Babu		
N O V	18	Sri Rama Rajyam	Bapu	Akkineni Nageswara Rao, Nandamuri Balakrishna, Srikanth, Nayantara, Jayasudha, K. R. Vijaya, Saikumar		
N O V	18	Veedu Theda	Chinni Krishna	Nikhil Siddharth, Pooja Bose		
N O V	25	Solo	Parashuram	Nara Rohit, Nisha Aggarwal, Prakash Raj		
D E C	2	Bejawada	Vivek Krishna	Naga Chaitanya, Amala Paul, Prabhu, Abhimanyu Singh, Mukul Dev, Ajay, Brahmanandam, Kota Srinivasa Rao		
D E C	9	Panjaa	Vishnuvardhan	Pawan Kalyan, Sarah Jane Dias, Jackie Shroff, Anjali Lavania, Adivi Sesh, Atul Kulkarni		
D E C	16	Priyudu	Shravan	Varun Sandesh, Preetika Rao, Shweta Prasad		
D E C	22	Rajanna	Vijayendra Prasad	Nagarjuna, Sneha, Shweta Menon, Baby Aney, Nassar, Pradeep Rawat		
D E C	30	Kshetram	T. Venugopal	Jagapathi Babu, Priyamani, Shaam		

== Notable deaths ==
Deaths of notable personalities this year
Month	Date	Name	Age	Profession	Notable films	Ref.
January	21	E. V. V. Satyanarayana	54	Director, producer, screenwriter	Nalugu Stambhalata, Rendu Jella Seetha, Nelavanka, Rendu Rella Aaru, Aha Naa Pellanta, Hai Hai Nayaka, Indrudu Chandrudu, Hello Brother, Alluda Majaka, Intlo Illalu Vantintlo Priyuralu, Goppinti Alludu, Varasudu	

== See also ==
- List of Telugu films of 2010
- Lists of Telugu-language films
- List of Telugu films of 2012

== General references ==
- Filmfare Awards 2012 Telugu winners list
