= Prakash Alex =

Indian composer and singer

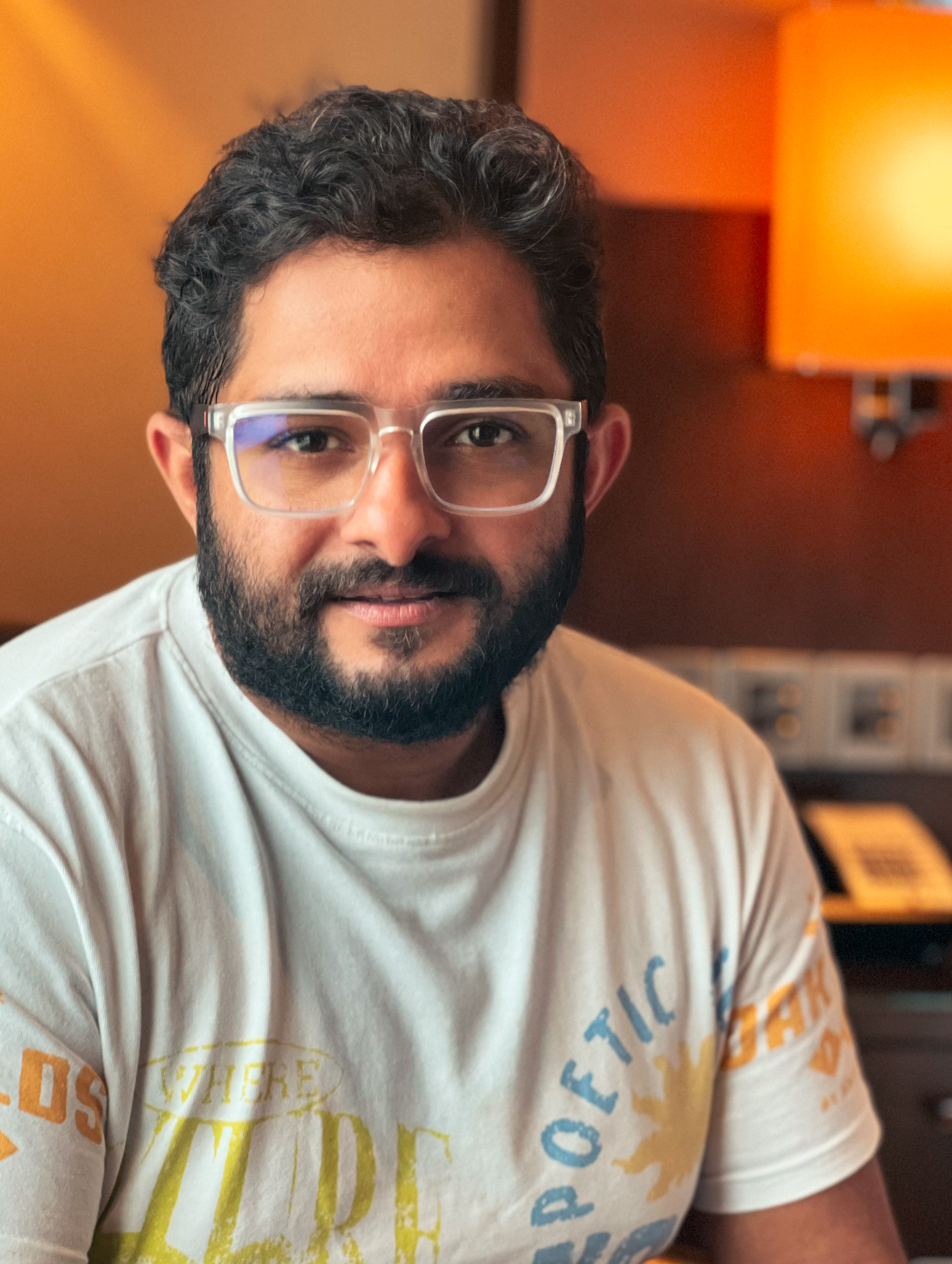

Background information
- Born: Mallappally, Kerala, India
- Occupations: Composer, singer
- Instruments: Keyboard, guitar
- Years active: 2018–present

Prakash Alex is an Indian composer and singer who primarily works in South Indian films.

== Early life ==
Prakash Alex was born to Reverend K. P. Alexander and Leelamma, a school teacher, in Pathanamthitta, India. He has an older brother, Prasanth Alexander, an actor in the Malayalam film industry, and two older sisters, Priya and Preethy.

Alex started learning piano at the age of 5, with his sister Preethy as his instructor. He was part of the choir team in his church. He later joined a multimedia course at St. Joseph College of Communication and started making music videos.

== Career ==
Prakash has worked in various languages, including Malayalam, Tamil, and Marathi. He started programming and producing songs for albums, devotionals, and short films in 2005. He began his career in the Malayalam industry as a music programmer for Siddarth Siva's short film Amour Code in 2006.

He made his debut as music director for the 2018 film, Kalyanam.

He has collaborated with musicians such as Poly Varghese, Stephen Devassy, Bijibal, Deepak Dev, and Mejo Joseph. He produced the song "Nenchodu Cherthu (Yuvvh)."

His films include Kalyanam (2018), and Qalb (2024). His songs include "Ektha Boss" from Shylock featuring Unni Mukundan, "Monjathi" from Qalb, and "Dhrithangapulakithan" featuring Dulquer Salmaan from Kalyanam.

== Personal life ==
Prakash is married to Renu. He composed their wedding video song. The couple resides in Ernakulam.

== Filmography ==
Years	Film	Language	Songs	Background Score
2018	Kalyanam	Malayalam	Yes	Yes
2018	Mohanlal	Malayalam	Yes	Yes
2019	Ulta	Malayalam	No	Yes
2019	Ratri Jha Pause	Marati	No	Yes
2020	Lona	Malayalam	Yes	Yes
2020	Soulmates	Malayalam	Yes	Yes
2020	Shylock	Malayalam	Yes	No
2021	Cold Case	Malayalam	Yes	Yes
2021	18Hours	Malayalam	Yes	Yes
2021	Khali Purse of Billionaires	Malayalam	Yes	Yes
2022	Varayan	Malayalam	Yes	Yes
2022	Paachil	Malayalam	Yes	Yes
2022	In	Malayalam	Yes	Yes
2023	Hope	Malayalam	Yes	Yes
2024	Qalb	Malayalam	Yes	Yes
2024	DNA	Malayalam	Yes	No

== Awards ==
28th State Television Award (2021) for Music direction – Tele Serial/Telefilm category for "Side Effect".
