= Annum Innum Ennum =

- Theatrical release poster
- Directed by: Rajesh Nair
- Written by: Rajesh Mohanan
- Produced by: Usha Rajesh; Kishor Nair
- Starring: Jishnu Raghavan; Nishan; Siddique; Fareisa Joemmanbaks; Tashu Kaushik; Radhika
- Cinematography: Prasanth Krishna
- Edited by: V SaaJan
- Music by: Varun Unni
- Production company: Vaya Films
- Release date: 18 January 2013
- Country: India
- Language: Malayalam

Annum Innum Ennum (English: Then, Now and Forever) is a 2013 Malayalam film directed and scripted by Rajesh Mohanan, starring Jishnu, Nishan, Siddique, Fareisa Joemmanbaks, Tashu Kaushik and Radhika. Produced by Usha Rajesh under the Vaya Films banner, the film was shot mostly in Thiruvananthapuram.

== Plot ==
The film revolves around a young married couple and their relationship at various levels. It illustrates the dry humour of how pretentious human relations can be and how there is a quid pro quo in all relations no matter how genuine they may seem. It deals with the irony of life.

== Cast ==
- Jishnu Raghavan as Shridhar Krishna alias Sri: Non-practiced doctor also Writer; Anjana's husband; Riya's ex-boyfriend
- Nishan as Roy Thomas: Radio Jockey; Anjana's one-sided lover
- Siddique as Sidharth Menon
- Radhika as Anjana alias Anju: Shridhar's wife; Roy's ex-love interest
- Tashu Kaushik as Riya: Shridhar's ex-girlfriend
- Rosin Jolly as Daisy
- Fareisa Joemmanbaks as Dolly
- Thilakan as Dr. Benjamin Bruno
- Rekha as Indu
- Ashokan as Thomas
- Arun as Niyaz
- Salim Kumar as Lopez
- Seema G. Nair as Clara
- Bijukuttan as Constable
- Nobi as Pauly

== Production ==
"Annun Innum Ennum is an all-generation movie from a new generation team. Through my movie, I am trying to explain about two generations, which are always at loggerheads with each other." - Rajesh Nair

The film's cast consists mostly of youngsters. Surinamese model and former Miss India-World Fareisa Joemmanbaks made her debut through this film. Rajesh Nair chose Bollywood actress Tashu Kaushik for an important role. Nair had promised her a role when both met in Uganda some three years before. About his role, Nishan, who rose to fame with Ee Adutha Kalathu says: "My role is of a guy who owns an ad agency and happy go lucky person."

The film's shooting commenced on 5 May 2012 in Trivandrum. The first schedule of filming completed on 15 May and took place entirely in the city of Trivandrum. The last schedule including songs will start on 22 June. The music for the movie was composed by Varun Unni. Although multiple tracks were initially composed for the film, only the title track "Ayyo" was used. Director Rajesh Nair commented that the other songs including "Peyyum Mazhayye" were being saved for his upcoming release Escape from Uganda which would star Rima Kallingal

== Reception ==
The film received mixed to positive reviews upon release. Veeyen of nowrunning.com rated the film 1.5/5 saying " The film finds itself lost somewhere in between being an adult comedy and a morality tale and it satisfies the enthusiasts of neither." Indiaglitz.com gave the movie a 4.5 rating saying "The movie tries to tell a little serious things and issues about love, sex, heartaches and fragile relationships from each one's life but is overly concerned with the male concupiscence in each of the cases" citing this as its shortcoming. The movie's uncanny title track "Ayyo vishaada meghamayi..." was well received by music buffs and the video of the song went viral on YouTube garnering over 50,000 views within the first few days of its release. Director Rajesh Nair and composer Varun Unni are expected to join forces again in the upcoming Rima Kallingal starrer Escape from Uganda.
