= Kothapallilo Okappudu =

2025 Indian Telugu-language film by Praveena Paruchuri

- Theatrical release poster
- Directed by: Praveena Paruchuri
- Story by: Guru Kiran Bathula
- Produced by: Gopalakrishna Paruchuri; Praveena Paruchuri; Rana Daggubati (presenter)
- Starring: Manoj Chandra; Monika T.; Usha Bonela; Ravindra Vijay; Banerjee; Babu Mohan; Satyam Rajesh
- Cinematography: Petros Antoniadis
- Edited by: Kiran R.
- Music by: Score: Varun Unni; Songs: Mani Sharma
- Production company: Paruchuri Vijaya Praveena Arts
- Release date: 18 July 2025
- Running time: 123 minutes
- Country: India
- Language: Telugu

Kothapallilo Okappudu (transl. Once upon a time in Kothapalli) is a 2025 Indian Telugu-language comedy drama film directed by Praveena Paruchuri. The film features Manoj Chandra, Monika T and Usha Bonela in lead roles.

The film was released on 18 July 2025.

== Plot ==
Ramakrishna works for a moneylender in the village of Kothapalli. He is in love with a girl named Savitri. Their friend Andham supports their relationship and tries to help them meet. One day, Ramakrishna plans to meet Savitri near a haystack, but unexpected events take place, causing problems for both of them. The rest of the story shows what happens next and how they deal with the situation.

== Cast ==
- Manoj Chandra as Ramakrishna
- Monika T as Savitri
- Usha Bonela as Aadhilakshmi "Andham"
- Ravindra Vijay as Appanna
- Banerjee as Reddy
- Bongu Satti as Satyam
- Phani as Chittibabu
- Prem Sagar Rajulapati as Gandubabu
- Praveena Paruchuri as Nagamani
- Babu Mohan as MLA
- Abhiram Mahankali as Junior Constable

== Music ==
The soundtrack is composed by Mani Sharma, while background score is composed by Varun Unni.

Track listing
No.	Title	Lyrics	Singer(s)	Length
1.	"Ranga Nayaki"	Chaitanya Prasad	Dhanunjay Seepana	4:00
2.	"Biscuit Biscuit"	Hareesh Chakravarthy	Sai Shivani	3:14
3.	"Yelo Yennello"	Kasarla Shyam	Ramya Behara	3:42
4.	"Jai Bolo"	Kasarla Shyam	Sweekar Agasthi, Ramya Behera	3:16
Total length:				14:12

== Release and reception ==
Kothapallilo Okappudu was released on 18 July 2025. Streaming on Aha Telugu OTT.

Sangeetha Devi Dundoo of The Hindu was positive with performances of the cast and stated, "They say destruction is easy and creation is hard. But what if the reverse were true? Kothapallilo Okappudu explores this inversion with conviction". BH Harsh of Cinema Express rated the film 3.5 out of 5 and praised the direction, cinematography and performances of the cast. The Times of India gave a rating of 2.5 out of 5 praising performances, and themes whereas criticizing its narration, and underdeveloped subplots.

== Awards ==
Award	Category	Recipient	Result	Ref.
2026 SIIMA Awards	Best Debut Director	Praveena Paruchuri	Nominated	
2026 SIIMA Awards	Best Debut Actor	Manoj Chandra	Nominated	
