= Thrissur Pooram (film) =

2019 film by Rajesh Mohanan

- Theatrical release poster
- Directed by: Rajesh Mohanan
- Written by: Ratheesh Vegha
- Produced by: Vijay Babu
- Starring: Jayasurya; Swathi Reddy; Sabumon Abdusamad
- Cinematography: R. D. Rajasekhar
- Edited by: Deepu Joseph
- Music by: Ratheesh Vegha
- Production company: Friday Film House
- Distributed by: Friday Tickets
- Release date: 20 December 2019 (India)
- Running time: 152 minutes
- Country: India
- Language: Malayalam

Thrissur Pooram (transl. Thrissur fest) is a 2019 Indian Malayalam-language action film directed by Rajesh Mohanan and written by Ratheesh Vegha who also composed the music. It stars Jayasurya, Swathi Reddy, Sabumon Abdusamad, Vijay Babu, Sudev Nair, T.G. Ravi, Sreejith Ravi, Manikuttan, Indrans, Sudheer Karamana, Sadiq, Valsala Menon, and Mallika Sukumaran. The film follows the tale of the young gangster, Pullu Giri, in the city of Thrissur.

The film was produced by Vijay Babu under the banner of Friday Film House and was released on 20 December 2019 and was an average grosser at the box office.

== Plot ==
Pullu Giri becomes a juvenile criminal at the age of 10 after he murders his mother's killer who accidentally slits Giri's Mother's throat instead of Rajalakshmi. His modus operandi is to stab with a rabies infected knife. After his mother's death, he is raised by Rajalakshmi alias Vakkeelamma, an esteemed criminal lawyer of Thrissur.

At present, Giri is a former gangster who lives peacefully by running his own bottled water company in Thrissur and is married to Veni and bears a daughter. He occasionally has brushes with the cops as the city police commissioner, Raman Moorthy, keeps an eye on him. Thrissur is currently donned by two gangster brothers, Shyam Rangan and Sudeep, who are gold smugglers and real estate mafias. Giri gets dragged back into crime when his friend, Balan, gets in trouble after renting a car to gold smugglers working for Sudeep.

Sudeep kills Balan who has gone to explain his innocence. Enraged, Giri plans and kills Sudeep by faking a road accident. Shyam vows revenge on Giri, who along with his friend Teja, orchestrates the kidnap of Veni and strips her naked in the busy market. He also burns down Giri's water-bottling plant. Veni requests Giri to avenge the humiliation. Giri gets hold of Teja and extracts information on the next gold consignment worth ₹100 crore. He captures the gold, smuggles it back to Kerala in a KSRTC bus, and stabs Teja with a rabies infected knife.

Giri surrenders the gold to Moorthy, and Shyam orders a hit on Giri, who is attacked by a large group of hitmen. Though Giri manages to defeat the attackers, he is betrayed by his trusted lieutenant who stabs and leaves him to die. His other lieutenants, Alli and Murugan, find and kill the betrayer while Shyam learns that Giri is alive. With his business empire crumbling due to the lost gold, Shyam seeks a compromise with Giri on his lawyer's advice. Shyam and his lawyer meet the limping Giri in a local tea stall. While they meet, the tea stall owner kills Shyam as he killed his son in a hit-and-run case. In the aftermath, Giri resumes his peaceful life.

== Cast ==
- Jayasurya as "Pullu" Giri
  - Adwaith Jayasurya as Young Giri
- Swathi Reddy as Krishnaveni
- Sabumon Abdusamad as Shyam Rangan
- Vijay Babu as Commissioner Raman Moorthy IPS
- T. G. Ravi as Vettoli Balan
- Mallika Sukumaran as Advocate Rajalakshmi (Vakkeelamma)
- Manikuttan as Alli
- Murugan as Sugreevan
- Binoy Nambola as Veru
- Sudev Nair as Sudeep Rangan
- Sreejith Ravi as SI Anand
- Sadiq as Sub Registrar George
- Govind Krishna as Rakesh
- Indrans as Murugan (Tea Shop Owner)
- Manesh Kumar
- Sudheer Karamana as SI Syed
- Hariprashanth M G as Edakkadan John
- Dr. Shaju as SI Kumar
- Vineeth Thattil David as SI Siby
- Jayaraj Warrier as Paulachan
- John Kaipallil as Teja
- Balachandran Chullikkadu as Jayamohan, Rangan brother's advocate
- Gayatri Arun as Giri's mother
- Valsala Menon as Veni's grandmother
- Saiju Kurup as Doctor (cameo appearance)

== Production ==
Actor Jayasurya and producer Vijay Babu of Friday Film House were planning to associate together for a number of films after collaborating for Aadu and Aadu 2 and this was announced as a major project in their line up. The film was touted as a mass entertainer and was announced that the story was narrated in several chapters, each named after the various stages of the pooram, such as Kodiyettam and Vedikettu.

The film was shot in Thrissur, Hyderabad, and Coimbatore. Shoot officially commenced on 15 July 2019.

== Music ==
Thrissur Pooram

Soundtrack album to Thrissur Pooram by Ratheesh Vegha
- Released: 2019
- Recorded: 2019
- Genre: Feature film soundtrack
- Length: 25:43
- Language: Malayalam
- Producer: Ratheesh Vegha

Ratheesh Vegha chronology
Kingfish (2019)	Thrissur Pooram (2019)	..... (2019)

Ratheesh Vegha composed the background score for the film's songs.

== Release ==
The film was released on 20 December 2019.
