= Suraj: The Rising Star =

Animated television series

- Genre: Drama
- Based on: Star of the Giants by Ikki Kajiwara
- Voices of: Nachiket Dighe
- Countries of origin: India; Japan
- No. of seasons: 1
- No. of episodes: 26

Production
- Production companies: Kodansha; TMS Entertainment; DQ Entertainment

Original release
- Network: Colors TV
- Release: 23 December 2012 – 16 June 2013

Suraj: The Rising Star is an Indian animated television series presented by Kodansha, TMS Entertainment and DQ Entertainment. It is based on the Japanese animated series Star of the Giants and it aired on Colors TV. This series premiered on 23 December 2012.

== Voice cast ==
- Nachiket Dighe as Suraj
