= Tashu Kaushik =

Indian actress and model

- Born: Kanpur, Uttar Pradesh, India
- Occupations: Film actress, model
- Years active: 2006–present

Tashu Kaushik is an Indian actress and model. She was earlier seen in films like Raju Maharaju, Dushasana, Vaikuntapali and Graduate. She started career as a stage choreographer. From stage shows, Tashu moved on to films through Ram Gopal Varma's Darwaaza Bandh Rakho.

== Early life ==
Tashu Kaushik was born in Kanpur, Uttar Pradesh, to Rakesh Goud, a businessman. Her family moved to Mumbai in her childhood. She has appeared in many commercials over the years and has acted in a Bollywood film called Zoom.

== Career ==
Tashu Kaushik has completed shooting for Telugabbai opposite Tanish. "My character in the film is a girl who is born and brought up abroad and is a model by profession. It's a glamorous character and you can see me in an all-new contemporary look in the movie," says Tashu. The actress is also playing the leading lady opposite Sri of Eerojullo fame in Doola Seenu directed by Raj Kandukoori. She adds that her look in the entertainer will be a stark contrast to her role in Telugabbai. "In this movie, my character is a homely one and I'll be sporting saris mostly," she says. Her third film is Mike Testing 143, where she will be paired opposite Taraka Ratna.

She made her debut in Malayalam films with Rajesh Nair's Annum Innum Ennum. and in Kannada cinema in Cool Ganesha in 2013. She has signed up for her first Tamil film — Pazhaya Vannarapettai. Talking about Pazhaya Vannara Pettai Tashu says, "The movie is important to me because I get to play the role of a traditional girl who is always dressed in half-saris and salwars- a stark contrast to my glam doll stereotype in Tollywood."

She has her eyes set on filmmaking too and want to direct film in the next 10 years. She was running her own restaurant in Versova in Mumbai when her first Telugu film offer came to her.

== Filmography ==
Year	Film	Role	Language	Notes
2006	Darwaaza Bandh Rakho	Sheeba K. Shah	Hindi	
2010	Raju Maharaju	Bindu	Telugu	
2011	Dushasana		Telugu	
2011	Vykuntapali	Snigdha	Telugu	
2011	Graduate	Manisha	Telugu	
2013	Annum Innum Ennum	Riya	Malayalam	
2013	Telugabbai	Megha	Telugu	
2013	Gola Seenu	Sandhya	Telugu	
2013	Cool Ganesha	Swapna	Kannada	
2013	Escape from Uganda	Angel Mathews	Malayalam	
2013	Pazhaya Vannarapettai		Tamil	
2013	Reporter	Maya	Telugu	Filming
