= Rajesh Nair =

Indian film director

- Occupation: Director

Rajesh Mohanan also credited as Rajesh Nair is a film director in Malayalam film industry.

== Career ==
His first film was Annum Innum Ennum (2013), the second one was Escape from Uganda (2013) and the last one was in Salt Mango Tree (2015) with Biju Menon in lead.

== Filmography ==
Year	Title	Director	Producer	Notes
2013	Annum Innum Ennum	Yes	Yes	
2013	Escape from Uganda	Yes	Yes	
2015	Salt Mango Tree	Yes	No	
2018	Kalyanam	Yes	Yes	
2019	Thrissur Pooram	Yes	No	
2021	Eighteen Hours	Yes	Yes	
2022	Inn	Yes	Yes	
2027	Harivarasanam †	Yes	No	
