= Kempegowda 2 =

2019 film directed by Shankar Gowda

- Directed by: Shankar Gowda
- Screenplay by: Shrinath M. S., K. V. Raju, Nanjunda
- Story by: Shankar Gowda
- Produced by: A. Vinodh
- Starring: Komal Kumar
- Cinematography: Rosh Mohan - Karthik
- Edited by: Ravichandra
- Music by: Varun Unni
- Production company: Panchamukhi Hanuman Cine Productions
- Release date: 9 August 2019
- Country: India
- Language: Kannada

Kempegowda 2 is a 2019 Kannada action film directed by Shankar Gowda. The film stars Komal Kumar and Rakshika Sharma in lead roles alongside Sreeshanth and Yogesh in supporting roles. The film was produced by A. Vinodh under Panchamukhi Hanuman Cine Productions. The film's soundtrack was composed by Varun Unni. Despite the title, the film is not a sequel to the 2011 film of same name and is a namesake sequel. The film was dubbed in Telugu as Yamadheera in 2024.

== Cast ==
- Komal Kumar as Kempe Gowda
- Rakshika Sharma
- Sreeshanth as Deshmukh
- Yogesh
- Nagendra Babu as Police commissioner
- Ali as Deshmukh's relative
- Madhusudhan Rao as MLA
- Viji Chandrasekhar
- Satya Prakash as Police officer

== Production ==
The film featured Komal Kumar in a serious role of a cop, for the first time completely different from comedic roles which he was known for. He agreed to do this role as 'he was getting tired of being typecast as a comedian' and had to lose weight around 23 kilos to look the part. The film marked the acting debut of Sreesanth in Kannada film industry.

== Music ==
The original songs and background score of the film were composed by Varun Unni.

- "Usire" - Varun Unni, Supriya Lohith
- "Kempe Gowda" - Patla Sathish Shetty, Zia Ul Haq

== Reception ==
Times of India wrote "While the story is inspiring, the edit could have helped land the final punch more adequately. If you are a fan of cop-oriented action dramas, Kempegowda 2 might just be your cup of tea". Bangalore Mirror wrote "What is not good is the slow-paced narrative. It would not feel slow if the thrills and twists were more pronounced. The film tries to take itself seriously This was unnecessary as in any such film, it is entertainment that should take precedence. Despite this flaw, Kempegowda 2 is a good watch".
