= Varun Unni =

Indian composer and singer (born 1989)

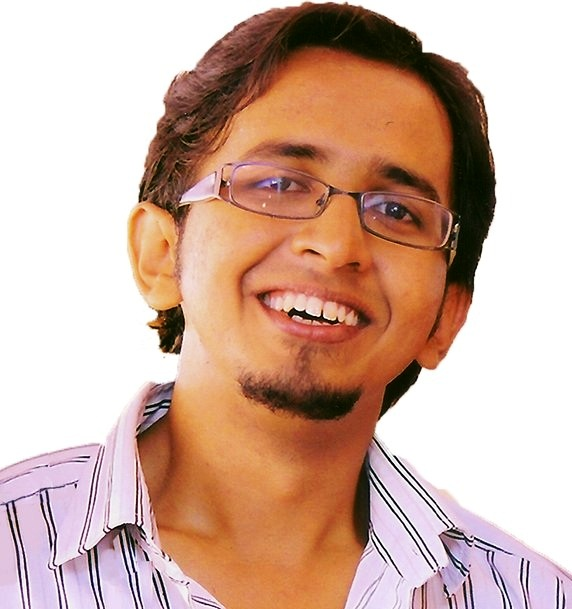

Background information
- Born: Kochi, Kerala, India
- Genres: Film score; OST; soundtrack; jazz; rock; blues; Indian music; Hindustani music
- Occupations: Film composer; music director; singer
- Instruments: Keyboard; piano; drums
- Years active: 2012–present
- Spouse: Devika Ashok (m. 2019)

Varun Unni is an Indian composer and singer, who predominantly composes for television commercials. He has also composed for a few feature films, having debuted with the 2012 Malayalam film Annum Innum Ennum.

== Early life and career ==
Varun Unni was born on 15 July 1989 in Kochi, Kerala. He did his schooling at Chinmaya Vidyalaya, Vaduthala in Kochi and went on to graduate from engineering at Adi Shankara College of Engineering, Kalady.

Although devoid of any background in films, Varun's first priority was always film music. After training at Kalabhavan, he went on to work with bands like Highway Haze and Flying Squad. He lists Bob Marley, Eric Clapton, Hans Zimmer and A. R. Rahman as his greatest influences.

== Film composing career ==
Though his debut film bombed at the box office, Varun's debut work "Ayyo" from Annum Innum Ennum was noticed. His second film with the same team failed again at the box-office. He shifted focus to composing jingles for advertisement films and associated with famous brands like Chemmanur and MCR. In 2017, he was offered the Kannada film Kempegowda-2, a spin-off of Kempe Gowda, the Kannada remake of Singam. The film opened to a favourable response and Varun subsequently signed more films in Kannada, including Kongka Pass with the same team. However he shifted focus to jingles until 2025, when he signed four films, each in Malayalam, Tamil, Telugu and Kannada.

== Music videos ==
=== Smile ===
In 2013, Varun produced a social cause album titled Smile featuring five singles by Shwetha Mohan as well as songs by upcoming singers Suchith Suresan and Yazin Nizar. It was released by the indie music label Tune4 Music.

=== Second Rain ===
In 2017, Varun Unni composed the music for the music movie Second Rain (Peyyum Mazhaye), produced and directed by Lijo Augustin, with cinematography by A. Kumaran of Thanga Magan fame.

The video also featured Arundhati, who starred in the Tamil film Saithan. The lyrics and video of the song narrate a tale of romance where rain acts as the predominant backdrop to important moments in the love story of a young couple. The video also features a short climactic fight sequence, for which Varun composed the background score.

The song was released via Muzik 247. The vocals were by Shweta Mohan and Ranjith, with programming by Ashwin Sivadas.

== Return to feature films ==
As of 2025, Varun has signed films Malayalam, Tamil and Telugu and Kannada languages. His first release of 2025 was the Tamil film The Door, directed by Jaiidev starring Bhavana in the lead role. His next was the Kannada film Rakshasa starring Prajwal Devaraj. Both films tanked at the box-office. His third release, the Malayalam film Azadi opened to mixed reviews, but the music received an overwhelmingly positive response. Varun was praised for elevating the movie experience to another level with his background score.

== Film discography ==
Year	Film	Language	Songs	Background score	Notes
2013	Annum Innum Ennum	Malayalam	Yes	No	One song
2013	Escape from Uganda	Malayalam	Yes	No	Three songs
2019	Kempegowda 2	Kannada	Yes	Yes	Kannada debut Spin-off of Kempe Gowda, the Kannada remake of Singam
2025	The Door	Tamil	Yes	Yes	Tamil debut.
2025	Rakshasa	Kannada	Yes	No	
2025	Azadi	Malayalam	Yes	Yes	
2025	Kothapallilo Okappudu	Telugu	No	Yes	
