= Ram Leela (2015 Telugu film) =

- Poster
- Directed by: Sripuram Kiran
- Produced by: Dasari Kiran Kumar
- Starring: Havish; Abijeet; Nanditha
- Cinematography: S. Gopal Reddy
- Music by: Chinna
- Production company: Rama Dhootha Creations
- Release date: 27 February 2015
- Country: India
- Language: Telugu

Ram Leela is a 2015 Indian Telugu-language romantic comedy film directed by Sripuram Kiran, featuring Havish, Abijeet, and Nanditha in the lead roles. The film received poor reviews and failed to perform at the box office.

== Plot ==
Krish (Abhijith) is a software professional in the US. One fine day, he comes across Sasya (Nanditha) on TV and falls in love with her. Krish comes back to India and somehow convinces Sasya to marry him. The couple head to Malaysia for their honeymoon. Twist in the tale arises when Sasya leaves Krish and decides to meet her ex-boyfriend. Rest of the story is as to how Krish manages to win his wife back and where does Ram (Havish) future in all this set up.

== Cast ==
- Havish as Ram
- Abijeet as Krish
- Nanditha as Sasya
- Bhanu Chander
- Saptagiri as Ram's friend
- Ali
- Anitha
- Krishnudu
- Viva Harsha as Exorcist
- Nagineedu as Sasya's father (Cameo appearance)
- Madalsa Sharma as an item number

== Production ==
The film began production in November 2014 and ended in December of the same year. The film was shot for 38 days in Malaysia and India.

== Soundtrack ==
Songs composed by Chinna.

- "Yemaindho Yegere" - Deepak, Shravya
- "Nuvvuleni"- Deepak
- "Bhajana Bhajana" - Simha
- "Puvvulona Nuvve" - Malavika, Monisha, Ranjith
- "Manasuloni Maata" - Deepak
- Music Bit - Malavika, Rakesh, Sivamani

== Release and reception ==
The film released on 27 February 2015. This film was not profitable at the box office.

=== Critical reception ===
Sangeetha Devi Dundoo of The Hindu wrote that "Give this a miss and re-visit Sanjay Leela Bhansali’s blockbuster of the same name instead. " The Times of India wrote that "Director Sripuram Kiran effectively drives home the point that marital bond is more important than an involvement with any person". A review in News 18 stated "Nanditha, who shined with her performance in films like Prema Katha Chitram, 'Lovers', fails to impress here."
