= Nachiket Dighe =

Indian actor

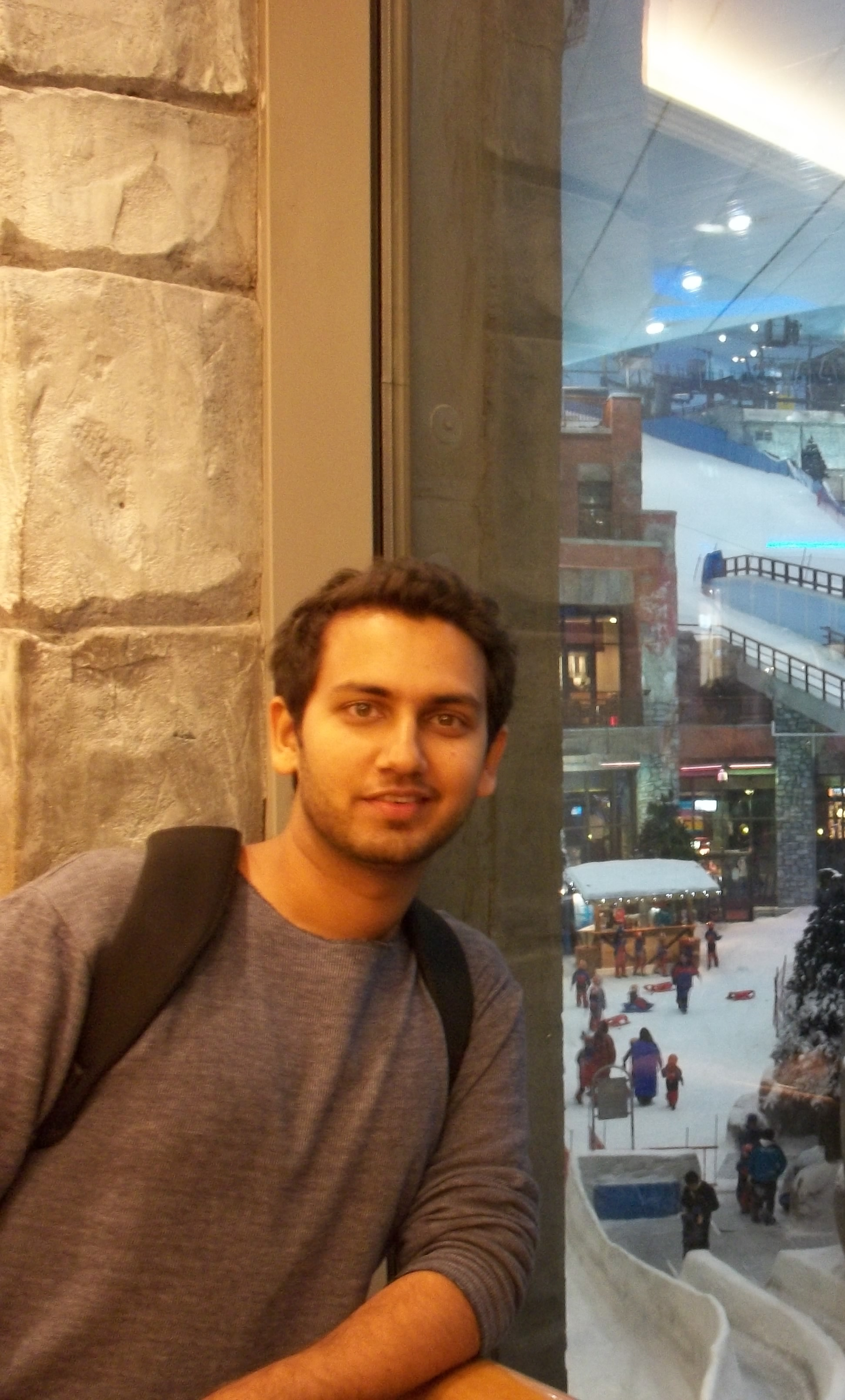
- Nachiket Dighe in November, 2011
- Born: 11 November 1987 (age 38); Mumbai, Maharashtra, India
- Occupation: Actor
- Years active: 1993–present
- Spouse: Rucha Dighe

Nachiket Dighe (born 11 November 1987) is an Indian actor, who dubs in Hindi, Marathi, and English. He dubbed Rupert Grint's role as Ron Weasley in Hindi, in the Harry Potter film series.

He voiced the characters Buford Van Stomm and Jeremy Johnson in the Hindi dubbed version of the animated show Phineas and Ferb and is the Hindi voice of Kenji (Tracey Sketchit) (Pokémon Chronicles) in the first Hindi dub of the Pokémon anime, and Satoshi (Ash Ketchum) in Disney's second Hindi dub of the same.

== Personal life ==
After completing Bachelors in Engineering, Nachiket did his post-graduation with MBA in Marketing from Mumbai University. He is Sangeet Visharad in Tabla from Gandharva Mahavidyalaya and has taken training in Hindustani classical music, vocals.

== Acting career ==
Nachiket Dighe started his acting career in sixth grade. As a child artist Nachiket acted in various advertisements and serials. His first serial Meethi Meethi Batein was a sitcom starring Sachin Pilgaonkar, Nirmiti Sawant, Niki Aneja Walia, Neha Pendse and Niyati Rajwade and aired 52 episodes for a year on DD National.

He played the character of Bipin Bukalwar in Lagi Sharth, and Wrong Mauritius both movies of Children's Film Society, India. He played the son of Vikram Gokhale and Neena Kulkarni in the 2002 multi-starrer Marathi feature film Aadharstambha which included prominent actors from the Marathi film industry like Dilip Prabhavalkar, Lakshmikant Berde, Sandeep Kulkarni and Atul Parchure.

== Dubbing career ==
Nachiket Dighe started his career of voice-dubbing foreign media at the age of 11 in January 1999, by voicing cartoons, animation and live series in Hindi for various channels. He was the approved Hindi voice for T.J. Detweiler in Recess, Jimmy Neutron in The Adventures of Jimmy Neutron: Boy Genius, Tino in Disney Weekenders and Eddie in Lloyd in Space. In anime, he was the Hindi voice of Tracey Sketchit (Kenji) in the Pokémon anime of the first Hindi dub by Sound & Vision India from early 2003 until late 2013. In 2014, a second Hindi dub has been made in-house by UTV Software Communications for Hungama TV where he was hired to voice, Ash Ketchum (Satoshi) in that dub.

== Filmography ==
=== Films ===
Year	Film title	Role	Language
2001	Lagi Sharth	Bipin Bukalwar	Hindi
2002	Aadharstambha	Rohan Divekar	Marathi
2004	Wrong Mauritius	Bipin Bukalwar	Hindi

=== Television series ===
Serial	Character role(s)	Number of episodes	Language	Channel	Notes
Meethi Meethi Batein		52	Hindi	DD National	
Aahat		2	Hindi	Sony Entertainment Television (India)	
Shree Ganesh		2	Hindi	Sony Entertainment Television (India)	
Avinash IPS		2	Hindi	Star Plus	
Shakalaka Boom Boom		3	Hindi	Star Plus	

=== Animated series ===
Airdate	Program title	Role	Language	Episodes	Notes
12/23/2012-06/16/2013	Suraj: The Rising Star	Suraj	Hindi	26	Initially Aired on Colors (TV channel) followed by Nickelodeon India.

== Dubbing roles ==
=== Animated series ===
Program title	Original voice(s)	Character(s)	Dub language	Original language	Number of episodes	Original airdate	Dubbed airdate	Notes
Recess	Ross Malinger (Season 1); Andrew Lawrence (Season 2–6)	T.J. Detweiler	Hindi	English	127+4 movies	8/31/1997- 11/5/2001	2000-2004	Aired on Disney Hour on the Sony Channel from 2000 to 2004. Repeats of the Hindi dub continued to air on Disney Channel until 2011.
The Weekenders	Jason Marsden	Tino	Hindi	English	39	4/18/1999- 2/29/2004		
Lloyd in Space	Justin Shenkarow	Eddie	Hindi	English	40	2/3/2001- 2/27/2004		
The Adventures of Jimmy Neutron: Boy Genius	Debi Derryberry	Jimmy Neutron	Hindi	English	119 (dubbed 68)	7/20/2002- 7/6/2007		Nachiket dubbed Jimmy Neutron for 68 episodes.
Famous 5: On the Case	Lizzie Waterworth (1-2); Skandar Keynes (3-5) (English); Alexandre Nguyen (French)	Dylan Kirrin	Hindi	English; French	43	4/5/2008-Current	11/17/2008-1/2010 (stopped)	
The Secret Saturdays	Sam Lerner	Zak Saturday	Hindi	English	36	10/3/2008- 1/30/2010		
Phineas and Ferb	Bobby Gaylor, Mitchel Musso	Buford Van Stomm, Jeremy Johnson (Phineas and Ferb)	Hindi; Marathi	English	204 (dubbed 114)	8/17/2007-Current		Voiced Bufford and Jeremy in Hindi throughout 90 episodes, and reprised his role to voice the same characters in the Marathi dub.
Kick Buttowski: Suburban Daredevil	Danny Cooksey	Bradley "Brad" Buttowski	Hindi; Marathi	English	46	2/13/2010-Current	5/8/2010-Current	Voiced Bradley in Hindi, and reprised his role to voice him in the Marathi dub.
Generator Rex	Fred Savage	Noah Nixon	Hindi	English	40	4/23/2008-1/3/2013	1/16/2011-Current	
Special Agent Oso (Season 2)	Sean Astin	Special Agent Oso	Hindi	English	38 [Episode 26–63]	4/4/2009- 5/17/2002		
Storm Hawks	Matt Hill	Finn	Hindi	English	52	5/25/2007- 4/6/2009		
Lego Ninjago: Masters of Spinjitzu	Vincent Tong	Kai (Red Ninja)	Hindi	English	28	1/14/2011- 4/12/2012		This show aired on Nickelodeon Sonic and on Cartoon Network India and only 28 episodes of the show aired on those channels in 2011 and 2012 (including the two pilot episodes, "Way of the Ninja" and "King of Shadows" and all of the episodes of Season 1 of Ninjago, "Rise of the Snakes"), but starting from 25 May 2021 – 30 January 2022, they started airing all episodes of Ninjago from seasons 2-15 on that same channel and on Cartoon Network India with a unknown Hindi dubbing cast for all the new villains in seasons 2-15 of the show. Dighe also reprised his role to voice Kai in the Urdu dub of this show.
Sally Bollywood	Eve Morey (English); Alexandre Nguyen (French)	Doowee	Hindi	English; French	52	10/26/2009- Current		
Spider-Man Unlimited	Rino Romano	Peter Parker/Spider-Man	Hindi	English	13	2 October 1999 – 31 March 2001		Aired by Disney XD.

=== Anime ===
Program title	Original Japanese voice(s)	Character(s)	Dub language	Episodes	Original airdate	Dubbed airdate	Notes
Pokémon	First Dub; Tomokazu Seki; Masakazu Morita; Tetsuya Kakihara (JP); Ted Lewis (Seasons 2–8); Craig Blair (Season 9-); Lucien Dodge; Tom Wayland (EN) second dub Rica Matsumoto (JP); Veronica Taylor(Seasons 1–8); Sarah Natochenny (Seasons 9-); Kayzie Rogers (Special) (EN)	First Dub; Tracey Sketchit (Kenji); Chili (Pod); Reggie (Reiji) second dub Ash Ketchum (Satoshi)	Hindi	1000+	4/1/1997-Current	First Dub 5/12/2003-2015 (India); 2004-2013 (Pakistan) second dub 5/19/2014-Current	The First 8 seasons dubbed, were based on the 4Kids Entertainment English dub. The later seasons were also dubbed in Hindi and are also revised translations based on the English dub. A Second Hindi dub has been produced by UTV Software Communications featuring a new Hindi voice cast and translation and aired on Hungama TV with Dighe being chosen to voice Ash in the second dub. The first dub that Dighe was also involved in, was produced by Sound and Vision India for Cartoon Network India, Cartoon Network Pakistan and Pogo. Prasad Barve was the voice of Ash in the first Hindi dub. Anshul Chandra voiced Tracey in the second Hindi dub.
Battle B-Daman	Hiro Yuuki; Tomo Saeki	Cain McDonnell Ruth; Sigma	Hindi		1/5/2004- 12/27/2004		
Heroman	Ryōhei Kimura	Simon "Psy" Kaina	Hindi		4/1/2010- 9/23/2010		
Digimon Frontier	Masato Amada	J.P., Beetlemon, MetalKabuterimon	Hindi		4/7/2002- 3/3/0/2003		
Scan2Go	Mitsuki Saiga	Antares	Hindi		8/9/2010- 03/29/2011	2013 - Present	
Idaten Jump	Mokoto Tsumura (JP); Philece Sampler (EN)	Kakeru Sakamaki	Hindi		10/1/2005- 09/09/2006	1/2014 - Present	A revised translation of the English dub.
Ganbare, Kickers!	Kazue Ikura	Masaru Hongō	Hindi		10/15/1986- 3/25/1987	2013- Present	Aired as Kickers in the Hindi dub.
Ojamajo Doremi	Nanaho Katsuragi	Igarashi-senpei	Hindi		2/7/1999- 1/30/2000		

=== Television series ===
Program title	Actor(s)	Character(s)	Dub language	Original language	Original airdate	Dubbed airdate	Notes
Power Rangers Zeo	Tom-Tim-Ted Fillipo (DiFillipo Triplets)	Trey of Trifortia / Zeo Gold Ranger	Hindi	English	20 April 1996 – 27 November 1996		Based on Japanese Tokusatsu, Chouriki Sentai Ohranger
Jonas	Kevin Jonas	Kevin Jonas	Hindi	English	5/2/2009-10/3/2010	11/30/2009-2011(?)	
Power Rangers RPM	Milo Cawthorne	Ziggy Grover / Ranger Operator Series Green	Hindi	English	7 March 2009 – 26 December 2009		Based on Japanese Tokusatsu, Engine Sentai Go-onger.
Power Rangers Samurai/Super Samurai	Najee De-Tiege	Kevin Douglas / Samurai Blue Ranger	Hindi	English	7 February 2011 – 10 December 2011 (Samurai) 18 February 2012 – 15 December 2012 (Super Samurai)		Based on Japanese Tokusatsu, Samurai Sentai Shinkenger
Power Rangers Megaforce/Super Megaforce	Cameron Jebo	Orion / Super Megaforce Silver Ranger	Hindi	English	2 February 2013 – 7 December 2013 (Megaforce) 15 February 2014 – 22 November 2014 (Super Megaforce)		Based on Japanese Tokusatsu, Tensou Sentai Goseiger & Kaizoku Sentai Gokaiger
Legends of the Hidden Temple	Various Characters	–	Hindi	English	9/11/1993- 9/11/1995		Children's game show that originally aired in North America from 1993 to 1995. Aired in the early 2000s decade.
Power Rangers Dino Charge/Super Charge	Brennan Mejia	Tyler Navarro / Dino Charge Red Ranger	Hindi	English	2/7/2015-12/10/2016		Based on Tokusatsu, Zyuden Sentai Kyoryuger.
Wizards of Waverly Place	Daniel Samonas	Dean Moriarty	Hindi	English	10/12/2007-1/6/2012	5/5/2008-2012(?)	
Sharpe	Lyndon Davies	Rifleman Ben Perkins	Hindi	English	5/5/1993- 11/9/2008		
Naturally, Sadie	Michael D'Ascenzo	Rainbow "Rain" Papadakis	Hindi	English	6/24/2005-8/26/2007		Aired on Disney Channel India.
Backyard Science	Various Characters	–	Hindi	English	2005-????		
The Nightmare Room	Shia LaBeouf	Dylan Pierce	Hindi	English	8/31/2001- 3/16/2002		Episode: Scareful What You Wish For
The Suite Life of Zack & Cody	Dennis Bendersky	Tapeworm	Hindi	English	3/18/2005- 9/1/2008		
Lonely Planet Six Degrees	Toby Amies	Himself	Hindi	English	2003-2012		Travel series.
The Rough Guides	Toby Amies	Himself	Hindi	English	2008-		Travel series.
The Elephant Princess	Jordan Prosser	Johan Abu	Hindi	English	11/13/2008- 10/6/2011		Appeared in two episodes. Aired on Disney Channel India.
Life with Derek	Kit Weyman	Samuel "Sam" Richards	Hindi	English	9/18/2005- 3/25/2009		Aired on Disney Channel India.
Kamen Rider: Dragon Knight	Mike Moh	Danny Cho, Hunt, Kamen Rider Axe	Hindi	English	1/13/2009- 12/26/2009	1/8/2010- 10/8/2010	Aired on Cartoon Network. Based on Japanese Tokusatsu, Kamen Rider Ryuki.
Aaron Stone	Philip Nozuka	Freddie	Hindi	English	2/13/2009- 7/30/2010	11/14/2009- 2010(?)	

=== Films ===
Film title	Actor(s)	Character(s)	Dub language	Original language	Original Year release	Dub Year release	Notes
Harry Potter and the Chamber of Secrets	Rupert Grint	Ron Weasley	Hindi	English	2002	2003	Voiced this character from the second onwards after it was passed from a female voice actress, Rupali Surve Shivtarkar.
Harry Potter and the Prisoner of Azkaban	Rupert Grint	Ron Weasley	Hindi	English	2004	2004	
Harry Potter and the Goblet of Fire	Rupert Grint	Ron Weasley	Hindi	English	2005	2005	
Harry Potter and the Order of the Phoenix	Rupert Grint	Ron Weasley	Hindi	English	2007	2007	
Harry Potter and the Half Blood Prince	Rupert Grint	Ron Weasley	Hindi	English	2009	2009	
Harry Potter and the Deathly Hallows – Part 1	Rupert Grint	Ron Weasley	Hindi	English	2010	2010	
Harry Potter and the Deathly Hallows – Part 2	Rupert Grint	Ron Weasley	Hindi	English	2011	2011	
Deep Impact	Elijah Wood	Leo Biederman (Second Dub)	Hindi	English	1998	2009	Nachiket has dubbed for the second dub released on a newer Home media Release. A first Hindi dub was previously released back in 1998 by Sound & Vision India.
Spy Kids 3-D: Game Over	Ryan Pinkston	Arnold	Hindi	English	2003	2003	
The Santa Clause	David Krumholtz	Bernard the Head Elf	Hindi	English	1994	2005	VCD/DVD Release.
The Santa Clause 2	David Krumholtz	Bernard the Arch-elf	Hindi	English	2002	2006	VCD/DVD Release.
Encino Man	Sean Astin	Dave Morgan	Hindi	English	1992	2009	
Remember the Titans	Ryan Gosling	DB Alan Bosley	Hindi	English	2000	2009	
Croc	Scott Hazell	Theo	Hindi	English	2007	2009	
National Lampoon's Van Wilder: The Rise of Taj	Anthony Cozens	Gethin	Hindi	English	2006	2009	
Just Friends	Chris Marquette	Mike Brander	Hindi	English	2005	2008	
Jack Frost	Taylor Handley	Rory Buck	Hindi	English	1998	2008	
Swing Kids	Christian Bale	Thomas Berger	Hindi	English	1993	2008	VCD/DVD Release.
Sorority Boys	Tony Denman	Jimmy	Hindi	English	2002	2008	
Minutemen	Steven R. McQueen	Derek	Hindi	English	2008	2008	
Honey, I Blew Up the Kid	Robert Oliveri	Nick Szalinski	Hindi	English	1992	2001	
Twitches Too	Chris Gallinger	Demitri	Hindi	English	2007	2007	
Tadpole	Robert Iler	Charlie	Hindi	English	2002	2008	Dubbed for television broadcasting on UTV.
Teenage Mutant Ninja Turtles II: The Secret of the Ooze	Ernie Reyes, Jr.	Keno	Hindi	English	1991	2006	VCD/DVD release.
License to Drive	Michael Manasseri	Charles	Hindi	English	1988	2007	
High School Musical	Ryne Sanborn	Jason Cross	Hindi	English	2006	2007	
High School Musical 2	Ryne Sanborn	Jason Cross	Hindi	English	2007	2008	Both the second and third films premiered dubbed into Hindi in the same year of 2008.
High School Musical 3: Senior Year	Ryne Sanborn	Jason Cross	Hindi	English	2008	2008	Both the second and third films premiered dubbed into Hindi in the same year of 2008.
Final Destination 2	James Kirk	Tim Carpenter	Hindi	English	2003	2007	
Halloweentown	Phillip Van Dyke	Luke	Hindi	English	1998	2000	
Motocrossed	Trever O'Brien	Andrew Carson	Hindi	English	2001	2004	
Last Action Hero	Austin O'Brien	Danny Madigan	Hindi	English	1993	2000	
Air Bud	Brendan Fletcher	Larry Willingham	Hindi	English	1997	2007	
Dumb and Dumberer: When Harry Met Lloyd	Shia LaBeouf	Lewis	Hindi	English	2003	2004	
Holes	Byron Cotton	Theodore "Armpit"	Hindi	English	2003		
Martial Arts of Shaolin	Hu Jianqiang	Chao Wei	Hindi	Mandarin Chinese; Cantonese Chinese	1986	2007	
Camp Rock	Kevin Jonas	Jason Gray	Hindi	English	2008	2009	Aired on the summer of 2009.
Camp Rock 2: The Final Jam	Kevin Jonas	Jason Gray	Hindi	English	2010	2010	Aired in September 2010.
10 Things I Hate About You	Joseph Gordon-Levitt	Cameron James	Hindi	English	1999	2009	
The Shaggy Dog	Shawn Pyfrom	Trey	Hindi	English	2006	2009	
Get a Clue	Bug Hall	Jack Downey	Hindi	English	2002	2009	
Stepsister from Planet Weird	Henry Feagins	Fanul	Hindi	English	2000	2009	
So Close	Michael Wai	Siu-Ma	Hindi	Cantonese Chinese; English	2002	2010	
Until Death	Wes Robinson	Chad Mansen	Hindi	English	2007	2010	
Johnny Mnemonic	Arthur Eng	Viet	Hindi	English; Japanese	1995	2010	
District 9	Mandla Gaduka	Fundiswa Mhlanga	Hindi	English; Nyanja; Afrikaans; Zulu; Xhosa; Sotho	1995	2010	
Mars Attacks!	Lukas Haas	Richie Norris	Hindi	English	1996	2010	
Prom Night	Kelly Blatz	Michael	Hindi	English	2008	2010	
Outbreak	Cuba Gooding, Jr.	Major Salt	Hindi	English	1995	2010	
High Risk	Chung-Hsien Yang	Detective Chow Kam	Hindi	English	1995	2011	
Slam	Wang Wei	Li Wei	Hindi	Mandarin Chinese	2008	2011	
Shank	Kedar Williams-Stirling	Junior	Hindi	English	2010	2011	
Hyenas	Andrew James Allen	Jasper	Hindi	English	2011	2011	
Jeepers Creepers 2	Garikayi Mutambirwa	Deaundre "Double D" Davis	Hindi	English	2003	2011	
Fair Game	Scott Michael Campbell	Adam	Hindi	English	1995	2011	
The Haunting Hour: Don't Think About It	Cody Linley	Sean Redford	Hindi	English	2007	2007	
Surrogates	Cody Christian	Boy Canter	Hindi	English	2009	2009	
True Grit	Domhnall Gleeson	Moon (The Kid)	Hindi	English	2010	2011	
The Social Network	Jesse Eisenberg	Mark Zuckerberg	Hindi	English	2010	2010	
Twilight	Cam Gigandet	James Witherdale	Hindi	English	2008	2008	
Jumanji: Welcome to the Jungle	Alex Wolff	Spencer Gilpin	Hindi	English	2017	2017	
Need for Speed	Harrison Gilbertson	Pete Coleman	Hindi	English	2014	2018	Performed alongside Uplaksh Kochhar who voiced Aaron Paul as Tobey Marshall.
Max Steel	Josh Brener	Steel (voice)	Hindi	English	2016	2018	

=== Animated films ===
Film title	Original Voice(s)	Character(s)	Dub language	Original language	Original Year release	Dub Year release	Notes
Recess: School's Out	Andrew Lawrence	Theodore Jasper "T.J." Detweiller	Hindi	English	2001	2001	
Recess: All Growed Down	Ross Malinger, Andrew Lawrence	Theodore Jasper "T.J." Detweiller	Hindi	English	2003	2003	
Robots	Ewan McGregor	Rodney Copperbottom	Hindi	English	2005	2007	
Tinker Bell	Rob Paulsen	Bobble	Hindi	English	2008	2008	
Tinker Bell and the Lost Treasure	Rob Paulsen	Bobble	Hindi	English	2009	2009	
Pixie Hollow Games	Rob Paulsen	Bobble	Hindi	English	2011	2012	
Phineas and Ferb the Movie: Across the 2nd Dimension	Bobby Gaylor, Mitchel Musso	Buford Van Stomm, Jeremy Johnson (Phineas and Ferb)	Hindi; Marathi	English	2011	2011	
Epic	Josh Hutcherson	Nod	Hindi	English	2013	2013	
Kung Fu Panda	Jack Black	Po	Marathi	English	2008	2016	Marathi dub created for Zee Talkies by VR Films.
Kung Fu Panda 2	Jack Black	Po	Marathi	English	2011	2016	Marathi dub created for Zee Talkies by VR Films.

=== Anime films ===
Film title	Original Japanese voice	Character	Dub language	Original Year Release	Dubbed Year Release	Notes
Pokémon: The First Movie	Rica Matsumoto	Ash Ketchum (Satoshi)	Hindi	1998	2015	Aired on Hungama TV with the in-house UTV Software Communications Hindi dub voice cast which was shown over 17 years later, after the original Japanese theatrical release. Unlike the Hindi dub of the animated series that was based on the English dub, this film is actually being done directly based on the original Japanese version, despite still using the English names. The premiere date was 18 April 2015 for the channel and it was aired as: "Pokémon The Movie - Mewtwo Ka Badla" (पोकीमॉन द मूवी - म्यूटो का बदला).
Pokemon: The Movie 2000 - The Power of One	Rica Matsumoto	Ash Ketchum (Satoshi)	Hindi	1999	2015	It got set to air on Hungama TV with the in-house UTV Software Communications Hindi dub voice cast which will be shown over 16 years later, after the original Japanese theatrical release. Unlike the Hindi dub of the animated series that was based on the English dub, this film is actually being done directly based on the original Japanese version, despite still using the English names. The premiere date was for the Summer of 2015 for the channel and it aired as: "Pokémon: Movie EK Ki TAAQAT" (पोकीमॉन मूवी - एक की ताक़त).

== See also ==
- List of Indian Dubbing Artists
