= The Door (2025 film) =

2025 Tamil film by Jaiiddev

- Theatrical release poster
- Directed by: Jaiiddev
- Written by: Jaiiddev
- Produced by: Naveen Rajan
- Starring: Bhavana; Ganesh Venkatraman; Priya Venkat; Jayaprakash; Sriranjini
- Cinematography: Gautham G
- Edited by: Athul Vijay
- Music by: Varun Unni
- Production company: June Dreams Studios
- Distributed by: Sapphire Studios
- Release date: 28 March 2025
- Country: India
- Language: Tamil

The Door is a 2025 Indian Tamil-language horror thriller film starring Bhavana in the lead role, written and directed by her brother Jaiiddev and produced by her husband Naveen Rajan under June Dreams Studios banner. The film also stars Ganesh Venkatraman, Jayaprakash, Nandu, Sriranjini, Kapil Velavan, Gireesh, Priya Venkat, Ramesh Arumugam, Sindhoori, Sangeetha and others in important roles.

The Door released in theatres on 28 March 2025 and became a commercial failure.

== Cast ==
- Bhavana as Mithra
- Ganesh Venkatraman as Raisudeen
- Jayaprakash as MD Velmurugan
- Nandu as Advocate A. S. Rathinam
- Sriranjini as Devika
- Kapil Velavan as Ram / George
- Gireesh as Nagalingam
- Priya Venkat as Shalini
- Ramesh Arumugam as Dr. Viswa
- Sindhoori as Mariya
- Sangeetha as Megha
- TSR Srinivasan as Dr. Selva
- Pondy Ravi as Contractor

== Production ==
On 6 June 2023, coinciding with Bhavana's 37th birthday, an announcement about her 86th film which is to be written and directed by her brother Jaiiddev titled The Door was made. The film marks her return to Tamil cinema who was last seen in Ajith Kumar starrer film Aasal (2010), which released 13 years ago, during announcement. The horror-thriller film is produced by Bhavana's husband Naveen Rajan under June Dreams Studios banner, and the technical team consists of cinematographer Gautham G, editor Athul Vijay and music composer Varun Unni. Apart from Bhavana, the film also features Ganesh Venkatraman, Jayaprakash, Sriranjini, Nandhu, Kapil Velavan, Priya Venkat, Ramesh Arumugam, Sindhoori, Sangeetha and others in supporting roles.

== Release ==
The Door released in theatres on 28 March 2025 in Tamil, along with its dubbed versions in Kannada, Malayalam, Hindi and Telugu languages.

== Reception ==
A critic of Dinamalar rated the film 2.75/5 stars, praising the twists, interesting screenplay while criticizing the horror scenes for not being able to convey any kind of fear to the audience. Abhinav Subramanian of The Times of India gave 2/5 stars and wrote "In Jaiiddev's The Door, the most terrifying presence isn't actually in the movie; it's the creeping realisation you've seen this exact spectral blueprint many times before. The result is a two-hour séance that isn't slow-burn horror but simply... slow." A critic of Maalai Malar rated the film 2/5 stars, praising the performances of the actors and cinematography while criticizing the lack of horror elements, visuals and the excessive noise. A critic of Cinema Vikatan reviewed the film by lauding the few investigative scenes in the second half, while criticizing the screenplay, music, background score, illogical sequences and the preliminary level graphic works.
