= 18 Hours (2021 film) =

2021 Indian Malayalam-language film

- Release poster
- Directed by: Rajesh Nair
- Written by: Vinod Vijayakumar; Vinod Jayakumar
- Produced by: Rajesh Nair; Salil Sankaran
- Starring: Vijay Babu; Shyamaprasad; Sudheer Karamana
- Cinematography: P. M. Rajkumar
- Edited by: Deepu S. Joseph
- Music by: Ratheesh Vegha
- Production companies: Vaya Films; Zaya Platforms
- Distributed by: ManoramaMax
- Release date: 1 August 2021
- Running time: 133 minutes
- Country: India
- Language: Malayalam

18 Hours is a 2021 India Malayalam-language mystery thriller film directed by Rajesh Nair. It was released on 1 August 2021 through Manorama Max.

== Cast ==
- Vijay Babu
- Shyamaprasad
- Sudheer Karamana
- Devi Ajith as Geetha
- Harikrishnan as Vinayan
- Abhirami as Fiza
- Parthavi Vinod as Dwani
- Anagha Maya Ravi as Bhoomi
- Advaith Ajay as Chottu
- Indhu Thampy as Anupama
- Keerthana Sreekumar as Elza
- Sanjana Nair as Alisha

== Reception ==
A critic from Manorama Online wrote that "Overall, Eighteen Hours is a thrilling watch. It may not make you jump off yourr seat but the pace and engaging narrative will keep you hooked till the end". A critic from The Times of India wrote that "From the moment of the hijack, most of the frames bristle with scares and sweat, until the last minutes of the film and it can keep you on the edge of your seat".
