= Cool Ganesha =

Indian Kannada-language romantic drama film

- VCD Cover
- Directed by: Vasanth
- Screenplay by: Vasanth
- Story by: Gundlupete Suresh
- Produced by: P Surendra Gundlupete; B Suresh Hura
- Starring: Jaggesh; Tashu Kaushik
- Cinematography: Ramesh Babu
- Edited by: K M Prakash
- Music by: Manikanth Kadri
- Production company: Megamind Productions
- Release date: 29 November 2013
- Country: India
- Language: Kannada

Cool Ganesha is a 2013 Indian Kannada-language romantic drama film directed by Vasanth and starring Jaggesh in the title role and Tashu Kaushik in her Kannada debut. The film was a box office failure. The film is a remake of the Malayalam film Pandippada (2005).

== Cast ==
- Jaggesh as Cool Ganesha
- Tashu Kaushik as Anjanappa’s daughter
- R. N. Sudarshan
- Shobaraj as Veerabhadra
- Kuri Prathap
- Girija Lokesh
- Jeevan as Agni Surya
- Harry Joseph as Hebbet Anjanappa
- Shille Manjunath

== Soundtrack ==
The music was composed by Manikanth Kadri. The audio was released under the label Jhankar Music.

Track listing
| No. | Title | Singer(s) | Length |
|---|---|---|---|
| 1. | "Jigi Jigidide Hrudayavu" | Karthik, Anupama | 4:28 |
| 2. | "Beautifullu Hennu" | Jaggesh, Indu Nagaraj | 4:35 |
| 3. | "Bisi Jangiralla" | Karthik, Suchitra | 4:27 |
| 4. | "Idhi Manakey Sadhyam" | Jaggesh, Gurukiran, Shamitha Malnad | 4:31 |
| Total length: | | | 18:01 |

== Reception ==
A critic from Rediff.com wrote that "Cool Ganesha is a cool entertainer and a good pastime for people who are looking for a comedy film to watch this weekend". A critic from The Times of India wrote that "the story is old wine in new bottle". A critic from Bangalore Mirror wrote that "Cool Ganesha is not cool at all. Instead, it’s a tepid comedy that can still be enjoyed on telly".
