= Haleem Khan =

Indian Kuchipudi dancer and actor

- Born: Ongole, Andhra Pradesh, India
- Occupations: Kuchipudi dancer; Actor
- Years active: 1990s–present

Haleem Khan is an Indian Kuchipudi dancer and actor. He is known for his expertise in Rupanurupam (female impersonation) within the Kuchipudi tradition and for his portrayals in productions such as Bhama Kalapam and various roles based on Annamacharya kirtanas. Khan has performed in India and abroad and has conducted Kuchipudi workshops internationally.

He later entered Telugu cinema and has appeared in several films since making his acting debut in Nuvvila (2011).

== Early life and training ==
Khan trained in Kuchipudi and specialised in portraying female characters, a traditional practice within the dance form. His performances have received critical acclaim for their expressive quality and authenticity.

== Career ==
Khan gained recognition through performances at cultural festivals and classical dance events across India. He became particularly known for his portrayals of female characters in works such as Bhama Kalapam.

Over the course of his career, he has performed in more than 800 solo and group shows in India and overseas, while also conducting Kuchipudi workshops internationally.

In 2016, Haleem Khan signed the Telugu film Aame Atadaite, in which he portrayed both the male protagonist and a female character. He stated that he had previously declined several stereotypical roles involving gender expression because he felt they lacked sensitivity towards the LGBTQ community.

== Legacy ==
Khan's journey from a conservative background to becoming a recognised Kuchipudi performer has been highlighted by several media outlets. His work is noted for preserving the tradition of female impersonation in Kuchipudi while introducing the art form to wider audiences through performances and workshops.

== Filmography ==
Year	Title	Role	languages	Notes
2011	Nuvvila	Shailesh "Shailu"	Telugu	Telugu Debut
2013	Action 3D		Telugu	
	Aame Atadaite		Telugu	Played both the male lead and female protagonist.
