= Rakshasa (2025 film) =

2025 Indian horror thriller film

- Theatrical release poster
- Directed by: Lohith H.
- Written by: Lohith H.
- Produced by: Deepu B. S.
- Starring: Prajwal Devaraj; Sonal Monteiro
- Cinematography: Jebin P. Jacob
- Edited by: C. Ravichandran
- Music by: Varun Unni
- Production company: Shanvi Entertainments
- Release date: 7 March 2025
- Country: India
- Language: Kannada

Rakshasa is a 2025 Indian Kannada-language horror thriller film written and directed by Lohith H. The film stars Prajwal Devaraj and Sonal Monteiro.

== Plot ==
Satya, a suspended police officer, is tasked with capturing three criminals near Ongole and holding them at an old railway station police outpost. Beneath the station is a wooden trunk containing a Brahmarakshasa, a demon imprisoned centuries earlier by Saint Ramanujacharya. During an eclipse known as the “dark hour”, Satya unknowingly opens the trunk, releasing the demon and triggering a time loop in which the same hour repeats endlessly.

Trapped inside the station, Satya and the criminals endure the demon's attacks while gradually uncovering fragments of its history. With each repetition, the danger intensifies, and Satya is forced to confront his own troubled past. Using the knowledge gained from each loop, he devises a plan to imprison the demon once more. In the climax, Satya succeeds in resealing the Brahmarakshasa, breaking the loop and ending the curse.

Morning arrives, but the film hints that greater secrets remain, leaving the story open for a subsequent chapter.

== Cast ==
- Prajwal Devaraj as Satya
- Sonal Monteiro
- Arna Rathod
- Sridhar
- Vihaan Krishna
- Somashekar
- Gautam

== Production ==
Prior to the production of this film, Lohith and Prajwal Devaraj had already worked on the film Mafia. Initially, the film was titled A Tale of Devil, but the makers changed it to Rakshasa due to Darshan's film being titled The Devil. The filming took place in Ramoji Film City for over fifty-five days. A few portions of the film were shot in Bangalore, Rameswaram, and Goa.

== Soundtrack ==
The film has songs composed by Varun Unni.

Track listing
No.	Title	Lyrics	Singer(s)	Length
1.	"Oh Nanna Jeevave"	Dhananjay Ranjan	Kapil Kapilan	3:25
2.	"Ra Ra Rakshasa"	Dhananjay Ranjan	Varun Unni	3:25
Total length:				6:50

== Release ==
Rakshasa was initially scheduled to be released on 26 February 2025, but it was postponed and was released theatrically on 7 March 2025.

== Reception ==
Sridevi S. of The Times of India rated the film three out of five stars and wrote, "Despite minor flaws, the movie captures the audience's attention. The film takes off like a commercial caper, but gains momentum once the demon is unleashed." Shashiprasad SM of Times Now gave it three out of five stars and wrote, "On the downside, Rakshasa may not appeal to casual viewers looking for straightforward thrills and chills, as it leaves many questions unanswered. However, beyond the time-loop concept, the film does have genuinely scary sequences."

Suhasini B. Srihari of Deccan Herald gave it two out of five stars and wrote, "The story seems to confuse the genres of mythology and horror. The generic horror elements, such as the presence of a creepy doll and doors shutting by themselves, are a desperate attempt to make the film sell under the horror banner." A. Sharadhaa of The New Indian Express wrote, "Though Rakshasa: Part 2 may feel incomplete, it sets the stage for what’s to come."
