= Salt Mango Tree =

- Theatrical release poster
- Directed by: Rajesh Mohanan
- Screenplay by: Vinod & Vinod
- Story by: Suchitra Bhattacharya
- Produced by: Abeesh V. P.; Roshan Chittoor; Shajoon Kariyal
- Starring: Biju Menon; Lakshmi Priyaa Chandramouli; Suhasini Maniratnam; Paris Laxmi; Indrans; Sarayu; Sudheer Karamana; Hareesh Perumanna
- Cinematography: Vishnu Sarma
- Edited by: E. S. Sooraj
- Music by: Songs: Hesham Abdul Wahab; Score: Bijibal
- Production company: 1000 Lights Entertainments
- Distributed by: Kalasangham Films; Kas & Right Release
- Release date: 6 November 2015
- Running time: 125 minutes
- Country: India
- Language: Malayalam

Salt Mango Tree is a 2015 Indian Malayalam-language comedy-drama film directed by Rajesh Mohanan, starring Biju Menon, Lakshmi Priyaa Chandramouli and Suhasini Maniratnam. The film is a remake of the 2014 Bengali film Ramdhanu, and the title is taken from the Mohanlal starrer Doore Doore Oru Koodu Koottam (1986).

The film was released on 6 November 2015 and received positive reviews from critics.

== Plot ==
Aravindan (Biju Menon) and Priya (Lakshmi Priyaa) are the parents who are battling the educational system to get a spot for their son Manu (Kristin Varkachaan). Aravindan owns a medical shop, while Priya works as a senior accountant at a private firm and they live in a flat. Priya wants Manu to join an English-speaking school. They hire an English tutor to help Manu prepare for his school interview. After so many attempts to get an admission, they finally get an appointment for an interview at Holy Saints English medium school with the help of Kumaran (Sunil Sukadha), who runs a tailoring unit and arranges the admissions after collecting money from parents. However, the interviewers at school interrogate Aravindan and tease him due to his lack of English proficiency. Manu is denied from getting an admission. The family departs the school with broken hearts.

They learn about a career guidance center that will coach the children along with their parents. Deepika (Suhasini), who is the head of the English orientation program, comes as a helping hand for the family, and Manu finally succeeds in learning English. Manu gets an interview at St. Antony's School afterwards, but Manu fails to speak English at the interview. They leave the school out of concern that Manu will not enroll at school. They soon reach Deepika and ask her why their son was unable to pass the interview like the other children. Deepika guides them that parents should let their children be who they want them to be and not place too much emphasis on their children's careers. She imparts lessons on family and educational values.

Back at home Aravindan and Priya discover Manu missing from their flat. They look for him everywhere, only to find him on terrace. Aravindan informs Priya that Manu has been admitted to St. Antony's School.

== Cast ==
- Biju Menon as Aravind T.P
- Lakshmi Priyaa Chandramouli as Priya Aravind
- Kristin Varkachaan as Manu
- Hareesh Perumanna as Shafeeque
- Suhasini Maniratnam as Deepika
- Saiju Kurup as Praveen
- Raghavan as Swami
- Paris Laxmi as Angela Praveen
- Indrans as Pavithran
- Babu Swamy as Menon
- Jayaprakash Kuloor as Appooppan
- Sarayu as Meenakshi Mohan Kumar
- Manju Satheesh as Treesa Chacko
- Sudheer Karamana as Mohan Kumar
- Elizabath as Ammoomma
- Sunil Sukhada as Kumar
- Vijay Menon as Vice Principal
- Pradeep Kottayam as Sameer
- Kottayam Purushan as Biju
- Saiju Panikkar as Chacko
- Lakshmi Menon as Teena
- Bindhu Ramakrishnan
- Giri Shankar as Alwin
- Binoy as Satheesan
- Sreedharan Bhattdhari as Peter
- Baiju Ezhupunna as Charlie
- Manjith
- Praveen Shankaranaryanan as Medical Rep
- Ramji
- Umeshan
- Manjushaa as Manjusha
- Noora as Sreevidhya
- Jeni as Swapana
- Milu as Meghana
- Parvathy Menon as Teacher
- Jennifer as Interviewer
- Ambika Mohan as Principal
- Doly as Riya
- Lisy as Raji
- Pushpa as Varsha Abhay
- Darshan D Nair as Abhi, Meenakshi's and Mohan Kumar's Son

== Soundtrack ==
Music was composed by Hesham Abdul Wahab, which marked his debut as a music director in Malayalam Cinema. The background score is by Bijibal.

#	Song	Singer	Lyrics
1	"Kaathilaaro"	Sithara Krishnakumar	Rafeeq Ahamed
2	"Kaattummel Anchaaru"	Hesham Abdul Wahab	Aslam
3	"Kanavil Kanavil"	Hesham Abdul Wahab	Madhu Vasudevan

== Reception ==
Critical reception was mostly positive.

The Times of India gave the movie 2.5 stars, claiming its script and writing lacks a usual happy ending or something that can deftly hold it all together. However, the review stay back with film's good humour quotient. Indiaglitz rated the film 3 out of 5 and wrote, "'Salt Mango Tree' is a watchable entertainment. The movie is made delectable with the kind of humour that only Biju Menon is capable. This is a small movie, yet a delightful one." Saumesh Thimbath of The Hindu wrote, " Biju Menon continues the streak of good performances and Lakshmi Rajamouli looks convincing in her role. Kanaran Harish as Aravind's assistant has some of the best comic lines in the movie and delivers an excellent performance.".
