= Khali Purse of Billionaires =

2023 Indian film

- Theatrical release poster
- Directed by: Maxwell Jose
- Written by: Maxwell Jose
- Produced by: Anu Juby James; Ahmed Rubin Salim; Nahas M. Hassan
- Starring: Dhyan Sreenivasan; Arjun Ashokan; Aju Varghese; Tanvi Ram
- Cinematography: Santhosh Anima
- Edited by: Nowfal Abdulla
- Music by: Prakash Alex
- Production company: Royal Buncha Entertainment
- Distributed by: 72 Film Release
- Release date: 10 March 2023
- Running time: 123 minutes
- Country: India
- Language: Malayalam

Khali Purse of Billionaires (transl. Empty purse of billionaires) is a 2023 Indian Malayalam-language comedy film written and directed by Maxwell Jose. It stars Dhyan Sreenivasan, Arjun Ashokan, Aju Varghese, and Tanvi Ram. The film was jointly produced by Ahamed Rubin Salim, Nahas M. Hassan, and Anu Juby James under the banner of Royal Buncha Entertainment.

== Cast ==
- Dhyan Sreenivasan as Vijay
- Arjun Ashokan as Abhi
- Aju Varghese as Das
- Tanvi Ram as Nidhi
- Sarayu Mohan as Grace
- Lena as Shakti
- Sohan Seenulal as Benny
- Edavela Babu as Krish
- Ahmed Sidhique as Thomas
- Major Ravi as Vidhyadharan
- Ramesh Pisharody as Jyostyan
- Dharmajan Bolgatty as Pauli
- Raffi as Vijay's father
- Sminu Sijo as Vijay's mother
- Jagadish as Nidhi's father
- Neena Kurup as Nidhi's mother
- Tinu Thomas as Banker

== Production ==
=== Filming ===
The film's shooting began on 25 November 2020 and wrapped up on 26 December 2020.

== Release ==
=== Theatrical ===
The film was theatrically released on 10 March 2023 by 72 Film Company.
