= Escape from Uganda =

2013 Malayalam film

- Theatrical release poster
- Directed by: Rajesh Mohanan
- Screenplay by: Sandeep Robinson; Deepak; Dialogue: Salin Mankuzhy Prabhakaran; Nithin Bhadran
- Story by: Rajesh Nair
- Produced by: Girisch Nair; Usha Rajesh; Kishor Nair
- Starring: Rima Kallingal; Vijay Babu; R. Parthiepan
- Cinematography: Vishnu Sarma
- Edited by: Gopi Sunder
- Music by: Varun Unni; Gopi Sunder
- Production companies: Vaya Films; River Nile Motion Pictures
- Distributed by: Kalasangham Films; KAS & Right
- Release date: 29 November 2013
- Country: India
- Language: Malayalam

Escape from Uganda is a 2013 Malayalam thriller film directed by Rajesh Mohanan. The cast includes Rima Kallingal, Vijay Babu, R. Parthiepan, Joju George, Tashu Kaushik, Winston Witecker and also Mukesh in a cameo appearance. The story is by Rajesh Nair, screenplay & dialogues by Sandeep Robinson, Deepak Prabhakaran and Nithin Bhadran . Several plots as well as the general thread of the movie have an uncanny similarity to the Hollywood thriller The Next Three Days. Escape From Uganda started rolling in Uganda from 7 July. It was shot completely in Uganda and was the first Malayalam film to be shot extensively in Africa.

== Plot ==
Shikha Samuel, along with her husband Jayakrishnan, has chosen of all places in the world, Uganda, to find refuge in, after her family in Kerala objects to their marriage. The couple is leading a happy life with their daughter, Meenakshi. Jayakrishnan is employed as a manager in a coffee shop and Shikha runs a designer boutique of her own. She soon sets up a boutique of her own in the African country. The tranquillity of their life is shattered when Shikha is arrested on the charges of committing two murders, one of the victim is the daughter of the local Mayor, who has pledged to keep her in jail for the rest of her life. Jayakrishnan meets Antony through his working area owner Gautham. Antony gives tips and materials for Shikha to get out of jail. After come out of jail, Jayakrishnan and Shikha finds out that Antony is actually Carlose Kennedy a local Don who was behind the murders, now he wants to trap them. Jayakrishnan who already informed local police of Carlos's evil plans now gets help from local police. Carlos gets arrested. Finally Jayakrishnan and Shikha escape from Uganda by helicopter before the goons could trap and attack.

== Cast ==
- Rima Kallingal as Shikha Samuel
- Vijay Babu as Jayakrishnan
- R. Parthiepan as Anthony / Carlos Kennedy- The Main Antagonist
- Joju George as Gautham
- Tashu Kaushik as Angel Mathews
- Mukesh as adv Firoz (extended cameo)
- Winston Witecker
- Jose Chameleone as Don Dada
- Michael Wawuyo
- Sam Bagenda as the Mayor
- Wilberforce Mutete
- Asaba Jumah as Moses
- Anita Kyalimpa as Oldra
- Carlos George Ombonya

== Production ==
Rima Kallingal was signed to play the lead role of a mother of a three-year-old in the film. She was said to be seen in a never before seen avatar, doing some daredevil stunts for the first time in her career. Rima, who is trained in the Kerala martial art form Kalaripayattu and the Manipuri martial art Chau, will be using them in action sequences.

The film's cast also included a few actors from Uganda thanks to Xtrim Casting and Casting Director, Wilber Rugarama. Anita Kyalimpa, first runner up of Miss Uganda 2013, made her acting debut in the film as the murdered daughter of a city mayor, who was played by Ebonies’ Sam Bagenda (aka Dr. Bbosa) while veteran Ugawood actor, Micheal Wawuyo, played the head of military intelligence. Actor and police officer, Wilberforce Mutete, played his day job role in the film too. Brenda Nanyonjo, Miss Uganda organiser and Tricksters star, Carlos Ombonya, were also part of the cast.

The climax of the film was said to be shot in the Luzira Maximum Security Prison, a notorious prison in Uganda. The team claimed that besides shooting at the source of the Nile, they will also can some shots near hot water springs and live volcanoes.

== Soundtrack ==
Escape from Uganda

Soundtrack album by Varun Unni, Gopi Sunder
- Released: 3 November 2013
- Recorded: 2013
- Language: Malayalam
- Label: Satyam Audio

No.	Title	Singer(s)	Length
1.	"Ea Sundari"	Gopi Sunder, Anna Katharina Valayil	3:41
2.	"Ee Eravile"	Rahul Nambiar	4:52
3.	"Thenalle"	Sachin Warrier	3:45
4.	"Yaanam"	Suchith Suresan	2:49
