= Havish =

Indian actor

- Born: Koneru Lakshman Havish; 25 June 1992 (age 34); Vijayawada, Andhra Pradesh, India
- Education: Purdue University in Indianapolis, United States (Industrial Engineering)
- Occupations: Actor; film producer; educationist; entrepreneur
- Years active: 2011–present
- Father: Koneru Satyanarayana

Koneru Lakshman Havish is an Indian actor, producer and educator, primarily associated with Telugu cinema. He made his film debut in 2011 with the movie Nuvvila.

Apart from his film career, Havish holds a leadership position in the Koneru Lakshmaiah Education Foundation, where he serves as Vice-President He is also associated with the film production company A Havish Productions.

== Early and personal life ==
Havish was born in 1992 in Vijayawada, Andhra Pradesh, India. His father, Koneru Satyanarayana, is a film producer and holds the position of President at the K L Deemed to be University. His mother, Koneru Kanchana Latha, serves as Secretary of the foundation. The family is associated with educational and business activities in Andhra Pradesh.

Havish completed his undergraduate studies in Industrial Engineering at Purdue University in Indianapolis, United States. Following his return to India, he pursued an interest in acting and later relocated to Hyderabad to explore opportunities in the Telugu film industry.

== Career ==
Havish made his acting debut with the Telugu romantic comedy Nuvvila (2011), directed by Ravi Babu. He next appeared in Genius (2012), a drama directed by Ohmkar.The film was noted for its themes addressing youth and society.

In 2015, Havish played the lead role in Ram Leela (2015), a romantic drama. He later featured in the bilingual mystery thriller, Seven (2019), directed by Nizar Shafi.

In addition to his acting career, Havish is involved in film production through his company, A Havish Productions. He has produced several films in collaboration with other production houses, including Khiladi (2022, Telugu), Oh Manapenne! (2021, Tamil), and Rakshasudu (2019, Telugu).

He also established Havish Studio, a film production facility located in Bachupally, Hyderabad.

== Filmography ==
Actor

Key
†	Denotes films that have not yet been released

Year	Film	Role(s)	Language	Notes
2011	Nuvvila	Mahesh	Telugu	
2012	Genius	Nivas	Telugu	
2015	Ram Leela	Ram	Telugu	
2019	Seven	Karthik/Krishnamoorthy	Telugu; Tamil	
2025	Yess Boss † †	TBA	Telugu	Post-production
2025	Nenu Ready † †	TBA	Telugu	Pre-production

As a producer

Year	Film	Notes
2019	Rakshasudu	Telugu
2021	Khiladi	Telugu
2021	Oh Manapenne!	Tamil

== Other work ==
Havish serves as the Vice-President of KL (Deemed to be) University, located in Vaddeswaram, near Vijayawada, Andhra Pradesh, as well as its Hyderabad campus, KLH University. In this role, he is involved in academic administration and institutional planning.
