= Kalyanam (film) =

- Directed by: Rajesh Nair
- Written by: Govind Vijayan, Summesh Maddhu, Rajesh R. Nair
- Story by: Rajesh Nair
- Produced by: Ratheesh Nair, Radha Mohan, T.K. Udhaya Bhanu, Kishor Nair
- Starring: Varsha Bollamma; Shravan Mukesh
- Cinematography: Binendra Menon
- Edited by: Sooraj E.S.
- Music by: Prakash Alex
- Production companies: Vaya Film & Sri Sathya Sai Arts
- Release date: 23 February 2018
- Country: India
- Language: Malayalam

Kalyanam is a 2018 Malayalam romantic-comedy film written and directed by Rajesh Nair. The cinema stars Varsha Bollamma, marking her entry into Malayalam cinema industry. A newcomer Shravan Mukesh, the son of the Malayalam film actor Mukesh, acts in a lead role. The film was released on 23 February 2018.

== Plot ==
Sarath, the only son of Prabhakaran is madly in love with his childhood friend Shari, the only daughter of their neighbour Sahadevan Nair. As they grow up it becomes difficult for Sarath to somehow convey his feelings to her, despite both of them meeting frequently. Moreover, Shari's dad wants to marry her off to a Nair boy. Sarath is always accompanied by his friend Saiju and his too young uncle Avesh. They spend most of the day at a garage owned by Sundaran. Sarath observes that Varkey, an aged worker in the garage is often visited by a drunkard man who keeps coming to the garage for the sake of scolding Varkey, who always gives a deaf ear to it. No one knows the reason or relation between them.

Later, Shari's parents arrange a bridegroom for her which saddens Sarath which leads to comical situations. It ends up with the three of them being caught by the police, though released later. Varkey is again scolded by the drunken man, and Sarath asks him why he is scolded. Varkey reveals that the drunken man was the one who liked Varkey's daughter a lot, and wanted to marry her. But Varkey objected, due to the guy being from a different religion. He also marries the girl off to a suitable family. But the girl got killed few days later, thus saddening both Varkey and the man.

Hearing the story and also witnessing Shari accompanying her would-be home, Sarath is disheartened and attempts suicide by standing on a railway track. But he is stopped by his parents, and he discloses about his love to them for the first time. Prabhakaran says that they would have arranged for it had he told about it earlier. Now that it is too late, Sarath is advised by his father to forget everything. While at Shari's home on the day before the marriage, he unintentionally goes to Shari's room, where he sees objects from their childhood which she preserved. Upon meeting her, she confesses to him that she liked him a lot since childhood, but didn't talk about it as he apparently showed no interest. Now that both of them had confessed their liking for each other, Shari says its too late for both of them. She says it was Sarath's father who disapproved their marriage. Sarath meets Sahadevan, who makes it clear that he wasn't interested in their relationship right from their childhood, so he was the one who lied to her.

Knowing all these, Prabhakaran decides to confront Sahadevan who rejected his son. After Prabhakaran enters Sahadevan's room, Sarath's friends eagerly wait outside and see Prabhakaran coming out after sometime. He asks Sarath to be ready for his marriage the next day. The next day, to everyone's surprise, Sarath marries Shari in the same planned time. Sarath and his friends are eager to know how Prabhakaran made things possible. He reveals that it was Shari's master plan, by faking a suicide attempt if Sahadevan doesn't allow her marriage with Sarath. Thus Sarath realises how much Shari loves him, and confesses that his feelings were nothing before that of her.

== Cast ==
- Varsha Bollamma as Shari
- Shravan Mukesh as Sarath
- Parvathi T as Suma
- Mukesh as K.P. Sahadevan Nair
- Sreenivasan as Prabhakaran
- Jacob Gregory as Saiju
- Hareesh Kanaran as Aveesh Kumar
- Pradeep Kottayam as Aravindan
- Sudheer Karamana as police officer
- Asha Aravind as Rukmini
- Dharmajyothis Manoj as young Sarath
- Dharmathejas Manoj as teenager sarath
- Parvadhy as young Shari
- Sanjana as teenager Shari
- Saiju Kurup as Kishor
- Indrans as Varkey
- S.P. Sreekumar as Jimmy
- Narayanankutty as Ramanan
- Chembil Ashokan as Moideen
- Anu as Ummakolus
- Manju Sunichen as Rama
- Saju Navodaya as Velladi
- Dharmajan Bolgatty as Sundaran
- Anil Nedumangad as Cameo appearance
- Sasi Kalinga as Cameo appearance
- Sandhya S as a person in crowd (Special Cameo)

== Music ==
The film's soundtrack and score is composed by Prakash Alex and sung by Najim Arshad and Siddharth Menon, Also the viral song Drithangapulakitha song rendered by Dulquer Salmaan and Jacob Gregory. The team have organized an under water audio launch for the movie at Kovalam beach in Thiruvananthapuram on February 6.

== Release ==
The Times of India gave the film a rating of two-and-a-half out of five stars and wrote that "The fact that the director has chosen to infuse the film with clichés can still be pushed to the backseat, had there been an element of novelty that would trigger some curiosity among the audience". Manorama Online gave the film the same review and praised the performances of the lead cast.
