= Dushasana (film) =

Indian political drama film

- Official poster
- Directed by: Posani Krishna Murali
- Written by: Posani Krishna Murali
- Produced by: Murali Krishna
- Starring: Srikanth; Sanjjana; Tashu Kaushik
- Cinematography: A. Raja
- Music by: M. M. Srilekha
- Production company: Laughing Lords Entertainment
- Release date: 27 May 2011
- Country: India
- Language: Telugu

Dushasana is a 2011 Indian Telugu-language political thriller film directed by Posani Krishna Murali and starring Srikanth, Sanjjana, and Tashu Kaushik.

== Cast ==
- Srikanth as Mahesh, a common man similar to Che Guevara
- Sanjjana as Kajal
- Tashu Kaushik as a news channel reporter
- M. Balayya as the chief minister
- Kota Srinivasa Rao as a minister
- Chalapathi Rao as a minister
- Tanikella Bharani as a minister
- Brahmanandam
- Krishna Bhagavaan
- Kondavalasa Lakshmana Rao
- Tarjan
- Sivaji Raja
- Annapoorna

== Soundtrack ==
The music was composed by M. M. Srilekha.

Track listing
No.	Title	Length
1.	"Bellanni Chudagane"	4:11
2.	"Zindabad Zindabad"	3:06
Total length:		7:17

== Reception ==
A critic from Deccan Herald opined that "Dushasana is best left to die an early death at the box office". Radhika Rajamani of Rediff.com rated the film 2/5 stars and wrote, "Watch this political thriller if you've got nothing else to do".
