= Nuvvila =

2011 Indian film by Ravi Babu

- Poster
- Directed by: Ravi Babu
- Screenplay by: Satyanand
- Story by: Ravi Babu
- Produced by: Ramoji Rao
- Starring: Ajay; Havish; Yami Gautam; Vijay Deverakonda; Prasad Barve; Sarayu; Remya Nambeesan
- Cinematography: N. Sudhakar Reddy
- Edited by: Marthand K Venkatesh
- Music by: Shekar Chandra
- Production company: Ushakiran Movies
- Release date: 3 November 2011
- Country: India
- Language: Telugu

Nuvvila is a 2011 Indian Telugu romantic comedy film written and directed by Ravi Babu. He introduced six new faces with this film in lead roles. Ajay, Havish, Yami Gautam, Vijay Deverakonda, Prasad Barve, Sarayu, and Remya Nambeesan. The film features music by Shekar Chandra and is produced by Ramoji Rao.

== Plot ==
A disillusioned student Anand (Ajay), a wannabe model Mahesh (Havish) and a prospective violinist Raju (Prasad Barve) have one thing in common. All three of them work at Pizza Express as a stop-gap arrangement in the pursuit of their dreams. When one pizza delivery changes hands between them, three love stories are born. Anand makes a pizza delivery to Archana (Yami Gautam), who turns out to be his neighbour and falls in love with her. Mahesh goes to break up with his girlfriend Madhavi (Sarayu) and becomes the object of love of "Shailu gay" (Haleem Khan). Raju goes for a violin audition and bumps into the hate of his life Rani (Remya Nambeesan) and life gets out of hand for him.

Love for Archana lands Anand in trouble when he learns that she was in love with a famous cricketer Vishnu (Vijay Deverakonda). Trouble compounds for him when Vishnu dies and Archana was pregnant with his child. Anand shelters Archana at the cost of being thrown out of his own home. Shailu torments Mahesh and it comes to a point that based on circumstantial evidence Mahesh's parents are convinced that their son is gay. Frustration peaks in Mahesh's life when Shailu wants to marry Mahesh and his parents give their consent. The story is further complicated by the appearance of the Shailu's former lover (Chakravarthy) who wanted to sacrifice his love and get Mahesh married to his former lover. An even stranger set of circumstances keeps leading Raju and Rani into each other. To avoid arrest and subsequent jail they are forced to marry each other only to be divorced soon. But in their brief time together they fall in love and get divorced much against their true feeling for each other.

In the end Anand and Archana are accepted as a couple by Anand's parents, Mahesh and Madhavi get back together and Raju and Rani form a formidable team and get their own TV show.

== Cast ==
- Havish as Mahesh
- Ajay as Anand
- Yami Gautam as Archana
- Vijay Deverakonda as Vishnuvardhan "Vishnu" (credited as Vijay Sai)
- Sarayu as Madhavi
- Remya Nambeesan as Rani
- Prasad Barve as Fidel Raju
- Ravi Babu as SI Ranjith Kumar
- Haleem Khan as Shailesh "Shailu"
- Master Atulith as Chitti
- Radha Kumari as Anand's grandmother
- Deva as Shailu's lover
- Sudhakara Raju
- Priyadarshini
- Lakshmi Bhargavi
- Kishore
- R. K. as Thief

=== Special appearances ===
- M. M. Keeravani
- Koti
- Chakri
- RP Patnaik
- Kalyani Malik

== Music ==
The music was composed by Shekar Chandra.

Nuvvila

Film score by Shekar Chandra
- Released: 2011
- Genre: Feature film soundtrack
- Language: Telugu
- Producer: Shekar Chandra

Shekar Chandra chronology
Manasara (2010)	Nuvvila (2011)	Ooh La La La (2012)

No	Song	Singers
1	"Are Chethini Vadalani"	Krishna Chaitanya
2	"Are You An Angel"	Shekar Chandra
3	"Enakine Aypothunnane"	Deepu
4	"Baby Aa Popula Dabba"	Revanth, Geetha Madhuri
5	"Enno Kalale"	Shekar Chandra
6	"I Love You So Much"	Shekar Chandra
7	"Sugar And Spice"	Deepu
8	"Why Do People Fall In Love"	Shekar Chandra, Harshika
9	"Kottuku Chaddham"	Deepu, Geetha Madhuri

== Reception ==
A critic from Rediff.com wrote that "The film is entertaining but the script has loopholes".
