= Prasad Barve =

Indian actor

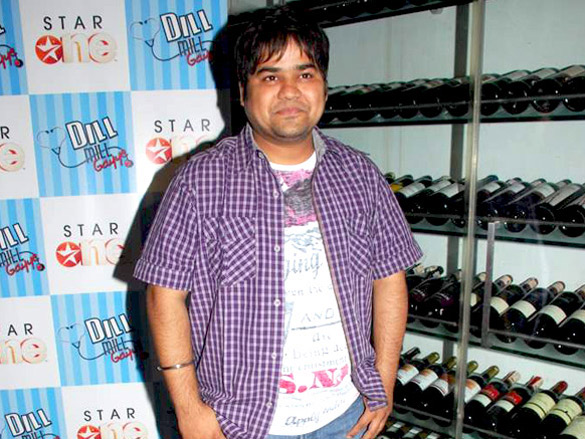
- Barve at Star One's Dill Mill Gayye party
- Born: Pune, India
- Occupation: Actor
- Years active: 1994–present
- Spouse: Preeteek Khanvilkar (m. 2012)

Prasad Barve is an Indian actor who specializes in dubbing. He is also a TV actor and occasional film actor. He speaks Marathi, Hindi and English.

== Career ==
His first notable role was as Nihaal in Shree. Then he entered as a new intern in Dill Mill Gayye season 2. Both his roles are comical. He has acted in the movie Vishwavinayak as a child artist. He has also acted in many popular advertisements including Tata Sky.

== Filmography ==
=== Films ===
Year	Film	Role	Language	Notes
2010	Hide & Seek	Young Imran Baig	Hindi	
2011	Nuvvila	Fidel Raju	Telugu	
2012	Bol Bachchan	Ravi's friend	Hindi	
2014	Bobby Jasoos	Shetty	Hindi	
2017	Ti Saddhya Kay Karte	Pavya	Marathi	
2017	Tamburo	Chirag	Gujarati	
2017	Hanuman: Da' Damdaar	Pig 1, Pig 3, Chotu (voice)	Hindi	Animated film; Triple role
2008	Ghatothkach	Gajju, the elephant (voice)	Hindi	Animated film; voiced the elder version. The younger version was voiced by Meghana Erande.

=== Television ===
Year(s)	Show	Role	Notes
2009–2010	Dill Mill Gayye	Dr. Jitendra Prasad	
2013	Mrs. Pammi Pyarelal	Randhir Faujdar	
2015	Baalveer	Magical Zimbola/Khunkhar	
2015–2017	Yeh Vaada Raha	Jatin Mehta	
2017	Khatmal E Ishq... Biwi Ke Naakhre..Offo!!	Ramesh Gupta	
2017	Chidiya Ghar	Chamkadar	
2018	Sajan Re Phir Jhooth Mat Bolo	Inspector Karan	
2018	Shrimaan Shrimati Phir Se	Keshav Kulkarni	

== Dubbing career ==
Prasad is usually best known for voicing comic relief characters when it comes to dubbing foreign media and he very rarely does voiceover for serious characters. He has been voicing various different characters since he was 8. As he got a bit older, he first started with dubbing for Paul C. Scott as Reggie Williams in Small Wonder. He is also known for doing the Hindi voiceover for Orlando Brown as Eddie in That's So Raven on Disney Channel. Prasad has dubbed for the iconic character Vegeta in Dragon Ball Z and Ash Ketchum in Pokémon (Cartoon Network Dub). He has also done Hindi voiceover roles for famous cartoons like in Scooby-Doo, Stitch in Lilo & Stitch: The Series and Japanese anime like Perman 1 (Mitsuo Suwa) in Perman.

He has also lend his Hindi dubbing voice to Ivan in 2003 film, Barbie of Swan Lake and to Po in the Kung Fu Panda franchise.

== Dubbing roles ==
=== Animated series ===
Program title	Original voice(s)	Character(s)	Dubbed language	Original language	No. of episodes	Original airdate	Dubbed airdate	Notes
What's New, Scooby-Doo?	Frank Welker	Scooby-Doo	Hindi	English	42	14 September 2002 – 21 July 2006		
Johnny Test	Lee Tockar	Eugene "Bling-Bling Boy" Hamilton (Bappi Bapu)	Hindi	English	130	17 September 2005 – 25 December 2014		An unknown actor has dubbed this character in some episodes.
Mickey Mouse	Chris Diamantopoulos	Mickey Mouse	Hindi	English	52	28 June 2013–present		
Recess	Rickey D'Shon Collins	Vincent Pierre "Vince" LaSalle	Hindi	English	127+4 movies	31 August 1997 – 5 November 2001		
The Powerpuff Girls	Tom Kenny	Mitch Mitchelson	Hindi	English	78	18 November 1998 – 25 March 2005	1999-2005	Aired on Zee TV in 1999 and on Cartoon Network India from 2000-2005.
The Powerpuff Girls	Dee Bradley Baker	Elmer Sglue	Hindi	English	78	18 November 1998 – 25 March 2005	1999-2005	Aired on Zee TV in 1999 and on Cartoon Network India from 2000-2005.
Lilo & Stitch: The Series	Chris Sanders	Stitch	Hindi	English	65	20 September 2003 – 29 July 2006		
Kung Fu Panda: Legends of Awesomeness	Mick Wingert	Po	Hindi	English	80	19 September 2011 – 29 June 2016		
Kung Fu Panda: The Paws of Destiny	Mick Wingert	Po	Hindi	English	13	16 November 2018		Available on Amazon Prime in Hindi.
Gravity Falls	Thurop Van Orman	Gideon Gleeful	Hindi	English	40	15 June 2012 – 15 February 2016		
Randy Cunningham: 9th Grade Ninja	Andrew Caldwell	Howard Weinerman	Hindi	English	100	13 August 2012 – 27 July 2015		
Richie Rich	Dick Beals	Reggie Van Dough	Hindi	English	41	8 November 1980 – 1 September 1984		
X-Men: Evolution	Brad Swaile	Kurt Wagner / Nightcrawler	Hindi	English	52	4 November 2000 – 25 October 2003		
Dragon Ball Z	Ryō Horikawa (JP); Christopher Sabat (EN)	Vegeta Gogeta (Vegeta's voice) Vegito (Vegeta's voice)	Hindi	Japanese	291 (Dubbed from episode 54-291)	26 April 1989 – 31 January 1996	2001-2008	The Hindi dub of the series was based on the edited Funimation Entertainment-Saban Entertainment-Ocean Productions English dub, being a revised translation. Viraj Adhav voiced Vegeta from episode 1-53 before Prasad took it over permanently. Ankur Javeri was the voice of the Goku in Gogeta and Vegito. An unknown voice over artist voiced Oolong from episode 1-53 before Prasad took it over permanently. Pawan Kalra voiced Yajirobe from episode 1-53 before Prasad took it over permanently.
Dragon Ball Z	Naoki Tatsuta (JP); Brad Jackson (EN)	Oolong	Hindi	Japanese	291 (Dubbed from episode 54-291)	26 April 1989 – 31 January 1996	2001-2008	The Hindi dub of the series was based on the edited Funimation Entertainment-Saban Entertainment-Ocean Productions English dub, being a revised translation. Viraj Adhav voiced Vegeta from episode 1-53 before Prasad took it over permanently. Ankur Javeri was the voice of the Goku in Gogeta and Vegito. An unknown voice over artist voiced Oolong from episode 1-53 before Prasad took it over permanently. Pawan Kalra voiced Yajirobe from episode 1-53 before Prasad took it over permanently.
Dragon Ball Z	Mayumi Tanaka (JP); Mike McFarland (EN)	Yajirobe	Hindi	Japanese	291 (Dubbed from episode 54-291)	26 April 1989 – 31 January 1996	2001-2008	The Hindi dub of the series was based on the edited Funimation Entertainment-Saban Entertainment-Ocean Productions English dub, being a revised translation. Viraj Adhav voiced Vegeta from episode 1-53 before Prasad took it over permanently. Ankur Javeri was the voice of the Goku in Gogeta and Vegito. An unknown voice over artist voiced Oolong from episode 1-53 before Prasad took it over permanently. Pawan Kalra voiced Yajirobe from episode 1-53 before Prasad took it over permanently.
Pokémon	Rica Matsumoto	Ash Ketchum (Satoshi) (First Dub)	Hindi	Japanese	1000+	1 April 1997 - Current	First Dub 12 May 2003 - 2015 (India); 2004 - 2013, 14 Nov 2018 (S10) (DP) (Pakistan) second dub 19 May 2014 - Current	The First 8 seasons dubbed, were based on the 4Kids Entertainment English dub. The later seasons were also dubbed in Hindi and are also revised translations based on the English dub. A Second Hindi dub has been produced featuring a new Hindi voice cast and translation by UTV Software Communications and aired on Hungama TV. The first dub that Barve was involved in, was produced by Crest Animation Studios for the first four seasons and then by Sound and Vision India for Cartoon Network India, Cartoon Network Pakistan and Pogo starting with the Master Quest season up until after Black and White. Nachiket Dighe voiced this character in the second Hindi dub.Then He also reprised his role back as Ash in S10.
Perman	Katsue Miwa	Mitsuo Suwa / Perman 1	Hindi	Japanese	526+3 specials	4 April 1983 – 2 July 1985		Aired on Nickelodeon India.
Ninja Hattori	Kaneta Kimotsuki	Kemuzo Kemumaki (Amara)	Hindi	Japanese		28 September 1981 – 25 December 1987		Aired on Nickelodeon India.
Dinosaur King	Junichi Endo (JP); David Wills (EN)	Ed	Hindi	Japanese	79	4 February 2007 – 31 August 2008		The Hindi dub of the series was based on the 4Kids Entertainment English dub, being a revised translation.
Digimon Fusion	Chika Sakamoto	Shoutmon	Hindi	Japanese	79	6 July 2010 – 21 March 2012		Dubbed by UTV Software Communications and aired on Hungama TV.
Tsurupika Hagemaru	Unknown voice actor	Kondo	Hindi	Japanese	59+3 specials	3 March 1988 – 6 October 1989		Released as Hagemaru in India and aired on Pogo India and was redubbed by UTV SOFTWARE COMMUNICATION and Aired on Hungama India.
Fast & Furious Spy Racers	Jorge Diaz	Cisco Renaldo	Hindi	English	8	26 December 2019	26 December 2019	Available on Netflix in Hindi.
Dragon Ball Super	Ryō Horikawa	Vegeta	Hindi	Japanese	131	July 5, 2015 – March 25, 2018	May 22, 2022 - November 6, 2022	Aired on Cartoon Network India.
Dragon Ball Z Kai	Ryō Horikawa	Vegeta	Hindi	Japanese	167	April 5, 2009 – June 28, 2015	April 16, 2023 - November 12, 2023	Aired on Cartoon Network India

=== Live action television series ===
Program title	Actor(s)	Character(s)	Dubbed language	Original language	Episodes	Original airdate	Dubbed airdate	Notes
Small Wonder	Paul C. Scott	Reggie Williams	Hindi	English	96	7 September 1985 – 20 May 1989	1994 - 1998	This was Prasad Barve's very first role as his debut in his dubbing career. It aired on Star Plus from 1994-1998.
Power Rangers Dino Thunder	Kevin Duhaney	Ethan James / Blue Dino Thunder Ranger	Hindi	English	38	14 February - 20 November 2004		Performed alongside Ankur Javeri who voiced James Napier Robertson as Conner McKnight / Red Dino Ranger in Hindi.
Power Rangers S.P.D.	Kevin Duhaney	Ethan James / Blue Dino Ranger	Hindi	English	38 (Dubbed 2)	5 February - 14 November 2005		The actor appeared in a guest role for 2 episodes where Prasad reprised his role to dub for the character.
That's So Raven	Orlando Brown	Edward "Eddie" Thomas	Hindi	English	100	17 January 2003 – 10 November 2007	17 December 2004 - 2008	Has aired on Disney Channel India, when it first launched.
That's So Suite Life of Hannah Montana	Orlando Brown	Edward "Eddie" Thomas	Hindi	English	1	28 June 2006		A crossover special of three consistent Disney Channel sitcoms That's So Raven, The Suite Life of Zack & Cody, and Hannah Montana.
Goosebumps	Unknown actor	Unknown character	Hindi	English	74	27 October 1995 – 16 November 1998	15 May 2006 - 2009	Aired on Jetix India (Now known as Disney XD India.)
Kenan & Kel	Kenan Thompson	Kenan Rockmore	Hindi	English	62+1 TV movie	15 July 1996 – 15 July 2000		Aired on Nickelodeon India
Drake & Josh	Josh Peck	Josh Nichols	Hindi	English	56	11 January 2004 – 16 September 2007		Performed alongside Brian D'Costa as Drake Parker (Drake Bell), Meghana Erande as Megan Parker (Miranda Cosgrove), Meena Nahta as Audrey (Nancy Sullivan) and Vinod Sharma as Walter Nicols (Jonathan Goldstein).
Stranger Things	Chester Rushing	Tommy H	Hindi	English	17	15 July 2016–present		Hindi version is available for viewing on Netflix India.
Genseishin Justirisers	Isaka Tatsuya	Shouta Date/Riser Glen:	Hindi	Japanese	51	02/10/2004-24/9/2005	7/3/2007–2/7/2007	Aired on Cartoon Network India & Cartoon Network Pakistan.
Lucifer	Cameron Gharaee	Tiko	Hindi	English	67 (Dubbed 1)	2016–present		The character appeared throughout 1 episode. Also, the Hindi version of the show is available for viewing on Netflix India.
Kota Factory	Ranjan Raj	Balmukund Meena	English	Hindi	10	2019–present		

=== Live action films ===
Film title	Actor(s)	Character(s)	Dubbed language	Original language	Original year release	Dubbed year release	Notes
The Mummy	Omid Djalili	Gad Hassan	Hindi	English	1999	1999	
Cats & Dogs	Unknown Actor	Unknown Character	Hindi	English	2001	2001	
The Lord of the Rings: The Fellowship of the Ring	Dominic Monaghan	Merry Brandybuck (First Dub)	Hindi	English	2001	2002	Voiced Merry for the first Hindi Dub. A second dub was made for UTV Action in 2011, with Uplaksh Kochhar as the voice.
The Lord of the Rings: The Two Towers	Dominic Monaghan	Merry Brandybuck (First Dub)	Hindi	English	2002	2003	Voiced Merry for the first Hindi Dub. A second dub was made for UTV Action in 2011, with Uplaksh Kochhar as the voice.
The Lord of the Rings: The Return of the King	Dominic Monaghan	Merry Brandybuck (First Dub)	Hindi	English	2003	2004	Voiced Merry for the first Hindi Dub. A second dub was made for UTV Action in 2011, with Uplaksh Kochhar as the voice.
Harry Potter and the Chamber of Secrets	Tom Felton	Draco Malfoy	Hindi	English	2002	2003	Prasad only led his voice to this character in the second film only. A different voice actor dubbed him in the first movie, with Shanoor Mirza dubbing this character in next films.
Scooby-Doo	Neil Fanning	Scooby-Doo (voice)	Hindi	English	2002	2002	
Scooby-Doo 2: Monsters Unleashed	Neil Fanning	Scooby-Doo (voice)	Hindi	English	2004	2004	
The Last Samurai	Shin Koyamada	Nobutada (First Dub)	Hindi	English; Japanese	2003	2003	Performed alongside Viraj Adhav who voiced Tom Cruise as Captain Nathan Algren.
Daredevil	Scott Terra	Young Matt Murdock	Hindi	English	2003	2003	Prasad had voiced 2 characters in the Hindi dub. Performed alongside Parminder Ghumman who voiced Michael Clarke Duncan as Kingpin and Kishore Bhatt who voiced David Keith and Joe Pantoliano as Jack Murdock and Ben Urich in Hindi.
Daredevil	Leland Orser	Wesley Owen Welch	Hindi	English	2003	2003	Prasad had voiced 2 characters in the Hindi dub. Performed alongside Parminder Ghumman who voiced Michael Clarke Duncan as Kingpin and Kishore Bhatt who voiced David Keith and Joe Pantoliano as Jack Murdock and Ben Urich in Hindi.
2 Fast 2 Furious	Jin Au-Yeung	Jimmy	Hindi	English	2003	2003	Performed alongside Ankur Javeri who voiced Paul Walker † as Brian O'Conner in Hindi.
The Fast and the Furious: Tokyo Drift	Bow Wow	Twinkie	Hindi	English	2006	2006	
X-Men: The Last Stand	Ben Foster	Warren Worthington III / Angel	Hindi	English	2006	2006	Prasad had voiced two characters in the Hindi dub.
X-Men: The Last Stand	Cameron Bright	Jimmy / Leech	Hindi	English	2006	2006	Prasad had voiced two characters in the Hindi dub.
Avatar	Raja	Hero (uncredited)	Hindi	English	2009	2009	
Ant-Man	Michael Peña	Luis	Hindi	English	2015	2015	Performed alongside Sahil Vaid who voiced Paul Rudd as Scott Lang / Ant-Man in Hindi.
Ant-Man and the Wasp	Michael Peña	Luis	Hindi	English	2018	2018	Performed alongside Sahil Vaid who voiced Paul Rudd as Scott Lang / Ant-Man in Hindi.
Goosebumps	Ryan Lee	Champ	Hindi	English	2015	2015	
The Finest Hours	John Magaro	Ervin Marske	Hindi	English	2016	2016	
War Machine	John Magaro	Colonel Cogy Staggart	Hindi	English	2017	2017	
Spider-Man: Homecoming	Jacob Batalon	Ned Leeds	Hindi	English	2017	2017	
Avengers: Infinity War	Jacob Batalon	Ned Leeds	Hindi	English	2018	2018	The character had a cameo appearance.
Spider-Man: Far From Home	Jacob Batalon	Ned Leeds	Hindi	English	2019	2019	
Jurassic World: Fallen Kingdom	Justice Smith	Franklin Webb	Hindi	English	2018	2018	
Ye Mantram Vesave	Sriram Venkatesh	Jai	Hindi	Telugu	2018	2020	The Hindi dub was titled: "Pyar Ka Khel".
Spider-Man: No Way Home	Jacob Batalon	Ned Leeds	Hindi	English	2021	2021	
Aalavandhan	Unknown Actor	Young Vijay Kumar 'Vijay' and Abhay Kumar 'Abhay'	Hindi	Tamil	2001	2001	The Hindi dub was titled: "Abhay".

=== Animated films ===
Film title	Original voice(s)	Character(s)	Dubbed language	Original language	Original year release	Dubbed year release	Notes
Lady and the Tramp	Stan Freberg	Beaver	Hindi	English	1955		
Batman Beyond: Return of the Joker	Ryan O'Donohue	Matthew "Matt" McGinnis	Hindi	English	2000		
Recess: School's Out	Rickey D'Shon Collins	Vincent Pierre "Vince" LaSalle	Hindi	English	2001	2001	
Recess: All Growed Down	Rickey D'Shon Collins	Vincent Pierre "Vince" LaSalle	Hindi	English	2003	2003	
Lilo & Stitch	Chris Sanders	Experiment 626 / Stitch	Hindi	English	2002	2002	
Leroy and Stitch	Chris Sanders	Stitch and Leroy	Hindi	English	2006	2006	Both characters were originally voiced by Chris Sanders.
The Powerpuff Girls Movie	Tom Kenny	Mitch Mitchelson	Hindi	English	2002		
Barbie of Swan Lake	Ian James Corlett	Ivan	Hindi	English	2003	2004	Minor character role. Hindi dub released on VCD/DVD on 5 July 2004 and aired on Television.
The Wild	Eddie Izzard	Nigel (Monu)	Hindi	English	2006	2006	Prasad's name was mentioned in the Hindi dub credits taken from the DVD release of the film. The Hindi dub name of the movie was Jungle Masti.
Shrek the Third	Justin Timberlake	Arthur "Artie" Pendragon	Hindi	English	2007	2007	
Kung Fu Panda	Jack Black	Po	Hindi	English	2008	2008	
Kung Fu Panda 2	Jack Black	Po	Hindi	English	2011	2011	
Kung Fu Panda 3	Jack Black	Po	Hindi	English	2016	2016	
Ice Age: Dawn of the Dinosaurs	Seann William Scott	Crash	Hindi	English	2009	2009	Prasad had voiced 2 characters in the Hindi dub.
Ice Age: Dawn of the Dinosaurs	Josh Peck	Eddie	Hindi	English	2009	2009	Prasad had voiced 2 characters in the Hindi dub.
Ice Age: Continental Drift	Seann William Scott	Crash	Hindi	English	2012	2012	Prasad had voiced 2 characters in the Hindi dub.
Ice Age: Continental Drift	Josh Peck	Eddie	Hindi	English	2012	2012	Prasad had voiced 2 characters in the Hindi dub.
Ice Age: Collision Course	Seann William Scott	Crash	Hindi	English	2016	2016	Devansh Doshi voiced Josh Peck as Eddie in this movie.
The Croods	Clark Duke	Thunk Crood	Hindi	English	2013	2013	
The Angry Birds Movie	Tony Hale	Ross	Hindi	English	2016	2016	
Zootopia	Nate Torrence	Officer Benjamin Clawhauser	Hindi	English	2016	2017	Hindi dub made for Movies OK. Premiered on that channel on 17 September 2017.
Ferdinand	Gabriel Iglesias	Cuatro	Hindi	English	2017	2017	
Toy Story 4	Tony Hale	Forky	Hindi	English	2019	2019	
Dragon Ball Z: The World's Strongest	Naoki Tatsuta (JP); Brad Jackson (EN)	Oolong	Hindi	Japanese	1990		
Dragon Ball Z: The Tree of Might	Naoki Tatsuta (JP); Brad Jackson (EN)	Oolong	Hindi	Japanese	1990		
Dragon Ball Z: Lord Slug	Naoki Tatsuta (JP); Brad Jackson (EN) Mayumi Tanaka (JP); Mike McFarland (EN)	Oolong Yajirobe	Hindi	Japanese	1991		Prasad has voiced 2 characters in the Hindi dub.
Dragon Ball Z: Cooler's Revenge	Naoki Tatsuta (JP); Brad Jackson (EN) Mayumi Tanaka (JP); Mike McFarland (EN)	Oolong Yajirobe	Hindi	Japanese	1991		Prasad has voiced 2 characters in the Hindi dub.
Dragon Ball Z: The Return of Cooler	Ryō Horikawa (JP); Christopher Sabat (EN) Naoki Tatsuta (JP); Brad Jackson (EN)	Vegeta Oolong	Hindi	Japanese	1992		Prasad has voiced 2 characters in the Hindi dub.
Dragon Ball Z: Super Android 13	Ryō Horikawa (JP); Christopher Sabat (EN) Naoki Tatsuta (JP); Brad Jackson (EN)	Vegeta Oolong	Hindi	Japanese	1992		Prasad has voiced 2 characters in the Hindi dub.
Dragon Ball Z: Broly – The Legendary Super Saiyan	Ryō Horikawa (JP); Christopher Sabat (EN) Naoki Tatsuta (JP); Brad Jackson (EN)	Vegeta Oolong	Hindi	Japanese	1993		Prasad has voiced 2 characters in the Hindi dub.
Dragon Ball Z: Bojack Unbound	Ryō Horikawa (JP); Christopher Sabat (EN) Naoki Tatsuta (JP); Brad Jackson (EN)	Vegeta Oolong	Hindi	Japanese	1993		Prasad has voiced 2 characters in the Hindi dub.
Dragon Ball Z: Fusion Reborn	Ryō Horikawa (JP); Christopher Sabat (EN)	Vegeta Veku (Vegeta's voice) Gogeta (Vegeta's voice)	Hindi	Japanese	1995		Ankur Javeri provided the voice of Goku in the Hindi dub.
Dragon Ball Z: Wrath of the Dragon	Ryō Horikawa (JP); Christopher Sabat (EN) Naoki Tatsuta (JP); Brad Jackson (EN)	Vegeta Oolong	Hindi	Japanese	1995		Prasad has voiced 2 characters in the Hindi dub.
Dragon Ball Z: Bardock - The Father of Goku	Ryō Horikawa	Vegeta	Hindi	Japanese	1990	2024	
Dragon Ball Z: The History of Trunks	Ryō Horikawa	Vegeta	Hindi	Japanese	1993	2024	
Dragon Ball Z: Battle of Gods	Ryō Horikawa	Vegeta	Hindi	Japanese	2013	2022	
Dragon Ball Z: Resurrection 'F'	Ryō Horikawa	Vegeta	Hindi	Japanese	2015	2022	
Dragon Ball Super: Super Hero	Ryō Horikawa	Vegeta	Hindi	Japanese	2022	2023	
Pokémon: Mewtwo Returns	Rica Matsumoto	Ash Ketchum (Satoshi) (First Dub)	Hindi	Japanese	2000	2006	Aired on Television 6 years later, after the original Japanese release. The Hindi dub was a revised translation of the English dub, thus meaning all changes in the English dub were impact in the Hindi dubbed version. The exact air date was 14 November 2006.
Pokémon: Lucario and the Mystery of Mew	Rica Matsumoto	Ash Ketchum (Satoshi) (First Dub)	Hindi	Japanese	2005	2009 (Pakistan); 2010 (India)	Aired on Cartoon Network Pakistan in 2009, and on its Indian counterpart in 2010. The Hindi dub was a revised translation of the English dub, thus meaning all changes in the English dub were impact in the Hindi dubbed version.
Pokémon: The Rise of Darkrai	Rica Matsumoto	Ash Ketchum (Satoshi) (First Dub)	Hindi	Japanese	2007	2011	Aired on Television 4 years later, after the original Japanese release. The Hindi dub was a revised translation of the English dub, thus meaning all changes in the English dub were impact in the Hindi dubbed version.
Pokémon: Giratina and the Sky Warrior	Rica Matsumoto	Ash Ketchum (Satoshi) (First Dub)	Hindi	Japanese	2008	2011 (Pakistan)	Aired on Cartoon Network Pakistan 3 years later, after the original Japanese release. The Hindi dub was a revised translation of the English dub, thus meaning all changes in the English dub were impact in the Hindi dubbed version.
Pokémon: Arceus and the Jewel of Life	Rica Matsumoto	Ash Ketchum (Satoshi) (First Dub)	Hindi	Japanese	2009	2011 (Pakistan)	Aired on Cartoon Network Pakistan 2 years later, after the original Japanese release. The Hindi dub was a revised translation of the English dub, thus meaning all changes in the English dub were impact in the Hindi dubbed version.
Pokémon: Zoroark: Master of Illusions	Rica Matsumoto	Ash Ketchum (Satoshi) (First Dub)	Hindi	Japanese	2010	2012 (Pakistan)	Aired on Cartoon Network Pakistan 2 years later, after the original Japanese release. The Hindi dub was a revised translation of the English dub, thus meaning all changes in the English dub were impact in the Hindi dubbed version.

== See also ==
- List of Indian dubbing artists
