= Graduate (film) =

- Directed by: Prasad Rayala
- Written by: Prasad Rayala
- Produced by: Shivaji Attaluri
- Starring: Akshay; Rithika Sood; Tashu Kaushik
- Cinematography: Murali
- Music by: Sandeep
- Distributed by: Script Technologies Pvt Ltd.
- Release date: 7 January 2011
- Country: India
- Language: Telugu

Graduate is a 2011 Indian Telugu language romance film written and directed by Prasad Rayala. It stars debutants Akshay and Rithika Sood in the lead roles alongside Tashu Kaushik. Murali has handled the camera and Sandeep has composed the music. This film has been released in the first week of January 2011.

== Plot ==
This film is completely youth centric with romance as the backdrop.

== Cast ==
- Akshay as Chakri
- Tashu Kaushik as Manisha
- Rithika Sood as Rithika
- Manoj Chandra
- Ranjeet Somi
- Chandramohan as Manisha's father
- Brahmanandam as Bhikshapati

== Soundtrack ==
The music of the film is composed by Sandeep.

No.	Title	Lyrics	Performer(s)	Length
1.	"Maruvaleni Nesthama"	Desi Raju	Bunty, Siddhartha
2.	"Gadichina Kashanamu"	Ravi Eruvinti	Deepu, Revanth, Shravana Bhargavi
3.	"Ninnala Nenu Lenu"	Ravi Eruvinti	Anuj Gurwara, Shravana Bhargavi
4.	"1234"	Amjad	Geetha Madhuri, Siddhartha
5.	"Priyathama"	Ravi Eruvinti	Pranavi, Siddhartha
