= Abhirami =

Abhirami may refer to:

== People ==
- Abhirami (actress, born 1983), an Indian actress and television host
- Ammu Abhirami (born 2000), Indian actress, also known mononymously as "Abhirami"
- Abhirami Ajai, an Indian playback singer
- Abhirami Pattar, a Hindu saint from the South Indian state of Tamil Nadu
- Abhirami Suresh, an Indian actress and musician
- Abhirami Venkatachalam, an Indian actress who appears in Tamil films

== Films ==
- Abhirami (1992 film), a Tamil language drama film
- Abhirami (2024 film), an Indian Malayalam-language comedy drama film

== See also ==
- Abiram, a name
