= Orijinal =

2026 Indian Malayalam-language film

- Theatrical release poster
- Directed by: Ramees
- Written by: Ramees
- Produced by: Maz Media; Ziku Films; Harshad
- Starring: Sreenath Bhasi; Femina George
- Cinematography: Fahad Fatli
- Edited by: Shafique Mohamed Ali
- Music by: Electronic Kili
- Production companies: Maz Media; Tempora Talkies
- Distributed by: Maz Media
- Release date: 23 October 2026
- Running time: 132 minutes
- Country: India
- Language: Malayalam

Orijinal is a 2026 Indian Malayalam-language science fiction film written and directed by Ramees. Produced by Maz Media and Ziku Films, it stars Sreenath Bhasi, Abhiram Radhakrishnan, Rajesh Madhavan, Binu Pappu and Femina George.

The film's cinematography was handled by Fahad Fatli, with editing by Shafique Mohamed Ali. The soundtrack and background score were composed by Electronic Kili.

Orijinal was released theatrically on 23 October 2026.

== Cast ==
- Sreenath Bhasi
- Abhiram Radhakrishnan
- Rajesh Madhavan
- Saafboi
- Binu Pappu
- Femina George
- Sreekanth Vettiyar
- Stini Francis
- Gokulan
- Aneesh Gopinath
- Arun Pradeep
- Subin Tarzan

== Soundtrack ==
Orijinal

Soundtrack album by Electronic Kili
- Released: 2026
- Recorded: 2026
- Studios: Sonic Island, Ernakulam; 20Hz Music Hub, Ernakulam
- Genre: Feature film soundtrack
- Length: 9:10
- Language: Malayalam
- Label: Think Music

The film's soundtrack was composed by Electronic Kili, with audio rights acquired by Think Music. The first single, "Maale Mallikkothe", was released on 28 August 2026. It was followed by the second single, "Big Bang", on 22 September 2026, and the third single, "Karkalamegham", on 21 October 2026.

No.	Title	Lyrics	Singer(s)	Length
1.	"Maale Mallikkothe"	Muthu	Kavitha Kaliyappan	03:16
2.	"Big Bang"	Joe Anton, Vijay Anand, Muthu	Sreenath Bhasi	03:08
3.	"Karkalamegham"	Ramees, Vijay Anand	Sushin Shyam	02:46
Total length:				9:10

== Release ==
Orijinal was released theatrically on 23 October 2026.

== Reception ==
Siya Viju of Mathrubhumi gave 3/5 and wrote Orijinal "may not reinvent the time-travel genre, but it brings something different to Malayalam cinema. It is a commendable debut that tries something different without making the audience work unnecessarily hard to follow it." Arun Madhusoodanan of Mathrubhumi called Orijinal a unique attempt in Malayalam cinema, adding that by blending the concept of time travel with a familiar setting, the film successfully makes the premise relatable to the audience. Arun praised the film for its bold approach, Sreenath Bhasi's performance and the technical aspects.

Aswin Bharadwaj of Lensmen Reviews praised Sreenath Bhasi's convincing performance and noted the film's ambitious attempt to explore deep ethical dilemmas. A reviewer for Asianet News described the film as an engaging fantasy thriller, praising the humor, Sreenath Bhasi's energetic dual performance and the way the time-travel narrative avoids becoming overly complicated.

S. R. Praveen of The Hindu wrote "In Orijinal, the time travel trope becomes an excuse for the portrayal of a man introspecting his life choices and then using the accidental gift of time travel to make amends, not always in the right way." Anandu Suresh of The Indian Express rated the film 2.5 out of 5 stars, appreciating its focus on moral conflict and character drama over complex scientific jargon. While he praised Sreenath Bhasi's subtle ability to distinguish his dual roles, he felt the film was hindered by underdeveloped supporting characters and a dragged-out epilogue. Nadeer Ashraf of Timeline Daily commended debutant director Ramees for successfully navigating a complex, emotionally anchored story about choices and consequences. He highlighted Electronic Kili's cohesive soundtrack and praised Bhasi for delivering a stunning and natural performance devoid of unnecessary melodrama.
