= Bougainvillea (film) =

2024 Malayalam film by Amal Neerad

- Theatrical Release Poster
- Directed by: Amal Neerad
- Written by: Lajo Jose; Amal Neerad
- Additional dialogues: RJ Murugan; Venkatesh VSA
- Based on: Ruthinte Lokam by Lajo Jose
- Produced by: Jyothirmayi; Kunchacko Boban
- Starring: Kunchacko Boban; Jyothirmayi; Fahadh Faasil
- Cinematography: Anend C. Chandran
- Edited by: Vivek Harshan
- Music by: Sushin Shyam
- Production companies: Amal Neerad Productions; Udaya Pictures
- Distributed by: A & A Release
- Release date: 17 October 2024
- Running time: 144 minutes
- Country: India
- Language: Malayalam
- Budget: ₹20 crore
- Box office: ₹36 crore

Bougainvillea is a 2024 Indian Malayalam-language psychological thriller film directed by Amal Neerad, who co-wrote the script with Lajo Jose. It is jointly produced by Amal Neerad Productions and Udaya Pictures. The film stars Kunchacko Boban, Jyothirmayi and Fahadh Faasil in the lead roles alongside Veena Nandakumar, Srinda and Sharaf U Dheen in supporting roles. It was inspired by Lajo Jose's novel Ruthinte Lokam (2019) and marks Jyothirmayi's comeback to cinema after an 11-year hiatus.

Bougainvillea was released worldwide on 17 October 2024 in theatres and received mixed reviews from critics. The film later began streaming on SonyLIV from 13 December 2024.The film was a commercial success at box office.

== Plot ==
Royce John and Reethu, a happily married couple, find their lives gets shattered after a devastating accident, which leaves Reethu an amnesiac. Eight years later, they both live at a hill station near Kottayam with their two children, Emma and Ryan. While Royce leaves to the hospital for work and the kids are sent to school, Reethu is taken care of by their maid, Rema. Reethu has an obsession for painting and paints Bougainvillea flowers in all her paintings. Royce collects her paintings in the ruse of selling them to an art gallery but actually stores them in his farm house.

Chaya Karthikeyan, a student goes missing. ACP David Koshy, the lead investigator in the missing case of Chaya, identifies Reethu as his prime suspect, as she is revealed to have been on the premises of the college hostel where Chaya studied, right before she went missing. As she is interrogated, Reethu admits that she doesn't remember being there when David shows her photo on the hostel premises.

She says that she recalls seeing Rema beside Chaya, leading to David questioning Rema and her husband Biju, who reveal that they were out of station for their relative's marriage during the alleged time. A confused David questions Royce, who reveals that Reethu has created her own world and lost her memory after her accident. Further to David's shock, Royce reveals that they have no kids and they are hallucinations of Reethu.

Biju decides to keep Rema away from Reethu for her safety. Royce guarantees no further trouble from Reethu's side thereafter and brings Rema back to the house. After a bit of introspection, Reethu remembers that it was she, herself beside Chaya, not Rema.

Meanwhile, two more girls go missing. David hires Meera Yashodara, an expert criminologist to gouge out the truth from Reethu and unravel the mystery behind the missing cases.

Meera begins interrogating Reethu. Reethu states that she remembers herself drowning while trying to recall the past. As Royce is questioned about her drowning, he assumes that she might have a drowning episode somewhere in her childhood and that might still be haunting her. Reethu reveals that she writes her experiences on pieces of paper and tucks them under her bed, only to find them go missing daily.

David and Meera go to meet Manu Philip, the doctor who treated Reethu following her accident to enquire about her. And Meera conducts a hearing therapy on Reethu in an attempt to get some evidence from her, but all in vain. One night, Reethu visits Meera's house with Biju and Rema and finds out that she too is missing. In a shocking twist, Meera is shown as being kidnapped and sedated by Royce in his farm house, which is actually his ancestral house owned by his late grandfather, Devassy. Years ago, a young Royce had followed the evil path of Devassy who forcefully kidnapped girls and raped them to death.

Back to the present, Reethu arrives at Royce's ancestral home along with Biju and Rema to inform Royce about Meera's disappearance. Royce locks up Reethu and Rema inside the house and kills Biju. Reethu, witnessing this, breaks the door and urges Rema to escape, only to be hit by Royce. Rema is taken to the room where Meera is kept sedated. He takes Reethu to the room where her Bougainvillea paintings are kept and burns them, which helps Reethu recall her past. In a shocking revelation, Royce committed the kidnappings of the three girls along with Reethu, after which she was drowned by Royce to hinder her memory. He had stolen the paper chits which Reethu kept under the bed, in which, on one of them she wrote about Meera revealing to her that she had no children. Reethu tries to escape the house as the dogs, raised as the pets in the house, chase after her. Royce takes the shotgun of Devassy and follows her traces. Reethu falls in a deep pond and one of the dogs jumps into the water, scaring her. Royce shoots the dog and takes Reethu to the house and forces her to inject the sedative to herself. At this point, Meera musters up strength and strangles Royce with a chain, who throws the shotgun at Reethu who was running to inform the police. After Royce breaks the chain, he tries to convince Reethu that Meera is psychotic and is trying to harm them and their "kids". Reethu, who is convinced that she has no children, takes the shotgun and shoots Royce, after which he is smashed with a chair by Rema for avenging Biju's death.

David arrives and finds the three of them at the farm house. They are taken into David's custody and reveal him Royce's true identity. Shocked, David says that Royce left no clues to suspect him and had a strong alibi as a doctor, convincing him that he always stood beside Reethu, protecting her as a husband. David also tells Reethu that her real name is Esther, and she was the only victim who was not killed by Royce. The accident from her past may have been her trying to escape from Royce's clutches when they committed the kidnappings. The next morning, David leaves after being called back to Theni. Reethu, now as Esther, goes to meet Royce, who is now in jail. Hence, the dark cases of the missing are unraveled.

== Cast ==
- Kunchacko Boban as Dr. Royce John, Reethu's husband
  - Dilan Derin George as young Royce
- Jyothirmayi as Reethu (Esther Emmanuel)
- Fahadh Faasil as ACP David Koshy IPS, the investigating officer
- Veena Nandakumar as Dr. Meera Yasodhara, criminologist
- Sharaf U Dheen as Biju, Rema's husband
- Srinda as Rema, Reethu's maid
- Shobi Thilakan as Inspector Suresh Rajan, the officer who assists David in the investigation
- Amala Rose Kurian as Amala Kurian
- Jinu Joseph as Dr. Manu Philip
- Nisthar Sait as Madathani Puthanparambil Devassiya, Royce's grandfather
- Vijilesh Karayad as Art gallery manager
- Athira Patel as Chaya Karthikeyan
- Varsha Ramesh as Jennifer
- Geethi Sangeetha as Sangeetha
- Naveena V M as Vareeth's wife
- Rohini Rahul as Royce's mother

== Production ==
Principal photography started in September 2023 and went on until April 2024 in secret. The music is composed by Sushin Shyam, the cinematography is handled by Anend C. Chandran and the editing is done by Vivek Harshan. It is an adaptation of the 2019 novel Ruthinte Lokam, an intriguing title written by Lajo Jose.

== Music ==
Bougainvillea

Soundtrack album by Sushin Shyam
- Released: 24 October 2024
- Recorded: 2023–2024
- Genre: Feature film soundtrack
- Length: 12:50
- Language: Malayalam
- Label: Sony Music India
- Producer: Sushin Shyam

Official audio
- Bougainvillea (Jukebox) on YouTube

No.	Title	Lyrics	Singer(s)	Length
1.	"Sthuthi"	Vinayak Sasikumar	Mary Ann Alexander, Sushin Shyam	2:59
2.	"Maravikale"	Rafeeq Ahamed	Madhuvanthi Narayan	4:18
3.	"Transcendence" (Instrumental)	–	–	2:56
4.	"Dead Can Dance" (Instrumental)	–	–	2:43
Total length:				12:50

== Reception ==
Vignesh Madhu of The New Indian Express rated 2.5 out of 5 and stated: "we have seen many celebrated filmmakers becoming victims of their own formulas. Though not yet there, it would only help if Amal opts for fresher treatments rather than rehashing his own templates". S. R. Praveen of The Hindu said that "Bougainvillea ends up as an unsatisfying psychological thriller, carrying much of the imperfections of the original story [Ruthinte Lokam]". He also criticized the casting of Fahadh and Sharaf U Dheen, they did not have much to play in it.

== Awards ==
Award	Category	Recipient	Ref.
55th Kerala State Film Awards	Best Screenplay (Adaptation)	Lajo Jose; Amal Neerad	
55th Kerala State Film Awards	Best Choreography	Sumesh Sundar; Jishnudas M B	
55th Kerala State Film Awards	Best Music Director (Songs) ("Maravikale" and "Sthuthi")	Sushin Shyam	
55th Kerala State Film Awards	Best Makeup Artist	Ronex Xavier	
55th Kerala State Film Awards	Best Processing Lab / Colourist	Poetic Home of Cinema	
55th Kerala State Film Awards	Best Costume Designer	Sameera Saneesh	
55th Kerala State Film Awards	Best Actress (Special Mention)	Jyothirmayi	

== Controversy ==
A formal complaint has been filed against a promo song from the film, titled "Sthuthi". The complaint, submitted to the Ministry of Information and Broadcasting and the Central Board of Film Certification by Tony Chittilappilly, Secretary of the Syro-Malabar Sabha Almaya, claims the song distorts Christian beliefs and is offensive to the community.
