= Lajo Jose =

Indian writer of Malayalam literature

- Born: Kottayam, Kerala, India
- Occupations: Writer, Screenwriter
- Writing career
- Genre: Fiction
- Notable works: Coffee House; Hydrangea; Ruthinte Lokam
- Literary movement: Crime fiction

Lajo Jose is an Indian writer and screenwriter, predominantly works in Malayalam literature and cinema. He is known for his crime thriller and mystery novels which include Coffee House, Hydrangea, Ruthinte Lokam, Rest in Peace and Kanya Maria. His latest work is Orange Thottathile Athidhi, published by Mathrubhumi Books in 2023. He has also co-written the screenplay of a movie, Bougainvillea, where the director Amal Neerad is the co-writer.

== Biography ==
Lajo Jose was born in Kottayam district of the south Indian state of Kerala. His works contribute to academic research and literary studies related to Crime Fiction in Malayalam. After his education, he joined the insurance sector where he held the position of a regional manager at Max Life Insurance before quitting the job in 2015. Subsequently, he focused on writing, initially screenplays but he did not succeed in getting any foothold in film industry which made him turn to fiction and his first novel, Coffee House, was published in May 2018. His next work, Hydrangea, was a success with three editions coming out in a single month. Both Coffee House and Hydrangea are part of the Esther Emmanuel series. This was followed by Ruthinte Lokam in 2019, Rest in Peace, a cozy mystery, in 2020 published by Mathrubhumi Books. and 'Kanya Maria', a DC Books publication, in 2022. The latest of his works is 'Orange Thottathile Athidhi', published by Mathrubhumi Books, in 2023.

Lajo Jose has written the script of Bougainvillea, a 2024 Amal Neerad movie, with Kunchacko Boban, Fahadh Faasil and Jyothirmayi in the lead.

== Bibliography ==
Year	Title	Title in English	Category	Publisher
2018	Coffee House	Coffee House	Crime thriller	Thrissur: Green Books
2019	Ruthinte Lokam	The World Of Ruth	Psychological thriller	Kottayam: DC Books
2019	Hydrangea	Hydrangea	Investigative thriller	Calicut: Mathrubhumi Books
2020	Rest In Peace	Rest In Peace	Crime fiction	Calicut: Mathrubhumi Books
2022	Kanya Maria	Virgin Mary	Crime thriller	Kottayam: DC Books
2023	Orange Thottathile Athidhi	Guest In The Orange Orchard	Crime thriller	Kottayam: DC Books

== Filmography ==
Year	Film	Director	Contribution	Notes
2024	Bougainvillea	Amal Neerad	Screenplay	Debut as a scriptwriter

== Awards and Honours ==
2024: 55th Kerala State Film Awards:

- Kerala State Film Award for Best Screenplay (Adapted) - Bougainvillea

== See also ==
- James Patterson
- Kottayam Pushpanath
