= Shaju Sreedhar =

Indian actor

- Other name: Kalabhavan Shaju
- Occupations: Actor, comedian, mimicry artist, television actor
- Years active: 1995–present
- Spouse: Chandini Shaju
- Children: Niranjana Shaju, Neelanjana Shaju

Shaju Sreedhar, also known as Kalabhavan Shaju, is an Indian actor and mimicry artist known for his work in Malayalam cinema. He began his career as a stage artist and mimicry performer before transitioning into films. Over the years, he has appeared in numerous supporting roles, often portraying comedic, character, or antagonist roles.

== Early life and education ==
Shaju completed his schooling at Mundur High School and pursued higher education at the Co-operative Arts and Science College. During his college years, he became active in mimicry and stage performances, eventually joining a professional mimicry troupe.

== Career ==
Shaju Sreedhar began his artistic career with the Kalabhavan troupe.

He made his film debut in 1995 with Mimics Action 500. Since then, he has acted in a wide variety of roles across multiple genres including drama, comedy, thrillers, and family entertainers. Shaju is also a member of the Association of Malayalam Movie Artists (AMMA).

== Filmography ==
| Year | Title | Role | Notes |
|---|---|---|---|
| 1995 | Mimics Action 500 | | Debut film |
| 1995 | Kidilolkkidilam | | |
| 1995 | Mazhavilkoodaram | | |
| 1995 | Kalamasseriyil Kalyanayogam | | |
| 1996 | Mimics Super 1000 | | |
| 1996 | Aramana Veedum Anjoorekkarum | Pushpan | |
| 1996 | KL 7/95 Ernakulam North | | |
| 1996 | Rajaputhran | Appu | |
| 1996 | Dominic Presentation | | |
| 1997 | Newspaper Boy | | |
| 1997 | Hitler Brothers | | |
| 1997 | Moonu Kodiyum 300 Pavanum | | |
| 1997 | Poothumbiyum Poovalanmarum | | |
| 1998 | British Market | James | |
| 1998 | Maayajalam | | |
| 1998 | Chenaparambile Aanakkaaryam | | |
| 1998 | Sooryaputhran | | |
| 1999 | Auto Brothers | | |
| 1999 | Indhulekha | | |
| 1999 | Chithrathoonukal | | |
| 1999 | Mimics Ghost | | |
| 2000 | Mark Antony | | |
| 2000 | Ival Draupadi | | |
| 2000 | Korappan The Great | | |
| 2000 | Mera Naam Joker | | |
| 2001 | Thillaana Thillaana | | |
| 2001 | Nalacharitham Naalam Divasam | | |
| 2002 | Aaradyam Parayum | | |
| 2003 | Pulival Kalyanam | Murali | |
| 2003 | Chakram | | |
| 2003 | Pathinonnil Vyazham | | |
| 2003 | Maayaamohithachandran | | |
| 2004 | Freedom | | |
| 2005 | Hai | | |
| 2008 | Pakal Nakshatrangal | | |
| 2009 | Swantham Lekhakan | Martin | |
| 2009 | Ivar Vivahitharayal | | |
| 2010 | Happy Husbands | | |
| 2010 | Kaaryasthan | Himself | |
| 2011 | City of God | Vijayan | |
| 2011 | Janapriyan | | |
| 2011 | Vellaripraavinte Changaathi | | |
| 2011 | Bhakthajanangalude Sradhaykku | | |
| 2012 | Thiruvambadi Thamban | Kannan | |
| 2012 | Kunjaliyan | | |
| 2012 | Ee Thirakkinidayil | | |
| 2012 | Husbands in Goa | | |
| 2012 | Molly Aunty Rocks | | |
| 2013 | Romans | Mathukkutty | |
| 2013 | Lissamayude Veedu | | |
| 2013 | Sound Thoma | Viswanbharan | |
| 2014 | Angry Babies in Love | | |
| 2014 | Mizhi Thudaku | | |
| 2014 | The Power of Silence | | |
| 2014 | Garbhasreeman | | |
| 2014 | Raajaadhiraaja | | |
| 2014 | Life | | |
| 2014 | The Dolphins | | |
| 2016 | Ithu Thaanda Police | Chettiyar | |
| 2016 | Paavada | MLA's brother-in-law | |
| 2017 | Ramaleela | | |
| 2019 | Irupathiyonnaam Noottaandu | | |
| 2020 | Anjaam Pathiraa | Paulson | |
| 2020 | Ayyappanum Koshiyum | Joekuttan | |
| 2021 | #Home | Mobile Shop Owner | |
| 2021 | Kurup | | |
| 2022 | Saudi Vellakka | Advocate Shaju | |
| 2022 | Theerppu | Menon | |
| 2022 | Solomonte Theneechakal | Kunju Muhammed | |
| 2022 | Night Drive | Anil Nair (Channel Head) | |
| 2022 | Ini Utharam | | |
| 2022 | Route Map | | |
| 2023 | Theeppori Benny | Manthan Baby | |
| 2023 | Sesham Mike-il Fathima | L. P. Gopakumar | |
| 2024 | Gumasthan | Sivaraman | |
| 2024 | Guardian Angel | | |
| 2025 | Rekhachithram | Inspector Salim | |
| 2025 | Padakkalam | Professor | |
| 2025 | Thalavara | Sandhya's father | |
| 2025 | Ambalamukkile Visheshangal | | |
| 2025 | Aghosham | Sebastian Sir | |
| 2026 | Valathu Vashathe Kallan | DySP Firoz | |
| 2026 | Ashakal Aayiram | | |
| 2026 | Bhishmar | | |
| 2026 | Uyir | | |
| 2026 | Unmadham | Sumesh | |
| 2026 | Avaraachan & Sons | | |

== Television ==
In addition to his film work, Shaju Sreedhar has also appeared in several Malayalam television serials and comedy shows. His television appearances have further cemented his popularity among family audiences.

== Personal life ==
Shaju is married to actress Chandini Shaji, known for her performances in popular Malayalam films such as Sathyabhamakku Oru Premalekhanam, Dilliwala Rajakumaran, and Vazhunnor. The couple has two daughters, Nandana Shaji and Neelanjana Shaji, both of whom have appeared as child actors in recent Malayalam films. Shaju and Chandini often shares glimpses of their personal life, including wedding anniversary celebrations and interviews reflecting on their relationship.

In interviews, Shaju has openly discussed his views on love and relationships, expressing concern about the lack of sincerity in modern romantic dynamics.

== Recognition ==
In 2024, Shaju Sreedhar was awarded the prestigious UAE Golden Visa, a recognition given to individuals who have made significant contributions in their respective fields.

Shaju has also spoken candidly about his aspirations and challenges in the industry. In an in-depth interview, he discussed the emotional and creative aspects of his career, referring to his professional journey as a pursuit of his dreams.

He remains active in both films and media, continuing to contribute meaningfully to Malayalam cinema.
