= 55th Kerala State Film Awards =

State awards for Malayalam films of 2024

- Awarded for: Best works in Malayalam cinema in a selected year
- Date: 3 November 2025
- Location: Thiruvananthapuram
- Country: India
- Presented by: Kerala State Chalachitra Academy
- First award: 1969

Highlights
- Most wins: Manjummel Boys
- Website: keralafilm.com

The 55th Kerala State Film Awards were presented on 3rd November 2025 by the Kerala State Chalachitra Academy for the best works in Malayalam Cinema in the year 2024. The names of the recipients were announced by Saji Cherian, the Minister of Cultural Affairs, Kerala. A total of 128 films were submitted for the awards. The jury for the awards under the film category was headed by Prakash Raj and the jury for awards under the writing category by Madhu Eravankara.

== Writing category ==
=== Jury ===
• Madhu Eravankara (chairman)
| • A Chandrashekar | • Vineetha Vijayan |
• C. Ajoy

=== Awards ===
All award recipients receive a cash prize, certificate and statuette.

| Name of award | Title of work | Awardee(s) | Cash prize |
|---|---|---|---|
| Best Book on Cinema | Pennpaattu Tharakal | C S Meenakshi | ₹30,000 |
| Best Article on Cinema | Marayunna Naalukettukal | Valsalan Vathussery | ₹20,000 |

=== Special Mention ===
All recipients receive a certificate and statuette.

| Name of award | Title | Awardee(s) |
|---|---|---|
| Book on Cinema | Samayathinte Vistheernam | Naufal Mariyam Bathu |
| Article on Cinema | No Award | No Award |

== Film category ==
=== Jury ===
Final jury
• Prakash Raj (chairman)
| • Ranjan Pramod | • Jibu Jacob |
| • Bhagyalakshmi | • Santhosh Aechikkanam |
| • Gayatri Asokan | • Nithin Lukose |
• C. Ajoy

First Preliminary jury
• Ranjan Pramod (chairman)
| • Subal K. R. | • M C Rajanarayanan |
| • Vijayarajamallika | • C. Ajoy |

Second Preliminary jury
• Jibu Jacob (chairman)
| • V. C. Abhilash | • Rajesh K |
| • Shamshad Hussain | • C. Ajoy |

=== Awards ===
All award recipients receive a cash prize, certificate and statuette.

| Name of award | Title of film | Awardee(s) | Cash prize |
|---|---|---|---|
| Best Film | Manjummel Boys | Director: Chidambaram S. Poduval | ₹200,000 |
| Best Film | Manjummel Boys | Producer: Soubin Shahir; Babu Shahir; Shawn Antony | ₹200,000 |
| Second Best Film | Feminichi Fathima | Director: Fasil Muhammed | ₹150,000 |
| Second Best Film | Feminichi Fathima | Producer: Thamar K V Sudheesh Skaria | ₹150,000 |
| Best Director | Manjummel Boys | Chidambaram S. Poduval | ₹200,000 |
| Best Actor | Bramayugam | Mammootty | ₹100,000 |
| Best Actress | Feminichi Fathima | Shamla Hamza | ₹100,000 |
| Best Character Actor | Manjummel Boys | Soubin Shahir | ₹50,000 |
| Best Character Actor | Bramayugam | Sidharth Bharathan | ₹50,000 |
| Best Character Actress | Nadanna Sambhavam | Lijomol Jose | ₹50,000 |
| Best Child Artist | No Award | | |
| Best Story | Paradise | Prasanna Vithanage | ₹50,000 |
| Best Cinematography | Manjummel Boys | Shyju Khalid | ₹25,000 |
| Best Screenplay (Original) | Manjummel Boys | Chidambaram S. Poduval | ₹50,000 |
| Best Screenplay (Adaptation) | Bougainvillea | Lajo Jose; Amal Neerad | ₹50,000 |
| Best Lyrics | Manjummel Boys ("Viyyarppu Thunniyitta Kuppayam") | Vedan | ₹50,000 |
| Best Music Director (songs) | Bougainvillea ("Sthuthi") | Sushin Shyam | ₹50,000 |
| Best Music Director (score) | Bramayugam | Christo Xavier | ₹50,000 |
| Best Male Singer | A. R. M. ("Kiliye") | K. S. Harisankar | ₹50,000 |
| Best Female Singer | Am Ah ("Aarorum") | Zeba Tommy | ₹50,000 |
| Best Editor | Kishkindha Kaandam | Sooraj E S | ₹50,000 |
| Best Art Director | Manjummel Boys | Ajayan Chalissery | ₹50,000 |
| Best Sync Sound | Pani | Ajayan Adat | ₹50,000 |
| Best Sound Mixing | Manjummel Boys | Fasal A Bhakkar; Shijin Melvin Hutton | ₹50,000 |
| Best Sound Design | Manjummel Boys | Shijin Melvin Hutton; Abhishek Nair | ₹50,000 |
| Best Processing Lab / Colourist | Bougainvillea; Manjummel Boys | Poetic Home of Cinema | ₹25,000 |
| Best Makeup Artist | Bougainvillea; Bramayugam | Ronex Xavier | ₹50,000 |
| Best Costume Designer | Bougainvillea; Rekhachithram | Sameera Saneesh | ₹50,000 |
| Best Dubbing Artist | Barroz 3D'(Character:Voodoo) | Bhasi Vaikom (Male category) | ₹50,000 |
| Best Dubbing Artist | Barroz 3D (Character: Muwesi Maria ) | Sayanora Philip (Female category) | ₹50,000 |
| Best Choreography | Bougainvillea | Sumesh Sundar; Jishnudas M B | ₹50,000 |
| Best Film with Popular Appeal and Aesthetic Value | Premalu | Director: Girish A. D. | ₹100,000 |
| Best Film with Popular Appeal and Aesthetic Value | Premalu | Producer: Fahadh Faasil; Shyam Pushkaran; Dileesh Pothan | ₹100,000 |
| Best Debut Director | Feminichi Fathima | Fasil Muhammed | ₹100,000 |
| Best Children's Film | No Award | | |
| Best Visual Effects | A. R. M. | Jithin Lal; Alfred Tomy; Anirudha Mukherjee; Salim Lahir | ₹50,000 |

=== Special Mention ===
All recipients receive a certificate and statuette.

| Name of award | Title of film | Awardee(s) | Awarded for |
|---|---|---|---|
| Special Mention | A. R. M. | Tovino Thomas | Acting |
| Special Mention | Kishkindha Kaandam | Asif Ali | Acting |
| Special Mention | Paradise | Darshana Rajendran | Acting |
| Special Mention | Bougainvillea | Jyothirmayi | Acting |
| Special Mention | Paradise | Producers: Anto Chitillapilly Sanita Chittilapilly Director: Prasanna Vithanage | Film |

=== Special Award in Any Category for Women/Transgender ===
All recipients receive a cash prize, certificate, and statuette.

| Name of award | Title of film | Awardee(s) | Awarded for | Cash prize |
|---|---|---|---|---|
| Special Award in Any Category for Women/Transgender | All We Imagine as Light | Payal Kapadia | Direction | ₹50,000 |
