= Karakkam =

2026 Indian Malayalam-language film

- Theatrical release poster
- Directed by: Subhash Lalitha Subrahmanian
- Written by: Nipin Narayanan; Subhash L. S.; Arjun Narayanan; Dhanush Varghese
- Produced by: Kimberly G. Trinidade; Ankush Singh
- Starring: Sreenath Bhasi; Femina George
- Cinematography: Bablu Aju
- Edited by: Nidhin Raj Arol
- Music by: Sam C. S.
- Production companies: Krown Stars Entertainment; Black Turtle Productions
- Release date: 28 May 2026
- Country: India
- Language: Malayalam

Karakkam is a 2026 Indian Malayalam-language musical comedy horror film directed by Subhash Lalitha Subrahmanian, who co-wrote the screenplay with Nipin Narayanan and Arjun Narayanan (Story written by Dhanush Varghese ) . Produced by Kimberly G. Trinidade and Ankush Singh under Krown Stars Entertainment and Black Turtle Productions, the film stars Sreenath Bhasi and Femina George, alongside Praveen T. J., Abhiram Radhakrishnan, Shaun Romy and Sidharth Bharathan. The film's cinematography was handled by Bablu Aju, with editing by Nidhin Raj Arol. The soundtrack and background score were composed by Sam C. S..

Karakkam was released theatrically on 28 May 2026.

== Cast ==
- Sreenath Bhasi as Dhanush
- Femina George as Pinki
- Praveen T. J. as Khaja
- Abhiram Radhakrishnan as Nakulan
- Shaun Romy as Rani Maria
- Sidharth Bharathan as Inspector Kunjan Nambiar
- Bijukuttan as Harishchandra
- Midhutty as Freddy
- Manikandan R. Achari as Chackochan
- Jean Paul Lal as Jackson

== Soundtrack ==
Karakkam

Soundtrack album by Sam C. S.
- Released: 2025-2026
- Recorded: 2025
- Studio: Psalter Record Inn, Chennai; Blu Academy, Chennai
- Genre: Feature film soundtrack
- Length: 14:19
- Language: Malayalam
- Label: T-Series

The soundtrack album of the film is composed by Sam C. S. T-Series procured the audio rights of the soundtrack. The first single Yakshiye Chiri was released on 22 December 2025. The second single Thirichu Ponam was released on 19 March 2026.

No.	Title	Lyrics	Singer(s)	Length
1.	"Yakshiye Chiri"	Muhsin Parari	Sam C. S.	02:43
2.	"Thirichu Ponam"	Anwar Ali	Resmi Sateesh	03:06
3.	"Ore Yathrayil"	Anwar Ali	Sithara	02:29
4.	"Dummilu Vaanga Nee"	Hareesh Mohanan	Pranavam Sasi	03:09
5.	"Pikkilikki Pikkilikki"	Hareesh Mohanan	Anthony Daasan	02:52
Total length:				14:19

== Release ==
Karakkam was released theatrically on 28 May 2026.

== Reception ==
=== Critical reception ===
Arun Madhusoodanan of Mathrubhumi wrote that Karakkam "presents a lot of cinematic experiences in a short amount of time without boring the audience," adding that there is much more to experience beyond a mere ghost movie. A reviewer for Asianet News praised the relatable cast, noting that the role of Dhanush was right in Sreenath Bhasi's comfort zone, and called the film an unpretentious release that arrives "with a guarantee of entertainment." Furthermore, C. J. Sudhi of Malayala Manorama commended the film's freshness, stating that it belongs to a genre rarely experimented with in Malayalam cinema, and that this unique choice helps it stand out.
