= Vinod Bharathan =

Indian film director

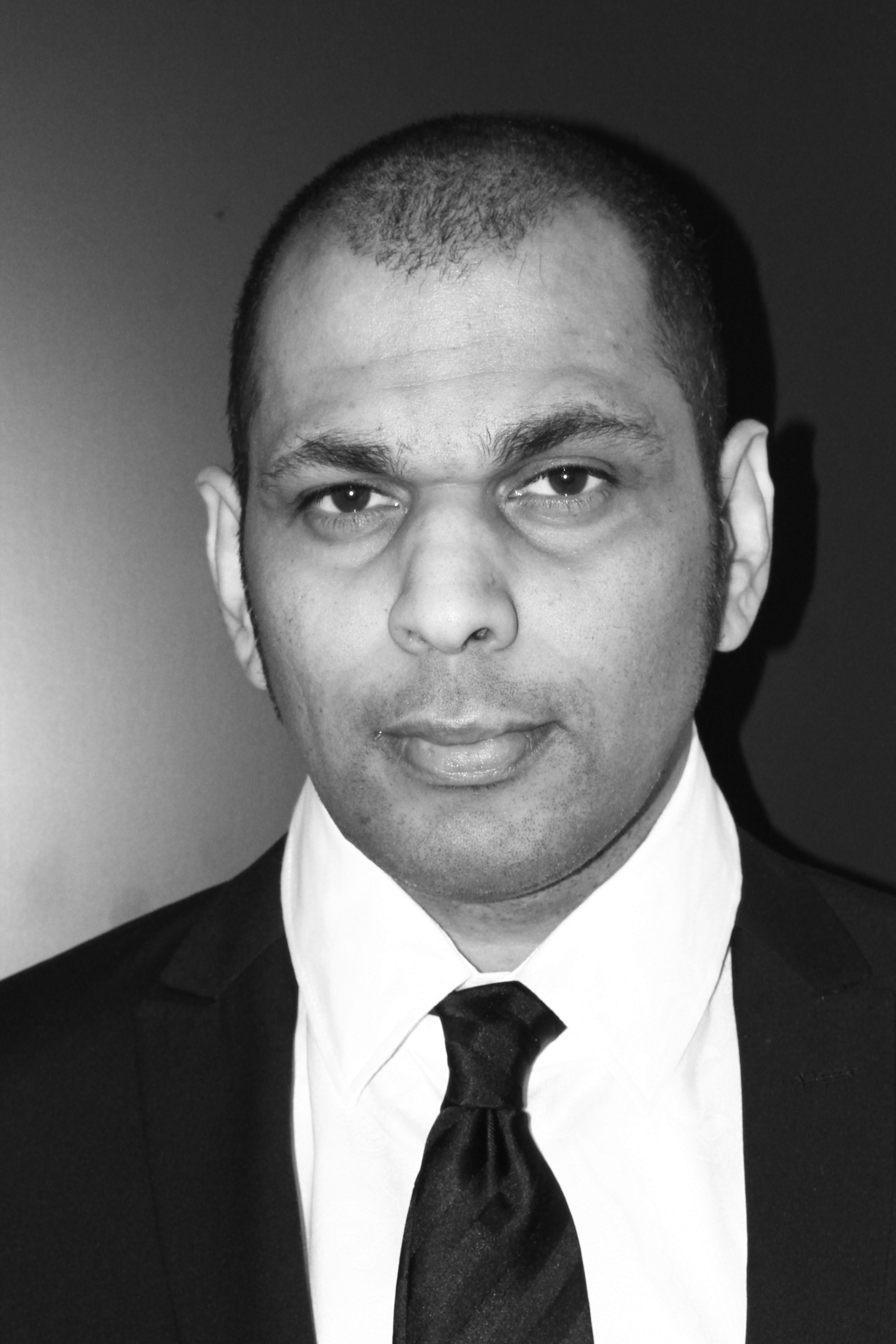
- Born: Vinod Konaril Bharathan; 20 September 1969 (age 56); Kochi, Kerala, India
- Occupations: Film director, screenwriter, producer, cinematography, editing
- Years active: 2009–present
- Notable work: Karma Cartel
- Spouse: Anette Ravn Jensen

Vinod Bharathan is an Indian filmmaker based in Copenhagen.

== Career ==
Originally from Kochi, he moved to Copenhagen in 2000. He worked in logistics for eight years and enrolled himself to a film school. Lars Von Trier was his mentor and he was inspired by the Dogme 95 movement. He started FookDat, a group that makes short films for free to add to their portfolio.

His most notable short film was Limbo, which he shot using an iPhone. Karma Cartel was his debut feature film and was shot on HDV.

== Selected filmography ==
Year	Title	Notes	Ref.
2010	The Suspect	Official Selection - Google+ Unofficial Film Festival	
2011	Karma Code	Official Selection - Ahmedabad International Film Festival; Official Selection - Show Me Justice, Texas, U.S.A.	
2011	Limbo	Best Film Shot on a mobile device - Circuitto Off/ Sony Userfarm, Venice, Italy; Best Film - Indiefone Film Festival, U.S.A.	
2012	The Punishment		
2013	Karma Currency	Screened as a part of the Short Film Corner at the Cannes Film Festival	
2015	Karma Cartel	Award Of Excellence - Canada International Film Festival 2014	
2017	Godzone		
