= Femina George =

Indian model (born 1997)

- Born: October 26, 1997 (age 29); Saudi Arabia
- Education: Rajagiri College of Management and Applied Sciences
- Occupation: Actress
- Years active: 2021–present
- Notable work: Minnal Murali
- Partner: Kevin Kuriakose

Femina George is an Indian actress, who works predominantly in Malayalam films. She made her feature film debut in the 2021 Netflix superhero film Minnal Murali.

== Career ==
George graduated from Rajagiri College of Management and Applied Sciences, Kakkanad.

She began her career with Basil Joseph’s film Minnal Murali (2021), in which she played the role of "Bruce Lee" Biji. Her performance drew attention for portraying a karate-practicing travel agent who helps the protagonist.

Following her debut, she appeared in several Malayalam films, including Theeppori Benny (2023) and Sesham Mike-il Fathima (2023).

== Filmography ==
Year	Title	Role	Notes
2021	Minnal Murali	"Bruce Lee" Biji	Nominated – SIIMA Award for Best Debutant Actress (Malayalam)
2023	Theeppori Benny	Ponnila	
2023	Sesham Mike-il Fathima	Ramya Aavani	
2026	Karakkam	Pinki	
2026	Orijinal		
2026	Disco	Manna	
2026	Haiku	Nivetha "Nivi"	Tamil film
