= Anjaam Pathiraa =

2020 film by Midhun Manuel Thomas

- Theatrical release poster
- Directed by: Midhun Manuel Thomas
- Written by: Midhun Manuel Thomas
- Produced by: Ashiq Usman
- Starring: Kunchacko Boban; Sreenath Bhasi; Sharaf U Dheen
- Cinematography: Shyju Khalid
- Edited by: Saiju Sreedharan
- Music by: Sushin Shyam
- Production companies: Ashiq Usman Productions; Manual Movie Makers
- Distributed by: Central Pictures
- Release date: 10 January 2020 (India)
- Running time: 144 minutes
- Country: India
- Language: Malayalam
- Box office: est. ₹50 crore

Anjaam Pathiraa (transl. The Fifth Midnight) (promoted as Midnight Murders outside Kerala and internationally) is a 2020 Indian Malayalam-language crime thriller film written and directed by Midhun Manuel Thomas. The film stars Kunchacko Boban, Sharaf U Dheen, Sreenath Bhasi, Unnimaya Prasad, Jinu Joseph and Abhiram Radhakrishnan.Sushin Shyam composed the music, while Shyju Khalid was the cinematographer.

Anjaam Pathiraa was dubbed in Telugu and Hindi as Midnight Murders and Police Story and was released on Aha and Goldmines Telefilms. The film received positive reviews from critics and became the highest-grossing Malayalam film of 2020. Following the film's success, Midhun Manuel Thomas has announced a sequel titled Aaaram Pathiraa (transl. The sixth midnight).

Parts of the plot were based on real events: such as the Psycho Simon character was taken from the 2017 Nanthancode massacre where a psychopathic son killed his entire family; and Ripper Ravi character is based on Ripper Chandran, a notorious serial killer in Kerala during late 1980s.

== Plot ==
Anwar Hussain is a psychologist who works as a consulting criminologist in Kochi City Police on the special recommendation of his friend ACP Anil Madhavan. One night, DYSP Abraham Koshy is abducted and killed, and his corpse is left in a gypsum field with his eyes and heart eviscerated. The investigation is headed by DCP Catherine. The autopsy report shows medication in the body, but no signs of a struggle. In a few days, a second police officer goes missing. His body is found in the backyard of the police station, along with a Lady Justice figurine.

Anwar finds a similar artefact in the previous crime scene from the forensic photos, with matching autopsy results. The station's CCTV footage was tampered, indicating the killer is also a security hacker. Anwar employs hacker Andrew to investigate. Catherine plans to lure the killer by having two officers patrol the night at 100-meter distance. On duty, Catherine's driver Paulson is kidnapped and his scooter's camera footage shows a wolf-masked man and another man's voice, indicating they work as a team. Paulson's body is delivered to Anwar's house in a refrigerator box.

The fingerprint of a cocaine dealer named Shameer Abdulla is found. They track him to a cottage where they find his mummified corpse; it was a decoy. Anwar accidentally discovers a signature imprinted on the figurine, which turns out to be that of its sculptor, Sudhakar Devalokam. On questioning, Sudhakar explains that he made five such figurines for two men, who blinded him after. From that, Anwar deduces there will be two more murders. On another day, CI Sharathchandran is abducted after a struggle at his home, where in addition to the figurine, they also find a fidget spinner. His body is dropped in a Kochi Metro train by a woman. Catherine is replaced with ACP Prakash Seetharam.

Sharathchandran had regularly taken a prescription drug named Tenormin. Anwar theorises that the killers inject hypnotic drugs in the victim's body to hypnotize them into following; Tenormin counters this, making Sharathchandran's hypnosis unsuccessful, hence the struggle. Anwar recalls seeing a photo of a similar spinner in the police file for a homicidal psychopath and hacker named Simon. While Simon is recorded dead during an explosion in prison, Anwar is not convinced. Andrew recognises Simon as the one who cross-dressed as the woman on the train.

Anwar reports his findings but is informed that Simon and his crime partner Aravindan's bodies were found that morning with a suicide note confessing to the murders left along with the last figurine. Anwar is unconvinced and believes it is a decoy. Anwar is called by Sudhakar after a man comes to his workshop for a sixth figurine which he made for his personal satisfaction. He has made a painting based on his daughter's description. Anwar identifies him as psychologist Dr. Benjamin Louis, since he always recommends his psychology books to colleges. From Benjamin's foster parent Sudhevan, Anwar learns that when Benjamin was a teenager, his sister Rebecca was impregnated by a priest named Bennet Franko.

When their father reported the crime, SI Anil and Constable Sharathchandran framed him for assaulting his daughter after taking a bribe from Father Bennet. Rebecca was placed in a distant convent, and their father committed suicide in prison. Later, Benjamin went to the United States for higher studies and came back. Anwar deduces that the first three murders were random and the actual targets are Sharathchandran and Anil. He goes to warn Anil but only finds his deserted car. From a nearby quadcopter, Anwar finds footage of Benjamin's van, which Andrew traces to a pig farm.

Anwar and two officers intercept Benjamin before he can kill Anil. Benjamin knocks them down and chokes Anwar, but is saved by Catherine. Benjamin is arrested. On questioning, Benjamin does not disclose his motive. Anwar deduces that the burnt corpse misidentified in prison as Simon's was actually Bennet's. While in transit for presenting him in court, his escort officers kills Benjamin in a fake encounter. At the same time, a girl visits Anil at his apartment. Anwar enters when she leaves and finds Anil dead. He realises that the girl killed him. Through the window, Anwar calls her Rebecca, to which she turns back, looks at him and leaves.

== Cast ==
- Kunchacko Boban as Dr. Anwar Hussain, a criminologist
- Sharaf U Dheen as Dr. Benjamin Louis
  - Mathew Thomas as Young Benjamin Louis
- Sreenath Bhasi as Andrew, a hacker
- Jinu Joseph as ACP Anil Madhavan IPS
- Unnimaya Prasad as DCP Catherine Maria IPS
- Abhiram Radhakrishnan as SI Pradeep Raman
- Harikrishnan as SI Arun Mathew
- Nikhila Vimal as Rebecca Louis, Benjamin's sister (cameo appearance)
  - Nandhana Varma as Young Rebecca Louis
- Divya Gopinath as SI Preethi Poduval
- Indrans as Ripper Ravi, a serial killer on death row
- Remya Nambeesan as Fathima, Anwar's wife
- Arjun Nandhakumar as ACP Prakash Seetharam IPS
- Arun Cherukavil as Father Bennett Franco
- Jaffar Idukki as Louis, Benjamin and Rebecca's father
- Jaise Jose as CI Sharath Chandran
- Assim Jamal as Police Commissioner Hashim
- Gilu Joseph as Doctor
- Sadiq as Dr. Sreekanth
- Sudheesh as Sudevan
- Shaju Sreedhar as CPO Paulson
- Boban Samuel as DYSP Abraham Koshy
- Dileesh Nair as Shameer Abdullah aka Cocaine Shameer
- Priyanandanan as Sudhkar Devalokam
- Ranjini George as Collector
- Nazreen Nazar as Mythilli Sudhakar
- Sudeer Sufi as Simon Manjooran aka Psycho Simon
- Rajan Poothrakkal as Aravindan Kartha aka Psycho Aravind
- Amina Nijam as Vicky Maria
- Vineeth Vasudevan as Police officer

== Production ==
On 24 June 2019, it was reported that Kunchacko Boban would star in Midhun Manuel Thomas' next directorial and filming was said to begin by late July. Sharaf U Dheen, Unnimaya Prasad, Sreenath Bhasi, Jinu Joseph, Jaffar Idukki and Assim Jamal were also confirmed in the cast, and Sushin Shyam and Shyju Khalid will be the composer and cinematographer, respectively. Midhun said that the film is entirely different from his previous films. The film was formally launched with a pooja ceremony on 17 July 2019. Principal photography began on 1 August 2019, also revealing the title.

== Music ==
The film score was composed, programmed, and arranged by Sushin Shyam.

Anjaam Pathiraa

Soundtrack album by Sushin Shyam
- Released: 9 April 2020
- Genre: Feature film soundtrack
- Length: 27:43
- Label: Muzik 247
- Producer: Sushin Shyam

Sushin Shyam chronology
Virus (2019)	Anjaam Pathiraa (2020)	Kappela (2020)
External audio
- Audio Jukebox on YouTube

Anjaam Pathiraa (Original Motion Picture Soundtrack)
No.	Title	Length
1.	"Anwar Hussain - The Psychologist"	1:13
2.	"Manic Pleasure"	1:17
3.	"Sleepless Nights"	0:05
4.	"Pray"	0:44
5.	"The Hunt"	0:49
6.	"Anjaam Pathiraa Title"	2:59
7.	"Alarming"	1:05
8.	"Spree"	2:11
9.	"Plotting for Next Kill"	1:39
10.	"Fidget Spinner"	1:21
11.	"Dr. Benjamin Louis"	2:55
12.	"Story of Dr. Benjamin Louis"	4:49
13.	"Justice Served"	6:26

== Release ==
=== Theatrical ===
The film was released on 10 January 2020. The film was passed with 'U/A' certificate from Central Board of Film Certification.

=== Home media ===
The film was premiered on 10 April 2020 in Surya TV

== Reception ==
=== Critical response ===
Sajin Shrijith of The New Indian Express rated 4 out of 5 and called it "an efficient, well-crafted mystery" and said that it is "director Midhun Manuel Thomas' best work so far." Litty Simon of Malayala Manorama rated 3.5 out of 5 stars calling it "a crafty thriller from Kunchacko & Co." and "Anjaam Pathiraa will definitely make you restless. It is an excellent theatrical experience. In the film which villain is so complicated and line is multilayered from usual genre which thrills you always." Deepa Soman of The Times of India awarded 3 out of 5 and wrote that it was "a decently engaging crime thriller." and appreciated Kunchacko Boban's performance stating that he "gives the right demeanour to Anwar Hussain, as do the rest of the cast." Writing for The News Minute, Cris called it "a neatly-packed thriller" and added that "the film moves fast, not wasting time on a song or even a line too many, with noticeable performances and negligible flaws." Baradwaj Rangan of Film Companion South wrote "In the end, Anjaam Pathiraa turns out to be one of those films that takes a hot-button issue and expects us to care simply because it takes that issue up. The drama is undernourished, the thrills are feeble".

=== Box office ===
The film was both commercial and critical success. In the overseas opening weekend, the film grossed US$713,243 from 78 screens in the United Arab Emirates (the best opening of that weekend), US$48,487 (₹34.48 lakh) from 30 screens in the United States, US$6,081 (₹4.33 lakh) from 2 screens in Canada, and A$28,605 (₹13.89 lakh) from 3 screens in Australia. It earned US$19,857 (₹14.2 lakh) in Canada in two weeks, £28,714 (₹26.78 lakh) in the United Kingdom in three weeks, A$85,285 (₹40.98 lakh) in Australia in four weeks, and US$116,759 (₹83.36 lakh) in the US in five weeks. It is the highest grossing Malayalam film of 2020 which collected over ₹50 crore from Worldwide box office

== Real life influence ==
Vishnupriya, 23 year-old pharmacist at a private hospital in Panur, was murdered at her house on 22 October 2022 by Shyamjith. During trial, he confessed that murder was inspired from the film.

== Sequel ==
A sequel titled Aaram Pathiraa was announced by Midhun Manuel Thomas on 10 January 2021.
