= C. R. Omanakuttan =

Indian writer and humorist (1943–2023)

- Born: 13 February 1943: Kottayam, Kingdom of Travancore, British India; (present day Kerala, India)
- Died: 16 September 2023 (aged 80); Kochi, Ernakulam, Kerala, India
- Education: CMS College, Kottayam; St. Berchmans College, Changanassery; Sree Narayana College, Kollam
- Occupations: Educator; Writer; Orator
- Notable work: Shavam Theenikal; Nee Sathyam Njanam Anandam; Sree Bhoothanatha Vilasam Nair Hotel; Omanakathakal; Pakarnnattam
- Spouse: S. Hemalatha
- Children: 2 (incl. Amal Neerad)
- Relatives: Jyothirmayi (daughter-in-law)

C. R. Omanakkuttan (13 February 1943 – 16 September 2023) was an Indian writer, humorist and cultural activist from the state of Kerala. He was awarded the 2010 Kerala Sahitya Akademi Award for Humour for his book Sree Bhoothanatha Vilasam Nair Hotel.

== Life and career ==
C. R. Omanakkuttan was born in Kottayam on 13 February 1943, to Pennamma and Raghavan.

Omanakuttan completed his studies from CMS College, Kottayam, Sree Narayana College, Kollam, and St. Berchmans College, Changanassery. He worked as an information officer in the Public Relations Department for four years before shifting his career to teaching.

Omanakuttan was also a member of the Sahithya Pravarthaka Sahakarana Sangham, advisory committee for Kerala State Cultural Affairs Department, State Film Awards Committee, State Film Development Corporation director board, Mahatma Gandhi University Curriculum Revision Committee and Vishwa Vijnana Kosham editorial board.

Malayalam filmmaker Amal Neerad is his son and actress Jyothirmayi is his daughter-in-law. S Hemalatha is his wife. He also has a daughter, Anoopa C. R., who teaches at Maharaja's College. Scriptwriter and theatre artist Gopan Chidambaram is his son-in-law.

A native of Thirunakkara in Kottayam, Omanakuttan had served as a professor of Malayalam in different government colleges in Kerala. He worked at the Maharaja's College, Ernakulam, for 23 years.

Omanakuttan authored nearly 20 books, including translations.

Among his notable works are Nee Sathyam Njanam Anandam, Omanakkathakal and Pakarnnattam. He had won the Kerala Sahitya Akademi Award for his book Sree Bhoothanatha Vilasam Nair Hotel in 2010. Two of his books, Shavam Theenikal and Thiranjedutha Kathakal were released in Kochi earlier this month. Shavamtheenikal is a record of the struggles people had to endure during The Emergency (1975–1977). The book contains his memories of travelling with Professor Eachara Warrier while he was investigating the murder of his son Rajan during the Emergency.

C. R. Omanakuttan died of a haemorrhage a private hospital in Kochi, on 16 September 2023, at the age of 80. His cremation was held at Ravipuram crematorium the following day.
