= Shamla Hamza =

Indian actress

- Born: Palakkad, Kerala, India
- Occupation: Actress
- Children: 1

Shamla Hamza is an Indian actress recognized for her role in Feminichi Fathima, which won her the 2025 Kerala State Film Award for Best Actress. She made her acting debut in the 2022 Malayalam drama film 1001 Nunakal.

== Accolades ==
Year	Award	Category	Recipient	Result	Notes	Ref.
2025	55th Kerala State Film Awards	Best Actress	Feminichi Fathima	Won		

== Filmography ==
Year	Title	Role	Notes	Ref.
2022	1001 Nunakal	Salma	Debut	
2025	Feminichi Fathima	Fathima	Won – Kerala State Film Awards for Best Actress	
