= Bachelor Party D'eux =

2026 Indian Malayalam-language film

- Directed by: Amal Neerad
- Written by: Amal Neerad; Sambhunath(additional screenplay)Unni R (dialogues); R J Murugan (additional dialogues)
- Produced by: Anwar Rasheed; Nazriya Nazim; Jyothirmayi
- Starring: Naslen; Kunchacko Boban; Soubin Shahir; Sreenath Bhasi; Sharaf U Dheen; Chandu Salim Kumar
- Cinematography: Appu Prabhakar
- Edited by: Vivek Harshan
- Music by: Christo Xavier
- Production companies: Amal Neerad Productions; Anwar Rasheed Entertainments; Fahadh Faasil and Friends
- Release date: 19 November 2026
- Running time: 132 minutes
- Country: India
- Language: Malayalam

Bachelor Party D'eux is a 2026 Indian Malayalam-language action crime drama film written and directed by Amal Neerad. A spiritual sequel of Neerad's 2012 film Bachelor Party, the film stars Naslen, Kunchacko Boban, Soubin Shahir, Sreenath Bhasi, Sharaf U Dheen and Chandu Salim Kumar in the lead roles along with Shine Tom Chacko, Nadhiya Moidu, Rajisha Vijayan, Jyothirmayi, Hansika Krishna, Paris Laxmi and Lal in supporting roles. Tovino Thomas makes an extended cameo appearance in the film.

The film was produced by Amal Neerad under Amal Neerad Productions, in association with Anwar Rasheed Entertainment and Fahadh Faasil and Friends. It was released in theatres on 19 November 2026. The film received negative reviews from critics.

== Plot ==
The film follows a group of five friends, known as the Orphanage Mafia, whose relationships and loyalty are tested by conflicts involving the criminal underworld. As unexpected circumstances bring them together, they face dangerous situations and confront a common enemy.

== Cast ==
- Naslen as Sony
- Kunchacko Boban as Dheeraj Prabhu
- Soubin Shahir as Danny
- Sreenath Bhasi as Xavier a.k.a. Xavi
- Sharaf U Dheen as Pappan
- Chandu Salim Kumar as Mammu
- Shine Tom Chacko as Guru
- Nadhiya as Anna Mathews
- Rajisha Vijayan as Simple
- Jyothirmayi as Paulie Abdullah
- Hansika Krishna as Carol Abdullah
- Paris Laxmi as Nalini
- Lal as Noah/Avarachan, a gunsmith
- Sajin Gopu as Vasu
- Arun Kurian as Manu Mathews (Cameo Appearance)
- Tovino Thomas as Musthafa (Cameo Appearance)

== Production ==
=== Development ===
In January 2026, director Amal Neerad announced a spiritual sequel to Bachelor Party, titled Bachelor Party D'eux. The announcement was made through a poster reveal shared on social media platforms.

In September 2026, Amal Neerad released the first look poster.

=== Crew ===
Amal Neerad directed and wrote the film, with additional writing by Sambhunath, dialogues by Unni R and additional dialogues by R J Murugan Appu Prabhakar handled the cinematography, while Vivek Harshan was responsible for editing. Christo Xavier composed the music.

The film was produced by Amal Neerad Productions, Anwar Rasheed Entertainment and Fahadh Faasil and Friends.

== Music ==
The film's soundtrack and original score were composed by Christo Xavier. The soundtrack includes singles such as "Shishiramo", "Chinthamooka", "Chirakukale" and "Vaazhve Maayam".

The full soundtrack album was released by Sony Music South on 16 November 2026.

== Release ==
Bachelor Party D'eux was released theatrically worldwide on 19 November 2026. The film is certified as "A" (Adults only) by CBFC.

== Reception ==
=== Critical response ===
The film received mixed reviews from critics upon its release.

S R Praveen of The Hindu wrote: "Amal Neerad makes a sequel almost as forgettable as the original"

Anandu Suresh of The Indian Express rated the film 1.5 out of 5, describing it as a lifeless imitation of the original and criticising its writing, performances and lack of emotional depth.

Cinema Express gave the film 2 out of 5, criticising its screenplay and its attempt to recreate the style of the original film.

Latha Srinivasan of NDTV rated the film 2.5 out of 5, noting that its premise had potential but that the screenplay was disappointing.

Princy Alexander of Onmanorama wrote:"Amal Neerad's sequel captures spirit of original, but not quite same magic".

Sajin Shrijith of The Week gave a mixed review stating "Amal Neerad's film is an upgrade and a downgrade at the same time".

Sanjay Ponnappa of India Today criticised the film's screenplay and described it as an exercise in style without substance.

The Hollywood Reporter India reviewed as "Bachelor Party D’eux' feels less like a sequel than a filmmaker caught in an elaborate Mexican standoff with his own myth".

== See also ==
- Bachelor Party (2012 film)
- List of Malayalam films of 2026
