= Amal Neerad =

Indian film director, cinematographer and producer (born 1976)

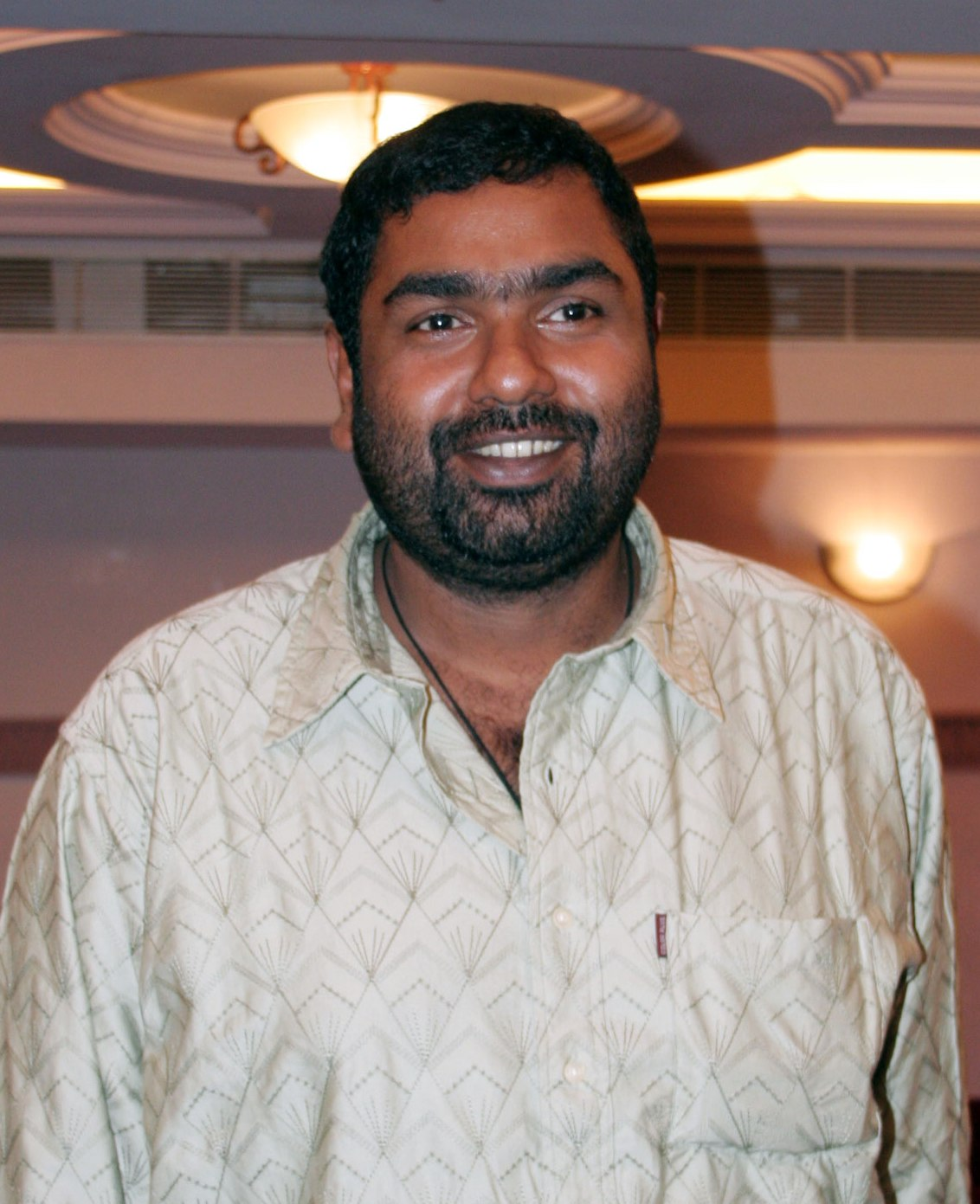
- Amal in 2009
- Born: 13 February 1978 (age 48); Kollam, Kerala, India
- Education: Maharaja's College, Ernakulam Kedge Business School; Satyajit Ray Film and Television Institute
- Occupations: Cinematographer; film director; film producer; screenwriter
- Years active: 2004–present
- Organization: Amal Neerad Productions
- Spouse: Jyothirmayi (m. 2015)
- Parents: C. R. Omanakuttan; S. Hemalatha

Amal Neerad ISC (born 13 February 1978) is an Indian film director, cinematographer and producer who mainly works in Malayalam cinema. He attended the Satyajit Ray Film and Television Institute, Kolkata (first batch). He was awarded the National Film Award for Best Cinematography (special mention) in 2001 for his diploma film Meena Jha (short feature section).

He started his career shooting music videos, documentaries and advertising. It was his diploma film that brought him to the attention of Ram Gopal Varma and his team. Amal Neerad moved into Hindi cinema with three back to back films; James (2005), Darna Zaroori Hai (2006) and Shiva (2006). In 2004, he also shot the Malayalam film Black starring Mammootty.

== Early and personal life ==
Amal Neerad was born in Kollam, Kerala. He attended school and college in Kochi. He was the college union chairman of Maharaja's College, Ernakulam during two consecutive terms, 1992–93 and 1993–94. He married actress Jyothirmayi on 4 April 2015.

== Career ==
Amal joined the Satyajit Ray Film and Television Institute in 1995.After his graduation from the institute, he debuted in Malayalam cinema as an independent cinematographer with Black (2004), directed by Ranjith. Afterwards, he relocated to Mumbai and worked as the cinematographer in the productions of Ram Gopal Varma: James (2005), Darna Zaroori Hai (2006), and Shiva (2006).

In 2007, he made his directorial debut with Big B starring Mammootty and Shereveer Vakil. Even though the movie was an average grosser at the box office, the stylish narrative and technical brilliance that the film possessed apparently gave the movie an iconic stature and cult following. His next film was Sagar Alias Jacky starring Mohanlal, a sequel to the 1987 film Irupatham Noottandu. In 2010, he directed Anwar with Prithviraj in the lead role.

Amal Neerad launched his production company Amal Neerad Productions through the 2012 film Bachelor Party directed by himself. In 2013, he produced the anthology film, 5 Sundarikal. Amal directed the segment Kullante Bharya which starred Dulquer Salmaan and handled camera for the segment Aami, directed by Anwar Rasheed. He directed and co-produced (with Fahad Faasil) the period thriller Iyobinte Pustakam starring Fahadh Faasil, Lal, and Jayasurya in 2014. In 2017, he produced and directed Comrade in America starring Dulquer Salmaan. He later directed Fahadh Faasil starred Varathan in 2018. The movie was jointly produced by Neerad and Fahadh Faasil. Amal joined hands with Anwar Rasheed again as a cinematographer for the movie Trance, starring Fahadh Faasil. Later, he joined Mammootty again after 15 years for the movie Bheeshma Parvam which emerged as one of the biggest hits in Mollywood industry.

== Controversies ==
On September 2024, In a post on the Kerala Catholic Bishops' Council's Jagratha Commission Facebook page, it was claimed that his blockbuster, Bheeshma Parvam (2022), offended Christian sentiments. The KCBC Jagratha Commission alleged that the portrayal of drug use, homosexuality, alcohol, and adultery among key Christian characters in the film was a deliberate attempt to depict them negatively.

A formal complaint in 2024 was filed against the song, "Sthuthi", from Bougainvillea (2024). The complaint stated that the song offended religious sentiments by misusing sacred Christian hymns. According to the complainants, the combination of a devotional hymn with modern music is seen as disrespectful and offensive to religious beliefs.

== Filmography ==
Year	Title	Director	Cinematographer	Producer	Notes
2004	Black	No	Yes	No	
2005	James	No	Yes	No	Hindi film
2006	Shiva	No	Yes	No	Hindi film
2006	Darna Zaroori Hai	No	Yes	No	Hindi film
2007	Big B	Yes	No	No	Director debut
2009	Sagar Alias Jacky Reloaded	Yes	Yes	No	
2010	Anwar	Yes	No	No	
2010	Tournament	No	Yes	No	A song only (Nila Nila).
2012	Bachelor Party	Yes	Yes	Yes	
2013	5 Sundarikal	Yes	Yes	Yes	Anthology film. Director of "Kullante Bharya". Cinematographer of "Aami"
2014	Iyobinte Pusthakam	Yes	Yes	Yes	Winner: Kerala state film award for best cinematography
2017	Comrade in America	Yes	No	Yes	
2018	Varathan	Yes	No	Yes	Co-produced with Nazriya Nazim
2020	Trance	No	Yes	No	
2022	Bheeshma Parvam	Yes	No	Yes	Also co-writer
2024	Bougainvillea	Yes	No	Yes	Also co-writer
2026	Bachelor Party D'eux	Yes	No	Yes	

== Awards and recognitions ==
2014 Kerala State Film Awards

- Best Cinematography: Amal Neerad

2014, Asianet Film Awards.

- His film Iyobinte Pustakam bagged best film in 2014 at Asianet Film Awards.

2024, 55th Kerala State Film Awards

- Kerala State Film Award for Best Screenplay (Adapted)

- Award Shared with Lajo Jose
