= Karma Cartel =

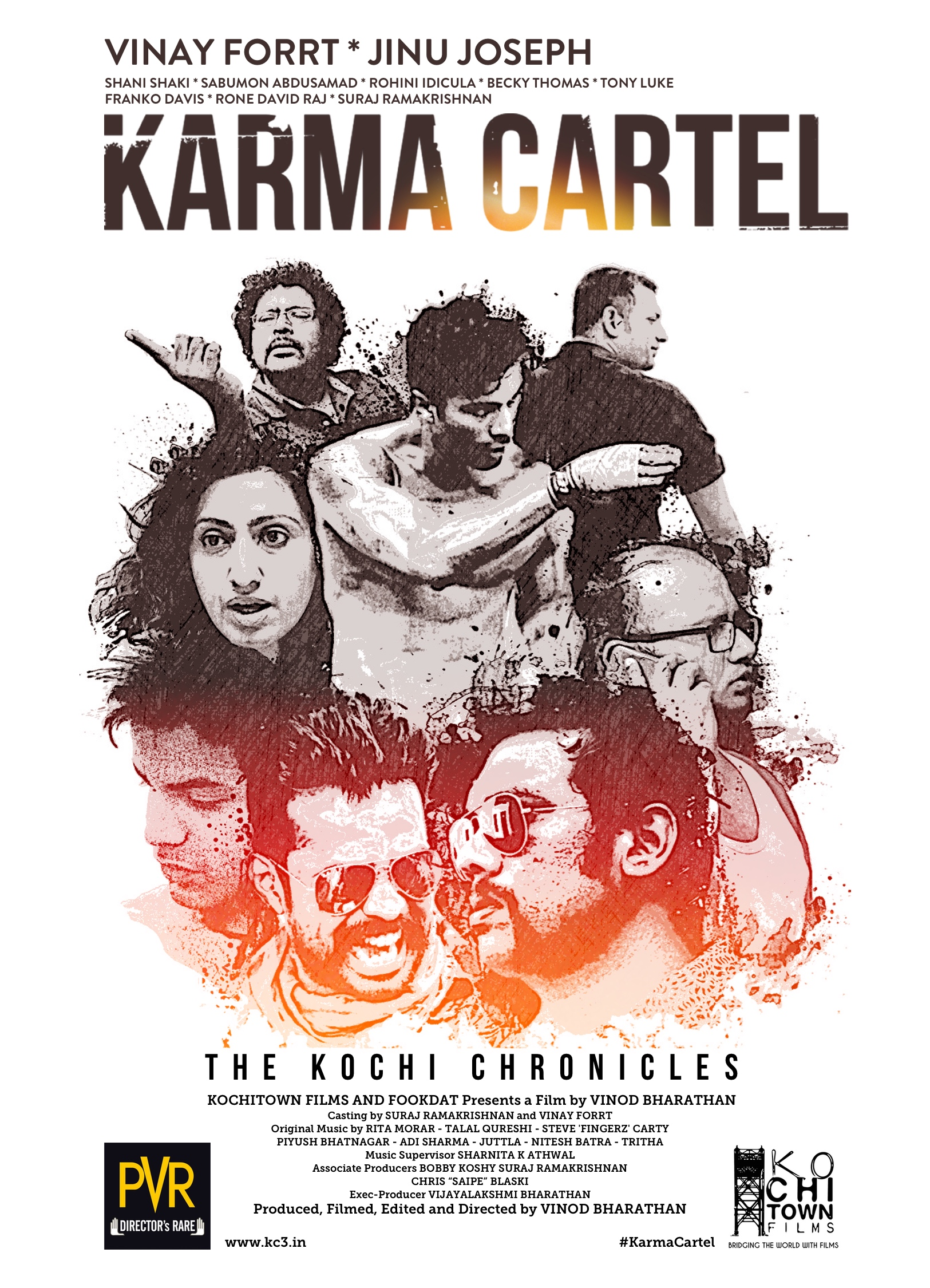
- Poster
- Directed by: Vinod Bharathan
- Produced by: Vinod Bharathan
- Starring: Vinay Forrt; Jinu Joseph
- Cinematography: Vinod Bharathan
- Edited by: Vinod Bharathan
- Production companies: Fookdat Productions; KochiTown Films
- Release dates: 2011 (International Film Festival Ahmedabad); 7 August 2015 (Indian)
- Running time: 105 minutes
- Country: India
- Languages: Malayalam; English

Karma Cartel is a 2011 Malayalam-language film produced and directed by Vinod Bharathan. The film stars Vinay Forrt and Jinu Joseph.

The film is a modern day look at India's growing economy and fast cash culture that the modern Indian youth are enticed by. Told through the actions of six people living different lives, the plot is interconnected through a single thread – easy money. The film follows a struggling actor and his foolish friend, who bring them into trouble, exposing an array of others who are also linked by the incident.

== Plot ==
Sidth who is an upcoming actor, is best friends with Richie, who is constantly on the lookout for business opportunities. Sidth tries his luck at film sets and casting's and is frustrated at the negative feedback. Sidth's meeting with an indie film director fuels his hopes for his career. Richie, who meets an old friend of his, gets an idea to make some easy money. He invests in a ponzi scheme without Sidth knowing about it in detail. Sidth attends a casting for a big film producer, who in turns wants Sidth to give him sexual service in exchange for the role.

Dr Roy is a medical practitioner, who is also addicted to the real estate business. The addiction leads to debts and deadlines for payments begin interfering in his work. He has to pay Franko, a money-lending thug, 5,000 by the weekend. He contacts Deejay to make some money out of a rushed deal. He also invests in a fast cash scheme as second option, the same where Richie had invested.

Q, the Indie film director who needs money for his production, goes to meet Franko under Deejays recommendation. Sidth tags along as the lead actor of the film. While meeting Franko, Sidth sees Shaji, a money collector and learns that he always has a stack of cash in his sling bag.

Arjun and Tina have been dating for a while. Arjun, who is busy with his "business", is still a mystery to Tina. Tina is a divorcee who thinks that she has her life totally in control. Arjun surprises her by proposing to her and without her knowing, she falls in too deep for Arjun.

Tony is an Indian living abroad. He had been involved in a business with someone in India while he was abroad. His partner in India cheats him, and Tony now wants to teach him a lesson. Tony contacts Luttu and Plan B, two bounty hunters who use threats before harm to their victims. Luttu and Plan B are film enthusiasts who live and behave like film stars.

Luttu and Plan B tracks Tony's Indian business partner and discovers that he is also known as Arjun, Tina's fiancée. They discover that Arjun had transferred all the money to U.S.A. Luttu takes Arjun's phone to track down all who Arjun has dealings with. Luttu gives the bad news to Richie and Dr Roy, meanwhile Plan B finds a receipt of a diamond ring in Arjun's room. They decide to fetch it as their pay for the job. They beat Arjun badly and put him in the boot of at the car and head towards the cafe that he was supposed to meet Tina. Luttu now tells Tina the true side of Arjun, and she is in a state of disbelief. She asks for proof and Luttu asks her to check the boot of his car. Tina sees Arjun and realizes that Luttu was right. She is angry at first, but as the car drives away, she realises that she had let her fences down Arjun had gone in too deep into her heart. She is heartbroken.

Richie, who had taken money from his parents to make the quick buck, is now panicking about the loss of it all. He tells Sidth about it. As they panic, Sidth sees Franko's collector Shaji walking past them. Sidth mentions that Shaji must have at least 60,000 in his bag, and hopes Shaji forgets his bag somewhere so Richie can get the money. Richie follows Shaji to a lane where he snatches the bag and runs. Richie runs straight to Sidth, and finds that there is not much money in the bag, as Dr Roy who had to pay Franko, has delayed his payments again. Shaji tracks Richie and sees him standing beside Sidth who he recognizes from Franko's place during the meeting with indie director.

Franko, who is angry that Sidth and his friend tried to overpower Shaji, calls Deejay and tells him that he is going to teach them a lesson. Franko decides to shake all the late payers, including Dr Roy.

Deejay calls Sidth to find out what went wrong. Sidth explains, and Deejay tells them to leave the city if they want to stay alive. Sidth and Richie decide to take the next train to Mumbai.

Dr Roy gets fired from his job, as the hospital has had enough of his distractions at work. Dr Roy who has lost his job, and has no successful real estate deals, now faces Franko's thugs who take his car away.

While waiting for the train, Richie comes with one last crazy idea to sell their motorbike before they leave to Mumbai. Sidth calls him a fool, but gets a better idea. He borrows the bike and rides to the hotel where a film producer offered to cast him earlier. He lashes all his anger out on the producer by beating him up and steals all his money. He reaches the train station just in time as the train they have bought tickets to was leaving the station. They both run and hop on the speeding train. They leave to Mumbai, smiling.

== Cast ==
- Vinay Forrt as Sidth
- Dr Rony David as Dr Roy
- Tony Luke as Tony
- Jinu Joseph as Q
- Arjun Chemparathy as Arjun
- Shani Shaki as Plan B
- Rohini Miriam Idicula as the reporter
- Becky Thomas as Tina Roy
- Ahamed Shaheen as Richie
- Assistant Commissioner of Police
- Troju Jacob as Head Surgeon
- Madan Babu as Film Producer
- Sabumon Abdusamad as Luttu
- Franko Davis Manjilla as Franko Ex-Gangster
- Lukmance as Casting Agent
- Suraj Ramakrishan as Deejay the fixer
- Roopesh K.V. as Dr Rupesh

== Production ==
Karma Cartel is the last film in the Karma trilogy and is a sequel to Karma Code and Karma Currency. It was mostly shot at Fort Kochi. The post-production work took place in Copenhagen.

== Festival screenings ==
Karma Cartel premiered at the 2011 International Film Festival Ahmedabad, and also showed at Cochin Film Society at Kochi and later traveled to film festivals in Canada, America and Italy, where it won Award of Excellence in filmmaking at Canada International Film Festival 2014, and Best First Time Director Award at American Movie Awards, Nevada, 2014. The Director Vinod Bharathan won the Best Director Award at the CinemaVvenire Film Festival, Rome 2014.
