= Kerala State Film Award for Best Actress =

Award presented annually by the Kerala State Chalachitra Academy

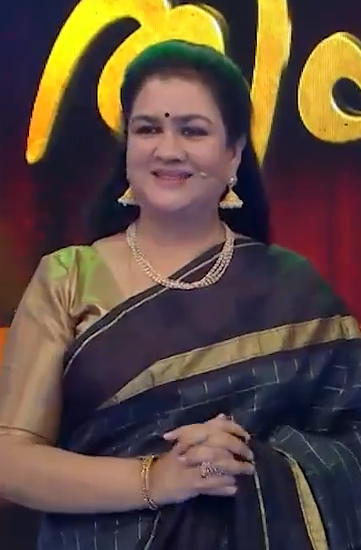
- Urvashi has received the award for a record six times
- Awarded for: Best performance by an actress in a Malayalam film
- Sponsored by: Kerala State Chalachitra Academy
- First award: 1969; 57 years ago
- Final award: 2024

Highlights
- Total awarded: 52
- First winner: Sheela
- Most Awards: Urvashi (6)
- Current Winner: Shamla Hamza
- Website: www.keralafilm.com

The Kerala State Film Award for Best Actress has been presented annually at the Kerala State Film Awards of India since 1969 to an actress for the best performance within the Malayalam film industry. Until 1997, the awards were managed directly by the Department of Cultural Affairs, Government of Kerala. Since 1998, the Kerala State Chalachitra Academy, an autonomous non-profit organisation functioning under the Department of Cultural Affairs, has been exercising control over the awards. The winners are selected by a jury formed by the academy, declared by the Minister for Cultural Affairs, and presented by the Chief Minister.

The 1st Kerala State Film Awards ceremony was held in 1970 with Sheela receiving the Best Actress award for her role in Kallichellamma (1969). The following year, Sharada was recognised for her performances in two films—Thriveni and Thara. Since then, several actresses have been awarded for more than one film during a year.

Throughout the years, accounting for ties and repeat winners, the government has presented a total of 54 Best Actress awards to 38 different actresses. Urvashi has been the most frequent winner, with six awards. She is followed by Sheela and Srividya with three awards each. As of 2023, nine actresses—Jayabharathi, Seema, Samyuktha Varma, Suhasini Maniratnam, Navya Nair, Meera Jasmine, Kavya Madhavan, Shweta Menon and Parvathy Thiruvothu have won the award two times. The 2005 ceremony was the only occasion when the category was tied; Kavya Madhavan and Geetu Mohandas shared the award for their performances in Perumazhakkalam, and Akale and Oridam respectively. The most recent recipient of the award is Shamla Hamza, for the film Feminichi Fathima in 2024.

== Winners ==
*	Indicates a joint award for that year

List of award recipients, showing the year and film(s)
Year	Image	Recipient(s)	Film(s)	Ref.
1969		Sheela	Kallichellamma	
1970		Sharada	Thriveni; Thara	
1971		Sheela	Oru Penninte Kadha; Sarasayya; Ummachu	
1972		Jayabharathi	Various films	
1973		Jayabharathi	Madhavikutty; Gayathri	
1974		Lakshmi	Chattakari	
1975		Rani Chandra	Swapnadanam	
1976		Sheela	Anubhavam	
1977		Santhakumari	Chuvanna Vithukal	
1978		Shoba	Ente Neelakaasham	
1979		Srividya	Edavazhiyile Poocha Minda Poocha; Jeevitham Oru Gaanam	
1980		Poornima Jayaram	Manjil Virinja Pookkal	
1981		Jalaja	Venal	
1982		Madhavi	Ormakkayi	
1983		Srividya	Rachana	
1984		Seema	Aksharangal; Aalkkoottathil Thaniye	
1985		Seema	Anubandham	
1986		Shari	Namukku Parkkan Munthiri Thoppukal	
1987		Suhasini	EzhuthappurangalManivathoorile Aayiram Sivarathrikal	
1988		Anju	Rugmini	
1989		Urvashi	Mazhavilkavadi; Varthamana Kalam	
1990		Urvashi	Thalayanamanthram	
1991		Urvashi	Kadinjool Kalyanam; Kakkathollayiram; Bharatham; Mukha Chithram	
1992		Srividya	Daivathinte Vikrithikal	
1993		Shobana	Manichitrathazhu	
1994		Shanthi Krishna	Chakoram	
1995		Urvashi	Kazhakam	
1996		Manju Warrier	Ee Puzhayum Kadannu	
1997		Jomol	Ennu Swantham Janakikutty	
1998		Sangita	Chinthavishtayaya Shyamala	
1999		Samyuktha Varma	Veendum Chila Veettukaryangal	
2000		Samyuktha Varma	Madhuranombarakattu; Mazha; Swayamvara Panthal	
2001		Suhasini	Theerthadanam	
2002	Navya nair	Navya Nair	Nandanam	
2003		Meera Jasmine	Kasthooriman; Paadam Onnu: Oru Vilapam	
2004 *		Kavya Madhavan	Perumazhakkalam	
2004 *		Geetu Mohandas	Akale; Oridam	
2005	Navya nair	Navya Nair	Saira; Kanne Madanguka	
2006		Urvashi	Madhuchandralekha	
2007		Meera Jasmine	Ore Kadal	
2008		Priyanka Nair	Vilapangalkappuram	
2009		Swetha Menon	Paleri Manikyam	
2010		Kavya Madhavan	Khaddama	
2011		Swetha Menon	Salt N' Pepper	
2012		Rima Kallingal	22 Female Kottayam; Nidra	
2013		Ann Augustine	Artist	
2014		Nazriya Nazim	Bangalore Days; Ohm Shanthi Oshaana	
2015		Parvathy Thiruvothu	Charlie; Ennu Ninte Moideen	
2016		Rajisha Vijayan	Anuraga Karikkin Vellam	
2017		Parvathy Thiruvothu	Take Off	
2018		Nimisha Sajayan	Oru Kuprasidha Payyan; Chola	
2019		Kani Kusruti	Biriyaani	
2020		Anna Ben	Kappela	
2021		Revathi	Bhoothakalam	
2022		Vincy Aloshious	Rekha	
2023 *		Urvashi	Ullozhukku	
2023 *		Beena R. Chandran	Thadavu	
2024		Shamla Hamza	Feminichi Fathima	

== See also ==
- National Film Award for Best Actress
- Filmfare Award for Best Actress – Malayalam
- Filmfare Critics Award for Best Actress – Malayalam
