= Azadi (2025 film) =

- Theatrical release poster
- Directed by: Jo George
- Written by: Sagar
- Screenplay by: Sagar
- Produced by: Faizal Raja
- Starring: Sreenath Bhasi; Vani Viswanath; Lal; Saiju Kurup; Raveena Ravi
- Cinematography: Saneesh Stanly
- Edited by: Noufal Abdulla
- Music by: Varun Unni
- Production company: Little Crew Production
- Distributed by: Central Pictures
- Release date: 23 May 2025
- Running time: 129 minutes
- Country: India
- Language: Malayalam

Azadi is a 2025 Indian Malayalam-language crime thriller film directed by debutant Jo George and written by Sagar. The film stars Sreenath Bhasi, Vani Viswanath, Lal, Saiju Kurup, and Raveena Ravi in pivotal roles. The film is inspired from a true incident. It is produced by Faizal Raja under the banner of Little Crew Production, the film was released theatrically on 23 May 2025. The film did receive a U/A 16+ certificate for strong bloody violence.

== Plot ==
Set primarily within the confines of Kottayam Medical College, the narrative follows Ganga, a mute pregnant prisoner accused of murdering a political leader's son. As she is admitted to the hospital to deliver her baby, her husband Raghu devises a 24-hour escape plan involving a network of insiders. However, their past catches up with them as adversaries infiltrate the hospital, turning the escape mission into a perilous fight for survival. The film delves into themes of justice, revenge and the complexities of human relationships.

== Cast ==
- Sreenath Bhasi as Raghu
- Raveena Ravi as Ganga
- Lal as Kaappa Shivan
- Vani Viswanath as DIG Rani Thomas IPS
- Saiju Kurup as Sam
- Asha Madathil Sreekanth as Renuka
- Maala Parvathi as Doctor
- Gilu Joseph as Mini
- Abhiram Radhakrishnan as Sathyan
- T. G. Ravi as Adv. Gangadhara Menon
- Rajesh Sharma as Pappan
- Shobi Thilakan as Superintendent William Francis IPS
- Vijayakumar as SI Hakkim
- Boban Samuel as Mohan
- Muhammad Faizal as Muneer
- Jordy Poonjar as Sebastian

== Production ==
Azadi marks the directorial debut of Jo George. The screenplay was penned by Sagar, known for his work in films like Veekam and Sathyam Mathrame Bodhippikku. The film's cinematography was handled by Saneesh Stanly, with editing by Noufal Abdulla. Varun Unni composed the music, while the production design was led by Sahas Bala.

== Music ==
The film's music was composed by Varun Unni, with lyrics written by Harinarayanan. The soundtrack complements the film's intense narrative and emotional depth.

== Release ==
=== Theatrical ===
Azadi was released in theaters across India on 23 May 2025, coinciding with the 75th anniversary of Central Pictures, the film's distributor.

=== Home Media ===
The film secured its digital streaming rights with ManoramaMAX prior to its theatrical release, a rare move in the Malayalam film industry. The OTT release date is 27'th June 2025.

== Reception ==
Critics praised Azadi for its gripping narrative and strong performances. Sreenath Bhasi's portrayal of Raghu was highlighted for its intensity, while Vani Viswanath's return to the screen as a formidable police officer was well received. The film's unique setting—a prison break unfolding within a hospital—was noted for adding a fresh twist to the genre.
