= Bachelor Party (2012 film) =

- Theatrical release poster
- Directed by: Amal Neerad
- Screenplay by: Santhosh Echikkanam; Unni R.
- Produced by: Amal Neerad; Vasavan Jayasurya
- Starring: Rahman; Kalabhavan Mani; Indrajith Sukumaran; Vinayakan; Asif Ali
- Cinematography: Amal Neerad
- Edited by: Vivek Harshan
- Music by: Rahul Raj
- Production company: Amal Neerad Productions
- Distributed by: August Cinema
- Release date: 15 June 2012 (India)
- Running time: 120 minutes
- Country: India
- Language: Malayalam

Bachelor Party is a 2012 Indian Malayalam-language black comedy action film directed by Amal Neerad and written by Unni R. and Santhosh Echikkanam. It is adapted from Johnnie To's 2006 film Exiled. The film stars an ensemble cast including Rahman, Kalabhavan Mani, Indrajith Sukumaran and Vinayakan in titular roles alongside Asif Ali, Nithya Menen, John Vijay, Ashish Vidyarthi and Jinu Joseph in supporting roles while Prithviraj Sukumaran appears in an extended cameo appearance. The soundtrack and background score were composed by Rahul Raj.

Bachelor Party was released on 15 June 2012 to mixed reviews from critics and became a profitable venture according to Neerad.

== Plot ==
Tony is a former mobster who leads a quiet life with his wife Neethu and newborn child in an old mansion, having turned over a new leaf. Unfortunately, Prakash Kamath, a vengeful gangster whom Tony and his friends once tried to assassinate, has dispatched a pair of his henchmen to cut short the peaceful existence. Once they arrive, Tony's childhood friends and gangsters - Ayyappan, Fakeer, Benny, and Geevarghese - are determined to protect Tony. After a brief showdown, the whole group comes to an uneasy truce, lays down their weapons, and bonds over dinner (the men grew up together).

Reunited and searching for a way to save Tony, the friends visit a fixer called Chettiyar and his prostitute partner Vijanasurabhi. Chettiyar gives the gang two options: killing a gangster who is Kamath's rival or looting a large quantity of foreign currency being transported. The gang chooses the first option, and Tony makes them promise that if anything happens to him, his wife and son will be taken care of by them. As fixed, the gang meets up at a cinema theatre where the gangster is about to strike a deal. However, Kamath crashes in as the second party of the agreement since Chettiyar had double-crossed the friends. Recognizing Ayyappan and others, Kamath openly chastises and humiliates Tony, culminating in Tony shooting Kamath. A gunfight erupts in the theater, with Kamath and Tony being shot. The rival gangster, cornered by Kamath's men, agrees to share territory and profits, further agreeing to kill the gang of friends.

Having narrowly escaped the theatre shootout, the friends decide to take the severely shot Tony to an underground clinic for medical assistance. After negotiating a price, the doctor operates and removes the bullets from Tony. When the doctor is sewing up Tony's wound, Kamath and his men arrive to seek help for injuries sustained in the theater shootout. The friends manage to hide the still unconscious Tony, but he wakes up and slowly gets to his feet in a trance before collapsing. The rest of the friends try to escape, but Kamath holds Tony hostage and eventually shoots him. The gang desperately tries to retrieve Tony and escape. Knowing that he is near death, Tony asks his friends to take him back to Neethu and his daughter.

Heartbroken over Tony's death, Neethu buries him and leaves the villa with her daughter. The friends, hell-bent on taking revenge on Chettiyar and securing a livelihood for Neethu, leave in search of the currency consignment. They then come across the heavily guarded convoy carrying the notes. However, they also come across another gang attacking it. They witness all the security guards being killed by the chief security guard John Karim. The friends decide to help John by dispatching the rest of the gang. The friends, appreciating John's fighting skills, decide to split the currency with him and drive off to a hidden dock to transport the notes to a safe haven and a new life.

Meanwhile, Neethu gets captured by Chettiyar and Kamath, who, in turn, contact the gang of friends for the money. Ayyappan is told to meet Kamath at Chettiyar's den in exchange for Neethu and her child from getting killed. Determined to protect Neethu after Tony's death, the friends agree and leave John at the dock with Neethu's share of the money, telling him that they or she will return by dawn. Once at the meeting place, Kamath agrees to leave Neethu but tells them that Ayyappan must stay to face the consequences of not following orders. Ayyappan agrees to the deal, and the remainder of the friends leave with Neethu.

However, as they leave, Geevarghese informs Neethu about John and the boat, where he tells her to drive there. With Neethu safe, the greatly outnumbered friends open fire. In the resulting shootout, all are killed. The friends happily die smiling, knowing that they have kept their promise to Tony. At that time, Vijanasurabhi takes all the money, but while fleeing, she also ends up being killed.

In the end credits, the dead gangsters meet up in hell and party together.

== Cast ==
- Rahman as Benny
- Kalabhavan Mani as Ayyappan
  - Vishnu Unnikrishnan as Young Ayyappan
- Indrajith Sukumaran as Geevarghese
- Vinayakan as Fakeer
- Asif Ali as Tony
  - Chethan Jayalal as Young Tony
- John Vijay as Prakash Kamath
- Ashish Vidyarthi as Chettiyar
- Nithya Menen as Neethu
- Prithviraj Sukumaran as John Karim (extended cameo appearance)
- Remya Nambeesan as Vijanasurabhi
- Sunil Sukhada as Paul
- Jinu Joseph as Jerry Kalappurakal
- Lena as Sheela Mathews Kattuparambil
- Kochu Preman as Dr. Moorthy
- Thesni Khan as Nurse
- Padmapriya Janakiraman as a dancer in the song "Kappa Kappa"

== Production ==
"The flick might have few boys-will-be-boys, raunchy scenes, but that doesn't mean it only targets the male audience. It has all elements of an entertainer and, like its title suggests, it is about a bunch of bachelors having a blast."

— Amal Neerad

Amal Neerad tells that the film was inspired particularly from Sin City, a graphic novel that was turned into a film of the same name.

=== Genre ===
"The film could be called an action-comedy, but it is tough to include it in a particular genre." He also added that "it is a travelogue that involves the journey of some friends, but I won't call it a road movie either."

— Amal Neerad

Bachelor Party combines elements from several different film genres, most notably from spy, action thriller, comedy and musical.

== Soundtrack ==
Bachelor Party

Soundtrack album by Rahul Raj
- Released: 20 May 2012
- Recorded: 2012
- Genre: Feature film soundtrack
- Length: 17:46
- Language: Malayalam
- Label: Mathrubhumi Music
- Producer: Rahul Raj

Rahul Raj chronology
Oh My Friend (2011)	Bachelor Party (2012)	Kili Poyi (2013)

The music was composed, arranged and programmed by Rahul Raj while the lyrics were penned by Rafeeq Ahammed. The soundtrack was released on 20 May 2012 at a grand function at Kochi. Much before the release of the film; the soundtrack became a sensational super-hit across the state and was met with high critical acclaim.

Rahul Raj described the film's songs as "Britney Spears meets Kathakali!". The singers for Bachelor Party include actress Remya Nambeesan and singer Shreya Ghoshal working besides "fresh voices for fresh tunes" including C. J. Kuttappan, master of the Thayillam folk song group and singer Sunil Mathai, whom the composer calls as "the Kailash Kher of Mollywood".

The song "Kappa Kappa" became a favorite of viewers of the Swedish video streamer Forsen, as a reference to Twitch's "Kappa" emoticon. It was also considered an anthem used for "raids", as users would spam the emoticon on a random person's live stream.

"Director Amal Neerad is known for the stylish treatment he brings onscreen. And here I was, wanting to do something new in M'wood. Amal wanted something fresh in the music department, and I've tried my best to bring it in."

— Rahul Raj, The Times of India

No.	Title	Singers	Length
1.	"Karmukilil"	Shreya Ghoshal, Nikhil Mathew	4:07
2.	"Vijana Surabhi"	Remya Nambeesan, Kalamandalam Kolathapally, K. M. Udayan	4:01
3.	"Bachelor Life"	Sunil Mathai	3:28
4.	"Kappa Kappa"	C. J. Kuttappan, Sunil Mathai, Resmi Sateesh, Sricharan	3:06
5.	"We Don't Give a Fcuk ("Kick" of Bachelor Party)"	Rahul Raj ft. Majestic (Rap)	1:12
Total length:			17:46

== Sequel ==
In January 2026, director Amal Neerad announced a sequel to Bachelor Party, titled Bachelor Party D'eux. The announcement was made through a poster reveal shared on social media platforms.

The sequel is produced by Amal Neerad Productions along with Fahadh Faasil and Friends and Anwar Rasheed Entertainments. The film will feature a new set of characters rather than a direct continuation of the original ensemble. The film released on 19 November 2026.
