= Zeba Tommy =

Indian playback singer

- Born: Kozhikode, Kerala, India
- Occupation: Playback singer
- Award: Kerala State Film Award for Best Singer (2024)

Zeba Tommy is an Indian playback singer and song writer from Kerala, who works predominantly in the Malayalam film industry. In 2025, she won the Kerala State Film Award for Best Singer in the 55th Kerala State Film Awards.

== Biography ==
Zeba was born to Tommy Joseph and Reni at the Valiyaparambil house in Kozhikode. She completed her studies at Rajagiri School in Ernakulam and got a degree in BA English at Sacred Heart College in Thevara.

Zeba started learning Carnatic music at the age of six, and learned Western music on her own during her teenage years. She holds grades six and eight in rock and pop, and Western classical music, respectively, from the Trinity College London. Later, she trained in Music Production at the Tag Institute in Mumbai.

== Career ==
Zeba entered the playback singing while in the tenth grade by singing backing vocals for Gopi Sundar's compositions. She has since sung in 25 plus films, including I'm Game, Pookkalam, Officer on Duty, Kalki, Garudan, Lokah Chapter 1: Chandra, as well as to projects in Tamil and Telugu.

In 2016, she formed her own music band, 'Zeba Tommy Live'. After completing her degree, she is now based in Kochi & Mumbai, working full-time in the music industry. She has released 3 independent fully self-written and composed English songs, and is currently working on Malayalam originals

She has also left her voice in the promo for Sanjay Leela Bhansali's web series 'Heeramandi'. She has lent her voice in the advertisement industry for multiple commercials brands like Tanishq, Lakme, Nexa, Ujala, etc.

=== As a Lyricist ===
Zeba has also dipped her feet into the role of lyricist for multiple movies now. Her first writing role came with the song 'Queen of the Night' from Lokah. She then proceeded to pen lyrics for many other tracks, including 'Circus' (from I, Nobody), Flesh and Blood (from I'm Game), trailers for movies like Vijayam and Sardar 2, etc.

== Discography ==
=== Songs ===
Year	Song	Film	Musician	Lyricist	Co-Singer(s)
2021	"She's a song"	Irul	Sreerag Saji	Nazia Yusuf Izuddin	Amal Jose
2022	"Hey Veyile"	Haya	Varun Sunil	Manu Manjith	Christin Jos, Vishnu Sunil, Varun Sunil
2023	"Varoo Varoo Manase"	Pookkaalam	Sachin Warrier	Vinayak Sasikumar	Nil
2023	"Pareedumo (Ee Kaadin Ulkkannil)"	Olam	Arun Thomas	Anwar Ali, Amal Varghese	Evugin Emmanuel
2023	"Koorambaay Paayunno"	Garudan	Jakes Bejoy	Anwar Ali	Nil
2023	"Sadaa Iniyithaa (Ithalaarnnu Peytha Mazhayil)"	Philip's	Hesham Abdul Wahab	Anu Elizabeth Jose	Nil
2023	"Thaarangal Uyarunnu"	Philip's	Hesham Abdul Wahab	Anu Elizabeth Jose	Hesham Abdul Wahab
2024	"Kaattin Chiri Kelkkaam"	Secret	Jakes Bejoy	Santhosh Varma	Jakes Bejoy, Akhil J. Chand
2025	"Aarorum"	Am Ah	Gopi Sundar	Rafeeq Ahamed	Nil
2025	"Neon Ride"	Officer on Duty	Jakes Bejoy	Baby Jean, Ramya RamC	Baby Jean, Ramya RamC
2025	"Queen Of The Night (You Can Try But)"	Lokah Chapter 1: Chandra	Jakes Bejoy	Zeba Tommy	Nil
2026	"Churulmudi Churulo"	Avaraachan and Sons	Sanal Dev	Suhail Koya	Sid Sriram
2026	"I Am A Nobody"	I, Nobody	Jakes Bejoy	Zeba Tommy, Gabri	Jakes Bejoy, Gabri
2026	"Flesh and Blood (Kithabilillaatha)"	I'm Game	Jakes Bejoy	Baby Jean, Zeba Tommy, Adhri Joe	Baby Jean

== Awards and honors ==
in 2025, Zeba won the Kerala State Film Award for Best Female Playback Singer for the song beginning with "Aarorum..." from the film Am Ah.
