= Abhiram Radhakrishnan =

Indian film actor

- Born: September 1985 (age 41); Payyannur, Kerala, India
- Education: Maharaja Sayajirao University of Baroda
- Occupations: Actor; associate director
- Years active: 2015–present

Abhiram Radhakrishnan (born September 1985) is an Indian actor who works in Malayalam films. He started his career as an assistant director and debuted as an actor in 2015 with the film Chandrettan Evideya. As of May 2023, he has worked in more than 30 Malayalam films.

== Early life ==
Abhiram was born in Payannur, Kannur, Kerala. He holds a Masters in Art History and Criticism from the Maharaja Sayajirao University of Baroda. Before coming to the Malayalam cinema, Abhiram worked as an arts curator and critic. He has curated several art exhibitions across India.

== Film career ==
Abhiram started his career in Malayalam cinema as an assistant director in the 2015 film Chandrettan Evideya. In the same film, he made his acting debut in a minor role. His role as Kunjippa in Sudani from Nigeria (2018) and Manaaf in Parava (2017) was noticed. In Unda (2019), Abhiram played a notable supporting role of a policeman. His performance in Iratta (2023) as CPO Bineesh, a murder suspect was acclaimed. The same year he played major supporting roles in the films Enkilum Chandrike and Jackson Bazaar Youth. As of May 2023, he has worked in more than 15 films as an actor and in numerous films as an associate director which includes Irul, Anjam Pathira, Allu Ramendran, Halaal Love Story, Jan. E. Man, Kooman and Pachuvum Atbuthavilakkum.

== Filmography ==
Year	Title	Role	Notes
2015	Chandrettan Evideya	Abhiram Pothuval	
2017	Parava	Manaf	
2018	Sudani from Nigeria	Kunjippa	
2019	Unda	PC Unni Krishnan	
2020	Anjaam Pathiraa	SI Pradeep Raman	
2020	Halal Love Story	Abhi	
2021	Kaanekkaane	Sreejith	
2021	Jan. E. Man	Akshay Kumar	
2022	Bhoothakaalam	Shyam	
2022	Pathrosinte Padappukal	Sibi	
2022	Mike	Umesh, Antony's friend	
2022	Visudha Mejo	Paily	
2022	Koshichaayante Paramb	Samson	
2022	Vichithram	Jango	
2022	Kooman	CPO Vinod	
2023	Iratta	CPO Bineesh	
2023	Dear Vaappi	Ajith	
2023	Enkilum Chandrike	Bibeesh Balan N	
2023	Neelavelicham	Ramdas	
2023	Pachuvum Athbutha Vilakkum	Peter	
2023	Jackson Bazaar Youth	SI Aravindan	
2023	Voice of Sathyanathan	DYSP Shihab	
2023	Kasargold	Vinod	
2023	Falimy	Pramod	
2024	Manjummel Boys	Anil	
2024	Thundu	Gireesh	
2024	Secret		
2024	Bharathanatyam	Subhash	
2024	Swargam	Freddy	
2024	Sookshmadarshini	Finance Manager	
2025	Get-Set Baby	Aji Mathew	
2025	Azadi	Sathyan	
2025	Dheeran	Dixon kuttampuzha	
2025	Thalavara	Shine	
2026	Bharathanatyam 2 Mohiniyattam	Subhash	
2026	Karakkam	Nakulan	
2026	Dridam	Manoj	
2026	Orijinal		
2026	Udumbanchola Vision		
2027	Harivarasanam †	TBA	
