= Bheeshma Parvam =

2022 Indian film by Amal Neerad

- Theatrical release poster
- Directed by: Amal Neerad
- Written by: Amal Neerad; Devadath Shaji; Ravisankar; RJ Murugan (dialogues)
- Produced by: Amal Neerad
- Starring: Mammootty; Soubin Shahir; Sreenath Bhasi; Shine Tom Chacko; Farhaan Faasil; Sudev Nair
- Cinematography: Anend C. Chandran
- Edited by: Vivek Harshan
- Music by: Sushin Shyam
- Production company: Amal Neerad Productions
- Distributed by: A & A Release
- Release date: 3 March 2022
- Running time: 144 minutes
- Country: India
- Language: Malayalam
- Box office: est. ₹88.1 crore

Bheeshma Parvam (transl. The Chapter of Bheeshma) is a 2022 Indian Malayalam-language action thriller film produced, written, and directed by Amal Neerad. The film stars Mammootty in the lead role along with a supporting cast of Soubin Shahir, Sreenath Bhasi, Shine Tom Chacko, Farhaan Faasil, Sudev Nair, Nadhiya, Dileesh Pothan, Jinu Joseph, Harish Uthaman, Nedumudi Venu, KPAC Lalitha, Veena Nandakumar, Srindaa, Lena, and Anagha. The film is co-written by Amal Neerad along with Devadath Shaji, Ravisankar and Additional Dialogues Written by RJ Murukan.

Amal Neerad and Mammootty were planning to film Bilal, the sequel to Big B, however due to the COVID-19 lockdown, the project was delayed and they decided to collaborate for a small-scale film. Sushin Shyam composed the soundtrack, whilst the editing and cinematography were handled by Vivek Harshan and Anend C. Chandran, respectively.

Bheeshma Parvam was released on 3 March 2022 and received critical acclaim from critics and audiences alike who praised the cast performances (especially Mammootty, Soubin Shahir and Shine Tom Chacko), direction, screenwriting, action sequences, cinematography, and music, but criticised its pace and runtime. The film broke many box office records for a Malayalam film, crossing the ₹50 crore (US$6.6 million) mark on the 6th day of its release. Bheeshma Parvam grossed over ₹86 crore (US$8.9 million). (Note: 115 crore is the total amount collected by the film including external revenues like satellite rights and OTT rights. The overall box office collection of the film is over 85 crore.) The film remains as one of the highest-grossing Malayalam films of all time.

== Plot ==
In the late 1980s, Michael has been handling his family, one of the wealthiest ones in Kochi, and its business after his eldest brother Paily's death as Mathai, the second sibling is inept. Michael's late father Varkey has five children: Paily, Mathai, Michael, Simon and Susan; Paily was married to a Muslim Fathima, who after his death, was subsequently married to Ali, son of Majeed (who was the right hand of Varkey), with whom she has two sons Ajas and Ami. Mathai and his wife Molly happen to have two sons namely Peter and Paul, both of whom deeply dislike Michael but simultaneously fear him along with the other members of family like Simon as Michael had horrifically slayed the sons of Kocheri family, who had assassinated Paily.

Simon is a priest while Susan married a corrupted Tamil police officer from Nagercoil, named Martin and has two children: Rachel and Abel, but her and her children's relationship with Martin is strained over Martin's infidelities. During the birthday party of Peter's son, Pauly, a woman whose son Prince was burnt to death by his girlfriend Elsa's high-caste family, and Elsa approach Michael, requesting him to help her seek revenge against them. Shivankutty, Michael's right-hand man beat Elsa's family members, who are responsible for Prince's death while it is disclosed that except for Annamma and Michael, Fathima and her sons are dear to none of the family. Michael offers Ami, a warehouse to set up a cafe but Peter and Paul, who control the warehouse, confronts Michael over his act but he restrains them from indulging in family business as it results in only losses.

Molly's brother T V James, an MP, consults Michael, appealing him for support to gain votes in the next elections but Michael refuses to accept as he has done nothing good for the public ever since he was elected. Their anger for Michael causes Peter, Paul, James and Simon to team up against him and put an end to his dominance over the rest of the family. James suggests the Kocheri family's head Iravi Pillai, who has a deep hatred for Michael for murdering his two sons namely, Madhavan Nair and Sudhevan Nair (who had assassinated Paily), that he bring back his grandson Kocheri Rajan Madhavan Nair, a notorious crime boss known as Bada Rajan in Mumbai for him to avenge his father's and uncle's murders. The affair between Rachel and Ami is divulged to the family leading to a discussion, where Martin clearly refuses to allow their wedding, but Michael vows to unite them keeping the tradition what his parents Varkey and Annamma did, when Paily had married Fathima.

Martin, who hates Michael from earlier for preventing him from having any extra-marital relationships, now teams up with Peter and others as he dislikes Michael involving in the matter of Rachael's wedding. Rajan, Peter and Paul kills Ami on his way back from the cafe and Ami's friend Rahim informs Ajas that Peter and Paul were spotted at the crime spot when Ami was killed. Enraged, Ajas arrives at the house of Anjootti family and attacks Peter and Paul but Michael resists him and rebukes him as there is no explicit evidence against them, but warns Peter and Paul. Susan, Rachel and Abel move out from Martin after Ami's death and Susan and Shivankutty tell Michael that Martin has an involvement in Paily's and Ali's deaths (Subplot: Susan reveals that, Martin had once laid hand on her saying that it was the Kocheris who helped him in a graft case when Varkey and Paily refused to interfere. And when Paily found out, he beat the crap out of him. On his way back, after that punch-up, was Paily murdered. Alongside, Shivankutty reveals that when he and Ali had returned from Rameswaram, Ali after dropping him home, was on the way to meet Martin and that was when he met with the accident). While returning home from Susan's flat, a gang of thugs instructed by Rajan brutally attack Michael and his men, which results in Shivankutty's death.

Michael is hospitalised and regains his consciousness after three days, vowing to retribute and end the perpetrators in his family. Upon being instructed by Michael, Ajas kills Martin by driving a truck over him and later meets James, where he gives him a file that exposes all of his illegal activities. Scoffing Ajas, James claims that he shall return in two days from prison using his influence but Ajas counter-attacks by telling that he and Michael will be waiting to finish him. The police arrests a terrified James. Subsequently, Ajas meets a few victims of Simon's scandal and persuades them to file a case against him, swearing support. As a result, Simon is arrested. In a garage later, Ajas kills Peter and threatens Paul to leave from Kochi. Rajan is executed on commands from Rajan's mentee Chota Rajan. Michael and Ajas visit Kocheri family to confirm Rajan's death. Michael passes on his position to Ajas.

== Cast ==
- Mammootty as Michael "Michaelappan" Anjootti, the patriarch of the Anjootti family
- Nedumudi Venu as Iravi Pillai
- Sudev Nair as Rajan Madhavan Nair
- Soubin Shahir as Ajas Ali, Ali and Fatima's elder son
- Sreenath Bhasi as Ami Ali, Ali and Fatima's younger son
- Shine Tom Chacko as Peter Anjootti, Mathai and Molly's elder son
- Farhaan Faasil as Paul Anjootti, Mathai and Molly's younger son
- Dileesh Pothan as MP T. V. James, Molly's brother
- Jinu Joseph as Fr. Simon Anjootti, Michael's younger brother
- Harish Uthaman as ACP Martin Rajadurai, Susan's husband
- Nadhiya as Fathima Ali, Ali's wife and Anjootti Paily's first wife
- Anagha as Rachel, Martin and Susan's daughter; Ami's girlfriend
- Shebin Benson as Abel, Martin and Susan's son
- Lena as Susan, Michael's younger sister
- Srinda as Rasiya, Ajas's wife
- Veena Nandakumar as Jessy, Peter's wife
- Anasuya Bharadwaj as Alice, Michael's friend
- Abu Salim as Shivankutty, Michael's right-hand-man
- Manohari Joy as Annamma
- Nisthar Sait as Mathai Anjootti, Michael's older brother
- Maala Parvathi as Molly, Mathai's wife
- Kottayam Ramesh as Mani
- Pauly Valsan as Pauly
- Dhanya Ananya as Elsa, Pauly's daughter-in-law
- Amala Rose as Stephy, Paul's love interest
- Rohit Pathak as Chhotta Rajan
- Arun Kumar as Rahman Faizal
- P. J. Antony as Varkey Anjootti (photo presence)

=== Family tree ===
Dotted lines indicate a love relationship between characters, and dashed lines indicate marriage relationship between characters.

† Indicates a deceased character.

Anjootti Family
Kocheri Family

Varkey †	Annamma	Iravipillai	Karthyayaniyamma
Madhavan †	Rema †	Sudhevan †
Ali †	Fathima	Paily †	Mathai	Moly	Michael	Fr. Simon	Susan	Martin †	Rajan Madhavan Nair †
Peter †	Jessy	Paul	Stephy	Rachel	Abel
Ajaz	Rasiya	Ami †

== Production ==
=== Development ===
Mammootty and Amal Neerad were originally supposed to collaborate for the sequel to Big B. The film, however, was put on hold due to the COVID-19 pandemic as several scenes were to be shot abroad. The two subsequently teamed up for Bheeshma Parvam. Bheeshma Parvam is the reunion of Amal Neerad and Mammootty after 14 years. The film is produced by the director Amal Neerad himself under the banner of Amal Neerad Productions. The film is written by Amal Neerad and Devadath Shaji with Ravisankar credited as additional screenwriter. RJ Murukan has penned the additional dialogues.

=== Filming ===
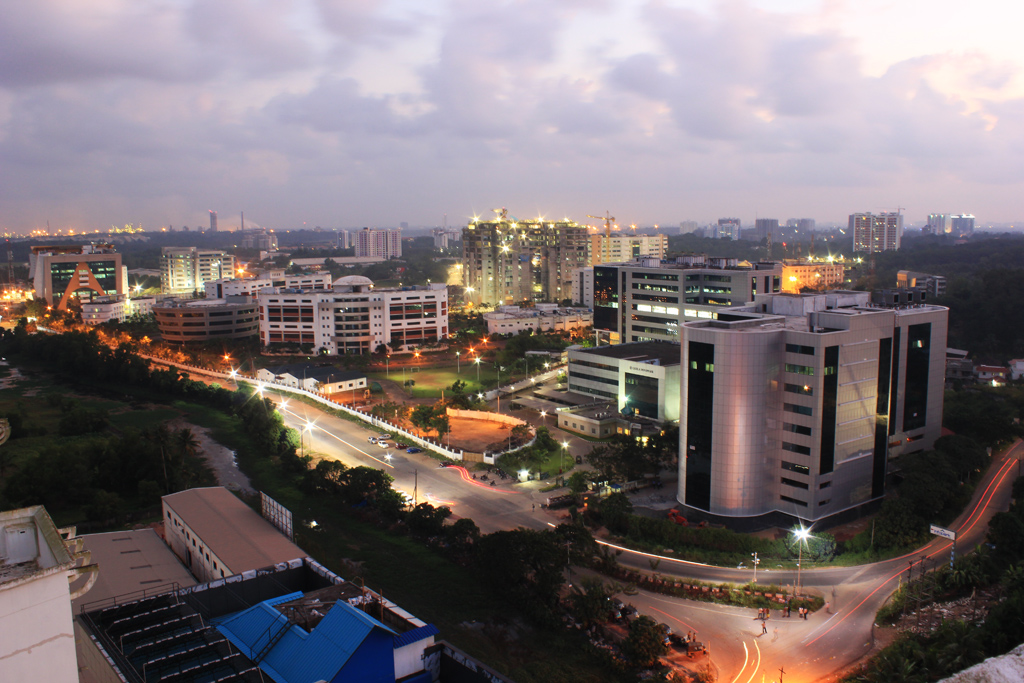
The integral portions of the film has been shot in Kochi.

On 21 February 2021, principal photography began in Kochi. The filming of the film has been wrapped up on 21 September 2021.

== Soundtrack ==
The film's soundtrack album and score was composed by Sushin Shyam. In an interview, Sushin revealed that making process of the soundtrack was a process that kept on evolving throughout the production, explaining: "When I did the teaser of Bheeshma Parvam, I had this idea, which wasn't connected to the film at all. But after that, we thought of including that too in the film. So, basically it's a process that keeps evolving, when you create a new tune, you think why not include it too. When I composed the track Parudeesa, it sort of gave me an idea about the music of the entire film."

The soundtrack album received positive reviews from critics. Sajin Shrijith of The New Indian Express stated that "Sushin Shyam's instantly immersive music alternates between various genres, from classical to contemporary and, at one point, evokes one of the spaghetti-western scores of Ennio Morricone". The critic Veeyen wrote, "Sushin Shyam's arresting musical score leaves an extensive impression, and the upbeat track Parudeesa stands out from among the lot".

== Release ==
=== Theatrical ===
The film was originally scheduled to be released on eve of Vijayadashami (12 October 2021), but was postponed due to shooting works. The film was then scheduled to release on 23 December 2021 but was postponed again. It was scheduled to release on 24 February 2022, but it was again delayed. It finally was released on 3 March 2022.

=== Home media ===
The satellite and digital rights of the film were secured by Asianet and Disney+ Hotstar. The film was streamed on Disney+ Hotstar on 1 April 2022, while it was premiered in Asianet on 7 September 2022 coinciding with Mammootty's birthday and Onam.

== Reception ==
=== Box office ===
On the first day of its release, Bheeshma Parvam collected ₹6.95 crore (US$720,000) at the domestic box office. On its Fifth day, the film collected ₹30 crore (US$3.1 million) from Indian box office and ₹25 crore (US$2.6 million) from overseas. It crossed the ₹50 crore (US$5.2 million) mark at the Kerala box office alone, within the first 25 days of its release. The film collected ₹32.6 crore (US$3.4 million) mark at the UAE GCC box office alone. At the Kerala box office, the film emerged as the seventh all-time highest grosser beating Drishyam. It covered the lifetime collection of Drishyam within the first 18 days of its release. On its third week, the film grossed ₹50 crore (US$5.2 million) in India and ₹45 crore (US$4.7 million) in overseas for a worldwide total of ₹82 crore (US$8.5 million) approximately. The film grossed ₹47.10 crore at the Kerala box office in its final run.Bheeshma Parvam earned ₹115 crore (US$12 million) worldwide business, (Note: 115 crore is the total amount collected by the film including external revenues like satellite rights and OTT rights. The overall box office collection of the film is over 85 crore.) and grossed ₹88.1 crore (US$9.1 million). Bheeshma Parvam emerged as the highest grossing Malayalam film of the year 2022, and fourth-highest-grossing Malayalam film of all time in both the worldwide and domestic box office.

=== Critical response ===
Sajin Shrijith of The New Indian Express wrote "Don't go in if you expect a fight scene every five minutes. We get a fair amount of action, but it's the character-centric moments in Bheeshma Parvam that tower above all else. And it has so many fascinating characters. None of them looked out of place or unnecessary. Everyone has something to contribute. Some traits are suggested through subtle and clever flourishes, like when Shine Tom Chacko's character Peter reveals his true feelings for a male actor".

Anna M. M. Vetticad of Firstpost rated the film 3.75 out of 5 stars and wrote, “Bheeshma Parvam resides somewhere on the cusp between the Malayalam New New Wave that has taken India by storm during the pandemic and the conventional commercial cinema that continues to get an audience in Kerala. The film's fight scenes are stylised, yet not repugnantly bloody and in-your-face. The leading man is lionised, but not to a nauseous extent. Women are given some space, but the action is entirely in the hands of men. It is a polished production, but not distractingly glossy. If I had to pick a category, I'd put Bheeshma Parvam in the not-bad-not-great slot. It's okay.”

Deepa Soman of The Times of India rated 3.5 out of 5 and wrote "Right from the beginning, the film is careful enough to set its pace balanced and engaging, even as it organically establishes the characters, along with their backgrounds, place in the family tree and more with ease. Mammootty pleases as the invincible hero through his towering presence, body language, punch dialogues, stunts and more, giving those seeking entertainment enough moments to feel enthralled. Shine Tom Chacko, Sudev Nair and Soubin too are in top form in their respective roles. The treatment of the story has ensured that the women characters in it respectfully portrayed and a special attention to be politically correct, rightly so, is evident and laudable".

SR Praveen of The Hindu stated "All these characters still do not help paper over the fact that much of the basic story lacks any novelty. The simmering discontent within his home, and a man waiting to take revenge for Michael's actions in the past come together to haunt him; but knowing the pattern of such films, we certainly know how it will turn out. Until the last half an hour, Amal builds the film and Michael's character patiently in an unhurried pace that the audience can't be blamed for expecting it all to burst out like a dam towards the end. But this build-up kind of fizzles out towards the end, in what turns out to be a rather tame and hurried climax.".

Sowmya Rajendran of The News Minute gave 4 out of 5 stars and wrote "The major players get their own ‘mass’ introduction scenes, and how heartwarming it is to see the audience welcome not only Mammootty but also Soubin, Sreenath Bhasi and Shine Tom Chacko with cheers. If we must persist with drawing parallels with the Mahabharata, Even without putting too much thought into comparisons and parallels with the epic or the Hollywood classic, Bheeshma Parvam still works. There are unexpected moments of humour in the film that had me chuckling several times; like the grandmother who's watching The Terminator and advises Michael to buy a machine gun to finish his ‘work’ as a gangster quickly".

== Legacy ==
A scene in the film where Michael (Mammootty) tells the photographer "Chambiko" (which translates to "Click the photo") became a viral trend on social media platforms such as YouTube Shorts and Instagram Reels. It trends weddings, family photoshoots, alumni meets and public events became the perfect venue to enact this dialogue, which is followed by Sushin Shyam's earworm of a BGM. The trend was not limited to family photos. Other film celebrities, politicians, teachers, police officers, sportspersons even soldiers jumped on the 'Chambiko' bandwagon. Politicians including state Minister for Education and Labour V. Sivankutty. Other notable politicians who also joined in on the trend include, Vatakara MLA Parakkal Abdulla and Nilambur MLA P. V. Anwar.
