= Sumesh and Ramesh =

2021 Indian Malayalam film

- Theatrical release poster
- Directed by: Sanoop Thykoodam
- Written by: Joseph Vijesh and Sanoop Thykoodam
- Produced by: Fareed Khan; Shaleel Azeez
- Starring: Sreenath Bhasi; Balu Varghese
- Cinematography: Alby
- Edited by: Ayoob Khan
- Music by: Neha Nair; Yakzan Gary Pereira
- Production companies: Whitesands Media; KL7 Entertainments
- Release date: 10 December 2021 (India)
- Country: India
- Language: Malayalam

Sumesh and Ramesh is a 2021 Indian Malayalam-language comedy drama film directed by Sanoop Thykoodam. The film stars Balu Varghese and Sreenath Bhasi. It was produced by Fareed Khan and Shaleel Azeez. The film was released in theatres on 10 December 2021.

== Synopsis ==
The film tells the story about two brothers, Sumesh and Ramesh, who live a pleasant life by playing cricket and hanging out with their friends until a tragedy strikes their family, forcing them to bond together to find a solution.

== Cast ==
- Sreenath Bhasi as Sumesh
- Balu Varghese as Ramesh
- Praveena as Praveena, Sumesh and Ramesh mother
- Salim Kumar as Indhu, Sumesh and Ramesh father
- Mithradev as Antony Thomas
- Arjun Ashokan as the Antagonist
- Karthik Jith as Paul
- Diljith as John Mathew
- Abhay Krishna as Jithin
- Devika Krishnan as Sreekutty
- Karthika Vellathery as Aswathy Arookutti

== Production ==
The story of the film is written by Joseph Vijesh and Sanoop Thykoodam. The film was produced by Fareed Khan and co-produced by Shibu Devadath and Shaleel Azeez. While the music is composed by Neha Nair and Yakzan Gary Pereira, Alby handled the cinematography. The film is edited by Ayoob Khan.

== Music ==
Track list
No.	Title	Lyrics	Singer (s)	Length
1.	"Neeyum Njanum"	Vinayak Sasikumar	Sangeeth, Neha S Nair	3:12
2.	"Cla Cla Cla"	Tenson Antony	Tenson Antony	1:51
3.	"Kinavil"	Vinayak Sasikumar	Neha S Nair	2:46
