= Jinu Joseph =

Indian actor

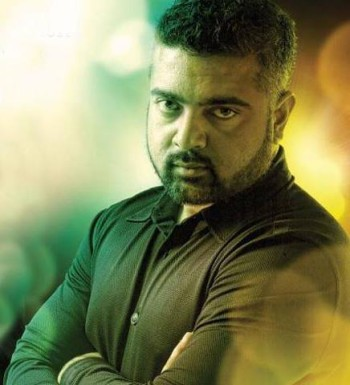
- Born: 21 December 1975 (age 50); Kochi, Kerala, India
- Occupation: Actor
- Years active: 2007–present
- Spouse: Leah Samuel (m. 2012)
- Children: Mark Antony Joseph (b. 2020)

Jinu Joseph (born 21 December 1975) is an Indian actor who works in Malayalam films.

== Personal life ==
Jinu Joseph married Leah Samuel on 14 November 2012. They have been in a relationship since 2010. They have a son Mark Antony Joseph born on 3 October 2020. Jinu completed a course in acting from Acting Studio in New York.

== Filmography ==
Key
| † | Denotes films that have not yet been released |

| Year | Title | Role | Notes |
|---|---|---|---|
| 2007 | Big B | Contract killer | |
| 2009 | Kerala Cafe | Boy's father | Anthology film; segment: "Bridge" |
| 2009 | Sagar Alias Jacky | Ferad | |
| 2010 | Anwar | Akbar Jamaludeen | |
| 2011 | Chappa Kurish | Tony Sebastian | |
| 2012 | Bachelor Party | Jerry Kalappurakal | |
| 2012 | Ustad Hotel | Owner of Beach Bay International | |
| 2013 | Neelakasham Pachakadal Chuvanna Bhoomi | Rider | |
| 2013 | North 24 Kaatham | Manager at Hari's Office | |
| 2013 | D Company | Vishnu | Anthology film; segment: "The Day of Judgement" |
| 2014 | Iyobinte Pusthakam | Ivan | |
| 2014 | Karma Cartel | Q | |
| 2015 | Rani Padmini | Giri | |
| 2016 | Aviyal | Wild Horse | Tamil anthology film; Segment: "Eli" |
| 2017 | Comrade In America | Cyril | |
| 2018 | Vikadakumaran | Roshi Balachandran | |
| 2018 | Varathan | George | |
| 2019 | Virus | Dr. John Jacob | |
| 2020 | Anjaam Pathiraa | ACP Anil Madhavan | |
| 2020 | Trance | Dr. Jase John | |
| 2021 | Bheemante Vazhi | Kosthepp | |
| 2022 | Sayanna Varthakal | Fasal | |
| 2022 | Bheeshma Parvam | Fr. Simon Anjoottikkaaran | |
| 2023 | Christopher | 'Guile' Brother Suresh | |
| 2023 | Nalla Nilavulla Rathri | Dominic | |
| 2023 | Antony | Lawrence | |
| 2024 | Sureshanteyum Sumalathayudeyum Hrudayahariyaya Pranayakadha | | |
| 2024 | Adios Amigo | Alex Paul | |
| 2026 | Patriot | | |
| 2026 | Udumbanchola Vision | | |
