= Sreenath Bhasi =

Indian actor (born 1988)

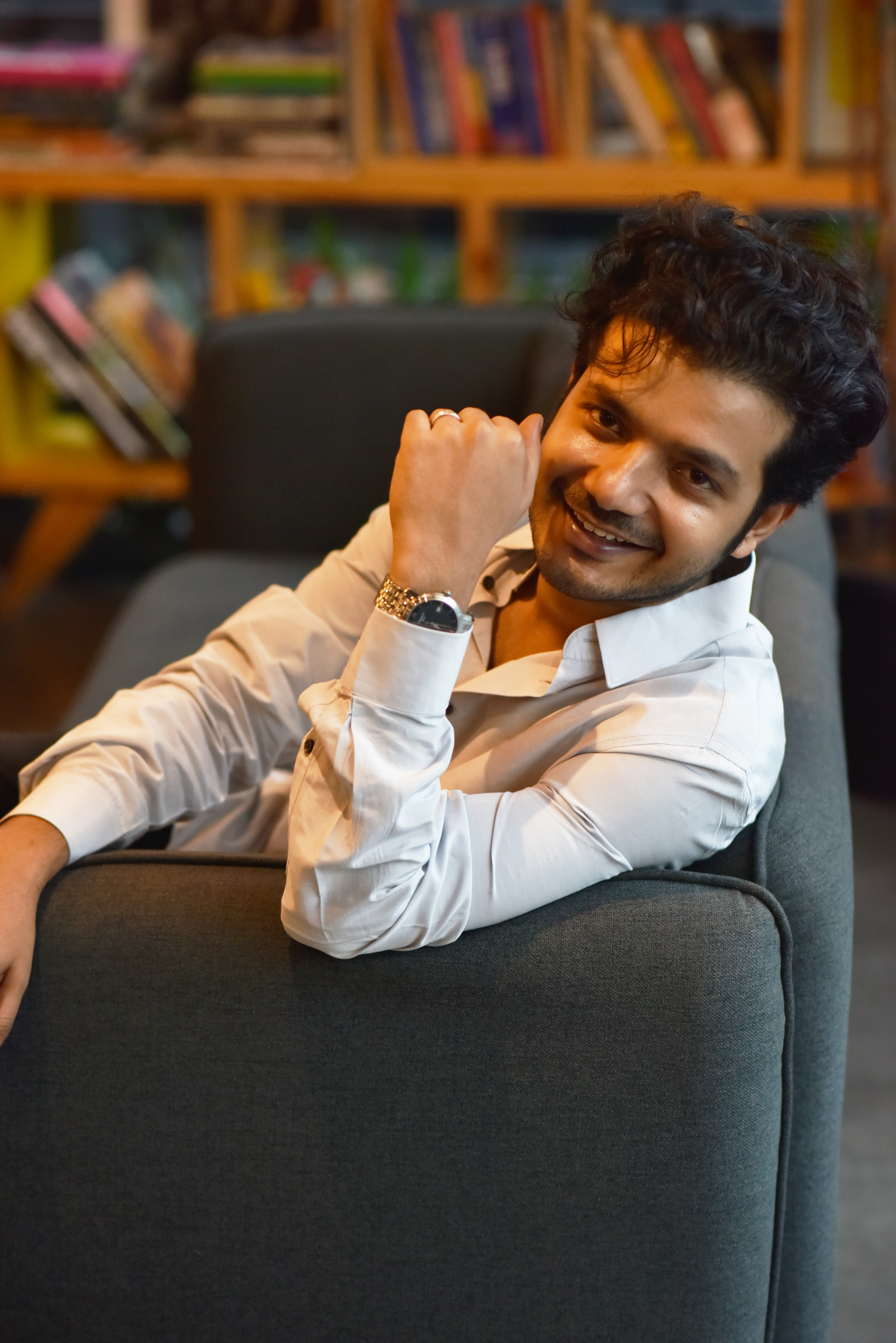
- Sreenath in 2019
- Occupations: Actor; singer
- Years active: 2011–present
- Spouse: Reethu (m. 2016) Divorced

Sreenath Bhasi (born 29 May 1988) is an Indian actor, disco jockey and singer who works in Malayalam films.

== Career ==
He started his career as a Radio Jockey in Red FM 93.5 and worked as a Video Jockey at the same time. He gained recognition in the film Da Thadiya. He has been featured in numerous films. He was a part of the Christian alternative metal band named Crimson Wood and is currently the vocalist of an experimental djent band from Kerala.

== Personal life ==
Sreenath married his long-time girlfriend Reethu Zachariah on 9 December 2016 in Kochi. They got divorced in 2024.

== Filmography ==
Key
†	Denotes films that have not yet been released

Year	Title	Role	Notes	Ref.
2011	Pranayam	Arun		
2012	22 Female Kottayam	Bony		
2012	Arike	Anjan		
2012	Ustad Hotel	Kallumekkayas		
2012	Ayalum Njanum Thammil	Rahul		
2012	Da Thadiya	Sunny Jose Prakash		
2013	Honey Bee	Abu		
2013	North 24 Kaatham	Siddharth		
2014	Masala Republic	Perumbavoor Anto		
2014	The Last Supper			
2014	Beware of Dogs	Sunny		
2014	Once Upon A Time There Was A Kallan			
2015	KL 10 Patthu	Jinn		
2015	Rasputin	Radhenathan/Radhs		
2015	Nikkah	Kannan		
2015	Anuraga Karikkin Vellam	Kichu		
2015	Rani Padmini	Trekkar		
2016	Jacobinte Swargarajyam	Ebin		
2017	Honey Bee 2: Celebrations	Abu		
2017	Honey Bee 2.5	Himself		
2017	Parava	Drug addict		
2017	Goodalochana	Ajas		
2018	Kallai FM	Rafi Mohammed		
2018	BTech	Jojo		
2018	Iblis	Subair		
2019	Allu Ramendran	Amrutesh		
2019	Kumbalangi Nights	Bonny		
2019	Virus	Dr. Abid Rahman		
2019	Aakasha Ganga 2	Taittas		
2019	Happy Sardar	Sharaf		
2020	Anjaam Pathiraa	Andrew		
2020	Trance	Kunjan		
2020	Kappela	Roy		
2021	Third World Boys		Direct television premiere	
2021	Home	Antony Oliver Twist	OTT release Amazon Prime	
2021	Sumesh and Ramesh	Sumesh		
2022	Bheeshma Parvam	Ami		
2022	Chattambi	Kariah George		
2022	Padachone Ingalu Kaatholee	Dineshan		
2023	Lovefully Yours Veda	Ranjan Abhraham		
2023	Corona Dhavan	Paambu Gladson		
2023	Dance Party			
2024	LLB: Life Line of Bachelors	Sibi		
2024	Manjummel Boys	Subhash		
2025	Idi Mazha Kaatu			
2025	Azadi	Raghu		
2025	Once upon A Time There Was a Kallan	Hari		
2025	Pongala			
2025	Khajuraho Dreams	Ishan		
2026	Karakkam	Dhanush		
2026	Avaraachan & Sons	Jaison		
2026	Udumbanchola Vision	Mithun		
2026	Orijinal	Rijin		
2026	Bachelor Party D'eux	Xavi		
TBA	Orijinal †	TBA	Post Production	
TBA	Unlock †	TBA	Post Production	
TBA	Dhuniyavinte Orattathu †	TBA	Filming	
TBA	Namukku Kodathiyil Kaanam †	TBA	Filming	

== Controversies ==
Verbal Abuse Case

Kerala Police filed a case against actor Sreenath Bhasi on 23 September 2022 for allegedly abusing a YouTube channel anchor. On the same day Bhasi abused a Malayalam radio journalist during a live interview for Red FM. On 26 September 2022, Sreenath Bhasi was taken into police custody for questioning in the verbal abuse case.

Ban by association

In 2023, FEFKA and Film Producers Union banned him for misconduct in film shooting locations.

Drug Case

In October 2024, Kerala Police questioned him and Prayaga Martin in connection with a cocaine seizure made from gangster Om Prakash in Kochi. In 2025, a peddlers arrested from Alappuzha gave statement that she used to supply Kush (cannabis) to him and Shine Tom Chacko. Producer Haseeb Malabar also accused actor of ganja usage in film sets.

Hit and Run Case

A case has been filed against actor in for allegedly hitting a biker on 15 October 2024. The incident, linked to a drug party investigation, has raised questions about his involvement. Police are continuing their inquiries into the situation.

Drug Case 2025

The actor made it clear to producer that he needed cannabis to get into the mood to act. The actor has been accused of demanding cannabis during the shoot of the movie Namukku Court-il Kaanam by film producer Haseeb Malabar.
