= Feminichi Fathima =

2024 Malayalam film

- Theatrical release poster
- Directed by: Fasil Muhammed
- Written by: Fasil Muhammed
- Screenplay by: Fasil Muhammed
- Produced by: Thamar K. V.; Sudheesh Skaria; Fasil Muhammed
- Starring: Shamla Hamza
- Cinematography: Prince Francis
- Edited by: Fasil Muhammed
- Music by: Shiyadh Kabir
- Distributed by: Wayfarer Films
- Release date: 1 October 2024
- Country: India
- Language: Malayalam

Feminichi Fathima is a 2024 Indian Malayalam-language film written and directed by Fasil Muhammed. The film is a social drama that explores themes of gender equality, cultural traditions, and personal empowerment through the lens of its protagonist, Fathima. Shamla Hamza won the Kerala State Film Award for Best Actress for her performance in the titular role.

In 2026, the film received National Film Award for Best Malayalam Feature Film at 72nd National Film Awards.

== Plot ==
The film centres on Fathima, a young woman from a conservative community in Ponnani, Kerala, who challenges societal norms to assert her identity and independence. The narrative follows her journey as she navigates the conflicts between traditional expectations and her aspirations for education, freedom, and equality.

== Cast ==
- Shamla Hamza as Fathima
- Kumar Sunil as Usthad
- Musthafa Sargam as Kunjutti Usthad
- Viji Viswanath as Suhara
- Praseetha as Jameela
- C.V.N.Babu as Installment man
- Raji R Unnsi as Tamil Lady
- Babitha Basheer as Shana
- Pushpa Rajan as Umma
- Fasil Muhammed as Faisal
- Binshad Arikkad as a Mobile Shop salesman
- Abhilash Chungath as Usthad
- Akhil Nazim as Asif
- Hanana Praveen as Aamina
- Salam Ponnani as Meenkari
- Akash Prahladan as Muthu

== Production ==
Feminichi Fathima is produced by Thamar K. V., Sudheesh Skaria and Fasil Muhammed. The editing and the screenplay are done by Fasil Muhammed, with cinematography by Prince Francis.

== Release ==
Feminichi Fathima was screened during the 29th International Film Festival of Kerala.

Feminichi Fathima started streaming on ManoramaMAX OTT on December 12, 2025.

== Reception ==
=== Critical reception ===
Feminichi Fathima received positive reviews from critics.

Anna Mathews of The Times of India rated the film 4/5 stars and described it as an "activism film that's all heart". She praised the subtle portrayal of feminism, the authentic depiction of interactions among different women, and the cast's performance. She further noted that the film also uses clever touches to show the absurdity of certain religious rituals in an inoffensive, authentic manner. She concluded that the film is "a lesson for the whole family with plenty of heart."

Sajin Shrijith of The Week rated the film 4/5 stars and called it "a quiet, humorous tale of rebellion." He compared it to the 2021 film The Great Indian Kitchen as "a perfect companion piece", noting that while it imitates the same views about household patriarchy, it differs vastly in its gentle, humorous treatment. He praised the cast's performance and compared the film's humour to the works of filmmakers like Ousmane Sembène and Aki Kaurismäki, as well as the Malayalam film Sudani from Nigeria, helping it avoid "arthouse cliches." He further wrote that Feminichi Fathima "isn't a film interested in loud outbursts and fiery speeches. It knows that loud and clear statements don't necessarily require a raising of the voice."

Anandu Suresh of The Indian Express rated the film 4/5 stars, calling it a "A powerful film portraying challenges and resilience of stay-at-home wives, mothers." He wrote, Fasil Muhammed's debut film is a compelling exploration of the struggles endured by stay-at-home wives and mothers, exposing the casual inhumanity they face daily.

Vivek Santhosh of The New Indian Express rated the film 4/5 stars and described it as a "rollicking rebellion that wakes up to change." He wrote, "Feminichi Fathima stands out not just for its message but for how it delivers it, leaving you with a smile and the lingering thought that sometimes, the simplest victories are the most profound. In a world where women like Fathima are often expected to fade into the background, this film celebrates the quiet strength and resilience of the everyday woman. It is a reminder that change begins with the ordinary—a new mattress, an assertive decision and a refusal to conform."

Gayathri Krishna of OTTPlay rated the film 4/5 stars and wrote, "With no frills, Fasil Muhammed's movie offers a poignant yet satirical look at male dominance with impressive performances."

Athira M. of The Hindu wrote, "The film’s layered narrative does not give patriarchy a tight slap. Instead, it is told in a subtle but satirical way that the point is not lost either on the characters or the audience."

== Accolades ==
Year	Award	Category	Recipient	Result	Notes	Ref.
2024	72nd National Film Awards	Best Malayalam Feature Film	Fasil Muhammed	Won		
2025	55th Kerala State Film Awards	Best Actress	Shamla Hamza	Won	Debut Award	
2025	14th South Indian International Movie Awards	Best Actress – Malayalam	Shamla Hamza	Nominated		
2025	14th South Indian International Movie Awards	Best Debut Director – Malayalam	Fasil Muhammed	Won		
