= Theeppori Benny =

2023 Indian Malayalam comedy film

- Poster
- Directed by: Rajeesh Mohan; Joji Thomas
- Written by: Rajeesh Mohan; Joji Thomas
- Produced by: Shebin Backer
- Starring: Arjun Ashokan; Femina George; Jagadish; T. G. Ravi
- Cinematography: Ajay Francis George
- Edited by: Sooraj E. S.
- Music by: Sreerag Saji
- Production company: Shebin Backer Productions
- Distributed by: Central Pictures; Phars Film (Overseas)
- Release date: 22 September 2023
- Running time: 122 minutes
- Country: India
- Language: Malayalam

Theeppori Benny (transl. Firebrand Benny) is a 2023 Indian Malayalam-language comedy drama film written and directed by Rajeesh Mohan and Joji Thomas. The film was produced by Shebin Backer under the banner of Shebin Backer Productions. The film stars Arjun Ashokan, Femina George, Jagadish, and Muhammed Rafi in lead roles.

The Principal photography of the film began in March 2023. The shooting took place in and around Thrissur and Kochi. The film was released on 22 September 2023.

== Synopsis ==
It revolves around the lives of Benny and his father Vattakuttayil Chettayi who is a selfless communist.

== Cast ==
- Arjun Ashokan as Vattakuttayil Benny (Theeppori Benny)
- Femina George as Ponnila
- Jagadish as Sakhavu Vattakuttayil Chettayi
- T. G. Ravi as Pappettan
- Santhosh Keezhattoor as Maramattam Varkey
- Shaju Shreedar as Manthan Baby
- Muhammed Rafi as Binu Mon
- Joby Pala as Priest
- Prem Prakash as Chief Minister
- Nisha Sarang as Gracy
- Srikant Murali as Shekharan
- Aswathy Sreekanth as Dincy
- Dayyana Hameed as Aparna
- Tony Jose as Kuttliveli Sojan
- Rajesh Paravoor as Tailor
- Sunil Melepuram as Teastall owner

== Production ==
The title of the film was officially announced on 18 March 2023.

=== Filming ===
The makers started the principal photography on 18 March 2023 with the switch-on ceremony and completed it on 24 April 2023. It took 37 days to complete the shoot. Much of the filming took place in and around Thrissur and Kochi. The post-production of the film started in May 2023.

== Music ==
The songs and background score are composed by Sreerag Saji.

== Release ==
=== Theatrical ===
The film was released on 22 September 2023.

== Reception ==
=== Critical reception ===
Gopika Is of The Times of India gave 3 out of 5 stars and wrote "Raajesh Mohan and Joji Thomas's Theeppori Benny is an attempt at delivering a quirky political satire along the lines of Vellimoonga, a comparison that cannot be helped given how the latter was clear about how the main character was not a conventional hero." Swathi P. Ajith of Onmanorama wrote "The film does incorporate subtle moments of humour, albeit not strong enough to evoke hearty laughter from the audience. Unfortunately, the movie's climax tends to follow a rather cliched path, where a slight political agenda becomes prominent, culminating in a dialogue delivered by Arjun Ashokan that ties things together." Arjun Ramachandran of The South First gave 3 out of 5 stars and wrote "Theeppori Benny is a light-hearted movie that deals with the father-son relationship. It also delves into local politics but fails to accommodate all stakeholders (political parties)."
