= Jyothirmayi =

Indian actress

- Born: Kottayam, Kerala, India
- Years active: 1999–2013; 2024–Present
- Spouses: Nishanth Kumar (m. 2004; div. 2011); Amal Neerad (m. 2015)
- Parent(s): Janardhanan, Saraswathi
- Relatives: C. R. Omanakuttan (father-in-law)

Jyothirmayi is an Indian actress, television presenter, and former model, who worked in Malayalam cinema. Starting her career as a model, she ventured into television, working as an anchor and later starring in numerous television shows. Post second marriage, she had been on a career break and as of 2024, she made a comeback through her husband Amal Neerad's film Bougainvillea.

== Career ==
Jyothirmayi started her career as a model and serial artist and gained recognition for her performance in the Malayalam soap opera, Indraneelam, directed by Suresh Krishnan. After a brief and unsuccessful stint acting in telefilms, she moved to feature films. In her first film Pilots (2000), she played a minor character and the film was a box office bomb. She was noticed after the release of Meesa Madhavan (2002) along with actor Dileep, in which she played the second female lead.

== Personal life ==
She married Nishanth Kumar on 6 September 2004. Six years later the couple filed for divorce, and it was granted on 1 October 2011. She married film director and cinematographer Amal Neerad on 4 April 2015. They have a son.

== Filmography ==
=== Film ===
- All films in Malayalam otherwise language noted

Year	Title	Role	Notes
2000	Pilots	Bobby's sister	
2001	Ishtam	Jyothi	
2002	Bhavam	Latha	Won - Kerala State Film Award for Second Best Actress; National Film Award (Special Mention)
2002	Meesa Madhavan	Prabha	
2002	Nandanam	Bride	Guest appearance
2002	Kalyanaraman	Radhika	
2003	Ente Veedu Appuvinteyum	Meera	
2003	Pattalam	Bhama	
2003	Anyar	Raziya Banu	
2003	Hariharan Pillai Happy Aanu	Kavya	
2004	Kathavasheshan	Renuka Menon	
2005	Alice in Wonderland	Dr. Sunitha Rajagopal	
2005	10 The Strangers	Sanjachala	Telugu film
2005	Sivalingam I.P.S.	Meera	Tamil film
2006	Chacko Randaaman	Meenakshi	
2006	Moonnamathoral	Bala	
2006	Bada Dosth	Meenu	
2006	Idhaya Thirudan	Herself	Tamil film, item number
2006	Thalai Nagaram	Divya	Tamil film
2006	Pakal	Celine	
2007	Sabari	Nandhini	Tamil film
2007	Naan Avanillai	Ammukutty Menon	Tamil film
2007	Periyar	Nagammal	Tamil film
2007	Aakasham	Bhanu	
2007	Ayur Rekha	Mallika	
2008	Arai En 305-il Kadavul	Buvana	Tamil film
2008	Atayalangal	Meenakshi	
2008	Twenty:20	Jyothi	
2008	Bandhu Balaga	Nisha	Kannada film
2009	Sagar Alias Jacky Reloaded	Dancer	Special appearance
2009	Bharya Swantham Suhruthu	Urmila	
2009	Vedigundu Murugesan	Nachiyar	Tamil film
2009	Kerala Cafe	Lalitha	segment Lalitham Hiranmayam
2010	Janakan	Dr. Rani Mathew	
2010	Chandala-bhikshuki	Matangi (chandala woman)	
2011	Seniors	Elsamma	
2011	Ven Shankhu Pol	Indhu Nandan	
2011	Pachuvum Kovalanum	Sneha	
2012	Navagatharkku Swagatham	Sreerekha	
2013	Housefull	Emily	
2013	Sthalam	Priya	
2013	Urava	Maathangi	
2024	Bougainvillea	Reethu / Esther Emmanuel	
2026	Bachelor Party D'eux	Paulie	

== Accolades ==
- Kerala State Film Award for Second Best Actress – Bhavam (2002)
- National Film Award (Special Mention) – Bhavam (2002)
- Kerala State Television Award for Best Actress – Avasthatarangal (2001)
- 55th Kerala State Film Awards - Special Mention - Bougainvillea (2024)
