= Am Ah =

Indian mystery thriller drama film

- Theatrical release poster
- Directed by: Thomas K. Sebastian
- Written by: Kaviprasad Gopinath
- Starring: Dileesh Pothan; Devadarshini
- Cinematography: Anishlal RS
- Edited by: Bijith Bala
- Music by: Gopi Sundar
- Production company: Kaapi Productions
- Release date: 24 January 2025 (India)
- Country: India
- Language: Malayalam

Am Ah is a 2025 Indian Malayalam-language mystery thriller drama directed by Thomas K. Sebastian. The film features Dileesh Pothan and Devadarshini (in her Malayalam debut) in the lead roles, with a supporting cast that includes Jaffar Idukki, Meera Vasudev, T. G. Ravi and Maala Parvathi. The screenplay was written by Kaviprasad Gopinath, and the film was produced under the banner of Kaapi Productions.

== Plot ==
Anju, a woman devastated by multiple miscarriages and unable to conceive after a medical complication, quietly copes with her loss. In the remote hill village of Kavantha, Stephen, a police officer working undercover as a roadwork inspector, arrives to investigate a missing child case. There, he meets Ammini Amma, a withdrawn woman raising a hearing-impaired child named Kunhi. Ammini claims she lost her daughter and son-in-law in the 2018 floods and has since cared for Kunhi. As Stephen delves deeper, he discovers that Kunhi was born through surrogacy and abandoned by her biological parents because of her hearing disability. Years ago, Ammini, who was living with Jincy, the surrogate mother and a local tailor, learned of Kunhi’s plight. When Jincy’s husband planned to sell the child, Kunhi was left alone on a doorstep, crying and vulnerable. Ammini bravely rescued Kunhi, crossing dangerous forest terrain and steep hills to secretly bring her to Kavantha. She supported them both through daily wage work and sent Kunhi to nursery. When Ammini’s heart failed, Kunhi was left alone again. In the end, Stephen and Anju adopt Kunhi, offering her love, care, and a fresh start.

== Cast ==
- Dileesh Pothan as Stephen/Eeppen
- Devadarshini as Ammini Amma
- Jaffar Idukki as Ward Member
- Meera Vasudev as Anju
- T. G. Ravi as Pappettan
- Sruthy Jayan as Jincy
- Alencier Ley Lopez as Abhraham, CI of Police
- Sneha Ajith as Silpa
- Maala Parvathi as Dr.Vineetha Varghese, Gynaecologist
- Muthumani as Sindhu V Menon
- Sarath Das as Cardiologist
- Navas Vallikkunnu as Subin Teastall owner

== Production ==
The film was produced by Kaapi Productions. Cinematography was handled by Anish Lal R.S., editing by Bijith Bala, and the musical score was composed by Gopi Sundar.

== Soundtrack ==
The music for Am Ah was composed by Gopi Sundar. Zeba Tommy Won the Kerala State Awards 2024 for Best Playback Singer for the Song “Aarorum”.

Track listing
No.	Title	Lyrics	Singer(s)	Length
1.	"Kavantha"	Engandiyoor Chandrasekharan	Adwaitha Padmakumar	3:18
2.	"Aarorum"	Rafeeq Ahamed	Zeba Tommy	4:24
3.	"Ithale Ponnithale"	Nidheesh Naderi	Leela Joseph	6:02
Total length:				13:44

== Release and reception ==
Am Ah was released in theaters on 24 January 2025. The movie has got mixed reviews from many major news platforms.

=== Reception ===
Gopika I. S. of The Times of India rated the film two-and-a-half out of five stars and wrote, "Overall, Am Ah had the ingredients for a compelling suspense drama but leaves much of its potential unexplored." Rohit Panikker of Times Now gave it two-and-a-half out of five stars and wrote, "Am Ah is a simple film with heart that tries to explore a few significant themes, but doesn't entirely do justice to it. An uncomplicated narrative, although it takes its own pace, is made more interesting with its side investigation angle."

Vivek Santhosh of The New Indian Express wrote, "Despite Devadarshini’s standout performance, Am Ah is ultimately a missed opportunity, weighed down by a script that can’t decide what it wants to be. There’s no real depth to the characters or the themes they represent, while it never fully commits to its own potential and thrives in mediocrity." Swathi P. Ajith of Onmanorama wrote, "The performances are solid, but they don’t quite reach exceptional levels. As mentioned earlier, the characters lack depth, leaving little room for the actors to deliver truly impactful performances. The story weaves an emotional thread tied to the mystery, but it doesn’t quite reach a satisfying conclusion."
