= Udumbanchola Vision =

2026 Indian Malayalam language film

- Directed by: Salam Bukhari
- Written by: Alan Rodney
- Produced by: Asher Ameer; Riyas K. Muhammed
- Starring: Mathew Thomas; Sreenath Bhasi; Dileesh Pothan; Sudev Nair
- Cinematography: Vishnu Thandassery
- Edited by: Vivek Harshan
- Music by: Gopi Sundar
- Production companies: A & R Media Labs; UB Productions
- Release date: 23 October 2026
- Country: India
- Language: Malayalam

Udumbanchola Vision is a 2026 Indian Malayalam language thriller movie directed by Salam Bukhari and starring Mathew Thomas in the lead role.

== Development ==
Udumbanchola Vision is directed by Salam Bukhari. This is the independent directorial debut of Salam Bukhari, who has worked as an associate director for Anwar Rasheed. The film, with a screenplay by Alan Rodney, is produced by Asher Ameer and Riyas K. Muhammed under the banners of A & R Media Labs and UB Productions. Vishnu Thandassery handled the cinematography and Vivek Harshan the editing for this film, while Gopi Sundar composed the music.

== Plot ==
Set in Udumbanchola in Idukki district of Kerala, the film portrays the power dynamics and rivalries within the media world. The central character is a young man named Mithun, played by Mathew Thomas, who works as a photographer's assistant in Udumbanchola. While he takes charge of Udumbanchola Vision News, a defunct local news channel that lost its momentum after the death of journalist Zachariya.

Mithun tries to transform the local television channel started by Zacharia into a major media network competing for ratings and breaking news, but he finds himself in conflict with another corporate media owner, Umar, and criminal gangs. When a fake news broadcast by Umar's channel to boost ratings ruins the life of a young woman, Mithun and his team start a 'media war' against it through their channel. The plot of this film is about Mithun's investigations towards Umar's media network, and the unexpected developments that follow.

== Cast ==
- Mathew Thomas as Mithun
- Sreenath Bhasi as Zacharia
- Dileesh Pothan as George
- Sudev Nair as Omar Wasim

== Music ==
Gopi Sundar composed the music and background score of the movie. The wedding party track composed by Gopi Sundar, written by Vinayak Sasikumar and sung by rapper Dabzee was released on May 4, 2025.

== Release ==
The audio launch of Udumbanchola Vision, was held in Kochi in May 2025. The film was released in theatres in October 23, 2026.

== Reception ==
Princy Alexander of Onmanorama praised Mathew Thomas's performance and the film's exploration of media ethics but criticised its far-fetched plot developments and uneven storytelling. Malayala Manorama's Jithan praised the performances of Mathew, Dileesh Pothan, Sudev Nair, and Sreenath Bhasi, but feels that many of the other characters have not received enough screen time or proper depth.

The Indian Express’s Anandu Suresh gave Udumbanchola Vision 1/5, criticising its incoherent screenplay, superficial characterisation and poor direction despite its potential to explore media disinformation. The writing and filming of Udumbanchola Vision have been done in a way that will appeal to the new generation, but there are doubts about how much it will satisfy the generation that has seen notable journalistic films in Malayalam like New Delhi, says Ashwini P of the Times of India.
