= Balan: The Boy =

2026 Indian film by Chidambaram

- Theatrical release poster
- Directed by: Chidambaram S. Poduval
- Written by: Jithu Madhavan
- Produced by: Venkat K. Narayana; Shailaja Desai Fenn
- Starring: Adhisheshan K. R. Farzana Palathingal; Muhammad Zinaan; Tovino Thomas; Girish A. D. Jean Paul Lal
- Cinematography: Shyju Khalid
- Edited by: Vivek Harshan
- Music by: Sushin Shyam
- Production companies: KVN Productions; Thespian Films
- Distributed by: see below
- Release date: 19 June 2026 (India)
- Running time: 150 minutes
- Country: India
- Language: Malayalam
- Box office: ₹33.54 crore

Balan: The Boy is a 2026 Indian Malayalam-language Psychological mystery crime drama thriller film directed by Chidambaram S. Poduval and written by Jithu Madhavan. The film stars Farzana Palathingal, Adhisheshan K. R. and Muhammed Zinaan in the lead roles, alongside Jean Paul Lal and Tovino Thomas. Produced under the KVN Productions banner, the film features music by Sushin Shyam, cinematography by Shyju Khalid and editing by Vivek Harshan, and was shot predominantly in Wayanad, Kerala.

== Plot summary ==
After leaving prison, a mother and her young son move from place to place, using different names to hide their past. She works several jobs, but they move whenever someone becomes too curious about her life. While working as a home care worker, she is found by a woman who had protected her in prison. When the woman begins threatening her, the mother kills her and switches herself with a mentally unstable woman whose identity she took.

That evening, the mother fails to pick up her son from school. Sensing something is wrong, the boy throws away his school uniform and stops speaking. The police take him into custody, but he escapes and reaches a coastal village in Karnataka. A thief takes him in, includes him in his craft, and hopes to reunite him with his mother, believing she is back in prison.

Years later, the boy returns to the area and recognizes places from his childhood. While searching for his mother, he discovers that the woman everyone believed to be his mother was actually someone else. His real mother had been living nearby as a ragpicker, hoping to see him again. After years apart, they finally reunite.

== Cast ==
- Adhisheshan K. R. as Balan (Younger)
  - Muhammad Zinaan as Balan (Older)
- Farzana Palathingal as Amma
- Jean Paul Lal as CPO/SI Pavithran K. S.
- Dolly June as Ammama
- Girish A. D. as CI Francis
- Tovino Thomas as Abbas
- Beena Antony as Shamnatha
- Babu Annur as Tea shop owner Sudheeran
- Sandra Chandran as Cicily
- Archana Padmini as Sherly
- Rachit Goyal as Ammama's Grandson (voiced by Jinu Joseph)
- Irina as Grandson’s wife
- Achuthanandan as Head Constable Soman
- Anand Ekarshi as Lorry Driver
- Athira Gopinath as Jail superintendent
- Sathyan Kavil as Petitioner
- Jolly Antony as Contractor
- Thampu Wilson as School Teacher
- Muhammed Maqbul Mansoor as Antique shop owner
- Ivanshika Prathyush as Balan's classmate
- Padmaja Ajith Kumar as Beedi factory owner
- Sajin Ali as Rubber plantation owner
- Akhil Raj as Police officer at grandmother's home
- Parvathy Menon as Girija
- Lisamma as Mother (Nun) at candle factory
- Riya Alex as Sister (Nun) at candle factory
- Rafeeq Parakandi as Butcher
- Purushu as theatre owner
- Prayan A. S. as Vasudev
- Haris Mannancheril as Police officer at the Prawn factory
- Praveen Pillai as School Peon
- Gundukadu Sabu as George
- Vinod as Office staff at mental hospital
- P. Gopinathan as Prabhakaran
- Ajith Gopi as Ajith Gopi
- Fardhad N. V. as fancy store owner
- Abhishek Nair as Iype
- Rajesh K. Bandyood as Ubaid
- Pinky Rani as Akka
- Thimmappa Kulal as Bar Owner

== Music ==
The background score and songs were composed by Sushin Shyam, except "Makane Makane", which was composed by Shanka Tribe and Neha Nair. All songs were written by Anwar Ali.

Track listing
| No. | Title | Singer(s) | Length |
|---|---|---|---|
| 1. | "Thaakkol" | Nila Raj | 02:07 |
| 2. | "Engotta" | Sushin Shyam | 03:23 |
| 3. | "Makane Makane" | Shanka Tribe & Neha Nair | 03:46 |
| Total length: | | | 09:17 |

== Production ==
=== Development ===
After the success of Manjummel Boys (2024), director Chidambaram would collaborate with Jithu Madhavan, who is writer of the film, announced the new project on 2 January 2025, in his third directorial venture after Jan.E.Man (2021) and Manjummel Boys. The film is produced by Venkat K. Narayana under KVN Productions and Shailaja Desai Fenn under Thespian Films, marketing their first production in Malayalam cinema. The film's title was announced on 19 August 2025.

=== Pre-production ===
The film reunited Chidambaram with several members of the Manjummel Boys technical crew, including cinematographer Shyju Khalid, music composer Sushin Shyam, editor Vivek Harshan and production designer Ajayan Chalissery. Ganapathi S. Poduval served as executive producer and casting director.

=== Filming ===
Principal photography began with a pooja ceremony at Kovalam on 20 August 2025. The filming wrapped on 6 December 2025. The film is shot in various location Kunduvadi near Pulpalli–Chekadi Road at Wayanad, Mangaluru.

== Release ==
=== Theatrical ===
Balan: The Boy was released on 19 June 2026 in theatres worldwide. Apart from Malayalam, it was dubbed and released in Hindi, Telugu, Tamil and Kannada languages.

=== Distribution ===
Pen Marudhar acquired the theatrical distribution rights for North India. Annapurna Studios acquired the theatrical distribution rights for Andhra Pradesh and Telangana, while Phars Film acquired the worldwide theatrical distribution rights.

=== Home media ===
The post-theatrical were reportedly acquired by ZEE5. The film started streaming from 31 July, 2026.

== Reception ==
=== Critical response ===
Balan - The Boy received critical acclaim from critics. Anandu Suresh of The Indian Express rated the film 3 out of 5 and wrote that the survival drama "impresses in first half, but stumbles in second", while adding that the film belonged "entirely to Farzana Palathingal".

Anna Mathews of The Times of India gave the film 3 out of 5, praising its "captivating" first half, layered storytelling and Adhisheshan K. R.'s performance, but criticised the muted emotional build up and called the ending "somewhat underwhelming".

Latha Srinivasan of NDTV also rated the film 3 out of 5, describing it as "a survival drama that impresses for the most part". She praised the mother son characterisation and performances, while noting that the film's slow and unconventional style could disappoint viewers expecting a commercial entertainer.

Vignesh Madhu of The New Indian Express rated the film 3.5 out of 5 and called it "an unusually haunting ode to motherhood". He praised Farzana Palathingal's performance and wrote that the film was smaller in scale than Chidambaram's previous film Manjummel Boys, but had "a far bigger heart".

Early audience response was reported as generally favourable. The Times of India stated that the film received "encouraging responses on social media after the first shows", with viewers praising its measured pacing, emotional intensity, performances and technical aspects.
