= Ashiq Usman =

Indian film producer and actor (born 1986)

- Born: 17 April 1986 (age 40); Ernakulam, India
- Education: Cochin University of Science and Technology
- Occupations: Film producer; actor
- Years active: 1998 (child artist), 2012–present
- Spouse: Khadeeja Ashraf (m. 2014)
- Children: 2

Ashiq Usman is an Indian film producer and actor who works in Malayalam films. He also acted in Malayalam films as a child artist. He launched Ashiq Usman Productions in 2012, As a producer his debut was Arikil Oraal, which starred Indrajith Sukumaran, Remya Nambeesan, and Nivin Pauly. He was the producer of the blockbuster movie Anjaam Pathiraa, starring Kunchacko Boban. He is remaking the Malayalam movie Anjaam Pathiraa in Hindi language in association with Reliance Entertainment. His latest movie to hit theaters is Thallumaala starring Tovino Thomas and directed by Khalid Rahman.

== Early life ==
He was born at Ernakulam on 17 April 1986 at Ernakulam, India. He completed his secondary schooling at Seventh Day Adventist Higher Secondary School and passed senior secondary from Sacred Heart Thevara. He graduated from CUSAT. He married Khadeeja Ashraf in 2014 and they have two children together.

== Filmography ==
| Year | Title | Director | Ref. |
|---|---|---|---|
| 2013 | Arikil Oraal | Sunil Ibrahim | |
| 2014 | Happy Journey | Boban Samuel | |
| 2015 | Chandrettan Evideya | Sidharth Bharathan | |
| 2016 | Kali | Sameer Thahir | |
| 2017 | Shajahanum Pareekuttiyum | Boban Samuel | |
| 2017 | Varnyathil Aashanka | Sidharth Bharathan | |
| 2019 | Argentina Fans Kaattoorkadavu | Midhun Manuel Thomas | |
| 2019 | Allu Ramendran | Bilahari | |
| 2020 | Anjaam Pathiraa | Midhun Manuel Thomas | |
| 2020 | Love | Khalid Rahman | |
| 2022 | Dear Friend | Vineeth Kumar | |
| 2022 | Thallumaala | Khalid Rahman | |
| 2023 | Ayalvaashi | Irshad Parari | |
| 2024 | Thundu | Riyas Shereef | |
| 2024 | Adios Amigo | Nahas Nazar | |
| 2025 | Bromance | Arun D. Jose | |
| 2025 | Odum Kuthira Chaadum Kuthira | Althaf Salim | |
| 2026 | Mollywood Times | Abhinav Sunder Nayak | |
| 2026 | Athimanoharam † | Tharun Moorthy | |
