= KVN Productions =

Indian film studio

- Type: Private
- Industry: Entertainment
- Founded: 2020
- Founder: Venkat K. Narayana
- Headquarters: Bengaluru, Karnataka, India
- Products: Film
- Services: Film production Film distribution
- Subsidiaries: KVN Properties
- Website: www.kvnproductions.co.in

KVN Productions is an Indian film production and distribution company based in Bengaluru, Karnataka. Founded in 2020 by entrepreneur Venkat K. Narayana, the studio produces and distributes feature films across major Indian language industries, including Kannada, Tamil, Telugu, Hindi and Malayalam.

The company functions as an integrated media studio, handling financing, creative development, and theatrical distribution. Beyond its home market in Karnataka, the studio expanded its scale in the mid-2020s through high-profile multilingual co-productions and regional distribution rights for pan-Indian cinema releases.

== History ==
The company's first production was Kannada film Sakath, directed by Simple Suni, released in November 2021. This was followed by Bytwo Love (2022). Then they produced Cult which was released in January 2026. KD: The Devil is their fourth Kannada film which was directed by Prem. It was released in theatres on 30 April 2026. It received negative reviews and failed at box office.

Balan: The Boy is the first Malayalam-language production by the company. It released on 19 June 2026 to critical acclaim and became a commercial success.

Jana Nayagan is the first Tamil-language production by the company. After getting delayed for over 6 months, the film released on 23 July 2026. It received mixed reviews and failed at the box office.

Toxic is their first Kannada-English bilingual film, directed by Geetu Mohandas and starring an ensemble cast consisting of Yash, Nayanthara, Kiara Advani, Rukmini Vasanth, Huma Qureshi, and Tara Sutaria. It was jointly produced with Yash's Monster Mind Creations. It was released on 26 August 2026. It received negative reviews and massively failed at the box office.

Haiwaan is the first Hindi-language production by the company. It released on 11 September 2026 to mixed reviews and was a massive box office disaster.

== Filmography ==
Key
†	Denotes films that have not yet been released

=== Film productions ===
Year	Title	Director	Language	Notes
2021	Sakath	Suni	Kannada	
2022	By Two Love	Hari Santhosh	Kannada	
2026	Cult	Anil Kumar	Kannada	Co-produced with Loki Cinemas
2026	KD: The Devil	Prem	Kannada	
2026	Balan: The Boy	Chidambaram S. Poduval	Malayalam	Co-produced with Thespian Films
2026	Jana Nayagan	H. Vinoth	Tamil	
2026	Toxic	Geetu Mohandas	Kannada; English	Co-produced with Monster Mind Creations LLP
2026	Haiwaan	Priyadarshan	Hindi	Co-produced with Thespian Films
2026	Bail	Pawan Wadeyar	Kannada	
2027	Kaaka †	Bobby Kolli	Telugu	
2027	Mangala Gowri †	Rahul PK	Kannada	Co-produced with Dakshayani Films

=== Distribution ===
Year	Title	Language	Notes	Ref.
2021	Pogaru	Kannada		
2022	By Two Love	Kannada	Also Producer	
2022	RRR	Telugu	Karnataka only	
2022	Sita Ramam	Telugu	Karnataka only	
2022	Gaalipata 2	Kannada		
2022	Anni Manchi Sakunamule	Telugu	Karnataka only	
2023	Sapta Saagaradaache Ello: Side A	Kannada		
2023	Sapta Saagaradaache Ello: Side B	Kannada		
2023	Animal	Hindi	Karnataka only	
2024	Kalki 2898 AD	Telugu	Karnataka only	
2024	Krishnam Pranaya Sakhi	Kannada		
2024	Thangalaan	Tamil	Karnataka only	
2024	Devara: Part 1	Telugu	Karnataka only	
2024	Kanguva	Tamil	Karnataka only	
2024	Sorgavaasal	Tamil	Karnataka only	
2024	UI	Kannada		
2025	Good Bad Ugly	Tamil	Karnataka only	
2026	Rakkasapuradhol	Kannada	Karnataka only	
2026	Love Mocktail 3	Kannada		
2026	Karuppu	Tamil	Karnataka only	
2026	Balaramana Dinagalu	Kannada		
2026	Nagabandham: The Secret Treasure	Telugu	Karnataka only	
2026	Moda Kavida Vaatavarna	Kannada		
2026	Jana Nayagan	Tamil	Karnataka only, Also Producer	
2026	Toxic	Kannada; English	Karnataka only, Also Producer, Distributed with Monster Mind Creation, Bilingual film	
2026	Mookuthi Amman 2	Tamil		
