= Roy (2022 film) =

2022 Indian Malayalam-language psychological thriller film

- Directed by: Sunil Ibrahim
- Written by: Sunil Ibrahim
- Produced by: Sajeesh Manjeri, Sanoob K. Yusaf
- Starring: Suraj Venjaramoodu, Sija Rose, Shine Tom Chacko, Jins Baskar
- Cinematography: Jayesh Mohan
- Edited by: V. Sajan
- Music by: P. M. Munna
- Production company: Vibezon Movies
- Distributed by: SonyLIV
- Release date: 9 December 2022
- Running time: 126 minutes
- Country: India
- Language: Malayalam

Roy is a 2022 Indian Malayalam-language psychological thriller film written and directed by Sunil Ibrahim. The film stars Suraj Venjaramoodu in the title role, alongside Sija Rose, Shine Tom Chacko, and Jins Baskar. It was released directly on the streaming platform SonyLIV on 9 December 2022, without a theatrical release.

== Plot ==
Roy is a man disturbed by recurring and vivid dreams that increasingly affect his waking life. As he struggles to understand the meaning of these visions, his wife Teena goes missing after acting on clues that appear to originate from Roy’s dreams. A police investigation is launched, during which Roy’s psychological state becomes central to uncovering the truth. The film explores the blurred boundaries between dreams, reality, guilt, and perception.

== Cast ==
- Suraj Venjaramoodu as Roy
- Sija Rose as Teena
- Shine Tom Chacko as CI Ajith Easwar
- Jins Baskar as SI Asif Ahmed
- V. K. Sreeraman as Rajagopal

== Production ==
Roy was written and directed by Sunil Ibrahim. Dialogues were written by Sunil Ibrahim and M. R. Vibin. The film was produced by Sajeesh Manjeri and Sanoob K. Yusaf under the banner Vibezon Movies. Cinematography was handled by Jayesh Mohan, editing by V. Sajan, and music was composed by P. M. Munna.

== Music ==
The film’s soundtrack and background score were composed by P. M. Munna. Songs from the film, including "Arikin Arikil" and "Kanvaathil", were released through official YouTube channels.

== Release ==
Roy was released exclusively on SonyLIV on 9 December 2022, without a theatrical release. The film was certified 13+ by the Central Board of Film Certification.

== Reception ==
Roy received mixed reviews from critics.

Manorama Online described the film as a psychological thriller experiment and noted its conceptual ambition and performances.

Madhyamam highlighted the film’s exploration of the boundary between dreams and reality.

Samayam Malayalam gave a mixed review, describing it as a psychological mystery with moderate narrative impact.

OTTPlay criticised the film’s pacing and execution while acknowledging its premise.
