= Aarsha Chandini Baiju =

Indian actress

Aarsha Baiju
- Born: Aarsha Chandini Baiju; 8 November 2000 (age 25); Mannar, Kerala, India
- Occupation: Actress
- Years active: 2019–present

Aarsha Chandini Baiju (born 8 November 2000) is an Indian actress and classical dancer who works primarily in Malayalam and Tamil cinema. After making her acting debut with the film Pathinettam Padi (2019), she has since starred in the Karikku Fliq miniseries Average Ambili (2021), Mukundan Unni Associates (2022) and House Mates (2025) as the female lead.

== Early life ==
Aarsha was born on 8 November 2000, in Mannar, Alappuzha, to Baiju Pillai and Chandini N. S. in a family of educators. After schooling, she completed her Bachelor's in English literature from Kristu Jyoti College of Management and Technology and subsequently pursued a master's degree at St. Aloysius College, Edathua.

She trained in classical dance from childhood and participated in cultural competitions during her school and college years. She secured grade A in Mahatma Gandhi University Youth Festival in 2018.

== Career ==
Aarsha first appeared in a brief role in the Malayalam film Pathinettam Padi in 2019, which marked the directorial debut of scenarist-actor Shankar Ramakrishnan.

In 2021, she played the title role in the miniseries Average Ambili, produced by Karikku Fliq. She gained attention for her portrayal of an average student who tries to fight her way through the patriarchal society. Film critic Arya U.R of The New Indian Express wrote that "Arsha's acting, where she would speak volumes with a glance or smirk, is one of the most striking elements of Average Ambili". The miniseries which was released on YouTube, received great responses on social media for its unusual storyline.

The following year, Aarsha appeared as the female lead in editor-turned-director Abhinav Sundar Nayak's debut film Mukundan Unni Associates, co-starring Vineeth Sreenivasan, Suraj Venjaramood, Sudhi Koppa and Tanvi Ram. The film was commercially and critically successful. Vignesh Madhu of Cinema Express commented that "It is rare for mainstream female actors to get roles that shatter stereotypes, and Aarsha lapped up the opportunity with both hands."

Aarsha also starred in costume designer Stephy Zaviour's debut film Madhura Manohara Moham and Qurbaani co-starring Shane Nigam.

In 2025, she appeared in the film Thudarum, which was a commercial success. She later said the film's success brought her wider recognition among the family audiences. The same year, she made her Tamil debut with the film House Mates. In his review for The Hindu, Bhuvanesh Chandar wrote that "the ever-impressive Aarsha Chandini Baiju shines in her Tamil debut".

Aarsha appeared in Don Palathara's Ekadesham (The Uncertainity Principle), portraying a character in a complicated relationship with an aspring film director. In an interview with Anoushka Kundu of Indulge Express, she described the character as complex with many shades of grey, and said this attracted her to the role.

== Filmography ==
=== Films ===
Key
| † | Denotes films that have not yet been released |

| Year | Title | Role | Language | Notes | Ref. |
|---|---|---|---|---|---|
| 2019 | Pathinettam Padi | Devi | Malayalam | Film Debut | |
| 2022 | Mukundan Unni Associates | Meenakshi | Malayalam | | |
| 2023 | Madhura Manohara Moham | Salabha | Malayalam | | |
| 2023 | Ramachandra Boss & Co | Jessy Thomas | Malayalam | | |
| 2023 | Family | Bride | Malayalam | | |
| 2025 | Thudarum | Mary | Malayalam | | |
| 2025 | House Mates | Anu | Tamil | Tamil debut | |
| 2026 | Mollywood Times | Neethu | Malayalam | Cameo | |
| 2026 | Pluto | Meera | Malayalam | | |
| 2026 | Ekadesham | | Malayalam | | |
| 2026 | Mayan - Chapter 1 | | Malayalam | | |
| TBA | Qurbaani † | | Malayalam | | |
| TBA | Mugai † | Malar | Tamil | | |

=== Web series ===
| Year | Title | Role | Platform | Notes | Ref. |
|---|---|---|---|---|---|
| 2021 | Average Ambili | Ambili | Karikku fliq | Web Debut | |

=== Music videos ===
| Year | Title | Singer(s) | Ref. |
|---|---|---|---|
| 2017 | Meenakshi | Aswin P S | |
| 2021 | Ever After | Zeba Tommy | |
