= ED: Extra Decent =

Indian dark comedy thriller film

- Theatrical release poster
- Directed by: Aamir Pallikkal
- Written by: Ashif Kakkodi
- Produced by: Listin Stephen; Suraj Venjaramoodu
- Starring: Suraj Venjaramoodu; Grace Antony; Shyam Mohan; Sudheer Karamana; Vinaya Prasad
- Cinematography: Sharon Sreenivas
- Edited by: Sreejith Sarang
- Music by: Ankit Menon
- Production companies: Magic Frames; Vilasini Cinemas
- Distributed by: Magic Frames
- Release date: 20 December 2024
- Country: India
- Language: Malayalam

ED: Extra Decent (subtitled at the end as ED: Extremely Dangerous) is a 2024 Malayalam-language dark comedy drama film directed by Aamir Pallikkal. featuring Suraj Venjaramoodu, Grace Antony, Shyam Mohan, Sudheer Karamana and Vinaya Prasad in lead roles

== Plot ==
The film opens with Binu being hit by his apartment security guard. The guard, who is fed up with his life with unsupportive children, is desperate for some food and shelter without working and wants to go to jail. To achieve this he hits Binu, who ends up in the hospital in a coma. On waking up, he has retrograded amnesia and cannot remember anything in his immediate past. Once he is admitted to hospital, Das, his mother Lakshmi, Nishima and his friend Sanju rush to the hospital. They appear very frantic over some undisclosed issue and are seen huddling together and discussing what to do next. Dr. Rupesh who is treating Binu, decides to bring his old friend from abroad to try and cure Binu's amnesia. At this point, Binu's family open up to their flatmate Dr. Ajmal Khan about the whole fiasco.

Binu has mental health issues and been affected since his childhood, from the time he witnessed the accidental death of his elder brother Shibin whom he loved very much and looked up to. Shibin had to be admitted to a hospital for 3 months because of his burn injury after which he succumbed. Das always shames him for his incompetence in studies and insults him in front of everyone, but Lakshmi supports him. When Nishima gets ready to relocate to the US for a job, Binu notices her year of birth in her passport. Binu who clearly remembers his brother's death date, starts calculating and relating Nishima's birthdate with his brother's death date and concludes that his parents were involved in a physical relationship during the time of his brother's 3-month hospital stay, after which she was born. This incident, together with his father's attitude towards him, triggers him to be a Psycho. He belittles his parents to have been thinking about sex when their child was in the hospital and breaks things around the house. After that, Binu starts taking control of the household gradually and makes them relocate to a city apartment from their village house.

Once they settle into their apartment, Binu makes life miserable for his parents by enforcing strict exercise, control over phone, fasting during certain days and starts interfering in their freedom every way possible. He starts blackmailing them that he will divulge the secret to his sister if they don't listen to him. His parents bring Nishima back and plan to get her married to Sanju, whom she was in love with in college but Binu foils the marriage by deliberately humiliating Sanju's parents during the engagement talks. Left with no choice, Nishima must leave the house and marry Sanju.

At this point in the story, Binu loses his memory. Seeing this as an opportunity, his parents decide not to help him regain it, hoping the amnesia will keep him from returning to his former ways. Meanwhile, they secretly plot to kill their own son and stage the death to look like a suicide. Under the advice of Lakshmi's old colleague Sanandan, they discharge him from hospital and take him on a pilgrimage on Mookambika, using that time to entirely revamp the apartment to a new look so that Binu doesn't gain his memories back up on coming back to familiar environments. Once they are back to the completely changed apartment, Binu finds his old chewing gum that he had stuck under his bed, which sparks his mind and brings back all his old memories.

Pretending to be under his amnesic self, Binu offers to drive Nishima and Sanju to the airport on their way back and forcibly takes along his parents, Sanandan and Dr. Ajmal in the car as well. He drives them around like a manic and while revealing his true face, he purposefully crashes the car.

Everyone survives the crash and is shown to be admitted to the hospital, ambiguously ending the movie about the fate of the characters hinting a sequel (ED - Extremely Dangerous).

== Cast ==
- Suraj Venjaramoodu as Binu Das
  - Sathik as Young Binu
- Grace Antony as Nishima Das
- Shyam Mohan as Sanju
- Sudheer Karamana as Manoj Das
- Vinaya Prasad as Lakshmi Das
- Rafi as Dr Ajmal Khan
- Vineeth Thattil David as Sanandan
- Sajin Cherukayil as Dr Rupesh
- Alexander Prasanth as Shibu
- Rakesh Ushar as Bimanath
- Shaju Sreedhar as US Dr
- Saji Venjaramoodu
- Suryakiran as Shibin Das
- Dilna Ramakrishnan as Neelima
- Priya Sreejith as Nurse
- Sincy Anil as Nurse

== Production ==
The film is produced by Listin Stephen and Suraj Venjaramoodu under the banner of Magic Frames, in association with Vilasini Cinemas.

== Soundtrack ==
=== Music by ===
- Ankit Menon
- Arcado
- Ashley Milred
- Electronic Kili

No.	Title	Lyrics	Music	Singer(s)	Length
1.	"Machinmele"	Muthu	Ankit Menon, Electronic Kili, Arcado	Electronic Kili, Farsin Sidhu	02:33
2.	"Psycho"	Melvin	Arcado, Ashley Milred	Melvin	03:07

== Release ==
=== Theatrical ===
The film released in theatres on 20 December 2024 to positive reviews.

=== Home media ===
The digital streaming rights of the film is acquired by Saina Play and it startes streaming soon April 26, 2025.

== Reception ==
Athira M of The Hindu wrote:"A quirky drama powered by a brilliant Suraj Venjaramoodu". Sreejith Mullapally of Cinema Express rated 2.5 out of 5 stars and wrote:"An inconsistent dark comedy with an in-form Suraj Venjaramoodu". Sanjith Sidhardhan of OTTPlay rated the film 3/5 stars and wrote:"Suraj Venjaramoodu's dark comedy had promise but falters due to inconsistent writing".
