= Cult (2026 Kannada film) =

2026 Indian Kannada-language film

- Theatrical release poster
- Directed by: Anil Kumar
- Written by: Jadesh K Hampi
- Produced by: K. S. Suraj Gowda; K. V. Sathyaprakash
- Starring: Zaid Khan; Rachita Ram; Malaika Vasupal
- Cinematography: Jagadish Wali
- Edited by: K. M. Prakash
- Music by: Arjun Janya
- Production companies: Loki Cinemas; KVN Productions
- Release date: 23 January 2026
- Country: India
- Language: Kannada

Cult is a 2026 Indian Kannada-language action drama film written and directed by Anil Kumar, and produced by Loki Cinemas in association with KVN Productions. It features Zaid Khan, Rachita Ram and Malaika Vasupal in the lead roles. Cinematography is by Jagadish Wali, editing by K. M. Prakash, and music composed by Arjun Janya.

The film was officially announced in April 2024 and the pre-production phase and casting began thereafter. It was released on 23 January 2026.

== Plot ==
Madhava, known as Maddy, is introduced in Manipal as a college dropout drifting through days of drinking and erratic behaviour, his friend DJ Joy repeatedly cleaning up after him. His bitterness toward love is rooted in a village‑days romance with Geetha: the film intercuts his present rut with flashbacks to their adolescent courtship and promises before both leave for higher studies—he to Manipal, she to Bengaluru. Contact grows difficult; when Maddy eventually finds her, Geetha has embraced a different city life and moved on, which shatters him and sends him deeper into self‑destruction. Maddy’s cigarettes marked with Geetha’s name—underline an obsession he cannot shake, while his father’s restrained presence signals a home that cannot rescue him from his spiral.

A chance meeting with Ithihasini (Ithi) pivots the narrative from grievance to tentative repair. As Maddy and Ithi cross paths in the city, the film gradually reveals Ithi’s own history—her close bond with her father, a Hampi guide, and a private trauma that she carries without melodrama. Their relationship develops cautiously; Ithi’s steadiness helps Maddy confront his anger and the small‑town ideals he has weaponised against a changing world. When Maddy is forced to reckon with Geetha’s choices and the man he has become since losing her, the story narrows to whether he will remain trapped in resentment or accept a future shaped by accountability and empathy.

== Cast ==
- Zaid Khan as Madhava
- Rachita Ram as Ithi
- Malaika Vasupal as Geetha
- Rangayana Raghu
- Achyuth Kumar
- Kishan Bilagali

== Music ==
The soundtrack and background score is composed by Arjun Janya, with lyrics contributed by Anil Kumar and others. The first single, "Ayyo Shivane", was released on 10 September 2025 across major streaming platforms and Anand Audio's official YouTube channel. The single, written by director Anil Kumar and sung by Jaskaran Singh and Prithvi Bhatt, was released during the film's promotions in 2025.

Track listing
No.	Title	Lyrics	Singer(s)	Length
1.	"Ayyo Shivane"	Anil Kumar	Jaskaran Singh, Prithwi Bhat	4:32
2.	"Bloody Love"	Anil Kumar	Chandan Shetty	4:20
3.	"Hrudayavu Kelade"	Anil Kumar	Darshan Melavanki, Lahari Mahesh	4:40
4.	"Pathos song"	Anil Kumar; Nishan Rai (English lyrics)	Nishan Rai	5:41

== Release ==
=== Home media ===
Cult Kannada Movie Telecast in Television on July 26th 3:pm in Colors Kannada

== Reception ==
A Sharadhaa of The New Indian Express said that "It captures the confusion of first love, the bitterness of betrayal, and the gradual loss of trust with authentic realism." Vivek M.V. of The Hindu said "Cult opens on a deliberately unsettling note, introducing its protagonist in a state of physical and emotional ruin — and in doing so leans into outdated depictions of heartbreak that equate male suffering with bitterness toward women, making its portrayal of love and gender more regressive than reflective."
