= Shyam Mohan =

Indian actor

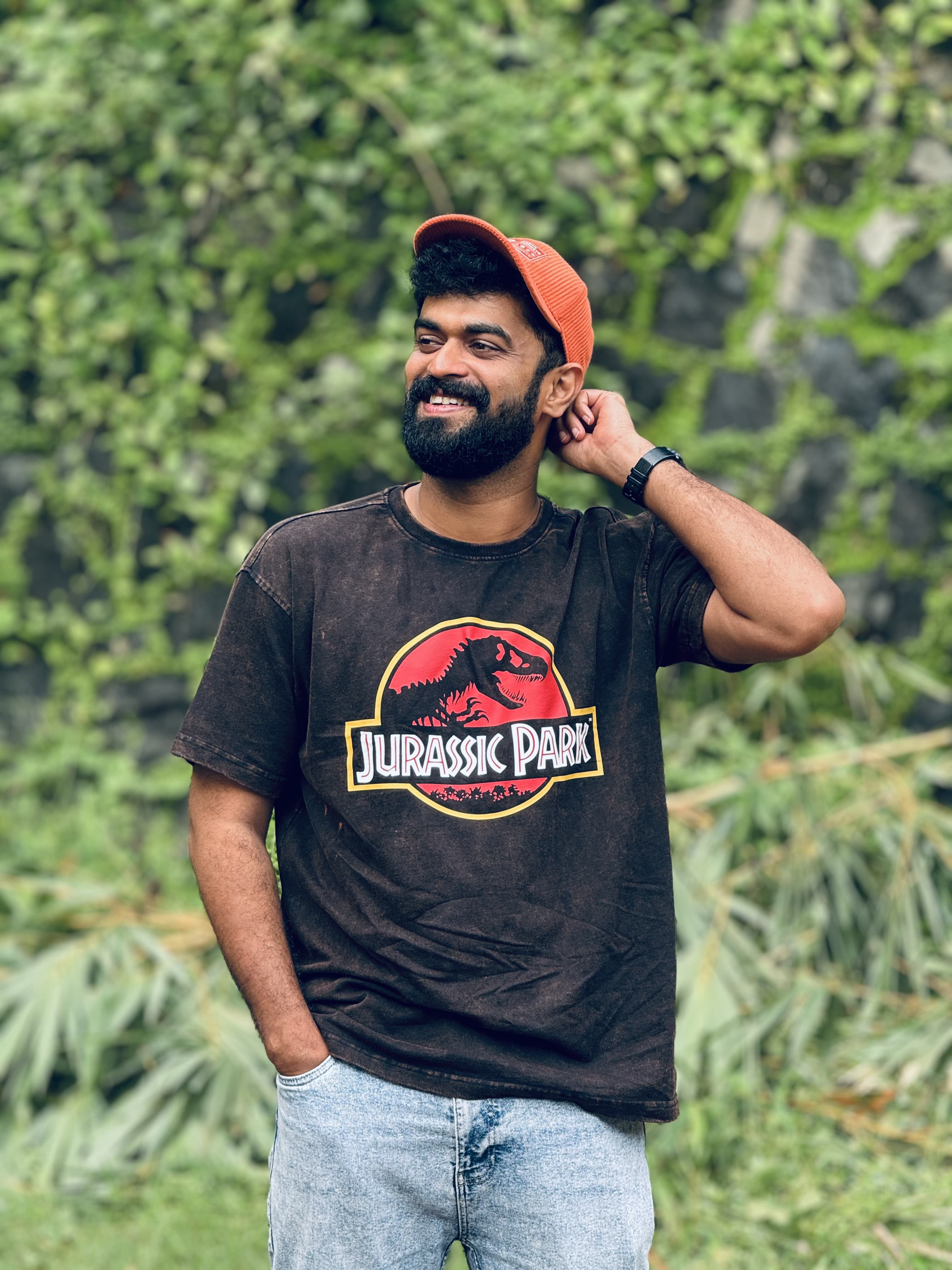
- Born: Trivandrum, India
- Occupation: Actor
- Years active: 2020–present
- Spouse: Gopika Mohan B (m. 2022)

Shyam Mohan is an Indian actor known for his work in the Malayalam film industry. He achieved a career breakthrough with his role in the film Premalu (2024). He is also known for his appearances in other prominent movies, including Amaran (2024), Bromance (2025), The Pet Detective (2025), and Bethlehem Kudumba Unit (2026).

== Career ==
Shyam Mohan made his debut as a child actor in the popular Malayalam movie Kilukkam (1991), where he appeared alongside his mother. Despite starting in the industry at a young age, he initially pursued a career in banking before transitioning to acting full-time in 2015.

One of Shyam Mohan's notable roles was in the 2024 movie Premalu, where he portrayed the character Aadhi. Film director S. S. Rajamouli cited Aadhi as his favourite character and was appreciative of his "JK" (just kidding) hand gesture.

In 2026, Shyam Mohan played Hari, an eccentric chakyar artist in Bethlehem Kudumba Unit , directed by Girish.A.D. His performance was noted in reviews of the film, with the Times of India highlighting his contribution to the latter half of the film, while Manorama singled out a comic reference involving his character.

== Personal life ==
Shyam Mohan married Gopika in 2023.

== Filmography ==
Key
†	Denotes films that have not yet been released

- All films are in Malayalam unless noted otherwise.

Year	Title	Role	Notes	Ref.
1991	Kilukkam	Unnamed	Child artist; uncredited	
2022	Pathrosinte Padappukal	Arun		
2022	Heaven	Sumesh Chandran		
2023	Journey of Love 18+	Arjun		
2024	Premalu	Aadhi		
2024	Nunakkuzhi	Vineeth		
2024	Amaran	Deepak "Deepu" Varghese	Tamil film	
2024	Extra Decent	Sanju		
2025	Bromance	Shinto Varghese		
2025	Get-Set Baby	Dr. Ranjith Karunakaran		
2025	The Pet Detective	Thinkal Thomas		
2026	Bethlehem Kudumba Unit	Hari		

=== Television ===
Year	Title	Role	Platform	Ref.
2020	Ponmutta		YouTube	

== Accolades ==
Year	Award	Category	Film	Result	Ref
2024	Mazhavil Entertainment Awards	Upcoming Actor	Premalu	Won	
2025	13th South Indian International Movie Awards	SIIMA Award for Best Comedian – Malayalam	Premalu	Won	
