= Abhinav Sunder Nayak =

Indian film director & editor

- Born: Kozhikode, Kerala, India
- Occupations: Film director; editor

Abhinav Sunder Nayak is an Indian film director and editor. He has worked in Malayalam and Tamil language films. He is best known for directing, co-writing & co-editing the Malayalam film Mukundan Unni Associates.

== Early life ==
A native of Kozhikode, Abhinav attended Kendriya Vidyalaya before graduating in Visual Communication from Dr G R Damodaran College of Science, Coimbatore.

== Career ==
Abhinav edited and directed several short films before serving as an assistant director to Vineeth Sreenivasan for the Malayalam film Thira (2013). His feature film debut came with Tamil-Malayalam bilingual Vaayai Moodi Pesavum (2014), as the editor. The film, which was Dulquer Salmaan's first Tamil release, received positive reviews and was a success.

He subsequently went on to work as the editor in Malayalam and Tamil films including You too Brutus (2015), Uriyadi (2016), Aanandam (2016), Kurangu Bommai (2017) and Godha (2017).

Aside from editing, he has cut the trailers for numerous films, notably Thira (2013), Oru Vadakkan Selfie (2015), Kunjiramayanam (2015), Jacobinte Swargarajyam (2016), Njandukalude Naattil Oridavela (2017) and Aravindante Athidhikal (2018).

In 2022, he made his film directorial debut with Mukundan Unni Associates. He also co-wrote and co-edited the film with Vimal Gopalakrishnan and Nidhin Raj Arol respectively. The film starred his longtime collaborator Vineeth Sreenivasan, as the lead with a supporting cast of Suraj Venjaramoodu, Aarsha Chandini Baiju, Sudhi Koppa and Tanvi Ram. It premiered on 11 November 2022, to a positive response from audiences and critics alike and was a moderate box-office success. Princy Alexander of OnManorama wrote "Mukundan Unni is delightfully deceptive.The director and writer Abhinav Sunder Nayak and co-writer Vimal Gopalakrishnan have to be credited." Jose K George of The Week praised the film, saying "It is refreshing to see filmmakers not falling into the trap of shouldering the moral responsibility to make a movie the monolith of morality."

In 2023, Abhinav expressed his interest in developing a sequel to Mukundan Unni Associates. In May 2024, he announced his next film, Mollywood Times, with a quirky tagline - 'A hate letter to cinema', produced by Aashiq Usman.

== Filmography ==
=== Films ===
Year	Title	Notes	Ref.
2022	Mukundan Unni Associates	Debut film The first installment of Success trilogy	
2026	Mollywood Times	The second installment of Success trilogy	

=== Editor ===
Year	Title	Notes	Ref.
2014	Vaayai Moodi Pesavum	Tamil-Malayalam bilingual film	
2014	Samsaaram Aarogyathinu Haanikaram	Tamil-Malayalam bilingual film	
2015	You Too Brutus		
2016	Uriyadi	Tamil film	
2016	Aanandam		
2017	Godha		
2017	Kurangu Bommai	Tamil film	
2022	Mukundan Unni Associates	Also director and writer	
2025	The Pet Detective		
2026	Mollywood Times	Also director and writer	

=== Short films ===
Year	Title	Credited as	
Year	Title	Editor	Writer
2017	Touch	Yes	No
2015	Raah	Yes	No
2013	Ghazal (The Music of Redemption)	Yes	No
2013	Muktibodh	Yes	No
2013	Kuttimaa	Yes	No
2012	Dharmam	Yes	No
2012	Inbox	Yes	No
2012	Karai	Yes	No
2011	Unakkagavey Piranthaen	Yes	No
2011	Cat Story	Yes	Yes
2011	Oorukku 4 Peru	Yes	No
2010	Maranthittiya	Yes	No
2010	Status Updated	Yes	Yes
2008	Kuppi	Yes	Yes
