= Njan Marykutty =

2018 film directed by Ranjith Sankar

- Theatrical release poster
- Directed by: Ranjith Sankar
- Screenplay by: Ranjith Sankar
- Produced by: Ranjith Sankar; Jayasurya
- Starring: Jayasurya; Jewel Mary; Aju Varghese; Innocent
- Cinematography: Vishnu Narayanan
- Edited by: V. Saajan
- Music by: Anand Madhusoodanan
- Production company: Dreams N Beyond
- Distributed by: Punyalaa
- Release date: 15 June 2018
- Running time: 126 minutes
- Country: India
- Language: Malayalam

Njan Marykutty (transl. I am Marykutty) is a 2018 Indian Malayalam-language drama film written and directed by Ranjith Sankar and co-produced with Jayasurya. The film stars Jayasurya as a trans woman named Marykutty, with Innocent, Jewel Mary, Jins Baskar, Suraj Venjaramoodu, Aju Varghese and Joju George in other prominent roles. The music for the film was composed by Anand Madhusoodhanan. The film was released on 15 June 2018 on the eve of Eid.

== Theme ==
Marykutty, a transgender woman, strives to embrace her true identity in a society that stigmatizes gender transformation. Will she triumph against the societal taboos surrounding transgender individuals and the prejudices linked to gender-affirming surgery?

The film aims to educate the audience on various issues faced by transgender people, highlighting the distinction between being transgender and undergoing surgery to align with one's gender identity. It portrays the emotional and physical trauma experienced by transgender individuals and their families, inflicted by societal and governmental oppression. Through its narrative, the film sheds light on the challenges and resilience of the transgender community.

== Plot ==
Mathukutty, assigned male at birth, undergoes sex reassignment surgery and becomes Marykutty, a transgender woman. She leaves her job in Chennai and returns to her hometown. While her father and sister disown her due to her sexuality, her mother continues to support her. Marykutty lives with her friend Jovi and Jovi's child, Tanu. Determined to set an example in society, she aspires to become a sub-inspector and joins a coaching institute to prepare for the exam. Despite being mistreated by her peers daily, she perseveres and also joins the church's radio programme, eventually becoming the host of the show "Jingle" under the name RJ Angel.

One day, while traveling with her colleague RJ Alwin Henry, they encounter S.I. Kunjippalu, a corrupt police officer who demands a bribe. When Marykutty questions his actions, she is mistreated by the officers, leading to a conflict between her and Kunjippalu.

Marykutty rises to fame as a radio jockey in her town, with her program becoming a significant success. However, her application to the Kerala Public Service Union is rejected due to a lack of gender-related certificates. One night, while fulfilling Tanu's wish to buy Al-Faham chicken, Marykutty is harassed by a group of youngsters. SI Kunjipallu intervenes, taking her to the station and humiliating her. Her father visits the station and urges her to leave. Devastated, Marykutty is eventually released with the help of a church father, but her reputation is tarnished by negative portrayals in the local newspapers.

After this, Marykutty moves to a church-run home, where she tutors children. She visits her mother one day, unaware that her sister's engagement ceremony is taking place. Her father and sister disown her, introducing her as an "Unknown" to the guests. Despite being hurt, Marykutty leaves with a smile, telling her mother they will accept her one day. Leveraging her fame as RJ Angel, she befriends the District Collector, who helps her with her application and offers support.

With firm determination, Marykutty diligently prepares for her exam, successfully passing both the written and physical tests. When SI Kunjipallu threatens to defame her, she bravely asserts that "the world is for the talented, not just for men or women." Marykutty assures her sister's fiancé that she will not interfere in their lives and promises to give her share to her sister.

During her interview for the sub-inspector position, Marykutty states her desire to set an example and successfully achieves her goal. In the end, Marykutty is shown as a police officer, returning to the police station, her home, and the church radio station, where she proudly introduces herself as the new guest, "I am Marykutty."

== Cast ==
- Jayasurya as Marykutty/Mathukutty
  - Adwaith Jayasurya as young Mathukutty
- Jewel Mary as Jovi
- Aju Varghese as RJ Alwin Henry
- Jins Baskar as Sabu
- Suraj Venjaramoodu as Manoj Vaidhyanadhan
- Joju George as S.I Kunjippalu
- Innocent as Chacko, the local priest
- V. K. Baiju
- Shivaji Guruvayoor as Charles, Marykutty's father
- Shobha Mohan as Alice, Marykutty's mother
- Malavika Menon as Annie

== Production ==
Jayasurya agreed to collaborate with film director Ranjith Sankar in March 2018, for the project titled Njan Marykutty. This film marks their fifth collaboration. Filming began in Muvattupuzha on 17 March 2018.

According to an interview given by the team, originally they thought of making a comedy film. As other trans movies with comedy, or sympathy theme already exist, later the plan was changed to create a movie with a positive message. Hence the character is someone who succeeded in life against all the odds. Also to avoid common pattern of long hair for trans characters in many movies, short hair was chosen in this movie. Additionally makeup man Ronex Xavier used less makeup for Jayasurya's character, and certain shot were taken without any makeup at all. As preparation for movie Jayasurya pierced his ear, dieted to put on weight, and stopped his normal daily workout programs. Jayasurya also learnt to drape a saree within 4 minutes for the shooting of the film.

Jayasurya revealed that his role as a transgender woman was the most difficult character that he ever played in his career and also revealed that he wanted to play the character to change the aspects and mindsets of the society that it generally thinks upon the transgender people. The costume designs for the film were designed by Jayasurya's wife Saritha and the trans woman getup of Jayasurya was used by his wife Saritha to display as the model for the promotion of Saritha's costume design boutique. Ranjith later revealed that he was inspired by transsexual actress Anjali Ameer to make a transgender-related film.

== Release ==
The film had its theatrical release on 15 June 2018 in Kerala and a week later in rest of India. It was released in the Middle East on 5 July 2018. The posters of the film displayed in the United Arab Emirates screenings featured a faceless Jayasurya as the UAE government prohibits sex assignment surgery in the country. The film was also tagged adult only and no promotions of the film were allowed in the country. According to Sankar, there were other restrictions as well.

== Reception ==
The Times of India rated the film 3 out of 5 stars and lauded the performance of Jayasurya for his role as a transgender woman in the film stating that this is a fine effort to portray the respect and dignity of transgender people through the versatile acting of Jayasurya. The Hindu newspaper gave positive reviews to the film for handling the troubles and challenges of a trans person with sensitivity.

Deccan Chronicle rated 4 out of 5 stars and said "Njan Marykutty stands out for the fine way the lead character Marykutty has been scripted by director Ranjith Sankar and interpreted by actor Jayasurya". International Business Times wrote "for the first time in the history of Mollywood, a transgender character has been portrayed with dignity and respect". Although he said there are some unrealistic moment it is forgettable for Sankar's good intention.

Baradwaj Rangan of Film Companion South wrote "A finely tuned Jayasurya performance carries a black-and-white tale of a transgender who wants to become a cop "

== Accolades ==
- 2019: Kerala State Film Award for Best Actor – Jayasurya
- 2019: Kerala State Film Award for Best Makeup Artist - Ronex Xavior

== Music ==
Anand Madhusoodhanan composed the music, who collaborated with Jayasurya and Sankar for the third time. Lyrics were written by Santhosh Varma.

1. Doore Doore - Biju Narayanan
2. Cherupulliyuduppitta Poompaatta - Nidhin P. K.
3. Ennullil Ennum Nee Maathram - Sithara Krishnakumar
4. Kaanaa Kadalaasilaaro - Sithara Krishnakumar
5. Oru Kochu Kumbilaanennaakilum - Nidhin P. K.
6. Penninullil Priya Mohangalkku - Nithin P. K.
7. Thirakalethire Vannalum - Vineeth Sreenivasan
8. Uyaraan Padaraan - Nidhin P. K
