= Arikil Oraal =

- Directed by: Sunil Ibrahim
- Written by: Sunil Ibrahim
- Produced by: Ashiq Usman
- Starring: Indrajith Sukumaran; Nivin Pauly; Remya Nambeeshan; Prathap Pothen; Lena
- Cinematography: Krish Kymal
- Edited by: V. Saajan
- Music by: Gopi Sunder
- Production company: Milestone Cinemas
- Release date: 30 August 2013
- Country: India
- Language: Malayalam

Arikil Oraal (English: Someone In The Distance) is a 2013 Malayalam psychological thriller film scripted and directed by Sunil Ibrahim. The central character played by Indrajith Sukumaran is a creative ad director, Siddharth, with Nivin Pauly as Ichcha a waiter at a cafe and Remya Nambeesan as a trained dancer Veena. Supporting roles are played by Prathap Pothen as a psychologist and Lena as the head of a corporation. The movie is following Indrajith's character. The cinematography was by Krish Kymal, and the music was scored by Gopi Sunder. Arikil Oraal was produced by Ashiq Usman under the banner of Milestone Cinemas. The film started shooting in April 2013 in Kochi. The film released on 30 August 2013. It was equally praised by both critics as well as audiences. The movie was further noticed during its DVD release. Sunil Ibrahim was appreciated for his raw film-making style and strong characterizations.

== Plot ==
Sidharth is the creative head of a prominent advertising agency. He has just been transferred to Kochi from Bangalore. Veena is Siddhu's girlfriend and runs a contemporary dance troupe. Icha is Veena's friend and a waiter in an upmarket coffee shop. When they fail to find a suitable place for Siddhu to stay, Veena suggests that he share Icha's place until he finds his own accommodation. Siddhu instantly agrees, but Icha agrees reluctantly. Soon Siddharth and his girlfriend Veena find themselves caught in a horrific riddle - they find Icha at two different places at the same time. Their search for answers forms the crux of the story.

== Cast ==
- Indrajith as Siddharth
- Nivin Pauly as Icha
- Remya Nambeesan as Veena
- Prathap Pothen as Sudhir Bose
- Lena as Aarathi
- Shaalin Zoya as Gayathri
- Riya Saira as Helen
- Shine Tom Chacko as Alfred
- Dharmajan Bolgatty
- Sajid Yahiya as Manu
- Bindu Ramakrishnan
- Poojitha Menon

== Music ==
Gopi Sunder composed the music. Actors Indrajith Sukumaran and Remya Nambeesan sang one song each along with Chithra Iyyer, and Shreya Raghav.

=== Track list ===
No	Title	Singers	Length
1	"Kanavil Kanavil"	Remya Nambeesan	03:44
2	"Hey Ithuvazhi"	Indrajith Sukumaran & Chithra Iyyer	03:58
3	"Kanavinum"	Gopi Sunder & Shreya Raghav	

== Reception ==
The movie was met with positive reviews, gaining further popularity on the release of its DVD.

- Aswin J. Kumar of The Times of India praised the movie stating that "The beauty of Arikil Oraal lies in the way director Sunil Ibrahim whips up moments one after another - apparently without any purpose - and later assigning definite motive to each of them. In fact some of the scenes appear completely purposeless in the beginning and Sunil, riding on a riveting narrative, gives a leisurely treatment to his story. Arikil Oraal is jolting and probing at the same time and sheer enigma of its narrative poses multiple answers for the riddle that makes the film."
- Neil Xavier of yentha.com says that "Arikil Oral may leave you with a fear in your heart and Sunil Ibrahim has done a fantastic job with his second film."
- Rajeevan Francis of metromatinee.com stated that "The narrative has been woven with detail and precision so as not to let the suspense slip, the suspense becomes so unbearable that the viewers are fully transported. The climax is very thrilling and additional twists reveal unexpected aspects, though a glimmer of suspicion assails the viewer towards the end. And the two songs including the contemporary dance are situational and gave much more color to the cinema. In the march of family and romantic films in the Malayalam Film Industry which are usually the norm, this film will stand out for its exploration of the psyche, visualizing an altogether different genre. Direction is the major positive thing in the movie. Also the background score and music by Gopi Sunder is titillating and creates the suspense mood without reverting to tired and tested horror genre music. All the characters have been etched with care and the actors have shown full justice to the characters. The cream of the cake goes definitely to Nivin Pauly and Indrajith. Nivin Pauly has successfully traversed a road less traveled through this movie, which has a brilliant scope for emoting compared to his past movies. And it's not a new thing for Indrajith to do a performance oriented role and like everytime he has done it well. Viewers who love the magic of cinema must definitely watch this movie. Arikil Oraal is a psychological thriller. This movie is a clean entertainer. I promise you won't look at your watch even once."

== Remake ==
Sunil Ibrahim announced that he would be remaking Arikil Oraal in Tamil and that it would be different from the Malayalam version with only the main premise being similar in both.
