= Olappeeppi =

Olapeeppi
- Official poster
- Directed by: Krish Kymal
- Written by: Krish Kymal
- Produced by: Sunil Ibrahim
- Starring: Biju Menon
- Edited by: V. Saajan
- Music by: Anil Johnson
- Production company: Vibezon Movies
- Distributed by: Eros International
- Release date: 30 September 2016
- Running time: 123 minutes
- Country: India
- Language: Malayalam
- Budget: ₹1.50 crore

Olappeeppi is a 2016 Indian Malayalam periodic family-drama film written and directed by Krish Kymal (in his directorial debut) and produced by Sunil Ibrahim under the production house, Vibezon Movies. The film stars Biju Menon, Paris Laxmi, Reina Maria, and Sreejith Ravi. Olappeeppi was released on 30 September 2016, by Eros International.

== Synopsis ==
The story is set in Kerala in the 1970s, in the backdrop of various socio-economic changes that prevailed in the state during the execution of the Land Reform Act in 1977. The story focuses on the turmoil created in an upper class feudal family due to the Land Reform Act.

== Cast ==
- Punasseri Kanchana as Muthassi
- Biju Menon
- Paris Laxmi
- Reina Maria
- Sreejith Ravi
- Jebbar Chemad
- Kanchana
- Anjali Nair
- Master Dev

== Soundtrack ==
Olappeeppi features one song, "Ela Pulayelo", composed by Anil Johnson and sung by Jayakrishnan R., Fathimathul Liyana, Chinmayi S. Nath, and Shreya S. Ajith. The 3 minute 15 seconds long song was released on 3 September 2016 by Eros Music.

== Release ==
Olappeeppi, earlier scheduled to release on 23 September 2016, by Eros International, was rescheduled and released on 30 September 2016.

== Awards ==
- Kerala State Film Award for Best Character Actress - Kanchana P. K.
