= Mollywood Times =

2026 film by Abhinav Sunder Nayak

- Theatrical release poster
- Directed by: Abhinav Sunder Nayak
- Written by: Ramu Sunil
- Produced by: Ashiq Usman
- Starring: Naslen
- Narrated by: Naslen; Vineeth Sreenivasan
- Cinematography: Viswajith Odukkathil
- Edited by: Nidhin Raj Arol; Abhinav Sunder Nayak
- Music by: Jakes Bejoy
- Production company: Ashiq Usman Productions
- Distributed by: Central Pictures; AP International; Home Screen Entertainment
- Release date: 5 June 2026
- Running time: 167 minutes
- Country: India
- Language: Malayalam
- Box office: ₹19.50 crore

Mollywood Times is a 2026 Indian Malayalam-language psychological dark comedy film directed by Abhinav Sunder Nayak and written by Ramu Sunil. The film stars Naslen as an aspiring filmmaker, who wants his debut film to be remembered forever, but has to address several problems throughout the journey. The cast also includes Roshan Shanavas, Sangeeth Prathap and Sharaf U Dheen.

Mollywood Times was released on 5 June 2026 in theatres worldwide and received positive reviews from critics with huge praise for Naslen’s performance.

== Plot ==
Sachin, the young son of celebrated Malayalam horror novelist Vaikom David, attempts suicide out of feelings of inadequacy. David stops him by confessing a dark secret: his entire literary legacy is built on plagiarising the unpublished manuscripts of his late lover, Anuradha, sustained by a network of ghostwriters. David instills in Sachin the cynical belief that a manufactured reputation outweighs the truth. Meanwhile, Peter, one of David's ghostwriters, exposes this fraud in a novel titled Devil's Island. David systematically destroys nearly every copy, but one survives in the possession of a young aspiring filmmaker, Vineeth Madhavan.

Vineeth dreams of becoming a horror director despite the disapproval of his middle-class family. After his debut short film allegedly sends his rationalist grandfather into a coma, his father recognises his potential and Vineeth enters a prestigious short film contest. Though his entry is the crowd favourite, he loses the grand prize to the politically connected Arjun Haridas. Recognising Vineeth's talent, Sachin offers to back him in adapting one of the late David's novels. However, when Vineeth significantly alters the script, co-producers Fayaz and Harris Basheer withdraw. Frustrated—and after learning that Arjun plagiarised his short films for a feature starring his girlfriend, and Vineeth's former admirer, Hana—Vineeth abandons Sachin. He partners with Fayaz to direct Manushyan, starring superstar Swaroop. Disaster strikes when a competitor releases a near-identical film, followed by Swaroop's tragic death. Refusing to exploit the tragedy for box-office sympathy, Vineeth destroys the footage, resulting in a blacklisting.

To lift the ban, Vineeth trades a script to Arjun. Though Fayaz attempts to shadow-ban him, Harris steps in to produce Vineeth's next project. Meanwhile, after his grandfather's demise, Vineeth discovers that his grandfather's coma was actually induced by the shock of reading Devil's Island. Realizing the power of raw truth, Vineeth decides to adapt the expository novel. Sachin preemptively burns the final copy to protect his father's legacy, forcing Vineeth to write the screenplay from memory. The project, Nidhi, is set to star Hana, who is revealed to be Harris's sister and has broken up with Arjun. Seeking revenge, Arjun and Fayaz conspire to ruin Vineeth. Arjun manipulates Hana into marrying him and abandoning the production. Undeterred, Harris encourages Vineeth to recast and finish the film. Concurrently, Fayaz coerces Vineeth's working-class friend, Sujith, into directing a competing film, Yuddham.

Days before the release, Vineeth discovers Harris deliberately sabotaged Nidhi's marketing to use the film as a tax write-off. However, during the private premiere, Harris dies of a heart attack brought on by the film's terrifying climax, generating massive viral publicity that makes the movie a box-office phenomenon. In retaliation, Sachin publicly exposes a childhood book review written by his wife and frames him as a plagiarist, which sparks severe public backlash.

At a subsequent awards ceremony, Sujith's Yuddham sweeps the major categories, though Sujith privately laments that the industry values his underprivileged background over his actual artistry. Vineeth is handed the Best Debut Director award to a silent crowd. He delivers a scathing acceptance speech, exposing the systemic corruption of Sachin, David, Arjun, and Fayaz, and vows to continue making films on his own terms.

== Cast ==
- Naslen as Vineeth Madhavan
  - Abram Ratheesh as young Vineeth
- Sharaf U Dheen as Sachin Vaikom David
  - Sreejith Shine as young Sachin
- Vineeth Sreenivasan as Harris Basheer
- Sangeeth Prathap as Arjun Haridas
- Roshan Shanavas as Sujith Raj V. "Suji"
  - Arnav Vineeth as young Suji
- Althaf Salim as Sunil
- Gopika Ramesh as Hana Shahjahan
- Binu Pappu as Manjadi Venu
- Prasanth Alexander as K. Madhavan, Vineeth's father
- Meera Nair as Sujatha Parameshwaran, Vineeth's mother
- Jagadish as Vaikom David, Sachin's father
- Balachandran Chullikkad as C. K. Parameshwaran, Vineeth's grandfather
- Appunni Sasi as Fayaz Ahmed (Wox)
- Rajesh Hebbar as Doctor
- Chandu Salim Kumar as Meljo Davis
- Manikandan Pattambi as Production Controller
- Rajesh Madhavan as Anand Sudhakaran
- Sudheer Paravoor as Sujith's father
- Nandhini Gopalakrishnan as Sujith's mother
- Aarsha Chandini Baiju as Neethu, Sachin's wife
  - Aashvi Prajith as young Neethu
- Krishnadas Murali as Police Officer
- Srikanth Mohan as News Anchor
- Ashlee Issac as Fayaz’s Assistant
- Geethi Sangeetha as Physics Teacher
- Jishnu Mohan as News Reporter
- Viswajith Odukkathil as K. T. Peter

Archive footages of Divya Unni and Mayoori from the film Aakasha Ganga used in this film

Cameo appearances

- Basil Joseph as Superstar Swaroop
- Arun Kurian as Cameraman
- Vinayan as himself
- Vijayan Karanthoor as CI
- Biju Sopanam as Mathew Abhraham, member of Producers' Association

== Production ==
=== Development ===
The film was announced on 4 May 2024 through Instagram. The production officially began with a traditional Pooja ceremony held at Anchumana Devi Temple, Kochi on 14 July 2025.

=== Filming ===
Principal photography took place at Kuttikkanam, Vagamon of Idukki district, and Kochi.

== Music ==
Mollywood Times

Soundtrack album by Jakes Bejoy
- Released: May 2026
- Genre: Filmi
- Length: 21m 47s
- Label: Sony Music

The music is composed by Jakes Bejoy and the lyrics are penned by Vinayak Sasikumar and Adhri Joe.

Track listing
No.	Title	Lyrics	Singer(s)	Length
1.	"Apna Friday Aayega"	Vinayak Sasikumar	Sanjith Hegde	4:11
2.	"GOAT Song"	Adhri Joe	Adhri Joe, Jakes Bejoy, Tribemama Marykali	3:44
3.	"Mood Of Mollywood"	Adhri Joe	Adhri Joe, K. C. Balasarangan	3:37
4.	"Appuppan Song"	Adhri Joe	Adhri Joe	3:00
5.	"Vaadathe Kanne"	B. K. Harinarayanan	Evugin	3:14
6.	"Apna Friday Aayega (House Mix)"	Vinayak Sasikumar	Sanjith Hegde	4:01
Total length:				21:47

== Controversy ==
On June 18, the CBFC filed a case against the makers of Mollywood Times. Allegations were made by the officials of regional CBFC officials regarding certain scenes and dialogues which violated censorship guidelines. The case was filed against the film producer, director and distributors.

== Release ==
=== Theatrical release ===
The film was initially scheduled to be released in late 2025 but was delayed until 14 May 2026, and then to 5 June 2026. The film received a U/A 16+ certification from the Central Board of Film Certification.

=== Home media ===
The film's streaming and satellite rights have reportedly been acquired by JioHotstar and Asianet. The film started streaming on JioHotstar from 3 July 2026.

== Reception ==
Sreeju Sudhakaran of Rediff.com rated the film 4/5 stars and wrote, "If you enjoy dark comedies, have even a passing understanding of the film industry, or simply recognise the absurdities of the world around you, then Mollywood Times emerges as one of the sharpest and most compelling love-hate letters written to Malayalam cinema, applauds Sreeju Sudhakaran."

Sajin Shrijith of The Week rated the film 4/5 stars and wrote, "Just like his debut Mukundan Unni Associates, Abhinav Sunder Nayak's new film distinguishes itself with its strong cynical outlook and rich detail, setting it apart from more optimistic narratives about aspiring filmmakers."

Vivek Santhosh of The New Indian Express and Cinema Express rated the film 3.5/5 stars and wrote, "Powered by an outstanding Naslen at the centre, Abhinav Sunder Nayak's sprawling, unabashedly cynical take on cinematic aspirations offers an impressively provocative, if overstuffed, examination of how success often depends on far more than talent."

T. Maruthi Acharya of India Today rated the film 3.5/5 stars and wrote, "Mollywood Times movie review: Director Abhinav Sunder Nayak's Mollywood Times follows Vineeth Madhavan from cinephile boyhood to the bruising realities of filmmaking. The film turns that journey into a reflection on obsession, compromise and the dream of reaching Friday."

Anna Mathews of The Times of India rated the film 3/5 stars and wrote, "So the ideas are compelling, but the storytelling begins to feel muddled, particularly in the second half. The several hurdles that come in the way of Vineeth’s dreams are solely from Mollywood's peculiar manner of functioning and it gets tiresome. ... Also, the film strangely seems never-ending; you almost wonder if it might be as long as Dhurandhar! But while it could do with some major cutting at the writing stage, and sometimes the flow seems slow, the film travels along unpredictable paths and keeps the audience engaged and amused."

Vishal Menon of The Hollywood Reporter India described the film as an "inescapist cinema at its brutal best" and wrote, "Mollywood Times is a film that lives up to its tagline of being 'A Hate Letter To Cinema', and it's clearly the work of an eccentric filmmaker who finds a special reservoir of pleasure in pain."

S. R. Praveen of The Hindu wrote, "Marketed as a 'hate letter to cinema', Mollywood Times would have worked better as an exposé of the dark underbelly of the film industry if not for the stretched phases that make it a bloated work."

Swathi P. Ajith of Onmanorama wrote, "Mollywood Times is an earnest exploration of ambition and obsession within the world of filmmaking. It raises several interesting ideas and benefits greatly from Naslen's committed performance. Yet while the film has plenty on its mind, it never quite delivers the emotional and thematic impact its story seems to be aiming for. What remains is an engaging, well-acted drama that offers thoughtful observations about creative ambition, even if its most powerful moments ultimately stay just out of reach."

Anandu Suresh of The Indian Express rated 2.5 out of 5 stars and wrote "just as Vineeth Madhavan's (Naslen) obsession with becoming 'the best' filmmaker in his field leads to his downfall, Mollywood Times's obstinacy in being a one-of-a-kind film might have cost the dark comedy dearly, as its focus shifts solely to this mission after a point, overlooking its soul."

Latha Srinivasan of NDTV rated the film 2.5/5 stars and wrote, "Mollywood Times presents a philosophical look at the film industry and how ambitions alone are not enough to make you successful."

Sunny Singh of The Sunday Guardian wrote "Mollywood Times is an uncompromising, aggressively unique piece of filmmaking that takes enormous risks. It doesn't feature the flawless, airtight narrative continuity of Mukundan Unni Associates, and its darker, preachy tone means it won't be everyone's cup of tea."
