= Y (2017 film) =

- Directed by: Sunil Ibrahim
- Screenplay by: Sunil Ibrahim
- Produced by: Vibezon Movies
- Starring: Alencier Ley Lopez; Jins Baskar; Yahia Kader
- Cinematography: Jayesh Mohan
- Edited by: V.Saajan
- Music by: Promod Bhaskar (songs); Mejo Joseph (score)
- Release date: 17 November 2017
- Running time: 106 Mins
- Country: India
- Language: Malayalam

Y is a 2017 Indian Malayalam-language suspense-thriller film written and directed by Sunil Ibrahim. The film was released on 17 November 2017.

== Plot ==
Arun and Teena, a young couple, were walking down the street, laughing and clicking pictures when some auto-rickshaw drivers mocked them. A few minutes later, a few thugs take illicit photographs of Teena, which angers Arun, and he incites a fight. At Teena's request, Arun stops fighting and walks back while the thugs warn him that they will kidnap Teena in front of him. At the same time, a speeding van kidnaps Teena, taking her to a flat nearby where many prominent personalities live. A distraught Arun is unable to find her.

With the help of a few auto-rickshaw drivers, they find the flat but cannot go inside as the watchman does not allow them to enter, fearing that it will create chaos for the residents. They decide to call the police.

Meanwhile, in the flat, Mohan and his family, consisting of a wife and their daughter, are planning to move to Bangalore. Salim runs an illicit business and is desperate to make a thirty-crore rupee transaction with the help of a Goonda leader. While the Goonda cannot go down as a few other men are waiting for him down the road, he chit-chats with a woman working for Salim. Down the road, a police Sub-inspector questions Arun and others who witnessed Teena's kidnapping. The thugs are waiting for the Goonda leader, and two journalists are secretly watching the drama of the crime and reporting it. Arun does not disclose to the police the nature of his and Teena's relationship.

Salim calls the woman working for him and instructs her to release the Goonda leader as he is of no use anymore and to leave him to the thugs waiting for him down the road. In turn, Salim asks another guy, a friend of the Goonda to conduct the transaction on his behalf. He reluctantly accepts. Mohan and his family are packing bags and about to leave. While Arun is helplessly sitting, unable to do anything. The CCTV cameras are turned off on the instructions by Salim, which makes Teena unlocatable.

Later, Arun reveals that Teena is an online friend of Jeevan, an old police commissioner who has come to investigate the case. On his order, the police search the flats but find nothing.

After a few more hours, Mohan goes down the road and creates a scene that alarms the thugs, who promise him that they will find Teena, to locate the Goonda leader. Mohan, Arun, and the thugs forcefully enter the flat, pushing the watchman. The Sub-inspector witnesses the break-in but doesn't interfere, thinking it to be the only way to locate Teena.

The leader of the thugs waiting down meets the woman with The Goonda leader and apologizes to her as they cannot track the leader, which reveals that the woman was the one who ordered The thugs to beat and Kill The Goonda leader.

Arun finds Teena Unconscious in the basement. With the help of Mohan, Teena, and Arun, and gets into the car with SI and speeds toward Hospital.

Then the story is revealed. Teena, Arun, and Mohan, with the help of the woman who is Arun's sister has made this kidnapping plan. It was done to extract money from Salim, who has harassed them all at some point in their life. They have robbed the money, which is ploy as to teach Salim a lesson. The woman has hidden Teena in a room, and when all the people enter the flat, Arun finds the guy who was assigned to carry out the transaction unconscious, and robbed the money. Mohan Kept the Money in the bag and took the car. The woman reveals the plan to the Goonda leader, who finds that the thugs waiting for him are part of the plan.

They initially angered the SI but later learn that what they have done is right because they have just robbed the money, earned in illicit ways. The SI asks them to leave and happily calls his wife, walking down the road.

== Cast ==
- Alencier Ley Lopez as Sub-Inspector
- Dheeraj Denny as Arun
- Jins Baskar as Goonda leader in the flat
- Yahiya as Mohan
- Shini Ambalathodi as Mohan's wife
- Sruthi Susan Sam as Teena
- Reshma Shenoy as Arun's sister
- Justin Varghese as one of the local thugs
- Abhiram Suresh as Shaiju, an autorickshaw driver
- Anoop Ramesh as Pop
- Safeer Sait as the former Member of Parliament
- Rajagopalan P as Salim
- Khalfan as the Freak Boy
- Anand Manmadhan as Subhair
- Diljit Gore as Lawrence, the Facility Manager
- Abhiram Suresh Unnithan as Shaiju
- Gibin G Nair as Manu
- Rahul Nair as Benoy
- Asna as Mohan's daughter
- Santhosh Varghese as the Special Investigation Officer

== Production ==
The film was produced by Vibezon Movies and released on 17 November 2017. Shooting took place in March 2016, at a single location, Keston road, Thiruvananthapuram, over a 25-day (night) schedule, as the story unfolds predominantly during nighttime.

== Music ==
The songs were composed by Pramod Bhaskar and background score of the film was composed by Mejo Joseph respectively. The lyrics were penned by M R Vibin and the promo song was written by Lawrence Fernandez. The songs featured in the film are sung by Deepak, Prashanth Prabhakar, Sangeetha Anand, and Varsha S Nair. The soundtrack was officially released on 13 August 2018. The music for the Promo song was provided by Assan Nidheesh SD and sung by Sithara Krishnakumar and Abhilash Kallayam.

=== Tracks ===
- Ee Theruvil : Prasanth Prabhakar, Sangeetha Ananth
- Hey Thandanane : Sithara Krishnakumar, Abhilash Kallayam

== Release ==
The film was released on 17 November 2017 in 34 theaters across Kerala.

== Reviews ==
The Times of India reviewed the film with 3.5/5, as a "convincing thriller with a line-up of mostly fresh faces." The Deccan Chronicle rated it 3.5/5 noting the film was "A freshly brewed formula".
