= The Pet Detective =

2025 Indian Malayalam-language film

- Theatrical release poster
- Directed by: Praneesh Vijayan
- Written by: Praneesh Vijayan; Jai Vishnu
- Produced by: Gokulam Gopalan; Sharaf U Dheen
- Starring: Sharaf U Dheen; Anupama Parameswaran; Vinayakan; Vinay Forrt; Shyam Mohan; Joemon Jyothir
- Cinematography: Anend C. Chandran
- Edited by: Abhinav Sunder Nayak
- Music by: Rajesh Murugesan
- Production companies: Sharaf U Dheen Productions; Sree Gokulam Movies
- Distributed by: Sree Gokulam Movies
- Release date: 16 October 2025
- Running time: 116 minutes
- Country: India
- Language: Malayalam
- Box office: ₹17.05 crore

The Pet Detective is a 2025 Indian-Malayalam language action comedy film directed by Praneesh Vijayan, who co-wrote the screenplay with Jai Vishnu. The film stars Sharaf U Dheen in the lead role, also his debut as producer, along with Vinayakan, Vinay Forrt, Anupama Parameswaran, Shyam Mohan and Joemon Jyothir.

The Pet Detective was theatrically released on 16 October. The film was a commercial success at box office.

== Plot ==
Tony Jose Alula (Sharaf U Dheen), an inexperienced young man who inherits his father's failing private detective agency, tries to revive the business in hopes of impressing his childhood sweetheart Kaikeyi Menon (Anupama Parameswaran) and her disapproving father. Tony's first official case—locating a missing pet dog—seems simple but quickly spirals out of control.

During the investigation, Tony and his loyal assistant Sanoop (Joemon Jyothir) accidentally uncover a criminal racket involved in the smuggling of exotic aquatic species, including a rare and valuable fish. Their amateur detective work soon puts them at odds with both the smugglers and the police, particularly Rajath Menon (Vinay Forrt), a police officer and Tony's former classmate who also serves as his romantic rival.

As Tony digs deeper, the seemingly minor pet-tracking assignment evolves into a chaotic mix of kidnappings, mistaken identities, and a large criminal conspiracy. Despite frequent blunders and misjudgments, Tony becomes a key figure in exposing the operation. The case culminates in an action-packed, comedic showdown that brings the criminals to justice.

In the end, Tony earns newfound respect, wins back Kaikeyi's trust, and successfully re-establishes his father's detective agency—establishing himself as an unlikely yet determined pet detective.

== Cast ==
- Sharaf U Dheen as Pet detective Tony Jose Alula
- Anupama Parameswaran as Kaikeyi
- Vinay Forrt as Rajath Menon
- Vinayakan as Yaqat Ali
- Vijayaraghavan as Dilraj aka Peter Sambai
- Shyam Mohan as Thinkal Thomas
- Joemon Jyothir as Sanoop, Tony's assistant
- Amith Mohan Rajeshwari as Manikandan
- Bhagath Manuel as Maqbool
- Renji Panicker as Jose Alula, a retired Private detective
- Shobi Thilakan as Musthafa
- Nishanth Sagar as Shaji
- P.P. Kunhikrishnan as Jolsyan Panicker
- Jai Vishnu as Kattalan Suni
- Muthukumar as Kanaka Sabhavathy
- Praseetha Menon as Lolitha
- Sanju Madhu as Shamzu
- Jagadeesh Kumar as Jabru
- Sunny Wayne as Transformer Timmy Thomas, Thinkal's elder brother "TTT"(Cameo)
- Maala Parvathi as Seema Jose Alula
- Major Ravi as CKP Menon
- Jinu Joseph as Silva
- Althaf Salim as Rage Room Owner
- Amey Wagh as Psycho
- Sinoy Varghese as Joekuttan
- Aravind SK as Prakash
- Sirajudheen Nazar as Arnold
- Prithvi as Dia, Maqbool's daughter
- Nileen Sandra as Maqbool's wife & Dia's Mother
- Prasanth Madhavan as Maqbool's Friend
- Sonam Singh in an item number

== Production ==
=== Casting ===
The film was announced on 7 April 2024 through the Instagram page of Sharaf U Dheen Productions and The Pet Detective Movie. The cast with Sharaf U Dheen himself and Anupama Parameswaran was revealed on the same day.

=== Filming ===
Principal photography of the film was wrapped after 83 days, of shooting on 4 September 2024.

=== Marketing ===
A new poster was released on the lead actor's birthday. The film's production house announced a giveaway challenge of iPhone 17 as a part of promotion. The task was to take a screenshot from the song "Tharalitha Yaamam" and create an AI created retro styled image and tag them for participating on the giveaway. The winners should’ve been announced on its release date but was postponed to 26 October.

=== Certification ===
The film received a U certificatation from CBFC and a 12A viewing rights from BBFC with rating of moderate violence, threat, injury detail and implied strong language.

== Release ==
=== Theatrical ===
The film was initially planned to be released on 25 April 2025, but was postponed to 16 October 2025 due to clash release with Thudarum. Later it was released on limited screens in United Kingdom, Ireland, UAE, Saudi Arabia, Qatar, Oman, Kuwait and Bahrain on same dates.

=== Home media ===
The streaming rights for The Pet Detective were acquired by ZEE5. It started streaming from 28 November 2025.

== Reception ==
Ajith of Manorama Online gave a positive response, stating that "the film is an entertaining fun ride for the whole family, similar to films like C.I.D. Moosa". Vivek Santhosh of Cinema Express gave 3/5 stars, stating that "the film is very much chaotic, but an amusing comic caper" and "follows gleeful absurdity and slapstick rhythm of C.I.D. Moosa and Vettam, though not matching their flair, but funny enough to keep the audience engaged". Anjaidas NT of Mathrubhumi stated that "the film mixes action and comedy equally and gives us a chain comedy film, that was missing from Malayalam films for a long time", and that "the movie is a non stop laughter and guffaw ride, that entertain [sic] everyone". He concluded that "actor Sharaf U Dheen has now became the first choice for film makers, who tries action comedy films". SR Praveen of The Hindu reviewed the film as "a moderately funny template comic book caper, in a screenplay that has interesting bits of several characters brought in at various junctures, but each with a backstory". He concluded that "the high point of the film is the climax set in a theme park, where all characters gets gloriously mixed up, like a Priyadarshan film".
