= Kammattam =

- Genre: Crime thriller
- Based on: Real incident in Thrissur
- Written by: Shihabudeen k
- Directed by: Shan Thulasidharan
- Starring: Sudev Nair
- Country of origin: India
- Original language: Malayalam
- No. of seasons: 1
- No. of episodes: 6

Production
- Camera setup: Multi-camera
- Running time: 14 — 28 minutes

Original release
- Network: ZEE5
- Release: 4 September 2025

Kammattam is a 2025 Indian Malayalam-language crime thriller streaming television series directed by Shan Thulasidharan and starring Sudev Nair in the lead role. The series is produced for ZEE5 and is based on real events involving a large-scale financial scam in Thrissur.

== Plot ==
The series revolves around a shocking financial scam that unfolds in Thrissur. Sudev Nair plays the lead investigator who attempts to unravel the conspiracy and expose the truth behind the bank-linked crime.

== Cast ==
- Sudev Nair as Inspector Antonio George
- Jeo Baby as Samuel Oomen
- Akhil Kavalayoor as Sharath
- Sreerekha as Merikutty
- Arun Sol as Francis
- Jordi Poonjar as Perinad Pappan
- Ajay Vasudev as Shaji
- Jins Baskar as Ayyappadas
- Khalfan as Ebin Samuel
- Jicky Madathil as Esther
- B. Sunil Kumar as Praveen
- Ramya Sukumaran as Teena
- Raji R. Menon as Shyni
- Rekha Mathew as Kunjumol
- Sajan K. Mathew as Adv. Jayaprakash
- Manoj Kana as Raghuthaman
- R. V. Vasudevan as Forensic Surgeon
- Anil as DYSP
- Anoop Krishnan as Ortho Doctor
- Police Officers
  - Arun Viswam
  - Sugunan N. P.
  - Vaishak S.
  - Ratheesh S. G.
  - Sumesh Janaki
  - Unni Pazhookkara
  - Rafi
  - Vidheeshitha M. P.
- Sudheep Karat as Vijayanpillai
- Rakesh as Esther’s boyfriend
- Babu Joy as Sasikumar
- Femshad as Jameskutty
- Vipin Prakash as Registrar
- Ajayghosh as Satheesh
- Kashinath as Mobile Shop Owner
- Nikhil as Vibeesh
- Sujith Yeshu as Sajeevan
- Vinod Ernakulam as Photo Frame Guy
- Archana Jayakrishnan as Car Driving Lady
- Manooj Poonjaar as Kunjumol’s Neighbor

=== Cameo appearance ===
- Sai Kumar as Judge

== Production ==
Director Shan Thulasidharan revealed that Kammattam was inspired by a true financial scam that took place in Thrissur. The series was shot across 40 locations within just 11 days, a record pace for a Malayalam web series.

In interviews, the director mentioned that the team deliberately took risks in terms of fast-paced filming to maintain authenticity and realism.

== Release ==
Kammattam premiered on ZEE5 on 5 September 2025. The series was initially scheduled for 29 August but was postponed by a week.

The series has been described as ZEE5’s first Malayalam crime thriller series.

== Episodes ==
No.	Title	Time	Directed by	Written by	Release date
1	"Conspiracy"	28 min	Shan Thulasidharan	Sanjith RS; Sudheesh Sugunanandhan; Jose Thomas Polackal	4 September 2025
2	"Pursuit"	22 min	Shan Thulasidharan	Sanjith RS; Sudheesh Sugunanandhan; Jose Thomas Polackal	4 September 2025
3	"Forgery"	14 min	Shan Thulasidharan	Sanjith RS; Sudheesh Sugunanandhan; Jose Thomas Polackal	4 September 2025
4	"Exposure"	16 min	Shan Thulasidharan	Sanjith RS; Sudheesh Sugunanandhan; Jose Thomas Polackal	4 September 2025
5	"Vengeance"	15 min	Shan Thulasidharan	Sanjith RS; Sudheesh Sugunanandhan; Jose Thomas Polackal	4 September 2025
6	"Unraveled"	20 min	Shan Thulasidharan	Sanjith RS; Sudheesh Sugunanandhan; Jose Thomas Polackal	4 September 2025

== Reception ==
Kammattam received mixed to positive reviews from critics. Performances and technical aspects were praised, while its rushed pacing and writing drew criticism.

The Indian Express rated the series 1.5 out of 5, describing it as "unpolished" with underwhelming visuals and flawed writing. The review argued that the series "never truly manages to make use of its premise and ends up as yet another inflated crime thriller that tries too hard to appear sleek," though Jeo Baby’s performance as Samuel was highlighted as a positive.

Bhawana Tanmayi of Moneycontrol wrote that "Kammattam has all it needs to be a good movie: a strong central case, a talented ensemble, and inspiration from real-life crime. But it doesn't stand out in Malayalam's already great criminal thriller scene because the tale is rushed and not very deep. Fans of the genre will like it once, but it doesn't live up to the standards set by its predecessors."

Shilpa Nair Anand of The Hindu said, "Kammattam is interesting, the series has all the elements of a thriller, and it works, largely. But there is something lacking, is it the pace or rather the quickness of it? You could probably still watch it for Sudev Nair’s performance, at the very least."

Firstpost remarked that the series "scores due to its performances" and appreciated its technical finesse, but observed that it could have delved deeper into the complexities of its central crime.

The Times of India described it as "a fair police drama that’s worth a one-time watch," commending its cinematography and mystery setup, while noting that the narrative became confusing towards the end due to an overload of villains.

OTTPlay rated the series 2.5 out of 5, describing it as brisk and watchable but "abrupt." The review appreciated Sudev Nair and Jeo Baby’s performances but noted that the rushed 11-day shoot may have compromised narrative cohesion.

Trisha Bhattacharya of Mint wrote that "despite a promising setup, the series doesn’t quite stick the landing. One of the most noticeable flaws is the camerawork—certain zoom-ins and angles feel abrupt and out of place, pulling the viewer out of the moment instead of drawing them in. These visual choices feel more distracting than deliberate."

Vishal Menon of The Hollywood Reporter India observed that "Kammattam could have benefited a lot from a minimal mood, depth for its characters and the patience to give their story the sprawl it demands."

Filmfare gave it 3 out of 5 stars, calling it "a taut, watchable crime procedural" with an effective central performance by Sudev Nair and strong production design. However, it also noted that the series sacrificed emotional resonance and moral exploration due to its fast pacing.
