= Chapters (film) =

- First-look poster
- Directed by: Sunil Ibrahim
- Written by: Sunil Ibrahim
- Produced by: Shafeer Sait
- Starring: Sreenivasan; Nivin Pauly; Vijeesh; Dharmajan Bolgatty; Vineeth Kumar; Shine Tom Chacko; Aju Varghese; Riya Saira; Rejith Menon; Gauthami Nair; Hemanth Menon; K. P. A. C. Lalitha; Lena
- Cinematography: Krish Kymal
- Edited by: V. Saajan
- Music by: Mejo Joseph
- Production companies: Qurban Films; Campus Oaks
- Release date: 7 December 2012
- Country: India
- Language: Malayalam
- Budget: ₹1.3 crore (US$130,000)
- Box office: ₹0.42 crore (US$44,000)

Chapters is a 2012 Indian Malayalam-language film written and directed by Sunil Ibrahim (in his directorial debut). The dialogues were written by duo M. R. Vibin and Suhail Ibrahim. The film features an ensemble cast consisting of Sreenivasan, Nivin Pauly, Hemanth Menon, Vijeesh, Dharmajan Bolgatty, Vineeth Kumar, Shine Tom Chacko, Aju Varghese, Riya Saira, Rejith Menon, Gauthami Nair, K. P. A. C. Lalitha, and Lena. In a narrative structure similar to hyperlink cinema, the film consists of four "chapters", each related to the other in some or the other way. The film is produced by Shafeer Sait under the banner of Qurban Films in association with Campus Oaks and features music composed by Mejo Joseph. The cinematography is handled by Krish Kymal and editing by V. Saajan. Campus Oaks is an entertainment company, conceptualised and driven by students of the 1995 batch of NSS College of Engineering, Palakkad.

The film was released on 7 December 2012 to positive reviews.

== Plot ==
The film is narrated in textbook format with every new link to the story presented as a new chapter.

The first chapter talks about four friends, Krishna Kumar, Anwar, Joby, and Kannan, who are unemployed and in need of quick money. To make some money for Krishna Kumar's sister's wedding, they venture out for a risky adventure that will make them rich. It all works out well until the end when their plan goes all awry.

The second chapter is about a long bus journey. Sethu, a middle-aged man, is on his way to the hospital, where his young son awaits surgery and chemotherapy. Because he is carrying a huge sum of money for his young son's cancer treatment, Sethu is nervous and suspicious of his fellow passengers. Meanwhile, he strikes up a conversation with an old lady sitting next to him who reveals that she has a son who is in jail.

In the third chapter, we see another group of six youngsters. Arun, Vinod aka Choonda, Kaanu, and Jincy are heading to a hill station to register the marriage of Shyam and Priya. When the group returns to their car after stopping for a brief while, they find a dead body in it. The group disperses in panic.

In the fourth and final chapter, we see an anxious lady, Annie by her son's bedside in the hospital awaiting her husband's arrival. She is astonished when he arrives with the money, but refrains from taxing him with further questions. She does manage to convince him however that the money that he has brought in should better be left where it truly belongs.

The final scenes explain how the different chapters are interlinked. Though some of the characters never meet, a link connects them all.

== Cast ==
- Sreenivasan as Sethu
- Nivin Pauly as Krishna Kumar
- Hemanth Menon as Anwar
- Aju Varghese as Kaanu
- Lena as Annie
- Vineeth Kumar as Arun
- Sadiq as Krishna Kumar's father
- Gauthami Nair as Priya, Krishna Kumar's sister
- Manikandan Pattambi
- Vijeesh as Joby
- Dharmajan Bolgatty as Kannan
- Riya Saira as Jincy
- Rejith Menon as Shyam
- Manikandan as Chandrappan
- Shine Tom Chacko as Vinod aka Choonda
- K. P. A. C. Lalitha as the elderly woman
- Kalabhavan Shajohn as the conductor of the bus
- Dhananjay as Kannan
- Vanitha Krishnachandran
- Diljit Gore as Freak man

== Release and reception ==
A special screening of the film was held in the first week of December 2012. Theaterbalcony.com. Retrieved 10 December 2012. The film released in theatres on 7 December.

- Paresh C Palicha of Rediff.com stated, "The director succeeds in creating vivid characters (around 20 of them) and giving them believable motives for their actions so that they remain vivid in our memory. All said and done, Chapters shows promise."
- Sify.com's reviewer gave the verdict as "Average" and said, "Chapters is an experiment, which can be appreciated only for its narrative style that is relatively new in this part of the globe."
- Aabha Anoop of The Hindu stated, "A logical and well-knit script is what makes debutant director Sunil Ibrahim's Chapters another notable venture in the Malayalam cinema scene today. Set somewhere in the High Ranges, it could be noted for its cinematography. All the actors have played their part well, though none deserves a special mention. Producer Shafeer Sait may be appreciated for his willingness to experiment. Music by Mejo Joseph for Rafeeque Ahamed's lyrics, however, does not score well. Chapters could be watched for the sheer novelty of presentation."
