= Mukundan Unni Associates =

- Theatrical release poster
- Directed by: Abhinav Sunder Nayak
- Written by: Vimal Gopalakrishnan; Abhinav Sunder Nayak
- Produced by: Ajith Joy
- Starring: Vineeth Sreenivasan; Suraj Venjaramoodu; Aarsha Chandini Baiju; Sudhi Koppa; Tanvi Ram; Jagadish
- Narrated by: Vineeth Sreenivasan
- Cinematography: Viswajith Odukkathil
- Edited by: Nidhin Raj Arol; Abhinav Sunder Nayak
- Music by: Sibi Mathew Alex
- Production company: Joy Movie Productions
- Distributed by: Joy Movie Productions
- Release date: 11 November 2022
- Running time: 128 minutes
- Country: India
- Language: Malayalam
- Box office: ₹10 crore

Mukundan Unni Associates is a 2022 Indian Malayalam-language dark comedy crime film directed by Abhinav Sunder Nayak featuring Vineeth Sreenivasan, Suraj Venjaramoodu and Aarsha Chandini Baiju in lead roles. The film received mostly positive reviews from critics and was a commercial success at the box office. This is the first installment in Sunder Nayak's Success Trilogy, with the second installment being Mollywood Times, which released in 2026.

== Plot ==
Advocate Mukundan Unni is a failure as a lawyer. His efforts to get cases are futile, and he loses his job because of his plan to speak to a politician. To be rich, he tries to live a structured life for years, but success eludes him. His mother fractures her leg after seeing a cobra and falling from a step ladder, and he is short on cash for her surgery. An insurance agent of lawyer Adv. Venu O. V. approaches him in the hospital and with Mukundan's permission, converts the case to a road accident and helps him get an insurance claim. This allows him to pay for his mother's surgery. He also learns the strategy to make money via medical insurance claims.

Once Mukundan learns the techniques from Venu, he also starts to do the same. This creates enmity between the two lawyers. For a compromise, Venu gives an offer to Mukundan that they can get the contract of the security in the hospital and they can share the expenses, but Mukundan says he is not interested. Venu gets the contract and he blocks Mukundan from getting to his prospective clients. Out of options, a ruthless Mukundan puts the cobra in Venu's car and he meets with an accident and dies. Mukundan Unni does not have any competitors now.

Mukundan Unni gets a new client, who was thrashed by the police in custody. The police seeks his help to cover it up and Mukundan files it as an accident case and puts a claim in court. But he is unable to get a wound report from the doctor, so he forges one. The judge understands that it is a forged seal and files complaint against Mukundan. Mukundan is now married to the hospital receptionist who was helping him all the way, and while on his honeymoon, he decides to kill himself because he does not find any way to avoid arrest. He tries to buy 10 sleeping pills but the pharmacist refuses to give him so many without prescription. So he gets two tablets and mixes it in a soft drink that the bus driver was drinking. The driver falls into sleep and the bus runs into an accident with a school bus carrying 31 kids who were going on a trip . All of them are hospitalized.

The judge Sanghameshwaran who was handling Mukundan's case is now in police custody and under suspension because they find evidence of fake judgement in his laptop that was planted by the hospital owner. Mukundan understands that the case against him does not stand in court anymore and he replaces the forged document in court with another one that his friend and advocate Robin gave him. Mukundan rushes to the hospital and tries to file claim on behalf of all the kids that are in hospital. To prevent the kids to be moved to any other hospital, he cuts off the electricity, short circuits the generator and pours water in the fuel tanks of all ambulances.

Robin tries to blackmail Mukundan while they were in his car and asks for half the amount Mukundan will get from the accident claim. Mukundan runs his car into a tree which leaves Robin brain dead (and eventually dead). Meanwhile, one of the kids who was in the accident dies at the hospital due to lack of care and Mukundan manages to convince the owners to transfer the hospital administration to him. Now that he owns the hospital and a law firm that handles all accident cases, he emerges out to be the monopoly that he always wanted.

== Cast ==
- Vineeth Sreenivasan as Adv. Mukundan Unni
- Suraj Venjaramoodu as Adv. Venu O. V.
- Aarsha Chandini Baiju as Meenakshi Jayaraj
- Sudhi Koppa as Adv. Robin Thazhatthu
- Tanvi Ram as Adv. Jyothi Lakshmi
- Jagadish as Magistrate Sanghameshwaran
- Manikandan Pattambi as Mani
- Biju Sopanam as Dr. Sebatti
- George Kora as Dr. Vincent George Illikkal
- Sudheesh as George Illikkal
- Althaf Salim as Ambulance Driver Suresh
- Vijayan Karanthoor as ASI Chandrababu
- Riya Saira as Annie Kurian
- Ranjith as Adv. Gangadharan
- Sreejith Ravi as Clerk Satheeshan
- Noble Babu Thomas as DSP Sriram IPS
- Asha Madathil Sreekanth as MLA Reshma George
- Jishnu Mohan as Hospital Attendant
- Bhavana Babu as Adv. Jancy, Adv. Venu's junior
- Thankam Mohan as Janakiamma, Mukundan Unni's mother
- Nimisha Mohan as Prabha Madathil
- Arun Kurian as Radhakrishnan Iyer IAS, Jyothi's fiance (photo appearance)
- Salim Kumar as Adv. Mukundan Unni Sr., Mukundan's grandfather (voice appearance)
- Basil Joseph as himself (voice appearance)

== Release ==
The film was released on theatres on 11 November 2022 with a clean U certificate. Subsequently, it was released in digitally through Disney+ Hotstar on 13 January 2023.

== Reception ==
Mukundan Unni Associates received generally positive reviews from the critics. Reviewer Aswin Bharadwaj's lensmenreviews recommended the film with his iconic green color, lauding it as "an unapologetic wacky dark comedy." "The only issue I had with the film is the lack of tightness one can feel in the third act, as there isn't a precise central conflict in the movie. But by pushing the character to a darker space, Abhinav somehow distracts the audience using the fresh stuff he catered.", he added.

In The New Indian Express, Sajin Shrijith wrote "Abhinav Sunder Nayak's Mukundan Unni Associates is also the most visually inventive film since Thallumaala. It puts as much thought into the presentation as it does the performances." Along with considering Abhinav "has put his editing background to good use", he wrote that "Even its opening cards are outputs of admirable inventiveness.", and appreciated the work "puts as much thought into the presentation as it does the performances." He also speak highly of "Cinematographer Vishwajith Odukkathil's brown and beige-dominated frames carry much elegance and keep their focus firmly on the characters." The assisting of technical elements for the characterization was also impressive according to Sajin; "Lapse footage, jump cuts, collages, or disorienting camera tilts and zooms to give us a sense of the passage of time, or a character's state of mind." He concluded, "One can find the protagonist's actions disagreeable and still watch it as an unapologetic and amusing portrait of the character. It just wants to say, “This is how the real world is. There exist characters like Mukundan Unni.” "

S.R. Praveen of The Hindu praised the film by writing "The themes explored - which in another movie might have been treated in a dark, sombre mood - get an uproariously humorous treatment by film editor-turned-director Abhinav Sunder Nayak and co-writer Vimal Gopalakrishnan.", but criticized the repetitiveness and monotony in certain parts: "The one downside is that in concentrating on one aspect of his personality, we are at times served with scenes that might seem repetitive." Cris of The News Minute also find the issues related to repetitiveness, even though she is impressed with the performance of actors and dark humour. "Though the film is packed with events, with Mukundan running from one failed scheme to another in the first half, all of it appears to go through a maze that reaches nowhere. The script is not gripping like a thriller and sometimes seems a tad repetitive. It is, however, really interesting and after every few minutes you find a new layer to Mukundan's character - or perhaps one more low that he does not mind sinking into.", she wrote.

Baradwaj Rangan through Galatta Plus largely commended the film by saying that "Mukundan Unni Associates is a delicious, deadpan, dark comedy, with a superbly cast vineeth sreenivasan." Vishal Menon from filmcompanion praised the film as "a hilariously twisted black comedy lifted by an equally twisted Vineeth."

In a mixed review from The Times of India, Anjana George criticized the film's narrative as "dull". About the narrative she said, "It does not give one the chills and thrills, a thriller could give or the joy that watching a movie would provide. Instead, it getting boring with Mukundan Unni narrating every aspect of the movie. The complications, overthinking and manipulations are, at times, unbearable." "As the prime focus is on the narcissist Mukundan Unni, it's difficult to look at other characters in depth. The movie has only one perspective and leads nowhere other than the wretched mind of the protagonist.", she added, and concluded by writing "On the whole, the subjective storytelling adapted in the film has not worked well."
