= Madhura Manohara Moham =

2023 Indian film

- Theatrical release poster
- Directed by: Stephy Zaviour
- Written by: Mahesh Gopal; Jai Vishnu
- Produced by: B3M Creations
- Starring: Sharaf U Dheen; Rajisha Vijayan; Bindu Panicker; Aarsha Chandini Baiju
- Cinematography: Chandru Selvaraj
- Edited by: Appu N. Bhattathiri; Malavika V. N.
- Music by: Hesham Abdul Wahab
- Production company: B3M Creations
- Release date: 16 June 2023
- Running time: 117 minutes
- Country: India
- Language: Malayalam
- Budget: ₹4 crore (US$420,000)
- Box office: ₹10 crore (US$1.0 million)

Madhura Manohara Moham (transl. Sweet beautiful desire) is a 2023 Indian Malayalam-language comedy drama film directed by Stephy Zaviour and written by Mahesh Gopal and Jai Vishnu. The film features an ensemble cast with Sharaf U Dheen, Rajisha Vijayan, Bindu Panicker, Aarsha Chandini Baiju, Vijayaraghavan and Saiju Kurup. Set in Kumbazha, the story revolves around the events surrounding the lives of siblings Manu and Meera and the unexpected truths that unfold. The film was a commercial success at the box office.

== Plot ==
Ushamma is the wife of the late Mohan of Kalluvelil Tharavad, a Nair family in Kumbazha. She has three children: Manu is the eldest, the second one is Meera, and Malu is the youngest. Manu is a second-grade overseer in the Public Works Department in Pathanamthitta; Meera is a final-year M. Com student at Catholicate College; while Malu is a second-year engineering student at Mount Zion College. When Mohan died, Manu gets the job. He has been selected as the new secretary of the Kumbazha Saraswati Vilasam Nair Service Society Karayogam. Manu is in love with Shalabha, the daughter of Karayogam president Indrasena Kurup. Meera, on the other hand, also runs a tuition centre at her home for students.

One night, Shalabha calls Manu and asks him to come home while her parents went to Guruvayur. Manu visits Shalabha's house with his friend Ambadi. Unexpectedly, Indrasena Kurup and his wife Susheela come back and find Manu and Shalabha together. Fearing the disgrace of the two's relationship, Indrasena Kurup assures that his daughter Shalabha's marriage will soon take place with Manu. The following day, Manu's coworker, Assistant Engineer Jose Oommen, informs him that Manu's sister Meera is having an affair with a Christian teen named Disney James. Manu and Jose make a visit to Disney James, who runs a studio near Meera's college, wants to learn more about his affair with Meera. Ushamma is unhappy when he tells her about Meera's love affair. Meera is taken seriously by Manu and Ushamma as she returns after a week-long college tour. At that time, Jose dials Meera's phone. Manu, who answers the phone, secretly looks through the gallery and notices several photos of Meera and another young man together, which upsets and shocks him.

Jose and Ambadi meet Shalabha, who is also a student at Meera's college, and tell her that she should find out about Meera's college crush in secret because Meera's family is planning a wedding proposal for her. Shalabha learns that Meera is in love with a young Muslim named Anwar Shereef. After hearing about Meera's other love affair, Manu decides to arrange Meera's wedding as soon as possible. With the help of Jose and Ambadi, Manu arranges a marriage proposal for Meera with a young man named Jeevan Raj through a matrimonial site. Manu also tells Ushamma about Meera's second love affair, which makes her even more upset and angry. Meera was very happy when Manu and Ushamma told her about the marriage proposal. But this confuses Manu and Ushamma. One Sunday, Jeevan and his family visit Meera's house in order to see her and finalize the marriage. After visiting the house, Jeevan's mother calls Meera's neighbour, Komala, and inquires about her. Komala tells Jeevan's mother that Meera is a good girl, which makes Jeevan very pleased. While Manu and Shalabha went outside, Manu saw a girl and a boy together who were Meera's students at the tuition centre. The girl tells Manu that Meera has supported their love and promised to help them get married. This makes Manu totally upset.

Around midnight, Manu gets up to drink water and hears Meera talking to someone on the phone. Manu learns that Meera has two other boyfriends, Vishnu and Mahesh. When Meera went out the next day, Manu and Ushamma searched her room and found several SIM cards. Sree Shankar, who once visited Meera's home to inspect their cow, comes with his mother with a marriage proposal. But Ushamma tells them that Meera's marriage has been fixed with another person and invites them to Meera's wedding. Meanwhile, Meera tries to end her relationships with Disney James, Anwar and Vishnu by telling them about her marriage proposal. On the eve of the wedding, Anwar visits Meera's house, but seeing Manu's tension, Jose comforts Anwar and returns him. Manu notices Meera quietly talking on the phone in the middle of the wedding preparations and leaves feeling sad, and angrily reveals that he and Ushamma knows all about her love affairs. Meera's lovers, Anwar and Disney James, as well as Sree Shankar, were present at the wedding ceremony. Manu and Jose are concerned that Anwar may cause problems, but the wedding goes off without any issues. After the wedding, one guy comes and tells Ambadi and Jose that Bijukuttan, the conductor of the bus in which Meera usually traveled, was also her lover for four years. Malu tells Manu and Ushamma that Meera will be her role model, which shocks them.

On the night of the wedding, Jeevan Raj confesses all his secrets to Meera.

== Cast ==
- Sharaf U Dheen as Manu Mohan Nair
- Rajisha Vijayan as Meera Mohan Nair, Manu's sister
- Bindu Panicker as Ushamma Mohan, Manu's, Meera's & Maalu’s mother
- Aarsha Chandini Baiju as Salabha Indrasenan, Manu's love interest
- Vijayaraghavan as Indrasena Kurup
- Saiju Kurup as Jeevan Raj
- Shine Tom Chacko as Vishnu Sudarshan (cameo appearance)
- Althaf Salim as Ambadi
- Meenakshi Madhavi as Malavika Mohan aka Maalu
- Biju Sopanam as Joseph Oommen alias Josephchayan
- Niranj Maniyanpilla Raju as Disney James
- Sunil Sukhada as Janardhanan Nair
- Aravind S. K. as Anwar Shereef
- Neena Kurup as Susheela, Indrasena Kurup's wife
- Jai Vishnu as Bijukuttan
- Sanju Madhu as Manoj
- Sooraj Nair as Bipish Menon
- Manu as Sree Shankar

=== Family Tree of Kalluvelil family ===
Indrasenan Kurup	Susheela	Kalluvelil Mohanan Nair †	Usha Mohanan Nair (Ushamma)
Manu Mohan Nair	Salabha Indrasenan		Meera Mohan Nair	Jeevan Raj	Malavika Mohan Nair (Malu)

== Production ==
=== Development ===
The film marks the directorial debut of costume designer Stephy Zaviour. She started writing a story with Gautham Surya for a film she had planned to make since 2018, but it was delayed by the COVID-19 pandemic. Pathanamthitta-based Jai Vishnu and Kollam-based Mahesh Gopal met Stephy with a script to get her opinion on both the script and the lead actress. Stephy suggested Rajisha Vijayan, who agreed to do the project. After three days, Stephy decided to direct the film. B3M Creations took over the production of the film. Chandru Selvaraj was recruited as the cinematographer when filming got delayed and the original cinematographer had to go on with another project. Appu Bhattathiripad and Malavika V. N. were recruited as the editors. The film's title was officially announced on 15 January 2023.

=== Filming ===
Following discussion between Jai Vishnu and Mahesh Gopal, Pathanamthitta was selected as the primary location. The filming began in September 2022 and wrapped up in November.

== Soundtrack ==
The songs are composed by Hesham Abdul Wahab and the background score is composed by Jibin Gopal. Lyrics are written by Harinarayanan B. K. and Suhail Koya.

#	Song	Music	Lyrics	Singers
1	"Chakkappaattu (Thinthnakku...Paattambalathil)"	Ganjira, Khatom	Ganjira, Khatom	Vazhappally TS Satheesh Kumar, Chorus
2	"Ayyappa Swaamiyalle"	Hesham Abdul Wahab	B. K. Harinarayanan	Sannidanandan, Suroor Musthafa, Aswin Vijayan, Milan Joy
3	"Kandu Kandu Naamithaa"	Hesham Abdul Wahab	B. K. Harinarayanan	Hesham Abdul Wahab
4	"Madhura Manohara Moham"	Hesham Abdul Wahab	Suhail Koya	Jibin Gopal
5	"Oru Nokkil Mozhiyothi"	Hesham Abdul Wahab	B. K. Harinarayanan	Arvind Venugopal, Bhadra Rajin
6	"Thathana Thathana"	Hesham Abdul Wahab	B. K. Harinarayanan	K. S. Chithra, Chorus (Aavani Malhar, Bhadra Rajin, Divya S Menon, Sony Mohan, P Samanwitha)

The soundtrack received positive reviews for its melodious compositions and soulful lyrics.

== Release ==
The film was released worldwide on 16 June 2023. Highrich OTT acquired the digital rights of the film and started streaming it on 22 August 2023. The film also started streaming on Amazon Prime Video from May 2025.

== Reception ==
=== Box office ===
The film grossed ₹9.8 crore (US$1.0 million) worldwide, with Kerala box office accounting for ₹7 crore (US$730,000), ₹40 lakh (US$42,000) from the rest of India, and ₹2.4 crore (US$250,000) from overseas collections.

=== Critical reception ===
Anjana George of The Times of India gave the film 3.5 out of 5 stars and wrote "It is a beautifully crafted film with pleasant cinematography, soulful music, and seamless editing. The actors, including Bindu Panicker, Rajisha Vijayan, Sharfuddin, Aarsha Baiju, Althaf, and Saiju Kurup, have played their roles really well, making it more engaging and entertaining." S. R. Praveen of The Hindu stated "In the end, 'Madhura Manohara Moham' looks like a film where the writers started working around a few progressive bullet points, because these are in vogue, but soon developed cold feet and veered off into a harmless direction." Sajin Shrijith of The New Indian Express gave the film 2.5/5 stars and said "Madhura Manohara Moham calls out the double standards of certain groups without going easy on both genders."

Sanjith Sidhardhan of OTTPlay gave 3/5 stars and wrote "Rajisha Vijayan and Sharafudheen's Madhura Manohara Moham is replete with incidents, that mock hypocrisy, preconceived notions and feudal mindsets of people." Cris of The News Minute wrote "What seems to begin as a satire of casteism, switches gear to turn its attention to the female protagonist with a questionable lens." Anandu Suresh of The Indian Express gave 0.5/5 stars and said "Madhura Manohara Moham can be described as a film that, under the guise of mocking casteism and patriarchy, actually reinforces these practices shamelessly."
