= Jins Baskar =

Indian film actor and model

Jinsbaskar
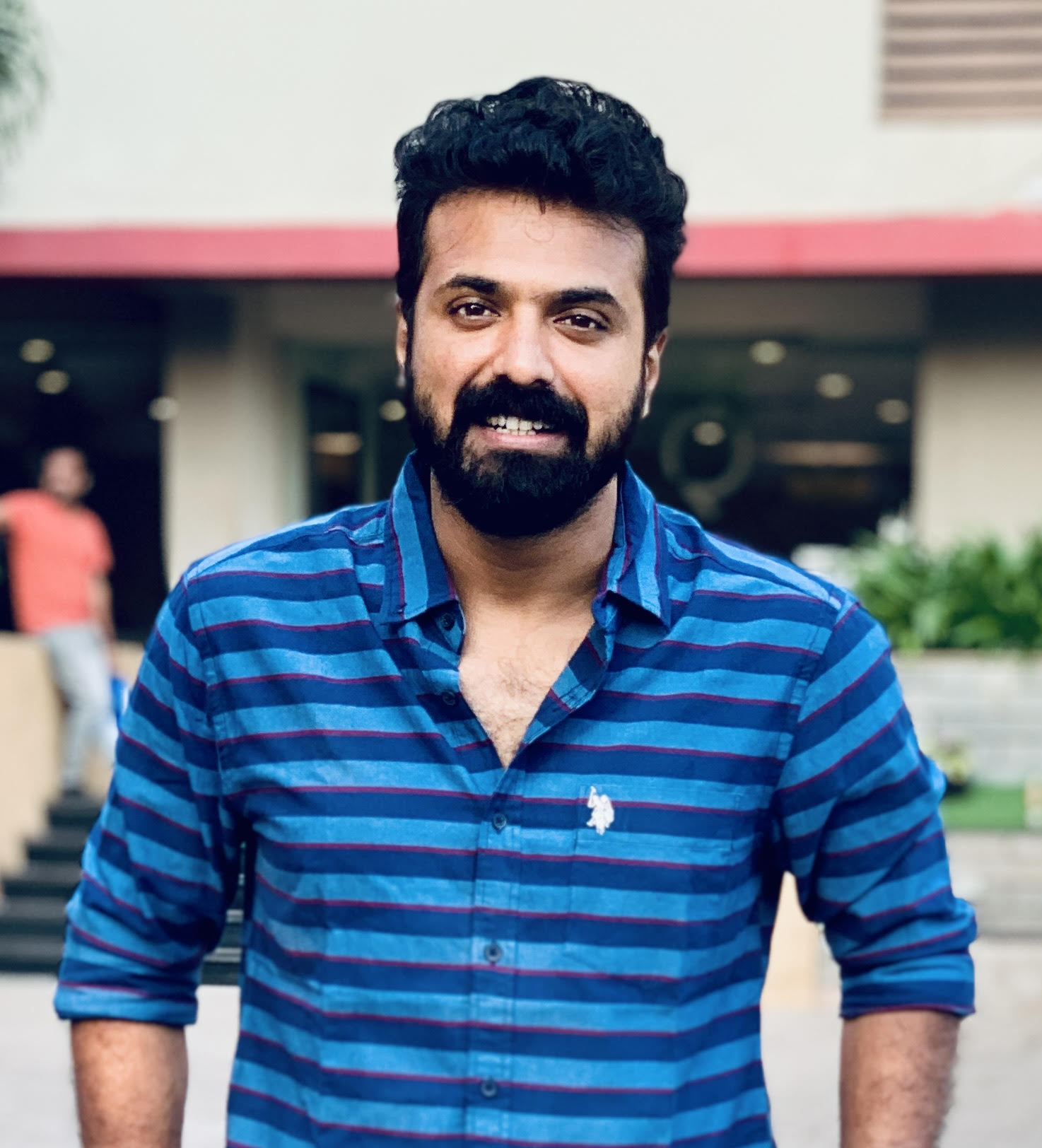
- Born: 20-Feb; Kerala
- Occupation: Actor | Project Designer
- Years active: 2011–present
- Spouse: Jincy Jose
- Children: 2

Jins Baskar is an Indian actor and model. He made his debut in the 2011 Malayalam film Swapna Sanchari directed by Kamal.

== Early life ==
Jinsbaskar was born in Kannur, Kerala, India as the second son of his parents and grew up in Wayanad. He is an alumnus of Mar Athanasius College of Engineering where he graduated in Computer Science and Engineering. He was employed in Tata Consultancy Services in Chennai, in the IT field and moved to Kochi to pursue his acting ambitions.

== Career ==
Jins Baskar began his career as a model, appearing in several television and print advertisements, before transitioning into acting.

He made his acting breakthrough in 2013 with the Malayalam film Annayum Rasoolum, directed by Rajeev Ravi, in which he played the role of Jismon.

In 2015, he appeared as Arun in Ayal Njanalla, directed by Vineeth Kumar, alongside Fahadh Faasil.

In 2017, he was seen in the crime anthology film Y, directed by Sunil Ibrahim, portraying a gangster with a moral conscience.

In 2018, Baskar featured in Maradona, alongside Tovino Thomas and Leona Lishoy, and also appeared in Njan Marykutty, directed by Ranjith Sankar, playing the brother-in-law of the protagonist portrayed by Jayasurya.

In 2020, he acted in Vellam: The Essential Drink, directed by Prajesh Sen, where he played a village resident alongside Jayasurya.

He later appeared as a police officer in Michael’s Coffee House, which began production in 2019 and was released after delays caused by the COVID-19 pandemic.

In 2022, Baskar appeared in the mystery thriller Roy, written and directed by Sunil Ibrahim, starring Suraj Venjaramoodu and Sija Rose. The film was released as a direct-to-streaming exclusive on SonyLIV.

In the same year, he made his Tamil-language debut with the bilingual film Ottu, featuring Kunchacko Boban and Arvind Swamy.

He has also appeared in short films and web series, including the Malayalam web series Kammattam.

== Filmography ==
Year	Title	Role	Notes
2011	Swapna Sanchari	Ajayachandran's brother-in-law	
2012	Hero		
2012	I Love Me	Groom	
2013	Entry	Don Lucifer	
2013	Annayum Rasoolum	Jismon	
2013	D Company	College student	
2015	Ayal Njanalla	Arun	
2017	Himalayathile Kashmalan	Unni	
2017	Y	Gang leader (flat)	
2018	Maradona	Sree	
2018	Njan Marykutty	Sabu	
2020	Vellam: The Essential Drink	Abhijit	
2020	Michael’s Coffee House	ACP Arun Kumar Varma	
2022	Roy (2022 film)	SI Asif Ahmed	Released on 9 December 2022
2022	Ottu	Kichu’s informer	Malayalam–Tamil bilingual film
2022	Rendagam	Kichu’s informer	Tamil version of Ottu
2025	Bhoothayanam	Miju	Short film
2026	Anomie	Sameer	Released on 6 February 2026

== Web series ==
Year	Title	Role	Platform	Notes
2025	Kammattam	Ayyappadas	ZEE5	Crime thriller web series
