= Vinodayathra =

- Theatrical release poster
- Directed by: Sathyan Anthikkad
- Written by: Sathyan Anthikkad
- Produced by: M. M. Hamsa
- Starring: Dileep; Mukesh; Nedumudi Venu; Meera Jasmine; Parvathy Thiruvothu; Ganapathi S. Poduval
- Cinematography: S. Kumar
- Edited by: K. Rajagopal
- Music by: Ilaiyaraaja
- Production company: Kalasangham Films
- Distributed by: Kalasangham Films
- Release date: 5 April 2007
- Running time: 150 minutes
- Country: India
- Language: Malayalam

Vinodayathra (transl. Leisure Trip – transl. Vinod's Journey ) is a 2007 Indian Malayalam-language comedy drama film written and directed by Sathyan Anthikkad, and starring Dileep and Mukesh along with Meera Jasmine, Murali, Innocent, Ganapathi S Poduval, KPAC Lalitha, Nedumudi Venu, Seetha and Parvathy in supporting roles. Some scenes of the film were reportedly inspired by the 2001 Korean film My Sassy Girl. The film became a blockbuster at the box office and completed more than 175 days in theatres and has over the years attained cult status.

== Plot ==
It is the story of an irresponsible but good-natured young man, Vinod who came from UAE, who comes to a hilly village to live with his elder sister, Vimala, brother-in-law, Shaji, and his sister, Rashmi. Shaji is a reputed engineer in the irrigation department, and Vinod wants to learn life from him. However, he ends up creating problems for Shaji. Vinod meets many people in the village and learns life lessons from them, mainly from Anupama whom he falls in love with.

== Cast ==
- Dileep as Vinod Kumar
- Mukesh as Shaji Raghavan
- Meera Jasmine as Anupama Vijayan
- Seetha as Vimala
- Parvathy Thiruvothu as Reshmi
- Murali as Vijayan
- Innocent as Thankachan
- Ganapathi S Poduval as Ganapathi
- Nedumudi Venu as IG John Mathew IPS
- K.P.A.C. Lalitha as John Mathew's sister
- Mammukoya as Ananthan
- Vijayaraghavan as Rajan
- Sreelatha Namboothiri as Soshamma Thankachen
- Babu Namboothiri as Kunnath Ramanunni, Vinod's and Vimala's father
- Reshmi Boban as Ambili
- Anoop Chandran as Velappan
- Bindu Murali
- Sabitha Anand as Anupama's mother
- Muthumani as School Teacher- cameo appearance
- Manjusha Sajish
- Sethulakshmi as saree vendor
- Sreekutty as Molly Varghese
- Vijayan Karanthoor as SI Stephen

== Music ==
Vinodayathra

Soundtrack album by Ilaiyaraaja
- Released: April 6, 2007
- Genre: Film
- Length: 151 minutes
- Language: Malayalam

The score and soundtrack of the film were composed by Ilaiyaraaja. The songs were written by Vayalar Sarathchandra Varma. All songs became chartbusters.

Song title	Singer
"Akkikkokki"	Vijay Yesudas
"Kaiyetha" (F)	Manjari
"Kaiyetha" (M)	Dr. K. J. Yesudas
"Mandaarappoo Mooli"	Madhu Balakrishnan, Shweta Mohan
"Mandaarappoo Mooli" (M)	Madhu Balakrishnan
"Thennippaayum"	Afsal, Vineeth Sreenivasan

== Awards and nominations ==
Asianet Film Awards

- Asianet Film Award for Best Actress - Meera Jasmine
- Asianet Film Award for Best Child Artist - Ganapathi S Poduval

Kerala State Film Awards

- Kerala State Film Award for Best Screenplay - Sathyan Anthikad
- Kerala State Film Award for Best Choreography - Brinda
