= Chithrasalabhangalude Veedu =

- Directed by: Krishnakumar
- Written by: Brijesh Balakrishnan
- Produced by: Ravi Chalissery
- Starring: Master Ganapathi; Sai Kumar; Lakshmi Sharma
- Cinematography: Kannan
- Edited by: K Sreenivas
- Music by: Dr Muhammed Shakkel
- Distributed by: Seven Power release
- Release date: 26 September 2008
- Country: India
- Language: Malayalam

Chithrasalabhangalude Veedu (English: The house of butterflies) is a 2008 Malayalam language film for children, directed by Krishnakumar.

== Plot ==
Chithrasalabhangalude Veedu tells the story of a boy named Muthu, studying in tenth standard. Muthu is one of the naughtiest boys in the school. He has a gang of friends also. One day he gets arrested for bringing arrack to school. It was the circumstances which moulded the nature of Muthu, but people never bother for those factors and Muthu is always victimized.

== Cast ==
- Ganapathi S Poduval
- Lakshmi Sharma
- Shivaji Guruvayoor
- Manraj
- Gayathri
- Sai Kumar
- Mala Aravindan
- Ambika Mohan
- Manikandan
- T.S.Raju
- Chali Pala
- Shyam Sunder
- Sreenath Ullanat
