= Riya Saira =

Indian actress and dubbing artist

- Born: Riya Saira; 1994 (age 31–32); Kottayam
- Occupations: Actress; Dubbing artist
- Years active: 2012 – present

Riya Saira is an Indian actress and dubbing artist in the Malayalam film industry.

== Career ==
She participated in Surya TV's reality show, Big Break. She was into anchoring also. Later she entering into acting. She started dubbing from childhood. She made her debut in 2012, through the Malayalam film 22 Female Kottayam directed by Aashiq Abu. Saira was chosen for 22 Female Kottayam while shooting for her debut movie Shutter. Abu wanted her to cut off her hair to look like the character, but she couldn't as the shoot for Shutter wasn't complete and so she wore a wig. She got Kerala State film Award for best dubbing artist in 2020 for the film Ayyappanum Koshiyum.

== Filmography ==
=== As actress ===
Year	Title	Role	Notes
2012	22 Female Kottayam	Tissa K. Abraham	Debut film
2012	Theevram	Nimmy	
2012	Chapters	Jincy	
2013	Shutter	Nyla	
2013	Radio Jockey	Saritha	
2013	Arikil Oraal	Helen	
2013	Aaru Sundarimaarude Katha	Journalist	
2013	Oru Indian Pranayakatha	Merin	
2014	Law Point	Sara	
2014	Abukka Adichu Mone	Sneha	Short film
2015	Mili	Kalyani	
2015	Lord Livingstone 7000 Kandi	Chirutha	
2015	Onnum Onnum Moonu	Widow	Segment: "Ambulance"
2019	Kumbalangi Nights	Sumeesha	
2019	Vikruthi	Sajitha	
2021	Jan.E.Man	Jesnamol	
2022	Mukundan Unni Associates	Annie Kurien	
2022	Saudi Vellakka	Public Prosecutor	
2022	Roy	Dr. Aswathy	
2023	Theru	Sunandha	
2024	Adios Amigo	Reshmi	
2025	Cherukkanum Pennum		

=== As dubbing artist ===
Year	Film	Role
2002	Kalyanaraman	
2003	Swapnakoodu	
2004	Black	
2005	Bus Conductor	Arun Krishnan
2009	Black Dalia	
2010	Aathmakatha	Shafna
2010	Shikkar	Mythili
2010	Best of Luck	
2010	Four Friends	
2011	The Filmstaar	Muktha
2011	Bhakthajanangalude Sradhakku	
2012	Cinema Company	Shruthi Hariharan
2012	Second Show	Gauthami Nair
2012	Grandmaster	
2012	Jawan of Vellimala	
2012	The Hitlist	
2012	Simhasanam	Aishwarya Devan
2012	Puthiya Theerangal	Namitha Pramod
2013	Sound Thoma	Namitha Pramod
2013	Bangles	Archana Kavi
2013	Pattam Pole	Archana Kavi
2013	Abhiyum Njanum	
2013	Mumbai Police	
2013	North 24 Kaatham	Swathi Reddy
2014	Mannar Mathai Speaking 2	Aparna Gopinath
2014	Mosayile Kuthira Meenukal	Swathi Reddy
2014	Ulsaha Committee	Isha Talwar
2014	Day Night Game	Archana Kavi
2014	To Let Ambadi Talkies	
2015	Ivan Maryadaraman	Nikki Galrani
2015	Charlie	Reshma Sebastian
2015	Mili	Sanusha
2015	Nirnayakam	
2015	Lavender	
2016	Annmariya Kalippilaanu	Leona Lishoy
2016	Kochavva Paulo Ayyappa Coelho	
2016	Kuttikalundu Sookshikkuka	Anumol
2017	The Great Father	Sneha
2017	Alamara	Aditi Ravi
2018	Ente Ummante Peru	Saara Deva
2018	Kinavalli	
2019	Mamangam	Prachi Tehlan
2019	Ishq	Ann Sheetal
2019	Unda	
2019	Mamangam	
2019	Prathi Poovankozhi	
2020	Ayyappanum Koshiyum	Anna Rajan and Gowri Nandha
2020	Anjaam Pathiraa	Unnimaya Prasad
2020	Love	
2021	Backpapers	
2022	Paappan	Neeta Pillai
2022	Twenty One Gms	Leona Lishoy
2022	Bheeshma Parvam	Anasuya Bharadwaj
2022	Pathonpatham Noottandu	Kayadu Lohar
2022	PS-1 (Malayalam dubbed)	Trisha
2023	Corona Papers	Gayathrie and Sandhya Shetty
2023	PS-2 (Malayalam dubbed)	Trisha

=== Television ===
Year	Programme	Channel	Role
2015	Star Challenge	Flowers TV	Contestant
2015	Smart Show	Flowers TV	Contestant
2020	Salt n Pepper	Kaumudy TV	Celebrity presenter
2021	Red Carpet	Amrita TV	Mentor

Endorsements

- Shama Spices
