= Adios Amigo (2024 film) =

Indian comedy drama film

- Theatrical release poster
- Directed by: Nahas Nazar
- Written by: Thankam
- Produced by: Ashiq Usman
- Starring: Asif Ali; Suraj Venjaramoodu
- Cinematography: Jimshi Khalid
- Edited by: Nishadh Yusuf
- Music by: Songs: Gopi Sundar Jakes Bejoy; Score: Jakes Bejoy
- Production company: Ashiq Usman Productions
- Distributed by: Central Pictures
- Release date: 9 August 2024
- Running time: 156 minutes
- Country: India
- Language: Malayalam

Adios Amigo (transl. Farewell, friend) is a 2024 Indian Malayalam-language comedy-drama film directed by Nahas Nazar and written by Thankam. It stars Asif Ali and Suraj Venjaramoodu. The film is the story of two men who, after meeting at a bus stop, decide to travel together. Since they don't have a set destination, they go to different places and spend time together.

The film received mixed reviews from critics.

== Plot ==
Sathpriyan alias Priyan is a middle-aged man in a dire financial situation. He spends time drinking with friends when he is faced with a crisis—his mother is hospitalized, and only his sister Minimol is by her side. Desperate to cover her medical expenses, Priyan seeks help from friends and relatives, but due to outstanding debts, no one is willing to lend him money. Finally, a man named Sojan agrees to help, but on the condition that Priyan provides a guarantee cheque. The two plan to meet the following morning to exchange the money and cheque.

Priyan arrives at the bus station to wait for Sojan. However, Sojan gets delayed for several hours due to an urgent matter, and Priyan agrees to wait. At the bus station, he encounters Prince, an influential, wealthy but aimless and careless young man. Prince, often drunk, spends lavishly without thought and is estranged from his family, particularly his father, who has cut off his financial support. Despite his reckless nature, Prince invites Priyan to join him on a spontaneous bus ride, convincing him that waiting for money is pointless. Reluctantly, Priyan agrees.

Their journey takes them to a place familiar to Prince, where they visit a large clothing store. It becomes clear that Prince is there to meet a woman named Hema, his ex-girlfriend. However, Hema, disillusioned by Prince's constant alcoholism, refuses to see him. The store staff also dismiss Prince for the same reason. Priyan speaks with Hema, who tells him she will only meet Prince when he is sober. That night, Prince and Priyan check into a luxury hotel, where Priyan enjoys the comforts of the room while Prince sleeps off his drunken state.

The next day, Priyan stops Prince from drinking and takes him to meet Hema while sober. They finally confront their feelings about their past, particularly a major accident they both survived, which left Hema losing her right leg and Prince bedridden for months. Their conversation helps them find closure, and they part on good terms. Prince, grateful to Priyan for making this happen, continues traveling with him, spending the rest of his money.

As they run out of funds, Prince tries to borrow more from friends and relatives, but his father has instructed everyone not to help him. Meanwhile, Priyan shares his mother's dire situation with Prince. Prince, now understanding Priyan's desperation, attempts to get his wife Rini to transfer ₹50,000 to Priyan, but she refuses since Prince has been absent from home for days. With no other option, the two decide to go their separate ways and Priyan heads back to see his mother.

However, Prince soon returns with a rented car, offering to help Priyan by driving him to the hospital and attempting to secure funds. They visit Prince's sister and her husband who is the Mayor of Kochi, but they too refuse to help. With no money left and the driver growing frustrated, Priyan contacts Sojan again. Sojan lends him only ₹10,000, of which ₹7,000 goes to the driver, leaving them stranded on the road. Despite Sojan urging Priyan to abandon Prince and focus on his mother, Priyan refuses to leave his drunken friend behind.

They spend the night sleeping by the roadside, and when they wake up, they realize they are near Prince's house. The two part ways, with Priyan boarding a bus to see his mother and Prince heading home. But just as Priyan departs, he receives a message that Rini has transferred ₹50,000 to his account. Overjoyed, Priyan rushes back to Prince, and they share a moment of happiness and Priyan departs.

== Cast ==
- Asif Ali as Prince Paul Kurian
- Suraj Venjaramoodu as Priyan / Satpriyan aka Boss
- Anagha as Hema, Prince's ex-lover and friend
- Shine Tom Chacko as Sojan, Priyan's friend
- Vineeth Thattil David as Taxi Driver Sujith
- Althaf Salim as Rony, Priyan's friend
- Nandu as Hotel manager Eldhose
- Ganapathi S. Poduval as Bintopi, Priyan's friend
- Muthumani as Shymol, Prince's sister
- Jinu Joseph as Alex Paul, Kochi Mayor, Prince's brother-in-law
- Riya Saira as Reshmi, Hema's friend
- Mani Shornur as Security
- Rafi as Paul Kurian, Prince's father
- Aparna Balamurali as Minimol, Priyan's sister (voice only)
- Rajisha Vijayan as Rini, Prince's wife (voice only)
- Aju Varghese as Rajesh, Priyan's Friend (Voice Only)

== Music ==
The music is composed by Gopi Sundar and Jakes Bejoy also the lyrics is written by Vinayak Sasikumar. Background score of the film is done by Jakes Bejoy.

Adios Amigo

Soundtrack album by Gopi Sundar
- Recorded: 2024
- Genre: Feature film soundtrack
- Language: Malayalam
- Label: Muzik 247

Track listing
No.	Title	Singer(s)	Length
1.	"Manne Nambi"	Dabzee	3:04
2.	"Iniyum Kaanan Varam"	Jakes Bejoy, Najim Arshad, Vinayak Sasikumar	2:13
3.	"Neelakaayal"	Job Kurian	3:31
4.	"Enikkoru Kaalam Varum"	Jakes Bejoy, Vinayak Sasikumar	0:55
Total length:			9:03
