= Stephy Zaviour =

Indian costume designer

- Born: 20 June 1992 (age 34); Mananthavady, Kerala, India
- Occupations: Costume designer; fashion designer; film director
- Years active: 2015–present

Stephy Zaviour is an Indian costume designer working predominantly in Malayalam cinema.

== Early life ==
Stephy was born to Late Zaviour Karivelil and Gracy Karivelil and brought up in Wayanad, Kerala. She did her schooling at St.Joseph Higher Secondary School, Kallody, and graduated with a bachelor's degree from K.L.E. Society's S. Nijalingappa College, Bangalore.

== Career ==
She started her career as costumer designer in the industry when she was just 23. She completed over 110 films by the year 2021, including Lord Livingstone 7000 Kandi, Guppy and Ezra. In 2016, Stephy worked on more than 96 films and 300 ad films. Stephy won her first Kerala State Award for Costume Designer for her work in the movie Guppy. She made her directorial debut through the film Madhura Manohara Moham.

== Filmography ==
=== As costume designer ===
Year	Title	Notes
2015	Lord Livingstone 7000 Kandi	
2016	Guppy	Kerala State Film Award for Best Costume Designer
2017	Ezra	
2017	Angamaly Diaries	
2018	Joseph	
2019	Ishq	
2021	Cold Case	
2022	Aaraattu	
2022	Jana Gana Mana	
2024	Aadujeevitham	
2026	Aadu 3	

=== As director ===
Year	Title	Director	Notes
2023	Madhura Manohara Moham	Yes	Debut film
