= Chidambaram S. Poduval =

Indian film director and screenwriter

- Born: Payyanur, Kerala, India
- Occupations: Director; screenwriter
- Relatives: Ganapathi S. Poduval (brother)

Chidambaram S. Poduval, known mononymously as Chidambaram, is an Indian film director and screenwriter who works in Malayalam cinema. He is best known for his 2nd directorial Manjummel Boys (2024) which went to become the highest-grossing Malayalam film of 2024. It broke the record for the highest-grossing Malayalam film at the time, becoming the highest-grossing Malayalam film of all time and remains one of the highest-grossing Malayalam films

== Personal life and career ==
Chidambaram is known for his debut film Jan.E.Man (2021) and Manjummel Boys (2024). He is the elder brother of actor Ganapathi, who co-wrote Jan.E.Man along with him. He was previously an assistant director to Jayaraj and assistant cinematographer to Rajeev Ravi and K. U. Mohanan.

== Filmography ==
Year	Title	Notes	Ref.
2021	Jan.E.Man	Debut film	
2024	Manjummel Boys		
2026	Oru Durooha Saahacharyathil	Acting debut as Armiyas in a lead role	
2026	Balan - The Boy		

== Awards and honours ==
Year	Film	Award	Category	Ref.
2024	Manjummel Boys	Kerala State Film Awards	Best Director	
2024	Manjummel Boys	Kerala State Film Awards	Best Screenplay (Original)	
2024	Manjummel Boys	Kerala State Film Awards	Best Film	
