= Jan.E.Man =

2021 Indian Malayalam-language film

- Theatrical release poster
- Directed by: Chidambaram
- Written by: Chidambaram; Ganapathi; Sapnesh Varachal
- Produced by: Lakshmi Warrier; Ganesh Menon; Sajith Kookal; Shawn Antony
- Starring: Basil Joseph; Lal; Arjun Ashokan; Balu Varghese; Ganapathi S Poduval
- Cinematography: Vishnu Thandassery
- Edited by: Kiran Das
- Music by: Bijibal
- Production company: Cheers Entertainment
- Release date: 19 November 2021
- Running time: 147 minutes
- Country: India
- Language: Malayalam

Jan.E.Man (Urdu term for darling) is a 2021 Indian Malayalam-language dark humour drama film written and directed by Chidambaram S. Poduval in his directorial debut. The screenplay was co-written by Ganapathi S Poduval and Sapnesh Varachal. The film stars Basil Joseph, Lal, Arjun Ashokan, Balu Varghese, and Ganapathi S Poduval in important roles.

The film was produced by Lakshmi Warrier, Ganesh Menon, Sajith Kookal, and Shawn Antony under the banner of Cheers Entertainment and was released on November 19, 2021. It received widespread critical acclaim for its performances, clean humour, emotional depth, story, and Chidambaram's direction.

== Plot ==
Joymon is a nurse working in a cold and desolate part of Canada. He grapples with persistent loneliness and finds comfort in calls to his family and childhood friends in Kerala. He decides to celebrate his 30th birthday with a big party in Kerala and invites all of his old school friends. Faizal, one of his friends who is now a skin doctor, helps him organize it. Faizal asks another friend, Sambath, a car dealer, to host the party at his house. Initially reluctant, Sambath later agrees assuming that the birthday party will be a small affair. They pick Joymon from the airport and head to Sambath's house where Sambath's mother, sister and grandmother also live. Soon other friends like Ratheesh, a Malayalam TV serial actor, Sajith (Saji), a gangster along with his sidekick Kannan and Sambath's childhood sweetheart Ammu join the party. Contrary to Sambath's assumption, Joymon has planned a grand party including fireworks, lighting decorations, liquor, DJ and so on. He has even hired Akshay who is an event coordinator.

While the party starts to get going, an older man named Ittichan, who lives in the house opposite to Sambath's has a heart attack and passes away. This leads to the unusual situation where there is a birthday party celebration in one house and a funeral being planned in the other house. Moreover, Ittichan's younger daughter Jesna is heavily pregnant with her due date in a week. Sambath is unsympathetic, since he has had conflicts in the past with Monichan, Ittichan's estranged son. Soon, Ittichan's younger brother Kochukunju as well as Monichan and his friends arrive at Ittichan's house to plan the funeral. The sombre event at one house clashes with the loud and brightly lit party at the other house. Akshay decides to help with the funeral as well and becomes the event coordinator for both the events and runs back and forth between the two.

Just as Ittichan's older daughter Saramma, a nun, somehow convinces Monichan to give his father the last kiss at midnight, Joymon sets off fireworks celebrating his birthday which causes anger in the grieving house. Sambath and Faizal feel this went out of hand; they fight with Joymon and apologise to Kochukunju for the disturbance. Kochukunju recognises Ratheesh as a big actor in one of the serials he watches; soon the guests from both events start to commingle with each other and start to understand each other. Faizal treats Jesna; Joymon and Monichan start to bond on no one understanding them. When Ittichan's will is read, they are surprised to hear that some property has been left to Sambath's grandmother. They rush to clarify things and find her dead in her bed.

They discover an old photograph of Ittichan and faded letters in the grandmother's possession and discover that the two were star-crossed lovers in the early 1970s. Due to their different faiths, they were not able to marry each other but nevertheless continued to love each other from afar. Ittichan fondly called her Jan-E-Man (Darling in Urdu). Monichan and Sambath get into a fight along with their friends after Monichan's friend Chacko hits Sambath and in retaliation Sajith accidentally hits Kochukunju. During this, Ittichan's younger daughter Jesna goes into labour and Faizal as well as the women in both the houses work together to deliver the baby. She finally gives birth to a healthy baby girl and everyone is overjoyed when Monichan names her Jan-E-Man and Joymon wishing her happy birthday. The movie ends showing Ittichan and Sambath's grandmother being buried in adjacent graves surrounded by their family and friends.

== Cast ==
- Basil Joseph as Joymon, a Non-Resident Indian, lives in Canada.
- Ganapathi S Poduval as Dr. Faisal Khan, Joymon's friend
- Arjun Ashokan as Sambath, Faisal's friend
- Sruthy Sathyan as Aishwarya, Sampath's sister
- Ganga Meera as Sambath's mother
- Unni Nair as Plathottathil Itty Avara "Ittichan", Sambath's elderly neighbour
  - Asif Ali as young Ittichan (voice only)
- Lal as Plathottathil Kochukunju, Ittichan's brother
- Remya Suresh as Nancy, Kochukunju's wife
- Balu Varghese as Plathottathil Monichan, Ittichan's son
- Gilu Joseph as Sister Saramma, Ittichan's elder daughter
- Riya Saira as Jesna, Ittichan's younger daughter
- Prapti Elizabeth as Ammu, Sampath's love interest
- Abhiram Radhakrishnan as Akshay Kumar, an event coordinator
- Chembil Ashokan as Manikunju, Ittichan's relative
- Sajin Gopu as Sajith Lal "Saji Vypin", a gangster
- Sarath Sabha as Kannan, Saji's sidekick
- Prashant Murali as Chacko, Monichan's friend
- Maneesha K.S. as Police constable neighbour

== Production ==
The movie marks the directorial debut of Chidambaram. The movie was made during the COVID-19 pandemic and its shooting started on 9 September 2020, and it was wrapped up in 35 days. It was shot in Kochi and Kashmir. Arjun Ashokan and Balu Varghese were part of the project from the get-go.

Vishnu Thandassery, who had worked in many films as a still photographer has debuted as a cinematographer through this film. Bijibal composed the background score for this movie. Kiran Das is the editor and Vinesh Bangalan is the art director of the film. R. G. Vayandan did the makeup and Mahser Hamsa arranged the costumes for the movie. The film was co-written by Ganapathi S Poduval who is the brother of the director.

== Marketing ==
The teaser of the movie was released by Dulquer Salmaan on 9 July 2021. Mohanlal, Tovino Thomas and Asif Ali released the first look poster of the film on 30 August 2021. The song Mizhiyoram from the 1980 Malayalam movie Manjil Virinja Pookkal was remastered in this film. The song was released by Manju Warrier on 3 November 2021. The official trailer of the film was released on 11 November 2021, by Mammootty through his official Facebook Page. The satellite right of the movie was grabbed by Surya Tv.

== Release ==
The movie was released in theatres of Kerala on 19 November 2021. Initially the movie had previews in 90 release centers, the movie was welcomed by a low initial response but after increased demand from the audience, the movie was previewed in 150 release centers across Kerala after a week. The movie was released outside Kerala on 10 December 2021.

== Reception ==
The movie received critical acclaim from the critics as well as from the audience. The Times of India gave a rating of 3.5 on 5 and wrote that, "This is a film that will make you both laugh and cry at the same time, offering insights into the meaning of happiness, togetherness, friendship and more. This movie is suited for those who like situational comedy, real-life people and quirky connections." Sajin Srijith of The New Indian Express commented that, "Jan.E.Man is a welcome bundle of laughs, emotions, and other surprises. The film finds a neat balance between its laughs and intense emotions." Firstpost rated the movie with 3.5 on 5 and exclaimed, "The outcome of Chidambaram's confident direction and a sharp script is an intelligent and entertaining film." Appreciating the script and the performances of the movie S. R. Praveen of The Hindu wrote that, "Jan-E-man, with its inventive script and earnest performances, hits all the right notes."

Vishal Menon of Film Companion said that, "Jan.E.Man is a movie that you would have got when Lijo Jose Pellissery had co-directed Ee.Ma.Yau. with Rafi Mecartin. The movie is an original, if uneven, dark comedy with an excellent ensemble." Sify gave a rating of 3.5 on 5 and wrote that, "Jan-E-Man is A feel good entertainer. Lal and Balu Varghese shines as Kochu Kunju and Monichan respectively. Arjun Ashokan, Ganapathi, Basil Joseph, Riya Saira and Siddharth Menon are impressive." Malayala Manorama appreciated the movie by writing that, "Janeman is a procession of laughter." OTT Play gives a rating of 3.5 on 5 and writes that, "Jan.E.Man movie review: Basil Joseph, Arjun Ashokan -starrer takes you on a rollercoaster ride of emotions."
