= Ganapathi S. Poduval =

Indian actor

- Ganapathi in 2026
- Occupation: Actor
- Years active: 2007–present
- Relatives: Chidambaram S. Poduval (brother)

Ganapathi S. Poduval (born 15 March 1995), known mononymously as Ganapathi, is an Indian actor who works in the Malayalam film industry. He is well-known for his roles as child artist in the films Vinodayathra (2007) and Pranchiyettan & The Saint (2010). He also played a major role in the film Chithrasalabhangalude Veedu (2008).

== Film career ==
Ganapathi started his film career by doing dubbing for Santhosh Sivan’s movie Anandabhadram. Later, Santosh introduced him as a child actor through the Bilingual film Before The Rains. He got a breakthrough in his acting career after appearing in the film Vinodayathra, written and directed by Sathyan Anthikkad.

He also got the starring role in the children's film Chithrashalabhangalude Veedu, directed by Krishnakumar and branched out into Hindi with The Waiting Room, directed by Maneej Premnath.

He essayed roles as child artist in various movies like Pranchiyettan & The Saint, Mallu Singh and Alibhai. After doing various character roles in movies like Kamattipaadam, Puthan Panam and Chunkzz, he went on to do the lead role in the Malayalam movie titled Vallikudilile Vellakkaran.

He was later seen in Mr. & Ms. Rowdy, directed by Jeethu Joseph. In COVID pandemic situation he directed a shortfilm titled "Onnu Chirikoo". He then acted in Mridul Nair’s Malayalam web series titled Instagraamam, along with Deepak Parambol. He starred in and co-wrote Jan.E.Man (2021), directed and written by his elder brother Chidambaram.

Additionally, Ganapathi was part of the third highest grossing Malayalam film, Manjummel Boys, directed by his brother Chidambaram.

== Filmography ==
Key
†	Denotes films that have not yet been released

- Note: All films are in Malayalam language unless otherwise noted.

Year	Title	Role	Notes	Ref.
2007	Before the Rains	Boy #2	English-Malayalam film	
2007	Vinodayathra	Ganapathi		
2007	Ali Bhai	Ganapathi		
2007	Ayur Rekha	Jacob's son		
2008	Chithrasalabhangalude Veedu	Muththu		
2008	Innathe Chintha Vishayam	Kamala's brother		
2008	Lollipop	Young Franko		
2008	Pakal Nakshatrangal	Young Aadi Sidharthan		
2009	Samayam	Appu		
2010	Pranchiyettan & the Saint	Pauly		
2010	The Waiting Room	Tea stall boy	Hindi film	
2011	Achan	Appu	Short film	
2012	Spirit	Molester		
2012	Mallu Singh	Hari		
2013	Black Butterfly	Sameer		
2013	August Club	Benny		
2015	Tharakangale Saakshi	Freddy		
2016	Kammati Paadam	Charlie		
2016	Kavi Uddheshichathu..?	Shukkoor		
2017	Munthirivallikal Thalirkkumbol	Jithin		
2017	Honey Bee 2: Celebrations	Freddy		
2017	Honey Bee 2.5	Himself		
2017	Georgettan's Pooram	Kichu		
2017	Puthan Panam	Shine		
2017	Chunkzz	Riyas		
2018	Uncle	Sam		
2018	Padayottam	Salaman		
2018	Vallikudilile Vellakkaran	Sam Joseph		
2019	Mr & Mrs Rowdy	Asif		
2019	Under World	Frog watcher	Cameo appearance	
2020	Onnu Chirikku	Himself	Short film as director	
2020	Instagramam	Society Dutt	Web series	
2021	Jan.E.Man	Dr. Faizal	Also co-writer	
2021	Keshu Ee Veedinte Nadhan	Vivek		
2022	Salute	Thampi's son		
2022	Gold	Jaffar		
2022	Thattassery Koottam	Abbas		
2023	Oh My Darling	Josemon	Cameo appearance	
2023	Sulaikha Manzil	Adhil		
2023	Nalla Nilavulla Rathri	Aneesh		
2023	Padmini	Rahul		
2024	Manjummel Boys	Krishnakumar aka "Kannan"		
2024	Nadikar	David's friend	Cameo appearance	
2024	Mandakini	Sujith Vasu		
2024	Adios Amigo	Bintopi		
2024	Oru Kattil Oru Muri			
2025	Alappuzha Gymkhana	Deepak Panikkar		
2025	Ambalamukkile Visheshangal			
2026	Prakambanam	Sidharth		
2026	Dhoomakethu	Anti, Kuttan's friend		
2026	Avaraachan & Sons			
