= Sunil Ibrahim =

Indian screenwriter, film producer and film director

- Born: 12 December 1978 (age 47); Madanvila, Kerala
- Occupations: Film director Screenwriter; Film producer
- Years active: 2012 - present

Sunil Ibrahim is an Indian screenwriter, film producer and film director. His first film was Chapters in 2012, where Nivin Pauly and Sreenivasan played the lead roles. His second movie was Arikil Oraal released in 2013.

== Film career ==
Sunil Ibrahim started his film career with the movie Chapters. His second movie was Arikil Oraal where Indrajith Sukumaran, Nivin Pauly and Remya Nambeesan played the leads. It was a psychological thriller movie. Y movie Released on 17 November 2017 with 40 new faces and Alencier Ley Lopez received good reviews and ran successfully in theaters. His fourth movie is "Roy" where Suraj Venjaramood, Sija Rose, Shine Tom Chacko and Jins Baskar are playing the lead roles.

== Filmography ==
Year	Film	Cast	Notes
2012	Chapters	Nivin Pauly, Sreenivasan, Lena Abilash	Director and writer
2013	Arikil Oraal	Nivin Pauly, Indrajith, Remya Nambeesan	Director and writer
2015	Olappeeppi	Biju Menon, Paris Laxmi	Producer only
2017	Y	About 40 'new faces' with Alancier Lay	Director and writer
2022	Roy	Suraj Venjaramood, Sija Rose, Shine Tom Chacko, Jins Baskar	Director and writer
TBA	The Third Murder	Saiju Kurup, Vinay Forrt, Indrans	Director and writer
