= Kunchacko Boban filmography =

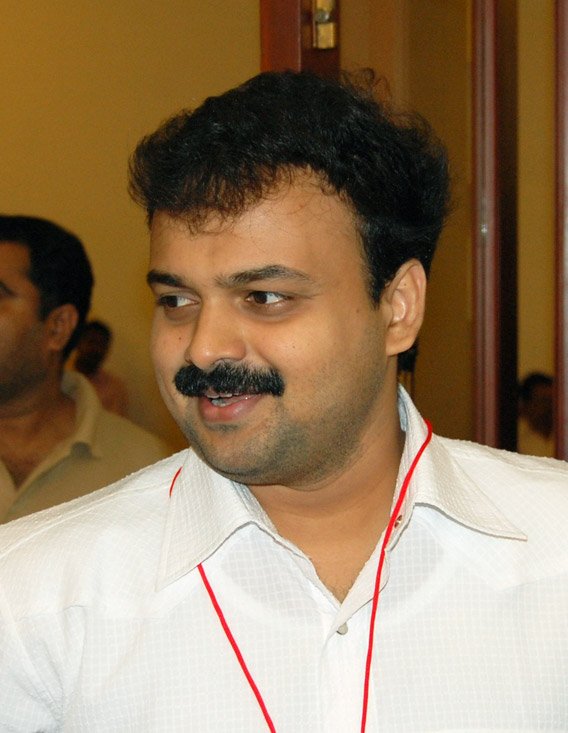
Boban in 2008

Kunchacko Boban is an Indian actor, producer, and businessman who works in Malayalam films and has acted in more than 100 films over the period of more than two decades and has received several awards including the Kerala State Film Awards. He started acting at the age of 5 in the Fazil directed drama Dhanya as a child artist in a small role and it was produced by his father Boban Kunchacko. He debuted as an adult with a leading role in Fazil's 1997 romantic drama Aniyathipravu which became one of the highest-grossing Malayalam film of the year, establishing him as a bankable actor in the industry.

In 2016, Kunchacko produced the comedy drama Kochauvva Paulo Ayyappa Coelho through Udaya Studios, in the process of reviving the studio after a 30-year hiatus.

== Films ==
Key
†	Denotes films that have not yet been released

- All films are in Malayalam language unless otherwise noted.

List of Kunchacko Boban film credits
Year	Title	Role	Notes
1981	Dhanya		Child artist
1997	Aniyathipravu	Sudhish Kumar aka Sudhi	
1998	Nakshathrathaarattu	Sunil	
1998	Mayilpeelikkavu	Krishnanunni & Manu	Double role
1998	Harikrishnans	Sudarshanan	
1999	Prem Poojari	Prem Jacob	
1999	Chandamama	Unni	
1999	Mazhavillu	Mahesh Menon	
1999	Niram	Aby	
2000	Sathyam Sivam Sundaram	Chandrahasan	
2000	Priyam	Benny	
2000	Ingane Oru Nilapakshi	Charlie	
2000	Sahayathrikakku Snehapoorvam	Saji	
2001	Dosth	Vijay	
2001	Narendra Makan Jayakanthan Vaka	Jayakanthan	
2002	Puthooramputhri Unniyarcha	Aromalunni	
2002	Snehithan	Joji (Anand)	
2002	Kalyanaraman	Unni	
2003	Kasthoorimann	Sajan Joseph Alukka	
2003	Thillana Thillana	Himself	Cameo appearance
2003	Maayaamohithachandran	Sarathchandran	Unreleased film
2003	Swapnam Kondu Thulabharam	Aniyan Kuttan	
2003	Swapnakoodu	Deepu Narayan	
2003	Mullavalliyum Thenmavum	Shelly	
2004	Jalothsavam	Alackal Chandran	
2004	Ee Snehatheerathu	Vishwanathan	Kerala State Special Jury Award
2005	Iruvattam Manavaatti	Dr. Goutham	
2005	Hridayathil Sookshikkan	Sreenath	
2005	Junior Senior	Kichu	
2005	Five Fingers	Manu	
2006	Kilukkam Kilukilukkam	Roy	
2008	Twenty:20	Sabu	Special appearance in the song "Hey Deewana"
2008	LollyPop	Dr. Abey	
2009	Gulumal: The Escape	Ravi Varma	
2010	Mummy & Me	Rahul	Asianet Film Awards for Best Star Pair with Archana Kavi
2010	Sakudumbam Shyamala	Akash	
2010	Elsamma Enna Aankutty	Unnikrishnan aka Paalunni	Nominated – Filmfare Award for Best Actor – Malayalam
2010	Oridathoru Postman	Reghu Nandan	
2010	Four Friends	Suriya	
2011	Traffic	Dr. Abel Thariyan	
2011	Makeup Man	Himself	Cameo appearance
2011	Race	Dr. Abey John	
2011	Seniors	Rex Immanuel	SIIMA Award for Best Actor in a Negative Role - Malayalam; Asianet Film Awards – Youth Icon of the Year (various films of 2011)
2011	Three Kings	Ramanunni Raja aka Ram	
2011	Sevenes	Shyam	
2011	Doctor Love	Vinayachandran aka Vinayan	
2011	Sandwich	Sai	
2012	Spanish Masala	Rahul	
2012	Ordinary	Iravikuttan Pillai aka Iravi	
2012	Mallu Singh	Ani	50th film
2012	101 Weddings	Krishnankutty aka Krish	
2012	Poppins	Major Prathap Varma	
2013	Romans	Akash (Fr. Paul)	Asianet Film Awards – Special Jury Award
2013	3 Dots	Vishnu	
2013	God for Sale: Bhakthi Prasthanam	Prasannan Nair (Poornanada Swami)	
2013	Pullipulikalum Aattinkuttiyum	Chakkaattutharayil Gopan	Asianet Film Awards – Special Jury Award
2013	Kadhaveedu	Raj Karthik	
2013	Vishudhan	Fr. Sunny	
2014	Konthayum Poonoolum	Krishnan	
2014	Polytechnic	Pauly	
2014	Law Point	Adv. Sathya Mohan	
2014	How Old Are You?	Rajeev Narayanan	Asianet Film Awards – Youth Icon of the Year (various films of 2014)
2014	Bhaiyya Bhaiyya	Babumon	
2014	Cousins	Sam	
2015	Chirakodinja Kinavukal	Thayyalkaaran (Tailor), UK Kaaran (NRI), Gulf Kaaran (NRI)	Triple role, Nominated – IIFA Utsavam Award for Best Actor in a Negative Role
2015	Madhura Naranga	Jeevan	
2015	Jamna Pyari	Vassoottan	
2015	Lord Livingstone 7000 Kandi	Philipose John Varkey	
2015	Rajamma @ Yahoo	Michael Rajamma	
2015	Valiya Chirakulla Pakshikal	Photographer	
2016	Vettah	Melvin Philip	
2016	Valliyum Thetti Pulliyum Thetti	Vinayan	
2016	Shajahanum Pareekuttiyum	Pranav Menon	
2016	School Bus	S.I Gopakumar	
2016	Kochauvva Paulo Ayyappa Coelho	Kochauvva	Also producer
2017	Take Off	Shaheed	Nominated – Filmfare Award for Best Supporting Actor - Malayalam; Asianet Critics Award for Best Actor
2017	Ramante Eden Thottam	Ram Menon aka Raman	Asianet Critics Award for Best Actor
2017	Varnyathil Aashanka	Koutta Sivan	Asianet Critics Award for Best Actor
2018	Diwanjimoola Grand Prix	Sajan Joseph IAS	
2018	Shikkari Shambhu	Peelipose aka Peeli	
2018	Poomaram	Himself	Cameo appearance
2018	Kuttanadan Marpappa	John Paul a.k.a. Marpappa	
2018	Panchavarnathatha	MLA Kalesh	
2018	Mangalyam Thanthunanena	Royichan	
2018	Johny Johny Yes Appa	Johny	
2018	Thattumpurath Achuthan	Achuthan	
2019	Allu Ramendran	Ramendran	
2019	Virus	Dr. Suresh Rajan	
2020	Anjaam Pathiraa	Dr. Anwar Hussain	
2021	Mohan Kumar Fans	Krishnan Unni	
2021	Nayattu	CPO Praveen Micheal	
2021	Nizhal	John Baby	
2021	Bheemante Vazhi	Sanju a.k.a. Bheeman	
2022	Pada	Rakesh Kanhangad	
2022	Nna Thaan Case Kodu	Kozhummal Rajeevan	Also producer
2022	Ottu / Rendagam	Kichu / David (Dawood)	Malayalam-Tamil bilingual film
2022	Ariyippu	Hareesh	Also producer
2023	Pakalum Paathiravum	Michael	
2023	Enthada Saji	St. Rocky	
2023	2018	Shaji Punnoose	100th film
2023	Padmini	Rameshan	
2023	Chaaver	Ashokan	
2024	Sureshanteyum Sumalathayudeyum Hrudayahariyaya Pranayakadha	Kozhummal Rajeevan	Cameo appearance
2024	Grrr	Rejimon Nadar	
2024	Bougainvillea	Dr. Royce John	
2025	Officer on Duty	DYSP/ CI Harishankar	
2026	Oru Durooha Saahacharyathil	Sethu	
2026	Patriot	Michael Devassy	
2026	Unmadham	CPO Shelly	
2026	Bachelor Party D'eux	Dheeraj Prabhu	
2026	Hail Mary †	TBA	
