= 53rd Kerala State Film Awards =

State awards for Malayalam films of 2022

- Awarded for: Best works in Malayalam cinema in a select year
- Date: 21 July 2023
- Location: Thiruvananthapuram
- Country: India
- Presented by: Kerala State Chalachitra Academy
- First award: 1969

Highlights
- Most wins: Nna Thaan Case Kodu (7)
- Website: keralafilm.com

The 53rd Kerala State Film Awards, presented by the Kerala State Chalachitra Academy, was announced by Saji Cherian, the Minister of Cultural Affairs, Kerala, on 21 July 2023.

== Writing category ==
=== Jury ===
• K. C. Narayanan (chairman)
• K. Rekha	• M. A. Dileep
• C. Ajoy

=== Awards ===
Each award recipient was given a cash prize, certificate and statuette.

Name of award	Title of work	Awardee(s)	Cash prize
Best Book on Cinema	Cinemayude Bhavanadeshangal	C. S. Venkiteswaran	₹30,000
Best Article on Cinema	Punasthapanam Enna Mahendrajalam	Sabu Pravadas	₹20,000

=== Special Mention ===
All recipients receive a certificate and statuette.

Name of award	Title	Awardee(s)
Book on Cinema	No award	No award
Article on Cinema	No award	No award

== Film category ==
=== Jury ===
Final jury
• Gautam Ghose (chairman)
• Nemam Pushparaj	• K. M. Madhusudhanan
• Hari Nair	• D. Yuvaraj
• Gautami	• Jency Gregory
• C. Ajoy

Second jury
• K. M. Madhusudhanan (chairman)
• B. Rakesh	• Sajas Rahman
• Vinod Sukumaran	• C. Ajoy

First jury
• Nemam Pushparaj (chairman)
• V. J. James	• K. M. Sheeba
• Roy P. Thomas	• C. Ajoy

=== Awards ===
All award recipients receive a cash prize, certificate and statuette.

Name of award	Title of film	Awardee(s)	Cash prize
Best Film	Nanpakal Nerathu Mayakkam	Director: Lijo Jose Pellissery	₹200,000
Best Film	Nanpakal Nerathu Mayakkam	Producer: George Sebastian	₹200,000
Second Best Film	Adithattu	Director: Jijo Antony	₹150,000
Second Best Film	Adithattu	Producer: Godjo J.	₹150,000
Best Director	Ariyippu	Mahesh Narayanan	₹200,000
Best Actor	Nanpakal Nerathu Mayakkam	Mammootty	₹100,000
Best Actress	Rekha	Vincy Aloshious	₹100,000
Best Character Actor	Nna Thaan Case Kodu	P. P. Kunhikrishnan	₹50,000
Best Character Actress	Saudi Vellakka	Devi Varma	₹50,000
Special Jury Award	Nna Thaan Case Kodu	Kunchacko Boban (awarded for acting)	₹25,000
Special Jury Award	Appan	Alencier Ley Lopez (awarded for acting)	₹25,000
Best Child Artist	Pallotty 90s Kids	Davinchi Santhosh (Male category)	₹50,000
Best Child Artist	Vazhakku	Thanmaya Sol A. (Female category)	₹50,000
Best Story	Pada	Kamal K. M.	₹50,000
Best Cinematography	Ela Veezha Poonchira	Manesh Madhavan	₹25,000
Best Cinematography	Vazhakku	Chandru Selvaraj	₹25,000
Best Screenplay (Original)	Nna Thaan Case Kodu	Ratheesh Balakrishnan Poduval	₹50,000
Best Screenplay (Adaptation)	Oru Thekkan Thallu Case	Rajesh Kumar R.	₹50,000
Best Lyrics	Viddikalude Mash ("Thiramalayanu Njan")	Rafeeq Ahammed	₹50,000
Best Music Director (songs)	Pathonpatham Noottandu ("Mazhilpeeli Ilakunnu" and "Karumban Inningu"); Ayisha (All songs)	M. Jayachandran	₹50,000
Best Music Director (score)	Nna Thaan Case Kodu	Dawn Vincent	₹50,000
Best Male Singer	Pallotty 90s Kids ("Kanave Mizhiyil Unare")	Kapil Kapilan	₹50,000
Best Female Singer	Pathonpatham Noottandu ("Mayipeeli Ilakunnu Kanna")	Mridula Warrier	₹50,000
Best Editor	Thallumaala	Nishadh Yusuf	₹50,000
Best Art Director	Nna Thaan Case Kodu	Jyothish Shankar	₹50,000
Best Sync Sound	Ariyippu	Vaishak P. V.	₹50,000
Best Sound Mixing	Nna Thaan Case Kodu	Vipin Nair	₹50,000
Best Sound Design	Ela Veezha Poonchira	Ajayan Adat	₹50,000
Best Processing Lab / Colourist	Ela Veezha Poonchira	After Studios / Robert Lang	₹25,000
Best Processing Lab / Colourist	Vazhakku	iGene - DI and VFX / R. Rangarajan	₹25,000
Best Makeup Artist	Bheeshma Parvam	Ronnex Xavier	₹50,000
Best Costume Designer	Saudi Vellakka	Manjusha Radhakrishnan	₹50,000
Best Dubbing Artist	Pathonpatham Noottandu (Character: Padaveedan Thampy)	Shobi Thilakan (Male category)	₹50,000
Best Dubbing Artist	Saudi Vellakka (Character: Ayisha Rowther)	Pauly Valsan (Female category)	₹50,000
Best Choreography	Thallumaala	Shobi Paul Raj	₹50,000
Best Film with Popular Appeal and Aesthetic Value	Nna Thaan Case Kodu	Director: Ratheesh Balakrishnan Poduval	₹100,000
Best Film with Popular Appeal and Aesthetic Value	Nna Thaan Case Kodu	Producer: Santhosh T. Kuruvilla	₹100,000
Best Debut Director	Ela Veezha Poonchira	Shahi Kabir	₹100,000
Best Children's Film	Pallotty 90's Kids	Director: Jithin Raj	₹100,000
Best Children's Film	Pallotty 90's Kids	Producer: Sajid Yahiya	₹150,000
Best Visual Effects	Vazhakku	Anish D. Sumesh Gopal	₹50,000

=== Special Mention ===
All recipients receive a certificate and statuette.

Name of award	Title of film	Awardee(s)	Awarded for
Special Mention	Ilavarambu	Biswajith S.	Direction
Special Mention	Vettapattikalum Ottakkarum	Rarish G. Kurup	Direction

=== Special Award in Any Category for Women/Transgender ===
All recipients receive a cash prize, certificate, and statuette.

Name of award	Title of film	Awardee(s)	Awarded for	Cash prize
Special Award in Any Category for Women/Transgender	B 32 Muthal 44 Vare	Shruthi Sharanyam	Direction	₹50,000
