= Oru Durooha Saahacharyathil =

2026 Malayalam-language comedy thriller film

- Theatrical release poster
- Directed by: Ratheesh Balakrishnan Poduval
- Written by: Ratheesh Balakrishnan Poduval
- Produced by: Listin Stephen; Kunchacko Boban
- Starring: Kunchacko Boban; Dileesh Pothan; Sajin Gopu; Chidambaram S. Poduval
- Cinematography: Arjun Sethu
- Edited by: Manoj Kannoth
- Music by: Dawn Vincent
- Production companies: Magic Frames; Udaya Pictures
- Distributed by: Magic Frames
- Release date: 15 April 2026
- Running time: 135 minutes
- Country: India
- Language: Malayalam

Oru Durooha Saahacharyathil (transl. Under Mysterious Circumstances) is a 2026 Indian Malayalam-language mystery comedy thriller film, written and directed by Ratheesh Balakrishnan Poduval. The film is produced by Listin Stephen and Kunchacko Boban under the banners of Magic Frames and Udaya Pictures, marking the first collaboration between the two celebrated production houses. It stars Kunchacko Boban, Dileesh Pothan, Sajin Gopu and Chidambaram in the lead roles. Set against an otherwise ordinary world, the film follows a health center worker whose quiet life takes an unexpected turn when a mysterious stranger enters his home, setting in motion a strange chain of events where secrets surface, reality takes unexpected twists, and nothing is ever quite as it seems. The film was shot in Wayanad district.

The film was released on 15 April 2026 and received mixed reviews from critics.

== Plot ==
Sethu is a mild-mannered employee at the Janakiya Arogya Kendram in Tholpetty, Wayanad. A regular radio listener and a man of simple habits, he spends his time caring for his differently abled brother Madhu. His quiet life is disrupted when an enigmatic stranger Rajendra Prasad enters his household, pulling him into a web of secrets, suspicion, and rising tension. As Sethu attempts to navigate these "mysterious circumstances," he finds himself at the centre of a situation that is as humorous as perilous.

== Cast ==
- Kunchacko Boban as Sethu
- Dileesh Pothan as Madhu
- Sajin Gopu as Rajendra Prasad
- Chidambaram S. Poduval as Armiyas
- Sharanya R. Nair as Mini
- Divya Vishwanath as Renuka
- Pooja Mohanraj as Valsala, Madhu's wife
- Jaffar Idukki as Jaffer Parakkadi
- Rajesh Madhavan as himself (cameo)
- Sudheesh as Dr. Sasidhran
- P. P. Kunhikrishnan as Dr. Rajan Panicker
- Beena Kodakkad as Nalini
- Sudheer C.K. as Kannan Nambiar

== Production ==
=== Development ===
The project was officially announced in late 2024, marking the third collaboration between director Ratheesh Balakrishnan Poduval and Kunchacko Boban after Nna Thaan Case Kodu (2022) and Sureshanteyum Sumalathayudeyum Hrudayahariyaya Pranayakadha (2024). The film's title, which translates to "In a Mysterious Circumstance," was revealed alongside a quirky first-look poster in July 2025.

=== Filming ===
Principal photography began on November 19, 2024, in the Wayanad district of Kerala. The film was shot extensively in locations such as Thirunelli and Tholpetty to capture the misty, rural atmosphere required for the mystery-thriller elements. The production wrapped on March 8, 2025.

== Music ==
The film's soundtrack and background score are composed by Dawn Vincent. The first single, titled "Njan Alkali," was released in early April 2026 and gained significant traction for its retro-inspired arrangement.

== Release ==
The film is scheduled for a theatrical release on April 15, 2026, coinciding with the Vishu festival season. During the promotional campaign, Kunchacko Boban revealed that the film contains several Easter eggs and references to his debut film, Aniyathipraavu (1997). The film’s digital rights have been acquired by Netflix and started streaming from May 13th.

== Reception ==
=== Critical reception ===
S. R. Praveen of The Hindu wrote that the film "loses rhythm in the last act as the director trades well-written humour and heartfelt moments for shock value" and wrote, "Oru Durooha Saahacharyathil serves up enough warmth and intrigue, but just not enough to make it an unforgettable film."

Vishal Menon of The Hollywood Reporter India described the film as "widely eccentric, mildly entertaining" and wrote, "Oru Durooha Saahacharyathil remains an entertaining mix of highbrow satire at war with the coolest brand of crass comedy our cinema has to offer."

Vivek Santhosh of The New Indian Express rated the film 2.5/5 stars and wrote, "Despite committed performances, this character-driven drama that leans into thriller territory gradually loses clarity, resulting in an uneven experience that remains absorbing in parts yet ultimately unsatisfying."

Gopika Is of The Times of India rated the film 2.5/5 stars and wrote, "Overall, it is a film with a gripping premise, strong performances, and an engaging first half, but one that slightly loses its way in the latter portion."

Sreeju Sudhakaran of Rediff.com rated the film 2.5/5 stars and wrote that Oru Durooha Saahacharyathil has "a strong first half and compelling lead performances but struggles with an uneven third act".

Sajin Shrijith of The Week rated the film 2.5/5 stars and wrote that Oru Durooha Saahacharyathil "feels like parts of different movies stitched together. One is left with a feeling of numbness and, of course, many questions."

Anandu Suresh of The Indian Express rated the film 2/5 stars and wrote, "What keeps the psychological comedy thriller afloat is the splendid performances, especially by Dileesh Pothan and Kunchacko Boban."
