= Pennum Porattum =

2025 Malayalam Satirical Comedy film

- Theatrical release poster
- Directed by: Rajesh Madhavan
- Written by: P. T. Ravi Sankar
- Produced by: Santhosh T. Kuruvilla; Binu George Alexander; Sherin Rachel Santhosh
- Starring: Dinesh Peppo; Satheesh Pulikka; Raina Radhakrishnan; Sanooj Alanaloor
- Cinematography: Sabin Uralikandy
- Edited by: Chaman Chakko
- Music by: Dawn Vincent
- Distributed by: Moon Shoot Entertainments
- Release dates: November 2025 (IFFI); 13 February 2026 (India)
- Running time: 119 minutes
- Country: India
- Language: Malayalam

Pennum Porattum (transl. Girl and the fools Parade) is a 2025 Indian Malayalam-language dark comedy-drama film written by P. T. Ravi Sankar and directed by Rajesh Madhavan in his directorial debut. Produced by Santhosh T. Kuruvilla under the banner STK Frames, the film features an ensemble cast of over 100 actors, most of them newcomers drawn from the Palakkad villages where it was shot. The title references porattu, a form of satirical folk theatre traditionally performed in the Palakkad region of Kerala. The film was released on February 13, 2026 and received positive reviews from critics.

== Plot ==
The story unfolds in the fictional village of Pattada, where decades ago, residents gave up arms to broker peace. When a private conversation between a young woman named Charulatha (Raina Radhakrishnan) and Kumar (Dinesh Pe Po) is overheard and shared on community WhatsApp groups, the village erupts into a moral frenzy to shame her. Simultaneously, Baburaj's pet dog Suttu escapes from his cage and is falsely rumoured to be rabid, triggering a parallel mob chase. The film intercuts between these two hunts, the first one targeting a woman's dignity and the second one pursuing an innocent animal, using the escalating chaos to expose the irrationality and hypocrisy of the villagers. Portions of the narrative are presented from Suttu's point of view through an internal monologue voiced by Tovino Thomas. The film explores themes of mob mentality, moral policing, and the contrast between animal innocence and human hypocrisy.

== Cast ==
- Dinesh Peppo as Kumar
- Satheesh Pulikka as Baburaj
- Raina Radhakrishnan as Charu
- Sanooj Alanaloor as Sujathan Sir
- Sumithra Krishnan as Sumithra, Kumar's mother
- Kunjappan O. V. P. as Kunjappan, Kumar's father
- Jayathi P. as Jayanthi, Charu's mother
- Devadas Mathoor as Dasan, Charu's father
- Rajesh Madhavan as Charuhasan, Charu's elder brother
- Vijayalakshmi as Sulu
- Varsha Valsan as Suma, Sulu's daughter
- Manoj Kumar N as the Vaidhyar
- Jessy Sahibh as Nimisha, Baburaj's mother
- Amal as Munz, Kumar's younger brother
- Suttu as Suttu, Baburaj's pet dog (voice over by Tovino Thomas)

== Production ==
The screenplay was written by P. T. Ravi Sankar, who had previously co-written Rani Padmini and Bheeshma Parvam. Rajesh Madhavan, previously known as a casting director and actor in films such as Kanakam Kaamini Kalaham and Nna Thaan Case Kodu, had worked as an associate director under Ratheesh Balakrishnan Poduval before making his directorial debut. The film was shot on location in Palakkad district villages, with cinematography by Sabin Uralikandy, editing by Chaman Chakko, and music composed by Dawn Vincent.

== Release ==
The film premiered at the 56th International Film Festival of India (IFFI) in Goa in November 2025, was screened at the 30th International Film Festival of Kerala (IFFK), and was released theatrically on 13 February 2026. The movie received a standing ovation at the IFFK. It was released theatrically on 13 February 2026 with a runtime of 120 minutes, slightly shorter than the 122-minute festival cut. Netflix had acquired the streaming rights before the theatrical release, making it one of the rare recent Malayalam films to secure an OTT deal before its cinema run.

== Reception ==
=== Critical reception ===
Vivek Santhosh of The New Indian Express rated the film 4/5 stars and wrote, "Pennum Porattum is a riotous comedy that blends chaos with compassion while holding up a mirror to collective frenzy."

Anandu Suresh of The Indian Express rated the film 3/5 stars and wrote, "Rajesh Madhavan's absurd comedy, despite its shortcomings, stands as a testament to the power of a director's conviction."

S. R. Praveen of The Hindu wrote, "In Pennum Porattum, Rajesh Madhavan makes his bold directorial debut, capturing the rollercoaster human behaviour with a blend of quirky humour and absurd situations."

Sukanya Shaji of The News Minute wrote, "Pennum Porattum tells a sharp, biting story of violence, desire, and control. The critique is wrapped in humour, but Rajesh Madhavan’s barb cuts deep. By the end, he asks a disarming question: are we truly kind, or are we only kind until things work the way we want them to?"

Vishal Menon of The Hollywood Reporter India described the film as 'a cattle-classy comedy with the most spectacular casting' and wrote, "It's impressive how first-time director Rajesh Madhavan—who also stars in the film—creates a multi-layered universe that feels distinctly original."

Swathi P. Ajith of Onmanorama wrote, "Ultimately, Pennum Porattum is a strong, biting satire that effectively skewers society's obsession with moral policing. But its familiarity and occasional overstatement slightly dilute the impact of what is otherwise a sharply observed social commentary
