= Jithin Raj =

Jithin Raj may refer to:

- Jithin Raj (film director)
- Jithin Raj (singer)
