= P. P. Kunhikrishnan =

Indian actor

- Born: 1973 (age 52–53); Thadiyan Kovval, Kasaragod, Kerala, India
- Occupation: Actor
- Years active: 2022-present
- Notable work: Nna Thaan Case Kodu

P. P. Kunhikrishnan is an Indian film actor who works predominantly in the Malayalam film industry. His debut film Nna Thaan Case Kodu (2022) was critically acclaimed for his role as a magistrate. He also won the Kerala State Film Award for Best Character Actor for his performance in this film.

== Personal life ==
P.P. Kunhikrishnan resides at Thadiyan Kovval near Udinoor in Kasaragod district.He retired as a Hindi teacher in Udinoor School and is also a member of Padne Grama Panchayat.

Kunhikrishnan's first film Nna Thaan Case Kodu Unniraja brought it to the cinema.Later, Rajesh Madhavan, the casting director of this film, selected him.

Kunhikrishnan's wife Saraswati Thadiyan Kovval is a teacher at Kovval School. Eldest son Sarang is in Merchant Navy. Second son Azad is studying in Chennai.

== Filmography ==
Year	Title	Role	Notes
2022	Nna Thaan Case Kodu	Magistrate	
2023	Madanolsavam	Chindan	
2023	Corona Papers		
2023	Kasargold	Comrade Narayanan	
2024	Guruvayoor Ambalanadayil	Kaitholapprambil Ramachandran	
2024	Vishesham	Rahulan Nair	
2025	Oru Jaathi Jathakam	Mambrath Raghavan	
2025	Samshayam	Bhaskaran	
2025	The Pet Detective	Astrologer	
2026	Pennu Case	Gangadharan	
2026	Prakambanam	Sidhu's grandfather	
2026	Oru Durooha Saahacharyathil	Dr. Rajan Panicker	

== Web series ==
Year	Title	Role	Platform	Notes
2024	Perilloor Premier League	Manikandan	Disney+ Hotstar	

== Television ==
Year	Title	Role	Channel	Notes
2026	Ee Puzhayum Kadannu	Aravindan	Asianet	
