= Niranjana Anoop =

Indian actress

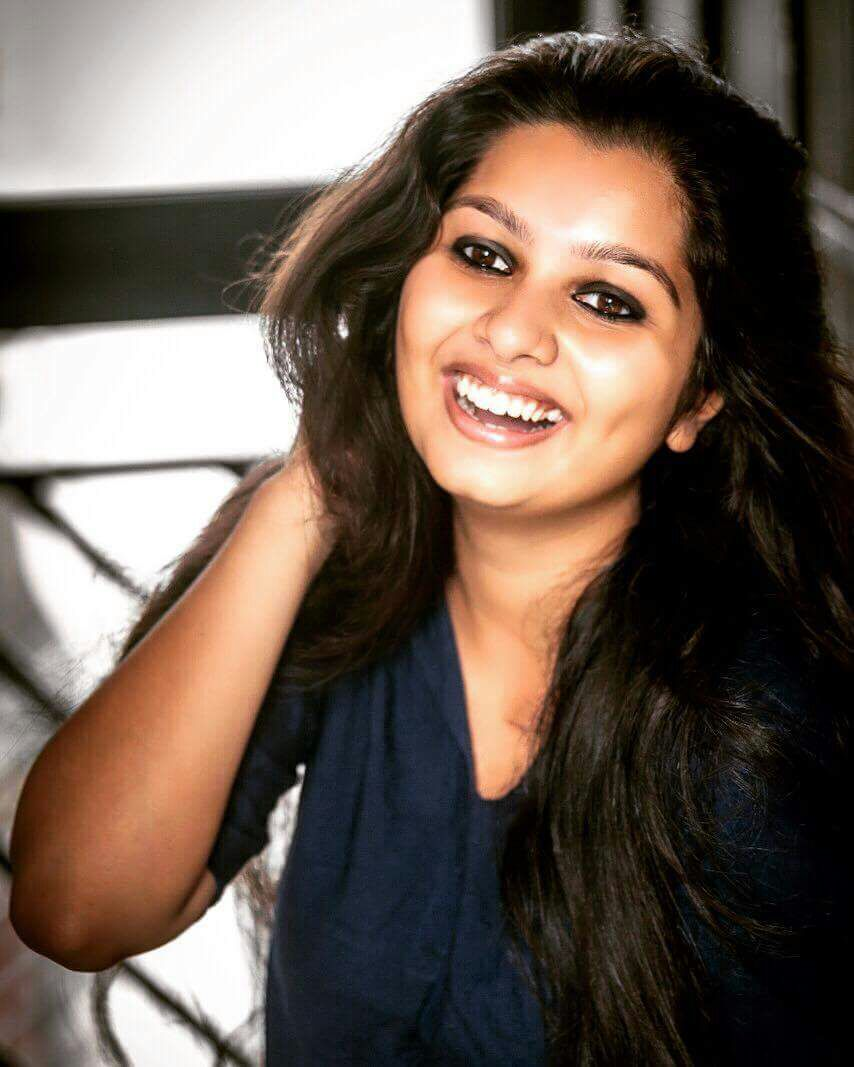
- Born: Kozhikode, Kerala, India
- Occupations: Actress; classical dancer
- Years active: 2015–present

Niranjana Anoop is an Indian actress who appears in Malayalam films. Niranjana is also a trained Bharatanatyam and Kuchipudi dancer.

== Career ==
Niranjana Anoop made her acting debut through the Malayalam film Loham (2015) directed by Ranjith. Her 2017 release includes the Malayalam language film Puthan Panam directed by Ranjith Balakrishnan, starring Mammootty and Iniya in the lead roles. She is associated with the 2018 Malayalam drama film Kala Viplavam Pranayam directed by Jithin Jithu, featuring Anson Paul, Saiju Kurup and Gayathri Suresh as lead characters. Her other 2018 releases include Ira and B. Tech.

== Filmography ==
Key
†	Denotes films that have not yet been released

=== Films ===
Year	Title	Role	Notes	Ref.
2015	Loham	Mythri	Debut film	
2017	Puthan Panam	Mia		
2017	Goodalochana	Fidha		
2017	C/O Saira Banu	Arudhathi		
2018	Ira	Jennifer		
2018	Kala Viplavam Pranayam	Aisha Ahmed		
2018	B.Tech	Ananya Viswanath		
2021	Chathur Mukham	Safiya		
2022	King Fish	Mallika and Vrinda		
2023	Enkilum Chandrike	Chandrika Raveendran		
2024	Thappinchuku Thiruguvadu Dhanyudu Sumathi		Telugu film	
2024	Turbo	Sithara		
2024	Pallotty 90's Kids	Unni's friend		
2024	Thrayam	Anjali Thomas		
2025	Padakkalam	Jeevika		
2026	Valathu Vashathe Kallan	Veena		
2026	Aval			
TBA	Mayan - Chapter 1 †	TBA		
TBA	The Secret of Women †	TBA		
TBA	Bermuda †	TBA		
TBA	Joy Full Enjoy†	TBA		

=== Short films ===
Year	Title	Director	Notes	Ref.
2020	K-nowledge	Grace Antony	Cameo	

=== Web series ===
Year	Title	Role	Language	Notes
2024	Nagendran's Honeymoons	Saavithri	Malayalam	Disney+ Hotstar
