= Manikandan R. Achari =

Indian actor

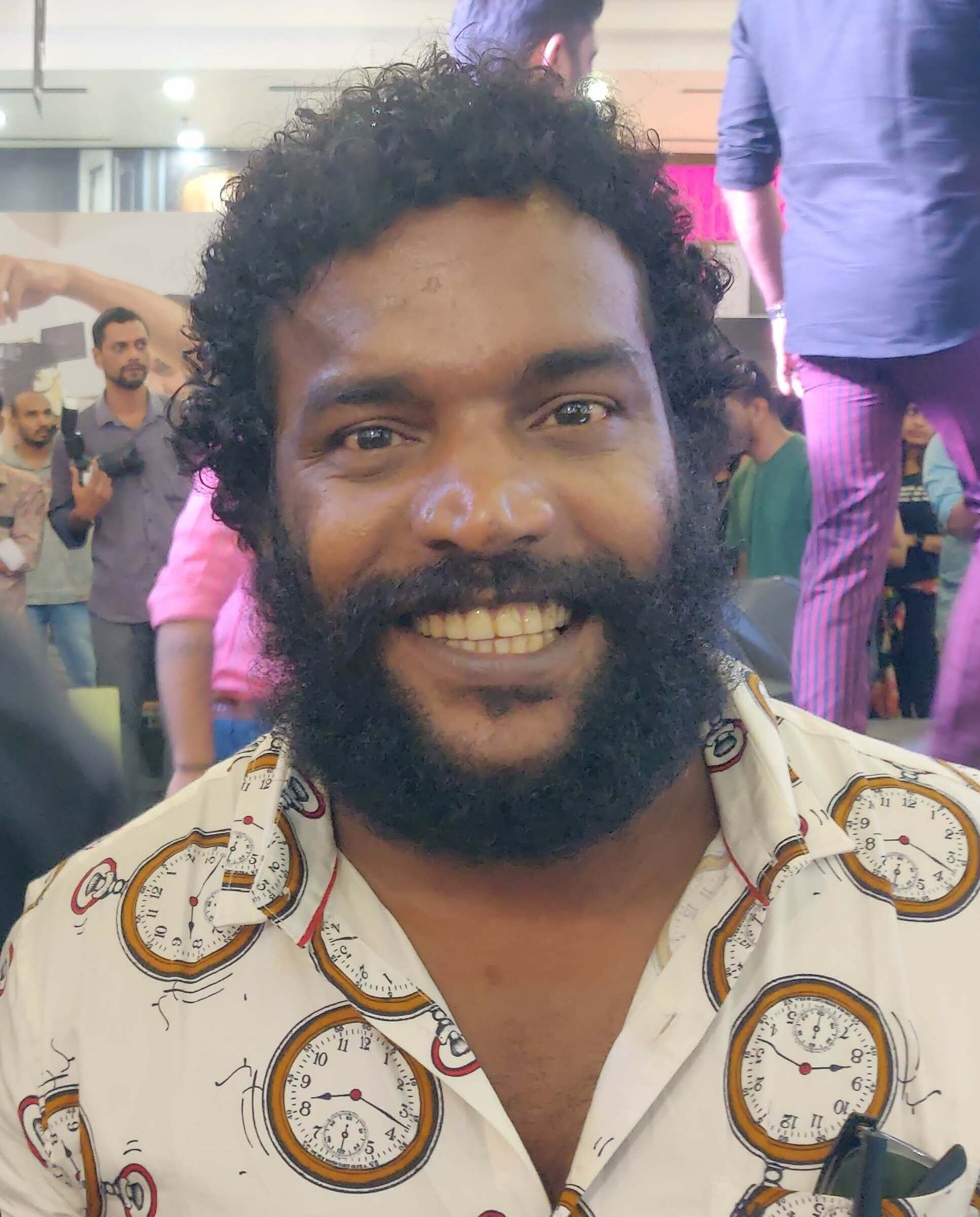
- Manikandan R. Achari at Lulu Mall Kochi in the Promotion event of Malayalam Film Pathonpatham Noottandu
- Born: Thrippunithura, Kerala, India
- Occupation: Actor
- Years active: 2016–present
- Spouse: Anjaly
- Children: 1 (Isai)
- Awards: Kerala State Film Awards

Manikandan R. Achari is an Indian actor who has appeared in many Malayalam films and theatre productions. He made his film debut in the 2016 film Kammatipaadam.

== Personal life ==
Achari was born in 1980 at Thrippunithura, Kerala. He married his girlfriend Anjali on April 26, 2020. The couple had a boy in 2021.

== Awards and nominations ==
Award	Year	Category	Film	Result
Kerala State Film Awards	2016	Best Character Actor	Kammatipaadam	Won
South Indian International Movie Awards	2017	Best Debutant Actor	Kammatipaadam	Nominated

== Filmography ==
Key
†	Denotes films that have not yet been released

- All films are in Malayalam language unless otherwise noted.

Year	Title	Role	Notes
2016	Kammatipaadam	Balan	
2017	Ezra		Cameo appearance
2017	The Great Father		Cameo appearance
2017	Ayal Jeevichirippundu		
2017	Alamara	Sugunan aka Supran	
2017	Basheerinte Premalekhanam		
2017	Varnyathil Aashanka	Gilbert Chambakkara	
2017	Chippy		
2018	Eeda	Upendran	
2018	Carbon	Stalin	
2018	Kayamkulam Kochunni	Vava	
2019	Petta	Gnanam's henchman	Tamil film
2019	Mamangam	Kungan	
2019	Ripper	Ripper Chandran	
2021	Anugraheethan Antony	Sudharmman	
2021	Anan	Joppan	
2021	Mukkon		
2021	Kuruthi	Preman	
2022	Maamanithan	Mani	Tamil film
2022	Solamante Theneechakal	Arumughan	
2022	Pathonpatham Noottandu	Bava	
2022	Cobra		Tamil film
2022	Eesho	Ambi Sura	
2022	Kakkipada		
2023	Thuramukham	Umboocha	
2023	Charles Enterprises	Saravanan	
2024	Malaikottai Vaaliban	Adima	
2024	Bramayugam	Koran	
2024	Thappinchuku Thiruguvadu Dhanyudu Sumathi		Telugu film
2024	Anchakkallakokkan	Kollan Shankaran / Shankarabharanam	
2024	Chithini		
2026	Bhishmar		
2026	Karakkam	Chackochan	
2026	Titans	Xavier	
2026	Disco †	TBA	
