= Ayyankali Pada hostage protest =

Adivasi rights protest

The Ayyankali Pada hostage protest was an Adivasi rights protest carried out by Maoist group Ayyankali Pada on October 4, 1996. Four members of the group, Vilayodi Sivankutty, Kanhangad Rameshan, Kallara Babu and Ajayan Mannur, took the then Palakkad district collector, WR Reddy, hostage at the District Collectorate in Palakkad, Kerala.

== Background ==
Ayyankali Pada was formed in 1992 as the youth wing of the new Kerala Communist Party after the dissolution of the Central Reorganisation Committee, Communist Party of India (CRCCPI). The group was named after revolutionary leader Ayyankali.

The activists acted partly in response to an amendment that had passed a week earlier on September 23, 1996 to the Kerala Scheduled Tribes (Restriction on Transfer of Lands and Restoration of Alienated Lands) Act, 1975. The 1975 Act required the state to return alienated lands to Adivasis; however, since 1975 no land had been returned under invocation of the act. The amendment had legalized transfers of Adivasi land between 1960-1984, essentially nullifying the original act.

== Protest ==
The activists held Reddy hostage for 9 hours, after which the negotiating parties reached an agreement of release and the activists revealed that their weapons were fake, although Reddy maintains that they were real. No serious injuries were reported during the protest.

On the day of the protest, the activists demanded the following:

- The immediate repeal of the amendment made to the Kerala Scheduled Tribes (Restriction on Transfer of Lands and Restoration of Alienated Lands) Act, 1975.
- The public release of data relating to land that has been stolen from Adivasis in Kerala.
- The public release of personal details of those individuals and companies that have encroached on Adivasi land.
- A detailed report of the usage of state funds allocated for the benefit of Scheduled Tribes.

The activists entered the District Collectorate on October 4 after having observed the area for several days beforehand. Armed with explosives and a gun, both later claimed to be fake, they entered Reddy's office and held him hostage. Throughout the day, a crowd gathered outside of the building. After 9 hours the hostage was released and the activists were promised safe passage by the government and not arrested.

== Aftermath ==
Despite the promises of the state, Sivankutty, Rameshan, and Mannur were arrested in later years. Kallara Babu remained in hiding for 14 years.

The Kerala Scheduled Tribes Act, 1975 was repealed three years later upon the passing of The Kerala Restriction on Transfer by and Restoration of Lands to Scheduled Tribes Act, 1999. While the 1999 Act declares all past and future land transfers between Adivasi and non-Adivasi parties illegal, it allows encroachers to keep up to five acres of previously stolen land. The 1999 Act grants only one acre of land to landless Adivasis, whereas the previous Act had granted five.

== In popular culture ==
The 2022 Malayalam-language film Pada is about the incident.
