= Jamna Pyari =

- Film poster
- Directed by: Thomas Sebastian
- Screenplay by: P. R Arun
- Produced by: Jaison Elamkulam
- Starring: Kunchacko Boban; Gayathri Suresh; Renji Panicker; Joy Mathew; Aju Varghese; Neeraj Madhav; Suraj Venjaramoodu
- Cinematography: Anishlal R S
- Edited by: V. Saajan
- Music by: Gopi Sunder
- Production company: R J Creations
- Distributed by: RJ Release
- Release date: 27 August 2015
- Running time: 126 minutes
- Country: India
- Language: Malayalam
- Budget: ₹4 crore (US$430,000)
- Box office: ₹7.4 crore (US$790,000)

Jamna Pyari is a 2015 Indian Malayalam-language comedy film directed by Thomas Sebastian. It stars Kunchacko Boban and Gayathri Suresh in the lead roles. Anishlal R. S. handles the cinematography. The music was composed by Gopi Sunder. The film was released on 27 August 2015 to a positive response from critics and became a success at the box office.Its Roja's 150 th film

== Plot ==
The story begins with Vasu, the father of Vasoottan, rescuing passengers of a bus which had fallen from a bridge into a flooded river. During the rescue, Vasu drowns in front of the onlookers including his friend Prakashan, his wife, and his child while trying to rescue a kid. Then the story moves over to Vasoottan, an auto-rickshaw driver, who is a helpful person possessing good qualities like his father. He helps anyone who is in need. Sabu is Vasoottan's friend and one-time goon who got reformed due to Vasoottan's influence. Vasoottan helps Sabu to marry Vinitha, his love interest.

One day, a girl named Parvathy hires his auto to go to the Wadakkanchery Railway Station. After a few days, Prakashan's son informs that a girl had come to their studio and had inquired about Vasoottan and also about the accident that took place a long time back in which Vasoottan lost his father. Vasoottan's friend, Sabu, speculates that it was Parvathy. Later, Vasoottan receives a call from Parvathy and asks him to come to her house to meet her father. Sabu and Prakashettan make a bet stating that Parvathy loves Vasoottan and had called him to fix their marriage. Vasoottan goes to her house and gets to know that they had called him to seek his help to deliver 100 Jamnapyari goats to a foreign firm. Parvathy's father who is a struggling businessman pleads with Vasoottan for his help, and he agrees to help them to deliver the Jamnapyari goats on time (within a period of 12 days). Sridharan, Parvathy's father's rival, tries different ways to get their business to fail with his money and muscle power. At first, Vasoottan arranges ten Jamna Pyaris from local, and he gets Tony Kurishinkal as new to his team. They give advertisements in print, audio as well as visual and e-media. They received wide responses for the ads and finally, manage to reach the target. After too many complications, Vasoottan succeeds in his target, and he and Parvathy get their love to succeed in the end.

== Cast ==
- Kunchacko Boban as Kuttan aka Vasoottan, a Thrissur based Auto rickshaw driver, son of Vasu
- Gayathri Suresh as Parvathy (Paaru)
- Suraj Venjaramoodu as Sabu
- Sijoy Varghese as Father of Vasoottan (Vasu)
- Aju Varghese as Ramehan (Raam)
- Renji Panicker as Sreedharan
- Neeraj Madhav as Tony Kurishinkal (Bro)
- Joy Mathew as Prakashan, a friend of Vasoottan's father Vasu
- Anumol as Veena
- Muthumani as Vinitha
- Roja Selvamani as the owner of Murugappa goat (Cameo appearance)
- Maniyanpilla Raju as Ajayan, Parvathy's father
- Thrissur Elsy
- Rajasree Nair as Vimala as Vasoottan's mother
- Arjun Nandhakumar as Goutham/Sridharan's son
- Santhosh Keezhattoor
- Shiju
- Dinesh Prabhakar
- Anju Aravind as Lakshmi, Parvathy's mother
- Gayathri Varsha
- Sonia Agarwal as cameo appearance
- Harikumar as cameo appearance
- Brijila Ragesh as a bus passenger
- Sarath Orippuram as a man in the title song.

== Box office ==
The film made at a budget of ₹4 crore (US$430,000) stood at third position among the five Onam release films at the box office. It grossed ₹6 crore (US$640,000) in 15 days of release. Asianet bagged the satellite rights. It collected ₹7.4 crore (US$790,000) from Kerala box office.

== Soundtrack ==
Jamna Pyari

Soundtrack album to Jamna Pyari by Gopi Sunder
- Released: 12 August 2015
- Genre: Feature film soundtrack
- Length: 11:22
- Language: Malayalam
- Label: Muzik 247
- Producer: Gopi Sunder

Gopi Sunder chronology
Ivide (2015)	Jamna Pyari (2015)	Urumbukal urangarilla (2015)

Muzik 247 released the songs of Jamna Pyari. The soundtrack was released during an audio launch held at Panampilly Nagar, Kochi. The film crew chose an Auto rickshaw parking stand as the venue. Actor Nivin Pauly was the special guest for the event who launched the audio by unveiling the CD in the presence of local auto-rickshaw drivers and the public.

The film has three songs which are composed by Gopi Sundar and penned by B. K Harinarayanan. These include "Vasoottan" sung by Franco Simon, "Jamnapyari" sung by Sachin Warrier and Maqbool, and "Murugappa" (also penned by Kalai Kumar) sung by Jassie Gift, Divya S. Menon, and Vijay Yesudas. The lyrics of the song "Vasoottan" were written in the Thrissur dialect.

Track	Title	Singer (s)	Length
1	"Vasoottan"	Franco	3.40
2	"Jamnapyari"	Sachin Warrier, Maqbool	3.32
3	"Murugappa"	Jassie Gift, Divya S. Menon, Vijay Yesudas	4.10
