= Sureshanteyum Sumalathayudeyum Hrudayahariyaya Pranayakadha =

- Theatrical release poster
- Directed by: Ratheesh Balakrishnan Poduval
- Written by: Ratheesh Balakrishnan Poduval
- Produced by: Emmanuel Joseph; Ajith Thalappilly
- Starring: Rajesh Madhavan; Chithra Nair
- Cinematography: Sabin Uralikandy
- Edited by: Akash Thomas
- Music by: Dawn Vincent
- Production companies: Silver Bay Studios; Silver Bromide Pictures
- Distributed by: Sree Gokulam Movies; Dream Big Films; Phars Films (Overseas); Yash Raj Films (UK/Europe)
- Release date: 16 May 2024
- Country: India
- Language: Malayalam

Sureshanteyum Sumalathayudeyum Hrudayahariyaya Pranayakadha (transl. The heart-touching love story of Sureshan and Sumalatha) is a 2024 Indian Malayalam-language romantic comedy film written and directed by Ratheesh Balakrishnan Poduval. It is a spin-off of the 2022 film Nna Thaan Case Kodu and features Rajesh Madhavan and Chithra Nair reprising their roles.

The film was released on 16 May 2024. The film was a box office disaster.

== Plot ==
Love story between Suresh and Sumalatha.

== Cast ==
- Rajesh Madhavan as Sureshan Kaavunthazhe
- Chithra Nair as Sumalatha
- Sudheesh as Sumalatha's father
- Jinu Joseph
- Sharanya Ramachandran
- Sharath Ravi
- Dhanesh Kolliyattu
- Babu Annur
- Unni Raja
- Vineeth Sreenivasan as Himself (Voice Role)
- Kunchacko Boban as Kozhummal Rajeevan (cameo appearance)

== Music ==
Hrudayahariyaya Pranayakadha

Soundtrack album by Dawn Vincent
- Genre: Feature film soundtrack
- Length: 4:32
- Label: Sony Music

No.	Title	Music	Singer(s)	Length
1.	"Premalola"	Dawn Vincent	Sushin Shyam	4:32

== Release ==
=== Theatrical ===
The first look poster of the film was released on 11 March 2024 and the official trailer of the film was released on 11 April 2024. The film was released on 16 May 2024.

=== Home Media ===
The digital streaming rights of the film were acquired by Saina Play, and will start streaming from 19 May 2026, two years after its theatrical release.

== Reception ==
The film mostly received mixed response from critics.
