= Jithin Raj (film director) =

Indian filmmaker (b. 1991)

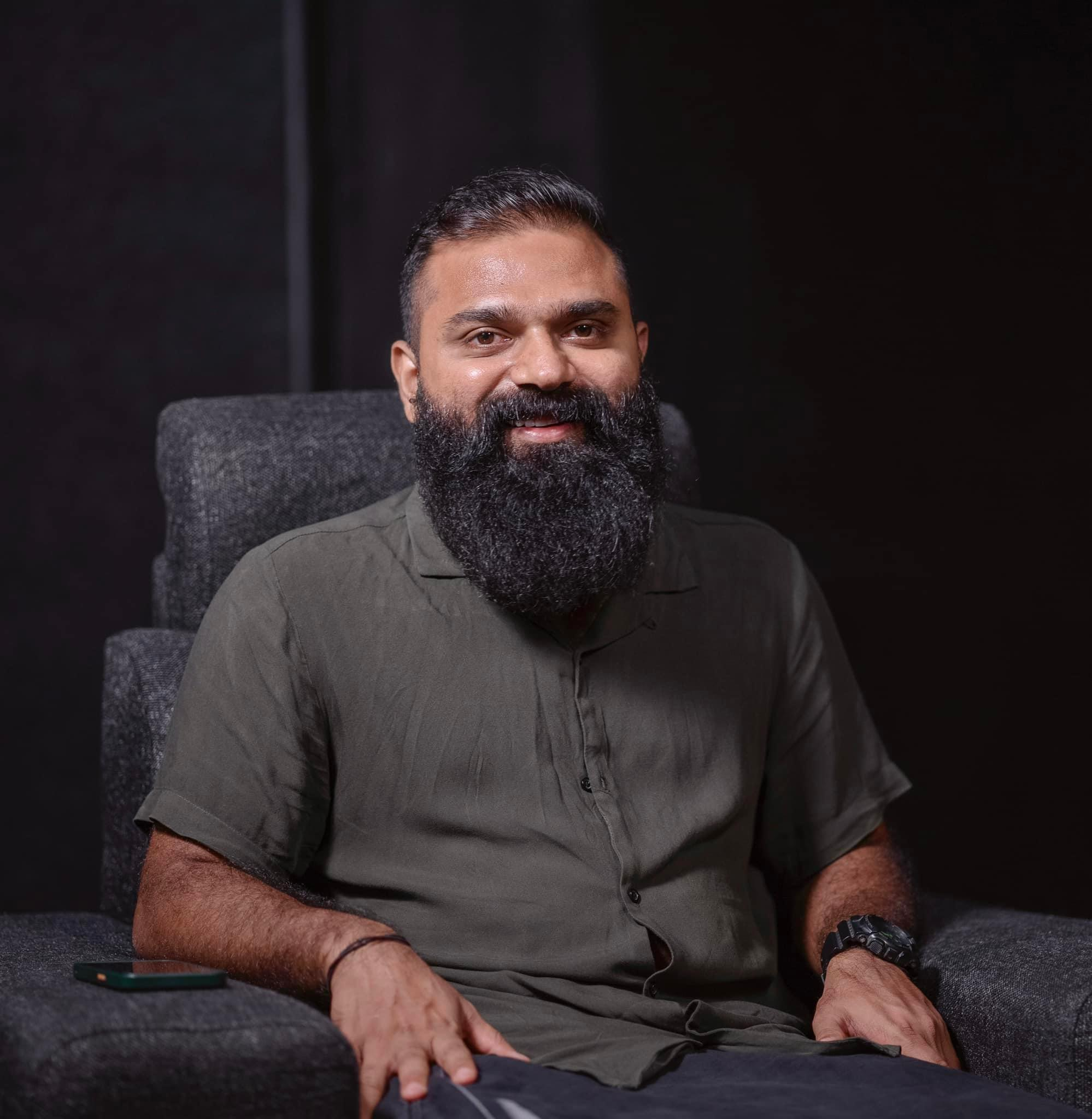
- Jithin Raj in 2023
- Born: 31 December 1991 (age 34); Konathukunnu, Thrissur, Kerala, India
- Occupation: Film director
- Years active: 2022–present

Jithin Raj (born 31 December 1991) is an Indian film director who predominantly works in Malayalam cinema. His Debut film Pallotty 90's kids went on to win the award for Best Children's Film at the 53rd Kerala State Film Awards.

== Personal life ==
Jithin Raj was born in Paingod Keli village, Thrissur district, Kerala on 31 December 1991 to Ambika Jayaraj and Jayaraj P S. His schooling was at Govt U P School, Konathukunnu, National Higher Secondary School, Irinjalakuda and Government Model Higher Secondary School Nadavaramba. Then he graduated from Sree Narayana Mangalam Institute of Management and Technology, Maliankara in Electronics and Communication Engineering.

== Career ==
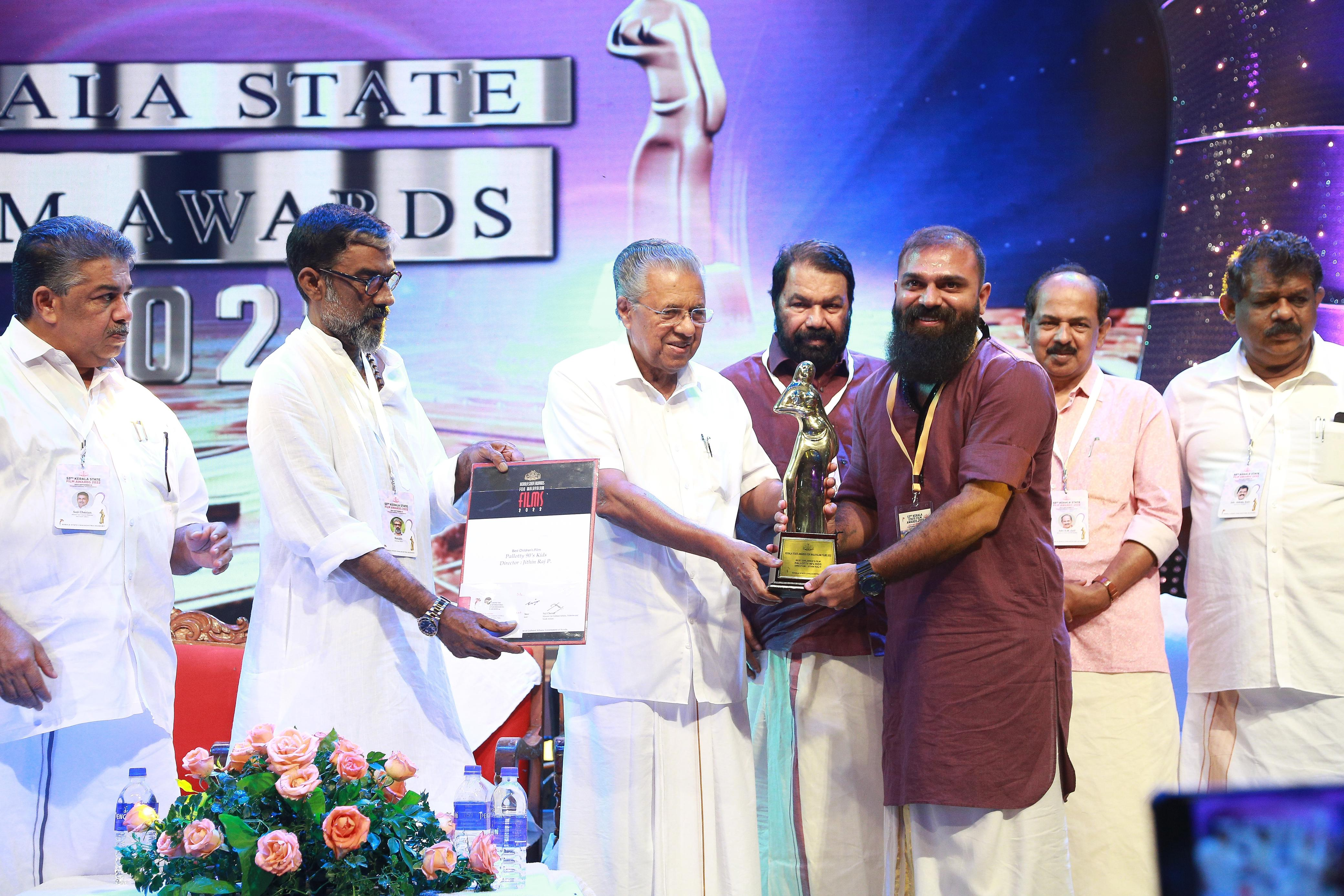
Jithin Raj receiving Kerala State Film Award for Best Children's Film at the 53rd Kerala State Film Awards

He started his career making short films of his own. The Malayalam film maker Anjali Menon praised him for his short film Pallotty, which has won over 20 awards across the state. He also directed two more short films before debuting as a feature film director.

In 2022, Jithin debuted as a feature film director with the movie Pallotty 90's Kids, based on his critically acclaimed short film Pallotty, which won the Kerala State Film Award for Best Children's Film at the 53rd Kerala State Film Awards. Pallotty 90's Kids bagged 3 awards overall at the 53rd Kerala State Film Awards.

== Filmography ==
=== As director ===
==== Feature films ====
Year	Title	Notes
2023	Pallotty 90's Kids	Won : Kerala State Film Award for Best Children's Film at 53rd Kerala State Film Awards

==== Short films ====
Year	Title	Notes
2017	Pallotty	Later expanded in to a Feature film
2018	Talking Toy	
2019	Virag	

== Awards ==
Year	Award	Venue	Film
2023	Kerala State Film Award for Best Children's Film	53rd Kerala State Film Awards	Pallotty 90's Kids
