= Kerala State Film Award for Best Children's Film =

Annual Indian film award

The Kerala State Film Award for Best Children's Film in Malayalam cinema is presented annually at the Kerala State Film Awards of India.

The recipients of the award over the years have been:

KERALA STATE FILM AWARD FOR BEST CHILDREN'S FILM
Year	Film	Director	Producer
1978	Ammuvinte Attinkutty	Ramu Kariat	
1979	Kummatty	G. Aravindan	K. Ravindranathan Nair
1982	Sahyante Makan	G. S. Panicker	Prabha
1983	NO AWARD		
1984	My Dear Kuttichathan	Jiju Punnoose	Appachan
1985	NO AWARD		
1986	NO AWARD		
1987	NO AWARD		
1988	Manu Uncle	Dennis Joseph	Joy Thomas
1989	NO AWARD		
1990	NO AWARD		
1991	Achan Pattalam	Nooranad Ramachandran	Bushrah Shahuddeen
1992	NO AWARD		
1993	Johnny	Sangeeth Sivan	Sanjeev Sivan
1994	NO AWARD		
1995	Mini	P. Chandrakumar	Madhu
1996	NO AWARD		
1997	Moksham	Beppur Mani	K. P. Venu
1998	NO AWARD		
1999	Kuttumanippookkal	M. N. Vinayakumar	Fathima Abdul Khader
2000	NO AWARD		
2001	Pularvettom	Harikumar	D.Chandrasenan Nair
2002	Krishnapakshakkilikal	Abraham Lincoln K. J.	Pradeep Paliyath
2003	NO AWARD		
2004	NO AWARD		
2005	NO AWARD		
2006	NO AWARD		
2007	Kaliyorukkam	S. Sunil	
2008	NO AWARD		
2009	Keshu	Sivan	Children's Film Society
2010	NO AWARD		
2011	Mazhavil Niraviloode	Rajesh Kumar R	Rajesh Kumar R
2012	NO AWARD		
2013	Philips and the Monkey Pen	Rojin Thomas, Shanil Muhammed	Sandra Thomas, Vijay Babu
2014	Ankuram	T. Deepesh	
2015	Malayattom	Thomas Devasia	
2016	Kolumittayi	Arun Viswam	Abhijith U A
2017	Swanam	T. Deepesh	
2018	Angu Doore Oru Deshathu	Joshy Mathew	
2019	Nani	Samvid Anand	Shaji Mathew
2020	Bonamy	Tony Sukumar	Sinseer
2021	Kaadakalam	Sakhil Raveendran	Periyar Valley Creations
2022	Pallotty 90's Kids	Jithin Raj	Sajid Yahiya
2023	NO AWARD		
2024	NO AWARD		
