= Chirakodinja Kinavukal =

Chirakodinja kinavukal
- Theatrical release poster
- Directed by: Santhosh Viswanath
- Written by: Praveen S Cheruthara
- Based on: Azhakiya Ravanan by Sreenivasan
- Produced by: Listin Stephen
- Starring: Sreenivasan; Kunchacko Boban; Rima Kallingal
- Narrated by: Lal Jose; Sreenivasan
- Cinematography: Vaidy S. Pillai
- Edited by: Mahesh Narayanan
- Music by: Deepak Dev
- Production company: Magic Frames
- Distributed by: Central Pictures; Popcorn Entertainments
- Release date: 30 April 2015 (India)
- Running time: 142 minutes
- Country: India
- Language: Malayalam

Chirakodinja Kinavukal (English: Dreams with Broken Wings) is a 2015 Malayalam spoof film. Directed by debutant Santhosh Viswanath, the film has been produced by Listin Stephen under the banner of Magic Frames. It has the notable achievement of being the first ever Malayalam parody film. The film features Kunchacko Boban in triple role, two lead roles and one cameo appearance alongside Sreenivasan and Rima Kallingal in the lead roles. Chirakodinja Kinavukal released on 1 May to generally mixed to positive reviews.

== Plot ==
Ambujakshan at long last gets to meet a director and a producer to narrate his story 'Chirakodinja Kinavukal', which he hopes would finally be made into a film. He declares that he has made a few changes to the script to meet the requirements of the new gen cinema, though the hero of his tale, Thayyalkkaran and his heroine Sumathi have not changed. As per Ambujakshan's story, Sumathi falls in love with a local tailor, Thayyalkkaran. Virakuvettukaran, her father, a rich woodcutter, is against this relationship and decides to marry her off to an NRI. Since it is seemingly futile to stop the marriage, the tailor tries to commit suicide and gets hospitalized. Surprisingly, the marriage comes to a halt. Therefore, in the end, Sumathi and the Tailor reunite.

== Cast ==
- Sreenivasan as N.P. Ambujakshan
- Kunchacko Boban in triple role as:
  - Thayyalkaran (Tailor)
    - Shebin Benson as Young Thayyalkaran
  - UK Karan (NRI)
  - Gulf Karan (NRI)
- Rima Kallingal as Sumathi
- Joy Mathew as Virakuvettukaran, Sumathi's father
- Srinda Ashab as Sumathi's friend
- Manoj K Jayan as Uthaman
- Jacob Gregory as Santhosh Balaji
- Idavela Babu as Thayyalkaran's friend
- Saiju Kurup as Commissioner K. P. Benny IPS
- Vijayakumar as Sub Inspector
- Mamukkoya as Broker
- Innocent as Mapranam Karayogam President T. P. V. Kurup (cameo)
- Lalu Alex as Thayyalkaran's father (cameo)
- Muktha (actress) in a Cameo Appearance

== Reception ==
Chirakodinja Kinavukal received mixed reaction from viewers and positive reviews from critics. Critics appreciated the style of film which portrayed the pre-existed and existing cliches in contemporary Malayalam cinema. Paresh C Palicha of Rediff.com states that Chirakodinja Kinavukal doesn't lampoon any superstars or directors, but it does make fun of cliche-ridden films. Deepa Soman of Times Of India praised the storyline of film and performances of actors.

== Soundtrack ==
The film's soundtrack contains 3 songs, all composed by Deepak Dev and Lyrics by B. K. Harinarayanan.

#	Title	Singer(s)
1	"Nilaakkudame Nilaakkudame"	P. Jayachandran, Minmini
2	"Kannil Nokkaathe"	Gayathri Suresh
3	"Omale Aaromale"	Manjari
