= Kala Viplavam Pranayam =

- First-look poster
- Directed by: Jithin Jithu
- Written by: Aashiq Akbar Ali
- Produced by: Roy Sebastian
- Starring: Anson Paul; Gayathri Suresh; Saiju Kurup; Niranjana Anoop; Vineeth Vishwam; Thanuja Kartik
- Cinematography: Anish Lal
- Edited by: Jith Joshie
- Music by: Athul Anand
- Production company: Dirham Film Productions
- Release date: 23 February 2018 (India)
- Country: India
- Language: Malayalam

Kala Viplavam Pranayam (English: Art Revolution Romance) is a 2018 Indian Malayalam-language drama film directed by debutant Jithin Jithu and produced by Roy Sebastian. The film stars Anson Paul and Gayathri Suresh in the lead roles.

== Cast ==
- Anson Paul as Jayan
- Gayathri Suresh as Greeshma
- Vineeth Vishwam as Nandhan
- Niranjana Anoop as Ayychumma /Ayisha Ahammed
- Saiju Kurup as Rameshan
- Rayhaan Roy as Aadhi
- P. Sreekumar as Raghavan
- Merin Jose as Vishnu
- Dharmajan Bolgatty as Ponthan Subhash
- Santhosh Keezhattoor as Comrade Ravi
- Thanuja Karthik as Sruthi Ravi
- Alencier Ley Lopez as Alikkal Ahammed Sahib
- Chembil Ashokan as Krishnan
- Ullas Pandalam as Kaduva
- Indrans as Achuthan
- Askar as Vijesh
- Ajay Nataraj as Suni
- Amboori Jayan as A.S.I Ramachandran

Parvathi T, Bijukuttan, Shobha Mohan, and Mahesh appear in cameo roles.

== Soundtrack ==
- Oru Dashakam ivideyithu...
- Medakkattu...
- Vanolam ...
- Idam valam ...
- Kannadi...
- Thirakal ...

== Production ==
The shoot for Kala Viplavam Pranayam commenced on 14 August 2017 in Thiruvananthapuram. The narrative of Kala Viplavam Pranayam is three-layered and revolves around art, romance and revolution. Reportedly, Anson Paul plays the protagonist in the movie and would be seen romancing Gayathri Suresh who plays a bold lecturer with communist leanings.

During the shoot days of Kala Viplavam Pranayam the writer Aashiq Akbar Ali had received enough and more phone calls only because of a picture which depicts a Muslim girl wearing a burqa on the location holding a party flag. However, the team did not let that affect the characterizations of the story.
