= Moksham =

1997 Indian film

- Directed by: Beypore Mani
- Written by: Beypore Mani
- Produced by: K. P. Venu
- Starring: Madhu; V. K. Sreeraman
- Cinematography: Beypore Mani
- Edited by: K. R. Bose
- Music by: Baiju Anchal
- Production company: Om Cine Creations
- Release date: 1997
- Country: India
- Language: Malayalam

Moksham (transl. Salvation) is a 1997 Indian Malayalam-language children's drama film written and directed by Beypore Mani. The film won the Kerala State Film Award for Best Children's Film in 1997.

== Cast ==
- Madhu
- Mamukoya
- V. K. Sreeraman
- Nithin
- Thodupuzha Vasanthi
- Thiruthiyadu Vilasini
- Dayana
- Simla
- Gracy
- Athira
- Suhas
- Sudhi

== Soundtrack ==
The music was composed by Baiju Anchal.

Track name	Singers	Lyrics
"Kani Thinnaan Vaa"	Lakshmi Rangan	K Jayakumar
