= Thappinchuku Thiruguvadu Dhanyudu Sumathi =

2024 Indian Telugu-language film by Narayana Chenna

- Theatrical release poster
- Directed by: Narayana Chenna
- Written by: Narayana Chenna
- Produced by: Bhikshamaiah Sangam; Ashok Reddy Pendela; Abinandan Ramanujam; Aranyan Ramanujam
- Starring: Priyadarshi Pulikonda; Shyam; Srinda; Manikandan R. Achari; Niranjana Anoop; Bhadram
- Cinematography: Jackson; K. P. Sathishkumar
- Edited by: Anthony
- Music by: Vivek–Abhishek
- Production companies: BS Production House; Yellow Thoughts Creations; AR Talkies
- Release date: 23 February 2024
- Running time: 91 minutes
- Country: India
- Language: Telugu

Thappinchuku Thiruguvadu Dhanyudu Sumathi is a 2024 Indian Telugu-language crime thriller film written and directed by Narayana Chenna. The film features Priyadarshi Pulikonda, Shyam, Srinda, Manikandan R. Achari, Niranjana Anoop and Bhadram in important roles.

The film was released on 23 November 2024.

== Cast ==
- Priyadarshi Pulikonda
- M. G. Shyam
- Srinda
- Manikandan R. Achari
- Niranjana Anoop
- Bhadram
- Suri Vamsi
- Ranjini George
- Benzi Mathews

== Release ==
Thappinchuku Thiruguvadu Dhanyudu Sumathi was released on 23 February 2024. Post-theatrical digital streaming rights were acquired by Aha and premiered on 28 November 2024.

== Reception ==
Kausalya Rachavelpula of The Hans India gave a rating of 1 out of 5 and stated that "Thappinchuku Tirugu Vadu Dhanyudu Sumathi misses the mark as a compelling thriller. Priyadarshi’s stellar performance is it's [sic] only redeeming quality, but its not enough to compensate for the lackluster storytelling and technical shortcomings". Vimalatha Reddy of BigTV too gave the same rating and is critical about the screenplay and pacing.
