= Konathukunnu =

Town in Thrissur district, Kerala, India

Coordinates: 10.6201°N 76.01031°E

Konathukunnu is a town in Thrissur district, Kerala, India.

The town has a panchayat office, a government school, hospitals, pharmacies, a masjid, a Shiva temple, petrol stations, several supermarkets, and bakeries. More than 100 bus services connect the town to all parts of Kerala. It is located between Irinjalakuda and Kodungallur on State Highway 22, 5 kilometres (3.1 mi) from S. N. Puram (NH 66).

- Pin Code :680123
- STD Code:0480

== Transportation ==
- Nearest airport: Kochi International Airport – 40 kilometres (25 mi)
- Nearest railway station: Irinjalakuda (Kallettumkara) – 15 kilometres (9.3 mi)
