= God for Sale =

God for Sale: Daivam vilpanakku
- Theatrical Release Poster
- Directed by: Babu Janardhanan
- Written by: Babu Janardhanan
- Produced by: Salim P. T.
- Starring: Kunchacko Boban; Jyothi Krishna; Suraj Venjaramoodu; Anumol; Tini Tom; Thilakan
- Cinematography: Sinu Sidharth
- Edited by: Sobin K Soman
- Music by: Afsal Yousuf
- Production company: Green Advertising
- Distributed by: Saldal
- Release date: 28 June 2013
- Country: India
- Language: Malayalam

God for Sale : Daivam vilpanakku is a 2013 Indian Malayalam-language drama film written and directed by Babu Janardhanan and starring Kunchacko Boban in the lead role with Jyothi Krishna, Suraj Venjaramoodu, Anumol, Tini Tom and Thilakan plays other pivotal roles. The film focusses on the fraudulent spiritual leaders and demigods who are rising in numbers and tackles it with a satirical tinge. This was the last movie in which Thilakan acted before his death.

== Plot ==
God for Sale is a satirical take on what determines the faith of a person. The film opens with the arrest of Poornananda Swami who is accused of child sacrifice. His story is unveiled through versions put forth by the accused and his brother Baskaran.

The plot of the movie shifts to the 70s. Attingal village is home to Kamalasanan Pillai, a tailor. One fine morning, after a Kadhaprasangam performance, Pillai was found dead under suspicious circumstances. From there, the plot shifts to a more contemporary period. Prasannan, son of Kamalasanan Pillai, is now a hardworking daily wages labourer, who has a lady love. Again, the backdrop changes, and the protagonist is seen as a brilliant law student in a famous college. Prasannan confronts some bitter truths in his early life that alters his personality. When he joins the college, he is attracted to Swayam seva Sangh (Right wing ideology). Later he falls in love with a rich woman, and eventually turns into an affluent person, and an emotional downfall turns him into an alcoholic. The journey of Prasannan from there to the retreat centre and ultimately to a person who claims to be the avatar of God is the storyline of the film.

== Cast ==
- Kunchacko Boban as Prasannan Nair/Poornananda Swami
- Jyothi Krishna as Kamala
- Suraj Venjaramoodu as Kamalahasanan Pillai and Baskaran
- Anumol as Anupama
- Kochu Preman
- Kalaranjini
- Mala Aravindan
- Tini Tom
- Thilakan
- Lakshmi Priya
- Krishna Prasad

== Production ==
The first schedule of the film was taken in mid-2012. Actor Thilakan appears in an important scene taken in this schedule. This was the last movie Thilakan acted in before his death. The major locales of the film were Government Engineering College, Thrissur and Vadakkencherry.
