= Nakshatratharattu =

- Promotional poster
- Directed by: M. Shankar
- Screenplay by: Shathrughnan
- Story by: A. Jaffer
- Produced by: Kannan Perumudiyoor; T. Haridas
- Starring: Kunchacko Boban; Shalini
- Cinematography: Vipin Mohan
- Edited by: P. C. Mohanan
- Music by: Mohan Sithara
- Production company: Harishree Films International
- Distributed by: Harisree Films Release
- Release date: 6 February 1998
- Running time: 137 minutes
- Country: India
- Language: Malayalam

Nakshatratharattu (transl. Lullaby of the stars) is a 1998 Indian Malayalam-language romance film directed by M. Shankar (in his directorial debut), starring Kunchacko Boban and Shalini in the lead roles. The film was a success at the box office.

== Plot ==
Sunil meets Hema while on a bus trip. They quarrel on the bus, to humorous results, but part upon reaching their destination. Sunil goes to meet Swaminathan, who organises a job for Sunil as a photographer. For his first job, his boss tells him to find a model. Sunil spots Hema at his office, and as she is a part-time model, he takes pictures of her, and they get to talking in the meantime. Sunil presents the photos to his boss and Hema is chosen as the model.

Hema and Sunil get into a fight the next day, but Sunil suggests that Hema likes him, after which he asks her out. While he is packing to leave, she arrives with a few of her friends. Swaminathan also arrives before them and hides in the house. The two fight again, and she leaves after giving him a shirt she'd bought for him. He throws the shirt into the pond out of anger, but fishes it out the next day and discovers that it has the phrase, "I love you" written on it. Intending now to marry Hema, Sunil goes to see the priest in place of his father, as he is an orphan. Hema, who is also an orphan, is unaware that the same is true for Sunil, and dreams of having a big family. The priest gives his blessing and they marry. Swaminathan organises a house for them in Skyline Colony and they meet Darling Hariharan. His mother despises the couple since they married without their parents' permission. However, when they finally meet and decide that either Sunil or Hema's parents will be the chief guest, everything falls apart. After they learn that they are both orphans, they go on a hunt to adopt a mother and father, and the rest of the story is formed by how they get along with their new parents.

== Cast ==
- Kunchako Boban as Sunil
- Shalini as Hema
- Thilakan as Sunil and Hema's adopted father
- Bharathi as Sunil and Hema's adopted mother
- Jagadeesh as M. K. Swaminathan
- Kumarakam Reghunath as Fernadus
- Krishna Prasad as Prakash
- Harisree Ashokan as Darling Hariharan
- Sai Kumar as Jayan
- Chandni Shaju as Thankamani
- Beena Antony as Jayan's wife
- Anil Murali as Xavier
- Praseetha Menon

== Soundtrack ==
Nakshatratharattu

Soundtrack album by Mohan Sithara
- Released: 1997
- Recorded: 1997
- Studios: Chetana, Thrissur
- Genre: Feature film soundtrack
- Length: 34:04
- Language: Malayalam
- Labels: Sonnet Audios; Satyam Audios

Mohan Sithara chronology
Istadaanam (1997)	Nakshatratharattu (1997)	Manthrikumaran (1998)

The soundtrack album of the film is composed by Mohan Sithara for the lyrics penned by Gireesh Puthenchery.

No.	Title	Singer(s)	Length
1.	"Ponveyil"	K. J. Yesudas	04:53
2.	"Poomaanam"	K. S. Chithra	04:34
3.	"Chellakkattu"	K. S. Chitra, M. G. Sreekumar, Srividya, C. O. Anto	05:05
4.	"Neeyente Paattil"	K. J. Yesudas, Sujatha Mohan	04:55
5.	"Chellakkattu"	M. G. Sreekumar, Srividya, C. O. Anto	05:05
6.	"Poomaanam"	K. J. Yesudas	04:34
7.	"Maaye Thaaye"	Ambili	03:58
Total length:			34:04

== Release ==
=== Reception ===
Jayalakshmi K. of Deccan Herald gave the film a verdict of "Good time-pass". Parvathy Nair of The New Indian Express wrote the film is "better than average".

=== Box office ===
The film was a box-office hit, and ran for more than 90 days. It also helped Kunchako Boban to position himself in Mollywood.
