= Ariyippu =

2022 film by Mahesh Narayanan

- Theatrical Release poster
- Directed by: Mahesh Narayanan
- Written by: Mahesh Narayanan
- Produced by: Shebin Backer; Kunchacko Boban; Mahesh Narayanan
- Starring: Kunchacko Boban; Divya Prabha; Danish Husain; Loveleen Mishra
- Cinematography: Sanu Varghese
- Edited by: Mahesh Narayanan; Rahul Radhakrishnan
- Music by: Sushin Shyam
- Production companies: Shebin Backer Productions; Kunchacko Boban Productions; Moving Narratives
- Release dates: 4 August 2022 (Locarno Film Festival); 16 December 2022 (Netflix)
- Running time: 107 minutes
- Country: India
- Language: Malayalam

Ariyippu (transl. Declaration) is a 2022 Indian Malayalam-language drama film written and directed by Mahesh Narayanan. The film is produced by Shebin Backer, under the banner of Shebin Backer Productions, Kunchacko Boban under the banner of Kunchacko Boban Productions and Mahesh Narayanan himself under the Moving Narratives banner. It features Kunchacko Boban, Divya Prabha, Danish Husain, Loveleen Mishra, and Faizal Malik in pivotal roles. The film premiered in the Concorso internazionale (international competition section) of the 75th Locarno Film Festival on 4 August 2022, where it was nominated for Golden Leopard. The film had a worldwide release on Netflix on 16 December 2022.

== Plot ==
Set in the pandemic-stricken times in Noida, a struggling Malayali couple nurture the dream of migrating out of the country for a better life. They both are working in a glove factory and they record a video of Reshmi working which they wanted to share with prospective employers as a skill video. Later, Hareesh receives a video on WhatsApp where he finds his wife's original video joined with a different clip of a woman engaging in a sexual act with a man. Hareesh decides to complain to the police to prove his wife's innocence. But the police discourages them, saying since the burden of proof will be on Reshmi, they should withdraw the complaint.

Hareesh decides to investigate who leaked the video. His only proof is a bangle typically worn by men which the guy in the video was wearing and that the background of the video is B Block in their company. He follows a driver in the glove factory and finds out that the driver is part of a gang who is replacing the new gloves with used up ones. Meanwhile, Hareesh sexually assaults Reshmi in the presence of their friend Sujaya and Sujaya's son.

Hareesh watches CCTV footage to collect the proof and he finds Reshmi entering B block where the sex act was committed. Hareesh thinks that it was his wife itself in the video. He confronts Reshmi at home, hits her and pushes her out of his home. Reshmi starts living with her friend.

Hareesh and others inform the owner of the company about the scam that is happening at his company. Together they investigate and tries to collect all evidences. Hareesh meanwhile sees the bangle on the owner's hand and he thinks its the owner who is in the video. Hareesh takes them to a remote place pretending to show them the used glove godown. There, Hareesh assaults the owner physically and is arrested. But the owner and Reshmi comes to the police station and owner gives his statement that Hareesh did not attack him and he does not have any complaints.

Hareesh later understands that the woman in the video is another worker in the company who committed suicide. She was having an affair with the owners brother and when they found out about it, she was killed or she committed suicide. The owner and his wife gives Hareesh and Reshmi an offer that both of them will get a job in the owner's another company in Malaysia if they withdraw the original complaint from police. Hareesh agrees but Reshmi does not. Reshmi says her demands are 1) to put a statement on the company noticeboard that it is not Reshmi in the video and 2) she has to visit the family of the victim who died.

Hareesh and Reshmi goes to the victim's home and Reshmi changes her mind when she sees the plight of the victim's mother. She said she is not ready for the compromise because the owner is giving them the price of the victim's life. Rashmi also says that Hareesh can take the offer if he wants but she will not take up that job. Later we see that Hareesh joins the new factory in Malaysia where he sees an employee there wearing the same bangle. Rashmi however continues to work in the same factory in Noida. We also see a notice on the noticeboard where the company denies that the girl in the video is an employee of the company which was one of Reshmi's demands.

== Cast ==
- Kunchacko Boban as Hareesh P. V.
- Divya Prabha as Reshmi Hareesh, Hareesh's wife
- Danish Husain as Kailash
- Loveleen Mishra as the female supervisor
- Athulya Ashadam as Sujaya
- Faisal Malik as Dinesh Singh
- Kannan Arunasalam as Suresh
- Kiran Peethambaran as Mohan
- Kartikey Saxena as Gudda
- Sidharth Bhardwaj
- Dimpy Mishra
- Rohit Gupta as Pawan
- Saifuddin as Ismail
- Mannu Rawat as NSEZ Security Guard
- Rahul Panicker as Doctor

== Production ==
Principal photography began on 20 December 2021. In January 2022, the film was shot in Noida. The film was wrapped up on 11 February 2022.

== Release ==
The film had its premiere at the 75th Locarno Film Festival on 4 August 2022, where it was nominated for Golden Leopard. The film released on 16 December 2022 via Netflix.

== Reception ==
Anna M. M. Vetticad reviewed it for Firstpost and praised the authenticity of the acting, cinematography and writing. She rated the film 4.5 out of 5 stars and wrote, "Ariyippu depicts women's oppression including physical abuse without ever seeking to titillate (...) Slice-of-life cinema has seldom been more true to life than this." Vetticad specifically highlighted the film's "acute observations of gender relations" and spotlight on female solidarity, commending the lack of judgement and honesty within the film's narrative in comparison to commercial films that deal with similar subject matter. She named it the best Malayalam film of 2022. Sajin Shrijith of The New Indian Express rated 4 out of 5 and appreciated the film stating, "In Ariyippu, we find Mahesh Narayanan at his most liberated, operating in a terrain he hasn't explored before." Shrijith further wrote, "Ariyippu is his purest film, devoid of adulteration from commercial cinema trappings". Praising the performance of Kunchacko Boban, Shrijith wrote, "This is Kunchacko Boban at his most unglamorous and uninhibited." Shrijith opined, "It's a film for grown-up, serious-minded filmgoers."

== Awards and nominations ==
Year	Event	Category and award	Recipient(s)	Result	Ref.
2022	Locarno Film Festival	International competition: Golden Leopard	Ariyippu	Nominated	
2023	53rd Kerala State Film Awards	Kerala State Film Award for Best Director	Mahesh Narayanan	Won	
2022	68th Filmfare Awards South	Filmfare Award for Best Critics film - Malayalam	Ariyippu	Won	
