= Dhanya (film) =

- Theatrical release poster
- Directed by: Fazil
- Screenplay by: Fazil
- Produced by: Boban Kunchacko
- Starring: Srividya; Mohanlal; Jagathy Sreekumar; Nedumudi Venu
- Cinematography: U. Rajagopal
- Edited by: T. R. Sekhar
- Music by: Jerry Amaldev
- Production company: Excel Productions
- Distributed by: Excel Productions
- Release date: 14 August 1981
- Country: India
- Language: Malayalam

Dhanya is a 1981 Indian Malayalam-language film written and directed by Fazil and produced by Boban Kunchacko. The film stars Srividya, Mohanlal, Jagathy Sreekumar, and Nedumudi Venu. The musical score was composed by Jerry Amaldev. It was the debut film of Kunchako Boban, who appears in a minor role as a child.

== Cast ==
- Srividya as Dhanya
- Sarath Babu
- Mohanlal
- Jagathy Sreekumar
- Nedumudi Venu
- Alummoodan
- Aranmula Ponnamma
- Kunchacko Boban as child
- Meena Menon
- Mohan Jose
- Rajesh Nandan
