= Pallotty 90's Kids =

Indian film

- Directed by: Jithin Raj
- Written by: Deepak Vasan
- Produced by: Sajid Yahiya
- Starring: Davinchi Santhosh; Neeraj Krishna; Balu Varghese; Arjun Ashokan
- Cinematography: Sharon Sreenivas
- Edited by: Rohit V.S. Variyath
- Music by: Manikandan Ayyappa
- Production company: CP Film Productions
- Release date: 25 October 2024
- Running time: 126 minutes
- Country: India
- Language: Malayalam

Pallotty 90's Kids is a 2024 Indian Malayalam children's film, which marks the directorial debut of Jithin Raj. The film is presented by Lijo Jose Pellissery and is produced by Sajid Yahiya. Davinchi Santhosh and Neeraj Krishna play the lead roles in the film which also features actors Arjun Ashokan, Balu Varghese, Saiju Kurup, Niranjana Anoop and Dinesh Prabhakar. Pallotty won the Kerala State Film awards for 2023 under Best Children's Film, Best Child Artist and Best Singer.

== Plot ==
Unni is shown buying a brand-new Harley Davidson bike and riding it to his hometown. From there, the movie switches to the flashback mode to Unni and his Friend Kannan’s childhood.

Unni and Kannan are neighbours, Kannan slightly elder to Unni. Both are close friends and are always together in their adventures. Kannan’s father committed suicide sometime back and his mother runs the household with great difficulty. The movie goes through the different anecdotes in their school life like Unni’s first love, Science festival at school, annual sports day and the time when Unni accidentally swallowed a bubble gum amongst the others. Kannan cuts open his new rubber slippers to make Unni a new toy for his birthday which greatly moves him emotionally. On a parallel track is Manjulan an NRI and his friend Biju, who are friends with the 2 kids. Biju marries the school’s new teacher while Manjulan has trouble re-connecting to his mother, since she hides about his father’s death from him, when he initially goes abroad on borrowed money due to their hardships. Manjulan finally realizes his mistake and makes up with his mother.

Back in the present towards the climax, a grown up Unni comes back to his village and gifts the new bike to his childhood friend Kannan, who lives a humble life in the village running a repair shop.

== Cast ==
- Balu Varghese as Kannan
  - Davinchi Santhosh as young Kannan
- Arjun Ashokan as Unni
  - Neeraj Krishna as young Unni
- Nirupama Rajeev as Rema
- Anulekshmi as Paathu
- Saiju Kurup as Manjulan
- Niranjana Anoop as Unnis Friend
- Dinesh Prabhakar as Dasan
- Sudhi Koppa as Biju
- Vineeth Thattil as Suresh
- Adish Praveen as Bubblegum Subhish
- Mariya Prince as Devi Teacher
- Ajeesha as Mother of Kannan
- Anuprabha as Mother of Unni
- Thanka Subramanian as Naaniyamma
- Uma as Manjulan's mother
- Abu valayamkulam as Unnis's father
- Faisal Ali as Johnson Mash
