= Vishudhan =

- Theatrical poster
- Directed by: Vysakh
- Written by: Vysakh
- Produced by: Anto Joseph
- Starring: Kunchacko Boban; Miya
- Cinematography: Shehnad Jalal
- Edited by: Mahesh Narayanan
- Music by: Gopi Sundar
- Production company: Anto Joseph Film Company
- Distributed by: Aan Mega Media
- Release date: 22 November 2013
- Running time: 132 minutes
- Country: India
- Language: Malayalam

Vishudhan is a 2013 Indian Malayalam-language crime drama film Written and Directed by Vysakh and starring Kunchacko Boban and Miya. The film tells the story of a Catholic Christian priest and a nun. It was released on 22 November 2013.

The film was shot at Thodupuzha and nearby locations.

== Plot ==
Sunny, a young priest, is put in charge of a church in a rural area. The church runs an old age home which is sponsored by Vavachan. Sunny meets Sister Sophie and discovers the motives behind Vavachan's philanthropy, he gets the unclaimed dead bodies for the medical college run by his son. Sunny meets Animol, the daughter of the church grave digger Jose, who aspires to follow in the footsteps of Mother Teresa. Sunny offers to get an admission in a nursing college in Bangalore. Animol witnesses an elderly woman smothered to death by Vavachan's son. She confesses to Sophie and Sunny, who advises her to reveal it to the police. But afraid for her life and her father, Animol, refuses and prepares to leave for Bangalore.

Sunny learns many members of the home are not Christians, but accommodated by Vavachan, so he can get their cadavers. Sunny decides to reveal everything to the Bishop. Vavachan begins a smear campaign against Sunny and Sophie that gets the sister thrown out of the church on the charge of having an affair with Sunny. Sunny leaves the priesthood to be her protector. They get married and eventually come back to prove that they have not done anything wrong. They face the ridicule of the village but Sunny's mentor Fr Pokkiriyachan comes to their rescue. He helps Sunny get a job at a resort playing in a band while Sophie becomes pregnant. One day, Sunny encounters Animol with a stranger and realises that she became a prostitute to get money. Confronting Animol, she explains that she had no other way.

One day, Animol is found dead and he was found hanging. Sunny decides to give the evidence to the Bishop, but is intercepted by the SI Rafeeq, who wants to question him on the deaths of Animol and Jose. Sophie says that Animol witnessed the murder committed by Vavachan's son and gives the copy of the evidence to the Rafeeq who reveals it to Vavachan. Pokkiriyachan gets Sunny out on bail, Sunny confesses all what he knows to Pokkiriyachan. After Animol's funeral, Jose confesses to Sunny that Animol was arrested in a raid and after realising that her father knew, she committed suicide and that's why her father did the same. After returning, Sunny finds Sophie shot dead in his house. In revenge, he hunts down Vavachan's son and kills him by stabbing him and brutally smashing his face. After revealing how he killed Sophie, Sunny kills Vavachan and realises that Vavachan's grandson has witnessed the murder. He prays and breaks down and Sunny embraces the boy and apologises to him.

== Cast ==
- Kunchacko Boban as Fr. Sunny (Sunnichan)
- Miya as Sister Sophie
- Lal as Fr. Mathew Pokkiriyachan
- Hareesh Peradi as Vavachan
- Suraj Venjaramoodu as Thomachan
- Shaalin Zoya as Animol
- Krishna Kumar as Cleetus, Vavachan's son
- Nandu as Kuzhimattam Jose, Animol's father
- Sreelatha Namboothiri as Mother Superior
- Eric Anil as Vavachan's grandson
- Shiju as Thommichan
- Vanitha Krishnachandran as Sunny's mother
- Sasi Kumar as Bishop
- Dinesh Panicker
- Vinod Kovoor
- Joju George as Resort owner
- Munshi Venu
- Cherthala Lalitha as Hostel sister
- Indulekha as Monichan's wife

== Soundtrack ==
The songs of the film are composed by Gopi Sunder with lyrics penned by Rafeeq Ahmed, Murugan Kattakada.

| No. | Title | Singers | Length |
|---|---|---|---|
| 1. | "Oru Mezhuthiriyude" | Shahabaz Aman, Mridula Warrier |
| 2. | "Eden Thottam" | Anwar Sadath |

== Reception ==
Ajin Krishna of Oneindia.in gave a rating of 3 out of 5 and said it is one of the best till date from Vyshakh. The Times of India also gave 3 out of 5 rating and commented that the film has an unpretentious, lasting effect that comes out of certain sequences crafted with genuine moments so familiar to mankind. Rajeevan Francis of Metro Matinee commented that Vishudhan is a feel good movie, peppered with moral questionings, romance and conflict, the movie makes for a relaxed viewing, that is pleasant and not too emotionally daunting. Indiaglitz.com said that Vishudhan has a bold theme and will appeal to more serious viewers than the supporters of masala flicks.
