= Ratheesh Balakrishnan Poduval =

Indian film director

- Born: Payyanur, Kannur, Kerala, India
- Occupations: Film director; Screenwriter
- Years active: 2019–present

Ratheesh Balakrishnan Poduval is an Indian film director, screenwriter in Malayalam cinema. He made his debut cinema with Android Kunjappan Version 5.25, released on 8 November 2019. His films include Kanakam Kaamini Kalaham, Nna Thaan Case Kodu, Madanolsavam. He won Best Screen play award in 53rd Kerala state film awards for the film Nna Thaan Case Kodu.

== Filmography ==
- All films are in Malayalam language

| Year | Title | Director | Writer | Actor | Notes |
|---|---|---|---|---|---|
| 2019 | Android Kunjappan Version 5.25 | Yes | Yes | Yes | Debut film |
| 2021 | Kanakam Kaamini Kalaham | Yes | Yes | Yes | Cameo Appearance |
| 2022 | Nna Thaan Case Kodu | Yes | Yes | Yes | Cameo Appearance, Won best screenplay award (53rd Kerala State Film Awards) |
| 2023 | Madanolsavam | No | Yes | Yes | |
| 2024 | Sureshanteyum Sumalathayudeyum Hrudayahariyaya Pranayakadha | Yes | Yes | Yes | Spin-off of Nna Thaan Case Kodu |
| 2026 | Oru Durooha Saahacharyathil | Yes | Yes | Yes | |

== Awards and nominations ==
| Award | Year | Category | Film | Result | Ref. |
|---|---|---|---|---|---|
| 50th Kerala State Film Awards | 2019 | Best Debut Director | Android Kunjappan Version 5.25 | Won | |
| 53rd Kerala State Film Awards | 2023 | Best Screenplay (Original) | Nna Thaan Case Kodu | Won | |
