= Varnyathil Aashanka =

- Theatrical release poster
- Directed by: Sidharth Bharathan
- Written by: Thrissur Gopalji
- Produced by: Ashiq Usman
- Starring: Kunchacko Boban; Suraj Venjaramoodu; Chemban Vinod Jose; Shine Tom Chacko; Manikandan R. Achari
- Cinematography: Jayesh Nair
- Edited by: Bhavan Sreekumar
- Music by: Prashant Pillai
- Production company: Ashiq Usman Productions
- Distributed by: Central Pictures
- Release date: 4 August 2017 (India)
- Running time: 136 minutes
- Country: India
- Language: Malayalam

Varnyathil Aashanka (transl. Confusion in description) is a 2017 Indian Malayalam-language heist comedy film directed by Sidharth Bharathan, written by Thrissur Gopalji and produced by Ashiq Usman. It stars Kunchacko Boban, Suraj Venjaramoodu, Chemban Vinod Jose, Shine Tom Chacko, Manikandan R. Achari and Rachana Narayanankutty. The film was released on 4 August 2017 across Kerala and received positive from critics.

== Plot ==
The film tells the story of four thieves: Gowtta Shiva, Para Wilson, Pratheesh, Gilbert Chembakkara and a common man Dayanandan. They are settled and work in Thrissur. The four thieves plans a robbery attempt at a jewellery on a local strike day. Dayanandan gets into the team unexpectedly. What happens next forms the crux of the story. The characters of Sankaradi - the leftist ideologue Kuamara Pillai, Bobby Kottarakkara - RDP worker Uthaman, Innocent - Yashwant Sahai, leader of INSP from the Malayalam film Sandesham as well as Mala Aravindan's character Mullani Pappan from the Malayalam film Meesa Madhavan are shown as photographs.

== Cast ==
Cast	Role
Kunchacko Boban	Gowtta Shiva
Suraj Venjaramoodu	Dayanandan
Chemban Vinod Jose	Para Wilson
Shine Tom Chacko	Pratheesh
Manikandan R. Achari	Gilbert Chembakkara
Rachana Narayanankutty	Keerthana
Tini Tom	Constable Manikandan
Assim Jamal	Sub Inspector Binoy Mathew
Sunil Sukhada	Ittoop
Jayaraj Warrier	Rangan
Kichu Tellus	Parthan
Devi Ajith	
K.P.A.C. Lalitha	MLA Vijayalakshmi Teacher (cameo appearance)
Gayathri Suresh	Thanima
Dinesh Prabhakar	Constable Velayudhan
Ilhan	Abhimanyu
Roshna Ann Roy	Manju
Sankaradi	Kumara Pillai (photo only) reprisal from Sandesham
Bobby Kottarakkara	Uthaman (photo only) reprisal from Sandesham
Innocent	Yashwant Sahai (photo only) reprisal from Sandesham
Mala Aravindan	Mullani Pappan (photo only) reprisal from Meesa Madhavan

== Production ==
Initially it was reported that Asif Ali was in the cast in lead role. Later, he was replaced by Kunchacko Boban.

== Reception ==
sify rated 3 out of 5 stars and praised Kunchacko Boban and Suraj Venjarammoodu's performances and stated "Varnyathil Aashanka may be far from perfect, but it's a genuine effort for sure". Indiaglitz rated 3 out of 5 stars and said "Varnyathil Aashanka is a well crafted and entertaining watch". Manorama Online rated 3 out of 5 stars and stated "Varnyathil Aashanka isn't a boisterous comedy that provides you a thorough laughter riot, but it lends you some occasions to cheer silently and heartily". Lensmen Reviews rated 3.5 out of 5 stars and said " Varnyathil Aashanka is one movie you should definitely try. It may not be an out of the box theme or exceptional execution, but the 136 minutes of this movie is never boring and the screenplay completely invests in focusing on its final target".The Times of India rated 3 out of 5 stars and said "Varnyathilaashanka is worth your time for Suraj's performance, a handful of situational comedies and the smart 'utpreksha' delightfully weaved into it". Filmibeat rated 3 out of 5 stars and stated "Varnyathil Aashanka is yet another film in the league of good entertainers, without any unwanted gimmicks. As mentioned above, the film has a humorous tone throughout and undoubtedly, is one of the decent satires of recent times".

Baradwaj Rangan of Film Companion South wrote "Varnayathil Ashanka, then, is less about plot than about these characters, and events that are equally interconnected...this message is slyly delivered on a stage, and it's the latest instance in Malayalam cinema of a scene you don't see coming, and yet feels totally right. Even the film's “looseness,” by the end, feels right, for this is really a shaggy-dog story. The pointlessness is the point."
