= Kanakam Kaamini Kalaham =

- Official release poster
- Directed by: Ratheesh Balakrishnan Poduval
- Written by: Ratheesh Balakrishnan Poduval
- Produced by: Nivin Pauly
- Starring: Nivin Pauly; Grace Antony; Vinay Forrt
- Cinematography: Vinod Illampally
- Edited by: Manoj Kannoth
- Music by: Yakzan Gary Periera; Neha Nair
- Production company: Pauly Jr. Pictures
- Distributed by: Disney+ Hotstar
- Release date: 12 November 2021 (India)
- Running time: 121 minutes
- Country: India
- Language: Malayalam

Kanakam Kaamini Kalaham (transl. Gold, Lover, Quarrel) is a 2021 Indian Malayalam-language satirical film written and directed by Ratheesh Balakrishnan Poduval. The film stars Nivin Pauly and Grace Antony in lead roles, and Vinay Forrt, Vincy Aloshious, Sudheesh, Jaffar Idukki, Joy Mathew, Sivadas Kannur and Rajesh Madhavan in supporting roles. The film was produced by Nivin Pauly under the banner of Pauly Jr. Pictures. It was released through Disney+ Hotstar on 12 November 2021, ahead of Diwali.

== Plot ==
Former television actress Haripriya complains of being stuck in an unromantic marriage with junior artist and acting coach, Pavithran. Persuaded to save his marriage, Pavithran is forced to resort to a plan B, after his first attempt to satiate Haripriya with a gift of gold plated earrings that looks like it might get him into, rather than, out of trouble. Things take a turn for the worse when Haripriya's brother, seeks financial help and convinces her to mortgage her earrings. Upon learning this, an anxious Pavithran plans a sudden 3-day trip to Munnar, where he manages to hide the earrings in a hotel. The planned episode turns upside-down, when he is unable to find the earrings he had concealed, just hours ago. On the other side, his adamant wife suspects every other staff member of the hotel, citing reasons for the same. The rest of the film deals with the finding of the earrings, in a comical manner.

== Cast ==
- Nivin Pauly as Pavithran, an aspiring actor
- Grace Antony as Haripriya, Pavithran's wife and a former soap artist
- Vinay Forrt as Joby George, the hotel manager
- Vincy Aloshious as Shalini, the receptionist
- Joy Mathew as Balachandran, novelist
- Sudheesh as Sivakumar, a common friend to Priya and Pavithran
- Jaffar Idukki as Surendran (Sura), a drunkard who tries to support Pavithran during the argument
- Rajesh Madhavan as Manaf Khan, hotel boy
- Sudheer Paravoor as Vijesh Nair, supervisor
- Sivadas Kannur as Chandrachoodan, a marriage counselor
- Neeraja Rajendran as Pavithran's mother
- Ratheesh Balakrisna Poduvall as the film director (cameo appearance)

== Production ==
The film marks the second directorial of director, Rateesh Balakrishna Poduval after Android Kunjappan Version 5.25 (2019). The director announced the film on 13 October 2020. After the puja ceremony, principal photography of the film began in the first week of November 2020. Filming took place during the COVID-19 pandemic and hence proceeded by taking all necessary precautions. Ernakulam and Idukki were the major shooting locations. After about 40 days, filming wrapped on 15 December 2020. The dubbing and other post-production works were carried out in January and February, 2021.

Vinod Illampally is the cinematographer. The music of the film is composed by Yakzen Gary Periera and Neha Nair. The film was edited by Manoj Kannoth and Aneesh Nadodi is the art director. Shabu Pullappally handled the makeup and Kalat Revolution arranged the costumes.

== Marketing ==
In October 2020, Nivin Pauly announced this project through his social media handles along with a title poster. On 16 July 2021, the teaser of the film was released through Pauly Jr. Pictures YouTube channel. The trailer of the film was released on 22 October 2021.

== Release ==
Kanakam Kaamini Kalaham was released through Disney+ Hotstar on 12 November 2021. It is the first Malayalam film to be premiered through the platform's Disney+ Hotstar Multiplex initiative. It is also available on Hulu.

== Reception ==
The film received mixed reviews from critics. The Times Of India gave a rating 3 of 5 and wrote that, "On the whole, Kanakam Kamini Kalaham can be seen together with the family as a pleasant entertainer that provides some good insights into marriage." Pinkvilla rated the film with 3 out of 5 and wrote that, "Kanakam Kaamini Kalaham is a mind blowing fun adventure designed for the genuine laughs. This is a film designed to serve a harmless laugh amidst all the troubling news surrounding us and we can only sit back and wait for any deeper implications to the crazy, timely fun that the film offers." Sify gave a rating of 3.5 on 5 and wrote that, "Kanakam Kaamini Kalaham is dramatic, colourful and perhaps melody at times. Nivin Pauly gets into the shoes of his character superbly. Grace Antony is in fine form and comes up with a good show. The rest of the cast, including Vinay Forrt, Rajesh Madhavan, Sudheesh, Vincy Alocious and Jaffar Idukki are good." The Indian Express rated 3 on 5 for the filmand commented that, "This Nivin Pauly starrer is one of those films that will keep you smiling from start to end and Nivin Pauly deserves a special mention for embracing his role with much gusto and conviction." Onmaorama said that, "Kanakam Kaamini Kalaham, written and directed by Ratheesh Balakrishnan Poduval hinges on a simple, light-hearted theme, intended to trigger laughter and laughter alone."
