= Rajesh Madhavan =

Indian film actor, Director

- Born: 3 November 1986 (age 39); Kasaragod, Kerala, India
- Occupations: Actor; assistant director; casting director
- Years active: 2016–present
- Spouse: Deepthi Karat (2024-present)

Rajesh Madhavan (born 3 November 1986) is an Indian actor and director who works in Malayalam cinema.

== Career ==
Rajesh made his acting debut in 2016 with a supporting role in Maheshinte Prathikaaram. He started his career as an assistant director in the industry with Thondimuthalum Driksakshiyum (2017). He is recognized for his works as actor and creative director for the film Thinkalazhcha Nishchayam and his role as Manaf in Kanakam Kaamini Kalaham in 2021.

== Personal life ==
In December 2024, he married Deepthi Karat.

== Filmography ==
Key
| † | Denotes films that have not yet been released |

=== Director ===
| Year | Title | Notes |
|---|---|---|
| 2026 | Pennum Porattum | |

=== Assistant director ===
| Year | Title | Notes |
|---|---|---|
| 2017 | Thondimuthalum Driksakshiyum | |
| 2019 | Kumbalangi Nights | |

=== Actor ===
| Year | Title | Role | Notes |
|---|---|---|---|
| 2016 | Maheshinte Prathikaaram | Cycle boy | |
| 2017 | Mayanadi | Member of film crew | |
| 2017 | Thrissivaperoor Kliptham | | |
| 2018 | Street Lights | Sales boy in shop | |
| 2019 | Android Kunjappan Version 5.25 | Vinu | |
| 2020 | Trance | | |
| 2021 | Kanakam Kaamini Kalaham | Manaf Khan | |
| 2021 | Thinkalazhcha Nishchayam | Mani | |
| 2021 | Minnal Murali | P.C. Shinoj | |
| 2022 | Hawk’s Muffin | Alien person | |
| 2022 | Archana 31 Not Out | Broker | |
| 2022 | Naaradan | Cameraman Manu | |
| 2022 | Nna Thaan Case Kodu | Sureshan Kaavaunthazhe | |
| 2022 | 1744 White Alto | | |
| 2023 | Christy | Shelly | |
| 2023 | Kallanum Bhagavathiyum | Vallabhan | |
| 2023 | Madanolsavam | Shankaran Namboodiri | |
| 2023 | Neelavelicham | Kuthiravattam Pappu | |
| 2023 | Journey of Love 18+ | Adv Satish | |
| 2024 | Sureshanteyum Sumalathayudeyum Hrudayahariyaya Pranayakadha | Sureshan Kaavunthazhe | |
| 2024 | Grrr | Anas | |
| 2024 | Her | Anil | |
| 2025 | Maranamass | Sreekumar | |
| 2025 | Ronth | CPO's husband | |
| 2025 | Dheeran | Eldhose | |
| 2026 | Kaakee Circus | | Tamil debut; Web series |
| 2026 | Mollywood Times | Anand Sudhakaran | |
| 2026 | Jailer 2 | A singer | Tamil film; Cameo appearance in the song "Ala Bolelo" |
| 2026 | Prempaatta † | VKP | |

=== Casting director ===
- Nna Thaan Case Kodu
