= Gayathri Suresh =

Indian actress and model

- Born: Thrissur, Kerala
- Occupations: Actress; Model; Singer; Dancer; Anchor
- Years active: 2014–present

Gayathri Suresh is an Indian actress. She made her acting Debut through Jamna Pyari (2015).

== Filmography ==
- All films are in Malayalam, unless otherwise noted.

Year	Title	Role	Notes	Ref.
2015	Jamna Pyari	Parvathy		
2016	Karinkunnam 6'S	Daughter	Cameo Appearance	
2016	Ore Mugham	Gayatri		
2017	Oru Mexican Aparatha	Anu		
2017	Sakhavu	Aishwarya		
2017	Varnyathil Aashanka	Thanima		
2018	Kala Viplavam Pranayam	Greeshma		
2018	Naam	Anna Philip		
2019	Children's Park	Viji		
2019	Hero Heroine		Telugu film	
2021	99 Crime Diary	Aparna IPS	Direct OTT	
2021	Nenu Leni Naa Prema Katha	Radha	Telugu film	
2022	Mahi	Hitha Das		
2022	Escape	Daya		
2022	Uthami	Uthami		
2022	Gandharwa		Telugu film	
2024	Badal			
2024	Abhirami			
2024	Thayyal Machine			
2026	Maduramee Jeevitham	TBA		
2026	Disco †	TBA		

== Television ==
- All TV shows are in Malayalam language.

Year	Title	Role	Ref.
2022	Flowers Oru Kodi	Participant	
2017	Asianet Film Awards	Host	
2016	Asianet Film Awards	Curtain raiser Host	
2026	Bigg Boss 8	Contestant	

== Short films ==
Year	Film	Role	Language	Notes	Ref.
2017	Oru Acquarium Love Story	Gayathri	Malayalam		
	Shubayatra		Malayalam		
2018	Samakalikam		Malayalam		

== Honors ==
She won the Femina Miss Kerala beauty pageant in 2014.
