= Pada (film) =

2022 film by Kamal K.M

- Official Theatrical Poster
- Directed by: Kamal K. M.
- Written by: Kamal K. M.
- Produced by: Mukesh R. Mehta; A. V. Anoop; C. V. Sarathi
- Starring: Kunchacko Boban; Joju George; Vinayakan; Dileesh Pothan
- Cinematography: Sameer Thahir
- Edited by: Shan Mohammed
- Music by: Vishnu Vijay
- Production companies: E4 Entertainment; AVA Productions
- Release date: 10 March 2022
- Running time: 123 minutes
- Country: India
- Language: Malayalam

Pada (transl. Army) is a 2022 Indian Malayalam-language political thriller film directed by Kamal K. M. starring Kunchacko Boban, Joju George, Vinayakan, and Dileesh Pothan. The film is based on a true incident that occurred in 1996 when the then Palakkad collector was held hostage. The film was released on 11 March 2022 and opened to widespread critical acclaim.

== Premise ==
The film is based on a true incident that occurred in 1996 when the then Palakkad collector was held hostage. Pada begins with showing how five men in different places planning for something big to be done by them which might trigger a revolution. The group arrives at their destination, and waits for the collector to come. After a day's wait, they get into collector's chamber and forcibly ties him by chasing others around him out. On the collector's insistence to reveal, they identify themselves as 'Ayyankali Pada', activists working for the welfare of tribals and their current resolve is to keep the collector as a hostage and bargain with the current government to repeal the controversial Adivasi Land Amendment Bill. The miserable plight of Adivasi community is drawn more literally on the screen through the exchanges between the collector and the five men, the former however sympathizes with their plight and align with their cause.

== Cast ==
- Kunchacko Boban as Rakesh Kangangad (Based on Ramesh Kanhangad)
- Joju George as Aravindan Mannur (Based on Ajayan Mannur)
- Vinayakan as Balu Kallaar (Based on Babu Kallara)
- Dileesh Pothan as Narayanakutty (Based on Vilayodi Shivankutty)
- Arjun Radhakrishnan as IAS Ajay Sripad Dange (Based on W. R. Reddy)
- Shine Tom Chacko as Sadik Hasanar
- Prakash Raj as Chief Secretary N. Rajasekharan IAS
- Indrans as Kannan Mundoor (Based on Mundar Ravunni)
- Jagadish as P. Krishna Kumar IAS
- Unnimaya Prasad as Mini K. S.
- Salim Kumar as Justice Thankappan Achari
- Sudheer Karamana as Francis Chacko IPS
- Santhosh Keezhattoor as N. P. Ravichandran IAS
- V. K. Sreeraman as Chief Minister E. K. Nayanar
- T. G. Ravi as Advocate Jayapalan
- Bitto Davis as DySP K. P. Thomas
- Sajitha Madathil as Padmini Ramachandran
- Savithri Sreedharan as Kunji
- Kani Kusruti as Sheeja P. K.
- James Eliya as IG K. Chandran IPS
- Sibi Thomas as CI Roy Joseph
- Kottayam Ramesh as DGP
- Vivek Vijayakumaran as Sachin Aggarwal IPS
- Shankar Ramakrishnan as Cyriac Abraham IAS
- Gopalan Adat as Usman
- Rajesh K as Jayakrishnan
- Dasan Kongad as Kumaran
- Gopan Mangat K. Ravi
- Raavi Kishor as Malini, Dange's wife
- Davinchi Santhosh as Aasad, Balu's son
- Ishitha Sudheesh as Rosa, Balu's daughter

== Soundtrack ==
Pada

Soundtrack album by Vishnu Vijay
- Released: 28 March 2022
- Recorded: 2020–2022
- Genre: Feature film soundtrack
- Length: 42:31
- Label: E4 Entertainment
- Producer: Vishnu Vijay

Vishnu Vijay chronology
Bheemante Vazhi (2021)	Pada (2022)	Makal (2022)
External audio
- Original Soundtrack on YouTube

The original soundtrack is composed by Vishnu Vijay.

Pada (Original Motion Picture Soundtrack)
No.	Title	Length
1.	"Bus Scene"	01:32
2.	"Intro"	01:14
3.	"Planning"	01:09
4.	"Vinayakan Intro"	01:01
5.	"Bomb Making"	01:12
6.	"Chackochan"	01:21
7.	"Collector Gun Point"	02:03
8.	"Collector Intro"	01:01
9.	"Interval"	01:16
10.	"Collector At Gunpoint When Door Opens Scene"	01:59
11.	"Crowd & Indrans Scene"	01:31
12.	"Dileesh Pothen Talks To Collector Being Tied Scene"	01:11
13.	"Drinking Water & Eating Banana Scene"	01:15
14.	"Higher Officials & Prakash Raj Meeting Scene"	03:10
15.	"Indrans & Police Group Scene"	01:10
16.	"Prakash Raj Office Scene"	01:42
17.	"All Sitting Idle Scene"	01:32
18.	"Crowd & Police Tries To Break In Scene"	01:06
19.	"Police Planning With Map Scene"	01:02
20.	"Prakash Raj Talking To Adv On Phone Scene"	02:00
21.	"Adv Going Upstairs"	01:49
22.	"Adv Sits For Discussion Scene"	03:10
23.	"Collector Coming Out Scene"	01:56
24.	"Travel With Adv In Car Scene"	05:58
Total length:		42:31

== Production ==
The film began production in 2019 with Kunchacko Boban, Joju George, Vinayakan and Dileesh Pothan. Mammootty was reported to make a cameo. Shooting finished by August 2019.

== Reception ==
The film released to highly positive reviews.

Anna M. M. Vetticad of Firstpost rated the film 4 out of 5 stars and wrote, "Pada is a lesson for students of cinema on how to keep a true story engaging even for a person who has read the facts, including the sensational climax, available to the public." She added, "...Pada steers clear of cinematic loudness. In this, it is far removed from formulaic, machoistic commercial Indian cinema of all languages, which substitutes hollow, violent machismo for valour." but said there was a "frustrating deficiency" of gender diversity in the film. Vetticad ranked it eighth on her year-end list of best Malayalam films for the publication. Anna Mathews of A critic from The Times of India gave the film a rating of four out of five and said that "Basically, writer-director Kamal KM used a striking incident in the State's political history and converted it into a good cinema with a compelling, thought-provoking screenplay, perfectly captured scenes that convey not only the very different times but also the working of our government offices, and great acting. This is a highly recommended film for all". S. R. Praveen of The Hindu called the film "a sympathetic portrayal of the justified anger of the oppressed". Gautham VS of The Indian Express opined that "The movie is a powerful political statement and throws light on the policies of changing governments, be it the left or the right, who diluted the tribal laws over the years in favour of corporate interests by taking away the rights of tribal communities over forests".
