= Kunchacko Boban =

Indian actor and film producer

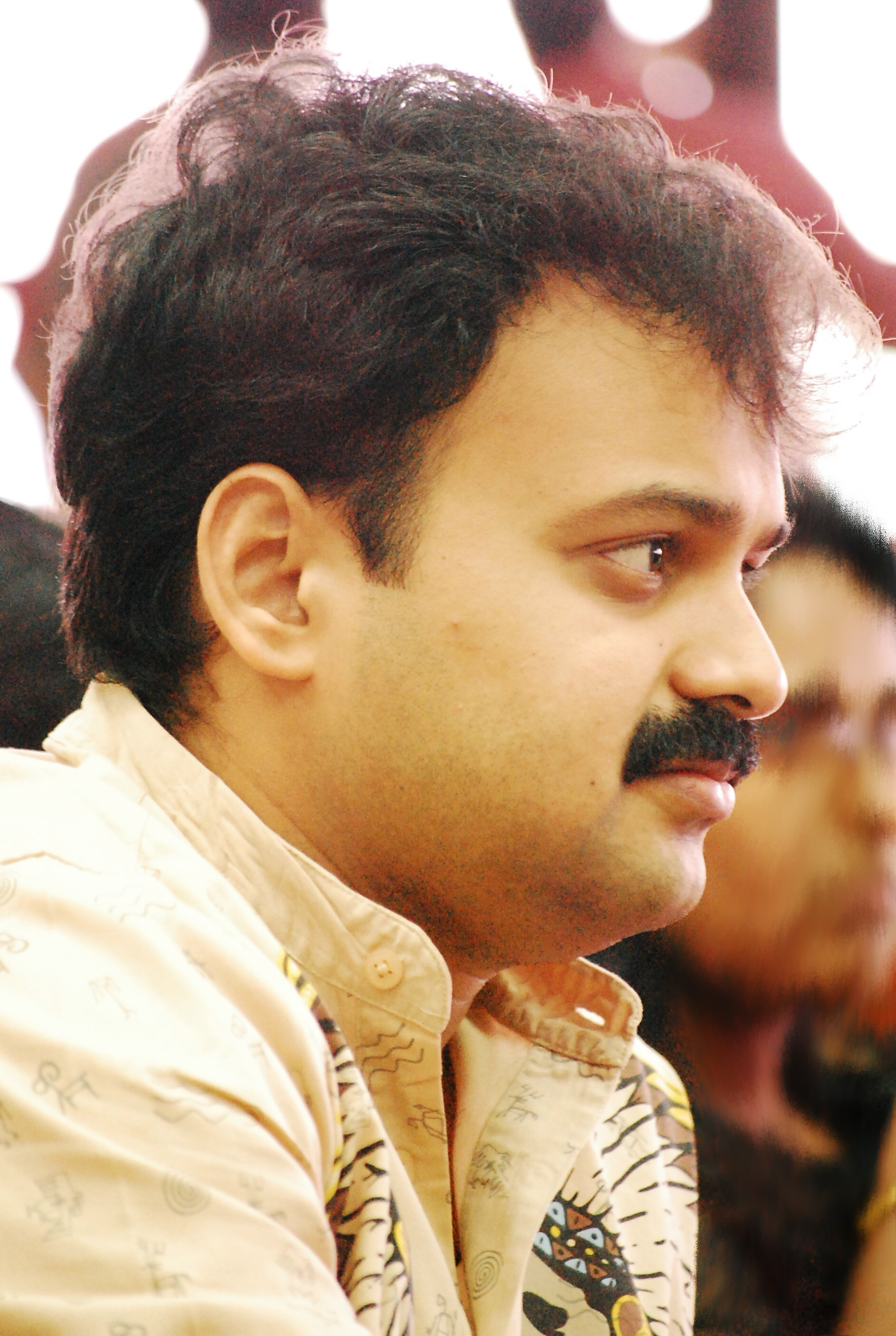
- Kunchacko Boban in 2008
- Born: 2 November 1976 (age 49); Alappuzha, Kerala, India
- Other names: Chackochan; Ku Bo; Kunchacks
- Education: St. Berchmans College, Changanassery; Sanatana Dharma College, Alappuzha (B. Com.)
- Occupations: Actor; producer; businessman
- Years active: 1981 (child artist); 1997–present
- Works: Full list
- Spouse: Priya Ann Samuel (m. 2005)
- Children: 1
- Father: Boban Kunchacko
- Relatives: Kunchacko (grandfather); Jijo Punnoose (uncle); Navodaya Appachan (granduncle)
- Family: See Kunchacko family

Kunchacko Boban (born 2 November 1976) is an Indian actor and film producer who works in the Malayalam film industry. He is referred to as Chackochan, and during the early 2000s, he was called "chocolate boy" because of his romantic image. He has acted in more than 100 films in more than two decades. He is a member of the Kunchacko family.

Kunchacko's debut was as a child in the film Dhanya (1981) produced by his father Boban Kunchacko. He debuted as an adult leading role in Fazil's 1997 romantic drama Aniyathipraavu opposite Shalini, which became the highest-grossing Malayalam film till that point, establishing him as a bankable actor overnight. He appeared in a brief role in Harikrishnans (1998) starring Mohanlal and Mammootty, which was the top Malayalam box office grosser of the year. Kunchacko and Shalini joined again in the successful romantic films Nakshatratharattu (1998), Niram (1999) and Prem Poojari (1999). Niram emerged as one of the highest-grossing films of the year, spawning several remakes. By then he had created a "romantic hero" image in Malayalam cinema, nevertheless, he also had success in other genres, as a villager in the comedy Narendran Makan Jayakanthan Vaka (2001) and as a son to a debt-ridden family in the drama Kasthooriman (2003). His career took a setback after few box office failures during the mid-2000s. He took a break from films in 2006 and moved on to business.

Post a hiatus of three years he returned to films with the 2009 comedy Gulumal: The Escape, a commercial success. After his comeback, Kunchacko completely changed his romantic hero image and he proved his versatility as an actor by doing various different roles. He regained his stardom with commercially successful films and reestablished himself as one of the popular lead actors of Malayalam cinema. His roles in critically and commercially acclaimed films like Traffic (2011), How Old Are You? (2014), Take Off (2017), Vettah (2016), Virus (2019), Anjaam Pathiraa (2020), Nayattu (2021), Pada (2022), Nna Thaan Case Kodu (2022), 2018 (2023), Bougainvillea (2024) and Officer on Duty (2025) were widely appreciated. He won the Kerala State Film Award for his performance in the satire, Nna Thaan Case Kodu and the ensemble survival thriller 2018 (2023) became the highest grossing Malayalam film up to that point. He is also known for his dancing skills.

In 2016, Kunchacko produced the comedy drama film Kochavva Paulo Ayyappa Coelho through Udaya Studios, in the process of reviving the studio after a 30-year hiatus. He also launched another production house, Kunchacko Boban Productions, debuting with the Mahesh Narayanan directorial, Ariyippu (2022), which premiered in the Concorso internazionale of the 75th Locarno Film Festival on 4 August 2022, where it was nominated for Golden Leopard.

== Early life and family ==
Kunchacko Boban (also known as Chackochan) was born in Alappuzha, Kerala. His father, Boban Kunchacko, was also an actor, director, and producer. His mother, Molly, is a housewife and he has two younger sisters, Anu and Minu.

Kunchacko hails from the Maliampurakal family, he was named after his grandfather, the legendary film producer Kunchacko, who established the first film studio in Kerala, Udaya Studios.

His great-grandfather, M. M. Chacko, started the first boat service in Kuttanad. Chacko's son is Navodaya Appachan who established Navodaya Studios. Through Appachan, Kunchacko is also related to Jijo Punnose, who is a film director.

After completing his pre-degree from St. Berchmans College, in 1996, Kunchacko graduated with a first-class in B.Com from Sanatana Dharma College, in 1997.

Kunchacko was an avid sports enthusiast, he played cricket, table tennis, basketball, and was known for his skill in badminton. He was trained in Bharatanatyam during his childhood.

== Personal life ==
Kunchacko Boban married Priya Ann Samuel, on April 2, 2005, at the Little Flower Syro-Malabar Catholic Church in Ernakulam. Their son Izahaak Boban Kunchacko was born on April 16, 2019.

== Acting career ==
=== 1997–2006 ===
Kunchacko Boban was introduced into the Malayalam film industry by versatile director Fazil. His debut film, Aniyathipraavu (1997), co-starring Shalini, and directed by Fazil, turned out to be the highest-grossing Malayalam film ever and Kunchacko Boban's performance as Sudhi, the lead character was well received by young audiences and families. The Kunchacko Boban - Shalini pair was considered one of the best star pairs of the Malayalam film industry.|

Following the success of Aniyathipraavu, Kunchacko Boban was cast in hit films such as Nakshathrathaarattu (1998), Mayilpeelikkavu (1998) and Niram (1999), which was among 1999's highest-grossing Malayalam films and songs of "Niram" are still very popular. The actor reunited with his debut film's director Fazil in Harikrishnans, where he played a cameo, which marked the reunion of Mohanlal and Mammootty after eight years and it was the highest-grossing Malayalam film of the year.| Then he appeared in commercially successful films such as Priyam (2000), Sathyam Sivam Sundaram (2000), Dosth (2001), Narendran Makan Jayakanthan Vaka (2001) and Kalyanaraman (2002).

In 2005, after his marriage, he took a break from films.

=== 2008–present ===
Kunchacko Boban returned to films in 2008 with a special appearance in a song in Twenty:20 and later acted in Shafi's LollyPop. His real comeback was in 2009 with comedy film Gulumal: The Escape, directed by popular ad filmmaker and director V. K. Prakash. Gulumal was followed by a string of successful films which established him as one of the most successful actors of the last decade and he made a complete makeover of his screen image in his comeback.

In 2010 he played the lead role in the films such as Jeethu Joseph's Mummy & Me, Sakudumbam Shyamala and Lal Jose's Elsamma Enna Aankutty, all of which were commercial successes and reviewers praised Kunchacko Boban for his performance in Elsamma Enna Aankutty.

In 2011, he played the central character in the road thriller film Traffic. The film's success and wide critical acclaim ushered in a trend that followed in Malayalam cinema, dubbed the New generation movies. This was followed by another film Seniors where for the first time he took on a negative role playing a criminal, which was commercial success at the box office and he won SIIMA Award for Best Actor in a Negative Role - Malayalam. In the same year he acted again in films like Three Kings, Sevens and Doctor Love. He also won the Youth Icon award at Asianet Film Awards.

In 2012, he was featured in three films, Lal Jose's Spanish Masala, Ordinary and Mallu Singh. In Spanish Masala he played a full-length negative role which had Dileep as main lead. Ordinary had a high opening at the Kerala box office and had 10,000 showings in theatres before reaching the 50-day mark. Mallu Singh is credited as 50th film of Kunchacko Boban. Ordinary and Mallu Singh both films became major commercial success at the box office.

His started 2013 with comedy thriller Romans, which was a blockbuster at the box office and later, 3 Dots, God for Sale: Bhakthi Prasthanam, Kadhaveedu, Vishudhan, and Pullipulikalum Aattinkuttiyum, a commercial success.

Kunchacko Boban also gained critical acclaim for his performance, in films such as God for Sale: Bhakthi Prasthanam (2013), Vishudhan (2013), Kadhaveedu (2013), How Old Are You (2014), Madhura Naranga (2015), Valiya Chirakulla Pakshikal (2015) and Vettah (2016).

He was also a part of Valiya Chirakulla Pakshikal, directed by Dr. Biju, was an eye-opener on how the use of endosulfan affected Northern Kerala villages. The film was screened at the United Nations and was also selected for many world-famous film festivals including the Toronto Film Festival, New York Indian Film Festival, and International Film Festival of India. Valiya Chirakulla Pakshikal earned the national award for Best Film made on environmental preservation.

In 2016, Kunchacko revamped Udaya Pictures, the iconic Malayalam production house. Kochauvva Paulo Ayyappa Coelho marked his debut as a producer under this new film outfit.

The year 2017 saw three films, Take Off, Ramante Eden Thottam and Varnyathil Aashanka, earned him numerous accolades as a mature and versatile actor. Take Off was produced in memory of the late director Rajesh Pillai and earned several awards in State, National and International competitions. The characters of these films earned him the Family Hero award at the Vanitha Film Awards and Best Actor critics award at the Asianet Film Awards. The film also happened to release on the 20th anniversary of his film debut Aniyathipravu.

He began 2018 with back-to-back successful films, Shikkari Shambhu, Kuttanadan Marpappa and Panchavarnathatha. His next two releases were Mangalyam Thanthunanena and Johny Johny Yes Appa. His final release of the year was Lal Jose's Thattumpurath Achuthan.

His releases of 2019 were comedy-thriller Allu Ramendran and a medical thriller Virus. Allu Ramendran met with a positive response and was a commercial success. Virus received critical acclaim and was a major box office success of 2019. His performance in both films was highly praised. His first release of 2020 was crime thriller Anjaam Pathiraa, in which he played the central character, Anwar Hussain. The film received highly positive reviews and becomes the first blockbuster film of 2020 in Malayalam Film Industry. The film considered the highest-grossing Malayalam films of the year grossed ₹50 crores worldwide and also the highest TRP rated Malayalam film of the year across all channels as well as Surya Tv's all-time biggest TRP rated film ever.

He started 2021 with three movies. Nayattu, which was released in theatres on 8 April, was critically acclaimed for showing the truth of the political circus. The movie was later released on Netflix. The other two, Nizhal and Mohan Kumar Fans, were also released in theatres.'Mohan Kumar Fans' was praised for their effective blend of satire and emotional drama. He ended 2021 with Bheemante Vazhi, which saw a theatre release on 3 December 2021. After four weeks of theatrical run, the film was released in Amazon Prime Video on 30 December 2021.

He started 2022 with political social-thriller film Pada and starred in Ariyippu and Nna Thaan Case Kodu later that year. All three films opened to highly positive reviews. Kunchako was a part of the multistarrer 2018 (2023) based on the 2018 Kerala floods.

== Other works ==
Besides his work in films and business, Kunchacko is a supporter of social causes. In 2014, he launched Celebrity Cricket Club (C3), serving as its chairman to unite a group of celebrities who pledged their time and effort to charitable initiatives.

In 2015, he opened the Al Fasht Medical Centre in Sharjah, a medical centre providing comparatively low-cost health care for child behaviour, autism, and adult psychiatry.

== Television ==
Year	Title	Role	Channel	Notes	Ref
2018	Nayika Nayakan	Mentor	Mazhavil Manorama	Reality Show	
2019	Mazhavil Entertainment Awards	Host	Mazhavil Manorama	Award Show	
2020	Star Magic	Himself on Onam Celebration	Flowers TV	Special Guest	
2020	Changanu Chackochan	Himself on Christmas Celebration	Asianet	Special Show	
2021	Funs Upon a Time	Judge	Amrita TV	Reality show	
2021	E-Classil Njanumund	Host	Amrita TV	Happiness Challenge: Social service show	
2021	Anjinodu Injodinju	Contestant	Surya TV	Game show	
2023	Dancing stars	Grand finale judge	Asianet	reality show	
2023	Pullipulikalum Chackochanum	Himself on Onam Celebration	Flowers TV	Special Guest	

== Awards and nominations ==
Year	Award	Category	Film	Result	Ref
Kerala State Film Awards	2022	Special Jury Award (Acting)	Nna Thaan Case Kodu	Won	
Kerala State Film Awards	2004	Special Jury Mention (Acting)	Ee Snehatheerathu	Won	
Locarno Film Festival	2022	Best Actor	Ariyippu	Nominated	
Locarno Film Festival	2022	Best Film	Ariyippu	Nominated	
South Indian International Movie Awards	2012	Best Actor in a Negative Role (Malayalam)	Seniors	Won	
South Indian International Movie Awards	2020	Best Actor (Malayalam)	Anjaam Pathiraa	Nominated	
South Indian International Movie Awards	2020	Best Actor Critics (Malayalam)	Anjaam Pathiraa	Won	
South Indian International Movie Awards	2022	Best Actor (Malayalam)	Nna Thaan Case Kodu	Nominated	
South Indian International Movie Awards	2022	Best Actor Critics (Malayalam)	Nna Thaan Case Kodu	Won	
Filmfare Awards	2010	Best Actor – Malayalam	Elsamma Enna Aankutty	Nominated	
Filmfare Awards	2018	Best Supporting Actor - Malayalam	Take Off	Nominated	
Filmfare Awards	2022	Best Actor - Malayalam	Anjaam Pathiraa	Nominated	
Filmfare Awards	2023	Best Actor – Malayalam	Nna Thaan Case Kodu	Won	
Filmfare Awards	2023	Best Movie – Malayalam	Nna Thaan Case Kodu	Won	
Filmfare Awards	2023	Best Movie (Critics) – Malayalam	Ariyippu	Won	
Kerala Film Critics Association Awards	2022	Best Actor	Nna Thaan Case Kodu, Ariyippu and Pada	Won	
J. C. Daniel Award	2022	Best Actor	Nna Thaan Case Kodu, Ariyippu	Won	
Asiavision Awards	2016	Man of the Year	Kochavva Paulo Ayyappa Coelho and Vettah	Won	
IIFA Utsavam	2016	Best Actor in a Negative Role – Malayalam	Chirakodinja Kinavukal	Nominated	
Asianet Film Awards	2010	Best Star Pair	Mummy & Me	Won	
Asianet Film Awards	2011	Youth Icon of the Year	Various films	Won	
Asianet Film Awards	2012	Special Jury Award	Pullipulikalum Aattinkuttiyum and Romans	Won	
Asianet Film Awards	2014	Youth Icon of the Year	Various films	Won	
Asianet Film Awards	2018	Best Actor critics	Take Off, Ramante Edanthottam and Varnyathil Aashanka	Won	
Vanitha Film Awards	2010	Best Star Pair	Mummy & Me	Won	
Vanitha Film Awards	2018	Best Family Hero	Take Off and Ramante Edanthottam	Won	
Vanitha Film Awards	2020	Socially Responsible Actor	Virus	Won	
Asianet Comedy Awards	2017	Versatile Actor	Various films	Won	
Jai Hind TV Awards	2013	Popular Actor	Various films	Won	
Kerala Kaumudi Awards	2010	Youth Icon	Various films	Won	
CPC Cine Awards	2020	Special Honorary Award	Udaya Studios	Won	
