= Nna Thaan Case Kodu =

- Theatrical release poster
- Directed by: Ratheesh Balakrishnan Poduval
- Written by: Ratheesh Balakrishnan Poduval
- Produced by: Santhosh T. Kuruvilla; Kunchacko Boban; Sheril Rachel Santhosh
- Starring: Kunchacko Boban; Gayathrie Shankar
- Cinematography: Rakesh Haridas
- Edited by: Manoj Kannoth
- Music by: Dawn Vincent
- Production companies: STK Frames; Kunchacko Boban Productions; Udaya Pictures
- Distributed by: Magic Frames
- Release date: 11 August 2022
- Country: India
- Language: Malayalam
- Box office: ₹34.15 crore

Nna Thaan Case Kodu (ന്നാ താൻ കേസ് കൊടു്) (transl. Then you sue me) is a 2022 Malayalam-language satire courtroom comedy film written and directed by Ratheesh Balakrishnan Poduval, produced by Santhosh T. Kuruvilla and co-produced by Kunchacko Boban Productions and Udaya Pictures. The film stars Kunchacko Boban and Gayathrie Shankar (In her Malayalam debut). The music was composed by Dawn Vincent. The story revolves around Kozhummal Rajeevan, a reformed thief's fight for justice when an innocent act to defend himself places him in loggerheads with the high and mighty of society.

Nna Thaan Case Kodu received a U certificate and was released theatrically on 11 August 2022 opened to positive reviews for its humour, screenplay, direction & performances. It was featured at the 54th IFFI Indian panorama section. The film was a blockbuster at box office.

== Plot ==
The film follows Rajeevan Kozhummal, a petty thief who falls in love with Devi, a Tamil woman. After deciding to live together at her residence, Rajeevan abandons his criminal activities and takes up work as a labourer in an effort to lead a lawful life.

One day, while returning from a temple festival, Rajeevan attempts to avoid an oncoming autorickshaw by jumping over the boundary wall of the residence of MLA Kunjikannan. In the process, he is bitten by the politician's pet dogs, Kingini and Painkili. Subsequently, he is accused of theft and arrested.

During the ensuing legal proceedings, Rajeevan chooses to represent himself in court, receiving guidance from Gangadharan, a former police officer who has become an advocate. He undertakes to produce evidence in support of his defence. As the case progresses, Rajeevan contends that the chain of events leading to his arrest originated from a pothole on a public road and consequently implicates Public Works Department Minister K. P. Preman in the matter.

The remainder of the narrative centres on Rajeevan's efforts to obtain evidence and overcome numerous obstacles in his pursuit of justice, while seeking to establish his innocence against the allegations brought against him.

== Cast ==
- Kunchacko Boban as Rajeevan Kozhummal
- Gayathrie Shankar as Devi
- Rajesh Madhavan as Sureshan Kaavunthazhe
- P. P. Kunhikrishnan as Magistrate 1
- Kunhikannan Cheruvathur as Minister K. P. Preman
- Sibi Thomas as Johnny David, Lorry Driver
- A. V. Balakrishnan as Adv. Krishnan
- Adv. Shukkur as Adv. Shukhoor
- Gangadharan Kuttamath as Adv. Gangadharan
- Mridul Nair as Aakash, Biker
- Unnimaya Prasad as Chief Minister Deepa
- Bhanumathi Payyannur as nurse
- Nayana Kishore as associate to Adv. Shukhoor
- Chithra Nair as Sumalatha
- Dr. K. T. Balachandran as Engineer Samuel Pulliullaveetil
- Jacob Mathew as Raghu
- Sudheer C. K. as M. L. A. Kunjikkannan
- Kunjikrishna panicker as Sub Inspector Madhusoodanan
- Basil Joseph as Magistrate 2 (special appearance)
- Ratheesh Balkrishnan Poduval as news reporter (cameo appearance)

== Production ==
=== Development ===
The film was announced on 14 March 2022 by Kunchacko Boban along with a poster on social media, he also revealed that he would be co-producing the film, written and directed by Ratheesh Balakrishnan Poduval. Poduval had earlier tried to cast Kunchacko in his directorial debut Android Kunjappan Version 5.25 (2019), but Kunchacko turned down the role citing that the story was unclear to him. After its release, Kunchacko liked the film and called Poduval and expressed interest for future collaborations. The story of Nna Thaan Case Kodu was discussed with Kunchacko prior to the COVID-19 pandemic in India, it underwent further development after that.

=== Casting ===
For the character, Kunchacko Boban had tanned skin, oiled down hairstyle, and prosthetics on lower jaw. He used Kasargod dialect for the role. Tamil actress Gayathrie Shankar was cast in an important role, and Rajesh Madhavan also plays a supporting role. The rest of the cast was made up of several newcomers who were chosen through auditions.

== Music ==
Nna Thaan Case Kodu

Soundtrack album by Dawn Vincent
- Released: 13 August 2022
- Recorded: 2022
- Studios: Noise Head Quarters, Kochi
- Genre: Film soundtrack
- Length: 6:31
- Language: Malayalam
- Label: 123 Musix Entertainments Pvt. Ltd.
- Producer: Dawn Vincent

Dawn Vincent chronology
Kuttavum Shikshayum (2022)	Nna Thaan Case Kodu (2022)	The Teacher (2022)
External audio
- Original Motion Picture Soundtrack, from Spotify

The soundtrack album features two songs composed, programmed, and arranged by Dawn Vincent with lyrics penned by Vaishakh Sugunan. The first song "Aadalodakam" was released on 11 July 2022 on YouTube. Second song from the album titled "Padakkoppila" was released on 4 September 2022.

Nna Thaan Case Kodu (Original Motion Picture Soundtrack)
No.	Title	Lyrics	Singer(s)	Length
1.	"Aadalodakam"	Vaisakh Sugunan	Shahabaz Aman, Soumya Ramakrishnan, Dawn Vincent	3:13
2.	"Padakkoppila"	Vaisakh Sugunan	Dawn Vincent, Vipin Raveendran	3:18

The movie features a remix version of yesteryear song Devadoothar Padi from the movie Kathodu Kathoram. The music video was released on Millennium Audios' YouTube channel on 25 July 2022.

"Devadoothar Paadi"

Single by Biju Narayanan

from the album Nna Than Case Kodu
- Language: Malayalam
- Released: 25 July 2022
- Studio: Noise Head Quarters, Kochi
- Length: 5:44
- Label: Millennium Audios
- Composer: Ouseppachan
- Lyricist: O. N. V. Kurup
- Producer: Dawn Vincent
External audio
- Devadoothar Paadi from Spotify
- Devadoothar Paadi on YouTube

Originally composed by Ouseppachan, The music video featuring lead actor Kunchacko Boban's delectably humorous dance sequence as a typical Malayali drunkard often seen during a stage show in a local festival of Kerala, became trending on YouTube and was an instant hit after on release.

== Release ==
=== Theatrical ===
The release date was revealed through a poster featuring a newspaper article about a robber who was injured by a dog while attempting to steal into an MLA home. The film was released on theatres on 11 August 2022.

=== Home media ===
The digital rights of the film is acquired by Disney+ Hotstar and started streaming from 8 September 2022 on the occasion of Thiruvonam. The satellite rights of the film is owned by Asianet. The film premiered on 25 December 2022 on occasion of Christmas.

== Reception ==
=== Critical reception ===
For Firstpost, film critic Anna M. M. Vetticad ranked it fifth in her year-end list of best Malayalam films. S. R. Praveen of The Hindu wrote, "Nna Thaan Case Kodu is a biting satire which coasts along on the strength of a humorous script and a set of earnest performances." Sajin Shrijith of The New Indian Express gave the film a rating of 4 out of 5 and stated, "Nna Thaan Case Kodu is a rare, one-of-a-kind experience that only comes along once in a blue moon, with enough merits that lend themselves well to the big screen."

== Accolades ==
Award	Category	Recipient	Ref.
Kerala Film Critics Association Awards	Best Popular Film	Nna Thaan Case Kodu	
Kerala Film Critics Association Awards	Best Actor	Kunchacko Boban	
53rd Kerala State Film Awards	Best Film with Popular Appeal and Aesthetic Value	Nna Thaan Case Kodu	
53rd Kerala State Film Awards	Special Jury Award for Acting	Kunchacko Boban	
53rd Kerala State Film Awards	Best Character Actor	P.P. Kunhikrishnan	
53rd Kerala State Film Awards	Best Original Screenplay	Ratheesh Balakrishna Poduval	
53rd Kerala State Film Awards	Best Background Music	Dawn Vincent	
53rd Kerala State Film Awards	Best Art Director	Jyothish Shankar	
53rd Kerala State Film Awards	Best Sound Mixing	Vipin Nair	
68th Filmfare Awards South	Best Film – Malayalam	Santhosh T. Kuruvilla; Kunchacko Boban; Sheril Rachel Santhosh	
68th Filmfare Awards South	Best Actor – Malayalam	Kunchacko Boban	
68th Filmfare Awards South	Best Director – Malayalam	Ratheesh Balakrishnan Poduval	
11th South Indian International Movie Awards	Best Actor – Malayalam	Kunchacko Boban	
11th South Indian International Movie Awards	Best Debut Actress – Malayalam	Gayathrie Shankar	
11th South Indian International Movie Awards	Best Debut Actor – Malayalam	P.P. Kunhikrishnan	
11th South Indian International Movie Awards	Best Comedian – Malayalam	Rajesh Madhavan	

== Spin-off ==
Sureshanteyum Sumalathayudeyum Hrudayahariyaya Pranayakadha directed by Ratheesh Balakrishnan Poduval is a spin-off of the film starring Rajesh Madhavan and Chithra respiring the character of this film. Kunchacko Boban also reprises his role of Kozhummal Rajeevan in a cameo appearance. The film released on 16 May 2024.
