= Kolaramma =

Temple and presiding deity of Kolar, Karnataka, India

Kolaramma Temple
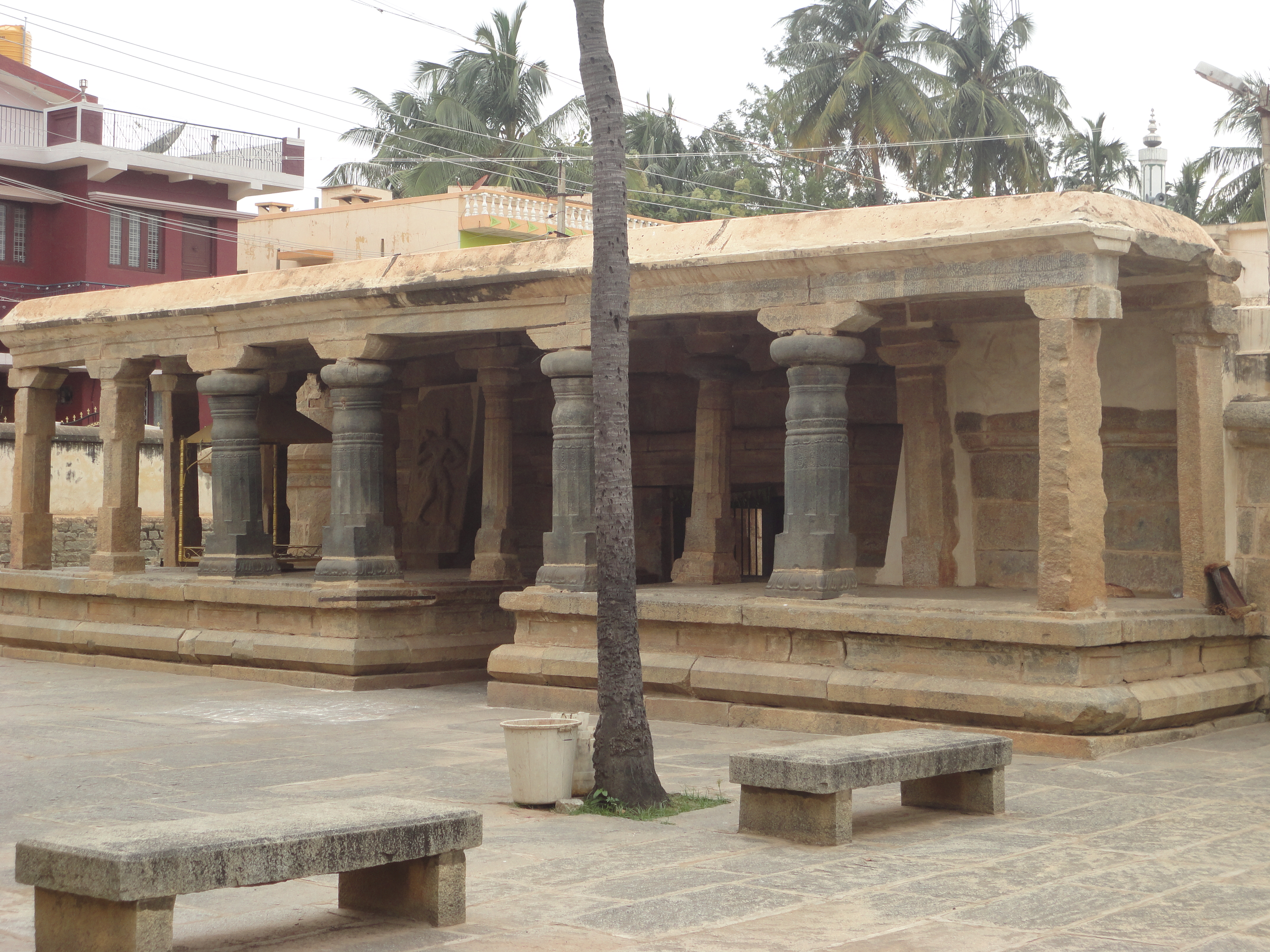

Religion
- Affiliation: Hinduism
- District: Kolar
- Deity: Kolaramma

Location
- Location: Kolar
- State: Karnataka
- Country: India
- Interactive map of Kolaramma Temple

Kolaramma is the presiding deity of the town of Kolar in Karnataka, India. The Kolaramma temple is thousand years old and built by the Thalakadu Gangas in the South Indian style. Later it was developed by the Cholas. The erstwhile maharajas of Mysore frequently visited this temple to get the blessings of Kolaramma. The temple itself has beautifully carved statues and designs all done using the abundantly available granite stones.

Another deity of this temple is Chelamma or the scorpion goddess. People believe that by praying at the Chelamma shrine a person will be guarded from scorpion stings by the deity. Another interesting thing about the temple is the hundi or the well which is used to collect money offerings from the people, and it is a tradition to at least put one coin into the small opening on the floor of the temple, which apparently is a large hole dug into the earth, one can still hear the clicking sounds of coins accumulated over hundreds of years.

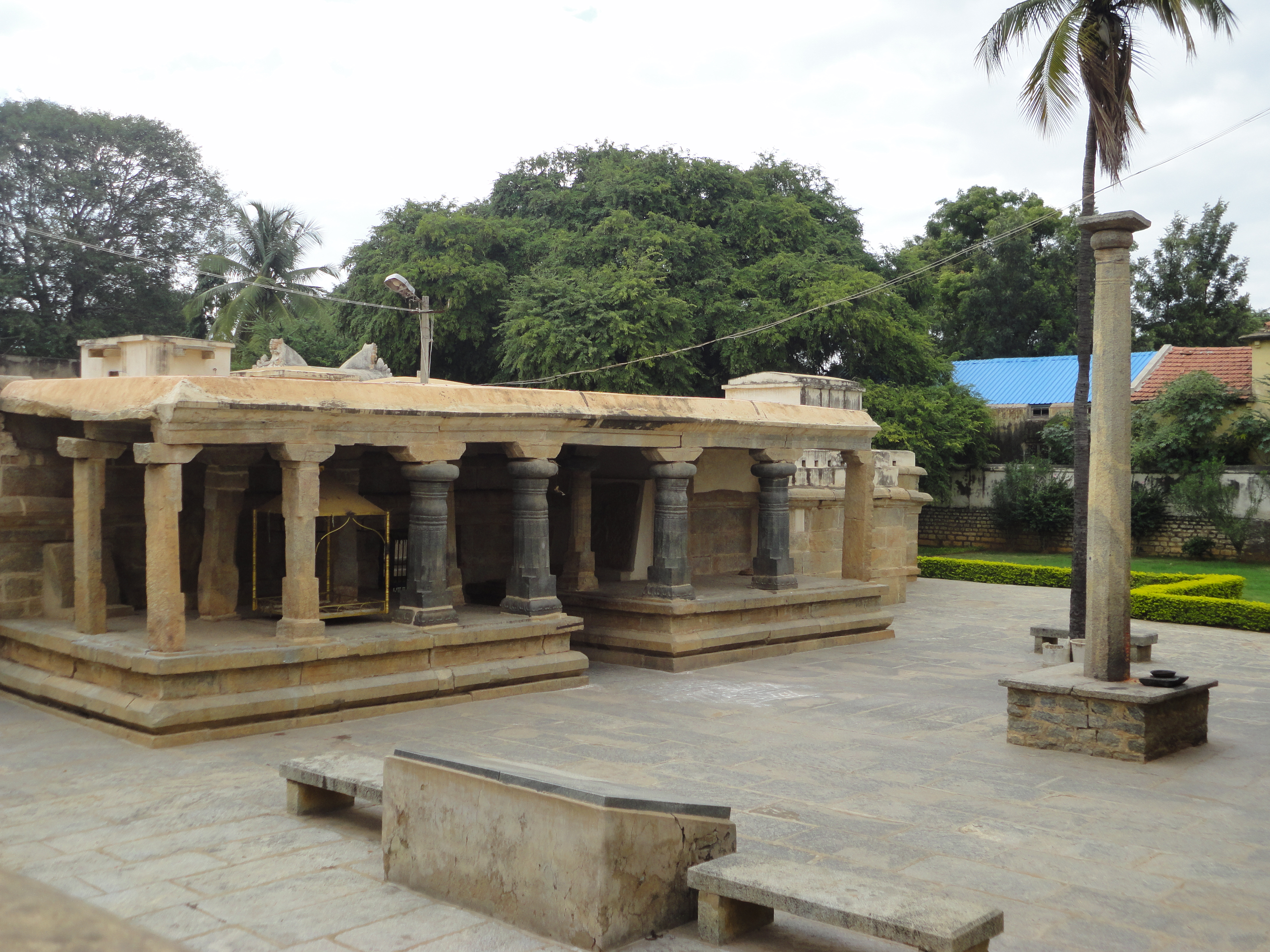
Kolarmma Temple, Kolar

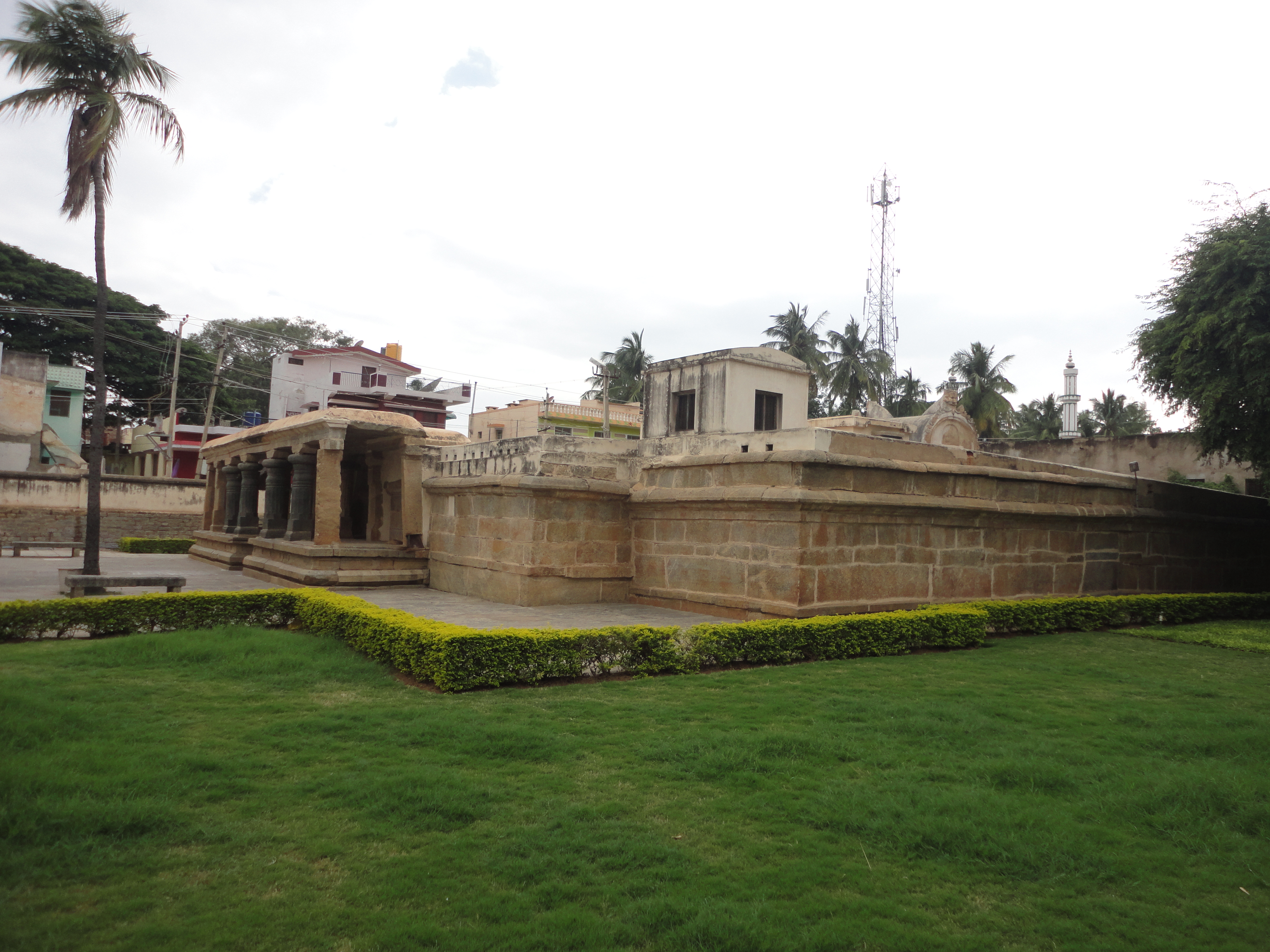
Kolarmma Temple, Kolar - Full View
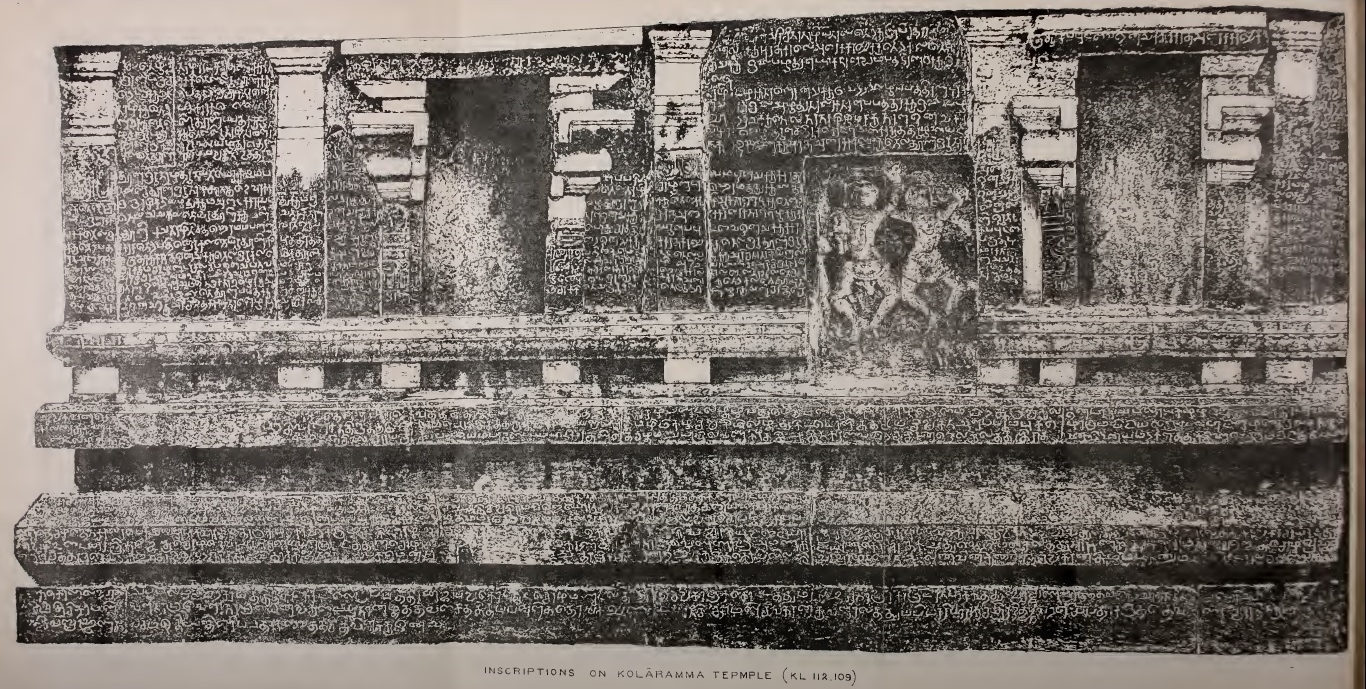
Chola Inscriptions on Kolaramma Temple (KL 112 109)

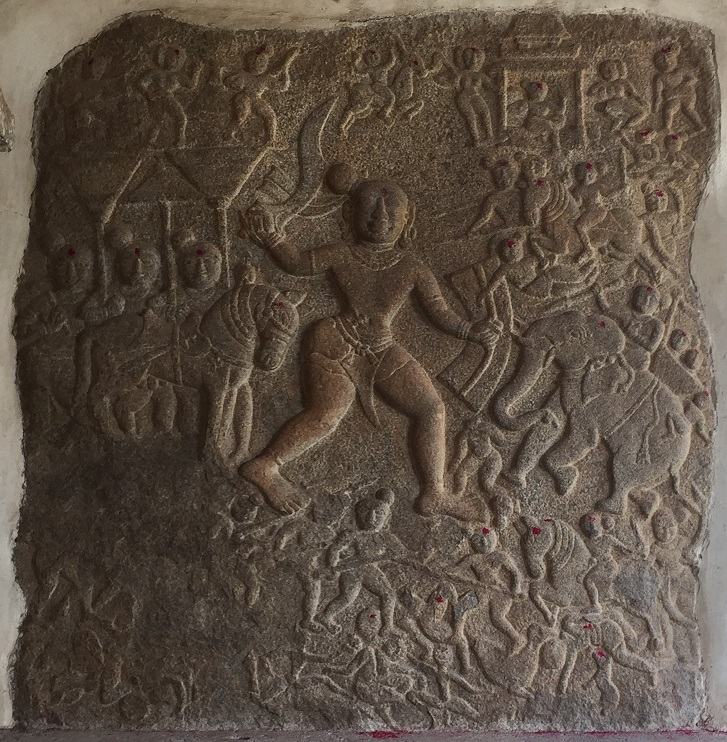
Rajendra Chola I in Battle, Kolaramma Temple
