= Chelamma =

Hindu goddess

Chelamma is a Hindu goddess of the Southern Karnataka region of India.

Chelamma is a Scorpion goddess and is worshipped along with Kolaramma in Kolar.

Followers believe that by praying at Chelamma's shrine dedicated to goddess Parvati, a person will be protected from scorpion stings. There is an ancient hundi which is carved down into the ground and people have been offering gifts or Kanike to it for the last 1,000 years and no one has ever opened it. According to legend, the box contains gold coins and precious gems from ancient times.

The name includes the suffix "amma" which is a common suffix for most South Indian goddesses. (See Amman)
