= Gunaa =

1991 film by Santhana Bharathi

- Theatrical release poster
- Directed by: Santhana Bharathi
- Written by: Sab John; Balakumaran (dialogues)
- Produced by: Alamelu Subramaniam
- Starring: Kamal Haasan; Rekha; Roshini
- Cinematography: Venu
- Edited by: B. Lenin; V. T. Vijayan
- Music by: Ilaiyaraaja
- Production company: Swathi Chithra International
- Distributed by: Raaj Kamal Films International
- Release date: 5 November 1991
- Running time: 167 minutes
- Country: India
- Language: Tamil

Gunaa is a 1991 Indian Tamil-language psychological romantic drama film directed by Santhana Bharathi and co-written by Sab John. The film stars Kamal Haasan, Rekha and newcomer Roshini (in her only film appearance). The story revolves Gunaa (Haasan) who kidnaps an heiress (Rohini) to make her fall in love with him. He believes she is an avatar of goddess Abhirami and it is his destiny to marry her.

Haasan and John initially planned to make a film set in Sri Lanka during a time of insurgency, but the project was dropped over story concerns. John later developed the story of Gunaa, inspired partly by a mentally-ill person he knew. The dialogues were written by Balakumaran, cinematography was handled by Venu and editing by B. Lenin and V. T. Vijayan. The film was mostly shot around Kodaikanal, including a cave then known as Devil's Kitchen.

Gunaa was released on 5 November 1991, Diwali day. It was critically acclaimed for its unique theme and performances, but had an average run at the box office. The film won a Tamil Nadu State Film Award, a Filmfare Award, and two Cinema Express Awards. It acquired cult status in Tamil cinema and inspired more films about mentally obsessed lovers, while Devil's Kitchen became a popular tourist spot after the film's release and later known as Guna Caves.

== Plot ==
Gunaa is an asylum inmate. His cellmate tells him a story whose protagonist, Abhirami, gets deeply ingrained in Gunaa's mind; he believes and dreams that she is an avatar of the Hinduism goddess Abhirami who would marry him on a full moon day. After his psychiatric test, his psychiatrist Ganesh sanctions his release, but Gunaa keeps searching for Abhirami. His mother Manonmani runs a brothel after his father deserted her. Her brother-in-law, addressed as "Chitappa", is her aide. Rosy, one of the brothel girls, loves and desires to marry Gunaa, but he does not reciprocate.

Gunaa is an expert at breaking open locks, and Chitappa regularly takes his assistance for stealing. Chitappa decides to break open a hundi at a nearby temple to pay Manonmani's overdue rent. When he takes Gunaa for a rehearsal, Gunaa spots a wealthy heiress in the temple. Since her physical attributes match those of Abhirami as imagined by Gunaa, he approaches her and she smilingly gives him some sweets; her pleasant disposition convinces him that she is Abhirami.

On the scheduled day of heist, Chitappa, Gunaa and their men arrive at the temple. Gunaa opens the lock of the safe room and lets Chitappa's men inside. Seeing the heiress again, he goes after her, accidentally locking Chitappa's men inside. They are caught by officials but manage to escape with some jewels and flee with Gunaa via car. One of them dies when the car crashes, the wounded survivor seizes the heiress's car and starts driving it, with Gunaa also joining.

The wounded man succumbs, and the car falls into the sea. Ramaiah, a CBI officer, investigates the heiress's disappearance, and informs her guardian Suresh Kumar (SK). Having saved the heiress and the jewels from drowning, Gunaa takes them to his house. Landlord Ismail sees the financial reward in a newspaper for the safe return of the heiress. His goons assume her to be a new prostitute brought in without paying their usual bribe and fight with Gunaa. To save her, Gunaa drives her to a dilapidated church on a hilltop, and keeps addressing her as "Abhirami".

The heiress hates Gunaa for his weird nature and tries to escape, but fails every time. With Chitappa's help, SK and Ismail reach the church; SK coerces the heiress, whose real name is Rohini, to sign blank papers so he can control all her wealth. She assents to avoid being killed, but SK tries to kill her anyway. Gunaa intervenes, kills Ismail, knocks SK out and takes the injured Rohini to a cave for safety. Though she first hated Gunaa, she now understands his deep love. She reveals her real name, but prefers the name Abhirami and accepts Gunaa's marriage proposal. Though Gunaa is adamant on marrying on a full moon day, Rohini convinces him it is that day and marries him.

The next morning, Gunaa realises that Rohini has contracted fever; he approaches a doctor to treat her. The doctor's assistant, having seen Gunaa on a newspaper, informs Inspector Moovendhar. When Moovendhar arrives, Gunaa steals a gun and forcibly takes the doctor to the cave. Near the spot, both men are surrounded by numerous policemen led by Moovendhar; Gunaa accidentally shoots a policeman before retreating to the cave where the doctor treats Rohini. Moovendhar seeks more forces and issues a shoot-at-sight order against Gunaa.

Gunaa's kin including Ganesh, Manonmani, Rosy and Ramaiah reach the spot and tell Moovendhar not to kill Gunaa. Rosy enters the cave and requests Gunaa to return the gun which he does through Rosy while remaining inside. Moovendhar then orders Gunaa to surrender. Rohini informs Moovendhar that they are fine, coming out and decides to report SK's crimes. SK overhears this and, to hide his crimes, shoots Rohini. Infuriated, Gunaa kills him. When Gunaa returns, Rohini succumbs in his arms. Gunaa then angrily tells his kin that humans cannot understand his love for Abhirami, and jumps off the cliff with Rohini's corpse. That night, the full moon emerges.

== Cast ==
- Kamal Haasan as Gunaa
- Rekha as Rosy (Voice dubbed by KR Anuradha)
- Roshini as Rohini (Abhirami) (Voice dubbed by Saritha)
- Janagaraj as Chitappa
- S. P. Balasubrahmanyam as Ramaiah
- Girish Karnad as Ganesh
- Sharat Saxena as Suresh Kumar (SK)
- Pradeep Shakthi as Ismail
- Ananthu as Gunaa's cellmate
- Sethu Vinayagam as the doctor
- Ajay Rathnam as Moovendhar
- S. Varalakshmi as Manonmani
- Kaka Radhakrishnan as Madasami
- R. S. Shivaji as the barber (uncredited)

== Production ==
=== Development ===
The director Sibi Malayil, cinematographer Venu and actor Kamal Haasan had planned to make a film set in Sri Lanka during a time of insurgency, written by Sab John. The trio met Cho Ramaswamy to learn more about the various issues in the country, but he criticised their desire to tell such a story, resulting in the project being dropped. John later told Haasan about a mentally-ill person nicknamed "Pottan" (Fool) who he knew in his childhood. This led to the development of a new screenplay, with the protagonist based partly on Pottan. Sibi Malayil left the project because of Haasan's control, resulting in Santhana Bharathi replacing him. The film was produced by Alamelu Subramaniam under Swathi Chithra International, and the dialogues were written by Balakumaran. Venu remained cinematographer, and editing was handled by B. Lenin and V. T. Vijayan. The film was originally titled Mathikettan Solai, but later retitled Gunaa after its protagonist due to belief that the original title, which relates to insanity, had negative connotations.

=== Casting and filming ===
In portraying the title character, Haasan went on a diet and lost a substantial amount of weight, besides applying makeup to darken his complexion. For the scenes near the climax, his makeup included many cuts and burns on the face, along with the appearance of a protruding eye. Rohini Kudange, a student of Daisy Irani's acting classes was selected as the female lead Rohini / Abhirami, was given the screen name Roshini, and her voice was dubbed by actress Saritha. Gunaa was the only film she ever acted in. Haasan initially wanted Cochin Haneefa to play Suresh Kumar / SK, a role that ultimately went to Sharat Saxena. This was the final film where Janagaraj and Haasan appeared together as, during a dubbing session, cast member R. S. Shivaji disagreed with his dubbing style and requested it be redone, to which Janagaraj refused, leading to a physical dispute between the actors. Bharathi and Haasan sided with Shivaji, angering Janagaraj.

The pre-credit scene where Gunaa walks around in circles in an asylum with the camera following him was a shot in a single take after a day of rehearsing. The dilapidated church where Gunaa initially keeps Rohini captive was a set designed by art director Magie at a forest named Mathikettan Solai. The church resembled an old building built 70 years ago. The Kodaikanal caves which the film was shot in, including the song "Kanmani Anbodu Kadhalan", were then called Devil's Kitchen. Sathy who worked as production controller for the film revealed that "the cave was about 500 to 600 deep [..] we tied ropes with pulleys and transferred all the production equipments in and out of the 500 feet cave". Shooting took place for 45 days at the caves. According to Santhana Bharathi, he insisted Haasan to have a dummy used for climax portions similar to his face and physique but was turned down by Haasan.

== Themes ==
Gunaa has been compared to Tie Me Up! Tie Me Down! (1990) as both films involve the deranged protagonist abducting a woman he believes he is destined to marry, First Blood (1982) because of the protagonist's war against the police, and Rain Man (1988) because the protagonist is shown to have certain "extraordinary talents" despite being mentally ill. Haasan said the tracking shots in the early portions of the film were inspired from films directed by Max Ophüls. He also said that the scene where Gunaa fights with the police and his gun goes off was meant to be a tribute to his favourite actor Dilip Kumar's 1961 film Gunga Jumna. Haasan compared Gunaa to the poet Subramania Bharati, "who to his contemporaries was mad and to some a poet". Hari Narayan of The Hindu compared Gunaa to Moondram Pirai (1982), saying that in both films the protagonist's image of an ideal dreamgirl animate his antics. Srivatsan, writing for India Today, believes the death of Gunaa and Rohini on a full moon day "represents time and a metaphorical implication of immortality and eternity. [...] Gunaa, whose journey begins on a full-moon day, ends on the same day."

== Soundtrack ==
The music composed by Ilaiyaraaja, and the lyrics were written by Vaali. The song "Kanmani Anbodu Kadhalan" became a milestone in Tamil cinema for the way it mixed dialogue and lyrics. The song "Paartha Vizhi" is set in Pavani, a Carnatic raga. For the dubbed Telugu version Guna, the lyrics were written by Vennelakanti.

Tamil track listing
No.	Title	Lyrics	Singer(s)	Length
1.	"Appan Endrum"	Vaali	Ilaiyaraaja	4:39
2.	"Unnai Naan"	Vaali	S. Janaki, Ustad Sultan Khan	7:05
3.	"Paartha Vizhi"	Abhirami Pattar, Vaali	K. J. Yesudas	2:33
4.	"Kanmani Anbodu Kadhalan"	Vaali	Kamal Haasan, S. Janaki	5:27
5.	"Unnai Naan" (Bit)	Vaali	S. Varalakshmi	0:38
6.	"Oyilala"	—	Chorus	1:57
Total length:				22:19

All lyrics are written by Vennelakanti.

Telugu track listing
No.	Title	Singer(s)	Length
1.	"Vunna Neekorake"	S. P. Sailaja
2.	"Kammani Ee Premalekhale (Priyathama Neevachata Kusalama)"	S. P. Balasubrahmanyam, S. P. Sailaja
3.	"Koyilalo"	Swarnalatha
4.	"Picchi Brahma Aaduttuna"	Madhavapeddi Ramesh
5.	"Sambhavi"	S. P. Balasubrahmanyam

== Release ==
Gunaa was released on 5 November 1991, that year's Diwali day, and faced competition from another Diwali release, Thalapathi. Despite receiving critical acclaim, it was average at the box office due to its experimental nature.

=== Reception ===
On 24 November 1991, Ananda Vikatan appreciated the film and mentioned that Haasan had expanded the boundaries of his acting and had achieved a landmark success in this film, concluding that only Haasan could play this role effortlessly. Sundarji of Kalki appreciated the film for its cinematography, music and the cast performances. N. Krishnaswamy of The Indian Express wrote, "Gunaa, while having as its central character a man who is a mystic of sorts, a dreamer who wants to rise about the mire that he finds himself in and those around him hopelessly lodged in, lets loose a trail of violence which I for one found difficult to stomach [...] One comes out with the impression that the [Kamal Haasan] of the film is such a curious blend of Raj Kapoor, Sylvester Stallone and Dustin Hoffman". Nalini Rajan of Madras Musings wrote, "The film's genius really lies in the superfluous and seemingly irrelevant details. The pace, as in real life itself, is relentless".

=== Accolades ===
Event	Category	Recipients	Ref.
Tamil Nadu State Film Awards	Best Film – Third prize	Gunaa	
39th Filmfare Awards South	Best Actor – Tamil	Kamal Haasan	
12th Cinema Express Awards	Best Actor (Special)	Kamal Haasan	
12th Cinema Express Awards	Best Dialogue Writer	Balakumaran	
Film Fan's Association Awards	Best Actor	Kamal Haasan	

== Legacy ==
Gunaa acquired cult status in Tamil cinema, and inspired more films about mentally obsessed lovers such as Kaadhal Kondein (2003), Chinna (2005), and Kadhalil Vizhunthen (2008). Santhana Bharathi listed it as one of the favourite films he has directed. The Devil's Kitchen became a tourist spot after the film's release and it later became known as "Guna Caves".

== In popular culture ==
Gunaa was parodied many times in various films. In a comedy scene from Ullam Kollai Poguthae (2001), Arivu (Vivek) imitates Haasan's style of rounding from Gunaa revealing the difficulties he faced due to water, he utters "Sivagami" in the same way which Gunaa utters "Abhirami". In Arul (2004), the title character's friend (Vaiyapuri) sings "Kanmani Anbodu Kadhalan" which results in him getting whacked by Kanmani (Jyothika). In Adi Thadi (2004), Thiruppathi (Sathyaraj) narrates a letter to Priya (Rathi) with his assistant scribing it. When Thiruppathi asks the letter to be read, the assistant sings the opening address "Ammani anbodu kadhalan ayya ezhudhum kaduthasi" (transl. Ammani, with love a lover writes you this letter) to the tune of "Kanmani Anbodu Kadhalan", to which Thiruppathi replies "Paatave paaditiya" (transl. You read it as a song?) in the same tone as Gunaa.

Malayalam director Sathyan Anthikad said that the female character Kanmani from his directorial Rasathanthram (2006) was inspired from the song "Kanmani Anbodu Kadhalan". In Thaamirabharani (2007), Meena (Aarthi) mistakes Bharani (Vishal) as Gunaa in a parody of the queue sequence from "Paartha Vizhi" song (along with shots from the original sequence) when Bharani approaches Sakunthaladevi (Nadhiya) who is handing food to devotees, in a manner that unsettles her with the fear that he might kiss her hands the same way as Gunaa kisses Abirami's hands. In the 2015 Malayalam film Premam, Shambu (Shabareesh Varma) teasingly sings "Kanmani Anbodu Kadhalan" as his friend George (Nivin Pauly) express his silent love interest for Malar (Sai Pallavi). In Sangili Bungili Kadhava Thorae (2017), the queue sequence from "Paartha Vizhi" song is parodied as Soornam (Soori) approaches E.B Rajeswari (Kovai Sarala) in a queue of people waiting to pay their electricity bills. In The Greatest of All Time (2024), Jeevan (Vijay) sings the song after harming Srinidhi (Meenakshi Chaudhary). A Malaysian Tamil telefilm titled Kanmani Anbodu Kadhalan was released in 2020 on Astro Vaanavil.

The 2024 Malayalam film Manjummel Boys set in Kodaikanal pays tribute to Gunaa by using the song "Kanmani Anbodu" in the starting credits and at several points in the film.

== Re-release ==
Gunaa was scheduled to re-release in theatres on 21 June 2024, by the film production company Pyramid. However, its release was stalled by the Madras High Court based on a complaint filed by Ghanshyam Hemdev, who claimed to have purchased the copyright. The ban was lifted that September, and the release was scheduled for 29 November 2024.

== Controversy ==
On 22 May 2024, music composer Ilaiyaraaja issued a formal notice to the producers of Manjummel Boys for the unauthorised use of his song "Kanmani Anbodu Kadhalan" from Gunaa. The notice, addressed to Soubin Shahir, Babu Shahir, and Shawn Antony of Parava Films, asserts Ilaiyaraaja's legal and moral rights over the song and reserves the right to initiate legal action.

== Bibliography ==
- Dhananjayan, G. (2011). The Best of Tamil Cinema, 1931 to 2010: 1977–2010. Galatta Media. OCLC 733724281.
- Rajadhyaksha, Ashish; Willemen, Paul (1998) [1994]. Encyclopaedia of Indian Cinema. British Film Institute and Oxford University Press. ISBN 0-19-563579-5.
