= Scorpion man =

Akkadian mythological creatures

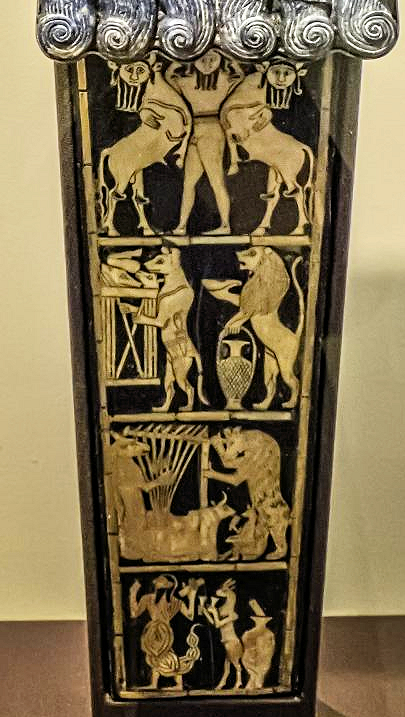
3A scorpion-man appears in the bottom panel of this Bull Lyre (ca. 2450 BCE), now in the Penn Museum in Philadelphia, which was excavated from Ur by the archaeologist Sir Leonard Woolley.

Scorpion-men (Akkadian: 𒄈𒋰𒇽𒍇𒇻, romanized: girtablullû) feature in several Akkadian-language myths from ancient Mesopotamia, including the epic Enûma Elish and the Standard Babylonian version of the Epic of Gilgamesh.

In the visual arts, the form of scorpion-men varies, though they often have the head, torso, and arms of a man and the body and tail of a scorpion.

== Mythology and visual art ==
Scorpion-men appear in the visual arts of Mesopotamia and ancient Iran before we know them from literature. Among the earliest representations of scorpion-men are an example from Jiroft in Iran, as well as a depiction on the Bull Lyre from the Early Dynastic Period city of Ur.

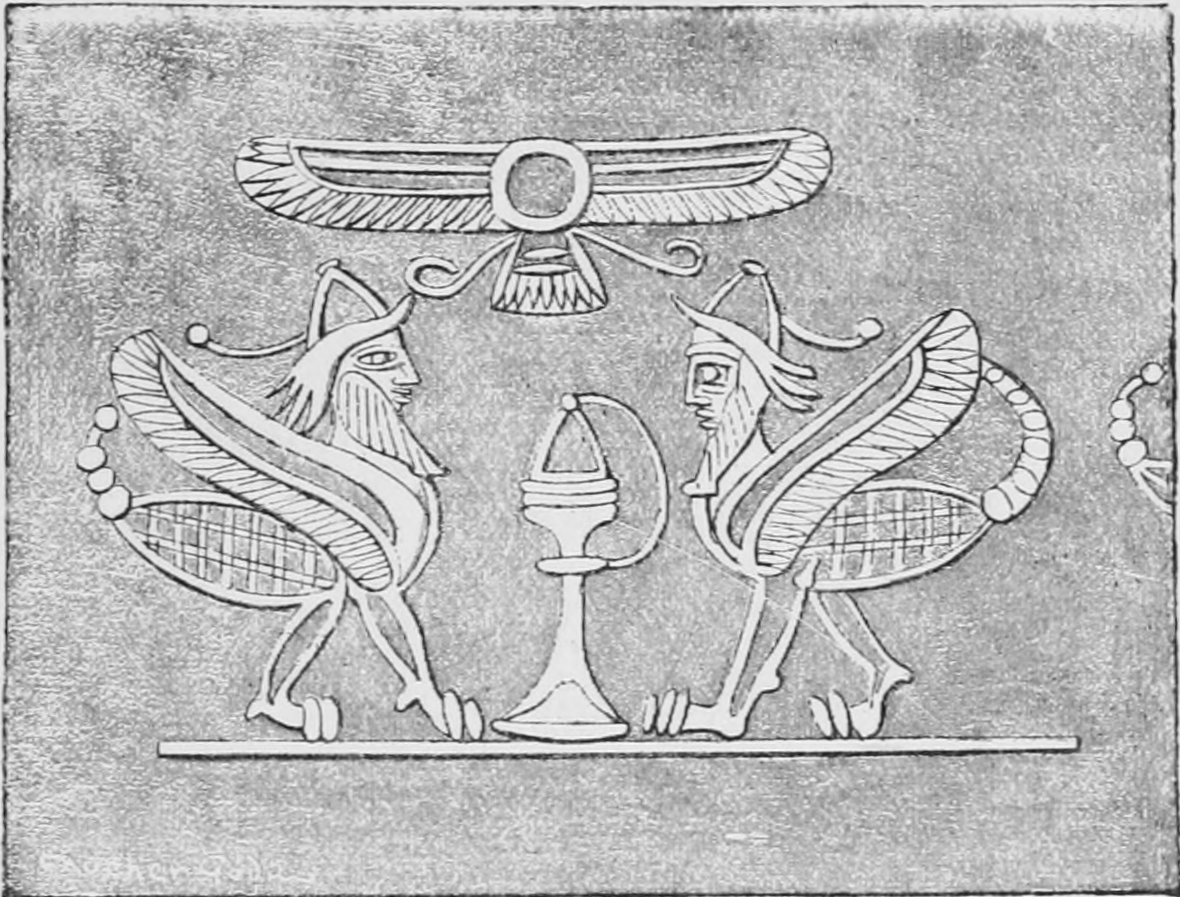
Drawing of an Assyrian intaglio depicting scorpion men.

In the epic poem Enuma elish, a scorpion-man is listed among the monsters created by Tiamat in order to wage war against the gods for murdering her mate Apsu.

In the Standard Babylonian Epic of Gilgamesh, they stand guard outside the gates of the sun god Shamash at the mountains of Mashu. These give entrance to Kurnugi, the land of darkness. The scorpion-men open the doors for Shamash as he travels out each day, and close the doors after him when he returns through the netherworld at night. When Gilgamesh comes to Mount Mashu, he encounters scorpion-men guarding the gate. Their "terror is awesome" and their "glance is death" (Tablet IX 43).

== Scorpion-women ==
Scorpion-women appear in the Standard Babylonian Epic of Gilgamesh, during Gilgamesh's encounter with the scorpion-men (Tablet IX 37-135). The scorpion-man tells his "female" (presumably a scorpion-woman, here seen for the first time), that Gilgamesh carries the flesh of the gods in his body. The scorpion-man's "woman" responds, in defining lines, that Gilgamesh is two-thirds god but one-third human (Tablet IX 51). Rivkah Harris saw the scorpion-women, like the wife of Utnapishtim in Tablet XI, as traditional and passive wives, whose position was "relational, given definition as wife or daughter". Karen Sonik has recently challenged this interpretation, observing that the scorpion-woman, like the other women of the epic, "[demonstrates] a striking visual and perceptual acuity" in her recognition of Gilgamesh's true nature.

== See also ==
- Scorpion goddess
