= Kanmani Anbodu Kadhalan =

- album cover

Song by Kamal Haasan, S. Janaki

from the album Gunaa
- Released: 1991
- Length: 5:27
- Label: Pyramid Audio
- Composer: Ilaiyaraaja
- Lyricist: Vaali
- Producer: Ilaiyaraaja

Gunaa track listing
- 1. "Appan Endrum"; 2. "Unnai Naan"; 3. "Paartha Vizhi"; 4. "Kanmani Anbodu Kadhalan"; 5. "Unnai Naan (Bit)"; 6. "Oyilala"

Music video
- "Kanmani Anbodu Kadhalan" on YouTube

"Kanmani Anbodu Kadhalan" (transl. To my love, Kanmani) is a song from the Tamil film Gunaa (1991) composed by Ilaiyaraaja, written by Vaali and sung by Kamal Haasan and S. Janaki. The song was noticed for having dialogues interspersed between the lines, and it was notably one of the few conversational songs in Tamil cinema.

== About the song ==
Rohini (Roshini) is being held hostage by Gunaa (Kamal Haasan) in a cave near Kodaikanal. He recites the lines he wants to sing for her as she is his sweetheart. Meanwhile, she also develops a soft-spot for him and sings the lines he suggests.

== Production ==
Ilaiyaraaja was told the situation of the scene and someone suggested that the song be made in a similar fashion to "Anbulla Mannavane" from Kuzhandaiyum Deivamum (1965) but different. Kamal Haasan was already decided to be the singer before the song was made. Since Haasan already wrote the dialogues of the song himself, Vaali only wrote the lyrics for the song. Haasan called the song "a love letter" between Ilaiyaraaja and himself. Santhana Bharathi said, "The song could apply to any two people who have immense affection for each other. Kamal Haasan-Ilaiyaraaja or Kamal Haasan and myself for the bonding we have had". The song was initially supposed to be shot in a set until after several days, a trekking guide introduced them to Devil's Kitchen. Upon entering the caves, Bharathi and Haasan were adamant that they would shoot the song there. The forest department helped ensure that the film crew was safe while shooting. The song was shot at night.

== Themes and influences ==
The relationship between Gunaa and Rohini as shown in the song was considered to be love in the 1990s, but in modern times, it may also be considered as Stockholm syndrome. According to Vishnu Sivasankar, the song can also be about the love and non-sexual affection in friendship such as bromance as shown by the song's placement throughout the 2024 Malayalam film Manjummel Boys (2024).

== Selected lyrics ==
Transliteration	English Translation	Ref.
Kanmani anbodu kadhalan yezhudhum kadithame	To my love, Kanmani, I write you this letter.	
Oh, paatave padichittiya	Oh, you have composed a song out of this	
Mandihar unarthukkola ithu manitha kadhal alla, athaiyum thaandi punithamaanathu	the immortal love that cannot be understood by humans	
undana kaayam engum thannale aari pogum maayam enna, ponmane	what is the magic behind my wounds healing on their own?	
enna kaayam aana podhu en meni thaangi kollum undhan meni thaangadhu sendhene	Whatever be the wound, I will bear. But, will you be able to bear it, honey?	
Endhan kadhal enna vendru sollamal enga enga azhugai vandhadhu, endhan sogam unnai thaakum endrennum podhu vandha azhugai nindradhu	I get tears when I'm not able to express my love. But my tears stop when I think that my sadness will have an effect on you	

== Impact ==
The line "Abhirami Abhirami" became popular and men would whisper these lines at women's colleges. Stella Maris College alumnus Ray Simon said, "The lyrics had depth and the melody was soothing. [...] Every time I hear the song or hum it, it takes me back to those good old days of kanmanis and kadhals (transl. women and men falling in love in college)". The song plays during the end credits of the Malaysian film Ops Kossa Dappa (2004). A film named Manitha Kadhal Alla was released in 2015. The song "Namma Thamizh Folku" from Dada (2023) has a line "Oh, paatave paditingala" (transl. Oh, you sang it as a song) based on "Oh, paatave padichittiya".

== Other versions ==
The Telugu dubbed version of the song "Kammani Ee Premalekha" (also called "Priyathama Neevachata Kusalama") was also popular. In 2018, Sanah Moidutty recreated a cover version of the song. In 2024, DJ Revvy created a remix version of the song.

== Charts ==
Chart performances for "Kanmani Anbodu Kadhalan"
Chart (2024)	Peak position
India (Instagram) DJ Revvy remix	1
