= Guna Caves rescue =

2006 rescue in Tamil Nadu, India

- Date: 3 September 2006
- Location: Guna Caves
- Injuries: 1

On 3 September 2006, Subhash Chandran fell into Guna Caves in Tamil Nadu, India and was rescued by his friend Siju David. This is the only known case where a person who has fallen into Guna Caves has survived.

== Background ==
"It was pitch dark inside and no one knew whether the rope reached him"

— Report on the incident, 2006 (Note: The Hindu news report inaccurately labeled the photo by switching the order of Siju David and Subhash Chandran's names.)
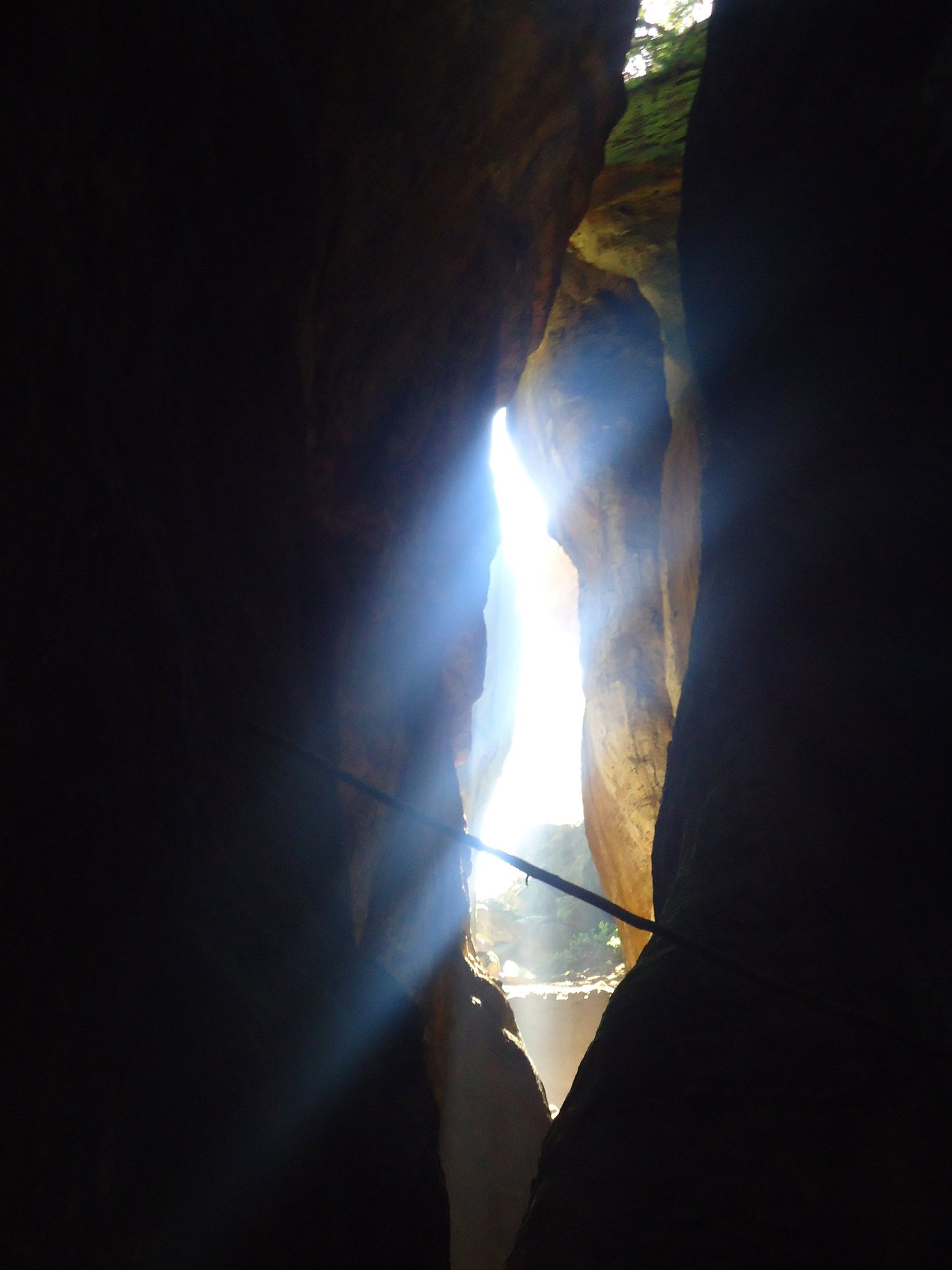
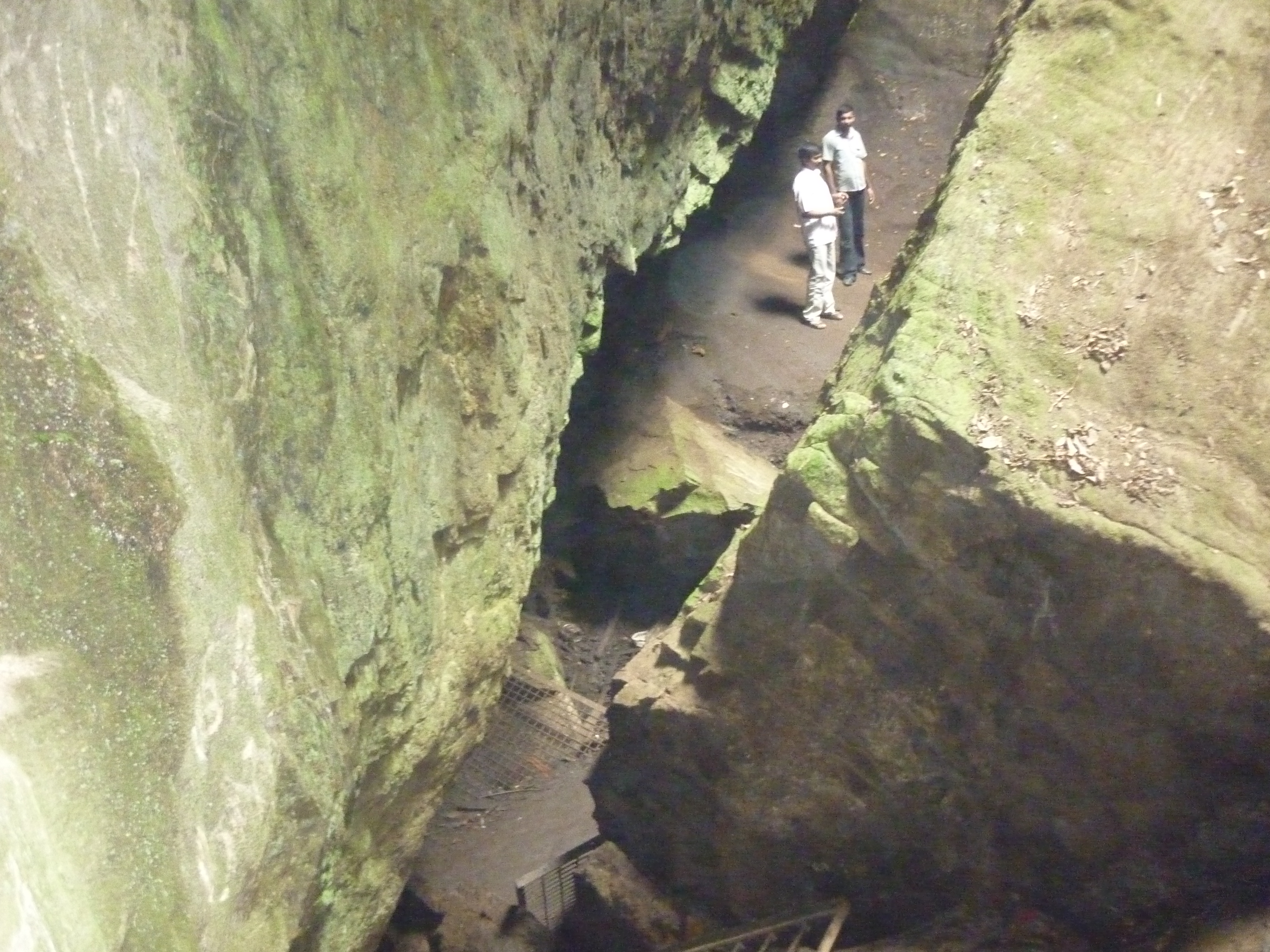
Photos of Guna Cave in different angles

Subhash Chandran who was 19 at the time was from Manjummel, Ernakulam, Kerala and worked as a painter. Subhash, along with Siju David, who is also known as Kuttan, and numerous other childhood friends were part of a club named Darshana. (Note: The Oneindia news report inaccurately had the name Sasi instead of Siju David.) 9 club members went to Kodaikanal to visit Guna Caves. A sign in Tamil indicated that the area was a prohibited area where 13 people had died; however, the group could not read Tamil and proceeded to cross the dilapidated fence.

Subhash, who had wanted to go into the 100-foot deep cave, tripped and fell inside. His friend Abhilash John was the first to notice his fall and informed the rest of the friend group. When the friend group made contact with locals they were advised to leave to avoid trouble. The friends informed the forest department, and faced police brutality before the forest department staff, firemen, and forest officer Thirunavukkarasukmai rushed to rescue Subhash Chandran.

Subhash's friends urged the firemen to go inside as his condition would be known only by going down into the cave but they were afraid to go inside because of the history of the caves. Sixon John, another of the friends, yelled loudly, briefly waking Subhash. After hearing his voice, Kuttan then decided to go inside. With a 50-foot rope and an additional rope tied around his waist, Kuttan slowly climbed down. When the first rope ended, Kuttan turned his torch on but turned it off since he could only see bats. After going down 60 feet, he saw Subhash lying on a rock and shouted up that their friend was alive.

Firefighters rushed in one after the other. Kuttan hugged Subhash tightly to his body and they were slowly pulled up by the firemen. First aid was given to an unconscious Subhash and after almost 5 hours, he was brought back to a conscious state.

== List of Manjummel boys ==
Note: After the success of the film Manjummel Boys, the friend group became popular by that name.

Name	Comments	Actors portrayed	Ref.
Subhash Chandran	the victim of the accident	Character played by Sreenath Bhasi	
Siju David aka Kuttan	the rescuer of Subhash also the eldest person among the boys	Character played by Soubin Shahir	
Abhilash John	He saw Subhash fall into the pit, became traumatized and disassociated himself from the group for a period.	Character played by Chandu Salim Kumar	
Sixon John	He worked in a metal manufacturing unit and gained a habit of having a loud voice. Also younger brother of Siju John	Character played by Balu Varghese	
Krishnakumar M.	While swimming as a kid, he got stuck in a current and was saved by Siju David.	Character played by Ganapathi S. Poduval	
Prasad P. S.	The driver. He revisited Kodaikanal in 2009 and recalled how the locals still remembered the incident.	Character played by Khalid Rahman	
Sumesh U. S.	He did not go on the trip, but he helped his friends financially for the return trip from Kodaikanal and for Subhash's treatment.	Character not in the film	
Sujith U. S.		Character played by Arun Kurian	
Anil Joseph		Character played by Abhiram Radhakrishnan	
Siju John		Character played by Lal Jr.	
Sudheesh		Character played by Deepak Parambol	
Jinson		Character played by Vishnu Reghu	

== Aftermath ==
Subhash Chandran, Siju David, and their friends were charged with entering a prohibited area and had to pay a fine of ₹2,500. After the incident, the director of a fire safety technology institute in Kerala offered to enroll Kuttan in a free course and sponsor his higher studies. The friend group was withheld in Kodaikanal, and they were only able to safely leave without legal hassles after the intervention of the doctor who treated Chandran.

The Dindigul Collector has spoken about erecting a fence and safety grills at Guna Caves to ensure safety in the future.

It took six months for Subhash Chandran to recover from the incident and he spent sixty days in an ayurvedic hospital.

In 2008, Siju David received a bravery award from President Pratibha Patil.

== Movie depiction ==
Many directors met with the boys in order make a film based on the incident but they were called off due to high expenses.

In 2023, director Chidambaram met with the group and finalised a project based on this incident under the title Manjummel Boys, and the movie was released in theatres in 2024 and became the fourth highest grossing Malayalam movie ever as of November 2026, being the highest ever grossing film at the time of its release . The film grossed more than 200 crore at the box office and received praise even in Tamil Nadu.
