= Manjummel Boys =

2024 Indian Malayalam-language film

- Theatrical release poster
- Directed by: Chidambaram
- Written by: Chidambaram
- Based on: Guna Caves rescue
- Produced by: Soubin Shahir; Babu Shahir; Shawn Antony
- Starring: Soubin Shahir; Sreenath Bhasi; Deepak Parambol; Balu Varghese; Ganapathi S. Poduval; Lal Jr. Abhiram Radhakrishnan; Arun Kurian; Khalid Rahman; Chandu Salim Kumar; Shebin Benson; Vishnu Reghu
- Cinematography: Shyju Khalid
- Edited by: Vivek Harshan
- Music by: Sushin Shyam
- Production company: Parava Films
- Distributed by: Sree Gokulam Movies
- Release date: 22 February 2024
- Running time: 135 minutes
- Country: India
- Language: Malayalam
- Budget: ₹20 crore
- Box office: ₹242.3 crore

Manjummel Boys is a 2024 Indian Malayalam-language survival thriller film written and directed by Chidambaram. It is produced by Soubin Shahir, Babu Shahir and Shawn Antony under Parava Films. The film stars an ensemble cast, which includes Soubin Shahir, Sreenath Bhasi, Deepak Parambol, Balu Varghese, Ganapathi S. Poduval, Lal Jr., Abhiram Radhakrishnan, Arun Kurian, Khalid Rahman and Shebin Benson. Based on a real-life incident that happened in Guna Caves in 2006, the film follows a group of friends from a small locality called Manjummel near Kochi, who decide to have a vacation in Kodaikanal, which is affected when one of them becomes trapped in the Guna Caves.

The film was officially announced in January 2023. Principal photography commenced the same month and wrapped by mid-July. It was shot across Kodaikanal, Palani, Ernakulam, Kochi and Perumbavoor with some parts of the film also being shot at Guna Cave itself. The film has music composed by Sushin Shyam, cinematography by Shyju Khalid and editing by Vivek Harshan.

Manjummel Boys was released worldwide on 22 February 2024 in theatres to critical acclaim. It emerged as the first film in Malayalam cinema to earn more than ₹200 crore, became the highest grossing Malayalam film of all time overtaking 2018 (2023) until it was surpassed by L2: Empuraan (2025). It is currently one of the highest grossing Malayalam film of all time. Manjummel Boys has won 10 awards, including Best Film, Best Director and Best Screenplay at 55th Kerala State Film Awards. It is the highest number of awards ever won by a film in the Kerala State Film Awards.

== Plot ==
In 2006, during the Onam vacation, a group of ten friends from an arts club in Kochi travel to Kodaikanal, Tamil Nadu, for a holiday. Before heading back, one of the friends, Sudhi, suggests visiting the Guna Caves, the filming location of the movie Gunaa. Under the influence of alcohol, the group ignores the explicit warnings of a local tourist guide, Dominic, and slips past the fences into a restricted zone of the cave system. After etching their group moniker, "Manjummel Boys," onto a rock wall, they gather for a group photograph. As he walks toward the group, Subhash steps onto unstable ground and suddenly plunges into a deep fissure.

Though his friends initially assume he is playing a prank, they quickly panic when he fails to respond to their shouts. A few members race down to the local village to seek help. The locals inform them that the forbidden area is known as "The Devil's Kitchen"—a treacherous chasm over 900 feet deep where thirteen people have previously fallen, with zero bodies ever recovered. The friends rush to the local police station, but the hostile officers beat them and threaten to file a First Information Report (FIR) under the suspicion that the boys murdered Subhash and fabricated the accident to cover up the crime. Meanwhile, heavy rainfall begins, threatening to flood the subterranean cavern.

Fearing public backlash if they completely abandon the tourists, the police reluctantly dispatch a lone officer to inspect the site. En route, the officer notes that a decade prior, even a massive, multi-departmental military operation failed to retrieve the nephew of a former Central Minister from the very same hole. After peering into the dark chasm, the officer concludes that Subhash is dead and advises the group to leave. However, another friend, Sixon, manages to hear a faint cry echoing from the depths, proving Subhash is still alive.

The police call in the fire department, and officials estimate Subhash is trapped around 120 feet below the surface. The rescue teams attempt to lower a rope, but they recognize that Subhash is likely too injured or disoriented to grab it himself. Fearing low oxygen levels and structural collapses, the officers refuse to descend into the pit. Driven by desperation, one of the friends, Siju David (Kuttan), volunteers to be lowered into the abyss. Though the authorities hesitate, the combined insistence of the friends and the gathered locals forces them to comply.

Kuttan is strapped into a harness and lowered into the dark chasm. As the initial length of rope runs out, the police urge him to return, fearing asphyxiation. Kuttan refuses to abandon his friend and demands more rope. Upon reaching a depth of 120 feet, he discovers a heavily bleeding, semi-conscious Subhash trapped on a narrow, mud-slicked ledge. Kuttan manages to secure Subhash to his harness, and the rescue teams pull both men back to the surface.

Subhash receives immediate first aid at a local clinic before the group transports him back to a hospital in their hometown. The Tamil Nadu Police agree to let the group depart without filing charges, warning them never to return. To avoid familial panic, the friends agree to keep the true nature of the accident a secret, telling Subhash’s family that his injuries were caused by a fall at a waterfall. Subhash initially suffers from severe post-traumatic nightmares and insomnia, but gradually recovers after undergoing professional trauma therapy. Sometime later, a traveler returning from Tamil Nadu exposes the true story of the miraculous rescue to the local community, turning Kuttan into a celebrated hero. Two years later, Kuttan is officially awarded the Jeevan Raksha Padak by the government for his extraordinary bravery.

== Cast ==
- Soubin Shahir as Siju David aka "Kuttan"
  - Kevin as Young Kuttan
- Sreenath Bhasi as Subhash Chandran
  - Dilan Derin George as ten-year-old Subhash
    - Dian Derin George as five-year-old Subhash
- Deepak Parambol as Sudhi
  - Divakaran as Young Sudhi
- Balu Varghese as Sixon John
- Ganapathi as Krishnakumar aka "Kichan"
  - Sathvik as Young Kichan
- Lal Jr. as Siju John, Sixon's brother
- Abhiram Radhakrishnan as Anil
- Arun Kurian as Sujith
- Chandu Salim Kumar as Abhilash John
- Vishnu Reghu as Jinson
  - Arun as Young Jinson
- Khalid Rahman as Prasad, taxi driver
- Rini .K. Rajan as Subash's mother
- Pooja Mohanraj as studio girl
- Shebin Benson as Mejo
- George Maryan as Arumugam, a local seller
- Kathiresan as Head constable
- Ramachandran Durairaj as Dominic, a local guide
- Vijay Gaura as Rathnavel, a local tourist photographer
- Vijay Muthu as Sub-Inspector
- Karthika Vellathery as bride
- Mani as Forest range officer
- Sasikumar as Police officer
The real Manjummel Boys made a cameo appearance as the opposing gang during the tug of war contest.

== Production ==
=== Development ===
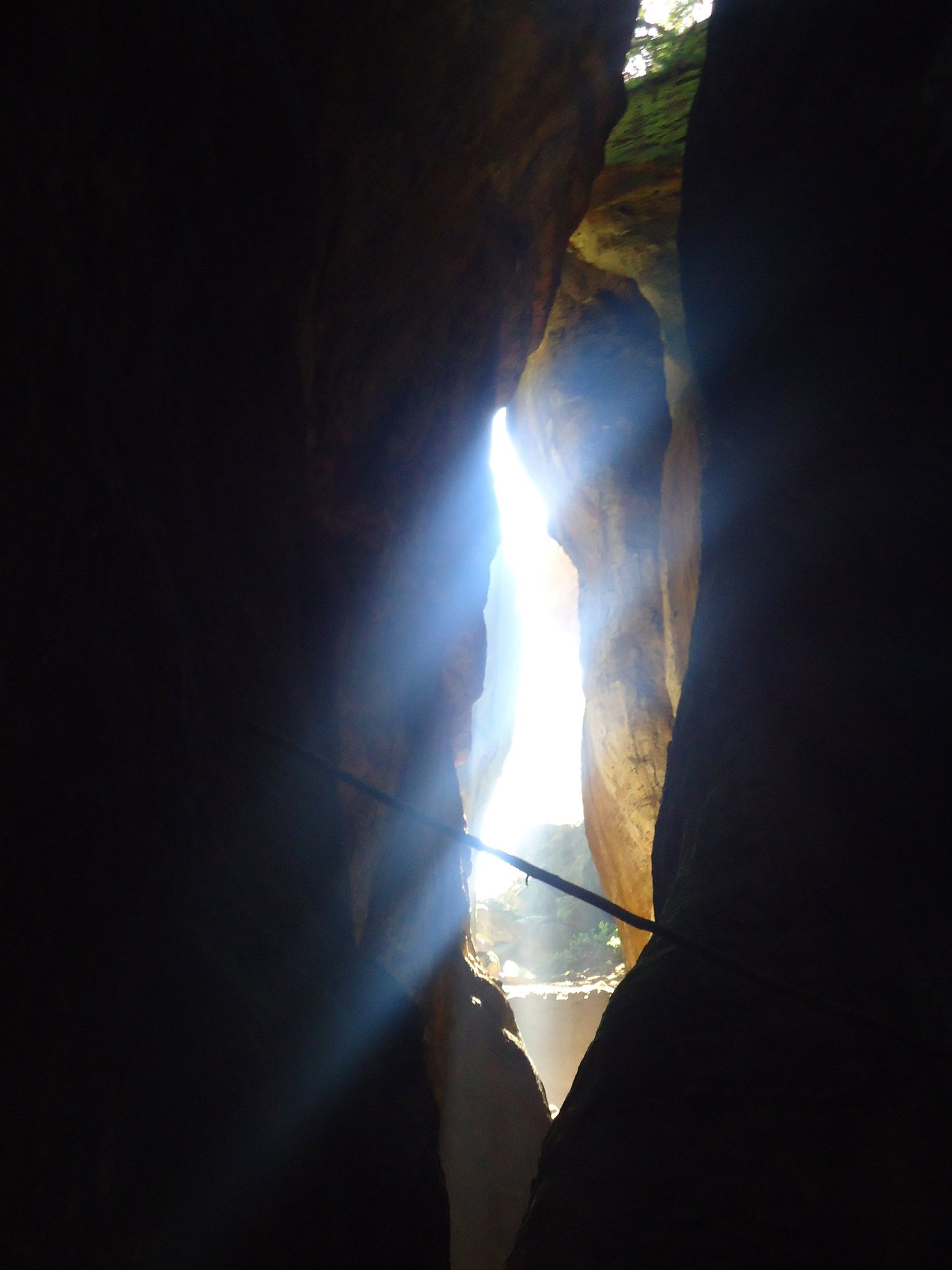
Guna Caves rescue incident served as the inspiration for the film

Inspiration for the film came to Chidambaram after hearing a real-life story told to him by his friend Shawn Antony where a group of boys from Kochi who went for a trip to Kodaikanal and while visiting Guna Caves, one of them fell down a hole to a depth of 120 feet. As rescue officials hesitated to descend, one of the boys climbed down a rope to save him. This prompted Chidambaram to consider for a potential film material. He visited the boys in Kochi. After listening to their accounts he decided to make a film on the incident. He did extensive research to recreate the original sequence of events. Following his visit to Guna Caves he visualised the danger that the boys had experienced and also believed that the location was completely unsuitable for shooting. It took Chidambaram a one and half years to write the script.

The project was initially reported in January 2023 by The New Indian Express, which was the second of Chidambaram after Jan. E. Man (2021). Soubin Shahir and Sreenath Bhasi were roped to play the lead roles, in their fifth collaboration following Parava (2017), Kumbalangi Nights, Virus (2019), and Bheeshma Parvam (2022). Soubin also produced the film with his father Babu Shahir and producer-distributor Shawn Antony under their maiden production house Parava Films. Cinematographer Shyju Khalid, musician Sushin Shyam, editor Vivek Harshan and production designer Ajayan Chalissery were announced as a part of the technical crew. Balu Varghese, Ganapathy, Lal Junior, Deepak Parambol, Abhiram Radhakrishnan, Arun Kurian, Khalid Rahman, Chandu Salimkumar, and Vishnu Raghu were also cast as the main characters in the film. The real-life Manjummel Boys make a cameo appearance as the opposing gang during a tug of war contest.

=== Filming ===
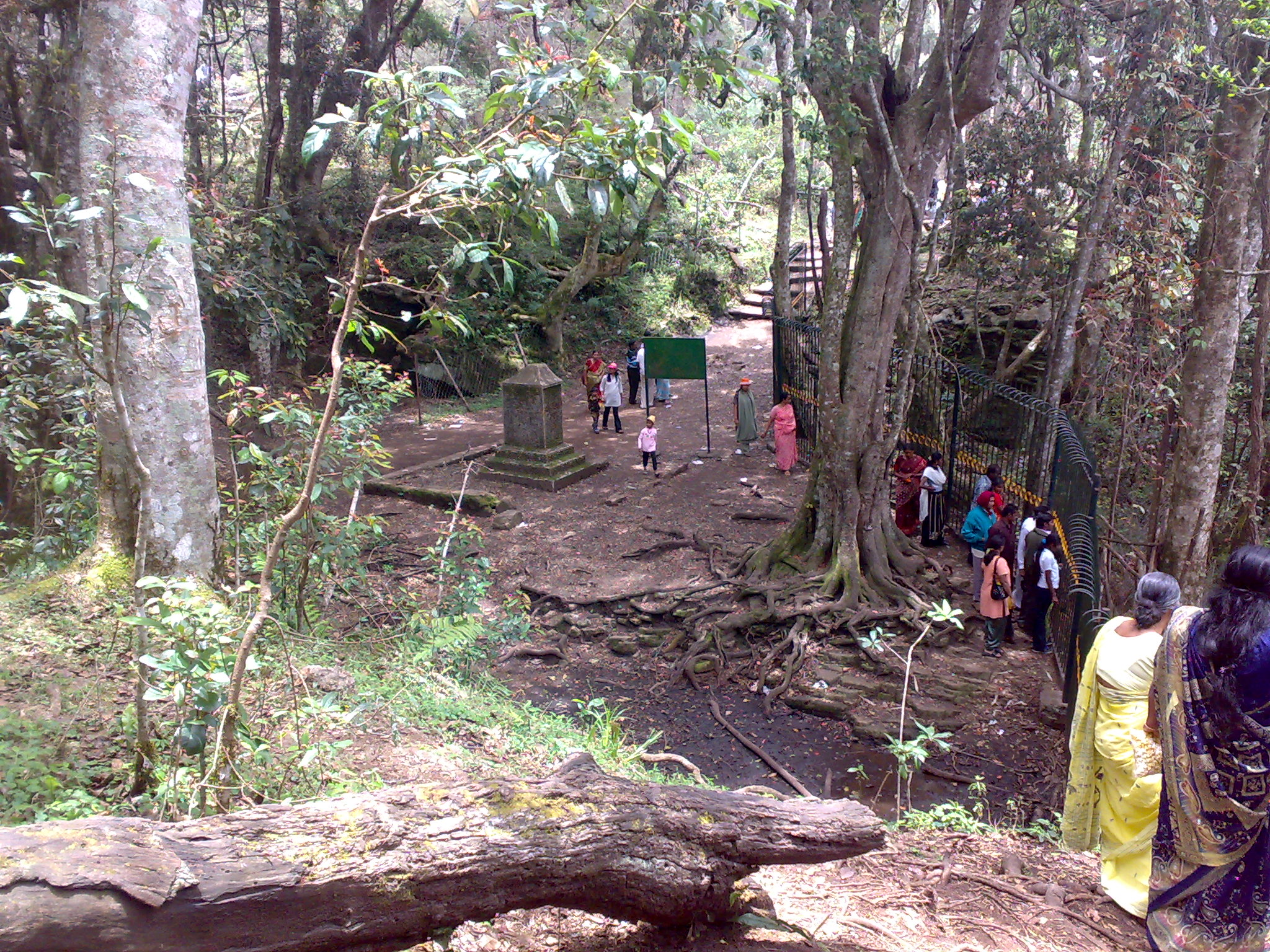
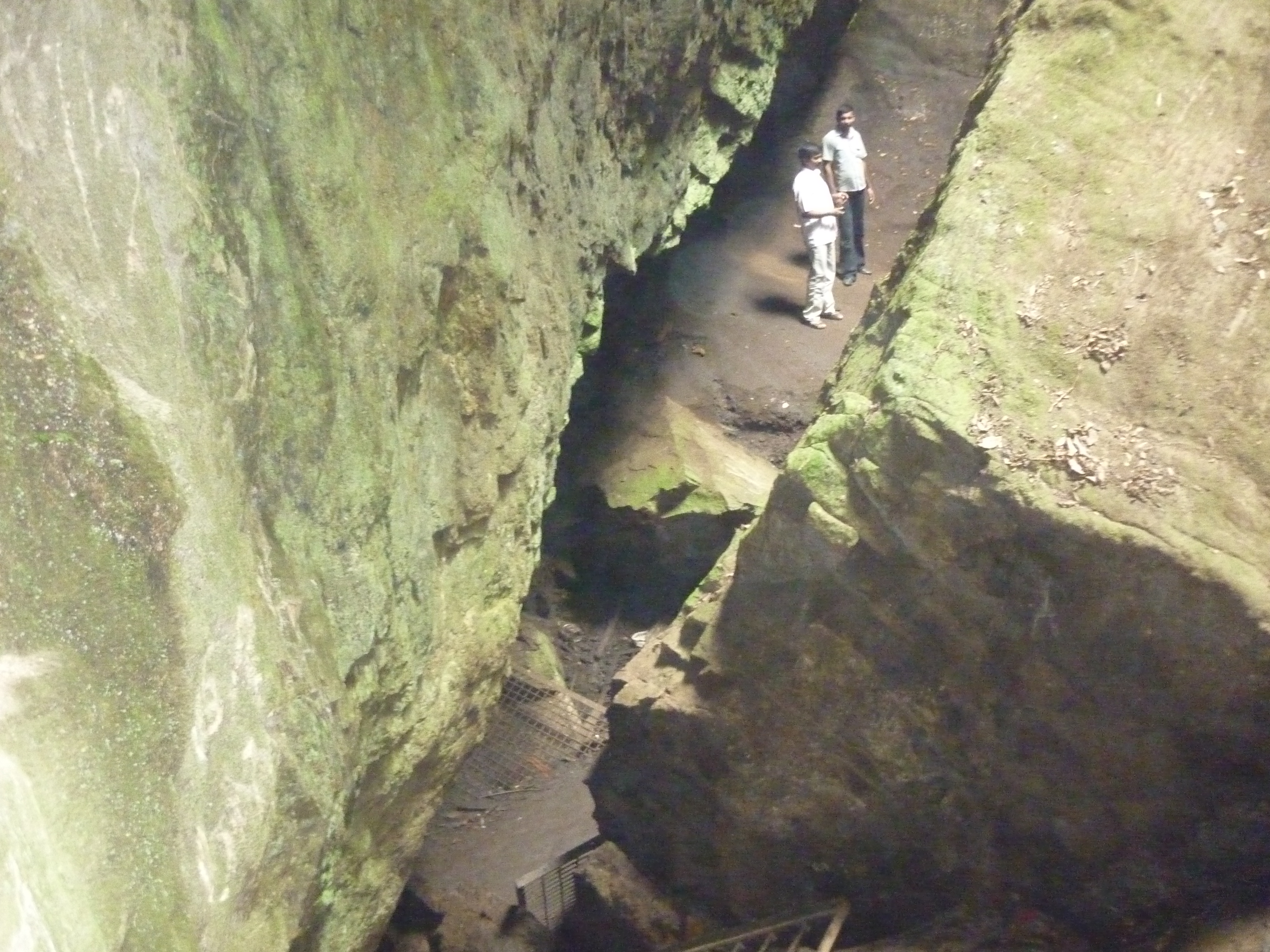
Although the film was shot at a production studio some parts of the film was shot at the real Guna Cave Itself. Interior view (right) and exterior view (left)

Principal photography commenced at Kodaikanal on 26 January 2023 and concluded on 17 July. The film was shot around 101 working days throughout multiple schedules. The film was also shot in Palani, Ernakulam and Kochi. The cave and its surrounding shown in the film was an actual set constructed in an abandoned godown in Perumbavoor by production designer Ajayan Chalissery.

About 90 percent of the film was shot in a replica of the cave. Realising the dangerous prospect in shooting in Guna caves which was thought to be impractical, they took the measurements and built a similar cave at a warehouse in Perumbavoor. Metal and fibre were used for the frame and the rocks. The height was about 40 feet and additional VFX was done to create further height. It was validated by two senior technicians who commented that the recreation was authentic and looked like real Guna caves. The technicians were part of the crew of Kamal Haasan’s 1991 film Gunaa, which was shot inside the caves.

== Music ==
The original score and soundtrack of Manjummel Boys is composed by Sushin Shyam. It features two tracks, which were sung by Pradeep Kumar and rapper Vedan. The lyrics were penned by Anwar Ali and Vedan. In the film, the 1991 Tamil film Gunaa is referenced several times, especially through the song "Kanmani Anbodu Kadhalan". The film won the Best Music Award at the Kino Bravo International Film Festival in Sochi, Russia. The film was the only Indian film in the festival's competitive section.

== Release ==
=== Theatrical ===
Manjummel Boys was theatrically released on 22 February 2024. Prior to the film's theatrical release, the Film Exhibitors Union Organisation of Kerala (FEUOK) announced that they would halt the screening of Malayalam-language films in theatres owing to the Kerala Film Producers Association (KFPA) and Film Distributors Association's decision not to screen films that would be released in streaming platforms in less than 42 days. FEUOK went on with the theatre strike from 23 February 2024 and Malayalam films were stopped from releasing in theatres till 2 March 2024. Eventually, KFPA affirmed on the film's release in specific theatres which followed the contractual agreements. Prior to the film's release, it garnered ₹1.47 crore (US$160,000) from advance bookings across Kerala. The Telugu-language dubbed version was released on 6 April 2024.

=== Distribution ===
It was released by Sree Gokulam Movies through Dream Big Films in Kerala and Tamil Nadu. The overseas rights acquired by Phars Film Co. It was distributed across Andhra Pradesh and Telangana by Mythri Movie Makers, Sukumar Writings and Primeshow Entertainment.

=== Home media ===
The streaming rights and satellite rights were acquired by Disney+ Hotstar and Asianet, respectively. The film began streaming on Disney+ Hotstar from 5 May 2024 in Malayalam and dubbed versions of Tamil, Telugu, Kannada and Hindi languages.

== Reception ==
=== Box office ===
Manjummel Boys grossed ₹72.1 crore (US$7.7 million) in Kerala and ₹170.2 crore (US$18 million) in Rest of India (with a majority in Tamil Nadu–₹64.10 crore) and overseas territories (₹73.3 crore) for a worldwide total of ₹242.3 crore (US$26 million). It remains as the highest grossing Malayalam film in Rest of India.

On the opening day of its release, the film earned a gross collection of ₹5.5 crore (US$590,000) as per early estimates and ₹6.9 crore (US$740,000) as per revised reports by trade experts. On its second day the film garnered ₹8.1 crore (US$870,000) to a worldwide gross of ₹15 crore (US$1.6 million). It grossed over ₹26 crore (US$2.8 million) worldwide by its third day. The film earned ₹35 crore (US$3.7 million) worldwide within the first four-day weekend of its release. The film grossed ₹19 crore (US$2.0 million) from overseas giving it a worldwide gross of ₹41 crore (US$4.4 million) in 5 days. In eight days, the film grossed ₹55 crore (US$5.9 million) at the worldwide box office, earning ₹32 crore (US$3.4 million) domestically and ₹23 crore (US$2.5 million) from the overseas. By 5 March 2024, the film crossed ₹100 crore. By 14 March 2024, the film crossed ₹175 crore. As of 19 March 2024, Manjummel Boys has grossed a worldwide total of ₹200 crore (US$25 million).

==== Tamil Nadu ====
In Tamil Nadu, the film garnered ₹1 crore (US$110,000) at the box office in the first weekend. Within eleven days, the film earned ₹15 crore (US$1.6 million), thereby becoming the highest-grossing Malayalam film in the state. Film analysts and exhibitors attributed the success of the film which was primarily attributed to 60% of the film being set in Tamil Nadu which connected with the local audiences, along with the nostalgia, themes and emotional connect with family audience and youngsters, and popular references to Tamil cinema, primilarily Gunaa, which was shot in the Gunaa caves. Exhibitors further described that the lack of notable Tamil films and the releases during February and March 2024 not performing well as expected were the contributing factors for the film's overperformance in the state.

=== Critical response ===
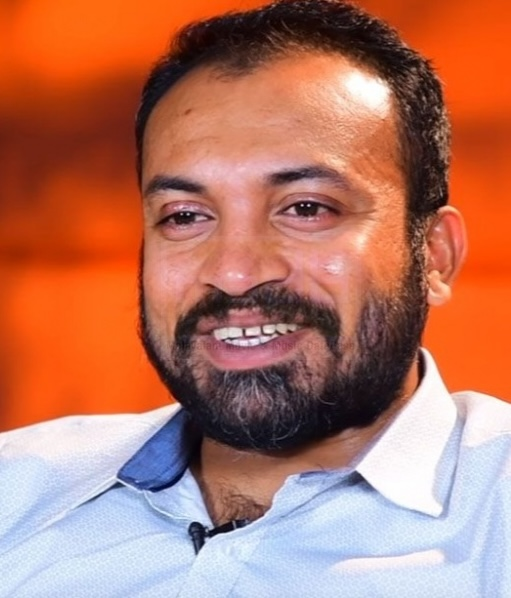
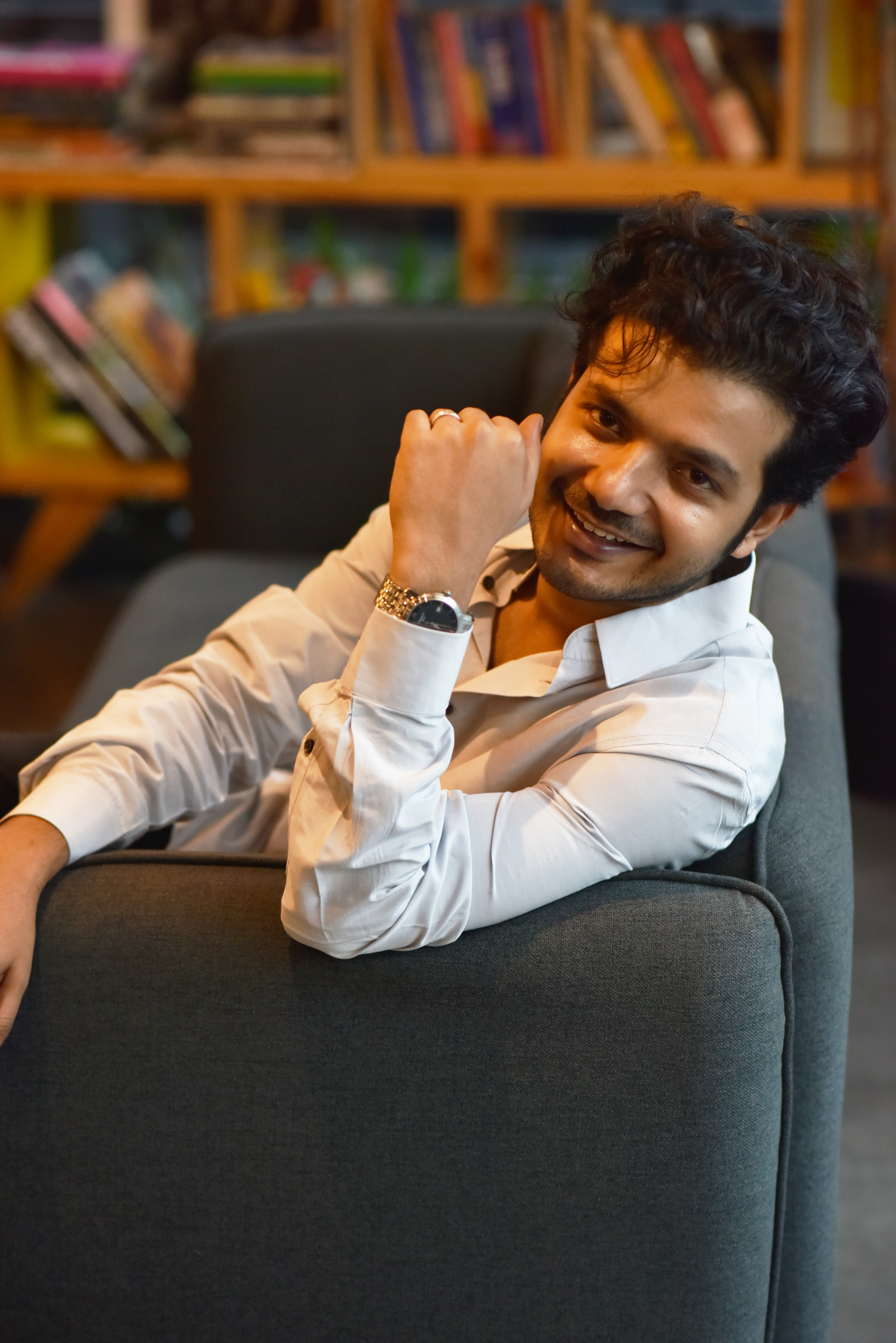
Soubin Shahir and Sreenath Bhasi were appreciated for their roles as Kuttan and Subhash, respectively.

Manjummel Boys received critical acclaim from critics.

S. Devasankar of Pinkvilla gave 4/5 stars and wrote "Manjummel Boys is one of the finest additions to Malayalam survival thriller films. The film demands a theater watch with the best sound quality for the best experience, and is sure to leave the audience shook". Gopika I. S. of The Times of India gave 4/5 stars and wrote "Manjummel Boys isn't your average friendship flick packed like a survival film. If you are looking for a crisp survival film, this is it. It's an absolute marvel of visuals, absolutely good writing, characterisation, editing, acting and all the thrills".

Arjun Menon of Rediff gave 4/5 stars and wrote "Manjummel Boys gets so many things right that the small nitpicks don't amount to much in the larger picture". Sanjith Sridharan of OTTplay gave 3 1/2 / 5 stars and wrote "Chidambaram hasn't tried to overdramatise Manjummel Boys for the sake of entertainment and has kept it mostly true to the events that had transpired in Kodaikanal in 2006".

Anandu Suresh of The Indian Express gave 3/5 stars and wrote "Despite its shortcomings, Chidambaram's film can indeed be seen as a powerful tribute to the real Manjummel Boys and their determined efforts to save their dear one". Janani K. of India Today gave 3/5 stars and wrote "Director Chidambaram's Manjummel Boys is a heartwarming thriller which is earnest in its attempt".

S. R. Praveen of The Hindu wrote "Though the survival thriller part brings back memories of Bharathan's Malootty, this one takes a different path by tying the events closely to their friendship of the characters". Princy Alexander of Onmanorama wrote "Overall, the movie is a neatly crafted tale of friendship that triumphs over the survival drama".

== Accolades ==
Year	Award	Ceremony Date	Category	Recipients	Result	Ref.
2024	KinoBravo Film Festival, Russia	1 October 2024	Best Music	Sushin Shyam	Won	
2024	Mazhavil Entertainment Awards 2024	20 August 2024	Box Office	Manjummel Boys	Won	
2024	Kerala State Film Awards	TBA	Best Film	Manjummel Boys	Won	
2024	Kerala State Film Awards	TBA	Best Director	Chidambaram S. Poduval	Won	
2024	Kerala State Film Awards	TBA	Best Screenplay (Original)	Chidambaram S. Poduval	Won	
2024	Kerala State Film Awards	TBA	Best Character Actor	Soubin Shahir	Won	
2024	Kerala State Film Awards	TBA	Best Cinematography	Shyju Khalid	Won	
2024	Kerala State Film Awards	TBA	Best Art Director	Ajayan Chalissery	Won	
2024	Kerala State Film Awards	TBA	Best Lyricist	Vedan	Won	
2024	Kerala State Film Awards	TBA	Best Sound Mixing	Shijin Melvin Hutton, Fazal A. Backer	Won	
2024	Kerala State Film Awards	TBA	Best Sound Designing	Shijin Melvin Hutton, Abhishek Nair	Won	
2024	Kerala State Film Awards	TBA	Best Laboratory/Colourist	Srik Varier	Won	

== Controversies ==
=== Comments by Jeyamohan ===
Jeyamohan's stated, Manjummel Boys is a disturbing film that depicts reality rather than fiction. He said the tourists from Kerala engage in excessive drinking, vomiting, stumbling, and lack of common sense or social awareness.

=== Forgery and money-laundering accusations ===
The producers of the film were arraigned by the Marad police to inquire about alleged cheating and forgery. FIR was filed against Soubin Shahir, Babu Shahir and Shawn Antony. On 17 May 2024, the Kerala High Court stayed the proceedings for a month based on the petition filed by the Defendant seeking to quash the criminal case.

=== Plagiarism allegation by Ilaiyaraaja ===
On 22 May 2024, music composer Ilaiyaraaja issued a formal notice to the producers of Manjummel Boys for the unauthorised use of his song "Kanmani Anbodu Kadhalan" from Gunaa. The notice, addressed to Soubin Shahir, Babu Shahir, and Shawn Antony of Parava Films, asserts Ilaiyaraaja's legal and moral rights over the song and reserves the right to initiate legal action.

=== Financial fraud ===
The blockbuster Malayalam survival thriller Manjummel Boys, which became the highest-grossing film in the industry’s history, is now at the center of a major financial fraud controversy involving its producers. Despite the film's massive commercial success and critical acclaim, a UAE-based investor alleged he was deceived by the production team - led by Soubin Shahir and others at Parava Films - after investing ₹7 crore with the promise of a 40% profit share, but receiving little to no returns. Investigations led to charges of cheating, breach of trust, and criminal conspiracy.
