= Death of Shenbaga Nadar =

Automobile dealer

Shenbaga Nadar was an automobile dealer, who dealt Ambassador Cars and Bedford trucks. The firm was based out of Madurai. He partnered with P.V.P Valasubramania Nadar, the first Chairman/Founder/Director of Tamilnadu Mercantile Bank (formerly Nadar Bank Limited).

On May 12, 1955, Nadar slipped and fell into a steep precipice near Guna Caves, just outside its entrance near "Pillar Rock". Presumed dead, a reward of 1 crore was announced for the retrieval of his body. On May 13, Nadar's long-time acquaintance Kuppusamy Naidu and one other member of a rescue team retrieved his body from a depth of 600 feet. Nadar is the only person whose body was successfully retrieved from any of the crevices/pits/caverns.

== Death ==
Nadar is said to have vacationed at Kodaikanal yearly during the summer months along with his family and was a regular visitor to the Guna Caves area. On May 12, 1955, he took his two grandchildren to show them the caves and the hillside in his car. At one point, he parked his car and instructed the kids to stay inside the vehicle and proceeded alone to Pillar Rock, with the assurance that he would be back in a few minutes. By the time dusk had settled and the sky darkened at 7pm, he had not returned. The worried grandchildren grew anxious and started crying, which was heard by estate workers who were returning home from their day's work. Upon finding the children, and further investigation at Pillar Rock, the workers found skid marks (it had rained that day) in the wet mud at a crevice near Pillar Rock and concluded that Nadar had likely fallen into the cavern by accident.

== Search and recovery ==
Recovery operations commence ib May 13, first with local recovery experts and later with a crew from Madurai. The cave was notorious for its hidden holes which plunged into deep pits. It was infamous for the fact that anybody who fell in or any animal that fell in was never recovered due to the cavernous passages. In 1955, it was not a restricted area, which led people to explore and encounter accidents. Local crew from nearby areas attempted to retrieve his body, but the difficult nature of the passages, lack of oxygen, and damp air made it impossible even to get to a vantage point. Vision was limited as burning wood was used as torches. After several attempts failed, Nadar's acquaintance Kuppusamy Naidu volunteered to descend down the precipice to look for Nadar. It is said that an entire truckload was rope was used to lower Naidu into the crevice. At approximately 600 feet, Nadar's dead body was located face down and the recovery team successfully retrieved it with the help of another member and a makeshift Stoke's Basket. Kuppusamy Naidu refused the reward in honour of his acquaintanceship with Nadar. Following the recovery of Nadar's body, it was taken to Madurai for a funeral and cremation.

== Legacy ==
Two memorial stones were erected in Nadar's memory, describing this incident.
