= Idiyan Chandhu =

- Theatrical release poster
- Directed by: Sreejith Vijayan
- Written by: Sreejith Vijayan
- Produced by: Shafeek; Subair; Rayees; Vishnu Unnikrishnan; Sreejith Vijayan
- Starring: Vishnu Unnikrishnan; Chandu Salim Kumar; Lalu Alex; Gayatri Arun; Jayashree Sivadhas; Lena
- Cinematography: Vignesh Vasu
- Edited by: V Saajan
- Music by: Songs: Aravind R. Warrier; Minshad Zara; Deepak Dev; Background Score: Deepak Dev
- Production company: Happy Productions
- Distributed by: Phars Film; Yash Raj Films (UK/Europe)
- Release date: 19 July 2024
- Country: India
- Language: Malayalam

Idiyan Chandhu (transl. Puncher Chandhu) is a 2024 Indian Malayalam-language coming-of-age action thriller film written and directed by Sreejith Vijayan featuring Vishnu Unnikrishnan in the title role, along with Chandu Salim Kumar, Jayashree Sivadhas, Gayatri Arun, Lena, Lalu Alex and Johny Antony.

This movie received mixed reviews crossing only 52 lakhs at the box office with a budget of 4 crores.

== Plot ==
A traumatic childhood turns Chandu into a violent young man. However, when his behaviour becomes problematic for his loved ones, he decides to transform himself. How does this change his life?

== Cast ==
- Vishnu Unnikrishnan as Chandu
  - Adish Praveen as young Chandu
- Jayashree Sivadhas as Teena Kunjachan
- Gayatri Arun as Sneha Teacher
- Lena as Indu, Chandu's mother
- Vidhya Vijayakumar as Durga
  - Devika Anoop as young Durga
- Chandu Salim Kumar as Murugan
- Johny Antony as Kunjachan, a karate Trainer and Teena's father
- Lalu Alex as Fr Joseph Mambully, School principal
- Sminu Sijo as Manju
- Biju Sopanam as Surendran, Chandu's uncle
- I. M. Vijayan as Vijayan Mash
- Gopi Krishnan Varma as Thommi Kunjachan
- Ramesh Pisharody as Unmesh Kumar
- Salim Kumar as CI Balan
- Kichu Tellus as Irumbu Vaasu
- Sreejith Ravi as Constable Chandran, Chandu's father
- Krishna Jeev (Fukru) as Teny

== Production ==
The stunt choreography was done by Peter Hein. This film is the comeback of Hein after 5 years into Malayalam film industry after Jack & Daniel (2019). The principal photography was shot at Kothamangalam

== Music ==
Idiyan Chandhu

Soundtrack album by Aravind R. Warrier, Minshad Zara, Deepak Dev
- Released: 2024
- Genre: Feature film soundtrack
- Length: 20:58
- Language: Malayalam
- Label: Think Music
External audio
- Idiyan Chandhu – Jukebox on YouTube

The film's music was composed by Aravind R. Warrier, Minshad Zara, and Deepak Dev.

Track listing
No.	Title	Lyrics	Music	Singer(s)	Length
1.	"Kalam Paattu"	Kuttan, Ambili	Aravind R. Warrier	Kuttan, Ambili	2:31
2.	"Porkalangalil"	Shabareesh Varma	Aravind R. Warrier	Niranj Suresh	3:07
3.	"Nirangalayi"	Shabareesh Varma	Aravind R. Warrier	Vineeth Sreenivasan	3:34
4.	"Paathiyiloru"	Santhosh Varma	Minshad Zara	Haricharan, Minshad Zara	4:12
5.	"Chandhune Tholpikkan Aavoollada"	Engandiyoor Chandrashekaran	Deepak Dev	Dabzee	3:28
6.	"Ganapathi Deva"	Jishnu Pavithran	Aravind R. Warrier	Vivek Ayratt	1:59
7.	"Muruga Muruga"	Jishnu Pavithran	Aravind R. Warrier	Vivek Ayratt	2:07
Total length:					20:58

== Reception ==
A critic from Madhyamam gave the film a positive review. Rohit Panikker of Times Now rated the film two-and-a-half out of five stars and wrote, "Despite its average storytelling and the surfacial set-up, Idiyan Chandhu is a worthwhile watch if you are a fan of high-energy action sequences, because this film, unlike most choreographed action sequences that you may have watched, is a raw high school brawl, and there is absolutely no class or finery to it."
