= Ta-Bitjet =

Ancient Egyptian deity

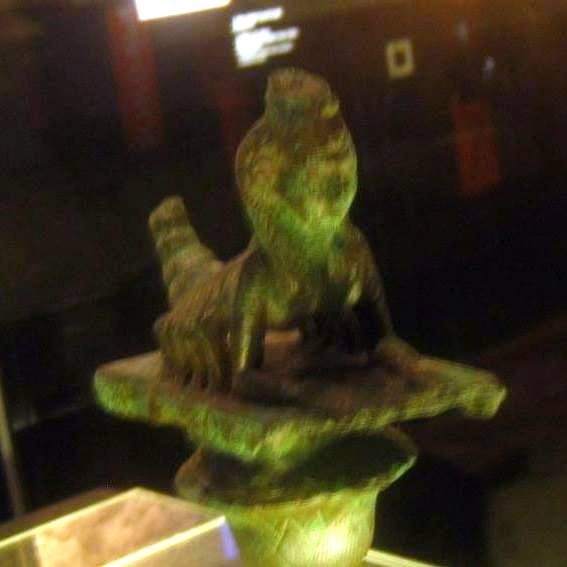
- Statuette of Ta-Bitjet in the Champollion Museum
Name in hieroglyphs
t A b i T t H8 B1

Ta-Bitjet is an ancient goddess of Egyptian mythology. She is identified as the consort of Horus. Ta-Bitjet is a scorpion goddess and the blood that flowed from when Horus ruptured her hymen can serve as a panacea for poisons. She could be associated with another bride of one of Horus, Serket.
