= Kanike =

Sanskrit term

Kanika (Sanskrit: कणिक, romanized: Kaṇika, lit. 'particle') is a Sanskrit and Pali term referring to a particle or a granule. It is often employed in a religious context in Hinduism, to refer to the practice of leaving a morsel of food as Prasadam for a deity, which is deemed to be enough of an offering for their satisfaction.
