= Guna Caves =

Cave in Tamil Nadu, India

- Devil's Kitchen
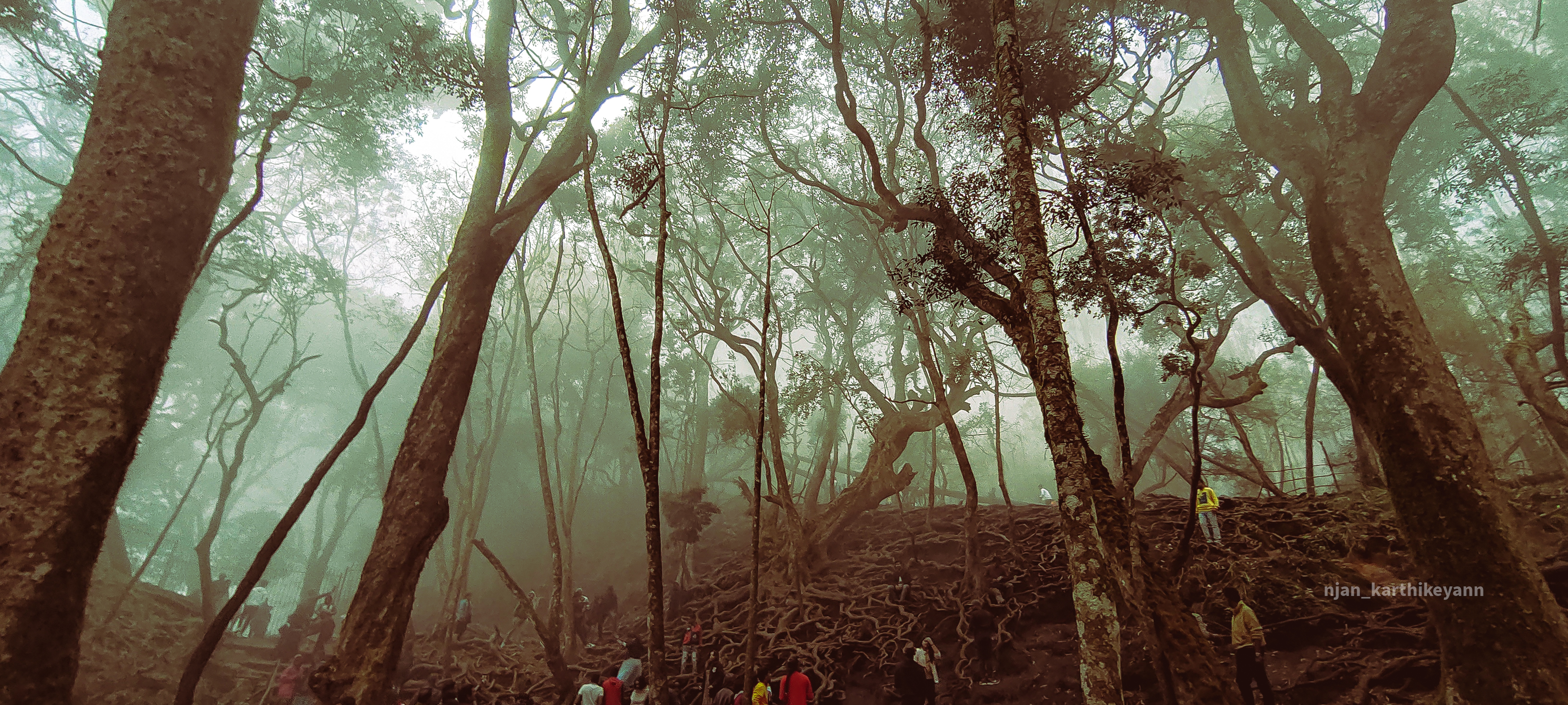

- Location within Tamil Nadu
- Location: Kodaikanal, Dindigul District, Tamil Nadu
- Coordinates: 10.2105°N 77.4614°E
- Discovery: 1821 by B. S. Ward, a British officer
- Access: restricted

Guna Caves, also known as Devil's Kitchen, is a set of cavernous passages and narrow crevices leading to deep and alleged bottomless pits located in Kodaikanal, Dindigul District, Tamil Nadu. It is one of the most prominent attractions for tourists who visit the place. The 1991 Tamil film Gunaa starring Kamal Haasan was filmed here, with this location being pivotal to the background of the film. Hence, the area was subsequently named after the film. The location gained popularity after the film's release which has attracted huge amounts of tourists since. Subsequently, other movies were also shot here, including the climax of the Malayalam film Shikkar (2010), and some shots of the Malayalam film Manjummel Boys (2024).

The caves are infamous for its cavernous architecture involving dark, winding, narrow, and unnavigable passages with little to no sunlight, oxygen and no mapping of their routes. Holes throughout the caverns, some as small as one foot by one foot have been tested by throwing rocks and estimated to have depths of several hundred feet, or sometimes even bottomless based on the reverberation that returns or otherwise. As documented through recent years(post 1991), multiple people have known to have disappeared inside this place without a trace, with almost all attempts ending up futile due to the risky nature involved in the rescue and recovery operations. As of 2016, police have recorded 16 disappearances in connection with the cave without bodies being retrieved. Shenbaga Nadar is the only person whose body has been retrieved successfully post death, and Subash Chandran is the only person who was rescued alive after falling into a crevice inside one of the most dangerous holes in the cave, which on its own has known to have claimed 6 lives. His search and rescue operation serves as the central narrative for the 2024 Malayalam film Manjummel Boys.

== History ==
The caves were allegedly first recorded in 1821 by British officer B.S. Ward, who named it Devil's Kitchen. It was not a prominent location known to many other than the locals. The first recorded tragic incident was in 1955, being the death of Shenbaga Nadar, a Madurai-based automobile dealer and business tycoon who fell into a crevice accidentally and died as a result. The place is also recorded to have had visits from British backpackers in 1988. It still widely remained in obscurity until the late 1980s. In 1991, the caves and surrounding areas were the prime filming locations for Kamal Haasan's 1991 film Gunaa, earning its name thus, and attracting more tourists.

Since then, multiple people have mysteriously disappeared after entering the caves, with authorities being unable to recover their bodies, including that of the nephew of a central minister in 1996. Some of the cases were supposedly suicide, while others were of tourists or locals who went in to explore the cave and fell into dangerous holes inside the caves.

From the early 2000s until 2016, the cave was closed to the public due to increasing numbers of disappearances. However, people continued to ignore the warnings and explore the place. As of police records in 2016, the holes in the cave has caused the death of at least 16 people who attempted to explore the cave.

The only ever successful search and rescue where the victim was saved alive was the 2006 incident of Subhash Chandran, a 20 year old painter from Kerala who fell into a small hole and was stuck several feet down a winding slippery deep cavernous passage. Subhash had come on a trek with his friends when he accidentally fell and was stuck alive. With firefighters and rescue personnel reluctant to risk their lives, one of the friends, Siju David volunteered and successfully saved his friend. The Presidential Award for Bravery was awarded to Siju for this act of selfless courage. This incident formed the central plot of the 2024 Malayalam Film Manjummel Boys.

Following the release of the film and the newly gained popularity, in 2024, the road to the area was reopened to the public. But the entrance to the cave still remains closed for the safety of tourists.

== In popular culture ==
List of films shot at Guna Caves:

Film	Year	Language
Gunaa	1991	Tamil
Shikkar	2010	Malayalam
Manjummel Boys	2024	Malayalam

== Gallery ==
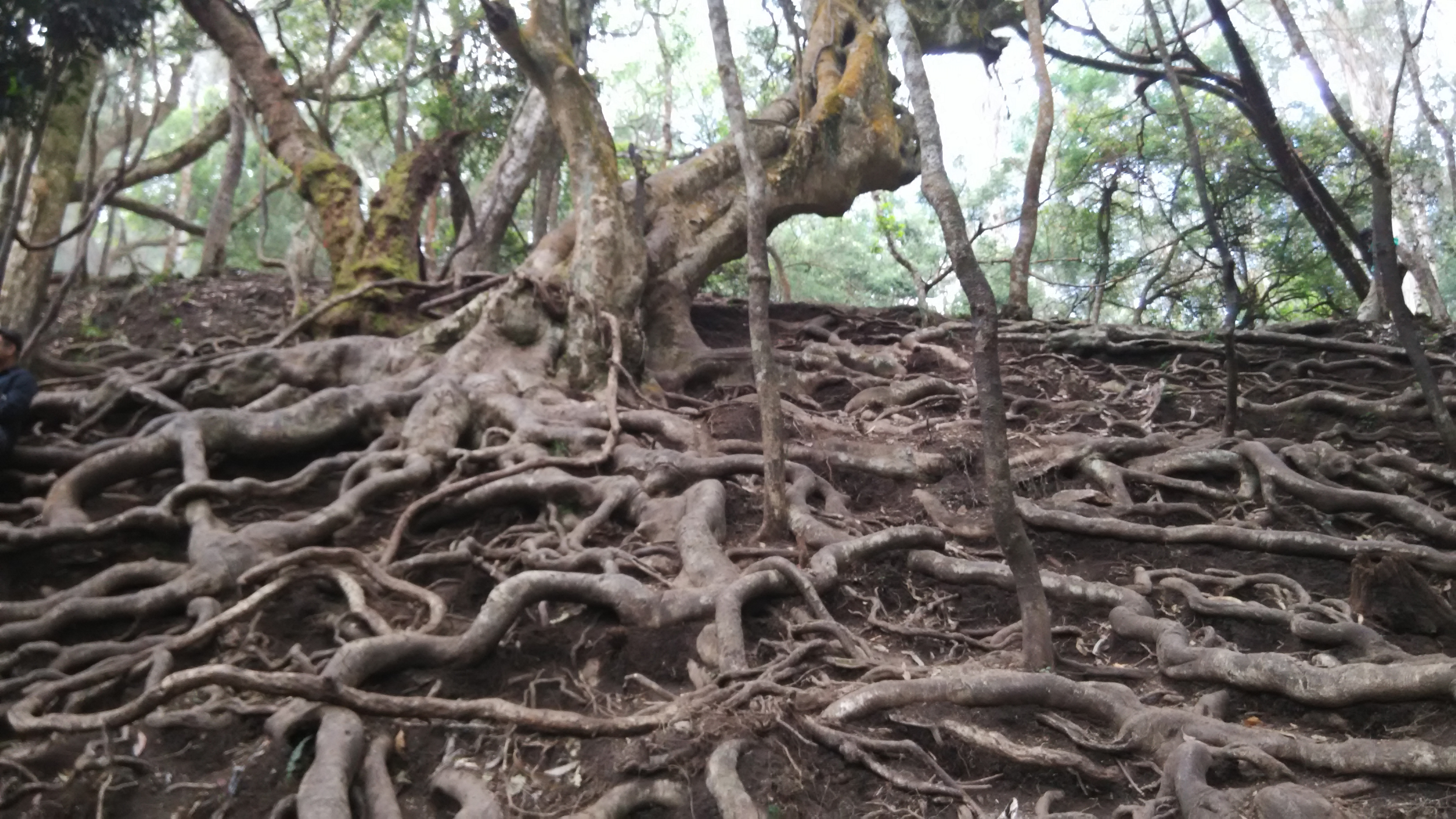
Roots of trees near Guna cave

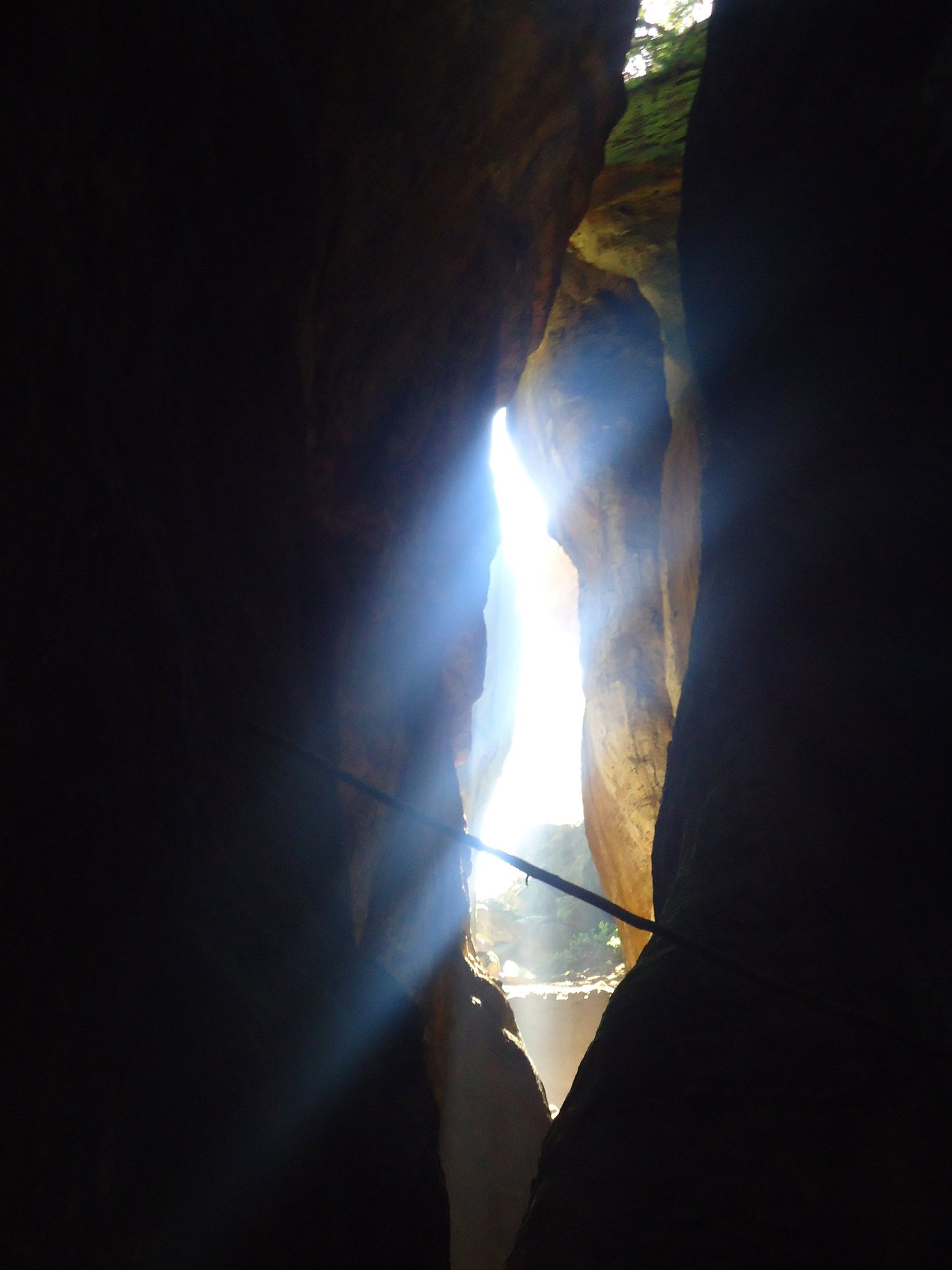
Guna cave Kodaikanal

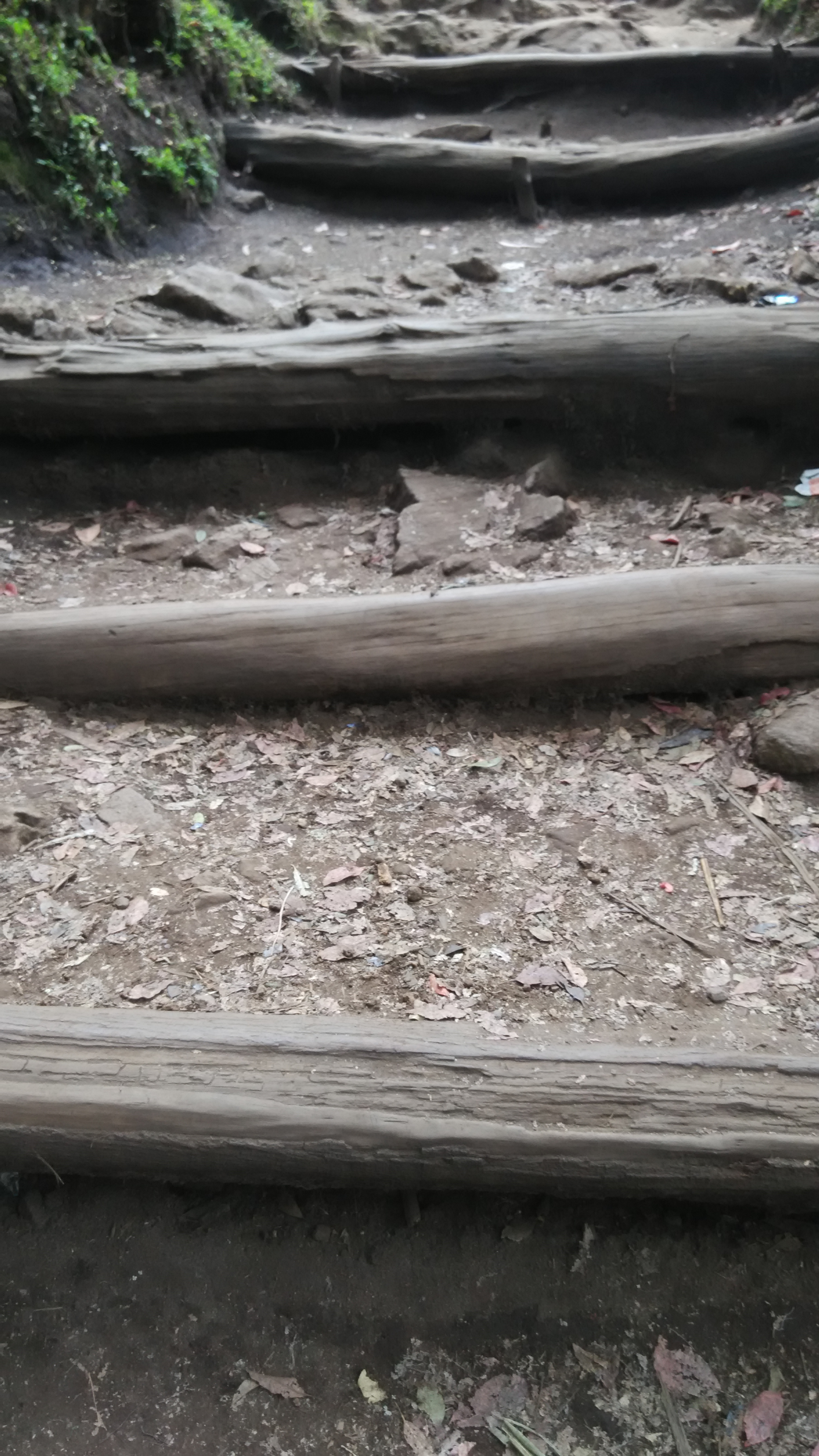
Steps made up of wooden trunks at Guna cave Kodaikanal

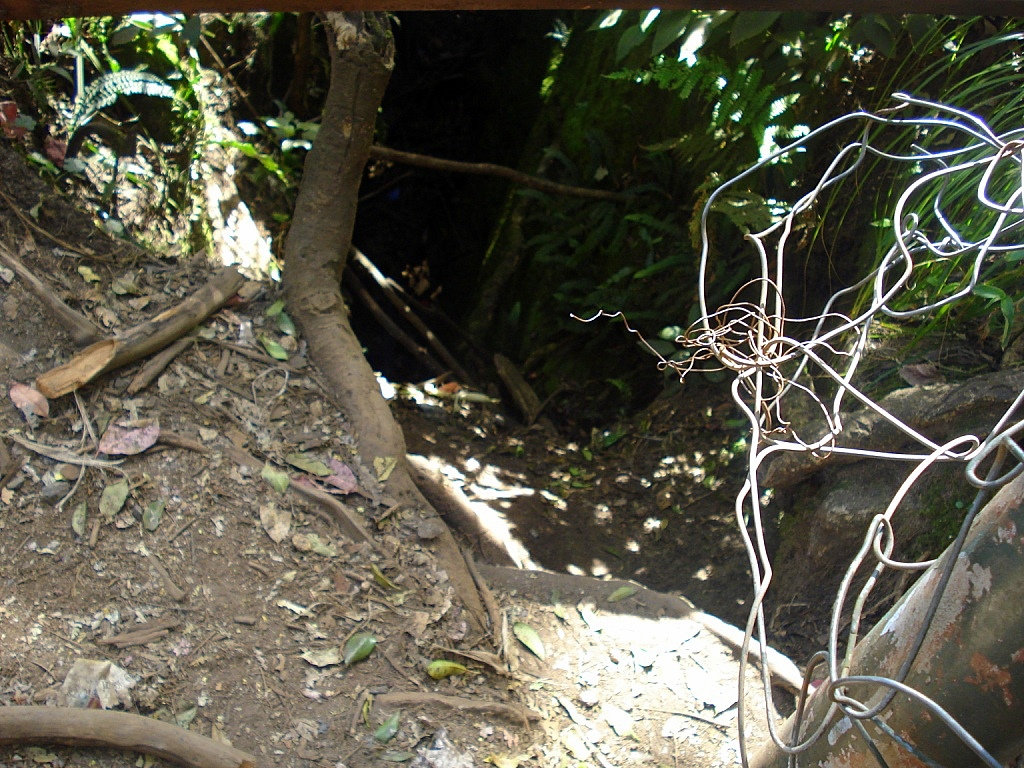
Guna Caves, Kodaikanal

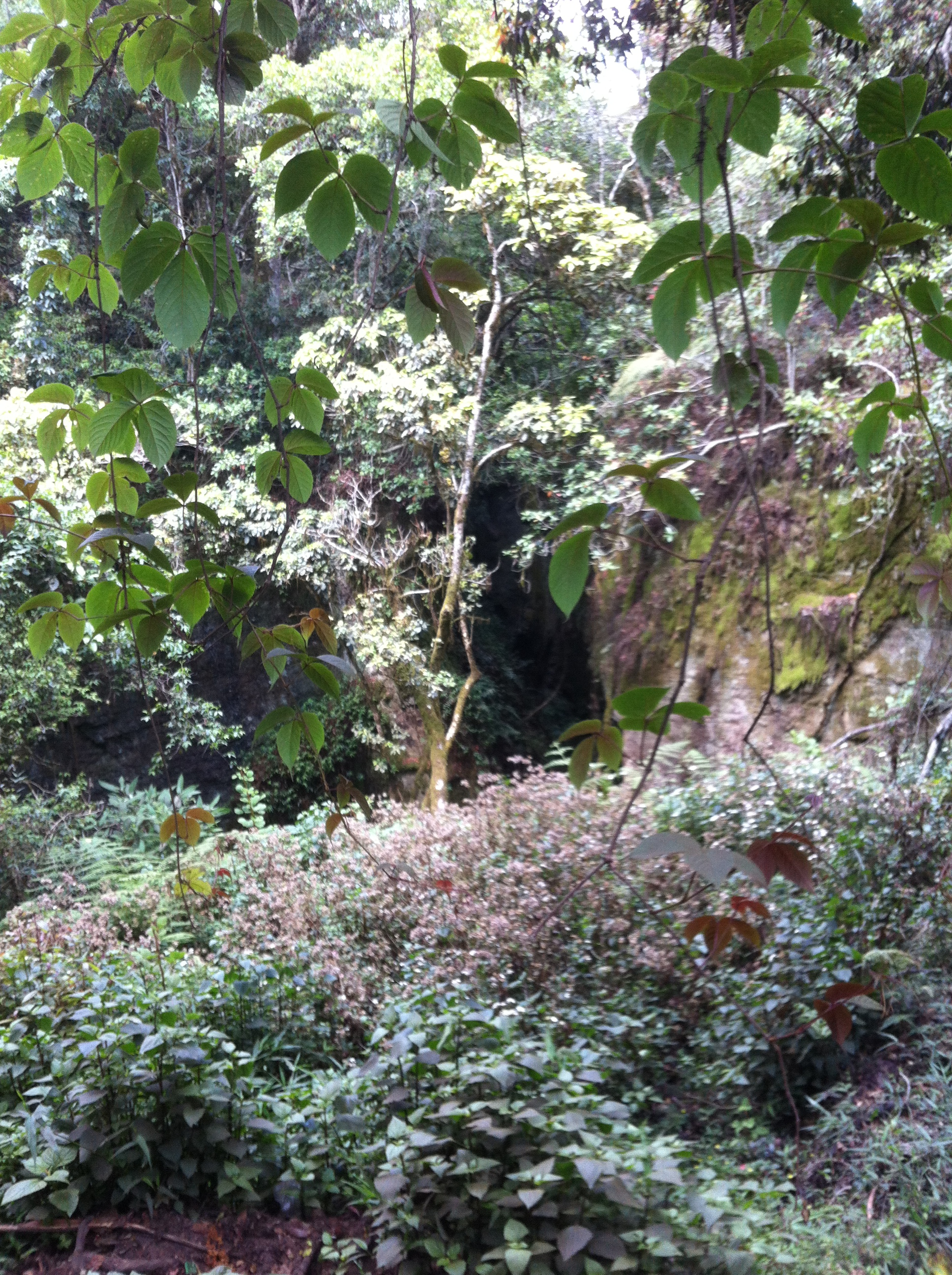
Guna cave, Kodaikanal

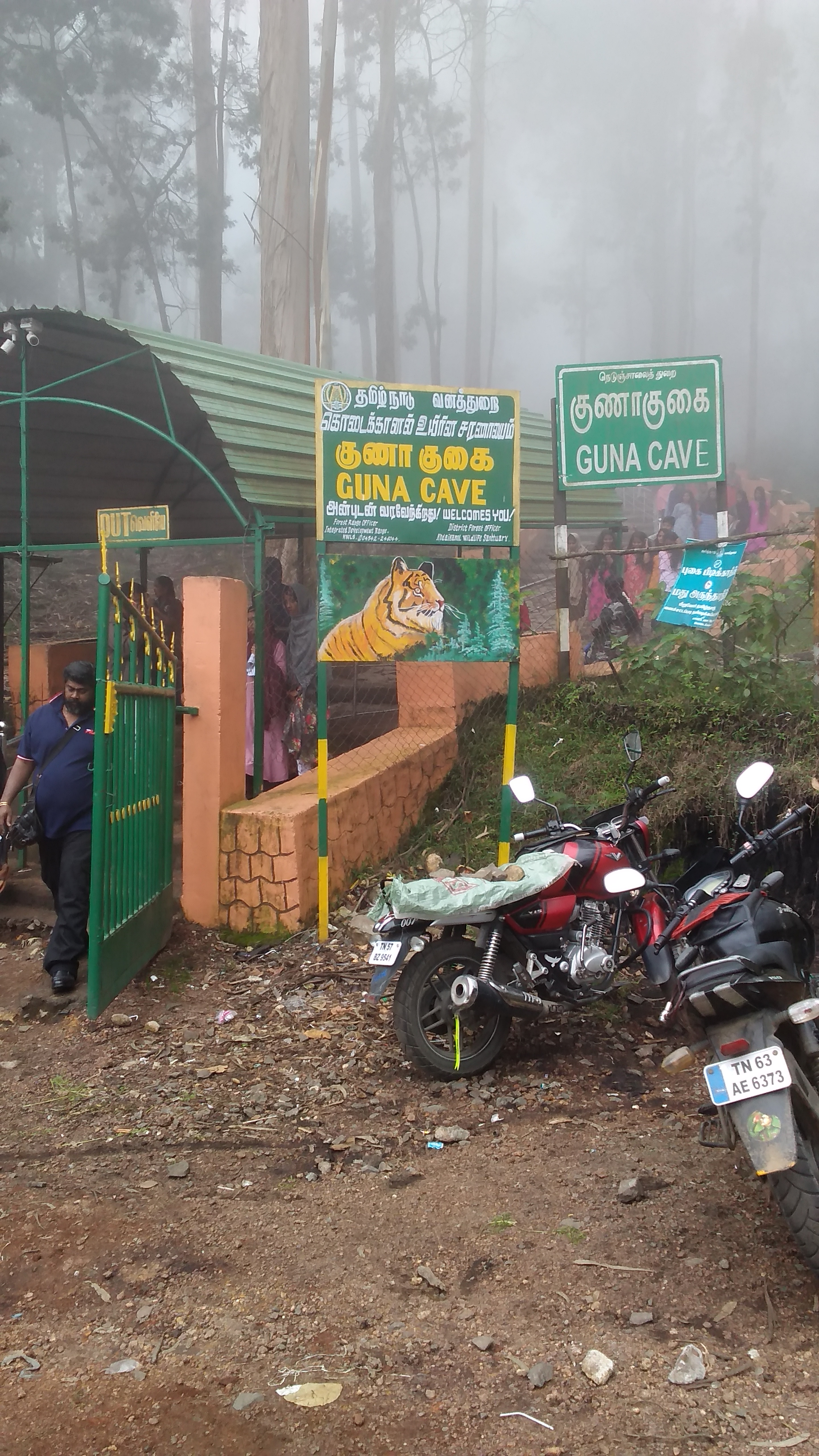
Entrance of Guna cave

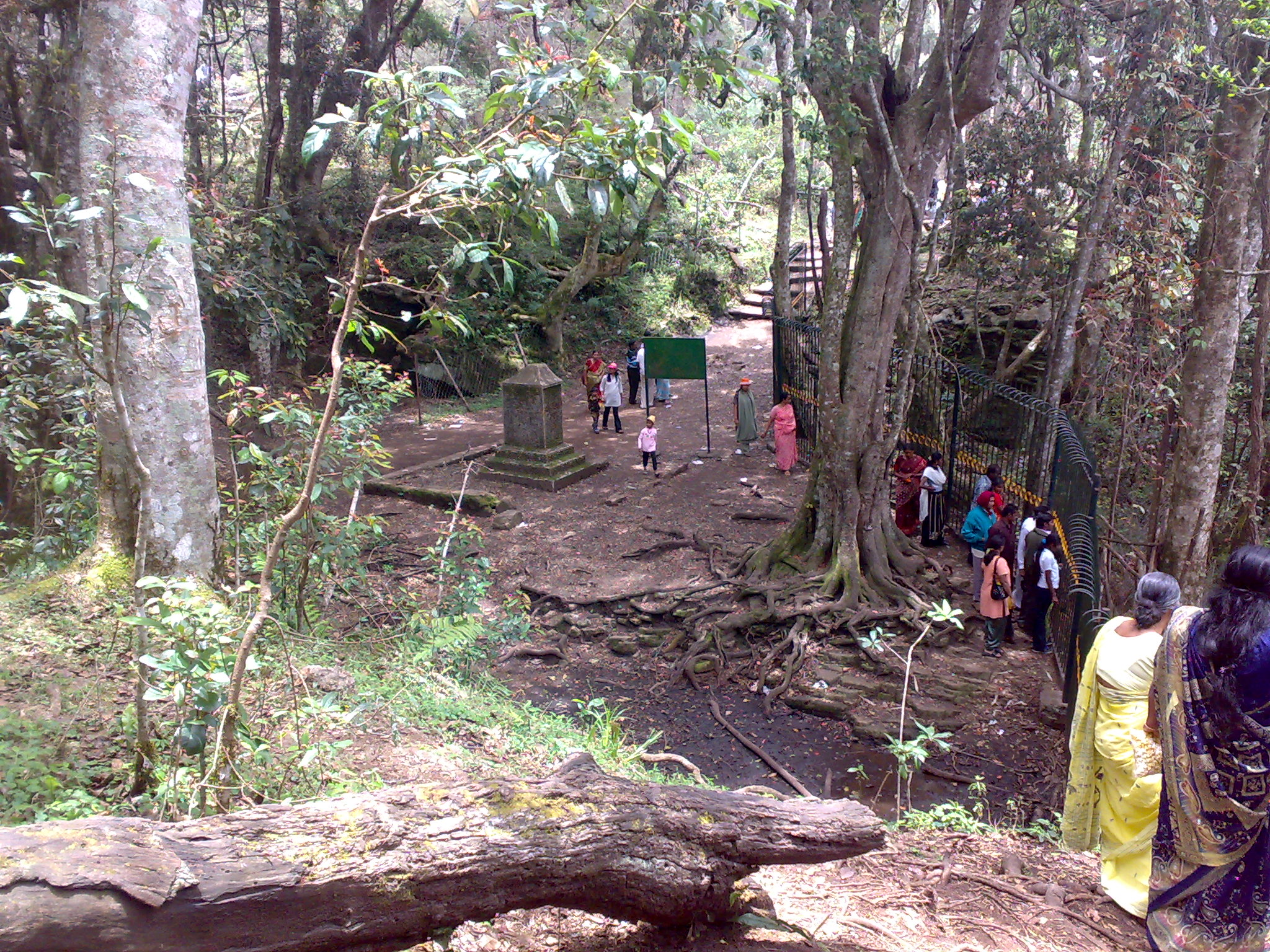
Guna Cave
