= Manjummel =

Town in Kerala, India

- Town
- Location in Kerala, India Manjummel (India)
- Coordinates: 10°5′0″N 76°30′2″E
- Country: India
- State: Kerala
- District: Ernakulam

Languages
  - Official: Malayalam
- Time zone: UTC+5:30 (IST)
- Lok Sabha constituency: Ernakulam

Manjummel is a satellite town of Eloor situated on Periyar River near Kochi, Kerala, India.

== Etymology ==
The name Manjummel came from the Malayalam word Manjumala (transl. snowy mountain). The place used to be uninhabited, and fog covered the hills. The name eventually became Manjummel.

== History ==
Manjummel used to be agriculture based. Cultivated produce was sent to Ernakulam by boat. The locality has since switched to become industrial based. Due to the pollution in the Periyar River, the land became barren and many residents abandoned farming.

There are references to Manjummel dating back to the fifteenth century. A ruler of Travancore reportedly built a fort here to defend against Tippu Sultan’s attacks due to the locality's geography of being mostly surrounded by rivers. The fort was built in a place called Kottakunnu.

== Landmarks ==
Two of the iconic landmarks in Manjummel are the century-old Our Lady of Immaculate Conception Church and St Joseph's Hospital, which was the first mission hospital in Kerala built in 1887.

== Notable people ==
- Edmund Thomas Clint
- Subhash and Siju David
