= Chandu Salim Kumar =

Indian film actor

- Born: North Paravur, Kerala, India
- Occupation: Actor
- Years active: 2009 (child artist); 2021–present
- Father: Salim Kumar

Chandu Salim Kumar is an Indian actor who works in the Malayalam film industry. He is the son of late veteran malayalam actor, writer and filmmaker Salim Kumar. He is known for his role in Manjummel Boys and Lokah Chapter 1: Chandra.

== Career ==
Chandu Salim Kumar hails from Chittattukkara in North Paravur. He made his acting debut as a child artist in the film Love in Singapore (2009). Chandhu, who made his adult debut with the film Malik (2021), made his breakthrough with the role of Abhilash in the 2024 film Manjummel Boys. He then played prominent roles in the films Nadikar, Idiyan Chandhu, Painkili and Lokah Chapter 1: Chandra.

== Filmography ==
Year	Title	Role	Notes
2009	Love in Singapore	Young Shukkoor Khan	Child artist
2021	Malik	Young Moosa	
2024	Manjummel Boys	Abhilash	
2024	Nadikar	Manoj, David's fan	
2024	Idiyan Chandhu	Murugan	
2025	Painkili	Aneesh "Kunjayi"	
2025	Lokah Chapter 1: Chandra	Venu	
2025	Rachel	Joshua	
2026	Mollywood Times	Meljo	
2026	Bachelor Party D'eux	Mammu	
