= Scorpion goddess =

A scorpion goddess is a goddess associated with a scorpion theme.

Examples include:

- Chelamma, a Hindu goddess of the Southern Karnataka region of India
- Hedetet, an Egyptian scorpion goddess
- Išḫara, an Eblaite, Hurrian, Mesopotamian, and Ugaritic goddess associated with love, oaths, illness, and the underworld, represented by a scorpion symbol on kudurru
- Isis, an Egyptian mother goddess who sometimes appeared as a scorpion and was accompanied and guarded by seven minor scorpion deities on her travels
- Lisin, also known as Negun, a Sumerian goddess identified with the star α Scorpionis, the "heart of Scorpion"
- Malinalxochitl, the Aztec goddess of snakes, scorpions, and insects of the desert
- Ningirima, a Mesopotamian goddess associated with incantations and the Scorpion star
- Serket, the Egyptian goddess of healing venomous stings and bites, originally the deification of the scorpion
- Ta-Bitjet, an Egyptian scorpion goddess with antivenomous secretions, consort to Horus

== See also ==
- Snake goddess (set index article)
