= Hundi (cash collection box) =

Collection box used in Indian temples

A hundi is a collection box used in Indian temples to collect cash offerings from devotees. During the 2016 demonetisation of high-value Indian banknotes, there were concerns that the discontinued Rs 500 and Rs 1,000 notes could be hidden in hundis, where monitoring isn't as stringent.
