= SIIMA Award for Best Female Debut – Malayalam =

South Indian International Movie Awards

- Awarded for: Best Debut Performance by an Actress in a Leading Role in Malayalam cinema
- Country: India
- Presented by: Vibri Media Group
- First award: 22 June 2012 (for films released in 2011)
- Most recent winner: Preity Mukhundhan, Maine Pyar Kiya (2025)

The SIIMA Award for Best Female Debut – Malayalam is an award, begun in 2012, presented annually at the South Indian International Movie Awards to a debut actress in the lead role via viewers and the winner is announced at the ceremony. The nominations for the category are given by the jury members.

== Winners and nominees ==
Table key
‡	Indicates the winner

=== 2010s ===
Year (Note: Refers to the film's release year)	Actor	Film	Ref.
2011 (1st)	Karthika Nair ‡	Makaramanju	
2012 (2nd)	Isha Talwar ‡	Thattathin Marayathu	
2012 (2nd)	Gauthami Nair	Diamond Necklace	
2012 (2nd)	Anusree	Diamond Necklace	
2012 (2nd)	Namitha Pramod	Puthiya Theerangal	
2012 (2nd)	Shritha Sivadas	Ordinary	
2013 (3rd)	Keerthy Suresh ‡	Geethaanjali	
2013 (3rd)	Aparna Gopinath	ABCD: American-Born Confused Desi	
2013 (3rd)	Andrea Jeremiah	Annayum Rasoolum	
2013 (3rd)	Reenu Mathews	Immanuel	
2013 (3rd)	Nyla Usha	Kunjananthante Kada	
2014 (4th)	Nikki Galrani ‡	1983	
2014 (4th)	Ahaana Krishna	Njan Steve Lopez	
2014 (4th)	Caroline Bech	Manglish	
2014 (4th)	Sandra Simon	Lal Bahadur Shastri	
2014 (4th)	Pearle Maaney	The Last Supper	
2015 (5th)	Sai Pallavi ‡	Premam	
2015 (5th)	Madonna Sebastian	Premam	
2015 (5th)	Anupama Parameswaran	Premam	
2015 (5th)	Manjima Mohan	Oru Vadakkan Selfie	
2015 (5th)	Deepti Sati	Nee-Na	
2016 (6th)	Rajisha Vijayan ‡	Anuraga Karikkin Vellam	
2016 (6th)	Huma Qureshi	White	
2016 (6th)	Varalaxmi Sarathkumar	Kasaba	
2016 (6th)	Aparna Balamurali	Maheshinte Prathikaaram	
2016 (6th)	Prayaga Martin	Oru Murai Vanthu Parthaya	
2017 (7th)	Nimisha Sajayan ‡	Thondimuthalum Driksakshiyum	
2017 (7th)	Aishwarya Lekshmi	Njandukalude Nattil Oridavela	
2017 (7th)	Anna Rajan	Angamaly Diaries	
2017 (7th)	Santhy Balachandran	Tharangam	
2017 (7th)	Wamiqa Gabbi	Godha	
2018 (8th)	Saniya Iyappan ‡	Queen	
2018 (8th)	Neeta Pillai	Poomaram	
2018 (8th)	Surabhi Santosh	Kuttanadan Marpappa	
2018 (8th)	Devika Sanjay	Njan Prakashan	
2018 (8th)	Sharanya R Nair	Maradona	
2019 (9th)	Anna Ben ‡	Helen	
2019 (9th)	Prachi Tehlan	Mamangam	
2019 (9th)	Priya Prakash Varrier	Oru Adaar Love	
2019 (9th)	Priyamvada Krishnan	Thottappan	
2019 (9th)	Sanjana Dipu	Moothon	

=== 2020s ===
Year	Actor	Film	Ref.
2020 (9th)	Kalyani Priyadarshan ‡	Varane Avashyamund	
2020 (9th)	India Jarvis	Kilometers and Kilometers	
2020 (9th)	Mirnaa Menon	Big Brother	
2020 (9th)	Thamanna Pramod	Forensic	
2021 (10th)	Anagha Narayanan ‡	Thinkalazhcha Nishchayam	
2021 (10th)	Gopika Udayan	Kunjeldho	
2021 (10th)	Yama Gilgamesh	Nayattu	
2021 (10th)	Ajisha Prabhakaran	Thinkalazhcha Nishchayam	
2021 (10th)	Femina George	Minnal Murali	
2022 (11th)	Gayathrie Shankar ‡	Nna Thaan Case Kodu	
2022 (11th)	Devi Varma	Saudi Vellakka	
2022 (11th)	Kayadu Lohar	Pathonpatham Noottandu	
2022 (11th)	Shanvi Srivastava	Mahaveeryar	
2022 (11th)	Radhika Radhakrishnan	Appan	
2023 (12th)	Anjana Jayaprakash ‡	Pachuvum Athbutha Vilakkum	
2023 (12th)	Abhirami Bose	Phoenix	
2023 (12th)	Anagha Maya Ravi	Kaathal – The Core	
2023 (12th)	Bhama Arun	Madanolsavam	
2023 (12th)	Zarin Shihab	B 32 Muthal 44 Vare	
2024 (13th)	Neha Nazneen ‡	Qalb	
2024 (13th)	Abhaya Hiranmayi	Pani	
2024 (13th)	Krithi Shetty	ARM	
2024 (13th)	Methil Devika	Kadha Innuvare	
2024 (13th)	Yukti Thareja	Marco	
2025 (14th)	Preity Mukhundhan ‡	Maine Pyar Kiya	
2025 (14th)	Sushmitha Bhat	Dominic and the Ladies' Purse	
2025 (14th)	Durga C. Vinod	Lokah Chapter 1: Chandra	
2025 (14th)	Raniya Rana	Prince and Family	
2025 (14th)	Revathy Sarma	Thalavara	
