= Hridhu Haroon =

Indian actor

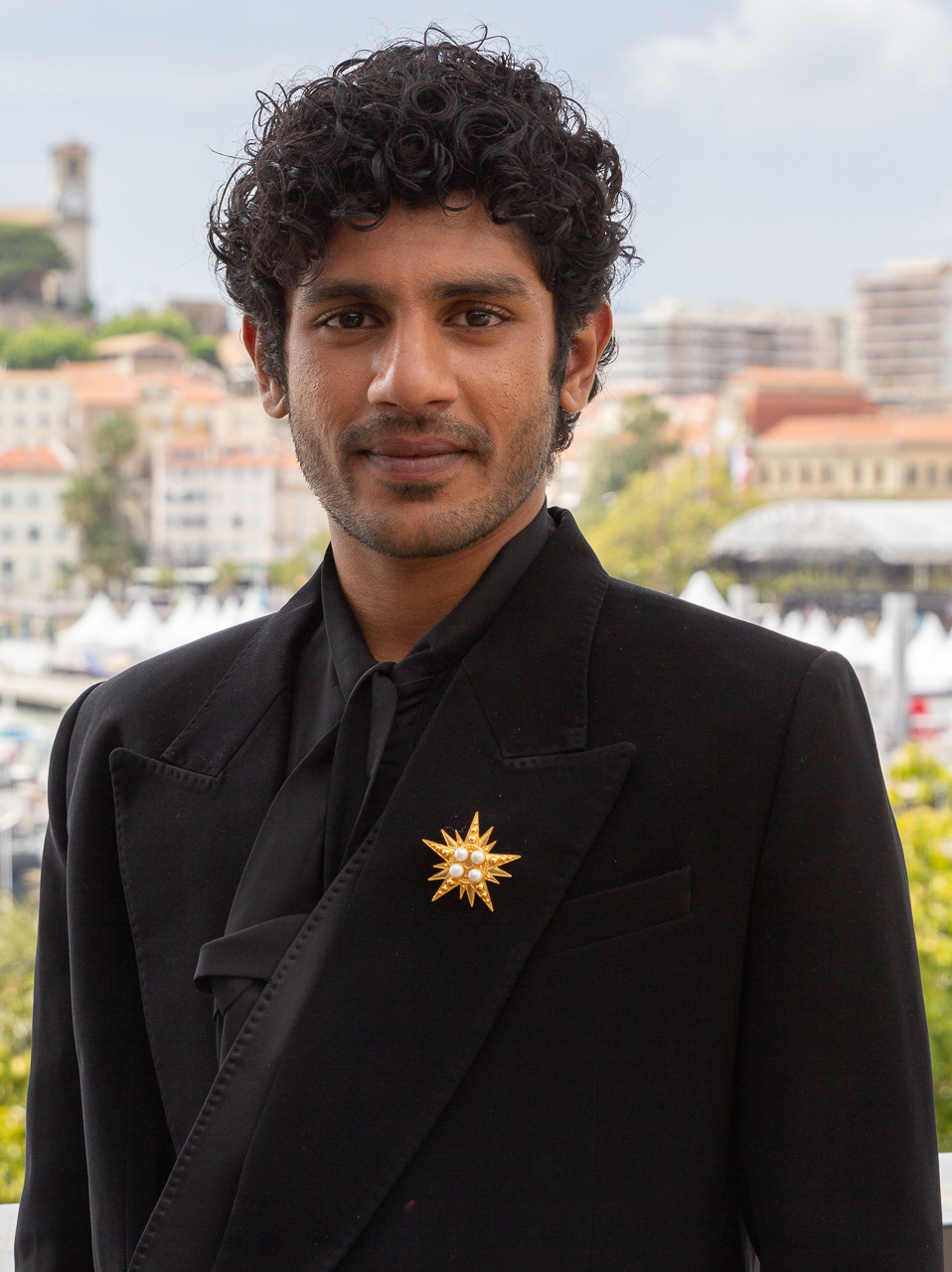
- Haroon at the 2024 Cannes Film Festival
- Born: Thiruvananthapuram, Kerala, India
- Occupation: Actor
- Years active: 2022–present
- Parent(s): Shibu Thameens (father); Riya Shibu (sister)

Hridhu Haroon is an Indian actor who works in Tamil, Malayalam, and Hindi films. He made his debut in the drama series Crash Course (2022), and has since starred in the independent film All We Imagine as Light (2024).

== Life and career ==
Hridhu Haroon is the son of producer Shibu Thameens of Thameens Films.

Haroon made his acting debut in the drama Crash Course which was released on Amazon Prime in August 2022 and directed by Vijay Maurya. In 2023 he made his feature film debut in Thugs, which is directed by Brinda Master. He starred in a leading role, along with Anaswara Rajan and Bobby Simha. That same year his next film Mumbaikar was released. The film was directed by Santosh Sivan and he starred along with Vikrant Massey and Vijay Sethupathi. In 2024 he acted in Payal Kapadia's film All We Imagine as Light, which won the Grand Prix at the 2024 Cannes Film Festival.

== Filmography ==
=== Film ===
Year	Title	Role	Language	Notes	Ref.
2023	Thugs	Sethu	Tamil	Filmfare Award for Best Male Debut – South	
2023	Mumbaikar	Aadil	Hindi		
2024	All We Imagine as Light	Shiaz	Malayalam; Hindi; Marathi		
2024	Mura	Anandu	Malayalam		
2025	Veera Dheera Sooran	—N/a	Tamil	Executive producer	
2025	Maine Pyar Kiya	Aryan	Malayalam		
2025	Bad Girl	Nalan	Tamil		
2025	Dude	Paari	Tamil		

=== Television ===
Year	Title	Role	Platform	Language	Ref.
2022	Crash Course	Sathya Srinivasan	Amazon Prime Video	Hindi	
