= Riya Shibu =

Indian film actress and producer

- Born: 25 September 2004 (age 22); Thiruvananthapuram, Kerala, India
- Occupations: Film producer; Actress
- Years active: 2021–present
- Father: Shibu Thameens
- Relatives: Hridhu Haroon (brother)

Riya Shibu (born 25 September 2004) is an Indian film producer and actress who works predominantly in the Malayalam and Tamil film industries. She is known for producing the films Mumbaikar (2023), Thugs (2023), Mura (2024) and Veera Dheera Sooran (2025). She made her acting debut in the 2024 Malayalam film Cup. Her breakthrough role came in 2025 through Sarvam Maya, in which she portrayed the titular character, Maya (Delulu).

== Personal life ==
Riya is the daughter of acclaimed film producer Shibu Thameens, who owns Thameens Films, a Chennai-based production company, along with Thameens Maax Theatre and Thameens Release, which handle the exhibition and distribution of Tamil and Malayalam films. Her brother, Hridhu Haroon, is also an actor who appears in the Tamil, Malayalam, and Hindi films.

Riya was born on 25 September 2004 and raised in India, attended Trivandrum International School, and pursued a degree in Visual Communication at Loyola College, Chennai.

== Career ==
=== Production ===
Riya began her career as a producer. In 2023, she produced the Hindi film Mumbaikar and the Tamil film Thugs. She is also the producer of the 2024 Malayalam film Mura and 2025 Tamil film Veera Dheera Sooran.

=== Acting ===
Riya made her acting debut in 2024 with the Malayalam film Cup, where she played the character Anna Kurien. Then she appeared in the 2025 film Sarvam Maya where her performance received acclaim.

== Filmography ==
Key
†	Denotes films that have not yet been released

=== As producer ===
Year	Title	Language	Notes
2023	Mumbaikar	Hindi	
2023	Thugs	Tamil	
2024	Mura	Malayalam	
2025	Veera Dheera Sooran	Tamil	

=== As actress ===
Year	Title	Role	Language	Notes
2013	ABCD: American-Born Confused Desi	Child artist	Malayalam	Uncredited role
2024	Cup	Anna Kurien	Malayalam	Acting debut
2025	Sarvam Maya	Maya Mathew Manjooran / Delulu	Malayalam	
2026	Athiradi	Swathi R. Krishna	Malayalam	
TBA	Power House	Keerthu	Tamil	

== Awards and nominations ==
Year	Award	Category	Result	Ref.
2026	Indian National Cine Academy Awards	Best Debut Actress – Malayalam	Won	
2026	Kerala Film Critics Association Awards	Best Newcomer – Actress	Won	
2026	14th South Indian International Movie Awards	Best Actress – Malayalam	Nominated	
2026	14th South Indian International Movie Awards	Critics Award for Best Actress – Malayalam	Won	
