= Muhammad Musthafa =

Indian film actor and director

- Born: Thenjipalam, Kerala
- Occupations: Actor; director
- Years active: 2005–present
- Known for: Kappela
- Awards: National Film Awards; Kerala State Film Awards

Muhammad Musthafa is an Indian actor and director who predominantly works in Malayalam film industry. He won a special mention for his performance in the film Ain in the 62nd National Film Awards.

Musthafa came into the limelight through the reality show Best Actor on Amrita TV. He has played major roles in films like Paleri Manikyam: Oru Pathirakolapathakathinte Katha and Penpattanam. He hails from Thenjipalam, Kerala.

== Filmography ==
=== As actor ===
Year	Film	Role	Notes
2005	Divorce: Not Between Husband and Wife	Nimith	Hindi film
2009	Dr. Patient		
2009	Paleri Manikyam: Oru Pathirakolapathakathinte Katha	Younger Keshavan	
2010	Malarvaadi Arts Club		
2010	Penpattanam	Ashraf	
2011	Urumi		
2011	Veeraputhran		
2011	Snehaveedu		
2012	Molly Aunty Rocks		
2012	Bavuttiyude Namathil	Gopi, Home Video Director	
2012	Last Bench	Sam Kutty	
2013	101 Chodhyangal		
2013	Isaac Newton S/O Philipose	Young Philippose	
2013	D Company: Oru Bolivian Diary 1995	Chaukidaar's Revolutionary	
2013	Punyalan Agarbattis	Party Leader	
2014	Njan		
2015	Loham	Rafeeq Muhammed	
2015	Urumbukal Urangarilla	Balu, Manoj's friend	
2015	Ain	Maanu	
2016	Kochavva Paulo Ayyappa Coelho	Saji	
2016	Oru Muthassi Gadha	Zacharia's son	
2017	Sinjar	Ansar	
2017	Aakashathinum Bhoomikkumidayil		
2017	Sakhavu	Sakhavu Basheer	
2018	Theevandi	Imbichi Koya	
2018	Chalakkudykkaran Changathy	Rajkumar's Fan	
2018	Thanaha	Sebastian	
2019	Oru Caribbean Udayippu	Koshy	
2019	The Gambinos	Alex	
2020	Kappela	Abu	
2021	Who is Right		Short Film
2026	Drishyam 3	Aneesh Raja	

=== As director ===
Year	Film	Cast	Notes	Ref
2020	Kappela	Anna Ben; Roshan Mathew; Sreenath Bhasi	Debut film	
2024	Mura	Suraj Venjaramoodu; Hridhu Haroon; Krish Hassan		

== TV ==
1. Best Actor (Amritha TV) - Reality show
2. Oru Cilma Kadha (Amritha TV) - serial
3. Khali Whalli (Kairali TV) - serial

== Awards and nominations ==
Year	Award	Category	Film	Result
2015	National Film Awards	Special Mention (Acting)	Ain	Won
2020	Kerala State Film Awards	Best Debutant Director	Kappela	Won
2020	SIIMA Awards	Best Debutant Director	Kappela	Nominated
