= Kani Kusruti =

Indian actress

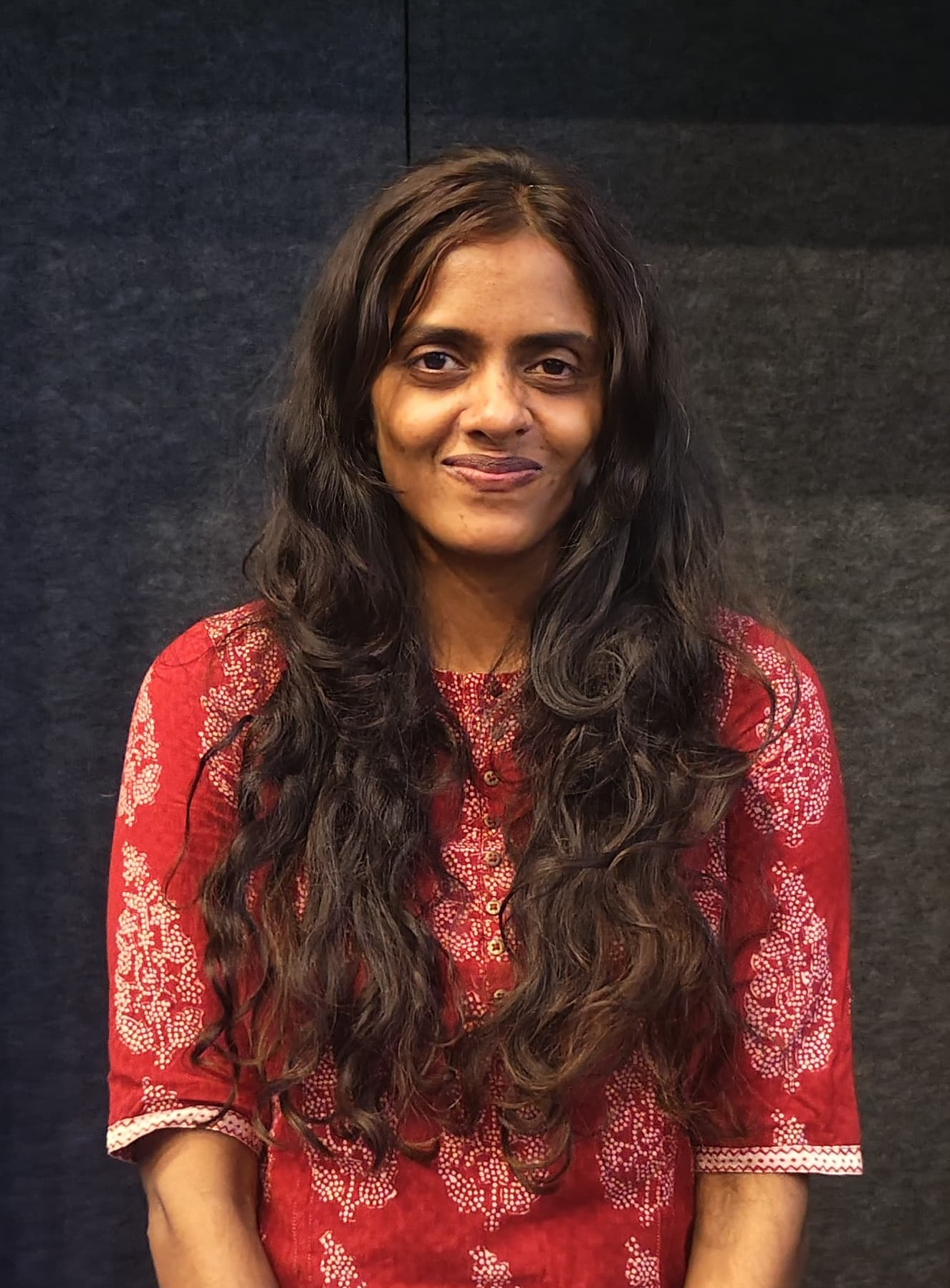
- Kusruti in 2025
- Born: Thiruvananthapuram, Kerala, India
- Education: School Of Drama, Thrissur; L'École Internationale de Théâtre Jacques Lecoq
- Occupation: Actress
- Years active: 2000–present
- Partner: Anand Gandhi (2015–2021)

Kani Kusruti is an Indian actress known primarily for her work in Malayalam films. She first gained recognition in 2009 with the film Kerala Cafe, in which her performance was critically acclaimed. Kani won the Best Actress at Kerala State Film Awards and the Best Actress Award at the Moscow International Film Festival for her performance in the film Biriyaani (2019). She has since starred in the independent films All We Imagine as Light and Girls Will Be Girls (both 2024).

== Early life and education ==
Kani Kusruti was born in Cheruvakkal, a small village in Thiruvananthapuram, Kerala, to social activist parents Jayasree A. K. and Maitreya Maitreyan. Her parents had dropped their last names to erase the social hierarchy marker that comes with last names in India. At 15, she invented her last name "Kusruti" (meaning "mischievous" in Malayalam) to fill in a requirement in her class 10th exam application. She grew up in Thiruvananthapuram, where she got introduced to the Abhinaya Theatre Research Centre.

Kusruti later moved to Thrissur, where she enrolled in the theatre arts program at the Thrissur School of Drama between 2005 and 2007. She completed her theatre education at the L'École Internationale de Théâtre Jacques Lecoq, where she studied physical theatre for two years.

== Career ==
At Abhinaya, Kusruti made her theatre debut in Baudhayana's classic farce Bhagavadajjukam. She played the lead role of Vasantsena in the production from 2000 to 2006. The play toured across theatre festivals, including the Bharat Rang Mahotsav and the International Theatre Festival of Kerala. She rendered the part of Kamala in M. G. Jyotish's stage adaptation of Hermann Hesse's Siddhartha. In 2007, the production was invited to the Villeneuve en Scene Festival d'Avignon.

In 2009, after returning from her studies at L'École Internationale de Théâtre Jacques Lecoq, Kusruti appeared in the anthology film Kerala Cafe, in which her performance was critically acclaimed She appears in the segment "Island Express", directed by Shankar Ramakrishnan.

In 2010, she played a Naxalite in the Mohanlal starrer Shikkar, but her nuanced rendition of a sex worker in the 2010 film Cocktail got her noticed by mainstream audiences.

In December 2010, Kani collaborated on creating 'Las Indias', a "mega performance event" directed by the thespian and theatre pedagogist Elias Cohen. The performance was staged in a bus, that was designed for the production. The Indo-Latin American theatre company, the Singing Sticks Theatre Ensemble evolved out of Las Indias. The bus that was originally created for Las Indias, was used once again for an interactive theatre roadshow 'Tsunami Express: Highway of Hopes', which Kusruti collaborated on making.

In 2011, Kani joined the renowned touring theatre company Footsbarn to work on a new production of Shakespeare's Tempest. She played Miranda in the resulting performance "The Indian Tempest". After touring Ireland, Spain, France, Portugal and India, the production opened at Shakespeare's Globe in 2013.

Kusruti researched, co-developed and acted in the Indo-Polish production 'Burning Flowers - 7 Dreams of a Woman', directed by Pawel Szkotak and produced by Teatr Biuro Podróży.

In 2015, Kusruti became a household presence with the soap opera Eswaran Sakshiyayi, directed by K. K. Rajeev. She played the part of Advocate Tresa, a lawyer who joins in on the investigation for her brother's murder.

In 2020, upon being awarded Best Actress in Malayalam for her performance in Biriyaani, she dedicated the win to PK Rosy, the first actress in Malayalam cinema.

== Recognitions ==
- 2024 – Kusruti was a member of the jury at the 2024 Busan International Film Festival for its main competition section, "New Currents Award".
- 2025 – She was appointed as a member of the jury at the 78th Locarno Film Festival for Concorso Cineasti del Presente – Filmmakers of the Present Competition.

== Awards and nominations ==
List of Kani Kusruti's awards and nominations
Year	Award	Category	Nominated Work	Result	Ref.
2019	Rome Prisma Independent Film Awards	Best Actress	Counterfeit Kunkoo	Won	
2019	Kerala State Film Awards	Kerala State Film Award for Best Actress	Biriyaani	Won	
2020	BRICS Competition section in 42nd Moscow International Film Festival	Best Actress	Biriyani	Won	
2021	Filmfare OTT Awards	Best Actor (Female) – Comedy	OK Computer	Won	
2021	Filmfare OTT Awards	Best Actor (Female) – Popular awards	OK Computer	Nominated	
2021	New York Indian Film Festival	Best Actress	Biriyani	Nominated	
2022	67th Filmfare Awards South	Best Actress: Critics	Biriyani	Won	
2022	67th Filmfare Awards South	Best Actress: Malayalam Cinema	Biriyani	Nominated	
2022	Indian Film and Television Awards	Best Supporting Actress in a Series	OK Computer	Nominated	
2022	Hitlist OTT Awards	Best Supporting Actor -Female	OK Computer	Nominated	
2023	Critics’ Choice Shorts and Series Awards, India	Best Supporting Actress	Maharani	Nominated	
2024	FOI Online Awards	Best Actress in a Supporting Role	Girls Will Be Girls	Won	
2024	OTTplay Awards	Breakthrough Performance of the Year - Female	Girls Will Be Girls	Nominated	
2024	Asia Pacific Screen Awards	Best Performance	All We Imagine as Light	Nominated	
2024	VHS Awards	Best Actress	All We Imagine as Light	Nominated	
2025	Filmfare OTT Awards	Best Supporting Actor, Web Original Film (Female)	Girls Will Be Girls	Won	
2025	Film Independent Spirit Awards	Best Supporting Performance	Girls Will Be Girls	Nominated	
2025	International Indian Film Academy Awards	Best Performance in a Supporting Role Series - Female	Maharani	Nominated	
2025	Asian Film Awards	Best Actress	All We Imagine as Light	Nominated	
2025	IMDb STARmeter Awards	Breakout Star	-	Won	
2025	International Cinephile Society Awards	Best Actress	All We Imagine as Light	Nominated	
2025	Times of India Film Awards	Acting Excellence in a Supporting Role - Female in Web Films	Girls Will Be Girls	Nominated	
2025	Critics' Choice Film Awards, India	Best Actress	All We Imagine as Light	Nominated	
2025	Critics’ Choice Shorts and Series Awards, India	Best Supporting Actress	Poacher	Won	
2025	Critics’ Choice Shorts and Series Awards, India	Best Supporting Actress	Girls Will Be Girls	Won	

== Personal life ==
Kusruti is an atheist and rationalist.

Kusruti resides in Goa with her friends. She has publicly identified with feminist perspectives and has spoken on social and political issues, including gender equality and civil liberties. She has also criticised sexism in the Malayalam film industry.

== Filmography ==
=== Films ===
Key
†	Denotes films that have not yet been released

Year	Title	Role	Language	Notes
2003	Anyar	Bus Passenger	Malayalam	
2003	Manushyaputhri	Lakshmi	Malayalam	
2007	A Flowering Tree	Amma	Malayalam	Short film
2009	Kerala Cafe	Zeba	Malayalam	Segment: Island Express
2010	Shikkar	Naxalite	Malayalam	
2010	Cocktail	Elsa	Malayalam	
2011	Urumi	Singer	Malayalam	
2011	Silent Dark Eyes	Woman	English	Short film
2012	Karmayogi	Penn Jyothiyamma	Malayalam	
2013	Oru Indian Pranayakadha	Police Commissioner	Malayalam	
2013	North 24 Kaatham	Lajjo	Malayalam	
2013	Hotel California	Guest role	Malayalam	
2013	Natholi Oru Cheriya Meenalla	Flat resident	Malayalam	
2014	Masala Republic	AGS Officer	Malayalam	
2014	Pisaasu	Angry husband's wife	Tamil	
2014	Burma	Clara	Tamil	
2015	Padakkam	Prostitute	Malayalam	Short film
2015	The Dolphins	Varalakshmi	Malayalam	
2016	Kalam	Housekeeper	Tamil	
2016	Memories of a Machine	Lady	Malayalam	Short film
2017	Gi	Gi	Malayalam	Short films
2017	Thadayam	Jenny	Tamil	Short films
2017	Touch	Selvi	Tamil	Short films
2017	Spyder	Sudalai/Bhairavadu's Mother	Tamil; Telugu	
2018	Maa	Sathya	Tamil	Short film
2018	Theekuchiyum Panithulliyum	Thanuja	Malayalam	
2018	The Notion	Padma Iyer	English	Short film
2018	Counterfeit Kunkoo	Smita Sunil Nikam	Hindi, Marathi	Short film
2019	Oolu	Manasi	Malayalam	
2019	Biriyaani	Khadeeja	Malayalam	
2020	The Discreet Charm of the Savarnas		English	Short film
2021	Tryst with Destiny	Ahalya	Hindi; English	
2021	1956, Central Travancore	Kela's wife	Malayalam	
2021	Vicks - Care Lives On	Priyanka Bhosale	Hindi	Short film
2022	Super Sharanya	Pedestrian	Malayalam	Cameo appearance
2022	Pada	Sheeja P.K.	Malayalam	
2022	Vichithram	Martha	Malayalam	
2022	Nishiddho	Chaavi	Malayalam	
2022	Vazhakku	Sathi	Malayalam	
2023	Kirkkan	Farsana Rasheed	Malayalam	
2024	All We Imagine as Light	Nurse Prabha	Malayalam	
2024	Girls Will Be Girls	Mother Anila	Hindi; English	
2024	Mura	Asha	Malayalam	
2025	Ouseppinte Osyath	Dhanya	Malayalam	
2026	Assi	Parima	Hindi	
2026	Anchaam Pramaanam †	TBA	Malayalam	

=== Television ===
Year	Title	Role	Language	Channel	Ref
2015	Ishwaran Sakshiyayi	Adv.Tresa	Malayalam	Flowers TV	
2021	OK Computer	Monalisa Paul	Hindi	Disney+ Hotstar	
2021	Maharani S4	Kaveri Sridharan	Hindi	SonyLIV	
2024	Killer Soup	Kirtima Kadathanathan	Hindi	Netflix	
2024	Poacher	DFO Dina	Malayalam	Amazon Prime Video	
2024	Thalaimai Seyalagam	Durga	Tamil	ZEE5	
2024	Nagendran's Honeymoons	Thankam	Malayalam	Disney+ Hotstar	
2026	Eyes	Tina	Malayalam	SonyLIV	
