= Jack & Daniel =

2019 Indian Malayalam-language film

- Theatrical release poster
- Directed by: S.L. Puram Jayasurya
- Written by: S. L. Puram Jayasurya
- Produced by: Shibu Thameens
- Starring: Dileep; Arjun; Anju Kurian; Saiju Kurup
- Cinematography: Sivakumar Vijayan
- Edited by: Johnkutty
- Music by: Shaan Rahman; Gopi Sundar
- Production company: Thameens Films
- Distributed by: Thameens Release
- Release date: 15 November 2019 (India)
- Running time: 160 minutes
- Country: India
- Language: Malayalam

Jack & Daniel is a 2019 Indian Malayalam-language action thriller film written and directed by S.L. Puram Jayasurya. The film was produced by Shibu Thameens through Thameens Films. It stars Dileep and Arjun in titular roles, with Anju Kurian, Saiju Kurup, Ashokan, Innocent, Janardhanan, Devan, Riyaz Khan and Suresh Krishna. Shaan Rahman and Gopi Sundar composed the film's soundtrack and score.

Jack & Daniel was theatrically released on 15 November 2019, where it received mixed reviews from critics and underperformed at the box office.

== Plot ==
Daniel Alexander IPS is tasked by Kerala Home Minister Koyapparamban and the CM to capture a thief named Jackson 'Jack' Mathew who steals black money and leaves no traces of evidence behind. Jack has robbed 14 times and stole around ₹1,780 crore. Daniel accepts the case and finds out that Jack recently robbed a ISBC Bank, where he checks the CCTV footages and realizes that as media was taking coverage of the ISBC bank incident, one person went to the bathroom with a bag which was empty, but the man came out with a full bag.

Daniel suspects that the man is Jack who disguised himself as a cameraman. Daniel almost sees Jack's face through CCTV, but he is overlapped by people. Daniel heads the place where Jack had parked his car (when he robbed the bank) with two police officers SI Hari and DYSP Philipose. Daniel uses the CCTV of a shopping mall nearby and figures out that Jack was not working alone. Later, Daniel also sees Jack's face as Jack accidentally shows his face to the CCTV after a bird runs into him. Daniel gets more information of Jack and his various business. Philipose, Hari and other officers pose as Income tax officers and launch a raid in Jack's house to get proof that Jack is the thief.

They search for a while, but find nothing. Jack's accomplice RK Nairbsuspects that the raid was not an accident and sends Jack to Goa. At the airport, Jack meets Sushmita and falls in love with her. They go to a chess competition where Jack registers Sushmita. Sushmita follows Jack's instructions and wins the chess competition winning the price money of ₹50,000, but the chess host and his gang threatens to kill Sushmita unless Jack gives the price money to them. Jack thrashes them and they both leave. Unknown to them, Philipose had been following Jack where he had also recorded the fight. Philipose shows the video to Daniel and concludes that Jack is a trained fighter. Hari follows Jack and Sushmita as they head to Jack's house.

Jack tells Sushmita that a black money transaction will happen at a hotel tomorrow and that the receiver of the money is Koyapparamban. Jack tells Sushmita that she can tell this information to anyone and try to thwart Koyapparamban's plan. Sushmita, who saw Hari follow them, tells Hari about this. After Hari reveals the information, Daniel realizes that Jack will be there to steal the money so he and his team plan to arrest him. Following the plan, Philipose and Hari follow Jack. Daniel sees Koyapparamban shift the money in another car which drives in another direction. Daniel tells Philipose and Hari to follow the other car, but they keep on following Jack instead. Daniel follows the other car and Jack follows the other car. Jack steals the money and escapes with the money.

Jack dresses up as a woman and steals jewellery from a shop. Sushmita develops feelings for Jack and later sees him at a soldier's funeral. Sushmita is later revealed to be a cop. Daniel who searched Jack's history, tells Sushmita that Jack is a ex-NSG commando. When Sushmita tells Jack that she saw him at the funeral Jack reveals about his backstory. During the time, Jack was an NSG commando, who along with his brother Jerald Matthew go on a mission together, but Jerald is killed, where his wife commits suicide. Jerald's children are sent to boarding school. It is revealed that Jack steals money for them. Sushmita and Jack go for a holiday to a resort. Sushmita informs Daniel of where they are.

Unknown to Sushmita, Jack plans on stealing a bank which is across the street from the resort. Sushmita later figures this out and tells Daniel. The bank is also where Koyapparamban and the CM plans a black money transaction. Jack tells Sushmita that he knew that she was a police officer from the beginning and was just playing along. The next day, Jack dresses as a guard to rob the bank. Sushmita sees this and tells Daniel. Daniel and his team get ready to arrest Jack, but later escapes. Jack kills the CCTV operative and cuts the connection of the building, where he steals a necklace and Sushmita comes to the bank and tries to arrest him, but Jack puts handcuffs on Sushmita's hand and escapes.

Daniel arrives and chases after Jack with the help of fellow police officers including Philipose and Hari. Daniel and Jack reach the helicopter landing area of a building and fight each other. They fight equally until Jack jumps from the building and crashes through a window, where they find Koyapparamban and the CM with the black money. After seeing the black money, Jack and Daniel team up and arrests both of them. Jack escapes with some of the black money. Daniel visits Jack and gives him a location to Punjab indicating that Daniel is also a thief now, where they both leave for Punjab.

== Cast ==
- Dileep as Jackson 'Jack' Mathew Kalappurakkal, An Ex- NSG commando
- Arjun as Daniel Alexander IPS, CBI officer
- Anju Kurian as SSP Sushmita IPS, Jack's love interest
- Saiju Kurup as DYSP Philippose
- Ashokan as SI Hari
- Innocent as Home Minister Koyapparamba
- Janardhanan as Chief Minister Sadanandan Kurup
- Devan as GK Nair, an accomplice of Jack
- Suresh Krishna as Jerald 'Jerry' Mathew Kalappurakkal, Jack's brother
- Sadiq as Raman
- G. Suresh Kumar as DGP Mohammed Yonus IPS
- Lakshmi Gopalaswamy as Kathreena Mathew, Jerry's wife and Jack's sister-in-law
- Riyaz Khan as an NRI guest at hotel in Goa (Cameo)
- Balachandran Chullikkadu as Krishan
- Appa Haja as Hisbullah
- Juby Ninan as Club Master
- Majeed as City Police Commissioner
- Peter Hein as himself (Cameo)
- Chali Pala as a Kunjikannan, Politician
- Ponnamma Babu as Padma Shenoy
- Subbalakshmi as Muthassi

=== Cameo appearances via archived Footage ===
- Prabhas in Bahubali 2 film video
- Mohanlal in Pulimurugan film video
- Mammootty in Madhuraraja film video
- Rajinikanth in Petta film video

== Soundtrack ==
Jack & Daniel

Soundtrack album by Shaan Rahman and Gopi Sundar
- Released: 9 November 2019
- Recorded: 2019
- Genre: Feature film soundtrack
- Length: 10:18
- Language: Malayalam
- Label: Muzik 247

Shaan Rahman chronology
Pranaya Meenukalude Kadal (2019)	Jack & Daniel (2019)	Helen (2019)

Gopi Sundar chronology
Isakkinte Ithihasam (2019)	Jack & Daniel (2019)	Happy Sardar (2019)

The music is composed by Shaan Rahman and Gopi Sundar. The lyrics are written by BK Harinarayanan. The promo song "Evide Thirayum" was released on 9 November 2019, sung by George Peter and composed by Gopi Sundar. The other two songs "Ee Vazhi" and "Aarambambo" were composed by Shaan Rahman.

Track listing
No.	Title	Music	Singer(s)	Length
1.	"Evide Thirayum (Promo Song)"	Gopi Sundar	George Peter	3:49
2.	"Ee Vazhi"	Shaan Rahman	Haricharan, Pavithra Menon	3:33
3.	"Aarambambo"	Shaan Rahman	Niranj Suresh, Shaan Rahman	3:36
Total length:				10:18

== Release ==
Jack & Daniel was released in India on 15 November 2019 along with Helen.

== Reception ==
Jack & Daniel received mixed reviews from critics.

=== Critical reception ===
Deepa Antony of The Times of India gave 2 out of 5 stars and wrote " 'Jack and Daniel' has nothing new to offer. It is old wine in an old bottle, in that it's the same good cop chasing a good thief story in a predated narrative which we have all heard and seen far too many times." Anna M. M. Vetticad of Firstpost gave 1.8 out of 5 stars and wrote "Jack & Daniel picks up post-interval when the screenplay has the protagonists playing off each other instead of showing them operate in separate spaces."
