= Mura (film) =

- Directed by: Muhammad Musthafa
- Written by: Suresh Babu
- Produced by: Riya Shibu
- Starring: Hridhu Haroon; Suraj Venjaramoodu; Krish Hassan; Kani Kusruti; Maala Parvathi
- Cinematography: Fazil Nazer
- Edited by: Chaman Chakko
- Music by: Christy Joby
- Production company: HR Pictures
- Distributed by: HR Pictures Phars Films (International) Yash Raj Films (UK/Europe)
- Release date: 8 November 2024
- Country: India
- Language: Malayalam

Mura (transl. Sequence) is a 2024 Indian Malayalam-language action thriller film directed by Muhammad Musthafa and written by Suresh Babu. It stars Suraj Venjaramoodu, Hridhu Haroon, Krish Hassan, Maala Parvathi and Kani Kusruti. The film was released on November 8 2024 to positive response.

== Plot ==
This high-octane film revolves around a group of young men who embark on a dangerous mission to break into a vault loaded with black money.

== Cast ==
- Hridhu Haroon as Anandu
- Suraj Venjaramoodu as Ani (Aniyannan)
- Krish Hassan as Malar
- Kani Kusruti as Asha
- Maala Parvathi as Ramadevi
- P. L. Thenappan as Ratnam
- Siby joseph as Kumar
- Jobin Das as Shaji
- Anujith Kannan as Manafa
- Yedhu Krishna as Manu
- Vigneshwar Suresh as Sitru
- Kannan Nayar as Suni
- Alfred Jose as Dsp Deva
- Amaldarsh K P
- Seema Sindhu Krishnan
- Ami Thilak
- Gouri A S
- Suresh Babuo
- Deepak Prabhakaran as Manu's Father

== Production ==
Mura is the second directorial of Muhammad Musthafa after Kappela. The screenplay was written by Suresh Babu, known for the television sitcom Uppum Mulakum. The filming lasted 57 days, at locations such as Thiruvananthapuram, Madurai, Tenkasi, and Bangalore. The filming was wrapped up in the first week of April 2024 in Thiruvananthapuram.
