= Thameens Films =

Indian film production company

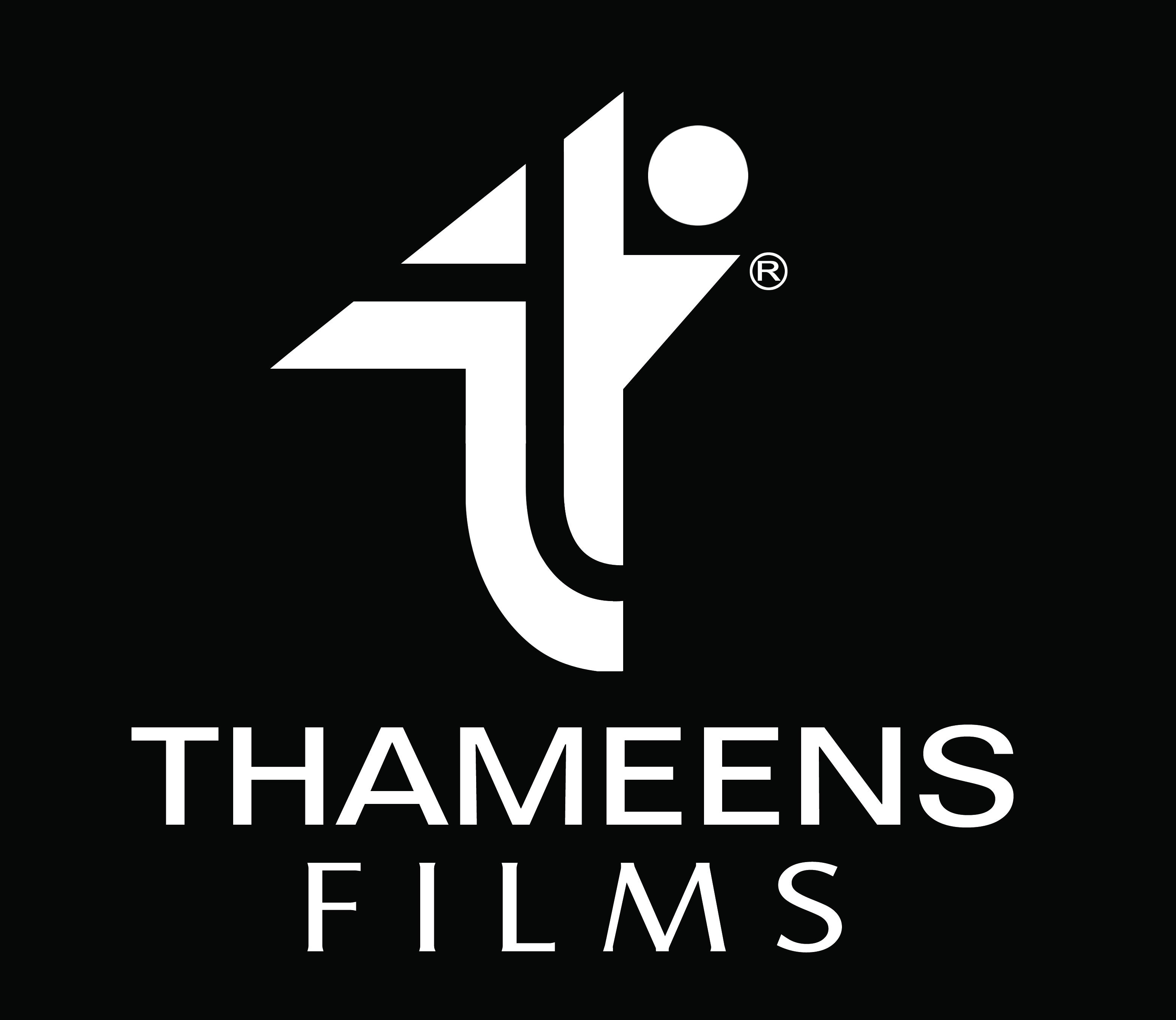
- Founded: 2000
- Headquarters: Chennai, Tamil Nadu, India
- Key people: Shibu Thameens
- Products: Film Production; Film Distribution
- Parent: HR Pictures
- Website: www.thameens.com

Thameens Films is an Indian film production company based in Chennai, Tamil Nadu. It was founded in early 2000 by Shibu Thameens, who also runs Thameens Maax Theatre and Thameens Release for distribution of Tamil and Malayalam. They have distributed around 101 films in different languages across regions.

In 2015, Shibu ventured into film production, under Thameens Films, with Puli.

== Filmography ==
=== Films Produced ===
Year	Title	Cast	Director	Notes
2013	ABCD: American-Born Confused Desi	Dulquer Salman, Jacob Gregory, Aparna Gopinath, Tovino Thomas	Martin Prakkat	Best Female Debutant at SIIMA 2014; Best Comedian at SIIMA 2014
2015	Puli	Vijay, Sridevi, Hansika Motwani, Shruti Haasan,Sudeep	Chimbu Devan	Yendi Yendi song wins Most streamed song at SIIMA
2016	Iru Mugan	Vikram, Nayanthara	Anand Shankar	Nominated at Filmfare Awards 2017 for Best Actor, Best Actress, Best Music Director.
2018	Rosapoo	Biju Menon, Neeraj Madhav, Anjali	Vinu Joseph	
2018	Saamy Square	Vikram, Keerthy Suresh	Hari	
2019	Jack & Daniel	Dileep, Arjun Sarja, Anju Kurian	SL Puram Jayasurya	

=== Films Distributed under Thameens Films ===
- All films are in Tamil, unless otherwise noted.

Year	Title	Director	Ref.
2002	Thamizhan	Majith	
2002	Run	N. Lingusamy	
2003	Saamy	Hari	
2003	Jay Jay	Saran	
2005	Anniyan	S. Shankar	
2009	Vettaikaran	B. Babusivan	

=== Films Distributed under HR Pictures ===
Year	Title	Director	Language	Ref.
2022	RRR	S.S.Rajamouli	Malayalam	
2022	Vikram	Lokesh Kanagaraj	Tamil	

=== Films Produced under HR Pictures ===
Year	Title	Director	Language	Ref.
2023	Thugs	Brinda	Tamil	
2023	Mumbaikar	Santosh Sivan	Hindi	
2024	Mura	Muhammad Musthafa	Malayalam	
2025	Veera Dheera Sooran	S. U. Arun Kumar	Tamil	
