= Sarvam Maya =

- Theatrical release poster
- Directed by: Akhil Sathyan
- Written by: Akhil Sathyan
- Produced by: Ajayya Kumar; Rajeev Menon
- Starring: Nivin Pauly; Riya Shibu; Preity Mukhundhan; Aju Varghese; Janardhanan
- Cinematography: Sharan Velayudhan
- Edited by: Akhil Sathyan; Rathin Radhakrishnan
- Music by: Justin Prabhakaran
- Production companies: Firefly Films; Akhil Sathyan Films
- Distributed by: Central Pictures
- Release date: 25 December 2025
- Running time: 146 minutes
- Country: India
- Language: Malayalam
- Budget: ₹30 crore
- Box office: ₹150 crore

Sarvam Maya (transl. Everything is a delusion) is a 2025 Indian Malayalam-language supernatural fantasy romantic comedy film written and directed by Akhil Sathyan. Produced by Firefly Films, the film stars Nivin Pauly, Riya Shibu and Preity Mukhundhan in the lead roles along with, Aju Varghese, Janardhanan, Raghunath Paleri, Madhu Warrier,Vineeth Radhakrishnan, and Methil Devika in supporting roles. The film is produced by Ajayya Kumar and Rajeev Menon under Firefly Productions.

Sarvam Maya released worldwide on 25 December 2025 in theatres, coinciding with Christmas. The film received critical acclaim. It has emerged as a commercial success and became fourth highest-grossing Malayalam film of 2025 and one of the highest-grossing Malayalam films of all time.

== Plot ==
Prabhendu Namboothiri is an aspiring guitarist born into a traditional Brahmin priest family in Palakkad who is part of a musical troupe. Though he was born into a Brahmin family, he is now an atheist completely staying away from traditions, temple and rituals. With the troupe about to go on tour to Europe, his visa application is rejected due to budget constraints, and he returns to his hometown of Palakkad. Unable to find stable work, he agrees to temporarily assist his cousin Roopesh, who works as a priest and begins to earn money. Despite his atheistic views, Prabhendu performs well due to his extensive training in the Vedas. After Roopesh meets with a freak accident, he requests Prabhendu to take over his existing commitments. One of these is an exorcism ritual for a teenage boy, Avinash, who claims to see a young woman constantly approaching him and suffers from a loss of appetite. To Prabhendu's surprise, the ritual appears successful, and Avinash returns to normal. Now he earns large amounts of money too.

Soon after, Prabhendu begins experiencing strange incidents, such as his WhatsApp profile picture changing unexpectedly and unfamiliar items being ordered from his Amazon account. One night, he encounters a mysterious young woman in his room who abruptly disappears. These encounters continue, and the woman eventually reveals that she is the spirit exorcised from Avinash. Visible only to Prabhendu, she has no memory of her identity or past. After assisting him in an audition for a Bollywood music director, the two develop a close emotional bond, and he nicknames her “Delulu.”

Delulu supports Prabhendu in his musical pursuits and encourages him to reconnect with his estranged father following the death of his mother. Meanwhile, she attempts to recover her lost memories. After Prabhendu moves to Mumbai, he grows closer to Saadhya, the manager who helped him secure his opportunity. As Delulu gradually develops romantic feelings for Prabhendu, he hesitates, stating that such a relationship is impossible and expressing his feelings for Saadhya instead.

Following a near-fatal road accident, Delulu regains her memories. She recalls that her real name is Maya Mathew Manjooran and that she lived in Kuttikkanam, Idukki. She had been in love with her senior and was traveling with her family to confess her feelings when she met with a vehicular accident and was declared brain-dead. It is revealed that Avinash had accompanied her younger brother to the hospital upon hearing of the accident.

After fully recalling her past, Maya embraces Prabhendu, allowing him to experience her memories. As he comes to understand her life and emotions, he sheds a tear. With her story acknowledged and her existence understood, Maya disappears peacefully.

Following this, Prabhendu confides in his uncle, Prahladan about Maya. He reflects on how Maya's parents were never able to see the man she loved and expresses a desire to offer them some form of emotional closure. Acting on this, Prabhendu later travels to Kuttikkanam and meets Maya's mother Annie, introducing himself as someone close to her. When she asks if he was the person Maya loved, Prabhendu pauses before saying yes to her, choosing to comfort her family.

As he leaves the house, he feels a gentle breeze, recalling Maya's earlier description of it as a sign of her presence. In the end, guided by her memories and influence, Prabhendu fulfills his dream of becoming a musician, with Saadhya in his life.

== Cast ==
- Nivin Pauly as Prabhendhu N. Namboothiri (Prabha/Indu)
- Riya Shibu as Maya Mathew Manjooran (Delulu)
- Preity Mukhundhan as Saadhya
- Aju Varghese as Roopesh Namboothiri (Rupa), Prabhendhu's cousin
- Janardhanan as Prahladan Namboothiri, Prabhendhu's elder uncle (paternal)
- Raghunath Paleri as Neelakandan Namboothiri, Prabhendhu's father
- Madhu Wariar as Deepankuran N. Namboothiri (Deepu), Prabhendhu's elder brother
- Arun Ajikumar as Sreerag, a drug peddler
- Vineeth as Vinod Mathew Manjooran, Delulu's father
- Methil Devika as Annie Mathew Manjooran, Delulu's mother
- Dhruvan Sankar as Jacob (Chacko) Mathew Manjooran, Delulu's brother
- Anand Ekarshi as Faisal
- Jaya Kurup as Roopesh's mother
- Althaf Salim as Delivery boy
- Vijeesh as Sreekuttan, Roopesh's assistant
- Saumya Bhagyan Pilla as Thulasi
- Reshmi Boban as Deepthi, Avinash's mother
- Srikant Murali as Krishnan Panicker
- Vijilesh Karayad as Animon
- Manikandan Pattambi as Saji Pattambi
- Chembil Ashokan as Tabla Chacko
- Niyas Backer as Client
- Nandan Unni as the Passport Verification Assistant
- RJ Twinkle Sheethal as Receptionist girl (Chockichosky)
- Aniyappan as House Owner
- Viji Viswanathan as Malu, Deepu's wife
- Basil P Reji as Kuttoos / Avinash
- Salim Hassan as Paulose
- Alphonse Puthren as Dr. Rafael (cameo appearance)
- Priya Prakash Varrier as Prabhendu's co-passenger through whom Delulu communicates (cameo appearance)

== Production ==
=== Development ===
In December 2023, Nivin Pauly announced he was collaborating with director Akhil Sathyan for the latter's sophomore directorial. Sathyan's debut film, Pachuvum Athbutha Vilakkum (2023), was initially set to feature Nivin as the lead actor before he was replaced with Fahadh Faasil. Sathyan confirmed the project the following May. The official title, Sarvam Maya, was announced in July 2025. The theatrical release date poster was revealed on 20 November 2025. Principal photography wrapped in November 2025.

== Music ==
The music and background score is composed by Justin Prabhakaran.

Track listing
No.	Title	Lyrics	Singer(s)	Length
1.	"Chiri Thottu"	Manu Manjith, Aron Mathew (English)	Chinmayi Sripada, Justin Prabhakar, Weldon	4:32
2.	"Vellarathaaram"	Manu Manjith	Vineeth Sreenivasan	4:39
3.	"Puthu Mazha"	Manu Manjith	Shakthisree Gopalan	4:22
4.	"Mayajaalame"	Manu Manjith	Sooraj Santhosh	4:27
5.	"Nearer My God To Thee - Delulu's Goodbye"	Sarah Flower Adams	Justin Prabhakaran, Sarah Flower Adams	2:53
6.	"Nokkada Nammude - Fight Remix"	Kunchan Nambiar	Kalamandalam Prasoon, Kalamandalam Kavya, Geethanandan	1:38

== Release ==
=== Theatrical ===
Sarvam Maya was released on 25 December 2025, coinciding with Christmas with a clean U certificate from CBFC.

=== Home media ===
The post-theatrical digital streaming rights of Sarvam Maya were acquired by JioHotstar. The film began streaming on the platform from 30 January 2026. The satellite rights of the film is acquired by Asianet and premiered on 12 April 2026.

== Reception ==
Sarvam Maya received positive reviews from critics.

Sajin Shrijith of The Week gave 4/5 stars and wrote "The film marks the triumphant return of Nivin Pauly to his beloved charming persona in a feel-good fantasy directed by Akhil Sathyan, who presents a heartwarming 'ghost-as-angel' story, perfect for the holiday season" Gayathiri Krishna of OTTplay gave 3.5/5 stars and wrote "Nivin Pauly and Aju Varghese are portrayed in Akhil Sathyan's film in a way that appeals to Malayalis. Additionally, Riya Shibu is a real find." Janani K of India Today gave 3/5 stars and wrote "Sarvam Maya is a wholesome film with a lot of heart. The pace of the film may not be everyone's cup of tea, but Sarvam Maya is a film that deserves to receive as much love as it gives." Risha Ganguly of Times Now gave 3/5 stars and wrote "For viewers looking for a festive release that offers light chills, gentle laughs and introspection, Sarvam Maya proves to be a decent choice."

Onmanorama termed it a modest fantasy that relies on character dynamics and situational humour rather than melodrama. Zoom TV wrote that the film offers a restrained blend of belief and anxiety, focusing more on atmosphere and performances than conventional scares.

== Accolades ==
Award	Ceremony date	Category	Recipients	Result	Ref.
JFW Movie Awards	10 February 2026	Man of the Year	Nivin Pauly	Won	
Indian National Cine Academy Awards	15–16 April 2026	Best Actor - Malayalam	Nivin Pauly	Won	
Indian National Cine Academy Awards	15–16 April 2026	Best Debut Actress	Riya Shibu	Won	
Kerala Film Critics Association Awards	29 April 2026	Best Popular Film	Sarvam Maya	Won	
Kerala Film Critics Association Awards	29 April 2026	Best Newcomer Talents – Actress	Riya Shibu	Won	
14th South Indian International Movie Awards	13 September 2026	Best Film – Malayalam	Sarvam Maya	Won	
14th South Indian International Movie Awards	13 September 2026	Best Director – Malayalam	Akhil Sathyan	Nominated	
14th South Indian International Movie Awards	13 September 2026	Best Cinematographer – Malayalam	Sharan Velayudhan	Nominated	
14th South Indian International Movie Awards	13 September 2026	Best Actor – Malayalam	Nivin Pauly	Won	
14th South Indian International Movie Awards	13 September 2026	Best Actress – Malayalam	Riya Shibu	Nominated	
14th South Indian International Movie Awards	13 September 2026	Critics Award for Best Actress – Malayalam	Riya Shibu	Won	
14th South Indian International Movie Awards	13 September 2026	Best Comedian – Malayalam	Aju Varghese	Won	
14th South Indian International Movie Awards	13 September 2026	Best Debut Producer – Malayalam	Firefly Films	Nominated	
14th South Indian International Movie Awards	13 September 2026	Best Music Director – Malayalam	Justin Prabhakaran	Won	
14th South Indian International Movie Awards	13 September 2026	Best Male Playback Singer – Malayalam	Vineeth Sreenivasan	Nominated	
14th South Indian International Movie Awards	13 September 2026	Best Female Playback Singer – Malayalam	Shakthisree Gopalan	Won	
