= Saamy Square =

2018 film directed by Hari

- Theatrical release poster
- Directed by: Hari
- Written by: Hari
- Produced by: Shibu Thameens
- Starring: Vikram; Keerthy Suresh; Aishwarya Rajesh; Bobby Simha
- Cinematography: Venkatesh Anguraj
- Edited by: V. T. Vijayan; T. S. Jay
- Music by: Devi Sri Prasad
- Production company: Thameens Films
- Distributed by: Thameens Release
- Release date: 21 September 2018
- Running time: 174 minutes
- Country: India
- Language: Tamil

Saamy Square (stylised as Saamy²) is a 2018 Indian Tamil-language action film directed by Hari and produced by Sun pictures. The film, which is the sequel to Saamy, stars Vikram in a dual role as father and son, while Keerthy Suresh, Aishwarya Rajesh, Bobby Simha, Prabhu and Soori appear in supporting roles. The music was composed by Devi Sri Prasad.

Saamy Square was released on 21 September 2018 to mixed reviews from critics and become a box office failure.

== Plot ==
In India, Deputy Commissioner of Police (DCP) Aarusaamy was transferred out of Tirunelveli after killing corrupt politician Perumal Pichai. (Note: As depicted in Saamy (2003)) He lives happily with his pregnant wife Bhuvana in Palani. Bhuvana wants to become an IAS officer. However, when Perumal Pichai's men in Tirunelveli were talking about what had happened to him, they speculated he might be in Colombo with his second wife and three sons: Mahendra Pichai, the oldest; Devendra Pichai, the middle; and Raavana Pichai, the youngest. Raavana is crueller and more dangerous than his brothers. Saamy applied for a transfer to Tirunelveli to stop Raavana, which was approved.

28 years later, Ramasamy works for Viswanathan, the Union Home Minister, in New Delhi. He intends to pursue IAS as per the wishes of his maternal grandparents. Diya, Viswanathan's daughter, has just finished her studies and returned from London. When Raavana asks Viswanathan for the pending commission amount to be paid for transferring the party fund secretly, he replies merely to ask the party directly and not him. Irritated, Raavana kidnaps Diya for immediate settlement of payment. Ram rescues her from Raavana's goons and drops her off at home. Diya is impressed by his diplomatic nature and falls in love with him. Soon after, Ram accidentally seizes a van containing black money transferred by Raavana on a commission basis. He hands the money to the President of India without revealing his identity, which frustrates Raavana. Diya constantly proposes to Ram, which he rejects initially but gives in later.

Ram succeeds in the UPSC exam and leaves for Mussoorie for one-year training. After returning, his grandparents are shocked to see that he has opted for IPS and that he has been posted as a probationary Assistant Commissioner of Police in Tirunelveli. When Ram asks the reason for their reaction, his grandfather tells the truth: his father, Aarusaamy, was a Deputy Commissioner in Tirunelveli. Ram's grandfather begins to explain what happened 28 years ago. When Saamy and Bhuvana were on their way to Tirunelveli, they were hacked to death by the Pichai brothers to avenge their father's death. Ravana Pichai Kills Aarysaamy By Multiple Stabs And Slits Aarusaamy's Wife Bhuvana's Throat. But, Aarusaamy Wakes Up. Before dying, Saamy manages to open his dead wife's uterus and prematurely deliver his child (Ram). Bhuvana's parents take Ram and escape to Delhi, while a truck accident planned by Raavana kills the rest of their family.

Agitated after hearing about his tragic past, Ram decides to go to Tirunelveli and get justice for his parents' deaths. Ram's grandparents accept his decision, and he leaves for Tirunelveli and decides to take on the Pichai brothers. He initially warns Raavana and vows to bring the brothers before the law for killing his parents. Ram later razes Perumal's statue, which Raavana illegally placed at an intersection, causing traffic problems. A cat-and-mouse game ensues between Ram and Raavana, with both of them trying to get rid of each other. In response to the president's orders, Saamy is transferred to Tirunelveli, and Raavana is surprised that they could not transfer him elsewhere. Meanwhile, Viswanathan initially disapproves of Ram and Diya's love but later accepts it.

Ram kills Devendra and Mahendra after an accident caused by them in Devendra's cracker factory to prevent Ram from seizing illegal extortion money from Raavana, which kills many innocent workers, as well as a pregnant woman. Raavana's goons start to kill the people of Tirunelveli in revenge. Viswanathan decides to resign from politics because of the embarrassment faced. However, he is later killed in a train accident orchestrated by Raavana's henchmen. Later, Raavana absconds to Colombo on his mother's advice. Ram finds out that Raavana plans to go to Pakistan via Gujarat and Rajasthan, and he tracks him down. After a tiresome fight with desert bandits and Raavana, Ram subdues Raavana but decides to leave him to his fate in the middle of the Thar Desert with no man, town, village, or water source for several hundred kilometers.

As the credits roll, Ram lies to the media that Raavana left for Sri Lanka out of fear of being killed. Raavana dies after 17 days in the desert. Soon, Ram and Diya marry. The movie ends with the message, "Saamy's adventure will continue".

== Cast ==
- Vikram in a dual role as
  - ACP Ramasaamy Aarusaamy (A. Ramasaamy) IPS
  - DCP Aarusaamy Chockalingam (C. Aarusaamy) IPS, Ramasaamy's father
- Keerthy Suresh as Diya
- Aishwarya Rajesh as Bhuvana Aarusaamy ,Ramasaamy's mother
- Bobby Simha as Raavana Pichai, youngest among the Pichai brothers
- Prabhu as Union Minister G. Viswanathan, Diya's father
- Soori as Sakthi
- O. A. K. Sundar as Mahendra Pichai, eldest among the Pichai brothers
- John Vijay as Devendra Pichai, second among the Pichai brothers
- Ramesh Khanna as "Punctuality" Paramasivam
- Aishwariyaa Bhaskaran as Viswanathan's wife, Diya's mother
- Sudha Chandran as Perumal's second wife in Colombo, Sri Lanka
- Imman Annachi as SI Thangavelu
- Uma Riyaz Khan as CI Noorjahan
- Delhi Ganesh as Srinivasan Iyengar, Bhuvana's father and Ramasaamy's grandfather
- Sumitra as Janaki Iyengar, Bhuvana's mother and Ramasaamy's grandmother
- Sanjeev as Santhosh IPS, Ramsaamy's friend
- Thyagu as Aiyarettu Sundaram
- Bala Singh as Aatangkarai Shanmugam
- Crane Manohar as Aarusaamy's aide
- Pondy Ravi as Ravana's Personal Assistant
- Singamuthu as Brahmin
- Chaams as Sundaram
- Gunalan Morgan as Jayraj
- Mohammed Absar
- Praveena as Meenakshi (cameo appearance)
- Kota Srinivasa Rao as Perumal Pichai (flashback cameo)
- Vivek as Venkatrama Iyengar (portrait presence)
- Vijayakumar as Chockalingam, Aarusaamy's father and Ramasaamy's grandfather (Archival footage from previous film)

== Production ==
=== Development ===
In August 2016, during the audio launch of Iru Mugan, director Hari made an official announcement that he would unite with Vikram, also echoed by the latter, for a sequel to Saamy after 13 years being bankrolled by Shibu Thameens. The principal photography was expected to commence in late 2016 with Harris Jayaraj as music composer. During December 2016, Shibu Thameens confirmed that the plan for sequel was still on, putting an end to the rumours of the project being shelved, as director Hari and his team were involved in script development and would tentatively commence the principal photography in April 2017. In May 2017, it was officially announced that Devi Sri Prasad would be the composer, collaborating again with Vikram for the second time after Kanthasamy and Hari for the fifth time after Aaru, Venghai, Singam and Singam 2. In August 2017, it was reported that lyricist Viveka had joined the composer and director for a music composition session at Puducherry. Kanal Kannan and Silva were tasked with action choreography. Priyan, Hari's regular cinematographer, was selected as well, but later Venkatesh Anguraj became the cinematographer after Priyan died due to a heart attack in November 2017. The art direction was done by P. Shanmugam and P.V. Balaji, replacing K. Kadhir, who had collaborated with Hari in his previous films.

=== Casting ===
Apart from Vikram reprising his role, Keerthy Suresh was selected as the female lead. Prabhu and comedian Soori were added to cast along with Bobby Simha. Trisha was originally going to reprise her role as Bhuvana from the first film but opted out, citing "creative differences"; she was replaced by Aishwarya Rajesh. Vivek refused to reprise his role from the original film as he felt his character was not well developed in this film.

=== Filming ===
Despite the commencement of pre-production, the shooting was supposed to be commenced during June or July 2017 as quoted by the film producer. Various sources towards reported that the shoot would start towards the end of September 2017. Finally, the principal photography commenced in Chennai from 30 September 2017 onwards. The director also revealed that the film would be shot in Delhi, Gujarat,Rajasthan,Mussoorie and Nepal after shooting considerable portions in Chennai. In early October, the film's new title was revealed to be Saamy Square. By July 2018, filming was mostly complete except for a song sequence.

== Release ==
Saamy 2 was released on 21 September 2018.

=== Home media ===
The satellite and digital rights of the film were sold to Star Vijay and Disney+Hotstar. The film was dubbed and released in Hindi by Pen India Limited and was directly telecasted on Zee Cinema.

== Soundtrack ==
Saamy 2

Soundtrack album by Devi Sri Prasad
- Released: 23 July 2018
- Genre: Soundtrack
- Length: 21:53
- Language: Tamil
- Label: Sony Music
- Producer: Devi Sri Prasad

Devi Sri Prasad chronology
Bharat Ane Nenu (2018)	Saamy 2 (2018)	Hello Guru Prema Kosame (2018)

Singles from Saamy 2
- 1. "Adhiroobaney" Released: 10 July 2018; 2. "Molaga Podiye" Released: 18 July 2018

The music was composed by Devi Sri Prasad, who replaces the predecessor's music composer Harris Jayaraj. This film marks the Tamil comeback of Prasad after with Vikram a hiatus of nine years, whose previous Tamil film was Kanthaswamy (2009). Sony Music acquired the rights of the soundtrack for the film.

The first single, "Adhiroobaney," was released on 10 July 2018. The second single, "Molagapodiye," soon followed and released on 18 July 2018. The full soundtrack album was released on 23 July 2018.

All tracks are written by Viveka except where noted.

Track listing

No.	Title	Singer(s)	Length
1.	"Adhiroobaney"	M. M. Manasi	4:32
2.	"Molagapodiye"	Sanjith Hegde, Rita Thyagarajan	4:23
3.	"Darnakka"	Benny Dayal, Anthony Daasan	4:56
4.	"Hey Penney Onna Patha"	Vikram, Keerthy Suresh	4:18
5.	"Amma Amma"	Karthik	3:45
Total length:			21:53

== Reception ==
=== Critical response ===
Saamy 2 received negative reviews from critics with praise for Vikram's performance and action sequences, but criticized its plot, script, direction, music and humor.

M. Suganth of The Times of India gave 2/5 stars and wrote "The nods to the first film only makes the shortcomings much more obvious. But what is truly unforgivable is that it ruins our memories of the first film." Priyanka Sundar of Hindustan Times gave 2/5 stars and wrote "Vikram’s new film is exactly the same as Saamy with the only difference being how director Hari has presented the lead character."

Janani. K of India Today gave 2/5 stars and wrote "Saamy Square's premise had enough meat to qualify as a perfect commercial entertainer. But a sluggish first half and weak writing in parts make the film enjoyable only in certain places." Sowmya Rajendran of The News Minute wrote "The screenplay for 'Saamy Square' probably reads as an endless series of slaps." Srinivasa Ramanujam of The Hindu wrote "A loud, over-the-top revenge drama that is not a patch on part one."
