= Thugs (film) =

- Theatrical release poster
- Directed by: Brinda
- Written by: Shibu Thameens
- Produced by: Riya Shibu
- Starring: Hridhu Haroon; Anaswara Rajan; Bobby Simha; Munishkanth; R. K. Suresh
- Cinematography: Priyesh Gurusamy
- Edited by: Praveen Antony
- Music by: Sam C. S.
- Production company: HR Pictures
- Distributed by: Jio Studios
- Release date: 24 February 2023
- Running time: 160 minutes
- Country: India
- Language: Tamil

Kumari Maavattathin Thugs (transl. Kanyakumari district thugs), or simply Thugs, is a 2023 Indian Tamil-language action drama film directed by Brinda and starring Hridhu Haroon, Anaswara Rajan, Bobby Simha, Munishkanth and R. K. Suresh in the lead roles. It is a remake of the Malayalam film Swathanthryam Ardharathriyil (2018). It was released on 24 February 2023.

== Plot ==
Sethu Padmakumar is sentenced to imprisonment for second-degree murder in the district prison of Nagercoil. On his first day, he helps the prison guards foil an escape attempt by a group of inmates. Consequently, the head warden, Doss, favors him. However, he is constantly tormented by the gang whose plan he spoiled. He decides to escape.

Sethu shares his plan with his cellmate, Durai. Initially, Durai disagrees but later agrees after he finds out his wife is being preyed upon by random men at the marketplace where they work. Annachi's advocate questions Sethu about the location of his childhood friend called Charlie, but Sethu remains calm and says that he does not know anything. Durai asks Sethu about Annachi and Charlie, where Sethu reveals his story.

Sethu was responsible for bookkeeping for Annachi, the most powerful and dangerous crime lord in Nagercoil, while Charlie was Annachi's driver. Charlie was keen to take revenge on Annachi as he killed his father. During this time, Sethu met and fell in love with Kayal Sivakumar, who is an orphan, disabled, and speech-impaired. Meanwhile, one of Annachi's men kept harassing Kayal, but he was eventually arrested by the police. When he was released on bail, he tracked down Kayal and tried to attack her. Sethu tried to stop him and ended up killing him in a fit of rage. Sethu asked for help from Charlie, who promised to arrange for Sethu and Kayal to escape with him to Australia, but not before he robbed Annachi of all his black money and illegal documents. Charlie immediately left for Australia but promised Sethu that he would come back to take him and Kayal along with him. In the meantime, Sethu and Kayal fled to Kerala, where they somehow stayed hidden for days. On their way to collect passports, Kayal got involved in a protest and was admitted to the hospital, while Sethu got arrested and was sent back to Nagercoil to face imprisonment.

In the present day, Durai and Sethu plan to escape and successfully arrange for a group of fellow inmates to be placed in the same cell as them. However, when the guards find marijuana in Durai's cell, he is sent away to an even more secure prison. During this time, Sethu and the remaining inmates dig a hole through the toilet of their cell down the drainage and into the compound, where they start building the tunnel bit-by-bit. As the day of escape comes closer, the leader of the gang that tried to escape earlier is transferred to Sethu's cell, making their plan even more complicated.

To add to their mounting challenges, Annachi sends a new gang to the prison to torture Sethu so that he would reveal Charlie's whereabouts. Fortunately for Sethu, the gang is led by none other than Durai, who in turn helps Sethu and the other inmates. During the night of the escape, Sethu, Durai, and the other inmates start their escape down the tunnel. They are forced to bring the rival gang leader along with them by physically threatening him along the way.

In the tunnel, Sethu and the rival gang leader get into a fight, but Sethu successfully beats the gang leader and escapes. The guards are alerted, and the rival gang leader is caught and reveals that Sethu's gang is heading for the train station. They start chasing the other men who escaped. All of them escape by jumping into a river, except the twin brothers, one of whom is hit by a police jeep. Later, Sethu is reunited with Kayal at her convent. Together with Durai and his family, they escape to Sri Lanka where they will make arrangements to join Charlie in Australia.

During the credits, As for the twins, the escapes inmates arrange for them to make bail.

== Cast ==
- Hridhu Haroon as Sethu Padmakumar
- Anaswara Rajan as Kayal Sivakumar
- Bobby Simha as Durai
- Munishkanth as Marudhu
- R. K. Suresh as Doss
- Appani Sarath
- P. L. Thenappan as Annachi
- Saravana Bharathi as Kalaiyan
- Ramya Shekar
- Sooraj Pops

== Production ==
Hridhu Haroon, the son of producer Shibu Thameens, made his feature film debut through the project. A remake of the Malayalam film Swathanthryam Ardharathriyil (2018), the film's story was revealed to be based on a few gangsters from Kanyakumari, and was shot in Nagarkoil and Kochi in a single schedule. The film was dubbed into Telugu as Konaseema Thugs.

== Soundtrack ==
Soundtrack was composed by Sam C. S.

- Amman - Sam C. S.
- Ey Azhagiye - Kapil Kapilan, Chinmayi Sripaada

== Reception ==
The film was released on 24 February 2023 across Tamil Nadu. Logesh Balachandran from The Times of India noted it was "a well-made prison-break drama that engages you in parts". Navein Darshan from Cinema Express wrote it was "a fairly engaging retelling with invested performances". Dinamalar gave 2.5 rating out of 5. Hindu Tamil Thisai critic wrote that " Another feature that compensates for the pace of the screenplay is Praveen Anthony's cinematography".
