= Cup (film) =

2024 Malayalam-language sports drama film

- Directed by: Sanju V Samuel
- Written by: Sanju V Samuel; Akhilesh Latharaj; Denson Durom
- Produced by: Allwin Antony; Angelena Mary
- Starring: Mathew Thomas; Basil Joseph; Namitha Pramod; Riya Shibu; Anikha Surendran; Guru Somasundaram; Karthik Vishnu
- Cinematography: Nikhil S Praveen
- Edited by: Reckson Joseph
- Music by: Shaan Rahman
- Production company: Ananya Films
- Distributed by: Century Release
- Release date: 27 September 2024 (India)
- Country: India
- Language: Malayalam

Cup is a 2024 Indian Malayalam-language sports drama film directed by Sanju V Samuel. The film stars Mathew Thomas, Basil Joseph, Namitha Pramod, Riya Shibu, Anikha Surendran and Guru Somasundaram. The film is set against the backdrop of competitive badminton, and explores ambition, mentorship, and the pressures faced by young athletes. The film was released theatrically on 27 September 2024.

== Plot ==
Kannan is a determined young badminton player dreaming of representing India at the Olympics, and his aimless best friend Bineesh. As Kannan pushes toward his goal, Bineesh discovers purpose and grows into a hardworking young man.

== Cast ==
- Mathew Thomas as Nithin Babu (Kannan)
- Basil Joseph as Raneesh
- Guru Somasundaram as Babu
- Namitha Pramod as Coach SP Sandhya IPS
- Riya Shibu as Anna Kurien
- Anikha Surendran as Nithya Ramesh
- Karthik Vishnu as Bineesh (Thooval)
- Thushara Pillai as Rosly
- Mrinalini Susan George as Geethu
- Jude Anthany Joseph as Anil Antony
- Anand Roshan as Praveen
- Renjith Rajan as Kuttan
- Siddique as Director Siddique
- Althaf Manaf as Daanie
- Chembil Ashokan as Xaviour
- Santhosh Keezhattoor as Sub Inspector
- Vinod Thomas as Sura
- Nandini Gopalakrishnan as Anna's mother

== Production ==
Cup was produced by Allwin Antony and Angelena Mary under the banner of Ananya Films. The screenplay was written by Akhilesh Latharaj and Denson Durom. Principal photography took place in Kerala, with a focus on portraying badminton training and matches realistically.

== Release ==
The film was released theatrically across Kerala and other parts of India on 27 September 2024.

=== Home Media ===
The film’s post-theatrical streaming rights have been acquired by manoramaMAX. The film started streaming on 25 June 2026.

== Reception ==
Cup received mixed to negative reviews from critics. The Indian Express noted that while the film contained familiar elements of a sports drama, it lacked narrative depth. The New Indian Express described the film as a blend of sports drama and high school romance and commented on its uneven execution. Onmanorama highlighted the badminton setting and performances while pointing out weaknesses in the screenplay.
