= SIIMA Award for Best Actress – Malayalam =

List of winners and nominees of the SIIMA award

- The 2026 recipient: Kalyani Priyadarshan
- Awarded for: Best Performance by an Actress in a Leading Role in Malayalam cinema
- Country: India
- Presented by: Vibri Media Group
- First award: 21 June 2012 (for films released in 2011)
- Most recent winner: Kalyani Priyadarshan, Lokah Chapter 1: Chandra (2026)

Highlights
- Most nominations: Manju Warrier and Parvathy Thiruvothu (5)

The SIIMA Award for Best Actress – Malayalam is an award, begun in 2012, presented annually at the South Indian International Movie Awards to an actress in a leading role. The nominations for the category are given by the jury members. The first recipient of this award was Kavya Madhavan at the 1st South Indian International Movie Awards held on 22 June 2012 in Dubai.

== Superlatives ==
Categories	Actor	Record
Most wins	Amala Paul	2
Most wins	Nayanthara	2
Most wins	Manju Warrier	2
Most wins	Aishwarya Lekshmi	2
Most wins	Kalyani Priyadarshan	2
Most consecutive wins	Amala Paul	2 (2012–2013)
Most consecutive wins	Nayanthara	2 (2015–2016)
Most nominations	Manju Warrier	5
Most nominations	Parvathy Thiruvothu	5

=== Superlatives : Multiple Nominations ===
Nominations	Recipient(s)
5	Manju Warrier, Parvathy Thiruvothu
4	Nimisha Sajayan
3	Mamta Mohandas, Amala Paul, Aishwarya Lekshmi, Darshana Rajendran, Shobana, Kalyani Priyadarshan, Anaswara Rajan
2	Kavya Madhavan, Rima Kallingal, Revathi, Parvathy Thiruvothu, Anusree, Nayanthara, Anu Sithara, Rajisha Vijayan, Anna Ben, Nazriya Nazim

== Winners and nominees ==
=== 2010s ===
Year	Actress	Film	Ref.
2011 (1st)	Kavya Madhavan	Khaddama	
2012 (2nd)	Amala Paul	Run Baby Run	
2012 (2nd)	Rima Kallingal	22 Female Kottayam	
2012 (2nd)	Kavya Madhavan	Bavuttiyude Namathil	
2012 (2nd)	Shwetha Menon	Ithra Mathram	
2012 (2nd)	Revathi	Molly Aunty Rocks!	
2013 (3rd)	Amala Paul	Oru Indian Pranayakadha	
2013 (3rd)	Ann Augustine	Artist	
2013 (3rd)	Shobana	Thira	
2013 (3rd)	Meena	Drishyam	
2013 (3rd)	Rima Kallingal	August Club	
2014 (4th)	Manju Warrier	How Old Are You?	
2014 (4th)	Nazriya Nazim	Ohm Shanthi Oshaana	
2014 (4th)	Aparna Gopinath	Munnariyippu	
2014 (4th)	Namitha Pramod	Vikramadithyan	
2014 (4th)	Anusree	Ithihasa	
2015 (5th)	Nayanthara	Bhaskar the Rascal	
2015 (5th)	Parvathy Thiruvothu	Ennu Ninte Moideen	
2015 (5th)	Amala Paul	Mili	
2015 (5th)	Anusree	Chandrettan Evideya	
2015 (5th)	Mamta Mohandas	Two Countries	
|2016 (6th)	Nayanthara	Puthiya Niyamam	
|2016 (6th)	Asha Sarath	Anuraga Karikkin Vellam	
|2016 (6th)	Manju Warrier	Vettah	
|2016 (6th)	Sai Pallavi	Kali	
|2016 (6th)	Vedhika	James & Alice	
2017 (7th)	Parvathy Thiruvothu	Take Off	
2017 (7th)	Aishwarya Lekshmi	Mayaanadhi	
2017 (7th)	Manju Warrier	Udaharanam Sujatha	
2017 (7th)	Nimisha Sajayan	Thondimuthalum Driksakshiyum	
2017 (7th)	Anu Sithara	Ramante Edanthottam	
2018 (8th)	Aishwarya Lekshmi	Varathan	
2018 (8th)	Anu Sithara	Captain	
2018 (8th)	Nikhila Vimal	Aravindante Athidhikal	
2018 (8th)	Trisha Krishnan	Hey Jude	
2018 (8th)	Nimisha Sajayan	Eeda	
2019 (9th)	Manju Warrier	Lucifer and Prathi Poovankozhi	
2019 (9th)	Parvathy Thiruvothu	Uyare	
2019 (9th)	Rajisha Vijayan	June	
2019 (9th)	Nimisha Sajayan	Chola	
2019 (9th)	Anna Ben	Helen	

=== 2020s ===
Year	Actress	Film	Ref.
2020 (9th)	Shobana	Varane Avashyamund	
2020 (9th)	Anna Ben	Kappela	
2020 (9th)	Mamta Mohandas	Forensic	
2020 (9th)	Darshana Rajendran	C U Soon	
2020 (9th)	Anupama Parameswaran	Maniyarayile Ashokan	
2021 (10th)	Aishwarya Lekshmi	Kaanekkaane	
2021 (10th)	Parvathy Thiruvothu	Aarkkariyam	
2021 (10th)	Rajisha Vijayan	Love	
2021 (10th)	Mamta Mohandas	Bhramam	
2021 (10th)	Sobhita Dhulipala	Kurup	
2021 (10th)	Nimisha Sajayan	The Great Indian Kitchen	
2022 (11th)	Kalyani Priyadarshan	Bro Daddy	
2022 (11th)	Anaswara Rajan	Super Sharanya	
2022 (11th)	Darshana Rajendran	Jaya Jaya Jaya Jaya Hey	
2022 (11th)	Revathi	Bhoothakaalam	
2022 (11th)	Keerthy Suresh	Vaashi	
2022 (11th)	Navya Nair	Oruthee	
2023 (12th)	Anaswara Rajan	Neru	
2023 (12th)	Kalyani Priyadarshan	Sesham Mike-il Fathima	
2023 (12th)	Darshana Rajendran	Purusha Pretham	
2023 (12th)	Jyothika	Kaathal – The Core	
2023 (12th)	Manju Warrier	Ayisha	
2023 (12th)	Vincy Aloshious	Rekha	
2024 (13th)	Urvashi	Ullozhukku	
2024 (13th)	Jyothirmayi	Bougainvillea	
2024 (13th)	Mamitha Baiju	Premalu	
2024 (13th)	Nazriya Nazim	Sookshmadarshini	
2024 (13th)	Parvathy Thiruvothu	Ullozhukku	
2024 (13th)	Zarin Shihab	Aattam	
2025 (14th)	Kalyani Priyadarshan	Lokah Chapter 1: Chandra	
2025 (14th)	Anaswara Rajan	Rekhachithram	
2025 (14th)	Lijomol Jose	Ponman	
2025 (14th)	Riya Shibu	Sarvam Maya	
2025 (14th)	Shobana	Thudarum	
2025 (14th)	Shamla Hamza	Feminichi Fathima	

== See also ==
- SIIMA Critics Award for Best Actress – Malayalam
