= SIIMA Critics Award for Best Actress – Malayalam =

Malayalam-language media award

- Awarded for: Best Performance by an Actress in a Leading Role in Malayalam cinema
- Country: India
- Presented by: Vibri Media Group
- First award: 22 June 2012 (for films released in 2011)
- Most recent winner: Riya Shibu, Sarvam Maya (2025)

Highlights
- Most wins: Nimisha Sajayan and Parvathy Thiruvothu (2)

SIIMA Critics Award for Best Actress – Malayalam is presented by Vibri media group as part of its annual South Indian International Movie Awards, for best acting done by an actress in Malayalam films, who are selected by the jury. The award was first given in 2012 for films released in 2011.

== Superlatives ==
- Nimisha Sajayan and Parvathy Thiruvothu have won the most awards with two wins.
- Parvathy and Aishwarya Lekshmi have also won the SIIMA Award for Best Actress – Malayalam.

== Winners ==
| Year | Actress | Film | Ref. |
|---|---|---|---|
| 2011 | Shwetha Menon | Rathinirvedam | |
| 2012 | Rima Kallingal | 22 Female Kottayam | |
| 2013 | Ann Augustine | Artist | |
| 2014 | Anusree | Ithihasa | |
| 2015 | Parvathy Thiruvothu | Ennu Ninte Moideen | |
| 2016 | Asha Sharath | Anuraga Karikkin Vellam | |
| 2017 | Aishwarya Lekshmi | Mayanadhi | |
| 2018 | Trisha | Hey Jude | |
| 2019 | Nimisha Sajayan | Chola | |
| 2020 | Anna Ben | Kappela | |
| 2021 | Nimisha Sajayan | The Great Indian Kitchen | |
| 2022 | Darshana Rajendran | Jaya Jaya Jaya Jaya Hey | |
| 2023 | Jyothika | Kaathal – The Core | |
| 2024 | Parvathy Thiruvothu | Ullozhukku | |
| 2025 | Riya Shibu | Sarvam Maya | |

== See also ==
- SIIMA Award for Best Actress – Malayalam
