= All We Imagine as Light =

2024 film by Payal Kapadia

- International release poster
- Malayalam: പ്രഭയായ് നിനച്ചതെല്ലം
- Directed by: Payal Kapadia
- Written by: Payal Kapadia
- Produced by: Thomas Hakim; Julien Graff
- Starring: Kani Kusruti; Divya Prabha; Chhaya Kadam; Hridhu Haroon
- Cinematography: Ranabir Das
- Edited by: Clément Pinteaux
- Music by: Topshe; Emahoy Tsegué-Maryam Guèbrou
- Production companies: Petit Chaos; Chalk & Cheese Films; BALDR Film; Les Films Fauves; Another Birth; Pulpa Films; Arte France Cinéma
- Distributed by: Condor Distribution (France); Spirit Media (India); September Film (Netherlands)
- Release dates: 23 May 2024 (Cannes); 21 September 2024 (India); 2 October 2024 (France)
- Running time: 115 minutes
- Countries: France; India; Netherlands; Luxembourg; Italy
- Languages: Malayalam; Hindi; Marathi
- Box office: $3.4 million

All We Imagine as Light (Malayalam: പ്രഭയായ് നിനച്ചതെല്ലാം, romanized: Prabhayaay Ninachathellam) is a 2024 drama film written and directed by Payal Kapadia. The cast includes Kani Kusruti, Divya Prabha, Chhaya Kadam, and Hridhu Haroon. Primarily in Malayalam, the film also features dialogue in Hindi and Marathi. It is an international co-production involving companies from France, India, the Netherlands, Luxembourg, and Italy.

The film premiered in the main competition of the 77th Cannes Film Festival on 23 May 2024, where it was nominated for the Palme d'Or and won the Grand Prix. It was the first film from India to compete in the main competition since Swaham in 1994.

It received a limited release in Kerala, India, on 21 September 2024, before opening nationwide on 29 November 2024 to positive reviews. It topped the Sight & Sound poll for best film of 2024 and was named one of the top five international films of 2024 by the National Board of Review. At the 82nd Golden Globe Awards, the film received two nominations, for Best Foreign Language Film and Best Director. It was also nominated for the BAFTA Award for Best Film Not in the English Language.

== Plot ==
Malayalis Prabha and Anu are nurses living together in Mumbai. Prabha is straitlaced and reserved, and yearns for her husband, who lives in Germany and visited India only once for a short arranged marriage, but has not contacted her in over a year. Anu is more outgoing and is having a secret affair with a Muslim man named Shiaz.

One day, Prabha and Anu receive a modern rice cooker from an unknown sender; the cooker is made in Germany. A doctor, Manoj, tries to woo Prabha, but she rejects his advances, claiming her marital status.

Prabha tries to help Parvaty, the cook at their hospital, fight against a construction company which wants to demolish her chawl to build a skyscraper. Unable to claim legal tenancy, Parvaty decides to quit her job and move back to her village near Ratnagiri. Prabha and Anu travel with her, to help her relocate.

Unbeknownst to Prabha and Parvaty, Shiaz has followed Anu. Then they meet and secretly come together in a private place. He kisses her lips and neck. Anu feels shy, with a tingling sensation running through her. In that impulse, she kisses him intensely, and they engage in sexual intimacy.

They secretly meet up, which Prabha discovers. Later, they have sex. Meanwhile, Prabha rescues a middle-aged man from drowning by performing CPR. While he is waiting for the local doctor, Prabha cleans and cares for him. She sees the man she rescued as her husband. He apologises for abandoning her and seeks her forgiveness, but she tells him that she does not want to see him ever again.

That night, at a beach shack, Prabha asks a surprised Anu to invite Shiaz to sit with herself and Parvaty. They all chat happily, as the lights of the shack shine over them.

== Cast ==
- Kani Kusruti as Prabha
- Divya Prabha as Anu
- Chhaya Kadam as Parvathy
- Hridhu Haroon as Shiaz
- Azees Nedumangad as Dr. Manoj
- Anandsami as Drowned Man / Husband
- Kashish Singh as Young Nurse
- Lovleen Mishra as Dr. Supriya
- Madhu Raja as Kaki

== Production ==
The film was produced by Thomas Hakim and Julian Graff through their French-based company Petit Chaos, in co-production with the Indian companies Chalk & Cheese and Another Birth, as well as by the Netherlands's BALDR Film, Luxembourg's Les Films Fauves, Italy's Pulpa Films and France's Arte France Cinéma. Hakim first met Kapadia at the 68th Berlin International Film Festival in 2018. This was the first feature film produced by Chalk & Cheese, which previously produced commercials for nine years.

Kapadia used money from the Huub Bals grant and Cinéfondation to reside in Europe in order to plan the film production with Hakim. Financing for the film was obtained from Arte, Cineworld, CNC, Condor, Eurimages, Gan Foundation, Hubert Bals Fund, Luxbox, Pulpa Film, and Visions Sud Est.

Filming was done in Mumbai over the course of twenty-five days and then in Ratnagiri for fifteen days.

== Release ==
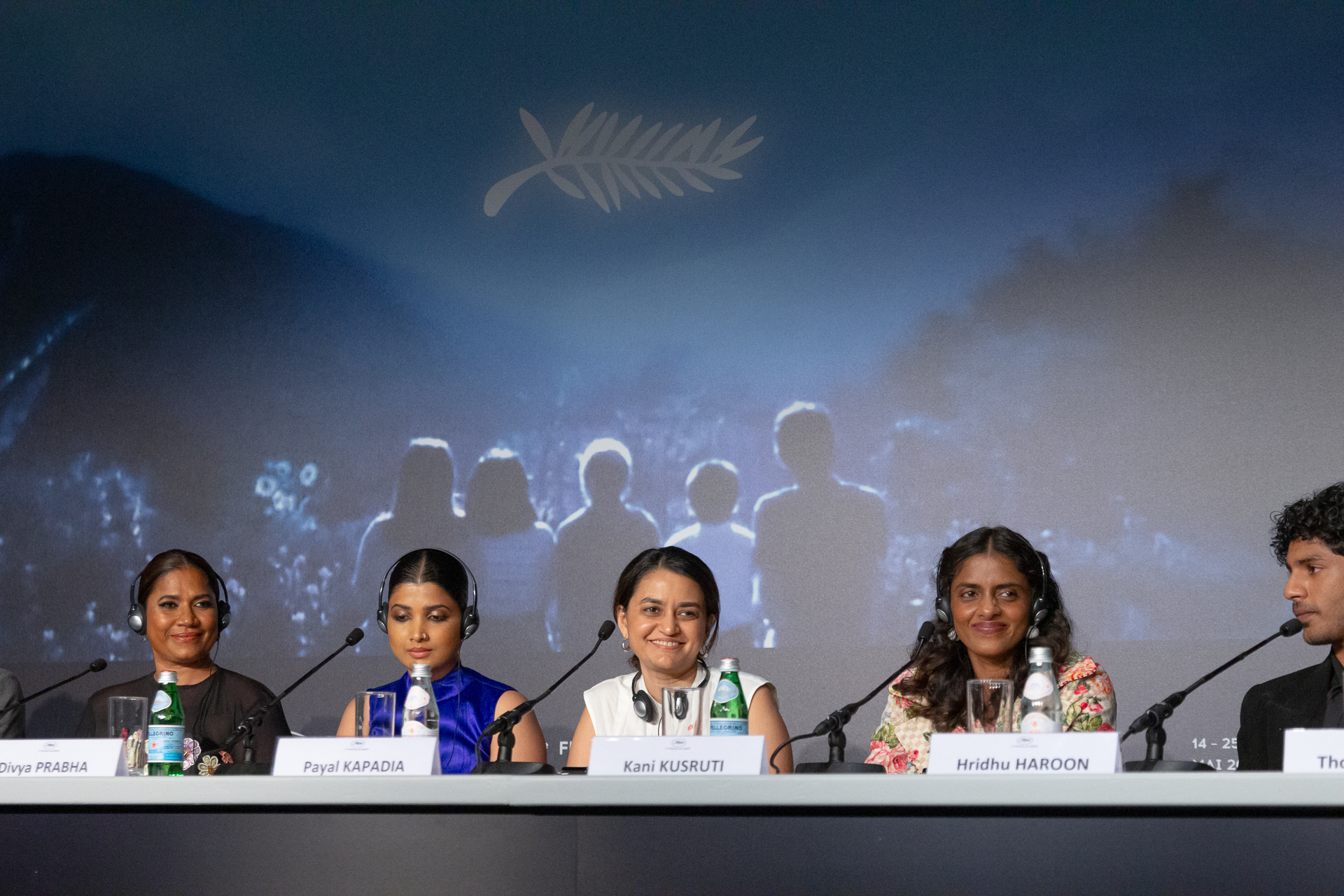
Actresses Chhaya Kadam, Divya Prabha, director Payal Kapadia, actress Kani Kusruti, and actor Hridhu Haroon at a press conference at 2024 Cannes Film Festival

All We Imagine as Light was selected to compete for the Palme d'Or at the 2024 Cannes Film Festival, where it had its world premiere on 23 May, and received an eight-minute standing ovation at the end of its screening. This is the first film from India to compete in the main competition at Cannes since Swaham in 1994, and Kapadia is the first Indian female filmmaker to do so. It won the Grand Prix, becoming the first Indian film to do so.

On 9 September 2024, it was announced that Spirit Media, founded by Indian actor Rana Daggubati, had acquired Indian distribution rights to the film. Spirit Media announced that the film would begin its Oscar-qualifying release with a limited theatrical release in Kerala starting on 21 September under the Malayalam title 'പ്രഭയായ് നിനച്ചതെല്ലാം' i.e. Prabhayay Ninachathellam.

The film was selected as the opening film for the MAMI Mumbai Film Festival 2024, and was released theatrically in India on 22 November 2024.

Janus Films and distribution partner Sideshow acquired the North American rights for the film on 20 May 2024, and released the film on 15 November 2024 in New York and Los Angeles, with a nationwide expansion following its opening. The film was also played at the Toronto International Film Festival on 5 September 2024. It was released in France by Condor Distribution on 2 October 2024. It was featured in the accolades section of the 55th IFFI, and Limelight section of the 54th International Film Festival Rotterdam screened on 30 January 2025. The film made its digital release through Disney+ Hotstar from 3 January 2025.

== Reception ==
=== Critical response ===
On the review aggregator website Rotten Tomatoes, 100% of 158 critics' reviews are positive, with an average rating of 8.6/10. The website's consensus reads: "Capturing the here and now of modern India with the spontaneity of a candid photograph, All We Imagine as Light is a lustrous achievement that announces Payal Kapadia as an essential filmmaker." Metacritic, which uses a weighted average, assigned the film a score of 93 out of 100, based on 35 critics, indicating "universal acclaim". On AlloCiné, the film received an average rating of 3.8 out of 5, based on 31 reviews from French critics.

Peter Bradshaw, writing in The Guardian, gave the film five stars and praised it as an "absorbing story of three nurses that is full of humanity". Nicholas Barber, writing in the BBC, also gave the film five stars. Filmmakers Miguel Gomes, Ciro Guerra, Don Hertzfeldt, Raven Jackson, Karyn Kusama, Laura Poitras and Walter Salles cited the film among their favorite films of 2024.

The film was ranked 5th among the top 25 European works of 2024 by the journalists at Cineuropa. In June 2025, IndieWire ranked the film at number 58 on its list of "The 100 Best Movies of the 2020s (So Far)." The British film magazine Sight & Sound named it the best film of 2024 in its poll of over 100 critics worldwide. It was also ranked 1st in the Best Movies of 2024 list from The New York Times, with Manohla Dargis writing that Kapadia "incorporates images of everyday people milling through the city, images that connect her characters to a sea of humanity and, by extension, to those of us watching."

=== Academy Awards selection controversy ===
For the 97th Academy Awards, All We Imagine As Light was not selected to be submitted by either France or India, with the former submitting Emilia Pérez, and the latter submitting Laapataa Ladies. The film had been shortlisted for France's submission. The Film Federation of India's (FFI) decision to not submit the film was unexpected, with NPR's Diaa Hadid remarking that the film's international reception had "garnered raised hopes that India might finally have a serious contender for an Oscar in the best foreign film category". Many like Naman Ramachandran of Variety drew comparisons to India's decision to not select The Lunchbox (2013) and RRR (2022) for its Academy Awards submissions, particularly in light of the film's success at the Cannes Film Festival with it having won the Grand Prix.

At the initial news announcing the selection of Laapataa Ladies, FFI president Ravi Kottarakara explained All That We Imagine As Light's exclusion, saying "The jury said that they were watching a European film taking place in India, not an Indian film taking place in India." Justifying its selection, the FFI noted on Laapataa Ladies, "Indian women are a strange mixture of submission and dominance. Well-defined, powerful characters in one world, a Laapataa Ladies (Hindi) captures this diversity perfectly, though in a semi-idyllic world and in a tongue-in-cheek way." Kapadia responded to the controversy by expressing her appreciation for Kiran Rao's works, saying to Indiewire "I just think it’s really great that there are two films from India that are doing this well, and they’re both by women."

On December 17, the Academy of Motion Pictures, Arts and Sciences released its shortlist for a variety of categories, including best International Feature Film, and India's selection (Laapataa Ladies) was not selected, triggering a renewed discussion on the decision to "snub" the film. Industry figures like director Hansal Mehta and Ricky Kej publicly voiced their discontent with the FFI's decision to not send All We Imagine As Light, with the former sarcastically remarking "Film Federation of India does it again! Their strike rate and selection of films year after year is impeccable."

In light of the renewed controversy following the release of the Academy Award shortlist, Jahnu Barua, the head of the 13-member all-male jury remarked to the Hindustan Times that people ought to be "respectful of the process". Elaborating on the decision to not consider All That We Imagine As Light, Barua said "The jury felt that her film was very poor technically."

=== Accolades ===
Award	Date of ceremony	Category	Recipient(s)	Result	Ref.
Cannes Film Festival	25 May 2024	Palme d'Or	Payal Kapadia	Nominated	
Cannes Film Festival	25 May 2024	Grand Prix	Payal Kapadia	Won	
Cannes Film Festival	25 May 2024	Prix des Cinémas Art et Essai – Special Mention	Payal Kapadia	Won	
Sydney Film Festival	16 June 2024	Best Film	All We Imagine as Light	Nominated	
Munich International Film Festival	6 July 2024	Best International Film	All We Imagine as Light	Nominated	
Jerusalem Film Festival	25 July 2024	International Competition	All We Imagine as Light	Nominated	
San Sebastián International Film Festival	28 September 2024	RTVE-Another Look Award	All We Imagine as Light	Won	
Chicago International Film Festival	27 October 2024	Gold Hugo	All We Imagine as Light	Nominated	
Chicago International Film Festival	27 October 2024	Silver Hugo – Jury Prize	All We Imagine as Light	Won	
Montclair Film Festival	28 October 2024	Fiction Feature Prize	All We Imagine as Light	Won	
Cahiers du Cinéma	2024	Annual Top 10	All We Imagine as Light	5th Place	
Kyiv International Film Festival "Molodist"	2 November 2024	Best Full Length Film	All We Imagine as Light	Won	
Asia Pacific Screen Awards	30 November 2024	Best Film	Thomas Hakim, Julien Graff, Payal Kapadia	Nominated	
Asia Pacific Screen Awards	30 November 2024	Best Director	Payal Kapadia	Nominated	
Asia Pacific Screen Awards	30 November 2024	Best Screenplay	Payal Kapadia	Nominated	
Asia Pacific Screen Awards	30 November 2024	Best Performance	Kani Kusruti	Nominated	
Asia Pacific Screen Awards	30 November 2024	Best Cinematography	Ranabir Das	Nominated	
Asia Pacific Screen Awards	30 November 2024	Jury Grand Prize	All We Imagine as Light	Won	
Gotham Awards	2 December 2024	Best Director	Payal Kapadia	Nominated	
Gotham Awards	2 December 2024	Best International Feature	Payal Kapadia, Thomas Hakim, Julien Graff	Won	
New York Film Critics Circle	3 December 2024	Best International Film	All We Imagine as Light	Won	
National Board of Review	4 December 2024	Top Five International Films	All We Imagine as Light	Won (Note: This award does not have a single winner, but recognizes multiple films.)	
British Independent Film Awards	8 December 2024	Best International Independent Film	Payal Kapadia, Thomas Hakim, Julien Graff	Nominated	
Astra Film Awards	8 December 2024	Best International Feature	All We Imagine as Light	Nominated	
Los Angeles Film Critics Association	8 December 2024	Best Foreign Language Film	All We Imagine as Light	Won	
San Diego Film Critics Society	9 December 2024	Best Foreign Language Film	All We Imagine as Light	Won	
Chicago Film Critics Association	11 December 2024	Milos Stehlik Award for Breakthrough Filmmaker	Payal Kapadia	Nominated	
Chicago Film Critics Association	11 December 2024	Best Foreign Language Film	All We Imagine as Light	Won	
Film Comment Magazine	12 December 2024	Best Film	All We Imagine as Light	Won	
Phoenix Critics Circle	13 December 2024	Best Foreign Language Film	All We Imagine as Light	Won	
St. Louis Film Critics Association	15 December 2024	Best International Feature Film	All We Imagine as Light	Nominated	
San Francisco Bay Area Film Critics Circle	15 December 2024	Best International Feature Film	All We Imagine as Light	Nominated	
Toronto Film Critics Association	15 December 2024	Best Director	Payal Kapadia	Runner-up	
Toronto Film Critics Association	15 December 2024	Best Original Screenplay	Payal Kapadia	Won	
Toronto Film Critics Association	15 December 2024	Best International Feature	All We Imagine as Light	Won	
New York Film Critics Online	16 December 2024	Best International Feature	All We Imagine as Light	Won	
Indiana Film Journalists Association	16 December 2024	Best Foreign Language Film	All We Imagine as Light	Nominated	
Dallas–Fort Worth Film Critics Association	18 December 2024	Best Foreign Language Film	All We Imagine as Light	3rd place	
Dublin Film Critics' Circle	19 December 2024	Best Film	All We Imagine as Light	Nominated	
Black Film Critics Circle	19 December 2024	Best Foreign Film	All We Imagine as Light	Won	
Philadelphia Film Critics Circle	21 December 2024	Best Foreign Film	All We Imagine as Light	Won	
Florida Film Critics Circle	21 December 2024	Best International Film	All We Imagine as Light	Won	
Florida Film Critics Circle	21 December 2024	Best Ensemble	All We Imagine as Light	Nominated	
Florida Film Critics Circle	21 December 2024	Best Director	Payal Kapadia	Nominated	
Online Association of Female Film Critics	23 December 2024	Best International Feature	All We Imagine as Light	Won	
North Texas Film Critics Association	30 December 2024	Best Foreign Language Film	All We Imagine as Light	Nominated	
Columbus Film Critics Association	2 January 2025	Best Foreign Language Film	All We Imagine as Light	Runner-up	
North Carolina Film Critics Association	3 January 2025	Best Foreign Language Film	All We Imagine as Light	Won	
Kansas City Film Critics Circle	4 January 2025	Best Foreign Language Film	All We Imagine as Light	Nominated	
DiscussingFilm Critic Awards	4 January 2025	Best International Feature Film	All We Imagine as Light	Runner-up	
Greater Western New York Film Critics Association	4 January 2025	Best Foreign Language Film	All We Imagine as Light	Nominated	
National Society of Film Critics	4 January 2025	Best Film	All We Imagine as Light	Runner-up	
National Society of Film Critics	4 January 2025	Best Film Not In English Language	All We Imagine as Light	Won	
National Society of Film Critics	4 January 2025	Best Director	Payal Kapadia	Won	
Golden Globe Awards	5 January 2025	Best Foreign Language Film	All We Imagine as Light	Nominated	
Golden Globe Awards	5 January 2025	Best Director	Payal Kapadia	Nominated	
Georgia Film Critics Association	7 January 2025	Best International Film	All We Imagine as Light	Runner-up	
Alliance of Women Film Journalists	7 January 2025	Best International Film	All We Imagine as Light	Nominated	
Alliance of Women Film Journalists	7 January 2025	Best Director	Payal Kapadia	Nominated	
Alliance of Women Film Journalists	7 January 2025	Best Original Screenplay	Payal Kapadia	Nominated	
Alliance of Women Film Journalists	7 January 2025	Best Woman Director	Payal Kapadia	Won	
Alliance of Women Film Journalists	7 January 2025	Best Woman Screenwriter	Payal Kapadia	Won	
Utah Film Critics Association	11 January 2025	Best Non-English Feature	All We Imagine as Light	Nominated	
Puerto Rico Critics Association	12 January 2025	Best Director	Payal Kapadia	Nominated	
Puerto Rico Critics Association	12 January 2025	Best International Feature	All We Imagine as Light	Nominated	
Hawaii Film Critics Society	13 January 2025	Best Foreign Language Film	All We Imagine as Light	Nominated	
North Dakota Film Society Awards	13 January 2025	Best International Feature	All We Imagine as Light	Nominated	
Houston Film Critics Society	14 January 2025	Best Foreign Language Feature	All We Imagine as Light	Nominated	
Portland Critics Association	14 January 2025	Best Film Not in the English Language	All We Imagine as Light	Nominated	
Women Film Critics Circle	15 January 2025	Best Movie About Women	All We Imagine as Light	Nominated	
Women Film Critics Circle	15 January 2025	Best Foreign Film By Or About Women	All We Imagine as Light	Nominated	
Women Film Critics Circle	15 January 2025	Best Movie By Women (Directing)	Payal Kapadia	Nominated	
Women Film Critics Circle	15 January 2025	Best Women Storyteller ( Screenwriting Award)	Payal Kapadia	Runner-up	
Chicago Indie Critics	18 January 2025	Best International Film	All We Imagine as Light	Nominated	
Lumière Awards	20 January 2025	Best Film	All We Imagine as Light	Nominated	
Denver Film Critics Society	24 January 2025	Best Non-English Language Feature	All We Imagine as Light	Won	
Girls on Film Awards	26 January 2025	Best Feature Film	All We Imagine as Light	Nominated	
Girls on Film Awards	26 January 2025	Best Female Friendship on Screen	All We Imagine as Light	Won	
Girls on Film Awards	26 January 2025	Ensemble Cast Award	All We Imagine as Light	Nominated	
Online Film Critics Society	27 January 2025	Best Film Not in the English Language	All We Imagine as Light	Won	
Göteborg Film Festival	29 January 2025	International Competition	All We Imagine as Light	Nominated	
London Film Critics' Circle	2 February 2025	Film of the Year	All We Imagine as Light	Nominated	
London Film Critics' Circle	2 February 2025	Foreign Language Film of the Year	All We Imagine as Light	Won	
Critics' Choice Movie Awards	7 February 2025	Best Foreign Language Film	All We Imagine as Light	Nominated	
Directors Guild of America Awards	8 February 2025	Outstanding Directing – First-Time Feature Film	Payal Kapadia	Nominated	
International Cinephile Society	9 February 2025	Best Picture	All We Imagine as Light	Won	
International Cinephile Society	9 February 2025	Best Ensemble	All We Imagine as Light	Won	
International Cinephile Society	9 February 2025	Best Director	Payal Kapadia	Won	
International Cinephile Society	9 February 2025	Best Original Screenplay	Payal Kapadia	Runner-up	
International Cinephile Society	9 February 2025	Best Actress	Kani Kusruti	Nominated	
International Cinephile Society	9 February 2025	Best Supporting Actress	Chhaya Kadam	Nominated	
International Cinephile Society	9 February 2025	Best Supporting Actress	Divya Prabha	Nominated	
International Cinephile Society	9 February 2025	Best Cinematography	Ranabir Das	Nominated	
International Cinephile Society	9 February 2025	Best Editing	Clément Pinteaux	Nominated	
Dorian Awards	13 February 2025	Non English Film Of The Year	All We Imagine as Light	Nominated	
British Academy Film Awards	16 February 2025	Best Film Not in the English Language	All We Imagine as Light	Nominated	
Vancouver Film Critics Circle	19 February 2025	Best International Film in Non-English Language	All We Imagine as Light	Nominated	
Independent Spirit Awards	22 February 2025	Best International Film	All We Imagine as Light	Nominated	
Online Film & Television Association	23 February 2025	Best Foreign Language Film	All We Imagine as Light	Runner-up	
VHS Awards	February 2025	Best Film	All We Imagine as Light	Nominated	
VHS Awards	February 2025	Best Director	Payal Kapadia	2nd Place	
VHS Awards	February 2025	Best Original Screenplay	Payal Kapadia	Won	
VHS Awards	February 2025	Best Actress	Kani Kusruti	Nominated	
VHS Awards	February 2025	Best Supporting Actress	Divya Prabha	Nominated	
Asian Film Awards	16 March 2025	Best Film	All We Imagine as Light	Won	
Asian Film Awards	16 March 2025	Best Director	Payal Kapadia	Nominated	
Asian Film Awards	16 March 2025	Best Screenplay	Payal Kapadia	Nominated	
Asian Film Awards	16 March 2025	Best Actress	Kani Kusruti	Nominated	
Asian Film Awards	16 March 2025	Best Supporting Actress	Divya Prabha	Nominated	
Asian Film Awards	16 March 2025	Best Editing	Clément Pinteaux	Nominated	
