= Maine Pyar Kiya (2025 film) =

2025 Indian film by Faizal Faziludeen

- Theatrical release poster
- Directed by: Faizal Faziludeen
- Written by: Faizal Faziludeen; Blk Fzl
- Produced by: Sanju Unnithan
- Starring: Hridhu Haroon; Preity Mukhundhan
- Cinematography: Don Paul P.
- Edited by: Kannan Mohan
- Music by: Songs: Electronic Kili; Background Score: Vijay Anand
- Production company: Spire Productions
- Distributed by: Spire Productions
- Release date: 29 August 2025
- Running time: 148 minutes
- Country: India
- Language: Malayalam

Maine Pyar Kiya (transl. I've fallen in love) is a 2025 Indian Malayalam-language romantic action thriller film written and directed by Faizal Faziludeen. It is co-written by Blk Fzl. The film stars Hridhu Haroon and Preity Mukhundhan (in her Malayalam debut) in the lead roles. It is produced by Sanju Unnithan under the banner Spire Productions. Don Paul P. handled the cinematography and Kannan Mohan editd the film. Electronic Kili composed the songs and Mihraj Khalid and Vijay Anand composed the background score. The film was released on 29 August 2025.

== Plot ==
Aryan is an unemployed clumsy boy in Unnikulam, whose main job is to hang out and play football with his childhood friends Nixon, Shine and Niju. One day, when he goes to his former college to receive his certificates along with Niju, he encounters Nidhi, a conservative Tamil girl coming from a politically affluent family, whom he started to fall in love. Nidhi's life is miserable due to her toxic parents' domination on her, and she is living her life in her parents' choice rather than in her self choices. Aryan started stalking her. Initially Nidhi tries her best to avoid him, but later, she befriend him. The film follows how an incident change their life and they gets involved in a Kerala-Tamil Nadu smuggling syndicate's bloody dispute over reptile smuggling. And at the same time, Nidhi is taken by her parent to Madurai, prompting Aryan encouraged by his loyal group of friends to travel to the streets of Madurai in search of her. As Aryan navigates local politics and clashes with ruthless gangsters including Maari, his simple quest for love turns into a desperate fight for survival. With help from his friends and a hitman named Danny, Aryan manages to navigate the chaos and get Nidhi to safety, and now Nidhi is safe from both the gangsters and her toxic parents. Years later, at a dance party, Aryan asks Nidhi directly if she ever loved him. Aryan and Nidhi survives, Aryan is forced to make a major personal sacrifice in the name of selfless love to Nidhi, were she tells him "no". Having spent her life controlled by her family and dragged into danger by Aryan's obsession, she explains that while he became a major part of her journey, her own life and independence matter more to her than his love. Aryan accepts her decision and resolves to move forward and take his own life and responsibilities seriously. In the climax, Aryan is forced to make a major personal sacrifice in the name of selfless love to ensure Nidhi's safety, make both Aryan and Nidhi separated.

== Cast ==
- Hridhu Haroon as Aryan
- Preity Mukhundhan as Nidhi
- Askar Ali as Nixon
- Midhutty as Niju
- Arjun Sundharesan as Shine
- Jeo Baby as Aryan's father
- Sreekanth Vettiyar as Aryan's friend
- Thrikkannan
- Bibin Perumbilli
- Abhimanyu Sajeev as Maari
- Redin Kingsley as a member of Rowdy gang
- Mime Gopi
- Sai Dheena as a member of Rowdy gang
- Jagadeesh Janardhan
- Jivin Rexa
- Prince
- Rishad as Sathyaprakash
- Antony Varghese as Danny (cameo appearance)

== Production ==
Principal photography began on 15 November 2024 at Changanassery. The first schedule completed on 14 December 2024. The second schedule began by the end of December 2024 at Madurai. The filming wrapped on 15 January 2025. The teaser released on August 5th, 2025 on YouTube and the film got U/A certificate from Central Board of Film Certification.

== Release ==
=== Theatrical ===
Maine Pyar Kiya was released on 29 August 2025 in theaters worldwide, during the Onam festival period.

=== Distribution ===
Spire Productions distributed the film in India and Phars Film distributes the film in overseas.

=== Home media ===
The digital streaming rights of the film were acquired by Amazon Prime Video and ManoramaMAX, and the film was released on 1 October 2025. It also released digitally on Lionsgate Play from 3 October 2025.
