= Veera Dheera Sooran =

2025 Indian film by S. U. Arun Kumar

- Theatrical release poster
- Directed by: S. U. Arun Kumar
- Written by: S. U. Arun Kumar
- Produced by: Riya Shibu; Mumthas M.
- Starring: Vikram; S. J. Suryah; Suraj Venjaramoodu; Dushara Vijayan; Prudhvi Raj
- Cinematography: Theni Eswar
- Edited by: Prasanna GK
- Music by: G. V. Prakash Kumar
- Production company: HR Pictures
- Distributed by: Five Star K. Senthil
- Release date: 27 March 2025
- Running time: 162 minutes
- Country: India
- Language: Tamil
- Budget: ₹55 crore
- Box office: ₹66 crore

Veera Dheera Sooran – Part 2 (transl. Brave Heroic Warrior – Part 2) is a 2025 Indian Tamil-language neo-noir action thriller film written and directed by S. U. Arun Kumar. It is produced by Riya Shibu under HR Pictures. The film stars Vikram in the titular role, alongside S. J. Suryah, Suraj Venjaramoodu (in his Tamil debut), Dushara Vijayan and Prudhvi Raj.

The film was officially announced in October 2023 under the tentative title Chiyaan 62, as it is the 62nd film for Vikram, known popularly as Chiyaan, as the lead actor, and the official title was announced in April 2024. Principal photography began the same month and wrapped by mid-November 2024. The film has music composed by G. V. Prakash Kumar, cinematography handled by Theni Eswar and editing by Prasanna GK.

Veera Dheera Sooran: Part – 2 was initially scheduled to be released on 30 January 2025, but was postponed. It was released worldwide on 27 March 2025 in standard and EPIQ formats to positive reviews from critics with praise for the cast performances (particularly Vikram and Suryah) and became a commercial success at the box office.

== Plot ==
On the night of the local temple festival in Madurai, tensions escalate between SP Arunagiri and former mobster boss "Periyavar" Ravi, leading to the former deciding to kill the latter and his son Kannan in a staged encounter. Ravi goes to his former enforcer, Kaali, for help. Kaali, now a provision store owner, leads a blissful life with his wife, Kalaivaani "Kalai", and their two children, Janani and Dilip. He does not want to resort to violence again but eventually decides to help Ravi as he begs him and assures him that he will not get caught.

Kaali and Venkat, his former friend and Ravi's nephew, get hold of landmines from Ravi's old house after Kaali decides to use traditional weapons rather than modern ones so that even if they succeed, the deed would not be traced back to them. Kaali sets up a few landmines and connects them with a string so that Arunagiri's vehicle would run over the string and explode. However, in the process of doing so, Venkat suffers a seizure, leading to him falling with Kaali in tow, who barely manages to grab him before Venkat is about to hit the mines and trigger them. They ultimately fail to kill Arunagiri, and Kaali reports the same back to Ravi. Kannan comes into the picture and intervenes, threatening to kill Kaali and his family, who are at the temple festival.

A flashback reveals that on the day of Kaali and Kalai's marriage eight years ago, Kaali's best friend Dilip was killed by a police inspector through sheer police brutality after Dilip had called him in an informal tone. Since then, then-DSP Arunagiri was also present when Dilip was taken into custody in public, and the inspector is also the son-in-law of an influential MLA. Periyavar (then only Ravi) and Kannan, who hope to secure a big mining contract in the region, are told about Dilip by Arunagiri and decide to use the information to blackmail the politician into giving them the contract, all the while pretending to be ignorant of Dilip's death in front of Kaali. Eventually, Arunagiri tells Kaali and Kalai about Dilip's fate, and a devastated Kaali decides to kill the politician. With Venkat and a couple of other men, they attack the inspector's house when he is with his family. However, Kaali refuses to kill him and instead decides to surrender to Arunagiri. At the police station, when the politician rudely speaks of Dilip, Kaali brandishes a hidden locally handmade gun and shoots him, while also killing the inspector. Ravi and Kannan then make an appearance and promise Arunagiri that they will ensure his suspension is brief as long as he keeps quiet about them knowing of Dilip's death beforehand, and Kaali is left untouched. Arunagiri is subsequently suspended for a year for preventing the murder of the MLA in his office, and that incident has kept his career stagnant in powerless positions. Arunagiri had to beg and bribe politicians to be promoted to SP and then wait patiently to return to Madurai.

In the present, Kaali discloses Kannan's location to Arunagiri as Kaali was worried about his family's safety. Kaali catches up with Arunagiri, telling the former to get Kannan to disclose Ravi's whereabouts. When Kaali goes to talk to him, a phone call from Kannan's mother tells him that there is a black sheep amongst them. In the process, believing the three men that are with him are the traitors, he shoots them dead, whilst not finding out that it is actually Kaali. Eventually, Ravi's men come to rescue Kannan, and a shootout ensues between Kannan and Arunagiri's force. They are all shot and killed, except for a gravely injured Arunagiri and another inspector. Kaali finds them, and Arunagiri tells him that the only way he can come out of the other side is by somehow keeping him alive and letting him do his job. However, while escaping, his car is hit by Kannan's. As they go to Ravi with Kaali and Arunagiri, he learns that Kaali was the black sheep. The latter fights back by hacking Kannan's arm off and killing him and his men afterwards, whilst Arunagiri assures Kaali's safety.

Kaali reunites with Kalai and tells her he killed Kannan, much to her dismay. They find that Venkat was eavesdropping on them, leading to a chase where Kaali contemplates killing him but ultimately decides to let him go. However, the latter suffers from another seizure, prompting Kaali to go back to his house to get water for him. As he is about to leave to tend to Venkat, Ravi arrives with his family, and they soon learn of Kaali's involvement in Kannan's death, prompting an intense confrontation at his house. Ravi kills an injured Arunagiri for playing a role in Kannan's death when he promises him not to do anything if they decide to kill Kaali and his family. However, Kaali fights back and eventually kills Ravi and his men using the landmines. He leaves afterwards, telling Ravi's grieving wife that he had to protect his family at all costs. He and his family board a bus and leave town for good. Kaali smiles at the kid who boards the bus with her parents. The kid smiles back at Kaali, recognizing him as the one who helped her mother when she fainted while returning from Ravi's home.

== Cast ==
- Vikram as R. Kaali
- S. J. Suryah as SP A. Arunagiri IPS
- Suraj Venjaramoodu as Kannan, Ravi's son
- Dushara Vijayan as K. Kalaivaani "Kalai", Kaali's wife
- Prudhvi Raj as "Periyavar" Ravi, Kannan's father and Kaali's former boss
- Baalaji S. U. as Venkat
- Ramesh Indira as Old Periyavar
- Maala Parvathi as Ravi's wife
- Sreeja Ravi as Kaali's mother
- Suvedha G. as Sreeja, Ravi's daughter
- Kalaiyarasan Raj
- A. K. Rahul
- Jhansi Rangaraj
- Kani
- Pavalan
- Naattu Raja Durai as Inspector Sudhakar
- S. Rose Milan
- Ilaiyaraja
- Aavni Anjalinair as Janani, Kaali and Kalaivaani's daughter
- E. S. Rigveth Ram
- Baby Ananthi
- Priya Udhayakumar as Kannan's wife
- Suresh
- Navneeth
- Chidambaram

== Production ==
=== Development ===
In early October 2023, S. U. Arun Kumar, who gained recent popularity from the success of Chithha (2023), was reported to feature Vikram in the lead role for his next directorial. HR Pictures, the production company headed by producer Shibu Thameens' daughter Riya Shibu, officially announced the project on 28 October 2023 under the tentative title Chiyaan 62, referring to the lead actor's 62nd film. An accompanying announcement video was also released on the same date, further indicating that the film would be an action drama film set in a village backdrop.

Pre-production began during early December 2023, where Vikram and Arun travelled to Goa for script discussion. G. V. Prakash Kumar was assigned as the film's music director, while Theni Eswar was selected to handle the cinematography. Prasanna GK and C. S. Balachander, the latter of whom has been associated with Arun Kumar's films, has been recruited as the film's editor and Art Director, respectively. The film's title Veera Dheera Sooran: Part – 2 was announced on 17 April 2024, coinciding Vikram's birthday. It was intentionally given that subtitle, reportedly because the makers were planning a prequel with the subtitle Part 1. A separate film titled Veera Dheera Sooran began production some years before but was dropped, making the title usable for this film.

=== Casting ===
"...each role is important. All characters are a little bit grey, all of them have a justification. Nobody is a villain or hero. We are all selfish in some way. There are a lot of layers to the characters"

— Vikram, on the characters of Veera Dheera Sooran

In February 2024, the producers announced that S. J. Suryah would play an important role. The following March, Malayalam actor Suraj Venjaramoodu was cast in another important role, marking his Tamil debut. Suraj insisted on acting in the film even before Arun wanted to narrate his story, as he liked Arun's work in Pannaiyarum Padminiyum (2014) and Chithha (2023), and also stated that he did not understand anything during the script narration as the director was narrating in Tamil but still okayed the script. Being a fan of Suraj's work, Arun added "On the first day, there were so many dialogues for him. But he was able to deliver them easily. The reason for that was he ensured that he got his dialogues in advance, got a translator to translate it for him and then memorised them completely. If you watch the film, there won't be lip synching anywhere in the film. More significantly, he does not know Tamil."

Dushara Vijayan was paired opposite Vikram as the female lead. Arun stated that he wanted someone to have a fresh pairing opposite Vikram, which resulted in Dushara's casting. However, it received criticism due to the 31-year age gap between the lead actors. Siddique joined the cast in late-April 2024 and would appear in a pivotal role while the film was still in pre-production but did not feature in the film.

=== Filming ===
DT Next reported that principal photography would begin with the first schedule in March 2024 in Tiruttani. However, filming began on 24 April 2024. Shibu Thameens added that the production would continue with consecutive schedules being held in full-stretch. The first schedule was held predominantly at Madurai and Tenkasi, and was concluded on 17 May. As per Arun Kumar, nearly 30 percent of the film's shooting has been completed within the first schedule itself.

The team initially planned to commence the second schedule from 20 June at Karaikudi. However, the schedule instead commenced at Madurai on 25 June. In early-August, the team shot and completed the pre-climax portions, which resulted in the second schedule being wrapped. In late August, after Vikram completed his participation in the promotional activities for Thangalaan (2024), the team began filming for the month-long concurrent schedule at Madurai. During this schedule, an 18-minute-long sequence featuring Vikram, Suryah and Suraj were canned in a single take. Filming wrapped by mid-November 2024.

== Music ==
Veera Dheera Sooran

Soundtrack album by G. V. Prakash Kumar
- Genre: Feature film soundtrack
- Language: Tamil
- Label: Think Music
- Producer: G. V. Prakash Kumar

G. V. Prakash Kumar chronology
Kingston (2025)	Veera Dheera Sooran (2025)	Robinhood (2025)

Singles from Veera Dheera Sooran
- 1. "Kalloorum" Released: 11 January 2025; 2. "Aaathi Adi Aaathi" Released: 5 March 2025; 3. "Ayla Allela" Released: 24 March 2025

External audio
- Veera Dheera Sooran - Jukebox on YouTube

The music and background score is composed by G. V. Prakash Kumar, in his maiden collaboration with Arun; fourth with Vikram after Deiva Thirumagal (2011), Thaandavam (2012), and Thangalaan (2024). The audio rights for the film was secured by Think Music. The title teaser theme "Veera Dheera Sooran Title Teaser" was released on 24 April 2024. The title track titled "Veera Dheera" released on 15 December 2024. The first single "Kalloorum" released on 11 January 2025. The second single "Aaathi Adi Aaathi" was released on 5 March 2025. The pre-release audio launch event was held on 20 March 2025 at Vel Tech University, Chennai, following which the audio jukebox was released. The promo song "Ayla Allela" released on 24 March 2025.

Track listing
No.	Title	Lyrics	Singer(s)	Length
1.	"Veera Dheera Sooran Title Teaser"	-	G. V. Prakash Kumar	1:02
2.	"Veera Dheera"	-	G. V. Prakash Kumar	1:32
3.	"Kalloorum"	Vivek	Haricharan, Shweta Mohan	3:32
4.	"Aaathi Adi Aaathi"	Vivek	G. V. Prakash Kumar, Sadhika K R	2:44
5.	"Ayla Allela"	Vivek	Velmurugan	3:03

== Release ==
=== Theatrical ===
Veera Dheera Sooran was released in theatres on 27 March 2025 in standard and EPIQ formats. Earlier it was scheduled for 30 January 2025. The film was cleared by the Central Board of Film Certification on 22 March.

=== Delayed release issue ===
On 26 March 2025, the Delhi High Court issued an interim stay on the release of the film until 10:30 am the next day, following a case filed by B4U Media seeking compensation since it was unable to sell the film on OTT because the film release was announced even before selling its digital license. So, the first show scheduled at 9 am in Tamil Nadu, morning shows across other states in India and premiere shows in the US were cancelled until 11 am subject to resolving of this case.

It was reported that the screening would begin by noon. But the Delhi High Court ordered HR Pictures to deposit Rs. 7 crores immediately and submit all the documents within the next 48 hours to release the film in theatres. Further, it was also reported that Vikram, S. J. Suryah and S. U. Arun Kumar had offered to fund their producer to aid the film's release for the afternoon show. But the Delhi Court extended the interim stay halting the film's release for the next four weeks. It was also reported that, both the parties were planning to work together to find an amicable solution and also appeal to the judge in this regard, to release the film latest by 6 pm.

As both the parties finally negotiated, by afternoon, the Delhi High Court bench reversed its earlier interim order, thereby granting permission to release the film from 6 pm on the same release date as planned earlier, which was officially confirmed by the director himself.

=== Home media ===
The film began streaming on Amazon Prime Video from 24 April 2025 in Tamil and dubbed versions of Telugu, Hindi, Malayalam and Kannada languages.

== Reception ==
=== Critical response ===
Veera Dheera Sooran: Part – 2 received positive reviews from critics.

Anusha Sundar of OTTPlay gave 3.5/5 stars and wrote "Arun Kumar has really spent enough and more time to develop the world of the film, which relies more on detailing. [...] It is a film that would make you go amiss if you blink, for it is loaded with tiny references and expressions that you need to catch hold of. Albeit lags, Veera Dheera Sooran: Part 2 is a film that is both rustic and new form of storytelling." T Maruthi Acharya of India Today gave 3.5/5 stars and wrote "Arun Kumar builds a slow, layered narrative where every decision carries weight. The pacing may feel unhurried, but it adds to the tension before things finally explode.[...] One of the film’s biggest strengths is its focus on choices and consequences rather than just action.[...] That said, the film isn’t without its flaws. The second half slows down, and the pacing can feel uneven."

Kaushik Rajaraman of DT Next gave 3.5/5 stars and wrote "Overall, Veera Dheera Sooran is where Kochi meets Kodambakkam. It is a Malayalam brain stuffed in a Tamil body. A strong content with mass moments paccked that will make you glued to your seats while you whistle loudly and applaud." Prashanth Vallavan of Cinema Express gave 3.5/5 stars and wrote "Veera Dheera Sooran: Part 2 feels like Arunkumar is throwing things at you from the top of a speeding train while you are driving a car. As you figure out that the things he is throwing at you are jigsaw puzzle pieces, you realise the intense curiosity welling up inside that compels you to chase the train and complete the puzzle, and thankfully, the completed puzzle is as exciting as the chase itself."

Avinash Ramachandran of The Indian Express gave 3/5 stars and wrote "Veera Dheera Sooran is as much an evolution for Vikram as it is for Arun Kumar. The filmmaker has risen up to this challenge, and even when he falters a bit, the film remains interesting. And it is quite nice to see Vikram in a film that doesn’t make the audience or even critics say, "Vikram was great in a film that didn’t do justice to his talent." Actually, very nice." M. Suganth of The Times of India gave 3/5 stars and wrote "And tense action keeps unfolding as there are cat-and-mouse-game-like scenarios and near-miss episodes that keep us hooked.[...] The film would have remained unique and engaging if Arun Kumar had trusted his audience and chosen to show us only the events that unfold during this one night.[...] Arun Kumar undoes all the earlier good work with a weakly written third act that leaves us with a slightly bitter aftertaste."

Bhuvanesh Chandar of The Hindu wrote "Where Veera Dheera Sooran stands out, for the most part, is how information is withheld and how scenes are conceived.[...] Veera Dheera Sooran is what fans of Vikram have longed for, but it isn’t just for them. It’s a grand spicy meal at a muniyandi vilas in Madurai. All meat lovers are welcome here."

== Future ==
Following the release of Veera Dheera Sooran: Part 2, actor Vikram confirmed that the franchise will expand in both directions. He revealed that Part 1 will centre on the character Dileep, who is implied but never seen in Part 2, and Part 3 will focus on the fate of Venkat, whose conclusion in Part 2 remains unspecified.

Director S. U. Arun Kumar has described the narrative structure as intentionally non-linear releasing Part 2 first, followed by a prequel and a sequel-creating a layered storytelling arc built around Kaali's journey. The full trilogy will reveal Kaali's past (Part 1), the central conflict (Part 2), and the continuation of the story (Part 3).
