= Anna Ben =

Indian actress

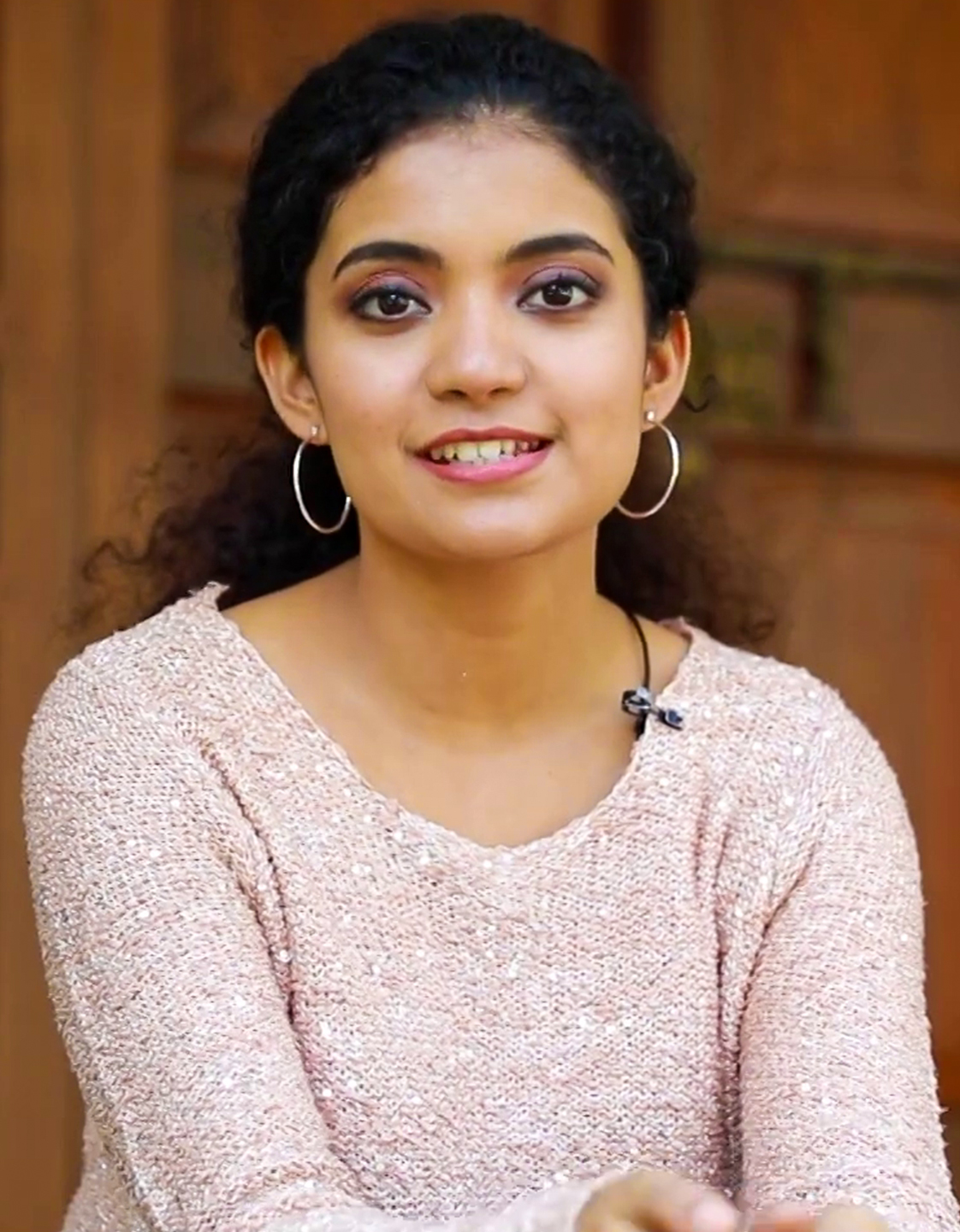
- Anna in 2020
- Born: Kochi, Kerala, India
- Education: St. Teresa's College
- Occupation: Actress
- Years active: 2019–present
- Father: Benny P. Nayarambalam

Anna Ben is an Indian actress who works primarily in Malayalam films. She made her acting debut with Kumbalangi Nights in 2019. For her starring roles in the dramas Helen (2019), Kappela (2020) and Kottukkaali (2024), she won two Kerala State Film Awards and one Filmfare Award South.

She has since played a supporting role in the top-grossing Telugu science fiction film Kalki 2898 AD (2024) and has won the SIIMA Award for Best Supporting Actress – Telugu.

== Early life ==
Anna was born and raised in Kochi, Kerala. She is the daughter of a screenwriter Benny P. Nayarambalam and Fulja. She completed schooling from Chinmaya Vidyalaya, Vaduthala. She is a fashion and apparel design graduate from St. Teresa's College, Kochi.

== Career ==
Anna made her feature movie debut in 2019 through commercially and critically successful Kumbalangi Nights in which she played the female lead Baby. She was selected through four rounds of auditions. She described her character as "modern and traditional simultaneously, rooted, with her own point-of-view". The Hindu wrote, "She stood out even in the presence of seasoned performers". The success of that film paved the way for Helen, a survival drama in which she played the titular character of Helen, and Kappela, both appreciated by audience and critics. Director Sathyan Anthikad praised her acting in the former, and Manorama Online reported, "Anna Ben makes Kappela a delightful journey". Anna has also appeared in music videos.

== Filmography ==
Key
| † | Denotes films that have not yet been released |

=== Films ===
| Year | Film | Role | Language | Notes | Ref. |
|---|---|---|---|---|---|
| 2019 | Kumbalangi Nights | Babymol | Malayalam | | |
| 2019 | Helen | Helen Paul | Malayalam | | |
| 2020 | Kappela | Jessi Varghese | Malayalam | | |
| 2021 | Sara's | Sara Vincent | Malayalam | | |
| 2022 | Naaradan | Shakira Mohammed | Malayalam | | |
| 2022 | Night Drive | Riya Roy | Malayalam | | |
| 2022 | Kaapa | Binu Thrivikraman | Malayalam | | |
| 2023 | Thrishanku | Megha | Malayalam | | |
| 2024 | Kalki 2898 AD | Kyra | Telugu | | |
| 2024 | Kottukkaali | Meena | Tamil | | |
| 2025 | Lokah Chapter 1: Chandra | Sunny's ex-girlfriend | Malayalam | Cameo appearance | |
| 2026 | Con City | Mithra | Tamil | | |
| TBA | Coimbatore Mappillaii † | Kanagavalli | Tamil | Completed | |

=== Television ===
| Year | Title | Role(s) | Language | Platform | Notes | Ref. |
|---|---|---|---|---|---|---|
| 2024 | Bujji and Bhairava | Kyra | Telugu | Amazon Prime Video | Voice | |

== Awards ==
| Award | Year | Category | Film | Result |
|---|---|---|---|---|
| Kerala State Film Awards | 2019 | Special Jury Mention | Helen | Won |
| Kerala State Film Awards | 2020 | Best Actress | Kappela | Won |
| Filmfare Awards South | 2024 | Best Actress - Tamil | Kottukkaali | Nominated |
| Filmfare Awards South | 2024 | Critics Best Actress – Tamil | Kottukkaali | Won |
| CPC Cine Awards | 2019 | Best Actress in Lead Role | Kumbalangi Nights, Helen | Won |
| SIIMA Awards | 2021 | Best Female Debut – Malayalam | Kumbalangi Nights | Won |
| SIIMA Awards | 2021 | Best Actress – Malayalam | Helen | Nominated |
| SIIMA Awards | 2021 | Critics Best Actress – Malayalam | Kappela | Won |
| SIIMA Awards | 2021 | Best Actress (Malayalam) | Kappela | Nominated |
| SIIMA Awards | 2024 | Best Supporting Actress – Telugu | Kalki 2898 AD | Won |
| Asianet Film Awards | 2019 | Best New Face of the Year (Female) | Kumbalangi Nights | Won |
| Vanitha Film Awards | 2019 | Best Debutant Actress | Kumbalangi Nights | Won |
| Vanitha Film Awards | 2019 | Best Star Couple (shared with Shane Nigam) | Kumbalangi Nights | Won |
| Singapore International Film Festival | 2024 | Special Mention for Best Performance: Ensemble cast and the nature | Kottukkaali | Won |
