= Preity Mukhundhan =

Indian actress

- Born: 30 July 2001 (age 25); Tiruchirappalli, Tamil Nadu, India
- Education: National Institute of Technology Tiruchirappalli
- Occupations: Actress; Model; Dancer
- Years active: 2022–present

Preity Mukhundhan is an Indian actress, model and dancer who works predominantly in Tamil, Malayalam, and Telugu films. After appearing in music videos including "Aasa Kooda" (2024), she made her film debut with Om Bheem Bush (2024) and gained wider recognition for her role in Star (2024).

== Early life ==
Preity was born on 30 July 2001 in Tiruchirappalli, Tamil Nadu. She pursued her B.Tech in Electronics and Communication Engineering (ECE) from National Institute of Technology, Tiruchirappalli.

== Career ==
Preity made her film debut in the Telugu-language horror comedy film Om Bheem Bush. She played one of the leads in the 2024 Tamil-language coming-of-age romantic drama film Star opposite Kavin and directed by Elan.

Apart from her modelling and film careers, Preity had also appeared in the music videos of Teejay Arunasalam's song "Muttu Mu2" in 2022 featuring Yogi B & Sivaangi Krishnakumar, as well as Sai Abhyankkar's song "Aasa Kooda" in 2024. She acted in the romantic action Maine Pyar Kiya debuting in Malayalam cinema.

== Filmography ==
Key
†	Denotes films that have not yet been released

=== Films ===
Year	Title	Role(s)	Language(s)	Notes	Ref.
2024	Om Bheem Bush	Jalaja	Telugu	Telugu debut	
2024	Star	Meera Malarkodi	Tamil	Tamil debut	
2025	Kannappa	Nemali	Telugu		
2025	Maine Pyar Kiya	Nidhi	Malayalam	Malayalam debut	
2025	Sarvam Maya	Saadhya	Malayalam		
2026	Blast	Nila	Tamil		
2026	Idhayam Murali	Samantha/ Samyuktha	Tamil	Dual role	
2026	Anbil Avan	Iyal	Tamil		
2026	Emo Emo Idi †	Apurva	Telugu	Filming	
2026	Dashamakan †	TBA	Tamil	Filming	
2027	Naagzilla †	TBA	Hindi	Hindi debut	

=== Music videos ===
Year	Song	Artist(s)	Language	Label	Ref.
2022	"Muttu Mu2"	Teejay Arunasalam, Yogi B, Sivaangi Krishnakumar	Tamil	Divo Music	
2024	"Aasa Kooda"	Sai Abhyankkar, Sai Smriti	Tamil	Think Music India	
2024	"Morni"	Badshah, Sharvi Yadav	Hindi	Saregama Music	
