= Mumbaikar (film) =

2023 Indian film by Santosh Sivan

- Official release poster
- Directed by: Santosh Sivan
- Written by: Himanshu Singh; Amit Joshi
- Story by: Lokesh Kanagaraj
- Based on: Maanagaram (2017) by Lokesh Kanagaraj
- Produced by: Jyoti Deshpande; Riya Shibu
- Starring: Vikrant Massey; Vijay Sethupathi; Tanya Maniktala; Hridhu Haroon
- Cinematography: Santosh Sivan
- Edited by: Dilip Damodar
- Music by: Salil Amrute; Ram Surendar
- Production companies: HR Pictures; Jio Studios
- Distributed by: JioCinema
- Release date: 2 June 2023
- Running time: 122 minutes
- Country: India
- Language: Hindi

Mumbaikar is a 2023 Indian Hindi-language action thriller film directed by Santosh Sivan. A remake of Tamil film Maanagaram (2017), it stars Vikrant Massey, Vijay Sethupathi, Tanya Maniktala and Hridhu Haroon. This marks Vijay Sethupathi's Hindi film debut.

Principal photography commenced in January 2021. Mumbaikar released on 2 June 2023 on JioCinema.

== Plot ==
Several totally unconnected people are shown at a bar owned by a notorious crime boss known as PKP (Prabal Kant Patil). Fate would later connect each of them somehow. One of them is Vikrant, an unemployed youth, along with his friends. Vikrant harbors a dream to become an honest police officer someday. His uncle is police inspector Shinde in Mumbai. Another is Aadil, an engineering graduate from a small town, along with his own friends who just arrived in Mumbai to interview for an IT job.

Another is a goon, who is with his fellow goons, who was smashed in the face by Vikrant some days ago. (in a flashback shown below). Another is Sanjay, a poor middle-aged man, who just arrived in Mumbai to start as a driver at a taxi-fleet company, also owned by the same notorious crime boss, PKP.

Flashback: A former collegemate of Ishita has had an unrequited love for her since they were in college. He hires some local goons to scare Vikrant. Vikrant is seated at a table in a café. At another distant table, are Ishita and her friend Tanya. The goons come up to Vikrant's table to threaten Vikrant that they will throw acid in Ishita's face if he does not quit his “friendship” with Ishita, even showing him a bottle of acid. Enraged, Vikrant punches him and smashes his face on the table. The goon, very badly hurt, runs away. Ishita and her friend, not knowing any of the details of is going on, watch this in horror from a distance.

Present: Ishita is a HR executive and Aadil has just completed the interview with her in the morning. Ishita has selected him and has asked him to hand over his certificates the next day at the office. Aadil looks forward to a happy life in Mumbai.

The goon recognizes Vikrant in the bar, quickly leaves the bar, to avoid being seen by Vikrant again and maybe getting beat up again. Once outside, he hires another local gang to thrash him up as soon as Vikrant leaves the bar. However, the identification being merely on the shirt-color and facial features, causes the just-hired gang to beat up Aadil instead, knocking him unconscious. They grab his phone and leather bag, tossing the latter into one of PKP's taxis parked nearby. This would eventually end up with Sanjay when he starts his own job!

Sanjay later finds Aadil's bag and his academic certificates, and being kind and helpful by nature, he takes it to the nearby police station (which happens to be where Vikrant's uncle works.) In the morning, Aadil wakes up by the streetside and borrowing a phone from someone, calls a local friend to take him home. He boards a bus to his new job, to explain about his missing academic certificates. Vikrant boards the same bus upon recognizing that the acid-attack goon is also present inside. Aadil who just boarded the bus was forced, by circumstances, to pick up and pass on the bottle to Vikrant who now attacks the goon himself with a full bottle acid, then escapes with his friends. The goon writhes in pain and the bus is directed to a police station. Aadil is detained by the police, having unwittingly passed the bottle of acid to Vikrant. He is subsequently released with the help of his local friend who has been hosting him temporarily.

The gang that beat up Aadil, meanwhile, plots to kidnap schoolboy Rahul, son of Jhunjhunwala, for ransom, sending a newly recruited gang member named Munnu to his school. Munnu is unprepared when there are five boys named Rahul in the classroom, but later discovers that a different kid, also named Rahul, who self-offered to go outside with Munnu just to avoid a math test! The gang later realizes this is the son of gangster PKP, not the son of Jhunjhunwala. Although initially terrified, they see that they have no option to proceed with the ransom from PKP and decide to use Munnu to make phone calls to PKP. The gang demands a ₹1 crore ransom and PKP agrees to follow their instructions.

Aadil being tired of big city already, tells Ishita that he no longer wants the job. She asks him to take the company's training so that she won't be held responsible for his quitting. They begin to talk back and forth about it and Vikrant, who is always short tempered, waiting for his own interview, intervenes. The police arrive and take Vikrant away, saddening Ishita who likes him but cannot understand his nature. Aadil tells Ishita that he lost his academic certificates, and she agrees to cover for him for a day.

PKP orders his henchmen to hunt down his enemies in search of Rahul. Meanwhile, Vikrant is released by the police inspector Shinde since he happens to be his nephew but asks him to run away from Mumbai for a month. Vikrant waits for Ishita near her hostel to say good bye. Ishita and Vikrant both suddenly see Rahul in the back of a truck, who had just escaped the kidnappers (secretly helped by Munnu, who had just abandoned the gang). Ishita instructs Vikrant to try and somehow take Rahul home safely.

A confusing barrage of phone calls from the desperate gangsters to direct PKP to various places around Mumbai (Byculla, J P Road, Kishan Wadi etc. ). They do that to buy time since they just lost the custody of the boy and are trying to find the boy desperately. Vikrant calls PKP, but PKP who has already received multiple calls from goons mistakes him for the same and yells at him for suggesting a meeting at a new location. Vikrant and Ishita then meet his uncle on the way. His uncle, who is in the know of the kidnapping of the notorious gangster's son through official channels, instantly recognizes the opportunity to make his own money by using the boy, and starts to hatch a plan.

Although Vikrant is unhappy that he could not take the boy home, he is at least happy that his own uncle has him now. Shortly before that Shinde also caught Munnu in the street. Corrupt Shinde now tries to use Munnu to make his phone calls to PKP, to make him deliver the money bag to where he is now! He also hopes to make Munnu guilty eventually after the money is safely in his hands. He threatens and coerces Munnu to make the calls. PKP, who has been driving all night long to various places, is now extremely confused and angry but complies for his son's safety.

In the climax, the gangsters mistake the car with Aadil and taxi driver Sanjay for PKP's henchmen and in an act of desperation try to attack Sanjay mercilessly. But Aadil is unable to take it anymore and fights like a man possessed and kills the gangsters. Meanwhile, Vikrant borrows Ishita's scooter and is on the way home when he finds his uncle Shinde at the street side directing Munnu, as his mouthpiece to talk to PKP by dictating what to say, and making demands while holding the little boy's hand and mouth tied.

He instantly understands the evil plan of his uncle since it was only a short time ago that he personally handed over the boy to his ‘safe custody’. Seeing the boy now tied up and being held at gun point and seeing Munnu being used as a mouthpiece by the hiding Shinde, gives him a clear picture of what is going on. A gun fight ensues, and Shinde shoots at PKP injuring him on his shoulder. Vikrant grabs the injured PKP's own gun and shoots his uncle in both legs immobilizing him. He hands over the boy and the gunshot injured PKP to Munnu and asks him to drive away to the nearest hospital and then escape. Police soon arrive and question the injured inspector about what happened and Shinde who just lost a corrupt bid to make money, lies about the whole incident. He is taken to the hospital.

The movie ends with one final meeting between Vikrant and Aadil, by a coincidence, who up until that point in time, still do not know each other's names though fate had already messed them up and made them face each other many times.

== Cast ==
- Vikrant Massey
- Vijay Sethupathi as Munnu
- Tanya Maniktala as Ishita
- Hridhu Haroon as Aadil
- Sanjay Mishra as the taxi driver
- Ranvir Shorey as PKP alias Prabal Kant Patil
- Sachin Khedekar as a police officer

== Production ==
In September 2020, the media reported that cinematographer Santosh Sivan would direct the Hindi remake of Maanagaram with Vikrant Massey. In October 2020, Vijay Sethupathi was reported to make his Hindi debut with this film.

== Reception ==
Mumbaikar received negative reviews from critics.

On the review aggregator website Rotten Tomatoes, 0% of 6 critics' reviews are positive, with an average rating of 5/10.

A critic from The Times of India wrote that "'Mumbaikar' raises high expectations, but unfortunately, it only partially fulfills its promise. However, Vijay Sethupathi's performance manages to redeem the film to some extent, injecting moments of brilliance into the narrative". A critic from The Hindu wrote that "The film marks his Hindi debut, but Vijay Sethupathi is a little too spectacular for the size of the film. As for Sivan, Mumbaikar might well count as yet another directorial venture that doesn’t match his stature as a cinematographer". Saibal Chatterjee a critic from NDTV wrote that "The Writing Does Not Fully Align With Vijay Sethupathi's Skills".
