= Sreeja Ravi =

Indian voice artist

- Born: Kannur, Kerala, India
- Occupations: Voice over artist, Actress
- Years active: 1975 - present
- Spouse: Raveendranathan (Late)
- Children: Raveena Ravi
- Awards: Kerala State Film Award; Tamil Nadu State Film Awards; Kerala Film Critics Awards; Kerala State Television Awards

Sreeja Ravi is an Indian voice artist and actress in Tamil and Malayalam Films, who dubbed over 2000 films and commercial advertisements. She started her dubbing career in the year 1975 for the movie Uttarayanam, directed by G. Aravindan. She is the winner of four time Kerala State Film Award, one Tamil Nadu State Film Award and two Kerala Film Critics Awards and a Kerala State Television Award for dubbing.

Sreeja can speak Malayalam, Hindi, Tamil, Telugu, Bengali, English, Sanskrit and also Kannada, as she used those seven major Indian languages to perform dubbing roles in foreign productions.

== Personal life ==
Sreeja was born to Kunjukuttan, who was a mechanical engineer and Kannur Narayani, who was a theater and dubbing artist. After her father's death in 1972, the family moved to Chennai. Her mother started working as a dubbing artist and has acted in a few movies and dramas. Sreeja used to go to studios with her mother and eventually started dubbing. She has eight siblings, out of which two are no more. Her siblings are Manomohan, Madanmohan, Sreedharan, Prakashbabu, Rasiklal, Jyothish Kumar, Dr Vijayalakshmi Rajan Singh and Premasudha Krishnankutty.

She is married to Raveendranathan. The couple has a daughter, Raveena Ravi, who is also a dubbing artist in Tamil, Malayalam, and Telugu.

== Acting career ==
In the start of her career, she acted in films like Manassu (1973), Sethubandhanam (1974) and Raathriyile Yaathrakkaar (1976).

She appeared in a small role in Kandukonden Kandukonden (2000) as a programmer who is pregnant, with whom Tabu talks about the difficulties in finding a house.

She played the character of Cookeramma in Anoop Sathyan's Varane Aavashyamundu (2020) along with Shobhana, K.P.A.C. Lalitha, Dulquer Salman and Kalyani Priyadarshan. She also appeared in Jimmy Ee Veedinte Aiswaryam (2019).

Sreeja Ravi was introduced as a dialogue writer and was involved in the dubbing direction for the Tamil and Malayalam dubbed version of Shaakuntalam directed by Gunasekhar, where she did dub for Gautami and Aditi Balan in Tamil.

== Dubbing career ==
She started her dubbing career on films like Thambu and Uttarayanam as crowd voice. Then slowly started to give voice for child artists. Her first film for give voice to heroine was Ilaneer. But Kattathe Kilikkoodu was make her popular on Malayalam film industry. In it she dubbed for Revathi and Master Prashobh.

She mostly dubbed for actresses like Kavya Madhavan, Divya Unni, Shalini, Gopika, Devayani, Sunitha, Charmila, Nayanthara and Roma.

== Filmography as voice actress ==
=== Tamil ===
This list is incomplete.

Year	Film	For whom
1984	Anbulla Rajinikanth	Master Tinku
1985	Japanil Kalyanaraman	Master Tinku
1987	Poovizhi Vasalile	Baby Sujitha
1987	Rettai Vaal Kuruvi	Gopi's daughter (Climax scene)
1987	Manathil Uruthi Vendum	Baby Vasanthi
1988	Paadatha Thenikkal	Baby Sujitha
1989	Sandhya Raagam	Baby Rajalakshmi
1992	Vanna Vanna Pookkal	Vinodhini
1992	Unna Nenachen Pattu Padichen	Monisha Unni
1993	I Love India	Shenbaga
1993	Gentleman	Subhashri
1995	Sathi Leelavathi	Heera
1995	Criminal	Manisha Koirala
1995	Thotta Chinungi	Devayani
1996	Kadhal Kottai	Devayani
1996	Mahaprabhu	Vineetha
1996	Netaji	Lisa Ray
1996	Gokulathil Seethai	Suvaluxmi
1997	Pudhayal	Roopa Sree
1997	Vivasaayi Magan	Devayani
1997	Kaadhali	Devayani
1997	Raman Abdullah	Ashwini
1997	Kaalamellam Kadhal Vaazhga	Kausalya
1997	Vaimaye Vellum	Rachna Banerjee
1997	Love Today	Suvaluxmi
1997	Nerukku Ner	Simran
1997	Kadhalukku Mariyadhai	Shalini
1998	Ninaithen Vandhai	Devayani
1998	Pudhumaipithan	Devayani
1998	Marumalarchi	Devayani
1998	Udhavikku Varalaamaa	Devayani
1998	Ponmanam	Suvaluxmi
1998	Santhosham	Suvaluxmi
1998	Kavalai Padathe Sagodhara	Suvaluxmi
1998	En Aasai Rasave	Suvaluxmi
1998	Dhinamdhorum	Suvaluxmi
1998	Unnudan	Kausalya
1998	Kaadhale Nimmadhi	Jividha Sharma
1998	Desiya Geetham	Rambha
1998	Kadhal Kavithai	Kasthuri
1999	Amarkkalam	Shalini
1999	Kanave Kalaiyadhe	Simran
1999	Ponnu Veettukaaran	Preetha Vijayakumar
1999	Pooparika Varugirom	Malavika
1999	Oruvan	Pooja Batra
1999	Sangamam	Vindhya
1999	Kallazhagar	Ashwini
1999	Paattali	Devayani
2000	Vaanathaipola	Kausalya
2000	Eazhaiyin Sirippil	Kausalya
2000	Maayi	Suvaluxmi
2000	Ennavalle	Ashwini
2000	Kannukkul Nilavu	Shalini
2001	Piriyadha Varam Vendum	Shalini
2001	En Purushan Kuzhandhai Maathiri	Vindhya
2001	Friends	Vijayalakshmi
2001	Badri	Bhumika Chawla
2001	Kanna Unnai Thedukiren	Suvaluxmi
2001	Minnale	Raji Iyer (Reemasen's Friend)
2001	Kasi	Aishwarya, Kaveri
2001	Anandham	Rambha
2001	Dhill	Laila
2001	Parthale Paravasam	Radhika Chaudhari
2001	Alli Thandha Vaanam	Neha
2001	Vadagupatti Maapillai	Reshma
2002	Alli Arjuna	Richa Pallod
2002	Kamarasu	Laila
2002	Thenkasi Pattanam	Aswathi Menon
2002	En Mana Vaanil	Kavya Madhavan
2003	3 Roses	Rambha
2003	Enakku 20 Unakku 18	Trisha's Friend
2003	Kadhal Sugamanathu	Sneha
2003	Anbe Un Vasam	Rathi Arumugam
2003	Ice	Priyanka Trivedi
2003	Yes Madam	Vijayalakshmi
2005	Majaa	Anu Prabhakar
2011	Kavalan	Mithra Kurian and Ammukutti Asin
2012	Neerparavai	Church Mother
2012	Ivan Veramathiri	Charmila
2018	Mohini	Rama
2019	Ayogya	Pavitra Lokesh
2020	Vanmurai	Charmila

=== Other Languages ===
Ravi works as a voice actress in Telugu, Kannada and Bollywood industries, apart from the Malayalam and Tamil film industries.

Year	Language	Film	For whom
1987	Kannada	Aapadbandhava	Baby Sujitha
1987	Telugu	Pasivadi Pranam	Baby Sujitha
1988	Hindi	Hatya	Baby Sujitha
2003	Hindi	Three Roses	Jyothika
2004	Telugu	Seenu Vasanthi Lakshmi	Navaneet Kaur
2006	Kannada	My Autograph	Sridevika
2022	Sanskrit	Thaya	Anumol

==== Dialogues or effects between songs ====
Year	Title	Film	Language	Composer	Co-artist	Dubbed for
2002	"Ente ellam ellam alle"	Meesa Madhavan	Malayalam	Vidyasagar	K. J. Yesudas & Sujatha Mohan	Kavya Madhavan
2006	"Pooncholai Kiliye"	Keerthichakra	Malayalam	Joshua Sridhar	Karthik & Asha G. Menon	Gopika
2008	"Mizhiyil Mizhiyil"	Mayabazaar	Malayalam	Rahul Raj	Srinivas & Sujatha Mohan	Sheela Kaur

== Filmography as actress ==
=== Malayalam ===
Year	Title	Role	Notes
1973	Manassu		
1974	Sethubandhanam		
1976	Raathriyile Yaathrakkaar		
1983	Ee Yugam		
2019	Jimmy Ee Veedinte Aishwaryam	Jimmy's Mother	
2020	Varane Avashyamund	Maid	
2021	Vellakkuthira		
2022	Rorschach	Lekha	
2023	Kadina Kadoramee Andakadaham	Nabeesa	
2023	2018	Anoop's mother	
2024	Super Zindagi	Lekha	
2024	Bharathanatyam	Rugmini Bharathan Nair	
2026	Bharathanatyam 2 Mohiniyattam	Rugmini Bharathan Nair	

=== Tamil ===
Year	Title	Role	Notes
2000	Kandukondain Kandukondain	Valsala	
2012	Nanban	Doctor	
2014	Jeeva		
2014	Veeram		
2015	Paayum Puli	Jayaseelan's mother	
2015	Vedalam	Nurse	
2017	Yeman	Wife of Karunakaran	
2018	Irumbu Thirai	Kathiravan's mother	
2018	Kaali	Bharath's Mother	
2018	Maniyaar Kudumbam	Narthanga Swamy's mother	
2019	Petromax	Kamala	
2021	Doctor	Varun's mother	
2021	Annaatthe	Doctor	
2022	Gatta Kusthi	Keerthi's mother	
2023	Theera Kaadhal	Amma	
2024	Romeo	Leela's mother	
2024	Maharaja	Aasifa's mother	
2024	Family Padam		
2025	Kadaisi Thotta	Anjali	
2025	Pei Kottu	Raji	
2025	Veera Dheera Sooran	Kaali's mother	
2025	Tourist Family	Mangaiyarkarasi	
2025	Paranthu Po	Gokul's mother	
2026	Nee Forever		
2026	Satan – The Dark		
2026	TN 2026	Sivalinga's mother	
2026	Kara	Dhanam	
2026	Gatta Kusthi 2	Keerthi's mother	
2026	Vishwanath & Sons	Anjali’s mother	

== TV serials & Webseries, Short films and ads ==
Dubbing

Year	Short Film	Actress	notes
2024	F For Freedom	Laya Simpson	Kerala State Television Award for Best Dubbing Artist

Channel	Serial	Actress	Character
Sun TV	Soolam	Suvalakshmi	Parvathi/Amman
Sun TV	Velan	Seetha	Uma
Sun TV	Raja Rajeswari	Malavika Avinash / Abitha	Raji
Sun TV	Athi Pookal	Sandhya	Karpagam
Jaya TV	Simran Thirai	Simran	
Surya TV	Naagakanyaka 1	Mouni Roy	Shivanya
Surya TV	Valsalyam	Vaishali Thakkar	Damini
Surya TV	Nandini	Nithya Ram	Nandini & Ganga

Ads

Year	Ad	Actress
-	V-Guard Industries	Shobana
2014	Nirapara Sambar	Kavya Madhavan
2015	Nirapara Sambar	Kavya Madhavan
2015	Nirapara Veg Pickle	Kavya Madhavan
2015	Nirapara Pathiri	Kavya Madhavan
2015	Nirapara Fish Masala	Kavya Madhavan
2015	Nirapara Dosa Podi	Kavya Madhavan
2015	Nirapara Varutharacha Masala	Kavya Madhavan
2015	Nirapara Coriander Powder	Kavya Madhavan
2015	Nirapara Veg Pickle	Akshara Kishore
2026	Kalyan Silks	model

== Awards ==
Award for best dubbing artist

Year	Award	Film	For
1997	Kerala State Film Awards	Aniyathi Pravu	Shalini
1998	Kerala State Film Awards	Aakasha Ganga	Divya Unni
1998	Kerala State Film Awards	Achamakuttiyude Achayan	Chippy
1998	Kerala State Film Awards	The Godman	Vani Viswanath
2001	Tamil Nadu State Film Awards	Dhil	Laila
2003	Kerala Film Critics Awards	Manassinakkare	Nayanthara
2007	Kerala Film Critics Awards	Paranju Theeratha Visheshangal	Lakshmi Gopalaswami
2008	Kerala State Film Awards	Minnaminnikkoottam	Roma
2013	Kerala State Film Awards	Ayaal	Ineya
2026	Kerala State Television Award	F for Freedom (Short film)	Laya Simpson

== See also ==
- List of Indian dubbing artists
- Raveena Ravi
- Kerala State Film Award for Best Dubbing Artist
- Tamil Nadu State Film Award for Best Female Dubbing Artist

== Notes ==
- 'എനിക്കിനിയൊരു സ്വാഭാവിക ജീവിതം ഉണ്ടാകില്ലെന്ന് ന്യൂറോ സര്‍ജന്‍ അന്ന് വിധിയെഴുതി'; ശ്രീജ പറയുന്നു
- ഈ ശബ്ദം കാവ്യ മാധവന്‍റേയോ ദിവ്യ ഉണ്ണിയുടെയോ, അതോ...; പ്രേക്ഷകരെ കണ്‍ഫ്യൂഷനാക്കിയ 'കുക്കറമ്മ' ആര്?
- Petromax World Television Premiere Tamil Comedy Horror Film On TV
- ഈ ശബ്ദം കാവ്യ മാധവന്‍റേയോ ദിവ്യ ഉണ്ണിയുടെയോ, അതോ...; പ്രേക്ഷകരെ കണ്‍ഫ്യൂഷനാക്കിയ 'കുക്കറമ്മ' ആര്?
- ‘അത് കാവ്യ മാധവന്റെ ശബ്ദമല്ലേ’: പ്രേക്ഷകരെ സംശയത്തിലാഴ്ത്തിയ ‘കുക്കറമ്മ’ ആരെന്നോ?
- 'എനിക്കിനിയൊരു സ്വാഭാവിക ജീവിതം ഉണ്ടാകില്ലെന്ന് ന്യൂറോ സര്‍ജന്‍ അന്ന് വിധിയെഴുതി'; ശ്രീജ പറയുന്നു
- ഈ ശബ്ദം കാവ്യ മാധവന്‍റേയോ ദിവ്യ ഉണ്ണിയുടെയോ, അതോ...; പ്രേക്ഷകരെ കണ്‍ഫ്യൂഷനാക്കിയ 'കുക്കറമ്മ' ആര്?
