= Anne Amie =

Indian playback singer

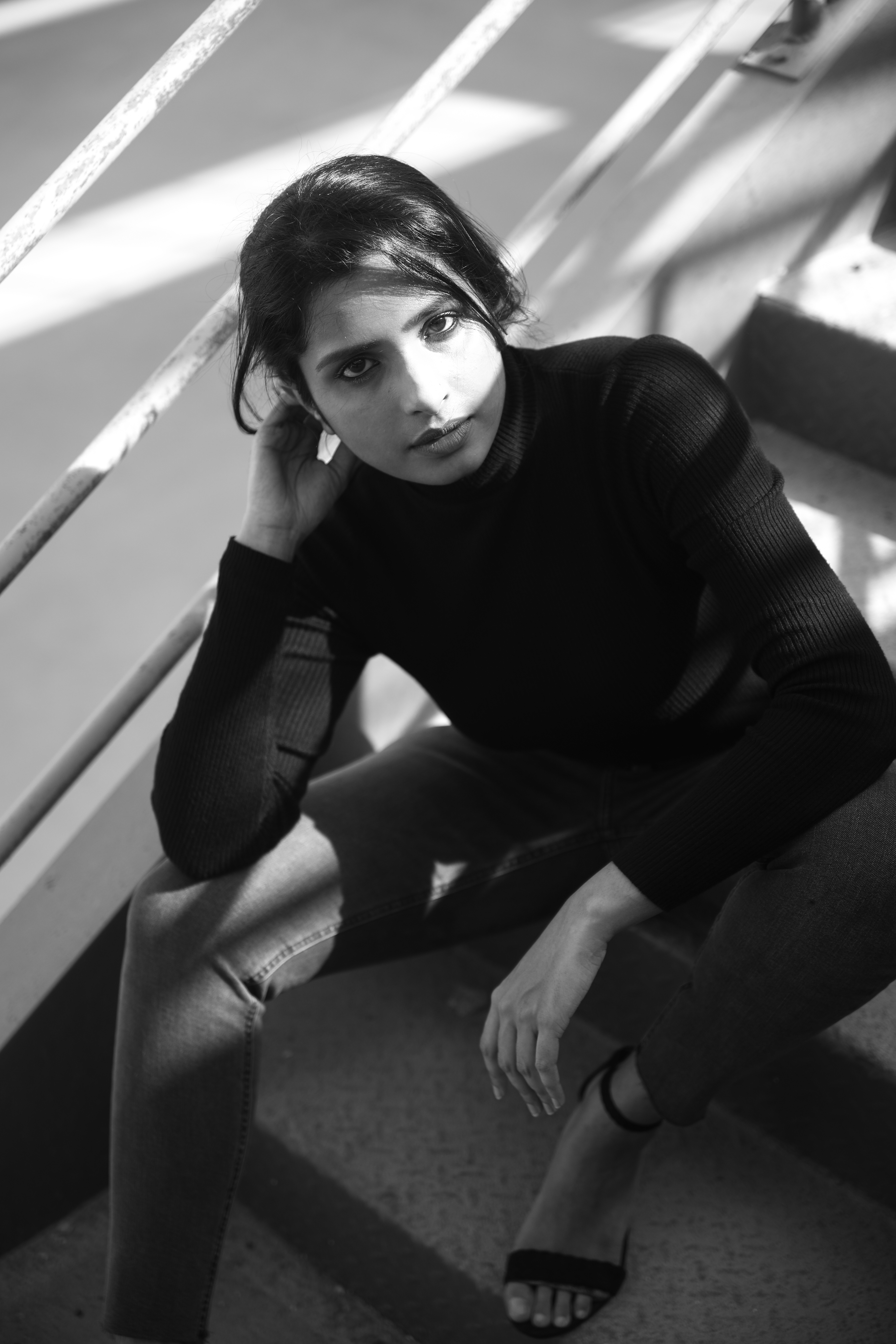

Background information
- Born: 25 February; Thrissur, Kerala, India
- Occupations: Playback singer; voice artist
- Years active: 2016–present

Anne Amie (born 25 February) is an Indian playback singer and voice artist. She marked her debut in playback singing with the solo 'Ethu Meghamaari – Reprise' for the film Kochavva Paulo Ayyappa Coelho. She received her first Filmfare Award in 2019 for the song 'Aararo' from the movie Koode. She also won the Kerala State Film Award for Best Singer in 2023 for the song 'Thinkal Poovin' from Pachuvum Athbutha Vilakkum.

She debuted as a voice artist in malayalam cinema in 2020, dubbing for Kalyani Priyadarshan in Varane Avashyamund.

== Early life and education ==
Anne Amie started singing at the age of 7. She was awarded first prize in Kerala State CBSE Youth Festival's Light Music competition in the Sub-Junior Category in the year 2000, while she was studying at 'Bharatiya Vidya Bhavan, Thrissur'.

She did most of her schooling in Dubai, her alma mater being 'Our Own English High School, Dubai'. During this time, she was a regular at youth festivals and was awarded 'Kalathilakam' four times. She used to take part in multiple categories such as Light Music Malayalam and Hindi, Carnatic Music, Malayalam Poetry Recitation, Mappilapattu etc.

She did her BBA from Christ University, Bangalore. She was part of the University's cultural team and in her final academic year, she was the University's Cultural Secretary, leading a cultural team of over 100 students.

She did her Master's in International Business from University of Wollongong in Dubai and graduated as 'Top Graduate' of her batch. She was also a recipient of the "Dubai Academic Excellence Award", given that she had scored the highest aggregate across all the master's degree courses at the University.

== Career ==
She was one of the 42 finalists in the music reality show, 'Idea Star Singer – Season 2' on Asianet. She was also one of the 7 finalists from Dubai in the music reality show, 'Indian Idol – Season 3'.

Prior to entering the film industry, she was working at the American multinational investment banking firm, Goldman Sachs, in their human capital management division. Post her post graduation, she was working at the American web services provider, Yahoo!, as a creative analyst, which is when she debuted in the playback singing field. She was juggling between both professions for almost a year until she decided to call it quits and focus on just one, i.e. her music and cinema journey.

She has worked with known music directors such as M. Jayachandran, Deepak Dev, Bijibal, Raghu Dixit, Shaan Rahman, Justin Prabhakaran, Gopi Sunder, Alphons Joseph, Ratheesh Vega, Jassie Gift, Shahabaz Aman, Afzal Yusuf, Mejo Joseph, Sushin Shyam, Hesham Abdul Wahab, Ifthi, Govind Vasantha, Vishal Chandrasekhar, Mujeeb Majeed, Neha Nair & Yakzan Gary Pereira, Arun Muraleedharan, William Francis, PS Jayhari, Mathews Pulickan, Varkey, Varun Sunil, Varun Krrishna, Rhithwik S. Chand, Ranjith Meleppat, A. R. Rakesh.

== Discography ==
=== 2015 ===
| Film | No | Songs | Composer(s) | Lyricist(s) | Co-artist(s) |
|---|---|---|---|---|---|
| Salt Mango Tree | 1 | "Kattummel" | Hesham Abdul Wahab | | Hesham Abdul Wahab |

=== 2016 ===
| Film | No | Songs | Composer(s) | Lyricist(s) | Co-artist(s) |
|---|---|---|---|---|---|
| Kochavva Paulo Ayyappa Coelho | 2 | "Ethu Meghamari" | Shaan Rahman | Vishal Johnson | |

=== 2017 ===
| Film | No | Songs | Composer(s) | Lyricist(s) | Co-artist(s) |
|---|---|---|---|---|---|
| Pullikkaran Staraa | 3 | "Kilivathilin Chare Nee" | M. Jayachandran | M. R. Jayageetha | |
| Paippin Chuvattile Pranayam | 4 | "Kayalirambilu" | Bijibal | Santhosh Varma | Bijibal |
| Chembarathipoo | 5 | "Pathidooram" | A. R. Rakesh | Jinil Jise | A. R. Rakesh |
| Chembarathipoo | 6 | "Akaleyai Evideyo" | A. R. Rakesh | Jinil Jise | Haricharan |
| Cappuccino | 7 | "Engane (Electro Dream Version)" | Hesham Abdul Wahab | Venu V Desam | Uday Ramachandran |

=== 2018 ===
| Film | No | Songs | Composer(s) | Lyricist(s) | Co-artist(s) |
|---|---|---|---|---|---|
| Aravindante Athidhikal | 8 | "Aanandhame" | Shaan Rahman | B. K. Harinarayanan | Vineeth Sreenivasan |
| Orange Valley | 9 | "Edan Vaniyile" | Rhithwik S. Chand | Vinayak Sashikumar | |
| Koode | 10 | "Aararo" | Raghu Dixit | Rafeeq Ahammed | |
| Koode | 11 | "Koode Song" | Raghu Dixit | Shruti Namboodiri | Nakul Abhyankar |
| Oru Kattil Oru Paikkappal | 12 | "Kayalolam" | Bijibal | Santhosh Varma | Bijibal |

=== 2019 ===
| Film | No | Songs | Composer(s) | Lyricist(s) | Co-artist(s) |
|---|---|---|---|---|---|
| Nine | 13 | "Akale" | Shaan Rahman | B. K. Harinarayanan | Harib Hussain |
| Nine | 14 | "Vicharamo" | Shaan Rahman | B. K. Harinarayanan | |
| Ilayaraja | 15 | "Spelling Bee" | Ratheesh Vegha | Jyotgish. T. Kashi | |
| Janaadhipan | 16 | "Ennadi Kalyani" | Mejo Joseph | Anil Panachooran | Vineeth Sreenivasan |
| Kumbalangi Nights | 17 | "Uyiril Thodum" | Sushin Shyam | Anwar Ali | Sooraj Santhosh |
| June | 18 | "Adyam Thammil" | Ifthi | Vinayak Sasikumar | Sooraj Santhosh |
| Gagulthayile Kozhiporu | 19 | ''Aadyathe Nokkil'' | Bijibal | Vinayak Sasikumar | Bijibal |
| Adhyarathri | 20 | "Njanennum Kinavu" | Bijibal | Santhosh Varma | Renjith Jayaraman |
| Puzhikkadakan | 21 | "Ponveyilin" | Ranjith Meleppat | Rafeeq Ahammed | Vijay Yesudas |
| Thenkashikattu | 22 | "Arum Kanathe" | Rhithwik S. Chand | | Vineeth Sreenivasan |
| Stand Up | 23 | "Mathivarathe" | Varkey | Bilu Padmini Narayanan | Rithu Vyshak |

=== 2020 ===
| Film | No | Songs | Composer(s) | Lyricist(s) | Co-artist(s) |
|---|---|---|---|---|---|
| Varane Avashyamund | 24 | "Aadyamorilam" | Alphons Joseph | Santhosh Varma | |
| Back Packers | 25 | "Snehithanevide" | Sachin Shankor Mannath | Jayaraj | |

=== 2021 ===
| Film | No | Songs | Composer(s) | Lyricist(s) | Co-artist(s) |
|---|---|---|---|---|---|
| Anugraheethan Antony | 26 | "Ee Nadhi" | Arun Muraleedharan | Manu Manjith | Adheef Muhamed |
| Thinkalazhcha Nishchayam | 27 | "Payyaram" | Mujeeb Majeed | Nidheesh Nadery | K. S. Harisankar |

=== 2022 ===
| Film | No | Songs | Composer(s) | Lyricist(s) | Co-artist(s) |
|---|---|---|---|---|---|
| Bro Daddy | 28 | "Kaana Kuyile" | Deepak Dev | Vinayak Sasikumar | Evugin |
| Meri Awas Suno | 29 | "Pranayamennoru Vakku" | M. Jayachandran | B. K. Harinarayanan | |
| Simon Daniel | 30 | "Ithale Ithale" | Varun Krrishna | Vinayak Sasikumar | Abhijith Damodaran |
| Sita Ramam | 31 | ''Thirike Vaa'' | Vishal Chandrashekhar | Vinayak Sasikumar | Kapil Kapilan |
| Sreedhanya Catering Service | 32 | "Nee Viral" | Mathews Pulickan | Aleena | Mithun Jayaraj |
| Padavettu | 33 | "Mazha Pattu" | Govind Vasantha | Anwar Ali | Govind Vasantha |
| 1744 White Alto | 34 | "Theeye" | Mujeeb Majeed | Haritha Haribabu | |
| Lalitham Sundaram | 35 | "Nostalgic Melody – Kannadi Koodum Kootti" | | | |

=== 2023 ===
| Film | No | Songs | Composer(s) | Lyricist(s) | Co-artist(s) |
|---|---|---|---|---|---|
| Momo In Dubai | 36 | "Vaa Paravakale" | Jassie Gift | B. K. Harinarayanan | |
| Enthada Saji | 37 | "Doorangale" | William Francis | Swathy Das | |
| Pachuvum Athbutha Vilakkum | 38 | "Thinkal Poovin" | Justin Prabhakaran | Manu Manjith, Raj Shekhar | |
| 1001 Nunakal | 39 | "Oro Manavum" | Neha Nair, Yakzan Gary Pereira | Anwar Ali | |
| Kaathal – The Core | 40 | "Neeyanen Aakasham" | Mathews Pulickan | Jacquiline Mathew (Norma Jean) | |

== Filmography ==
=== As Voice Artist ===
| Year | Film | No | Director | Actress | Character |
|---|---|---|---|---|---|
| 2020 | Varane Avashyamund | 1 | Anoop Sathyan | Kalyani Priyadarshan | Nikki |
| 2020 | Sufiyum Sujatayum | 2 | Naranipuzha Shanavas | Aditi Rao Hydari | Sujata |
| 2021 | Tsunami | 3 | Lal & Lal Jr. | Aradhya Ann | Anna |
| 2021 | Nizhal | 4 | Appu N. Bhattathiri | Divya Prabha | Shalini |
| 2021 | Bhramam | 5 | Ravi K. Chandran | Raashii Khanna | Anna |
| 2021 | Kaaval | 6 | Nithin Renji Panicker | Rachel David | Rachel |
| 2022 | Meppadiyan | 7 | Vishnu Mohan | Anju Kurian | Renuka |
| 2022 | Bro Daddy | 8 | Prithviraj Sukumaran | Kalyani Priyadarshan | Anna |
| 2022 | Salute | 9 | Rosshan Andrrews | Diana Penty | Dia |
| 2022 | Lalitham Sundaram | 10 | Madhu Warrier | Deepti Sati | Simy |
| 2022 | Ottu | 11 | Fellini T. P. | Eesha Rebba | Kalyani |
| 2022 | Sita Ramam (Malayalam) | 12 | Hanu Raghavapudi | Mrunal Thakur | Sita |
| 2023 | RDX: Robert Dony Xavier | 13 | Nahas Hidayath | Aima Rosmy Sebastian | Simi |
| 2024 | Pavi Caretaker | 14 | Vineeth Kumar | Swathi Konde | Maya (letters only) |

== Awards ==
| Year | Award | Category | Film | Nominated song | Result |
|---|---|---|---|---|---|
| 2017 | Asiavision Movie Awards 2017 | New Sensation in Singing | Pullikkaran Staraa | "Kilivathilin Chare Nee" | Won |
| 2018 | KBO Movie Awards 2017 | Best Singer (Female) | Pullikkaran Staraa | "Kilivathilin Chare Nee" | Won |
| 2018 | Mangalam Music Awards 2018 | Best Female Singer | Pullikkaran Staraa | "Kilivathilin Chare Nee" | Won |
| 2018 | Mirchi Music Awards South 2017 | Upcoming Female Vocalist of the Year 2017 | Pullikkaran Staraa | "Kilivathilin Chare Nee" | Won |
| 2018 | Red FM Malayalam Music Awards 2018 | Best Duet | Paippin Chuvattile Pranayam | "Kayalirambilu" | Nominated |
| 2018 | NANA Best of 2018 | Best Female Singer | Koode | "Aararo" | Won |
| 2019 | Movie Street Film Awards 2019 | Best Singer (Female) | Aravindante Athidhikal | "Aanandhame" | Won |
| 2019 | Mazhavil Music Awards 2019 | Best Duet Song | Kumbalangi Nights | "Uyiril Thodum" | Won |
| 2019 | Mazhavil Music Awards 2019 | Best Playback Singer Female | Koode | "Aararo" | Nominated |
| 2019 | Mazhavil Music Awards 2019 | Best Song | Kumbalangi Nights | "Uyiril Thodum" | Nominated |
| 2019 | 11th Vayalar Ramavarma Film Awards | Best Female Singer | Koode, Kumbalangi Nights | "Aararo" & "Uyiril Thodum" | Won |
| 2019 | Red FM Malayalam Music Awards 2019 | Superhit Duet Singer | Kumbalangi Nights | "Uyiril Thodum" | Won |
| 2019 | SIIMA | Best Playback Singer (Female) – (Malayalam) | Koode | "Aararo" | Nominated |
| 2019 | 66th Filmfare Awards South | Best Playback (Female) – Malayalam | Koode | "Aararo" | Won |
| 2019 | #GaanaPlayback2019 | Top Artist – Malayalam | | | |
| 2020 | Movie Street Film Awards 2020 | Best Playback Singer (Female) | Kumbalangi Nights, Nine | "Uyiril Thodum" & "Akale" | Nominated |
| 2020 | JC Daniel Rajaratna Awards | Best Playback Singer (Female) | Kumbalangi Nights | "Uyiril Thodum" | Won |
| 2020 | Mirchi Music Awards South 2020 | Female Vocalist of the Year | Kumbalangi Nights | "Uyiril Thodum" | Nominated |
| 2020 | Mirchi Music Awards South 2020 | Song of the Year | Kumbalangi Nights | "Uyiril Thodum" | Nominated |
| 2020 | Mirchi Music Awards South 2020 | Album of the Year | Kumbalangi Nights | "Uyiril Thodum" | Won |
| 2020 | Mirchi Music Awards South 2020 | Listeners' Choice Song of the Year | Kumbalangi Nights | "Uyiril Thodum" | Won |
| 2020 | Mirchi Music Awards South 2020 | Viral Song of the Year | Kumbalangi Nights | "Uyiril Thodum" | Won |
| 2021 | Mirchi Music Awards | Listeners' Choice – Song of the Decade | Kumbalangi Nights | "Uyiril Thodum" | Won |
| 2021 | Mollywood Flicks Award 2021 | Best Playback Singer (Female) | Kumbalangi Nights, Anugraheethan Antony | "Uyiril Thodum" & "Ee Nadhi" | Won |
| 2021 | Mazhavil Music Awards 2021 | Best Duet Song | Puzhikkadakan | "Ponveyilin" | Nominated |

== Sources ==
- Singer Anne Amie talks about new songs and dubbing career at ManoramaOnline
- Shaan Rahman's mentoring gave me confidence to be a playback singer at TOI
- New singer in the spotlight at Deccan Chronicle
- Singer Anne Amie is on a roll at Hindu
- Singer Anne Amie on dubbing for Kalyani Priyadarshan in Varane Avashyamund at Hindu
- Singer Anne Amie – I was offered the opportunity to dub for Kalyani in Varane Avashyamund while I was in Chennai for Filmfare Awards at TOI
- Interview with singer Anne Amie on dubbing in Varane Avashyamund at ManoramaOnline
- Until Next Time with Hrushee | Anne Amie – Concept Interview
- Exclusive Interview with Anne Amie | Part 1/2 | Tharapakittu | Kaumudy TV
- Exclusive Interview with Anne Amie | Part 2/2 | Tharapakittu | Kaumudy TV
- Anne Amie on Super Women | Women's Era | ChannelD
- Chat with singer Anne Amie | Manorama News
- Anne Amie | Sunday Funday | Amrita TV
- Anne Amie | Joseph Annamkutty Jose | Mirchi Malayalam
