= Varane Avashyamund =

2020 Indian film

- Theatrical release poster
- Directed by: Anoop Sathyan
- Written by: Anoop Sathyan
- Produced by: Dulquer Salmaan
- Starring: Suresh Gopi; Dulquer Salmaan; Shobana; Kalyani Priyadarshan
- Cinematography: Mukesh Muraleedharan
- Edited by: Toby John
- Music by: Alphons Joseph
- Production companies: Wayfarer Films; M Star Entertainments
- Distributed by: Play House Release
- Release date: 7 February 2020
- Running time: 145 Minutes
- Country: India
- Language: Malayalam

Varane Avashyamund (transl. Groom wanted) is a 2020 Indian Malayalam-language romantic comedy film written and directed by Anoop Sathyan (in his directorial debut). It was produced by Dulquer Salmaan under the banner of Wayfarer Films. The film stars Suresh Gopi, Shobana, Dulquer Salmaan and Kalyani Priyadarshan. It has music by Alphons Joseph. Set in Chennai, It revolves around the people and happenings in an apartment complex in the city. It explores love, life, family and relationships.

On 12 April 2019, it was reported that Suresh Gopi, Shobana and Nazriya Nazim will be starring in a film directed by debutant Anoop Sathyan, son of veteran filmmaker Sathyan Anthikad. Later, Nazriya was replaced by Kalyani Priyadarshan. It was later reported that Dulquer Salmaan will also be starring in the film and producing it. The principal photography took place between October and December 2019 in and around Chennai. The music was composed by Alphons Joseph. The film has cinematography by Mukesh Muraleedharan and editing by V. S. Vinayak.

Varane Avashyamund was marketed as the comeback film of Suresh Gopi after a five-year hiatus from acting; actress Shobana's Malayalam comeback after a 7-year absence since her last Malayalam film, Thira (2013), as well as Kalyani's Malayalam debut. The film was released in theatres worldwide on 7 February 2020 to positive reviews from critics praising the cast performances screenplay and direction. The film emerged as a commercial success grossing over ₹25 crore becoming the 4th highest grossing Malayalam film of the year. Varane Avashyamund made into the FC Gold list of films of Film Companion for the year 2021.

== Plot ==
Neena is a divorced woman in Chennai trying to get hired as a French tutor and teaching classical dance, and she has a daughter Nikhitha aka Nikki.Their next-door neighbors are Major Unnikrishnan, a retired Indian Army officer who has a pet dog, Jimmy (a brown doberman), and Bibeesh who lives with a serial-actress aunt and his young schoolgoing brother, Kartik.

Nikki is looking for a groom through a matrimonial portal and she is very picky. She keeps on rejecting all the alliances that come to her. She casually tells her friends that she once was attracted to a man named Aby but she did not pursue the relationship because his mother joked about her looks. Her friends message him from her phone when she was not around, and then the two start seeing each other again. Nikki also gets close with Aby's mother, Dr. Sherly.

Major Unnikrishnan has anger management issues and he starts going to Dr. Bose to get himself treated. Neena also goes to the same place to teach dance. Slowly they start a liking for each other. Noticing this, their flatmates start to gossip and soon Nikki hears about it as well. Nikki questions Neena, and she does not deny this. Nikki tells her fiancé about this and he immediately breaks up. Nikki starts hating her mother because of this. She tells Neena that, more than her fiancé, she misses his mother a lot.

Bibeesh is also in love with his colleague, but she already has a boyfriend. During this time, their flat becomes flooded, and Bibeesh and his brother shift to Nikki's house. Slowly they fall in love. One night Bibeesh and Kartik have a fight and Nikki stops the quarrel by taking Bibeesh to the top of the terrace.

Bibeesh opens up about his personal life to Nikki, recounting various incidents that have shaped his experiences. He recalls a time when his younger brother was born to their parents while he was in 11th grade, leading to mockery from his friends due to their mother being their class teacher. Tragedy struck a year later when Bibeesh's father died in an accident, as he was not wearing a helmet. Bibeesh vividly describes the day of his father's death as the worst, remembering how he usually carried an extra set of keys but had forgotten them that day, which forced him to wait at his neighbor's house, triggering a recollection of a nauseating experience when he vomited after drinking squash at their place. However, when the ambulance turned up at his house he was expecting to see his father's body in the van. But he saw his parents' dead bodies in the ambulance instead. They died while taking Kartik for a polio vaccination. They had got into an accident with a truck, but Kartik came home with a fracture only to which Bibeesh felt relieved on seeing his brother alive. Bibeesh reflects on how even the thought of that incident still evokes a sensation of nausea, illustrating the lasting impact it had on him.

His heartwrenching narrative of losing his parents during his school years helps Nikki understand the depth of maternal love and leads to a reconciliation between them. Meanwhile, Major Unnikrishnan humorously remarks that Neena bears a resemblance to the attractive actress Shobana, offering a lighthearted moment.

As the film nears its conclusion, Bibeesh and Nikki arrange to go on a date. However, their plans are disrupted when Nikki's ex-fiancé, a dedicated traffic police officer, unexpectedly shows up. This officer, who was previously rejected by Nikki for asking her to pay traffic fines during a date, unintentionally creates tension during their outing.

== Cast ==
- Suresh Gopi as Major Unnikrishnan, a retired army officer
- Dulquer Salmaan as Bibeesh P
  - Naslen as Young Bibeesh
- Shobhana as Neena, Nikki's single mother and French tutor
- Kalyani Priyadarshan as Nikhitha a.k.a. Nikki
- Urvashi as Dr. Sherly, a dentist and Aby's mother
- K. P. A. C. Lalitha as Akashavani, a former radio jockey and serial actress
- Lalu Alex as Manuel / Chachan
- Johny Antony as Dr. Bose
- Major Ravi as Major Athmaram
- Sarvajith Santosh Sivan as Karthik
- Rahul Rajasekharan as Aby, Nikita's ex-fiancee
- Meera Krishnan as House Owner's wife
- Sreeja Ravi as Maid
- Wafa Khatheeja Rahman as Wafa, Bibeesh's ex-girlfriend
- Krishnachandran Nair as Ranjan Shankar
- Vidya Menon Ahamed as Dhanya
- Theni Murugan as Gangaiyamaran
- Kimu Gopal as House Owner
- Baby Maheshwari as Young Nikitha
- Eldho as Bibeesh's father
- Nimisha as Bibeesh's mother
- Bibin Perumballikunnel as Serial Actor
- Sidharth Varma as Emil Varghese
- Siju Wilson as Alphonse Antony IPS (Cameo appearance)
- Arvind Venugopal as Guest Appearance in the Song "Nee Vaa En Aarumukha"
- Anoop Sathyan as Nikhitha's lover and also appears in the song "Kuttikurumba" (Cameo Appearance)
- Vineeth Sreenivasan as Adithyan Arun (Photo Appearance)
- Lal Jose as Sivaprasad (cameo appearance)
- Madhav Suresh Gopi as man at window during fight scene (cameo appearance)

== Production ==
On 12 April 2019, The Times of India reported that Suresh Gopi, Shobana and Nazriya Nazim will be starring in a drama film directed by debutant Anoop Sathyan, son of veteran filmmaker Sathyan Anthikad. It marked the comeback of the superstar Suresh Gopi, after a brief hiatus. Later, Nazriya was replaced by Kalyani Priyadarshan. On 17 September 2019, The New Indian Express reported that Dulquer Salmaan will also be starring in the film and producing it. Urvashi was also confirmed to play an important role. Filming was said to begin by October 2019 in Chennai, Tamil Nadu. The film also marked the on-screen collaboration of Suresh Gopi and Shobana after a period of 14 years, after working together in Makalkku (2005).

The principal photography of the film began on 1 October 2019 in Chennai, with both Dulquer and Kalyani shared pictures from sets on their social media accounts. The filming was officially launched by filmmaker Lal Jose. On 4 October 2019, Suresh Gopi began shooting his portions. Dulquer joined the sets for filming on 11 October 2019. On 26 November 2019, Urvashi's shooting for the film commenced. Filming was completed on 21 December 2019, with Dulquer shared a picture expressing thanks on Instagram. Bhagyalakshmi dubbed for Shobhana and Singer Anne Amie for Kalyani Priyadarshan.

== Soundtrack ==
Track listing
No.	Title	Lyrics	Music	Singer	Length
1.	"Ne Va En Arumukha..."	Santhosh Varma, Dr. Kritaya	Alphons Joseph	K. S. Chithra, Karthik	03:32
2.	"Kuttikkurumba..."	Santhosh Varma, Anoop Sathyan	Alphons Joseph	K. S. Chithra
3.	"Mullapoove ..."	Santhosh varma	Alphons Joseph	Haricharan	02:50
4.	"Muthunne Kannukalil ..."	Santhosh varma	Alphons Joseph	Swetha Mohan, Swetha Somasundaran
5.	"Mathi kanna Ullathu Chollan ..."	Santhosh varma	Alphons Joseph	Alphons Joseph, Sherdhin, Shelton Pinheiro, ThirumaLi
6.	"Oh En Eesa Song ..."	Dr:Kritaya	Alphons Joseph	Alphons Joseph
7.	"Aadyamorillam ..."	Santhosh varma	Alphons Joseph	Ann Amie
8.	"Muthunne Kannukalil ..."	Santhosh varma	Alphons Joseph	Swetha Mohan
9.	"Oh En Eesa ..."	Dr:Kritaya	Alphons Joseph	Alphons Joseph

== Release ==
The film was released on 7 February 2020. The movie was released on Netflix and Sun NXT on 20 April 2020 with English subtitles.

== Reception ==
=== Critical reception ===
On the review aggregator website Rotten Tomatoes, 100% of 5 critics' reviews are positive, with an average rating of 6.3/10.

Writing for Film Companion, Baradwaj Rangan wrote, "Its hardest to play heavy scenes in a light mannar, and these actors do it marvellously. The director chooses to discard the microscopic detailin favour of broad arcs and happy-making vingettes."

Gautham Sundar of The Hindu wrote, "Varane Avishyamund succeeds in capturing the city's (Chennai) essence and vibe like no other movie, not even Tamil ones, in recent times. Granted, it's set in a largely urbane environment, but its depiction of many Chennai staples — that we have forgone over the course of the lockdown — is so spot-on, that it's easy to look past its minor flaws." He further wrote, "Then, we have Shobana and Suresh Gopi of course, two veteran stars at the peak of their prowess, effortlessly adding dignity and empathy to their nuanced characters. Watching their blossoming (romance?) relationship is a delight to witness, though it is hampered by the other story arcs cutting in and the constraints of a feature film's length." He concludes calling the film a "winsome love-letter to Chennai."

A critic from The Times of India rated 3 out of 5 stars and wrote "Anoop makes a fine debut and the script has enough cute and endearing moments throughout its 145-minute duration to always keep a smile on the audience's faces. But that's not where the film's strength lies, it's in the moving moments when each of the four characters talk about their past." The critic praised Suresh Gopi and Shobhana, writing "Shobana hardly seems to have missed a beat, despite being away from Mollywood for seven years. As the confident Neena, she owns every frame she is in. Suresh Gopi does the same that you almost wonder why he has stayed away so long. The veterans show that be it humour or touching moments, they know how to ace the game." They conclude writing "Varane Avashyamund is a feel-good movie for all audience and probably all seasons, because it is all heart."

=== Box office ===
In the overseas opening weekend, it grossed US$93,932 (₹67.06 lakhs) from 44 screens in the United States, US$13,215 (₹9.44 lakhs) from 8 screens in the Canada, NZ$16,353 (₹7.52 lakhs) from 6 screens in New Zealand and S$7,920 (₹4.07 lakhs) from 2 screens in the Singapore. It grossed US$174,538 (₹1.3 crore) in United States in five weeks, US$22,537 (₹16.27 lakhs) in Canada in two weeks, £62,690 (₹58.25 lakhs) in United Kingdom in two weeks, A$4,016 (₹1.91 lakhs) in Australia in three weeks, NZ$22,849 (₹10.39 lakhs) in New Zealand in two weeks, €3,240 (₹2.59 lakhs) in Germany in three weeks and S$12,450 (₹6.67 lakhs) in Singapore in three weeks.

== Awards ==
At 10th South Indian International Movie Awards, Shobana won Best Actress, Anoop won Best Debut Director, Kalyani won Best Debut Actress, and Antony won Best Actor in a Comedy Role.
