= Goodalochana =

- Directed by: Thomas Sebastian
- Screenplay by: Dhyan Sreenivasan
- Story by: Anoop Joseph
- Produced by: Ajaz Ibrahim
- Starring: Dhyan Sreenivasan; Aju Varghese; Sreenath Bhasi; Hareesh Kanaran; Mamta Mohandas
- Cinematography: Akhil George
- Edited by: Sandeep Nandakumar
- Music by: Songs: Shaan Rahman; Gopi Sundar; Background Score: Gopi Sundar
- Production company: Izaan Pictures
- Distributed by: Adam's World of Imagination
- Release date: 3 November 2017
- Country: India
- Language: Malayalam

Goodalochana (transl. Conspiracy) is a 2017 Indian Malayalam-language comedy drama film directed by Thomas Sebastian and written by Dhyan Sreenivasan from a story by Anoop Joseph. The film stars Dhyan Sreenivasan, Aju Varghese, Sreenath Bhasi, and Hareesh Perumanna, along with Alencier Ley Lopez and Niranjana Anoop. The music was composed by Shaan Rahman along with Gopi Sundar

== Plot ==
The film is about the life of four unemployed youths from Kozhikode, named Varun, Prakashan, Ajaz and Jamsheer, who have a lot of expectations in their life and are looking for an opportunity to be successful. All their ventures lead to failures. They start different businesses, including a taxi company by pledging their homes. They amass huge debt and later use a painting that Varun's father has looked after as a prized possession on the pretext that it will fetch them a lot of money. That effort also turns in vain and they have ventured into new opportunities. Later, Ajaz tries to triplicate the money his father gave him to go to Dubai to work with a racket and gets cheated. The story ends saying that the four youngsters are still struggling with their lives to get settled. Varun's father Das has a famous painting in his cafe. The gang steals this painting and sells it for five lakhs. Das tells them that the painting is worth a crore and tricks them into buying back the painting from Padma, an art buyer for galleries, and keeps it back in the cafe. Das scolds them and the friends split up after a huge fight. The friends are now enemies and Varun and artist Prakashan get calls asking for a Bos painting, which is Prakashans signature. Varun calls Padma offering to sell a Bos painting and goes to Kochi to meet her. The painting is of their friendship and shows all their friends against an ocean backdrop. Padma offers them a space to exhibit the painting at her exhibition. They attach a price tag of ten lakh rupees, believing it will solve all their debt. The other friends also arrive in Kochi. The exhibition starts but the painting fails to sell. Padma takes it off their hands. She reveals that she knew Prakash was Bos all along and that he is a talented painter. She pays them a handsome amount of ten lakhs. They repay their friends all the debts. All of them meet up and reunite.

== Cast ==
- Dhyan Sreenivasan as Varun
- Niranjana Anoop as Fida
- Aju Varghese as Prakashan
- Sreenath Bhasi as Ajaz
- Hareesh Kanaran as Jamsheer
- Vishnu Govindan as Sharaf
- Alencier Ley Lopez as Das
- Bhagath Manuel as Atthar
- Mamta Mohandas as Padma Raghuram

== Production ==
The film was produced by Dr. Ajas Ibrahim. It marks the debut of Dhyan Sreenivasan as a screenwriter. It was written based on a story by Anoop Joseph.

== Soundtrack ==
The music was composed by Shaan Rahman along with Gopi Sundar.

No.	Title	Singer(s)	Length
1.	"Koyikkodu"	Abhaya Hiranmayi
2.	"Ee Angaadi Kavalayil"	Shaan Rahman
3.	"Daivame"	Arun Gopan, Sachin Raj, Midhun V Dev
4.	"Idea Theme"	Mithun Jayaraj, Uday Ramachandran, Sudheesh Kumar
5.	"Koyikkodan Football Theme"	Mithun Jayaraj, Uday Ramachandran, Sudheesh Kumar, Sachin Raj
6.	"Hai Business Theme"	Uday Ramachandran, Sudheesh Kumar, Ajay Sathyan, Ziya Ul Huq
7.	"Bhaiyya"	Arun Gopan, Sachin Raj, Midhun V Dev
8.	"Lalamalamalamalamale"	Arun Gopan, Sachin Raj, Midhun V Dev
9.	"Orappane Rakshappedum"	Mithun Jayaraj, Sachin Raj, Sudheesh Kumar, Ziya Ul Huq
10.	"Piriyukayano"	Arun Gopan, Sachin Raj, Midhun V Dev
11.	"Taxi"	Mithun Jayaraj, Uday Ramachandran, Abijith Anand, Ziya Ul Huq

== Release ==
Goodalochana was released on 3 November 2017.
