= Splash Corporation =

Philippine personal care company

- Logo used since 2010
- Trade name: Splash
- Formerly: RBH Cosmetics (1985-1986); Hortaleza Cosmetics (1986-1987); Splash Cosmetics (1987-1991); Splash Manufacturing Corporation (1991-2001)
- Type: Private (1985–2007, 2016–2019); Public (2007–2016); Subsidiary (since 2019)
- Traded as: PSE: SPH (2007–2016)
- Industry: Personal care
- Founded: September 30, 1985; 41 years ago
- Founders: Dr. Rolando B. Hortaleza; Dr. Rosalinda A. Hortaleza
- Headquarters: Bonifacio Global City, Taguig, Metro Manila, Philippines
- Area served: Worldwide
- Key people: Neeraj Khatri (Chairman and CEO); Veneranda M. Tomas (President and COO)
- Products: Soaps; Lotions; Shampoos; Deodorants; Cosmetics; Fragrances; Cleaning agents
- Parent: Wipro Enterprises
- Divisions: Splash International
- Website: splash.com.ph

Splash Corporation, commonly known as Splash (stylized in lowercase), is a Philippine personal care company headquartered in Bonifacio Global City, Taguig. It is a subsidiary of Indian conglomerate Wipro Enterprises.

== History ==
The company was founded in 1985 by Rolando B. Hortaleza and his wife Rosalinda Ang-Hortaleza and originally as a cosmetic store.

In 2007, Splash Corporation was listed on the Philippine Stock Exchange, with its listing having lasted until 2016.

In 2019, Indian company Wipro Enterprises acquired Splash Corporation from the Hortaleza family.

== Brands ==
=== Current brands ===
- Flawlessly U (formerly Extract)
- Hygienix
- Kolours
- Maxi
- Maxi-Peel
- MaxKleen
- Shades by Kolours
- SkinWhite
- Stylex (formerly Control)
- Vitress
- Extraderm
- Enchanteur (distribution)
- Bio Science

=== Former brands ===
- AccuHerb
- Baby Spa
- Biolink
- Barrio Fiesta
- Coconut Manila
- Crispy Joy
- Coconut Water
- Peanut Butter
- Extract VCO
- Hiyas
- LiveMore
- Nutress
- Moondish
- Maxi-Peel Zero
- TheraHerb
- Tricks
- VCO Manila
- Splash Direct Sales
- Splash Classics
- Splash Cologne
- Vitasoft
- Sanicyd
- Splash Styling Aids
- Cover & Clean
- Splash Pemona
- Balance Shampoo
- Deowhitener

== See also ==
- Gisada
- Symrise
