= T. V. Anupama =

Indian Administrative Service officer

T. V. Anupama IAS

Personal details
- Born: Anupama T. V. 17 October 1986 (age 40) Maranchery, Ponnani, Malappuram, Kerala, India
- Spouse: Clintson Paul
- Children: 1
- Education: B.E., Electronics Engineering from BITS Pilani, Goa Campus
- Occupation: Special secretary of the local self-government department (LSGD) on 01 June 2024.

T. V. Anupama (born 17 October 1986) is an Indian Administrative Service (IAS) officer of the 2010 batch assigned to the Kerala cadre.She served as the 43rd District collector of Thrissur. In 2010, Anupama secured fourth rank in the Civil Services Examination. She is known for her bold steps against politically powerful people. She served as district collector of Alappuzha district in 2017.Anupama currently special secretary of the local self-government department (LSGD) on 1 June 2024.

== Early life ==
Anupama hails from Ponnani in Malappuram district of Kerala. She is the elder daughter of late Parayerikkal Balasubramanian and Ramani. Her father was a Circle Inspector of Kerala Police and her mother was an engineer with the Guruvayur Devaswom Board. She has one younger sister, Nisha. Anupama is married to Clinston Paul since June 2013.

== Education ==
Anupama studied at Vijayamatha Convent High School, Ponnani and St. Clair's Higher Secondary School, Thrissur. She passed the 10th Grade examination with 13th rank and 12th grade with 3rd rank. After schooling she did BE (Hons) in Electronics Engineering, at BITS, Pilani's Goa campus. During third year of the BE course, Anupama attended a month-long crash course in Malayalam at a coaching center at Pala. After finishing her BE (Hons), she started Civil Services preparations before the preliminary examinations. She attended a six-month coaching program at ALS Training Institute in New Delhi and at the Civil Services Academy of the State government in Thiruvananthapuram.

Anupama elected for geography and Malayalam as her subjects for the Civil Services Examination. She secured fourth rank in the Examination.

== Career ==
In 2014, she was appointed as Food Safety Commissioner. She got a party leader arrested on the charge of demanding ‘Nokkukooli’. She collected over 6,000 samples of adulterated food samples during her random checks across the state. On 3 September 2015, Anupama ordered the ban of manufacturing, storage and sale of spices sold by Nirapara brand after they were found to have more than the permissible quantity of starch. She was removed from Food Safety Commissioner and was transferred to Social Justice Department on 6 November. In 2016 she took charge as the director of the Social Justice Department, Kerala. She became Director of Scheduled tribes Development Department, Government of Kerala on 2 September 2021. Appointed as Land and Revenue commissioner on 24 November 2022.She is also given additional charges of Disaster Management Commissioner and Cyclone Risk Mitigation Project Manager.

=== District Collector ===
In 2017 August, Anupama took charge as district collector of Alappuzha district and served as district collector.

Anupama became collector of Thrissur on 7 June 2018. During the Kerala floods, she coordinated rescue operations and updated the public about the situation. When the Bar Association refused to give permission to use of their premises inside the civil station, Anupama ordered workers to break the room locks to store essential supplies. Anupama effectively used social media to address issues, especially in the affected parts of district. In July 2019 she stepped down to undergo training at the Lal Bahadur Shastri National Academy of Administration in Mussoorie.
