= ID – The Fake =

2025 Malayalam film

- Directed by: Arun Sivavilasam
- Written by: Arun Sivavilasam
- Produced by: Muhammed Kutty
- Starring: Dhyan Sreenivasan; Divya Pillai; Indrans
- Cinematography: Faisal Ali
- Edited by: Riyas K. Badhar
- Music by: Nihal Sadiq
- Production company: Essa Entertainments
- Release date: 3 January 2025
- Running time: 114 minutes
- Country: India
- Language: Malayalam

ID: The Fake is a 2025 Indian Malayalam-language thriller film written and directed by Arun Sivavilasam. The film stars Dhyan Sreenivasan, Divya Pillai, Indrans, and Kalabhavan Shajon in key roles.

== Plot ==
The narrative follows Vinod, the main character, a food delivery worker whose life is upended when a manipulated image of his wife Gauri goes viral online. As he struggles with the emotional and social consequences, Vinod sets out to uncover the truth behind the incident.

== Cast ==
- Dhyan Sreenivasan as Vinod
- Divya Pillai as Gauri
- Indrans
- Kalabhavan Shajohn
- Johny Antony
- Jasnya Jayadeesh

== Production ==
It is produced by Mohammed Kutty under the banner of Essa Entertainments.

== Release ==
The film was released theatrically in India on 3 January 2025. The film streaming OTT release on Saina Play.

== Reception ==
Onmanorama noted that the film addresses the timely issue of cybercrime and praised Dhyan Sreenivasan's performance, but criticised its predictable narrative.

The Indian Express observed that it was one of several smaller releases that failed to make a significant impact critically or commercially in a competitive release period.
