= Wipro Enterprises =

Indian conglomerate

Wipro Enterprises Private Limited

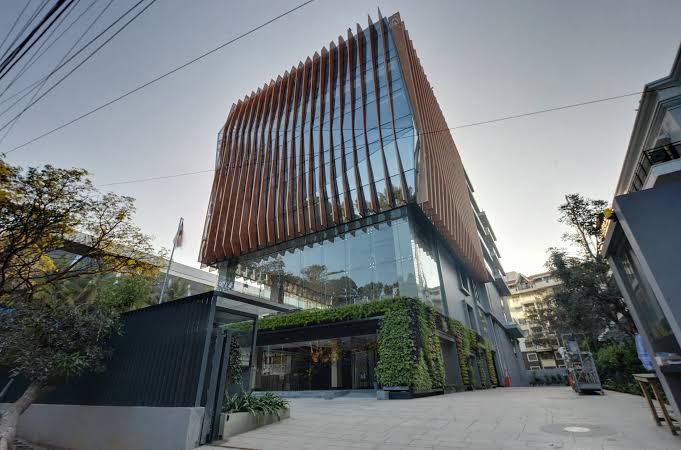
- Headquarters in Bengaluru
- Type: Private
- Founded: March 31, 2013; 13 years ago
- Founder: Azim Premji
- Headquarters: Bengaluru, Karnataka, India
- Area served: Worldwide
- Key people: Azim Premji (Chairman); Vineet Agrawal (CEO-Consumer Care & Lighting); Pratik Kumar (CEO-Infrastructure Engineering)
- Revenue: ▲₹16,934 crore (US$1.8 billion) (FY24)
- Net income: ▲₹1,903 crore (US$200 million) (FY24)
- Number of employees: 15,000 (2022)
- Divisions: Wipro Consumer Care; Wipro Infrastructure Engineering
- Subsidiaries: Splash Corporation; Canway Corporation
- Website: wiproenterprises.com

Wipro Enterprises Private Limited is an Indian multinational company primarily operating in the fast-moving consumer goods (FMCG), lighting, hydraulic cylinders, industrial automation, 3D printing, aerospace component manufacturing, and industrial water treatment sectors. The company is predominantly owned by Azim Premji, his associates, and charitable trusts linked to the Premji family. It was established in 2013 after the demerger of the non-IT business divisions of Wipro Limited.

== Subsidiaries ==
The company has two major verticals

=== Wipro Consumer Care and Lighting (WCCLG) ===
Wipro Consumer Care and Lighting (WCCLG) operates in the fast-moving consumer goods (FMCG) and Lighting sector. It focuses on personal care, home care, lighting, and seating products. Founded in 1945 as Western India Vegetable Products Limited, the company initially produced vegetable oil under the brand "Sunflower Vanaspati" and later expanded into laundry bars with the "787" brand. Over time, it diversified into personal care offerings, including toilet soap brands such as Santoor, Chandrika, Aramusk, and Yardley Its home care portfolio includes Wipro Safewash, Softouch, Maxkleen, and Giffy.

Notably, Santoor ranks among the top-selling soap brands in South India.

Wipro Lighting was established in 1992, the company designs and manufactures lighting solutions for commercial, institutional, industrial, and outdoor applications. Wipro Lighting offers a wide range of products, including LED luminaires, smart lighting systems, and energy-efficient solutions, and has been recognized for its focus on innovation, sustainability, and workplace lighting design.

In 2023, WCCLG achieved a revenue milestone of ₹10,000 crore (US$1.0 billion).

==== Acquisitions ====
- 2003: Acquired the Glucovita brand from Hindustan Lever (now Hindustan Unilever).
- 2004: Purchased Chandrika soap brand.
- 2006: Acquired Northwest Switches for ₹102.2 crore.
- 2007: Bought Singapore-based Unza Holdings for ₹1,010 crore.
- 2009: Acquired the India and Middle East business of Yardley (undisclosed sum).
- 2011: Acquired Aramusk and the global business of Yardley.
- 2013: Purchased Singapore's L D Waxsons for ₹790 crore.
- 2016: Acquired China's Zhongshan Ma Er.
- 2019: Took over Splash Corporation (Philippines) and Canway Corporation (South Africa).
- 2022: Acquired Nirapara, a Kerala-based spices brand.

==== Wipro Consumer Care Ventures ====
In September 2019, WCCLG launched Wipro Consumer Care Ventures, a corporate venture capital arm to invest in startups across India and Southeast Asia. By 2022, the fund had invested in seven Indian companies, including direct-to-consumer (D2C) brands. In March 2022, it expanded its portfolio by investing in a Singapore-based venture capital fund.

=== Wipro Infrastructure Engineering (WIN) ===
Wipro Infrastructure Engineering (WIN) specializes in the field of industrial engineering & manufacturing, it has expertise in hydraulics, aeronautics, water treatment, automation solutions and 3D printing. It has been involved in the manufacturing of hydraulic cylinders, truck cylinders, aerospace parts and related components since its establishment in 1976 as part of Wipro Limited. It supplies these industrial components to global original equipment manufacturers (OEMs).

In 2011, it formed a joint venture with Kawasaki Precision Machinery (India) Pvt. Ltd. to produce hydraulic pumps for excavators. In 2017, it partnered with Israel Aerospace Industries (IAI) to manufacture composite aerostructure parts and assemblies. In 2018, it launched the Industrial Automation vertical as a new business segment.

Wipro 3D, a subsidiary under WIN, provides metal additive manufacturing and 3D printing services.

In 2021, the company inaugurated a new aerospace manufacturing facility in Bengaluru, Karnataka.

In 2025, the company announced the launch of a new business division - Wipro Electronic Materials, dedicated to manufacturing Copper Clad Laminate (CCL) for Printed Circuit Boards (PCBs). A new manufacturing facility would be established to produce over 6 million sheets of Cooper clad laminates and corresponding pre-impregnated materials.

==== Acquisitions ====
- 2006: Acquired Sweden-based Hydrauto Group AB for ₹142.6 crore.
- 2011: Purchased Brazil-based hydraulic cylinder manufacturer RKM Equipamentos Hidráulicos.
- 2013: Acquired Romania's SC Hervil SA, a manufacturer of hydraulic cylinders.
- 2016: Took over Israel-based Gijon HR to expand its aerospace portfolio.
- 2019: Acquired Incite Cam's automation business.
- 2020: Purchased Pune-based industrial automation company Precision Automation and Robotics India (PARI).

== Social initiatives ==
Wipro Enterprises, along with Wipro Limited and the Azim Premji Foundation, pledged ₹1,125 crore in 2020 to address the COVID-19 pandemic, supporting healthcare infrastructure, migrant workers, and vaccination efforts.

The Santoor Scholarship Programme, initiated by Wipro Enterprises, focuses on education for underprivileged girls in the states of Karnataka, Telangana, and Andhra Pradesh.

Wipro Cares, the corporate social responsibility (CSR) arm of Wipro Enterprises, works in areas such as education, primary healthcare, environmental sustainability, and disaster rehabilitation.
