= Chandrika (soap) =

Brand of herbal soap

Chandrika is a brand of herbal soap owned by Bangalore-headquartered Wipro Enterprises. It was launched in 1940 and previously manufactured and sold in India by Kerala-based SV Products, founded by, C. R. Kesavan Vaidyar. In 2003, marketing rights for Chandrika was acquired by Wipro Consumer Care and Lighting from SV Products.

== Ingredients ==
According to the company, the ingredients in Chandrika soap are coconut oil, caustic soda (with higher percentage), wild ginger, lime peel oil, hydnocarpus oil, orange oil, and sandalwood oil. Each is claimed to have a particular medicinal value.
