= Pei Kottu =

2025 Indian film by S Lavanya

- Theatrical release poster
- Directed by: S Lavanya
- Written by: S Lavanya
- Produced by: S Lavanya
- Starring: S Lavanya; Deepa Shankar; Sreeja Ravi; Shanthi Anandaraj
- Cinematography: S Lavanya
- Edited by: S Lavanya
- Music by: S Lavanya
- Production company: Om Sai Productions
- Release date: 21 March 2025
- Country: India
- Language: Tamil

Pei Kottu (transl. Ghost bite) is a 2025 Indian Tamil-language horror comedy film directed by S Lavanya. The film stars S Lavanya and Deepa Shankar in the lead roles, alongside Sreeja Ravi and Shanthi Anandaraj. The film was produced by S Lavanya under the banner of OM Sai Productions.

== Cast ==
- S Lavanya as Kavya and Shruti
- Deepa Shankar as Deepa
- Sreeja Ravi as Raji
- Shanthi Anandaraj as Bindu

== Production ==
31 crafts of the films were done by S Lavanya inducing editing, direction and production.

== Reception ==
Maalai Malar critic stated that "Lavanya is praised for trying to do all the 24 arts in the film industry." Virakesari critic stated "The director can be praised for creating the story of the film in a way that creates awareness about the sexual exploitation of women in the film industry."
