= Aap Kaise Ho =

Aap Kaise Ho?
- Theatrical release poster
- Directed by: Vinay Jose
- Written by: Dhyan Sreenivasan
- Produced by: Manuel Cruz Darwin; Amjith
- Starring: Sreenivasan; Dhyan Sreenivasan; Aju Varghese; Ramesh Pisharody; Saiju Kurup; Sudheesh; Tanvi Ram
- Cinematography: Akhil George
- Edited by: Vinayan M. J.
- Music by: Songs: Varkey; Dawn Vincent; Background Score: Anand Madhusoodanan; Varkey
- Production company: Fantastic Films
- Distributed by: Fantastic Films
- Release date: February 28, 2025 (India)
- Running time: 100 minutes
- Country: India
- Language: Malayalam
- Budget: ₹2.5 crore

Aap Kaise Ho? is a 2025 Indian Malayalam-language crime comedy film directed by Vinay Jose and written by Dhyan Sreenivasan. It stars Sreenivasan, Dhyan Sreenivasan, Aju Varghese, Ramesh Pisharody, Saiju Kurup, Sudheesh, and Tanvi Ram. The film is based on true events which revolves around a chaotic bachelor party that leads to unexpected moral dilemmas. The film was a Box office bomb.

== Plot ==
Christy prepares for his wedding when friends Binoy and Sajeer organize a bachelor party. The night turns chaotic when two sex workers arrive, and Christy becomes involved in helping one of them, leading to an encounter with corrupt police officers. The events jeopardize Christy's wedding and test his relationships and morals.

== Cast ==
- Sreenivasan
- Dhyan Sreenivasan as Christy
- Aju Varghese
- Ramesh Pisharody
- Saiju Kurup
- Sudheesh
- Tanvi Ram
- Jeeva Joseph
- Surabhi Santosh
- Divyadarshan

== Production ==
The film began shoot in September 2021. In December 2022, it was reported that Sreenivasan return to screen post-surgery with a script by his son Dhyan Sreenivasan and direction by Vinay Jose. Production credits include Manuel Cruz Darwin and Amjith as producers, cinematography by Akhil George, editing by Vinayan M. J., music by Anand Madhusoodanan and Dawn Vincent.

== Release ==
The trailer of the film released on 23 February 2025. The film was scheduled to release on 21 February 2025 but got postponed for one week. The film released worldwide on 28 February 2025.

== Reception ==
=== Critical response ===
The film received negative reviews from critics. Onmanorama praised the grounded tone and situational humour, highlighting Dhyan Sreenivasan, Aju Varghese, and Ramesh Pisharody’s performances, while noting weak balance between comedy and tension. The Times of India rated it 1/5, commenting, "A confused, meandering narrative that struggles to find its tone." The New Indian Express gave 1.5/5, calling it "a film that mistakes stale for funny" and criticized its uninspired writing and lack of genuine humour. The Indian Express criticised it's weak screenplay and boring scenes.

== Soundtrack ==
Music was composed by Anand Madhusoodanan and Dawn Vincent.
