= Dhyan Sreenivasan =

Indian actor (born 1988)

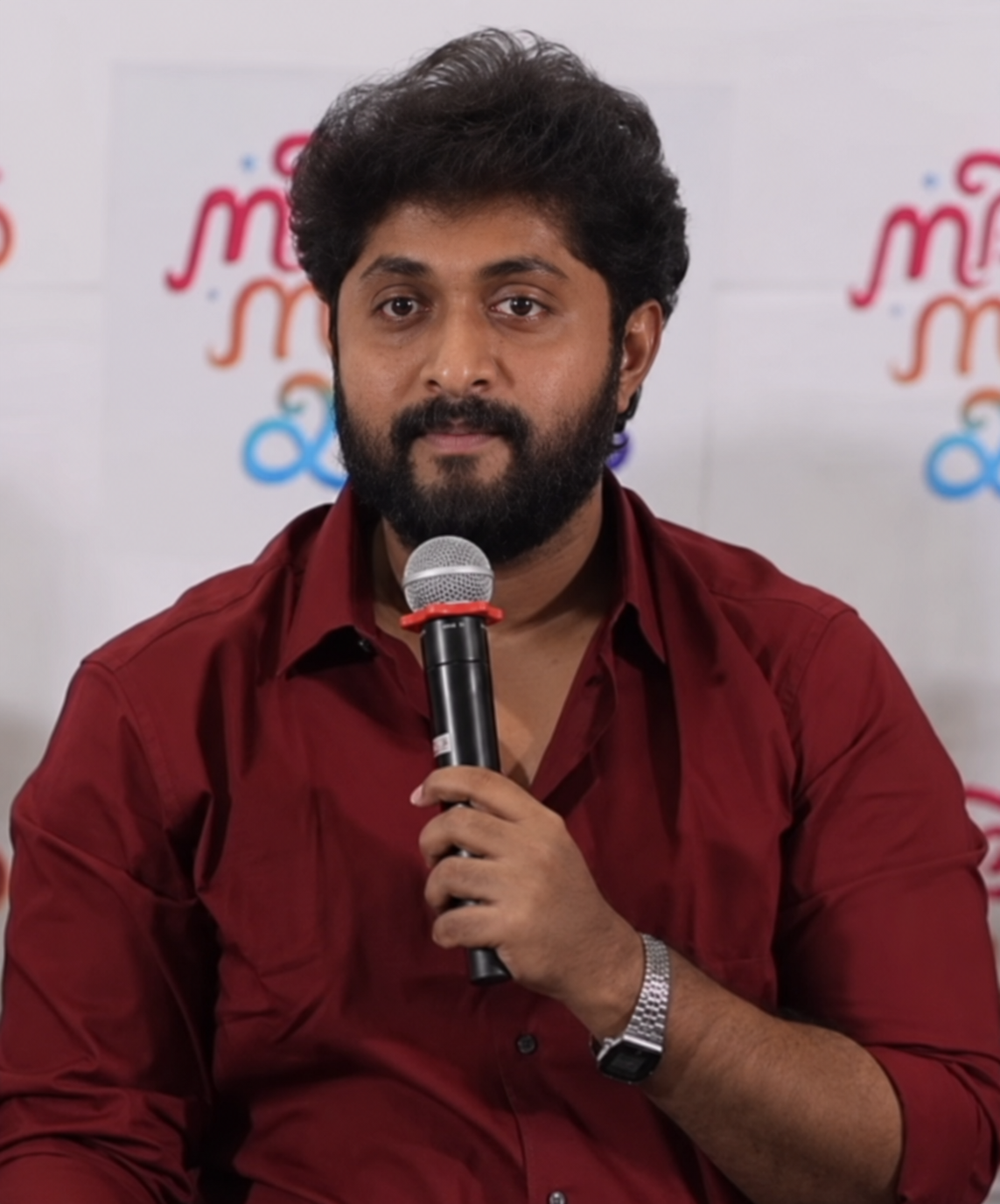
- Dhyan in 2023
- Born: 20 December 1988 (age 37); Kuthuparamba, Kannur district, Kerala
- Occupations: Actor, Film Director
- Years active: 2013–present
- Spouse: Arpita Sebastian (m. 2017)
- Children: 1
- Father: Sreenivasan
- Relatives: Vineeth Sreenivasan (brother); M. Mohanan (uncle)

Dhyan Sreenivasan (born 20 December 1988) is an Indian actor, film director, screenwriter and producer recognized for his films in the Malayalam cinema. He made his acting debut with Thira (2013), directed by his elder brother Vineeth Sreenivasan. He made his directorial debut with Love Action Drama (2019).

== Early life ==
Dhyan Sreenivasan was born on 20th of December 1988. He is the younger son of the late actor, director, and screenwriter Sreenivasan and the younger brother of actor and director Vineeth Sreenivasan, who also works in Malayalam films.

== Career ==
Dhyan debuted in 2013, with the Malayalam film Thira directed by his brother. In the film, he played a supporting role along with two-time National Award winning actress Shobana. His performance in the film was generally well received by critics and the audience. He made his directorial debut with Love Action Drama (2019) which was a commercial success. After that, his acting career was followed by a steady decline with a series of unsuccessful films except Varshangalkku Shesham (2024).

== Personal life ==
Dhyan Sreenivasan married his longtime girlfriend, Arpita Sebastian, on 7 April 2017.

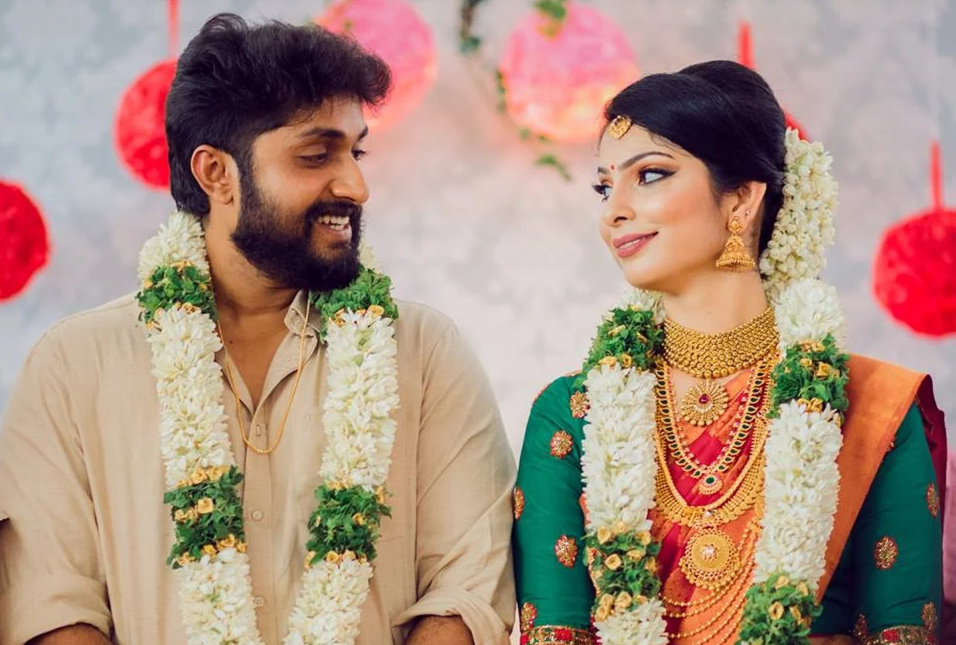
Dhyan Sreenivasan with Arpita Sebastian at their marriage in 2017.

== Filmography ==
=== As actor ===
- All films are in Malayalam language unless otherwise noted.

Key
†	Denotes films that have not yet been released

List of Dhyan Sreenivasan acting credits
Year	Title	Role	Notes	Ref.
2013	Thira	Naveen		
2015	Kunjiramayanam	Lalu		
2015	Adi Kapyare Kootamani	Bhanu Prasad		
2016	Mudhugauv	Tribal Gang Member	Cameo appearance	
2016	Ore Mukham	Zachariah Pothen		
2017	Goodalochana	Varun	Also screenwriter	
2019	Kuttymama	Shekharankutty		
2019	Sachin	Sachin		
2019	Love Action Drama	Himself	Special appearance	
2022	Sathyam Mathrame Bodhippikku	ACP James		
2022	Udal	Kiran		
2022	Prakashan Parakkatte	Suni	Also screenwriter	
2022	Sayanna Varthakal	Dennis		
2022	Veekam	Kiran		
2023	Khali Purse of Billionaires	Bibin Vijay		
2023	Higuita	Ayyappadas		
2023	Janaki Jaane	Lishan	Cameo appearance	
2023	Jailer	Jailer Shantaram		
2023	Achan Oru Vazha Vechu	Ramesh Nambeessan	Cameo appearance	
2023	Nadhikalil Sundari Yamuna	Kannan		
2023	Cheena Trophy	Rajesh		
2023	Bullet Diaries	Raju Joseph		
2024	Iyer In Arabia	Rahul		
2024	Varshangalkku Shesham	Venu Koothuparambu		
2024	Malayalee from India	Malghosh		
2024	Nadikar	Himself	Cameo appearance	
2024	Kudumbasthreeyum Kunjadum	Jijo		
2024	Swargathile Katturumbu	Jose		
2024	Partners	Vishnu		
2024	Secret	Midhun		
2024	Super Zindagi	Sidharthan		
2024	Bad Boyz	SI Amjad Khan		
2024	Thrayam	Ashiq		
2024	Oshana	Father Sunny George Karimbarakkal		
2024	Anand Sreebala	Lalu	Cameo appearance	
2025	ID – The Fake	Vinod		
2025	Machante Maalakha	Adv. Gijo Thattumpuram		
2025	Aap Kaise Ho	Christy	Also screenwriter	
2025	Prince and Family	Jince		
2025	Detective Ujjwalan	Detective Ujjwalan		
2025	Thug CR 143/24		Cameo appearance	
2025	Raveendra Nee Evide?	Johnkutty		
2025	Odum Kuthira Chadum Kuthira	Itty		
2025	Vala: Story of a Bangle	Purushothamanan Nair		
2025	Bha Bha Ba	Godson Ancharakandy / “Interview Star”		
2025	Aghosham	Deepak		
2026	Bhishmar	Murugan		
2026	Kalyanamaram	Sajin		
2026	Secret of Kalinga			
2026	Vivaah			
2026	Joy Full Enjoy †	Joy	Filming	

=== As screenwriter, director and producer ===
As screenwriter, director and producer
Year	Title	Credited as	Notes
2017	Goodalochana	Screenwriter	
2019	Love Action Drama	Writer, Director	
2020	Mom and Son	Producer	Web series
2020	Kili	Producer	Web series
2021	Saajan Bakery Since 1962	Producer	
2022	Prakashan Parakkatte	Screenwriter	
2025	Aap Kaise Ho	Screenwriter	
TBA	9 MM	Screenwriter	

=== Television ===
List of television credits
Year	Title	Role	Channel	Ref.
2022	Star Magic	Mentor	Flowers TV	
2023	Cook with Comedy	Judge	Asianet	
2024-2025	Super Show	Judge	Zee Keralam	
