= Super Zindagi =

Indian Malayalam-language comedy drama film

- Theatrical release poster
- Directed by: Vintesh
- Written by: Abhilash Sreedharan (dialogues)
- Screenplay by: Prajith Raj EKR; Vintesh
- Produced by: Haseeb Meppat; Sathar Padannelakath
- Starring: Dhyan Sreenivasan; Mukesh; Parvati Nair; Dayyana Hameed
- Cinematography: Eldho Issac
- Edited by: Lijo Paul
- Music by: Sooraj S. Kurup
- Production company: 666 Productions
- Release date: 9 August 2024
- Country: India
- Language: Malayalam

Super Zindagi (transl. Super Life) is a 2024 Indian Malayalam-language comedy drama film directed by Vintesh and starring Dhyan Sreenivasan, Mukesh and Parvati Nair. The film was released on 9 August 2024.

== Cast ==
- Dhyan Sreenivasan as Sidharthan aka Sidhu
- Mukesh as Mujeeb
- Parvati Nair as Vidya
- Dayyana Hameed as Helen
- Johny Antony as Naji
- Suresh Krishna as Da Vinci
- Kalesh Ramanand as Ashok
- Mahendran as Javed
- Sreeja Ravi as Lekha
- Rithu Manthra as Archana

== Production ==
Principal photography for the film was completed in mid-2023.

== Reception ==
Vivek Santhosh of The New Indian Express rated the film 1/5 and wrote, "Unimaginatively staged, the narrative quickly becomes a tiresome slog with stale humour and forgettable performances". Anandu Suresh of The Indian Express gave the film the same rating and wrote, "Despite its efforts to capitalise on the Mukesh-ness (his knack for turning even simple lines into humorous ones) and the Dhyan-ness (his ability to give the hero a boy-next-door appeal), Super Zindagi falters throughout due to shoddy writing". Rohit Panikker of Times Now rated the film 2.5/5 stars and wrote, " From the characterization to the story's narrative, Super Zindagi is a rather uneventful experience. Although it is a well-presented film in terms of its visuals, editing and soundtrack, the technical excellence does very little to bolster the weak storytelling".
