= Yardley London =

British personal care company

Yardley of London Limited
- Trade name: Yardley London
- Company type: Private limited company
- Industry: Personal care
- Founded: 1770; 256 years ago
- Founder: Samuel Cleaver (1770); William Yardley (1823)
- Headquarters: London, England, UK
- Products: Perfumery and toiletries Fine fragrances Soap bars Body wash Talcum powder Oral care
- Parent: Wipro Enterprises
- Website: yardleylondon.co.uk

Yardley London (commonly known as Yardley) is a British brand of personal care products, and it is one of the oldest companies in the world to specialise in cosmetics, fragrances and related personal care items. Established in 1770, the firm became a major producer of soap and perfumery by the beginning of the 20th century.

By 1910, the company had moved to London's upmarket Bond Street, and Yardley received its first Royal Warrant in 1921. Today, the company holds two Royal Warrants. Since 2009, Yardley has been owned by Wipro Enterprises, an Indian multinational conglomerate.

== History ==
The business was established by the Cleaver family in 1770, which is the official date displayed on its product labels. According to the company's website, an earlier incarnation existed prior to this, but most records of the earlier business were lost in the Great Fire of London in 1666.

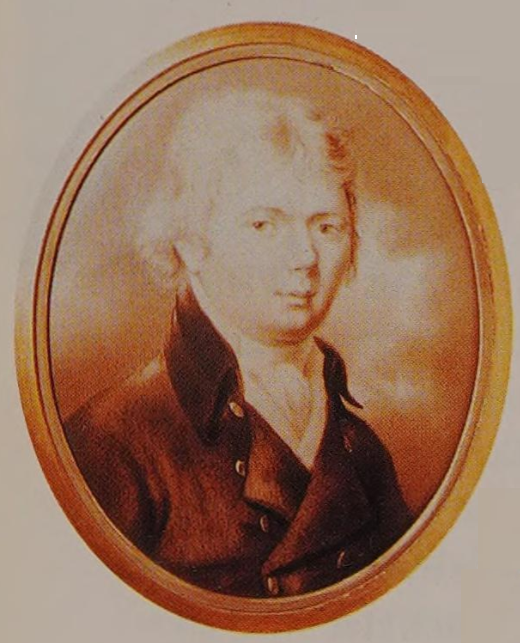
William Yardley

The company is named after William Yardley, who purchased the business in 1823 from the sons of the founder, Samuel Cleaver, who had gone into bankruptcy. The business became known as Yardley & Statham in 1841 when Charles Yardley, son of William, took on William Statham as a partner in the business. At the time, the firm sold perfumes, soaps, powders, hair pomades and other toiletries.

In 1851, the firm, which was still known as Yardley & Statham, exhibited at the Great Exhibition in The Crystal Palace. That same year, the firm changed its name to Yardley & Co. The firm exhibited soap and perfume, including a soap called Old Brown Windsor, which was embossed with a picture of Windsor Castle and was one of their first production soaps.

In 1913, the firm adopted Francis Wheatley's Flowersellers painting, from his Cries of London series, as its new logo. The primula vulgaris being sold in baskets in the painting were replaced, in the logo, with sheaths of lavender.

Yardley English Lavender Talcum Powder

Yardley's signature scent is English Lavender, which was launched in 1873. English Lavender was popular during the Victorian era in England, and it was exported to the USA during the 1880s, where it became popular in American households.

The variety of lavender that Yardley uses in its products is lavandula angustifolia, which is specially grown for Yardley in the south of England. Lavandula angustifolia was selected by the company in the 1930s, after a several year search for the finest variety.

Due to the growing popularity of Yardley soaps and cosmetics at the turn of the 20th century, the firm opened a shop in 1910 on Bond Street in London. The original Yardley shop on Bond Street was at 8 New Bond Street, but it later moved to 33 Old Bond Street.

Yardley was acquired in 1967 by British American Tobacco (BAT). That same year, British model Twiggy became the face of Yardley. The company sold "Twiggy Eyelashes," "Twiggy Paint," and other cosmetics with her as the spokesmodel. Yardley became a symbol of the Swinging Sixties and was associated with the 1960s British youth culture of miniskirts, Carnaby Street and mod fashions.

In 1970, Yardley was the title sponsor of British Racing Motors for two years, with the team racing as Yardley Team BRM. Yardley then moved to the then-Bruce McLaren Motor Racing in 1972, becoming the team's first title sponsor. The team raced as Yardley Team McLaren for three years. Part of the sponsorship deal with the two Formula One teams was black, gold and ochre stripes in a stylised "Y" painted on the car's bodywork.

In 1970, BAT organized its cosmetic businesses, which included Yardley, into British American Cosmetics. The cosmetics division was sold to Beecham Group in 1984. The following year, Yardley was sold to Wasserstein Perella & Co.

In 1991, Yardley introduced English Blazer, a range of men's grooming products.

To help update the company's old-fashioned image, Yardley signed up Canadian supermodel Linda Evangelista in September 1996 for a fee of $7.75 million. However, the project backfired when Yardley was placed into receivership in August 1998. That same year, Yardley was acquired by Wella.

In 2005, Lornamead acquired Yardley for £60 million. In 2013, Li & Fung Group (now Fung Group) acquired Lornamead.

In 2009, Wipro Consumer Care and Lighting acquired Yardley from Lornamead for certain markets (Asia, Middle East, Australasia, as well as North and West Africa) for $45.5 million. In 2012, Wipro purchased the UK-European division from Lornamead, with the exception of Germany and Austria, where Lornamead remains the owner/rights holder.

In 2010, Bollywood actress Katrina Kaif was made the brand ambassador for Yardley in India.

== Royal Warrants ==
Yardley has had a long association with the British Royal Family and has been awarded the Royal Warrant of Appointment (UK) six times. The company has supplied several British monarchs with toiletries.

- 1921 – Edward, Prince of Wales; Perfumers and fine soap makers
- 1932 – Queen Mary; Perfumer
- 1949 – George VI; Purveyors of soap
- 1955 – Elizabeth II; Manufacturers of soap
- 1960 – Queen Elizabeth, The Queen Mother; Perfumers and manufacturers
- 1995 – Charles III; Manufacturers of toilet preparations

== See also ==
- David Montgomery, 2nd Viscount Montgomery of Alamein
