= Kalesh Ramanand =

Indian actor

- Born: 4 November 1990 (age 35); Alappuzha, Kerala, India
- Education: Rajagiri School of Engineering & Technology (BTech)
- Occupation: Actor
- Years active: 2013–present

Kalesh Ramanand is an Indian actor who predominantly works in Malayalam and Tamil films. He is best known for his role as Selva in the 2022 Malayalam film Hridayam.

== Personal life ==
Kalesh Ramanand was born in Alappuzha, Kerala, India. He completed a BTech in Computer Science from the Rajagiri School of Engineering & Technology in Kochi, Ernakulam. After finishing his studies, he moved to Chennai to attend theatre workshops.

== Career ==
Kalesh debuted in the 2013 Malayalam film Kunjananthante Kada. He also made his Tamil debut in the 2015 film, Thani Oruvan.

== Filmography ==
=== Films ===
Year	Title	Role	Language	Ref.
2013	Kunjananthante Kada	Suku	Malayalam	
2015	Thani Oruvan	Kumar	Tamil	
2016	Kerala Paradiso	Naveen	Malayalam	
2019	Thelivu	Adv. Ramanujam	Malayalam	
2021	Maara	Kishore	Tamil	
2022	Hridayam	Selva	Malayalam	
2022	Gargi	Pazhani	Tamil	
2023	Christopher	Sudeep Rajan	Malayalam	
2023	Neeraja	Anumohan	Malayalam	
2023	Imbam	Manoj	Malayalam	
2023	Neru	Vinod	Malayalam	
2024	Varshangalkku Shesham	Indradhanush	Malayalam	
2024	Secret	Moorthy	Malayalam	
2024	Super Zindagi	Ashok	Malayalam	
2025	Kaadhal Enbadhu Podhu Udamai	Ravindra	Tamil	
2025	Vadakkan	Narayanan	Malayalam	
2025	Faces †	Michael	Malayalam	

== Nominations ==
Year	Award	Film	Result	Ref.
2023	SIIMA Award for Best Debutant Actor - Malayalam	Hridayam	Nominated	
