= Secret (2024 film) =

Indian film

- Directed by: S. N. Swamy
- Written by: S. N. Swamy
- Produced by: Rajendra Prasad
- Starring: Dhyan Sreenivasan; Aparna Das; Renji Panicker; Ranjith; Jacob Gregory; Kalesh Ramanand
- Cinematography: Jackson Johnson
- Edited by: Basodh T. Baburaj
- Music by: Jakes Bejoy
- Production company: Lakshmi Parvathy Vision
- Release date: 26 July 2024
- Running time: 119 minutes
- Country: India
- Language: Malayalam

Secret is a 2024 Indian Malayalam-language comedy thriller film written and directed by screenwriter S. N. Swamy (in his directional debut). The film stars Dhyan Sreenivasan, Aparna Das, Jacob Gregory, Kalesh Ramanand, Renji Panicker, and Ranjith. The film's cinematography and editing was handled by Jackson Johnson and Basodh T Baburaj respectively. The film's soundtrack was composed by Jakes Bejoy.

The film was released on 26 July 2024. The film mostly received negative reviews from the critics upon release and was a box office bomb. This film is one of the biggest failures of Swamy's career.

== Cast ==
- Dhyan Sreenivasan as Mithun
- Aparna Das as Amaya
- Jacob Gregory as Prince
- Kalesh Ramanand as Moorthy
- Ardra Mohan as Shreya
- Ranjith as Mathews
- Sminu Sijo as Mathews wife
- Renji Panicker as MLA
- Manikuttan as Harishankar
- Thalaivasal Vijay as Astrologer
- Jayakrishnan as Madhu
- Abhiram Radhakrishnan as Faizi
- G. Suresh Kumar as Harish

== Music ==
No.	Title	Lyrics	Singer(s)	Length
1.	"Maayajaalakkara"	Vivek Muzhakkunnu	Karthika R Kumar, Vishnu S Kurup	2:23

== Release ==
The trailer was released on July 18 2024. It began streaming on ManoramaMAX on November 24 2024.

== Reception ==
Anandu Suresh of Indian Express wrote - "This review will be short; probably the shortest I have ever written. Mainly because there’s no way I can write about Secret, renowned screenwriter SN Swamy’s debut directorial venture, for long without it sounding like a rant. Yet, I will give it a go and be as diplomatic as possible"

The film did very bad in the theatres and the OTT release further led to more negative critics. For S. N. Swamy, Secret has outdone all his poor works till now, with its sloppy writing, abysmal performances, forgettable technical aspects and overall lacklustre nature.
