= Bro Daddy =

2022 Indian film

- Official release poster
- Directed by: Prithviraj Sukumaran
- Written by: Sreejith N.; Bibin Maliekal
- Produced by: Antony Perumbavoor
- Starring: Mohanlal; Prithviraj Sukumaran; Meena; Kalyani Priyadarshan
- Cinematography: Abinandhan Ramanujam
- Edited by: Akhilesh Mohan
- Music by: Deepak Dev
- Production company: Aashirvad Cinemas
- Distributed by: Disney+ Hotstar
- Release date: 26 January 2022
- Running time: 160 minutes
- Country: India
- Language: Malayalam

Bro Daddy (stylized as BRO DADᗡY) is a 2022 Indian Malayalam-language comedy-drama film directed by Prithviraj Sukumaran and produced by Antony Perumbavoor through Aashirvad Cinemas, with screenplay by Sreejith N. and Bibin Maliekal. The film stars Mohanlal and Prithviraj Sukumaran in the lead roles along with Meena, Kalyani Priyadarshan, Lalu Alex, Kaniha, Jagadish, Mallika Sukumaran, Soubin Shahir, and Unni Mukundan in supporting roles. The songs and background score for the film were composed by Deepak Dev.

Principal photography began on 15 July 2021 in Hyderabad, Telangana. Filming lasted 44 days, concluding on 6 September 2021. Bro Daddy released on Disney+ Hotstar on 26 January 2022 to positive reviews.

== Plot ==
The plot focuses on two affluent Christian families in Kerala: John is the owner of Kattadi TMT steel bars, a business which he has inherited from his late father Chacko Kattadi, a successful businessman and the founder of the steel company. His wife Annamma is a homemaker and their son Eesho is a sought-after creative director at a leading advertising company in Bangalore. John's childhood friend Kurian Maliekkal is a self-made man who grew from humble beginnings and runs an advertisement company. Maliekkal's wife Elsy is also a homemaker, and they have a daughter Anna, who works at an IT company in Bangalore.

Kurian has a history with Annamma; when he proposed to her, her father despised him for being a "nouveau riche" and chased him by unleashing their dog. He sometimes reminisces about this unrequited love and has named his daughter Anna after her. Nevertheless, the Kattadi and Maliekkal families now share a good bond. Though both John's and Kurian's families are settled in Kochi city, their roots are in Kottayam.

The families meet at the wedding reception of their friend Dr. Samuel's daughter. Samuel's son-in-law, Dr. Cyril plans to establish a maternity hospital network across India. Kurian hopes to grab its advertising campaign and presses Samuel. It's after a long time that Eesho and Anna are meeting up with their families. Kurian offers Eesho to be his company's creative director, but he declines. However, Elsy and Annamma are impressed by the kids and they think that the two of them would be a good pair. Annamma proposes this to John and Eesho, but Eesho rejects it as Anna and his mother has the same name and when he calls it both will respond and that it might create a confusion, to which John laughs. Elsy's proposal is also declined by Kurian and Anna. Eesho and Anna return to Bangalore, where it is revealed that Eesho and Anna are in a live-in relationship and it has been going on for a few years. As Eesho and Anna are enjoying their moments, John and Annamma are also enjoying a happy moment.

Things take a turn when Eesho and Anna learn that Anna is pregnant. Eesho initially enquires about abortion procedures but since Anna is against it, they finally decide to proceed. Now they are in a dilemma on informing their parents. Unexpectedly Eesho is called by John to visit Kerala at once, and he gets scared that his father somehow got the news of his girlfriend's pregnancy. But at home, he is greeted with the news that his mother is pregnant, which baffles Eesho. He pushes them for an abortion, but they also decide to keep it. Eesho informs Anna as well about this news. She asks Eesho to inform his parents about her pregnancy as well along the lines "He committed the same mistake as John" and affirms that there won't be any shocks in this case. John also tasks Eesho with informing their pregnancy to his mother (Eesho's grandmother). John and his family arrive at his ancestral home at Kottayam for attending the baptism of his brother's child. Kurian and Elsy also arrive there as invitees much to the shock of Eesho, who was planning to reveal everything to John and was not expecting Kurian there. Anna advises Eesho to talk to her father affectionately and break the ice between them. But the plan fails when Eesho accidentally spills achār on Kurian's clothes, much to the anger of Kurian. Meanwhile, John's mother figures out that Annamma is pregnant and is supportive. After multiple failed attempts, Eesho finally confronts John and discloses the matter, which really shocks John and Annamma. John devises a plan to sort things out without revealing anything to Kurian and Elsy. He promises Anna that they will ask her father for her hand in marriage.

Kurian wants to marry her off to someone in the advertising field as he fears his company has no heir since Anna is not into his business and his only hope for the company continuing in his family is through a son-in-law. John asks Kurian about the wedding. Kurian, who do not like Eesho initially disagrees, but later agrees as Anna has agreed to it. Meanwhile, unbeknownst to Eesho, John promises Kurian that Eesho will be his successor. Meanwhile, Samuel informs Kurian that Cyril has agreed to collaborate with Kurian's company if he can present an impressive ad concept. Elsy meanwhile figures out that Anna is pregnant and pushes for an early wedding date. Meanwhile, Kurian finds out through his friend Jameskutty that Eesho was in a live-in relationship and his pregnant partner was packed off by John, not realising that the girl who was pregnant is his own daughter. Shocked and enraged, Kurien breaks his friendship with John. When he finds that Anna had gone to meet Eesho, and he goes with Elsy to catch them.

John and Annamma arrives to tell Eesho and Anna that Kurian misunderstood them and John tries many attempts to reveal the truth, but Kurian doesn't listen to him and doesn't allow him to speak. When the drunk Eesho pokes fun at Kurian for showing off a silly matter, Kurian slaps Eesho and in the scuffle, Anna reveals that it is she who is pregnant with Eesho's child. Elsy, Annamma and John also say that they knew the truth and feared how to disclose it to Kurian. Heartbroken and tricked by his own family, Kurian leaves, but gradually copes up with reality and pardons Anna for tricking him. Eesho tries to make amends with Kurien and presents a catchy ad concept which Cyril approves, winning back the respect and friendship of Kurian. The wedding takes place in a grand ceremony with everyone's approval. During the wedding ceremony, Kurian reveals to everyone that he is going to be a grandfather and John also reveals that he is not only going to be a grandfather, but a father of one more child as well. Months later, in front of a labour room, a nurse calls for Anna's husband, to which both John and Eesho respond and stare at each other.

== Cast ==
- Mohanlal as John Chacko Kattadi, Owner of Kattadi TMT steel bars company, a successful businessman, Chacko's son, Eesho's father and Annamma's husband
- Prithviraj Sukumaran as Eesho John Kattadi, a creative director in an advertising company based in Bangalore, John's and Annamma's son, later Anna's husband
- Lalu Alex as Kurian G. Maliekkal, Owner of Maliekkal advertising company, Anna's father and Elsy's husband
- Meena as Annamma John Kattadi, John's wife and Eesho's mother (Voiceover by Devi S)
- Kalyani Priyadarshan as Anna Kurian, an IT professional based in Bangalore, Kurian's and Elsy's daughter, later Eesho's wife
- Kaniha as Elsy Kurian, Kurian's wife and Anna's mother (Voice Over By Vimmy Mariam George)
- Jagadish as Dr. Samuel Mathew, Cyril's Father-in-law and John's and Kurian's friend
- Soubin Shahir as Happy Pinto, a wedding planner
- Unni Mukundan as Dr. Cyril, Samuel's son-in-law
- Mallika Sukumaran as Chacko's widow, John's mother and Eesho's grandmother
- Charle as Venkayya, Eesho's and Anna's neighbour in Bangalore
- Antony Perumbavoor as SI Antony Joseph
- Nikhila Vimal as a nurse (Cameo)
- Jaffar Idukki as Fr. Edward Kulathakkal, church vicar
- Salam Bhukari as Pinto's assistant
- Dinesh Prabhakar as James Kutty, Kurian's family friend
- Sijoy Varghese as Paul, Eesho's boss
- Muthumani as Dr. Archana Menon, a gynecologist
- Sohan Seenulal as Kurian's office manager
- Kavya Shetty as Susan Mathews, Eesho's colleague
- Thumboor Shibu
- Sukumaran as Chacko Kattadi, John's late father, Eesho's late grandfather and the founder of Kattadi TMT Steel Bars Company (photo presence only)

== Production ==
=== Development ===
Empuraan was supposed to be Prithviraj Sukumaran's second directorial, sequel to his debut film Lucifer (2019). On 16 June 2021, Prithviraj revealed via Instagram that he liked a storyline written by his daughter Alankrita which he likes to direct, but put aside for another screenplay that he heard which can be made a film amid the COVID-19 restrictions. Two days later (on 18 June), Bro Daddy was announced as his second directorial, again with Mohanlal in the title role and produced by Antony Perumbavoor for Aashirvad Cinemas, which will also have himself in an equally important role. He described the film as a "fun family drama", written by Sreejith N. and Bibin Maliekal.

Prithviraj said that the kind of films produced during the pandemic period prompted him to take Bro Daddy, the pandemic forced filmmakers to make "contained films" that can be made within pandemic restrictions, "we are badly missing a happy film in Malayalam cinema over the past one and half year. All of the content we see in Kerala is dark. It's either a murder mystery or a dark satire or an investigative thriller", it was when he was thinking about this Sreejith and Maliekal approached him with the screenplay of Bro Daddy, "I found it to be interesting, hilarious and more than anything, I believe it will be a really enjoyable, light watch". He then narrated it to Mohanlal, who immediately agreed. The screenplay was bought by Prithviraj Productions.

=== Casting ===
Beside Mohanlal and Prithviraj, the rest of the cast billed in the title poster during the film's announcement were Kalyani Priyadarshan, Meena, Lalu Alex, Murali Gopy, Kaniha, and Soubin Shahir. Prithviraj called Unni Mukundan for the film while they were working on Bhramam. He also called Jagadish his other co-actor in Bhramam for a humorous role. Bro Daddy marks the Malayalam debut of Kannada actress Kavya Shetty and Tamil actor Charle. Prithviraj's mother Mallika Sukumaran was cast in the film as Mohanlal's mother.

=== Filming ===
Bro Daddy was scheduled to begin production only after Aashirvad Cinemas completes production of 12th Man which was supposed to begin on 5 July 2021, but held back after failing to obtain permission from the state government due to the restrictions pertaining to the COVID-19 pandemic. Hence, they decided to move ahead with Bro Daddy. However, Bro Daddy was denied permission to shoot in Kerala, which was originally planned to shoot entirely in the state, hence they had to move out of Kerala, which increased cost of production. Location scouting was complete by early July. Principal photography began on 15 July 2021 in Hyderabad, Telangana. First day of shoot took place at an IT Park, with scenes featuring Prithviraj and Kalyani. A total of 52-day shoot was charted for the film in Telangana. Mohanlal joined on 20 July. Since government granted permission to shoot films in Kerala from 18 July. It was shifted to Kerala after two more weeks of filming in Hyderabad. Filming was completed on 6 September 2021. It lasted 44 days. Cinematography was handled by Abinandhan Ramanujam.

== Music ==
Bro Daddy (Original Motion Picture Soundtrack)

Soundtrack album by Deepak Dev
- Released: 5 February 2022
- Recorded: August – December 2021
- Studios: Dev's Wonderland, Kochi
- Genre: Filmi
- Length: 15:57
- Language: Malayalam
- Label: Aashirvad Cinemas
- Producer: Antony Perumbavoor

Deepak Dev chronology
Djibouti (2021)	Bro Daddy (Original Motion Picture Soundtrack) (2022)	Twenty One Gms (2022)

Singles from Bro Daddy
- 1. "Parayathe Vannen" Released: 13 January 2022; 2. "Vannu Pokum (Title Song)" Released: 20 January 2022; 3. "Kaana Kuyile" Released: 1 February 2022

The film's songs and background score were composed by Deepak Dev. Bro Daddy, the soundtrack album, marks the launch of Aashirvad Cinemas' record label. The album contains four songs. The first single "Parayathe Vannen" was released online on 13 January 2022, sung by M. G. Sreekumar (for Mohanlal's portion) and Vineeth Sreenivasan (for Prithviraj's portion), with lyrics by Lakshmi Shrikumar. Vineeth recorded the song in August 2021. Sreekumar was not initially part of the song, but as a regular in Mohanlal films, he was chosen for his voice recognition. It was the first song composed for the film and its elements was also used in various sequences in the film and in trailer. The song features the romance between John and Annamma and also shows sequences of Eesho and Anna.

The song "Vannu Pokum" sung by Mohanlal and Prithviraj was released online on 20 January and shows snippets from their recording session. The original visuals of the song, placed in the opening credits, shows a comic strip video featuring a couple getting married at a young age and their newborn son. It was sketched by comic artist Bhaghya Babu. Dev proposed the idea to structure the song like a conversation between a father and son. He initially thought of bringing Yesudas and Vijay Yesudas to sing, but after composing, he felt that as a conversation it is best to hear it from the characters' voice. Mohanlal and Prithviraj recorded the song on 7 December 2021 at Dev's Wonderland, the recording studio of Dev at Kochi. It was recorded within two hours.

Bro Daddy (Original Motion Picture Soundtrack)
No.	Title	Lyrics	Singer(s)	Length
1.	"Parayathe Vannen"	Lakshmi Shrikumar	M. G. Sreekumar, Vineeth Sreenivasan	4:08
2.	"Vannu Pokum (Title Song)"	Madhu Vasudevan	Mohanlal, Prithviraj Sukumaran	3:49
3.	"Kaana Kuyile"	Vinayak Sasikumar	Evugin Emmanuel, Anne Amie	5:43
4.	"Theme of Bro Daddy"	Vinayak Sasikumar	Anand Sreeraj	2:17
Total length:				15:57

Additional tracks
No.	Title	Length
1.	"Parayathe Vannen - Instrumental"	4:07
2.	"Kaana Kuyile - Instrumental"	5:48

== Release ==
On 29 December 2021, it was confirmed that the film would be releasing directly on the OTT service Disney+ Hotstar on 26 January 2022.

== Reception ==
Janani K. of India Today rated 3.5 out of 5 stars and wrote that the film is "a delicious family drama with a lot of underlying messages. With excellent performances from an ensemble cast, the film is a rollicking comedy that can be enjoyed with your family ... Mohanlal is a hoot in this film. His minute expressions and his comic timing are impeccable. Prithviraj, as his son, too delivered a kickass performance ... Prithviraj Sukumaran has treated the story of Bro Daddy with the utmost care". In comparison, she said that Bro Daddy is "not Badhaai Ho, but better". Onmanorama also rated 3.5 out of 5 and wrote: "The storyline, which trails a simple and flawless plot, carves a smooth course to keep you thoroughly. engrossed. The dexterously crafted sequences, the coherent scenes and artfully realistic dialogues suggest how well the script has been churned out". Mohanlal "effortlessly juggles with expressions and handles situations in style ... the movie showcases the vibrancy and comic timings of vintage Mohanlal", while Prithviraj "displays an exceptional poise in comic timing" and Lalu Alex is "at his zealous", and also praised the rest of the cast.

Baradwaj Rangan writing for Film Companion said: "Bro Daddy is a sweet, silly, likeable, well-written comedy with lots of laughs. Things are woven very organically into the script and Prithviraj shines as a director ... It works because of the script. It works because of the way it’s been handled and because the cast works wonderfully. Mohanlal and Prithviraj share an amazing chemistry". Arjun Menon of Pinkvilla rated 3.5 out of 5 and stated that the film is "a superior product of the post lockdown phenomena of the spatially contained covid quickies, shot on a smaller budget with a fewer cast and never feels tampered down by the restrictions. The movie is in some way a litmus test just to see how much of the older sensibilities of the fun, jolly, escapist dramas works out for the content savvy millennials". Mohanlal "just oozes vitality and charm" whose "wide-eyed glances, naughty interludes that play out in full throttle coupled with the effortless body acting, orchestrated with flamboyant candour by a fanboy turned filmmaker, who knows how to show his icon on the screen". Anand Kochukudy of The Quint also rated 3.5 out of 5 and called it "a breezy, light-hearted comedy that ticks most of the boxes" and Mohanlal's role has "ample scope to tickle the funny bone of the audience". Even though, "there isn't much novelty to Bro Daddy but it still works as a fun and entertaining watch for a wide audience". He praised the acting of Mohanlal, Prithviraj, Lalu Alex and others, and the background score, but opined that the duration could have been trimmed.

Deepa Soman of The Times of India rated 3 out of 5 and "Bro Daddy keeps one interested in the proceedings right from the beginning. Prithviraj and Mohanlal offer some interesting moments of the equations between a son and dad, who don’t have much age gap between them. Lalu Alex has also tried to tickle our funny bones at various stretches in the film, in which Kalyani Priyadarshan’s characterisation, too, is refreshing. Deepak Dev’s music suits the mood of the movie quite well", but criticized the duration. Haricharan Pudipeddi of Hindustan Times wrote: "The film works to a large extent because it treats the subject in a light-hearted manner and it's the comical moments that help the film stay mostly entertaining". But he said the later half "meanders to some extent" but compensated by the performances, "Mohanlal charms his way through the movie with effortless performance. He nails those minute expressions with ease which make his character stand out. Prithviraj is equally good".
