= Sathyam Mathrame Bodhippikku =

2022 Malayalam films

- Theatrical release poster
- Directed by: Sagar
- Written by: Sagar
- Starring: Dhyan Sreenivasan; Sreejith Ravi; Sudheesh
- Cinematography: Dhanesh Raveendranath
- Edited by: Ajeesh Anand
- Music by: William Francis
- Production company: Smruthi Cinemass
- Release date: 14 January 2022 (India)
- Country: India
- Language: Malayalam

Sathyam Mathrame Bodhippikku is a 2022 Indian Malayalam-language crime thriller film written and directed by Sagar. It stars Dhyan Sreenivasan, Sudheesh, Rony David Raj, Sreejith Ravi, Ambika and Johny Antony. It was produced by Wichu Balamurali under the banner of Smruthi Cinemass and the music was composed by William Francis. It was released on 14 January 2022.

== Plot ==
James, a police officer investigates the murder case of a leading criminal lawyer but he did not know that the case will change his life

== Cast ==
- Dhyan Sreenivasan as James IPS
- Sudheesh as Professor Matthew Thomas
- Rony David Raj as Manu
- Sreejith Ravi as Advocate Sajan
- Ambika as Mary Varghese (Judge)
- Johny Antony as Resort Owner
- Sreevidya Mullachery as Sini Varghese

== Production ==
The film was completed in 2020 during the COVID-19 pandemic in Ernakulam.

== Reception ==
A critic from Samayam gave 3 stars out of 5 and wrote that "The story which could have been made into a great movie is made into an average viewing experience by the script's lack of solidity and laziness in the making." Akshay Krishna of OTTplay gave 1.5 out of 5 and stated that "Sathyam Mathrame Bodhippikku is the result of a filmmaker willing to sacrifice common sense, and logic to create a villain who is a mastermind. While nothing goes right in the movie, to make matters worse, the story becomes absolutely ridiculous at one point. Coupled with all the slow-motion and the loud background score, the only positive about this movie is its short runtime."
