= Manassu =

- Directed by: Hameed Kakkassery
- Written by: Hameed Kakkassery; Jagathy NK Achari (dialogues)
- Screenplay by: Jagathy N. K. Achari
- Produced by: H. H. Abdulla Settu
- Starring: Prem Nazir; Jayabharathi; Adoor Bhasi; Sankaradi; Rajasree
- Cinematography: Ramachandra Babu
- Edited by: T. R. Sreenivasalu
- Music by: M. S. Baburaj
- Production company: Kalalaya Films
- Distributed by: Kalalaya Films
- Release date: 25 October 1973
- Country: India
- Language: Malayalam

Manassu is a 1973 Indian Malayalam film, directed by Hameed Kakkassery and produced by H. H. Abdulla Settu. The film stars Prem Nazir, Jayabharathi, Adoor Bhasi and Sankaradi in the lead roles. The film's musical score was composed by M. S. Baburaj.

== Cast ==
- Prem Nazir
- Jayabharathi
- K. P. Ummer
- Sudheer
- Sujatha
- Vincent
- Adoor Bhasi
- Sankaradi
- T. R. Omana
- Bahadoor
- Bhagyalakshmi
- Rajasree

== Soundtrack ==
The music was composed by M. S. Baburaj and the lyrics were written by P. Bhaskaran.

| No. | Song | Singers | Lyrics | Length (m:ss) |
|---|---|---|---|---|
| 1 | "Adutha Lottery" | Raveendran, K. R. Venu | P. Bhaskaran | |
| 2 | "Ammuvininnoru Sammaanam" | B. Vasantha, Chorus | P. Bhaskaran | |
| 3 | "Ellaamarinjavan Nee Maathram" | S. Janaki | P. Bhaskaran | |
| 4 | "Kalpanaaraamathil" | Cochin Ibrahim, L. R. Anjali | P. Bhaskaran | |
| 5 | "Krishna Dayaamaya" | S. Janaki | P. Bhaskaran | |
