= Gisada =

Swiss fragrance company

Gisada Switzerland
- Company type: Private
- Industry: Fragrance
- Founded: 2013
- Founders: Arben Ademi
- Headquarters: Winterthur, Switzerland
- Area served: Over 92 countries
- Number of employees: 150-200 (2024)
- Website: Gisada

Gisada Switzerland is a Swiss fragrance company specializing in creating, producing, and distributing perfumes. It was founded in 2013 and is owned by Swiss Fragrance GmbH. The company operates in 81 countries through retailers, distributors, and online channels.

== History ==
Gisada Switzerland was founded by Arben Ademi, in Winterthur, Switzerland, in 2013. In 2017, Gisada launched in Marionnaud, Switzerland, making its products available in 84 stores. By 2018, the brand had expanded in Switzerland with Uomo & Donna in 70 stores and increased its presence in Germany to 370 stores by September.

In October 2019, Gisada entered 200 stores in France through Marionnaud and continued its expansion in November by reaching 104 stores in the Netherlands with Douglas. In October 2020, Gisada launched in Marionnaud Austria, adding 88 stores, and introduced the Ambassador Perfume. Additionally, Gisada entered the United Arab Emirates market with Karji Stores, launching in 21 stores.

In 2021, Gisada launched a new men's perfume, Ambassador Intense, created by Andreas Wilhelm. In 2022, Gisada launched another men's perfume, Ambassador Intense, and entered the travel retail sector with Dufry.

In 2023, Gisada introduced the Titanium perfume and restyled its luxury line. Also, the brand expanded its travel retail presence with Lagardère.

Among Gisada's brand ambassadors are Michele Morrone, an Italian actor and model, Anthony Joshua, a British professional boxer, and Jeremy Meeks, an American model.
