= Thira (film) =

- Theatrical release poster
- Directed by: Vineeth Sreenivasan
- Written by: Rakesh Mantodi
- Dialogues by: Rakesh Mantodi; Vineeth Sreenivasan
- Produced by: Manoj Menon
- Starring: Shobana Pillai; Dhyan Sreenivasan; Deepak Parambol
- Cinematography: Jomon T. John
- Edited by: Ranjan Abraham
- Music by: Shaan Rahman
- Production company: Reelsmagic Productions
- Distributed by: LJ Films; Tricolor Entertainments; Europe – Indian Movies UK Ltd.
- Release date: 14 November 2013
- Running time: 113 minutes
- Country: India
- Language: Malayalam

Thira (transl. Wave) is a 2013 Indian Malayalam-language neo-noir action thriller film directed by Vineeth Sreenivasan and written by his cousin Rakesh Mantodi. It stars Shobana alongside debutant Dhyan Sreenivasan in the lead roles. The film was produced by Manoj Menon under the banner ReelsMagic and distributed by LJ Films.

Thira was announced to be the first installment in a trilogy of thriller films. According to Vineeth, the film was inspired by the book The Road of Lost Innocence: The True Story of a Cambodian Heroine by Somaly Mam. The film marks the debut of Vineeth Sreenivasan's younger brother Dhyan Sreenivasan and also the return of Shobana Pillai to Malayalam cinema after almost a gap of five years. It was filmed by Jomon T. John and has music composed by Shaan Rahman. Principal photography of the film took place in Hyderabad, Chennai, Belgaum, and Goa. It was released on 14 November 2013. The film was screened in IFFK 2013. Dinesh Prabhakar was the casting director.

== Plot ==
The story is set in the Indian states of Karnataka and Goa. Dr. Rohini Pranab, a busy cardiac surgeon, also rescues and shelters destitute and trafficked girls in a home she runs. One day, her girls are kidnapped by an illegal human trafficking ring. Rohini is charged with illegal trafficking after the kidnap of the girls and the news hits all major newspapers. A youth named Naveen also loses his sister to the same gang when she is kidnapped, right in front of his eyes. Rohini and Naveen meet due to their similar circumstances and decide to rescue the girls before they are drugged and raped by high-profile clients during a party organised by a mining group. Rohini's friends also try to help, but the gang is well-connected, well-coordinated, and always a step ahead of them.

By opening the bank locker of Pranab Ray, Rohini's husband, an investigative journalist who was killed by this very same gang, they get clues to the whereabouts of the girls, but his hard disk with the information is stolen when Rohini is kidnapped while coming out of the bank. Rohini escapes from the kidnappers' car who drive away with Pranab's file and hard disk. Rohini remembers the photograph in Pranab's file and they figure out the place where the girls are. They then proceed to Goa to rescue the girls.

== Cast ==
- Shobana as Dr. Rohini Pranab
- Dhyan Sreenivasan as Naveen
- Deepak Parambol as Deepak
- S. Rajasekar as Dada
- Sijoy Varghese as Home Minister Alex
- Amritha Anil as Rhea
- Gaurav Vasudev as Kidnapper
- Janan V. Jacob as Bank Manager
- Harikrishnan
- Sabhitha

== Soundtrack ==
Thira

Soundtrack album by Shaan Rahman
- Released: 2013
- Language: Malayalam
- Producer: Manoj Menon

Shaan Rahman chronology
Hotel California (2013)	Thira (2013)

The film's soundtrack is composed by Shaan Rahman, with lyrics penned by Anu Elizabeth Jose.

No.	Title	Artist(s)	Length
1.	"Theerathe Neelunne"	Vineeth Sreenivasan	3:40
2.	"Thazhvaaram"	Hesham & Neha Nair	5:05
3.	"Nithya Sahaya Nadhe"	Neha Nair	5:14
4.	"Thaazhe Nee Tharame"	Sachin Warrier, Job Kurian, Sayanora	2:50
5.	"Thazhvaaram"	Neha Nair	2:52

== Reception ==
Thira was a commercial failure at the box office.

The Times of India gave 3 stars out of 5 and mentioned "The narrative of the film moves at a steady pace despite the predictability that comes along with it". Sify.com described the film as average, "an okay one-time watch", while pointing out inspirations from the 2007 film, Trade. The New Indian Express wrote, "Thira is a satisfying thriller carried successfully by lead actress Shobhana".

== Sequel ==
Thira was announced to be the first of the trilogy thriller series by Vineeth Sreenivasan. Vineeth wrote on his official blog, "Thira is not one film. It's a trilogy. If everything goes well by god's grace, Part 1 will be released in 2013. Part 2 and Part 3 will follow....". Vineeth also revealed that Thira 2 will have a popular young actor of Mollywood in lead role and he will also star in Thira 3, along with Shobana, who played the lead in Thira. The sequel was planned to be more character-oriented, rather than being an extension of Thira. It was confirmed by Vineeth that Thira 2 will be focusing more on the character, Amar and the part of Dhyan is over with the first film. However, Vineeth confirmed that the sequel didn't materialize due to several reasons.

== Festival screenings ==
The film was an official selection for the following film festival:

- Gwinnett Center International Film Festival – International Competition section.

== Awards ==
=== Vanitha Film Awards ===
- Best Actress – Shobana Pillai

=== Asianet Film Awards ===
- Best Debut Actor – Dhyan Sreenivasan
