= Raathriyile Yaathrakkaar =

- Directed by: P. Venu
- Written by: C. P. Antony
- Produced by: Aswathy Suku
- Starring: Jayabharathi; Adoor Bhasi; Sreelatha Namboothiri; Bahadoor
- Music by: G. Devarajan
- Release date: 20 August 1976
- Country: India
- Language: Malayalam

Raathriyile Yaathrakkaar is a 1976 Indian Malayalam film, directed by P. Venu and produced by Aswathy Suku. The film stars Jayabharathi, Adoor Bhasi, Sreelatha Namboothiri and Bahadoor in the lead roles. The film has musical score by G. Devarajan.

== Cast ==
- Jayabharathi
- Adoor Bhasi
- Sreelatha Namboothiri
- Bahadoor
- K. P. Ummer
- Sadhana
- Vincent

== Soundtrack ==
The music was composed by G. Devarajan and the lyrics were written by Sreekumaran Thampi.

No.	Song	Singers	Lyrics	Length (m:ss)
1	"Amminee Ente Ammini"	C. O. Anto	Sreekumaran Thampi	
2	"Ashokavanathil"	P. Madhuri	Sreekumaran Thampi	
3	"Inangiyaalen Thankam"	K. J. Yesudas	Sreekumaran Thampi	
4	"Kaavyabhavana Manjarikal"	P. Jayachandran	Sreekumaran Thampi	
5	"Rohini Nakshathram"	P. Madhuri	Sreekumaran Thampi	
