= Nirapara =

Indian food production company

- Product type: Rice; Spice powder
- Current owner: Wipro Enterprises
- Country: India
- Introduced: 1976
- Website: nirapara.com

Nirapara is a well known food product brand started in the year 1988 in Kottayam district of Kerala by Nirapara Roller flour Mills Pvt. Ltd. which was founded by late P. V. Francis. The brand gained popularity in dealing with wheat products in Kerala. Later Rice products along with spices and pickles under the brand name Nirapara were started by K. K. R. Mills which was established by K.K.R. Karnan. This K. K. R. Mills was acquired by Wipro Consumer Care in 2022.

== History ==
Nirapara Roller Flour Mills Pvt. Ltd. was started in Kottayam, Kerala by late P. V. Francis, who was a well known wheat and rice merchant in Kerala. The company is currently headed by his son P. F. Joseph.

KKR Group was established by K. K. Karnan as a small scale rice mill factory located in the town of Okkal in Kalady, near Kochi. K. K. Karnan later expanded this venture into a modern rice processing mill. Rice varieties, spice powders, ready-to-eat and other food products manufactured by the company were all brought under one name, making Nirapara a food brand in South India. Nirapara products are exported from Kerala and are available in 32 other countries including the US, the UK, Canada, Far East and West Asia.

== Controversy ==
K. K. R. Group faced a controversy in September 2015, when the food safety commissioner banned the manufacture, sale, and distribution of the Nirapara chilli, turmeric, and coriander powder under the provisions of the Food Safety and Standards Act of India, as the authorities found added starch in the spice powders.

In October 2015, the Kerala High Court on Tuesday set aside the ban by the Food Safety Commissioner, as the samples were not found harmful for human consumption. In the absence of any harmful content, the court withdrew the ban imposed on the said spice powders facilitating its manufacture, sale, and distribution.
