= Kalyani Priyadarshan =

Indian actress (born 1993)

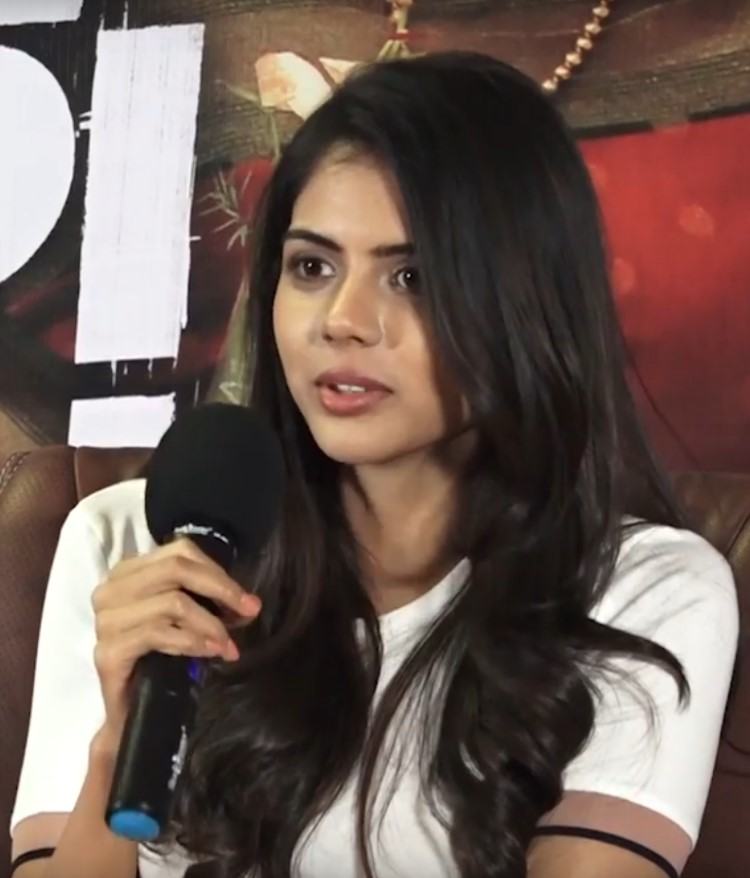
- Born: Kalyani Priyadarshan; 5 April 1993 (age 33); Chennai, Tamil Nadu, India
- Occupation: Actress
- Years active: 2017–present
- Parents: Priyadarshan (father); Lissy (mother)

Kalyani Priyadarshan (born 5 April 1993) is an Indian actress who appears predominantly in Malayalam, Tamil and Telugu films. Kalyani is a recipient of one Filmfare Award South, one Kerala Film Critics Association Award and four SIIMA Awards.

Born to filmmaker Priyadarshan and actress Lissy, Kalyani started her career as an assistant production designer. She made her acting debut in the Telugu film Hello (2017), for which she won the Filmfare Award for Best Female Debut – South. She then expanded to Tamil films with Hero (2019), and Malayalam films with Varane Avashyamund (2020).

Kalyani went into star in commercial successes: Chitralahari (2019), Maanaadu (2021), Hridayam (2022), Bro Daddy (2022) and Thallumaala (2022). She received further recognition with Lokah Chapter 1: Chandra (2025), which became the second highest grossing Malayalam film of all time and one of the highest grossing female-led Indian film.

== Early life ==
Kalyani was born on 5 April 1993 in Chennai, in a Malayali family, to filmmaker Priyadarshan and actress Lissy. She is the elder of two children and has a younger brother, Siddharth.

Kalyani completed her early schooling at the Lady Andal, Chennai, and later studied in Singapore, where she also worked in theatre groups. She then pursued her BArch degree from Parsons School of Design, New York.

== Career ==
=== Debut and early work (2017–2020) ===
Kalyani began her film career in 2013 as an assistant production designer under Sabu Cyril in the Hindi film Krrish 3 (2013). In 2016 she worked as an assistant art director in the Tamil film Iru Mugan (2016). Kalyani made her acting debut with the 2017 Telugu film Hello, opposite Akhil Akkineni. The film received positive response but turned out to be a below-average grosser at the box office. Srivathsan Nadadhur of The Hindu noted, "Kalyani's entry happens a little late into the film but it's a commendable debut complementing and sharing good chemistry with Akhil." Her performance earned her several awards including the Filmfare Award for Best Female Debut – South.

Kalyani had three releases in 2019. She first appeared opposite Sai Dharam Tej in the Telugu film Chitralahari. The film opened to mixed to positive reviews and became a commercial success. Hemanth Kumar of Firstpost stated, "Kalyani does a fine job as an innocent, naive girl; however, her romantic track with Sai Dharam Tej is too superficial." Her other two releases of the year were box office failures, where she appeared opposite Sharwanand in the Telugu film Ranarangam and opposite Sivakarthikeyan in the Tamil film Hero, which also marked her Tamil debut.

In 2020, Kalyani expanded to Malayalam films with Varane Avashyamund opposite Dulquer Salmaan. Cris of The News Minute stated, "Kalyani easily carries off her role as the young woman. Interestingly, she is the more conventional one between the mother and daughter." A commercial success, it was one of the highest grossing Malayalam film of the year and earned her the SIIMA Award for Best Female Debut – Malayalam. In the same year, she played Urvashi's younger version in a segment of the Tamil film Putham Pudhu Kaalai. Saibal Chatterjee stated, "Kalyani capture the present and the past in a seamless flow and is perfectly cast."

=== Commercial success and career progression (2021–2024) ===
In her first film of 2021, Kalyani appeared in the Tamil film Maanaadu opposite Silambarasan, where she played a modern woman. It received positive reviews from critics and was successful at the box office. Haricharan Pudipeddi noted, "Kalyani is good and shines in the limited screen space she gets." Her next release in the same year was the Malayalam film Marakkar: Lion of the Arabian Sea opposite Pranav Mohanlal, where she played a Muslim warrior's wife. The film received mixed to negative reviews and failed at the box office.

The year 2022 marked a turning point in Kalyani's career. All her three Malayalam releases were successful and gained her positive reviews. She first appeared as an engineer in Hridayam opposite Pranav Mohanlal. Sajin Shrijith stated, "Kalyani is aptly cast and Hridayam is her finest hour." A critic from Manorama Online noted, "Kalyani was effective as Nithya and her chemistry with Pranav is one of the high points of the film." A major commercial success, it was one of the highest-grossing film of the year. She next played an IT professional in Bro Daddy opposite Prithviraj Sukumaran. The film was directly released on Disney+ Hotstar. Janani K. opined: "Kalyani as Anna is a revelation. She is a natural and her expressions are apt for every situation." Her performance earned her the SIIMA Award for Best Actress – Malayalam. In her final film of the year, she appeared opposite Tovino Thomas in Thallumaala, playing a vlogger. A box office success, it became one of the highest-grossing films of the year. Nirmal Jovial of The Week noted, "Kalyani's BeEPathu is a strong swag character who claims a huge social media following. Pathu is safe in Kalyani's hands."

Kalyani had two releases in 2023. She first played a Muslim woman who aspires to become a football commentator in Sesham Mike-il Fathima. Athira M noted, "Kalyani has put up an earnest performance with her screen presence. There is an ease with which she plays Fathima but does seem weighed down by the heavy dialogues in some scenes, thus restricting her as an actor." It was a moderate success at the box office. She then played an aggressive college student and a trained boxer alongside Joju George in Antony. A The New Indian Express critic stated, "Kalyani gets some amazing fight scenes in the first half. But, the one-dimensional portrayal of her character doesn't help and it loses connection." The film turned out to be a box office average. In her only release of 2024, Kalyani reunited with Pranav Mohanlal for the Malayalam film Varshangalkku Shesham, where she played a college student and his ex-lover. Latha Srinivasan stated that Kalyani hardly had anything to do. The film was a commercial success and emerged as one of the highest grossing Malayalam films of all time.

=== Recognition with Lokah and further work (2025-present) ===
Kalyani started 2025 with Lokah Chapter 1: Chandra, opposite Naslen, where she played as Chandra, who is secretly Kalliyankattu Neeli, a yakshi. Lokah marked as the first Indian female superhero film. The film became second highest grossing Malayalam film of all time and one of the highest grossing Indian films featuring a female lead, grossing over ₹300 crore. Hariprasad Sadanandan from The Week noted, "Kalyani is terrific as Chandra, both in terms of her body language and in the action set-pieces. Her performance act as the film's backbone." Lokah won her the Kerala Film Critics Association Award for Best Actress and her second SIIMA Best Actress – Malayalam. Kalyani then played a girl whose weird demand leave her lover jilted at their wedding in Odum Kuthira Chaadum Kuthira opposite Fahadh Faasil. The film received negative reviews, with Anandu Suresh of The Indian Express considered her performance as "struggling in a character that clearly demanded far more than what exists in her artistic tapestry". It became a box office failure, but later gained success following its release over Netflix.

Kalyani will next appear in the Tamil film Genie opposite Ravi Mohan, Marshal opposite Karthi and will mark her Hindi film debut with Pralay.

== In the media ==
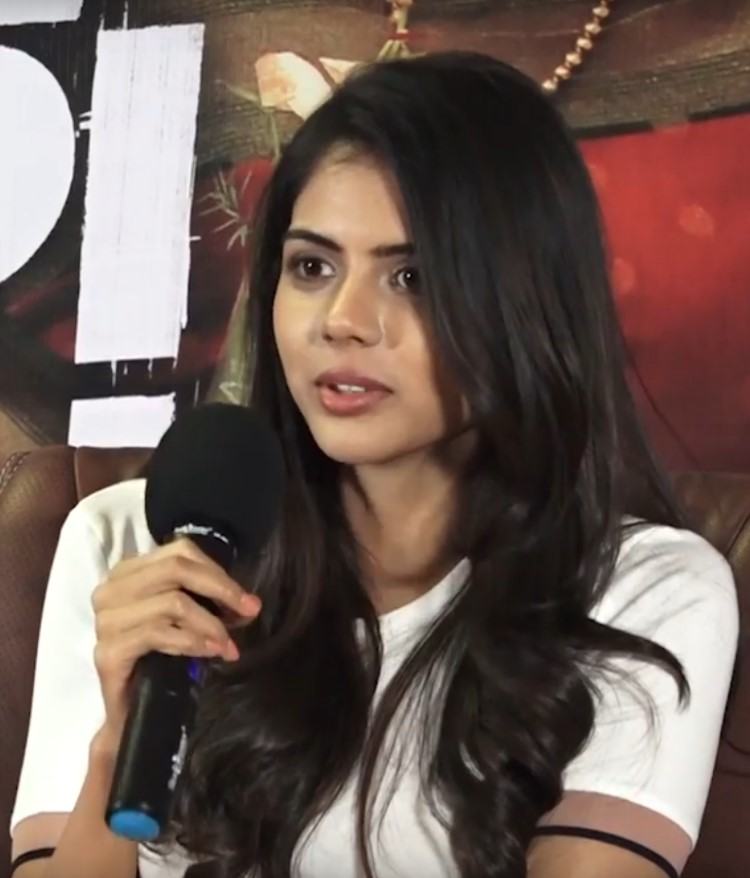
Kalyani in 2017

Kalyani is considered one of the highest paid Malayalam actresses. She received critical acclaim for her debut film Hello, which she has called "the best film" that has happened to her career. 123telugu placed her in its "Top Actresses" list of 2017, for Hello. On her film career, Subhash K. Jha from Rediff.com opined: "Kalyani has become a name to reckon with in Malayalam cinema. Pretty and immensely gifted, she has proved herself to be much more than her prolific father Priyadarshan's daughter."

Kalyani is a prominent celebrity endorser for several brands such as Kalyan Jewellers and Ajio. She has been the cover model for various magazines including "Ritz" and "You & I". In 2020, Kalyani was named Kochi Times Most Desirable Women. The same year, she ranked 8th in Chennai Times Most Desirable Women and 41st in Times Most Desirable Women list.

== Filmography ==
Key
†	Denotes films that have not yet been released

Year	Title	Role	Language(s)	Notes	Ref.
2017	Hello	Priya/Junnu	Telugu		
2019	Chitralahari	Lahari	Telugu		
2019	Ranarangam	Geetha	Telugu		
2019	Hero	Meera	Tamil		
2020	Varane Avashyamund	Nikhitha "Nikki"	Malayalam		
2020	Putham Pudhu Kaalai	Young Lakshmi Krishnan	Tamil	Segment: "Ilamai Idho Idho"	
2021	Maanaadu	Seethalakshmi	Tamil		
2021	Marakkar: Lion of the Arabian Sea	Aisha	Malayalam		
2022	Hridayam	Nithya Balagopal	Malayalam		
2022	Bro Daddy	Anna Kurian	Malayalam		
2022	Thallumaala	Fathima Beevi "Beepathu"	Malayalam		
2023	Sesham Mike-il Fathima	Fathima Noorjahan "Pathu"	Malayalam		
2023	Antony	Ann Maria	Malayalam		
2024	Varshangalkku Shesham	Annie John	Malayalam		
2025	Lokah Chapter 1: Chandra	Chandra / Kalliyankattu Neeli	Malayalam		
2025	Odum Kuthira Chaadum Kuthira	Nidhi Sudhish	Malayalam		
TBA	Genie †	TBA	Tamil	Filming	
TBA	Marshal †	TBA	Tamil	Filming	
TBA	Pralay †	TBA	Hindi	Filming	

== Awards and nominations ==
=== Film Awards ===
Year	Award	Category	Film	Result	Ref.
2018	Filmfare Awards South	Best Female Debut – South	Hello	Won	
2018	South Indian International Movie Awards	Best Female Debut – Telugu	Hello	Won	
2018	Zee Telugu Apsara Awards	Debut Heroine of the Year	Hello	Won	
2022	South Indian International Movie Awards	Best Female Debut – Malayalam	Varane Avashyamund	Won	
2023	South Indian International Movie Awards	Best Actress – Malayalam	Bro Daddy	Won	
2024	Filmfare Awards South	Best Actress – Malayalam	Sesham Mike-il Fathima	Nominated	
2024	South Indian International Movie Awards	Best Actress – Malayalam	Sesham Mike-il Fathima	Nominated	
2024	IIFA Utsavam	Best Actress – Malayalam	Sesham Mike-il Fathima	Nominated	
2026	Kerala Film Critics Association Awards	Best Actress	Lokah Chapter 1: Chandra	Won	
2026	Indian National Cine Academy Awards	Best Actress – Malayalam	Lokah Chapter 1: Chandra	Won	
2026	Indian Film Festival of Melbourne	Best Performance – Female	Lokah Chapter 1: Chandra	Nominated	
2026	South Indian International Movie Awards	Best Actress – Malayalam	Lokah Chapter 1: Chandra	Won	

=== Other Awards ===
Year	Award	Category	Result	Ref.
2026	Elle List	Rising Star, Female	Won	
2026	Kerala Youth Icon Awards	Art and Culture	Won	
2026	Vogue Values: Women of Excellence	—N/a	Won	
2026	The Hollywood Reporter India's Women in Entertainment Power List	—N/a	Won	
2026	GQ's Most Influential Young Indians	—N/a	Won	
