= Uday Ramachandran =

Indian musician

- Born: V.R.Udayakumar; Vaikom, Kerala, India
- Genres: Indian classical, Playback Singing
- Occupation: Singer
- Years active: 2004 – present
- Website: www.udaysinger.com

Uday Ramachandran is an Indian playback singer, composer, carnatic musician and a voice trainer. He has recorded songs for a number of Malayalam movies and albums. Ramachandran has recorded more than 500 songs in Malayalam. He has performed at more than a hundred-stage shows in India and abroad.

Ramachandran's music company Charu Creations launched in 2014 and created various albums.

== Early life ==
Ramachandran was born into a family of musicians with eight other 'Ganabhooshanam' holders at Vaikom to Mr.V.N.Ramachandran and Mrs. V.N. Thankamani. His father's elder brother, Sri Vaikom V.N. Rajan was his first music guru beginning in 1985. He started his academic music training at R.L.V. Music Academy, Thrippunithura. He was trained in Carnatic Music by Sri N.P.Ramaswami, and Hindustani Music by Ustad Faiyaz Khan and Mohan Kumar (disciple of Pandit Ramesh Narayan).

Ramachandran's talent and dedication won him prizes during his school and college days. He won the light music competition at All India Universities Youth Festival 1999. He won the MG University Youth festival with A Grade in light music competition consecutively in 1998, 1999 and 2000.

== Career ==
He was a finalist in the reality show Gandharvasangeetham in Kairali TV. Ramachandran was an Announcer and ‘B High’ Grade Artist for All India Radio. He later worked as an administrator and a manager in the health care industry. He associated with Asha Hospital, Vatakara, Kozhikode (2008 Nov – 2010 Dec) as Manager Administration and in Lakshmi Hospital, Ernakulum (1998 TO 2007) as Manager of Administration.

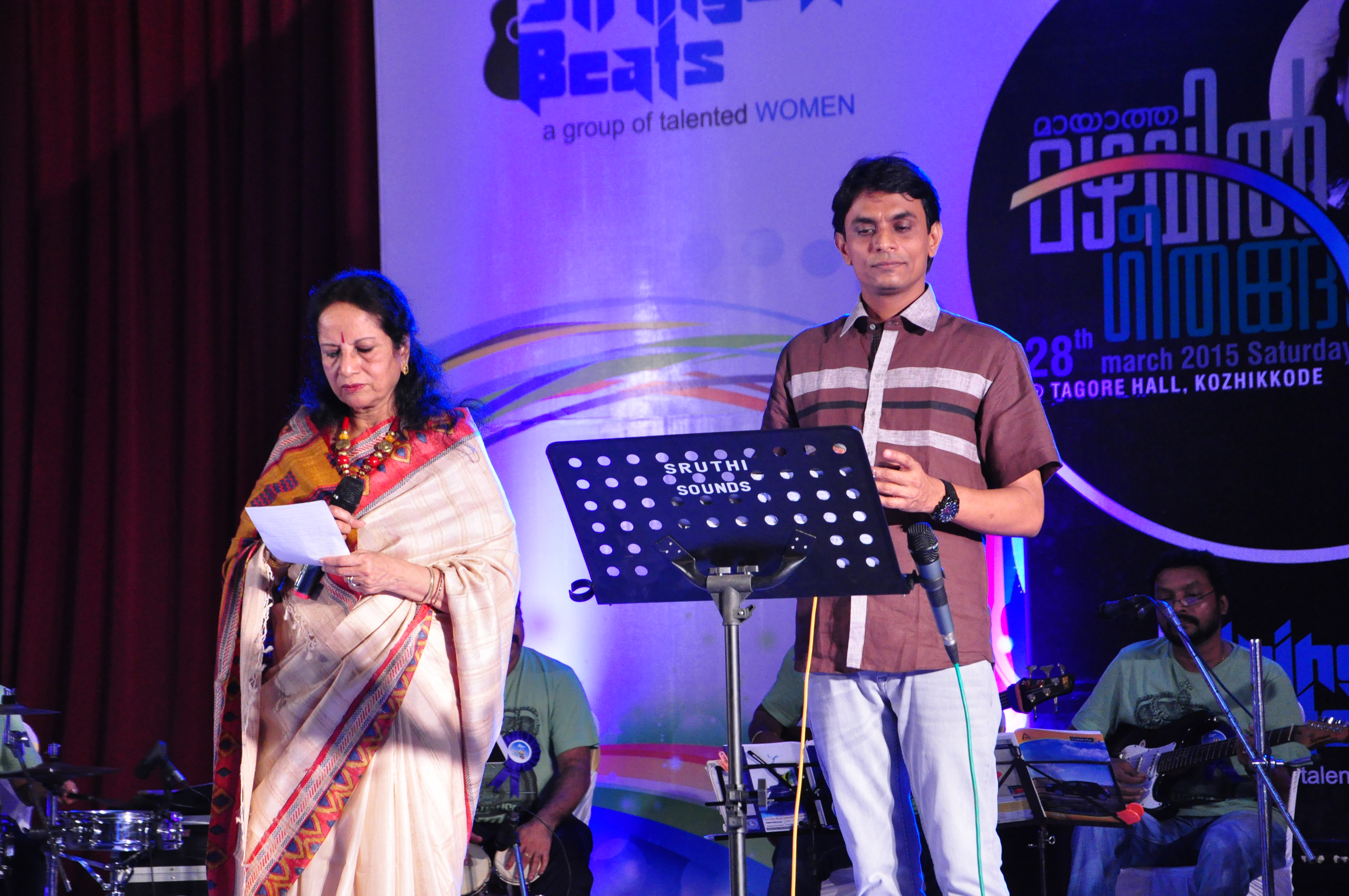
Ramachandran Performing with Smt. Vani Jayaram at Kozhikode

Ramachandran has worked on audio albums and film songs. He rendered songs for various remakes and has released more than 500 audio cassettes and CDs. He collaborated with legends, including G. Devarajan Master, Perumbavoor G. Raveendranath, Raveendran Mash, Rajamani, Vidhaydharan Mash, Jayavijaya (Jayan), Mankombu Gopalakrishnan, Darshan Raman, T.S.Radhakrishnaji, Bijibal, Santhosh Varma, Karthik Prakash, and Neeraj Gopal. His entry to playback singing was marked by a song in the movie Doctor Innocent Aanu and rendered a beautiful melody, "Ormakalkkoppam", in the movie Namboothiri Yuvavu @ 43. Recently Ramachandran voiced an M Mohanan Movie My God under Bijibal's music composition.

=== Kuwait (2010 to 2012) ===
Ramachandran was instrumental in setting up the first Malayalam radio station in Kuwait – 98.4 Ufm. He was the administration head and the music manager. Ramachandran's Live show Heart-Throbs attracted thousands of listeners.

== Discography ==
Year	Film	Song	Lyrics	Music
2019	Kozhipporu	Vaayadikkattu		Bijibal
2018	Pretham 2	Brahmadaya	Traditional	Anand Madhusoodanan
2018	Contessa	Kannetha Doore (With Mithun Jayaraj)	Rijosh	Rijosh
2018	Samaksham	Poonilavil	Adv.Sudhamsu	Aby Salvin Thomas
2018	Premasoothram	Ninnullil Premam	Jiju Ashokan	Gopi Sundar
2017	Paipin Chottile Pranayam	Kaathu Kathittu	B K Harinarayan	Bijibal
2017	Cappuccino	Enine Padendu Njan (with Ann Amie)	Venu V Desham	Hesham Abdul Vahab
2017	Kaaliyan	Mazhayayum Veyilayum	Ajith Irapuram	Jithesh & Vinod
2016	10 Kalpanakal	Rithu Shalabhame (with Shreya Ghoshal)	Roy Puramadam	Mithun Eshwar
2016	Oru Malayalam Colour Padam	Mele Doore Vanil (with Nithya Balagopal	Anil Punnad	Mithun Eshwar
2015	My God	Kusuruthi Kuppayakkara	Ramesh Kavil	Bijibal
2015	Oru New Generation Pani	Mizhikalil Eenam	George Mathew	Karthik Prakash
2013	Namboothiri Yuvavu @ 43	Ormmakalkkoppam	Ajith Irapuram	Neeraj Gopal
2012	Doctor Innocent Aanu	Sneham Pookkum	Santhosh Varma	Santhosh Varma
2010	Police Story	Ninnude Ullil (with Sangeetha Varma)	Mankombu Gopalakrishanan	M.M.Sreelekha
2010	Operation Duryodhana	Eak Bar Dekho (with Jyotsana Radhakrishnan)	Mankombu Gopalakrishanan	M.M.Sreelekha
2009	Raja Mudra	Ragam Thedum	Mankombu Gopalakrishanan	S.A.Rajkumar

== Latest Selected Albums 2018 ==
Album	Category	Lyrics	Music
Shanmukha Priyam	Hindu Devotional	P.C.Aravindan	T.S.Radhakrishnaji
Sree Shailam	Hindu Devotional	P.R.Prasad	Ranjth Gandharv
Pushparchana	Hindu Devotional	S.Ramesan Nair	T.S.Radhakrishnaji
Pranayamay	Love Songs	Vivek Babu	Vivek Babu
Aakashapanthal	Drama	Mathews Koonammavu	Ullala Somanath
Ponnolam Ponnea	Nostalgic Songs	S.Ramesan Nair	Manu Ramesan
Thuruthi Theertham	Hindu Devotional	Joby Jacob	C.Sasikumar
Moulada Veela	Muslim Devotional	O.M.Karuvarakundu	Jyothish Krishna
Prathyaksha Devan	Hindu Devotional	Santhosh Varma	Santhosh Varma
Vachanolsavam	Christian Devotional	V.A Paul	Shaji Thykkadan
