= List of Malayalam films of 2017 =

The tables list the Malayalam films released in theaters in the year 2017. Premiere shows and film festival screenings are not considered as releases for this list.

== Released films ==
Opening		Title	Director	Cast	Production house	Ref
J A N U A R Y	6	Kaadu Pookkunna Neram	Dr. Biju	Indrajith Sukumaran, Rima Kallingal		
J A N U A R Y	6	Kaviyude Osyath	Vineeth Anil	Prakash Bare, Kochu Preman		
J A N U A R Y	7	God Say	Sherrey	Vinay Forrt, Mythili, Joy Mathew, Indrans		
J A N U A R Y	19	Jomonte Suvisheshangal	Sathyan Anthikkad	Dulquer Salmaan, Mukesh, Anupama Parameswaran, Aishwarya Rajesh		
J A N U A R Y	20	Munthirivallikal Thalirkkumbol	Jibu Jacob	Mohanlal, Meena, Anoop Menon		
F E B R U A R Y	3	Valappottukal	Madhu Thattamppally	Madhu, Boban Alummoodan, Sudheer Karamana		
F E B R U A R Y	3	Fukri	Siddique	Jayasurya, Anu Sithara, Prayaga Martin, Lal, Siddique		
F E B R U A R Y	10	Ezra	Jay. K	Prithviraj Sukumaran, Priya Anand, Tovino Thomas, Vijayaraghavan		
F E B R U A R Y	17	Swayam	R. Sarath	Lakshmi Priyaa Chandramouli, Nimay Pillai		
F E B R U A R Y	17	Aaradi	Saji Palamel	Hima Shankar, Irshad, Shivaji Guruvayoor		
F E B R U A R Y	23	Aby	Srikant Murali	Vineeth Sreenivasan, Mareena Michael, Aju Varghese, Suraj Venjaramoodu		
F E B R U A R Y	24	Veeram	Jayaraj	Kunal Kapoor, Shivajith Nambiar, Divina Thackur, Himarsha Venkatsamy, Satheesh Menon		
M A R C H	3	Angamaly Diaries	Lijo Jose Pellissery	Antony Varghese, Anna Rajan		
M A R C H	3	Oru Mexican Aparatha	Tom Emmatty	Tovino Thomas, Neeraj Madhav, Gayathri Suresh, Roopesh Peethambaran		
M A R C H	10	Ayal Jeevichirippundu	Vyasan K. P.	Manikandan R. Achary, Vijay Babu		
M A R C H	10	Devayaanam	Sukesh Roy	Kailash, Malavika Menon, KPAC Lalitha, Suraj Venjaramoodu, Neena Kurup		
M A R C H	10	Samarpanam	K. Gopinathan	Anil Nedumangad, Santhosh Keezhattoor, Virginia Rodriguez, Indrans		
M A R C H	17	Alamara	Midhun Manuel Thomas	Sunny Wayne, Ranji Panicker, Aditi Ravi, Aju Varghese		
M A R C H	17	C/O Saira Banu	Antony Sony Sebastian	Manju Warrier, Amala Akkineni, Shane Nigam		
M A R C H	17	Nee Mathram Sakshi	K M R	Kalasala Babu, K M R, Rekha Warrier		
M A R C H	17	Kuppivala	Suresh Pillai	M. R. Gopakumar, Neena Kurup, T S Raju, Anant Jayachandran, Sruthi Suresh		
M A R C H	17	Pareeth Pandari	Gafoor Ellias	Kalabhavan Shajon, Sajitha Madathil, Ansiba Hassan		
M A R C H	17	Dry	Vishak Punna	Roshan Mathews, Nawas M H		
M A R C H	17	Aakashathinum Bhoomikkumidayil	Sandeep Ajith Kumar	Neena Kurup, Master Mohsin Salaam		
M A R C H	17	Oru Malayalam Color Padam	Ajith Nambiar	Anjali Upasana, Manu Bhadran		
M A R C H	24	Honey Bee 2	Lal Jr.	Asif Ali, Bhavana, Baburaj, Sreenath Bhasi, Balu Varghese, Sreenivasan, Mamitha Baiju		
M A R C H	24	Take Off	Mahesh Narayan	Fahadh Faasil, Kunchacko Boban, Parvathy, Asif Ali, Prakash Belawadi		
M A R C H	30	The Great Father	Haneef Adeni	Mammootty, Arya, Sneha, Shaam, Malavika Mohanan, Anikha		
M A R C H	31	Georgettan's Pooram	K. Biju	Dileep, Rajisha Vijayan, Chemban Vinod Jose, Vinay Forrt, Sharaf U Dheen, Renji Panicker		
M A R C H	31	Kambhoji	Vinod Mankara	Vineeth, Lakshmi Gopalaswamy, Sona Nair, Rachana Narayanankutty		
A P R I L	7	1971: Beyond Borders	Major Ravi	Mohanlal, Allu Sirish, Srushti Dange, Arunoday Singh, Asha Sarath, Renji Panicker, Sudheer Karamana		
A P R I L	12	Puthan Panam	Ranjith	Mammootty, Iniya, Mammukoya, Renji Panicker, Sheelu Abraham		
A P R I L	14	Sakhavu	Sidhartha Siva	Nivin Pauly, Aishwarya Rajesh, Sreenivasan, Aparna Gopinath, Gayathri Suresh		
A P R I L	20	Sathya	Diphan	Jayaram, Parvathy Nambiar, Roma Asrani, Sudheer Karamana		
A P R I L	21	Gemini	P. K. Baburaj	Renji Panicker, Esther Anil, Sijoy Varghese, Leona Lishoy, Sunil Sukhada		
A P R I L	21	Rakshadhikari Baiju Oppu	Ranjan Pramod	Biju Menon, Hannah Reji Koshy, Aju Varghese, Deepak Parambol, Hareesh Perumanna, Vijayaraghavan, Janardhanan, Indrans		
M A Y	5	CIA – Comrade in America	Amal Neerad	Dulquer Salmaan, Chandini Sreedharan, Soubin Shahir, Dileesh Pothan		
M A Y	6	Lakshyam	Anzar Khan	Biju Menon, Sshivada, Indrajith Sukumaran		
M A Y	12	Ramante Edanthottam	Ranjith Shankar	Kunchacko Boban, Anu Sithara		
M A Y	12	Vedham	Prasad Yadav	Siddique, Rekha, Jagadish, Thalaivasal Vijay, Sai Kumar, Kaviyoor Ponnamma		
M A Y	19	Achayans	Kannan Thamarakkulam	Jayaram, Unni Mukundan, Amala Paul, Prakash Raj, Adil Ibrahim, Sshivada, Anu Sithara, Anju Aravind		
M A Y	19	Adventures of Omanakuttan	Rohith V. S.	Asif Ali, Bhavana, Srinda Arhaan, Siddique		
M A Y	19	Godha	Basil Joseph	Tovino Thomas, Wamiqa Gabbi, Renji Panicker, Aju Varghese		
M A Y	26	Careful	V. K. Prakash	Vijay Babu, Sandhya Raju, Jomol, Saiju Kurup, Aju Varghese		
M A Y	26	The Crab	Bharathan Njarakal	Deva Surya, Justin Chacko, Kumarakom Reghunath		
J U N E	9	Chicken Kokkachi	Anuranjan Premji	Sudhi Koppa, Dharmajan Bolgatty, Neha Ratnakaran, Bijukuttan		
J U N E	9	Gold Coins	Pramod G. Gopal	Sunny Wayne, Meera Nandan, Tessa Joseph, Master Vasudev, Master Gopal		
J U N E	9	Ma Chu Ka	Jayan Vannery	Pasupathy, Janani Iyer		
J U N E	16	Dance Dance	Nisar	Ramzan Muhammed, Hareesh Peradi, Suraj Venjaramoodu, Devi Ajith		
J U N E	16	Ente Kallu Pencil	Jespal Shanmughan	Narayanan Kutty, Saju Navodaya, Kalabhavan Rahman, A. S. Rajendra		
J U N E	16	Pathinonnam Sthalam	S Sharath	Jithin Raj, P T Manoj		
J U N E	16	Vilakkumaram	Vijay Menon	Bhavana, Neena Kurup, Manoj K. Jayan, Suraj Venjaramoodu, Vinod Kovoor		
J U N E	16	Avarude Raavukal	Shanil Muhammed	Asif Ali, Unni Mukundan, Honey Rose, Vinay Forrt, Aju Varghese		
J U N E	24	Oru Cinemakkaran	Leo Thaddhevoos	Vineeth Sreenivasan, Rajisha Vijayan, Anusree, Renji Panicker, Vijay Babu		
J U N E	24	Viswasapoorvam Mansoor	P. T. Kunju Muhammed	Roshan Mathew, Prayaga Martin, Zarina Wahab, Leona Lishoy		
J U N E	25	Role Models	Rafi	Fahadh Faasil, Namitha Pramod, Vinay Forrt, Srinda Arhaan, Vinayakan, Sharaf U Dheen, Rithu Manthra		
J U N E	30	Pretham Undu Sookshikkuka	Mohammed Ali	Shine Tom Chacko, Hareesh Perumanna, Kalhara, Leena Maria Paul		
J U N E	30	Thondimuthalum Driksakshiyum	Dileesh Pothan	Fahadh Faasil, Alancier, Nimisha Sajayan, Soubin Shahir		
J U L Y	7	Ayal Sasi	Sajin Babu	Sreenivasan, Kochu Preman, Anil Nedumangad, S. P. Sreekumar, Divya Gopinath		
J U L Y	7	Tiyaan	Jiyen Krishnakumar	Prithviraj Sukumaran, Indrajith Sukumaran, Padmapriya Janakiraman, Ananya, Murali Gopy		
J U L Y	14	Hadiyya	Unni Pranavam	Nishan, Ragini Nandwani, Leona Lishoy, Alencier Ley Lopez, Anjali Aneesh		
J U L Y	14	Sunday Holiday	Jis Joy	Asif Ali, Aparna Balamurali, Alencier Ley Lopez, Sreenivasan, Siddique		
J U L Y	14	Chodyam	Biju Sukumar	Shruthi Vishwanath, Santhosh Mevada, Sudarsh Krishna		
J U L Y	14	Indulekha	Muhammedkutty	Ansiba Hassan, M. R. Gopakumar		
J U L Y	21	Basheerinte Premalekhanam	Aneesh Anwar	Farhaan Faasil, Sana Althaf, Sheela, Asha Aravind, Aju Varghese		
J U L Y	21	Minnaminungu	Anil Thomas	Prem Prakash, Surabhi Lakshmi, Rabecca Santhosh		
J U L Y	21	Mythily Veendum Varunnu	Sabu Varghese	Shivani bhai, Uday, I. M. Vijayan, Kiran Raj		
J U L Y	21	Team 5	Suresh Govind	S. Sreesanth, Nikki Galrani, Pearle Maaney, Makarand Deshpande		
J U L Y	21	Theeram	Shaheed Arafath	Pranav Ratheesh, Maria John, Tini Tom, Sudhi Koppa		
J U L Y	28	Himalayathile Kashmalan	Abhiram Suresh Unnithan	Jins Bhaskar, Anoop Ramesh, Anand Manmadhan, Dheeraj Denny, Hima Shankar		
J U L Y	28	Kadamkadha	Senthil Rajan	Joju George, Vinay Forrt, Renji Panicker, Srinda Arhaan, Roshan Mathew, Veena Nandakumar		
J U L Y	28	Pakal Pole	Kollam Ajith	Kollam Ajith, Bindu Ramakrishnan, Kochu Preman, Riyaz Khan		
J U L Y	28	Utharam Parayathe	Kollam Rajesh	Hari Gopinath, Priya Mohan, Sudheer Karamana, Sajan Palluruthy		
A U G U S T	4	Chunkzz	Omar Lulu	Balu Varghese, Honey Rose, Vishak Nair, Ganapathi, Mareena Michael, Dharmajan Bolgatty		
A U G U S T	4	Dravida Puthri	Roy Thaikkadan	Liya Maju, Akhil Das		
A U G U S T	4	Sarvopari Palakkaran	Venugopan	Anoop Menon, Aparna Balamurali, Anu Sithara, Balu Varghese, Mamitha Baiju		
A U G U S T	4	Varnyathil Aashanka	Siddharth Bharathan	Kunchacko Boban, Rachana Narayanankutty, Suraj Venjaramoodu, Chemban Vinod Jose, Shine Tom Chacko		
A U G U S T	11	Clint	Harikumar	Unni Mukundan, Rima Kallingal, Master Alok, Renji Panicker, KPAC Lalitha		
A U G U S T	11	Thrissivaperoor Kliptham	Rathiesh Kumar	Asif Ali, Aparna Balamurali, Chemban Vinod Jose, Shilpi Sharma, Vineeth Mohan		
A U G U S T	18	Bobby	Shebi Chowgat	Niranj, Miya, Aju Varghese, Dharmajan Bolgatty		
A U G U S T	18	E	Kuku Surendran	Gautami, Ashiq Ameer, Nithya Naresh, Balaji Jayaraman, Meera Nair, Hari Kumar K		
A U G U S T	18	Honey Bee 2.5	Shyju Anthikkad	Askar Ali, Asif Ali, Lijomol Jose, Lal, Bhavana, Mamitha Baiju		
A U G U S T	18	Karutha Joothan	Salim Kumar	Salim Kumar, Ramesh Pisharody, Sohan Seenulal, Shivaji Guruvayoor		
A U G U S T	18	Mannamkattayum Kariyilayum	Arun Sagara	Shine Tom Chacko, Srinda Arhaan, Saiju Kurup		
A U G U S T	18	Naval Enna Jewel	Renji Lal Damodaran	Adil Hussain, Shweta Menon, Reem Kadem, Anu Sithara		
A U G U S T	24	Oru Visheshapetta Biriyani Kissa	Kiran Narayanan	Lena, Nedumudi Venu, Joju George, Sunil Sukhada, Mammukoya, Bhavana		
A U G U S T	25	Lechmi	B. N. Shajeer Shah	Parvathy Rajeesh, Biju Sopanam, Maanav, Kalabhavan Rahman, Sethulakshmi		
A U G U S T	25	Thank You Very Much	Sajin Lal	Lena, Dinesh Panicker, Babu Namboothiri, Kalasala Babu, Bijukuttan		
A U G U S T	31	Velipadinte Pusthakam	Lal Jose	Mohanlal, Appani Sarath, Arun Kurian, Priyanka Nair, Anoop Menon, Alencier Ley Lopez, Kalabhavan Shajon		
S E P T E M B E R	1	Adam Joan	Jinu Abraham	Prithviraj Sukumaran, Bhavana, Mishti, Maniyanpilla Raju, Rahul Madhav, Narain Kumar, Siddique		
S E P T E M B E R	1	Njandukalude Nattil Oridavela	Althaf Salim	Nivin Pauly, Ahaana Krishna, Aishwarya Lekshmi, Saiju Kurup, Lal, Dileesh Pothan		
S E P T E M B E R	1	Pullikkaran Staraa	Shyam Dhar	Mammootty, Asha Sarath, Deepti Sati, Dileesh Pothan, Innocent		
S E P T E M B E R	15	Cappuccino	Naushad	Aneesh G. Menon, Anwar Shereef, Dharmajan Bolgatty, Natassha, Sudhi Koppa, Manoj Guinness		
S E P T E M B E R	15	Matchbox	Sivaram Mony	Roshan Mathew, Vishak Nair, Drishya Raghunath		
S E P T E M B E R	15	Seethakali	Sreeprathap	Shivaji Guruvayoor, Anu Joseph, Sneha Divakaran, Sona Nair		
S E P T E M B E R	15	Kaaliyan	Jijo Pangode	Tini Tom, Balachandran Chullikkad, Meghanathan		
S E P T E M B E R	21	Parava	Soubin Shahir	Dulquer Salmaan, Shane Nigam, Arjun Ashokan, Soubin Shahir, Sreenath Bhasi, Shine Tom Chacko		
S E P T E M B E R	22	Pokkiri Simon	Jiju Anthony	Sunny Wayne, Prayaga Martin, Jacob Gregory, Anjali Aneesh		
S E P T E M B E R	28	Ramaleela	Arun Gopy	Dileep, Prayaga Martin, Radhika, Mukesh, Siddique, Renji Panicker		
S E P T E M B E R	28	Udaharanam Sujatha	Phantom Praveen	Manju Warrier, Anaswara Rajan, Mamta Mohandas, Joju George, Nedumudi Venu		
S E P T E M B E R	29	Sherlock Toms	Shafi	Biju Menon, Miya, Srinda Arhaan, Salim Kumar, Vijayaraghavan		
S E P T E M B E R	29	Tharangam	Dominic Arun	Tovino Thomas, Santhy Balachandran, Balu Varghese, Neha Iyer, Vijayaraghavan		
O C T O B E R	5	Solo	Bejoy Nambiar	Dulquer Salmaan, Neha Sharma, Sai Dhanshika, Deepti Sati, Sruthi Hariharan, Dino Morea, Ann Augustine, Manoj K. Jayan, Suhasini Maniratnam, Nassar		
O C T O B E R	12	Lavakusha	Gireesh Mano	Neeraj Madhav, Aju Varghese, Biju Menon, Deepti Sati, Aditi Ravi		
O C T O B E R	13	Crossroad	Lenin Rajendran, Madhupal, Sashi Paravoor, Albert, Avira Rebecca, Pradeep Nair, Nemom Pushparaj, Ashok R. Nath, Babu Thiruvalla, Nayana Suryan	Mamta Mohandas, Padmapriya Janakiraman, Isha Talwar, Srinda Arhaan, Mythili, Richa Panai, Priyanka Nair		
O C T O B E R	13	Kaattu	Arun Kumar Aravind	Asif Ali, Varalaxmi Sarathkumar, Manasa Radhakrishnan, Shebin Benson, Murali Gopy		
O C T O B E R	13	Red Run	Ram Babu	Rojo, Dileep, Parvathi, Sreejith Ravi, Babu Antony, Manka Mahesh, Shivaji Guruvayoor, Preman Palazhi		
O C T O B E R	20	Melle	Binu Ulahannan	Amith Chakkalakkal, Joju George, Thanuja Karthik, Joy Mathew		
O C T O B E R	21	Aakashamittayee	M. Padmakumar/Samuthirakani	Jayaram, Iniya, Kalabhavan Shajon, Sarayu		
O C T O B E R	27	Villain	B. Unnikrishnan	Mohanlal, Vishal Krishna Reddy, Manju Warrier, Hansika Motwani, Raashi Khanna, Meka Srikanth		
O C T O B E R	27	Vishwa Vikhyatharaya Payyanmar	Rajesh Kannankara	Deepak Parambol, Aju Varghese, Manoj K. Jayan, Hareesh Perumanna		
O C T O B E R	27	Onpathaam Valavinappuram	V M Anil	Joy Mathew, Mamukkoya, Shivaji Guruvayoor, Hareesh Peradi		
N O V E M B E R	3	Goodalochana	Thomas Sebastian	Dhyan Sreenivasan, Aju Varghese, Mamta Mohandas, Sreenath Bhasi		
N O V E M B E R	3	Overtake	John Joseph	Vijay Babu, Parvatii Nair, Anjali Nair, Nelson Sooranad		
N O V E M B E R	3	Zacharia Pothen Jeevichirippundu	Ullas Unnikrishnan	Manoj K. Jayan, Lal, Poonam Bajwa, Babu Antony, Rahul Madhav		
N O V E M B E R	10	Chippy	Pradeep Chokli	Surabhi Lakshmi, Shruthy Menon, Joy Mathew, Salim Kumar, Srinda Ashab		
N O V E M B E R	10	Gandhinagarile Unniyarcha	Jayesh Mainagappally	Rajini Chandy, Parvathy Nambiar, Renji Panicker, Innocent		
N O V E M B E R	10	Hello Dubaikkaran	Harisree Yousuf	Adil Ibrahim, Malavika Menon, Salim Kumar, Devan		
N O V E M B E R	17	Chakkaramaavin Kombathu	Tony Chittettukalam	Meera Vasudevan, Indrans, Joy Mathew, Harisree Asokan, Anjali Nair		
N O V E M B E R	17	Paathi	Chandran Narikkode	Indrans, Joy Mathew, Kalabhavan Shajon, Sasi Kalinga		
N O V E M B E R	17	Passu	M. D. Sukumaran	Nandu, Kalasala Babu		
N O V E M B E R	17	Punyalan Private Limited	Ranjith Sankar	Jayasurya, Sreejith Ravi, Aju Varghese, Vijayaraghavan		
N O V E M B E R	17	Y	Sunil Ibrahim	Alencier Ley Lopez, Dheeraj Denny, Abhiram Suresh Unnithan, Jins Bhaskar, Shini Ambalathodi		
N O V E M B E R	17	My School	Pappan Payattuvila	Devayani, Hareesh Peradi, Sona Nair		
N O V E M B E R	24	6 Viralukal	Nisar	Biju Varghese, Deepthi Menon		
N O V E M B E R	24	Chemparathipoo	Arun Vaiga	Askar Ali, Aju Varghese, Aditi Ravi, Parvathy Arun, Sudheer Karamana		
N O V E M B E R	24	Stethoscope	Suresh Iringalloor	Risabava, Lakshmi Sharma, Sajeesh S Nair		
N O V E M B E R	24	History of Joy	Vishnu Govindan	Vinay Forrt, Joju George, Leona Lishoy, Sai Kumar		
N O V E M B E R	24	Paippin Chuvattile Pranayam	Domin D'Silva	Neeraj Madhav, Reba Monica John, Aju Varghese, Indrans		
D E C E M B E R	1	Duryodhana	Pradosh Mohan	Vinu Raghav, Shibu G. Nair, Pradosh Mohan, Shilpa Sunil, Sree Lekshmi, Hima Shankar		
D E C E M B E R	1	Sadrishavakyam 24:29	Prashanth Mambully	Manoj K Jayan, Sheelu Abraham, Vijay Babu, Siddique		
D E C E M B E R	1	Eliyammachiyude Adyathe Christmas	Benny Ashamsa	K. P. A. C. Lalitha, Dr. Divya S Iyer, Madhu		
D E C E M B E R	1	Kuntham	Niyas Yemmech	Vipin Mohan, Sherin Malaika		
D E C E M B E R	8	Karutha Sooryan	EVM Ali	Neena Kurup, Manjusha, Muhammed Shah		
D E C E M B E R	8	Nilavariyathe	Uthpal V. Nayanar	Bala, Shivani bhai, Anumol, Indrans, Kalasala Babu, Sudheer Karamana		
D E C E M B E R	15	Love Bonda	Rajesh Crown	Karthik Sree, Dona Sanker, Madhu Pattathanam		
D E C E M B E R	21	Masterpiece	Ajay Vasudev	Mammootty, Unni Mukundan, Varalaxmi Sarathkumar, Poonam Bajwa, Maqbool Salmaan		
D E C E M B E R	22	Aadu 2	Midhun Manuel Thomas	Jayasurya, Dharmajan Bolgatty, Saiju Kurup, Vineeth Mohan, Bhagath Manuel, Vijay Babu, Swathi Reddy		
D E C E M B E R	22	Aana Alaralodalaral	Dileep Mohan	Vineeth Sreenivasan, Anu Sithara, Suraj Venjaramoodu, Hareesh Perumanna, Mamukkoya, Innocent		
D E C E M B E R	22	Mayanadi	Aashiq Abu	Tovino Thomas, Aishwarya Lekshmi, Harish Uthaman, Leona Lishoy		
D E C E M B E R	22	Vimaanam	Pradeep M. Nair	Prithviraj Sukumaran, Saiju Kurup, Durga Krishna, Anarkali Marikar, Sudheer Karamana		
D E C E M B E R	29	Vishwaguru	Vijeesh Mani	Purushothaman Kainakkari, Gandhiyan Chacha Sivarajan, Kaladharan, Kalanilayam Ramachandran		

== Dubbed films ==
Movies dubbed into Malayalam
Opening	Title	Director(s)	Original film		Cast	Ref.
Opening	Title	Director(s)	Film	Language	Cast	Ref.
28 April	Baahubali: The Conclusion	S. S. Rajamouli	Baahubali: The Conclusion	Telugu / Tamil	Prabhas, Rana Daggubati, Anushka Shetty, Tamannaah, Ramya Krishnan, Sathyaraj	
26 May	Sachin: A Billion Dreams	James Erskine	Sachin: A Billion Dreams	Hindi	Sachin Tendulkar, Arjun Tendulkar, Mayuresh Pem, Mahendra Singh Dhoni	
7 July	Mom	Ravi Udaywar	Mom	Hindi	Sridevi	
14 July	DJ: Dhruvaraja Jagannath	Harish Shankar	DJ: Duvvada Jagannadham	Telugu	Allu Arjun, Pooja Hegde, Rao Ramesh, Subbaraju, Chandra Mohan, Murali Sharma	

== Notable deaths ==
Celebrity deaths that occurred during the year
Month	Date	Name	Age	Profession	Notable films	Ref.
January	6	Om Puri	66	Actor	Puravrutham • Samvalsarangal • Aadupuliyattam	
February	26	Thavakkalai (Chittibabu)	42	Actor	Vanitha Police• Gandhinagaril Unniyarcha	
March	13	Diphan	47	Director	Puthiya Mukham • Hero • SIM	
April	13	Munshi Venu	63	Actor	Chotta Mumbai • Pachakuthira • Immanuel • Honey Bee 2: Celebrations	
May	9	C. Ramachandra Menon	88	Cinematographer	Ummachu • Ningalenne Communistakki • Eeta	
May	10	A.V. Sasidharan	43	Director	Olipporu	
May	30	Valiyaveettil Siraj	60	Producer	Aparichithan • Rajamanikyam • Prajapathi	
June	9	G. Hiran	53	Script Writer	Kaazhchakkappuram • Kalyana Unnikal • Mayakazhcha	
June	25	K. R. Mohanan	69	Director	Ashwathama• Purushartham • Swaroopam	
July	26	CP Khadeeja	77	Actress	Viruthan Shanku• Velutha Kathreena • Thenmavin Kombath	
October	24	I. V. Sasi	69	Director	Avalude Ravukal • Itha Ivide Vare • Eeta • Aalkkoottathil Thaniye • Vartha • 1921 • Mrigaya • Inspector Balram • Devasuram	
November	4	Vettur Purushan	69	Actor	Albhutha Dweep	
November	28	Thodupuzha Vasanthi	65	Actress	Yavanika • Poochakkoru Mookkuthi • Ithu Thaanda Police	
November	30	Kalabhavan Abi	52	Actor, Singer	Kasarkode Khaderbai • Mimics Action 500 • Kireedamillatha Rajakkanmar• James Bond • Happy Wedding • Thrissivaperoor Kliptham • Rasikan • Thanthonni • Kichamani MBA	
December	27	U.C. Roshan	55	Director	Thamburaan • Omanikkaanoru Shishiram • High Range • Mangalya Pallakku	
