= Gauri Shankar =

Gauri Shankar may refer to:

== Places ==
- Gaurishankar, a mountain
- Gaurishankar, Dolakha, a village
- Gaurishankar, Sarlahi, former village development committee

== People ==
- Gauri Shankar Rai (1924–1991), Indian politician, member of the 6th Lok Sabha during 1977–79, representing Ghazipur constituency of Uttar Pradesh
- Gauri Shankar Pandey, Indian politician and a former Minister of Bihar
- Gauri Shankar (chess player) (born 1992), Indian chess player, FIDE Master
- Gauri Shankar (serial killer) (1954–1995), Indian serial killer, known as "Auto Shankar"
- Gauri Shankar Kalita (1955–2010), Indian journalist
- Gauri Shankar Khadka, Nepalese politician, belonging to the Communist Party of Nepal (Maoist)
- Gauri Shankar Chaudhary, Nepalese Politician, former agriculture minister

== Other ==
- Auto Shankar (film), a 2005 Indian film by D. Rajendra Babu about Auto Shankar
- Auto Shankar (TV series), a 2019 Indian crime thriller web series about Auto Shankar
- VT-DJJ "Gauri Shankar", the aircraft involved in Air India Flight 403
- GauriShankar, 2025 Indian film

== See also ==
- Gowrishankar (disambiguation)
