= Kozhikode Sarada =

Indian Malayalam actress

- Born: 1937; Kozhikode, Kerala, India
- Died: 8 November 2021 (aged 83–84)
- Occupation: Actress
- Years active: 1979–2021

Kozhikode Sarada (1937 – 8 November 2021) was an Indian Malayalam film actress. She has appeared in over 90 Malayalam films in a career spanning over four decades. She started her career as a stage actress. Sarada made her debut in Malayalam films with the film Angakkuri in 1979. She is known for appearing in films such as Kuttisrank, Anyarude Bhoomi, Sallapam Anubandham, Ulsavapittennu and Kilichundan Mambapazham. Sarada's role in Sallapam as the mother of Manoj K Jayan was praised by critics. She is also known for appearing in several Malayalam serials. She is a recipient of the Kerala Sangeetha Nataka Akademi Award (2016).

== Filmography ==
Year	Title	Role	Notes
1979	Angakkuri		
1979	Anyarude Bhoomi		
1985	Anubandham		
1985	Idanilangal		
1985	Angadikkappurathu		
1986	Njan Kathorthirikkum		
1987	Naalkavala		
1987	Adimakal Udamakal		
1988	Dhinarathrangal		
1988	Mrithunjayam		
1989	Ulsavapittennu		
1991	Perumthachan		
1992	Sadayam		
1992	Daivathinte Vikrithikal		
1993	Naaraayam		
1995	Thumboli Kadappuram		
1996	Sallapam	Divakaran's mother	
1997	Kudamattam		
1997	Bhoothakkannadi		
1997	Lelam		
1997	Asuravamsam		
1997	Ikkareyanente Manasam		
1997	Siamese Irattakal		
1997	Kalyanapittennu		
1997	Guru Sishyan		
1998	Thirakalkkappuram		
1999	Kannezhuthi Pottum Thottu		
2000	Nadan Pennum Natupramaniyum		
2000	Oru Cheru Punchiri		
2000	Vinayapoorvam Vidhyaadharan	Kalliyankattu Neeli	
2000	Varnakkazhchakal	Kali	
2000	Nalacharitham Naalam Divasam		
2001	Nariman		
2002	Kattuchembakam	Chandru's mother	
2002	Savithriyude Aranjanam		
2002	Kaashilatheyum Jeevikkam		
2003	Kilichundan Mampazham		
2003	Ammakilikkoodu	Kumari	
2003	Choonda		
2003	Cheri		
2003	Malsaram		
2003	Sahodaran Sahadevan		
2004	The Journey	Kaakkathi	
2004	Kanninum Kannadikkum		
2004	Perumazhakkalam		
2004	Maratha Nadu		
2005	Chandrolsavam		
2005	Rappakal	Janu	
2005	Annorikkal		
2005	Makalkku	Nurse	
2005	Otta Nanayam		
2006	Pakal		
2006	Vargam		
2006	Pachakuthira	Junior Artist	
2007	Nagaram		
2007	Komban		
2008	Malabar Wedding		
2008	Thirakkatha		
2008	Mayabazar		
2008	Kerala Cafe	Servant	Segment : Bridge
2008	Shalabam		
2008	Chandranilekkoru Vazhi		
2009	Aayirathil Oruvan	Cheeru Valiyamma	
2009	Rahasya Police	Velutha	
2009	Anamika		
2010	Kutty Srank	Kunji Therutha	
2010	Yugapurushan		
2010	Njan Sanchari		
2011	Adimadhyantham		
2012	Thappana		
2012	Doctor Innocentanu	Dakshayaniyamma	
2012	Josettante Hero	Saradamma	
2013	Mukhamoodikal	Naani	
2013	Thekku Thekkoru Deshathu		
2013	Mizhi		
2014	To Noora with Love	Naniyamma	
2014	Munnariyippu	Ramani's mother	
2015	Ennu Ninte Moideen	Villager	
2015	Ennum Eppozhum	Deepa's client	
2015	Urumbukal Urangarilla		
2016	Jalam	Dinakaran's mother	
2016	Aakashathinum Bhoomikkumidayil		
2016	Pa Va	Thresia	
2016	Mikki		
2017	Rakshadhikari Baiju Oppu		
2017	Munthirivallikal Thalirkkumbol		
2017	Ancharem Onnum Arara Kunchariye Onnu Mareda		
2018	Premasoothram	Old Lady	
2018	Lolans		
2018	Oru Visheshapetta Biriyani Kissa		
2018	Mottitta Mullakal		
2018	Karinkannan		
2019	Kosrakollikal		
2019	Siddharthan Enna Njan	Janaki	
2019	Madhura Raja		
2021	Marutha		
2021	Jara	Old lady	Short film
2022	Kannadi		

== TV serials ==
Year	Serial title	Channel	Notes
2005	Ormma	Asianet	
2007	Nombarappoovu	Asianet	
2007	Minnal Kesari	Surya TV	
2009	Bhamini Tholkkarilla	Asianet	
2014	M80 Moosa	Media One TV	
2016	Chechiyamma	Surya TV	
2018-2020	Neelakkuyil	Asianet	
2021	Priyankari	Flowers TV	

== Dramas ==
- Sooryan Udhikkatha Rajyam
