= Amala (film) =

2023 Indian film by Nishad Ebrahim

- Theatrical release poster
- Directed by: Nishad Ebrahim
- Written by: Nishad Ebrahim
- Produced by: Muhsina Nishad Ebrahim
- Starring: Srikanth; Rajisha Vijayan; Anarkali Marikar; Appani Sarath
- Cinematography: Abhilash Sankar
- Edited by: Noufal Abdullah
- Music by: Gopi Sundar (songs); Lijin Bambino (score)
- Production company: Mascot Productions
- Release date: 16 June 2023
- Running time: 118 minutes
- Country: India
- Language: Malayalam

Amala is a 2023 Indian Malayalam-language thriller film directed by Nishad Ebrahim, starring Srikanth, Rajisha Vijayan, Anarkali Marikar and Appani Sarath. The film was an official selection at 2021 Chennai International Film Festival.

The film was scheduled to release on 26 May 2023, but was postponed and the film was released on 16 June 2023.

== Plot ==
Amala focus on an investigation of a murder with ACP Akbar Ali is assigned to find the murderer. Meantime, inside the forest, lives two girls alone in a house. Akbar Ali finds out some similarities in both the cases and the presence of a psycho-killer comes into the picture. The investigation leads to the childhood of the psycho-killer and it opens up the pandora of the mental state of the murderer who still have evil plans on many, whom he believe have destroyed his childhood.

== Cast ==
- Srikanth as ACP Akbar Ali IPS
- Rajisha Vijayan as Amala (cameo appearance)
- Anarkali Marikar as Sherin
- Nandini Sree as Amala, Sherin's friend
- Appani Sarath as Basil Jose
  - Vaishnav as Young Basil
- Bitto Davis as SI George
- Sajitha Madathil as Sister
- Shuhaib Embichi
- Naif Noushad
- Ann Mariya as Amala Joseph

== Production ==
Tamil actor Srikanth was signed to play the lead role, alongside Anarkali Marikar and Appani Sarath, who were already cast in the film. Sajitha Madathil later joined the cast, and Gopi Sundar was signed as the film's music director. Lead actor Anarkali Marikar mentioned that Nishad Ebrahim and Muhsina Nishad Ebrahim have been involved in the production of Amala for over 6 years. Anarkali Marikar and Appani Sarath were the first actors to sign for Amala in 2017.

== Reception ==
Aswin Bharadwaj from Lensmenreviews gave a thumbs-down to the film, stating it as a thriller that becomes highly annoying due to amateur presentation, despite having an ambitious one-liner. Arun Ramachandran of South First wrote that the film is a decent watch about serial killings, featuring an intense story that picks up after the interval block. He also praised Appani Sharath's performance.
