= Pani Paali =

Rap song by Neeraj Madhav

"Panipaali"

Song by Neeraj Madhav
- Language: Malayalam
- Released: June 28, 2020
- Genre: Rap
- Length: 3:50
- Label: MAD.V Records
- Songwriter: Neeraj Madhav
- Producer: Arcado

Music video
- Pani Paali Official Music Video on YouTube

Panipaali is a Malayalam rap song written and composed by Malayalam film actor Neeraj Madhav. The music production of the song was done by Anand "Arcado" Seetharaman. Music was mastered by Ribin Richard and additional sound design was done by Vignesh R.K. (Sapthaa Records). (Note: Multiple resources related to article "Pani Pali")

== Pani Paali 2 ==
"Panipaali 2"

Song by Neeraj Madhav
- Language: Malayalam
- Released: November 20, 2021
- Genre: Rap
- Length: 4:19
- Label: MAD.V Records
- Songwriter: Neeraj Madhav
- Producer: Arcado

Music video
- Pani Paali 2 Official Music Video on YouTube

Pani Paali 2 is the second part of Pani Paali Music Video. Pani Paali 2 released in 20 November 2021 in YouTube channel of Neeraj Madhav.
