= Ole Kanda Naal =

2021 Malayalam film

- Directed by: Musthafa Gutz
- Produced by: Latha Sajeev
- Starring: Jothish Jo; Krishnapriya; Santhosh Keezhattoor
- Cinematography: Shihab Ongallur
- Edited by: Anand Bodh
- Music by: Hesham Abdul Wahab
- Production company: Gendrend Movies
- Release date: 19 March 2021
- Country: India
- Language: Malayalam

Ole Kanda Naal (English:The day I met her) is a 2021 Malayalam romantic film directed by Musthafa Gutz. The movie has debutants Jothish Jo and Krishnapriya in the lead roles along with Santhosh Keezhattoor, Shivaji Guruvayoor and Neena Kurup in the main supporting roles. Produced by Lata Sajeev under the banner of Gendrend Frames, the movie was released on 19 March 2021.

== Synopsis ==
The movie takes place in a campus in Palakkad district of Kerala. A Muslim girl comes from an Orthodox family to join the college and falls in love with her collegemate Adhi. This is followed by a serious of events.

== Cast ==
- Jyothish Goe
- Krishnapriya
- Santhosh Keezhattoor
- Shivaji Guruvayur
- Neena Kurup
