= Gaganachari =

2024 Indian film

- Theatrical release poster
- Directed by: Arun Chandu
- Written by: Siva Sai; Arun Chandu
- Produced by: Vinayaka Ajith
- Starring: K. B. Ganesh Kumar; Gokul Suresh; Aju Varghese; Anarkali Marikar
- Cinematography: Surjith S. Pai
- Edited by: Aravind Manmadhan
- Music by: Sankar Sharma
- Production companies: Ajith Vinayaka Films; Krishand Films
- Release date: 21 June 2024
- Running time: 115 minutes
- Country: India
- Language: Malayalam

Gaganachari (transl. Celestial traveller) is a 2024 Indian Malayalam-language science fiction mockumentary film directed by Arun Chandu, who wrote the screenplay with Siva Sai. It is set in 2050s Kerala where three bachelors meet a mysterious alien. The film stars K. B. Ganesh Kumar, Gokul Suresh, Aju Varghese and Anarkali Marikar.

The film was theatrically released on 21 June 2024.

== Plot ==
In 2050, global society has collapsed due to environmental and political disasters. Alien megastructures now loom over Earth's surface, and global authorities are aggressively hunting extraterrestrials. In Kerala, a local political outfit named Ajayya Sena claims to protect the public from alien threats while acting as moral police. A team of documentary filmmakers travel to interview Major Victor Vasudevan, a retired soldier known as the "alien hunter" for surviving an alleged alien attack in 2030. He now lives in a bunker on a remote island with his nephew Alan John Valamparambil and their cook, Vaibhav "Vibe".

Victor tries to follow traditional Kerala values and dreams of migrating to the moon, now a human colony. He is assisted by an AI named Raghavan. Victor spends his time painting nude portraits of women, and sleeps in a preservation pod to maintain his youth. Vibe leads a playboy lifestyle, while Alan longs for romantic connection. Two corrupt police officers, Rage Kurup and Potti Ambu Madathil, regularly visit to extort them, abusing their unchecked authority.

One night, Vibe returns from a party with no memory of how he got home. The group discovers a mute, blue-haired woman inside their bunker, who has eaten Victor's cat, Bhavani. She is a humanoid alien fugitive, misled by Vibe into thinking he would help her reach a station. Her emotional responses cause electromagnetic pulses, which trigger flickering lights and can expose her location to the authorities. The men choose to hide her and call her "Alieamma" (alien + amma).

The group tries to care for Alieamma, feeding her cat food and letting her watch old Malayalam films. Alan develops feelings for her. Alieamma gives Alan a damaged device to help her communicate. Vibe repairs it but gives her a voice with maternal cadence, to Alan's dismay. Alieamma tells them her species is peaceful and explains how human theories about their origins are wrong. Long ago, humans and her kind coexisted as sibling species on another planet. After draining their planet, humans had fled to Earth. Now, her species has repeated humans' mistake and come to Earth in search of refuge.

Once, Vibe tries to lead Alieamma to the authorities. Alieamma erases his memory with a touch, but restores it out of pity. Later, Alan becomes heartbroken when he discovers she posed nude for Victor, but Victor explains that he never looks at the actual bodies of his muses. Instead, he always imagines and paints his wife's body from memory.

Kurup and Potti eventually kidnap Alieamma, and Potti begins a ritual to "cleanse" her. Alan finds her in distress and knocks the officers unconscious with a wooden log. The Ajayya Sena arrives wearing alien costumes. Posing as protectors, they were the real troublemakers, dressing up as aliens to create fear. Alieamma defends herself and the group by flying into the sky, and overpowers the Sena reinforcements at their residence. She asks the men to help her reach a spacecraft visible in the sky. They agree, and she thanks them before departing Earth.

Victor finally achieves his dream of going to the moon. Alan, heartbroken, sends hundreds of messages to Alieamma through Raghavan. On her home planet, inhabited by giant cats, Alieamma receives Alan's first message and smiles when she hears that he misses her.

== Cast ==
- K. B. Ganesh Kumar as Major. Victor Vasudevan
- Gokul Suresh as Allen Jose
- Aju Varghese as Vaibhav Vidyanathan aka Vibe
- Anarkali Marikar as Alien Aliyamma (voiced by Mallika Sukumaran)
- Abraham Evangeline Joseph as voice for Raghavan, the AI
- Anantharaman Ajay as Documentary Host
- John Kaippallil as Rage
- Suresh Gopi as Maniyan Chittappan (photo presence)

== Release ==
The film was premiered on 7 January 2024 at the PVR Cinemas at Lulu Mall Kochi in association with Kerala Pop Con 2024. The film was released worldwide on 21 June 2024.

=== Home media ===
The film began streaming on Amazon Prime Video from 26 October 2024.

== Accolades ==
Accolades received by Avatar (2009 film)
Award / Film festival	Date of ceremony	Category	Recipient(s)	Result	Ref.
Art Blocks International Film Festival	October - November 2022	Best Feature Film	Gaganachari	Won	
Kerala State Film Awards	August 16, 2024	Special Mentions - Direction	Arun Chandu	Won	

== Reception ==
=== Box office ===
The film opened with a collection of ₹4 lakhs on opening day and ₹12 lakhs on second day and as of 27 June 2024, film collected ₹92 lakhs worldwide. As of 3 July 2024, film collected ₹1.53 crore and as of 10 July 2024 the film collected worldwide gross of ₹2.2 crore.

=== Critical response ===
The Hindu gave positive review calling it a fun-filled science fiction film.

== Future ==
Director Arun Chandu and the team behind Gaganachari are planning to expand the Gaganachari universe with their next feature, starring actor Suresh Gopi in the lead role within the same storyline.
