= Naanga =

2012 Indian film by Selva

- Poster
- Directed by: Selvaa
- Written by: Selvaa
- Starring: Nivas; Vinod; Sanjay Krishna; Uday; Muneesh; Shakir; Varun; Virumandi; Vishnupriya; Shivani Bhai; Vaidehi; Arasi; Ashwin Raja
- Cinematography: B. Balamurugan
- Edited by: Suresh Urs
- Music by: Bala Bharathi
- Production company: Cinema Kottagai
- Release date: 9 March 2012
- Country: India
- Language: Tamil

Naanga (transl. We) is a 2012 Indian Tamil language film directed by Selvaa, featuring an ensemble cast of newcomers including Nivas, Uday, Vishnupriya and Shivani Bhai alongside Ashwin Raja. The film, notably Selva's 25th directorial, revolves around a group of alumni from the 1985 batch of a Tiruchi college, who meet again in 2011. It was released on 9 March 2012.

== Plot ==
Five college friends reunite after many years to help Devi, one of their friends who has woken up from a coma, get back with her lover, Babu.

== Cast ==
- Nivas as Mani
- Vinod as Daya
- Sanjay Krishna as Chandran
- Uday as Babu
- Muneesh as Baasha
- Shakir
- Varun
- Virumandi
- Vishnupriya as Devi
- Shivani Bhai
- Vaidehi
- Arasi
- Kasthuri
- Hema Soundar
- Raj Kapoor
- K. S. G. Venkatesh
- Ashwin Raja
- Chelladurai
- Scissor Manohar
- Raviraj
- Lizzie as Reporter

== Production ==
For the lead roles, Selva cast the children of noted film personalities; Sanjay Krishna, son of actor-director Santhana Bharathi; Nivas, actor Adithan's son; Muneesh, who was Telugu music composer Vasu Rao's son; production executive Gurusamy's son Vinod and film distributor Rajagopal's son Uday. The antagonist was played by popular playback singer Mano's son Shakir. Shivani Bhai, who enacted one of the heroines, also made her debut in Tamil films.

Bala Bharathy and Balamurugan, who had been part of Selva's Amaravathi (1993), were signed on as the composer and cinematographer, respectively, rejoining with Selva after nearly twenty years.

== Soundtrack ==
Soundtrack was composed by Balabharathi. He composed eights songs for the film in the same ragas used by Ilaiyaraaja in the 1980s.

- "Devadhaya" – Karthik
- "Adiye Pottapulla" – Solar Sai, Cimon
- "Muthamizhey" – Ravi, Anita Suresh
- "Enadhu Nenjilay" – Haricharan, Mumbai Sailaja Subramaniam
- "Idhazhil" – Karthik, Chinmayi
- "Engay Engay" – Vijay Prakash, Mumbai Sailaja Subramaniam
- "Romance Rowdy" – Benny Dayal
- "Kadhalanay" – Mumbai Sailaja Subramaniam

== Reception ==
M Suganth from The Times of India gave 3 out of 5 and said: "While the broad strokes with which he paints this story let you get the rough feel of the film, "Naanga" doesn't really leave you wistful and yearning for a charming, not-so-distant past". The Hindu's Malathi Rangarajan in her review wrote: "A host of new faces, a fresh approach to narration, a rare storyline that gives equal importance to an entire group of friends — five in all — decent portrayals, a few clichés and a dose of melodrama comprise Selva's Naanga".
