= Soul Stories =

Indian Malayalam language web series

- Genre: Anthology; Drama
- Created by: Sanil Kalathil
- Written by: Libin Varghese
- Directed by: Sanil Kalathil
- Starring: Suhasini Maniratnam; Anarkali Marikar; Renji Panicker; Dayyana Hameed; Gopika Manjusha
- Music by: Ifthi
- Country of origin: India
- Original language: Malayalam
- No. of seasons: 1
- No. of episodes: 5

Production
- Cinematography: Sajan Kalathil
- Editor: Anzar Chennatt
- Running time: 25–35 minutes
- Production company: manoramaMAX

Original release
- Network: manoramaMAX
- Release: 18 October 2024

Soul Stories is a 2024 Malayalam-language anthology drama web series with five episodes where each story focus on a socially relevant subject that affects the life of women like sexuality, class difference, gender discrimination and consent. It is directed by Sanil Kalathil.

== Plot ==
The anthology series is divided into five short stories, each exploring the female psyche and body.

== Cast ==
- Suhasini Maniratnam as Rani
- Anarkali Marikar as Vaishnavi
- Dayyana Hameed as Arundhathi
- Renji Panicker
- RJ Karthik
- Wafa Khatheeja
- Libin Varghese as Josettan (also the series writer)
- Asha Madathil
- Sminu Sijo
- Gopika Manjusha as Daisy
- Nimna Fathoomi as Raiza

== Release ==
The web weries was released on manoramaMAX OTT platform on October 18, 2024.

== Reception ==
"Soul Stories" garnered a generally positive reception upon its release on manoramaMAX, with critics and audiences praising its focus on diverse female experiences and its thought-provoking narratives.

Critical Response:

- Themes and Storytelling: The web series was lauded for its exploration of socially relevant subjects impacting women, such as sexuality, class differences, gender discrimination, and consent. Reviewers noted how the anthology format allowed for a sensitive and sensible, though not always smooth, portrayal of the female psyche and body. For instance, a review by Onmanorama highlighted the series' attempt to provide a "short guide to understanding women."
- Performances: The ensemble cast, including Anarkali Marikar, Suhasini Maniratnam, Dayyana Hameed, and Renji Panicker, received appreciation for their nuanced performances. Suhasini Maniratnam's portrayal of a classical dancer and Dayyana Hameed's performance in a daring segment exploring a same-sex relationship were particularly highlighted by critics, including those from OTTPlay.
- Direction: Sanil Kalathil's direction was commended for its honest approach to depicting the travails of women and for staying true to the core idea of the series. As noted by OTTPlay, Kalathil "stays honest to the core idea as it portrays the travails of women."
- Specific Episodes: Individual episodes were often singled out for their impact. "Kiss of Kochi," starring Anarkali Marikar, was praised for its unique and thought-provoking take on consent, with Onmanorama stating it offers a "unique view of consent that is both straightforward and thought-provoking." "Simhathinte Madiyil" was found relatable by parents of teenagers for its handling of adolescent challenges and the need for psychological help, as highlighted by Mobile Masala and Onmanorama. "Neeril Veezhum Pookkal" was noted for its bold exploration of a same-sex relationship, with Onmanorama acknowledging its "daring" nature.
