= Kirkkan =

2023 Indian film

- Release poster
- Directed by: Josh
- Written by: Josh
- Produced by: Dr.Mathew Mampra; Ajith Nair; Rj Ajeesh Saarangi; Remya Josh
- Starring: Salim Kumar; Vijayaraghavan; Kani Kusruti; Johny Antony; Anarkali Marikar
- Cinematography: Gowtham Lenin
- Edited by: Rohith VS Variyath
- Music by: Manikandan Ayyappa
- Production companies: Mampra Cinemas; Owl Media Entertainments
- Release date: 21 July 2023
- Running time: 120 minutes
- Country: India
- Language: Malayalam

Kirkkan is a 2023 Indian Malayalam-language crime thriller film written and directed by Josh (in his feature film debut). The film stars Vijayaraghavan, Salim Kumar, Kani Kusruti, Johny Antony, Anarkali Marikar, Appani Sarath, Meera Vasudev, and Maqbool Salmaan in lead roles. The music and background score was composed by Manikandan Ayyappa.

The film is produced under the banners of Mampra Cinemas and Owl Media Entertainments. It is produced by Dr. Mathew Mampra and co-produced by Ajith Nair, Rj Ajeesh Saarangi, and Remya Josh.

== Plot ==
The death of a girl and the further police investigation. It is based on a true incident happened near Kottayam district of Kerala.

== Cast ==
- Salim Kumar as Kusumakumar Warrier
- Anarkali Marikar as Rachel and Rebecca

== Music ==
The soundtrack was composed by Manikandan Ayyappa, with lyrics written by Jyothish kaashi, Rj Ajeesh Saarangi, Sagar Bharatheeyam.

Track listing
No.	Title	Lyrics	Singer(s)	Length
1.	"Kaalame"	Jyothish T Kashi	Mridula Warrier, Mohammed Maqbool Mansoor	3:14
2.	"Kirkan"	RJ Ajeesh Sarangi, Sagar Bharatheeyam	Appani Sarath	2:25
Total length:				5:39

== Release ==
=== Theatrical ===
The film was released on 21 July 2023. Other than in Malayalam, it is released in 3 other languages; Tamil, Telugu, and Kannada.

== Awards ==
- 2023 Kerala Film Critics Awards:

Special jury award for Mathew Mapmra.

Best Playback singer Female: Mridula Warrier for the song Kalame.
