= Gowrishankar =

Gowrishankar may refer to:

- Annapoorna Gowrishankar, a hotel chain
- Jayaraman Gowrishankar, Indian medical microbiologist
- Gawrishankar Udayshankar, Indian politician

== See also ==
- Gauri Shankar (disambiguation)
