= Sallapam =

- Poster
- Directed by: Sundar Das
- Written by: A. K. Lohithadas
- Produced by: N. Krishnakumar (Kireedam Unni)
- Starring: Manoj K. Jayan; Dileep; Manju Warrier; Bindu Panicker; N. F. Varghese
- Cinematography: Ramachandra Babu
- Edited by: G. Murali
- Music by: Johnson
- Distributed by: Kripa Films
- Release date: 22 March 1996
- Running time: 155 minutes
- Country: India
- Language: Malayalam

Sallapam (സല്ലാപം, Translation: Conversation) is a 1996 Malayalam-language romantic drama film directed by Sundar Das (in his directorial debut) and written by A. K. Lohithadas, starring Manoj K. Jayan, Dileep and Manju Warrier in the lead roles. The music was composed by Johnson. The film was remade in Telugu as Egire Paavurama.

== Synopsis ==
Radha comes from a poor family and dreams of becoming a great singer. She falls in love with Sasikumar, who calls himself Junior Yesudas. Sasikumar is also from a poor family. When Radha asks Sasikumar that they should marry, he makes excuses, saying he has a lot of responsibilities and does not have any money. Radha decides to commit suicide but is rescued by her cousin, who she realizes was in love with her.

== Cast ==
- Dileep as Sasikumar / Junior Yesudas
- Manoj K. Jayan as Divakaran
- Manju Warrier as Radha (voice-over by Sreeja)
- Bindu Panicker as Padmini
- Kozhikode Sarada as Divakaran's Mom
- Mala Aravindan as Kunjookuttan Ashaari
- N. F. Varghese as Chandran Nair
- Valsala Menon as Leelavathi Thampuratti
- Abubakkar as Damodaran
- Kalabhavan Mani as Rajappan
- Jagannatha Varma as Prabhakara Varma
- Oduvil Unnikrishnan as Madhava Menon
- Salu Kuttanadu as Raghavan
- Mammukoya as Railway worker
- Kaithapram Damodaran Namboothiri as Singer at the temple
- Ottapalam Pappan
- Manju Satheesh as Latha, Leelavathi's daughter

== Music ==
The songs were composed by Johnson, with lyrics by Kaithapram Damodaran Namboothiri.

Track	Song	Artist(s)	Raga
1	"Chandana Cholayil"	K. J. Yesudas	Pahadi
2	"Ponnil Kulichu"	K. J. Yesudas, K. S. Chithra	Darbari Kanada
3	"Panchavarna"	K. S. Chithra	Sudha Dhanyasi
4	"Padha Smaranasugham"	K. J. Yesudas	Latangi
5	"Ponnil Kulichu"	K. S. Chithra	Darbari Kanada
6	"Ponnil Kulichu (Bit)"	K. J. Yesudas, K. S. Chithra	Darbari Kanada

== Box office ==
The film became both a critical and commercial success.
