= Nilavariyathe =

- Film poster
- Directed by: Utpal V Nayanar
- Written by: Suraj Mavila
- Produced by: Biju V Mathai; Kunjambu Nair
- Starring: Anumol; Bala; Indrans; Sudheer Karamana; Kalasala Babu; Santhosh Keezhattoor; Shivani Bhai
- Cinematography: Santhosh Pathanamthitta; Sajan Kalathil
- Edited by: PC Mohanan
- Music by: Songs: Kanjangad Ramachandran; Background Score: Sreevalsan J. Menon
- Release date: December 8, 2017
- Country: India
- Language: Malayalam

Nilavariyathe is a 2017 Malayalam language film produced by Biju V Mathai and Kunjambu Nair. The film is directed by Utpal V Nayanar, and stars Anumol and Bala in the lead roles, along with Indrans, Sudheer Karamana, Kalasala Babu, Santhosh Keezhattoor and Shivani Bhai. The music is composed by Kanjangad Ramachandran. The film is based on a story written by Suraj Mavila.

== Plot ==
The story is based on the caste system that was prevalent in northern districts of Malabar in Kerala many years back. The story is about how the caste system affects Paata's and Pokkan's love affair. Paata and Pokkan are workers in Karikkot Tharavadu that is famous for Theyyam and Komaram plays. Paata falls in love with the young and handsome Pokkan and aspires to marry him. Kelu is the only person who will be happy to see them get married. But the caste differences play a major role such that Paata had no chance to marry Pokkan. Kelu along with Paata plans ways to ease the obstacles that are standing as blockades to the marriage.

== Cast ==
- Anumol as Paata
- Bala as Pokkan
- Shivani Bhai as Shivani
- Indrans
- Sona Nair
- Sajitha Madathil
- Mukundan
- Santhosh Keezhattoor
- Lakshmi Sharma
- Sudheer Karamana
- Kalasala Babu
- Sreekumar

== Soundtrack ==
- "Paalazhi Polulla" – Vijay Yesudas, Swetha Mohan
- "Thinkalkuriyum" – Vijay Yesudas
- "Kalichan Deive"- Kanhangad Ramachandran
- "Payyaram Kattile"- Swetha Mohan
