= Paippin Chuvattile Pranayam =

- Theatrical release poster
- Directed by: Domin D'Silva
- Screenplay by: Domin D'Silva; Antony Jibin
- Story by: Domin D'Silva
- Produced by: Vijayakumar Palakunnu
- Starring: Neeraj Madhav; Reba Monica John
- Cinematography: Pavi K. Pavan
- Edited by: Sandeep Nandakumar
- Music by: Bijibal
- Production company: Aishwarya Sneha Movies
- Distributed by: Aadi Release
- Release date: 24 November 2017 (India)
- Running time: 135 minutes
- Country: India
- Language: Malayalam

Paippin Chuvattile Pranayam (transl. Love under the pipe) is a 2017 Indian Malayalam-language film directed by Domin D'Silva who also co-wrote the screenplay with Antony Jibin. It stars Neeraj Madhav, Reba Monica John, Aju Varghese, Sudhi Koppa, Appani Sarath, Dharmajan Bolgatty, and Thesni Khan. The film was released in India on 24 November 2017.

== Plot ==
Paippin Chuvattile Pranayam traces the story of Govindankutty (Neeraj Madhav) and his friends who are local to the Pandarathuruth island. As the movie starts, one can see that it takes a dip into the rustic beauty of the village and the surreal experience of lake water fishing.

== Cast ==
- Neeraj Madhav as Govindankutty / Govutty
- Reba Monica John as Teena Kunjachan
- Aju Varghese as Shyam
- Sudhi Koppa as Ayyappan
- Sruthy Jayan as Remya
- Dharmajan Bolgatty as Babumon
- Thesni Khan as Filomina Kunjachan
- Appani Sarath as Keedam
- Rishi S Kumar as Bash
- Jaffer Idukki as Kunjachan
- Sethu Lakshmi as Govutty's Grandmother
- Shino Mohanlal as Shino
- Chembil Ashokan
- Narayanankutty
- Sajan Palluruthy
- Harisree Martin
- Indrans
- Pauly Valsan
- Gokulan as Villager
- Manju Sunichan
- Prarthana Sandeep

== Soundtrack ==
The songs and background score for the film were composed by Bijibal. The lyrics were written by B.K. Harinarayanan and Santhosh Varma.

Track listing
| No. | Title | Lyrics | Singer(s) | Length |
|---|---|---|---|---|
| 1. | "Aarini Yarini" | Job Kurien | Santhosh Varma | 3:56 |
| 2. | "Kaathu Kaathittu" | Bijibal, Uday Ramachandran & P.V. Siju | B.K. Harinarayanan | 3:14 |
| 3. | "Kayalirambilu" | Bijibal and Anne Amie | Santhosh Varma | 3:03 |
| 4. | "Paipin Chottilu (Theme Song)" | Sowmya Ramakrishnan | B.K. Harinarayanan | 2:59 |
| Total length: | | | | 15:12 |
