= Thrissivaperoor Kliptham =

- Theatrical release poster
- Directed by: Ratheish Kumar
- Written by: PS Rafeeque
- Produced by: Fareed Khan (producer); Shaleel Azeez
- Starring: Asif Ali; Chemban Vinod Jose; Aparna Balamurali; Baburaj; Irshad; Rony David
- Cinematography: Swaroop Philip
- Edited by: Shameer Muhammed
- Music by: Bijibal
- Production company: M-Little Star Communications
- Distributed by: Whitesands Media House
- Release date: 11 August 2017 (India)
- Running time: 150 minutes
- Country: India
- Language: Malayalam

Thrissivaperoor Kliptham (English: Thrissivaperoor Ltd.) is a 2017 Indian Malayalam-language black comedy-thriller film directed by debutant Ratheish Kumar and written by PS Rafeeque. It stars Asif Ali, Chemban Vinod Jose, Aparna Balamurali, Baburaj, Irshad and Rony David. It was produced jointly by Fareed Khan and Shaleel Azeez under the banner of Whitesands Media House. The film was released on 11 August 2017.

== Plot ==
David 'Davis' Pauly hails from Thrissur. His marriage with a lady, arranged by his brother Sensilavos, is unsuccessful, after a bottle of alcohol, which one of his 'friends' sent him as a present and he hid, breaks in the church. Davy's aunt speculates that Joy Chembadan, Davy's classmate in school and now arch-nemesis, was the one who sent it to him.

Girija 'Giri' Vallabhan is from Pattikad and is naive. He is friends with Ambiyettan, an emigrant guru from another part of Kerala, who introduces him to Davy and his gang, consisting of Bahuleyan, Philip Kannadakkaran and Alahu, after a fight in the market with Joy's henchmen.

In a parallel storyline, Bhageerathi "Baaghi" is an honorable female auto driver trying to save two young girls (who are her neighbors) from turning into prostitutes at the insistence of Ayyappan, a wicked man also Bhaagi's neighbor who is hellbent on forcing them to sell their bodies. It is also portrayed that the girls' father is in dire need of money, for which their mother, unable to pay the bills for her husband's operation, is ready to let her daughters be prostitutes.

Conflicts naturally occur between Davy and Joy. Once, when Joy orders film actress Nileena Mehndi to inaugurate his shop, he shows off and looks down on Davy for not being able to do the same. Enraged by this, Davy decided to kidnap and coerce the one responsible for helping Joy get Davy, Rent-A-Star Mansoor, Nileena Mehndi's assistant.

When Davy and their gang finally do succeed in capturing Mansoor, no matter how much they force him, he refuses to tell Nileena to back off the deal made with Joy (for which advance of 30 lakhs are collected). Infuriated, Davy barks at Sudeesh violently, forcefully stating that he was calling upon Nileena for an inauguration, and not for fornication. Unmoved by Davy's recklessness, Mansoor replies coolly, stating that although the withdrawal of Nileena's contract to Joy isn't possible, she would gladly spend a night with one person - only one person - in a one-night stand for 10 lakh rupees.

Shocked at this revelation, the gang lets him go. They, with deceit and helplessness, make up 10 lakh rupees. Amidst this, though, Joy embarrasses one of Davy's gang members by arresting him with his separated wife in a shady hotel falsely accusing him of adultery. After this, Davy swears to take revenge from Joy. They realize that only one of them can be the lucky one, so they put on a lucky draw, in which Giri is able to win. Hence, Giri heads to a hotel holding a suitcase filled with 10 lakh rupees, as per Mansoor's instructions. Meanwhile, outraged by how close he got to ruining the innocent women's lives through prostitution, Baaghi vengefully kills Ayyappan in a celebration.

A little time later, Davy and gang see on the news that Nileena will be retiring from her acting career temporarily due to cancer. Appalled, they visit the exact same hotel, where they notice that the bag of money is missing from an unconscious Giri. They investigate with the help of Kozhikkaran Cheru, Davy's friend and a local businessman, also a professional gambler and owns a local casino. Cheru tells them that Mansoor's actual name was Porinju. It is revealed that he was the driver of Cheru. Porinju stabbed Cheru and ran away with the money of Cheru.

After hearing the story of Cheru, the next day, they are able to corner Porinju (who was about to escape), where he reveals that when he went in the hotel room, even he wasn't able to find the money. Davy hands him over to Joy, who was also scammed of his money. When they reach their residence, they find Baaghi there, who confesses to have taken the money for the operation of the girls' father. She says that, in return for the money, she is willing to sleep with any one of them, for one night. But the men turn down her offer, having gained a better understanding about greed and its consequences.

In the end, Davy is reunited with his high school crush thanks to Joy, who has now understood his mistake, and it is implied that Giri and Baaghi have fallen in love with each other.

== Cast ==
- Asif Ali as Girijavallabhan 'Giri'
- Chemban Vinod Jose as David 'Davis/Davi' Pauly
- Aparna Balamurali as Bhageerathy 'Bhaagi'
- Baburaj as Joy Chembadan
- Vijayakumar
- Rony David as Philip Kannadakkaran
- Irshad as Bahuleyan
- Abi as Sensilavos Davi's Elder brother
- Sudheesh as Mansoor / Porinju
- Vineeth Mohan as Fr. Gregory Pauly
- Shilpi Sharma as Nilina Mehndi
- Parvathi T as Mini, Bhageerathy's mother
- Jewel Mary as Sunitha P.S IAS
- T G Ravi as Kozhikkaran Cheru
- Meghanathan as Subramanian
- Nandu as Ambiyettan
- Zarina Wahab as Ammachi
- Rachana Narayanankutty
- Sreejith Ravi as S.I Sheherladen / Cherlaapu
- Alexander Prasanth
- Jayaraj Warrier
- Sunil Sukhada
- Gilu Joseph as Damayanthi
- Neeraja Rajendran as Giri's mother
- Arya Salim as Police constable Saramma
- Vijilesh Karayad
- Shibil Paravath as Schoolmate

== Production ==
The film is produced by Fareed Khan and Shaleel Azeez under the banner of Whitesands Media House. Asif Ali and Aparna Balamurali plays the lead roles. In September 2016, Shooting began in Thrissur.

== Soundtrack ==
All songs were composed by Bijibal.

Track	Song title	Lyrics	Singer
1	"Kaanthaa"	Traditional folk song	Vipin Lal
2	"Manga Poolu Poloru"	PS Rafeeque	Bijibal
3	"Oruthiri Aasha"	B. K. Harinarayanan	Vivek Moozhikulam
4	"Puthiyoru Kada"	P. S. Rafeeque	Sannidaanandan
5	"Thrissooru"	P. S. Rafeeque	Pushpavathi
6	"Venne Vennakkal"	P. S. Rafeeque	Sayanora Philip
