= Auto Shankar =

Indian criminal

- Born: Gowri Shankar; 21 January 1954; Kangeyanallur, Vellore, India
- Died: 27 April 1995 (aged 41); Salem Central Prison, Tamil Nadu, India
- Status: Executed by hanging
- Conviction: Murder (6 counts)
- Penalty: Death

Details
- Victims: 6
- Span of crimes: 1975–1989
- Country: India
- State: Tamil Nadu

Gowri Shankar (21 January 1954 – 27 April 1995), better known as 'Auto' Shankar, was an Indian criminal, murderer and gangster from Tamil Nadu, who was active in Chennai throughout the 1970s and 1980s.

== Early and personal life ==
Shankar was born in Kangeyanallur, Vellore. While he was in Pre-University College, his father left the family for Odisha. In the early 1970s, he came to Chennai, first living in a Mylapore slum before moving to the fast-developing area of Thiruvanmiyur on the outskirts of South Chennai. Shankar had several wives. He married his first wife, Jagadeeswari, early in his criminal career and had 4 children with her. The marriage ended due to her suicide by self-immolation. His third wife, Lalitha, was a performer at a cabaret club he frequented.

== Criminal history ==
He survived by peddling cycle rickshaws, and later began to operate an auto rickshaw, from which he got his nickname.

At the time, the area was a criminal hotbed and Shankar began transporting illegal liquor (prohibition being in force at the time), and Shankar soon realised that prostitution was more profitable with lower risks, due to its association with politically influential people who could keep the police in check. His gang eliminated rivals either through the police force or through murder. An incident in which a rival gangster named Babu was murdered in the early 1980s, and which was ultimately covered up led Shankar to focus more on prostitution.

Shankar's third wife, Lalitha, ran off with a pimp and Shankar's friend, Sudalaimuthu, and started their own outfit in the sex trade. An enraged Shankar planned his revenge by pretending to reconcile with the two through mutual friends. One night in October 1987, he invited her to one of his places in Periyar Nagar, then killed and buried her. He then rented the house to an old widow for Rs. 150. Shankar told Sudalai that Lalitha was on an all-India tour with a VIP, and two months later invited him for dinner. Shankar loaded Sudalai with liquor, strangled him, burned his body, and dumped his ashes in the sea. He then had the house renovated and explained away the burn marks by claiming they were roasted meat. When Sudalai's friend Ravi confronted Shankar, Shankar killed him and buried him outside his Periyar Nagar plot. He claimed the burial was of illegal arrack that he was hiding from an upcoming police raid, and posted a false letter to his wife claiming Ravi was in fact in Mumbai.

By 1988, he had a multistorey house, cars, bikes, and connections that could do anything. On 29 May 1988, he and his gang were confronted by 3 members of a rival gang: Sampath, Mohan and Govindraj, who refused to pay for using his women and demanded protection money. Shankar invited them into his den, promising to pay them, and then beat them to death and buried them. At the end of June, Sampath's wife Vijaya filed a complaint with Mylapore police that her husband was missing and Shankar could be responsible. She was advised to file a complaint with Thiruvanmiyur police instead, who arrested Shankar on charges of causing a nuisance and released him. Vijaya sent a petition to the governor, who ordered the police to investigate Shankar. However, the reluctant police told Vijaya to not bother them with complaints. A distraught Vijaya turned to her journalist neighbour, who published an article implying they might have been murdered.

== Trial and execution ==
The Inspector General ordered a special enquiry and the deaths of the three men were discovered. When they arrested Shankar and interrogated him, he confessed to the murders and to the other three murders he had committed. However, he escaped on 20 August 1990 with his five accomplices. Shankar's trial was held at the Chengalpattu sessions court. He was sentenced to death along with two of his associates, Eldin and Shivaji, on 31 May 1991, ultimately being hanged in Salem Central Prison on 27 April 1995.

== Associates ==
In 1992, Shankar's five accomplices were sentenced to six months of Rigorous Imprisonment after having been found guilty by the Chengai-Anna District Judge N. Mohandoss. The accomplices were Shankar's brother, Mohan, Selva (alias Selvaraj) and the jail wardens Kannan, Balan and Rahim Khan. They were found guilty of criminal conspiracy and resistance or obstruction by a person to his lawful apprehension. Subsequently, Mohan was also found guilty of the six murders and was given three life sentences. Mohan had escaped from the Chennai Central Prison in August 1990 and was captured in Pune on 25 June 1992.

== Responses ==
K. Vijay Kumar, the Tamil Nadu Additional Director-General of Police, claimed that cinema was solely responsible for making Shankar a criminal. He mentioned this during a seminar on "Crime and Media" in Kerala.

The trial has become widely known across the nation since the Supreme Court invoked the American free speech doctrine and the case became oft-quoted in relation to journalistic exposés.

== In popular culture ==
- The 1990 Tamil language film Pulan Visaranai directed by R. K. Selvamani was partially inspired by Auto Shankar's crimes. Mithun Chakraborty and Shakti Kapoor starred in the 1995 Bollywood remake Ravan Raaj: A True Story.
- A documentary television series based on his life was aired on Makkal TV.
- Crime Patrol aired an episode on Sony TV based on the story of Auto Shankar.
- Appani Sarath played Auto Shankar in the 2019 ZEE5 web series Auto Shankar.
- This case was included as one of the cases in the bestselling book The Deadly Dozen: India's Most Notorious Serial Killers by Anirban Bhattacharyya, the creator-producer of the hit TV show Savdhaan India.

== See also ==
- Charles Shobraj
- Joshi-Abhyankar serial murders
- Noida serial murders
- Raman Raghav
- Capital punishment in India
- List of serial killers by country
