= Lavakusha =

- Theatrical release poster
- Directed by: Gireesh Mano
- Screenplay by: Neeraj Madhav
- Produced by: Jaison Elamgulam
- Starring: Biju Menon; Neeraj Madhav; Aju Varghese
- Cinematography: Prakash Velayudhan
- Edited by: Johnkutty
- Music by: Gopi Sundar
- Production company: RJ Creations
- Distributed by: RJ Creations; Kalasangham Films
- Release date: 19 October 2017
- Country: India
- Language: Malayalam

Lavakusha (stylized as LavaKusha) is a 2017 Indian Malayalam-language comedy buddy cop film directed by Gireesh Mano (in his directorial debut) and written by Neeraj Madhav. The film stars Biju Menon, Neeraj Madhav and Aju Varghese. The songs were composed by Gopi Sundar. The film was released in India on 19 October 2017 coinciding with Diwali. The film was a commercial success, and the makers have announced plans for a sequel.

== Summary ==
The story revolves around two happy-go-lucky undercover officers and friends, Lavan and Kushan. Things take a turn when they are approached by a mysterious guy and girl, who influence their lives in various ways.

== Cast ==
- Biju Menon as DYSP Joy Kappan/JK IPS, CBCID
- Neeraj Madhav as Lavan
- Aju Varghese as Kushan
- Deepti Sati as ASP Jennifer George IPS, CBCID / Sheetal
- Aditi Ravi as Minnah
- Vijay Babu as Cylex Abraham / Banglan
- Ashwin Kkumar as David Luke
- Major Ravi as Crime Branch SP venkat praphu IPS
- Nirmal Palazhi as Sumesh
- Anjali Nair as Vanaja Sumesh
- Thesni Khan as Sarita
- Vishnu Govindan as Freddy, David's henchman
- Gokulan as Shambu
- Akshara Kishore as Angel
- Janardhanan as Sathyan, film producer
- Sinoj Varghese as Muthu
- Neena Kurup as Nancy
- Raja Sahib as Nancy's husband
- Nandini Sree as Shalini
- Kalabhavan Haneef as T.T.R
- Madan Mohan as DYSP Ajay Gosh IPS, CBCID

== Production ==
Lavakusha is the screenwriter debut of actor Neeraj Madhav, who also starred in the lead role alongside Aju Varghese and Biju Menon.

=== Soundtrack ===
The film's soundtrack was composed by Gopi Sundar and contains two songs. The soundtrack album was released by RJ Creations label on 29 September 2017.

1. "Ayyapante Amma" (Neeraj Madhav, Aju Varghese) - 3:18
2. "LavaKusha Theme" Rzee - 3:28
3. "Ente Kayyil Onnumilla" (Atul P. M.) - 4:12

== Release ==
The film opened in theaters in India on 12 October 2017.
