= Rahasya Police =

- Directed by: K. Madhu
- Written by: S. N. Swamy
- Produced by: Siyad Koker
- Starring: Jayaram; Samvrutha Sunil; Sindhu Menon; Ananya; Shivani Bhai
- Cinematography: Venugopal
- Edited by: P.C. Mohanan
- Music by: Deepak Dev(Songs); C.Rajamani (Background Music)
- Release date: 23 July 2009
- Country: India
- Language: Malayalam

Rahasya Police is a 2009 Indian Malayalam-language crime thriller film by K. Madhu, starring Jayaram in dual roles. It also features Samvrutha Sunil, Shivani Bhai, Sindhu Menon, Ananya and Mangala.

== Plot ==
In the village of Paarvathipuram, Kaimal and Parambath Raju are fighting over a number of issues and get involved in the murder of a young girl named Bhadra. Two doppelganger cops Crime Branch DYSP Rajamani and SI Rajan, investigate the case.

== Cast ==
- Jayaram in a dual role as:
  - Crime Branch DYSP Rajamani
  - SI Rajan
- Samvrutha Sunil as Maya
- Sindhu Menon as Rajan's wife
- Ananya as Bhama
- Shivani Bhai as Manikutty
- Mangala as Bhadra
- Suraj Venjaramoodu as SI Prakash
- Harisree Ashokan as Arjunan
- Indrans as Constable Raveendran
- Sudheesh as SI Thomas
- Jagathy Sreekumar as Advocate Kunnath Kaimal
- K. B. Ganesh Kumar as Parambath Raju
- Kishor Satya as SP
- Riyaz Khan as Keshu
- Devi Chandana as Bhama's aunt
- Mala Aravindan as Pushpangathan (Pushpan)
- Rajeev Parameshwar as Sasi
- Mini Arun
- Deepika Mohan
- Manka Mahesh
