= Neeraj Madhav =

Indian actor, rapper and dancer

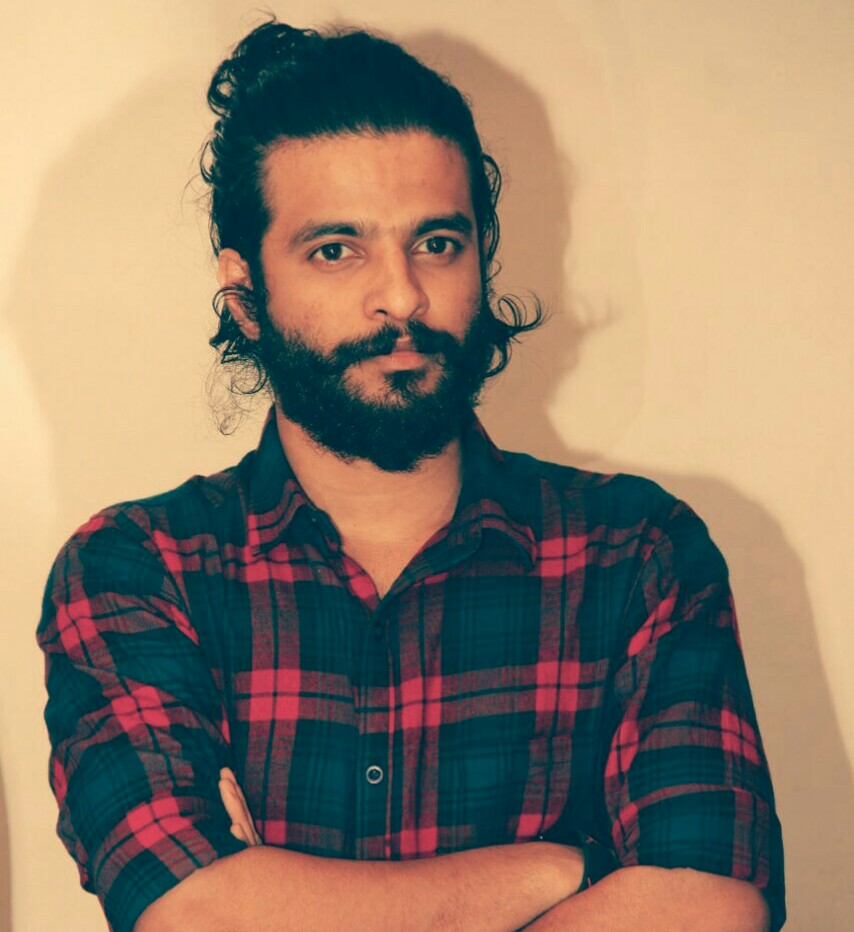
- Neeraj in 2015
- Born: Neeraj Madhav; 26 March 1990 (age 36); Kozhikode, Kerala, India
- Other name: NJ
- Education: SRM Institute of Science and Technology; School of Drama and Fine Arts, Thrissur
- Occupations: Actor; screenwriter; rapper; choreographer; dancer
- Years active: 2013–present
- Spouse: Deepthi Janardhan (m. 2018)
- Children: 1

Neeraj Madhav (born 26 March 1990), also known as NJ, is an Indian actor and rapper who predominantly works in Malayalam and Hindi films, apart from one Tamil film.

== Early life ==
Neeraj was born on 26 March 1990, in Kozhikode, Kerala into a Malayali family. He studied at St. Joseph's Boys' Higher Secondary School, Kozhikode. He graduated in Visual communications from SRM Institute of Science and Technology, Kanchipuram and later did his post-graduation in Theatre from School of Drama and Fine Arts, Thrissur. His father Dr. K. Madhavan is a veterinarian, and his mother Latha, a teacher.

The young talent started off as a dancer with the first edition of reality television programme ‘Super Dancer’ on Amrita TV and made it to the final round. Neeraj is also a trained Bharatanatyam dancer, having studied under Kalamandalam Saraswathy and her daughter, Aswathy. He is also trained in chenda and is a disciple of Kalanilayam Udayan Namboodiri.

Neeraj has a younger brother Navneeth Madhav, who is also a dancer turned actor. He has acted in films such as Shikkar, Kottarathil Kutty Bhootham, Nallavan and Manikyakkallu, and TV series such as Kuttichathan.

== Career ==
Neeraj made his entry to the Malayalam cinema industry through Raaj Prabavathy Menon's Buddy, which he was selected for through an audition. He was later noticed by director Jeethu Joseph and invited to be a part of the movies Memories and Drishyam, both of which turned out to be box office successes, with the latter becoming the highest-grossing Malayalam film ever. Neeraj played his first lead role as Govindankutty, a daily wage labourer, in the movie Paippin Chuvattile Pranayam, directed by debutant Domin D'Silva. Neeraj also acted in Abrid Shine's 1983 and Sathyan Anthikad's Oru Indian Pranayakadha.

Other noted performances of his are in Anil Radhakrishnan Menon's Sapthamashree Thaskaraha, in which Neeraj plays one of the lead characters alongside Prithviraj, Anoop Kannan's Homely Meals, and Apothecary (film), a medical drama directed by Madhav Ramadasan.

Neeraj made his debut as a dance choreographer with the film Oru Vadakkan Selfie, scripted by Vineeth Sreenivasan and directed by G. Prajith, with the hit song "Enne Thallendammava". His other releases in 2015 also include Jamna Pyari, Kunjiramayanam, Madhura Naranga, KL.10 Pathu, Charlie and Adi Kapyare Kootamani.

The movie Oozham, which has Prithviraj in the lead, has Neeraj in a full-length role. Neeraj also portrayed a pivotal role in Tom Emmatty's Oru Mexican Aparatha.

Neeraj debuted as a screenplay writer through the movie Lavakusha in 2017 in which he also played one of the title characters along with Aju Varghese.

In 2019, Neeraj starred as the main antagonist, Moosa Rehman in the Amazon Original web series titled The Family Man, helmed and produced by director duo Raj and DK. The series also stars Manoj Bajpayee, Priyamani and Kishore in major roles.

In July 2020, he released a rap song titled "Pani Paali". It depicted various aspects of life experienced by common people during the COVID-19 pandemic.The song went viral in a very short period of time and was a huge hit among Malayalees and also around other parts of the globe. It also introduced rap music to a more mainstream audience.

== Personal life ==
Neeraj is the son of Dr. K. Madhavan and Latha Madhavan. He married his long time girlfriend Deepthi, who is also a native of Kozhikode, on 2 April 2018. The couple have a daughter born in 2021.

== Filmography ==
Key
†	Denotes films that have not yet been released

- All films are in Malayalam language unless otherwise noted.

=== Films ===
Year	Title	Role	Notes
2013	Buddy	Govindh	
2013	Memories	Mechanic	
2013	Drishyam	Monichan	
2013	Oru Indian Pranayakadha	Charlie	
2014	1983	Prahladan	
2014	Apothecary	Shenoy	
2014	Sapthamashree Thaskaraha	Narayanankutti	
2014	Homely Meals	Arun	
2015	Mariyam Mukku	Dennis	
2015	Oru Vadakkan Selfie	Thankaprasad/Thankamma	
2015	Madhura Naranga	Kumar	
2015	KL.10 Pathu	Aftab/Appu	
2015	Just Married	Riyaz	
2015	Jamna Pyari	Tony Kurishinkal	
2015	Kunjiramayanam	Kanjuttan	
2015	Charlie	Ansari	
2015	Adi Kapyare Kootamani	Remo	
2016	Oozham	Ajmal	
2017	Oru Mexican Aparatha	Subhash	
2017	Lavakusha	Lavan	Also writer
2017	Paipin Chuvattile Pranayam	Govutty/Govindankutty	
2018	Rosapoo	Ambros	
2019	Allu Ramendran	Neeraj Madhav	Cameo
2020	Gauthamante Radham	Gauthaman	
2022	Sundari Gardens	Victor Paul	Sony Liv film
2022	Vendhu Thanindhathu Kaadu	Sridharan	Tamil film, also singer
2022	An Action Hero	Sai	Hindi film, cameo appearance
2023	Enkilum Chandrike	Auto Driver Abhishek	Cameo appearance in the Climax portion
2023	RDX	Xavier	
2024	Varshangalkku Shesham	Fearless Alex Matthew	
2026	Pluto	Vignesh	

=== Web series ===
Year	Title	Role	Language	Notes
2019	The Family Man: Season 1	Moosa Rehman	Hindi	Amazon Prime Video
2021	Feels Like Ishq	Rajeev	Hindi	Netflix
2024	Showtime	Satya Krishnan	Hindi	Disney+Hotstar
2025	Love Under Construction	Vinod	Malayalam	Disney+ Hotstar

== Other works ==
=== As choreographer ===
Year	Album	Song	Music director
2015	Oru Vadakkan Selfie	Enne Thallendammava	Shaan Rahman
2015	Adi Kapyare Kootamani	Ullasa Gayike	Shaan Rahman

== Discography ==
=== Film songs ===
Year	Title	Song	Composer	Co-Artist(s)	Notes	Ref.
2022	Vendhu Thanindhathu Kaadu	"Porattam"	A. R. Rahman		Also lyrics	
2023	RDX	"Scene Mone"	Rzee, Self		Also lyrics	
2026	Pluto	"Ponaal Pottum Poda"	Self			

=== Records ===
Year	Song	Co-Artist(s)	Label	Notes	Ref.
2020	"Panipaali"	Arcado	MAD.V Records		
2020	"Akkarappacha"	Young H	MAD.V Records		
2021	"First Love"	Siddharth Menon, Arcado	MAD.V Records		
2021	"Namma Stories"	Arivu, SIRI, Hanumankind, Kartik Shah	Netflix Music	Netflix Originals	
2021	"Panipaali-2"	Arcado	MAD.V Records		
2022	"Po"		MAD.V Records		
2022	"Arpo"	Hrishi	MAD.V Records		
2022	"Kattanchaya"		MAD.V Records		
2023	"I Am Back"	Rzee	MAD.V Records		
2023	"Kali Maari"	Rzee	MAD.V Records		
2024	"Dracula"	Rzee	MAD.V Records		
2024	"Chetharu"	Rzee	MAD.V Records		
2024	"Ballaatha Jaathi"	Rzee, Dabzee, Baby Jean	Universal Music		
2025	"Old School Lady"	Arcado	Saregama		
2025	"Garjanam"	Ribin Richard	MAD.V Records		
2025	"Pottatte Padakkam"	Arcado	MAD.V Records		
2026	"Entha Paadu"	Rzee	MAD.V Records		

=== EPs & LPs ===
Year	Play Title	Songs	Co-Artist(s)	Label	Notes	Ref.
2020	Jungle Speaks, Vol 1	"Padayappa & Supran"	Rzee	MAD.V Records	Debut EP	
2020	Jungle Speaks, Vol 1	"Bobby & Sulaiman"	Rzee	MAD.V Records	Debut EP	
2020	Jungle Speaks, Vol 1	"Chithragupthan"	Rzee	MAD.V Records	Debut EP	
2020	Wish	"Wish"	Pina Colada Blues, Dan Pearson	MAD.V Records		
2020	Wish	"Hope"	Pina Colada Blues, Dan Pearson	MAD.V Records		
2020	Wish	"Fly"	Pina Colada Blues, Dan Pearson	MAD.V Records		

== Awards and nominations ==
Asianet Film Awards

- 2018 – Won – Best Star Pair – Paippin Chuvattile Pranayam

Asiavision Awards

- 2015 – Won – New Sensation in Acting (Male) for performance in various movies

North American Film Awards

- 2016 – Special mention by the jury for performance in various movies
- 2017 – Special mention by the jury for performance in Paippin Chuvattile Pranayam
