= Karutha Sooryan =

- Film poster
- Directed by: E V M Ali
- Written by: E V M Ali
- Screenplay by: E V M Ali
- Produced by: E V M Ali; Dileep Kunnachi
- Starring: Muhammad Shah; Manjusha; Kalabhavan Abi; Neena Kurup; Kochupreman
- Cinematography: Santhosh Pathanamthitta
- Production company: Kingstar productions
- Release date: 2017
- Country: India
- Language: Malayalam

Karutha Sooryan (transl. Black sun) is a 2017 Indian Malayalam-language film produced by E. V. M. Ali and Dileep Kunnachi under the banner of The Kingstar productions. The film stars Muhammad Shah, Rishad, Residh Bose and Manjusha in the lead roles, alongside Kalabhavan Abi, Neena Kurup and Kochupreman. The film's story, screenplay and direction is done by E. V. M. Ali. It was the last film of Kalabhavan Abi, a mimicry artist who performed comical roles in old Malayalam films.

== Plot ==
A blind boy, Gopu, rejected by his father is looked after by his mother and is taught music by a local musician. He is in love with a girl living nearby and they spend their free time together. Later, being mocked by villagers for his deformity, he leaves the village leaving his love behind. There he is taken care of by a boy named Vishnu, who finds him on the roadside. Though Vishnu's parents were not that interested, they still accept Gopu. Vishnu and Gopu grow up together and become like family. Vishnu is a person who has the ability to foresee future events in his dreams as most of his dreams have come true. He foresees his death and makes arrangements to donate his eyes to Gopu. Vishnu had a quarrel with a colleague named Deenu in the college and Deenu has already fixed a quotation with a gang from Bombay to murder Vishnu. Later, Vishnu is killed by the gang in an accident. Gopu receives Vishnu's donated eyes. When Gopu learns about Vishnu's murderer, he and his friends try to murder him. Later, it is revealed that the real murderer of Deenu was Vishnu's father, Rajashekaran Thambi and he himself is the father of Gopu.

== Cast ==
- Kalabhavan Abi
- Shivaji Guruvayoor
- Neena Kurup
- Kochu Preman
- Muhammad Shah
- Rishad
- Residh Bose
- Kochupreman
- Manjusha
- Megha
- Priyanka Nayar
- Razaq Paradise
- Prashanth Isacc
- Narayan Payyannur
- Dileep Kozhikode
- Santra
- Ali Khan
- Ummar Khan
- Jibin Cacko
- Milan
- Deepu Ramasheri
- Swaminathan
- Prashanth Kottayam
- Master Niranjan
- Baby Leana
- Sainudeen
- Ansari
- Vasantharani

== Soundtrack ==
- "Mallikappoovinu"- Jaffer
- "Aanandamanu"- Vijay Yeshudas, Harsha
- "Koodozhinja paingili"- Vijay Yeshudas
- "Marakkuvanakilla"- Kannur Sherif
- "Nombarangal Kondu"- Vishnu Das
- "Pattu manam nonthu"- Kannur Sherif
- "Swarangalenn"- Vijay Yeshudas
