= Anarkali Marikar =

Indian film actress

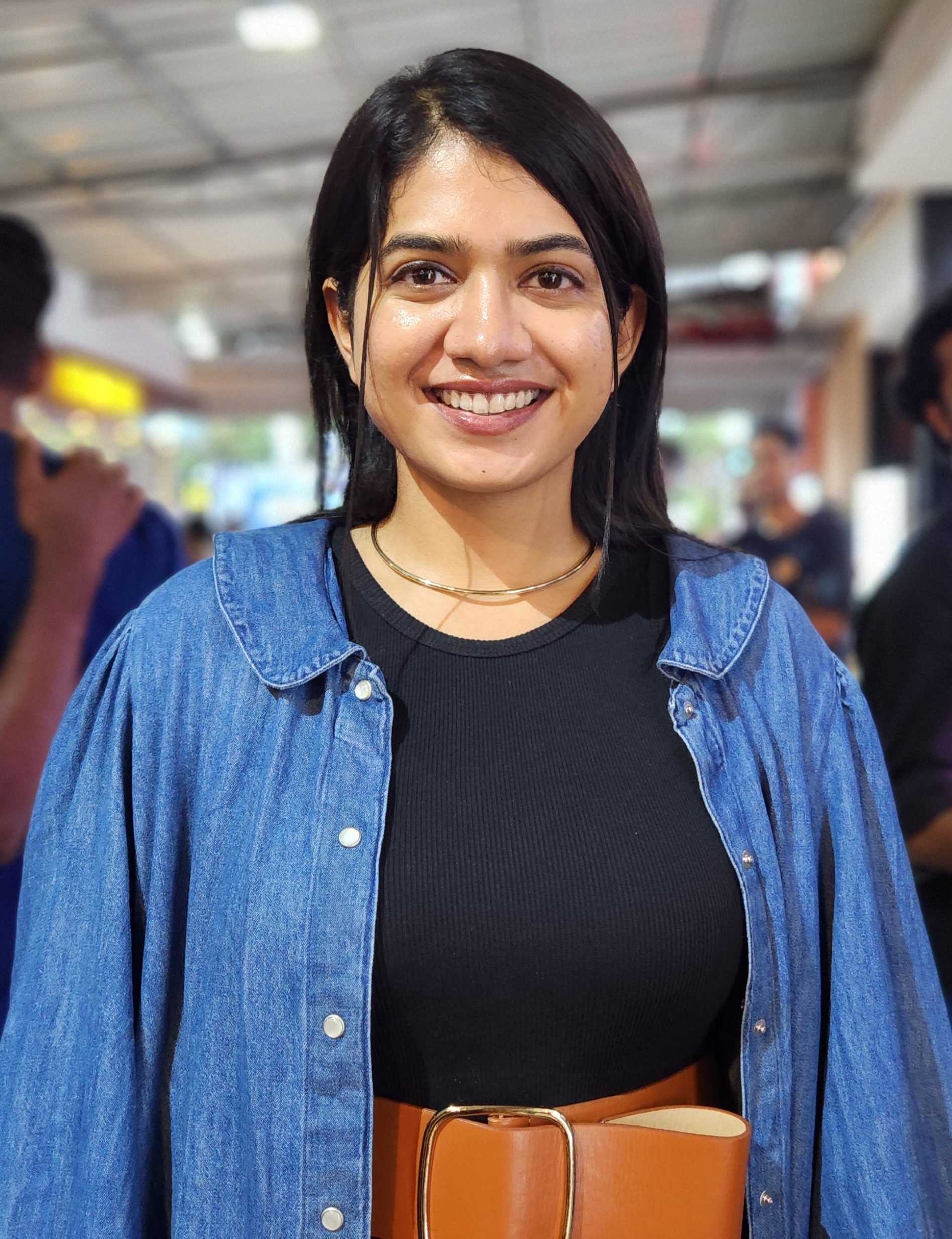
- Anarkali in June 2024
- Born: Kochi, Kerala, India
- Education: Mar Ivanios College, Thiruvananthapuram
- Occupation: Actress
- Years active: 2016–present
- Parents: Nias Marikar; Lali P. M.
- Relatives: Lakshmi Marikar (sister)

Anarkali Marikar is an Indian actress who appears predominantly in Malayalam films.

== Early life ==
Anarkali was born to Nias Marikar and Lali P. M. Her father is a photographer and mother is an actress. She has an elder sister named Lakshmi Marikar, who was a former child actor in the Malayalam film No. 1 Snehatheeram Bangalore North. Anarkali completed her degree in Mass communication from Mar Ivanios College in Thiruvananthapuram. She was offered the role in her debut film Aanandam through its cinematographer Anend C. Chandran, a friend to her sister.

== Career ==
Anarkali made her film debut in 2016 with the teenage romantic-comedy Aanandam, in a supporting role. Her second film Vimaanam (2017) featured Prithviraj Sukumaran in the lead role, and was directed by debutante Pradeep Nair. After that, she was cast in a leading role in Amala, directed by debutante Nishad Ebrahim.

In 2018, she played Devika opposite Asif Ali in Mandharam. In 2019, she appeared in debutante director Manu Ashokan's Uyare, along with Parvathy Thiruvothu, Tovino Thomas and Asif Ali. Manu, who had previously worked with Anarkali in Vimaanam as an associate director, cast her in the movie seeing her performance. Her role as Sariya D'Costa, a friend of protagonist Pallavi (Parvathy), was critically acclaimed. She has also done a guest role in Marconi Mathai directed by debutante Sanil Kalathil starring Jayaram and Vijay Sethupathi.

== Filmography ==
Key
†	Denotes films that have not yet been released

All films are in Malayalam language unless otherwise noted.

Year	Title	Role	Notes
2016	Aanandam	Darshana	
2017	Vimaanam	Gauri	
2018	Mandaram	Devika	
2019	Uyare	Sariya D'Costa	
2019	Maarconi Mathaai	Herself	Cameo appearance
2022	Priyan Ottathilanu	Jia	
2023	B 32 Muthal 44 Vare	Ziya	
2023	Sulaikha Manzil	Haala	
2023	Janaki Jaane	Maria	
2023	Amala	Sherin	
2023	Kirkkan	Rachel & Rebecca	
2024	Mandakini	Ambili	
2024	Gaganachari	Aliyaamma	
2024	Thrayam	Neena	
2024	Soul Stories	Vaishnavi	
2025	Innocent	Kavya Rajendran	
2026	Vishwanath & Sons	Dr. Meena	Tamil film
