= James Bond (1999 film) =

1999 film directed by Baiju Kottarakkara

- Directed by: Baiju Kottarakkara
- Written by: Noordheen (story); Kaloor Dennis (screenplay & dialogues)
- Based on: Baby's Day Out by John Hughes
- Produced by: Jose Puthusery
- Starring: Kalabhavan Mani; Prem kumar Bheeman Raghu; Indrans; Abi; Vani Viswanath; Janardhanan; Ratheesh
- Cinematography: J. Williams
- Edited by: K. Sankunni
- Music by: Berny-Ignatius
- Production company: A-One Films
- Release date: 1999
- Country: India
- Language: Malayalam

James Bond is a 1999 Indian Malayalam-language action comedy film directed by Baiju Kottarakkara and starring Kalabhavan Mani, Premkumar, Bheeman Raghu, Indrans, Abi, Vani Viswanath, Janardhanan and NL Balakrishnan. The film is a remake of the 1995 Telugu film Sisindri which itself was a remake of the 1994 American film Baby's Day Out. It was filmed mainly in New Delhi.

Despite the film's title, it is in no way related to the James Bond film series nor an adaptation of the novels by Ian Fleming.

== Premise ==
Following the bankruptcy of their local business, five friends go into hiding only to stumble upon a baby who changes their lives.

== Cast ==
- Kalabhavan Mani as Mathappan
- Premkumar as Unnithan
- Bheeman Raghu as Hajiyar
- Indrans as Shankarankutty
- Abi as Sundaran
- Janardhanan as Kunnamkulam Rappai
- Vani Viswanath as Dayana
- Ratheesh as Sunny, baby's Father
- Philomina as Aleyammachedathi
- T. S. Raju as Mathai
- Tony as Shiju, police officer
- Iqbal as the I.T guy
- NL Balakrishnan as Ayyappan
- Sidharaj as Raja, Kidnapper #1
- Baiju Ezhupunna as Charlie, kidnapper #2
- Juhi Chawla as the baby's Mother (photo presence)

== Soundtrack ==
The film's Music Director by Berni Ignatious. Lyrics by Gireesh Puthenchery.

== Additional information ==
Some of the challenging shots in action scenes by the late cinematographer J. Williams have received recognition.

James Bond (1999)

Soundtrack album by Berni Ignatious
- Released: 26 August 1999
- Genre: Film soundtrack
- Length: 13:30
- Language: Malayalam

No.	Title	Singer(s)	Length
1.	"Moovanthi"	KJ. Yesudas	05:10
2.	"Mizhiyoram"	KS. Chithra	04:31
3.	"Chakkinu Vechathu"	Biju Narayanan	03:48
Total length:			13:30
