= Mimics Action 500 =

- Directed by: Balu Kiriyath
- Written by: Harikumaran Thampi; Anzar Kalabhavan (dialogues)
- Screenplay by: Anzar Kalabhavan
- Produced by: Harikumaran Thampi
- Starring: Rajan P. Dev; KPAC Lalitha; A. C. Zainuddin; Abi
- Cinematography: M. D. Sukumaran
- Edited by: G. Murali
- Music by: S. P. Venkatesh
- Production company: Prabha Cine Arts
- Distributed by: Prabha Cine Arts
- Release date: 4 November 1995
- Country: India
- Language: Malayalam

Mimics Action 500 is a 1995 Indian Malayalam comedy film, directed by Balu Kiriyath and produced by Harikumaran Thampi. The film stars Rajan P. Dev, KPAC Lalitha, A. C. Zainuddin and Abi in the lead roles. The film's musical score was done by S. P. Venkatesh.

Mimics Super 1000, a sequel by Kiriyath, was released in 1996.

== Cast ==
- Rajan P. Dev as Manimala Mamachan
- KPAC Lalitha as Sharada Teacher
- A. C. Zainuddin as Johnykutty
- Abi as Devassykutty
- Kottayam Nazeer as Krishnankutty
- Kalabhavan Narayanankutty as Narayanankutty
- Nandu Pothuval as Sankarankutty
- Kalabhavan Navas as Babykutty
- Eloor George as Ramankutty
- Kalabhavan Santhosh as Pappankutty
- Sagar Shiyas as Jimmykutty
- Shaju K. S. as Kesavankutty
- Kalabhavan Haneef as Georgekutty
- Chippy as Sreedevi, Souparnika Thampuratti (dual role)
- Mala Aravindan as Kurup
- Narendra Prasad as Kulashekara Varma Valiyakoyi Thampuran
- Prathapachandran as A. V. Thampan
- Mahesh as Rajan Thampan, adopted son of A.V. Thampan and manager of Club 2000
- Baburaj
- Geetha Vijayan as Alice
- Manju Satheesh
- Sonia Baiju Kottarakkara
- Bindu Varappuzha as Sabeena
- Priyanka Anoop as Lalitha
- Kalabhavan Rahman
- Tini Tom as club 2000 performer
- Mafia Sasi as Gunda
- Ronald Poyya as Driver and Imitating Mohanlal

== Soundtrack ==
The music was composed by S. P. Venkatesh and the lyrics were written by Gireesh Puthenchery.

No.	Song	Singers	Lyrics	Length (m:ss)
1	"Chellappoo Chamayappoo"	Biju Narayanan, Chorus	Gireesh Puthenchery	
2	"Mamalakkaranam"	Biju Narayanan, Pradeep	Gireesh Puthenchery	
3	"Manimala Mettil"	K. S. Chithra, Biju Narayanan, Pradeep	Gireesh Puthenchery	
