= Appani Sarath =

Indian actor

- Born: Sarath Kumar; 28 December 1992 (age 33); Thiruvananthapuram, Kerala, India
- Occupations: Actor; dancer; producer; scriptwriter
- Years active: 2017–present
- Notable work: Angamaly Diaries; Auto Shankar

Sarath Kumar (born 15 April 1992), professionally known as Appani Sarath, is an Indian actor who works in Malayalam cinema. He rose to prominence for portraying Appani Ravi in Angamaly Diaries, directed by Lijo Jose Pellissery.

== Career ==
Sarath began acting as a child artist at the age of five, performing in professional theatre productions and festivals across Kerala. He was also associated with the Thiruvananthapuram Kalamandiram Nataka Sangham, and participated in mono acting, drama, music, and dance.

After completing his higher secondary education, he was active in Kerala's theatre scene, performing with organisations including Thiruvananthapuram Abhinaya and Kavalam Narayana Panicker's Sopanam. Following his graduation from Indira Gandhi National Open University, he worked as a mime and drama instructor in schools and colleges. He was also a founding member of the Thiruvananthapuram Comedians theatre troupe.

Sarath became known through his involvement in left-wing political and street theatre movements, including performances with the Kerala Sasthra Sahithya Parishad. One of his notable stage productions, Cyclist, was first performed at the Sree Sankaracharya University of Sanskrit and was subsequently staged at venues across Kerala. He later pursued a postgraduate degree in drama at the university, where he acted in and directed several plays.

During his postgraduate studies, he was selected through a campus audition for Angamaly Diaries, making his film debut as Appani Ravi, the role that brought him wider recognition. He subsequently appeared in Malayalam films including Velipadinte Pusthakam, Pokkiri Simon, and Sachin, as well as the Tamil films Chekka Chivantha Vaanam and Sandakozhi 2.

In addition to his film work, Sarath portrayed the serial killer Auto Shankar in the Auto Shankar web series on ZEE5, and played Kannan in the pan-Indian web series Sundari for HR OTT.

== Filmography ==
=== Film ===
Year	Title	Role	Language	Notes
2017	Angamaly Diaries	Appani Ravi	Malayalam	
2017	Velipadinte Pusthakam	Franklin	Malayalam	
2017	Pokkiri Simon	Love today Ganesh	Malayalam	
2017	Paipin Chuvattile Pranayam	Keedam	Malayalam	
2018	Chekka Chivantha Vaanam	Chinnappadasan's son-in-law	Tamil	
2018	Sandakozhi 2	Pechi's brother	Tamil	
2018	Contessa	Chandu	Malayalam	
2019	Sachin	Kudiyan Jose	Malayalam	
2019	Ikkayude Sakadam	Auto driver	Malayalam	
2020	Love FM	Ghazal	Malayalam	
2021	Malik	Shibu	Malayalam	
2021	Naan Mirugamaai Maara	Durai	Tamil	
2022	Kakkipada	Ameer	Malayalam	
2023	Lovefully Yours Veda	Kanimangalam Stephen	Malayalam	
2023	Thugs		Tamil	
2023	Amala	Basil	Malayalam	
2023	Kirkkan	Sharon	Malayalam	
2023	Regina	Rajesh	Tamil	
2023	Antony	Keecheri Simon	Malayalam	
2024	Swargathile Katturumbu		Malayalam	
2024	Alangu	Philip	Tamil	
2026	Ananthan Kaadu	Jackson	Malayalam; Tamil	Bilingual film
2026	Disco †	TBA	Malayalam	

=== Web series ===
Year	Title	Role	Language	Notes
2019	Auto Shankar	Auto Shankar	Tamil	ZEE5
2024	Pan Indian Sundari	Kannan	Malayalam	Highrich OTT

=== Television ===
Year	Title	Role	Language	Channel	Notes
2023	Mizhirandilum	Cameo as Himself	Malayalam	Zee Keralam	Soap opera
2025	Bigg Boss 7	Contestant	Malayalam	Asianet	Reality show; Evicted on Day 34

== Awards ==
Year	Award	Category	Film	Result
2017	South Indian International Movie Awards	Best actor in a Negative role - Malayalam	Angamaly Diaries	Won
2017	Vanitha Film Awards	Best Newcomer Actor	Velipadinte Pusthakam	Won
2017	Asianet Film Awards	Best New Face Male	Velipadinte Pusthakam	Won
2017	Asiavision Awards	New Sensation in acting	Velipadinte Pusthakam	Won
2017	Filmfare Awards South	Best Supporting Actor – Malayalam	Velipadinte Pusthakam	Nominated
