= High Range =

High Range may refer to:

- Dynamic range, the ratio between the largest and smallest measurable values of a specific quantity
- High Range, Kerala, a hilly tract in Kerala, India
- High Range, New South Wales, a locality in New South Wales, Australia
