= Kichamani MBA =

- Directed by: Samad Mankada
- Written by: Samad Mankada
- Produced by: Hill Top Salim
- Starring: Suresh Gopi; Navya Nair; Biju Menon; Jayasurya; Cochin Haneefa; Kalabhavan Abi; Salim Kumar
- Cinematography: P.Sukumar
- Edited by: Hariharaputhran KP
- Music by: Alex Paul
- Production company: Adarsh Release
- Distributed by: Adarsh Release
- Release date: 31 August 2007
- Country: India
- Language: Malayalam

Kichamani MBA is a 2007 Indian Malayalam language action comedy film directed by Samad Mankada (in his directorial debut). Starring Suresh Gopi,Navya Nair, Biju Menon and Jayasurya in lead roles, produced by Hill Top Productions. It also has Cochin Haneefa, Salim Kumar, Kalabhavan Abi and Bijukuttan in supporting roles. This film was a Box office flop.

== Plot ==
Kichamani a smooth talking wheeler-dealer who runs a big establishment specialized in bribing officials and making things done from government machinery. The MBA attached to his name is not the short form for the degree, but it stands for Member of Bachelor Association, as the hero is more a devotee of lord Ayappa. He has his parallel mechanisms in every government offices and with the passes issued by Kichamani, any one can get any deed done, ranging from getting job transfers, smuggling goods including liquor to booking a seat in private medical colleges.

Kichamani has his own reasons to think that the remedy for corruption is not anti corruption, but corruption itself. He believes in his experiences that he got since his childhood working with the bribery machinery in various offices. His immediate core group includes Ginnah, Bahuleyan, Udhayabhanu & Gopi. Devanarayanan, popularly called as Devanji, a shrewd politician, who treats politics as a part of his illegal business. Devanarayanan is hell bent on clearing of the machinery of Kichamani for a variety of reasons as Kichamani extends unlimited support to Bahuleyan, his opponent in the party and as Kichamani is the one solely responsible for sending Devan's brother to jail.

Into this turmoil arrives Shivani Menon, an award-winning documentary maker from Delhi, with her crew composing of manager Chempakaraman and cameraman Sajan. As they are soon embroiled in probing on the illegal land acquisition by paradise group headed by Devanji, and plan to make a documentary on that, they fall into danger. Kichamani saves them and give them a shelter in his house. The essential love angle in the film is created by Sajan and Kichamani's sister Kalyani. The film progresses in the unending fights between Kichamani and Devanarayanan who strives for more power. The villain gathers every point to fight with Kichamani, which proves to be singular plot of the film.

== Cast ==
- Suresh Gopi as Kichamani
- Navya Nair as Shivani Menon
- Biju Menon as Devanarayanan aka Devanji, The main antagonist
- Jayasurya as Sajan
- Cochin Haneefa as Jinnah Bhai
- Priyanka Nair as Kalyani alias Chattambi, Kichamani's younger sister
- Bijukuttan as Udhayabhanu
- Kalabhavan Abi as Gopi
- Rizabawa as Finance & Excise Minister Bahuleyan, Kichamani's childhood friend
- Salim Kumar as Kasim, Devanarayanan's right hand
- Anil Murali as CI Thomas Kurishinkal
- Rajan P. Dev as DIG Somashekaran IPS
- Jaffar Idukki as Tharakan Pambadi, Devanarayanan's left hand
- Indrans as Sadasivan
- Chali Pala as Chandrapalli Chakrapaani
- Augustine as Chandy
- Bindu Panicker as Thressiya, Chandy's wife
- Kiran Raj as Mahindran, Devanarayanan's Younger brother
- Mafia Sasi as Usman Kareem
- Sudheer Karamana as Thampi
- Nisha Sarang as Traffic SI Seethalakshmi (cameo)

== Soundtrack ==
Music is composed by Alex Paul

- Pokkiriyane - Pradeep Palluruthy
