= Auto Shankar (TV series) =

Indian crime thriller television series

- Genre: Crime thriller
- Written by: Mani G
- Directed by: Ranga Yali
- Starring: Appani Sarath; Swayam; Arjun Chidambaram
- Composer: Arrol Corelli
- Country of origin: India
- Original language: Tamil
- No. of seasons: 1
- No. of episodes: 10 (list of episodes)

Production
- Producers: R. Ravindran; Manoj Paramahamsa
- Production location: India
- Cinematography: S. Manikandan
- Editor: Nikhil Sreekumar
- Running time: 30 mins (approx.)
- Production company: JAR Pictures

Original release
- Network: ZEE5
- Release: 23 April 2019

Auto Shankar is an Indian crime thriller streaming television series released on ZEE5, in the setting of Madras from 1985 to 1995. The story revolves around an auto driver whose life changes when he gets involved in the local transportation of liquor and prostitution. The series stars Appani Sarath as the real-life eponymous criminal.

== Premise ==
The series focuses on a gangster nicknamed "Auto Shankar". He slowly becomes more involved in his illegal trade, and spirals out of control, becoming connected to various businessmen and politicians. He is called a serial killer by police. The show ends with him being charged with the death penalty.

== Cast ==
- Appani Sarath as Gowri Shankar / Auto Shankar
- Vasudha as Lalitha
- Saranya Ravi as Sumathi
- Selvapandian as Mohan
- Swayam Siddha as Chandrika
- Arjun Chidambaram as Kathiravan
- Rajesh Dev as Babu

== Episodes ==
No. overall	No. in season	Title	Directed by	Written by	Original release date
1	1	"The Awakening"	Ranga Yali	Mani G	23 April 2019
The episode starts in Salem, as Auto Shankar is on death row even though previous times his execution date had been postponed. Shankar is waiting for a call to stop his penalty, but no such call comes through, leaving him hanging. He starts by transporting liquor which gives him a nickname. He also falls in love with a cabaret dancer by helping her when one of the drunkards misuse her.
2	2	"The Power Game"	Ranga Yali	Mani G	23 April 2019
Shankar is having an affair with Chandrika. With her help in smuggling liquor, he gets a good name but it damages Ramajayam who is the CEO of a liquor business. Rajaram is engaged to the daughter of an MLA. In a meeting, he talks arrogantly to a minister, as his connection to MLA gives him status. Minister doesn't take it well and Ramajayam also stops paying his monthly bribe to the police for letting them do his business. Shankar comes inside the photoshoot over the business and takes over the business from a local pimp Reddy. Shankar starts to grow his liquor business in new ways with the help of political power.
3	3	"The Rise of the Demon"	Ranga Yali	Mani G	23 April 2019
Reddy complains to the commissioner that the brothel has become lucrative in their area, and they have to take action. This creates problems for the police officers who supported Shankar. Shankar kills Reddy and makes it look like a suicide. Because Shankar is in an affair with Chandrika, his wife leaves him with their daughter. Shankar feels no regret, and his business is at its peak. He also becomes a pimp.
4	4	"The Wolf Hunter"	Ranga Yali	Mani G	23 April 2019
Sudalai, one of Shankar's accomplices, shows the photo of Chandrika to the minister and asks for Chandrika for the night. Shankar, who has a soft spot for her, doesn't deny her request but doesn't allow it either. The minister Sudalai tries to curb his business, causing Shankar to leave Chandrika. Sudalai is burnt by Shankar when he finds that he is the reason for it.
5	5	"The Seed of Chaos"	Ranga Yali	Mani G	23 April 2019
Three men of Ramajayam go to the lodge and steal money. Business is back for Shankar as the minister was happy with Chandrika. Ganja is added to his product sale. One of the men is killed by the Shankar's minions and set on fire in his house.
6	6	"The Balancing"	Ranga Yali	Mani G	23 April 2019
It's Shankar's birthday. It is seen that in that past, one of the police and Shankar had an earlier encounter. It was a time when Shankar was only a regular auto driver. His child was hungry in the night and started crying. Shankar goes to a shop to get milk, but he doesn't have money and steals some milk. The officer who saw this beats him and leaves. Shankar shows his anger to the shopkeeper. The SI thinks he can be better as a drug dealer than an auto driver. At the birthday celebration, the SI from back then comes and says his wish for Chandrika. Shankar hits him and asks him to go.
7	7	"Clean State"	Ranga Yali	Mani G	23 April 2019
Shankar gets involved in a business for a political person to get an actor to her bed. The actress says she is not interested in this as he is old and has a body rash. Shankar accepts her deal in exchange for getting hands-on with her. One of the girls working for Shankar says she wants to get off work and start a better life. Shankar finds she is in love with a guy working for him. Shankar kills both of them and also kills the two men who came and got all the cash from the lodge
8	8	"Fall of the Demon"	Ranga Yali	Mani G	23 April 2019
The SI asks one of the men working for Shankar to become approved. Police search for the bodies that were buried in his house. Shankar's empire crumbles in one day with no one to save him. He gives money to Chandrika and asks her to leave, as she will be helpful after he gets arrested. Shankar goes to meet his ex-wife, but she throws him out. Shankar is arrested right there. Chandrika abandons Shankar, and he goes to prison.
9	9	"The Rebirth"	Ranga Yali	Mani G	23 April 2019
Shankar is stuck in prison, and bail is not an option for him. A glimpse of his childhood is shown where his mother runs away from his drug addicted father. His father also estranged him. With the help of the jailer, he tries to escape the prison. The jailer is bribed with money and sex. Shankar escapes by creating a diversion with three other prisoners and staging a fake escape.
10	10	"The Conclusion"	Ranga Yali	Mani G	23 April 2019
Police search for Shankar. He goes to see his father. Shankar gets caught by the police due to his carelessness, and the police bring him back. He is transferred to the prison in Salem and his death penalty is confirmed, with the president rejecting his request for mercy. In his last minutes, he spends time with his wife.

== Reception ==
A critic from The News Minute wrote that "With better writing, Auto Shankar could have truly been a mature series. As it stands, it's a good addition to adult Tamil web series content but falls short of hitting the mark".
