= Shivani Bhai =

Indian actress, model, and host

- Born: Trivandrum, Kerala, India
- Occupations: Actress, model, television presenter
- Years active: 2008–present

Shivani Bhai is an Indian actress, model, and host who has appeared in predominantly Malayalam films apart from a Tamil film.

== Career ==
Shivani made her debut in Malayalam with Mammooty as his sister in Annan Thampi. She acted as heroine in her third Malayalam movie, Rahasya Police, with Jayaram in 2009. Her second movie was Bullet with Suresh Gopi.

She acted in the Tamil film Naanga and was recognised for the folk song "Adiye Potta Pulla".

== Filmography ==
- Note: all films are in Malayalam, unless otherwise noted.

Year	Film	Role	Notes
1997	Guru		Child artist
2008	Annan Thambi	Ammu	
2008	Bullet	Varsha	
2009	Rahasya Police	Manikutty	
2010	Swapnamalika		Uncredited
2011	China Town	Honey	
2011	Yakshiyum Njanum	Ashwathy	
2012	Naanga	Revathi	Tamil film
2017	Ennum		
2017	Mythili Veendum Varunnu	Mythili	
2017	Nilavariyathe	Shivani	
2018	Issacinte kadhakal	Shahina	
2023	Orapaara Kalyanam		
2024	DNA	Revathi	
