= Kalabhavan Abi =

Indian comedian and actor (1965-2017)

Abi
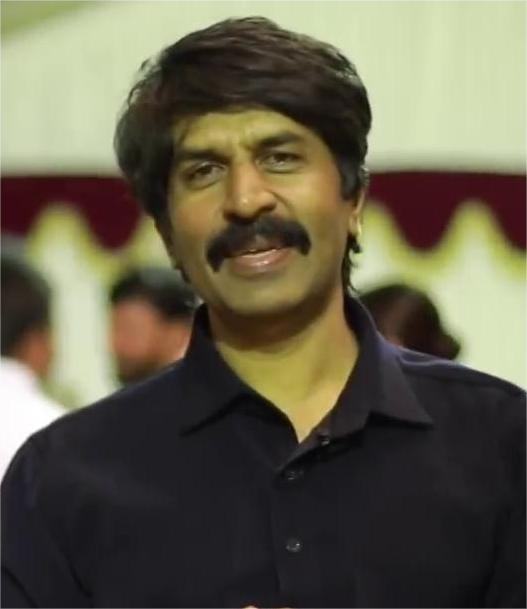
- Born: Habeeb Muhammed; 28 February 1965; Muvattupuzha, Kerala, India
- Died: 30 November 2017 (aged 52); Elamakkara, Kochi
- Education: Maharaja's College, Ernakulam
- Occupations: Impressionist; comedian; actor; dubbing artist; playback singer
- Years active: 1991–2017
- Spouse: Sunila
- Children: 3 (including Shane Nigam)

Habeeb Muhammed (28 February 1965 – 30 November 2017), better known by his stage name Kalabhavan Abi, was an Indian impressionist, comedian, actor, and dubbing artist.

== Personal life ==
Kalabhavan Abi was born on 28 February 1965 in Muvattupuzha, Ernakulam. He graduated from Maharaja's College, Ernakulam. Abi was married to Sunila, and had three children, including actor Shane Nigam.

== Death ==
On 30 November 2017, Abi was admitted to hospital after complaining of uneasiness and died half an hour later. His funeral took place at Muvattupuzha Muslim Jamath Mosque. Prior to his death, Abi was under treatment for Aplastic Anemia.

== Career ==
Abi participated in Youth Festivals at the Mahatma Gandhi University and won several awards at mimicry competitions before joining the mimicry troupe Kalabhavan. He debuted in 1991 with the film Nayam Vyakthamakkunnu. In addition to acting, Abi has dubbed for actors such as Amitabh Bachchan in various Malayalam dubbed adverts.

== Filmography ==
=== As actor ===
- All films are in Malayalam language unless otherwise noted.

Year	Title	Role
1991	Nayam Vyakthamakkunnu	Stephen
1992	Kasarkode Khaderbai	Sakaria
1992	Ellarum Chollanu	
1993	Vatsalyam	Vinod
1994	Bheeshmacharya	
1994	Sainyam	Cadet Das
1994	Vardhakya Puranam	Santhosh
1995	Mimics Action 500	Devassykutty
1995	Mazhavilkoodaram	
1995	Kidilol Kidilam	
1996	The Porter (1996 film)	Sasi (Hero role)
1996	Kireedamillatha Rajakkanmar	
1997	Manikya Koodaram	
1997	Aniyathipraavu	
1997	Guru Sishyan	
1999	James Bond	
2000	Puli Pidicha Pulival	
2002	Desam	
2004	Rasikan	
2007	Kichamani MBA	
2010	Thanthonni	
2013	Thank You	
2013	My Fan Ramu	Raghu
2013	For Sale	
2013	Malayala Nadu	
2014	Koothara	Thufail Ikka
2015	Compartment	
2016	Happy Wedding	
2017	Chicken Kokkachi	
2017	Njan Aara Mon	
2017	Thrissivaperoor Kliptham	Sensilavos Pauly
2017	Karutha Sooryan	

=== As playback singer ===
Year	Film	Song	Music director	Co-singer
2014	Salalah Mobiles	La La Lasa	Gopi Sundar	Nazriya Nazim, Gopi Sundar

=== As dubbing artist ===
Year	Film	Actor
2015	Kshatriya Vamsam	Venkatesh
