= Neena Kurup =

Indian actress

- Kurup in 2026
- Born: Kozhikode, Kerala, India
- Occupations: Actor; dancer; presenter
- Years active: 1987–present

Neena Kurup is an Indian actress who appears in Malayalam films and television series in supporting roles to character roles.

== Filmography ==
List of Neena Kurup film credits
Year	Title	Role	Notes
1986	Gandhinagar 2nd Street	Student	Cameo in song
1987	Sreedharante Onnam Thirumurivu	Aswathy	Debut
1993	Naarayam	Hazeez's wife, Hajiyar's daughter	
1993	City Police	Handicapped & kidnapped lady	
1993	Porutham	Hema	
1994	Njan Kodiswaran	Indu	
1994	Sraadham		
1994	Snehadooth		
1998	Punjabi House	Karishma	
1998	Sagaracharitham	Sreedevi	
2004	Rasikan	Shailaja	
2005	Lokanathan IAS	Collector	
2005	Pandippada	Suma	
2007	Kaiyoppu	Lalitha	
2011	Pusthakam	Mallika	
2011	Violin	Rose	
2011	Steps	-	
2012	Thalsamayam Oru Penkutty	Priya	
2013	Ente/Naa Bangaaru Talli	Durga's mother	Malayalam-Telugu Bilingual film
2013	Bangles	Adv.Supriya	
2014	Vellivelichathil	Annie	
2014	Villali Veeran	Rukmini	
2014	Ring Master	Mini	
2014	Koothara	Ammini	
2014	Endrum Ilamai	-	Tamil film
2015	One Second Please	-	
2015	Tharakangale Saakshi	Sulu	
2015	KL 10 Patthu	Raseena Abdullah	
2015	Kanthari	Doctor	
2015	Namasthe Bali	Gracy Anto	
2016	Ore Mukham	Rema	
2016	Kattappanayile Rithwik Roshan	Neethu's mother	
2016	Girls/ Thiraikku Varadha Kathai	Psychologist	Malayalam-Tamil bilingual film
2016	Chinna Dada	Vanaja	
2016	Mudhugauv	Lakshmi	
2016	Ithu Thaanda Police	CPO Elsamma	
2016	Pachakkallam	Aunty	
2016	Chennai Koottam	Maami	Malayalam-Tamil bilingual film
2016	168 Hours	Sherly	
2016	Sughamaayirikkatte	-	
2017	Karutha Sooryan	Saudamini	
2017	Lava Kusha	Nancy	
2017	Solo	Victim' wife	(Segment:World of Siva); Malayalam -Tamil bilingual film
2017	Aakashathinum Bhoomikkumidayil	Kamala	
2017	Bobby	Ajay's mother	
2017	Vilakkumaram	Kalyaniyamma	
2017	Kuppivala	Jaya Sethu	
2017	Hello Dubaikkaran	Sreedevi	
2017	Devayanam	Kausalya	
2018	Theevandi	Devi's mother, Shailaja	
2018	BTech	Smitha Subramaniam	
2018	Hey Jude	Maria Dominic	
2018	Street Lights	Mariyamma	Malayalam-Tamil Bilingual film
2018	Snehakoodu	Sneha's mother	
2018	Mutalaq	Swamini	
2018	Jungle.com	Maya teacher	
2018	Theekuchiyum Panithulliyum	Mary	
2018	Thobama	Sindhu	
2018	Lolans	Teacher Parvathi	
2018	Nimisham	-	
2018	Yours Lovingly	-	
2018	Velakkari Aayirunnalum Nee Enn Mohanavalli	-	
2018	Angane Njanum Premichu	-	
2018	Dust Bin		
2019	Oru Nalla Kottayamkkaran	Eliyamma	
2019	Red Signal	Herself	
2019	Manoharam	Sumathi	
2019	Poovalliyum Kunjadum	Indira	
2019	Ambili	Luci Kuriachan	
2019	Ormayil Oru Shishiram	Jalaja	
2019	Appuvinte Sathyanweshanam	Lakshmi	
2019	Mafi Dona	Gheetha	
2019	Luca	Adv. Amala	
2019	Allu Ramendran	Amruthesh's mother	
2019	Bolivia	Jessy	
2019	Mera Pyari Deshwasyom	Kalyani	
2019	Kosrakkollikal	Anwar's mother	
2019	Theerumanam	Muthulakshmi	
2019	Elakal Pacha Pookkal Manja	Teacher	
2019	Gramavasees		
2019	Vishudha Pusthakam		
2020	Love FM	Raziya	
2020	Sameer	Nasi's mother	
2020	Vahni	Adv. Asha Menon	
2020	Paapam Cheyyathavar Kalleriyatte	Jancy	
2021	Cabin	Sharatha	
2021	Kanakam Moolam	Asst. Commissioner of Police	
2021	Pranayamrutham	Kousalya	
2021	Ole Kanda Naal	Suhara	
2021	Confessions of a Cuckoo	Nidhi	
2022	Thallumaala	Wazim's mother	
2022	Last 6 Hours	Mother	Malayalam – Tamil bilingual film
2022	Autorickshawkarante Bharya	Radhika's mother	
2022	5il Oral Thaskaran	Janaki	
2022	God Bless You	Clara's mom	
2022	Anandakalyanam	Aashique's umma	
2022	Alli	Sumathiyamma	
2022	Prathi Niraparathiyano	Rohini teacher	
2022	Kochaal	Gracy	
2022	Pothumthala	-	
2022	Mahi	Bhanumathi	
2022	Swami Saranam	-	
2022	Porkalam	-	
2023	Christy	Elizabeth	
2023	Dear Vaappi	Ramla	
2023	Khali Purse of Billionaires	Nidhi's mother	
2023	Aalankam	-	
2023	Within Seconds		
2023	Madhura Manohara Moham	Suseela	
2023	Pendulum	Dr. Shabnam	
2023	Ottamaram	Bharathi	
2023	Mr. Hacker		
2023	Voice of Sathyanathan	Susan's mother	
2023	Queen Elizabeth	Salomi	
2024	Vivekanandan Viralanu	Diana's mother	
2024	Peppatty		
2025	Written & Directed by God	Mary	
2026	Spa	Catherine Pereira	
2026	Udumbanchola Vision		

== Television ==
Serials

Neena has acted in nearly 75 serials. Some are mentioned below.
Year	Title	Channel	Role	Notes
1994	Kanakachilanga			
1995	Michaelinte Sandhathikal	Lekha		
1996	Gopika			
1996	Manasi			
1997	Soumini			
1997	Periyattin Theerathu			
1997	Eka Tharakam			
1997	Paying Guest	Asianet		
1997	Ladies Hostel	DD Malayalam		
1998	Dhambathyam	DD Malayalam		
1998	Manjukaalam Mohicha Penkutty	DD Malayalam		
1999	Koomankolli	DD Malayalam		
2000	Pravesham	DD Malayalam		
2004	Meghasangeetham	DD Malayalam		
2004	Culcutta Hospital	Surya TV		Comeback series
2007	Nandanam	Surya TV		
2010	Ponnum Poovum	Amrita TV		
2010–2011	Chakravakam	Surya TV		
2011–2012	John De Panic	Mazhavil Manorama		
2012	Sreekrishnan	Surya TV	Rohini	
2012	Aayirathil Oruval	Mazhavil Manorama		
2013	Hridhayam Saakshi	Mazhavil Manorama	Seema	
2013	Nilapakshi	Kairali TV	Saradha	
2013	Innale	Surya TV		
2013	Pathinu Pathu	Surya TV		
2014	Aathira	Sun TV	Suseela	Tamil serial
2015	Indu Lekha	Media One		
2016	Jagratha	Amrita TV		
2017	Guru	Jaihind TV		
2018	Bhagyajathakam	Mazhavil Manorama	Vasanthi	
2018	Gowri	Surya TV		
2019–2020	Chackoyum Maryyum	Mazhavil Manorama	Alice	
2021–2022	Manassinakkare	Surya TV	Swamini	
2021–2024	Kaliveedu	Surya TV	Arunima	
2023	Kudumbavilakku	Asianet	Kanaka	Cameo
2023–present	Patharamattu	Asianet	Kanaka Durga	
?	Ushasandhya			
?	Samaksham			
?	Karppooram			
?	Midukki			

Telefilms

- Parppidam as Lathika
- Nanma Niranja Umma
- Kaathirikkathe
- Manushyaputhri
- Dany's as Ancy

Reality Shows

- Tharasangamam (Asianet)
- Malayalee House (Surya TV) – fourth runner up

TV Shows as a presenter

- Merchants of India (Surya TV)
- Dubai Shopping Festival
- Vaalkannadi
- Tang 'Quiz the Whiz'
- Philips Top Ten
- Paattupetti
- Wedding Bells
- May Flower
- Huggies Baby Contest (judge)

Commercials

- Geebon
- Emmanuval Silks
- Big Bazar
- Manu Granite Gallery
- CDC Cashew
- Kerala Times
- Ano Washing Powder
- Mazhavil FM
- Vanitha
- D Tabata
- Kanyaka
- Silk Yarns
- Robinfood
- Zomato Max Safety
- KCBC Matrimony
- Hyundai
- TGM Jewels
- Oppo
- Jet On Travels

== Other works ==
=== Short films ===
List of Neena Kurup short film credits
Year	Film	Role
2000	Ammayariyathe	Bindhu
2007	Minnaminnikal	Teacher
2014	Heads Or Tails	Mary
2015	The Beggar	Mrs.Nambiar
2016	Bahubali Kudikkarilla	Mary
2017	Tag	Sera's mother
2017	Bhakthi	Amritha's Amma
2019	Barbie	Shobha
2019	Best Actor	Mother
2019	Therali	Gladis
2020	Messenger	Mary
2020	Maattam	Mrs. Williams
2020	Nyayapramanam	Jessy
2020	Vinnil Ninnoru Thaaram	Zahi's mother
2020	Ammaye Orkkan	
2021	Women's Day	Sumithra
2021	Luyi	Maria
2022	Kalyanaprayam Aayille	Clara
2022	The Epitaph	Hajara
2022	Njan Ponmutta Idunna Poovan Kozhi (Webseries)	Unni's mother
2022	Shiva	Shiva's mother
2022	Ilanjippoo (Musical album)	Mother
2023	NO – Never Opt	Neena teacher
2023	Ente Makal	Dr. Meenakshi
	Shiva 2	
	Achayathi	

=== Play ===
- Swantham Lekhakan
