= Aakashathinum Bhoomikkumidayil =

- Theatrical release poster
- Directed by: Sandeep Ajith Kumar
- Screenplay by: Peethambaran
- Produced by: Remember Cinemas; NIROUP GUPTA; NNG Films
- Starring: Neena Kurup; Muhammad Musthafa; Shanavas Shanu
- Cinematography: Nahiyan
- Edited by: Febin Sidarth
- Music by: Gafoor M Khayam
- Production company: Flying Lantern Entertainment Pvt Ltd
- Release date: 2016
- Country: India
- Language: Malayalam

Aakashathinum Bhoomikkumidayil is a 2016 Indian Malayalam-language film directed by debutant Sandeep Ajith Kumar and scripted by "Peethambaran". The film features Neena Kurup, Musthafa and Shanavas (Rudran) in the lead roles.

== Plot ==
The movie revolves around a village in northern Kerala where political murders are common. In such one incident, a man is murdered after being mistaken for someone else. The families of both men are left stranded and the film narrates the incidents that happen to their children.

== Cast ==
- Neena Kurup (as Kamala)
- Muhammad Musthafa
- Shanavas Shanu (as Rudran)
- Dinesh Eranjikkal
- Vinod Kozhikode
- Kozhikode Sarada
- Master Mohsen Salam
- Master Udith Nived
- Sini Sinu
- Prasida Vasu

== Production ==
The movie was the debut of director Sandeep Ajith Kumar who was earlier known for directing short films Marupadi and Oral.

The first look poster was released on 7 September 2015.

== Music ==
Aakashathinum Bhoomikkumidayil

Soundtrack album to Aakashathinum Bhoomikkumidayil by Gafoor M Khayam
- Genre: Film soundtrack
- Length: 8:59
- Language: Malayalam
- Producer: Gafoor M Khayam

The film's songs are composed by Gafoor M Khayam and lyrics written by Janardhanan Cheekilode.

| No. | Title | Lyrics | Singer(s) | Length |
|---|---|---|---|---|
| 1. | "Kaatte Kaatte" | Janardhanan Cheekilode | KK Nishad | 4:27 |
| 2. | "Ithuvazhi Oro Raavum" | Janardhanan Cheekilode | Unni Menon | 4:32 |
