= Parvathy Thiruvothu filmography =

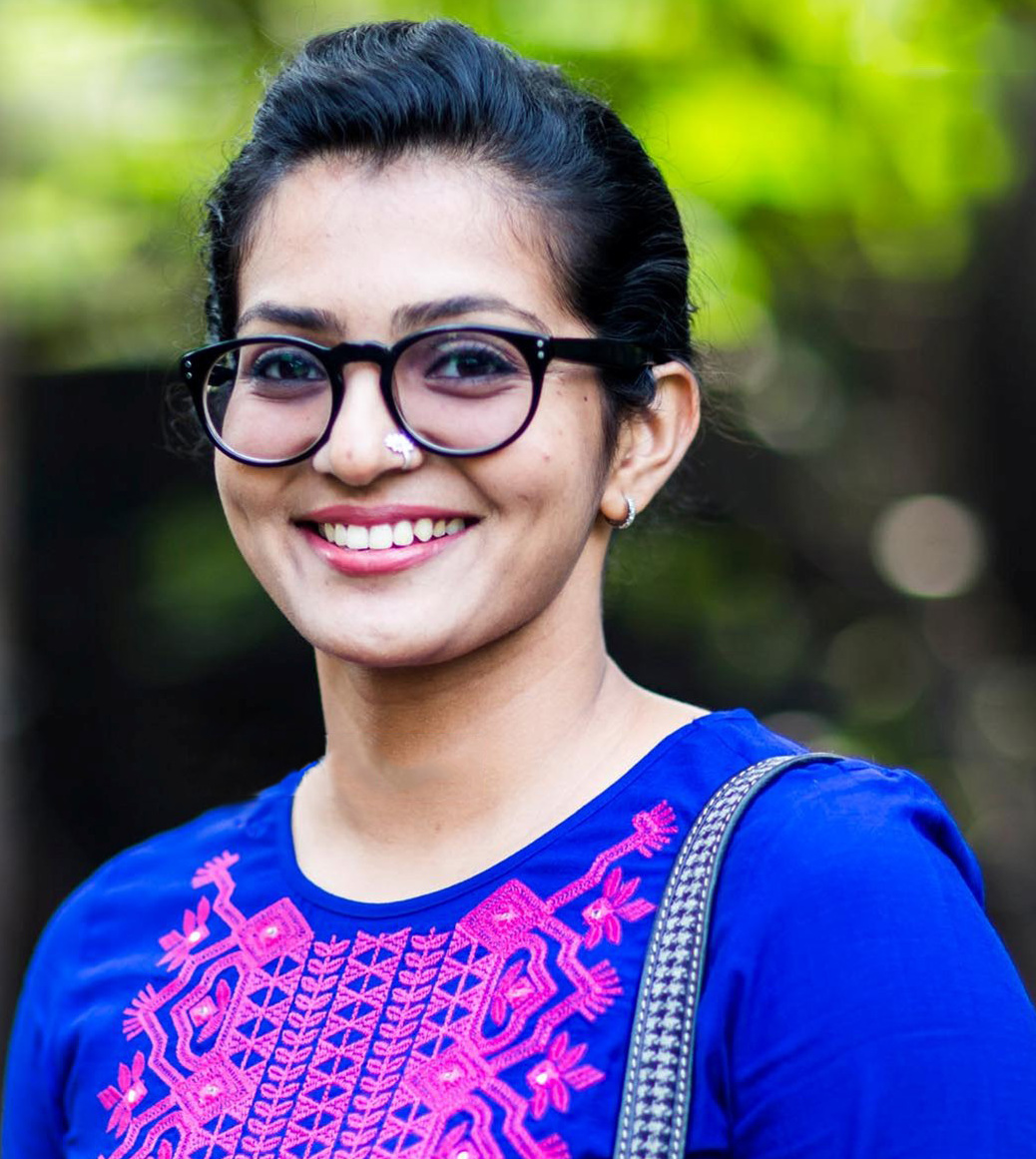
Parvathy in 2016

Parvathy Thiruvothu known mononymously as Parvathy, is an Indian actress who primarily works in Malayalam and Tamil films. She made her acting debut with the Malayalam film Out of Syllabus (2006), followed by appearances in Notebook (2006) and Vinodayathra (2007). She gained critical recognition for her performance as Maari in the Tamil romantic drama Poo (2008), for which she received the Filmfare Award for Best Actress – Tamil. She subsequently appeared in films across several South Indian languages, including the Kannada films Milana (2007) and Prithvi (2010), and the Tamil films Maryan (2013) and Uttama Villain (2015).

Parvathy rose to eminence with her roles in the Malayalam films Bangalore Days (2014), Ennu Ninte Moideen (2015) and Charlie (2015). Her portrayal of Kanchanamala in former and Tessa in latter earned her critical acclaim, with the latter winning her the Kerala State Film Award for Best Actress. She gained further recognition for portraying a nurse stranded in war-torn Iraq in the survival-drama Take Off (2017), earning a National Film Award – Special Mention, the Kerala State Film Award for Best Actress and the Best Actress award at the International Film Festival of India. Parvathy made her debut in Hindi cinema in the romantic comedy film Qarib Qarib Singlle (2017) opposite Irrfan Khan. She subsequently starred in Uyare (2019), Virus (2019), Koode (2018) and Puzhu (2022). In 2024, Parvathy appeared in films including Ullozhukku (2024) and Thangalaan (2024). Thiruvothu has won the Best Actress Award for her role in Ullozhukku at the IFFM. In 2026, Thiruvothu appeared in heist action thriller, I, Nobody and crime drama Pradhama Drishtiya Kuttakkar. The former was a box-office flop, while the latter was a box-office success earning over ₹50 crore (US$5.3 million) worldwide within 15 days of its release.

In addition to mainstream films, Parvathy has appeared in anthology films and digital productions. Her television and web streaming appearances include the Tamil anthology series Navarasa (2021), the Telugu thriller series Dhootha (2023) and the Malayalam anthology series Manorathangal (2024). In 2021, Thiruvothu featured in the anthology films including, Aanum Pennum (2021) and Sivaranjiniyum Innum Sila Pengalum (2021), as well as the English film Wonder Women (2022).

== Films ==
Key
†	Denotes films that have not yet been released

List of Parvathy Thiruvothu film credits
Year	Title	Role	Language	Notes (Note: All the awards mentioned are the ones that Parvathy has won)	Ref.
2006	Out of Syllabus	Gayatri	Malayalam		
2006	Notebook	Pooja Krishnan	Malayalam		
2007	Vinodayathra	Reshmi	Malayalam		
2007	Milana	Anjali	Kannada		
2007	Flash	Dhwani Sekharan	Malayalam		
2008	Poo	Maari	Tamil	Filmfare Award for Best Actress – Tamil; Vijay Award for Best Debut Actress	
2009	Male Barali Manju Irali	Sneha Shivappa	Kannada		
2010	Prithvi	Priya Shastri	Kannada		
2011	City of God	Marakatham	Malayalam		
2013	Chennaiyil Oru Naal	Aditi	Tamil		
2013	Andhar Bahar	Suhasini	Kannada		
2013	Maryan	Panimalar	Tamil		
2014	Bangalore Days	RJ Sarah	Malayalam	Filmfare Award for Best Supporting Actress – Malayalam	
2015	Uttama Villain	Manonmani / Yamini (Portrait)	Tamil		
2015	Ennu Ninte Moideen	Kottatil Kanchanamaala	Malayalam	Filmfare Award for Best Actress – Malayalam; IIFA Utsavam Award for Best Actress – Malayalam; Kerala State Film Award for Best Actress	
2015	Charlie	Tessa	Malayalam	Kerala State Film Award for Best Actress	
2016	Bangalore Naatkal	RJ Sarah	Tamil		
2017	Take Off	Sameera	Malayalam	National Film Award – Special Mention; Filmfare Award for Best Actress – Malayalam; SIIMA Award for Best Actress – Malayalam; Kerala State Film Award for Best Actress; IFFI Best Actor – Female	
2017	Qarib Qarib Singlle	Jaya Shashidharan	Hindi		
2018	My Story	Tara & Hema	Malayalam		
2018	Koode	Sophie	Malayalam		
2019	Uyare	Pallavi Raveendran	Malayalam	Vanitha Film Award for Popular Actress	
2019	Virus	Annu	Malayalam	Vanitha Film Award for Popular Actress	
2020	Halal Love Story	Haseena	Malayalam	Cameo	
2021	Varthamanam	Faiza Safiya	Malayalam		
2021	Aanum Pennum	Rachiyamma	Malayalam	Anthology film; segment: Rachiyamma	
2021	Aarkkariyam	Shirley	Malayalam		
2021	Sivaranjiniyum Innum Sila Pengalum	Devaki	Tamil	Anthology film; segment: Devaki	
2022	Puzhu	Bharati	Malayalam	Filmfare Award for Best Supporting Actress – Malayalam	
2022	Wonder Women	Mini	English		
2022	Lalanna's Song	Shoby	Malayalam	Short film	
2023	Kadak Singh	Mimi Kannan	Hindi		
2024	Ullozhukku	Anju	Malayalam	Indian Film Festival of Melbourne – Best Actress; SIIMA Critics Award for Best Actress – Malayalam	
2024	Thangalaan	Gangammal	Tamil	Filmfare Award for Best Supporting Actress-Tamil	
2024	Her	Ruchi	Malayalam	Anthology film; one segment	
2026	Tu Yaa Main	Guest in Konkan Bay	Hindi	Special appearance	
2026	I, Nobody	Meera	Malayalam		
2026	Pradhama Drishtiya Kuttakkar	CPO Aleena Abraham	Malayalam		
2026	Daayra	Kareena Kapoor	Hindi	Malayalam dubbed version	
2027	Captain India †	TBA	Hindi	Filming	
2027	Untitled next †	TBA	Malayalam	Completed	
2027	Untitled next †	TBA	Malayalam	Filming	

== Television ==
List of Parvathy Thiruvothu web series credits
Year	Series	Role	Language	Streaming	Notes	Ref.
2021	Navarasa	Waheeda Begum	Tamil	Netflix	Anthology series; segment: Inmai	
2023	Dhootha	Kranthi Shenoy	Telugu	Prime Video	Eight episodes	
2024	Manorathangal	Sudha	Malayalam	ZEE5	Anthology series; segment: Kazhcha	
2024	Nayanthara: Beyond the Fairytale	Herself	English; Tamil; Malayalam	Netflix	Documentary film	
2026	Storm †	TBA	Hindi	Prime Video	Completed	
2026	Dhootha 2 †	TBA	Telugu	Prime Video	Filming	
