= Arjunan Saakshi =

2011 film

- Theatrical release poster
- Directed by: Ranjith Sankar
- Written by: Ranjith Shankar
- Produced by: S. Sundarajan
- Starring: Prithviraj Sukumaran; Mukesh; Ann Augustine; Biju Menon; Nedumudi Venu; Jagathy Sreekumar; Vijayaraghavan
- Cinematography: Ajayan Vincent
- Edited by: Ranjan Abraham
- Music by: Bijibal
- Production company: S.R.T. Films
- Distributed by: S.R.T. Release
- Release date: 28 January 2011
- Country: India
- Language: Malayalam

Arjunan Saakshi (transl. Arjunan Is Witness) is a 2011 Indian Malayalam language thriller film written and directed by Ranjith Sankar. It stars Prithviraj Sukumaran and Ann Augustine in the lead roles. The film is a thriller which deals with how we evade our responsibility to society. It examines the vertical growth of Kochi both as a metro and a centre of crimes. It was produced by S. Sundararajan under the banner of S. R. T. Films and released on 28 January 2011 to a positive critical reception.

== Plot ==
Anjali Menon, a reporter working with Mathrubhumi, receives a letter from a man identifying himself as 'Arjunan', saying he was the sole witness to the murder of former District Collector Firose Mooppan. The news spreads and the unidentified individual Arjunan becomes a media sensation. After receiving anonymous calls threatening her and her family's safety, Anjali schedules a meeting with Arjunan, with the assistance of Circle Inspector Sebastian. While waiting for Arjunan, a young man named Roy Mathew, sits with Anjali due to a scarcity of free tables, has a coffee and leaves. The police and media assumes Roy to be Arjunan.

Roy is an architect who has moved to Cochin for a new job offer and he gets attacked at his residence and the following day, is briefed by Sebastian, who believes Roy is Arjunan. Roy also meets Firose's father, Dr. Ibrahim, who criticizes Roy for not admitting he is Arjunan and opening up about what he knows about the murder. Roy, with Anjali's help, attempts to prove his innocence, and they schedule a meeting with Dr. Ibrahim. However, they are attacked en route, managing to escape and arrive at Dr. Ibrahim's house to find him killed. Despite being asked to leave Cochin for his own safety, Roy opts to stay and fight.

Realizing that Anjali's phone is being tapped, Roy stages a drama that allows him to follow the trackers, leading him to Aby Abraham, the Managing Director of City Mall. With the help of Thankappan a peon at the Collector's Office, Roy and Anjali attain the blueprints of the abandoned Kochi Metro Rail project, which was shut down following Firose's death. Roy realizes that Aby Abraham, along with his friends Salim Memmen, Rajan Thomas and Unni Natarajan, would have to give up their properties lying on government land, if the project had gone through and suspects that they had colluded to murder Firose. Roy meets Aby, identifying himself as Arjunan, and tells him, along with his four friends, to hand over the properties they murdered Firose for to the government and in return he would hand over to them all evidences he has as the witness of the murder. However, Roy is kidnapped during the meeting, but the kidnappers are ambushed by Sebastian and his team. Realizing Aby and his partners' double-cross, Roy calls for a press meet, and publicly admits that he is Arjunan, saying he has all important evidences against the perpetrators and that he wishes to submit them to the law. A jury of 3 judges is assigned for Roy to submit his evidences to.

A day before Roy is to appear in front of the panel, the four partners agree for a direct meeting with Roy and he gets them into Salim's caravan in which they murdered Firose, and has all of them sign over their respective properties to the government in exchange for his silence. However, Roy double crosses them, revealing that he has taped their confession in the caravan and will submit it along with the documents. The four attempts to kill Roy, but Roy along with his friend Jomy, overpowers and locks them in the caravan. Roy appears in front of the panel, submitting the documents and the recording, admitting that he is not the real Arjunan, but a common civilian who was pulled into the controversy by the media. The four businessmen are taken into custody. Later, while in his office, Anjali hands Roy a letter from Arjunan, who thanks him for everything, while Roy and Anjali share a smile over the one question that remains after everything that has happened: Who is Arjunan..?

== Cast ==
- Prithviraj Sukumaran as Roy Mathew, an architect
- Mukesh as Ernakulam District Collector Firoz Mooppan IAS
- Biju Menon as Aby Abraham, Managing Director of City Mall
- Vijayaraghavan as Ernakulam Town Police Station CI R. Sebastian
- Ann Augustine as Anjali Menon, Mathrubhumi Media Editor
- Nedumudi Venu as P. K. Namboothiri, Managing Editor Of Mathrubhumi
- Jagathy Sreekumar as Dr. Ibrahim Mooppan, Firoz's father
- Suraj Venjaramoodu as Thankappan, Firoz's former Peon
- Salim Kumar as Jackson, a mechanic
- Suresh Krishna as Salim Memmen, Memmem Buliders Owner
- Anand as Rajan Thomas, Cochin Silks CEO
- Niyas as Unni Natarajan, Natarajan Jewellers Assistant CEO
- Vijeesh as Jomy Lawrence
- Ramu as Ernakulam City Police Commissioner DIG V. Jayaraman IPS
- Mithun Nair as Kannan, Anjali's brother
- Ambika Mohan as Devikaamma, Anjali's mother
- Balu Varghese as Selvam

== Production ==
Arjunan Saakshi is the second film by Ranjith Sankar, whose previous film Passenger, another thriller, was met with positive reviews for its novelty and was a box office hit. Ranjith Sankar announced this project in December 2009 with Prithviraj in the lead. The director says that the story of Arjunan Saakshi had been in his mind quite a while when he happened to see an article about a project for a tram network in Kochi, which didn't work out. The strange title of the film find more meaning, as the film progresses, according to the director. According to Prithviraj, Arjunan Saakshi is a contemporary film. He says: "It deals with how we evade our responsibility towards society. We often blame others for everything that goes wrong, but how often do we take responsibility for our actions? We are not ready to sacrifice anything but we tend to forget that we enjoy freedom because people risked their lives to attain it for us."

In Arjunan Saakshi, the lead character Roy Mathew is played by Prithviraj, who started working on the film much before the completion of Santosh Sivan's Urumi and Lijo Jose Pellissery's City of God. Ann Augustine, who debuted through Lal Jose's Elsamma Enna Aankutty in 2010, plays the role of an investigative journalist and a city-bred youngster Anjali Menon, who happens to get involved in certain social issues. The supporting cast includes Jagathy Sreekumar, Nedumudi Venu, Vijayaraghavan, Biju Menon, Suresh Krishna and Vijeesh.

The film was launched on 1 November 2010 in Kochi. The filming occurred at various parts of Kochi. Ajayan Vincent handled the camera while Bijibal composed the music, with lyrics written by Anil Panachooran. The editor of the film was Ranjan Abraham. The costume designer of the film was Sameera Saneesh.

== Release ==
The film released on 28 January 2011 in 70 theatres Prithviraj rated it among his personal favourites and that Arjunan Saakshi was one film he was proud of doing.

=== Critical response ===
Veeyen of Nowrunning.com gave the film 2.5 out of 5 stars, stating, "It is a multi-pointed critique that brings everyone around – the administration, the police force, the state, the media and the general public – under the scanner and unveils a startling story of victims and perpetrators."
