= Parvathy Thiruvothu =

Indian actress (born 1988)

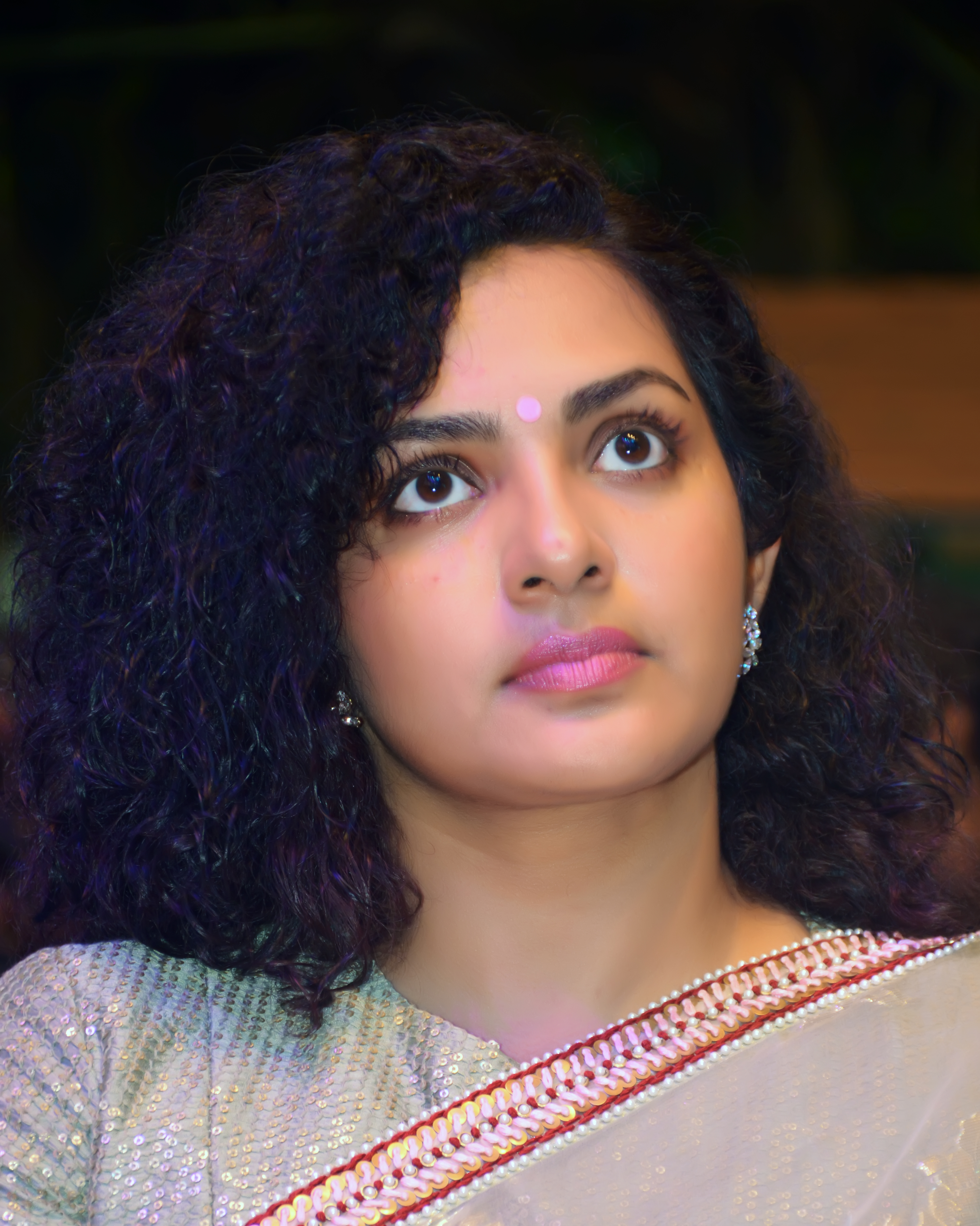
- Parvathy in 2018
- Born: Parvathy Thiruvothu Kottuvatta; 7 April 1988 (age 38); Kozhikode, Kerala, India
- Education: All Saints College, Thiruvananthapuram
- Occupation: Actress
- Years active: 2006–present
- Works: Full list

Parvathy Thiruvothu Kottuvatta (born 7 April 1988), known mononymously as Parvathy, is an Indian actress who predominantly works in Malayalam and Tamil films. She has received several accolades including one National Film Award, two Kerala State Film Awards and six Filmfare Awards.

Parvathy began her acting career with the Malayalam film Out of Syllabus in 2006, and gained critical acclaim for her performance in the Tamil romantic drama Poo (2008). She rose to prominence with her roles in Bangalore Days (2014), Ennu Ninte Moideen (2015), Charlie (2015), Take Off (2017), Uyare (2019), and Virus (2019). Beyond acting, Parvathy is a founding member of the Women in Cinema Collective.

== Early life ==
Parvathy was born in Atholi on 7 April 1988 in Kozhikode, Kerala, to P. Vinod Kumar and T. K. Usha Kumari, both of whom are lawyers. She has a brother, Aum Thiruvothu Karunakaran.

During her schooling years, her family moved and settled at Thiruvananthapuram. After completing her schooling at Kendriya Vidyalaya, Pangode, she did her Bachelor of Arts in English literature at the All Saints College, Thiruvananthapuram.

Parvathy worked as a television anchor at Kiran TV, a full-time music-based channel located in Thiruvananthapuram. She is also a trained dancer, specialized in Bharatanatyam.

== Career ==
=== Acting debut and success (2006–2011) ===
Parvathy made her acting debut in the 2006 Malayalam film Out of Syllabus, portraying a supporting role as a college student. Her second venture, Rosshan Andrrews' Notebook, won media attention due to its theme on teenage pregnancy. She appeared alongside Roma Asrani and Mariya Roy, after being picked for one of the three main roles from among 5,000 applicants. She was also seen in Sathyan Anthikkad's comedy-drama film, Vinodayathra (2007), playing a supporting role alongside an ensemble cast including Dileep, Mukesh and Meera Jasmine.

Her first leading role was in the Kannada film Milana, which became a commercial success upon release. Pairing alongside Puneet Rajkumar, she was a surprise selection for the film and began working on the film in April 2007. The film won mixed reviews, but the actress's role was praised with a critic noting she "has been a wonderful selection for the role", adding that "she has that right attitude for the role". The film went on to become a big commercial success, running for 500 days at a multiplex in Bangalore. She returned to the Malayalam industry portraying the leading female role in Sibi Malayil's Flash with Mohanlal and Indrajith, and prior to release revealed that she hoped the film would give a breakthrough as a lead actress in the industry. However, the film failed commercially and garnered poor reviews on release.

Parvathy was selected to play the lead role in Sasi's Poo (2008) and featured alongside Srikanth, portraying the role of a young Tamil village girl named Maari. She revealed that director Sasi selected her after a successful audition, and she learned Tamil to better understand the character. To acclimatize to the role, she had to get her skin tone several shades darker and also visited a firework factory to study Maari's occupation. The actress revealed she found it difficult get out of character and became emotionally attached to the role she had played. Upon release, the film and her performance won rave reviews. A critic from Sify.com noted "Parvathy has lived in the role of Maari and takes your breath away as she effortlessly delivers such a difficult role so convincingly on her debut in Tamil", adding that "she is consistently credible and lifelike and absolutely riveting." Similarly, Rediff.com's reviewer mentioned that Poo is "almost entirely Parvathy's film" noting that "she's superb", while Malathi Rangarajan of The Hindu wrote, "Parvathy makes optimum use and plays a rustic belle to the hilt in attire and expression, also getting the body language right." The actress subsequently went on to win the Filmfare Award for Best Tamil Actress, while also securing other accolades and nominations from several other award juries, notably winning the Vijay Award for Best Debut Actress.

Her only release in 2009 was the Kannada film, Male Barali Manju Irali, directed by Vijayalakshmi Singh, where she dubbed for the role in her own voice. Parvathy accepted the venture, which featured mostly rookie technicians, noting that she was impressed by the director's script and revealed she had turned down several offers from Tamil filmmakers during the period who had wanted to cast her in roles similar to her character from Poo. The film won rave reviews, with a critic noting "Parvathy steals the show" and that "she comes with one of the most absorbing performances", adding that "her level of commitment to the role could be gauged by the way she has taken pains to dub in an alien language almost perfectly."

In 2010, Parvathy reunited with Puneet Rajkumar for Prithvi, which was based on the political landscape of Karnataka. The director has earmarked her for the role while writing the script following the success of Milana. Although the film opened to positive reviews, critics pointed out that Parvathy's character had limited scope, noting that "she was mostly confined to the songs".

In 2011, she starred in Lijo Jose Pellissery's City of God, which garnered mixed reviews. Despite its commercial failure, critics praised her performance as a Tamil refugee girl, calling her "brilliant" and a "dynamo". After the film, Parvathy took a break from acting.

=== Established actress (2013–2018) ===
After a two-year break from films, Parvathy made her comeback in 2013 with the Kannada romantic film Andhar Bahar co-starring Shivrajkumar, which told the story of the relationship between a newly married criminal and his wife. She dubbed in her own voice for the film again, revealing that she chose to star in the film as the role had scope for her to perform. The film received positive reviews, with one critic noting "Parvathy lights up the screen whenever she appears and is a delight to watch".

She was next seen in the 2013 Tamil thriller, Chennaiyil Oru Naal, featuring her alongside an ensemble cast. The film, a remake of the 2011 Malayalam film Traffic, has its narrative in a hyperlink format and Parvathy won good reviews for her small role as Aditi. She then signed on for the lead role in Bharat Bala's romantic drama Maryan, opposite Dhanush. The director had seen her performance in Poo and subsequently auditioned her for the part, with Parvathy noting that the character was the best she has played to date. She portrayed Panimalar, a girl in love with the titular character Maryan, who inspires him to overcome his struggles. During production, Parvathy worked with fishermen to get into the mind of her character, while also learning to swim to perform the film's underwater scenes. The film was a critical and commercial success upon its release in June 2013. A reviewer from Sify.com noted Parvathy "leaves a lasting impression", while another critic noted that she "is totally in sync with Dhanush all the way; she has matched him step for step, never allowing him to overshadow her." The Times of India noted "Parvathy is the other pillar of the film, and comes up with a scintillating performance", adding "it is such a pleasure to watch her portray various emotions". Her portrayal as Panimalar earned her multiple nominations for Best Actress, most notably the Filmfare Award for Best Actress - Tamil and the Vijay Award for Best Actress.

In 2014, Parvathy appeared in Bangalore Days, directed by Anjali Menon, which became a major commercial success, with reports claiming as "one of the biggest hits in the history of Malayalam cinema". The film featured an ensemble cast, including Dulquer Salmaan, Nivin Pauly, Fahadh Faasil, Nazriya Nazim, Nithya Menen and Isha Talwar. Parvathy played RJ Sarah, a paraplegic radio jockey. For the role, she won the Filmfare Award for Best Supporting Actress – Malayalam.

In 2015, Parvathy appeared in Ennu Ninte Moideen which narrated the tragic love tale of Kanchanamala and Moideen which happened in the 1960s in Mukkam, a riverside village in Kerala. The film received positive reviews. Parvathy's performance was acclaimed critically and commercially, and won her first Filmfare Award for Best Actress – Malayalam. The same year she appeared in Uttama Villain, a Tamil film directed by Ramesh Aravind, starring Kamal Haasan. The film featured an ensemble cast, including K. Balachander, Jayaram, Urvashi and Andrea Jeremiah. Parvathy appeared in the film in a supporting role. Her final release of 2015 was Charlie, where she starred alongside Dulquer Salmaan, Aparna Gopinath and Nedumudi Venu. The film, a light-hearted adventure-drama, was a major commercial success and went on to win eight Kerala State Film Awards. Parvathy played Tessa, a young woman searching for the film's title character. For Charlie and Ennu Ninte Moideen, she won the Kerala State Film Award for Best Actress as well as the Filmfare Award for Best Actress – Malayalam for Ennu Ninte Moideen.

In 2016, Parvathy reprised her role as RJ Sarah in Bangalore Naatkal, the Tamil remake of the 2014 Malayalam hit Bangalore Days. Directed by Bommarillu Bhaskar, the film was an adaptation of the original, focusing on the lives of three cousins navigating life and relationships in Bangalore.

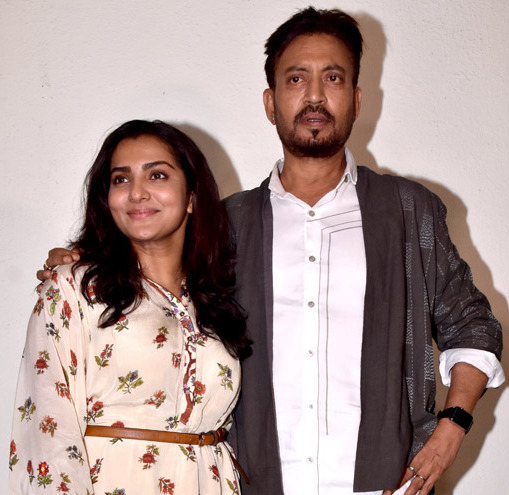
Irrfan Khan and Parvathy Thiruvothu at a special screening of Qarib Qarib Singlle

In 2017, Parvathy starred in Take Off, directed by Mahesh Narayan and starring Kunchacko Boban and Fahadh Faasil. The film was screened at international festivals, including the International Film Festival of India and the International Film Festival of Kerala, and enjoyed a theatrical run of over 125 days. Parvathy's performance earned her the IFFI Best Actor Award (Female), making her the first Indian actress to win the Silver Peacock award. She was also nominated for the National Film Award for Best Actress, where she lost to Sridevi in the final round but won her first National Film Award – Special Mention. She also secured her second Kerala State Film Award for Best Actress and another Filmfare Award for Best Actress – Malayalam. Parvathy made her Bollywood debut in 2017, starring opposite Irrfan Khan in the romantic comedy Qarib Qarib Singlle. Directed by Tanuja Chandra, the film follows the journey of two contrasting individuals who meet through a dating app and embark on a road trip across India. Parvathy played Jaya, a widow who meets Irrfan Khan's character through a dating app.

In 2018, Parvathy appeared in My Story, a romantic drama directed by Roshni Dinaker. She was paired with Prithviraj Sukumaran in this film, marking their second collaboration after Ennu Ninte Moideen. Following My Story, Parvathy's next release in 2018 was Koode, directed by Anjali Menon. This marked her third collaboration with Prithviraj and her second with both Anjali Menon and Nazriya Nazim, who was making her comeback after a four-year break. Koode is a drama about family and loss.

=== Continued success and expanding horizons (2019–present) ===
In 2019, Parvathy appeared in Uyare, directed by debutant Manu Ashokan. She played Pallavi Raveendran, an aspiring pilot who survives an acid attack. Her second release in 2019 was Aashiq Abu's Virus, a medical thriller based on the real-life Nipah virus outbreak that occurred in Kerala in 2018. Produced by Rima Kallingal, the film featured an ensemble cast and depicted the response to the 2018 Nipah virus outbreak in Kerala. Parvathy played the role of Dr. Annu.

In 2020, Parvathy made a cameo appearance in Halal Love Story, a satirical comedy directed by Zakariya Mohammed. The film revolves around a group of aspiring filmmakers attempting to create a film that aligns with their religious values.

The following year, Parvathy had three releases: Varthamanam, Aanum Pennum and Aarkkariyam. In Varthamanam, directed by Siddhartha Siva, she played a central role as a student activist. Aanum Pennum is an anthology film consisting of three stories set in different periods in Kerala. The segments were directed by Aashiq Abu, Venu, and Jay K. Parvathy appeared as Rachiyamma in one of the film's segments. In Aarkkariyam, a thriller directed by Sanu Varghese, Parvathy starred alongside Biju Menon and Sharaf U Dheen in a film set against the backdrop of the COVID-19 pandemic. She also made her debut in web series through Tamil Anthology series Navarasa in the segment Inmai.

In 2022, she took on a prominent role in Puzhu, a psychological drama directed by Ratheena, where she starred alongside Mammootty. The film deals with caste and prejudice. It was her first film with Mammootty. Additionally, in 2022, Parvathy appeared in Wonder Women, an Indian English-language film directed by Anjali Menon. The film, centred on a group of pregnant women navigating the challenges of impending motherhood, featured an ensemble cast that included Nadiya Moidu, Nithya Menen, Padmapriya Janakiraman and Amruta Subhash.

In 2023, Parvathy made her return to Hindi cinema with Kadak Singh, a psychological thriller directed by Aniruddha Roy Chowdhury. She played the role of a head nurse who interacts with Pankaj Tripathi's character, a man suffering from retrograde amnesia. The same year, Parvathy acted in a web series Dhootha, a supernatural thriller on Amazon Prime Video. Directed by Vikram Kumar and starring Naga Chaitanya, the series centres around inanimate objects that possess sinister powers. She portrayed DCP Kranthi Shenoy, a strict investigative officer.

In 2024, Parvathy appeared in Ullozhukku, Thangalaan and Her. In Ullozhukku, a family drama directed by Christo Tomy, Parvathy portrayed the character of Anju. Her performance earned her the Best Performance (Female) award at the Indian Film Festival of Melbourne. In Thangalaan, a Tamil period drama directed by Pa. Ranjith and set during the British colonial era in the Kolar Gold Fields, Parvathy portrayed Gangamma. In Her, directed by Lijin Jose, Parvathy portrayed Ruchi in the anthology film. In the same year, she played the central character Sudha in Kazhcha a segment of the Malayalam Anthology series Manorathangal directed by Shyamaprasad.

== Other works and advocacy ==
In the early stages of her career, Parvathy was often credited as "Parvathy Menon" by the media. This misattribution arose from an interview following the release of Milana (2007), where the interviewer assumed her surname was Menon since she was credited only by her first name. Despite her efforts to correct this misconception, the name persisted in media references. In 2015, Parvathy publicly clarified that her surname is Thiruvothu, not Menon, and emphasized that she never had a surname in any of her official documents except her birth certificate and expressed her desire to be referred to simply as "Parvathy", without any caste-based surname.

In 2016, she became one of the first actors in Indian cinema to openly criticize misogyny in films. She specifically named the Malayalam film Kasaba for its problematic portrayal of women, urging veteran actors like Mammootty to refrain from roles that perpetuate such stereotypes. Her statement provoked significant backlash and cyberbullying from fans, with two individuals later arrested for online abuse. In 2017, Parvathy spoke about Islamophobia in Indian films, including in her own projects such as Ennu Ninte Moideen and Take Off, acknowledging past mistakes and vowing to approach such themes more responsibly in the future.

In 2019, during a Film Companion roundtable at the International Film Festival of India (IFFI), she criticized Arjun Reddy and Kabir Singh for glorifying toxic masculinity and abuse. Her remarks, made in the presence of lead actor Vijay Deverakonda, were widely praised for addressing these issues.

In October 2020, Parvathy resigned from the Association of Malayalam Movie Artists (AMMA) to protest controversial remarks by General Secretary Edavela Babu about a fellow female actor. She called for his resignation and urged other members of the body to seek the same.

In 2024, she criticized Netflix's decision to remove the film Annapoorani following controversies, calling it a dangerous precedent for censorship. She addressed the Hema Committee Report, which investigated malpractices in the Malayalam film industry. She described the report's release as a "bitter-sweet" moment and said it should be used to improve working conditions in the industry. Parvathy advocated for similar studies across other industries.

Parvathy is also a founding member of the Women in Cinema Collective (WCC), an organization dedicated to improving working conditions and addressing gender-based challenges faced by women in Malayalam cinema.

== Media image ==
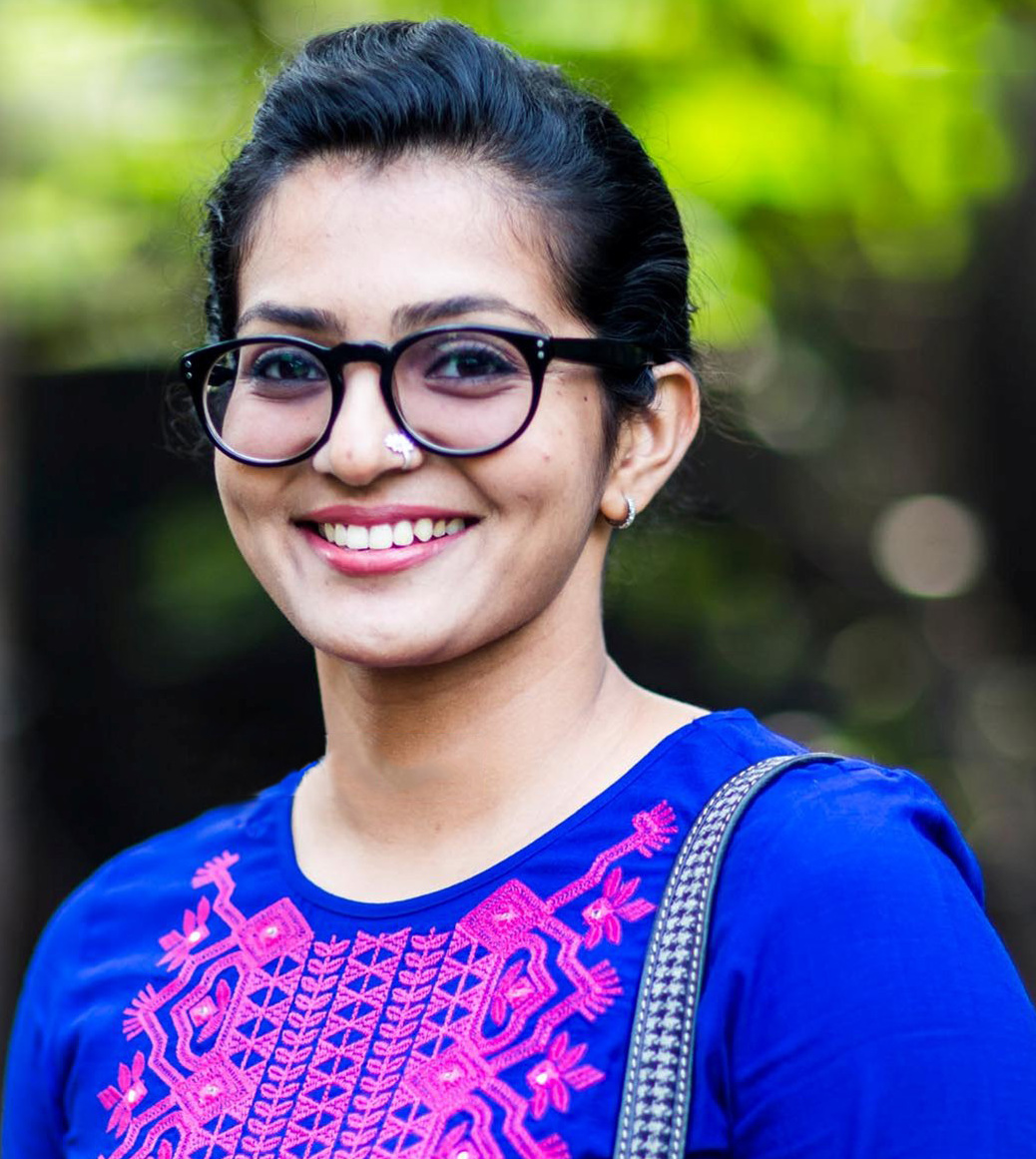
Parvathy in 2016

Parvathy's characters in Take Off, Uyare and Charlie are recognized as some of the strongest portrayals of female characters in Malayalam cinema. She was named the Kochi Times Most Desirable Women in 2017. In the same list, she was placed 2nd in 2018 and 10th in 2020. In 2015, Rediff.com named Parvathy as the "Best Malayalam Actress" of the year. She is also considered as one of the highest paid Malayalam actresses.

== Accolades ==
- 2008: Filmfare Award for Best Actress – Tamil for Poo.
- 2008: Vijay Award for Best Debut Actress for Poo.
- 2014: Filmfare Award for Best Supporting Actress – Malayalam for Bangalore Days.
- 2015: Kerala State Film Award for Best Actress for Charlie and Ennu Ninte Moideen.
- 2015: Filmfare Award for Best Actress – Malayalam for Ennu Ninte Moideen.
- 2015: IIFA Utsavam Award for Best Actress – Malayalam for Ennu Ninte Moideen.
- 2016: National Film Award – Special Mention for Take Off.
- 2016: Filmfare Award for Best Actress – Malayalam for Take Off.
- 2016: SIIMA Award for Best Actress – Malayalam for Take Off.
- 2017: Kerala State Film Award for Best Actress for Take Off.
- 2017: IFFI Best Actor – Female for Take Off.
- 2020: Vanitha Film Award for Popular Actress for Uyare and Virus.
- 2023: Filmfare Award for Best Supporting Actress – Malayalam for Puzhu.
- 2024: Indian Film Festival of Melbourne – Best Actress for Ullozhukku.
- 2025: SIIMA Critics Award for Best Actress – Malayalam for Ullozhukku.
- 2026: Filmfare Award for Best Supporting Actress-Tamil for Thangalaan
