= Paathirathri =

Indian Malayalam-language drama thriller film

- Theatrical Release Poster
- Directed by: Ratheena PT
- Written by: Shaji Maraad
- Produced by: Dr KV Abdul Nazar; Ashiya Nazar
- Starring: Soubin Shahir; Navya Nair
- Cinematography: Shehnad Jalal
- Edited by: Sreejith Sarang
- Music by: Jakes Bejoy
- Production company: Benzy Productions
- Release date: 17 October 2025
- Running time: 128 minutes
- Country: India
- Language: Malayalam

Paathirathri is a 2025 Indian Malayalam-language drama thriller film directed by Ratheena PT. The film stars Navya Nair and Soubin Shahir in the lead roles. The film is produced by KV Abdul Nazar and Ashiya Nazar for Benzy Productions. The film generally received mixed reviews from critics.

== Plot ==
Paathirathri is a crime thriller drama, where Hareesh and Jancy Kurian are cops. During a routine night patrol, police officers Jancy and Hareesh encounter a suspiciously parked car. As they approach, a man flees into a nearby swamp. Hareesh, fearing a bureaucratic backlash if an accident occurs on their watch, convinces a hesitant Jancy to abandon the chase and report nothing. Shortly after, they are diverted by their Circle Inspector (CI) to investigate the suicide of a young girl in Manthara.

Returning to the swamp out of guilt, Jancy is unsettled to find the area recently covered with sand. Her anxiety is compounded by a deteriorating marriage to her husband, Felix, who has become emotionally distant through a spiritual obsession to Tibet. Similarly, Hareesh faces a personal crisis as his wife files for divorce and seeks sole custody of their daughter.

The situation escalates when a missing person’s report is filed for Ansar, a journalist whose body is eventually discovered in the pit. Realizing the man they chased was Ansar, Jancy and Hareesh find themselves in a precarious position. The investigation is assigned to DySP Suresh, a cunning officer known for framing innocents. Suspecting Jancy and Hareesh were at the scene, Suresh discovers a link between the victim and Felix, who had contacted Ansar multiple times. Exploiting Jancy’s strained marriage and the hidden separation from her husband, Suresh weaves a narrative framing the duo for the murder, resulting in their suspension.

Operating parallel to the official inquiry, Hareesh discovers the car from the crime scene belongs to Suresh’s daughter, Anjali. Their investigation uncovers a clandestine past relationship between Anjali and Ansar. While Jancy fails to convince Anjali of her father’s corruption, Hareesh finds evidence that Suresh used subordinate officers, Binoy and Bijoy, to harm Ansar. Further clues emerge when they discover that the boyfriend of the girl who committed suicide in Manthara was an eyewitness to Ansar’s death. He provides them with an encrypted memory device containing vital data.

Confronted with the truth, Anjali aligns with the duo and confesses to the Superintendent of Police (SP). She reveals that Suresh harbored a long-standing vendetta against Ansar, not just for their rekindled affair, but because Ansar had uncovered evidence of Suresh’s past custodial brutality. With the evidence seemingly conclusive, Suresh is arrested, and Jancy and Hareesh are reinstated.

However, Jancy remains skeptical. She recalls the terrified reaction of the witness when he saw a photo of a woman on her phone—Ansar’s wife, Yasmin. Returning to the crime scene, Jancy finds an earring belonging to Yasmin. The true sequence of events is revealed: Yasmin had discovered Ansar’s infidelity. On the night of the patrol, after Hareesh and Jancy abandoned the chase, Yasmin—who had been following Ansar—confronted him. When Ansar declared his eternal love for Anjali, a fit of rage led Yasmin to drown him in the swamp. Recognizing the tragedy of Yasmin’s situation, Jancy chooses to suppress the evidence, allowing the official case against Suresh to stand, and requests a transfer to start anew.

== Cast ==
- Navya Nair as Probation SI Jancy Kurian
- Soubin Shahir as CPO Hareesh N.V.
- Sunny Wayne as Ansar Ali
- Ann Augustine as Yasmin
- Athmiya Rajan as Anjali
- Achyuth Kumar as DYSP Suresh Kumar Menon
- Harisree Ashokan as Grade SI Rasheed
- Indrans as Sahadevan
- Shabareesh Varma as Felix
- Pooja Mohanraj as Beat Forest Officer
- Thejas EK as Roby
- Jayaprakash as Sabari
- Binu Thomman as SHO Jobin George
- Sohan Seenulal as Head Constable Dingan
- Manikuttan as Rajiv
- Cobra Rajesh as Thief
- Athulya Ashadom as Sr.Bency

== Production ==
=== Casting ===
Director Ratheena PT, who made the critically acclaimed Mammootty film Puzhu was assigned to direct Soubin Shahir and Navya Nair for Benzy Productions. The script was written by Shaji Maraad, a cop himself, who co-wrote Ela Veezha Poonchira. The presence of actors Sunny Wayne, Ann Augustine and Shabareesh Varma were made public on the title announcement day. The film was censored with U/A certificate.

=== Filming ===
Principal photography of the film was wrapped up on 27 November 2024.

=== Marketing ===
The title of the film, with a tagline that read, 'One Night, Two Cops', was announced on 10 June 2024. The first look poster of the film was released on 11 September 2025 and the trailer was released on 10 October 2025.

Actress Navya Nair, during the promotion of the film, encountered an alarming situation, when a man reportedly harassed the actress, but actor Soubin Shahir quickly helped in prioritizing her safety.

== Release ==
=== Theatrical ===
The film was released on 17 October 2025.

=== Home Media ===
The post-theatrical streaming rights of the film is acquired by ZEE5 and started streaming from 20 February 2026.

== Reception ==
=== Critical reception ===
Gopika Is of The Times of India rated the film 2.5/5 stars and wrote: "Paathirathri could have been a far better film if it had been made with more conviction — and with a clearer understanding of what may no longer excite audiences at a time when Malayalam cinema is churning out thrillers in quick succession."

Anandu Suresh of The Indian Express rated the film 2/5 stars and wrote, "Where the crime drama falters is in its inability to strike a chord with viewers, leaving them as mere observers rather than drawing them into the film’s world and making them feel part of its unfolding events."

Princy Alexander of Onmanorama praised the first half of Paathirathri, with the introduction of intriguing characters and a subplot provides comic relief and highlights Jancy's competence. According to her, the film is considered a strong addition to the trend of character-driven police dramas. However, she criticised the second half of the film, stating that the film reduces Navya's role and suffers from the excessiveness of the plot's elements, which makes it "scattered and disengaging." Shehnad Jalal's cinematography is praised for skillfully amplifying "tension and fear in critical scenes." However, Jakes Bejoy's musical score is described as "generic".

S. R. Praveen of The Hindu wrote, "In following a genre by the book, Paathirathri fails to bring any novelty to the table or inject excitement into the proceedings."

Vignesh Madhu of The New Indian Express rated the film 2/5 stars and wrote, "But except for the overarching theme of marital discord, Paathirathri is not as layered or socially relevant. It also suffers heavily while trying to craft an engaging narrative around the central crime. This is despite the film promising a lot at the halfway point when Hareesh and Jancy's worst fears come true. But everything that follows is too basic and familiar, especially the investigation."

Gayathri Krishna of OTTplay rated the film 3.5/5 stars and wrote, "Power dynamics in the police system, strained marriages, and the weight of responsibility as well as truth are all explored in a transparent way in Ratheena-directed thriller."
