= Sreeram Ramachandran =

Indian actor

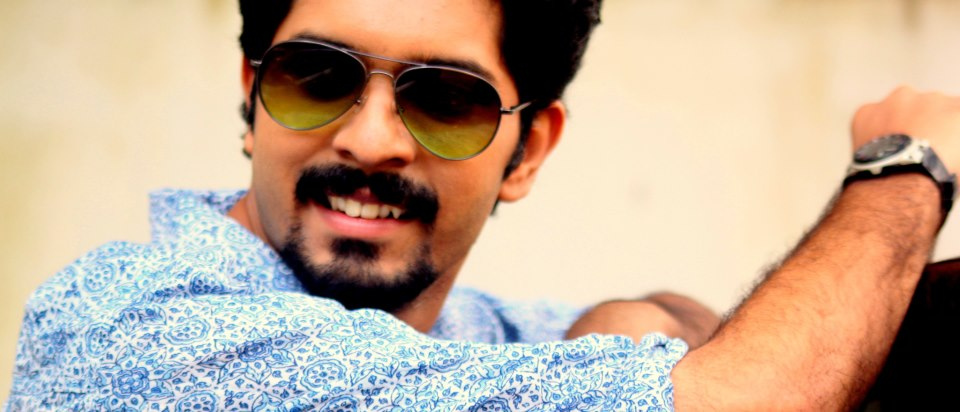
- Born: 10 March 1987 (age 39); Kozhikode, Kerala.
- Education: AWH Engineering College, Kozhikode
- Occupation: Actor
- Years active: 2010–present
- Spouse: Vanditha
- Children: Vismaya, Sanmaya

Sreeram Ramachandran is an Indian actor who works in Malayalam films, TV series, short films, music albums and web series

== Career ==
Sreeram made his movie debut in 2010 through Malarvadi Arts Club, directed by Vineeth Sreenivasan. His second collaboration with Vineeth was Thattathin Marayathu (2012). He played the lead role in the sitcom Chumma, telecast on Amrita TV.

In 2013, he acted as the second lead in Artist, alongside Fahadh Faasil and Ann Augustine. He played the lead character Jeeva in the TV series Kasthooriman on Asianet.

== Early life ==
Sreeram Ramachandran was born in Kozhikode, Kerala. His father, Palai C. K. Ramachandran, is an accomplished senior Carnatic musician and the primary disciple of Sri Semmangudi Srinivasa Iyer.

During his post-college days, he was selected by Vineeth Sreenivasan to play a small role in his directorial debut Malarvadi Arts Club and later in Thattathin Marayathu.

His brother Jayaram Ramachandran is a graphics designer and animator in the film industry. He went to college at Chinmaya Vidyalaya Kozhikode and pursued engineering at AWH Engineering College, Kozhikode.

== Awards and nominations ==
| Year | Award | Category | Serial | Result |
|---|---|---|---|---|
| 2018 | Asianet television awards 2018 | Best Actor | Kasthooriman | Nominated |
| 2018 | Asianet television awards 2018 | Best New face male | Kasthooriman | Nominated |
| 2018 | Asianet television awards 2018 | Youth Icon | Kasthooriman | Won |
| 2018 | Asianet television awards 2018 | Best popular Actor | Kasthooriman | Nominated |
| 2019 | Asianet television awards 2019 | Best Actor | Kasthooriman | Won |
| 2019 | Asianet television awards 2019 | Best popular Actor | Kasthooriman | Nominated |
| 2019 | Asianet television awards 2019 | Best Star Pair | Kasthooriman | Nominated |
| 2020 | Makaranilavu 2020 | Nadanakala rathna | Kasthooriman | Won |
| 2020 | Vishwasri Dhanvanthari krishnamurthi Charitable trust | Nadanaratna Puraskar | Kasthooriman | Won |
| 2020 | Times of India | Most desirable Man on Television | Kasthooriman | Won |

== Filmography ==
=== Films ===
| Year | Title | Role | Director | Notes |
|---|---|---|---|---|
| 2009 | Villu | —N/a | Assistant director | Tamil film |
| 2010 | Malarvadi Arts Club | Geethu's brothers friend | Vineeth Sreenivasan | Debut |
| 2012 | Thattathin Marayathu | Nijad of Smart Boyz | Vineeth Sreenivasan | |
| 2013 | Artist | Abhinav | Shyamaprasad | |
| 2015 | Just Married | Joe | Sajan Joseph | |
| 2018 | Orayiram Kinakkalal | Gautam | Pramod Mohan | |
| 2019 | Uyare | Deepak | Manu Ashokan | |
| 2023 | Archie's | Reginald Mantle | Netflix | Dubbing artist (Malayalam version) |
| 2024 | Abraham Ozler | Speech therapist | Midhun Manuel Thomas | |
| 2024 | Varshangalkku Shesham | Art Director of Jeevithagaadhakale | Vineeth Sreenivasan | |
| 2024 | Her | Sanal | Lijin Jose | |

=== Web series ===
| Year | Title | Role | Notes |
|---|---|---|---|
| 2019 | Best Friends Kalyanam Kazhichal | Himself | Ponmutta Media |
| 2021-2022 | Unnam Marannu Thenni Parannu | Siju Rajan | |
| 2024 | Nagendran's Honeymoons | Savithri's boyfriend | Disney+ Hotstar |
| 2024 | Kodeeshwaran | Rishi | Pocket FM |

=== Television serials ===
| Year | Serial | Role | Channel | Notes |
|---|---|---|---|---|
| 2012 | Just Fun Chumma | Anand | Amrita TV | |
| 2016 | Jagratha | | Amrita TV | |
| 2017–2021 | Kasthoorimaan | Jeeva (a.k.a.Kannan) | Asianet | |
| 2020 | Avarodoppam Aliyum Achayanum | Jeeva | Asianet | Telefilm |
| 2021 | Swantham Sujatha | Vasudevan | Surya TV | Cameo Appearance |
| 2023 | Maata thinte soundaryam | Host | Asianet | vishu special TV show |
| 2023 | cook with comedy | Contestant | Asianet | |
| 2024 | Santhwanam 2 | Saran | Asianet | |

=== Other works ===
| Year | Title | Role | Director | Notes |
|---|---|---|---|---|
| 2013 | Ninayathe | Himself | Ganesh Raj | Music album |
| 2017 | Lets take a break | Sreeram | Pramod Mohan | Music album |
| 2017 | Aliveni | Himself | Jairam Ramachandran | Music album |
| 2017 | Rollie | Rollie Camera | Abhay Stephen | Short Film |
| 2017 | Across the Ocean | Anand | Uma Kumarapuram -Nicole Donadio | Short film |
| 2017 | Padippura | Vishvam | Rajeesh Raj | Short Film |
| 2017 | Nuzhainthaley | Sriram | Ganesh Raj | Music album |
| 2019 | Chilla | Sudheesh | Umesh | Music album |
| 2020 | Maash | Sidharth | Uma Nanda | Short film |
| 2021 | Mangalyam Bandhunanena | Rajesh | Ponmutta Media | short film |
| 2021 | manamaghanin sathiyam | | jayram ramachandran | Tamil music album |
| 2022 | Pattampoochi | | Joji Vadapuram | Tamil Music album |
| 2022 | Dhoore Dhoore | | Midhun Bose | Music album |
| 2022 | varshamayi | | Suman Nair | Music album |
| 2022 | Kalyani | | Dr.jithin | Music album |
| 2022 | nee aaro | | jayram ramachandran | Music album |
| 2023 | Rasa | | Subish | Music album |
| 2024 | Roses | | Asha | Music album |
| 2024 | Jeevya | | Vineeth Sreenivasan | Music album |
