= Molly Aunty Rocks! =

- Teaser poster
- Directed by: Ranjith Sankar
- Written by: Ranjith Sankar
- Produced by: Ranjith Sankar
- Starring: Revathi; Prithviraj Sukumaran
- Cinematography: Sujith Vaassudev
- Edited by: Lijo Paul
- Music by: Anand Madhusoodanan
- Production company: Dreams N' Beyond
- Distributed by: August Cinema
- Release date: 14 September 2012
- Running time: 128 minutes
- Country: India
- Language: Malayalam

Molly Aunty Rocks! is a 2012 Indian Malayalam-language comedy film written, directed and produced by Ranjith Sankar. The film stars Revathi alongside Prithviraj Sukumaran in an extended cameo appearance. It was released on 14 September 2012 and received positive reviews from critics and audiences alike.

== Synopsis ==
Molly is an unstoppable woman, who will do only what she feels is right. Molly's world is unique and she is its unquestioned queen. Pranav, an Assistant Commissioner of Income Tax is an egoistic bureaucrat of the Indian Revenue Service, who wants his system and power to rule over the subjects. When both of them clash, sparks fly and egos would not relent. Will Molly rock or will Pranav get her locked?

== Cast ==
- Revathi as Molly Aunty
- Prithviraj Sukumaran as Pranav Roy (special appearance)
- Lalu Alex as Benny
- K.P.A.C. Lalitha
- Mamukkoya as Salim
- Krishna Kumar as Ravi
- Sharath as Kochachan
- Shivaji Guruvayoor as Menon
- Sunil Sukhada as Shamsudheen
- Lakshmi Priya as Usha
- Rajesh Hebbar as Sunny
- Kavitha

== Release and reception ==
The film released on 14 September 2012 got a positive reception. Sify rated the film as very good and praised Revathy for her performance. Sify says "Molly Aunty Rocks is a gripping and engaging tale of a woman, who is well aware about what she wants from life. She is egoistic but her thoughts are noble". Sify gives the verdict "Go for it. Good".

Paresh C Palicha on Rediff.com rates it 3/5 and says "Molly Aunty really Rocks". He says in his review "Hats off to writer-director Ranjit Sankar who has made a superhero out of Revathy. She hogs the limelight here in a way she has not done in the prime of her career.Revathy plays the part with dignity and grace. She remains likeable throughout because of the control she keeps and the special effort that the director has made to keep her a genuine person and not make her an oddity.Director Ranjit Sankar and Revathy make Molly Aunty rock." However, IBNLive termed the movie as average. Aswin J Kumar of The Times of India was also not impressed with the film and gave it a rating of 2/5.

Sify.com updated the Box Office status of Molly Aunty Rocks as "Molly Aunty is a Winner at BO". It says in the article "Director Ranjith Sankar's Molly Aunty Rocks has gained the maximum response from the viewers, among the four Malayalam releases of last weekend. "The collections were average for the first two shows on Friday and things started looking better from the evening shows. Sunday was really great and things are looking absolutely bright right now," says Ranjith Sankar."

== Accolades ==
| Ceremony | Category | Nominee | Result |
|---|---|---|---|
| 2nd South Indian International Movie Awards | Best Actress | Revathi | Nominated |
