= Ratheena P. T. =

Indian film director and producer

Ratheena PT
- Born: 5 May 1983 (age 43); Kozhikode, Kerala, India
- Occupations: Film director; Producer
- Years active: 2010–present
- Spouse: Muhammad Sharshad (div. 2020)

Ratheena PT is an Indian film director and producer who predominantly works in Malayalam films. She directed Puzhu.

== Biography ==
Ratheena started her film career in 2010 as an assistant to Malayalam director Revathi. Her debut as an independent director was marked by the release of the movie Puzhu.

== Personal life ==
She was married to Chennai-based businessman Muhammad Sharshad, they divorced in 2020.

== Filmography ==
Year	Title	Notes	Ref.
2012	Red Building where the Sun Sets	Assistant Director	
2019	Uyare	Executive Producer	
2022	Puzhu	Director	
2023	Janaki Jaane	Executive Producer	
2025	Paathirathri	Director	
TBA	Untitled Vismaya Mohanlal movie	Co-writer	
