= Wonder Woman 2 =

Wonder Woman 2 or variation, may refer to:

- Wonder Woman 1984 (2020 film) sequel film to 2017 film Wonder Woman set in the DC Extended Universe (DCEU) cinematic universe
- Wonder Woman (2011 TV pilot), the failed second Wonder Woman live-action TV series
- Wonder Woman Volume II, various second volumes of various Wonder-Woman comic books, see Publication history of Wonder Woman
- Wonder Woman (Earth-Two), the Wonder Woman of the alternate universe "Earth-Two" in DC Comics universe
- Alternative versions of Wonder Woman, a successor or replacement of the original Wonder Woman, Diana Prince
- Wonder Girl, Wonder Woman's teen sidekick and potential successor

== See also ==
- Wonder Woman (disambiguation)
