= Wonder Women =

Wonder Women may refer to:

- Wonder Women (1973 film), an American action film
- Wonder Women (1987 film), a Hong Kong film starring Carol Cheng
- Wonder Women (2007 film), a Hong Kong film directed by Wong Chun-chun
- Wonder Women! The Untold Story of American Superheroines, a 2012 American documentary film
- Wonder Women (2022 film), an Indian English-language film
- Wonder Women (TV series), a Hong Kong TVB drama in 2019

== See also ==
- Wonder Woman (disambiguation)
