= Dreams in Prussian Blue =

2010 novel by Paritosh Uttam

- Author: Paritosh Uttam
- Language: English
- Subject: Novel
- Genre: Fiction
- Published: Penguin Books India
- Publication date: 2010
- Publication place: India
- Media type: Book
- Pages: 204 pages
- ISBN: 978-01-4306-681-1

Dreams in Prussian Blue is a fiction novel written by Paritosh Uttam. The book has been adapted into an award-winning Malayalam drama film titled Artist (2013) written and directed by Shyamaprasad.
