= Autorickshawkarante Bharya =

- Film poster
- Directed by: Harikumar
- Written by: M. Mukundan
- Produced by: KV Abdul Nasser
- Starring: Ann Augustine; Suraj Venjaramoodu
- Cinematography: Alagappan N.
- Edited by: Ayoob Khan
- Music by: Ouseppachan
- Production company: Benzy Productions
- Distributed by: Dream Big Films
- Release date: 28 October 2022
- Country: India
- Language: Malayalam

Autorickshawkarante Bharya (transl. Auto Rickshaw Driver's Wife) is a 2022 Indian Malayalam-language drama film directed by Harikumar. Written by M. Mukundan in his screenplay debut based on the short story by the same name, the film stars Ann Augustine (in her first lead appearance since 2015) and Suraj Venjaramoodu in the titular roles. Produced by KV Abdul Nasser under the banner of Benzy Productions, Autorickshawkarante Bharya features Kailash, Swasika, Janardhanan, Devi Ajith, and Neena Kurup in major supporting roles. Shot by Alagappan N., the soundtrack of the film was composed by Ouseppachan. The film released on 28 October 2022.

== Plot ==
Sajeevan is a lazy Auto Rickshaw driver who marries the "determined" Radhika. Circumstances force Radhika to take up driving the Auto Rickshaw for a living.

== Cast ==
- Ann Augustine as Radhika
- Suraj Venjaramoodu as Sajeevan
- Kailash as Lilly's husband
- Swasika as Lilly teacher
- Janardhanan as French Vasu/ French uncle
- Sunil Sukhada as Kurishu Johny
- Devi Ajith as Sub Inspector
- Neena Kurup as Radhika's mother
- Manohari Joy as Sajeevan's mother

== Production ==
Filming began in December 2021 in Mahé, India, and was wrapped up by February 2022.

== Reception ==
=== Critical reception ===
Princy Alexander of Onmanorama wrote that Autorickshawkarante Bharya storyline "lacks bit of depth." She also noted that the scenes and dialogues feel "old-school" and "look cliched." Except for the song 'Vaadaruthe', the rest of the songs were "not very impressive." The cast performance was mixed. She wrote, "The story lags at parts and the audience has to wait till the final lap of the second half to derive some excitement."

Sanjith Sidhardhan of OTTPlay rated the film 2/5 and wrote, "Autorickshawkkarante Bharya has a story told in the most outdated manner with bland dialogues and ordinary performances from both its lead actors."
