= Roshni Dinaker =

Indian costume designer and filmmaker

- Born: Kodagu district, India
- Occupations: Film director, costume designer
- Years active: 2002–present
- Spouse: Dinaker O. V.
- Children: Adithya,Aarush

== Biography ==
Roshni Dinaker (pronounced: rɔːʃnɪ ðɪnɛkɛr) is an Indian costume designer and filmmaker, who has worked in Kannada, Tamil, and Telugu film industries as designer, and her directorial debut with the Malayalam film My Story in 2018.

== Personal life ==
Dinaker was born in Madikeri, Kodagu district, India as the daughter of Tomy Mathew and Asha Tomy. Her father hails from Ramapuram, Kottayam in Kerala. She was educated in Bangalore. She is married to Dinaker O. V. and have two children—Adithya and Aarush Dinaker.

== Career ==
Dinaker worked in the corporate world before entering the film industry. Dinaker started her career in the film industry as a costume designer in South Indian language films, since 2002. She was inspired by the costume designer Bhanu Athaiya. Her debut as a costume designer was in the Kannada movie Shubham. She won Karnataka State Film Awards as Best Costume Designer (2006–2007) for her work in Kallarali Hoovagi, directed by T. S. Nagabharana. She has worked in more than 50 films as a costume designer. She made her directorial debut with the Malayalam film titled My Story, starring Prithviraj Sukumaran and Parvathy. Filming began on 1 November 2017 in Portugal, and the movie was released on 6 July 2018. Dinaker was also the costume designer and producer of the film.

In 2018, she reported that she was working on a film called Metamorphosis, which is about three women. As of October 2019, Dinaker was directing a Malayalam action film, titled 2 Stroke. She is the first woman in the Malayalam film industry to direct an action film.

== Filmography ==
The following is a non-exhaustive list of films that Dinaker worked on:

| Year | Film | Directed by | Role |
|---|---|---|---|
| 2006 | Kallarali Hoovagi | T.S. Nagabharana | Costume designer |
| 2012 | Chaarulatha | Pon Kumaran | Costume designer |
| 2016 | Yashogathe | Vinod J Raj | Costume designer |
| 2018 | My Story | Roshni Dinaker | Director, producer, Costume designer |
