= Artist (film) =

- Film poster
- Directed by: Shyamaprasad
- Written by: Shyamaprasad
- Based on: Dreams in Prussian Blue; 2010 novel by Paritosh Uttam
- Produced by: M. Mani
- Starring: Fahadh Faasil; Ann Augustine; Sreeram Ramachandran; Sidhartha Siva; Srinda Ashab
- Cinematography: Shamdat Sainudeen
- Edited by: Vinod Sukumaran
- Music by: Bijibal
- Production company: Sunitha Productions
- Distributed by: Sunitha Productions
- Release date: 30 August 2013
- Country: India
- Language: Malayalam

Artist is a 2013 Indian Malayalam-language drama film written and directed by Shyamaprasad. An adaptation of Dreams in Prussian Blue, a paperback novel by Paritosh Uttam, it tells the story of two fine arts students, driven by individual ambitions, who decide to live together. The film traces the course of their relationship and progression as artists.

The film features Fahadh Faasil as Michael and Ann Augustine as Gayathri. The supporting cast includes Sreeram Ramachandran (of the sitcom Chumma on Amrita TV), Sidhartha Siva, Srinda Ashab (Annayum Rasoolum-fame), Krishnachandran, and Vanitha along with a host of newcomers.

The film was produced by M. Mani under his banner, Sunitha Productions. The music was composed by Bijibal and the editing was done by Vinod Sukumaran. The film won three major awards at the Kerala State Film Awards: Best Director, Best Actress (Ann Augustine), and Best Actor (Fahadh Faasil).

== Plot ==
Artist traces the journey of two artists — Michael Agnelo, son of a Goan businessman, and Gayatri, who hails from a conservative Brahmin family. Gayatri shocks her parents by choosing to study Arts in college. She then decides to drop out of college and start living with Michael, an eccentric genius with a promising career. Their new life together does not eradicate her isolation, and as Michael wraps further layers of self-centeredness around the cocoon he has built for himself, Gayatri looks around for ways to keep her passion for him intact. Gayathri is barely out of her teens when she starts working to support her partner even though she does not get any emotional support from him. Her woes increase when Michael loses his eyesight in a road accident. The challenges of the ungrateful Michael who struggles to transform his artistry on the canvas and how the youngsters tackle egoism, selfishness, and their artistic demands form the crux of the story.

== Cast ==
- Fahadh Faasil as Michael
- Ann Augustine as Gayatri
- Sreeram Ramachandran as Abhinav
- Sidhartha Siva as Roy, a curator
- Krishnachandran as Gayatri's father
- Vanitha Krishnachandran as Gayatri's mother
- Srinda Ashab as Ruchi
- Rudran as Surgeon
- Sandeep as Doctor
- Syamala S. Nair as Landlady

== Production ==
=== Novel ===
Artist is an adaptation of the English novel Dreams in Prussian Blue by Paritosh Uttam, a techie-turned-writer who was born in Thiruvananthapuram to UP parents. Paritosh is a graduate of IIT Madras and has a full-time job as a software professional in Pune. Dreams in Prussian Blue was published in 2010. Paritosh Uttam says, "A few months after its release, Shyamaprasad contacted me through my website and said that he had read it and had liked it because the themes it dealt with vibed with his thoughts. He said he would like to make a film based on it. I found out that Shyamaprasad is an acclaimed director and was glad to say yes. We talked over email and phone about how to take this forward. The novel is my work but its adaptation to the screen is fully Shyamaprasad's". Shyamaprasad says that transforming this story narrated in words onto the visual medium was certainly a challenge. The film is set in Kerala in 2013, unlike the book, which had its backdrop in Mumbai in 2010.

=== Filming ===
The film's shooting commenced in February 2013. It was shot completely in Thiruvananthapuram, Kerala, with several scenes set in the College of Fine Arts in the city. Like Shyamaprasad's previous film English: An Autumn in London, Artist was also shot in sync sound. Sohail Sanwari was the sound designer and Shamdat was the cinematographer.

== Reception ==
The film received critical acclaim. Aswin J. Kumar of The Times of India said, "Artist is a well-assembled film, beautifully crafted and portrayed by a stunning cast." Paresh C. Palicha of Rediff.com stated that the film "keeps the viewer intrigued and involved till the very end". He rated the film 3/5 and regarded it as one of Shyamaprasad's best works till date. Veeyen of Nowrunning.com rated the film 3/5 and said, "The soul-stifling experience that Shyamaprasad's 'Artist' is, leads us on to a world of paints and easels, palettes and pastels, where ingenuity and inventiveness flow on, in strokes and flourishes from the tip of a brush. The painterly detail that the director has on offer for us in 'Artist', makes it a visually sumptuous film that engrosses us with its enchanting tale."

== Awards ==
Kerala State Film Awards

- Best Director - Shyamaprasad
- Best Actress - Ann Augustine
- Best Actor - Fahadh Faasil

Filmfare Awards South

- Best Director - Shyamaprasad
- Best Actress - Ann Augustine
