= Wonder Woman (disambiguation) =

Wonder Woman is a DC comic book superhero.

Wonder Woman may also refer to:

== Comics ==
- Wonder Woman (Amalgam Comics)
- Wonder Woman (comic book), comic book series that has run in various forms since 1942
- Wonder Woman (Earth-Two), a DC Comics superheroine
- Artemis of Bana-Mighdall, a DC Comics character who held the title of Wonder Woman
- Hippolyta (DC Comics), Princess Diana's mother, who took her place as Wonder Woman for a time (1997–1998)
- Orana (comics), a DC Comics character who claimed to be Wonder Woman for two issues
- Alternative versions of Wonder Woman

== Film and television ==
- Wonder Woman (1974 film), a television pilot starring Cathy Lee Crosby
- Wonder Woman (TV series), a 1975 television adaptation that starred Lynda Carter
- "Wonder Woman", a 1997 episode of Spin City
- Wonder Woman (2009 film), a direct-to-video animated film starring Keri Russell
- Wonder Woman (2011 TV pilot), an unaired television pilot starring Adrianne Palicki
- Wonder Woman (2017 film), starring Gal Gadot
- Wonder Woman: Bloodlines (2019), a direct-to-video animated film starring Rosario Dawson
- The Wonder Woman, a 2020 Taiwanese television series
- Wonder Woman 1984 (2020 film), a sequel to the 2017 film

== Music ==
- "Wonder Woman" (Namie Amuro song)
- "Wonder Woman" (Kacey Musgraves song)
- "Wonder Woman" (Psychic Fever song)
- "Wonder Woman" (Seeya, Davichi and T-ara song)
- "Wonder Woman" (Trey Songz song)
- Wonder Woman (soundtrack), to the 2017 film
- "Wonder Woman", a 2023 song by Miley Cyrus from Endless Summer Vacation
- "Wonder Woman", a 2023 song by Tenille Arts from To Be Honest

== Roller coasters ==
- Wonder Woman Flight of Courage, at Six Flags Magic Mountain
- Wonder Woman Golden Lasso Coaster, at Six Flags Fiesta Texas

== See also ==
- Wonder Woman 2 (disambiguation)
- Wonder Girl, the alias of multiple superheroines
- Wonder Women (disambiguation)
