= Andhar Bahar =

2013 film by Phaneesh S Ramanathapura

Andar Baahar
- Directed by: Phaneesh S Ramanathapura
- Produced by: Rajanish; Prasad; Ambarish; Avinash; Bhaskar; Srinivas
- Starring: Shiva Rajkumar; Parvathy; Shashikumar; Arundathi Nag
- Cinematography: Shekar Chandru
- Edited by: Jo Ni Harsha
- Music by: Vijay Prakash
- Production company: Legends International
- Release date: 5 April 2013
- Country: India
- Language: Kannada

Andar Baahar (transl. "In and out") is a 2013 Kannada action film starring Shiva Rajkumar and Parvathy in the lead. The film is directed by Phaneesh Ramanathapura and produced by a host of USA Kannadiga friends under the Legends International Group banner. Popular playback singer Vijay Prakash made his debut as a music composer for this film.

The film tells the story of the relationship between a newly married criminal and his wife. The movie ended as a disaster.

== Cast ==
- Shiva Rajkumar as Surya
- Parvathy as Suhasini
- Shashikumar as Patil
- Srinath
- Arundathi Nag
- Raghuram
- Srujan Lokesh
- Spoorthi Suresh
- Raghuram
- Chasva
- Vathsala Mohan
- Sangeetha
- Vijayasarathi

== Soundtrack ==
Andhar Bahar

Soundtrack album by Vijay Prakash
- Released: 2013
- Recorded: 2013
- Genre: Feature film soundtrack
- Length: 21:14
- Language: Kannada

Official audio
- Andhar Bahar - Full Album on YouTube

The soundtrack of the album was released on 10 February 2013. Andhar Bahar consists of five songs composed by singer Vijay Prakash debut as a music director and composer.

Track listing
No.	Title	Singer(s)	Length
1.	"Andar Bahar"	Vishal Dadlani, Suzanne D'Mello	4:08
2.	"Koneye Irada"	Shankar Mahadevan	4:22
3.	"Aasae"	Karthik, Anuradha Bhat	5:04
4.	"Maleyali Minda"	Vijay Prakash, Shreya Ghoshal	4:30
5.	"Ashada Masadali"	Chetan Sosca, Shamita Malnad	3:50
Total length:			21:14

== Reception ==
=== Critical response ===
Srikanth Srinivasa of Rediff.com scored the film at 2 out of 5 stars and says " Director Phaneesh could have put a lot more drama into his narrative. There are some flaws that the audiences can easily spot that could have been avoided. The film is a tad too long with some unnecessary scenes. Andar Bahar is a family entertainer that is a good watch". A critic from The Times of India scored the film at 3.5 out of 5 stars and wrote "Shivrajkumar is a master in both action and sentimental sequences. Parvathi Menon is equally brilliant. Raghuram shines as the hero’s friend. The Srinath-Arundhati Nag pair is disappointing. Shekhar Chandra has captured some lovely frames with his camera. Vijay Prakash has done a good job as music director". A Shardhha of The New Indian Express wrote The Verdict : Hope the other side of Shivarajkumar works wonders with the audience. A must-see for an all round fine performance". B S Srivani from Deccan Herald wrote "Andhar Bahar offers a peek into the conflict and subsequent turmoil inside a soul which influences all our actions. A must-watch for Shivanna, and sensible film, fans". A critic from Bangalore Mirror wrote "There are two star performers in the movie. One, Parvathi Menon, who despite a slight accent that reminds you of Tamil actress Suhasini dubbing in Kannada, gives a brilliant performance which sometimes outdoes even Shiva Rajkumar. The other is cinematographer Shekar Chandru. He is a true magician. The film is good only if you manage to sit through it completely".
