= Dhootha =

2023 Indian TV series

- Genre: Neo noir Crime thriller
- Created by: Vikram K. Kumar
- Written by: Vikram K. Kumar; Venkat D. Pati; Poorna Pragna; Sripal Reddy; Naveen George Thomas; Venkatesh Dondapati
- Directed by: Vikram K. Kumar
- Starring: Naga Chaitanya; Srikanth Murali; Parvathy Thiruvothu; Prachi Desai; Anish Kuruvilla; Tharun Bhascker; Rohini; Tanikella Bharani; Priya Bhavani Shankar; Pasupathy
- Composer: Ishaan Chhabra
- Country of origin: India
- Original language: Telugu
- No. of seasons: 1
- No. of episodes: 8

Production
- Producers: Sharrath Marar; Vikram K. Kumar
- Production location: India
- Cinematography: Mikolaj Sygula
- Editor: Naveen Nooli
- Running time: 43–53 Minutes
- Production company: Northstar Entertainment

Original release
- Network: Amazon Prime Video
- Release: 1 December 2023

Dhootha (transl. Messenger) is an Indian Telugu-language horror mystery thriller television series created and directed by Vikram Kumar. It stars Naga Chaitanya, Parvathy Thiruvothu, Prachi Desai, Gnaneswari Kandregula, Anish Kuruvilla, Tharun Bhascker, Rohini, Tanikella Bharani, Priya Bhavani Shankar, and Pasupathy in primary roles. The series premiered on 1 December 2023 on Amazon Prime Video. In June 2024, it was announced that the series is renewed for a new season.

== Cast ==
- Naga Chaitanya as Sagar Varma Avudhuri, Chief Editor of "Samachar"
- Pasupathy as Konidela Sathya Murthy, a freedom fighter, Founder and Chief Editor of "Dhootha"
- Parvathy Thiruvothu as DCP Kranthi Shenoy
- Ravindra Vijay as SI Ajay Ghosh
- Jayaprakash as Konidela Chandra Murthy, Sathya Murthy's son
- Raja Goutham as Chakrapani Veerula, President of "Praja Vaakku Party" and Bhupati's friend; Raghavayya's opponent and Chakravarthy's grandfather.
- Tharun Bhascker as Bhupati Varma Avudhuri, Sagar's grandfather and Anand's father.
- Jeevan Kumar as SI Ramana Ghosh, Ajay Ghosh's grandfather
- Tanikella Bharani as MLA Raghavayya, DCP Kranthi Shenoy‘s great-grandfather
- Raghu Kunche as Chief Minister Chakravarthy Veerula
- Priya Bhavani Shankar as Priya Avudhuri, Sagar's wife
- Easwari Rao as Raghavayya's granddaughter and Kranthi's mother (in a cameo appearance).
- Prachi Desai as Amrutha, Sagar's PA
- Sruthy Jayan as Kalpana, Raghavayya's maid and Chakrapani's love interest
- Satya Krishnan as Konidela Lakshmi, Sathya Murthy's wife and Chandra Murthy's mother
- Srikant Murali as Charles David, Sagar's friend-turned-foe
- Gnaneswari Kandregula as Kiran Reddy
- Rohini as Madhavi Avudhuri, Sagar's mother
- Anish Kuruvilla as Anand Varma Avudhuri, Sagar's father
- Chaitanya Garikipati as Constable Ranga, Assistant to Kranthi
- Ayush Agarwal as Konidela Sathya, Chandra Murthy's son and Sathya Murthy's grand son; a journalist aspirant.
- Teja Kakumanu as Tapas, Amrutha's husband
- Nalla Sridhar Reddy as Koti, Truck driver
- Kamakshi Bhaskarla as Kala, Koti's wife
- Gururaj Manepalli as Priya's father and Sagar's father-in-law.

== Episodes ==
Series	Episodes	Originally released
1	8	1 December 2023

=== Season 1 (2023) ===
No.	Title	Directed and Written by	Release
1	"The Puzzle" by	Vikram Kumar	1 December 2023
2	"Editorial Cartoon"	Vikram Kumar	1 December 2023
3	"Horoscope"	Vikram Kumar	1 December 2023
4	"Crime Report"	Vikram Kumar	1 December 2023
5	"Page 3"	Vikram Kumar	1 December 2023
6	"This Day, That Year"	Vikram Kumar	1 December 2023
7	"Continued on Page 6"	Vikram Kumar	1 December 2023
8	"Headlines"	Vikram Kumar	1 December 2023
