= My Story (film) =

- Poster
- Directed by: Roshni Dinaker
- Written by: Shanker Ramakrishnan
- Produced by: Dinaker O. V. Roshni Dinaker
- Starring: Prithviraj Sukumaran; Parvathy Thiruvothu; Ganesh Venkatraman; Manoj K. Jayan; Mukul Dev
- Cinematography: Dudley; Vinod Perumal
- Edited by: Priyank Prem Kumar
- Music by: Songs: Shaan Rahman; Background Score: Raja Narayan Deb
- Production company: Roshni Dinaker Productions
- Distributed by: Vaishaka Cynyma
- Release date: 6 July 2018
- Country: India
- Language: Malayalam
- Budget: ₹18 crore
- Box office: ₹2.3 crore

My Story is a 2018 Indian Malayalam-language romance film directed and produced by Roshni Dinaker (in her directorial debut) and written by Shanker Ramakrishnan. The film stars Prithviraj Sukumaran and Parvathy Thiruvothu in the lead roles, with Ganesh Venkatraman, Manoj K. Jayan and Mukul Dev in supporting roles.

It was released on 6 July 2018. This movie received mixed to negative reviews from audience and was a box-office bomb.

== Plot ==
A debutant actor Jay and his co-star Tara, an established actress, and a diva, fall in love on the sets of their film. However, Tara is set to marry David, a wealthy film producer and bureaucrat, who is also the producer of the movie. Twenty years later, Jay is a big movie star but is still in love with Tara and decides to travel to Lisbon to apologize to her for something he did in the past. In the end, Jay finds that he has a daughter with Tara and that she has been also living a dual life with her husband pining over Jay.

== Cast ==
- Prithviraj Sukumaran as Jay a.k.a. Jayaram
  - Jayaditya Kang as young Jay
- Parvathy Thiruvothu in dual roles
  - Tara
  - Hima, Jai and Tara's daughter
- Mukul Dev as Sunil
- Ganesh Venkatraman as David Eapen
- Arun V. Narayan as Sidharth/Bonie
- Nandu as Joseph Silva
- Manoj K. Jayan as Williams
- Maniyanpilla Raju as Vishwan
- Nassar as Keshava Perumaal (Cameo)
- Bhadran as Himself (Cameo)
- Sona Heiden as Dancemaster

== Production ==
The film marks the directorial debut of film costume designer Roshni Dinaker. Principal photography commenced on 1 November 2016 in Portugal. The filming began on the same date she started her career as a designer years ago. The film was shot in Óbidos and Lisbon, Portugal over 45 days. It was filmed by cinematographer Dudley, Bishwadeep Chatterjee is the sound designer. Roshni also produced the film with her husband O. V. Dinaker. She came up with the plot of My Story after a friend of her named Abhijata Umesh narrated her a story. Impressed by it, she had a discussion with Shankar Ramakrishnan and developed a new story-line, which became the plot of My Story. The title of the film My Story was the name of the hotel where the writer Ramakrishnan stayed during location scouting in Portugal. Prithviraj also agreed on the title. The film was made on a budget of ₹18 crore.

== Soundtrack ==
The songs were composed by Shaan Rahman, with lyrics written by B. K. Harinarayanan. The soundtrack album consists of 7 tracks, released by the label Vibe Music.

No.	Title	Singer(s)	Length
1.	"Pathungi"	Benny Dayal, Manjari	3:25
2.	"Kadhalkal"	Shaan Rahman	3:56
3.	"Mizhi Mizhi"	Shreya Ghoshal, Haricharan	3:48
4.	"Mayamanjeleri"	Shakthisree Gopalan	4:15
5.	"Kozhiyumo"	Harib Hussain	5:08
6.	"Aaranu Nee"	Harib Hussain, Megha Josekutty	4:37
7.	"Aaranu Nee Remix"	Harib Hussain, Megha Josekutty	4:47

== Release ==
My Story was released on 6 July 2018.

=== Reception ===
Sajin Shrijith from The New Indian Express, who rated 3 in a scale of 5 found the film's narration interesting, yet few portions "needlessly stretched". "She [Dinaker] isn't interested in winning awards; she is only interested in providing you with two hours of guilty-free entertainment", he wrote. Ayyappan R. of Malayala Manorama wrote: "being a long-term love story it oscillates so much between time zones making you so giddy ... Yet, despite the zig-zagness of the form, the film moves at a smooth languid, almost dreamy, pace, befitting a mature love story". He praised the performances of Prithviraj and Parvathy, editing and colour grading. T. Nirmalkumar of Mathrubhumi rated 3 out of 5 and praised the lead performances, particularly Parvathy's, and said the film "demonstrates the craft which is not of a debutante. It is a love story portrayed on a colourful and unique canvas. But, the engaging first half storytelling is followed by a cliche flashback which made it an ordinary story".

Priya Sreekumar of the Deccan Chronicle appreciated the performances of Prithviraj and Parvathy, cinematography, costumes, sound and music department, but was critical about the screenplay, and rated 2.5 out of 5 stars. Asha Prakash of The Times of India rated 2.5 out of 5 stars. She appreciated the performances of Prithviraj and Parvathy, visuals and music, but felt that the film had too much cinematic cliches. The Indian Express reviewer Manoj Kumar R. had the impression that Jay's characterization was unconvincing and his "repugnant personality" was "sugarcoated" by the filmmaker. He rated 2 out of 5 stars. Sowmya Rajendran of The News Minute praised Prithviraj and Parvathy's performances, at the same time, said the characters suffer from unequal writing.
