= Passenger (2009 film) =

- Theaterical poster
- Directed by: Ranjith Sankar
- Written by: Ranjith Sankar
- Produced by: S. C. Pillai
- Starring: Sreenivasan; Dileep; Mamta Mohandas; Jagathy Sreekumar; Nedumudi Venu
- Cinematography: P. Sukumar
- Edited by: Ranjan Abraham
- Music by: Bijibal
- Distributed by: Central Pictures
- Release date: 7 May 2009
- Running time: 118 minutes
- Country: India
- Language: Malayalam
- Budget: ₹1.6 crores

Passenger is a 2009 Indian Malayalam-language conspiracy thriller film written and directed by debutant Ranjith Sankar and starring Sreenivasan, Dileep, Mamta Mohandas, Jagathy Sreekumar and Nedumudi Venu in major roles. It was a path breaker in Malayalam cinema in terms of its story telling and started the Malayalam new cinema wave. Owing to its critical and commercial success, Passenger was to be remade into Tamil as Muriyadi by Selva.

== Plot ==
Passenger is based on two characters, who have never had anything to do with each other, and the impact they cause on each other's lives. The movie shows the events that follow.

Sathyanathan, who works in a private company, is a simple man who lives an orderly and uncomplicated life. He travels from his native town to Kochi (where he works) by train. The moment the train crosses the Chalakudy bridge he dozes off and wakes up at another station. He is someone who fights for social justices for the benefit of everyone and shirks from any publicity gained by it.

Nandhan Menon is an advocate and his wife Anuradha is a reporter who works for private news channel Right TV.

Maranchara is a small coastal village. A private company has been awarded rights to mine nuclear fuel from the coast in Maranchara by Home Minister Thomas Chacko. There is a political sex scandal and a legal battle within which Minister Chacko, Nandhan Menon, Anuradha Nandan and Thankamma (a local leader) are involved. The plot takes a turn when Anuradha obtains a video clip of the minister collaborating with police and corporates. They plan to kill innocent people who are occupying land with potential mineral resources by staging a plane crash. Nandhan is kidnapped by gangsters working for the minister to lure Anuradha into returning the video.

By sheer coincidence, Sathyanathan gets involved. Unlike normal bystanders, he and Driver Nair decide to join the couple in the fight to save the people of Maranchara, Nandhan Menon and Anuradha. They team up and decide to show the video clip to the Chairman of Right TV, where Anuradha is working. When it is telecasted via their channel, all the play and decision of Minister fails and he is dismissed. Nandhan sends an SMS to Anuradha where he is held hostage. But Anuradha has already gone to her office with her co-workers, sent by the chairman. Sathyanathan gets the SMS sent to Anuradha's phone (she forgets the phone in backseat of taxi). As informed by Nandhan in SMS, driver drops Sathyanathan to Aluva railway station and the driver leaves without charging him. Sathyanathan catches the passenger train and reaches the location, pulls the chain and gets down and seen Nandhan and takes him to the hospital. With no other word said or heard, he leaves the hospital. Later that night, he reaches home and switches on the TV in which he see the interview with Mr. and Mrs Nandhan Menon thanking him, the person unknown to them. The next morning, Sathyanathan resumes with his daily life.

== Cast ==
- Sreenivasan as Sathyanathan
- Dileep as Advocate Nandhan Menon
- Mamta Mohandas as Anuradha Nandhan
- Jagathy Sreekumar as Home Minister Thomas Chacko
- Nedumudi Venu as Driver Nair
- Lakshmi Sharma as Gayathri
- Madhu as Balan Kurup, Right TV Chairman
- Harisree Ashokan as Varghese, Sathyanathan's friend
- Manikuttan as Sudheendran
- Anandsami as Anali Shaji
- Sreejith Ravi as Sunny
- Anoop Chandran as Unni, Sathyanathan's friend
- Kochu Preman as Jaffer, Sathyanathan's friend
- T. P. Madhavan as Thankappan, Sathyanathan's friend
- Sona Nair as Thankamma Rajan
- Shivaji Guruvayoor as Ajayan, Station Master
- Manikandan Pattambi as Minister's assistant
- Anandkumar as Alex Koshy
- Valsala Menon as Sathyanathan's mother
- Lishoy as D.G.P. Alexander
- Saju. V. J. as Circle Inspector Baby
- Jobi Moothedathu as Sivan
- Pala Aravindan as M.D.
- Sibi Kuruvila as Sajan
- Master Vineet Vinayaka as Sathyanathan's son
- Nilambur Ayisha as Nasibu Umma
- Shandy as Journalist
- Revathy as Sathyanathan's daughter
- Krishna Praba as receptionist

== Awards ==
Lohithadas Puraskaram for Best Screenplay

The film won the first Lohithadas Puraskaram for Best Screenplay, an award to commemorize screenwriter A.K. Lohithadas.

Dubai AMMA Awards

- Best Socially Committed movie
- Best Debut director - Ranjith Sankar
- Best Villain - Jagathy Sreekumar

Asianet Film Awards

- Best Character Actor - Sreenivasan
- Best screenplay - Ranjith Sankar

Kerala Film Critics Award

- Best Popular movie
- Special Jury Award for direction - Ranjith Sankar

Vanitha Nippon Awards

- Best Villain - Jagathy Sreekumar

Mathrubhumi Amritha Awards

- Most Popular actor - Sreenivasan

World Malayali Council - Kairali Awards

- Best Screenplay - Ranjith Sankar

Surya TV Awards

- Best Debut director - Ranjith Sankar
- Best Villain - Jagathy Sreekumar

V. Santharam Awards

- Best Debut director (Nomination)

Filmfare Awards

- Best Director (Nomination)
- Best Actress (Nomination)

Jaihind Awards

Best Villain - Jagathy Sreekumar

SouthScope Awards

- Best Director (Nomination)
- Best Actress (Nomination)

== Soundtrack ==
The soundtrack of Passenger, features one song which is the theme song of the movie, is composed by Bijibal and sung by Vineeth Sreenivasan

SL No.	Song	Performer
1	Ormathirivil kandu marannoru	Vineeth Sreenivasan

== Box office ==
The film was superhit at box-office.
