= Puzhu =

2022 film directed by Ratheena

- Official release poster
- Directed by: Ratheena PT
- Written by: Harshad; Suhas-Sharfu
- Story by: Harshad
- Produced by: S. George
- Starring: Mammootty; Appunni Sasi; Parvathy
- Cinematography: Theni Eswar
- Edited by: Deepu S. Joseph
- Music by: Jakes Bejoy
- Production companies: Wayfarer Films; Cyn-Cyl Celluloid
- Distributed by: SonyLIV
- Release date: 13 May 2022
- Running time: 115 minutes
- Country: India
- Language: Malayalam

Puzhu (lit. 'Worm') is a 2022 Indian Malayalam-language psychological drama film directed by debutante Ratheena and jointly written by Harshad and Suhas-Sharfu. The film stars Mammootty, Appunni Sasi and Parvathy Thiruvothu in the lead roles. Cinematography of the film is handled by Theni Eswar and the film score and songs are composed by Jakes Bejoy.

Principal photography began on 17 August 2021 in Ernakulam, Kerala. The film was scheduled to release in theatres in the first half of 2022. Later, it was released on streaming on SonyLIV. It premiered on 12 May 2022. The film received mixed reviews from critics, with praise for Mammootty's performance but criticized its story, writing, concept and screenplay.

== Plot ==
Kuttan is a high-ranking IPS officer and a widower who belongs to a Brahmin community and stays in a luxury flat along with his son, Kichu. Kuttan is an irritable, provokable and hot tempered man who completely avoids someone whose behaviour is annoying, irritating or provocative to him especially when it comes to some young women or young girls and he does not give a thought or consideration about what other people think. He is somewhat a complete introvert who has only a small circle of close friends and acquaintances and does not like to socialize too much. His somewhat overprotective nature and authoritative methods suffocate Kichu, who wishes his father to die. Kuttan starts to feel that someone is trying to kill him and is suspicious of everyone around him except his friends and close ones whom he trusts. His paranoia is accentuated when his younger sister, Bharati, comes to stay in a nearby flat along with her theatre artist husband, Kuttappan. Kuttan shares a problematic relationship with Bharati, as she had eloped with Kuttappan, who is from an oppressed caste. Kuttan's hatred and bigotry result in him unleashing his rage and losing his sanity.

== Cast ==
- Mammootty as Kuttan, an IPS officer
- Appunni Sasi as Kuttappan a.k.a. KP
- Parvathy as Bharathi, Kuttan's estranged sister
- Vasudev Sajeesh as Kichu
- Nedumudi Venu as Mohan/Mohanettan, Kuttan's Neighbour
- Athmiya Rajan as Radhika, Kuttan's wife
- Kunchan as Paul Varghese
- Malavika Menon as Bharathi's friend
- Indrans as Mathachan
- Vishnu G Raghav
- Sreedevi Unni as Mohan's wife
- Kottayam Ramesh as Hari, Kuttan's family friend
- Manohari Joy as Kuttan's mother
- Prasanth Alexander as Jamal, Kuttan's friend
- Thejas EK as Ameer
- V. P. Khalid as Security Guard

== Production ==
=== Development ===
On 8 March 2021 (Working Women's Day), makers announced the film through social media by sharing the title poster.

The audience will be shocked to see the kind of character Mammootty is playing in ‘Puzhu’. It is a kind of character he has never played before. And it is a film that aligns with the kind of political thoughts and gender politics I believe in.

— Parvathy Thiruvothu, The Cue

Puzhu is a debut direction of Ratheena who has previously worked as the executive producer of Parvathy-starrer Uyare, aside from associating with filmmakers such as Revathi. The film was to be produced by S. George under the banner Cyn-Cyl Celluloid and distributed by Dulquer Salmaan's home banner Wayfarer Films. Deepu Joseph was announced as the editor while Manu Jagadh was in charge of the art department. Vishnu Govind and Sree Shankar of Sound Factor were to be working on the sound design. Veteran production controller Badusha was roped in with Renish Abdulkhader, Rajesh Krishna, and Shyam Mohan as executive producers.

=== Filming ===
Principal photography began on 17 August 2021 with a switch-on ceremony held at Ernakulam, Kerala. Mammootty joined the sets of the film on 10 September 2021. A first look poster of the film was released on 18 September 2021. On 15 October 2021, Mammootty informed the completion of shoot by sharing a group photo with the crew members through his social media account.

== Release ==
Puzhu was scheduled to release in theatres in the first half of 2022. Later, It was announced that the film would be skipping the theatrical release and option for a direct-to-digital release. Puzhu had its world premiere on SonyLIV on 12 May 2022 in Malayalam, Hindi, Kannada, Tamil and Telugu languages.

== Reception ==
In a review rating it 4 out of 5 stars, Anna M. M. Vetticad of Firstpost wrote, “Puzhu's flaws cannot be taken lightly, yet the film is stunning for so many reasons, making Ratheena one of the most significant voices to emerge from Indian cinema in recent years." Anna M. M. Vetticad ranked it seventh on her year-end list of best Malayalam films on Firstpost. Manoj Kumar R of The Indian Express rated it 4 out of 5 stars and wrote that the film "Puzhu distinguishes itself from other movies that examine the dehumanizing effects of the caste system by being completely non-judgemental. Mammootty is a revelation. If not for the camera's power to capture the minute details of faces, the hatred that Mammootty showcases with the little twitch of his eyes and lips would have escaped our naked eyes. Mammootty delivers a moving performance as a man with a questionable and even condemnable worldview".

The Hindu's S. R. Praveen reviewed that "Mammootty's menacing presence anchors this important debut film with few failings" and added "It is always a joy to see superstars breaking out of the tiresome mould that they have been caught in for years, and rediscovering their sparkling abilities which endeared them to the audience in the first place". The News Minute in its review said, "Ratheena, the director, could not have made a better debut", adding that "Another plot device that seems to distract you from the otherwise captivating script is the overuse of theatre. Drama trying to be too dramatic, years after theatre found new pathways. But Puzhu is still going to disturb you, a lot, as it is supposed to. Vishnu Muraleedharan of Malayala Manorama wrote "It seems like Mammootty has found his calling in scripts that have its base in Mahabharata and we are not complaining. The veteran actor has performed like a dream in Puzhu." Calling the film a "disturbing mystery thriller", Kerala Kaumudi wrote that "despite its flaws, Puzhu definitely marks an exceptional directorial debut."
