= Elsamma Enna Aankutty =

- Directed by: Lal Jose
- Written by: M Sindhuraj
- Produced by: M. Renjith
- Starring: Kunchacko Boban; Ann Augustine; Indrajith Sukumaran
- Cinematography: Vijay Ulaganath
- Edited by: Ranjan Abraham
- Music by: Rajamani
- Production company: Rejaputhra Visual Media
- Distributed by: Lal Creations
- Release date: 9 September 2010
- Country: India
- Language: Malayalam
- Budget: ₹1.75 crore (US$180,000)
- Box office: ₹4 crore (US$420,000)

Elsamma Enna Aankutty (transl. A Boy Called Elsamma) is a 2010 Malayalam-language romantic comedy film directed by Lal Jose and written by M. Sindhuraj starring Kunchacko Boban Ann Augustine, Indrajith Sukumaran. The film was produced by Rejaputhra Visual Media and distributed by Lal Creations.

== Plot ==
The setting of the story is a picturesque village in the high ranges of Kerala, called Balanpillai City. Elsamma is the eldest of four daughters of Maria Varkey. After her father's death, she started working as a newspaper agent/local reporter/delivery girl to earn extra income. Sankaranunni, alias Palunni, is a milkman and close friend of Elsamma who never revealed his love towards her. Kunnel Paappan and Elsamma's family share close ties, almost like one family. Elsamma is also a staunch activist who wants to close down the local toddy shop run by a strongman Sugunan. This brings her into regular conflict with him as well as the Panchayat member Ramanan.

Paalunni confides his love for Elsamma to Paappan who promises to convey this to Elsamma when the time is right. Paappan's daughter-in-law passes away and his grandchildren Aby and his sister Sherin come to live with their grandparents in Balanpillai City. Aby is attracted to Elsamma and tries to flirt with her, hoping to have sex with her. Sherin dislikes her and is rude to her.

Sugunan calls Aby and his friends who are visiting the village and urges them to entrap Elsamma and her sisters and create disrepute so that Elsamma would leave his illicit liquor business alone. Aby tells Paappan and Maria that he wants to marry Elsamma. A wedding is arranged without Elsamma's knowledge or consent, and Paappan could not object, in spite of knowing that Paalunni likes Elsamma. Paalunni tearfully accepts the situation keeping in mind Elsamma and family's long-term well-being. Elsamma later catches Jerry, one of Aby's friends, in a compromising position with Aby's sister Sherin. She informs Aby of this through Paalunni. When Aby learns of this, he thrashes Jerry. In retaliation, Jerry discloses that Aby's proposal to marry Elsamma was only his last straw to get her after she had been turning down his advances. Aby's sister, pained upon knowing that Jerry did not love her but was only flirting with her, attempts to commit suicide but is saved in time. She apologises to Elsamma for having been consistently rude to her and they reconcile. Elsamma later forgives Aby but pleasantly turns down his proposal. Aby and his sister are taken to Dubai by their father, who promises to Paappan that they will return as better individuals. The movie ends with Elsamma also telling Paalunni that she loves him.

== Cast ==
- Kunchacko Boban as Palunni
- Ann Augustine as Elsamma Varkey
- Indrajith Sukumaran as Aby George
- Nedumudi Venu as Kunnel Pappan
- Janardhanan as Balanpillai
- Vijayaraghavan as Karippalli Sugunan
- Jagathy Sreekumar as Member Ramanan
- Maniyanpilla Raju as S.I. Sunandhppan
- Suraj Venjaramood as Broker Thommachen
- Manikuttan as Jerry
- Sarath as Hari
- Prakash as Kunnel George
- Balachandran Chullikadu as Doctor Stephen Tharakan
- Majeed as Fr. Thomas
- Subeesh as Cleetus
- Master Abhinav as Suresh
- K.P.A.C.Lalitha as Maria Varkey, Elsamma's mother
- Vani Kishore as Tresa Varkey, Elsamma's Younger sister
- Unnimaya as Leena Varkey, Elsamma's Younger sister
- Shaalin as Jessy Varkey, Elsamma's youngest sister
- Mrudula Murali as Sherine George
- Seema G. Nair as Omana
- Sreedevi Unni as Sharadamma, Palunni's mother
- Geetha Nair as Deenamma
- Subi Suresh as Zainaba
- Thodupuzha Vasanthi as Mary Teacher
- Jeeja Surendran as Rajamma, Panchayat Secretary
- Kavitha as Baby Suresh's mother, Deepa
- Meera Nandan as Jenny (Cameo Appearance)

== Soundtrack ==
The film's soundtrack is composed by C. Rajamani. Lyrics are penned by Rafeeq Ahammed.

No.	Title	Artist(s)	Length
1.	"Kannadi Chirakulla"	Achu Rajamani, Rimi Tomy	3:36
2.	"Ithile Thozhi"	Vijay Yesudas, Swetha Mohan	4:59
3.	"Kannaram Pothi Pothi"	Sithara, Reshmi	3:55
4.	"Aamodamaai"	V. Devanand, Achu Rajamani	3:30
5.	"Ithile"	Achu Rajamani	4:58

== Reception ==
A critic from Rediff.com wrote that "All in all, Elsamma Enna Aankutty cannot be termed as Lal Jose's best work but it carries his stamp nonetheless". A critic from The New Indian Express wrote that "Though the film does not belong to the absolute killer league, it has nothing new to offer, not even a new formula for melodrama".

== Box office ==
The movie started slowly, shifted gears and had a smooth 100 day run in the cities becoming one of the major hits of 2010. Sify declared the film as a "super hit" and added that "the film will do Rs 3 crore from theatricals." The film collected more than ₹4 crore (US$420,000) according to The Hindu.

== Home video ==
The film was released on DVD by Central Home Entertainment in India, on 7 April 2011. Speed Audios released the overseas version DVD on the very next day.
