= Ann Augustine =

Indian film actress

- Born: Anate Augustine; 30 July 1989 (age 37); Kozhikode district, Kerala
- Occupation: Actress
- Years active: 2010-present
- Spouse: Jomon T. John (m. 2014; div. 2021)
- Parent: Augustine (father)

Anate "Ann" Augustine (born 30 July 1989) is an Indian actress who appears in Malayalam films. The daughter of actor Augustine, she made her acting debut in Elsamma Enna Aankutty (2010). Ann is best known for her performance in Artist (2013), which won her the Kerala State Film Award for Best Actress and Filmfare Award for Best Actress – Malayalam.

== Early life and education ==
Ann Augustine was born in Calicut to veteran actor Augustine and Hancy Augustine. Ann did her early part of school in Presentation Higher Secondary School in Calicut and later in Sacred Heart School. In 2010, she graduated in psychology from Kristu Jayanti College, Bengaluru. Later, she completed her post-graduation in Psychology from Jain University, Bengaluru.

== Career ==
She started her acting career during her final year of graduation with Lal Jose's 2010 film Elsamma Enna Aankutty where she played the title role. The film was a commercial success and her performance was highly appreciated by critics. Ann is best known for playing Gayatri, an art student in the 2013 film Artist opposite Fahadh Faasil. The film was a box office success and won her several awards. Paresh C. Palicha of Rediff.com called her the "scene stealer".

== Personal life ==
Ann Augustine married cinematographer Jomon T. John on 2 February 2014. They divorced in 2021. For a time after her marriage, she took a break from acting, and resumed in 2015 with Nee-Na.

== Filmography ==
=== As actor ===
Key
†	Denotes films that have not yet been released

Year	Title	Role	Notes
2010	Elsamma Enna Aankutty	Elsamma	Debut film
2011	Arjunan Saakshi	Anjali Menon	
2011	Three Kings	Ranju	
2012	Ordinary	Anna	
2012	Vaadhyar	Hema	
2012	Friday	Jincy	
2012	Poppins	Anne	
2012	Da Thadiya	Anne Mary Thadikkaran	
2013	Rebecca Uthup Kizhakkemala	Rebecca Uthup	
2013	SIM	Pooja	
2013	Artist	Gayathri	Kerala State Film Award for Best Actress 2013; Filmfare Award for Best Actress – Malayalam
2015	Nee-Na	Nalini	
2017	Solo	Annie	Malayalam-Tamil Bilingual movie Segment : World of Rudra
2022	Autorickshawkarante Bharya	Radhika	
2025	Paathirathri	Yasmin	
2026	Prathichaya	Nisha Chandrakumar	

== As producer ==
- 2024 - Abbabba - Kannada movie
- 2023 - Enkilum Chandrike - Malayalam movie

== Television ==
Year	Title	Role(s)	Language	Notes	Ref.
2024	Manorathangal	Margaret	Malayalam	Segment : Kadalkkaattu	
