= Wonder Women (2022 film) =

- Promotional release poster
- Directed by: Anjali Menon
- Screenplay by: Anjali Menon
- Produced by: Ronnie Screwvala; Ashi Dua Sara
- Starring: Nadiya Moidu; Nithya Menen; Padmapriya Janakiraman; Parvathy Thiruvothu; Sayanora Philip; Archana Padmini; Amruta Subhash
- Cinematography: Manesh Madhavan
- Edited by: Praveen Prabhakar
- Music by: Govind Vasantha
- Production companies: RSVP Movies; Flying Unicorn Entertainment; Little Films
- Distributed by: SonyLIV
- Release date: 18 November 2022
- Running time: 80 minutes
- Country: India
- Language: English

Wonder Women is a 2022 Indian English-language film directed by Anjali Menon and produced by Ronnie Screwvala and Ashi Dua Sara, starring Nadiya Moidu, Nithya Menen, Parvathy Thiruvothu, Padmapriya Janakiraman, Sayanora Philip, Archana Padmini and Amruta Subhash in the lead roles.

The film started streaming on 18 November through SonyLIV. Although the film was predominantly in English, it also featured dialogue in different languages due to the diverse backgrounds of its characters.

== Premise ==
Five pregnant ladies come to stay at 'Sumana', a prenatal class conducted by Nandita. She calls them as ‘Real superheroes’ as they get ready to embrace motherhood. In their quest to know the new life, they discover their true identity and the answers to their deep-rooted problems.

"The film is about ordinary women who journey together and it is only when they stand up for each other that they become 'Wonder Women'. Pregnancy is a lens through which the story of empathy and sisterhood is told. The intent is not to glorify pregnancy or motherhood but to look at how much empowerment is needed in these areas and how much women can do to help one another. Human rights in childbirth and reproductive freedoms are far more important than the attention it receives.“ says Anjali Menon

== Cast ==
- Nadiya Moidu as Nandita
- Nithya Menen as Nora Joseph
- Parvathy Thiruvothu as Mini
- Padmapriya Janakiraman as Veni
- Sayanora Philip as Saya
- Archana Padmini as Gracy
- Amruta Subhash as Jaya
- Radha Gomaty as Veni's mother in law
- Nilambur Ayisha as Mini's grandmother
- Dr. Haris Saleem as Sanjay, Nora's partner
- Srikanth K. Vijayan as Bala, Veni's partner
- Praveen Premnath as Jojo, Saya's partner
- Ajayan Adat as Kannan, Gracy's partner
- Sandesh Kulkarni as Umesh, Jaya's partner
- Remya Sarvada Das as yoga instructor
- P. V. Aakash Mahesh as Adi
- Jamalayisha Bava as Adi's mother
- Vishak Nair as Doctor
- Nadur Prakash as Veni's father in law

== Production ==
The makers announced the film with a peculiar campaign where the star cast took to their social media handles with a picture of a positive pregnancy kit, followed by a conversational video reel, in character, where they spoke about various facets of pregnancy.

== Reception ==
=== Critical reception ===
The film received mixed reviews from audience.

From The Hindu, Shilpa Nair Anand wrote that the story of a group of women attending a prenatal class "will leave you feeling warm" and described it as "an honest, refreshing and ‘unfilmy’ take on a woman’s pregnancy whether planned, unplanned, unwanted, or assisted."

Anna M. M. Vetticad of Firstpost, criticised the film stating that "A star-led ensemble cast is stuck in an amateurish, stereotype-ridden film that has an odd understanding of inclusiveness and shuns the cultural rootedness Malayalam cinema is admired for".

The Indian Express, remarked "It seems as if Anjali Menon has reached a plateau in her ability to psychoanalyse the problems of modern city dwellers. She repeats the obvious facts about human suffering and deliverance, with little to no perception."
