= Uyare =

2019 Indian Malayalam-language drama film

- Theatrical release poster
- Directed by: Manu Ashokan
- Screenplay by: Bobby–Sanjay
- Produced by: Shenuga; Shegna; Sherga
- Starring: Parvathy Thiruvothu; Asif Ali; Tovino Thomas
- Cinematography: Mukesh Muraleedharan
- Edited by: Mahesh Narayanan
- Music by: Gopi Sundar
- Production companies: SCube Films; Grihalakshmi Productions
- Distributed by: Kalpaka Films; Indywood Distribution Network
- Release date: 26 April 2019
- Running time: 125 minutes
- Country: India
- Language: Malayalam

Uyare (transl. Up Above) is a 2019 Indian Malayalam-language drama thriller film directed by Manu Ashokan (in his directorial debut), written by Bobby & Sanjay and produced by the sister-trio Shenuga, Shegna, and Sherga. The film stars Parvathy Thiruvothu, Asif Ali and Tovino Thomas with Siddique, Anarkali Marikar and Prathap Pothen in supporting roles. The story follows the life of Pallavi Raveendran (Parvathy), an aviation student who survives an acid attack that jeopardizes her career. Filming that began in November 2018 was completed by the end of January 2019.

Uyare was released in India on 26 April 2019. It received widespread critical acclaim and was a major Malayalam box office success of the year. It was nominated for the Best Debut Feature Film of a director at the 50th International Film Festival of India (IFFI), held from 20 to 28 November 2019. It was included in The Hindu's top 25 Malayalam films of the decade and is widely regarded as one of the defining movies of the New Wave Movement.

== Plot ==
Pallavi Raveendran's ambition is to become a pilot. She gets admission into a pilot training center in Mumbai. Her busy schedule causes her to clash with her toxic boyfriend Govind Balakrishnan's demanding nature. After he pressures her to abandon her classes and insults her in front of her friends, she angrily tells him to get out of her life. Next morning, Govind tries to speak with Pallavi but she refuses. In anger, Govind throws acid on her face, causing serious disfiguration. As her eyesight is affected by the injuries, her flight license is revoked.

Govind is arrested, but the case is dismissed for lack of evidence. Pallavi returns home, but her friend at the academy requests her to accompany her on a flight for moral support. She meets Vishal Rajashekharan, an influential and charismatic businessman who is also the son of the airline's owner, on the flight. She has to move to another seat when a mother complains that Pallavi's disfigured face is scaring her child. Vishal tries to tell her that she can be anything she wants, but she shuts him down.

After the flight, Vishal decides to take up the challenge and puts forward the idea of hiring her as cabin crew. His father turns down the idea, but Vishal announces his decision to hire an acid-attack survivor at a press conference, giving his father no way to back out. Vishal calls her, expecting her to be grateful, but she is furious with him for publicizing her story without her consent. Afterwards, her father convinces her to give him a chance and she agrees, training as an air hostess.

On her first flight, she is given a hug by a passenger, which comforts her amongst the stares of other passengers. Vishal starts developing feelings for her and confesses them. Pallavi turns him down saying she treasures his friendship and does not want to ruin it by romanticizing it. On her next flight, Govind boards as a passenger and tries to talk to her. He asks her to withdraw her complaint since the social stigma that comes with it will ruin his future. An angry Pallavi throws a glass of cold water on his face. After landing, Govind files a complaint against her. Vishal asks her to apologize, but she refuses, saying that she will react the same way if such an incident happens again. Vishal is forced to sack her, and gives her notice. Enraged at Govind’s audacity, that night, Pallavi's father severely beats Govind up.

The next day, the captain of Pallavi's flight collapses. The co-pilot is inexperienced and panics. Pallavi takes control of the flight, although she is still unable to see in one eye. Over the protests of the control tower, she lands the flight safely. Govind attempts suicide when he realizes that the verdict of the case will be unfavorable for him, and ends up in critical condition, his fate unknown.

On the morning of her last flight, Pallavi meets Vishal and thanks him for giving her an opportunity to fly a plane at least once in her life. During the flight, a boy thanks her for saving his father, who had been on the affected flight. Pallavi is surprised to see most of the passengers present were in the affected flight. Vishal is also seen with them.

== Cast ==
- Parvathy Thiruvothu as Pallavi Raveendran
  - Evelin as Young Pallavi
- Asif Ali as Govind Balakrishnan
- Tovino Thomas as Vishal Rajashekaran
- Siddique as Raveendran, Pallavi's Father
- Anarkali Marikar as Sariya D'Costa, Pallavi's Friend
- Prathap Pothen as Senior Air Traffic Controller
- Prem Prakash as Balakrishnan Nair, Govind's Father
- Rajani Murali as Govind's Mother
- Preetha Pradeep as Pallavi's Elder Sister
- Bhagath Manuel as Abhi, Pallavi's Brother-In-Law
- Rajkumar as Jayaseelan
- Sreeram Ramachandran as Deepak
- Samyuktha as Tessa (cameo appearance)
- Arun Baby Mathew as Avinash
- Anil Murali as Haridas, Pallavi's Advocate
- Irshad as Ashokan, Govind's Advocate
- Sudev Nair as Prathap
- Krishnakumar Menon as Vijay
- Blessy Kurien as Air Hostess
- Binu Pappu as Pilot
- Diwakar Dhayani as Instructor Classroom
- Lakshmika Sajeevan as Air Hostess
- Nasser Latif as Judge
- Suja Paris Long as Ophthalmologist
- Rithu Manthra

== Production ==
=== Development ===
Manu started as an assistant director to Rajesh Pillai. While working in Pillai's Traffic in 2011, Manu interacted with its writers Bobby & Sanjay. According to Manu, it was two years ago that Bobby & Sanjay asked him if he would like to direct a story they have written based on an acid attack survivor. After Pillai's death in 2016, Manu was looking to direct a film himself. Bobby & Sanjay agreed to develop the subject into a script. The film was produced by sisters Sherga, Shegna, and Shenuga—daughters of producer P. V. Gangadharan—under the company S Cube Films.

Early on, the makers decided on Parvathy Thiruvothu for the leading role. She agreed, and used a prosthetic make-up to create the appearance of the acid burn. She had to wear this four hours prior to the shooting, and used the prosthetic make-up for almost 70 percent of the film. On the challenges of doing the role, Parvathy said: "this is the kind of trauma one cannot ever relate to unless a person goes through it. The nervousness of not ever knowing if I am capturing their pain, confusion and trauma in the right way was always there. No matter how many survivors that you speak to, the trauma cannot be internalised".

=== Filming ===
Filming that began in November 2018 was completed by the end of January 2019. It was shot in Kochi and Dhule. Part of the film was shot at Sheroes Hangout in Agra, a cafe run by acid attack survivors. Prosthetic makeup was done by Zuby Johal and Rajiv Subba of Dirty Hands Studio, a Bangalore-based makeup effects and FX company. Uyare was their first Malayalam film.

== Soundtrack ==
Uyare

Soundtrack album by Gopi Sunder
- Genre: Feature film soundtrack
- Length: 11:08
- Language: Malayalam
- Label: Manorama Music

Gopi Sunder chronology
Argentina Fans Kaattoorkadavu (2018)	Uyare (2019)	Ulta (2019)

The music of the film was composed by Gopi Sundar while the lyrics were written by Rafeeq Ahammed.

Track listing
No.	Title	Singer(s)	Length
1.	"Pathinettu Vayassilu"	Christa Kala	2:10
2.	"Nee Mukilo"	Vijay Yesudas, Sithara	3:28
3.	"Kaattil Veezha"	Shakthisree Gopalan	5:30
Total length:			11:08

== Release ==
The first look poster of Uyare was released on 27 February 2019, featuring Parvathy. The trailer of the movie was released on 17 April 2019. The film was released on 26 April 2019. It was the first Malayalam film and second Indian film to be released in South Korea. The film was screened at the International Children's Film Festival of Kerala (ICFFK). It was nominated for the Best Debut Feature Film of a director at the 50th International Film Festival of India (IFFI), held from 20 to 28 November.

== Reception ==
=== Box office ===
In 10 days, the film grossed ₹9.4 crore worldwide, with ₹5.1 crore from Kerala alone. It collected ₹15 crore worldwide in 17 days, with ₹9 crore from India and ₹5 crore (with more than 50,000 admissions) from the Gulf Cooperation Council territories. As of 21 June 2019, Uyare is the third highest-grossing Malayalam film of 2019 in the United States and the rest-of-India territories, behind Lucifer and Kumbalangi Nights. It grossed $93,597 (₹64.98 lakh) in the US in eight weeks. In May first week, Uyare was ranked among the top 10 best grossing films of that week in the multiplexes in India. However, in the United Kingdom, it grossed just £637 (₹58,095) in two weeks.

In the United Arab Emirates (UAE), the film grossed $355,336 in the opening weekend (2 – 5 May) and was the best opener and the second best grossing film of that weekend (behind Avengers: Endgame). It grossed $647,059 in six weeks run in the UAE. The film was released on 9 May in Australia and New Zealand, grossing $3,041 and $2,937 respectively in the opening weekend, and a total of $10,146 and $3,809 from two weeks. It collected $216 in the opening weekend in Nigeria. As of June 2019, Uyare remains in the top 50 highest-grossing films of the year in Nigeria and it is the only Malayalam film in the list.

=== Critical reception ===
Rating the film 4.5 on a scale of 5 and describing the film as "poignant" and "classy", Sajin Shrijith of The New Indian Express said, "From the first frame to the last, Uyare is an exercise in restrained, sensitive filmmaking." Gautam S. of Deccan Chronicle wrote: "Uyare is an engaging and inspirational movie, which will remain in our hearts. It flies high on a gratifying script and performances."

Sify.com rated the film 4 on a scale of 5 and wrote that the film is "an overwhelming experience that narrates a highly relevant issue in a fabulous way." Film critic Veeyen wrote: "The structural elements of ‘Uyare’ are bound to be familiar and the genre expectations are all in place, in that it has all the essential prerequisites of a survivor story. And yet, it's a story that needs to be told, time and again, in a world that has turned a bit too dark with relationships that have gone all adrift."

Litty Simon from Malayala Manorama rated 4 out of 5 stars and wrote that, "The biggest strength of Uyare lies in its screenplay with minimal yet powerful dialogues. by Sanjay-Bobby is crisp and well etched by director Manu. Uyare is highly engaging right from the beginning to end. S. R. Praveen from The Hindu felt that "predictability is a problem" [in the film] and was also critical about the background score. He however praised Parvathy's performance, writing: "Despite the minor quibbles, ‘Uyare’ soars high on Parvathy's wings."

== Accolades ==
Award	Category	Recipient(s)	Result
Asianet Film Awards	Best Film	Uyare	Won
Asianet Film Awards	Best Actress	Parvathy Thiruvothu	Won
Asianet Film Awards	Best Supporting Actor	Siddique	Won
Asianet Film Awards	Performer Of The Year	Asif Ali	Won
Asianet Film Awards	Best Male Playback Singer	Vijay Yesudas ("Nee Mukilo")	Won
9th South Indian International Movie Awards	Best Film	Uyare	Nominated
9th South Indian International Movie Awards	Best Actress	Parvathy Thiruvothu	Nominated
9th South Indian International Movie Awards	Best Debut Director	Manu Ashokan	Nominated
9th South Indian International Movie Awards	Best Debut Producer	Scube Films	Won
9th South Indian International Movie Awards	Best Music Director	Gopi Sundar	Nominated
9th South Indian International Movie Awards	Best Lyrics	Rafeeq Ahamed	Nominated
9th South Indian International Movie Awards	Best Male Playback Singer	Vijay Yesudas	Nominated
