= Tony Babu =

Indian film sound designer

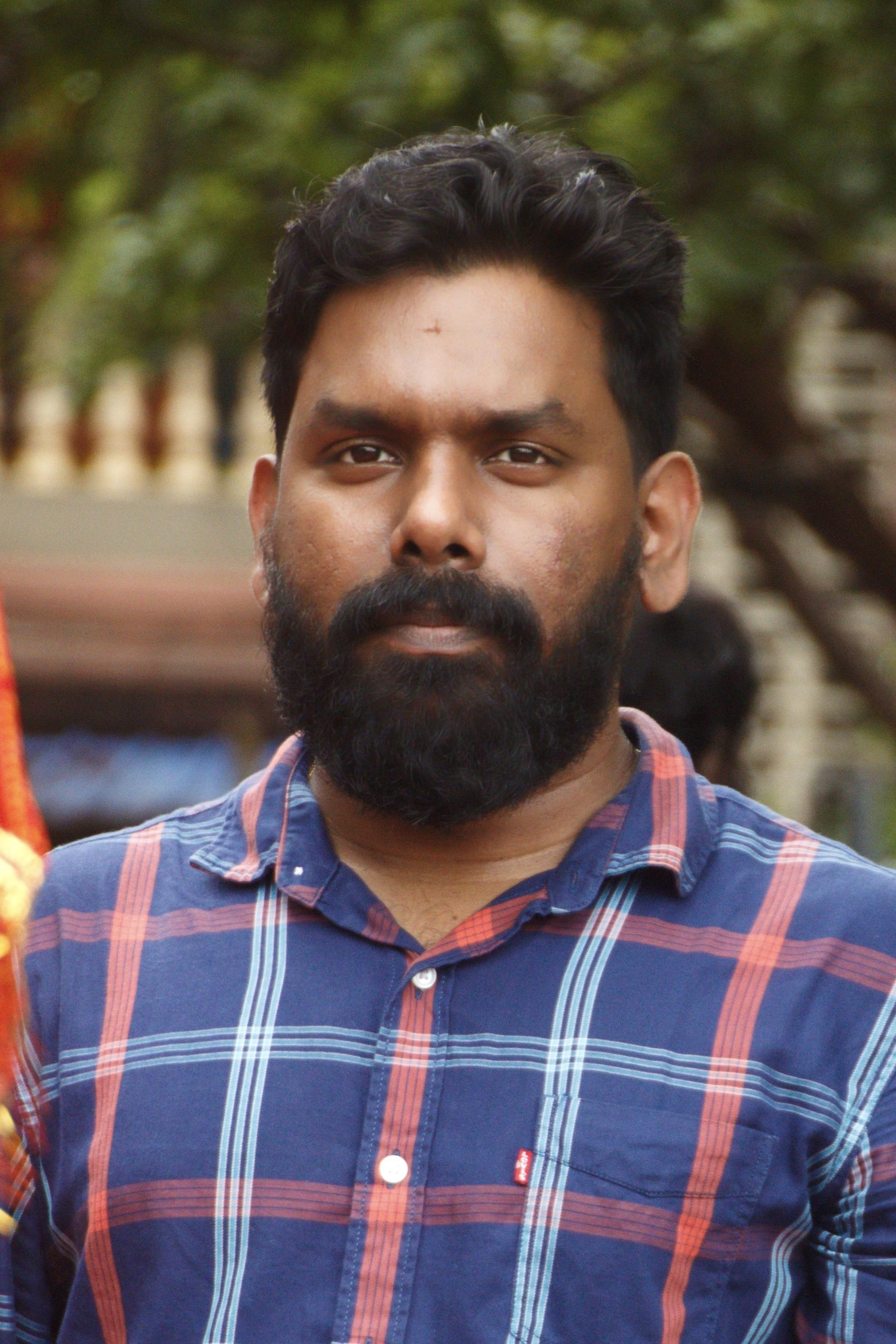
- Born: 11 July 1990 (age 36); Sasthamkotta, Kollam district, Kerala, India
- Education: Neo Film School, Ernakulam
- Occupation: Audio engineer
- Years active: 2011-present
- Spouse: Jisha
- Children: 1
- Website: tonybabu.com

Tony Babu (born 11 July 1990) is an Indian film sound designer, sound editor, sound mixer and mixing engineer. He has worked in various Indian language films and web series including Hindi, Marathi, Malayalam and Punjabi. He is a member of the Motion Picture Sound Editors. He won the Kerala State Film Award for Best Sound Designer for The Great Indian Kitchen. He co-founded Sonic Drops Studio, a sound post-production studio, along with Robin Kunjukutty in Mumbai.

== Career ==
After completing the sound engineering course from Neo Film School, Ernakulam, Tony moved to Mumbai and assisted Boby John for four years. He then works as independent sound editor and designer for various films including C/O Saira Banu, Udaharanam Sujatha, Joseph, Kilometers and Kilometers and The Great Indian Kitchen.

== Selected filmography ==
Year	Title	Credit	Director(s)	Language
2011	Tanu Weds Manu	Sound editor	Aanand L. Rai	Hindi
2011	The Dirty Picture	Sound effects editor	Milan Luthria	Hindi
2013	Special 26	Sound editor	Neeraj Pandey	Hindi
2014	Killa	Sound effects editor	Avinash Arun	Marathi
2015	Roy	Sound editor	Vikramjith Singh	Hindi
2015	Piku	Sound editor	Shoojit Sircar	Hindi
2015	Tanu Weds Manu: Returns	Sound editor Assistant sound designer	Anand L. Rai	Hindi
2015	Bajirao Mastani	Sound editor	Sanjay Leela Bhansali	Hindi
2016	Baaghi	Sound editor Sound effects designer	Sabbir Khan	Hindi
2016	Sila Samayangalil	Dialogue editor	Priyadarshan	Tamil
2017	C/O Saira Banu	Sound mixer Sound designer Sound editor	Antony Sony Sebastian	Malayalam
2018	Kunju Daivam	Sound mixer Sound designer Sound editor	Jeo Baby	Malayalam
2018	Orayiram Kinakkalal	Sound designer Sound editor	Pramod Mohan	Malayalam
2018	Lust Stories	Associate sound designer Sound editor	Anurag Kashyap; Zoya Akhtar; Dibakar Banerjee; Karan Johar	Hindi
2018	Sacred Games	Dialogue editor	Anurag Kashyap; Vikramaditya Motwane; Neeraj Ghaywan	Hindi
2018	Karwaan	Associate sound designer Sound editor	Akarsh Khurana	Hindi
2018	Little Things	Sound editor	Ajay Bhuyan; Ruchir Arun	Hindi
2018	Nonsense	Sound mixer Sound designer Sound editor	M. C. Jithin	Malayalam
2018	Joseph	Sound mixer Sound designer Sound editor	M. Padmakumar	Malayalam
2020	Gauthamante Radham	Sound designer	Anand Menon	Malayalam
2020	Trance	Dialogue editor Sound editor	Anwar Rasheed	Malayalam
2020	K-nowledge (short film)	Sound designer	Grace Antony	Malayalam
2020	Kilometers and Kilometers	Sound designer Supervising sound editor	Jeo Baby	Malayalam
2020	The Great Indian Kitchen	Sound designer Supervising sound editor	Jeo Baby	Malayalam
2023	Kannur Squad	Sound designer Supervising sound editor	Roby Varghese Raj	Malayalam
2023	Kaathal – The Core	Sound designer Supervising sound editor	Jeo Baby	Malayalam
2024	Kadha Innuvare	Sound designer	Vishnu Mohan	Malayalam

== Accolades ==
- 2020 - Kerala State Film Award for Best Sound Designer for The Great Indian Kitchen
