= 51st Kerala State Film Awards =

Kerala State Film Awards

- Awarded for: Honouring achievements in Malayalam films
- Date: 17 October 2021
- Location: Thiruvananthapuram
- Country: India
- Presented by: Kerala State Chalachitra Academy
- First award: 1969

Highlights
- Most wins: Sufiyum Sujatayum (5)
- Website: https://www.keralafilm.com

The 51st Kerala State Film Awards, presented by the Kerala State Chalachitra Academy were announced by Saji Cherian, the Minister of Cultural Affairs, Kerala, in Thiruvananthapuram on 16 October 2021. A total of 80 films competed for the awards.

== Writing category ==
=== Jury ===
• P. K. Rajashekaran (chairman)
•
• C. Ajoy (member and secretary)

=== Awards ===
All award recipients receive a cash prize, certificate and statuette.

Name of award	Title of work	Awardee(s)	Cash prize
Best Book on Cinema	Aakyanathinte Piriyan Kovanikal	P. K.Surendran	₹30,000
Best Article on Cinema	Adoorinte 5 Nayaka Kathapathrangal	John Samuel	₹20,000

== Film category ==
=== Awards ===
All award recipients receive a cash prize, certificate and statuette.

Name of award	Title of film	Awardee(s)	Cash prize
Best Film	The Great Indian Kitchen	Director: Jeo Baby	₹100,000
Best Film	The Great Indian Kitchen	Producer: Dijo Augustine; Jomon Jacob; Vishnu Rajan; Sajin S Raj	₹200,000
Second Best Film	Thinkalazhcha Nishchayam	Director: Senna Hegde	₹150,000
Second Best Film	Thinkalazhcha Nishchayam	Producer: Pushkara Mallikarjunaiah	₹150,000
Best Director	Ennivar	Sidhartha Siva	₹200,000
Best Actor	Vellam	Jayasurya	₹100,000
Best Actress	Kappela	Anna Ben	₹100,000
Best Character Actor	Bhoomiyile Manohara Swakaryam; Ennivar	Sudheesh	₹50,000
Best Character Actress	Veyil	Sreerekha	₹50,000
Best Child Artist	Kasiminte Kadal	Niranjan S (Male category)	₹50,000
Best Child Artist	Pyali	Aravya Sharma (Female category)	₹50,000
Best Story	Thinkalazhcha Nishchayam	Senna Hegde	₹50,000
Best Cinematography	Kayattam	Chandru Selvaraj	₹50,000
Best Screenplay (Original)	The Great Indian Kitchen	Jeo Baby	₹25,000 each
Best Screenplay (Adaptation)	Not Awarded		
Best Lyrics	Bhoomiyile Manohara Swakaryam ("Smaranagal Kadalyi"); Malik ("Theerame Theerame")	Anwar Ali	₹50,000
Best Music Director (song)	Sufiyum Sujatayum (All songs)	M. Jayachandran	₹50,000
Best Music Director (score)	Sufiyum Sujatayum	M. Jayachandran	₹50,000
Best Male Singer	Halal Love Story ("Sundaranayavane"); Vellam ("Aakashamayavale")	Shahabaz Aman	₹50,000
Best Female Singer	Sufiyum Sujatayum ("Vathikkalu Vellarippravu")	Nithya Mamman	₹50,000
Best Editor	C U Soon	Mahesh Narayanan	₹50,000
Best Art Director	Malik; Pyali	Santosh Raman	₹50,000
Best Sync Sound	Santhoshathinte Onnam Rahasyam	Adarsh Joseph Cheriyan	₹50,000
Best Sound Mixing	Sufiyum Sujatayum	Ajith Abraham George	₹50,000
Best Sound Design	The Great Indian Kitchen	Tony Babu	₹25,000 each
Best Processing Lab/Colourist			₹50,000
Best Makeup Artist	Article 21	Rasheed Ahamed	₹50,000
Best Costume Designer	Malik	Dhanya Balakrishnan	₹50,000
Best Dubbing Artist	Bhoomiyile Manohara Swakaryam (Character:Thambidurai)	Shoby Thilakan (Male category)	₹50,000
Best Dubbing Artist	Ayyappanum Koshiyum (Character:Kannamma)	Riya Saira (Female category)	₹50,000
Best Choreography	Sufiyum Sujatayum	Lalitha Soby; Babu Xavier	₹25,000 each
Best Film with Popular Appeal and Aesthetic Value	Ayyappanum Koshiyum	Producers: Ranjith; P. M. Sasidharan	₹25,000 each
Best Film with Popular Appeal and Aesthetic Value	Ayyappanum Koshiyum	Director:Sachy	₹100,000
Best Debut Director	Kappela	Muhammad Musthafa	₹100,000
Best Children's Film	Bonamy	Producer: Sinseer	₹300,000
Best Children's Film	Bonamy	Director : Tony Sukumar	₹100,000
Best Visual Effects	Love	Sarjas Muhammed (awarded for Visual Effects) Anish D. Sumesh Gopal	₹50,000

=== Special Jury Mention ===
All recipients receive a certificate and statuette.

Name of award	Title of film	Awardee(s)	Awarded for
Special Mention	Bharathapuzha	Siji Pradeep	Acting
Special Mention	Ayyappanum Koshiyum	Nanjiyamma	Singing the song "Kalakkatha Sandanamera"
Special Mention	Bharathapuzha	Nalini Jameela	Costume
