= Gilu Joseph =

Malayali poet, lyricist

- Born: Kumily, Kerala, India
- Occupations: Poet; lyricist

Gilu Joseph is a Malayali poet and lyricist. She earlier worked as an air hostess with Flydubai. She has also acted in Malayalam film.

== Personal life ==
Gilu hails from Kumily, Idukki district, Kerala, she also has two sisters. She moved to Dubai at the age of 18 to work as cabin crew with Flydubai.

Gilu appeared on the cover of the March edition of Grihalakshmi, breastfeeding a baby as a part of their 'breastfeed freely' campaign. A complaint was lodged with the State Child Rights Commission against the magazine and Gilu, by various lawyers. A petition was filed with the Kerala HC alleging that the magazine cover violated provisions of the Protection of Children from Sexual Offenses Act (POCSO), However, the court did not agree with the petitioner's allegation. The court observed that 'obscenity lies in the crotch of the beholder'.

== Work ==
- Vaarikkuzhiyile Kolapathakam (2019)
- Ottamuri Velicham (2017)
- Adam Joan (2017)
- C/O Saira Banu (2017)
- Sathya (2017)
- 2 Penkuttikal (2016)
- Lailaa O Lailaa (2015)

== Plays ==
- Hand of God

== Filmography ==
List of Gilu Joseph film credits
Year	Film	Role	Notes
2016	Jacobinte Swargarajyam	Abdul's wife	Debut film
2017	C/O Saira Banu	Lawyer	
2017	Thrissivaperoor Kliptham	Damayanthi	
2017	Aby	Mini	
2017	Rabbit Hole	Christy	Short film
2017	Aana Alaralodalaral	Kadeesu	
2018	Parole	Varkkichan's wife	
2018	Kadha Paranja Kadha	Devi	
2018	Aabhaasam	Chitra	
2018	Abrahaminte Santhathikal	Maria	
2018	Ranam	Aadi's mother	
2018	Nonsense	Biology teacher	
2019	Ihitha	Unnamed	Short film
2019	Sitayanam	Sita	Short film
2019	Sanchari	Traveller	Music video
2019	Thakkol	Clara	
2020	Anjaam Pathiraa	Doctor	
2020	Shepherds From Hell	Shiny Mathew	Webseries
2021	Instagraamam	Vanaja	Webseries
2021	Jan.E.Man	Saramma	
2021	Bhramam	Samuel's wife	
2021	Kaaval	Varghese's wife	
2021	Sumesh and Ramesh	Asha	
2022	Bhoothakalam	Dr. Beena	
2022	Sreedhanya Catering Service	Simi	
2022	Rorschach	Police Constable	
2022	Chathuram	Balthazar's sister in law	
2022	Durga	Unnamed	Short film
2023	2018	Jiji	
2023	Kunjamminis Hospital	Elsy	
2023	Antony	Selena	
2023	Pookkalam	Remani	
2024	Vishesham	Mini	
2025	Identity	Smitha Shankar	
2025	Azadi		

== Awards ==
She was awarded the Palm Pusthakapura Akshara Thoolika award for her poetry.
