= Kalamandalam Leelamma =

Indian classical dancer

- Born: Leelamma; 1952
- Died: 15 June 2017 (aged 64–65)
- Occupations: Mohiniyattam dancer and dance teacher
- Honors: Sangeet Natak Akademi Award

Kalamandalam Leelamma (c.1952 – 15 June 2017) was a leading Mohiniyattam dancer from Kerala, India.

She was awarded Sangeet Natak Akademi Award for her contribution to Mohiniyattam.

== Biography ==
Leelamma was born in 1952, in Mattakkara in Kottayam district of Kerala. She is the daughter of Ramakrishnan Nair and Lakshmi Amma. She began her Mohiniyattam studies Kerala Kalamandalam in the early seventies. She studied Mohiniyattam under Kalamandalam Satyabhama and Kalamandalam Chandrika at Kerala Kalamandalam. She has also studied Bharatanatyam and Kuchipudi.

Leelamma and her husband Madhusudhanan have two children, Krishnaprasad and Krishnapriya. She died on 15 June 2017.

== Career ==
After her studies at Kerala Kalamandalam, Leelamma worked there as a teacher and later as the head of the Mohiniyattam department. She also worked as the campus director of Kalamandalam deemed university. She retired from there in 2007 March.

Leelamma later worked as reader in Sree Sankaracharya University of Sanskrit, Kaladi during 1995-98. She also served as a member of the Academic Executive Committee of Sri Shankaracharya University and was also involved in revising the syllabus of the university's Mohiniyattam postgraduate course.

Leelamma is an A Top Artist of Doordarshan.

== Contributions ==
Leelamma has performed Mohiniyattam at numerous venues in India and abroad and has run her own institute called Swathi Chitra in Atthani, Thrissur district, to conduct research on Mohiniyattam.

Leelamma gone beyond the traditional Mohiniyattam dance performances by directing her own Mohiniyattam adaptations. Leelamma assimilated the possibilities of performing the emotion of fear into Mohiniyattam, through her directions like the Narasimha avatar performance with the kirtana that begins with 'Shriman Narayana', and Hiranyakashipu. Through these directions she invalidated the unwritten rule that only soft emotions like love, devotion, and compassion are applicable in Mohiniyattam.

The kirtana, which began with 'Kamitavaradayaka', which made Shiva the main character instead of Vishnu, was also a new step in the history of Mohiniyattam. Leelamma expanded the stage possibilities of Mohiniyattam by adding different and unique heroines from Indian mythological stories to the conceptual sphere of Mohiniyattam.

In addition to traditional kirtans, Leelamma has directed and presented famous Malayalam poems and other works in the Mohiniyattam form. Examples of these include Vallathol's poems Magdalana Mariam, Shishyanum Makanum, Achannum Makanum, Kumaranasan's poem Veenapoovu, Vailoppilly's Mampazham, O.N.V.'s Ujjayini, and Kunchan Nambiar's work Kalyana Saugandhikam.

The book Mohiniyattam Siddhantavum Prayogavum (meaning: theory and practice of Mohiniyattam), written by her comprehensively describes Mohiniyattam.

== Awards and honors ==
Leelamma has received awards such as the Sangeet Natak Akademi Award for Mohiniyattam, the Kerala Sangeetha Nataka Akademi Award for Mohiniyattam, the Kalamandalam Award, the Sangeet Natak Akademi Fellowship and the Keraleeya Nirthya Natya Award from Government of Kerala.

Kunchan Memorial Trust honored Leelamma with the title 'Natyamohini' for adapting and directing Kunchan Nambiar's Kalyana Saugandhigam ottam thullal into Mohiniyattam dance. She also received the 'Natyashree' title from Cochin Kaladarpana and the 'Natyabharathi' title from Kairali Arts.
