= Kilometers and Kilometers =

Indian Malayalam-language comedy-drama film

- Official poster
- Written by: Jeo Baby
- Directed by: Jeo Baby
- Starring: Tovino Thomas; Joju George; India Jarvis; Sidhartha Siva; Basil Joseph
- Music by: Sooraj S. Kurup
- Country of origin: India
- Original language: Malayalam

Production
- Producers: Tovino Thomas; Ramshi Ahamed; Anto Joseph; Sinu Sidharth
- Cinematography: Sinu Sidharth
- Editors: Rahman Mohammed Ali; Prejish Prakash
- Production companies: Anto Joseph Film Company; Ramshi Ahamed Productions

Original release
- Network: Asianet
- Release: 31 August 2020

Kilometers and Kilometers is a 2020 Indian Malayalam-language comedy-drama film directed by Jeo Baby. The film is jointly produced by Tovino Thomas, Ramshi Ahamed, Anto Joseph and Sinu Sidharth, under the banner of Anto Joseph Film Company and Ramshi Ahamed Productions. Starring Tovino Thomas, Joju George, India Jarvis, Sidhartha Siva and Basil Joseph, it is a road film that follows the story of an American woman (played by Jarvis) who sets out on a journey with a man from Kottayam (played by Thomas). The title of the film refers to a popular dialogue from the 1986 film Mazha Peyyunnu Maddalam Kottunnu starring Mohanlal and directed by Priyadarshan.

Initially scheduled to be released on 12 March 2020, the film's launch was postponed due to the COVID-19 pandemic. It was finally released worldwide on 31 August 2020, coinciding with Onam festival, through the Asianet television channel.

== Plot ==
Josemon is a local handyman in his village. He does everything to make ends meet but is unable to earn enough to support his family and his sister's education. Finally, without options, he decides to sell his Bullet (Royal Enfield Bullet) motorbike which he had kept as a memory of his father. But the same day Cathy comes into his life.

Cathy is an American who came to visit India and is looking for a local guide who can take her everywhere in India. Appachan asks Josemon to do the job. Josemon is supposed to take her by road to Jaipur from where she will fly back to the US. Josemon takes her on a journey through Tamil Nadu, Karnataka, Gujarat and while on the way to Jaipur their belongings are stolen from the bike.

Everything including their money, passports and clothes are stolen and both go to the police station to file a complaint. On their way, they meet Sunny and become friends. Sunny invites them to stay with him till Cathy can arrange some money for visiting the American consulate and reapply for a passport. But during their stay with Sunny, Cathy meets with an accident and breaks her arm. Josemon takes her to a hospital. But during the few days at the hospital, Josemon had to sell-off his bike to meet the hospital expenses and Cathy's interview.

Cathy becomes upset that Josemon sold his bike for her. Cathy confesses that she was just lying that she does not have the money yet because she was enjoying her stay with Josemon. Cathy and Sunny search for the bike they could not find it.

Cathy and Josemon get her passport and they both go to Mumbai. Her mother gets her flight tickets to the US. Before leaving Josemon gives her a letter saying that he is in love with her. Josemon returns to Kerala.

Three months later, we see Josemon working in a workshop in his village as a bullet expert. He gets a letter from the Police station in Jaipur that they have recovered his driver's license and other belongings and asks him to come and collect it. He gets a phone call from Sunny the same day saying that he is now the father of a baby now and he wants Josemon to come and see the baby. When Josemon reaches Jaipur he sees his old bullet motorcycle with Cathy. Sunny and Cathy worked hard and was able to get Josemon's bullet motorcycle back, which makes Josemon happy.

Later, we see that Josemon and Cathy continuing their journey in Josemon's Bullet across India.

== Cast ==
- Tovino Thomas as Josemon
- India Jarvis as Cathy
- Joju George as Appachan
- Sidhartha Siva as Sunny / Veerbhai
- Basil Joseph as Kuttan
- Mamitha Baiju as Kochumol, Josemon's Sister
- Parvathi T as Josemon's Mother
- Pauly Valsan as Kuttan's mother
- Jeo Baby as Villager
- Sinu Sidharth as Bike Rider

== Production ==
=== Development ===
In October 2018, Tovino Thomas was announced to star in Jeo Baby's third directorial film, with whom Thomas earlier collaborated in the 2016 film 2 Penkuttikal. The film was also titled as Kilometers and Kilometers, which is a famous dialogue from the Mohanlal-starrer Mazha Peyunnu Maddalam Kottunnu (1986). Thomas was reported to play a youth from a rural area and it is touted to be a road-drama film. The first look was launched in February 2019 by actor Mohanlal, which also named him as the film producer. The film marked Tovino's first film as a producer and sharing about the script, he stated that "The script of this film is one of the best I have come across so far and I should say that its shoot was something I really enjoyed being involved in throughout."

=== Casting ===
Jeo Baby, approached American actress India Jarvis to play the role of Catherine, after he tried to cast a foreign actress for the role since 2017. Jeo explained that the process was tough since many foreigners were not ready to come to India because of safety concerns and the difficult work schedules. He added "After our search through casting calls and agencies proved futile, we tried through our individual connections and that's how we finally found India through Mathews [Pullickan], who was the composer of my film Kunju Daivam. We watched certain short films she was part of and zeroed in on her for the role." About her role Catherine, India stated that she had to learn Malayalam for few scenes in the film, which was her "biggest challenge" and stated that Tovino guided her to learn Malayalam for the film. Joju George who was a part of Baby's previous film Kunju Deivam was assigned to play Appachan in the film.

=== Filming ===
Shooting of the film commenced in February 2019, with Tovino sharing few pictures from Ladakh as a part of the shoot. In March 2019, the team moved to Kozhikode where the second schedule of filming progressed. The team travelled across the country for 36 days, covering Tamil Nadu, Karnataka, Maharashtra, Goa, Gujarat and Rajasthan, where many important parts of it were shot. The climax portion was shot in the Himalayas.

== Soundtrack ==
Kilometers and Kilometers

Soundtrack album by Sooraj S Kurup
- Released: 12 August 2020
- Recorded: 2020
- Genre: Feature film soundtrack
- Length: 3:54
- Language: Malayalam, Hindi
- Label: Muzik247
- Producer: Sooraj S. Kurup

Sooraj S Kurup chronology
Luca (2020)	Kilometers and Kilometers (2020)	The Great Indian Kitchen (2021)

Initially Gopi Sunder was reported to score music for the film and was also credited in the film's poster, but he was subsequently replaced by Sooraj S. Kurup. The background score was composed by Sushin Shyam. On 6 March 2020, the team released the first video song "Paarake" on YouTube, followed by the film's audio launch which held before the release on 11 March 2020. However, the album was out on major music streaming platforms on 12 August 2020.

Track listing
No.	Title	Lyrics	Singer(s)	Length
1.	"Paaraake"	Sooraj S. Kurup, Vinayak Sasikumar	Sooraj S. Kurup, Ramshi Ahamed, Mridul Anil, Pavithra Das, Pranavya Das	3:54
2.	"Diname Diname"	B. K. Harinarayanan	Mridul Anil	4:53
3.	"Thelinjee Vaanaake"	B. K. Harinarayanan, Lakshmi Menon	Sithara Krishnakumar, Sooraj S. Kurup, Aditi Nair R	3:44
4.	"Thaane Mounam"	Vinayak Sasikumar, Nisha Nair	Sooraj S. Kurup, Yadu Krishnan K, Neethu Naduvathettu	2:57
5.	"You And Me"	Sooraj S. Kurup, Vinayak Sasikumar	Sooraj S. Kurup, Neethu Naduvathettu	2:05
6.	"Paaraake"	Sooraj S. Kurup, Vinayak Sasikumar	Sooraj S. Kurup, Ramshi Ahamed, Mridul Anil, Pavithra Das, Pranavya Das	5:54
Total length:				6:22

== Release ==
Kilometers and Kilometers initially received a U certificate from the Censor Board and was scheduled for a release on 12 March 2020. However, two days before the scheduled release, the government had ordered to shut theatres across Kerala in the wake of COVID-19 pandemic, and the team had to postpone the release. In April 2020, the film was subjected to internet piracy after few of the scenes were leaked online, causing the producer Anto Joseph to approach the Film Exhibitors Union of Kerala (FEUOK) seeking permission to release it on over-the-top media service. The union immediately approved for OTT release as in consideration with the huge losses, the producer had to suffer because of piracy.

Initially the film was set to release on Disney+ Hotstar, but the team planned to go for a direct television premiere on Asianet during the occasion of Onam (31 August 2020). On 28 January 2021, the film was aired digitally through Netflix.
