= Krishnashtami: The Book of Dry Leaves =

Krishnashtami: the book of dry leaves
- Directed by: Abhilash Babu
- Screenplay by: Abhilash Babu
- Story by: Vyloppilli Sreedhara Menon; Abhilash Babu
- Produced by: Anil Ambalakkara
- Starring: Jeo Baby
- Cinematography: Jithin Mathew
- Edited by: Anu George
- Music by: Ouseppachan
- Production company: Ambalakkara Global Films
- Release date: 2025
- Running time: 78 minutes
- Country: India
- Language: Malayalam

Krishnashtami: the book of dry leaves is a 2025 Malayalam language experimental still image film conceived and directed by Abhilash Babu for producer Anil Ambalakkara. The film is based on the poem 'Krishnashtami' by Vyloppilli Sreedhara Menon which appeared in the 1958 collection 'Kadalkkakkakal'.

The film, India's first still image film is a modern cinematic interpretation of the poem, starring Jeo Baby in the lead with many newcomers, has been officially selected at 48th Moscow International Film Festival.

== Summary ==
Krishnashtami the book of dry leaves is the story of a few vagabonds arrested by the authority and their life in prison as well as their back stories and the ultimate tragedy happened in their lives on the Krishnanashtami day.

== Cast ==
- Jeo Baby
- Abhijith Chithrakumar
- Sushama Anil
- Surya S
- Aparna Asok
- Sreeparvathy
- Rukkiya Beevi
- RajeshB
- P K Kunju
- Geomy N George
- Krishnan Nair
- Ajith Vidhyasagar
- Vishnu Das
- Shaji Sasthamangalam
- Kenshin
- Faizal Ananthapuri
- Shaji A John
- Pradeep Kumar
- Remesh S Makayiram
- Arshad Azad
- Bhaskaran
- Sabari S Jeevan
- Anish Asramom
- Sebastian Julian
- Arun Mohan

== Production ==
Director Abhilash Babu, who has already made Aalokam (2023) and Maayunnu, Maarivarayunnu, Nisvaasangalil... (2024), a film that was premiered at the 29th IFFK, signed actor director Jeo Baby for his third film based on Vyloppilli's poem 'Krishnashtami'. The film is conceived as a modern cinematic interpretation by the director. The first look poster of the film was released on 9 March 2025. The principal photography of the film started at Thiruvananthapuram, where major portions are canned and the entire filming was completed in 8 days. Babu signed Ouseppachan as the composer of the film, that has 7 sound tracks with Ouseppachan, Vidyadharan and several new singers like Swarna as playback singers. The film wrapped up its entire shoot at Poovar on 21 June 2025. A special screening of the movie was organized by Banner film society on 30 November 2025 at Thiruvananthapuram, followed by its participation at several film festivals.
