= Abhilash Babu =

Indian film director

- Born: Thiruvananthapuram, Kerala
- Citizenship: India
- Occupations: Film Director; Poet

Abhilash Babu is an Indian film director, screenwriter and lyricist who predominantly works in Malayalam cinema. Krishnashtami: the book of dry leaves, India's first still image film is Babu's third directorial. The film had its international premiere at 48th Moscow International Film Festival.

== Career ==
Abhilash Babu was born to and brought up by Babu and Omana Amma in Thiruvananthapuram. He had his degree, PG, and PhD in English Language and Literature from University College Thiruvananthapuram.

Babu made his debut as a feature film director with Aalokam: Ranges of Vision (2023), followed by Maayunnu, Maarivarayunnu, Nisvaasangalil... (2024), a mocumentary premiered at the 29th IFFK, both crowd funded independent films. Jeo Baby, the director of Mammootty starrer Kaathal – The Core, played the lead role in Babu's third film, Krishnashtami: the book of dry leaves (2025), touted as India's first still image film.

== Filmography ==
=== Films ===
Year	Title	Cast	Notes
2026	Social Swami	Naga Sairandhri Devi	Shooting in progress
2025	Krishnashtami: the book of dry leaves	Jeo Baby	Based on the poem 'Krishnashtami' by Vyloppilli Sreedhara Menon
2024	Maayunnu, Maarivarayunnu, Nisvaasangalil...	Pradeep Kumar	Premiered at the 29th IFFK.
2023	Aalokam: Ranges of Vision	Abhijith Chithrakumar	Based on the poems by Robert Browning
