= Sudheesh =

Indian film actor (born 1972)

- Born: 7 December 1972 (age 53); Kozhikode, Kerala, India
- Occupation: Actor
- Spouse: Dhanya
- Children: 2
- Parents: T. Sudhakaran Nair; Suryaprabha

Sudheesh (born 7 December 1972) is an Indian actor and director who predominantly works in Malayalam film industry. He won the Kerala State Film Award for Best Character Actor in 2021.

== Personal life ==
Sudheesh is the only son of T. Sudhakaran Nair and Suryaprabha. Sudhakaran Nair was a retired deputy collector and an actor who performed notable roles in films such as Bharatham (1991), Sadayam (1992), Pattabhishekam (1999), Khaki (2007), Gulmohar (2008), Indian Rupee (2011) etc. The father-son duo has acted together in many films. Similarly, Sudheesh's son Rudraksh has acted as child hero in the film Kochavva Paulo Ayyappa Coelho (2016). Sudheesh did his schooling from St. Joseph's Boys' Higher Secondary School, Kozhikode and higher studies in St. Joseph's College, Devagiri. Sudheesh married Dhanya on 30 March 2005. They have two sons. His father died on 4 January 2016 at age 73.

== Filmography ==
=== 1980s ===
Year	Title	Role	Notes
1987	Anantaram	Teenage Ajayakumar	
1987	Poomazha	Student	
1989	Mudra	Unni	
1989	Snehadooth		Not released

=== 1990s ===
Year	Title	Role	Notes
1991	Venal Kinavukal	Anil	
1992	Aadhaaram	Rameshan	
1992	Thalastaanam	Young Harikrishnan	
1993	Samooham	Johny	
1993	Cheppadividya	Josootty	
1993	O' Faby	Voice For Roque Tharakan	
1993	Manichithrathazhu	Chanthu(Kindi)	
1994	Chakoram	Unni	
1994	Njan Kodiswaran	Hari	
1994	Pavithram	Sivankutty	
1994	Pradhakshinam	Reghu	
1994	Nandini Oppol	Murali	
1994	Daivathinte Vikruthikal	Sivan	
1994	Sudhinam	Appu	
1994	Varanamalyam	Vinu/Vinod Kumar	
1994	Vendor Daniel State Licency	Joy Daniel	
1994	Vardhakya Puranam	Satheesh	
1995	Alanchery Thambrakal	Son of Bhagavathar	
1995	Avittam Thirunaal Aarogya Sriman	Nakulan	
1995	Kakkakum Poochakkum Kalyanam	Achutty	
1995	Sasinas	Unni	
1995	Kokkarakko	Rameshan	
1995	Pai Brothers	Manu	
1995	Sreeragam	Vaithi	
1996	Ee Puzhayum Kadannu	Satheesh	
1996	Aakasathoru Kilivathil		
1996	Excuse Me Ethu Collegila	Pappan	
1996	Poonilavu		
1996	Vanarasena	Manikandan	
1997	Kannur	Unni	
1997	Niyogam	Damu	
1997	Aniyathi Pravu	Radhamadhavan	
1997	The Good Boys	Sudhi	
1997	Oral Mathram	Balachandran	
1998	British Market	Joyichan	
1998	Chenapparambile Aanakkariyam	Sudhi	
1998	Chinthavishtayaya Shyamala	Suku	
1998	Kusruthikuruppu	Gopu	
1998	Harikrishnans	Thomas Mathew	
1998	Manjukalavum Kazhinju	Antappan	
1998	Sreekrishnapurathe Nakshathrathilakkam	Chandran	
1998	Kottaram Veettile Apputtan	Dr. Namboothiri	
1999	Ustaad	Faisal	
1999	Chandamama	Dasan	
1999	Gandhiyan	Pravin	
1999	Onnaamvattam Kandappol	Nakulan	
1999	Bharya Veettil Paramasukham	Puthooramvettil Unnikrishnan/Unnikuttan	
1999	Prem Poojari	Prem's friend	
1999	Udayapuram Sulthan	Unnikrishnan	

=== 2000s ===
Year	Title	Role	Notes
2000	Sahayathrikakku Snehapoorvam	Robert	
2000	Swayamvarapanthal	Rameshan	
2000	Ee Mazha Thenmazha	Vishnu	
2000	Snehapoorvam Anna	Romeo Suresh	
2000	Valliettan	Sankarankutty	
2001	Sharja To Sharja	Unni	
2002	Nandanam	Unnikrishnan	
2002	Kaiyethum Doorath	Tony	
2002	Malayali Mamanu Vanakkam	Lodge Receptionist	
2002	Oomappenninu Uriyadappayyan	Tomy	
2002	Savithriyude Aranjanam	Dushyanthan / Appu	
2003	Thilakkam		
2003	Choonda	Madhavan	
2003	Melvilasam Sariyanu	Madanamohanan	
2003	Pattalam	Suku	
2003	Balettan	Sudhi	
2003	Meerayude Dukhavum Muthuvinte Swapnavum	Rajendran	
2003	Vellithira	Mohammed	
2004	Maampazhakkaalam	Ganeshan	
2004	Kanninum Kannadikkum	Murukan	
2004	Symphony	Sebi	
2004	Ee Snehatheerathu	Ganesh	
2004	Kakkakarumban		
2005	Ambuttu Imbuttu Embuttu	Hariharan	
2005	Five Fingers	Rafeeq	
2005	Kalyanakurimanam	Bright	
2006	Achante Ponnumakkal	Omanakuttan	
2006	Ravanan	Sunny Kurian	
2006	Pakal	Abu	
2007	Panthaya Kozhi	Balu	
2007	Khaki	Hari	
2007	Changathipoocha	Kunjunni	
2007	Nagaram	Vasu kuttan	
2007	Ali Bhai	Sameer Das	
2007	Bharathan Effect	Peter	
2008	Aayudham	Rafeeq	
2008	Vilapagalkkappuram	Khaderkutty	
2008	Shalabam	Hari	
2008	Gulmohar	Anvar	
2008	Mayakazhcha	Chakrapani	
2008	One Way Ticket		
2008	Aayudham		
2008	Oru Pennum Randaanum	Krishnankutty	
2009	Utharaswayamvaram	Tony	
2009	Kadha Samvidanam Kunchacko	Bobby	
2009	Shudharil Shudhan	Chandran	
2009	Oru Black and White Kudumbam	Thomas	
2009	Bhagavan	Attender Dineshan	
2009	Rahasya Police	S.I. Thomas	
2009	Ayirathil Oruvan	Babu	
2009	Kerala Cafe	Jose	
2009	Puthiya Mukham	Varghese	
2009	Moss & Cat	Kunchunni	

=== 2010s ===
Year	Title	Role	Notes
2010	Mummy & Me	Varun	
2010	Viralthumbilaaro		
2010	Lavakumar 1984		
2010	Thanthonni	Nandan	
2010	Pulliman	Sundaran	
2010	Sahasram	Shajahan	
2010	Holidays	Sudhi	
2010	Raama Raavanan		
2010	Nallavan	Murukan	
2011	Innanu Aa Kalyanam	Aisha's husband	
2011	Swargam 9 KM		
2011	Veeraputhran	N. P. Abu	
2011	Sankaranum Mohananum	Sahadevan	
2011	Collector	Rameshan S Namboothiri	
2011	Sthalam	Kunhappu	
2012	Perinoru Makan	Unni	
2012	Bavuttiyude Namathil	Sreekandan	
2012	Scene 1 Nammude Veedu		
2012	Josettante Hero	Kuchelan	
2012	Banking Hours 10 to 4	Ravi Kumar	
2012	Namukku Parkkan		
2012	Gruhanathan	Sundara	
2013	Hotel California	Bavutty	
2013	Ginger	Najeeb Kecheri	
2013	Mizhi	Ramu Master	
2013	101 Chodyangal	Vijayan	
2013	Orissa	Neela Madhavan	
2013	Cleopatra		
2014	Vasanthathinte Kanal Vazhikalil	E. M. S. Namboodiripad	
2014	Day Night Game		
2015	Ennu Ninte Moideen	Kottathil Ramachandran	
2015	Kaattum Mazhayum		
2015	Study Tour		
2015	Ain		
2015	Kukkiliyar	Kannan	
2016	Mohavalayam		
2016	Kochavva Paulo Ayyappa Coelho	Regi	
2016	Athijeevanam	Venu mash	
2017	Sakhavu	Daasan	
2017	Thrissivaperoor Kliptham	Mansoor/Porinju	
2018	Theevandi	Ammavan	
2018	Marubhoomiyile Mazhathullikal		
2019	Virus	Radhakrishnan	
2019	Panthu		
2019	Sathyam Paranja Viswasikkuvo	Mash	
2019	Pranaya Meenukalude Kadal	Mesthiri Damodaran	
2019	Kakshi: Amminippilla	Prakashan Manjodi	
2019	Kalki	HC Abdullah	
2019	Edakkad Battalion 06	Constable Dineshan	

=== 2020s ===
Year	Title	Role	Notes
2020	Anjaam Pathiraa	Sudevan	
2020	Bhoomiyile Manohara Swakaryam	Joseph	
2020	Kappela	Father Gabriel	
2020	Maniyarayile Ashokan	Village officer Alex	
2020	Kilometers and Kilometers	Justin J Vattakala	
2021	Kurup	Royichan	
2021	Kanakam Kaamini Kalaham	Sivakumar	
2021	Kunjeldho	Kunjeldho's father	
2021	Minnal Murali	Himself	Cameo
2022	Sathyam Mathrame Bodhippikku	Professor Mathew Thomas	
2022	Varthamanam	Dean	
2022	Lalitham Sundaram	Rajesh	
2022	Ennivar	Dasettan	
2022	Kaduva	Mathai	
2022	Heaven	Philip	
2022	Padavettu	Govindan	
2022	Mukundan Unni Associates	George Illikkal	
2022	Gold	Gold Musthafa	
2023	Djinn	Doctor	
2023	Laika		
2023	Thuruth	Razak	
2023	Kadina Kadoramee Andakadaham	Rajesh	
2023	2018	Varghese	
2023	Anuragam	Fr. Stephen Antony	
2023	Nadhikalil Sundari Yamuna	Bhaskaran	
2023	Sesham Mike-il Fathima	Muneer	
2023	Cheena Trophy	Das	
2024	LLB: Life Line of Bachelors	Shivadasan	
2024	Panchavalsara Padhathi		
2024	Prathibha Tutorials		
2024	Sureshanteyum Sumalathayudeyum Hrudayahariyaya Pranayakadha	Sumalatha's father	
2024	Ajayante Randam Moshanam	Chandu Nair	
2024	Chithini		
2024	Oru Anweshanathinte Thudakkam		
2024	Raastha		
2025	orumbettavan	rameshan	
	ente priyathamanu	ravi mash	
	Get-Set Baby	Ravi	
	Aap Kaise Ho	police	
	Dheeran	Joppan	
2026	oru durooha saahacharyathil	sasindran doctor	
	Vaazha 2	alan father	
	Unmadham	narayanasharma SI	

=== As dubbing artist ===
Year	Film	Dubbed for	Character	Notes
1993	O' Faby	Roque Tharakan	Sandy	
2002	Nandanam	Aravind Akash	Unnikrishanan	
2002	Oomappenninu Uriyadappayyan	Jayasurya	Bobby Oommen	
2012	Masters	M. Sasikumar	Milan	

== Awards ==
Award	Year	Category	Film	Result
Kerala State Film Awards	2020	Best Character Actor	Bhoomiyile Manohara Swakaryam, Ennivar	Won
Kerala Film Critics Awards	2020	Second Best Actor	Ennivar	Won

== Television ==
Program	Year	Role	Channel
Parudeesayilekkulla Patha	1994	Actor	Doordarshan
Butterflies	1999	Actor	Asianet
Ishtama	2000	Actor, director	Asianet
Sthreemanasam	2001-2003	Actor	Asianet
Sthreethwam	2005-2006	Actor	Surya TV
Ettu Sundarikalum Njnum	2004	Actor	Surya TV
Vivel Big Break	2011	Judge	Surya TV
Sundari Niyum Sundaran Njanum	2013	Judge	Asianet
Mummy and Me	2014	Judge	Kairali
Star Challenge	2015	Participant	Flowers TV
Comedy Utsavam	2017-2018	Judge	Flowers TV
Comedy Stars season 2	2018	Judge	Asianet
