= Minon =

Indian actor (born 2000)

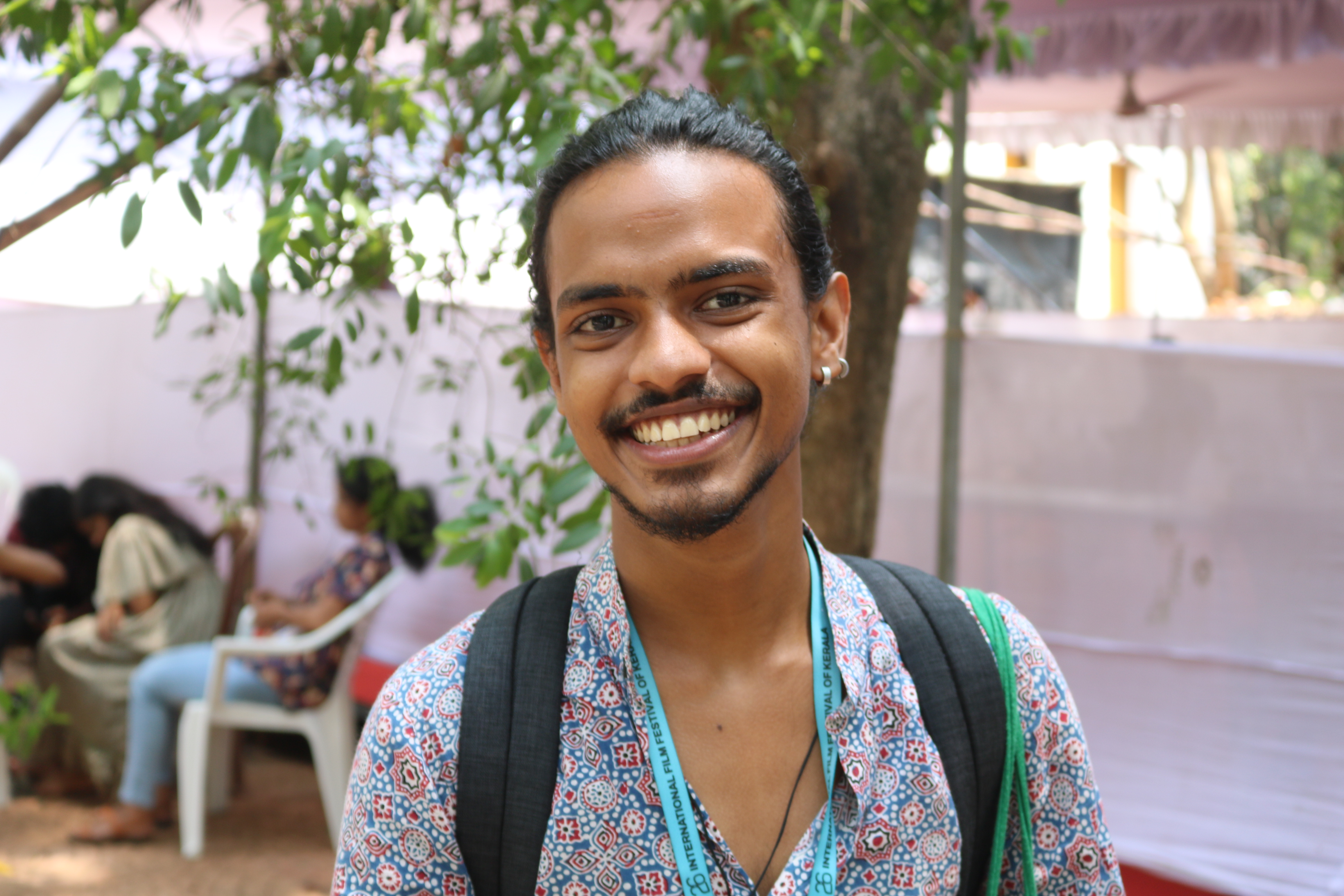
- Minon
- Born: 12 February 2000 (age 26); Alappuzha, Kerala, India
- Occupations: Actor; Painter
- Years active: 2012 – present
- Parents: John Baby; Mini John
- Relatives: Mintu John (sister)
- Awards: National Film Award for Best Child Artist, 2012; Kerala State Film Award for Best Child Artist, 2012; Kerala State Film Critics Award, 2012

Minon John (born 12 February 2000) is an Indian actor and artist, from Kerala, who works in Malayalam films.

He won the National Film Award for Best Child Artist in 2012 for the Malayalam film 101 Chodyangal. It was directed by Sidhartha Siva and produced by Thomas Kottackakom. Minon also received the Kerala State Film Award for Best Child Artist and Kerala State Film Critics Award for the same role, in which he portrays a class five student.

Minon has held more than 80 painting exhibitions so far, all across India, and he has over 3,500 paintings to his credit.

== Early life ==
Minon and his sister Mintu are trained painters by their artist parents, John Baby and Mini.

== Filmography ==
Year	Title	Role	Notes
2012	101 Chodyangal	Anilkumar Bokaro	
2014	Munnariyippu	K. P. Anil Kumar	
2014	Lal Bahadur Shastri	Sreekuttan	
2015	Mashithandu	Shanku	
2015	Ennum Eppozhum	Ganapathy	
2015	Jilebi		
2015	Urumbukal Urangarilla	Room Boy	
2016	Action Hero Biju	Benitta's brother	
2016	Appuram Bengal Ippuram Thiruvithamkoor	Anthappan	
2016	School Bus	Kannan	
2017	Swarna Kaduva	Tamil boy	
2018	Pretham 2	Manav Mathew	
2019	Naan Petta Makan	Abhimanyu	
2020	Maara	Young Maara	Tamil film
2021	Home	Young Oliver Twist	
2026	Chatha Pacha	Kunjappan	

=== Web series ===
Year	Title	Role
2020	Scoot	

== Awards ==
- 2012 - National Film Award for Best Child Artist for 101 Chodyangal
- 2012 - Kerala State Film Award for Best Child Artist for 101 Chodyangal
- 2012 - Kerala State Film Critics Award for Best Child Artist for 101 Chodyangal
- 2012 - Harlem International Film Festival Awards for Best Actor for 101 Chodyangal
