= Freedom Fight (film) =

- Poster
- Directed by: Akhil Anil Kumar; Jeo Baby; Kunjila Mascillamani; Jithin Issac Thomas; Francis Louis
- Produced by: Jomon Jacob; Dijo Augustine; Sajin S. Raj; Vishnu Rajan
- Starring: Rajisha Vijayan; Joju George; Rohini; Sidhartha Siva
- Cinematography: Salu K. Thomas; Nikhil S. Praveen; Himal Mohan
- Edited by: Francies Louis; Kunjila Mascillamani; Muhsin P. M.; Rohith V. S. Variyath
- Music by: Mathews Pulickan; Basil C J; Maathan; Arun Vijay
- Production companies: Mankind Cinemas; Symmetry Cinemas
- Release date: 11 February 2022 (Kerala)
- Running time: 152 minutes
- Country: India
- Language: Malayalam

Freedom Fight is a 2022 Indian Malayalam-language anthology film directed by a team of directors including Jeo Baby, Kunjila Mascillamani, Jithin Issac Thomas, Akhil Anilkumar, Francies Louis. The cast includes Rajisha Vijayan, Joju George, Rohini, Sidhartha Siva, and Srindaa. The film was released on OTT, streamed through SonyLIV from 11 February 2022.

== Short films ==
Ep.	Name	Director	Cast	Writer	Cinematography	Editor	Music director
1	Geethu Unchained	Akhil Anilkumar	Rajisha Vijayan, Renjit Sekhar Nair, Nilja K Baby, SruthySuresh	Akhil Anilkumar	Himal Mohan	Mushin PM	Maathan
2	Asanghadithar	Kunjila Mascillamani	Srindaa, Viji Penkoottu,	Kunjila Mascillamani	Salu K Thomas	Kunjila Mascillamani	Basil C J
3	Ration	Francies Louis	Jeo Baby, Kabani, Mini I G	Francies Louis, Vishnu K Udayan	Nikhil S Praveen	Francies Louis	Tony Babu, MPSE
4	Old Age Home	Jeo Baby	Joju George, Rohini, Lali PM	Jeo Baby	Salu K Thomas	Francies Louis	Mathews Pulickan
5	Pra. Thoo. Mu.	Jithin Issac Thomas	Sidhartha Siva, Unni Lalu, R Bala	Jithin Issac Thomas	Himal Mohan	Rohit VS Variyath	Arun Vijay

== Reception ==
Manoj Kumar R. of The Indian Express gave the film 3.5 stars out of 5 and stated "All of the movies deal with some of the most important social problems of the country. And each of these films is narrated from the point of view of those who are less fortunate and who always end up getting a raw deal in the rigid power structure of our society."

Writing in Firstpost, Anna M. M. Vetticad stated, "The Great Indian Kitchen’s director presents a solid anthology with a glaring blemish." She later ranked it fourth in her year-end list of best Malayalam films.
