= Sreedhanya Catering Service =

2022 Indian drama film

Sree Dhanya Catering Service
- Theatrical release poster
- Directed by: Jeo Baby
- Written by: Jeo Baby
- Produced by: Dijo Augustine; Jomon Jacob; Sajin S. Raj; Vishnu Rajan
- Cinematography: Salu K Thomas
- Edited by: Francies Louis
- Music by: Basil C J; Mathews Pulickan
- Production companies: Mankind Cinemas; Symmetry Cinemas
- Release date: 26 August 2022
- Running time: 98 minutes
- Country: India
- Language: Malayalam

Sree Dhanya Catering Service is a 2022 Indian Malayalam-language comedy-drama film written and directed by Jeo Baby.

== Plot ==
It all happens over two days, and the evening/night in between. Friends gather in a house to help cook biryani, for a baby's birthday lunch. Who shows up to help, how they gather around, and how they spend the night forms the story line.

== Cast ==
- Prasant Murali as Shino
- Jeo Baby as Siby
- Sumesh Moor as Martin
- Rahul Reghu
- Gilu Joseph
- Beena Jeo
- Phantom Praveen

== Production ==
Filming took place in various locations, around Kerala, India. The director and crew worked to incorporate elements of culture and cuisine authentic to the region.

== Release ==
Speaking to the press before the release, the director Jeo Baby stated "Sreedhanya Catering Service’: It's about men cooking, and everything that is brewing".

== Reception ==
Indian Express Malayalam reviewed the film, praising the realistic scenes, fun, and music, but critiqued its content as insufficient for a feature film.
