= Adish Praveen =

Indian actor (born 2008)

- Born: August 4, 2008 (age 18); Perumbavoor, Kerala, India
- Occupation: Actor
- Years active: 2015—present
- Awards: National Film Award for Best Child Artist

Adish Praveen, also known as Master Adish (born 4 August 2008) is an Indian actor working in the Malayalam film industry, known for films such as Iblis (2018), Kunju Daivam (2018) and Driving License (2019). (Note: Multiple resources based on movies.) He won the National Award for Best Child Artist in 2017 for the film Kunju Daivam.

== Filmography ==
Year	Film	Role	Note	Ref.
2015	Ben	Chaami	Debut film	
2016	Oru Muthassi Gadha	Pittosh		
2016	Kattappanayile Rithwik Roshan	Young Kichu		
2018	Street Lights	Mani		
2018	Kunju Daivam	Joseph / Ousepachan	Won National Film Award for Best Child Artist	
2018	Chakkaramavin Kombath	Kuttu		
2018	Mohanlal	Sabu		
2018	Iblis	Musthafa		
2018	Thattumpurath Achuthan	Kunjoottan		
2019	Margamkali	School student		
2019	Manoharam	Young Prabhu		
2019	Driving Licence	Jinto		
2020	Big Brother	Young Khani		
2022	Sundari Gardens	Kanthan		
2023	Uppumaavu			
2024	Idiyan Chandhu	Young Chandhu		
2024	Pallotty 90's Kids	Bubblegum Subhish		
2025	Abhilasham	Young Ajesh		
2026	Dhoomakethu			
