= Varthamanam =

2021 Malayalam film

- Directed by: Sidhartha Siva
- Written by: Aryadan Shoukath
- Produced by: Benzy Nazar; Aryadan Shoukath
- Starring: Parvathy Thiruvothu; Roshan Mathew; Siddique
- Edited by: Shameer Muhammed
- Music by: Songs: Ramesh Narayan; Hesham Abdul Wahab; Score: Bijibal
- Production company: Benzy Productions
- Release date: 12 March 2021
- Country: India
- Language: Malayalam

Varthamanam is a 2021 Indian Malayalam-language social drama film directed by Sidhartha Siva, stars Parvathy Thiruvothu, Roshan Mathew and Siddique. The film is produced by Benzy Nazar and Aryadan Shoukath under Benzy productions, written by Aryadan Shoukath.

== Plot ==
Faiza Sufiya joins Delhi University as a research student who is researching on Abdurahiman Sahib, a freedom fighter from Malabar. She gets acquainted with Amal and other students with a sharp political stance. Her roommate was a student from one of the scheduled castes, Tulsa and she is the first one from her community to acquire higher studies. The activists and the anti-fascists of the university are protesting for the rights of Rohan, one of the students from scheduled caste. Faiza also becomes a part of it. The friends then jointly go for the wedding of Tulsa's brother.

The Fascists of the university begin to go against them after the seminar conducted by Faiza. However, the dynamics of campus life take new forms after the killing of her roommate's brother, for killing a cow. The entire students of the university led by Faiza and her friends except for the fascist supporters stand for Tulsa, who had returned home after the tragic incident in her family.

Following the humiliation and injustice faced by the backward communities and with the support from Pothuvaal, they decide to perform a skit supporting them and to make the other students realise those difficulties.

As the other members of the team cannot be attacked, Faiza becomes the target of the fascists. They fabricate accusations on her to be an anti-nationalist. Due to the accusations she is declared to be an anti-nationalist worldwide. Soon they are on the run to save Faiza from those false accusations. Although they tried their best, Faiza gets arrested by the Police. But it was not officially recorded.

Amal, Aadarsh and Pothuvaal along with Faiza's grandfather, who was also a freedom fighter together take efforts to find Faiza. Due to mass media effect, the Police had to reveal Faiza's arrest and she produced in the court. In the last minute for the skit, the fascists get the skit members arrested, so that the skit won't take place. To the utter dismay of the fascists, finally the skit is partially conducted by Amal and Aadarsh. The police and the fascists stop them from completing it. At that exact time Faiza reaches the stage and completes the skit.

== Cast ==
- Parvathy Thiruvothu as Faiza Sufiya
- Roshan Mathew as Amal
- Siddique as Prof. Satheesh Pothuvaal
- Karuna Singh Chauhan as Tulsa
- Sanju Sivram as Aadarsh
- Dain Davis
- Anirudh Pavithran as pro-Hindutva student leader
- Nirmal Palazhi as Haris
- Sudheesh as Dean
- Jeo Baby as Advocate
- Rudra Aura as Rohan
- Aurora Adya
- Raveena Nair
- Balaji Mishra
- Himanshu Dhankhar as Vaishnav
- Sanju Sanichen

== Production ==
After directing Sakhavu (2017), Sidhartha Siva announced Varthamanam with Parvathy Thiruvothu and Roshan Mathew in leading roles. Rafeeq Ahmed and Vishal Johnson wrote the lyrics while Ramesh Narayan and Hesham Abdul Wahab signed to compose the music. Cinematography was handled by Alagappan and editing was done by Shameer Muhammed. Anusha Appukuttan Assistant Director, The story and screenplay is written by Aryadan Shoukath while background scores are done by Bijibal.

The filming of Varthamanam started in March 2020 and the major portions of the film were shot in North India and regions of Mussoorie.

== Release and controversy ==
The regional body of Central Board of Film Certification (CBFC) in Kerala has denied the permission of screening to the film without citing for any reason for rejection. Later V. Sandeep Kumar, an official of the CBFC who is also a BJP leader said that "he denied clearance for the movie as the movie's screenwriter and producer is Aryadan Shoukath" - who is a Muslim - and he found the theme of the film was "anti-national". Kerala state film academy chairman and director Kamal demanded the removal of Sandeep Kumar for his controversial remarks.

The film received clearance after the revising committee approval. The film had theatrical release on 12 March 2021.

== Reception ==
The film had positive responses from audience and critics. The Update Rated the film 3/5 and stated that "The Writer makes a bold attempt to expose the political and racism issues we had today and he almost succeed in that".
