= Basil C J =

Indian music composer, lyricist and poet

- ബേസിൽ സി ജെ
- Born: Basil C J
- Occupations: Music composer; Lyricist
- Years active: 2012–present
- Musical career
- Genres: Film score; Western classical; Jazz; Indian classical; Folk; Electronic

Basil C J (Malayalam: ബേസിൽ സി ജെ) is an Indian music composer, lyricist, singer and poet who works primarily in the Malayalam film industry. He has worked on several Malayalam films across different genres, including Aattam (2023), 1956, Central Travancore (2019) and Ithiri Neram (2025).

== Career ==
Basil composed the background score for Aattam (2023), directed by Anand Ekarshi, which won three National Film Awards including Best Feature Film, Best Screenplay and Best Editing. In 2025, he composed the songs and background score for Ithiri Neram, directed by Prasanth Vijay. He also wrote the lyrics for all the songs in the film.

He received a Jury Mention for Best Soundtrack at the 32nd Cinema Jove – Valencia International Film Festival in 2017 for the music of Sexy Durga.

In addition to his work as a composer, Basil is also a lyricist who has written lyrics for various Malayalam songs. His song "Neeyorikkal" from Ithiri Neram was noted for its poetic quality. His other lyric credits include "Nee Vasantha Kaalam" and "Indheevarangal", among others.

== Filmography ==
=== As composer ===
Year	Film	Language	Songs	Score	Notes
2014	Oraalppokkam	Malayalam	Yes	Yes	Credited as Basil Joseph
2015	Ozhivudivasathe Kali	Malayalam	Yes	Yes	Credited as Basil Joseph
2017	Ayaal Sassi	Malayalam	Yes	Yes	
2017	Eli Eli Lama Sabachthani	Multilingual		Yes	Credited as Basil Joseph
2017	Athisayangalude Venal	Malayalam	Yes	Yes	
2017	S Durga (Sexy Durga)	Malayalam	Yes	Yes	
2019	Chola	Malayalam	Yes		
2019	1956, Central Travancore	Malayalam	Yes	Yes	Cameo appearance also
2020	Santhoshathinte Onnam Rahasyam	Malayalam	Yes		
2022	Freedom Fight	Malayalam	Yes		
2022	Sreedhanya Catering Service	Malayalam	Yes		
2023	Family	Malayalam	Yes	Yes	
2023	Aattam	Malayalam	Yes	Yes	
2025	Ithiri Neram	Malayalam	Yes	Yes	

=== As lyricist ===
Year	Film	Language
2014	Oraalppokkam	Malayalam
2017	S Durga	Malayalam
2019	Chola	Malayalam
2023	Aattam	Malayalam
2025	Ithiri Neram	Malayalam

=== As playback singer ===
Year	Song	Film	Language
2019	"Athimodham"	Chola	Malayalam

== Discography ==
No.	Song	Film	Year	Lyrics	Singers
1	"Cells and Consciousness"	Oraalppokkam	2014	Basil C J	Rinu Sreenivasan
2	"Karimegham"	Ozhivudivasathe Kali	2015	Sanal Kumar Sasidharan	Nidhin Lal
3	"Shappu Kariyum"	Ozhivudivasathe Kali	2015	Sanal Kumar Sasidharan	Karinthalakkottam
4	"The Late Night Girl"	Avalkoppam	2016	Basil C J	Anju Brahmasmi
5	"Shashippatt"	Ayaal Sassi	2017	Vinayakumar V	Vineeth Sreenivasan
6	"Akkane Thikkane"	Ayaal Sassi	2017	Vinayakumar V	Sreenivasan
7	"Olichoraakasham"	S Durga	2017	Basil C J	Jayakrishnan S
8	"Vinodha Jeevitham"	S Durga	2017	Basil C J	Jayakrishnan S
9	"Kaadu"	S Durga	2017	Basil C J	Jayakrishnan S
10	"Athimodham"	Chola	2019	Basil C J	Basil C J
11	"Nee Vasantha Kalam"	Chola	2019	Basil C J	Harish Sivaramakrishnan, Sithara Krishnakumar
12	"Malpriyanadha"	1956, Central Travancore	2019	Kocheeppan Tharakan	Vijeesh Lal
13	"Erum Vadiyum"	1956, Central Travancore	2019	Sherin Catherine	Various artists
14	"Pakalukal"	Santhoshathinte Onnam Rahasyam	2020	Sherin Catherine	Sithara Krishnakumar
15	"Chatteem Panem"	Freedom Fight	2022	Rahel	Vaikom Vijayalakshmi
16	"Mind il Pint"	Sreedhanya Catering Service	2022	Suhail Koya	Sannidhanandhan
17	"Indheevarangal"	Aattam	2023	Basil C J	K. S. Chithra
18	"Neeyorikkal"	Ithiri Neram	2025	Basil C J	Viswajith C T, Sithara Krishnakumar
19	"Akalunnu Melle"	Ithiri Neram	2025	Basil C J	Sooraj Santhosh, Chithra Arun
20	"Nishayil"	Ithiri Neram	2025	Basil C J	Veetraag
21	"Theeram Thodaathe"	Ithiri Neram	2025	Basil C J	Sooraj Santhosh, Mridula Warrier
22	"Madhuramoorunna"	Ithiri Neram	2025	Basil C J	Kapil Kapilan

== Awards and nominations ==
Year	Award	Category	Film	Result
2017	32nd Cinema Jove – Valencia International Film Festival	Jury Mention for Best Soundtrack	Sexy Durga	Won
