= Kannur Sreelatha =

Indian actress

- Born: India
- Occupation: Actress
- Years active: 1983–present
- Spouse: Late Mr. Vinod

Kannur Sreelatha is an Indian actress from Kannur who is best known for her work in Malayalam cinema. Making her debut with the movie Prashnam Gurutharam, directed by Balachandra Menon, she has acted in many stage plays before entering into the film field.

== Personal life ==
Sreelatha is the eldest of four children born to theater artists Rajan, and Vasanthy, at Muzhappilangattu, Kannur, Kerala. She has two brothers and a sister. Her father owned a drama troupe, Raja Theaters, in which she and her mother used to act, before she later went on to act in other drama troupes like Alavil Deshiya Kalasamithi at the age of 13. Her education came from Kannur Girls High School.

Sreelatha is married to Vinod; they have no children. As well as appearing in many films over the course of thirty years, she is also acting in Tele films and soap operas. Currently Sreelatha resides at Pallikkunnu, Kannur with family.

== Awards ==
- 1981–1982 Kerala State Theater Artist Award for the drama Nandi Veendum Varika
- Nana Television Best Actress Award

== Filmography ==
- Snehasammanam (1982)
- Naseema (1983)
- Prasnam Gurutharam (1983) as Balu's Murapennu
- Kanamarayathu (1984) as Sreedevi
- Ente Upasana (1984) as Sreekumar's wife
- April 18 (1984) as Elsy
- Enganeyundashane (1984) as Alice
- Sandarbham (1984) as Dr. Rachel
- Appunni (1984)
- Veendum Chalikkunna Chakram (1984) as Joseph's sister
- Aarorumariyaathe (1984)
- Manyamahajanangale (1985)
- Thammil Thammil (1985) as Sunitha
- Muhoortham 11:30 (1985) as Reetha
- Punnaaram Chollicholli (1985)
- Oru Nokku Kanan (1985) as Rajani
- Onathumbikkoroonjal (1985)
- Katha Ithuvare (1985) as Sheela
- Chekkeranoru Chilla (1986) as Sujatha
- Irakal (1986) as Roslin
- Ee Shabdham Ennathe Shabdham (1986)
- Meenamaasathile Sooryan (1986) as Kalyani
- Neram Pularumbol (1987)
- Ithrayum Kaalam (1987) as Sreedevi
- Rajakeeyam (1995)
- Hitler Brothers (1996)
- Mr.Clean (1996) as Nurse
- Kilikurissiyile Kudumbamela (1997) as Alice
- Snehadoothu (1997)
- The Good Boys (1997)
- Snehasindooram (1997)
- Sammaanam (1997) as Aminamma
- Panchaloham (1998)
- Ilamura Thamburan (1998) as Vilasini
- Kottaram Veettile Apputtan(1998) as Sarojini
- Kalaapam (1998)
- British Market (1998)
- Harthal (1998)
- Malabaril Ninnoru Manimaaran (1998) as Damayanthi
- Njangal Santhushtaranu(1999)
- Ayal Kathayezhuthukayannu (1999) as Priya's valiyamma
- Kannezhuthi Pottum Thottu(1999) as Rosakutty
- Garshom (1999)
- Mimics Ghost (1999)
- Ustaad (1999)
- Pattaabhishekam (1999) as Bhanu
- Deepasthambham Mahascharyam (2000)
- Swayamvarappanthal (2000) as Malathy
- Nalacharitham Naalam Divasam (2001) as Pushpan's wife
- Uthaman (2001)
- Naranathu Thampuran (2001)
- Chandanamarangal (2001) as Shesha Iyer's wife
- Chithrathoonukal (2001) as Ranjith's mother
- Pakalppooram (2002)
- Grand Mother (2002)
- Neelakasham Niraye (2002) as Sainabha
- Ente Ammakku (2003)
- Malsaram (2003)
- Thaamara (2003) as Thaamara's mother
- War & Love (2003) as Omana
- Shinkari Bolona (2003)
- Melvilaasam Shariyaanu (2003) as Nandakumar's mother
- Gaurisankaram (2003)
- Ee Snehatheerathu(2004) as Gayathri's mother
- Masangudi Mannadiyar Speaking (2004)
- Kusruthy (2004) as Pearly
- Agninakshathram (2004) as Village lady
- Ullam (2005)
- Swapnangalil Haisel Mary (2008)
- Meghatheertham (2009)
- Bhoomi Malayalam (2009)
- Njaan Sanchaari (2010)
- Mukham Moodikal (2012) as Devakiyamma
- Ivan Megharoopan (2012) as Padmavthi
- Swaha (2014) as Sreedevi's mother
- Pedithondan (2014)
- To Noora with Love (2014) as Nun
- The Reporter (2015) as Mother Superior
- Love Land (2015) as Raman's wife
- Nikhah (2015) as Khadeeja
- Pravasalokam (2016) as Subaidha's mother
- Ende Vellithooval (2016)
- Peythozhinju
- Muttayi Kallanum Mammaliyum (2019)
- Vellam (2021)
- Neela Chela as Myili
- Chatmates as Amina
- Thaniyye
- Parppidam
- Ka
- Mathilakam
- Urava
- Sukheshettanu Pennu Kittunnilla

== Television career ==
- Karthika (Doordarshan)
- Alakal (Doordarshan)
- Sreeraman Sreedevi (Asianet)
- Snehanjali (Asianet)
- Amma Manassu (Asianet)
- Thanichu (Asianet)
- Minnukettu (Surya TV)
- Aalippazham (Surya TV)
- Melottu Pozhiyunna Ilakal
- Uthareeyam (Telefilm)
- Amrithavarshini (Telefilm)
- Sr.Maria Celine The Servant of God (Telefilm)
- Thacholi Kathayile Chappan
- Pakida Pakida Pambaram
- Kadavu
- Kalpitham
- Mayamadhavam (Surya TV)
- Mohakkadal (Surya TV)
- Rudraveena (Surya TV)
- Manthrakodi (Asianet)
- Chodyam Utharam
- Nonachi Paru (Asianet)
- Amma Maanasam (Asianet)
- Ival Yamuna (Mazhavil Manorama)
- Daya (Kairali TV)
- Nirapara (Advertisement)

== Dramas ==
- Iniyum Unarathavar
- Nandi Veendum Varika

== Radio ==
- Ezhuthupetty
