= Ee Snehatheerathu =

- Directed by: Kaviyoor Sivaprasad
- Screenplay by: Ramakrishnan
- Story by: Ramakrishnan
- Produced by: M. Prasad
- Starring: Kunchacko Boban; Uma Shankari; Jaya Prada; Lal; Nedumudi Venu
- Cinematography: K. N. Nambiar
- Edited by: Beena Paul; Vijayakumar
- Music by: L. Subramaniam
- Release date: 27 August 2004
- Country: India
- Language: Malayalam

Ee Snehatheerathu (transl.In this Shore of Ocean of Love) is a 2004 Indian Malayalam film. It is directed by Kaviyoor Sivaprasad and written by Ramakrishnan. The movie stars Kunchacko Boban, Uma Shankari, Lal, Nedumudi Venu and Jagathy Sreekumar. Kunchacko Boban won the Special Jury Award at the Kerala State Film Awards for this movie.

== Plot ==
Viswanathan (Kunchacko Boban) who is idealistic to a fault. He is suspicious of an evildoer but kind-hearted Gounder (Lal). Nathan's father Sasthri (Nedumudi Venu) has been enjoying Gounder's largesse but Nathan refuses to believe that it comes no strings attached. It makes him fiercely protective of his mother (Jayaprada) and sister (Suja Karthika).

Nathan teaches at a "parallel college" where his student (Uma Shankari) falls for his charm. Though Nathan works in parallel college, he tries to seek a better job to make sure his family situation and to help his sister's higher studies. Nathan gets a frequent nightmare about his mother weds the Gounder cheating his father. After Nathan has consecutive nightmares, Nathan's father has a heart attack and dies. Due to this incident, Nathan becomes insane on Gounder and attacks him brutally. Nathan's mother discovered his mental condition and the insecurity towards the Gounder's attitude with his mother. Later Nathan was admitted into a mental asylum. Gayathri came to meet Nathan, but he doesn't react. Then black screen appeared...

== Cast ==
- Kunchacko Boban as Vishwanathan
- Umashankari Sumithra as Gayathri
- Jaya Prada as Lekshmi, Vishwanathan's Mother
- Lal as Chinnappa Gounder
- Ravi Menon as Krishnamoorthy, Gayathri's Father
- Kannur Sreelatha as Radhika, Gayathri's Mother
- Nedumudi Venu as Sashtri, Vishwanathan's Father
- Jagathy Sreekumar as Parasheri
- Suja Karthika as Divya, Vishwanathan's Sister
- Sudheesh as Ganesh
- Arun as Murugan, Chinnappa Gounder's brother
- Cochin Haneefa as Subbramanian

== Soundtrack ==
It was Kavita Krishnamoorthy first, only and Last songs in Malayalam film industry till date.she has sung four songs for the Movie.

All songs were composed by Dr. L. Subramaniam, with lyrics by S. Ramesan Nair.

#	Song title	Singer(s)
1	"Sada Manathil Vazhum"	Kavita Krishnamoorthy
2	"Udhayardra Kiranangal"	Kavita Krishnamoorthy
3	"Adimaha Manasin"	M. G. Sreekumar, Kavita Krishnamoorthy
4	"Siva Siva"	M. G. Sreekumar, Kavita Krishnamoorthy
5	"Pakalin Chithayeriyum"	M. G. Sreekumar
