= 101 Chodyangal =

- Official poster
- Directed by: Sidhartha Siva
- Written by: Sidhartha Siva
- Produced by: Thomas Kottakkakam
- Starring: Indrajith Sukumaran; Lena; Minon
- Cinematography: Prabhath E K
- Edited by: Bibin Paul Samuel
- Music by: Bijibal
- Production company: Seventh Paradise
- Release date: April 2013 (Kerala)
- Country: India
- Language: Malayalam

101 Chodyangal (English: 101 Questions) is a 2013 Indian Malayalam-language film written and directed by Sidhartha Siva. At the 60th National Film Awards, the film won the awards for Best Debut Film of a Director and Best Child Artist for Minon. It also won the Silver Crow Pheasant Award for Best Feature Film (Audience Prize) at the 18th International Film Festival of Kerala.

The story is set in Kaviyoor, Tiruvalla, the director's hometown in Kerala, which inspired the film. The plot revolves around a school assignment given to a class V student as his family's economic situation is unravelling.

The film was slated to release in theatres in April 2013.

== Plot ==
A class V student is given an assignment to frame 101 questions. The film is about the efforts he has to put in to create those questions. At this point, his father, a factory employee, loses his job. The two parallel streams converge at the end.

== Cast ==
- Indrajith Sukumaran as Mukundan
- Minon as Anilkumar Bokaro
- Lena as Sati
- Nishanth Sagar as Radhakrishnan
- Sudheesh as Vijayan
- Baby Diya as Anagha
- Rachana Narayanankutty as Deepa
- Murugan as Sivanandan
- Manikandan Pattambi
- Kalabhavan Rahman
