= Adwaith Shine =

Indian photo- and cinematographer

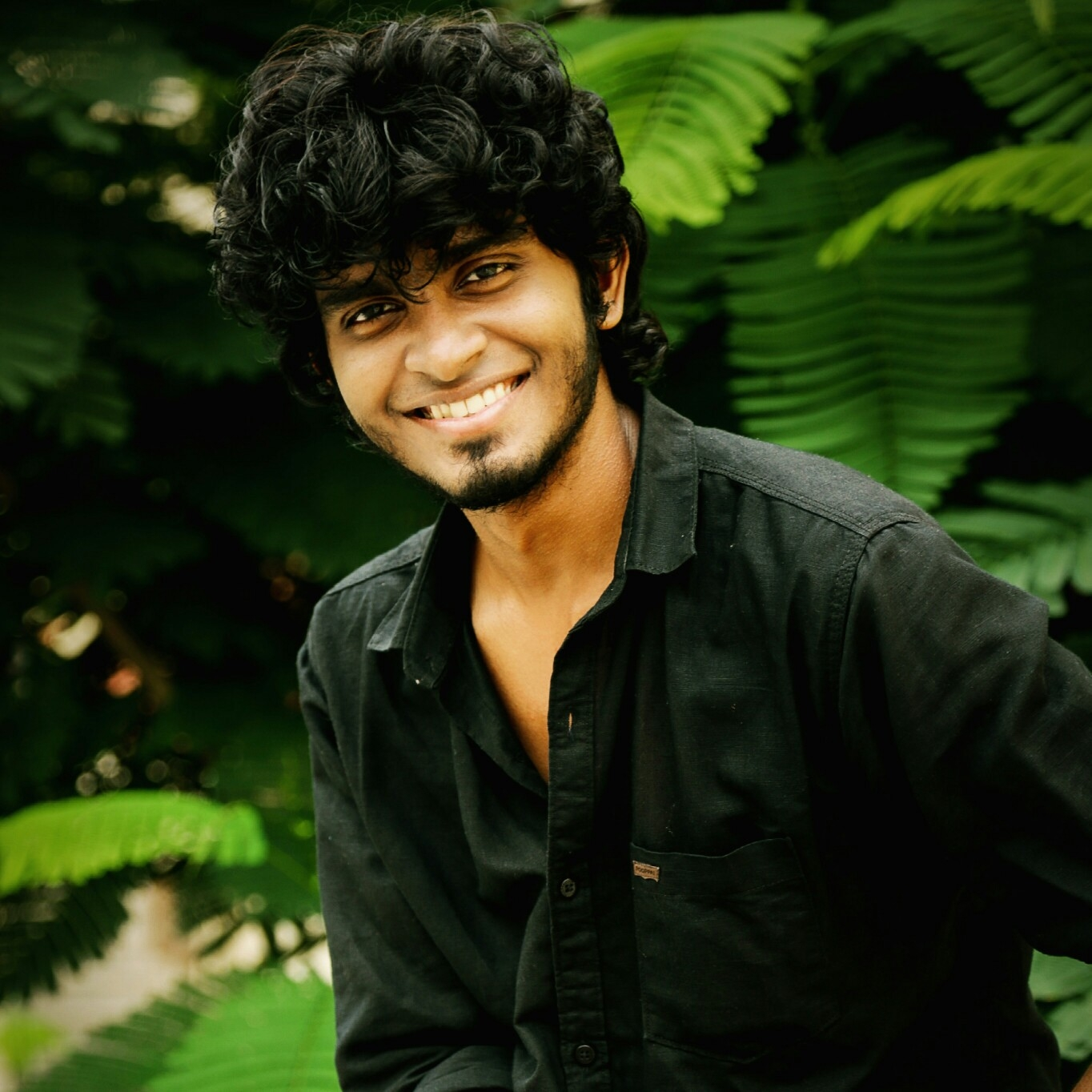
- Born: 26 October 1994 (age 32); Kottayam, Kerala, India
- Occupations: Fashion photographer Advertising photographer Film director Cinematographer
- Website: http://www.adwaithshine.com/

Adwaith Shine is a commercial photographer, film director, and cinematographer, who works in the Malayalam film industry.

He began working as a cinematographer at age 20, and made his debut as a head cinematographer with 2 Penkuttikal in 2016, which won a Kerala State Film Award.

He is one of the youngest approved members of the Film Employees Federation of Kerala and the Cinematographers Union Of Malayalam Cinema. He studied a BSc in Director of Photography film technology, and a master's degree in cinematography under G.P. Krishna and J. Robert Asirvatham.

== Early life ==
Adwaith Shine was born on 26 October 1994 in Bharananganam, Kottayam District, Kerala. During his school days, he used to practice photography with a basic non-reflex camera. He took a keen interest in cameras, and an interest in film making after acting in a documentary film about Saint. Alphonsa in the 7th grade.

After graduating from Alphonsa Residential School, he began a BSc in Director of Photography Film Technology at SRM Sivaji Ganeshan School of Film Studies in Chennai.

Following his passion in photography, he attended Udaan School of Photography in Mumbai to master the basics of photography from veteran photojournalist and photographer Arko Datta.

After participating in various advertising photography classes and workshops conducted by Indian commercial photographers, he returned to Chennai to spend another year in the Muybridge Film School to learn advanced motion picture and imaging technologies under G.P. Krishna.

== Career ==
Adwaith Shine started his career acting in feature films, documentaries and short films. He got his first professional camera after joining the Film Institute. He created small short films as a part of his studies.

His short film 'Murivunangum Munbe' was screened on NDTV and he acted in a short film titled 'NILA' which has been screened at various short film festivals. At the age of 20, he produced his first feature film, '2 Penkuttikal'. His personal portrait photography project on the homeless elderly has been published in Deccan Chronicle, titled "Capturing the Many Faces of Joy".

He have worked as Chief Fashion and Celebrity Photographer for Kerala Fashion League and Indian Fashion League. On 9 August he was officially commissioned by the Government of India to photograph President Shri Ram Nath Kovind, the First Lady, Governor, and the Lady Governor, during their official visit to Kerala. Adwaith now works as a Director of Photography on various television commercials commissioned by film production houses in Kerala, as well as for advertising agencies. His first directorial debut feature film, "Vahni", features his own mother as the lead heroine. He served as Director and Director of Photography on his feature film "Atreyi", which was officially selected at the 2018 Fashion Film Festival in Chicago.

== Filmography ==
- Director of Photography - 2 Penkuttikal
- Director - Vahni. Released in 2020
- Director and Director of Photography - Atreyi
