= Ithiri Neram =

Indian film

- Theatrical release poster
- Directed by: Prasanth Vijay
- Written by: Vishak Shakti
- Produced by: Jomon Jacob; Dijo Augustine; Einstin Zac Paul; Vishnu Rajan; Sajin S Raj
- Starring: Roshan Mathew; Zarin Shihab; Nandu; Anand Manmadhan; Jeo Baby
- Cinematography: Rakesh Dharan
- Edited by: Francies Louis
- Music by: Basil C J
- Production companies: Mankind Cinemas, Einstin Media, Symmetry Cinemas
- Release date: 7 November 2025
- Running time: 137 minutes
- Country: India
- Language: Malayalam

Ithiri Neram is a 2025 Indian Malayalam language romantic drama film directed by Prasanth Vijay and written by Vishak Shakti. The film stars Roshan Mathew and Zarin Shihab in the lead roles, with supporting performances by Nandu, Anand Manmadhan and Jeo Baby.

== Plot ==
The narrative follows Anish (Roshan Mathew), a podcast host who, on the eve of his daughter's baptism, plans a night out with friends. Unexpectedly, he receives a call from his former college lover Anjana (Zarin Shihab), who is soon leaving for the United States. Their chance reunion leads to candid conversations and emotional confrontations over the course of one night, exploring themes of love, memory, closure and the lingering impact of past relationships.

== Cast ==
- Roshan Mathew as Anish Thomas
- Zarin Shihab as Anjana S Kumar
- Nandu as Rajan Kunnukuzhi
- Anand Manmadhan as Chanchal Kachani
- Jeo Baby as Sanal

== Production ==
The idea for the film originated from a Facebook post by a journalist describing a real-life incident involving a man and a woman over the course of a night. Director Prasanth Vijay and writer Vishak Shakti adapted this incident into a fictional narrative, developing backstories for the central characters and introducing additional supporting characters. The film was produced by Jomon Jacob, Dijo Augustine, Einstin Zac Paul, Vishnu Rajan and Sajin S Raj and presented by Jeo Baby. Cinematography was handled by Rakesh Dharan, visual effects by Sumesh Sivan with music composed by Basil C J who has also penned the lyrics.

== Release ==
Ithiri Neram premiered in cinemas in India on 7 November 2025. After its theatrical run, the film was released on SunNXT on 31 December 2025 and Prime Video on 2 January 2026.

== Critical reception ==
Writing for The Week, Sajin Shrijith described the film as being "laden with poignant moments and humour," noting that the two lead actors complement Prasanth Vijay's direction with "stirring performances" that appeal to both the heart and intellect. In The Hindu, S. R. Praveen characterised the film as a "deeply felt conversational drama," observing that Vijay crafts the narrative with an "uncommon turn" that distinguishes it from more conventional romantic films.

Janani K, reviewing the film for India Today, referred to it as "a mature, nuanced take on love, loss and second chances," calling it a bittersweet drama anchored by the performances of Roshan Mathew and Zarin Shihab. Anna Mathews of The Times of India echoed this sentiment, writing that Ithiri Neram "breaks the mould of today’s style of filmmaking" and suggesting that its approach could appeal to audiences across generations. She highlighted the film's "brave decision to take the narrative at a slow pace," commending its script and direction and noting that the story of lost love was "beautifully woven," with strong performances that kept viewers engaged throughout.

Vishal Menon of The Hollywood Reporter India wrote that the film leaves viewers feeling "the pleasures of returning to a dreamlike moment in the past and the pain that only long-lost love can make you feel," highlighting the chemistry between the lead actors and the film's nostalgic tone. Vivek Santhosh of The New Indian Express described it as "a tender and talk-heavy drama," praising its sincerity and the emotional weight carried by its performances. In The Indian Express, Anandu Suresh noted that while the film follows narrative stylistics reminiscent of ’96, it differentiates itself through the way it "manages to instil a sense of tension" within its largely conversational framework.

Rasmi Binoy, writing for The News Minute, offered a positive assessment, stating that rather than forcing the audience to take a stand, the film presents "a scenario that could happen to any of us," and remarking that it "emphatically marks Prasanth Vijay’s arrival in the mainstream." A more critical perspective came from Maria Teresa Raju, also writing for The News Minute, who questioned certain narrative and emotional choices, expressing reservations about the film's thematic framing despite acknowledging the strength of its performances.

== Soundtrack ==
Ithiri Neram

Soundtrack album by Basil CJ
- Recorded: 2025
- Genre: Feature film soundtrack
- Length: 33:36
- Language: Malayalam
- Label: Think Music

The film's songs and background score were composed by Basil C J, who has also written the lyrics. The film has six songs.

Composer-lyricist Basil C J said that the album was crafted to mirror the film's core theme of memory and longing, with instrumentation such as sitar and flute chosen to create an organic, reflective sound. He explained that the song "Neeyorikkal" evolved intuitively from footage and discussions with the director, aiming for a conversational style that resonated with the film's mood.

No.	Title	Artist(s)	Length
1.	"Neeyorikkal"	Viswajith CT, Sithara Krishnakumar	6:21
2.	"Akalunnu Melle"	Sooraj Santhosh	5:20
3.	"Nishayil"	Veetrag	5:39
4.	"Theeram Thodaathe"	Sooraj Santhosh, Mridula Warrier	5:28
5.	"Madhuramoorunna"	Kapil Kapilan	5:28
6.	"Akalunnu Melle" (Duet version)	Sooraj Santhosh, Chithra Arun	5:20
Total length:			33:36
