= Iblis (film) =

- Theatrical release poster
- Directed by: Rohith V. S.
- Screenplay by: Sameer Abdul
- Story by: Rohith V. S.
- Produced by: Sreelekshmi R Bhupen Tacho; Jeetu Gogoi
- Starring: Asif Ali; Lal; Madonna Sebastian; Master Adish; Konapri; Siddique; Sreenath Bhasi; Saiju Kurup; Aju Varghese
- Cinematography: Akhil George
- Edited by: Shameer Muhammed
- Music by: Dawn Vincent
- Production company: Ichais Productions
- Distributed by: Adam's World of Imagination
- Release date: 3 August 2018
- Running time: 118 minutes
- Country: India
- Language: Malayalam

Iblis (lit. 'Iblis'; transl. Devil) is a 2018 Indian Malayalam-language fantasy comedy film directed by Rohith V. S. with Asif Ali and Madonna Sebastian starring. The film was produced by Ichais Productions. The film was released on 3 August 2018.

== Plot ==
Vaisakhan lives in an unknown land, playing music at the homes where someone has died. He is a carefree youth, who is madly in love with Fida. His concepts of death and afterlife have heavily been influenced by his "muthassan" or grandpa, Sreedharan.

This muthassan is a weird character who enjoys his life, travelling like a nomad. He is a funny character who even plans to make Vaisakhan and Fida fall in love.

== Cast ==
- Asif Ali as Vaishakan
  - Sreepath Yan as young Vaishakan
- Madonna Sebastian as Fida, love interest of Vaishakan
- Lal as Shreedharan,Vaishakan's grandfather
- Siddique as Jabbar
- Rugmini Amma as Beevi
- Saiju Kurup as Sukumaran
- Sreenath Bhasi as Attar merchant/Subair
- Master Adish as Musthafa
- Shivakumar Nair as Josettan
- Nazeer as Kelu
- Gokulan as Vareed
- Babu Annur as Sulaiman, Fida's father
- Surjith Gopinath as Puppetry artist
- Aju Varghese as King (cameo appearance)

== Production ==
Iblis is the second directorial of Rohith V. S. with Asif Ali after his debut film Adventures of Omanakuttan (2017). The film is set in the 1980s, Rohith describes the film a "musical adventure-comedy", planned on the lines of Jagga Jasoos. Rohith discussed the project with Asif during the filming of Adventures of Omanakuttan and also retained its co-writer Sameer Abdul and cinematographer Akhil George for Iblis. Asif too contributed to the script. It was produced by the company Ichais Productions, in their debut. Iblis has music composed by Dawn Vincent. A pooja function for the film was held in early March 2018.

== Release ==
The film was released on 3 August 2018. The film is available for home video through Amazon Prime Video and YouTube, which is upload by Goodwill Entertainments.
