= The Great Indian Kitchen (2023 film) =

2023 Tamil-language drama film

- Theatrical release poster
- Directed by: R. Kannan
- Written by: Savari; Jeevitha Suresh Kumar
- Based on: The Great Indian Kitchen by Jeo Baby
- Produced by: Durgaram Choudhary; Neel Choudhary
- Starring: Aishwarya Rajesh; Rahul Ravindran
- Cinematography: Balasubramaniem
- Edited by: Leo John Paul
- Music by: Jerry Silvester Vincent
- Production company: RDC Media
- Distributed by: Sakthi Film Factory; KKR Cinemas
- Release date: 3 February 2023
- Running time: 100 minutes
- Country: India
- Language: Tamil

The Great Indian Kitchen is a 2023 Tamil-language drama film directed by R. Kannan and produced by Durgaram Choudhary and Neel Choudhary under the banner of RDC Media. The film is an official remake of a 2021 Malayalam film of the same name. The film stars Aishwarya Rajesh and Rahul Ravindran in lead roles. The film's music and score is composed by debutant Jerry Silvester Vincent, with cinematography by Balasubramaniem and editing by Leo John Paul.

This is the second collaboration between Balasubramaniem and R. Kannan, after the 2008 film Jayamkondaan and Aishwarya Rajesh's first project with R. Kannan. The film was shot predominantly in Chennai.

The Great Indian Kitchen was released in theatres on 3 February 2023. The film was initially scheduled to be released in theatres on 29 November 2022, but got postponed.

== Plot ==
An educated dancer of Indian descent, raised in Australia, finds herself in an arranged marriage to a teacher in a very traditional and patriarchal Indian family. While the domestic routine of the Wife begins in the sweet bliss of a new marriage, things begin to go down south. The drudgery of the kitchen and its many unpleasantries - cleaning, filthy utensils and leaking taps - are left to the women while the men mostly indulge themselves with their phone or yoga. The family is so patriarchal that her mother-in-law hands the toothbrush to the father-in-law, while he is lounging by the verandah. The men eat their meals first and leave the place a mess without concern for how the women can eat food after them. Their convenience and comfort always come before consideration for their wives. While the new bride takes a while to adjust to these new surroundings and eventually somewhat makes peace with them, her mother-in-law goes to take care of her daughter who is seven months pregnant.

The whole responsibility of cooking, cleaning and other household chores falls to her. Her egotistical husband is inconsiderate of her needs and feelings. When she tells him that it hurts when having sex and asks for some foreplay, he remarks she seems to know everything on the topic and condescendingly tells her he should be attracted to her for foreplay, making her cry to sleep.

Her father-in-law forbids her from finding employment, citing that a woman in the house brings prosperity to the family. When she gets her periods, she is appalled to discover that the family's beliefs regarding menstruation are extremely regressive. She is asked to lock herself up all alone on the floor in a room, eat separately and wash all the things she touches. She is even asked to go stay with a relative or to sleep outside during those days.

While these events transpire, the Sabarimala Temple news goes on about the court's decision that menstruation is not an impurity and so women should be allowed to visit the temple. Many people, including the groom's family, do not approve of the verdict.

All these injustices boil over one day and end up with the wife throwing murky kitchen sink water on her husband and father-in-law and leaving the family for her freedom and dignity. The film ends with a scene showing her as an independent dance teacher portraying her pains through a dance while her ex-husband is married again and the second wife seems to meet the first one's fate.

== Cast ==
- Aishwarya Rajesh as wife, a dancer
- Rahul Ravindran as husband, a teacher
- Poster Nandakumar as father
- Yogi Babu as husband's friend
- Kalairani as aunt
- Sudha
- Mekha Rajan as Usha
- Jenny
- Nishant Ramakrishnan
- Shobia
- Latha
- Deepthi

== Production ==
The film was directed by R. Kannan. The technical crew includes Leo John Paul and Jerry Silvester Vincent as editor and musician respectively. Meanwhile, Balasubramaniem was brought in for the film's cinematography. Aishwarya Rajesh, Rahul Ravindran and Poster Nandakumar play the roles essayed by Nimisha Sajayan, Suraj Venjaramoodu and T. Suresh Babu in the original.

== Music ==
The Great Indian Kitchen

Soundtrack album by Jerry Silvester Vincent
- Released: 2023
- Recorded: 2023
- Genre: Feature film soundtrack
- Language: Tamil
- Label: Sony Music India
- Producer: Jerry Silvester Vincent

The soundtrack of the film was composed by newcomer Jerry Silvester Vincent to lyrics by Kabilan Vairamuthu and Dr. Kiruthiyaa. The album's audio rights were acquired by Sony Music India. The full album was released by Sony Music India on 24 January 2023.

Track listing
No.	Title	Lyrics	Singer(s)	Length
1.	"Siru Deivam"	Kabilan Vairamuthu	Lavita Lobo	3:04
2.	"Maaya Neer Vizhchiye"	Dr. Kiruthiyaa	Padmaja Sreenivasan	2:24
3.	"New Hopes" (Instrumental)	–	–	0:47
4.	"The Plight" (Instrumental)	–	–	1:18
5.	"Rage" (Instrumental)	–	–	1:01
6.	"Enough!" (Instrumental)	–	–	1:49
7.	"Closure" (Instrumental)	–	Padmaja Sreenivasan	2:21

== Release ==
=== Theatrical ===
The Great Indian Kitchen was released in theatres on 3 February 2023. The film was initially released theatrically on 29 November 2022, but got postponed. On 10 May 2022, the film was given a "U/A" certificate by Central Board of Film Certification. The distribution rights of the film in Tamil Nadu were acquired by K. K. Ramesh and B. Sakthivelan under the banner of KKR Cinemas and Sakthi Film Factory.

=== Home media ===
The post-theatrical streaming rights of the film were bought by ZEE5 while the satellite rights of the film was purchased by Zee Tamil and Zee Thirai. The film digitally premiered on ZEE5 on 3 March 2023.

== Reception ==
Logesh Ramachandran of The Times of India who gave 3.5 stars out of 5 stars after reviewing the film stated that,"The Great Indian Kitchen has stayed true to its original, and we have nothing to complain about its execution".

Sirinivasa Ramanujam of The Hindu after reviewing the film wrote "Even though the Malayalam original was consumed by a large audience on OTT platforms, a Tamil version might reach its intent to a newer set of audiences — and that's more than enough to make current-day practitioners of patriarchy sit up and take note".

Janani K of India Today who gave 2.5 stars out of 5 stars after reviewing the film stated that,"The minor change in the end act doesn't hold up well, thereby bringing down the desired impact".

Reviewing for The New Indian Express and Cinema Express, Chandhini R wrote "But as the credits roll, TGIK reiterates that a woman breaking out of patriarchy and making the people who thrive in the system get a liberal dose of the daily muck of an oppressive 'natural order' will always be satisfying". He gave the film 3 stars out of 5 stars.
