= Vembanad (film) =

- Poster
- Directed by: Prof. Sivaprasad
- Starring: Mahesh, Jayabharathi
- Music by: Louis Banks
- Release date: 1990
- Running time: 91 min
- Country: India
- Language: Malayalam

Vembanad is a 1990 Malayalam film, directed by Prof. Sivaprasad, starring K. P. A. C. Azeez, Mahesh and Jayabharathi in the lead roles. The screen play is written by Suresh Babu. The film also highlights the collaboration of acclaimed Indian film experts. cinematography is done by Ashwini Kaul, editing by Renu Saluja and music by Louis Banks. This experimental film without dialogues won Kerala State Film Award – Special Jury Award in 1990 and it was screened at the panorama section of 1991 Madras Film Festival. Film critic Kozhikodan included the film on his list of the 10 best Malayalam movies of all time.

== Cast ==
- K. P. A. C. Azeez
- Jayabharathi
- Ranjini
- T. N. Gopinathan Nair
- Babu Namboothiri
- Kaveri
- Thesni Khan
- Kuttyedathi Vilasini
