= Kaviyoor Sivaprasad =

Indian film director and screenwriter

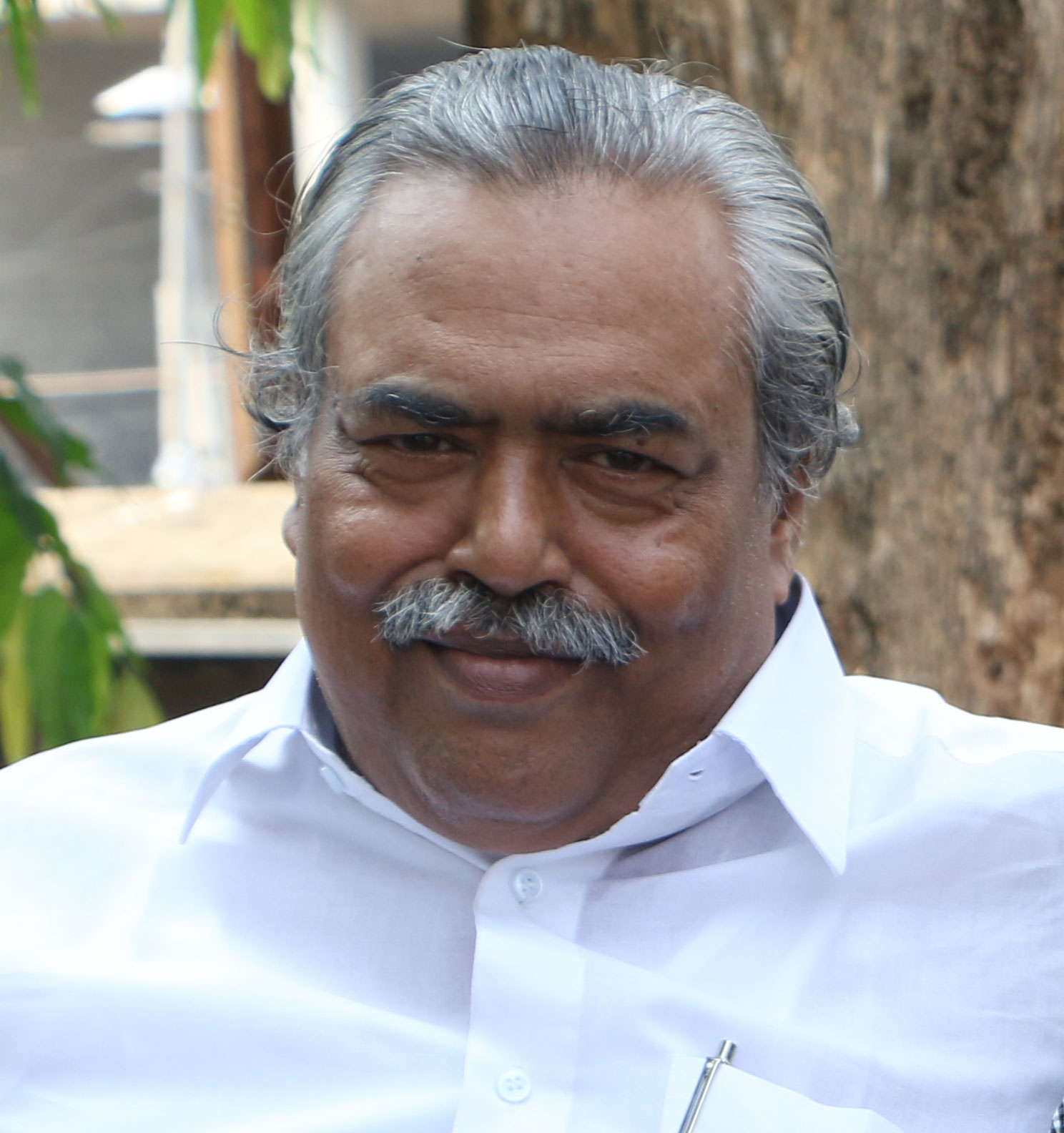
- Born: Kaviyoor Tiruvalla
- Occupations: Filmmaker, Professor
- Notable work: Vembanad, Gouri, Sthalam
- Children: Sidhartha Siva

Kaviyoor Sivaprasad is a Malayalam film director, screenwriter and visiting faculty of Malayalam University and SJCC. He is the father of actor-director Sidhartha Siva.

== Awards ==
- 2016: Chalachithra Prathiba Award by the Kerala Film Critics Association
- 2014: CMS Vatavaran International Environment & Wildlife Film Festival Award for Best Feature Film - Sthalam

National Film Awards

- 1994: National Film Award – Special Mention - Ormayude Theerangalil

Kerala State Film Awards

- 1990: Kerala State Film Award (Special Jury Award) - Vembanad
- 2000: Kerala State Film Award for Producer of the Best Documentary - Palathulliperuvallom

== Filmography ==
Year	Title
1981	Jalarekha
1985	Purooruvase
1987	Sairandhri
1990	Vembanad
1992	Gouri
2002	Bheri
2004	Ee Snehatheerathu
2012	Sthalam
2018	Sthaanam
