= Sidhartha Siva =

Indian director and screenwriter

- Occupations: Actor, director, scenarist
- Parent: Kaviyoor Sivaprasad (father)

Sidhartha Siva is an Indian film director, producer, actor, screenwriter and lyricist and who works in Malayalam cinema.

== Early life ==
His hometown is Kaviyoor, Pathanamthitta in Kerala. He is the son of filmmaker Kaviyoor Sivaprasad.

== Film career ==
He started his film career by directing telefilms and short films. He then appeared in Thirakkadha, Ivar Vivahitharayal, Bodyguard, Puthiya Theerangal, Kudumbasree Travels, Artist, Omega.Exe, Rithu, Tejabhaai & Family, Sahasram, Calendar, Sagar Elias Jacky, Radio Jockey, On the Way, Central Theater, Ayaalum Njanum Thammil, Vikramaadhithyan, Love 24 X 7, Kadhantharam , Kali, Take Off, Njandukalude Naattil Oridavela, Adam Joan, etc. He won his first National Film Awards at the 60th National Film Awards, he won the Indira Gandhi Award for Best Debut Film of a Director for his film 101 Chodyangal (2012). The film also won the Silver Crow Pheasant Award for Best Feature Film (Audience Prize) at the 18th International Film Festival of Kerala. 101 Chodyangal also won the best feature film award at Noida international film festival. Siva also won the Mohan Raghavan Award for Best Director, 2013. 101 Chodyangalwas also selected in Indian Panorama section at International Film Festival of India 2013.

In 2014, his film Zahir was screened at 19th Busan International Film Festival.

His film Ain won the best feature film in Malayalam at 62nd National Film Awards. Ain also won the prestigious Padmarajan Puraskaram for Best film and Best script. Ain bagged the Kerala State Film Award for best Story in 2014.

== Awards ==
National Film Awards

- 2013: Indira Gandhi Award for Best Debut Film of a Director - 101 Chodyangal
- 2015: Best Feature Film in Malayalam - Ain

Kerala State Film Awards

- 2015: Best Story - Ain
- 2020: Best Director - Ennivar

Other awards

- 2013: Silver Pheasant at the International Film Festival of Kerala - 101 Chodyangal
- 2014: John Abraham Cinema Award
- 2015: Chitra Bharathi Puraskar at the Bengaluru International Film Festival - Ain
- 2015: Padmarajan Puraskaram- Ain
- 2020: Best Director Kerala Film Critics Association Awards- Ennivar
- 2020: GARFI Award - Best Film Ennivar
- 2020: J C Daniel Foundation Award - Best Film Ennivar
- 2020: J C Daniel Foundation Award - Best Director Ennivar
- 2021: Padmarajan Puraskaram- Aanu

== Filmography ==
=== As director ===
Year	Title	Credits			Notes
Year	Title	Director	Producer	Writer	Notes
2012	101 Chodyangal	Yes	No	Yes	Winner, National Film Award for Best Debut film of a Director, Rajatha Chakoram at IFFK 2013, Indian Panorama
2013	Zahir	Yes	Yes	Yes	Selection, 19th BUSAN INTERNATIONAL FILM FESTIVAL, Best Director Jury Award Dada Saheb Phalkhe Film Festival
2014	Ain	Yes	Yes	Yes	Winner, National Film Award for Best Feature Film in Malayalam, PADMARAJAN Puraskaram, Kerala state award for best story,Indian Panorama, Chithra Bharathi Purasakar at Banglore International Film Festival - Best Indian Film - Jury
2015	Chathuram	Yes	Yes	Yes	40th Montreal World Film Festival Canada
2016	Kochavva Paulo Ayyappa Coelho	Yes	No	Yes	
2017	Sakhavu	Yes	No	Yes	
2020	Ennivar	Yes	Yes	Yes	Kerala state award for Best Director and Supporting Actor, Kerala Film Critics Association award for Best Director and supporting Actor, GARFI Award for Best Film, J C Daniel Foundation Award for Best Film, Best Director
2021	Aanu	Yes	Yes	No	Padmarajan Award for Best Director
2023	Varthamanam	Yes	No	No	

=== As actor ===
Year	Title	Role
2008	Thirakkatha	Sathyanarayaan
2009	Calendar	Sasikuttan
2009	Sagar Alias Jacky Reloaded	Sunny
2009	Ivar Vivahitharayal	Francis Kulirumkala
2009	Ritu	Pranchi
2010	Body Guard	Student
2010	Sahasram	Vınayan
2011	Kudumbasree Travels	Driver Rajappan
2011	Teja Bhai & Family	Blade
2011	Arjunan Saakshi	Sethu
2012	Ayalum Njanum Thammil	Dr Babuji
2012	Orange	Conductor
2012	Omega.exe	Krishnakumar
2012	Mullassery Madhavan Kutty Nemom P. O.	Shankar Nath
2012	Sthalam	Rameshan
2012	Puthiya Theerangal	Alappey Appachan
2013	Radio Jockey	Satheeshan
2013	Ginger	Cameo Appearance
2013	Black Forest	Cameo Appearance
2013	Artist	Curator Roy
2014	On the Way	Kishore
2014	Central Theater	Aldrin Peter
2014	Money Ratnam	Driver
2014	Vikramadithyan	'Advocate
2015	Ellam Chettante Ishtam Pole	Anali Saviour
2015	You Can Do	Prakashan
2015	Love 24x7	Nandhagopan
2016	Kadhantharam	Dr Roy
2016	Kali	Service centre Manager
2017	Njandukalude Nattil Oridavela	Cameo Appearance
2017	Aakashamittayee	Cameo Appearance
2017	Crossroad	Tomy Joseph
2017	Take Off	Cameo Appearance
2017	Adam Joan	Ajai
2018	Kunju Daivam	Priest
2018	Pretham 2	Ramananth Kalathingal
2018	Samaksham	Doctor
2018	Njan Marykutty	Advocate
2018	Kayamkulam Kochunni	British Advisor
2018	Ennaalum Sarath..?	Salam Parappanangady
2019	Janamaithri	Sunoj
2019	Maarconi Mathaai	Cameo Appearance
2019	Naan Petta Makan	Unni
2020	Mariyam Vannu Vilakkoothi	Boss
2020	Kilometers and Kilometers	Veerbhai/Sunny
2021	The Great Indian Kitchen	Valiyachante Mon
2021	Kaatinarike	Jailer
2021	Aaha	Antony German
2022	Freedom Fight	Minister Thomas
2022	Viral Sebi	Rameshan Nair
2022	Saudi Vellakka	Adv. Shenoy
2023	Enthada Saji	Vicar
2023	Thaal	
2024	Vivekanandan Viralanu	Dr. Mahalingeshwaran

=== Television ===
- Best Actor (Amrita TV)
- Apradhana Varthakal (Amrita TV)
- Marimayam (Mazhavil Manorama)

=== Web series ===
Year	Title	Role	Notes
2024	Jai Mahendran	Sathish	

=== Books ===
- Nirangalude Jathakakatha (Collection of Poems) 2005
- 101 Chodyangal (Screenplay) 2015
- Kure Gunithangalum Haranangalum (Collection of Poems) 2015
- Onnam Number Platform (Collection of Short Stories) 2021
