= Grihalakshmi (magazine) =

Indian magazine

- Cover of 1–15 March 2018 issue
- Categories: Women's magazine
- Frequency: Biweekly
- Founded: 1979
- Company: Mathrubhumi Group
- Country: India
- Based in: Kozhikode
- Language: Malayalam
- Website: mathrubhumi.com

Grihalakshmi is an Indian magazine published fortnightly by the Mathrubhumi group. As of December 2013, it is the fifth largest regional language magazine in India by circulation according to IRS Survey 2013, with average qualifying sales of 826,000 copies.

== History and profile ==
A women's magazine published in Malayalam, Grihalakshmi was launched in 1979 as a monthly publication. It became a bi-weekly in 2013. Grihalakshmi is owned and published by Mathrubhumi, and is based in Kozhikode.

== Women’s Midnight Half-Marathon ==
On 30 January 2016, Grihalakshmi organized a Women’s Midnight Half-marathon in Kochi, Kerala. It was the first of its kind in India. Prominent Malayalam actor Mamta Mohandas, Olympic athlete Anju Bobby George and social worker Sunitha Krishnan were the ambassadors of the event.

Organized as a celebration of womanhood, the agenda was to spread the message that the streets are safe and free for women also in the night. Around 2000 people attended the marathon. The then Home Minister Ramesh Chennithala launched the event. The marathon started at 10:30 pm on 30 January and crossed over to 31 January, making it a two-day marathon.

== See also ==
- Mathrubhumi
