= Vyloppilli Sreedhara Menon =

Indian writer

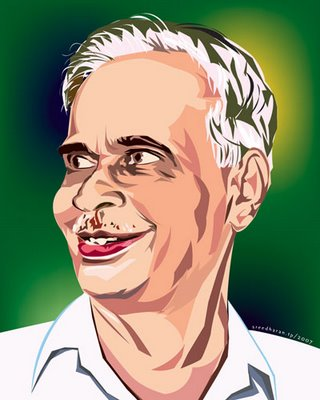
- Born: 11 May 1911; Kaloor, Cochin
- Died: 22 December 1985 (aged 74)
- Occupation: poet writer
- Spouse: Bhanumathi Amma
- Relatives: Thripunithara Kochukuttan Kartha (Father) Nanikuttiyamma (Mother) Bhanumathiyamma (Wife)
- Writing career
- Pen name: Vyloppilli
- Language: Malayalam
- Genre: Poetry
- Notable works: Kudiyozhikkal; Kannikkoythu; Mambazham; Makarakoythu; Kaipavallari; Vida
- Notable awards: 1964 Kerala Sahitya Akademi Award; 1971 Odakkuzhal Award; 1971 Sahitya Akademi Award; 1981 Vayalar Award

Vyloppilli Sreedhara Menon (11 May 1911 – 22 December 1985) (also written as Vailoppilli) was an Indian poet of Malayalam literature. Known for his works such as Kudiyozhikkal, Kannikkoythu and Mambazham, Menon was the founder president of the Purogamana Kala Sahitya Sangham, an organisation of Kerala-based artists, writers and art and literature enthusiasts. He received several honours including Sahitya Akademi Award, Kerala Sahitya Akademi Award for Poetry, Vayalar Award and Odakkuzhal Award.

== Life and career ==
Vyloppilli Sreedhara Menon was born on 11 May 1911, in Kaloor in Ernakulam to Cheranellore Kochukuttan Kartha and Nanikutty Amma. Starting his early education with a local Asan (teacher), Menon did his formal education initially at the Government Primary School, Kaloor and later at St. Albert's High School, Ernakulam from where he completed the high school education in 1927. Subsequently, he graduated in Science from Maharaja's College, Ernakulam. He continued his education to pass BT degree from Saidapet Training College, Madras and started his career as a teacher in government service in 1931 at Kandassamkadavu Government High School. His teaching career took him to 20 different schools in Kerala until his retirement from service in 1966 as the head master of Ollur High School, the present day Vailoppilli Sreedhara Menon Memorial Government Vocational Higher Secondary School. He was involved with literary organisations such as Kerala Sahitya Akademi and Sahithya Pravarthaka Co-operative Society; he was a member of the organising committee of the former and the board of directors of the latter. He also served as the editor of the official magazine of the Kerala Sasthra Sahithya Parishad. When Purogamana Kala Sahitya Sangham, a forum of progressive writers led by leftist intellectuals and artists, was formed in 1981, he was selected as its founder president and he held the position until 1985. He represented Kerala thrice at the national poets' meetings of 1951 (Delhi), 1959 (Delhi) and 1965 (Bangalore) and toured the Soviet Union in 1970.

Menon married Bhanumathi Amma, a school teacher, in 1955. They had two sons, Sreekumar, an ayurvedic physician and Vijayakumar, a homoeopathic doctor. However, the couple had differences between themselves and were staying separately when he died on 22 December 1985, succumbing to brain haemorrhage. Bhanumathi Amma died on 26 June 2018.

== Legacy ==
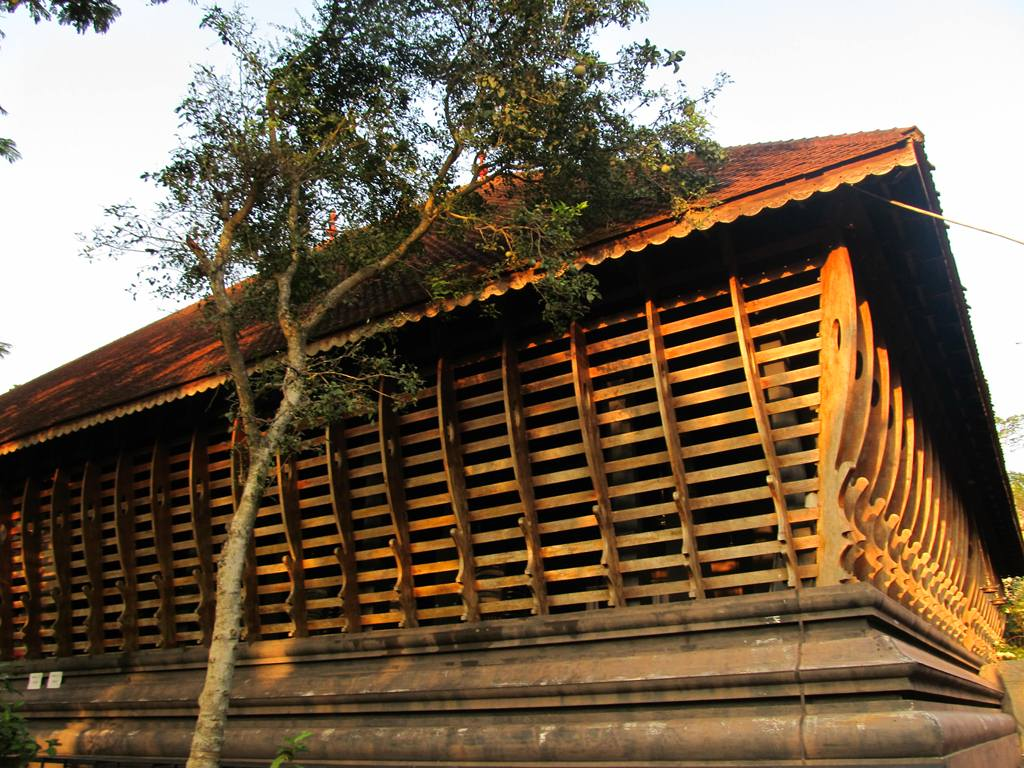
Vyloppilli Samskrithi Bhavan

Menon started writing under the pen name Sree and his first poetry anthology, Kannikkoythu (The Maiden Harvest) was published in 1947; Kuttikrishna Marar opined that the poems signify a strong sprouting of Malayalam poetry that deviated from the romantic tradition prevalent during those times. He is considered by literary historians as one of the major voices in Malayalam poetry who marked the transition from the Romantic to the modern era. A scientific insight into the historical roots of social evolution and a deeper understanding of the psychological undercurrents of the human mind characterise his poetry. His mastery of the medium is evident in all his poems both lyrical and narrative.

Menon published around 20 books, composed of poems, plays and biographies. Many critics consider the long poem Kudiyozhikkal (Eviction of the tenant) as his magnum opus. M. Leelavathy wrote that the poem is a ruthless self-examination of a middle class land owner who realises that the future belongs not to himself but to his poor tenant whom he despises at heart. The poem has been translated into English by P. K. N. Panicker and is included in the book, Selected Poems of Valoppilli Sreedhara Menon.ISBN 978-93-5207-076-3 Vida, Kannikkoythu, Makarakoythu and Kaipavallari are among his other major works, all of which have won awards. Kanneerpadam, a poem he wrote soon after his separation from his wife, is reported to be autobiographical. Sahyante Makan, a Malayalam film released in 1982, is based on a poem of the same name written by Menon. One of his poems titled, Madathakkili, was used as a song in the movie, Vajrram. Krishnashtami: the book of dry leaves, based on the poem 'Krishnashtami' by Vyloppilli Sreedhara Menon which appeared in the 1958 collection 'Kadalkkakkakal', directed by Abhilash Babu is a 2025 Malayalam still image film.

== Awards and honours ==
Vyloppilli Sreedhara Menon received the Soviet Land Nehru Award in 1964, the same year as the Kerala Sahitya Akademi awarded him their annual award for poetry for his anthology, Kaipavallari. He received the Odakkuzhal Award in 1971 for Vida and the anthology was awarded the Kendra Sahithya Academy Award, the same year. His work, Makarakoythu, was selected for the Vayalar Award in 1981. He was also a recipient of the Madras State Government Award, Kalyani Krishna Menon Prize and M. P. Paul Prize. An annual literary award, Vyloppilli Poetry Award, has been instituted in his honour. The Department of Cultural Affairs of the Government of Kerala have built a multi-purpose cultural complex housing an open air auditorium, art gallery and museum block in Nanthancode, Thiruvananthapuram and the complex has been named Vailoppilly Samskrithi Bhavan in honour of the poet. The museum block also holds the personal belongings of Menon. Another institution that holds Menon's name is Government Vocational Higher Secondary School, Ollur, the institution where he served as the head master at the time of his retirement which is known as Vailoppilli Sreedhara Menon Memorial Government Vocational Higher Secondary School.

== Works ==
=== Poems ===
- Sreedhara Menon, Vailoppilli (2013). Vailoppilli: sampoorna krithikal. Thrissur: Current books. ISBN 9788122611335. Archived from the original on 30 January 2019.
- Vyloppilli Sreedhara Menon (1952). Kudiyozhikkal (in Malayalam). Current Books. ISBN 9788122611168.
- Vyloppilli Sreedhara Menon. Vyloppilliyude Balakavithakal. Mambazham. ISBN 9788126422654.
- Vyloppilli Sreedhara Menon (2017). Aprakasitha Rachanakal. DC Books. ISBN 9789386560582.
- Vyloppilli Sreedhara Menon (January 2007). Anthi Chayunnu. Current Books. ISBN 9788122606010.
- Vyloppilli Sreedhara Menon (January 2007). Makarakoythu. Current Books. ISBN 9788122606737.
- Vyloppilli Sreedhara Menon. Kaipavallari. Current Books. ISBN 9788122606027.
- Vyloppilli Sreedhara Menon (2007). Kanneerpadavum Mattu Pradhaana Kavithakalum. DC Books. ISBN 9788126416332.
- Sreedhara Menon, Vailoppilli (2006). Kannikoythu (in Malayalam). Thrissur: Current Books. ISBN 9788122605471.
- Sreedhara Menon, Vailoppilli. Vitthum kaikkottum: kavithakal. Kottayam: National Books.
- Sreedhara Menon, Vailoppilli (1991). Charithrathile charu drishyam (2nd ed.). Thrissur: Vailoppilly smaraka samithi.
- Vyloppilli Sreedhara Menon. Vida (in Malayalam). DC Books.
- Vyloppilli Sreedhara Menon. (in Malayalam). Current Books. ISBN 9788122609837.
- Vyloppilli Sreedhara Menon. (in Malayalam). Current Books. ISBN 8122605117.
- Sreerekha
- Onappatukar
- Kuruvikal
- Minnaminni
- Pachakkuthira
- Mukulamala
- Krishnamrigangal
- Mambazham
- Yugaparivarthanam

=== Plays ===
- Risyasringanum Alexandarum (Play)

=== Short stories ===
- Himavante Puthrikal

=== Autobiography ===
- Sreedhara Menon, Vailoppilli (1988). Kavyaloka Smaranakal.

== Books and articles on Vyloppilli ==
- Jayasree, V R (2013). "Imagery in the poetry of Vyloppilli Sreedhara Menon". INFLIBNET. Mahatma Gandhi University. hdl:10603/7568.
- M. K. Sanu (2011). Vyloppilli Vakkukalude Manthrasakthi. [Kottayam]: DC Books. ISBN 9788126432110. OCLC 789150681.
- K S Pillai, Chavara. G-Vyloppilli-Edasseri. Keerthi Books. Archived from the original on 29 January 2019.
- Panmana Ramachandran Nair, Current Books (2015). Vyloppilli Patanangal. P.K. Parameswaran Nair Memorial Trust. ISBN 9788124020388. Archived from the original on 29 January 2019.
