= Mambazham (poem) =

1936 poem by Vyloppilli Sreedhara Menon

"Mambazham" (മാമ്പഴം)( lit. Ripen Mango )is the most famous poem by Vyloppilli Sreedhara Menon. He penned it in 1936. The poem portrays a mother mourning her son and was a part of a collection published in 1936, in the Onam Edition of the Mathrubhumi newspaper. Menon states the main inspiration behind this poem is the memory of his brother, who died when he was four years old. In 1947, the poem was included in a compilation called Kanikoyithu. K G Marar and M N Vijayan reviewed the poem. The former praised it as a symbol of a renaissance in Malayalam poetry.

== Synopsis ==
The poem uses mango imagery to trigger the mother's reminiscences of the scolding she gave her son that drove him away. He then died. The mourning mother is consoled by her son in the form of a cool breeze.
