= Sthalam =

- Directed by: Kaviyoor Sivaprasad
- Written by: Sivaprasad
- Produced by: Mariam Anoop and Rajesh S. Nair
- Starring: Bala; Shweta Menon; Sudheesh; Jyothirmayi
- Release date: 26 October 2011 (Kannur)
- Country: India
- Language: Malayalam

Sthalam is a 2011 Malayalam film written and directed by Kaviyoor Sivaprasad, and produced by Mariam Anoop and Rajesh S Nair under the banner of Avagama creations. The film, starring Bala, Shweta Menon, Sudheesh, and Jyothirmayi, and shot in Tiruvalla, is based on the life of environmentalist Pokkudan. Second schedule for Sthalam started at Kannur in India by 26 October 2011. Jyothiramayi plays a deglam role in the film.

== Cast ==
- Bala
- Shweta Menon
- Sudheesh
- Jyothirmayi
- Risabawa
- Kundara Johny
- Kochu Preman
- Kallen Pokkudan
