= Maayunnu, Maarivarayunnu, Nisvaasangalil... =

Indian experimental mockumentary film

- Directed by: Abhilash Babu
- Screenplay by: Abhilash Babu
- Story by: Abhilash Babu
- Produced by: Crowd Funding
- Starring: Pradeep Kumar; Surya S Kenshin; Gauthami Kaur
- Cinematography: Jose Mohan; Biju Mohan; Don Palathara Abhijith Chithrakumar
- Edited by: Hari Geetha Sadasivan
- Production company: the week-end academia thiruvananthapuram
- Release date: 15 December 2024
- Running time: 134 minutes
- Country: India
- Language: Malayalam

Maayunnu, Maarivarayunnu, Nisvaasangalil... (Dust Art Redrawn in Respiration) is a 2024 crowd funded Indian Malayalam language experimental mockumentary film directed by Abhilash Babu. The film was premiered at the 29th IFFK.

== Summary ==
Suneer Muhammad and Naveen are father and son, similarly Nalini and Dhanya are mother and daughter. Dhanya and Naveen were in a romantic relationship and without knowing this Suneer and Nalini fall in love and decide to live their life together. This creates a dilemma in Dhanya's life and she breaks up with Naveen.

== Cast ==
- Pradeep Kumar - Suneer Muhammad
- Surya S - Nalini
- Kenshin - Naveen
- Gauthami Kaur - Dhanya
- Aromal T - Documentary Director
- Sherin Catherine - Stephy Susan
- Anil EP - Anil EP
- Abhilash Babu - Film Director

== Production ==
Director Abhilash Babu, who had already made a film Aalokam in 2023, decided to meet people with his script and many came forward to support him through crowdfunding. Thus 'Maayunnu, Maarivarayunnu, Nisvaasangalil...' was launched. The film follows the format of a documentary or an interview and the film did not have any music score. It was completed with a budget of two lakhs fifty thousand with a shooting time of 13 hours. Actor Kenshin stated that, "during workshop, we were linking the characters with our own experiences, as if we took a particular route in our life at a particular point of time."

== Accolades ==
- Official Selection, Malayalam Cinema Today at the 29th IFFK
- Official Selection, Malayalam Cinema Category at the 8th Dialogue International Film Festival, Ottappalam.
- Official Selection, KUFF (Kerala University Film Festival), 2025
- Official Selection, Indian Cinema Now category, IEFFK, Kozhikode, 2025
- Official Selection RIFFK, Kozhikode, 2025
- Official Selection TIFF, Thalassery, 2025
