= Jeo Baby =

Writer, director, Actor

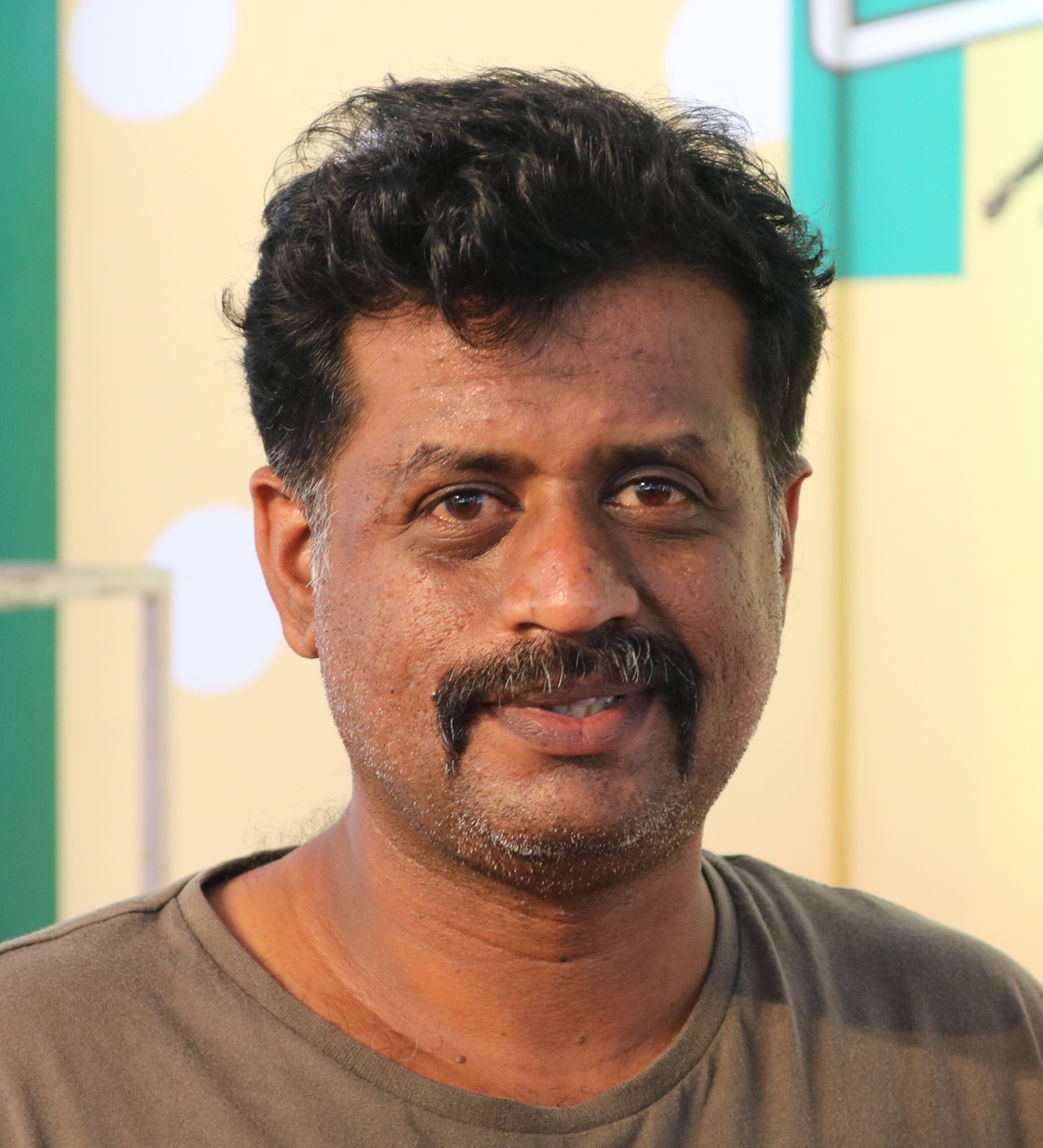
- Born: Thalanadu, Kottayam, Kerala, India
- Occupations: Film director; screenwriter; actor
- Years active: 2016–present

Jeo Baby is an Indian film director, screenwriter and actor who works in Malayalam films. His family drama film The Great Indian Kitchen (2021) won the 51st Kerala State Film Award for Best Film and he received the Kerala State Film Award for Best Screenplay.

== Early life ==
He studied cinema at St. Joseph College of Communication, Changanacherry. During his final year, he directed the 2007 short film Secret Minds which discussed same-sex relationships. He, along with three other students (the producer and actors), were suspended and later expelled from the college, which alleged the film had "obscene scenes which were capable of misleading young minds" and that they had not gotten permission to shoot it on campus. However, Jeo Baby later stated that the film "did well at international film festivals".

== Career ==
Jeo Baby started his career in the entertainment industry by writing for Television sitcoms in 2010. He was involved in scripting the initial episodes of popular television sitcoms Marimayam, 'Uppum Mulakum' and 'M80 Moosa'.

He made his directional movie debut through the Malayalam movie '2 Penkuttikal' which was released in 2016. His second movie Kunju Daivam was released in 2017. In 2020 he directed Kilometers and Kilometers which has Tovino Thomas playing the lead role. The movie didn't get a theatrical release due to COVID-19 pandemic & premiered directly on Malayalam satellite channel Asianet followed by an OTT release on Netflix.

His fourth Malayalam film, The Great Indian Kitchen, which has Suraj Venjaramoodu & Nimisha Sajayan playing the lead roles, was directly released on 'NeeStream' OTT platform on 15 January 2021. The movie was later officially released on Amazon Prime. The film was successful, with a Tamil remake being released in 2023 and a 2024 Hindi remake Mrs. (film).

Jeo Baby stated that it had given him the confidence to take more risks for his own 2023 film Kaathal – The Core. Starring Mammootty (who also financed the film and decided to collaborate with Jeo Baby after watching The Great Indian Kitchen) and Jyothika in the lead roles, the film has been praised as a serious and sensitive drama about a panchayat candidate navigating societal reactions and his relationships after his wife outs him as gay to end their loveless marriage.

== Short film ==
Year	Title	Role	Notes
2007	Secret Minds	Screenwriter	1.Screened in Queer LGBT Film Festivals, Bangalore: 2. Screened in International Queer Film Festival, Rice University, Houston

== Television ==
=== Sitcoms ===
Year	Title	Role	Channel
2011	Marimayam	Screenwriter	Mazhavil Manorama
2014	M80 Moosa	Screenwriter	Media One
2015	Uppum Mulakum	Screenwriter	Flowers TV

== Filmography ==
=== As director and screenwriter ===
Year	Title	Credited as			Role	Notes
Year	Title	Director	Writer	Actor	Role	Notes
2016	2 Penkuttikal	Yes	Yes	No	—N/a	
2017	Kunju Daivam	Yes	Yes	Yes		
2020	Kilometers and Kilometers	Yes	Yes	Yes		
2021	The Great Indian Kitchen	Yes	Yes	No	—N/a	
2022	Freedom Fight	Yes	Yes	Yes		Anthology film; segment: Old Age Home
2022	Sreedhanya Catering Service	Yes	Yes	Yes	Siby	
2023	Kaathal – The Core	Yes	No	Yes	Kuttayi's stepfather	

=== As actor ===
This is a list of films that he only worked as an actor.

Year	Title	Role	Notes
2015	Ain		
2019	Edakkad Battalion 06	Villager	
2021	Varthamanam	Advocate	
2021	Kho-Kho	Meenakshi's father	
2022	Chera		
2023	Purusha Pretham		
2023	Kolla	S.I. Victor Sebastian	
2023	Pulimada	Agustine	
2024	Mandakini	Sagar	
2024	Swakaryam Sambhava Bahulam	Raveendran	
2024	Jai Mahendran	Harichandran	SonyLIV web series
2025	Maranamass	Jessy's father	
2025	Kerala Crime Files 2	Aashraya Incharge	JioHotstar web series
2025	Meesha		
2025	Kammattam	Samuel Oommen	ZEE5 web series
2025	Ithiri Neram	Sanal	
2025	Krishnashtami: The Book of Dry Leaves		Based on Vyloppilli's poem 'Krishnashtami'
2026	Athiradi	SI Manichan	

As presenter

- Kaadhal Enbadhu Podhu Udamai (2025; Tamil)
