= Ain (film) =

- Directed by: Sidhartha Siva
- Written by: Sidhartha Siva
- Produced by: Sidhartha Siva
- Starring: Musthafa; Rachana Narayanankutty
- Cinematography: Prabhath
- Edited by: Vineeb Krishnan
- Music by: Rahul Raj
- Production company: 1:1.3 Entertainments
- Release date: 25 September 2015 (Kerala)
- Country: India
- Language: Malayalam

Ain is a 2015 Indian Malayalam-language film written and directed by Sidhartha Siva and starring Musthafa and Rachana Narayanankutty. Set in a Muslim household in Malabar, the film revolves around a lazy but innocent and vulnerable youth who happens to witness a murder and escapes to Mangalore. The film released in selected theatres in Kerala on 25 September 2015.

The film won the National Film Award for Best Feature Film in Malayalam, while Musthafa got a Special Jury Mention for acting. The film also won the Padmarajan Award. The original musical score was composed, arranged, programmed and produced by Rahul Raj & the song penned by Vishal Johnson.

== Plot ==
Maanu is a naïve, lazy and aimless youngster who doesn't have a steady job with a steady income. Although time has come for him to shoulder the responsibility of providing for his family, he runs away from it and is least concerned about what life means to him. Maanu flees his native place to Mangalore in fear of his life, after witnessing the gruesome murder of a local politician. The interaction he has with Saira following a chance meeting with her influences him to change his outlook towards life.

== Cast ==
- Musthafa as Maanu
- Rachana Narayanankutty as Saira Banu
- Sudheesh
- Sudhakaran Nair as Saira's father

== Release ==
Ain released in theatres in Kerala on 25 September 2015. The film was scheduled to be screened in theatres across the state but released finally in 3 theatres in Trivandrum, Thrissur and Calicut. The film industry came out together against this move by theatres including appeals by actors such as Kunchako Boban and Vineeth Sreenivasan appealing directly to audience to watch Ain.

== Awards ==
2014 Kerala State Film Awards

- Best Story - Sidhartha Siva

62nd National Film Awards-2015

- National Film Award for Best Feature Film in Malayalam Language
- National Film Award - Special Jury Mention for acting- Musthafa
