= 2 Penkuttikal =

- Theatrical release poster
- Directed by: Jeo Baby
- Written by: Jeo Baby
- Produced by: Nasib BR; Jayachandran Kolencherry; Joji Joseph
- Starring: Anna Fathima; Shambavi
- Cinematography: Adwaith Shine
- Edited by: Rahman Muhammed Ali
- Music by: Mathews Pulickan
- Production companies: Cinema Cooks; Eiffel Entertainments
- Distributed by: Eros International
- Release date: 22 January 2016
- Country: India
- Language: Malayalam

2 Penkuttikal (English: Two Girls) is a 2016 Indian Malayalam film directed by Jeo Baby (in his directorial debut). It stars Anna Fathima and Shambavi in the lead roles with cameo appearances from Amala Paul, Tovino Thomas, and Anju Kurian. Fathima won Kerala State Film Award for Best Child Artist for her role in the film. 2 Penkuttikal was screened at the Odisha International Film Festival and Busan Kids and Youth International Film Festival.

== Plot ==
The film discusses issues faced by young girls and women in today's society. Achu and Anagha are close friends, who decide to bunk their class to visit a mall in the city. Their visit to the city changes their life and what happens next forms the crux of the film.

== Cast ==
- Anna Fathima as Younger Achu
- Amala Paul as Older Achu
- Shyambhavi Suresh as Younger Anagha
- Anju Kurian as Older Anagha
- Tovino Thomas as Sanju, Anagha's boyfriend
- Priya Shine as Achu's Mother
- Kiran Aravindakshan as Malayalam Teacher
- Chinchu Mohan as Anagha's Mother
- Shine Thankam Raj as Achu's Father
- Suresh as Principal
- Ardra as Sindhu
- Safvan as Anagha's Father
- Shiju Kuruvila as Police Inspector
- Anand Thiruvannoor as Police Constable

== Music ==
2 Penkuttikal

Soundtrack album by Mathews Pulickan
- Released: 22 January 2016
- Recorded: 2015
- Genre: Feature film soundtrack

Mathews Pulickan chronology
2 Penkuttikal (2016)	'Kunju Daivam' (2017)

The music of the film was composed by Mathews Pulickan. Lyrics was written by Jobi Moozhiyankan Joseph and Gilu Joseph and the songs are sung by Mrithul, Haritha Balakrishnan and Leah Anne Philip.

Original Tracklist
No.	Title	Length
1.	"Aakasha Neelima"	5:57
2.	"Here We Go"	2:05

== Release ==
The film was released on 22 January 2016 in theaters across Kerala.

== Critical reception ==
Litty Simon, a critic of Onmanorama, gave 3 rating out of 5 and stated that "A narrative with a social message, 2 Penkuttikal is not a mere female-centric movie, but one that upholds humanity."
