= The Great Indian Kitchen =

2021 film directed by Jeo Baby

- Promotional poster
- Directed by: Jeo Baby
- Written by: Jeo Baby
- Produced by: Dijo Augustine; Jomon Jacob; Vishnu Rajan; Sajin S Raj
- Starring: Nimisha Sajayan; Suraj Venjaramoodu
- Cinematography: Salu K. Thomas
- Edited by: Francies Louis
- Music by: Sooraj S. Kurup; Mathews Pulickan
- Production companies: Mankind Cinemas; Symmetry Cinemas; Cinema Cooks
- Distributed by: Neestream; Amazon Prime Video
- Release date: 15 January 2021
- Running time: 100 minutes
- Country: India
- Language: Malayalam

The Great Indian Kitchen is a 2021 Indian Malayalam-language drama film written and directed by Jeo Baby. The film tells the story of a newly-wed woman (Nimisha Sajayan) who struggles to be the submissive wife that her husband (Suraj Venjaramood) and his family expect her to be. The music was composed by Sooraj S. Kurup and Mathews Pulickan.

The film was released on Neestream on 15 January 2021. The film received critical acclaim and won Kerala State Film Award for Best Film, Best Screenplay award for Baby and Best Sound Designer award for Tony Babu.

The film was remade in Tamil in 2023 under the same title, with Aishwarya Rajesh and Rahul Ravindran in the lead roles. A Hindi remake, Mrs. with Sanya Malhotra and Nishant Dahiya in lead roles, was released in 2025.

== Plot ==
An educated dancer, raised in Manama, Bahrain finds herself in an arranged marriage to a teacher in a very traditional and patriarchal Indian family. The drudgery of the kitchen and its many unpleasantries—cleaning, filthy utensils and leaking taps—are left to the women while the men mostly indulge themselves with their phones or yoga. The men eat their meals first and leave the place a mess; their convenience and comfort always come before consideration for their wives.

While the new bride takes a while to adjust to the new surroundings and eventually makes a degree of peace with them, her mother-in-law goes away to take care of her daughter, who is seven months pregnant. The whole responsibility of cooking, cleaning and other household chores falls to her. Her egotistical husband is inconsiderate of her needs and feelings. When she tells him that having sex hurts her and asks for some foreplay, he remarks that she seems to know much about sex and condescendingly tells her that he needs to be attracted to her for foreplay, making her cry herself to sleep.

Her father-in-law forbids her from seeking employment, citing that a woman in the house brings prosperity to the family. When she gets her period, she is appalled to discover that the family's beliefs regarding menstruation are extremely regressive. She is asked to hole herself up all alone on the floor in a room, bathe in the river, eat separately and wash all the things she touches. She is even asked to go stay with a relative or to sleep outside during those days.

While these events transpire, Kerala is grappling with the Sabarimala temple verdict, where the courts decided that menstruation is not an impurity and so women should be allowed to visit the temple. Many people, including her husband's family, do not approve of the verdict.

All these injustices boil over one day and end up with the wife throwing murky kitchen sink water on her husband and father-in-law and leaving the family for her freedom and dignity. The film ends with a scene showing her as an independent dance teacher arriving in her own car while her ex-husband is married again and the second wife seems to meet the first one's fate.

== Cast ==
- Nimisha Sajayan as the Wife, a dancer
- Suraj Venjaramoodu as the Husband, a teacher
- T. Suresh Babu as Achan
- Ajitha V.M. as Amma
- Ramadevi as Ammayi (Ramadevi)
- Kabani as Usha, the servant
- Sidhartha Siva as Husband's cousin
- Anupama V.P. as Wife's mother
- M.V. Suresh Babu as Wife's father
- Nishitha Kallingal as Husband's cousin's wife
- Gireesh Perincheeri as Guruswami
- Aparna Sivakami as Activist
- Suresh Achoos as News reader
- Anagha Ashok
- Priya Sreejith

== Production ==
The shooting of the film started on 11 July 2020, in Calicut. The entire movie was shot within a house except for some outdoor scenes. The film's principal cast includes several theatre artistes from Calicut.

== Music ==
Sooraj S. Kurup composed the film's songs. The lyrics were written by Mrudula Devi S and Dhanya Suresh. Two songs from this movie are in paluva language which is a mysterious language in paraya community

Track listing
No.	Title	Lyrics	Artist(s)	Length
1.	"Oru Kudam"	Mrudula Devi S	Haritha Balakrishnan, Sulekha Kapadan	02:10
2.	"Neeye Bhoovin"	Dhanya Suresh Menon	Renuka Arun	03:21
Total length:				05:31

== Release ==
The film was directly released on Neestream, a Malayalam streaming platform on 15 January 2021. Several mainstream OTT platforms including Amazon Prime Video and Netflix as well as major television channels rejected the film due to some scenes related to the Sabarimala woman entry issue. Although, Amazon Prime Video got the rights of the film after three months of its release on Neestream. The satellite rights were later purchased by Asianet due to the film's positive response.

== Reception ==
=== Critical response ===
Upon release, it received positive reactions from various film critics and was well received by the audience. On the review aggregator website Rotten Tomatoes, 100% of 8 critics' reviews are positive, with an average rating of 8/10.

Litty Simon of Malayala Manorama wrote, "The excellent direction, well-written characters and seasoned performances with insightful message makes The Great Indian Kitchen a fulfilling experience." Anjana George of The Times of India praised, "The Great Indian Kitchen comes as an eye-opener, at a time many women are still judged for their cooking skills than any other capabilities. It not only talks about the new-gen women who question such unsung slavery but is also a tribute to the women who have been silently managing it inside every home for centuries." Soumya Rajendran of The News Minute has effused, "The Great Indian Kitchen rips through patriarchy, the bedrock of the institutions of family and religion."

S. R. Praveen of The Hindu said that 'Actors Nimisha Sajayan and Suraj Venjaramoodu are excellent in this hard-hitting take on the sheer drudgery of everyday life, that many women go through. Sajin Shrijith of The New Indian Express wrote: "This film made me want to talk to every woman in my family and ask them how they handled their frustrations and why some of them never dared to question their men?." Haricharan Pudipeddi of Hindustan Times wrote: The Great Indian Kitchen has to be the most powerful film on patriarchy in recent years and it makes for a very important watch. Its lead actor Nimisha Sajayan is unbelievably convincing. Sify has rated The Great Indian Kitchen as 4 stars out of 5 and has written the film as an excellent family drama. Bobby Sing from The Free Press Journal rated the film four in a scale of five and described it as an "unusually exceptional film that makes you feel the guilt." Baradwaj Rangan of Film Companion South wrote "The Great Indian Kitchen is a powerful tale of emancipation".

== Accolades ==
51st Kerala State Film Awards

- Kerala State Film Award for Best Film
- Kerala State Film Award for Best Screenplay - Jeo Baby
- Best Sound Designer - Tony Babu

44th Kerala Film Critics Association Awards

- Kerala Film Critics Association Award for Best Film

67th Filmfare Awards South

- Filmfare Award for Best Actress - Malayalam - Nimisha Sajayan

10th South Indian International Movie Awards

- Critics Choice Award for Best Actor (Malayalam) - Nimisha Sajayan

== Adaptation ==
It was adapted to Tamil film by the same name, released in 2023, directed by R. Kannan.

It was adapted to Hindi film Mrs. with Sanya Malhotra and Nishant Dahiya in lead roles, was released in 2025.
