= Kunju Daivam =

2018 film by Jeo Baby

- Directed by: Jeo Baby
- Written by: Jeo Baby
- Story by: Jeo Baby
- Produced by: Nasib B.R; Sanu S. Nair
- Starring: Adish Praveen; Joju George; Reina Maria; Sidhartha Siva
- Cinematography: Joby James
- Edited by: Rahman Mohammed Ali
- Music by: Mathews Pulickan
- Production company: Ocean Pictures
- Release date: 16 February 2018
- Running time: 93 minutes
- Country: India
- Language: Malayalam

Kunju Daivam is an Indian Malayalam film written and directed Jeo Baby, starring Adish Praveen, Joju George, Reina Maria, Sidhartha Siva as lead characters. Kunju Daivam' was last in the news when its lead Adish Praveen won the National Film Award for Best Child Artist. The film was produced by Nasib B R and Sanu S Nair under the banner of Ocean Pictures. It's Jeo Baby' second project in Malayalam as a director after 2 Penkuttikal. An ode to the age of innocence, Kunju Daivam tells the story of a spirited boy and his little world full of miracles. Mathews Pulickan has composed the soundtrack and background score for the film. The film was released theatrically on 16 February 2018.

== Plot ==
A little boy who dreads of math homeworks, dreads exams and believes that God will save him from all his problems, Ouseppachan is the 'head' of his small family in the absence of his father, who works abroad. A God-fearing boy, who never misses a Mass, he regularly prays to God to make him taller, help him win the online game 'Criminal Case' and make his math teacher fall from his bike or wouldn't mind praying to God for somebody's death so that he doesn't have to attend school. Most of his prayers somehow happen, much to his joy. Once, he prays to God to let someone die so that he could bunk school, but it is his grandfather, to whom he is quite close, who passes away. Overpowered by grief and guilt thinking that it was his prayers that caused the death, Ouseppachan decides to redeem himself by saving someone from death - not only through prayers, but also by the virtue of his deeds. That's when a girl with double kidney failure, Katha Jeevan, comes into his life. He tries everything to receive funds for treatment even steal money from his mother's wallet. Finally he finds Shibu who acts as a kidney donor to Kadha. The movie stresses on the theme that divinity is innocence itself.

An ode to the age of innocence, Kunju Daivam tells the story of a spirited boy and his little world full of miracles.

== Cast ==
- Adish Praveen as Joseph / Ousepachan
- Joju George as Shibu
- Shyambhavi Suresh as Kadha Jeevan
- Reina Maria as Kadha's Mother
- Sidhartha Siva as Parish Priest
- Prasanth Philip Alexander as Jobychan
- Pauly Valsan as Shibu's Mother
- Soolapani as Grand Father / Varkey Mathew
- Sreeja Thalanadu as Ancy
- Sheeba Prasanth as Nun
- Sajeev Nair as Maths Teacher
- Noby Thalanadu as Jose
- Anna Jinu Vallanattu as Annakutty
- Blessan Liju Vallanattu as Joseph's Friend
- Cristy Sajan Vallanattu as Joseph's Friend

== Music ==
Kunju Daivam

Soundtrack album by Mathews Pulickan
- Released: 22 November 2017
- Recorded: 2016
- Genre: Feature film soundtrack
- Length: 3:12
- Label: Satyam Audios

Mathews Pulickan chronology
'2 Penkuttikal' (2016)	Kunju Daivam (2017)

The music of the film was composed by Mathews Pulickan. Lyrics were written by Linku Abraham, Vishal Johnson and Jeo Baby and the songs were sung by Sarah Rose Joseph, Sangeetha Sreekanth and Mathews Pulickan.

Original Tracklist
No.	Title	Lyrics	Singer(s)	Length
1.	"Melle Thooval"	Linku Abraham	Sarah Rose Joseph, Sangeetha Srikanth	03:12
2.	"Thirinalamay"	Jeo Baby
3.	"Kanavukal"	Vishal Johnson
4.	"Akashame"	Jeo Baby
Total length:				03:12

== Awards ==
The film is competing at the 51st World Film Festival, Houston, and has been nominated for this year's Remi Award. It was also selected for the 20th International Children's Film Festival of India and the Busan Kids and Youth Film Festival, South Korea. The movie had made Adish Praveen, the main character to win the best child actor national award for the year
