= New generation (Malayalam film movement) =

Malayalam film movement

New generation films is a phrase commonly used to describe a Malayalam film wave which developed in the early 2010s, characterized by fresh and unusual themes and new narrative techniques. Films of the new wave differ from conventional themes of the past two decades and introduced several new trends and techniques to the Malayalam film industry. While the new generation formats and styles are deeply influenced by global trends, their thematics are firmly rooted in Malayalee life and mindscapes.

The new generation also helped to revive the Malayalam film industry in the early 2020s when the industry was hit with the effects of COVID-19 pandemic.

== Beginning ==
Filmmaker Amal Neerad is widely credited with bringing a new era of filmmaking in Malayalam cinema. His directorial debut, Big B (2007), introduced a fresh cinematic experience to Malayalam audiences and has since garnered a significant cult following. This style inspired upcoming filmmakers, who went on to experiment further and produce films in the coming years such as Traffic (2011), City of God (2011), Salt N' Pepper (2011) and Chaappa Kurishu (2011), which helped define the movement. In the beginning, most of the new wave films were modestly budgeted, thus supporting experiments by new directors between ₹2-3 crores, compared to the average Malayalam films that had a budget of ₹6-8 crores and have more than recovered their investment.

Unlike the general trend in the Malayalam films, most of the new directors were young. Director Aashiq Abu, one of the most talked-about new generation film-makers in Malayalam, introduced several new wave films and technicians. Actor-producer Jayasurya who had debuted into the industry in 2002, had begun creating his own signature in the new-wave of cinema through acting performances in films such as Beautiful and Trivandrum Lodge. Jayasurya had also broke the image barrier of performing in lead roles for a mainstream actor or star, by essaying several character roles and antagonist roles all which were critically acclaimed. Actor-writer Anoop Menon was another emerging personality in the beginning of New Generation Era.

== Characteristics of films ==
Erosion of the so-called "superstar" system in popular Malayalam films coincided with the rise of the new wave, where the screenplay got rooted in reality, closer to life, and lead characters became ordinary men and women. Influx of new actors, the absence of superstars, the rise of metro-centric/urban and middle-class themes and different story-lines were also noted in the wave. While formats and styles of the new directors are deeply influenced by the global trends, their thematics were firmly rooted in Malayali life and mind-scape. A recurrent trope in these new narratives is accidents, coincidences, casual encounters and chance meetings that set in motion an unexpected chain of events affecting the lives of the characters drifting in the urban flotsam. The frequent use of Malayalam influenced by English is also noted in the films. The use of the latest technology has added speed to the process of change in the industry. More advanced technology and innovative techniques are being experimented with, and the industry has become more open to trying out new ideas.

Until the beginning of the new wave, most Malayalam films had rural themes portraying the "essential goodness" and "unspoilt beauty" of villages. The focus of the films also shifted from the conventional masculine, handsome, virtuous and invincible hero to more humane characters. Another notable feature is that stories shifted to depict more non-male characters as leads. Films featuring gender minorities and homosexual leads (Kaathal – The Core, for example) are another definitive characteristic of this era of Malayalam cinema. The depiction of women has also changed in the new wave films beyond recognition. The leading ladies have often been shown to be working individualistic women by flirting openly, drinking and smoking in public, and making lewd comments, something which was considered taboo in the 80s and 90s. Several female-oriented films like 22 Female Kottayam (2012), How Old Are You? (2014), Rani Padmini (2015), Uyare (2019), The Great Indian Kitchen (2021), and Lokah Chapter 1: Chandra (2025) were also the part of the new wave.

=== Impact on superstardom ===
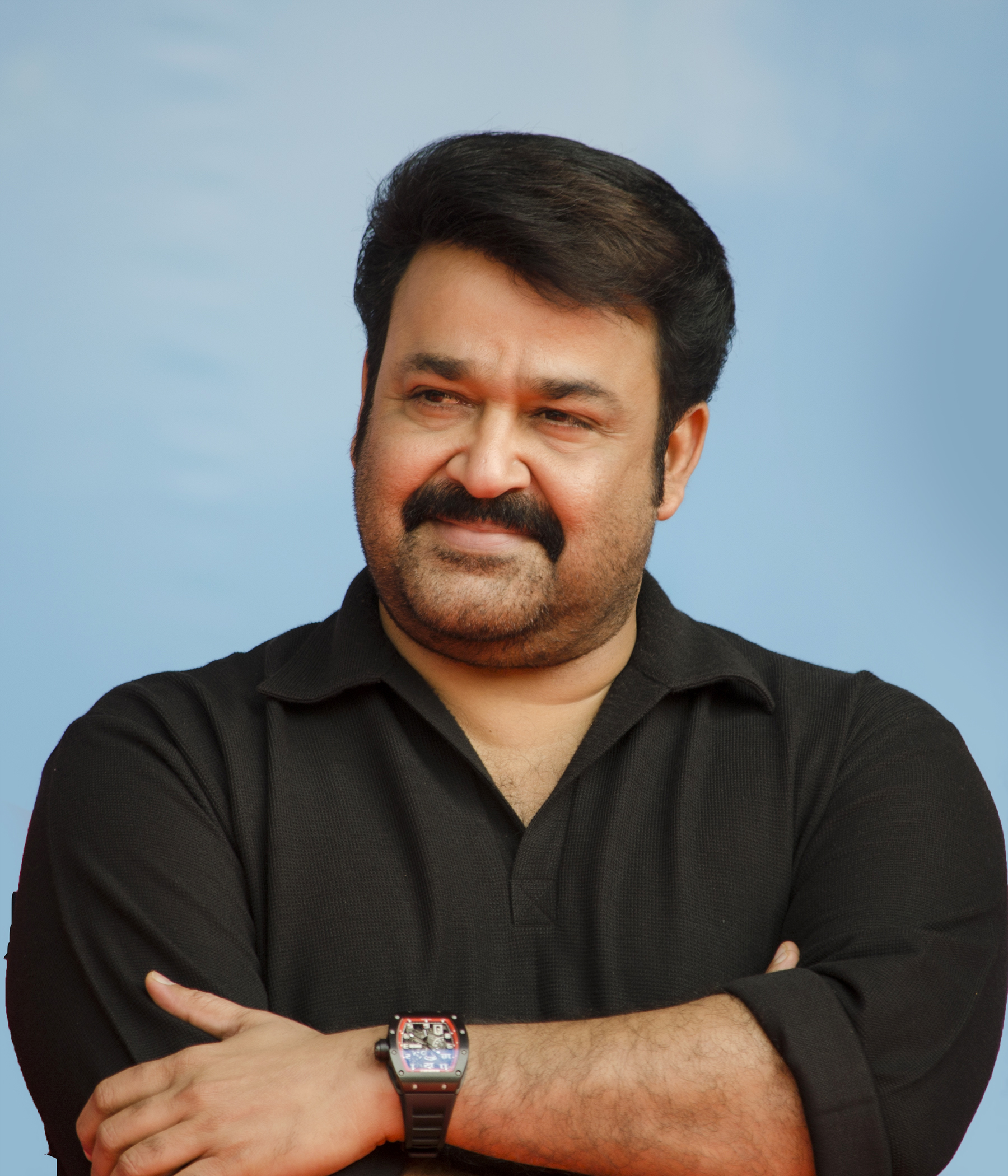
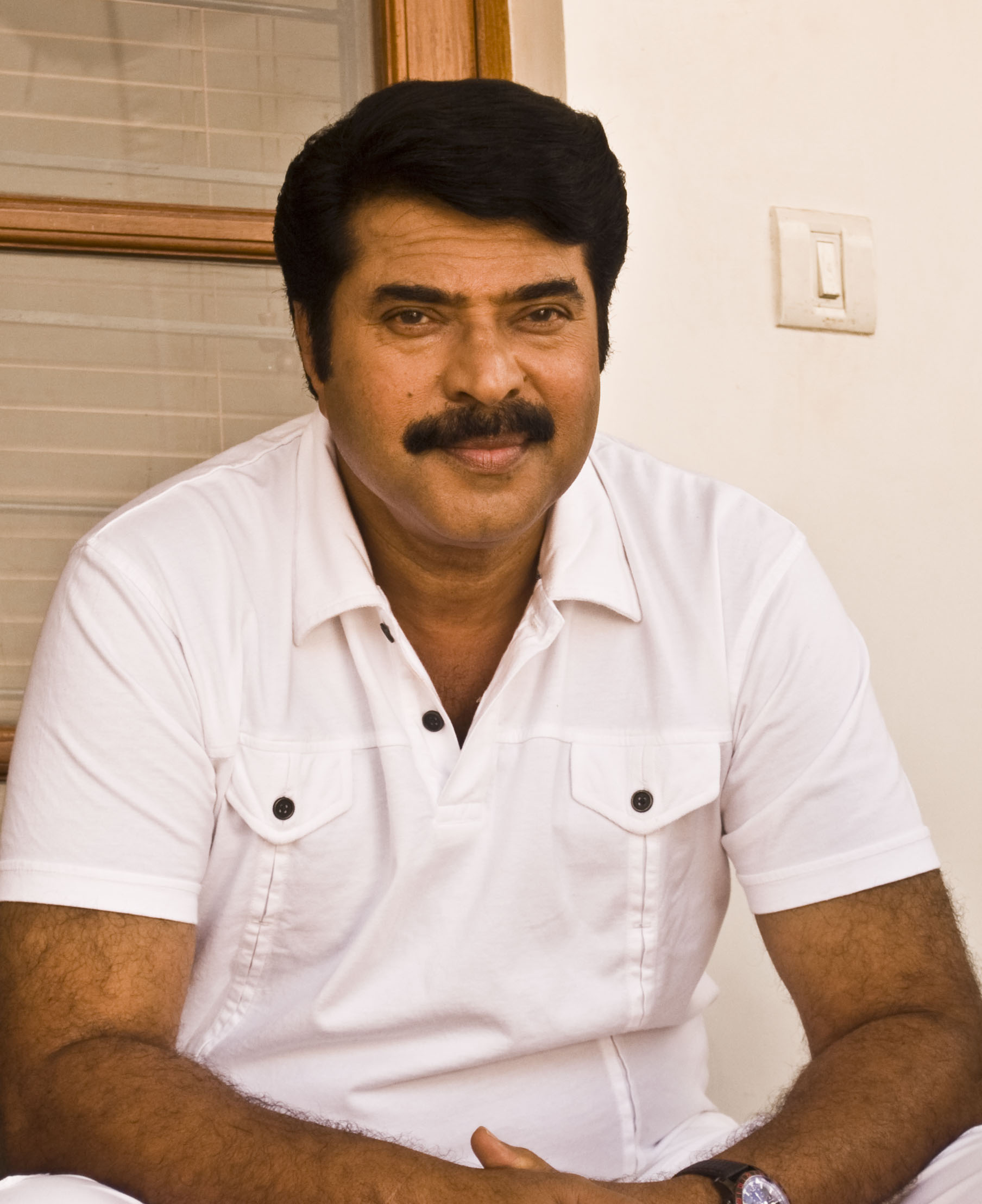
A new macho hero image emerged through many Malayalam films during the 1990s and 2000s, which added another dimension to the ascent of Mohanlal (Left) and Mammootty (Right) as superstars.

The new wave soon ignited a debate about the era of superstars coming to an end, with Malayalam cinema witnessing a radical change. In the 1980s, stars mattered, though not as much as in the 1990s and 2000s, when Malayalam cinema was practically dictated by the then superstars of the industry. The stranglehold of superstars that was stifling any new experimentation, complemented by the autocratic control of Malayalam film industry organisations over all areas of the industry, was seen as pushing the industry to the wall. Unlike Mohanlal, Mammootty has done more films with directors of new wave movement, mostly being the directors' debut movie.

== Notable personalities ==
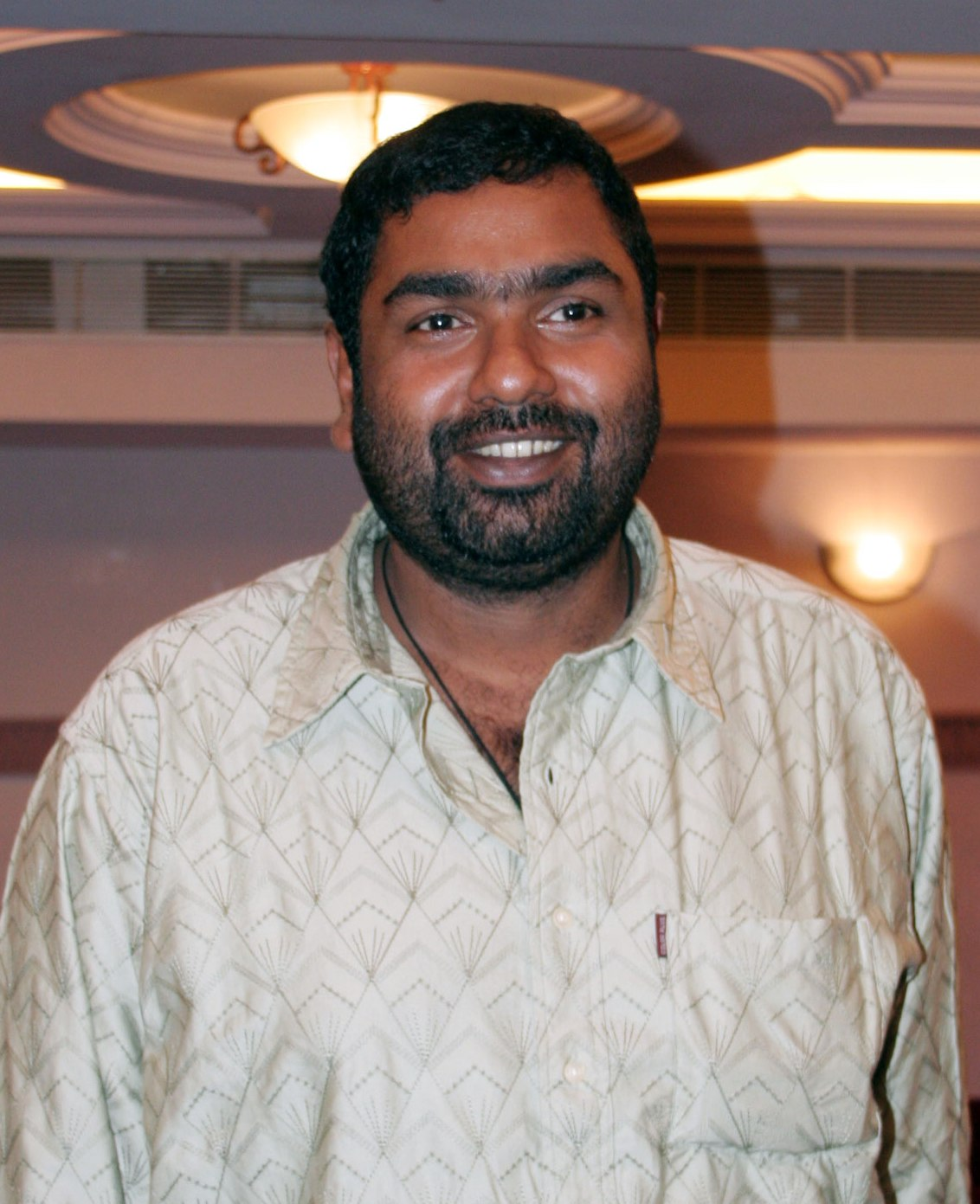
Amal Neerad

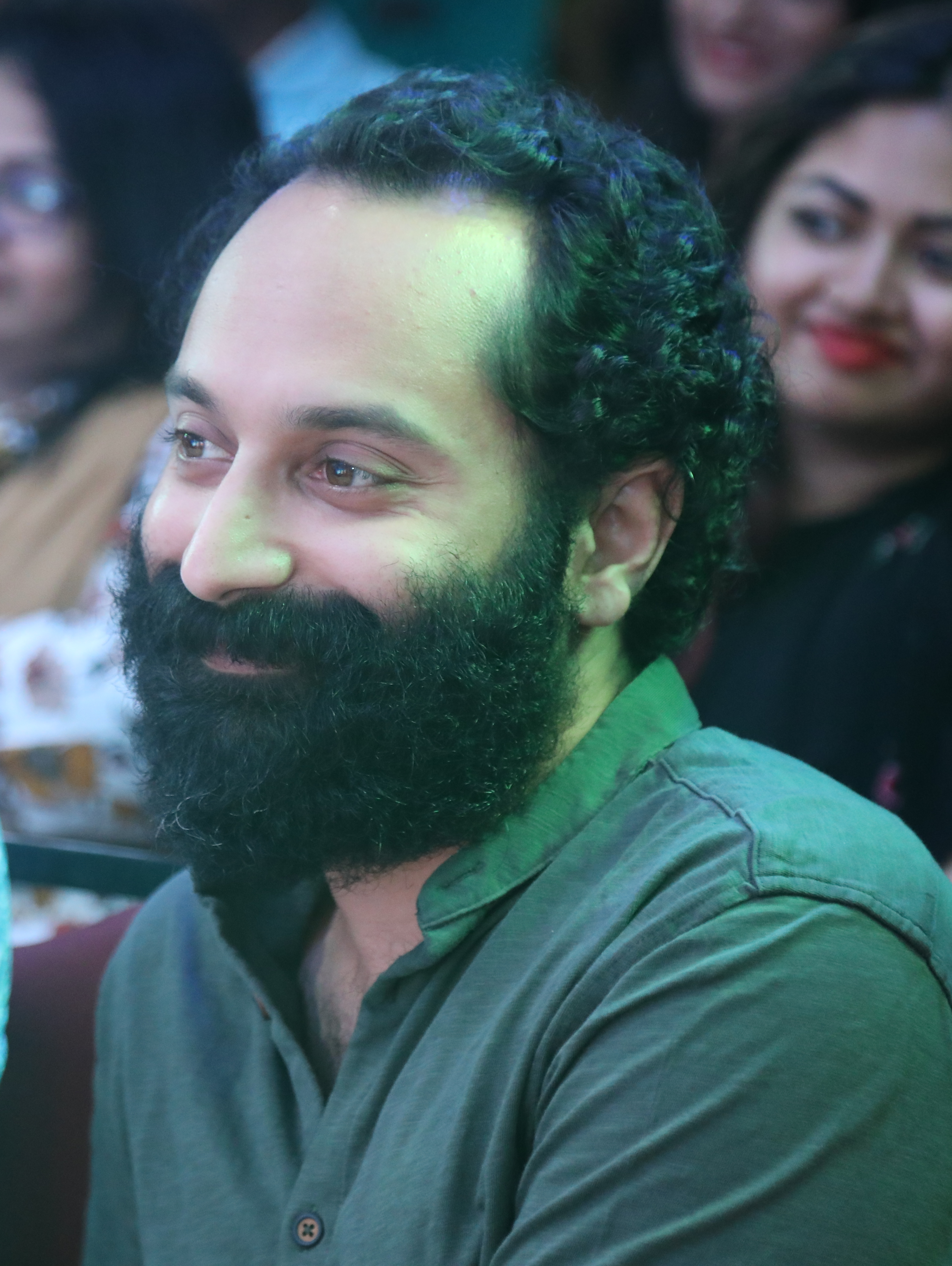
Fahadh Faasil

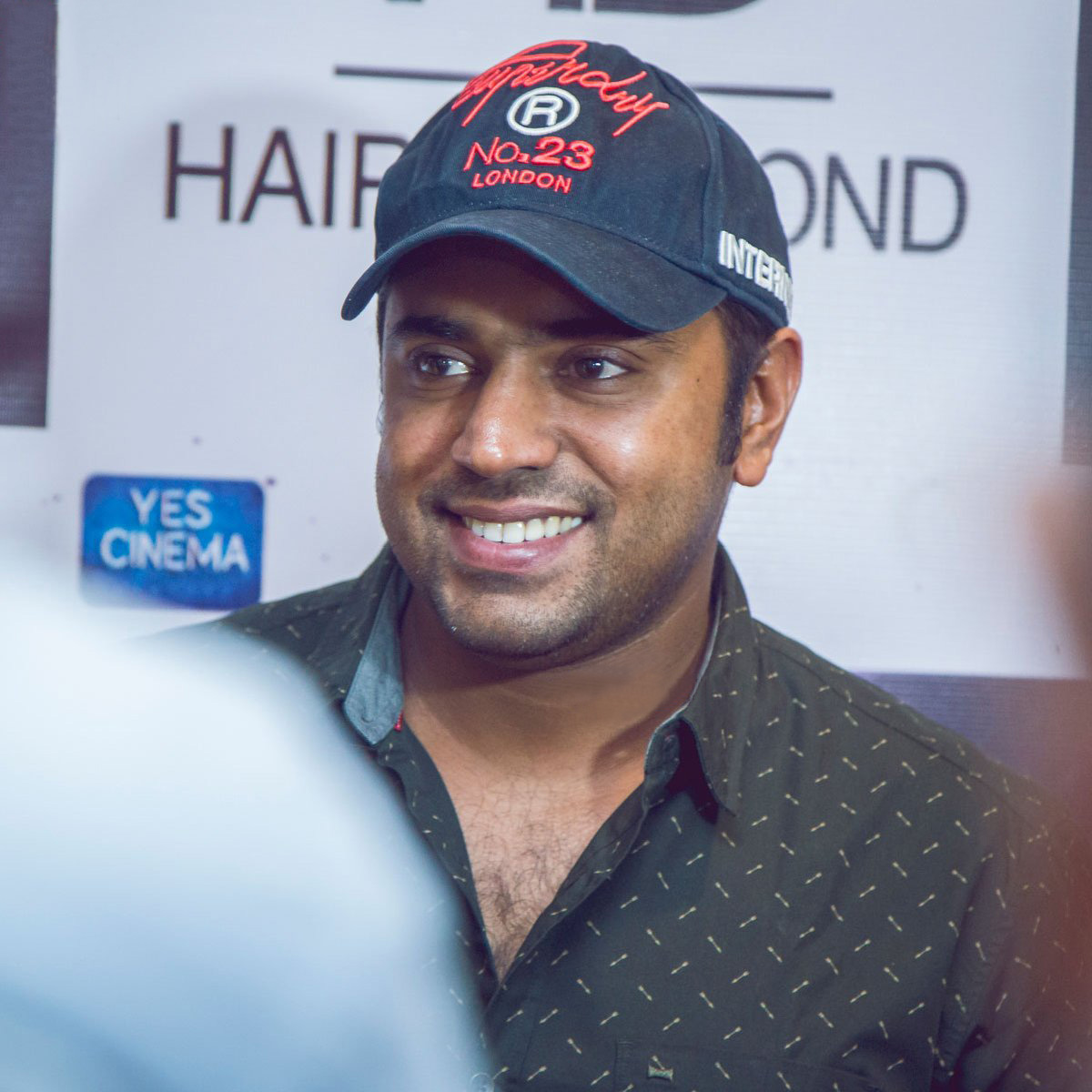
Nivin Pauly

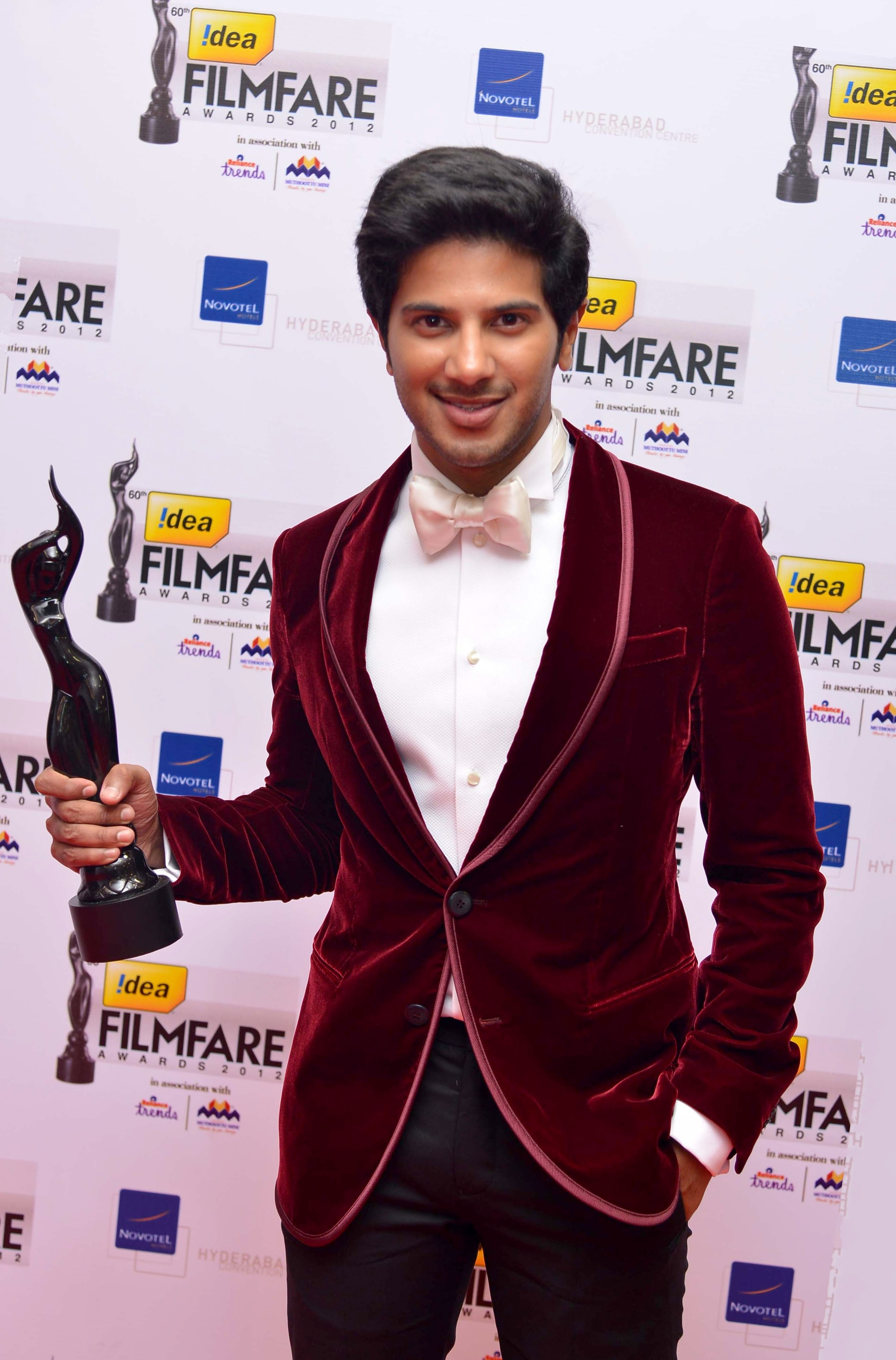
Dulquer Salmaan

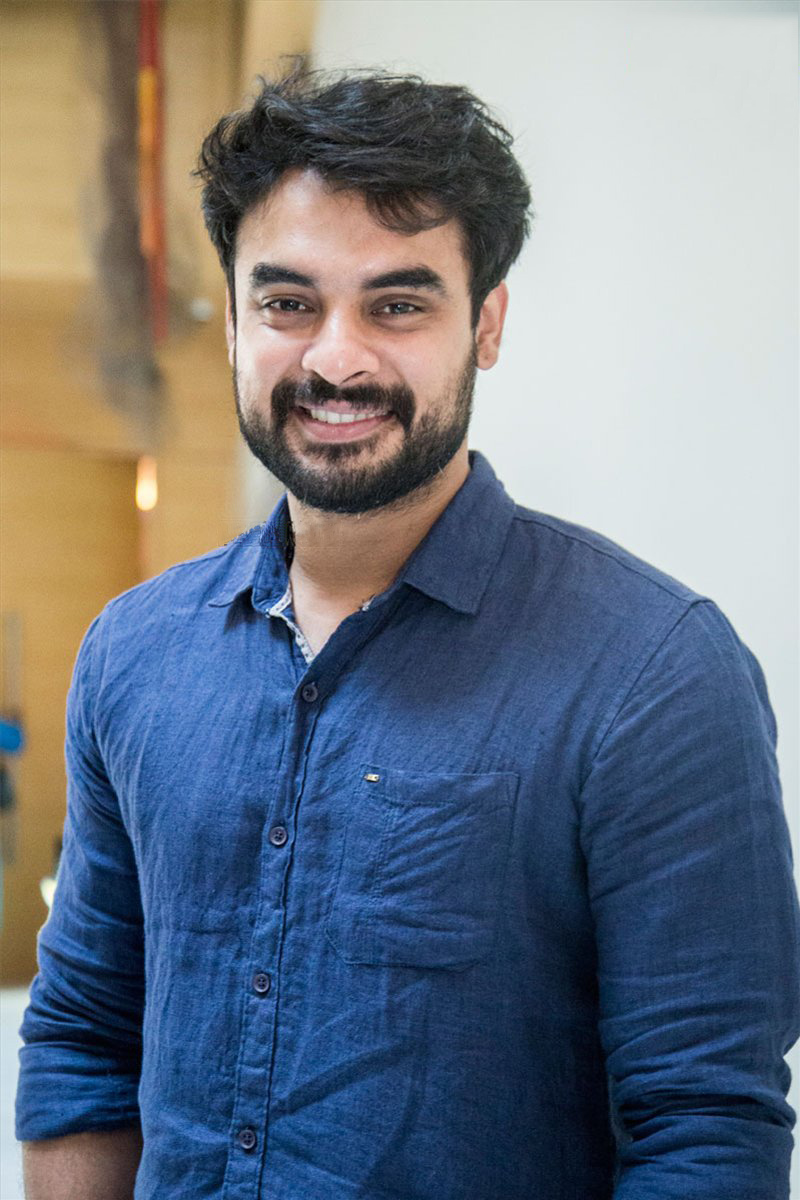
Tovino Thomas

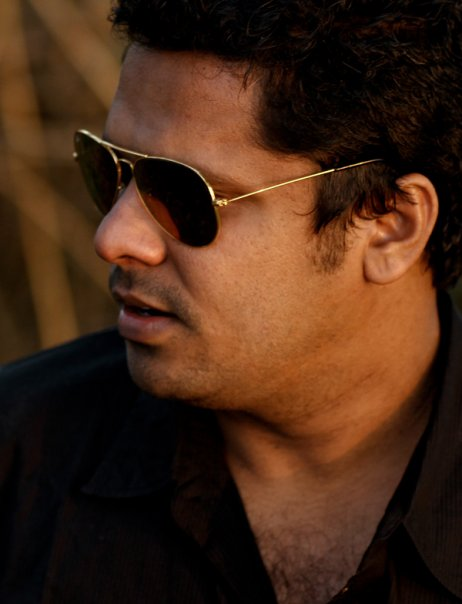
Aashiq Abu

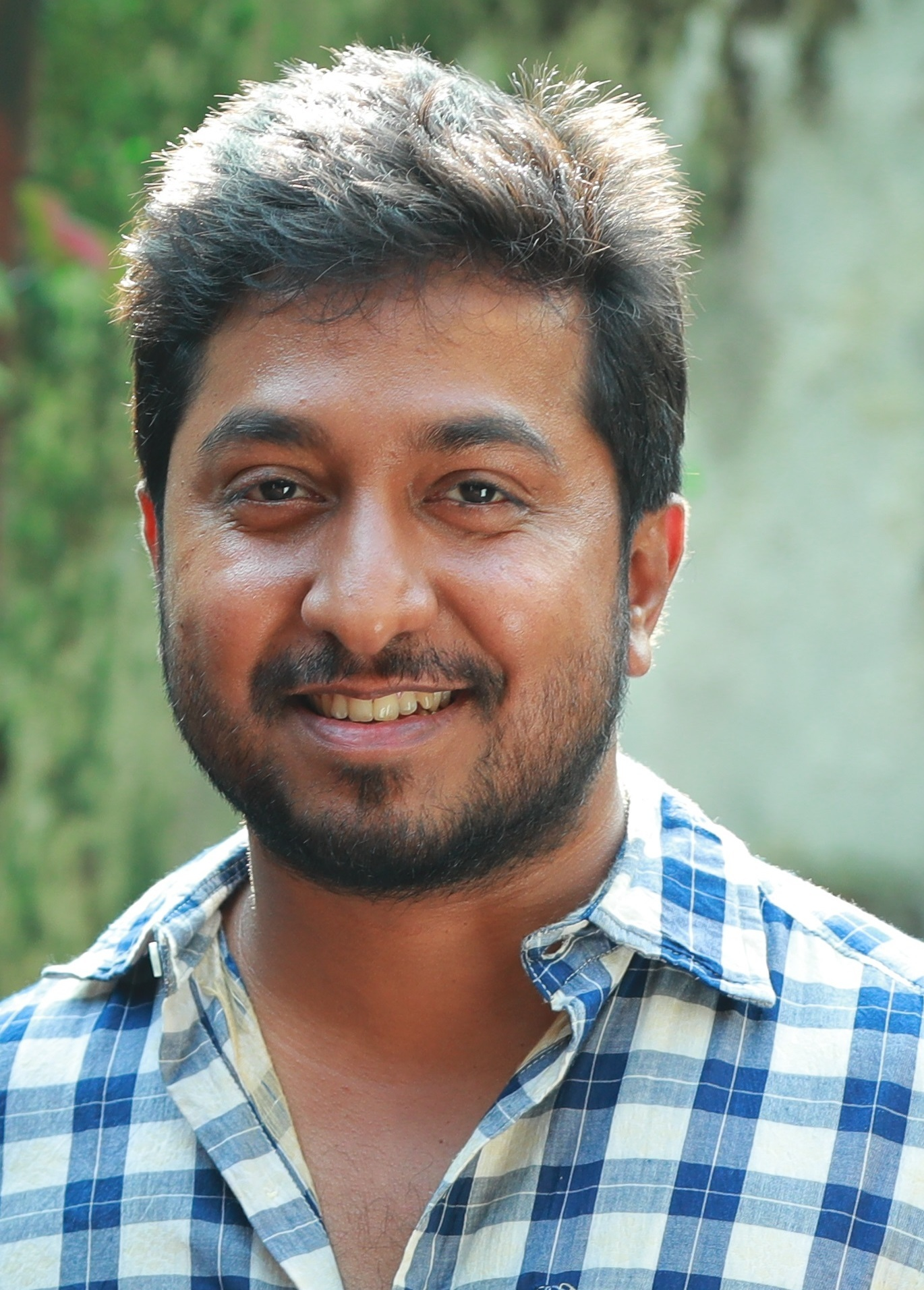
Vineeth Sreenivasan

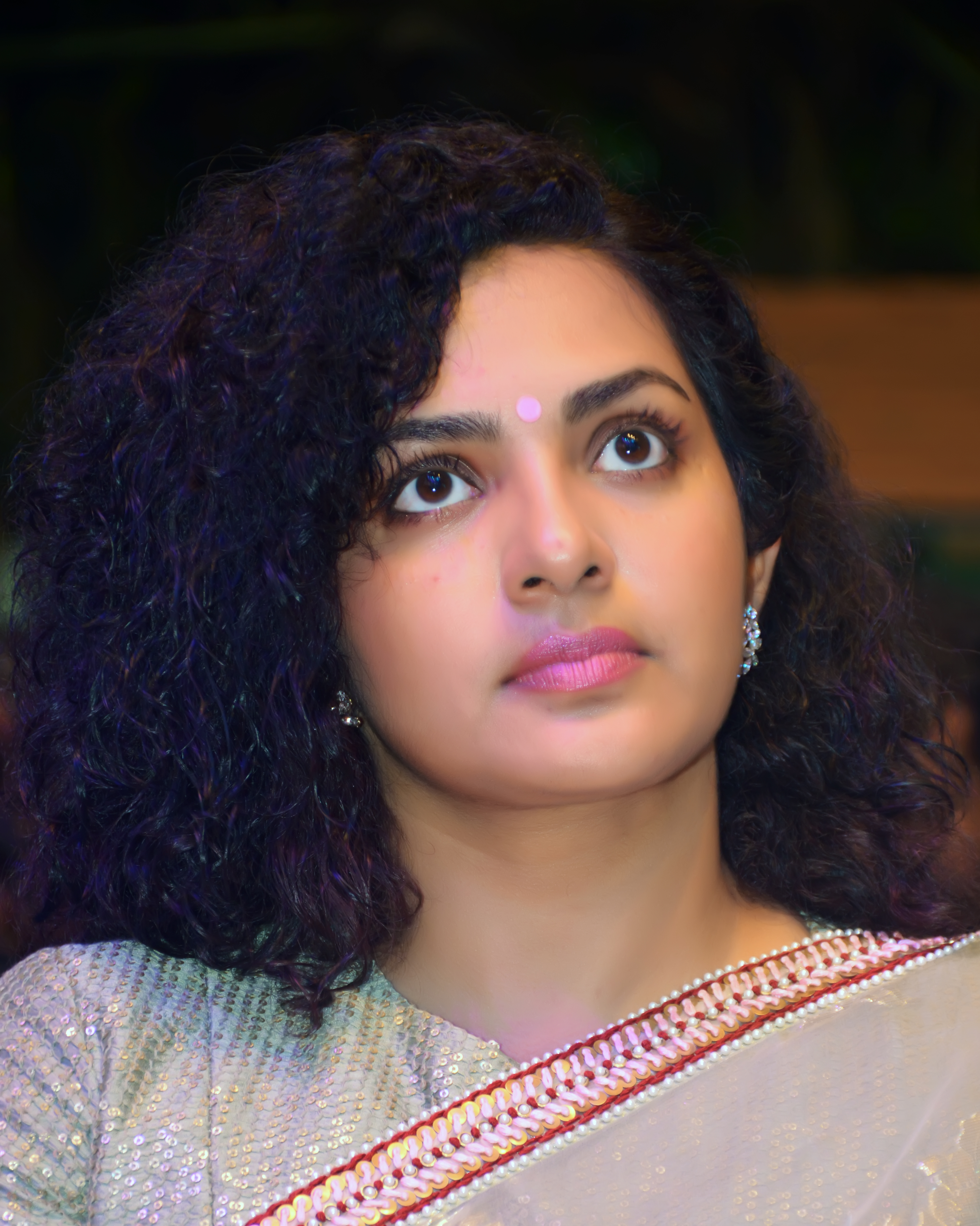
Parvathy Thiruvothu

=== Actors ===
- Aishwarya Lekshmi
- Aju Varghese
- Alencier Ley Lopez
- Amalda Liz
- Anaswara Rajan
- Anil Nedumangad
- Anna Ben
- Ann Augustine
- Anoop Menon
- Antony Varghese
- Anumol
- Anusree
- Aparna Balamurali
- Aparna Gopinath
- Arjun Ashokan
- Asha Sharath
- Asif Ali
- Balu Varghese
- Basil Joseph
- Binu Pappu
- Chemban Vinod Jose
- Darshana Rajendran
- Dhyan Sreenivasan
- Dileesh Pothan
- Dulquer Salmaan
- Fahadh Faasil
- Farhaan Faasil
- Grace Antony
- Honey Rose
- Jacob Gregory
- Jinu Joseph
- Johny Antony
- Joju George
- Kalabhavan Shajohn
- Kalidas Jayaram
- Kalyani Priyadarshan
- Madonna Sebastian
- Mamitha Baiju
- Manikandan R. Achari
- Manju Pillai
- Mathew Thomas
- Murali Gopy
- Muthumani
- Mythili
- Naslen K. Gafoor
- Nazriya Nazim
- Neeraj Madhav
- Nikhila Vimal
- Nimisha Sajayan
- Nithya Menen
- Nivin Pauly
- Nyla Usha
- Parvathy Thiruvothu
- Pranav Mohanlal
- Rajisha Vijayan
- Remya Nambeesan
- Renji Panicker
- Rima Kallingal
- Roshan Mathew
- Sai Pallavi
- Sajitha Madathil
- Sandeep Pradeep
- Sangeeth Prathap
- Samyuktha Menon
- Sasi Kalinga
- Shane Nigam
- Sharaf U Dheen
- Shine Tom Chacko
- Shwetha Menon
- Soubin Shahir
- Sreenath Bhasi
- Srindaa
- Sudev Nair
- Sunil Sukhada
- Sunny Wayne
- Swathi Reddy
- Tovino Thomas
- Unnimaya Prasad
- Unni Mukundan
- Vijay Babu
- Vinayakan
- Vinay Forrt
- Vineeth Sreenivasan

Actors like Mohanlal, Mammooty, Thilakan, Sukumari, KPAC Lalitha, Nedumudi Venu, Prithviraj Sukumaran, Jayasurya, Kunchacko Boban, Manju Warrier, Indrajith Sukumaran, Urvashi, Biju Menon, Sreenivasan, Siddique, Ashokan, Indrans, Pratap Pothen, Suraj Venjarammood, Harisree Asokan, Jagadish, Vijayaraghavan, Kalpana, Kunchan, Lal, Saiju Kurup, Jaffar Idukki, Baburaj, Lena, and Kottayam Nazeer, who began their career before the new wave, were also noted for their performances in the new generation films.

=== Directors ===
- Aashiq Abu
- Abrid Shine
- Alphonse Puthren
- Althaf Salim
- Amal Neerad
- Anjali Menon
- Anwar Rasheed
- Arun Kumar Aravind
- Ashraf Hamza
- Basil Joseph
- Chidambaram S. Poduval
- Dijo Jose Antony
- Dileesh Nair
- Dileesh Pothan
- Don Palathara
- Geetu Mohandas
- Girish A. D.
- Jeethu Joseph
- Jenuse Mohamed
- Jeo Baby
- Jithu Madhavan
- Johnpaul George
- Joy Mathew
- Khalid Rahman
- Lal Jr.
- Lijin Jose
- Lijo Jose Pellissery
- Madhu C. Narayanan
- Madhupal
- Mahesh Narayanan
- Manu Ashokan
- Martin Prakkat
- Midhun Manuel Thomas
- Muhammad Musthafa
- Muhsin Parari
- Rahul Sadasivan
- Rajeev Ravi
- Rajesh Pillai
- Ratheesh Balakrishnan Poduval
- Rohith V. S
- Rojin Thomas
- Roopesh Peethambaran
- Sameer Thahir
- Senna Hegde
- Sidharth Bharathan
- Shyju Khalid
- Soubin Shahir
- Tharun Moorthy
- Tinu Pappachan
- V. K. Prakash
- Venu
- Vinay Govind
- Vineeth Sreenivasan
- Zakariya Mohammed

Screenwriters like Syam Pushkaran, Dileesh Nair, Bobby–Sanjay, Unni R., Santhosh Echikkanam, Anjali Menon, PS Rafeeque, P. F. Mathews, S. Hareesh, Murali Gopy, Gopan Chidambaram, P. Balachandran, Shahi Kabir, Muhsin Parari; Cinematographers such as Shyju Khalid, Sameer Thahir, Madhu Neelakandan, Abinandhan Ramanujam, Jomon T. John, Renadive, Little Swayamp, Anend C. Chandran, Pappu, Shehnad Jalal, Vinod illampally; Musical Artists Bijibal, Rex Vijayan, Jakes Bejoy, Prashant Pillai, Sushin Shyam, Gopi Sundar, Rahul Raj, Shaan Rahman, Rajesh Murugesan, Shahabaz Aman, Vishnu Vijay, Justin Varghese; Editors like Vivek Harshan, B. Ajithkumar, Saiju Sreedharan, Mahesh Narayanan, Praveen Prabhakar, Manoj, Noufal Abdullah, Deepu Joseph etc. were also made significant contributions to New Wave films.

== Films widely regarded as new generation films ==
The following are some of the films widely considered as new generation Malayalam films:

- 100 Days of Love
- 1 by Two
- 1956, Central Travancore
- 1983
- 22 Female Kottayam
- 5 Sundarikal
- 7th Day
- Alappuzha Gymkhana
- Aanum Pennum
- Aarkkariyam
- Aavesham
- Action Hero Biju
- Ajagajantharam
- Akam
- Amen
- Anarkali
- Android Kunjappan Version 5.25
- Annayum Rasoolum
- Anugraheethan Antony
- Anuraga Karikkin Vellam
- Apothecary
- Ariyippu
- ARM
- Aattam
- Ayalum Njanum Thammil
- Ayyappanum Koshiyum
- Bachelor Party
- Bangalore Days
- Beautiful
- Bheemante Vazhi
- Bheeshma Parvam
- Bhoothakaalam
- Big B
- Bougainvillea
- Bramayugam
- C U Soon
- Chappa Kurishu
- Charlie
- Chirakodinja Kinavukal
- Churuli
- City of God
- Da Thadiya
- Dear Friend
- Double Barrel
- Drishyam (2013)
- Ee Adutha Kaalathu
- Ee.Ma.Yau.
- Ezra
- Family
- Falimy
- Friday
- Godha
- Guppy
- Halal Love Story
- Helen
- Honey Bee
- Hotel California
- How Old Are You?
- Hridayam
- Iblis
- Idukki Gold
- Iyobinte Pusthakam
- Jallikattu
- Jan.E.Man
- Jana Gana Mana
- Jo and Jo
- John Luther
- Joji
- Joseph
- Kala
- Kammatti Paadam
- Kanakam Kaamini Kalaham
- Kappela
- Kili Poyi
- Kumbalangi Nights
- Kunjiramayanam
- Kuttavum Shikshayum
- Lokah Chapter 1: Chandra (2025)
- Lukka Chuppi
- Mahaveeryar
- Maheshinte Prathikaaram
- Malaikottai Vaaliban
- Malayankunju
- Malik
- Manjummel Boys
- Mayanadi
- Mili
- Minnal Murali
- Moothon
- Mukundan Unni Associates
- Mumbai Police
- Munnariyippu
- Naaradan
- Nanpakal Nerathu Mayakkam
- Nayattu
- Nee Ko Njaa Cha
- Neelakasham Pachakadal Chuvanna Bhoomi
- Neram
- Neru
- Nidra
- Njan Steve Lopez
- Nna Thaan Case Kodu
- North 24 Kaatham
- Ohm Shanthi Oshaana
- Operation Java
- Oru Vadakkan Selfie
- Pada
- Palthu Janwar
- Parava
- Philips and the Monkey Pen
- Ponman
- Premalu
- Premam
- Puzhu
- Rani Padmini
- Rifle Club
- Romancham
- Salt N' Pepper
- Santhoshathinte Onnam Rahasyam
- Savam
- Second Show
- Sookshmadarshini
- Sudani From Nigeria
- Sulaikha Manzil
- Super Sharanya
- Swathanthryam Ardharathriyil
- Take Off
- Tamaar Padaar
- Thallumaala
- Thamaasha
- Thankam
- Thanneer Mathan Dinangal
- Thattathin Marayathu
- Thinkalazhcha Nishchayam
- The Great Indian Kitchen
- Theevram
- Thondimuthalum Driksakshiyum
- Trance
- Traffic
- Trivandrum Lodge
- Unda
- Ustad Hotel
- Ullozhukku
- Uyare
- Valiyaperunnal
- Varathan
- Vedivazhipadu
- Vettah
- Virus

== General response and criticisms ==
As per critics, the new wave of activity in Malayalam cinema is reminiscent of the 1980s, regarded as the golden age of Malayalam cinema, when mainstream films bridged the gap between arthouse (Parallel Cinema) and commercial movies, led by a team of talented writers and directors. In the 1980s, Malayalam films witnessed some positive changes through directors like K. G. George, Padmarajan and Bharathan, who made path-breaking films that led the "Middle Cinema" movement in Malayalam. These films too broke the norms which were considered the prerequisite for a commercial entertainer, and traversed a new path between popular and parallel cinema.

Rather unlike the earlier Parallel Cinema and Middle Cinema in Malayalam, where regionally rooted stories tended to be explored through universally translatable psychological, social and often political subtexts by using more original, auteur-like cinematic idioms, there is a general consensus that the New-Gen movies draw much inspiration from other film industries. They depict lives of people living in 21st century Kerala through a very realistic lens, it's often said that most of its success is due to the freshness these narratives possess in comparison to traditional Malayalam movies.. New-Gen Malayalam movies tend to feature more nuclear families and urban lifestyle, rather than the depiction of traditional joint families from villages. This and the adult themes present in many movies has gained the New-Gen movies the criticism that they're primarily targeted towards young people.

The new wave films are criticized for explicit language and provocative themes, often "under the guise of bold or modern". Malayalam actor Jayaram has talked about his disinterest towards the new generation films publicly, he has heard to be saying the new wave films lacks its appeal towards a family environment as the inappropriateness of mannerisms in certain films, beyond a PG-13 is very awkward to someone who expects to watch a family film such as most of the conventional Malayalam movies were, which did not need a specific rating.

The New generation received criticism from some conventional film-makers. In the beginning, they accused that plagiarized versions of foreign films are being presented under the guise of New Wave experiments. While admirers of the New Wave of Malayalam films call it the "Jasmine revolution", critics refer it as the "multiplex revolution". "Some films that are fresh in thought and execution have clicked at the box office," says veteran director Sibi Malayil. "But I am against referring to them as New Wave Cinema. Changes were always there in Malayalam films. But most of these so-called new-generation movies revolve around the themes that deal with life in a metro city. These films are getting a good response in tier-I cities only".
