= 46th Kerala State Film Awards =

Indian film awards

- Awarded for: Best of Malayalam Cinema in 2015
- Date: 1 March 2016
- Location: Thiruvananthapuram
- Country: India
- Presented by: Kerala State Chalachitra Academy
- First award: 1969

Highlights
- Most wins: Charlie (8)
- Website: http://www.keralafilm.com

The 46th Kerala State Film Awards were announced by minister Thiruvanchoor Radhakrishnan in Thiruvananthapuram on 1 March 2016. The winners in the fiction category were selected by a jury headed by veteran filmmaker Mohan. The other jury members were George Kithu, M. A. Venu, Sulakshana, Sharath, B. R. Prasad, Venugopal, Premchand, Dr Soman, and C.R. Rajamohan. The jury for the nonfiction category was headed by S. Jayachandran Nair and included Rajeev Gopalakrishnan, Pavitran, and C.R. Rajamohan. The J. C. Daniel Award was awarded to K. G. George. The awards were presented on 15 October 2016.

== Winners ==
Most Awards

Number of Awards	Film
8	Charlie
7	Ennu Ninte Moideen

Name of Award	Awardee(s)	Name of Film	Remarks
Best Film	Sanal Kumar Sasidharan (Director); Arun Mathew, Shaji Mathew (Producer)	Ozhivudivasathe Kali	
Second Best Film	Manoj Kana (Director); Priyeesh Kumar(Producer)	Amoeba	
Best Director	Martin Prakkat	Charlie	
Best Film with Popular Appeal and Aesthetic Value	R. S. Vimal (Director); Binoy Shankarath, Ragy Thomas, Suresh Raj (Producer)	Ennu Ninte Moideen	
Best Children's Film	Thomas Devasia	Malettam	
Best Actor	Dulquer Salmaan	Charlie	
Best Actress	Parvathy	Charlie, Ennu Ninte Moideen	
Best Child Artist	Gourav G Menon	Ben	
Best Child Artist	Janaki Menon	Maalgudi Days	
Best Debut Director	Sreebala K Menon	Love 24x7	
Best Cinematography	Jomon T. John	Charlie, Ennu Ninte Moideen, Nee-Na	
Best Story	Harikumar	Kaattum Mazhayum	
Best Screenplay (Original)	Unni R., Martin Prakkat	Charlie	
Best Screenplay (Adapted)	Razi Muhammed	Velutha Rathrikal	based on the short story 'White Nights' by Fyodor Dostoyevsky
Best Lyrics	Rafeeq Ahammed	Ennu Ninte Moideen	"Kaathirunnu Kaathirunnu"
Best Music Director	Ramesh Narayan	Edavappathy; Ennu Ninte Moideen	Pashyathi Dishi Dishi; Sharadambaram
Best Background Music	Bijibal	Pathemari, Nee-Na	
Best Male Singer	P. Jayachandran	Jilebi; Ennum Eppozhum; Ennu Ninte Moideen	Njnanoru Malayali; Malarvakakkombathe "Sharadambaram"
Best Female Singer	Madhushree Narayan	Edavappathy	"Pashyathi Dishi Dishi"
Best Dubbing Artist	Sarath	Edavappathy	
Best Dubbing Artist	Angel Shijoy	Haram	
Best Choreography	Sreejith	Jo and the Boy	
Best Costume Designer	Nisar Rahmath	Jo and the Boy	
Best Makeup Artist	Rajesh Nermara	Nirnnayakam	
Best Processing Lab/Colourist	Prasad Lab Mumbai	Charlie	
Best Film Editor	Manoj	Ivide	
Best Sound Recordist	Sandeep Kurissery, Jijimon Joseph	Ozhivu Divasathe Kali	Location Sound/Live Sound
Best Sound Recordist	Renganaath Ravee	Ennu Ninte Moideen	Sound Design
Best Sound Recordist	MR Rajakrishan	Charlie	Sound Mixing
Best Art Director	Jayashree Laxmi Narayanan	Charlie	
Special Jury Award	Jayasurya	Lukka Chuppi, Su.. Su... Sudhi Vathmeekam	Acting
Special Mention	Joy Mathew	Mohavalayam	Acting
Special Mention	Joju George	Oru Second Class Yathra, Lukka Chuppi	Acting
Special Mention	Shreya Jayadeep	Amar Akbar Anthony	Singer (Enno Njanente Muttathu)
Best Book on Cinema	K. B. Venu	K. G. Georginte Chalachithra yathragal	
Best Article on Cinema	Aju K Narayanan	Silver Screenile Ethirnottangal	
J. C. Daniel Award	K. G. George	—N/a	Lifetime achievement award
