= Kazhcha Chalachithra Vedi =

Film collective in Kerala, India

- Genre: Film Society
- Location: Thiruvananthapuram
- Country: India
- Years active: 2001–present
- Founded: 2001
- Website: kazhcha.in

Kazhcha Chalachithra Vedi or Kazhcha Film Forum is a film collective in Kerala, India. It started in the year 2001 at Neyyattinkara thaluk in Thiruvananthapuram district as a collective effort of film lovers. It has produced three short films. In the year 2013 the film society has been registered under the Travancore-Cochin Literary, Scientific and Charitable Societies Registration Act, 1955.

== About ==
Kazhcha Chalachithra Vedi has produced its first movie "Wonder World" with crowd funding. "Wonderworld" was scripted and directed by Sanal Kumar Sasidharan, Camera was handled by Sunny Joseph and the film was edited by Beena Paul. It was exhibited in the competition section of International Video film Festival (IVFest 2003). In the year 2008 Kazhcha Chalachithra Vedi has produced another short movie "Parole".

In 2012 It has produced its third short movie Frog, which has participated in many international Short film festivals and awarded best telefilm in the Kerala state television awards 2012 instituted by Kerala State Chalachitra Academy. It has also received award for best background music and a special jury mention for acting.

Kazhcha Chalachithra Vedi has produced it first feature film Oraalppokkam with crowd sourcing in 2014. Noted Indo-English Poet and activist Meena Kandasamy and noted Producer-Actor Prakash Bare, Bangali film director Bikrajit Gupta were playing the lead role.

Short films

Kazhcha produced three short films Athisayalokam in 2001, Parole in 2008 and Frog in 2012. All of them were directed by Sanal Kumar Sasidharan. Athisaya Lokam was a crowd funded attempt inspired from the great film activist and visionary director John Abraham. The short film was produced by the small contributions collected from the people of Perumkadavila, Marayamuttom, Keezharoor and other parts of Thiruvananthapuram district.

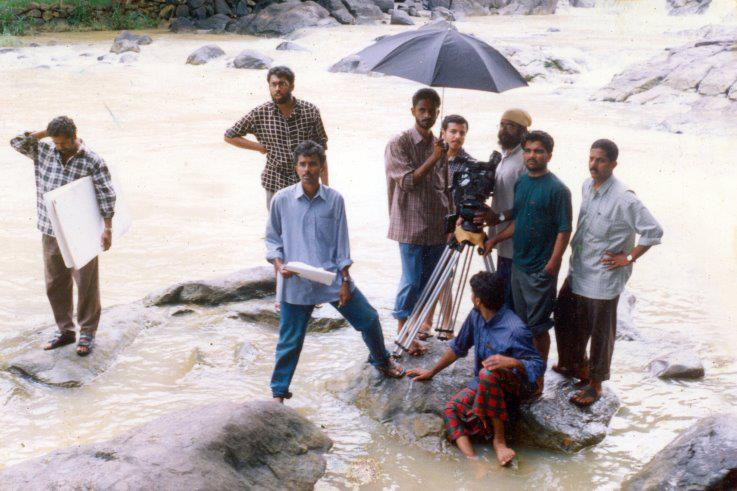
Shooting stills from Athisayalokam

== Feature films ==
In 2013 Kazhcha started its first full-length feature film, Oraalppokkam through crowd funding. More than 100 people contributed to this production and this film was again directed by Sanal Kumar Sasidharan. Prakash Bare and Meena Kandasamy acted in the lead roles and the film won International Federation of Film Critics (FIPRESCI) and Network for the Promotion of Asian Cinema (NETPAC) awards in the International Film Festival of Kerala. It also won Kerala State Film Awards Best Director for Sanal Kumar Sasidharan, Best Location Sound Recording for Sandeep Kurissery and Jiji P Joseph.

In 2016 Kazhcha has produced its second feature film, Eli Eli Lama Sabachthani? again through crowd funding. The film is produced in Marathi language. The film was directed by Jiju Antony. The film has been screened in major international film festivals in India.

In 2018 Kazhcha has announced its third feature film project by an entire women crew.

== Cinemavandi ==
In the year 2015, Kazhcha Started Cinemavandi, for the parallel distribution of Oraalppokkam. Film maker Adoor Gopalakrishnan inaugurated the Cinema vandi movement. Cinema Vandi traveled through Kerala and screened the film in more than 100 locations. The Cinemavandi travelled across Kerala with projector, screen and sound equipment. Following the successful run of Cinema Vandi, Oraalppokkam was released in movie theaters across Kerala

In 2016 Cinema Vandi again traveled with Savam by Don Palathara and it could screen the film in more than 60 localities. In 2017 Cinema Vandi travelled with Ozhivudivasathe Kali, Oraalppokkam and Kari, which was the third attempt by Cinema Vandi

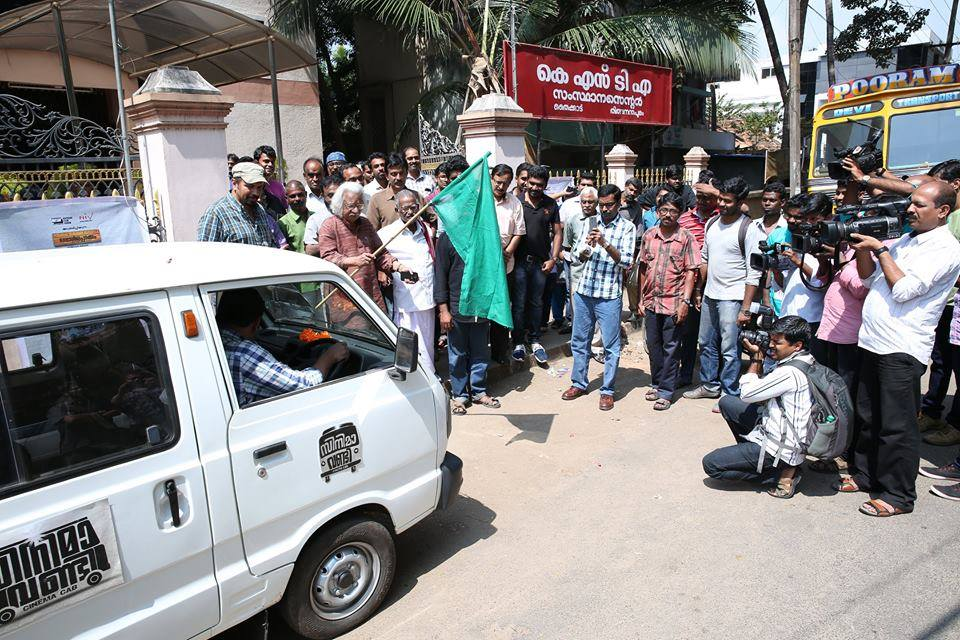
Cinemavandi inauguration

== Film festival ==
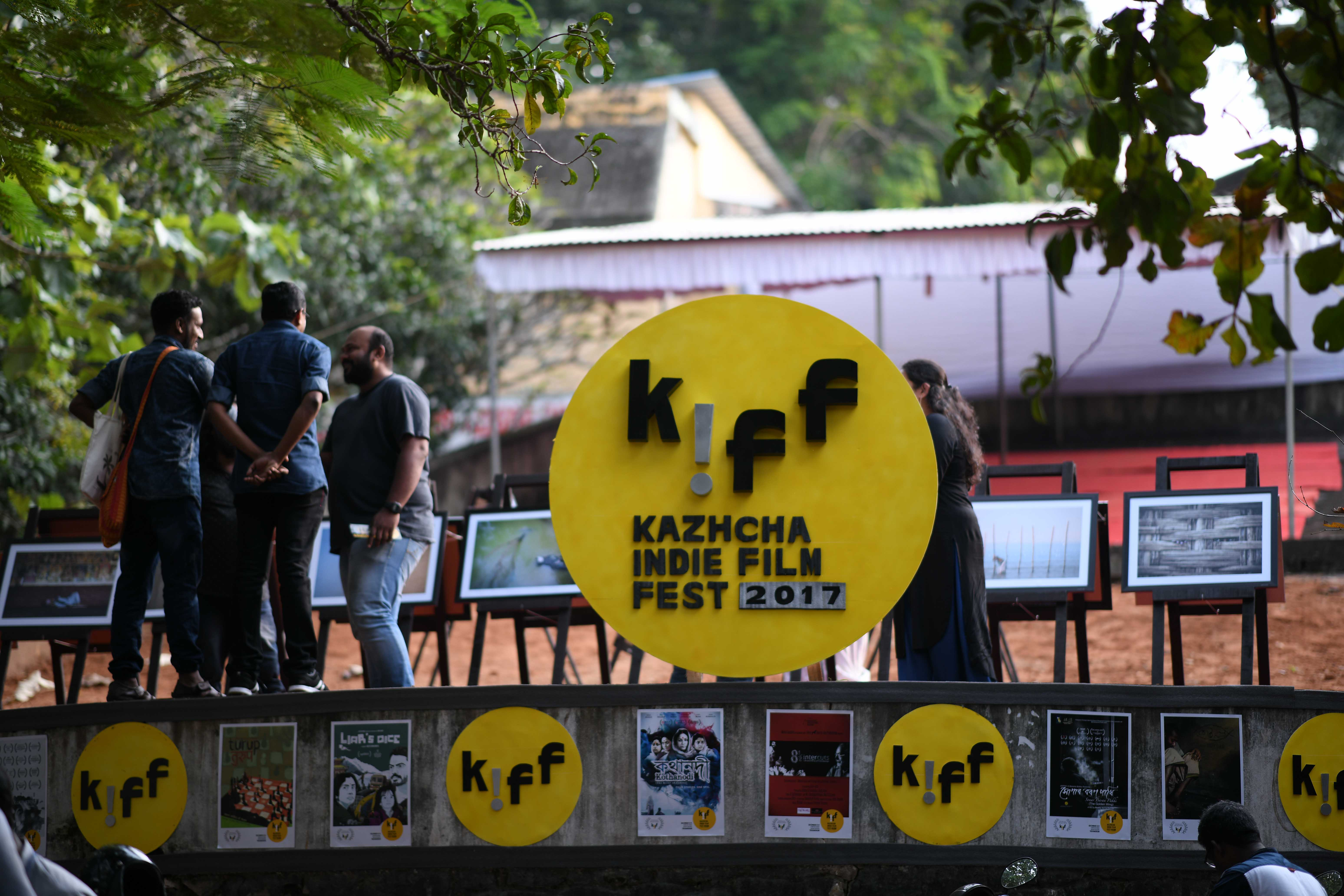
Kazhcha Indie Film Festival 2017

Kazhcha Indie Film Festival started in 2017 to counter the selection process in IFFK. Anand Gandhi inaugurated the festival. The festival runs alongside IFFK for four days. The first edition of the film festival has screened 13 indie films from across the country which were rejected in IFFK. In 2018 Kazhcha renamed the festival as Kniff, Kazhcha-Niv Indie film Fest, partnering with Niv Art Movies.
