= Puthenchery =

Puthenchery is an Indian surname that may refer to the following notable people:

- Girish Puthenchery (1961–2010), Indian Malayalam lyricist, poet, scriptwriter and screenwriter
- Jitin Puthenchery (born 1989), Indian film actor and assistant director, son of Girish
