= Jiju Antony =

Director (b. 1977)

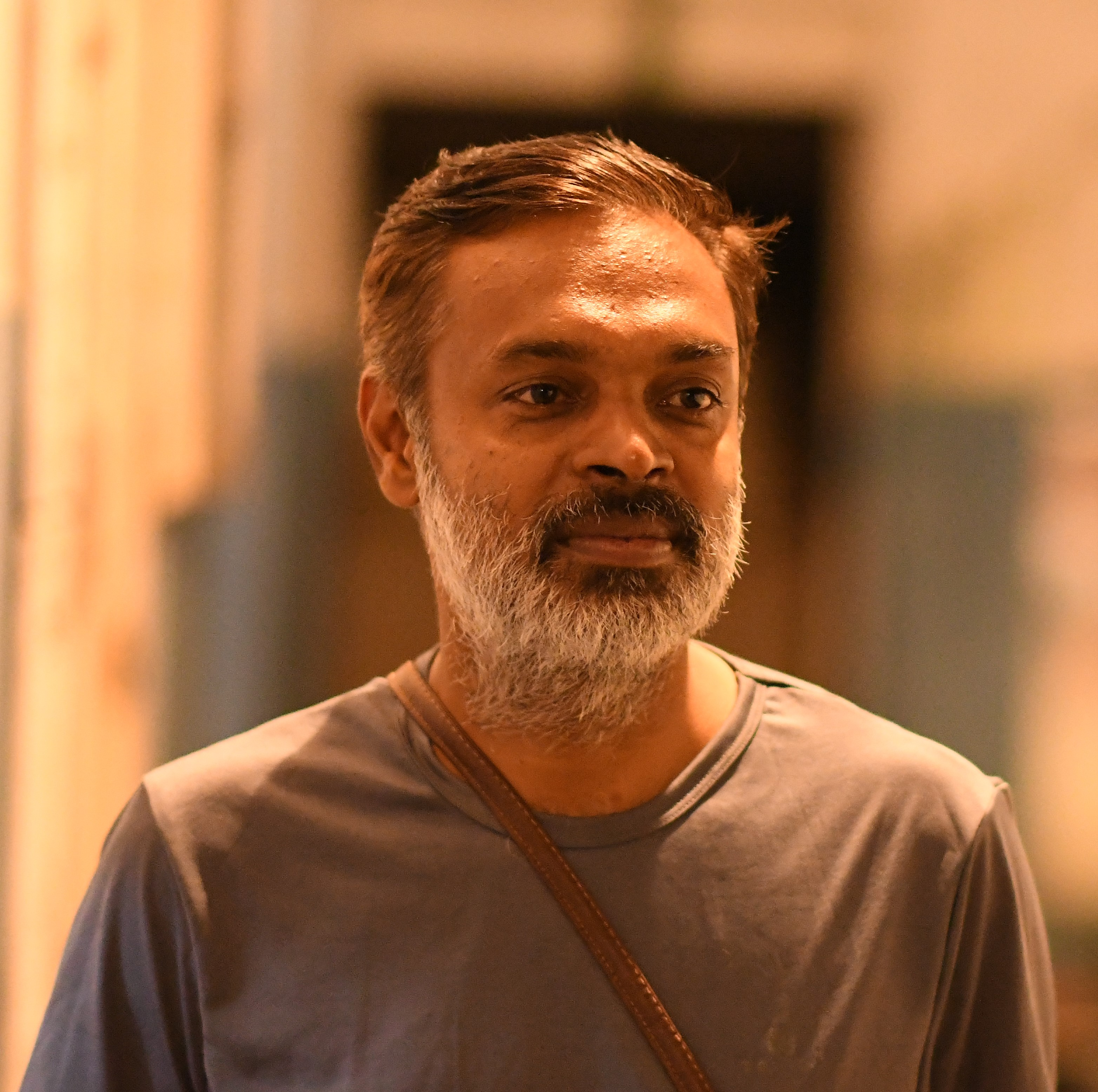
- Born: 18 May 1973 (age 52); Kuzhur, Thrissur
- Occupation: Film Maker
- Years active: 2017 – present

Jiju Antony (born 18 April 1973) is an Indian film director.

== Personal life ==
Jiju Antony was born in Kuzhur village, Trissur district, Kerala on 18 May 1973. Eli Eli Lama Sabachthani?, Jiju's critically acclaimed debut feature film was well recognised in film festivals.

== Film career ==
He made his first feature film Eli Eli Lama Sabachthani? (film) produced by Kazhcha Chalachithra Vedi and co produced by Niv Art Movies in 2017. The fund was raised through crowd funding. The film was screened in many film festivals in India.
