= Niv Art Centre =

Indian cultural organisation

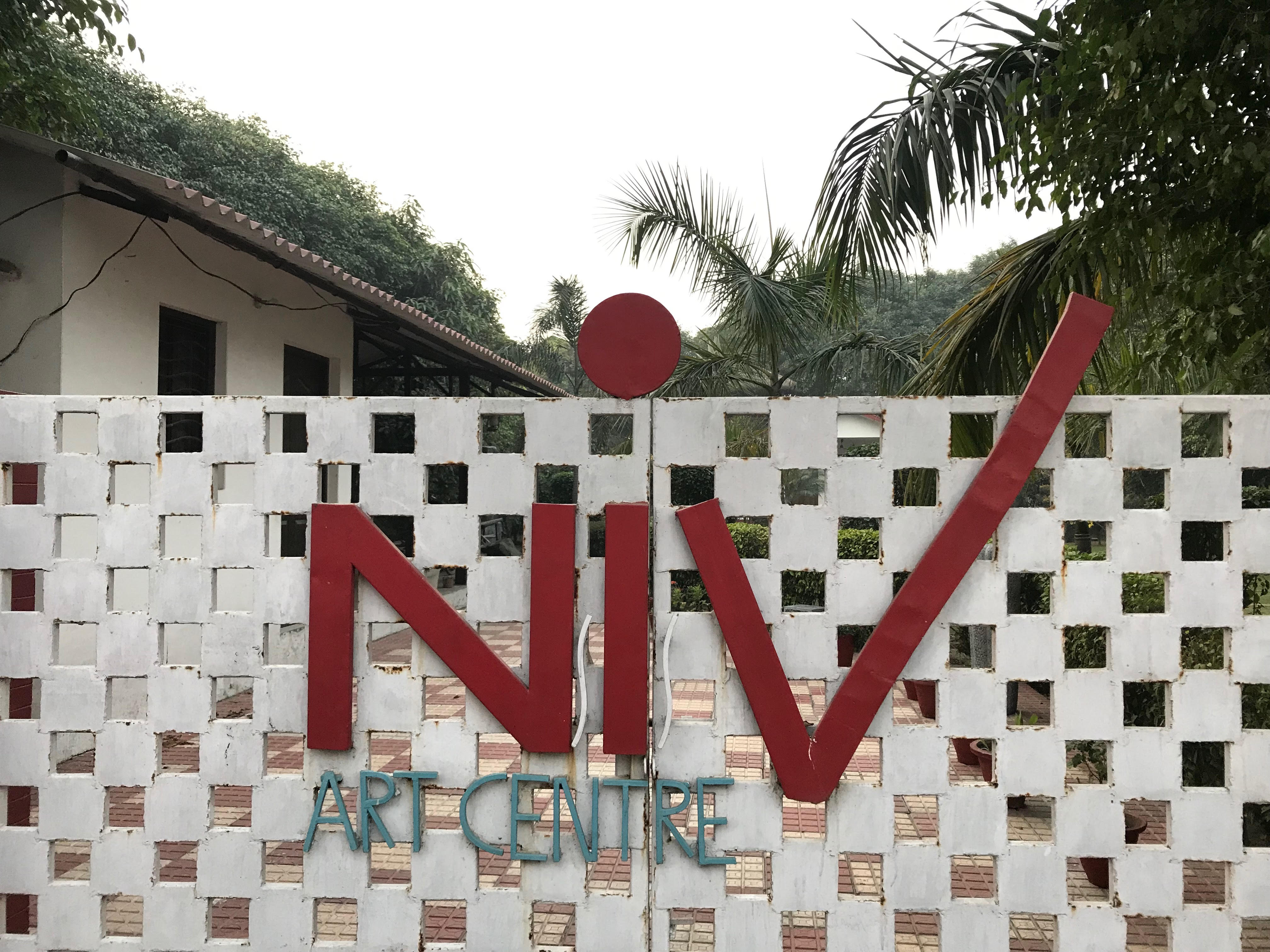
- Genre: Art Gallery
- Location(s): New Delhi
- Country: India
- Years active: 2008–present
- Founded: 2008

Niv Art Centre is an Indian Art and Cultural Organisation in New Delhi, established in 2008. It is running an independent film festival in Kerala called Kazhcha-Niv Indie film Fest (KNIFF) along with Kazhcha Chalachithra Vedi called (KNIFF).

== Art exhibitions ==
Niv Art Centre has been facilitating art exhibitions to young and established artists across the country.

== Art Gallery ==
Niv Art Centre also has an art gallery which provide space for art exhibitions. It had exhibited works of resident artists in Visual Arts Gallery, India Habitat centre, New Delhi. It has also conducted art exhibitions of works by international and Indian artists in association with Lalit Kala Akademi.
