= Sandeep Kurissery =

Indian audio engineer

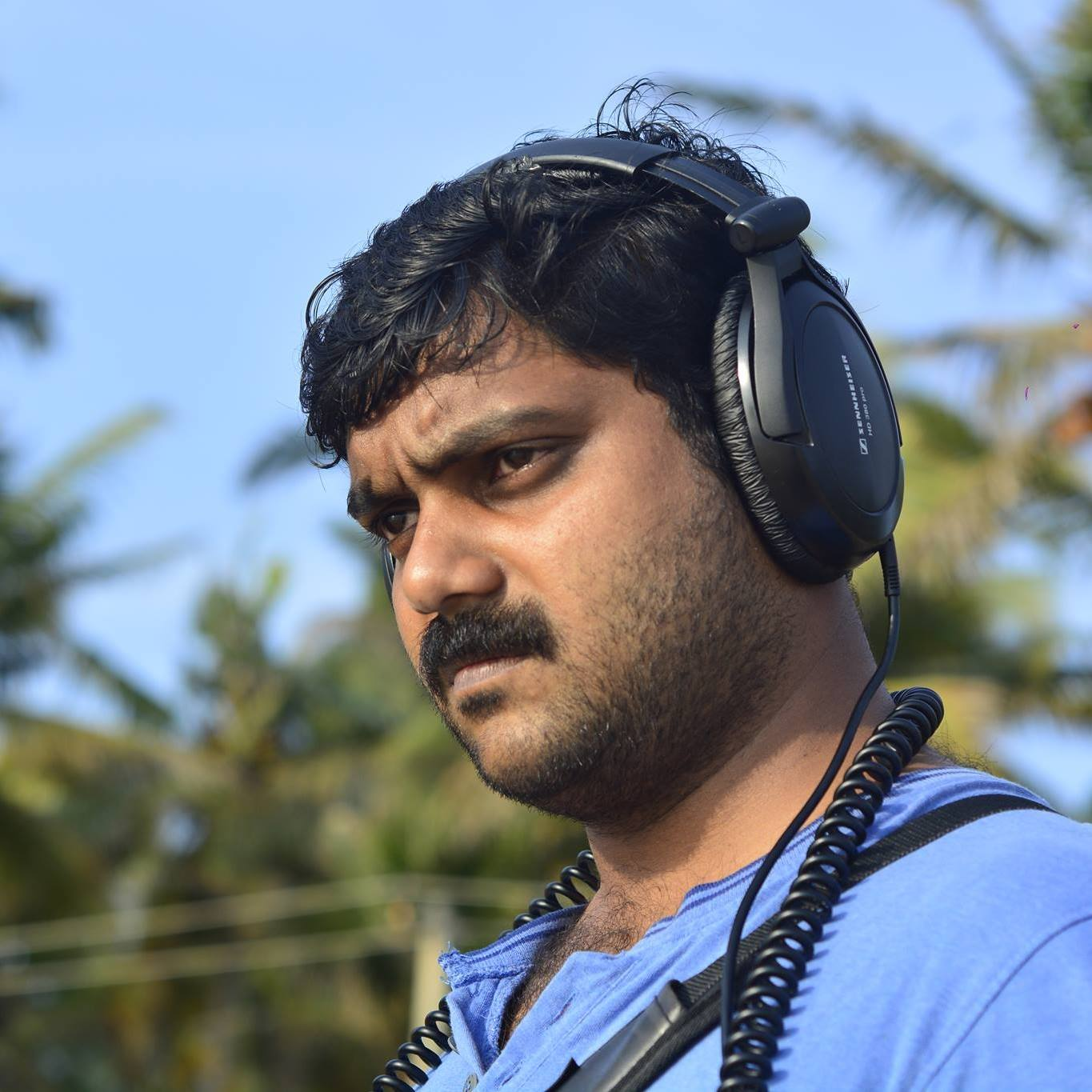
- Born: 29 March 1982 (age 44); Vanchiyoor, Thiruvananthapuram, Kerala, India
- Occupation: Film sound design Production sound mixer
- Years active: 2003 - present
- Spouse: Ramya
- Children: 1

Sandeep Kurissery (sometimes credited Sandeep Madhavam) (born 29 March 1982) is an Indian film sound designer, sound editor and location sound recordist. He, along with Jiji P Joseph won the first ever award for location sound recording for the film Oraalppokkam in the 2014 Kerala State Film Awards. The duo won the award again in 2015 with Ozhivudivasathe Kali. Sandeep has worked with some of the leading filmmakers in South India like Girish Kasaravalli, Shaji N Karun, Vipin Vijay and Shyamaprasad.

== Early life ==
He was born to Mohan Kurissery and Retnakala in Vanchiyoor in Thiruvananthapuram, Kerala. He is the grandson of author and scholar Kurissery Gopala Pillai (paternal) and Ayurvedic physician Dr. R.P Chittezham (maternal).

After completing his schooling in SMV High School, Thiruvananthapuram, Sandeep graduated from Govt. Arts College, Thiruvananthapuram. Realising his passion for audio, he took a diploma in audio engineering from SAE Technology College, Chennai where G V Prakash Kumar was his classmate. He also has a diploma in Journalism and Communication from the University of Kerala.

== Career ==
Sandeep's career as an audio engineer started in Kairali TV in 2003. His recording work in shows like "Thaaraattu" and "Kottayam Nazeer Show" were particularly noteworthy. From 2006 to 2021, he worked with Mazhavil Manorama and Manorama News.

Interested in music and sounds from an early age, he has been associated with documentaries and short films as musician, sound recordist and sound designer. He has also been involved in "Kaathoram", an initiative to bring out free audiobooks in Malayalam. His work in the short film "Amguleechaalitham" led to director Sanal Kumar Sasidharan inviting him to join the crew of Oraalppokkam.

== Personal life ==
Sandeep is married to Ramya, who is a journalist. They have a son, Madhav.

== Filmography ==
Year	Film	Category	Roles
2003	Athijeevanathinte Gaadha	Documentary	Background Music
2010	Will you be there?	Short film	Screenplay, Background Music, Location sound, Sound design
2013	Amguleechaalitham	Short film	Location sound, Sound mixing, Sound design (Also Associate Producer)
2014	Oraalppokkam	Feature film	Location sound
2015	Images/Reflections	Documentary	Location sound (with T. Krishnanunni)
2015	Ozhivudivasathe Kali	Feature film	Location sound
2015	Savam	Feature film	Location sound, Sound mixing, Sound design
2016	Eli Eli Lama Sabachthani?	Feature film	Location sound
2016	The Thinking Body	Documentary	Location sound
2017	Prathibhasam	Feature film	Location sound
2017	Athisayangalude Venal (The Summer of Miracles)	Feature film	Location sound, sound designer and associate producer
2018	Rosa Lima	Short Film	Location sound, sound designer
2019	1956, Madhya Thiruvithaamkoor	Feature film	Location sound
2020	Kaasiminte Kadal	Feature film	Location sound (With Sooraj Shankar)
2021	Viral Sebi	Feature film	Sound design
2022	Karayile Pathira Rahasyam	Short film	Sound design, Sound mixing
2022	Keedam	Feature film	Sound design
2023	Higuita	Feature film	Sound design
2023	Nila	Feature film	Sound design
2023	Daayam	Feature film	Sound design, Location sound
2024	Swakaryam Sambhava Bahulam	Feature film	Sound design
2024	Manorathangal	Web Series	Sound design, Location sound (Segment: Kazhcha by Shyamaprasad)
2025	Ithiri Neram	Feature film	Sound design, Location sound
2026	Slow	Short film	Sound Design, Re-recording Mixing
