= Jiji P Joseph =

Indian sound recordist

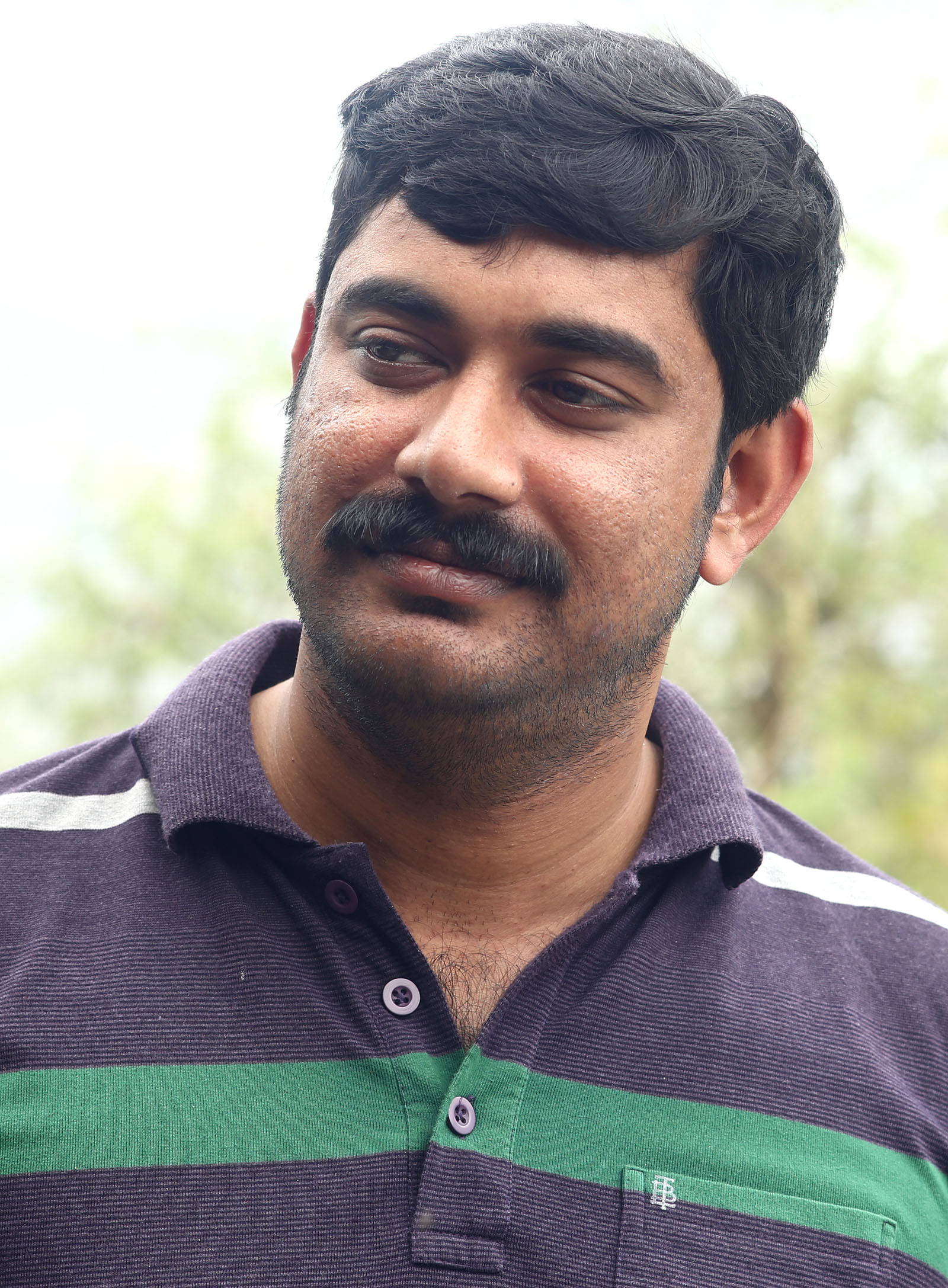
- Born: 5 March 1981 (age 45)
- Occupations: Production sound mixer; sound designer; film editor
- Years active: 2010–present
- Spouse: Sonia Joseph
- Children: 2
- Parents: Joseph Varghese; Mariyamma Joseph

Jiji Panaparampil Joseph, also known as Jijimon Joseph (born 5 March 1981) is a location sound recordist, sound designer and film editor in Indian film industry. He won the first ever Kerala State Film Award 2014 for location sound recording for the film Oraalppokkam and the consecutive year for the film Ozhivudivasathe Kali in fraternization with Sandeep Kurissery (now known as Sandeep Madhavam). He has fashioned his film career collaborating on feature films and short films in Malayalam cinema.

== Biography ==
Jiji Joseph was born in Kanjirappally, Kerala, India to Joseph Varghese and Mariyamma Joseph, the youngest of four children. The dynamics and technicalities of film making was always a fascinating part of his dream and he had dreamed of being a part of the feature films. At the completion of schooling, he obtained diplomas in multimedia and computer hardware. Later, he gained an advanced diploma in digital editing and audio engineering from Keltron Advanced Training Centre, Sasthamangalam, Trivandrum.

== Career ==
He started his career as a cable network technician in his neighborhood. After 7 years of satellite communication service, he began his professional career as a video editor in Shalom TV in 2008. He moved to Manorama News (MMTV) in 2009 and continued the same profession until 2011. He also served as senior video editor in Goodness TV from 2012 through 2014.

== Career in films ==
In 2010, he committed for the first time to collaborate with a short film Will you be there? by Sandeep Kurissery and in 2013, he worked along with Sandeep as location sound recordist and editor for another short film Amguleechaalitham ("Manipulated by fingers") by Prasanth Vijay. In 2014, in collaboration with Sandeep, he did the location sound for the first feature film Oraalppokkam ("Six Feet High") directed by Sanal Kumar Sasidharan, that brought him the Kerala State Film Award for the Best Sync Sound (location sound) in 2014. The following year, he committed his second project again with Sanal Kumar Sasidharan for his feature film Ozhivudivasathe Kali ("An Off day Game") that carried for a second time the Kerala State Film Award 2015 for the Best Sync Sound. In 2015, he did the location sound for the film Savam ("The Corpse") directed by Don Palathra. He recorded the location sound for the Marathi/Hindi film Eli Eli Lama Sabachthani? ("The Forsaken") directed by Jiju Antony in 2016. He worked as location sound recordist, sound designer (along with Sandeep Kurissery) and film editor in the feature film Athisayangalude Venal ("The Summer of Miracles") directed by Prasanth Vijay in 2017.

== Personal life ==
Jiji is married to Sonia. The couple have two children, Elon J Joseph and Eian J Joseph. He belongs from Chotty, a small village situated between Kanjirappally and Mundakayam, in the district of Kottayam, Kerala, India. He lives in Taunton, Somerset, United Kingdom.

== Filmography and awards ==
Year	Film	Language	Category	Roles	Achievements
2010	Will you be there?	Malayalam	Short Film	Editor	
2013	Amguleechaalitham (Manipulated By Fingers)	Malayalam	Short Film	Location sound and editor	
2014	Oraalppokkam (Six Feet High)	Malayalam	Feature Film	Location sound	Kerala State Film Award
2015	Ozhivudivasathe Kali (An Off-Day Game)	Malayalam	Feature Film	Location sound	Kerala State Film Award
2015	Savam (The Corpse)	Malayalam	Feature Film	Location sound, sound mixing, Sound designer	
2016	Eli Eli Lama Sabachthani? (The Forsaken)	Marathi-Hindi	Feature Film	Location sound	
2017	Prathibhasam (The Tetrahedron)	Malayalam	Feature Film	Location sound	
2017	Athisayangalude Venal (The Summer of Miracles)	Malayalam	Feature Film	Location sound, film editor, sound designer and associate producer	
2018	Rosa Lima	Malayalam	Short Film	Location sound, sound designer	
2019	1956, Madhyathiruvithamkoor	Malayalam	Feature film	Location sound	

== Film festivals ==
- Eli Eli Lama Sabacthani - Mumbai Film Festival - Official Selection, October 2017
- Athisayangalude Venal - Mumbai Film Festival - Official Selection, October 2017
- Athisayangalude Venal - Kerala Film Festival - Official Selection, December 2017
