= Kazhcha-Niv Independent Film Festival =

Film festival in Thiruvananthapuram, Kerala, India

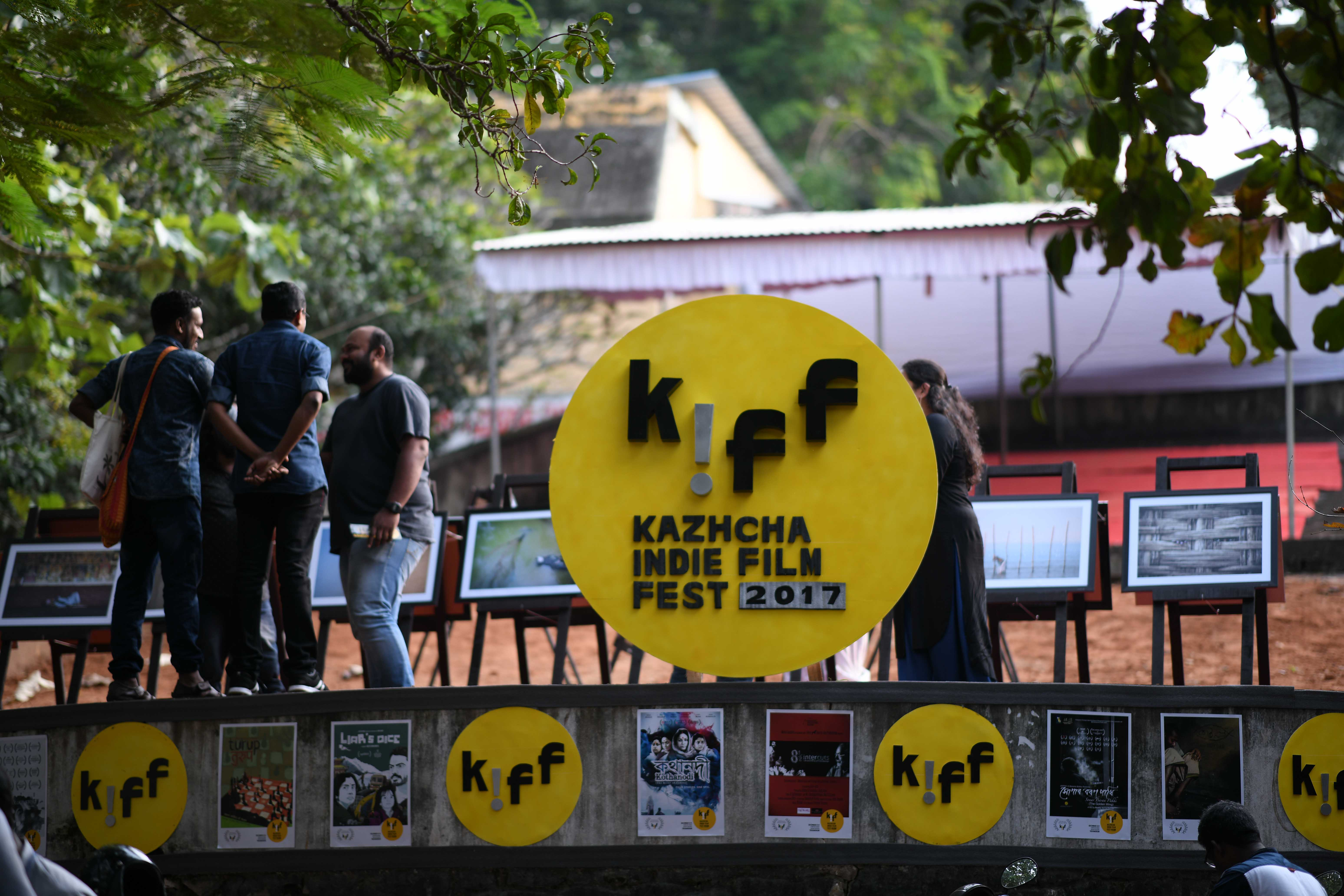
- Location: Thiruvananthapuram, Kerala
- Hosted by: Kazhcha Chalachithra Vedi, Niv Art Centre
- Festival date: December
- Language: International
- Website: www.kniff.in

The Kazhcha-Niv Independent Film Festival (KNIFF) is a film festival for independent cinema in India held annually in Thiruvananthapuram. The festival debuted in 2017, and is hosted by Kazhcha Chalachithra Vedi, a local film society, in collaboration with Niv Art Centre, an Art and Cultural society in New Delhi. The festival is held in December parallel to the International Film Festival of Kerala (IFFK).

== History ==
The festival was launched to overcome the rejection process in the International Film Festival of Kerala. Director Sanal Kumar Sasidharan pulled his film, Sexy Durga, which had previously won Tiger Award in the International Film Festival Rotterdam (IFFR) from the Malayalam Cinema Today section of IFFK, and alleged that the festival was not giving due respect to independent films. Following the incident, Kazhcha Chalachithra Vedi announced the new festival. The first year of the festival was inaugurated by Anand Gandhi, the director of Ship of Theseus.

== Festivals ==
=== 2017 ===
The 2017 edition presented Karie directed by Shanavas Naranippuzha, a Malayalam satire on caste, An Insignificant Man, Vith, Thooppu, Kothanodi, Ralang Road, The Golden Wing, Machines, Eli Eli Lama Sabachthani?, Juze, Ashwatthama, A Billion Colour Story, Turup, Samantharashramangal, Eight And A Half Intercuts: Life And Films Of K.G George and Richter Scale 7.6.

=== 2018 ===
The 2018 edition took Inclusion as its theme and was inaugurated by screenwriter and LGBTQ activist Apurva Asrani. Bird of Dusk, a documentary on Rituparno Ghosh by Sangeeta Datta who challenged gender boundaries with this life and work, was the opening film.
