= Jitin Puthenchery =

Indian actor

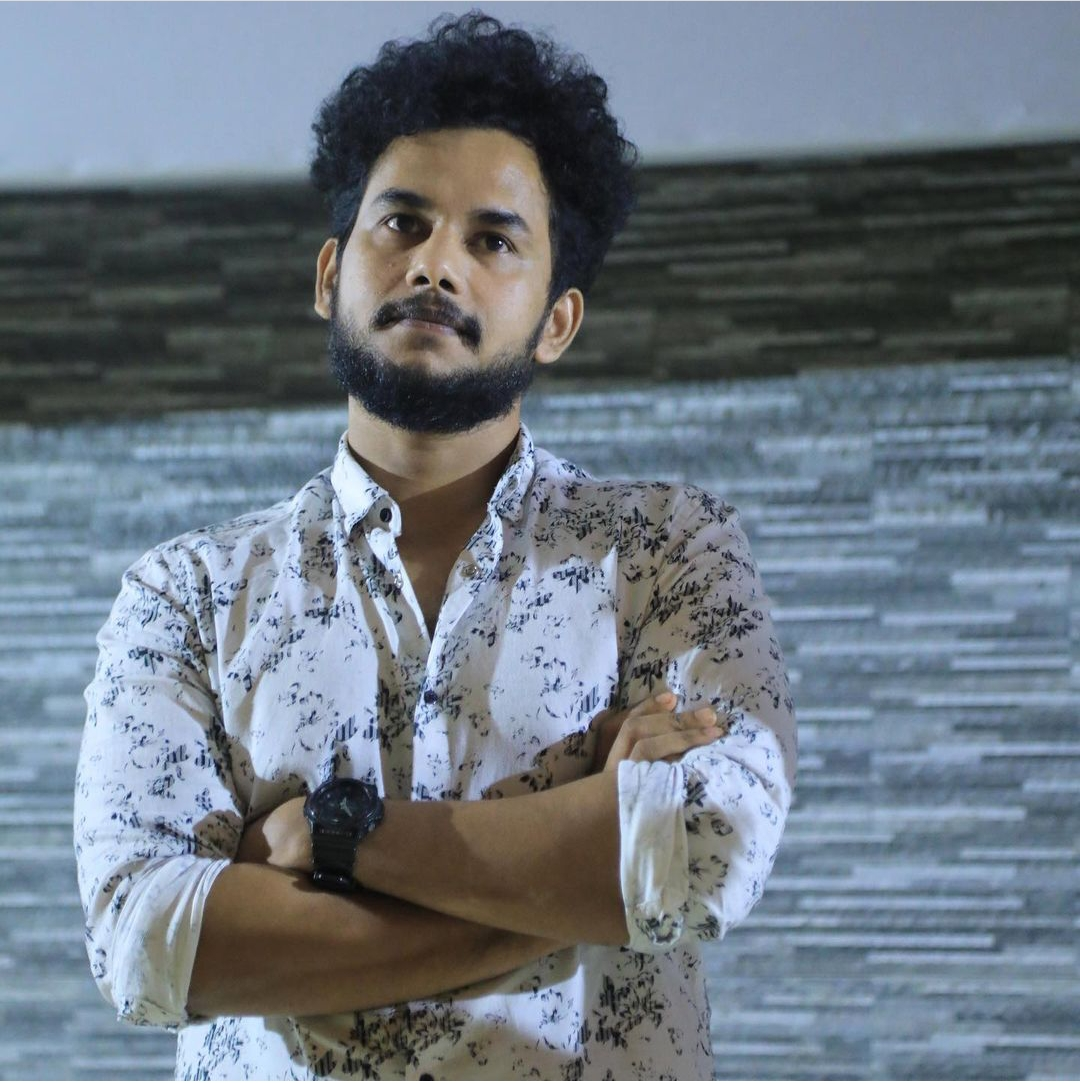
- Jitin Puthenchery in January 2021
- Born: 24 August 1989 (age 36); Puthanchery, Kozhikode, Kerala, India
- Occupations: Actor; Assistant Director; Co-writer
- Years active: 2012–present
- Parents: Father : Girish Puthenchery; Brother : Din Nath Puthenchery

Jitin Puthenchery (born 24 August 1989) is an Indian film actor and assistant director who works predominantly in the Malayalam film industry. He is the son of popular Malayalam lyricist and poet Girish Puthenchery.

== Life and career ==
Jitin was born on 24 August 1989 and is the elder son of Gireesh Puthenchery and Beena. Jitin was born in karaparamba near Eranhipalam in Kozhikode district of kerala. He completed his primary education at St. Joseph's Boys' High School Kozhikode and graduation at Bangalore University. He is married to Divya Mohanan, a software engineer. His younger brother Din Nath is a lyricist and Assistant director

Jitin made his debut in the Malayalam film industry as an assistant director in 2013 through Sudhir Ambalappad's movie Breaking News Live. He later worked as an assistant director in Matini, Koothara and Mani Ratnam.in 2016, he joined Farhan Akhtar-Riteish Sidwani team's Excel Entertainment, a Mumbai-based film production company, and later worked as a director's assistant on Farhan's Rock-On 2.

In 2016 he starred in his friend Dominic Arun's short film Mrityunjaya. He later appeared in a small role in Dominic's Tovino movie Tharangam, he also worked as a co-writer and assistant director for Tharangam . Later he was auditioned for Shankar Ramakrishnan's debut movie Pathinettam Padi, in which he played the role of a state school student named Giri and he was notable for portraying the character.

He later starred in popular Malayalam director Kamal's movie Pranaya Meenukalude Kadal Tovino's Edakkad Battalion and the Mohalal-Priyadarshan team's Maraikar Arabikadalinte Simham. in 2021 he won critical acclaim for his portrayal of the protagonist in Don Palathara's movie Santhoshathinte Onnam Rahasyam .

== Filmography ==
Year	Movie	Assistant Director	Role	Director	Notes
2012	Matinee	Yes	No	Aneesh Upasana	
2013	Breaking News Live	Yes	No	Sudhir Ambalapadu	
2014	Koothara	Yes	No	Srinath Rajendran	
2014	Money Ratnam	Yes	No	Santhosh Nair	
2016	Rock On 2	Yes	No	Shujaat Saudagar	
2017	Tharangam	Yes	Cook	Dominic Arun	Co-writer
2019	Pranaya Meenukalude Kadal	No	Koya Mon	Kamal	
2019	Pathinettam Padi	No	Giri	Shanker Ramakrishnan	
2019	Edakkad Battalion 06	No	Battalion Boy	Swapnesh K Nair	
2021	The Priest	No	Manu	Jophin T Chako	
2021	Santhoshathinte Onnam Rahasyam	No	Jitin	Don Palathara	
2021	Marakkar: Lion of the Arabian Sea	No	Young Achuthan	Priyadarshan	
2023	Neelavelicham	No	Podiyan	Aashiq Abu	
2024	Ajayante Randam Moshanam	No	Felix	Jithin Laal	
