= Niv Art Movies =

Indian film production company

- Genre: Production Company
- Location: New Delhi
- Country: India
- Years active: 2008–present
- Founded: 2008

Niv Art Movies is a film production company in New Delhi state, India established in the year 2008. Shaji Mathew, a Delhi based Malayali is the proprietor of the firm. It has produced 6 Malayalam films 5 out of the 6 films produced by the company are directed by Sanal Kumar Sasidharan

== Films ==
- Dooram
- Oraalppokkam
- Ozhivudivasathe Kali
- Sexy Durga
- Unmadiyude Maranam
- Chola

First film produced by Niv Art Movies is Dooram directed by Manu Kannanthanam. Niv Art Movies Co-Produced Oraalppokkam directed by Sanal Kumar Sasidharan and the association between the director and the production house thus started. Ozhivudivasathe Kali was the first independent production of Niv Art Movies with Sanal. The film won the best feature film award in Kerala State Film Awards 2015. Sexy Durga which was again directed by Sanal Kumar Sasidharan won the topmost award, the Tiger award in the International Film Festival Rotterdam

== Awards ==
  - Kerala State Film Awards : Ozhivudivasathe Kali won the best film award in the Kerala State Film Awards in 2015
- Tiger Award in IFFR : Sexy Durga has bagged the biggest award in the International Film Festival Rotterdam. The film has become the first ever Indian film to bag the award.

== Filmography ==
Year	Title	Notes	
2014	Oraalppokkam	Chief Co Producer; First online crowd funded feature film in Malayalam	
2015	Ozhivudivasathe Kali	Feature film 2015 Kerala State Film Award for Best Film	
2015	Dooram	Feature film 2016	
2017	Sexy Durga	Feature film 2017 Hivos Tiger Award International Film Festival Rotterdam	
2019	Nani	Feature film	2019 Kerala State Film Award for Best Children's Film
2019	Unmadiyude Maranam	Feature film	
2018	Chola	Feature film	
