= Unni R. =

Indian short-story writer and screenwriter

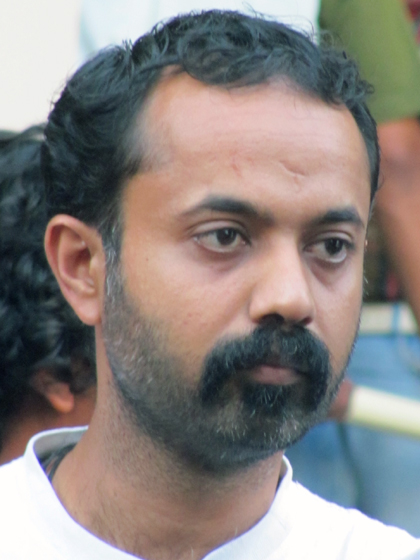
- Unni R. in 2010
- Born: P. Jayachandran; 12 April 1971 (age 55); Kottayam, Kerala, India
- Occupations: short story writer; screenwriter
- Parents: N. Parameswaran Nair; K. A. Radhamma

Parameswaran Jayachandran (born 12 April 1971) better known by his pen name Unni R., is an Indian short-story writer and screenwriter, who is known for his work in Malayalam literature and Malayalam cinema. Born in Kudamaloor in Kottayam district, he is currently based in Thiruvananthapuram, Kerala, India. He studied in Kudamaloor LP school, CMS college High school, CMS College Kottayam and Baselius College, Kottayam. Unni R. won the Kerala State Film Award for Best Screenplay for the film Charlie (2015).

== Career ==
For the story of same name, he has received the Kerala Sahithya Academy Geetha Hiranyan Endowment, Anganam-E.P. Sushama Endowment and Thomas Mundasseri Award. Ozhivudivasathe Kali has been later made into the film of the same name by Director Sanal Shashidaran. It won the 46th Kerala State Award for Best Film in 2015. He was a recipient of several awards including K.A. Kodunalloor Award and T.P Kishore Memorial Award (both for Praanilokam); V.P. Shivakumar Memorial Award and SBT Award (both for Mudraraakshasam); as well as Abu Dhabi Shakti Award and Ayanam C.V. Sriraman Award (both for Kottayam 17).

His works have been translated into English and other Indian languages such as Tamil. His Leela and Bhootam were translated for the Tamil monthly magazine Kaalachuvadu by Tamil poet Sukumaran. Kalinaadakam which was translated to Tamil has been widely read and noted Tamil writer Perumal Murukan opined in his 19th D.C. Kizhakemuri Memorial lecture that Unni R.’s stories have extensive readership in Tamil Nadu along with the veterans such as Thakazhi Sivasankara Pillai, Vaikom Muhammad Basheer, M.T. Vasudevan Nair and Madhavikutty. Several of his articles, including one on Nakulan and on Madhavikutty, were also translated to Tamil and English. Indian Literature, a bi-monthly journal of Sahitya Academy featured his translated stories – Catwalk (Vol.231/2006) and Pedestrian named Badushah (Vol 260/2010). Malayalam Literary Survey (Jan-Mar 2008) published the translation of his short story, The Kali Play.

Besides screen writing, he has also acted as supporting roles in Aparahnam, Chappakurishu, Munnariyippu etc. He started his career as a sub-editor in the Karpooram Weekly, Kottayam, Kerala (1994-1995). He also worked as a Producer in Asianet Satellite Communications for a long period of time (1995-2013).

Unni R.'s short story "Vaanku" won the 2020 Kerala Sahitya Akademi Award for Story and was made into the 2021 film of the same name.

== Bibliography ==
=== Short story Collections ===
- Ozhivu Divasathe Kali
- Kali Nadakam
- Kottayam 17
- Kadhakal
- Oru Bhayankara Kamukan
- One hell of a lover, selection of short stories translated from the Malayalam by J. Devika, Chennai: Eka, 2019.

=== Other works ===
- Chumbikkunna Manushyar Chumbikkatha Manushyar (Essays)
- Basheer (Editor, Essays)
- Prathi Poovan Kozhi (Novel )

== Filmography ==
Year	Film	Credited as			Notes
Year	Film	Story	Script	Dialogue	Notes
2007	Big B	No	No	Yes	
2009	Kerala Cafe	Yes	Yes	Yes	Segment: Bridge
2010	Anwar	No	No	Yes	
2011	Chaappa Kurishu	No	Yes	Yes	Co-written with Sameer Thahir.
2012	Bachelor Party	No	Yes	Yes	Co-written with Santhosh Echikkanam.
2013	5 Sundarikal	No	Yes	Yes	Segment: Kullante Bharya
2014	Munnariyippu	No	Yes	Yes	
2015	Ozhivudivasathe Kali	Yes	No	No	Kerala State Film Award 2015 -Best Film
2015	Charlie	Yes	Yes	Yes	Script and dialogues co-written with Martin Prakkat. Kerala State Film Award 2015 – Best Screenplay
2016	Leela	Yes	Yes	Yes	
2019	Prathi Poovankozhi	Yes	Yes	Yes	
2022	Naaradhan	Yes	Yes	Yes	
2026	Kattalan	No	No	Yes	
2026	Bachelor Party D'eux	No	No	Yes	
TBA	Oru Bhayankara Kamukan †	Yes	Yes	Yes	
TBA	Bilal †	No	No	Yes	

== Awards and honours ==
- Kerala State Film Award 2015 (Best Screenplay) - Charlie
- Geetha Hiranyan Endovement – Ozhivu Divasathe Kali (2006)
- Thomas Mundasseri Award – Ozhivudivasathe Kali
- Ankanam E.P. Sushama Endovement – Ozhivu Divasathe Kali
- Abu Dhabi Sakthi Award – Kottayam 17
- Ayanam C. V. Sreeraman Award – Kottayam 17
- K. A. Kodungalloor Story Award
- T. P. Kishore Award
- V. P. Sivakumar Memorial Keli Award
- Mohan Raghavan Award for Best Script - Charlie
- IIFA Award for Best story - Charlie
