= Charlie (2015 Malayalam film) =

2015 film by Martin Prakkat

- Theatrical poster
- Directed by: Martin Prakkat
- Screenplay by: Martin Prakkat; Unni R.
- Story by: Unni R.
- Produced by: Shebin Becker; Joju George; Martin Prakkat
- Starring: Dulquer Salmaan; Parvathy; Aparna Gopinath; Nedumudi Venu; Soubin Shahir
- Cinematography: Jomon T. John
- Edited by: Shameer Muhammed
- Music by: Gopi Sunder
- Production company: Finding Cinema
- Distributed by: Playhouse Release, Tricolor Entertainment
- Release date: 24 December 2015
- Running time: 135 minutes
- Country: India
- Language: Malayalam
- Box office: ₹42 crores

Charlie is a 2015 Indian Malayalam-language adventure drama film directed by Martin Prakkat and written by Prakkat and Unni R. Produced by Prakkat, Joju George and Shebin Becker, the film stars Dulquer Salmaan and Parvathy. The music is composed by Gopi Sundar, while Jomon T. John handles the cinematography. The film released on 24 December. It won 8 awards at the 46th Kerala State Film Awards, including Best Actor, Best Actress, Best Director and Best Cinematography. It was remade into Bengali as Surjo and Marathi and Tamil as Deva and Maara, respectively.

== Plot ==
Tessa is a graphic artist who runs away from home to avoid an unwanted marriage that her family has finalized for her. With the help of her journalist friend, she acquires a rented apartment in a dilapidated house. Initially, she hates the tattered place, but soon she learns that the room was previously occupied by a carefree vagabond named Charlie. When she starts cleaning up, she discovers a photo and a graphic novel about this man. The sketches in the novel depict the events from the previous New Year's Eve when a small-time thief tried to rob the Charlie's room. In a turn-of-events, Charlie joined him in his nightly theft routine and snuck up on the roof of another house. But there, they encountered something shocking that left them stunned. The novel stops there abruptly with sketches of the dumbstruck faces of Charlie and the thief on the last page. This piques Tessa's curiosity about the rest of the story, as well as the previous occupant of the room.

Intrigued, Tessa starts looking for the people in the man's sketches. Backtracking his steps, she meets the man's "father" (who is more of a friend). She also comes across a boat servant named "Pathrose" who tells her the story of Mariya/Queen Mary. Mariya was a middle-aged woman, who was sexually exploited by her procurer husband in her youth. Once, Charlie took the now terminally ill Mariya to the sea at midnight with the help of Pathrose for her birthday. But Mariya jumped into the ocean to her death, that left Charlie with shock and lasting grief. Following up on more clues, Tessa gets news that Charlie is staying in a hotel and rushes to meet him. However, she misses him just by a few seconds. Later a helper boy in the hotel explains to her that Charlie had just rescued Mariya's daughter from her father's exploitation, after creating a ruckus.

A few days later, by the stroke of luck, Tessa meets the thief depicted in that man's sketches and inquiries about the rest of the story from New Year's Eve. He tells her that on that day, they had encountered a young woman on the verge of suicide, and his sir (Charlie) stopped her from hanging herself, after which she escaped from the scene on her bike. Tessa and the thief locate the woman's house and finally identify her as Dr. Kani from the latter's father.

Tessa travels to Ooty to find Kani and inquires about her story. Kani explains that she was depressed over her broken relationship when she did her first independent operation, leading to the death of a 10-year-old girl. Further hooked by the media, she was desperate and about to commit suicide on new year's Eve when she was distracted by that man (Charlie). He brought her to a shelter home maintained by Kunjappan in Ooty and she has been living there since. Kunjappan, an old man, is a hopeless romantic who is waiting for his teenage love Thresia to show up.

Tessa spends a good time in Ooty but her trip comes to an abrupt end as her brother and mother find her and take her home against her wishes. While a depressed Tessa is on her way back home, Charlie returns with Kunjappan's long lost love Thresia, who is a nun now, and they again miss each other by a few seconds.

Later, Kani informs Charlie about Tessa, and he admits knowing about her and her search for him. Though initially reluctant to love, Charlie is forced to rethink after hearing Kunjappan and Kani. Next morning, he sneaks out early and informs Kani that he will be attending the Thrissur Pooram function, and Tessa can find him there if she's looking for him.

Tessa reaches the Pooram grounds and finds him performing in a magic show. Afterward, he spots her, approaches, and asks her if she wants to have some drink. At first, she introduces herself as Shruti Raman and lets him think that he has met the wrong person. But as the festival starts, Charlie's antics make her confess that she is indeed Tessa and he too reveals his name to be 'Charlie'. As the credits roll, they are seen wandering together towards a new journey in life.

== Cast ==
- Dulquer Salmaan as Charlie
- Parvathy as Tessa
- Aparna Gopinath as Kani
- Nedumudi Venu as Kunjappan
- Chemban Vinod Jose as Mathai/Pathrose
- Kalpana as Queen Mary/ Mariya
- Soubin Shahir as Sunikuttan/ Mr. D'souza
- Neeraj Madhav as Ansari
- P. Balachandran as Usman Ikka
- K.P.A.C.Lalitha as Rahel Ammachi
- Seetha as Tessa's mother
- Reshma Sebastian as Shahina (Tessa's friend)
- Master Minon as Balan Pillai/Room Boy
- Ramesh Pisharody as Sojan
- Jayaraj Warrier as Vaattu Jose
- Surjith Gopinath as Aadu Abootty
- Renji Panicker as Panicker Doctor (guest appearance)
- Joy Mathew as Umer (guest appearance)
- Tovino Thomas as Georgy (guest appearance)
- Nassar as magician (guest appearance)
- Rajesh Sharma as Queen Mary's Husband

== Spin-off & Remakes ==
The film had a spin-off called Kallan D'couza which was released on 22 January 2022, directed by Jithu K. Jayan based of the character Kallan D'couza portrayed by Soubin Shahir in this film. The film was a box office bomb because of its poor story.

The film was remade into multiple language. Deva (2017) in Marathi which is directed by Murali Nellappa featuring Ankush Chaudhari, Tejaswini Pandit and Spruha Joshi. Maara (2021) in Tamil, directed by Dhilip Kumar featuring R. Madhavan, Shraddha Srinath and Sshivada. Also in Bengali as Surjo (2024) directed by Shiladitya Moulick featuring Vikram Chatterjee, Madhumita Sarcar and Darshana Banik.

== Production ==
Principal photography began on 25 May 2015 in Idukki. IBTimes reported that it will be an experimental film and each actor will be spotted in a new look. The film was shot at various locations in Kochi, Munnar and Gujarat. The filming was completed by September 2015.

== Music ==
Charlie

Soundtrack album by Gopi Sunder
- Released: 7 December 2015
- Recorded: 2015
- Studio: Sound Factory, Cochin
- Genre: Feature film soundtrack
- Length: 27:37
- Label: Muzik 247

Gopi Sunder chronology
Ennu Ninte Moideen (2015)	Charlie (2015)	Two Countries (2015)

The film's soundtrack was composed by Gopi Sunder and the lyrics were written by Rafeeq Ahamed and Santhosh Varma. The songs were released on 7 December 2015. "Chithirathira" sung by Vijay Yesudas was released separately on 21 December. A promotional video of Dulquer Salmaan singing "Chundari Penne" was released on 24 December.

Track listing
No.	Title	Lyrics	Singer(s)	Length
1.	"Akale"	Rafeeq Ahammed	Malgudi Shubha	3:59
2.	"Pularikalo"	Rafeeq Ahammed	Shakthisree Gopalan, Md. Maqbool Mansoor	5:46
3.	"Puthumazhayai — Version I"	Rafeeq Ahammed	Shreya Ghoshal	4:33
4.	"Oru Kari Mukilinu"	Rafeeq Ahammed	Vijay Prakash	4:41
5.	"Sneham Nee Naadha"	Rafeeq Ahammed	Rajalakshmi	4:05
6.	"Puthumazhayai — Version II"	Rafeeq Ahammed	Divya S. Menon	4:33
7.	"Chithirathira"	Santhosh Varma	Vijay Yesudas	4:39
8.	"Chundari Penne"	Santhosh Varma	Dulquer Salmaan	3:55
Total length:				36:11

== Accolades ==
List of accolades received by Charlie
Accolades
Award	Won	Nominated
Asianet Film Awards	2	2
Asiavision Awards	1	1
Filmfare Awards South	0	7
IIFA Utsavam	7	11
Kerala State Film Awards	8	8
Mirchi Music Awards South	4	7
North American Film Awards	8	8
South Indian International Movie Awards	0	6
Vanitha Film Awards	3	3
- Total number of awards and nominations (Note: Awards in certain categories do not have prior nominations and only winners are announced by the jury. For simplification and to avoid errors, each award in this list has been presumed to have had a prior nomination.)
Totals	33	53
- References

Award	Date of ceremony (Note: Date is linked to the article about the awards held that year, wherever possible.)	Category	Recipient(s)	Result	Ref.
Asianet Film Awards	7 February 2016	Best Actress	Parvathy Thiruvothu	Won	
Asianet Film Awards	7 February 2016	Best Supporting Actress	Kalpana	Won	
Asiavision Awards	18 November 2016	Best Music Director (Shared with Kali and Pulimurugan)	Gopi Sundar	Won	
Filmfare Awards South	18 June 2016	Best Film – Malayalam	Charlie	Nominated	
Filmfare Awards South	18 June 2016	Best Director – Malayalam	Martin Prakkat	Nominated	
Filmfare Awards South	18 June 2016	Best Actor – Malayalam	Dulquer Salmaan	Nominated	
Filmfare Awards South	18 June 2016	Best Supporting Actor – Malayalam	Nedumudi Venu	Nominated	
Filmfare Awards South	18 June 2016	Best Supporting Actress – Malayalam	Kalpana	Nominated	
Filmfare Awards South	18 June 2016	Best Music Director – Malayalam	Gopi Sundar	Nominated	
Filmfare Awards South	18 June 2016	Best Lyricist – Malayalam	Rafeeq Ahamed ("Oru Kari Mukilinu")	Nominated	
IIFA Utsavam	28—29 March 2017	Best Film – Malayalam	Charlie	Nominated	
IIFA Utsavam	28—29 March 2017	Best Director – Malayalam	Martin Prakkat	Won	
IIFA Utsavam	28—29 March 2017	Best Story – Malayalam	Unni R.	Won	
IIFA Utsavam	28—29 March 2017	Best Actor – Malayalam	Dulquer Salmaan	Won	
IIFA Utsavam	28—29 March 2017	Best Actress – Malayalam	Parvathy Thiruvothu	Nominated	
IIFA Utsavam	28—29 March 2017	Best Actress in a Supporting Role – Malayalam	Aparna Gopinath	Won	
IIFA Utsavam	28—29 March 2017	Best Performance In A Comic Role – Malayalam	Soubin Shahir	Won	
IIFA Utsavam	28—29 March 2017	Best Music Director – Malayalam	Gopi Sundar	Won	
IIFA Utsavam	28—29 March 2017	Best Lyricist – Malayalam	Santhosh Varma ("Chundari Penne")	Won	
IIFA Utsavam	28—29 March 2017	Best Male Playback Singer – Malayalam	Dulquer Salmaan ("Chundari Penne")	Nominated	
IIFA Utsavam	28—29 March 2017	Best Female Playback Singer – Malayalam	Shreya Ghoshal ("Puthumazhayai")	Nominated	
Kerala State Film Awards	1 March 2016	Best Director	Martin Prakkat	Won	
Kerala State Film Awards	1 March 2016	Best Actor	Dulquer Salmaan	Won	
Kerala State Film Awards	1 March 2016	Best Actress	Parvathy Thiruvothu	Won	
Kerala State Film Awards	1 March 2016	Best Cinematography	Jomon T. John	Won	
Kerala State Film Awards	1 March 2016	Best Screenplay Original	Unni R. & Martin Prakkat	Won	
Kerala State Film Awards	1 March 2016	Best Art Director	Jayashree Lakshmi Narayanan	Won	
Kerala State Film Awards	1 March 2016	Best Processing Lab	Prasad Colour Lab, Mumbai, J. D. & Kiran	Won	
Kerala State Film Awards	1 March 2016	Best Sound Mixing	M. R. Rajakrishnan	Won	
Mirchi Music Awards South	27 July 2016	Album of the Year	Charlie Gopi Sundar	Won	
Mirchi Music Awards South	27 July 2016	Listeners Choice Album of the Year	Charlie Gopi Sundar	Won	
Mirchi Music Awards South	27 July 2016	Music Composer of the Year	Gopi Sundar ("Oru Kari Mukilinu")	Nominated	
Mirchi Music Awards South	27 July 2016	Lyricist of the Year	Rafeeq Ahamed ("Oru Kari Mukilinu")	Won	
Mirchi Music Awards South	27 July 2016	Male Vocalist of the Year	Vijay Prakash ("Oru Kari Mukilinu")	Won	
Mirchi Music Awards South	27 July 2016	Female Vocalist of the Year	Shreya Ghoshal ("Puthumazhayai")	Nominated	
Mirchi Music Awards South	27 July 2016	Song of the Year	"Oru Kari Mukilinu"	Nominated	
North American Film Awards	24 July 2016	Best Film	Charlie	Won	
North American Film Awards	24 July 2016	Best Director	Martin Prakkat	Won	
North American Film Awards	24 July 2016	Best Actor	Dulquer Salmaan	Won	
North American Film Awards	24 July 2016	Best Actress	Parvathy Thiruvothu	Won	
North American Film Awards	24 July 2016	Best Scriptwriter	Unni R. & Martin Prakkat	Won	
North American Film Awards	24 July 2016	Best Music Director	Gopi Sundar	Won	
North American Film Awards	24 July 2016	Best Female Playback Singer	Divya S. Menon ("Puthumazhayai")	Won	
North American Film Awards	24 July 2016	Best Supporting Actress	Kalpana	Won	
South Indian International Movie Awards	30 June – 1 July 2016	Best Film – Malayalam	Charlie	Nominated	
South Indian International Movie Awards	30 June – 1 July 2016	Best Director – Malayalam	Martin Prakkat	Nominated	
South Indian International Movie Awards	30 June – 1 July 2016	Best Actor – Malayalam	Dulquer Salmaan	Nominated	
South Indian International Movie Awards	30 June – 1 July 2016	Best Actress in a Supporting Role – Malayalam	Kalpana	Nominated	
South Indian International Movie Awards	30 June – 1 July 2016	Best Male Playback Singer – Malayalam	Dulquer Salmaan ("Chundari Penne")	Nominated	
South Indian International Movie Awards	30 June – 1 July 2016	Best Female Playback Singer – Malayalam	Shakthisree Gopalan ("Pularikalo")	Nominated	
Vanitha Film Awards	21 February 2016	Best Actress	Parvathy Thiruvothu	Won	
Vanitha Film Awards	21 February 2016	Best Supporting Actor	Chemban Vinod Jose	Won	
Vanitha Film Awards	21 February 2016	Best Cinematography	Jomon T. John	Won	

== Reception ==
=== Box office ===
The film collected ₹2 crores on the first day from Kerala box office, and grossed ₹14.4 crores in 22 days of release. The film completed a 100-day theatrical run in Kerala and grossed ₹22.2 crores at the Kerala box office. In its lifetime, Charlie grossed ₹42 crores at the global box office.

=== Critical reception ===
Describing the film as a "tantalizing love tale", Vishnu Varma of The New Indian Express rated it 4 stars out of 5 and stated, "‘Charlie’ is a feel-good movie, but it does not stop there. It plays around brilliantly with raw emotions centered around a character who wants to be free." Litty Simon of Malayala Manorama rated it 3.25 out of 5, concluding "Dulquer's Charlie is a simple, feel good film that will make you smile this festive season. Although not an out-and-out entertainer, Charlie has the elements to be tagged as a wacky entertainer, filled with all what is needed — celebration, surprises, patience, faith, care, and above, all love!" Website Nowrunning gave the film 2.5 stars out of 5, stating "Charlie could be termed an audacious attempt but grandiose visions don't necessarily translate into well-crafted cinema. Pared down expectations could make it a reasonable weekend watch."
