= Kirill Razlogov =

Russian film critic (1946–2021)

Razlogov in 2016

Kirill Emilevich Razlogov (Russian: Кири́лл Эми́льевич Разло́гов; 6 May 1946 – 26 September 2021) was a Russian film critic and cultural anthropologist. He was the President of the Russian Guild of Film Critics from March 2015 until his death.

Razlogov was born and died in Moscow. His grandfather (on the maternal side) was Soviet diplomat Alexander Bekzadyan.

He was the director of the Russian Institute for Cultural Research (1989-2013). He was an author and the host of Cult of Cinema, a program on TV channel Russia-K. He was also the author of fourteen books and about 600 scientific papers on the history of art and cinema, different cultural issues and author of articles on the history and theory of cinema in the Great Russian Encyclopedia.

Since 1999 (with a break in 2006-2008) he worked as the program director of the Moscow International Film Festival.
