= Santhoshathinte Onnam Rahasyam =

2021 Indian Malayalam film by Don Palathara

- Directed by: Don Palathara
- Written by: Don Palathara
- Produced by: Shijo K George
- Starring: Jitin Puthenchery; Rima Kallingal
- Cinematography: Saji Babu
- Music by: Basil C J
- Production company: Bee Cave Movies
- Distributed by: Neestream et al.
- Release dates: 10 February 2021 (IFFK); 21 July 2021
- Running time: 85 minutes
- Country: India
- Language: Malayalam

Santhoshathinte Onnam Rahasyam (English: The First Joyful Mystery) is a 2021 Malayalam film directed by Don Palathara starring Jitin Puthenchery and Rima Kallingal. The film was premiered at the International Film Festival of Kerala (IFFK) in Thiruvananthapuram on 21 February 2021. This is a first of its kind experimental movie in Malayalam film industry as the entire movie is of an 85-minute single shot. The film follows a car ride taken by a young journalist (played by Rima) and an aspiring actor (played by Jitin). The film was released in Neestream and six other OTT Platforms in July 2021.

== Synopsis ==
The movie is about a live-in couple, Maria (Rima Kallingal) and Jitin (Jitin Puthenchery). Maria is an entertainment reporter. Jitin is a small-time actor, with no steady income and their parents do not have any knowledge of their relationship. The movie takes place on their way to the clinic for a pregnancy test. The couple argue as they are stressed at the thought of being pregnant. Maria feels a baby is a big responsibility that neither of them are prepared for. They bicker, point out each other's flaws and inadvertently have an honest conversation about themselves and their relationship.

== Cast ==
- Jithin Puthenchery as Jithin Babusenan
- Rima Kallingal as Maria, Jithin's Love interest
- Neeraja Rajendran as Chechi in the car

=== Voices ===
- Vedh as Vineeth
- Abin Mary as Radio Male
- Sherin Catherin as Radio Female
- Don Palathara as Director

== Soundtrack ==
The music is composed, produced and arranged by Basil C J with lyrics penned by Sherin Catherine. The song is mixed and mastered at Audiogene by Shiju Ediyatheril.

No.	Title	Lyrics	Singer(s)	Length
1.	"Pakalukal"	Sherin Catherine	Sithara Krishnakumar	3:34

== Release and reception ==
Santhoshathinte Onnam Rahasyam is one of its first kind movie in Malayalam. The camera stays in one position throughout the film and has zero cuts. The film's setting is against the backdrop of the COVID-19 pandemic. The film was shot during the pandemic in September 2020. Director Palathara who is known for auteur cinema used the settings and times to experiment with film making. Joyful Mystery released on schedule after a month-long rehearsal. Based on a script by Don Palathara the main performers Rima Kallingal and Jithin Puthenchery act in a single 85 minute narrative take captured by a dashboard camera. There was no single-take device. The director could only communicate to them from outside via headphones. The director chose one of the five takes that were captured and noted it became a tribute to the powers of collaborative film making and performance. While the performers acted they added their own dialogues to the basis of the script. The film explores the repercussions of intimate relationships that might occur without judgement or foresight. The power play of men and women is the central theme of the film framed around the secret status of live-in couple's future life revolving around motherhood. The conversation that occurs inside a car ride offers the viewers different opinions on the personalities of the two partners.

It did not have a theatrical release and was premiered on 10 February 2021 at the International Film Festival of Kerala. It generally received positive reviews from critics as well as the audience. The film is one of the selections for the main competition at the 2021 Moscow International Film Festival. It became the only Indian film to be nominated for the Golden St. George Award for that year.

Baradwaj Rangan of Film Companion South wrote "This time, we have a "plot", and characters who talk a lot. But the aesthetic is as rigorous as in the director's earlier work. The camera, for instance, is "locked in" throughout."
