= Oraalppokkam =

2014 Malayalam film

- Directed by: Sanal Kumar Sasidharan
- Written by: Sanal Kumar Sasidharan
- Produced by: Kazhcha Chalachithra Vedi
- Starring: Prakash Bare; Meena Kandasamy; Bikramjit Gupta; Venkit Ramakrishnan; Tarique Hameed
- Cinematography: Indrajith S.
- Edited by: Appu N. Bhattathiri
- Music by: Basil Joseph
- Release date: 2014
- Running time: 112 minutes
- Country: India
- Languages: Malayalam, English, Hindi and Tamil
- Budget: 26Lakhs

Oraalppokkam is a 2014 Malayalam film written and directed by Sanalkumar Sasidharan. It is the first Malayalam movie that has been produced through online crowdfunding. This is an initiative of Kazhcha Chalachithra Vedi, a film society movement based in Thiruvananthapuram. Kazhcha has a history of producing short movies with the financial contribution from film lovers. Oraalppokkam is the fourth venture of Kazhcha. It is claimed that Oraalppokkam will be copyleft after five years from the date of release.

== Synopsis ==
The storyline of the movie revolves round an honest man-woman relationship in the backdrop of a natural calamity. Mahendran and Maya are in a relationship. They have their own independent lives even while they are living as a couple. Slowly the relationship ends up in a usual pattern and Mahendran the protagonist decides to separate. Maya leaves him and disappears without revealing her whereabouts. But the separation which is more or less forced and unnatural causes imbalance in the life of Mahendran. His curiosity to know the whereabouts of Maya mounts slowly and he starts a journey in search of her. At the end of the journey he reaches the flood affected Himalayan mountain valley Kedarnath. The story develops through the people he meets on the way and his dreams.

== Cast ==
- Prakash Bare
- Meena Kandasamy
- Sonia Kohli
- Bikramjit Gupta
- Chala Chari
- Tarique Hameed
- Venkitesh Ramakrishnan
- Swami Samvidanand

== Production ==
Oraalppokkam is scripted and directed by Sanalkumar Sasidharan. This will be the debut feature film of Sanal, an independent film maker from Thiruvananthapuram. The cast including actor-producer Prakash Bare, writer Meena Kandasamy, Bengali director Bikramjit Gupta, senior journalist Venkatesh Ramakrishnan and theatre and film artiste Krishnan Balakrishnan. Indrajith S handles the cinematography and Appu N. Bhattathiri is the editor. Murugan is handling the production design. T Krishnanunni is the sound designer while Sandeep Kurissery and Jiji P Joseph are the location sound recordists. Basil Joseph is the music director and Derrick Sebastian is the executive producer of this project.

== Awards ==
2014 Kerala State Film Awards

- Best Director - Sanal Kumar Sasidharan
- Best Location Sound Recording - Sandeep Kurissery and Jiji P Joseph

Other Awards

- NETPAC award for the best Malayalam film in the 19th IFFK
- FIPRESCI award for the best Malayalam film in the 19th IFFK
- Special Jury Award for the best director in John Abraham Award 2014
- Special Jury Mention for the best debut director in the Aravindan Puraskaram 2014
