= Athisayangalude Venal =

2017 Indian Malayalam language film directed by Prasanth Vijay

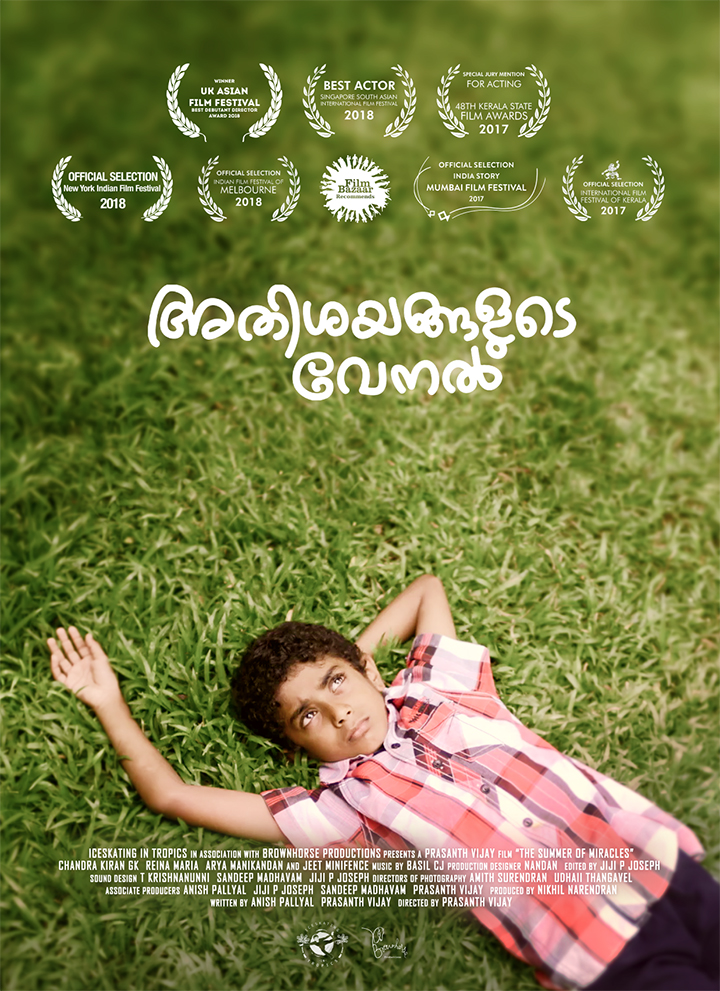
- Official poster
- Directed by: Prasanth Vijay
- Written by: Anish Pallyal, Prasanth Vijay
- Produced by: Nikhil Narendran
- Starring: Chandra Kiran GK; Reina Maria; Arya Manikandan; Jeet Minifence
- Cinematography: Amith Surendran, Udhaii Thangavel
- Edited by: Jiji P Joseph
- Music by: Basil CJ
- Production companies: Iceskating in Tropics, Brownhorse Productions
- Release date: 13 October 2017 (Mumbai Film Festival)
- Running time: 117 minutes
- Country: India
- Language: Malayalam

Athisayangalude Venal (English: The Summer of Miracles) is a 2017 Indian Malayalam-language drama film directed by debutant Prasanth Vijay. It is produced by Nikhil Narendran under the banner of Iceskating in Tropics and has Chandra Kiran GK, Reina Maria and Arya Manikandan in the lead roles. Chandra Kiran won a Special Jury Mention for his acting at the 48th Kerala State Film Awards and was declared the Best Actor of the 2018 Singapore South Asian International Film Festival. The film won the best debut award at the 2018 UK Asian Film Festival. In 2019, the film also featured in the list of 'The Best 200 Indian Films of the Decade' by Rediff.com.

The film is about a nine-year-old boy's obsession to become invisible, his relentless efforts to achieve that, and the consequences of his actions on people around him.

== Cast ==
- Chandra Kiran GK as Anand
- Reina Maria as Meera
- Arya Manikandan as Gayathri
- Jeet Minifence as Balakrishnan
- Richin Thomas as Aravind
- Rajeev Ramakrishnan as Ajaya Ghosh
- Printo as Madhu

== Reception ==
=== Critical response ===
Namrata Joshi noted in The Hindu that "the budget is negligible and the narrative minimalist while the emotional arc remains strong". Shriram Iyengar of Cinestaan.com found it "surprisingly entertaining, funny, and unique in its story". Cinestaan.com also included the film in its year-end list of '10 festival gems' of 2017. Archana Nathan, writing for Scroll.in, noted that the film "beautifully moves between imagination and reality, science and faith, and knowledge and ignorance in its quest to understand the effects of the absence of a loved one". Rasmi Binoy of The Hindu observed that the film is "a sharp detour from recurrent tropes of ‘child-centric’ cinema" further writing: "The simple, sincere narrative is essentially about how people deal with grief and tragedy, by escaping to their own fantasy worlds". In his review in Asianculturevulture.com, Sailesh Ram wrote: "intelligent and questioning, this is a film for those who like something different and unpredictable and a film that is reflectively cerebral". Aseem Chhabra picked the film among the finest 200 Indian films in the 2010-2019 decade for Rediff.com.

== Awards ==
- Best debut film - UK Asian Film Festival, London
- Best actor - Singapore South Asian International Film Festival: Chandra Kiran GK
- Kerala State Film Award – Special Mention : Chandra Kiran GK
