= 1956, Central Travancore =

- Directed by: Don Palathara
- Written by: Don Palathara
- Screenplay by: Don Palathara
- Produced by: Abhilash S. Kumar
- Starring: Assif Yogi; Jain Andrews
- Cinematography: Alex Joseph
- Edited by: Don Palathara
- Music by: Basil CJ
- Production company: Artbeat Studios
- Release date: September 2019 (Busan)
- Running time: 95 minutes
- Country: India
- Language: Malayalam

1956, Central Travancore (Malayalam: 1956) is a 2019 Indian Malayalam-language period drama film written, directed and edited by Don Palathara and produced by Abhilash S. Kumar under Artbeat studios. The film stars Assif Yogi, Jain Andrews, Krishnan Balakrishnan and Kani Kusruti in lead roles. It features a musical score by Basil CJ. Cinematography was handled by Alex Joseph. The film was completely made in black and white format.

The film is Palathara's third feature-length movie, after Savam and Vith. The film was originally titled Kattupothu (Wild Buffalo). The film is shot in black and white, like most of Palathara's films. The film made its international premier at the Busan International Film Festival, in 2019. Then at the 42nd Moscow International Film Festival, on 5 October 2020.The film made its Indian premiere at the 25th International Film Festival of Kerala. It won the 2020 John Abraham Award for Best Malayalam Film.

== Plot ==
Set in 1956, the film takes place against the backdrop of the early migration to Idukki, before Kerala's land reforms take place. The film is set in the high ranges of Central Travancore, a vast landscape then largely uninhabited by humans. The main protagonists of the story are two brothers, Kora and Onan, from Kottayam, Kerala. They set out with a group of men to hunt gaur. The film portrays their journey.

== Cast ==
- Assif Yogi as Kora
- Jain Andrews as Onan
- Krishnan Balakrishnan as Karadikkela
- Kani Kusruti as Kela's wife
- Shaun Romy as Apparition
- Balu Sreedhar as Babu
- Kenshin (credited as Aamir) as Thommi
- Muraleedharan Raveendran as Devassya
- Pradeep Kumar as Thoma
- Reju Pillai as Vijayan
- Sameen Salim as Sojan
- Kurian George as Outhakkutty
- Joseph Chilamban as Avira
- Sherin Catherine as Performer
- Jicky Paul as Performer
- Jojo Cyriac George as Doctor
- Byju Netto as Police sub inspector

== Participation in film festivals ==
In 2019, the film launched at the Busan International Film Festival in South Korea, and was also shown at the Film Bazaar Viewing Room Recommendations section, at the International Film Festival of India, held in Goa. 1956, Central Travancore also premiered at the Moscow International Film Festival in October 2020, in the non-competitive section. It is one of two Malayalam language films to be screened at the festival, the other being Biryaani, directed by Sajin Babu. The festival was postponed from April in the same year due to the worldwide COVID-19 pandemic. Due to the pandemic travel restrictions, the cast and crew will not be present at the festival, but there will a virtual interaction with the director after the screening. In an introduction to the film, Kirill Razlagov, the programming director of the festival, remarks that the film is evocative of the "deep-rooted spiritual connections between India and Russia."

== Home media ==
The film was released on streaming platform MUBI. In 2023 December, the full-length film was released in Bhavana Studio's YouTube channel.
