= Ozhivudivasathe Kali =

- Official poster
- Directed by: Sanal Kumar Sasidharan
- Screenplay by: no formal screenplay
- Based on: Ozhivudivasathe Kali by Unni R.
- Produced by: Aruna Mathew; Shaji Mathew
- Starring: Nistar Ahamed; Arun Nayar; Pradeep Kumar; Baiju Netto; Reju Pillai; Abhija Sivakala
- Cinematography: Indrajith S.
- Edited by: Appu N. Bhattathiri
- Music by: Basil C J
- Production company: Niv Art Movies
- Distributed by: Bigdream release
- Release dates: 29 October 2015 (IFFK); 17 June 2016 (Kerala)
- Running time: 106 minutes
- Country: India
- Language: Malayalam

Ozhivu Divasathe Kali (English title: An Off-Day Game) is a 2015 Indian Malayalam indie drama film directed by Sanal Kumar Sasidharan, based on the short story of the same name by Unni R. The film follows five middle-aged men who get together for a booze party during an election holiday in Kerala. It won the 46th Kerala State Film Award for Best Film. The film was included in The Hindu's top 25 Malayalam films of the decade and is widely regarded as one of the defining movies of the Malayalam New Wave.

The film was initially showcased at the festival circuits in October 2015, including the International Film Festival of Kerala and the Mumbai Film Festival. It has only 70 shots, with the second half just a single shot. Under Aashiq Abu's initiative, the film got a limited theatrical release in Kerala on 17 June 2016.

== Synopsis ==
On an election holiday, five friends get together for a booze party. The whole movie is about how they drink, make fun of each other, their fights and arguments and what they do throughout the day. Tired and bored in arguments they plan to play a game. A game they used to play in their childhood.

The five of them play find the thief game. Words "cop", "robber", "king", "minister" are written in pieces of paper chits, rolled and thrown. Each one have to pick up a paper and whoever gets the cop will have to guess the one whonis the thief. Punishment will be given to the thief if correctly identified or the cop if he fails to identify the thief.

First couple of rounds of the game go smooth, albeit unplanned. The third round takes an unexpected turn where the friends kill the one who got the thief chit. The friends in a drunken state still think its a part of their game and laugh as they leave the dead man.

== Cast ==
- Nisthar Sait as Dharman
- Baiju Netto as Dasan
- Girish Nair as Thirumeni
- Pradeep Kumar as Vinayan
- Reju R Pillai as Narayanan
- Abhija Sivakala as Geetha
- Arun Nair as Ashokan
- Sridhar P.U. as Ganeshan

== Development and production ==
The film is based on the story of well-known short story writer Unni R. The story has been successfully adopted to make political satire. There was no script while shooting the film. The film has some unique features because of this making pattern. All the dialogues are evolved due to improvisations and it contains some fine long takes. One of the lengthy shots conceived in the film is 53 minutes.

== Reception ==
=== Critical response ===
Charu Nivedita called this film, 'a miracle in Indian cinema'. Deborah Young of The Hollywood Reporter gave a positive review, saying that "The classic buddy movie is cleverly revisited with a critical eye on Indian politics and society... Sasidharan builds suspense all the way to the sickening climax." Gautaman Bhaskaran of the Hindustan Times gave a positive review. He called the film "a griping tale of corruption" and concluded by saying "An Off-Day Game, finally, is a brutal look at the way the Constitution is used for the benefit of some, at the way caste politics and colour prejudices have been wrecking our lives." After the 17the of June theatrical release, G. Ragesh of Manorama Online gave a favorable review with a 3 stars out of 5. Ragesh concluded with "Ozhivu Divasathe Kali must be watched as a political movie, but without any prejudice. It's a deliberate take on hypocrisies in the society, an entertaining trial in which you would find yourself either in the spot of the victim or the culprit."

== Awards and accolades ==
- FIPRESCI Award for the Best Malayalam film in the International Film Festival of Kerala (IFFK)
- Kerala State Film Award for Best Film - 2015
- Kerala State Film Award for Best Sound Recordist - 2015
- Official Selection in International Film Festival of Kerala IFFK2015
- Official Selection in Mumbai Academy of the Moving Image MAMI2015
- Selection in Film Bazaar Recommends, Goa
