= Shavam =

2015 film

- Film poster
- Directed by: Don Palathara
- Written by: Don Palathara
- Produced by: Anish, Molly & Shijo
- Cinematography: Prathap Joseph
- Edited by: Shanavas Naranipuzha
- Music by: Sandeep Kurissery and Jiji P Joseph
- Production company: Travancore films
- Release date: 28 November 2015
- Running time: 64 minutes
- Country: India
- Language: Malayalam
- Budget: ₹7.00 lakh (US$7,300)

Shavam: The Corpse is a 2015 Indian Malayalam-language experimental black-comedy film, written and directed by Don Palathara, in his feature directorial debut. The film was shot entirely in black-and-white. It was released on 28 November 2015.

== Background ==
Shavam is the brainchild of an Indian Australian who used to be a closely associated member of Kazcha Film Society. Don, an enthusiastic documentarian who had worked previously with Cinemavandi, re-discovered scope of art films from his international perspective. The director reveals that film aspects like the black and white picturization was to give the audience an opportunity to look at different parts of the screen at the same time, and methods such as color grading and the morbidity and lifelessness of the title was chosen for aesthetic aspects. The film's protagonist is the subject 'death' which lingers onto the body and slowly liberates the person with the final camera's upshot to heavens without complaints as a mere event. The first preview of the film was conducted by Cochin Film Society at Children's park theatre in Cochin, India. The film featured about forty actors.

== Plot ==
Shavam's plot focuses on the unexpected death of an adult in a middle-class Christian family and the funeral process in home, where neighbors, relatives and friends of the dead person are gathered. The camera movement manipulates the viewer to look through the eyes of a curious unknown who goes around the nooks and corners of the house, and whose presence is equally neglected and acknowledged. The film presents insensitivity and actual prominence of the death and its emptiness reflect in current malayali worldview.

== Reception ==
Media lists the film as an exposition of local culture in a satirical way. The ability of the director's stubbornness to clip-on its viewers to the narrative was well praised. The seminal film of the director has been an official selection to eight international film festivals and won the award for the best foreign film at Barni International Festival, Moscow.
