= Don Palathara =

Indian film director (born 1986)

- Born: Don Chacko Palathara; 22 August 1986 (age 39); Karunapuram, Kerala, India
- Occupation: Filmmaker
- Years active: 2015-present

Don Palathara (born 22 August 1986) is an Indian filmmaker from Kerala. Known for working on small budgets, his films are expositions of local Kerala culture and studies on human nature. Palathara's films have gained accolades at several international film festivals, including those of Moscow, Rotterdam and Thiruvananthapuram.

== Early life ==
Don Palathara was born in Karunapuram, Idukki district, Kerala. He subsequently migrated to Sydney, Australia, where he received a diploma from the Academy of Film, Theatre and Television in Sydney, which was formerly known as the International Film School Sydney, before its merger with Actors College of Theatre and Television.

== Career ==
Palathara had made several short films and documentaries, before venturing into feature films. In 2015, his first feature film, Shavam, was released. Made on a small budget, the film was noted for its atypical filmmaking choices, as it was made entirely in black-and-white, used location recording of sound (unusual for Indian cinema), and featured a large number of inexperienced actors. A satire exploring aspects of human character and set at a funeral, Shavam was well received in international film festivals, and garnered positive responses locally as well. For its release, it was distributed using Kazhcha Film Forum's Cinema Vandi, an alternative film distribution mechanism. Later, Shavam streamed on Netflix and Mubi.

In 2017, Palathara wrote, directed, produced, and edited his second feature, Vith. The movie was financed through crowdfunding platforms, including Kickstarter and from the proceeds of Shavam.

His next film, 1956, Central Travancore, was premiered at 2019 Moscow International Film Festival. In 2022, '1956, Central Travancore' bagged FFSI's John Abraham Award for the best film of 2020.

In 2020, Palathara made the film Santhoshathinte Onnam Rahasyam, featuring Rima Kallingal and Jitin Puthanchery, which is about an 85-min single-take car ride taken by a young journalist and an aspiring actor. This film was later nominated for Golden George for best film at the 43rd Moscow International Film Festival.

His Everything Is Cinema, a relationship drama presented in first person narrative, featuring only Sherin Catherine had its premiere at the 50th International Film Festival Rotterdam in the Cinema Regained section.

In 2023, he made Family, which stars Vinay Forrt, Divya Prabha, Nilja K Baby, Mathew Thomas, Sajitha Madathil etc. The film was an official selection at the 2023 International Film Festival Rotterdam.

In 2023, BAFTA honoured Palathara along with nine other film professionals by selecting them for the breakthrough program in India.

== Filmography ==
Year(s)	Title	Director	Producer	Editor	Writer	Reference
2015	Shavam	Yes	No	No	Yes	Debut film
2017	Vith	Yes	Yes	Yes	Yes	
2019	1956, Central Travancore	Yes	No	Yes	Yes	
2021	Everything Is Cinema	Yes	Yes	Yes	Yes	
2021	Santhoshathinte Onnam Rahasyam	Yes	No	Yes	Yes	
2023	Family	Yes	No	Yes	Yes	

== Awards ==
- John Abraham Award for Best Film by Federation of Film Societies of India in 2020
- Film Critics Award for best Screen Play by Kerala Film Critics Association Awards in 2025
- Fresh Angle and New Discoveries in Cinematography at Patriki Film Festival for Everything Is Cinema in 2021
