= 49th Kerala State Film Awards =

Annual Indian film awards ceremony

- Awarded for: Honouring achievements in Malayalam films
- Date: 27 July 2019
- Location: Thiruvananthapuram
- Country: India
- Presented by: Kerala State Chalachitra Academy
- First award: 1969

Highlights
- Most wins: Carbon (6)
- Website: http://www.keralafilm.com

The 49th Kerala State Film Awards, presented by the Kerala State Chalachitra Academy were announced by the Minister for Cultural Affairs, A. K. Balan in Thiruvananthapuram on 27 February 2019.

== Writing category ==
=== Jury ===
• P. K. Pokker (chairman)
• M. Saritha Varma	• Jinesh Kumar Eramom
• Mahesh Panju (member and secretary)

=== Awards ===
All award recipients received a cash prize, certificate and statuette.

Name of award	Title of work	Awardee(s)	Cash prize
Best Book on Cinema	Malayalacinema Pinnitta Vazhikal	M. Jayaraj	₹30,000
Best Article on Cinema	Vellithirayile 'Avarum' 'Nammalum' Thammilenthu ?	Blais Johny	₹20,000

=== Special Jury Mention ===
All recipients received a certificate and statuette.

Name of award	Title of work	Awardee(s)	Type of work
Special Mention	Kanyakayude Dhurnadappukal	N. V. Muhammad Rafi	Book
Special Mention	Malayala Cinemayum Novelum	Sunil C. E.	Article
Special Mention	Maranavum Marananantharavum Jeevanukalodu Parayunnathu	Rajesh K. Erumeli	Article

== Film category ==
=== Jury ===
• Kumar Shahani (chairman)
• K. G. Jayan	• P. J. Ignatius
• Sherry Govindan	• Vijayakrishnan
• Biju Sukumaran	• Mohandas V. P.
• George Kithu	• Navya Nair
• Mahesh Panju (member and secretary)

=== Awards ===
All award recipients receive a cash prize, certificate and statuette.

Name of award	Title of film	Awardee(s)	Cash prize
Best Film	Kanthan - The Lover of Colour	Director: Shareef C.	₹200,000
Best Film	Kanthan - The Lover of Colour	Producer: Shareef C.	₹200,000
Second Best Film	Oru Njayarazhcha	Director: Shyamaprasad	₹150,000
Second Best Film	Oru Njayarazhcha	Producer: Sarathchandran Nair	₹150,000
Best Director	Oru Njayarazhcha	Shyamaprasad	₹200,000
Best Actor	Captain; Njan Marykutty	Jayasurya	₹50,000
Best Actor	Sudani from Nigeria	Soubin Shahir	₹50,000
Best Actress	Chola; Oru Kuprasidha Payyan	Nimisha Sajayan	₹100,000
Best Character Actor	Chola; Joseph	Joju George	₹50,000
Best Character Actress	Sudani from Nigeria	Savithri Sreedharan	₹25,000
Best Character Actress	Sudani from Nigeria	Sarasa Balusserry	₹25,000
Best Child Artist	Appuvinte Sathyanweshanam	Rithun (Male category)	₹50,000
Best Child Artist	Panth	Abani Adhi (Female category)	₹50,000
Best Story	Uncle	Joy Mathew	₹50,000
Best Cinematography	Carbon	K. U. Mohanan	₹50,000
Best Screenplay	Sudani from Nigeria	Zakariya Mohammed	₹25,000
Best Screenplay	Sudani from Nigeria	Muhsin Parari	₹25,000
Best Lyrics	Theevandi ("Jeevamshamai"); Joseph ("Kannethadooram")	B. K. Harinarayanan	₹50,000
Best Music Director (song)	Carbon (All songs)	Vishal Bhardwaj	₹50,000
Best Music Director (score)	Aami	Bijibal	₹50,000
Best Male Singer	Joseph ("Poomuthole")	Vijay Yesudas	₹50,000
Best Female Singer	Aami ("Neermathalam")	Shreya Ghoshal	₹50,000
Best Editor	Oru Njayarazhcha	Aravind Manmadhan	₹50,000
Best Art Director	Kammara Sambhavam	Vineesh Banglan	₹50,000
Best Sync Sound	Carbon	Anil Radhakrishnan	₹50,000
Best Sound Mixing	Carbon	Sinoy Joseph	₹50,000
Best Sound Design	Carbon	Jayadevan C.	₹50,000
Best Processing Lab/Colourist	Carbon	Prime Focus, Mumbai	₹50,000
Best Makeup Artist	Njan Marykutty	Ronex Xavier	₹50,000
Best Costume Designer	Kammara Sambhavam	Sameera Saneesh	₹50,000
Best Dubbing Artist	Odiyan (Character: Ravunni)	Shammi Thilakan (Male category)	₹50,000
Best Dubbing Artist	Lilli (Character: Lilli)	Sneha M. (Female category)	₹50,000
Best Choreography	Aravindante Athidhikal	C. Prasanna Sujit	₹50,000
Best Film with Popular Appeal and Aesthetic Value	Sudani from Nigeria	Producer: Sameer Thahir, Shyju Khalid	₹50,000 each
Best Film with Popular Appeal and Aesthetic Value	Sudani from Nigeria	Director: Zakariya Mohammed	₹100,000
Best Debut Director	Sudani from Nigeria	Zakariya Mohammed	₹100,000
Best Children's Film	Angu Doore Oru Deshathu	Producer: Baby Mathew	₹300,000
Best Children's Film	Angu Doore Oru Deshathu	Director: Joshy Mathew	₹100,000
Special Jury Award	Pani; And the Oscar Goes To	Madhu Ambat (awarded for cinematography)	₹50,000

=== Special Jury Mention ===
All recipients receive a certificate and statuette.

Name of award	Title of film	Awardee(s)	Awarded for
Special Mention	Pani	Santhosh Mandoor	Direction
Special Mention	Chola	Sanal Kumar Sasidharan	Direction
Special Mention	Chola	Sanal Kumar Sasidharan	Sound Design
Special Mention	Roudram 2018	K. P. A. C. Leela	Acting
