= List of Disney+ Hotstar original films =

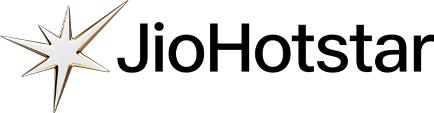

This article is a list of streaming television films which released on JioHotstar, or just Hotstar, an Indian subscription video on-demand over-the-top streaming service owned and operated by JioStar. a Joint Venture between Disney India, Reliance Industries and the latter's Subsidiary Viacom18. It was launched in February 2015 as Star India Hotstar, later renamed as Disney+ Hotstar in April 2020 and as JioHotstar in February 2025.

== Indian original films ==
=== Disney+ Hotstar Multiplex ===
Also dubbed as Hotstar Premiere Nights where the service operated only as Hotstar. The below titles are exclusively streaming on the platform forgoing their theatrical releases.

Title	Premiere	Genre	Length	Language(s)	Ref(s).
Dil Bechara	24 July 2020	Coming-of-age romantic drama	102 mins	Hindi	
Lootcase	31 July 2020	Comedy thriller	132 mins	Hindi	
Khuda Haafiz	14 August 2020	Action thriller	133 mins	Hindi	
Sadak 2	28 August 2020	Action thriller	134 mins	Hindi	
Laxmii	9 November 2020	Comedy horror	141 mins	Hindi	
Mookuthi Amman	14 November 2020	Fantasy comedy	134 mins	Tamil	
Bhoomi	14 January 2021	Action drama	127 mins	Tamil	
Teddy	12 March 2021	Action thriller	134 mins	Tamil	
The Big Bull	8 April 2021	Financial thriller	153 mins	Hindi	
Paramapadham Vilayattu	14 April 2021	Political thriller	132 mins	Tamil	
Hum Bhi Akele Tum Bhi Akele	9 May 2021	Romantic comedy	117 mins	Hindi	
Shaadisthan	11 June 2021	Musical drama	93 mins	Hindi	
Collar Bomb	9 July 2021	Thriller	86 mins	Hindi	
Hungama 2	23 July 2021	Romantic comedy	156 mins	Hindi	
Bhuj: The Pride of India	13 August 2021	Historical war film	113 mins	Hindi	
Netrikann	13 August 2021	Crime thriller	144 mins	Tamil	
Bhoot Police	10 September 2021	Comedy horror	129 mins	Hindi	
Annabelle Sethupathi	17 September 2021	Comedy horror	135 mins	Tamil	
Maestro	17 September 2021	Black comedy crime thriller	135 mins	Telugu	
Shiddat	1 October 2021	Romantic drama	146 mins	Hindi	
Lift	1 October 2021	Horror thriller	135 mins	Tamil	
Sanak	15 October 2021	Action thriller	117 mins	Hindi	
Oh Manapenne!	22 October 2021	Romantic comedy	140 mins	Tamil	
Hum Do Hamare Do	29 October 2021	Comedy drama	129 mins	Hindi	
MGR Magan	4 November 2021	Masala	141 mins	Tamil	
Kanakam Kaamini Kalaham	12 November 2021	Comedy drama	121 mins	Malayalam	
Adbhutham	19 November 2021	Science fiction romantic drama	142 mins	Telugu	
Cash	19 November 2021	Comedy drama	119 mins	Hindi	
Pon Manickavel	19 November 2021	Action thriller	133 mins	Tamil	
Maa Oori Polimera	10 December 2021	Thriller	98 mins	Telugu	
Atrangi Re	24 December 2021	Romantic drama/Musical	137 mins	Hindi	
Keshu Ee Veedinte Nadhan	31 December 2021	Comedy drama	142 mins	Malayalam	
Anbarivu	7 January 2022	Family drama	165 mins	Tamil	
Bro Daddy	26 January 2022	Comedy drama	159 mins	Malayalam	
A Thursday	17 February 2022	Thriller	129 mins	Hindi	
Maaran	11 March 2022	Action thriller	130 mins	Tamil	
Lalitham Sundaram	18 March 2022	Comedy drama	120 mins	Malayalam	
Kaun Pravin Tambe?	1 April 2022	Biographical drama	134 mins	Hindi	
Taanakkaran	8 April 2022	Action drama	143 mins	Tamil	
12th Man	20 May 2022	Mystery thriller	163 mins	Malayalam	
O2	17 June 2022	Survival thriller	140 mins	Tamil	
19(1)(a)	29 July 2022	Drama	107 mins	Malayalam	
Good Luck Jerry	29 July 2022	Dark crime comedy	118 mins	Hindi	
Vattam	29 July 2022	Action thriller	116 mins	Tamil	
Cuttputlli	2 September 2022	Thriller	134 mins	Hindi	
Babli Bouncer	23 September 2022	Comedy	118 mins	Hindi	
Repeat	1 December 2022	Thriller	124 mins	Telugu	
Freddy	2 December 2022	Romantic thriller	124 mins	Hindi	
Jagamemaya	15 December 2022	Mystery drama	111 mins	Telugu	
Govinda Naam Mera	16 December 2022	Comedy	131 mins	Hindi	
Rabia & Olivia	24 February 2023	Drama	124 mins	Hindi	
Gulmohar	3 March 2023	Drama	131 mins	Hindi	
Gaslight	31 March 2023	Thriller	111 mins	Hindi	
Tumse Na Ho Payega	29 September 2023	Comedy	132 mins	Hindi	
Apurva	15 November 2023	Crime thriller	95 mins	Hindi	
Patna Shuklla	29 March 2024	Legal drama	125 mins	Hindi	
Bloody Ishq	26 July 2024	Horror thriller	138 mins	Hindi	
Vaazhai	23 August 2024	Children's drama	136 mins	Tamil	
Sweet Dreams	24 January 2025	Romantic drama	107 mins	Hindi	
The Storyteller	28 January 2025	Drama	112 mins	Hindi	
Dil Dosti Aur Dogs	28 February 2025	Drama	101 mins	Hindi	
Sarzameen	25 July 2025	Action Spy drama	137 mins	Hindi	
Paranthu Po	4 July 2025	Road musical comedy	140 mins	Tamil	

=== Hotstar Specials ===
Hotstar Specials is a brand of JioHotstar on which the platform releases their original films done exclusively for the service.

Title	Premiere	Genre	Length	Language(s)
Chappad Phaad Ke	18 October 2019	Comedy thriller	121 mins	Hindi
Kanpuriye	25 October 2019	anthology film	102 mins	Hindi
Bahut Hua Samman	2 October 2020	Comedy thriller	125 mins	Hindi
Lucky The Superstar	20 February 2026	Children's comedy drama	122 mins	Tamil
Kenatha Kanom	13 March 2026	Comedy drama	116 mins	Tamil

==== Documentary ====
Title	Premiere	Genre	Length	Language(s)
1232 KMS	24 March 2021	Documentary film	86 mins	Hindi

=== Others ===
Title	Premiere	Genre	Length	Language(s)
Dheet Pathangey	2 March 2020	Comedy drama	114 min.	Hindi

== Southeast Asian original films ==
JioHotstar also carries Southeast Asian original films that commissioned exclusively in their respective regions. The following Indonesian and Malaysian films were premiered direct-to-streaming under the Hotstar Originals banner due to COVID-19-related cinema closures. New local films premiered every Friday in Indonesia, with the exclusion of Sabar Ini Ujian (Sabar, It's a Test) as Indonesian launch title, along with TV series premiered at the same day, in absence of latest Indonesian films release, such as Si Juki Anak Kosan. Disney+ Hotstar was originally teased with 7 new Indonesian films, but was later expanded to more than 13 local films. Malaysian release will also get their local films premiered as well. Some Indonesian and Malaysian films will be available to stream elsewhere (including global streaming platform such as Netflix, Amazon Prime Video, Apple TV, Catchplay+, Viu, WeTV/iflix and iQIYI; along with regional streaming platform such as Vision+, Vidio, CubMu, Mola and KlikFilm) after their first-run releases.

=== Indonesian original films ===
Title	Genre	Premiere	Runtime	Exclusive region(s)
Sabar, It's a Test	Romantic dramedy	5 September 2020 (Note: Indonesia); 16 July 2021 (Note: Thailand); 6 August 2021 (Note: Malaysia)	126 min.	Indonesia, Malaysia, Thailand
Chronicle Scope	Coming-of-age biographical drama	11 September 2020; 20 August 2021	98 min.	Indonesia, Malaysia, Thailand
Benyamin Biang Kerok 2	Comedy drama	18 September 2020; 6 August 2021	97 min.	Indonesia, Malaysia, Thailand
Warkop DKI Reborn 4	Action comedy	25 September 2020	103 min.	Indonesia and Malaysia
Bidadari Mencari Sayap	Melodrama	2 October 2020	90 min.	Indonesia and Malaysia
Malik & Elsa	Teen romantic drama	9 October 2020; 30 July 2021	87 min.	Indonesia, Thailand, Malaysia
Ghost Painter	Horror dramedy	16 October 2020	98 min.	Indonesia
A Million Love	Family drama	23 October 2020; 23 July 2021; 3 September 2021	97 min.	Indonesia, Thailand, Malaysia
Clink of Death	Teen supernatural horror	30 October 2020	85 min.	Indonesia
The Irreplaceable	Coming-of-age adventure	6 November 2020	100 min.	Indonesia and Malaysia
Under the Age	Teen romantic drama	13 November 2020	91 min.	Indonesia and Malaysia
Once Upon a Time in Indonesia	Action drama	20 November 2020	158 min.	Indonesia and Malaysia
Irreplaceable	Family melodrama	15 January 2021	104 min.	Indonesia and Malaysia
Incredible Love	Family drama	22 January 2021	105 min.	Indonesia and Malaysia
World Agent	Family dramedy	5 February 2021	77 min.	Indonesia and Malaysia
#StopOnYou	Coming-of-age romantic drama	12 February 2021	100 min.	Indonesia and Malaysia
The Cocoon Of Friendship	Teen dramedy	26 February 2021	94 min.	Indonesia and Malaysia
The Secret 2: Mystery of Villa 666	Coming-of-age supernatural horror	5 March 2021	71 min.	Indonesia and Malaysia
Ghostbuser	Horror comedy	9 April 2021	95 min.	Indonesia and Malaysia
Surga yang Tak Dirindukan 3	Romantic melodrama	16 April 2021; 27 August 2021	124 min.	Indonesia and Malaysia
Adit Sopo Jarwo the Movie	Animated comedy-drama	30 April 2021	92 min.	Indonesia and Malaysia
Wedding Proposal	Romantic dramedy	7 May 2021	102 min.	Indonesia
Till Death Do Us Part	Romantic comedy thriller	28 May 2021	91 min.	Indonesia
Devil On Top	Workplace comedy	25 June 2021	106 min.	Indonesia
Ghibah	Supernatural horror	30 July 2021	98 min.	Indonesia
Notebook	Romantic melodrama	27 August 2021	82 min.	Indonesia
The Watcher	Romantic thriller	24 September 2021	89 min.	Indonesia

=== Malaysian original films ===
Title	Genre	Premiere	Runtime	Exclusive region(s)
J2: J Retribusi	Action drama	1 June 2021; 2 July 2021	108 min.	Malaysia and Indonesia
Zombitopia	Zombie apocalypse	2 July 2021; 9 July 2021; 6 August 2021	89 min.	Malaysia, Thailand, Indonesia
Ada Hantu	Horror comedy	13 August 2021; 29 October 2021	100 min.	Malaysia and Indonesia

== Disney+ Originals ==

These are commissioned by Disney+ and are exclusively available on Disney+ Hotstar in India and selected Southeast Asian countries as Disney+ is fully integrated with the service.

Title	Genre	Premiere	Runtime	Language(s)	Exclusive region(s)
The Rescue	Documentary	3 December 2021 (Note: India); 25 March 2022 (Note: Indonesia, Malaysia and Thailand)	114 min.	English	All markets
BTS: Permission to Dance on Stage – LA	Concert film	8 September 2022	130 min.	Korean	All markets

== Exclusive distributions ==
=== Exclusive international distribution ===
The following titles are the general films that distributed by Disney subsidiaries (known as Walt Disney Studios), including film releases from Hulu, Star, Star+, Walt Disney Pictures, 20th Century Studios, 20th Century Animation and Searchlight Pictures for streaming exclusively on the platform. (Note: Applies for Disney+ Hotstar subscription only.) Films labelled with a † symbol signifies a film that exclusively released on the platform forgoing theatrical and/or Disney+ Premier Access releases.

==== Feature Films ====
Title	Genre	Premiere	Runtime	Exclusive region(s)
Mulan †	Fantasy action drama	4 December 2020	115 min	India and Indonesia
Nomadland	Drama	30 April 2021	108 min	All markets (Note: India, Indonesia, Malaysia, and Thailand)
Raya and the Last Dragon †	Animated fantasy action-adventure	4 June 2021	107 min	Indonesia and Malaysia
Cruella †	Crime comedy	27 August 2021; 3 September 2021 (Note: Malaysia and Thailand); 5 September 2021	134 min	All markets
Vacation Friends	Comedy	27 August 2021; 3 September 2021	103 min	All markets
Black Widow †	Superhero film	3 September 2021	134 min	India
The Eyes of Tammy Faye	Biographical drama	1 December 2021; 8 December 2021; 22 December 2021	126 min	All markets
Antlers	Supernatural horror	15 December 2021; 24 December 2021	99 min	Selected territories
Fresh	Romantic comedy thriller	15 April 2022; 10 June 2022	114 min	All markets
No Exit	Suspense thriller	15 April 2022; 6 May 2022	95 min	All markets
Sex Appeal	Teen romantic comedy	27 May 2022; 2022	90 min	All markets
The Valet	Romantic comedy	24 June 2022	123 min	All markets
Crush	Romantic comedy	24 June 2022; 22 July 2022 (Note: Indonesia and Malaysia); 2022	92 min	All markets
Fire Island	Romantic comedy	24 June 2022	105 min	India and Thailand
The Princess (Note: Unavailable)	Dark fantasy action thriller	2 July 2022; 29 July 2022	94 min	All markets
The Bob's Burgers Movie	Animated musical comedy	13 July 2022	102 min	All markets
Lightyear †	Animated action-adventure	3 August 2022	100 min	Indonesia and Malaysia
Not Okay	Dark comedy	5 August 2022; 12 August 2022	106 min	All markets
Prey	Science fiction action thriller	5 August 2022; 7 October 2022	99 min	All markets
Thor: Love and Thunder †	Superhero action comedy	8 September 2022	119 min	Malaysia
Rosaline	Period romantic comedy	14 October 2022; 21 October 2022	97 min	All markets
Grimcutty	Horror	21 October 2022; 28 October 2022	101 min	All markets
Matriarch	Horror	21 October 2022; 28 October 2022	95 min	India and Thailand
Barbarian	Horror	26 October 2022	107 min	All markets
Strange World †	Animated science fiction action-adventure	23 December 2022	102 min	Indonesia and Malaysia
Darby and the Dead	Supernatural teen comedy	10 October 2022	100 min	Southeast Asia
Boston Strangler	Crime drama	17 March 2023	112 min	All markets
Rye Lane	Romance comedy	31 March 2023	83 min	All markets
Quasi	Period comedy	20 April 2023	100 min	All markets
White Men Can't Jump	Sports comedy	19 May 2023	102 min	All markets
Flamin' Hot	Biographical comedy drama	9 June 2023	98 min	All markets
Miguel Wants to Fight	Coming-of-age comedy	16 August 2023	75 min	All markets
Vacation Friends 2	Comedy	25 August 2023	105 min	All markets
No One Will Save You	Science fiction horror	22 September 2023	93 min	All markets
The Mill	Science fiction thriller	9 October 2023	106 min	All markets
Quiz Lady	Comedy	3 November 2023	88 min	All markets
Prom Dates	Coming-of-age comedy drama	3 May 2024	85 min	All markets
All of Us Strangers †	Romantic drama	10 May 2024	105 min	Indonesia and Malaysia
The Parenting	Comedy horror	14 March 2025	94 min	India
Control Freak	Horror	20 March 2025	1 h 44 min	India
O'Dessa	Post-apocalyptic musical drama	20 March 2025	1 h 46 min	India

==== Documentaries ====
Title	Genre	Premiere	Runtime	Exclusive region(s)
Summer of Soul	Concert film	30 July 2021; 11 February 2022	117 min	All markets
Machine Gun Kelly's Life in Pink	Music	1 July 2022; 14 September 2022	101 min	All markets
Leave No Trace	True crime	16 September 2022	110 min	All markets
Aftershock	American history	30 September 2022	1 h 27 min	All markets
God Forbid: The Sex Scandal That Brought Down a Dynasty	True crime	9 November 2022	109 min	All markets
The Housewife & the Shah Shocker	True crime	2 December 2022	48 min	All markets
Finding Michael	Search and rescue/Biopic	17 March 2023	100 min	Southeast Asia
Queenmaker: The Making of an It Girl	True crime	7 June 2023	87 min	All markets
Anthem	American history	28 June 2023	99 min	All markets
The Randall Scandal: Love, Loathing, and Vanderpump	True crime	4 August 2023	84 min	All markets
Trap Jazz	Music	27 October 2023	84 min	All markets
The Lady Bird Diaries	Biopic	13 November 2023	100 min	All markets
Shohei Ohtani – Beyond the Dream	Sports	17 November 2023	99 min	All markets
Aaron Carter: The Little Prince of Pop	Music	27 December 2023	56 min	All markets
Memes & Nightmares	Documentary	14 March 2025	1 h 21 min	India
Last Take: Rust and the Story of Halyna	Documentary	14 March 2025	1 h 30 min	India

==== Non-English language ====
===== French =====
Title	Genre	Premiere	Runtime	Exclusive region(s)
A Place to Fight For	Romantic thriller	7 July 2023	94 min	All markets
Antigang: La Relève	Action thriller	25 August 2023	90 min	Southeast Asia

===== Japanese =====
Title	Genre	Premiere	Runtime	Exclusive region(s)
Disney My Music Story: Yoshiki	Music documentary special	30 June 2021	47 min	Thailand
Disney My Music Story: Perfume	Music documentary special	30 June 2021	53 min	Thailand

===== Korean =====
Title	Genre	Premiere	Runtime	Exclusive region(s)
PSY Summer Swag 2022	Concert film	3 May 2023	86 min	All markets

===== Turkish =====
Title	Genre	Premiere	Runtime	Exclusive region(s)
The Nightingale of Bursa	Musical comedy	10 March 2023	120 min	Southeast Asia
My Apologies	Comedy	14 April 2023	110 min	Southeast Asia

=== Exclusive third-party distribution ===
These titles are being bought by Disney due to distribution rights for streaming exclusively on the platform.

Title	Genre	Premiere	Runtime	Language(s)	Exclusive region(s)
Blackpink: The Movie	Documentary	15 December 2021; TBA	96 min.	Korean	All markets
Wife of a Spy	Historical romantic drama	25 July 2022	116 min.	Japanese	Southeast Asia
Minxiong Haunted House	Horror drama	19 November 2022	79 min.	Taiwanese Mandarin	Southeast Asia
Mama Boy	Romantic comedy drama	26 November 2022	98 min.	Taiwanese Mandarin	Southeast Asia
