= Rajshri Deshpande =

Indian actress

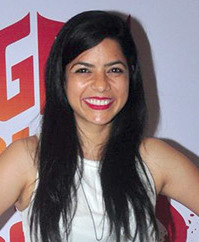
- Deshpande in 2015
- Born: Aurangabad, Maharashtra, India
- Occupation: Actress
- Years active: 2011–present

Rajshri Deshpande is an Indian actress. She gained international recognition for her performance in Pan Nalin's drama film Angry Indian Goddesses. She then portrayed the title character in Sanal Kumar Sasidharan's Sexy Durga and received critical acclaim for her performance in the Netflix series Sacred Games. In 2023, Deshpande won Best Actress in a Drama Series at the 2023 Filmfare OTT Awards, for her work in Trial by Fire.

== Early life ==
Rajshri Deshpande was born in a working-class family in Aurangabad, Maharashtra. She is the youngest of three siblings. She has an undergraduate degree in law from Symbiosis Law School and a postgraduate degree in advertising from Symbiosis International University. She got into the advertising industry to support herself but soon found her calling in acting. She also has a diploma in filmmaking from Whistling Woods International in Mumbai.

== Career ==
Deshpande made her Bollywood debut in 2012 with a small role in the Aamir Khan starrer Talaash. She then moved to television and appeared in Kuch Toh Log Kahenge and 24: India, in 2013. She subsequently returned to the big screen with a small role in Salman Khan's Kick. She also appeared in the Malayalam film Haram in 2015, where she had a double role. In Hindi cinema, it was the portrayal of Laxami in Pan Nalin's Angry Indian Goddesses that provided her with a bigger platform. The film received the 1st Runner Up – People's Choice Award at the Toronto International Film Festival and the People's Choice Award at the Rome Film Festival. Deshpande played the leading role in Sanal Kumar Sasidharan's film Sexy Durga in 2017, which won the Tiger Award at the Rotterdam Film Festival.

Deshpande made her digital debut with BBC One's McMafia, directed by James Watkins, in January 2018. She was also seen in the Netflix show Sacred Games, directed by Anurag Kashyap. In it, she played the character of Subhadra and was praised for her role as the wife of Nawazuddin Siddiqui's character. A scandal arose when she was accused of being a porn star by some viewers, as the show included a nude sex scene. The actress replied that she hadn't done anything wrong. She later portrayed Ismat Chughtai in Nandita Das's Manto.

In 2025, Deshpande won the Filmfare Critics Award for Best Actress – Marathi for her performance in Satyashodhak.

== Filmography ==
=== Film ===
List of film appearances, with year, title, and role shown
| Year | Title | Role | Language | Notes | Ref |
|---|---|---|---|---|---|
| 2012 | Talaash | Priya | Hindi | | |
| 2014 | Kick | Mrs. Sharma | Hindi | | |
| 2015 | Haram | Ameena | Malayalam | | |
| 2015 | Angry Indian Goddesses | Laxmi | Hindi | | |
| 2016 | Eli Eli Lama Sabachthani | Ganga | Marathi; Hindi; English | Trilingual film | |
| 2016 | Mumbai Central | Gauri | Hindi | | |
| 2017 | Sexy Durga | Durga | Malayalam | | |
| 2017 | Mom | DK's wife | Hindi | | |
| 2018 | Manto | Ismat Chughtai | Hindi; Urdu | Bilingual film | |
| 2019 | Nirvana Inn | Mohini | Hindi | | |
| 2019 | The Sky Is Pink | Anita Tandon | Hindi | | |
| 2019 | Kanpuriye | Kohinoor | Hindi | | |
| 2020 | Choked | Neeta | Hindi | | |
| 2021 | Collar Bomb | Rita | Hindi | | |
| 2022 | Mann Kasturi Re | Siddhant's lawyer | Marathi | | |
| 2023 | Joram | Mukta | Hindi | | |
| 2024 | Satyashodhak | Savitribai Phule | Marathi | | |
| 2024 | Chote Nawab | Asgari | Hindi | | |
| 2025 | Thug Life | Kanika | Tamil | Cameo | |
| 2026 | Spa | Lisa, the Bikini Killer | Malayalam | Cameo | |
| 2026 | Baapya | Shailaja/Shailesh | Marathi | | |

=== Television ===
List of film appearances, with year, title, and role shown
| Year | Title | Role | Notes | Ref |
|---|---|---|---|---|
| 2012–13 | Kuch to Log Kahenge | Suhasini | | |
| 2013 | 24 | Agent Veena | | |
| 2018 | McMafia | Manju | British television series | |
| 2018 | Sacred Games | Subhadra | Netflix series | |
| 2019 | Parchhayee | Vaishali | ZEE5 series | |
| 2022 | The Fame Game | Shobha Trivedi | Netflix series | |
| 2023 | Trial by Fire | Neelam Krishnamoorthy | Netflix series | |
| 2025 | Black Warrant | Pratibha Sen | Netflix series | |
| 2025 | Rangeen | Naina Johri | Amazon Prime series | |
