= Prathap Joseph =

Indian Cinematographer and Film Director

- Occupations: Journalist; Cinematographer; Film Director
- Years active: 2010–present
- Notable work: Sexy Durga; CR No: 89; Savam; Eli Eli Lama Sabachthani; Oru Rathri Oru Pakal

Prathap Joseph is an Indian journalist, cinematographer and filmmaker.

== Career ==
He belongs to new-age indie filmmakers from Kerala. Active in filmmaking since 2010, he has conducted workshops in cinematography and filmmaking at the K. R. Narayanan National Institute of Visual Science and Arts, the National Institute of Technology Calicut and at Thunchath Ezhuthachan Malayalam University. He is also the founder of the Light Source Photographic Society and the Minimal Cinema film commune, and a director of the New Wave Film School.

Oru Rathri Oru Pakal (A day, a night), a Malayalam film written, cinematographed, and directed by Prathap Joseph, had its Indian premiere in Dec 2019 at the 3rd edition of the Kazhcha-Niv Independent Film Festival (KNIFF). Oru Rathri Oru Pakal was nominated for Pune International Film Festival. In January 2020, the film took a 'non-theatrical distribution' route, releasing at the Open Screen.

== Filmography ==
As cinematographer

Year	Title	Director
2013	CR No: 89	Sudevan
2015	Savam	Don Palathara
2017	Eli Eli Lama Sabachthani? (film)	Jiju Antony
2017	Sexy Durga	Sanal Kumar Sasidharan
2017	Akatho Puratho	Sudevan
2019	Unmadhiyude Maranam	Sanal Kumar Sasidharan

As film director

Year	Title	Festivals participated
2014	Kuttippuram Palam	
2016	With Her	
2017	When Two Kiss	
2019	Oru Rathri Oru Pakal	1st Independent Film Festival of Chennai | Feb 2020 — Tamil Nadu; 15th Thrissur International Film Festival | Mar 2020 — Kerala; Indian Film Festival of Melbourne | Oct 2020 — Australia

== Awards ==
- Best Cinematographer – Tarkovsky International Film Festival, Russia [Zerkalo]
