= Kayattam =

2020 Malayalam film by Sanal Kumar Sasidharan

- Directed by: Sanal Kumar Sasidharan
- Written by: Sanal Kumar Sasidharan
- Produced by: Shaji Mathew; Aruna Mathew
- Starring: Manju Warrier; Gourav Raveendran; Vedh; Sujith Koyikkal; Bhupendra Khurana
- Cinematography: Chandru Selvaraj
- Edited by: Sanal Kumar Sasidharan
- Music by: Ratheesh Eeetillam
- Production company: NIV Productions
- Release dates: October 2020 (Busan); 23 January 2025
- Running time: 105 minutes
- Country: India
- Language: Malayalam

Kayattam (transl. Climb) also known as A'hr, is a 2020 Indian Malayalam-language film written, directed and edited by Sanal Kumar Sasidharan, starring Manju Warrier in the lead role. The film is produced by Shaji Mathew and Aruna Mathew under NIV Productions banner.

The film was premiered at the 25th Busan International Film Festival and then at the Indian Film Festival of Melbourne. Sanal Kumar gave the film a free online release, by sharing the film's Google Drive link on 23 January 2025.

== Cast ==
- Manju Warrier as Maya
- Gourav Raveendran
- Vedh
- Sujith Koyikkal
- Bhupendra Khurana

== Production ==
After Chola (2019), Sanal Kumar Sasidharan was announced to join hands with Manju Warrier for their next project, based on mountaineering. The film is produced by Shaji Mathew and Aruna Mathew under NIV Productions banner. Co-produced by Manju Warrier in her production debut, the film was shot in places around Himachal Pradesh and the got warpped by the end of October 2019. During the filming in Himachal, it was reported that the crew and cast got trapped in a remote village that was 330 kilometers away from Shimla due to the Himachal floods. After getting stranded there for a week, the team was safely shifted to Manali. Apart from writing and direction, the editing and sound design were also handled by the director Sanal Kumar himself. During an interview in May 2020, Sanal Kumar revealed that the post-production works were completed and is in the processes related to censor.

== Soundtrack ==
The songs in the film are in a fictional language called A'hr.

== Release ==
In January 2025, Sanal Kumar disclosed his idea of releasing the film online for free, similar to his previous release, Vazhakku (2022). On 23 January 2025, Sanal Kumar shared the link of his Google Drive to access the film, along with the link for the English subtitles.

=== Premiere ===
Kayattam was premiered at the 25th Busan International Film Festival scheduled between 21 and 30 October 2020 and then at the Indian Film Festival of Melbourne in 2021.

=== Reception ===
Baradwaj Rangan of Film Companion wrote, "This is Sanal's most woman-centric film, and it's also his gentlest. Usually, the women in his films are preyed upon. But here, Maya is the predator" and added that "even in his experimental mode, he [Sanal] is fascinating".

== Accolades ==
Award	Date of ceremony	Category	Nominee(s)	Result	Ref.
2020	Busan International Film Festival	Kim Jiseok Award	Sanal Kumar Sasidharan	Nominated	
2021	Indian Film Festival of Melbourne	Disruptor in Cinema	Sanal Kumar Sasidharan	Won	

== Controversy ==
Following a complaint lodged by Manju Warrier at the Elamakkara Police station, Kochi, Sanal Kumar was arrested at Parassala, Thiruvananthapuram for trying to blackmail, defame her and alleging on social media claiming that Manju's life is in danger. It was also reported that Sanal Kumar was stalking the actress, during the shoot of the film, which started after a dispute with Manju Warrier's manager. Soon after getting bail, Sanal disclosed that he had confessed his love to the actress.
