= Intkhedi Sadak =

Intkhedi Sadak Eint Khedi
- village
- Location within Madhya Pradesh Location within India
- Coordinates: 23.3648091°N 77.3970354°E
- Country: India
- State: Madhya Pradesh
- District: Bhopal
- Tehsil: Huzur
- Elevation: 487 m (1,598 ft)

Population (2011)
  - Total: 2,447
- Time zone: UTC+5:30 (IST)
- ISO 3166 code: MP-IN
- 2011 census code: 482367

Intkhedi Sadak is a village in the Bhopal district of Madhya Pradesh, India. It is located in the Huzur tehsil and the Phanda block.

Intkhedi is one among four villages of erstwhile Bhopal State were 173 Malayali families from Travancore–Cochin state was rehabilitated as part of Second Nehru ministry's Central Mechanised Farming Project in 1955. The other three such settlements are villages of Imillia, Urdumao and Majoos Kalan in Raisen district. These people were brought for promotion of Tapioca and Paddy cultivation but the project was prematurely abandoned in 1956 after formation of Madhya Pradesh state.

== Demographics ==
According to the 2011 census of India, Intkhedi Sadak has 500 households. The effective literacy rate (i.e. the literacy rate of population excluding children aged 6 and below) is 62.53%. The major spoken language of village is Hindi. However there is a significant number of Malayalam language speakers who reside in the village.

Demographics (2011 Census)
	Total	Male	Female
Population	2447	1226	1221
Children aged below 6 years	416	216	200
Scheduled caste	396	200	196
Scheduled tribe	184	97	87
Literates	1270	689	581
Workers (all)	961	632	329
Main workers (total)	770	518	252
Main workers: Cultivators	49	26	23
Main workers: Agricultural labourers	396	273	123
Main workers: Household industry workers	14	7	7
Main workers: Other	311	212	99
Marginal workers (total)	191	114	77
Marginal workers: Cultivators	9	5	4
Marginal workers: Agricultural labourers	160	97	63
Marginal workers: Household industry workers	0	0	0
Marginal workers: Others	22	12	10
Non-workers	1486	594	892

== See also ==
- Daya Bai
- Dandakaranya Project
