= Chandru Selvaraj =

Indian cinematographer

- Born: Ooty, Tamil Nadu, India
- Occupation: Cinematographer
- Years active: 2020–present
- Notable work: Kayattam (2020); Vazhakku (2022); Marco (2024)
- Awards: Kerala State Film Award for Best Cinematography (2020, 2022)

Chandru Selvaraj is an Indian cinematographer who works in the Malayalam film industry. He has received two Kerala State Film Awards for Best Cinematography for his acclaimed work in Kayattam (2020) and Vazhakku (2022).

== Early life ==
Chandru was born in Ooty, Tamil Nadu. His father's job required frequent transfers, which eventually led his family to settle in Chennai. Initially, Chandru pursued a career in engineering because of the suggestions from his family. However, he made the bold decision to take up filmmaking despite initial objections from his family.

== Career ==
He started his career by assisting cinematographer Tirru. He has assisted on seven films in a span of four years, during which he was introduced to Sanal Kumar Sasidharan by an associate of Karthik Subbaraj while they were working on Petta (2019).

In 2021, Chandru won the Kerala State Film Award for Best Cinematography for his work in Kayattam (2020), which was his feature debut film. The film was entirely shot on an iPhone XS Max in the Himalayas.

In 2022, he worked on Mahaveeryar, directed by Abrid Shine and starring Asif Ali and Nivin Pauly in the lead roles. He won the Kerala State Film Award for Best Cinematography, again, for his acclaimed work in the film. His collaboration with Sanal Kumar Sasidharan on Kayattam was a significant turning point in his career as he got to work with him again in 2022, in Vazhakku.

== Filmography ==
=== As cinematographer ===
Key
†	Denotes films that have not yet been released

- All films in Malayalam unless otherwise noted

Year	Film	Notes	Ref.
2020	Kayattam	Kerala State Film Award for Best Cinematography	
2022	Mahaveeryar		
2022	Vazhakku	Kerala State Film Award for Best Cinematography	
2023	Madhura Manohara Moham		
2024	Jai Ganesh		
2024	Her		
2024	Marco		
2026	Prathichaya		
2026	Kattalan	Additional cinematography	

== Awards ==
- 51st Kerala State Film Award for Best Cinematography - Kayattam (2020)
- 53rd Kerala State Film Award for Best Cinematography - Vazhakku
