= Sheetal Thakur =

Indian actress (born 1991)

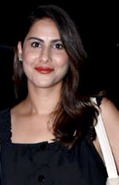
- Thakur in 2022
- Born: 12 November 1991 (age 34); Dharamshala, Himachal Pradesh
- Education: Baddi University, Baddi, Himachal Pradesh
- Occupations: Actress; model
- Years active: 2016–present
- Spouse: Vikrant Massey (m. 2021)
- Children: 1 (Son)

Sheetal Massey (née Thakur; born 12 November 1991) and known professionally as Sheetal Thakur is an Indian actress who primarily works in Hindi films and streaming television shows. She made her acting debut with the Punjabi film Bambukat in 2016, for which she received Filmfare Awards Punjabi Best Supporting Actress nomination. She made her Hindi film debut with Brij Mohan Amar Rahe in 2018. Thakur is known for her role in the films Chappad Phaad Ke, Shukranu and the web series Broken But Beautiful.

== Early life ==
Thakur was born to the Hindu family in Dharamshala, originally from Shahtalai, Bilaspur district, Himachal Pradesh. She completed her Engineering from Baddi University in Mechanical Engineering. She participated in Femina Miss Himachal Pradesh during her college days and won 'Miss Beautiful Smile' title.

== Personal life ==
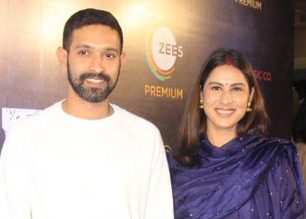
Thakur with husband Vikrant Massey in 2022

Thakur and Vikrant Massey began dating in 2015, before they together starred in Broken But Beautiful. They got engaged in November 2019. They registered their marriage on 14 February 2022 in an intimate ceremony at their Versova home. On 18 February 2022, Thakur and Massey got married in a traditional ceremony in Himachal Pradesh. They have one child.

== Career ==
Thakur made her acting debut in 2016 with the Punjabi film Bambukat, for which she received Filmfare Awards Punjabi Best Supporting Actress nomination. In 2017, she appeared in the short film Dark Brew alongside Vinay Pathak.

Thakur made her Hindi film debut in 2018 with Brij Mohan Amar Rahe opposite Arjun Mathur which released on Netflix. The same year she made her web debut with Viu's Banned and appeared in Season 1 of ALTBalaji's Broken But Beautiful opposite Vikrant Massey.

In 2019 she appeared in the Hindi films, the Disney+ Hotstar original, Chappad Phaad Ke and the Netflix original, Upstarts. She then appeared in an episode of Voot's Fuh se Fantasy and also reprised her role in Season 2 of ALTBalaji's Broken But Beautiful.

She next appeared in the 2020 ZEE5 film Shukranu opposite Divyenndu and in the 2021 film Dilphire opposite Karan Kundra.

== Filmography ==
=== Films ===
- All films are in Hindi unless otherwise noted.

Year	Title	Role	Notes	Ref.
2016	Bambukat	Sammi	Punjabi film	
2017	Dark Brew	Ria Bajaj	Short film	
2018	Brij Mohan Amar Rahe	Simmi		
2019	Chappad Phaad Ke	Ketaki Gupchup		
2019	Upstarts	Jaya		
2020	Shukranu	Akriti		
TBA	Dilphire	Sonal		

=== Television ===
Year	Title	Role	Notes	Ref.
2018	Banned	Nirmal		
2018-2019	Broken But Beautiful	Alina	Season 1,2	
2019	Fuh se Fantasy	Alia/Sapna	Episode: "The Girl Next Door"	

=== Music videos ===
Year	Title	Singer	Notes	Ref.
2022	Jinna Royi Aan	Ninja	Cameo appearance	

== Awards and nominations ==
Year	Award	Category	Work	Result	Ref(s)
2017	Filmfare Awards Punjabi	Best Supporting Actress	Bambukat	Nominated	
