= Shukranu =

Indian web film

- Promotional poster
- Directed by: Bishnu Dev Halder
- Written by: Bishnu Dev Halde; Ravi Kumar; Sudhir Singh
- Starring: Divyenndu; Shweta Basu Prasad; Sheetal Thakur
- Cinematography: Sayak Bhattacharya
- Edited by: Devendra Murdeshwar
- Music by: Harish Sagane, Advait Nemlekar
- Production company: Zee5
- Distributed by: Zee5
- Release date: 14 February 2020
- Running time: 90 minutes
- Country: India
- Language: Hindi

Shukranu is an Indian film directed by Bishnu Dev Halder, starring Divyenndu, Shweta Basu Prasad and Sheetal Thakur. The film is produced by Reliance Entertainment.

== Synopsis ==
Shukranu is a fictional story based on true incidents. During Emergency in 1976 an estimated 6.2 million men were subjected to forced sterilization. About 2,000 of them lost their lives due to botched surgeries. Set in Delhi/UP/Haryana, Shukranu is a comic take on one of the darkest phases of Indian democracy through the encounters of a would-be groom who is forcibly sterilised just days before his much-awaited marriage.

== Cast ==
- Divyenndu as Inder
- Sheetal Thakur as Akriti
- Aakash Dabhade as Bhaanu
- Rajesh Khattar as Bhisham
- Shakti Singh as Maruti
