= Bambukat =

- Theatrical release postermal
- Directed by: Pankaj Batra
- Written by: Jass Grewal; Jatinder Lall
- Screenplay by: Jass Grewal
- Produced by: Amiek Virk; Karaj Gill
- Starring: Ammy Virk; Binnu Dhillon; Simi Chahal; Sheetal Thakur; Karamjit Anmol; Nirmal Rishi
- Cinematography: Vineet Malhotra
- Music by: Jatinder Shah
- Production companies: Rhythm Boyz Entertainment; Nadar Films
- Distributed by: Omjee Group(India); Rhythm Boyz(Overseas)
- Release date: 29 July 2016
- Running time: 118 minutes
- Country: India
- Language: Punjabi
- Box office: ₹24.51 crore

Bambukat is a 2016 Indian Punjabi-language period drama film written by Jass Grewal and directed by Pankaj Batra. Co-produced by Nadar Films and Rhythm Boyz Entertainment; it stars Ammy Virk, Binnu Dhillon, Simi Chahal and Sheetal Thakur in lead roles. The film follows the story of Channan Singh, a young man falls in love with Pakko and ferries her around the village on his bicycle. However, things change after Resham Singh arrives with his new motorbike. Bambukat also stars Karamjit Anmol, Anita Devgn, Sardar Sohi, Hobby Dhaliwal, and Nirmal Rishi; it marked the feature film debut for Simi Chahal.

Bambukat in the film has been referred to the “motor cycle”. Conceived as a romantic comedy set in the Punjab of 1960s, Bambukat's story was written by Jass Grewal. Principal photography of the film took place within a single schedule that lasted 40 days in Ferozpur with Vineet Malhotra serving as cinematographer. The soundtrack and background score of the film was composed by Jatinder Shah, with vocals from Ammy Virk, Amrinder Gill, Prabh Gill, Kaur B, and Rashi Sood.

The film was released worldwide on 29 July 2016, and was distributed by Omjee Group in India and Rhythm Boyz Entertainment at Overseas. The film opened to the positive reviews from critics and audience. The film has grossed ₹245.1 million in its whole theatrical run making it eleventh highest-grossing Punjabi film of all time and third highest grossing Punjabi film of 2016. At 1st Filmfare Awards Bambukat won eight awards including Best Film, Best Director (Batra), Best Actor Critics (Virk) and Best Supporting Actor (Dhillon).

== Plot ==
Channan is from a humble family of farmers but has interests in machinery. He is married to Pakko. On a visit to his in-laws, he realises the difference in their respect to his brother-in-law Resham Singh, who is a station-master and owns a motorcycle (Bambukat). He also wants one for himself in order to gain the respect in the eyes of his in-laws just like Resham Singh. So one day, he buys a Bambukat using the money from sale of his cattle. He doesn't know that it has been stolen from Nabha. Later, Channan is arrested. As for Pakko's fate, it is decided that she will be married to the maternal uncle of Resham Singh. Meanwhile, the jailer allows Channan to work in an abandoned mill at the premises of the jail as a mechanic due to his interests. When, Channan is informed about his spouse being married off to someone else, he plans his escape by designing and making a motorcycle from the junk parts in the mill. He escapes and is successful in stopping the marriage just in time.

== Cast ==
- Ammy Virk as Channan Singh
- Binnu Dhillon as Resham Singh
- Simi Chahal as Pakko/Parminder Kaur
- Sheetal Thakur as Sammi
- Karamjit Anmol as Channan's friend
- Sardar Sohi as Pakko's uncle
- Nirmal Rishi as Resham's mother
- Hobby Dhaliwal as Pakko's father
- Anita Devgan as Channan's mother
- Malkeet Rauni as Channan's father
- Harby Sangha as Gaama
- Razia Sukhbir as Bholi
- Veet Baljit (special appearance)
- Anmol Verma as Bishan
- Santosh Malhotra as Pakko's aunt
- Harp Farmer as Chanan's brother
- Davinder Singh as Pakko's brother
- Mahabir Bhullar as Maharaja Dayal Singh of Dharampur

== Soundtrack ==
S. No.	Track	Singer	Music	Lyrics
1.	"Jind"	Amrinder Gill	Jatinder Shah	Charan Likhari
2.	"Kainthe Wala"	Ammy Virk & Kaur B	Jatinder Shah	Veet Baljit
3.	"Langhe Paani"	Prabh Gill	Jatinder Shah	Vinder Nathumajra
4.	"Rakhi Soneya Ve"	Ammy Virk & Rashi Sood	Jatinder Shah	Veet Baljit
5.	"Bambukat" Title Song	Ammy Virk	Jatinder Shah	Veet Baljit

== Production ==
[Bambukat] is a story highlighting the social stereotypes and biases based on money, skin colour and outer appearances. The script is good and the story is relatable, and kept simple. But it has some strong themes. Two sisters, one born with a darker skin tone and the other fair, are married accordingly to a farmer and a government officer. The difference between their lifestyles and their own family’s biases results in some life-changing twists for the two couples. And at the centre of it all is a ‘bambukat’.

— Ammy Virk

The film was shot in Firozpur and the schedule continued for 40 days.

== Box office ==
Bambukat has grossed ₹24.51 crore worldwide in its whole theatrical run including ₹14.12 crore in India, making it eleventh highest-grossing Punjabi film worldwide and tenth highest-grossing Punjabi film in India.

=== India ===
The film netted ₹1.38 crore in North India on its opening day and became fourth highest opener upon its release. The film netted ₹1.46 crore and ₹1.81 crore on its second and third day respectively, making a weekend total of ₹4.65 crore. On its fourth day “Monday”, the film just dropped by 30 per cent even from a good opening day and netted ₹96 lacs. On its weekdays, the film netted ₹83 lacs, ₹71 lacs and ₹61 lacs respectively, making a week total of ₹7.76 crore in East Punjab. As of 6 August 2016, the film netted ₹9.5 crore in India and Box Office India declared the film as “Blockbuster”. In its whole theatrical run the film grossed ₹14.12 crore in India making it seventh highest grossing Punjabi film in India upon its release.

=== Overseas ===
It was released in over 65 screens in key international markets on 29 July and grossed approximately USD$1 million at the overseas box office in the first week.

== Critical reception ==
The Tribune gave the film a rating of 3 stars, describing the film as "slightly lengthy" but praised the acting. Times of India described it as a "delightfully sensitive story on the equations between family members depending on their financial grounding and aspirations". Gurlove Singh of BookMyShow said, “Bambukat is an honest film which is convincing, relatable and high on emotions.“ Sameer of Punjabi Mania said, “Bambukat is a pretty good film to watch and get entertained. Some smaller creative liberties here and there and the film is pretty good.”
