= Kanthan – The Lover of Colour =

2018 Malayalam-language film

- First look poster
- Directed by: Shareef Easa
- Written by: Pramod Kooveri
- Produced by: Shareef Easa
- Starring: Prajith; Daya Bai
- Cinematography: Priyan
- Edited by: Prashobh
- Music by: Sachin Balu
- Production company: Rolling Pix Entertainment
- Release dates: 18 July 2018 (Ernakulam); 26 August 2021 (OTT release)
- Running time: 90 minutes
- Country: India
- Language: Malayalam
- Budget: ₹200,000

Kanthan – The Lover of Colour is a 2018 Indian Malayalam-language drama film written by Pramod Kooveri and directed by Shareef Easa. It is produced by Shareef Easa under the banner of Rolling Pix Entertainment and has Prajith and social activist Daya Bai in the lead roles. The film won the 2018 Kerala State Film Award for Best Film. The film was released OTT in 2021.

== Plot ==
Set in Wayanad Thirunelly Nangara adivasi colony, the film tells the story of Kanthan, who became an orphan at a young age. 80 year old Ithyamma takes him under her wings and helps him face the world and its challenges.

== Cast ==
- Prajith as Kanthan
- Daya Bai as Ithyamma

== Awards ==
49th Kerala State Film Awards (2018)

- Kerala State Film Award for Best Film
