= Sexy Durga =

2017 Indian horror film

S Durga
- Directed by: Sanal Kumar Sasidharan
- Produced by: Aruna Mathew; Shaji Mathew
- Starring: Rajshri Deshpande; Kannan Nayar; Sujeesh KS; Baiju Netto; Arunsol; Vedh; Bilas Nair; Nistar Ahamed; Sujith Koyikkal; Vishnujith Asuren
- Cinematography: Prathap Joseph
- Edited by: Sanal Kumar Sasidharan
- Music by: Basil C J
- Production company: Niv Art Movies
- Release dates: 27 January 2017 (Rotterdam); 23 March 2018 (India)
- Running time: 85 minutes
- Country: India
- Language: Malayalam

Sexy Durga (Changed into S Durga for Indian release) is a 2017 Indian Malayalam-language indie horror film directed by Sanal Kumar Sasidharan. The film is about the religious divide in the society of Kerala and its effect on marriage between two people from two different religious backgrounds.

It has won the Hivos Tiger Award at the 2017 International Film Festival Rotterdam, and the 2017 Golden Apricot at Armenia's Yerevan International Film Festival in the category International Feature Competition.

== Synopsis ==
Durga, a North Indian migrant and a Keralite youth named Kabeer are running away at midnight. They are waiting for transportation to the nearest railway station to catch a train to a distant place. Two small time gangsters, transporting arms, offer assistance to the couple. The hapless "Durga" encounters a cross section of the society through the rest of the night. Parallel to the journey of Durga, another mysterious event intercuts in the film. In a Kerala village, devotees perform 'Garudan Thookkam', a ritual art form submitted as a reward for the problems solved in the abode of Goddess Kali, who represents Goddess Durga's personified wrath & embodied fury.

== Cast ==
- Rajshri Deshpande as Durga
- Kannan Nayar as Kabeer
- Vedh as Stranger
- Sujeesh KS as Stranger
- Arunsol as Stranger
- Bilas Nair as Stranger
- Baiju Netto as Sub Inspector
- Sujith Koyikkal as Policeman
- Nisthar Ahmed as Man on scooty

== Reception ==
Since the first screening as a work in progress film in the NFDC film Bazaar in Goa, the film has received good reviews from the viewers. Critic Gautaman Bhaskaran wrote in Hindustan Times "that was arguably one of the finest movies that this writer saw here". Baradwaj Rangan of Film Companion South wrote:

"Sasidharan likes games. In S Durga, the games are metaphorical, about the way we “toy” with others. In both films, these games start out as “fun” (though not for everyone), and end up revealing the ugliness inside the players, who are but a microcosm of a patriarchal society. These are, essentially, power games, with the strong preying on the weak. The strength comes from privilege (caste, class, gender, religious majoritarianism). The weakness rises from these very factors, but from the other end of the spectrum."

== Awards ==
- 19th Jio Mami Film Festival 2017 Mumbai India
- NFDC FILM BAZAAR – DI Award 2016
- Hivos Tiger Award in International Film Festival Rotterdam 2017
- Award for Professional Achievement in the Tarkovsky Film Festival in Russia for the excellence in cinematography
- The Young Jury award in the 53rd Pesaro Film Festival
- Special mention from the Official Jury in the 53rd Pesaro Film Festival
- Jury Mention for Direction in Cinema Jove, International Film Festival of Valencia, Spain.
- Jury Mention for Music Track in Cinema Jove, International Film Festival of Valencia, Spain.
- Golden Apricot Award in the International Feature Competition category in Yerevan International Film Festival 2017
- Best International Feature Narrative in Guanajuato International Film Festival, Mexico Expresión en Corto International Film Festival 2017
- Best International Feature award Reflet d’Or in the Geneva International Film Festival

== Film festivals ==
The film was screened at the following Film festivals:

- 19th Jio Mami Film Festival
- Mumbai Film Festival
- International Film Festival Rotterdam 2017.
- New Directors/New Films Festival 2017.
- Vilnius International Film Festival 2017.
- Indian Film Festival of Los Angeles 2017.
- Hong Kong International Film Festival 2017
- Minneapolis-Saint Paul International Film Festival 2017
- Sydney Film Festival 2017.
- Tarkovsky Film Festival 2017.
- Art Film Festival 2017
- Pesaro International Film Festival 2017
- Edinburgh International Film Festival 2017.
- London Indian Film Festival 2017.
- Cinema Jove Film Festival 2017.
- Taipei Film Festival 2017
- Lima Independiente International Film Festival 2017
- Yerevan International Film Festival 2017
- Guanajuato International Film Festival Expresión en Corto International Film Festival 2017
- New Horizons Film Festival 2017
- Anonimul International Film Festival 2017
