= Prathichaya =

2026 film by B. Unnikrishnan

- Directed by: B. Unnikrishnan
- Written by: B. Unnikrishnan
- Produced by: Gokulam Gopalan; RD Illuminations LLP
- Starring: Nivin Pauly; Balachandra Menon; Sharaf U Dheen; Harisree Ashokan; Sabitha Anand; Neethu Krishna; Ann Augustine
- Cinematography: Chandru Selvaraj
- Edited by: Manoj
- Music by: Justin Varghese
- Production companies: Sree Gokulam Movies; RD Illuminations LLP
- Distributed by: Sree Gokulam Movies
- Release date: 26 March 2026
- Running time: 162 minutes
- Country: India
- Language: Malayalam

Prathichaya is a 2026 Indian Malayalam-language political thriller film directed by B. Unnikrishnan. The film stars Nivin Pauly in the title role, while Balachandra Menon, Sharaf U Dheen, Sabitha Anand, Ann Augustine and Harisree Ashokan plays supporting roles. The film was produced by Sree Gokulam Movies and RD Illuminations LLP and the music is composed by Justin Varghese. The film develops as a tense father-son drama set against a backdrop of modern political warfare and digital surveillance. .

The film was released theatrically on 26 March 2026 and received mixed to negative reviews from critics. The film was a box office bomb.

== Plot ==
John Varghese, a tech entrepreneur who attempts to salvage the reputation of his father, a Chief Minister embroiled in a political scandal. As John deploys technology and strategic narratives to influence public perception, he uncovers layers of conspiracy involving political rivals, media manipulation and corporate interests.

== Cast ==
- Nivin Pauly as Chief Minister John Varghese
- Balachandra Menon as former Chief Minister of Kerala K. N. Varghese, John's father
- Sharaf U Dheen as Ravi Madhavan, the main antagonist
- Harisree Ashokan as Purushothaman
- Sabitha Anand as Annamma Varghese, John's mother
- Ann Augustine as Nisha Chandrakumar
- Saikumar as N. P. Jayadevan
- Maniyanpilla Raju as Minister Ramakrishan, later Chief Minister
- Chirag Jani as Sukesh Pandey
- Nishanth Sagar as MP Tobin Varghese, John's brother
- Vishnu Agasthya as Arvind
- Neethu Krishna as Rosa John
- Vijitha Vijayakumar as Rani Tobin
- Megha Thomas as Commissioner Thara Vijayan IPS
- Gopu Kesav as DGP Somasundaram IPS
- Nandini Gopalakrishnan
- Baby Dhwani as Mariya Tobin
- Vyshakh as Ishaan Tejas
- Aneena as Elizabeth Jacob
- Baby Fyza as Aswini Chandrakumar

== Release ==
The film was released theatrically on 26 March 2026.

The digital streaming rights of the film is acquired by JioHotstar and began streaming from 24 April 2026.

== Reception ==
=== Critical response ===
The film received mixed reviews from critics.

Sajin Sreejith of The Week rated 4 out of 5 and wrote "B. Unnikrishnan's best film with efficient turns from Nivin Pauly and Balachandra Menon".

Latha Srinivasan of NDTV gave 2 out of 5 stars and wrote "Prathichaya turns out to be a slow-paced family and political drama with an underwhelming script".

Anandu Suresh of The Indian Express gave 2 out of 5 stars and wrote "Prathichaya is marred throughout by poor performances from the main cast".

S R Praveen of The Hindu reviewed the film as "Not even a whitewash can contemporise this old-fashioned political thriller".

Vignesh Madhu of Cinema Express wrote "A dated political drama lifted by flashes of sharp writing ".

Sanjay Ponnappa of India Today wrote "This Nivin Pauly film needs max patience for minimal pay-off".

Princy Alexander of Onmanorama wrote "B Unnikrishnan-Nivin Pauly film is an emotionally-charged political thriller".
