= CR No: 89 =

- Screening Poster for IFFK 2013
- Directed by: Sudevan
- Written by: Sudevan
- Produced by: Pace Trust
- Starring: Ashok Kumar; Pradeep Kumar; Santhosh Babu
- Cinematography: Shaan P Rahman; Prathap Joseph; Saadiq Thrithala
- Edited by: Binoy Jayaraj
- Music by: Rajesh Dass
- Production company: Pace Productions
- Release dates: December 2013 (IFFK); 5 June 2015 (Kerala)
- Country: India
- Language: Malayalam

CR No: 89 is a 2013 Indian Malayalam drama film written and directed by Sudevan. It stars debutantes Ashok Kumar, Pradeep Kumar, and Santhosh Babu in lead roles. CR No: 89 was crowdfunded by Pace Trust.

It premiered at the 18th International Film Festival of Kerala in December 2013, where it won the NETPAC Award for Best Malayalam Film. It won numerous other awards including the Kerala State Film Award for Best Film, Kerala State Film Award for Second Best Actor for Kumar, and the Aravindan Award for Best Debut Director for Sudevan.

CR No: 89 released in India on 5 June 2015.

== Plot ==
The movie starts with a fully loaded jeep moving on NH during night. The driver receives a call in his mobile and is informed that they were betrayed by someone, and so they have to leave NH and opt for a parallel path to reach destination. He was also intimated to keep their mobiles off and not to call anyone during the journey. While taking another path via forest, the jeep goes off and with no-one around the driver and assistant had to spend the night in the forest path.

Next day, in a nearby village, a guy has started inviting for his marriage. To invite his relatives who leaves in quite far off places, his friend gives him his two wheeler.

The next day, the driver of the jeep reaches a nearby garage in a two-wheeler and picks up the mechanic to the jeep. On querying, the mechanic was told that toys were present in the jeep. The mechanic finds fault with the diesel pipe of the jeep. The driver goes in the two wheeler to get a new diesel pipe. During the course of time, the mechanic smells something fishy, when he notices the parts of broken indicator light of the two wheeler lying on the ground. He also finds that the registration number of the jeep was actually a fake one stickered on the numbered plate. When he enquires to the assistant, the assistant gets arrogant asking him to mind his own business. When the assistant moves into a short sleep, the mechanic checks the load within the jeep and finds swords and similar weapons concealed within vegetable boxes. On seeing this the assistant gets angry and he beats the mechanic. While the driver returns with a newly bought diesel pipe, the mechanic refuses to repair the jeep, and asks for the person who came in the two wheeler. The driver shows him with mouth and hands tied, hidden in a nearby area. The two wheeler guy pleads to free him as it is a borrowed bike, and his marriage is approaching and that he has to invite a few relatives that day. The driver tells that once the jeep gets repaired, they all can go. However the mechanic stays still. The assistant gets angry with mechanic as he stays stubborn without repairing the jeep, and hits him again. While they hear the sound of another two wheeler approaching, they hide the mechanic and two wheeler guy and somehow manages to handle the situation without any problem and sends them off. The driver asks the two wheeler guy to do something so that the mechanic repairs the jeep and that they all can leave. However the mechanic stays still, to which the driver gets annoyed and hits the mechanic. Ultimately the driver and assistant flee the scene in the two wheeler. The assistant guy of the mechanic arrives there with the lunch in a bicycle and he sets the two wheeler guy free. The mechanic then flattens the jeep tyres and they leave the scene, taking the two wheeler guy pledging to leave him at the nearest junction where he can get some form of vehicle.

A forest guy sees the jeep and he comes to check what is within it. He takes a sword and also takes tomatoes with him and leaves.

== Cast ==
- Asok Kumar
- Pradeep Kumar
- Santhosh Babu
- Achuthanandan
- Saradhi
- Kalyan
- Beena
- Vappukka
- Narayanan
- Mani
- Azeez
- Anil
- Subran

== Awards ==
- NETPAC Award for Best Malayalam Film at the 18th International Film Festival of Kerala – CR No: 89
- Kerala State Film Award for Best Film – CR No: 89
- Kerala State Film Award for Second Best Actor – Ashok Kumar
- John Abraham Award for Best Malayalam Film – CR No: 89
- Aravindan Award for Best Debut Director – Sudevan
- Padmarajan Award for Cinema – CR No: 89
