= Oru Rathri Oru Pakal =

Indian Film

- Directed by: Prathap Joseph
- Written by: Prathap Joseph
- Produced by: Minimal Cinema; House of Illusions
- Starring: Yamuna Chungappalli; Mari; Saheer Mohammed; Najil Hameed; Lennon Gopin; Rahoof K Razak; Vyshak Unnikrishnan
- Cinematography: Prathap Joseph; Anand Pottekkat; Gireesh Raman
- Edited by: Anand Pottekkat
- Release date: 9 December 2019
- Running time: 76 minutes
- Country: India
- Language: Malayalam

Oru Rathri Oru Pakal (A night, a day) is a 2019 Indian Malayalam film written and directed by Prathap Joseph, His fourth film as a cinematographer-director, is set and filmed in Shoranur and stars Yamuna Chungappalli and Mari in the lead roles. It references of honour killing.

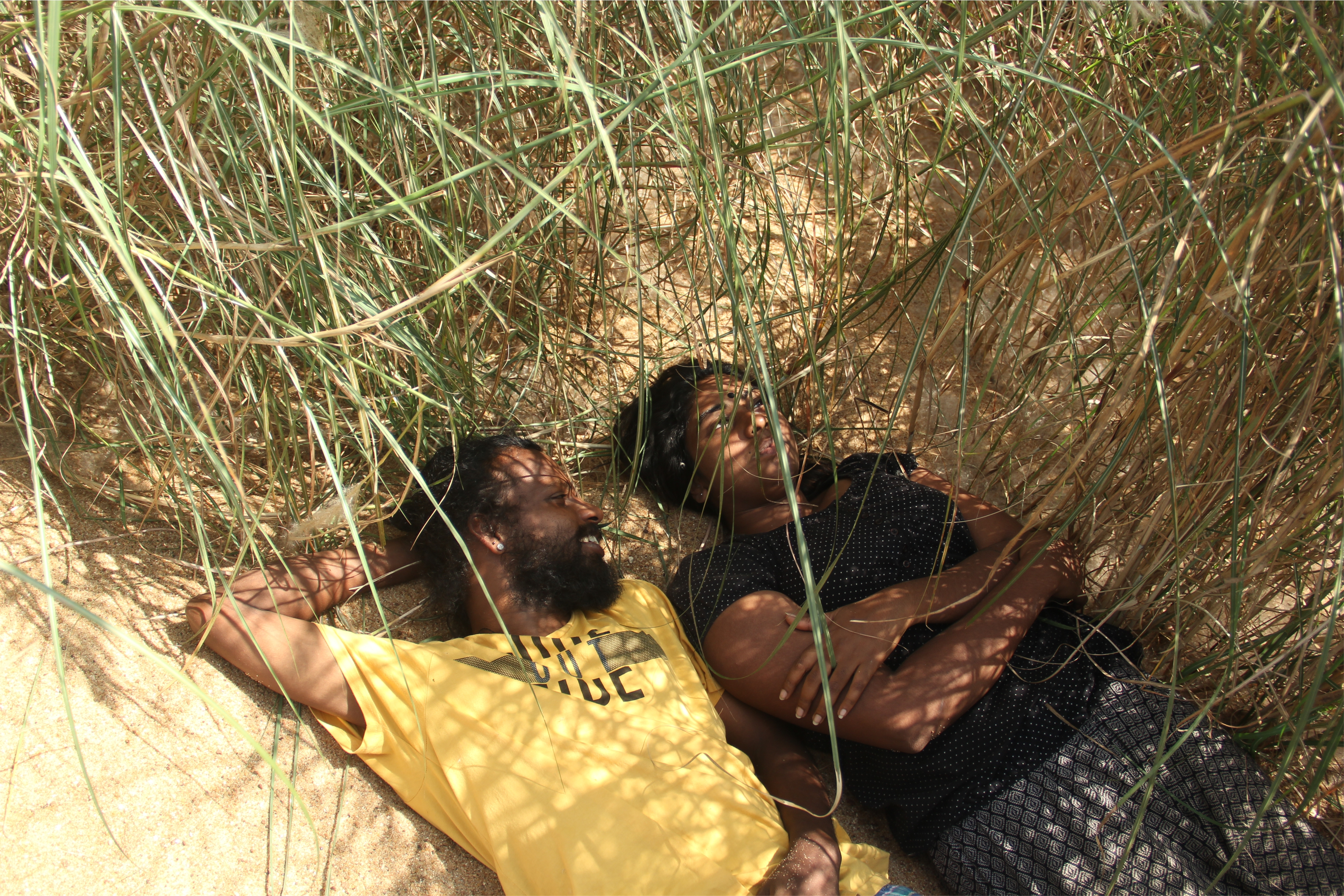

== Festivals Participated ==
The film had its Indian premiere in Dec 2019 at the 3rd edition of the Kazhcha-Niv Independent Film Festival (KNIFF).

From KNIFF, the film travelled to the Kasargod International Film Festival. And then made it to the Open Screen. The film has also been selected in the Panchajanyam International Film festival, the International Film Festival of Trichur, the Independent Film Festival of Chennai, the Yashwant International Film festival, the Orange City International Film Festival, and the Independent Film Festival of Melbourne.

Oru Rathri Oru Pakal and Dr. Biju's Veyilmarangal are the two Malayalam films nominated for the Pune International Film Festival.
