= Baapya =

2026 Indian comedy drama film

- Official theatrical poster
- Directed by: Sameer Tewari
- Written by: Sameer Tewari; Vikrant Katkar; Nikhil Palande; Gaurav Relekar; Manish Tiwari; Priti Nair
- Screenplay by: Sameer Tewari; Vikrant Katkar
- Story by: Priti Nair
- Produced by: Sameer Tewari; Muktal Telang
- Starring: Rajshri Deshpande; Girish Kulkarni; Shrikant Yadav; Devika Daftardar; Aaryan Menghji
- Cinematography: Rao Nandakishore
- Production company: Working I Films
- Release date: 15 May 2026
- Country: India
- Language: Marathi

Baapya is an Indian Marathi comedy drama film written and directed by Sameer Tewari and produced by Muktal Telang and Sameer Tewari. The film stars Rajshri Deshpande, Girish Kulkarni, Shrikant Yadav, Devika Daftardar and Aaryan Menghji. The film is based on gender identity, family relationships and social acceptance in a rural Konkan region.

== Plot ==
Set in coastal Konkan, the film follows the return of Shailaja, who came to the village as Shailesh after undergoing gender reassignment surgery. The unexpected return disrupts the lives of the family and the close-knit community, forcing them to confront questions surrounding identity, acceptance and social norms.

== Cast ==
- Rajshri Deshpande as Shailaja and Shailesh
- Girish Kulkarni as Anil Borkar
- Shrikant Yadav as Shinde
- Devika Daftardar as Vishakha
- Aaryan Menghji as Sanju
- Varsha Dandale as Vishakha's mother
- Gauri Kiran as Shailaja's sister
- Ananda Karekar as Shailaja's brother-in-law
- Atharva Fadnis as Babadya

== Production ==
The film was directed by Sameer Tewari, produced under the banner of Working I Films.

== Release ==
The film was released on 15 May 2026.

== Reception ==
Writing for The Times of India, Anub George the reviewer gave 3.5 stars out of 5 and described the film as "a breath of fresh air" and praised its performances and treatment of gender identity themes.

Bryan Durham of varietyindia reviewed the film and said "Sparks a commendable conversation on gender dysphoria and leaves it at that"

Nandini Ramnath of scroll.in revied the movie and commented "A gender bender about a man who loved a woman who was always a man".

Santosh Bhingarde of sakal gave 3.5 stars out of 5 and stated "A dark portrayal of the complex emotional world in a relationship"

Rahul Desai of The Hollywood Reporter India reviewed the movie and said "Rajshri Deshpande Rescues A Tonally Awkward Drama"

Rajiv Vijayakar of South Asian Herald commended the film for addressing a significant social issue in an entertaining and accessible manner, while praising its performances and screenplay.

Reshma Raikwar of Loksatta reviewed the movie and described as a good attempt to address the subject of gender transition in Marathi cinema. She praised director Sameer Tewari's effort to present a complex subject in an accessible and entertaining manner while highlighting the performances of Rajshri Deshpande and Girish Kulkarni.

Daily Kesari described the movie as a sensitive yet courageous exploration of gender transition and personal identity.

Subhash K. Jha of The Tribune reviewed the film as "bold, brave, beautiful".

== Awards and nominations ==
Year	Award	Category	Recipient(s)	Result	Reference
2026	Pune International Film Festival	Best International Marathi Film	Baapya	Won	
2026	Pune International Film Festival	Best Actor	Girish Kulkarni	Won	
2026	Pune International Film Festival	Best Actress	Rajshri Deshpande	Won	
