= Brij Mohan Amar Rahe =

2018 film by Nikhil Bhat

- Official poster
- Directed by: Nikhil Nagesh Bhat
- Written by: Nikhil Nagesh Bhat; Kuldeep Ruhil
- Screenplay by: Nikhil Nagesh Bhat
- Starring: Arjun Mathur; Nidhi Singh; Sheetal Thakur; Manav Vij; Sunny Hinduja; Vijayant Kohli; Yogendra Tikku
- Cinematography: Pooja S Gupte
- Edited by: Debaloy Bhattacharya; Afzal Shaikh
- Music by: Andrew T. Mackay
- Production company: Yoodlee Films
- Distributed by: Netflix
- Release date: August 3, 2018
- Country: India
- Language: Hindi

Brij Mohan Amar Rahe (transl. Long live Brij Mohan!) is a 2018 Indian Hindi-language action comedy film directed and co-written by Nikhil Nagesh Bhat. The film stars Arjun Mathur, Nidhi Singh, Sheetal Thakur, Manav Vij, Sunny Hinduja, Vijayant Kohli and Yogendra Tikku in key roles.

== Plot ==
The film opens with Brij Mohan Gupta, a man in his mid 30’s, making out with Simmi, his 24-year-old mistress. Brij is the owner of a hosiery store, which is not profitable enough to lead a successful life. He is also fed up with his loud-mouthed wife, Sweety.

To make easy money, Brij takes a loan of INR 25 Lakh from Raghu, a money lender, through a business deal with Suri, a lehenga seller. However, this was all a ruse by Suri, who sold off his old stock to Brij, who ais left to pay Raghu the money. Raghu slowly starts threatening and harassing Brij, who decides to fake his death, but to no avail, as he cannot find the perfect body that matches his.

In a quarrel with Raghu, Brij pushes him down the stairs, and decides to fake his death with Raghu's. After doing everything, including exchanging his gold tooth, Brij ties Raghu to the car, and sets it on fire, unknowingly burning Raghu alive.

Brij now adopts the name Amar Sethi and shaves his head and beard. He hides in a small hotel with Simmi, along with the money he stole from Raghu's locker. The police get to know of Brij's disappearance through Sweety, as a store owner accused her of giving a false cheque originally signed by Brij. Inspector Beniwal is attracted towards Sweety, which she uses to her advantage.

Frustrated while living with Amar alias Brij, Simmi is locked in their room and Brij cannot even make it during sex. She finds the money that Brij had hidden and tries to run away with it, but he catches her and, in the ensuing fight, kills her. Beniwal finds the burnt body of Raghu and claims it as Brij's, as it has a gold tooth identified by Sweety. After the funeral rites of Brij, Beniwal and Sweety get intimate in front of Brij's photograph.

Meanwhile, a missing mobile phone report is launched, which belonged to Brij and they arrest Amar for robbing the phone. He says he does not know anything. Beniwal had already learned that Amar is in fact Brij from Sweety, but he keeps it to himself. After a hilarious interrogation, Amar admits that he is Brij. But the police do not believe him. Brij is sent to life imprisonment, but Beniwal decides to set him free in exchange for money. But Brij evades him and runs away with the money. The judge does not get his money, and in anger, announces the verdict to hang Amar for the murder of Brij.

== Cast ==
- Arjun Mathur as Brij Mohan Gupta
- Nidhi Singh as Sweety Gupta
- Sheetal Thakur as Simmi
- Manav Vij as Inspector Beniwal
- Sunny Hinduja as Raghu
- Yogendra Tiku as Sinha Judge
- Vijayant Kohli as Suri- Shop Owner
- Aanchal Chauhan as Chamki- The Prostitute

== Soundtrack ==
The music for the film has been done by Andrew T. Mackay. A song titled "Balma Yeh Karma" from the film was released on 4 August 2017.

Brij Mohan Amar Rahe

Soundtrack album
- Released: 2018
- Recorded: 2017–2018
- Labels: Zee Music Company; Saregama

== Reception ==
Brij Mohan Amar Rahe received generally negative reviews from critics. Rohan Nahar of Hindustan Times gave the film 1 star out of 5 and called the film the worst entry from Netflix Indian original film. Karishma Upadhyay of First Post gave 1 star out of 5. She praised the main cast and felt the film length is a drag. Vinod Kathayat of Movies Forever gave 2 stars out of 5 and called the film a missed opportunity.
