= Yoodlee Films =

Indian film production company

- Type: Private
- Industry: Entertainment
- Founded: 2017
- Headquarters: Mumbai, India
- Key people: Siddharth Anand Kumar
- Products: Film production
- Owner: Saregama
- Website: yoodleefilms.com

Yoodlee Films is an Indian film production company, a division of Saregama India Limited. Founded in 2017, it is headquartered in Mumbai and is headed by Siddharth Anand Kumar. The studio credits itself for "fearless filmmaking". Their films are shot at real locations with a maximum duration not more than 120 minutes. Since its inception, Yoodlee Films has made 17 films across genres and languages, debuting with the critically acclaimed Ajji (2017).

== Films ==
Yoodlee's first film Ajji directed by Devashish Makhija released in November, 2017. It is a modern-day version of the European children's story Little Red Riding Hood. Their next film Kuchh Bheege Alfaaz (2018) was directed by Onir.

Their third film 'Abhiyum Anuvum' was the production house's first venture in regional cinema. Brij Mohan Amar Rahe was the first Netflix Original from Yoodlee Films, released across 190 countries. 'Noblemen', their 6th release and a thematic representation of The Merchant of Venice, premiered at the New York Indian Film Festival in 2018 for which actor Ali Haji won the 'Best Child Actor' award. They ended the year 2018 with 'Hamid'- an adaptation of the play Phone No. 786 by Mohd. Amin Bhat. The film went on to win the National Film Award for Best Feature Film in Urdu at the 66th National Film Awards

K.D., was their first release of 2019. Actor Naga Vishal won the Best Actor Award at the Jagran Film Festival 2019 and Madhumita the Best Director at the UK Asian Film Festival 2019 for the same. During the 67th National Film Awards, Naga Vishal bagged the National Award for 'Best Child Artist' for his role as Kutty in the film. Their next, Chote Nawab, directed by Kumud Chaudhary won the Best Feature Film award at the Indian Film Festival of Cincinnati 2020. Habbadi, directed by Nachiket Samant, was also officially selected at the Indian Film Festival of Cincinnati 2020.

Bahut Hua Sammaan, a political satire directed by Ashish R Shukla, starring Raghav Juyal, Abhishek Chauhan, Sanjay Mishra, Ram Kapoor, Nidhi Singh, Namit Das and Flora Saini opened to good critic reviews with Free Press Journal describing the film as "refreshing", while The New Indian Express terming the movie as "stylish and contemporary".

Their first film of 2021, was Collar Bomb which released under the banner of "Disney+Hotstar Multiplex" and went on to become the most streamed content of the week (12 - 18 July) across OTT platforms as it registered over 5.6 million views. Their next, 200: Halla Ho which stars Amol Palekar, Rinku Rajguru, Barun Sobti and Sahil Khattar in lead roles is inspired by true events and will release on 20 August on Zee5. 2021 will see the release of Zombivli, the first Marathi zombie horror comedy.

== Filmography ==
Key
†	Denotes films that have not yet been released

Year	Title	Language	Notes
2017	Ajji	Hindi	
2018	Kuchh Bheege Alfaaz	Hindi	
2018	Abhiyum Anuvum	Tamil	
2018	Brij Mohan Amar Rahe	Hindi	
2018	Ascharya Fuck It	Hindi	
2018	Noblemen	Hindi	
2018	Music Teacher	Hindi	
2018	Hamid	Urdu	
2019	K.D.	Tamil	
2019	Chote Nawab	Hindi	
2019	Habbadi	Hindi	
2019	Chappad Phaad Ke	Hindi	
2019	Kanpuriye	Hindi	Anthology film
2020	Axone	Hindi; English	
2020	Chaman Bahaar	Hindi	
2020	Comedy Couple	Hindi	
2020	Bahut Hua Samman	Hindi	
2021	Collar Bomb	Hindi	
2021	200: Halla Ho	Hindi	
2021	Zombivli	Marathi	
2022	Super Senior Heroes	Tamil	
2022	Padavettu	Malayalam	
2022	Oye Makhna	Punjabi	
2022	Kaapa	Malayalam	
2023	Kasargold	Malayalam	
2023	United Kacche	Hindi	Web series released on ZEE5
2023	Agra	Hindi	
2024	Malaikottai Vaaliban	Malayalam	
2024	Anweshippin Kandethum	Malayalam	
2024	Manorathangal	Malayalam	Anthology series released on ZEE5
2025	Bazooka	Malayalam	
2026	Party Animals	Hindi	

== Accolades ==
Recipient	Event	Category	Ref(s)
Hamid	National Film Award	Best Urdu Film	
Hamid	Fajr International Film Festival	The Muhammad Al- Ameen Award Diploma of Honour for Best Film on Peace	
Hamid	UK Asian Film Festival	Best Film	
Axone	UK Asian film festival	Youth Curated Choice Award	
Axone	Indus Valley International Film Festival	Best Film on Comic Theme	
Axone	Toulouse Indian Film Festival	Special Mention: Jury Awards	
