= Jai Ganesh (film) =

2024 Indian Malayalam thriller film by Ranjith Sankar

- Poster
- Directed by: Ranjith Sankar
- Written by: Ranjith Sankar
- Produced by: Ranjith Sankar; Unni Mukundan
- Starring: Unni Mukundan; Mahima Nambiar; Ashokan
- Cinematography: Chandru Selvaraj
- Edited by: Sangeeth Prathap
- Music by: Sankar Sharma
- Production companies: Dreams N Beyond; Unni Mukundan Films
- Distributed by: UMF (India)
- Release date: 11 April 2024
- Running time: 125 minutes
- Country: India
- Language: Malayalam

Jai Ganesh (transl. Hail Ganesh) is a 2024 Indian Malayalam-language action thriller film written and directed by Ranjith Sankar. The film was jointly produced by Unni Mukundan and Ranjith under the banners of Unni Mukundan Films and Dreams N Beyond. The film stars Unni Mukundan, Mahima Nambiar, Ravindra Vijay, Ashokan and Jomol.

The film was officially announced in August 2023. Principal photography commenced in November 2023 in Ernakulam. The film has music composed by Sankar Sharma, cinematography by Chandru Selvaraj and editing by Sangeeth Prathap.

Jai Ganesh was released in theatres on 11 April 2024 and received mixed to positive reviews from critics and audiences alike and was an average success at the box office.

== Plot ==
Ganesh is a paraplegic ethical hacker working for Neerali Pavithran in his online yellow journal Neerali, having been disabled waist down in a motorcycle accident during his college days. He is also an aspiring comic artist and has created a superhero comic strip called Jai Ganesh. Nidhi is a failed entrepreneur who is hoping to succeed in her latest venture, a comic reader mobile app. In the beginning, Ganesh is shown to help Adv. Parvathy Marar in a drug case, where he helps Narayanan's wrongly convicted driver son to be acquitted with proofs got from his hacking skills that he was only the driver of the package and was not aware of the goods being transported. Ganesh lives with his friends in a city flat and visits his father at his village house often. He is frustrated by his shortcomings and his father tries always to inspire him to move on with his limitations and achieve something bigger.

Ganesh is forced to publish an article in Neerali against MLA Prasad Puthren, holding him responsible for the waste plant issue in the district. Prasad, who lives in the same flat as Ganesh, does not like him as a result but his son Rayaan likes Ganesh very much and is an avid fan of his comics. Nidhi and Ganesh get off on the wrong foot during a meeting to pitch his comics idea for her app but starts getting along each other well. She manages to get an appointment with a businesswoman to invest in her app and schedules a meeting with her, informing Ganesh of the same. Rayaan's birthday the previous day and Ganesh shows up for the same although initially hesitant. That night Rayaan is abducted from the flat by an unknown kidnapper while he was playing with Ganesh. The police search frantically for leads with the available CCTV footages and Ganesh finally discovers the kidnapper to be a mentally unstable father Mohan Selvaraj, whose daughter has died from the continuous toxic air pollution caused by the waste plant. His daughter has been documenting all the developments through her online YouTube channel and Mohan starts recording in it once he loses his daughter. Mentally deranged and out to take revenge against Prasad, he kidnaps Rayaan, hides him in a soundproof room releasing fatal chlorine gas slowly and leaves him to die there as a punishment to Prasad to make his son meet the same fates as Mohan's Daughter. He declares all this on the live YouTube channel and commits suicide online with a lethal poison injection, so as the whereabouts of Rayaan's location is not divulged.

The police and Ganesh start working to locate Rayaan's imprisoned location. Mohan has set up an online video call from the place to his own laptop, forcing the police and Prasad to watch Rayaan slowly getting killed by the poisoned gas. He uses a VPN to mask the IP address so that the location is not divulged. Ganesh manages to trace a coffee shop and a movie theatre from some static IP details and lets the police check both the locations, but both turn out to be false leads. With time closing in, someone from within the police force leaks the videocall visuals to Neerali and it gets out to the public. The same police falsely accuse Ganesh of leaking the same since he himself is a Neerali employee. Unsuccessful at his attempt and because of the new developments, he is forced to leave the police cybercell.

He checks the CCTV footages from the coffee shop again and finds out that Mohan visited the place to meet someone and identifies the second person as a sound technician who does the sound proof installations around the city. He checks with his colleagues and the coffee shop owner to finally trace the location with the help of Narayanan's son to be the info park where this room is built in a new company set to open the following days. Ganesh manages to reach there and hack in the soundproof rooms face recognition DB to add his face to the access control. Despite his inability, he manages to stand up briefly with the help of his wheelchair and open the door, thus saving Rayyan in the nick of time. Parallelly, Nidhi has a successful meeting with the probable investor, managing to get funds to develop her app featuring Jai Ganesh.

== Cast ==
- Unni Mukundan as Ganesh alias Jai Ganesh, a graphic designer and Computer Expert
- Mahima Nambiar as Nidhi, Ganesh's Love Interest
- Ravindra Vijay as Mohan Selvaraj, The Kidnapper of Ayan
- Ashokan as Chandran, Ganesh's father and Mechanical Technician
- Jomol as Adv. Parvathy Marar, Kerala High Court Public Prosecutor
- Hareesh Peradi as Narayanan
- Nandu as Neerali Pavithran, A Channel Reporter
- Srikanth K Vijayan as Thrikakara MLA Prasad Puthren
- Rayaan Kaimal as Ayan Prasad, Prasad Puthren's Son
- Benzi Mathews as Ernakulam SIT & City Police Commissioner DIG Haresh Balakrishnan IPS
- Ann Saleem as Wafa Ahmed, Ernakulam Cyber Cell Wing
- Leela Samson as Investor

== Production ==
=== Development ===
The film marks the 15th directorial venture of Ranjith Sankar. On 22 August 2023, Ranjith Sankar announced that he will be collaborating with Unni Mukundan for his next project. Unni Mukundan and Ranjith Sankar jointly produced the film under the banners of Unni Mukundan Films and Dreams N Beyond. Chandru Selvaraj was recruited to handle the cinematography and Sangeeth Prathap was assigned as the editor.

=== Casting ===
After the success of Malikappuram (2022), Unni Mukundan signed to play the lead role in the film. Later, he decided to produce the film with Ranjith Sankar. Mahima Nambiar signed to play the female lead. Jomol reportedly made a special appearance as a criminal lawyer after a hiatus. The cast also includes Hareesh Peradi, Ashokan, Ravindra Vijay and Nandu.

=== Filming ===
The filming began on 9 November 2023 with a puja ceremony held at the Thrikkakara Temple. The first clap was given by Unni Mukundan's father, M. Mukundan. Principal photography of the film reportedly began on 11 November 2023. The first schedule was completed and shoot will be completed in December as per the reports. Filming is underway in the surrounding areas of Ernakulam.

== Music ==
The original background score and songs were composed by Sankar Sharma.

| Track | Song title | Singer(s) | Lyricist |
|---|---|---|---|
| 1 | "Prakashangale" | Vineeth Sreenivasan | B.K. Harinarayanan |
| 2 | "Aarambhamaay" | Kapil Kapilan | Manu Manjith |
| 3 | "Neram" | Rzee, Bhadra Rajin | Rzee |
| 4 | "Paranna Vazhikal" | Zia Ul Haq | Ranjith Sankar |
| 5 | "En Tholile" | Karthikeya Murthy | Vani Mohan |
| 6 | "Nee Tharum" | Ayraan | Santhosh Varma |
| 7 | "Unstoppable" | AI | Sandra Madhav |
| 8 | "Oru Paadu Paaduvan" | Madhu Balakrishnan | Santhosh Varma |
| 9 | "En Tholile (Reprise)" | Varun Viswanath | Vani Mohan |

== Release ==
=== Theatrical ===
The film was released in theatres across India on 11 April 2024 and received mixed to positive reviews from critics and audiences alike. The film was released in overseas on 19 April 2024.
