= Sudevan =

Indian filmmaker and script writer

- Born: 2 May 1975 (age 51); Peringod Palakkad, Kerala
- Occupations: Film director, writer, producer
- Parent(s): Madhavan Vaidyar & Seetha
- Awards: Kerala State Film Award for Best Film in 2013 for the film CR No: 89

Sudevan (also known as Sudevan P.P.), (born on 2 May 1975), is an Indian filmmaker and script writer based in Kerala, India.

== Early life ==
He was born and raised in Peringode, Kerala, in 1975. He studied at Peringode high school and Sree Neelakanta Govt. Sanskrit College, Pattambi.

== Career ==
Sudevan's directorial debut was an ad about the ‘Ropeway’ in Malampuzha, Kerala.

In 2004 he made a short film, Varoo (Come with me). This was followed by Planning in 2007 and Randu (Two, 2009), both of which were screened at short film festivals and broadcast by television networks in the region. Thattumporathappan (Lord of the Attic, 2010) is Sudevan's fourth film. It explores the evolution of religious faith and its after-effects, through a tale set in his hometown.

Sudevan's first feature film CR No: 89 points out the consequences of the percolation of weapons and its effect on smaller societies. This film won seven awards from Kerala. CR No: 89 appeared at Hong Kong International Film Festival (2015), Malaysian Malayalam Film Festival (2015), Colombo International film festival Sri Lanka (2014), Hanoi International Film Festival, Vietnam (2014) and International Film Festival of Kerala in )(2013).

He made the film Akatho Puratho (In or Out, 2018). The film portrays that Inside or outside is an image of four copies of a transit between greed and excitement to a vacuum.

== Filmography ==
Year	Title	Role	Director
2005	Varoo (Come with me) Short film	Writer	Director
2007	Planning Short film	Writer	Director
2009	Randu (Two) Short film	Writer	Director
2010	' 'Thattumporathappan (Lord of the Attic) Short film	Writer	Director
2013	CR No: 89 Feature Length (released in 2015)	Writer	Director
2017	'Akatho Puratho (In or Out)' Feature Length (released through CAVE India OTT Platform on 2 February 2021)	Writer	Director

== Recognition ==
- Netpac award (2013)
- John Abraham National Awards (2014)
- Aravindan award (2014)
- Padmarajan Award (2014)
- Mohan Raghavan Puraskaram (2014)
