= Vazhakku =

2022 Indian thriller film

- Directed by: Sanal Kumar Sasidharan
- Written by: Sanal Kumar Sasidharan
- Produced by: Parrot Mount Pictures; Tovino Thomas Productions
- Starring: Tovino Thomas; Kani Kusruti; Sudev Nair; Azees Nedumangad
- Cinematography: Chandru Selvaraj
- Edited by: Sanal Kumar Sasidharan
- Music by: Prithvi Chandrasekhar
- Production companies: Parrot Mount Pictures; Tovino Thomas Productions
- Release date: 29 July 2022
- Country: India
- Language: Malayalam

Vazhakku (transl. Quarrel) is a 2022 Indian Malayalam-language film directed and edited by Sanal Kumar Sasidharan starring Tovino Thomas, Kani Kusruti, Sudev Nair, and Azees Nedumangad. The film is about a lawyer named Siddharthan who is going through a divorce. He meets a woman named Sathi and her daughter, who are also going through marital problems. The two families are going through their difficult times.

The film was released on 29 July 2022, in India. The film was screened at the 27th edition of the International Film Festival of Kerala among the only 12 Malayalam language film screened and was also selected to premier at Korean international Film Festival IFFSA-SEOUL 2022. Vazhakku won several awards at the 54th Kerala State Film Awards, including three Best Child Artist, Best Cinematography and Best Visual Effects. The film was later released for free on Vimeo on 14 May 2024.

== Plot ==
Siddharthan (Tovino Thomas), a lawyer, was going through a tumultuous divorce. On the day scheduled for the signing of their mutual divorce agreement, he betrayed his wife, Lakshmi, by engaging in infidelity before embarking on an inland drive. Desperate to salvage their marriage, he pleaded with Lakshmi over the phone to postpone the divorce, citing their daughter Tara's well-being. His attempt, however, proved futile. During his return journey, a chance encounter with Sathi (Kani Kusruti) and her mute daughter, who were also facing marital turmoil, profoundly altered his perspective on life. Feeling a deep sense of dissatisfaction and emptiness, he sought meaning in his existence. His meeting with Sathi, a woman similarly disillusioned with her marriage, led to further complications in both their lives.

== Cast ==
- Tovino Thomas as Sidharthan
- Devaki Rajendran as Lakshmi
- Kani Kusruti as Sathi
- Sudev Nair as Unknown Authority
- Azees Nedumangad as Reghu
- Byju Netto as Helper
- Thanmaya Sol as Thara

== Awards and nominations ==
Award	Category	Recipient	Result	Ref.
53rd Kerala State Film Awards	Best Child Artist (Female)	Thanmaya Sol	Won	
53rd Kerala State Film Awards	Best Cinematography	Chandru Selvaraj	Won	
53rd Kerala State Film Awards	Best Visual Effects	Anish T, Sumesh Gopal	Won	
