= Daya Bai =

Indian social activist

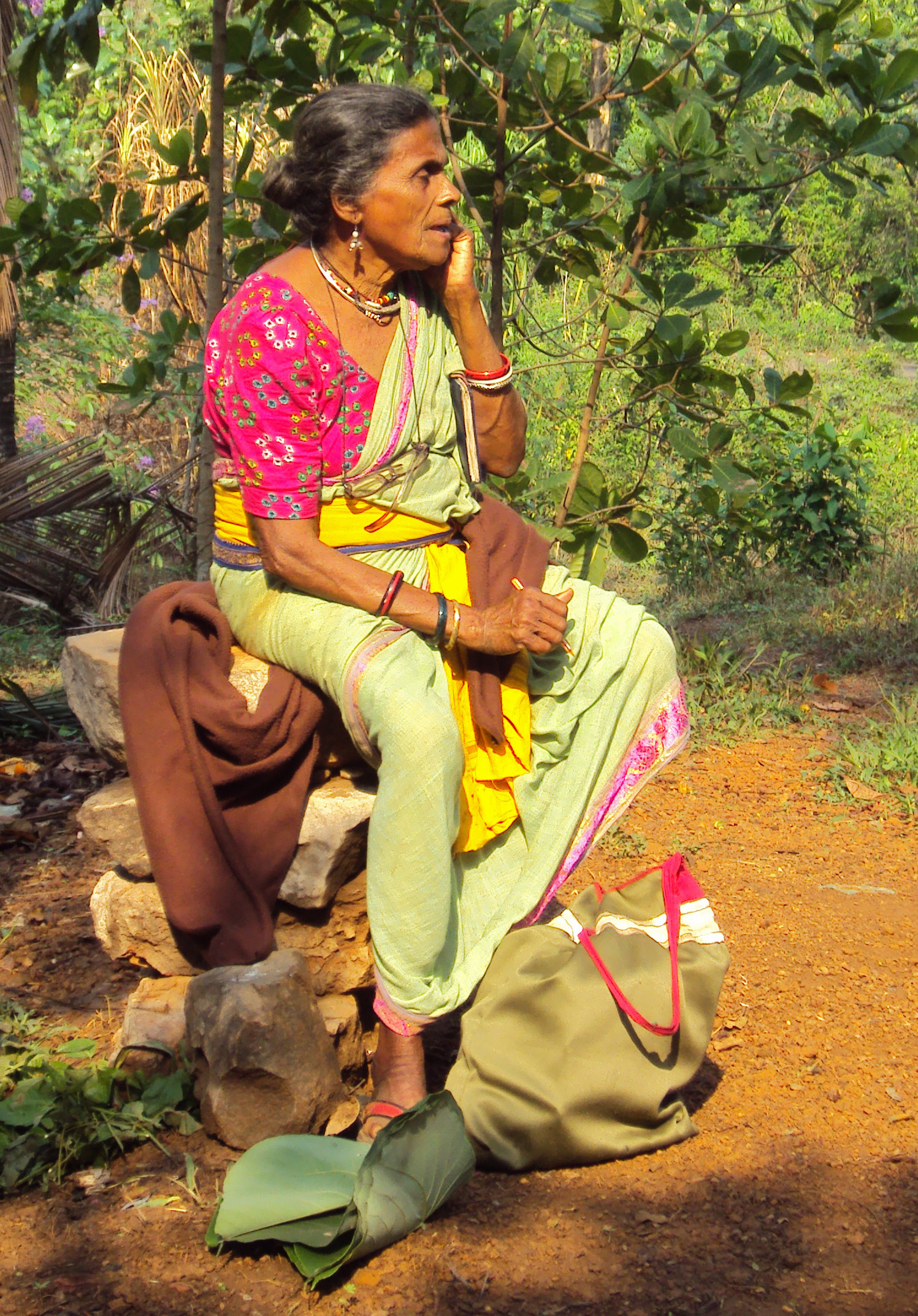
- Born: Mercy Mathew
- Education: University of Mumbai (Master of Social Work)
- Occupations: Social worker; Activist
- Known for: Tribal upliftment

Daya Bai (born Mercy Mathew) is an Indian social activist from Kerala, working among the tribals of central India. She lives in Barul village of Chhindwara district in Madhya Pradesh.

== Early life ==
Mercy Mathew hails from a prosperous Christian family in Pala, Kerala. She had a happy childhood with a strong faith in God. She left Pala, Kerala at the age of 16 to become a nun, and later gave up her habit, to work for the tribal population in the midlands of India.

== Social work ==
Daya has been delivering inspirational speeches, holding satyagrahas and campaigns to press local authorities to open schools and empower neglected villages in the interior and tribal Madhya Pradesh. She was associated with Narmada Bachao Andolan and the Chengara struggle, apart from her solo struggles representing the forest dwellers and villagers in Bihar, Haryana, Madhya Pradesh, Maharashtra and West Bengal. She also lent her services to the common folk in Bangladesh during the war there. Daya Bai, who practises the theology of liberation, settled down among the Gonds of Chhindwara district in Madhya Pradesh. She set up a school in the Barul village. Daya Bai teaches each village she visits how to take care of itself and then moves on to the next village.

She started the Swayam Sahayatha Group in the late 90s, as a tool for the eradication of poverty. This earned her the wrath of the middlemen, the money lenders and village chief. She asked female officers in the bank to use their position for the uplift of the downtrodden and the distressed poor.

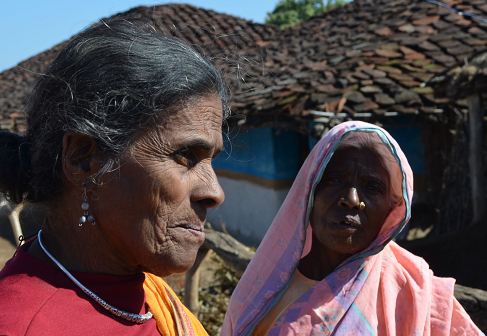

== Awards ==
Daya Bai received the Vanitha Woman of the Year Award in 2007. She was awarded with the Good Samaritan National Award (instituted by the Kottayam Social Service Society and Agape Movement, Chicago) in January 2012.

== Legacy ==
Ottayal or 'One Person,' is an hour-long documentary on Daya Bai by Shiny Jacob Benjamin. Nandita Das, the film personality, wrote a tribute to her in 2005, as the one inspiration of her life.

== Films ==
She did lead role in the 2018 Indian Malayalam-language film Kanthan – The Lover of Colour.
