= Chappad Phaad Ke =

2019 Indian comedy film

Chhappad Phaad Ke
- Release Poster
- Directed by: Sameer Hemant Joshi
- Produced by: Siddharth Anand Kumar; Saregama
- Starring: Vinay Pathak; Siddharth Menon; Ayesha Raza Mishra; Sheetal Thakur
- Music by: Prashant Pillai
- Production company: Yoodlee films
- Distributed by: Hotstar
- Release date: 18 October 2019
- Country: India
- Language: Hindi

Chhappad Phaad Ke is a 2019 Indian Hindi-language comedy film directed by Sameer Hemant Joshi, produced and bankrolled by Yoodlee films, film division of Saregama with Vinay Pathak, Siddharth Menon, Ayesha Raza Mishra and Sheetal Thakur in lead roles for Hotstar Specials. The story revolves around a middle class family, who is low on finances but high on morals and how their life takes a turn when they find a bag full of money. It began streaming exclusively on Hotstar from 18 October 2019.

== Synopsis ==
Chhappad Phaad Ke is satire on the consumerism and hypocrisy in people's lives set in the Maharashtrian family named Gupchups headed by Sharad Gupchup (Vinay Pathak) who is morally upright. The movie revolves around the family when they found an unaccounted cash of five crores going down with ethical crisis in determining the right thing to do with the family desires and aspirations coming in way.

== Cast ==
- Vinay Pathak as Sharad Atmaram Gupchup
- Siddharth Menon as Shubham Gupchup
- Ayesha Raza Mishra as Vaishali Gupchup
- Sheetal Thakur as Ketaki Gupchup
- Madhav Vaze as Atmaram Gupchup
- Mayur Khandge as Wasim Tamboli
- Sandeep Mehta as Pramod
- Anuj Sullere as Paresh
- Vineet Sharma as Ravi
- Anjali Atre as Varsha
- Shekhar Lohakare as Ramakant Ghuge
- Mahesh Kulkarni as Mahendale
- Prabhakar Daool as Auto Driver
- Vishwas Sahastrabuddhe as Dadasaheb MLA

== Production ==
The filming was done in early 2019 with Vinay Pathak joining the sets in March 2019 and wrapped filming in April 2019 at Pune.

== Soundtrack ==
Chhappad Phaad Ke

Soundtrack album by Prashant Pillai
- Released: 18 October 2019
- Recorded: 2018–19
- Genre: Feature film soundtrack
- Length: 3:44
- Label: Saregama

Songs and background score composed by Prashant Pillai.

Track listing
No.	Title	Lyrics	Music	Singer(s)	Length
1.	"Seedhe Raaste"	Prakhar-Pulkit	Prashant Pillai	Brijesh Shandilya	3:44

== Release ==
It started streaming exclusively on Hotstar from 18 October 2019 under its label Hotstar Specials marking it as the first film to stream exclusively on the platform.

== Reception ==
The film received a mediocre response from critics. Hina Beg writing for The Quint said, "Chhappad Phaad Ke is a twisted comedy that tries too hard and lost what the point which it is trying to make under the developments". Swetha writing for the Hindustan Times wrote, "Despite having lined up brilliant actors like Vinay Pathak and Ayesha Raza, debutant director Sameer Joshi offers a film that is neither entertaining nor hard-hitting." Prathyush writing for Film Companion said, "Hotstar’s first original film, is an over-referenced, under-articulated story of middle-class aspirations, greed, and political ambitions."
