= Oru Njayarazhcha =

2019 Malayalam Film

- Directed by: Shyamaprasad
- Written by: Shyamaprasad
- Produced by: Janardhanan Nair Saratchandran
- Starring: Murali Chand; Satheesh Kumar; Megha Thomas; Ramesh Verma; Sally Verma
- Cinematography: Manoj Narayan
- Edited by: Manmadan Aravind
- Music by: Shyamaprasad
- Release date: 13 December 2019
- Country: India
- Language: Malayalam

Oru Njayarazhcha (English: A Sunday) is a 2019 Malayalam language drama film written, composed and directed by Shyamaprasad. It features Murali Chand, Satheesh Kumar, Megha Thomas, Ramesh Verma, and Sally Verma in key roles. The film is based on two Bengali short stories written by Shirshendu Mukhopadhyay and Dibyendu Palit respectively.

It won the Kerala State Film Award for Second Best Film, along with the best editor for Aravind and best director for Shyamaprasad at the same ceremony. It was screened at the 2019 International Film Festival of Kerala and was released theatrically on 13 December 2019.

== Cast ==
- Murali Chand as Ajith
- Satheesh Kumar as Devdas
- Megha Thomas as Suja
- Sally Varma as Sujatha

== Reception ==
Neelima Menon of The News Minute called the film Shyamaprasad's "most unassuming work till date, with a short film tone, frames stark and ordinary and actors fresh and raw." CS Venkiteswaran of Film Companion wrote: "What makes viewing this film a riveting experience is the way in which the narrative meanders and weaves together events happening in one single day–A Sunday–in the life of two couples, all of them in love with someone outside marriage."
