= Sanal Kumar Sasidharan =

Indian poet, lawyer, and filmmaker

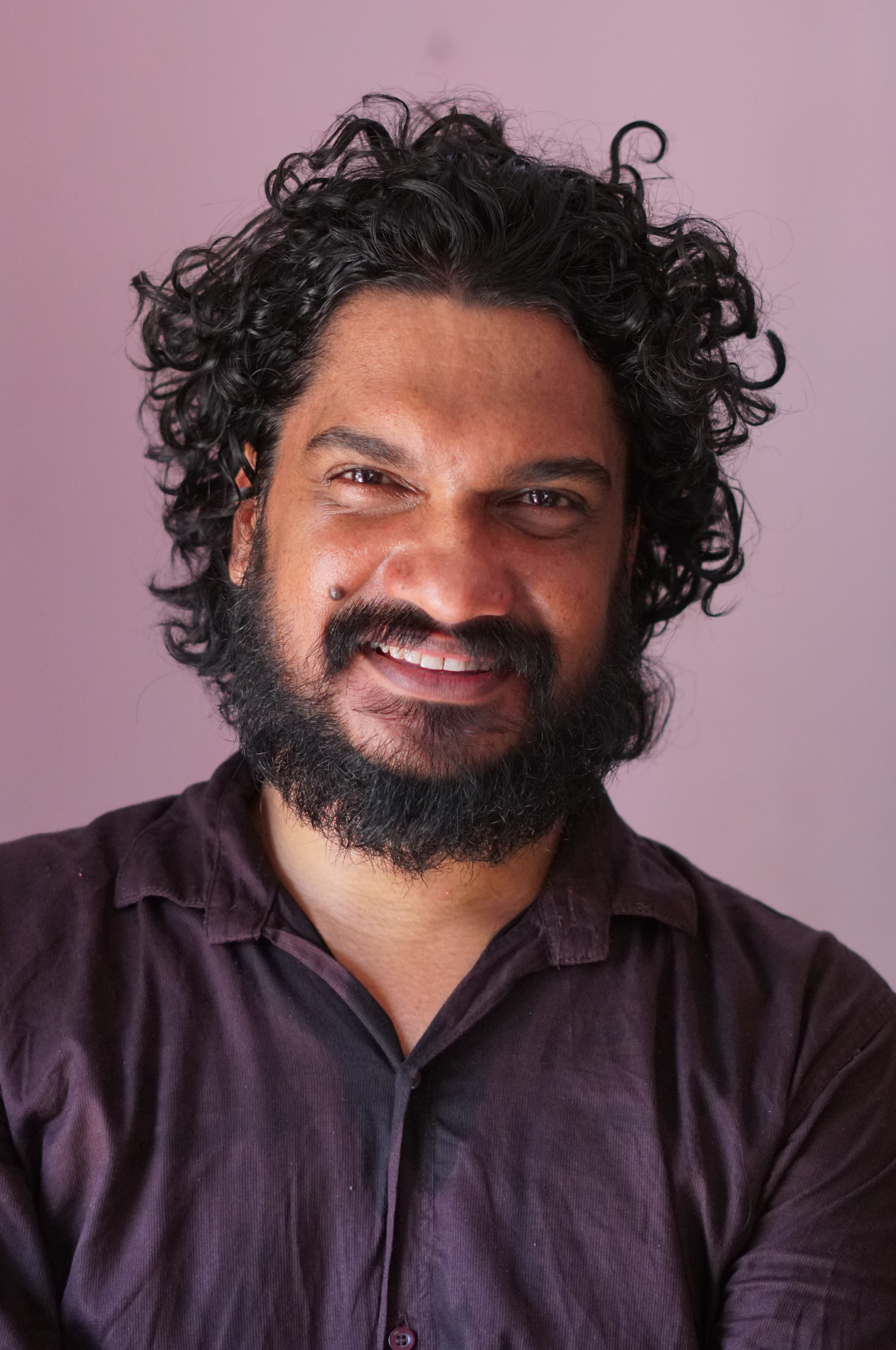
- Born: 8 April 1977 (age 49); Perumkadavila, Kerala, India
- Occupation: Filmmaker
- Years active: 2001–present
- Known for: film directing
- Notable work: Sexy Durga
- Spouse: Sreeja (m. 2002; div. 2022)
- Parents: Sasidharan; Sarojam

Sanal Kumar Sasidharan (born 8 April 1977) is an Indian poet, lawyer, and filmmaker.

== Personal life ==
Sanal Kumar Sasidharan was born to Sasidharan and Sarojam in Perumkadavila village, Thiruvananthapuram district, Kerala on 8 April 1977.

He graduated in Zoology from VTM NSS College Dhanuvachapuram, Thiruvananthapuram and law, then started his job as a lawyer. He was associated with Akhil Bharatiya Vidyarthi Parishad (ABVP), a student organization associated with the Bharatiya Janata Party, and was the unit secretary of the ABVP during his days at the Law College. He later left ABVP over political differences, and became a critic of the BJP-controlled Central government.

In 2001, he formed a film society, Kazhcha Chalachithra Vedi with his colleagues, for making independent movies through crowd funding. He has started his film making journey by directing three short films and one feature film through crowdfunding. Later on, he directed six more critically acclaimed feature films and a documentary. He was awarded the Best Director in the Kerala State Film Awards 2014. He was awarded the Tiger Award in the International Film Festival Rotterdam for his film Sexy Durga.

== Film career ==
His film career started in 2000 as an art assistant in the Malayalam film Mankolangal. In 2001, he made his first short film Wonder World, with cinematography by Sunny Joseph, editing by Beena Paul and production by Kazhcha Chalachithra Vedi through crowd funding. In 2008 he directed Parole produced by a group of friends from Malayalam blog community. His third short film Frog, won a Kerala State Television Award for best short film in 2008.

In 2014 Kazhcha Chalachithra Vedi produced his first feature-length movie Oraalppokkam for which he had been awarded the Best Director. The film has got fipresci and Network for the Promotion of Asian Cinema awards for the best Malayalam film in the International Film Festival of Kerala 2014. He has also bagged the Kerala State Film Award for Best Director in 2014.

His second movie Ozhivudivasathe Kali (An Off-Day Game), which was completed in 2015 was officially selected for the International Film Festival of Kerala and Mumbai Film Festival. It was also awarded the Kerala State Film Awards, best film in 2015. The film was in the Film Basar Recommends in the Film Basar in Goa. His next film after Sexy Durga, Unmadiyude Maranam produced in 2018 has not been censored and released. The film was not screened in any major film festivals.

His next feature film Chola premiered at the 76th Venice International Film Festival in the Orizzonti Competition section. The main actors, Nimisha Sajayan has received the Kerala State Film Award for Best Actress and actor Joju George has won the Kerala State Film Award for Best Character Actor and Kerala State Film Award – Special Mention for Direction and Sound design to Sanal Kumar Sasidharan.

His sixth feature film project Ah'r (Kayattam), announced in 2019 has been noted for the presence of acclaimed Malayalam actress Manju Warrier as protagonist and a co-producer. The film was premiered in the Busan International Film Festival in the year 2020 and nominated for Kim Jiseok Award. The film has also been screened in the International Film Festival of Kerala in 2021 under the Malayalam Cinema Today category. Kayattam has also competed in the Indian Film Festival of Melbourne in August 2021 and Sanal Kumar Sasidharan was awarde the first "Disruptor in Cinema Award". The film was entirely shot using iPhone camera in the Himalayan peaks. Later the film also won the Kerala State Film Award for Best Cinematography to its cinematographer Chandru Selvaraj and coulourist Liju Prabhakar for the excellence in colour grading in the 51st Kerala State Film Awards.

He has made another feature film immediately after Kayattam with Tovino Thomas as hero titled, Vazhakku. Tovino Thomas has co-produced the film along with Sanal Kumar Sasidharan. The film premiered in the International Film Festival of South Asia - Seoul 2022 under the theme of “Journey to South Asia through the Movie”. The film has also been screened in the International Film Festival of Kerala in the Malayalam Cinema Today section in December 2022 and received rave reviews. Huge audience influx to watch Vazhakk caused the delegates to protest in front of the theatre alleging that many who had not reserved seats through prior online booking were allowed to attend the theatre

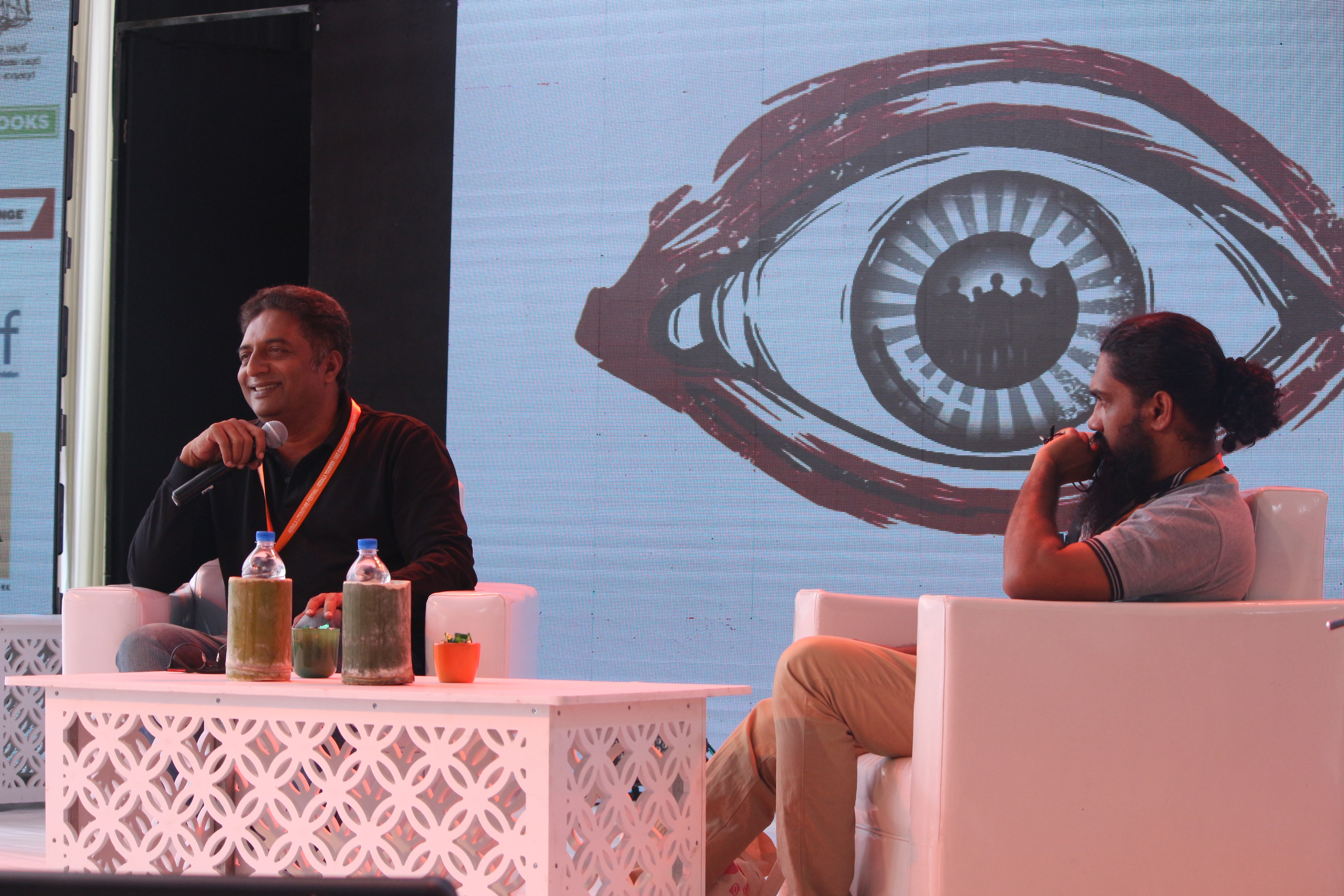
Prakash Raj with Sanal Kumar Sasidharan at KLF 18

=== International recognition ===
Sanal's 2017 film Sexy Durga, was renamed as S Durga following controversy of the original title which was banned by the Indian Central Board of Film Certification. The film S Durga (Sexy Durga), received the Hivos Tiger Award at the International Film Festival Rotterdam 2017, making it the first ever Indian film win this award. The film, cinematographed by Prathap Joseph also has won eight more international awards including the Award for Professional Achievement in the Tarkovsky Film Festival in Russia for the excellence in cinematography, the Golden Apricot Award in the International Feature Competition category in Yerevan International Film Festival 2017, Best International Feature Narrative in Guanajuato International Film Festival, Mexico Expresión en Corto International Film Festival 2017, Best International Feature award Reflet d’Or in the Geneva International Film Festival, The Young Jury award and a Special mention from the official Jury in the 53rd Pesaro Film Festival in Italy, Jury Mention for Direction and Original Music track in Cinema Jove - International Film Festival of Valencia, Spain, Special Jury mention in the 19th Mumbai Academy of Moving Image (MAMI). The work in progress project of the film had also received NFDC FILM BAZAAR – DI Award 2016. The film faced huge controversy making headlines following the Ministry of Information and Broadcasting (India) denying permission to screen the film in the International Film Festival of India after Jury selection, due to the title.

== Filmography ==
Year	Title	Notes
2001	Athisayalokam	Short film Crowd funded by Kazhcha Chalachithra Vedi
2008	Parole	Short film Blog cinema from Malayalam blogosphere
2012	Frog	Short film Awarded as the best short film in the Kerala State Television Awards 2012
2014	Oraalppokkam	First feature film First online crowd funded feature film in Malayalam
2015	Ozhivudivasathe Kali	Feature film 2015 Kerala State Film Award for Best Film
2017	Sexy Durga	Feature film 2017 Hivos Tiger Award International Film Festival Rotterdam
2018	Unmadiyude Maranam	Feature film
2019	Chola	Feature film 2019 Orizonti Competition Venice Film Festival
2020	Ah'r Kayattam	Feature film 2020 Nomination for Kim Jiseok Award at the Busan International Film Festival
2021	Vazhakku	Feature film Premiered in the IFFSA-SEOL and officially selected in the International Film Festival of Kerala

== Awards ==
- Hivos Tiger Award International Film Festival Rotterdam in 2017
- Golden Apricot Award Yerevan International Film Festival in 2017
- Award for the Best International Feature in the Expresión en Corto International Film Festival/Guanajuato International Film Festival, Mexico
- Disruptor Award Indian Film Festival of Melbourne in 2021 for the film Kayattam
- Special Jury Award For Direction in Valencia International Film Festival - Cinema Jove, in 2017
- Special Jury mention for best film scoring for Sexy Durga for music by Basil Joseph in Valencia International Film Festival - Cinema Jove, in 2017
- Young Jury Award in the Pesaro International Film Festival2017 for Sexy Durga
- Special Jury Mention in the Pesaro International Film Festival 2017 for Sexy Durga
- Award for professional Achievement - Excellence in cinematography for Sexy Durga in the Tarkovsky Zerkalo International Film Festival, Russia
- Kerala State Film Award for Best Film in the 2015 Kerala State Film Awards
- Best Director award in the 2014 Kerala State Film Awards
- Fipresci Award for Oraalppokkam in the 19th International Film Festival of Kerala
- Fipresci Award for Ozhivudivasathe Kali in the 20th International Film Festival of Kerala
- Special Jury Mention in the Jio MAMI Mumbai film festival Mumbai Academy of the Moving Image 2017 for Sexy Durga
- Special Jury Mention in the 49th Kerala State Film Awards for Direction for Chola (film) in the year 2019
- Special Jury Mention in the 49th Kerala State Film Awards for sound design for Chola (film) in the year 2019
- Special Jury award in the John Abraham Awards 2014
- Special Jury mention in the Aravindan Puraskaram 2014
- Mohan Raghavan award Best director 2014
