= Kanpuriye =

2019 Indian comedy film

- Release Poster
- Directed by: Ashish Aryan
- Screenplay by: Ashish Aryan
- Produced by: Siddharth Anand Kumar; Saregama
- Starring: Aparshakti Khurana; Divyenndu; Harsh Mayar; Vijay Raaz; Rajshri Deshpande; Harshita Gaur
- Cinematography: Akshay Singh
- Edited by: Manik Dawar
- Music by: Songs: Indian Ocean; Rachita Arora; Anshuman Mukherjee; Score: Dhrendra Mulkarwar; Mangesh Dhakde
- Production company: Yoodlee films
- Distributed by: Hotstar
- Release date: 25 October 2019
- Country: India
- Language: Hindi

Kanpuriye is a 2019 Indian Hindi-language anthology film directed by Ashish Aryan, produced and bankrolled by Yoodlee films, film division of Saregama with Aparshakti Khurana, Divyenndu, Harsh Mayar, Vijay Raaz, Rajshri Deshpande and Harshita Gaur. It was released on Hotstar on 25 October 2019.

== Premise ==
The film follows three Kanpur locals each trying to achieve something in life. Jaitun (Aparshakti) works in a leather factory dreaming to marry love of his life Bulbul (Harshita). Jagnu (Harsh) caught in between his dream and his father's plan for him. Vijay (Divyenndu) a fresh law graduate who was unable to pursue his dream job because of impending Court case.

== Cast ==
- Aparshakti Khurana as Jaitun Mishra
- Divyendu Sharma as Vijay Dinanath Chauhan
- Harsh Mayar as Jugnu Lampat
- Vijay Raaz as Lampat Harami
- Rajshri Deshpande as Kohinoor
- Harshita Gaur as Bulbul Tiwari
- Bhupesh Pandya as Peshkar
- Vani Sood as Prem Kumari
- Chittaranjan Tripathy as Mohan Mishra

== Production ==
The development of the film started in 2018. Casting was carried in December 2018 various supporting characters. Filming started in early February 2019 with Aparshakti Khurana and Divyenndu.

== Release ==
Trailer of the film was released on 23 October 2019. The film released on Hotstar under Hotstar Specials label on October 25, 2019.
