= Collar Bomb =

- Release Poster
- Directed by: Dnyanesh Zoting
- Written by: Nikhil Nair
- Produced by: Siddharth Anand Kumar; Vikram Mehra
- Starring: Jimmy Sheirgill; Sparsh Srivastav; Rajshri Deshpande; Asha Negi; Ajit Singh Palawat; Naman Jain
- Cinematography: Jitan Harmeet Singh
- Edited by: Anurodh Gusain; Praful Sawant
- Music by: Anshuman Mukherjee
- Production company: Yoodlee films
- Distributed by: Disney+ Hotstar
- Release date: 9 July 2021
- Running time: 86 minutes
- Country: India
- Language: Hindi

Collar Bomb is a 2021 Indian Hindi-language action thriller film directed by Dnyanesh Zoting and starring Jimmy Sheirgill. It was released digitally on Disney+ Hotstar.

== Premise ==
A glorified cop's life is thrown into chaos as he is forced to commit a series of crimes before a suicide bomber blows up a school. As he races against time, he's confronted by an evil that is hell-bent on striking raw, primal terror.

== Cast ==
- Jimmy Sheirgill as SHO Manoj Hesi
- Sparsh Srivastav as Shoeb Ali
- Rajshri Deshpande as Rita
- Asha Negi as ASI Sumitra Joshi
- Ajit Singh Palawat as Ratan Negi
- Naman Jain as Akshay Hesi
- Ajay Purkar as Commander Bhaskar Chandra
- Shashi Bhushan as Inspector Mohan Rawat
- Ambarish Deshpande as Deputy Commandant Satyan
- Vidushi Mehra as Sarah Fernandes
- Suman Singh as Peter Fernandes
- Shantanu Bhamare

== Reception ==
Jyoti Kanyal of India Today gave the film a negative review and stating, "Dnyanesh Zoting's Collar Bomb is a disappointing thriller, which is devoid of logic and depth. Watch it if you don't have much else to do." Anna M.M. Vetticad of Firstpost gave the film 1.75 out of 5 stars and expressing, "Will the Nikhil Nair who wrote her with such finesse and the Dnyanesh Zoting who directed her with such confidence please raise their hands and tell us what went wrong with the rest of Collar Bomb?" Archika Khurana of Times of India gave the film 3.5 out of 5 stars and stated, "As Jimmy Sheirgill says in the end, “Life is a chain that is built from the decisions we make.” This perfectly summing up this 87-minute riveting drama. It will have you hooked to your seat the entire time."

Pankaj Shukla of Amar Ujala gave the film 2.5 out of 5 stars and stated, "The film is fine for passing the time on weekends but its director Dnyanesh Zoting has raised a hope that if given a chance, he will definitely do a big bang." Russel D'Silva of BollywoodLife gave the film 3 out of 5 stars and stated, "Collar Bomb is a quite a taut, tight thriller for three quarters of the way until the final quarter ergo the climax almost brings everything crashing down. Thankfully, Jimmy Sheirgill and surprise package Asha Negi prevent the movie from ending with too sour an aftertaste." Madhuri V of Filmibeat gave the film 2.5 out of 5 stars and stated, "The cop thriller keeps you majorly hooked until you foresee the climax from a distance. Later, when the big reveal is made, it simply fails to make a loud blast."
