= Chola (film) =

2019 Indian Malayalam-language psychological drama film

- Poster of the film Chola
- Directed by: Sanal Kumar Sasidharan
- Screenplay by: K V Manikandan; Sanal Kumar Sasidharan
- Produced by: Joju George
- Starring: Nimisha Sajayan; Joju George; Akhil Viswanath
- Cinematography: Ajith Aacharya
- Edited by: Sanal Kumar Sasidharan
- Music by: Basil C J
- Production company: Appu Pathu Pappu Production House
- Distributed by: Showbiz Studios
- Release dates: 2 September 2019 (Venice); 6 December 2019 (India)
- Running time: 116 minutes
- Country: India
- Language: Malayalam

Chola (English: Shadow of Water) is a 2019 Indian Malayalam-language psychological drama film directed by Sanal Kumar Sasidharan and produced by Joju George, and co-produced by Shaji Mathew and Aruna Mathew. The film stars Joju George, Nimisha Sajayan and Akhil Viswanath.

== Plot ==
An adolescent school girl and her teenage lover meet across at the village by dawn to set out for a trip to the town. Infuriated by the presence of a stranger along with the boy, she expresses her hesitance. However, he comforts and convinces her that the stranger will leave them at the bus stop and the trio begins their journey. Passing through the hilly peripheral suburbs of Kerala, they reach out at the heart of the city. Tall buildings to shopping precinct, the girl is astounded and excited. Resuming their journey back in the evening, things take a wild turn, later unfolding inevitable intriguing incidents.

== Cast ==
- Nimisha Sajayan as Janaki
- Joju George as Boss
- Akhil Viswanath as Janaki's lover

== Festivals ==
- Venice International Film Festival - Orizonti Competition
- Geneva International Film Festival - International Feature Competition
- Tokyo Filmex - International Competition
