= Culture of Thiruvananthapuram =

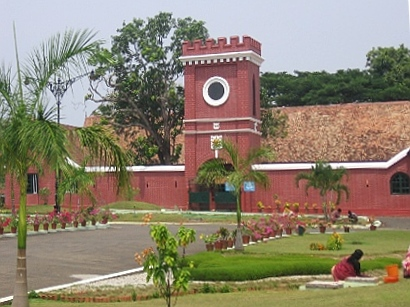
The Legislative Museum

The city of Thiruvananthapuram has been the centre of cultural activities of Kerala (India) from the time it was made capital of Travancore in 1745. The capital city is a major intellectual and artistic center. The Thiruvananthapuram Museum and Thiruvananthapuram Zoo were started during the reign of Swathi Thirunal (1813–1847) and are one of the oldest of their kind in India. The city's libraries include the Thiruvananthapuram Public library, which was started in 1829. The Swathi Thirunal College of Music and 'College of fine arts' are the leading institutions related to music and arts.

== Literature ==
Many great poets and men of letters from ancient times belonged to Thiruvananthapuram. One such poet was Ayyipillai Asan (15th or 16th Century AD) of Avaaduthura near Kovalam. He wrote his work Ramakadhapattu, which represents a stage in the evolution of the southern dialect of Malayalam. Two most outstanding poets patronized by the royal family of Travancore were Unnayi Variyar and Kunchan Nambiar. The reign of Maharaja Swathi Thirunal (1813–1846), the royal composer, saw the golden age of Carnatic music in Kerala. The contribution of Swathi Thirunal in the realm of music has enriched even the cultural heritage of India. Irayimman Thampi (1782–1856), a contemporary of Maharaja Swathi Thirunal, was another composer of great originality and deep learning. Vidwan Raja Raja Varma Koithampuran was also a scholar and poet who belonged to this period.

Thiruvananthapuram witnessed a cultural renaissance in twentieth century. Kerala Varma Valiakoi Thampuran (1845–1914), who spent a major part of his life in Thiruvananthapuram, translated Kalidasa's Abhijñānaśākuntalam into Malayalam which won him the title of Kerala Kalidasa . He is also regarded as the father of modern Malayalam prose.

The contributions of A. R. Raja Raja Varma (1863–1918), known as "Kerala Panini", marked an important stage in the development of Malayalam literature. Another notable writer is C. V. Raman Pillai (1858–1922), who was a novelist par excellence. Mahakavi Kumaran Asan (1873–1924) and Mahakavi Ulloor S. Parameswara Iyer (1877–1949) were the two outstanding poets from Thiruvananthapuram. Kumaran Asan was the true representative of the cultural renaissance. Ulloor was not only a poet, but also a scholar, researcher and historian.

Shabdatharavali, the comprehensive dictionary in Malayalam was written by Sreekanteswaram Padmanabha Pillai who hailed from here. The two all-time great social reformers in Kerala Narayana Guru and Chattampi Swamikal also were born here. They contributed much to the Malayalam literature through their books.

Thiruvananthapuram hosts the literary festival known as Kovalam Literary Festival. Started from 2008, this literary festival is held every year on October. Although the event aims in boosting the literature and arts it has an eye on the tourism prospectus of the state.

Thiruvananthapuram has hosted a festival known as "Hays Literary Festival" since 2010. This literary festival is held every year on November/December. Although the event aims in boosting the literature and arts it has an eye on the tourism prospectus of the state.

== Poetry ==
Two prominent English poetry journals are based out of Thiruvananthapuram. Both host regular and annual meetups and gatherings.

== Music/dance ==
The Swathi Thirunal College of Music and 'College of fine arts' are the leading institutions related to music and arts. The 75-day-long Soorya India Festival, is a major festival in India today. The Bach Festival, now in its 12th edition, is held every year by musician Julian Clef in the YMCA Hall Trivandrum Metal /Indie Rock Avial, Chaos

== Sports ==
Facilities for sports are the best in Kerala. There are several public swimming pools in and around the city, prominent among them being the International class aquatic center in Pirappancode. Tennis coaching can be obtained at Trivandrum Tennis Club

Adventure sports. Varkala near Thiruvananthapuram is known for adventure activities like paragliding etc. Kovalam hosts one of India's oldest surfing enclaves and also one of the first exclusive surf shops in India. Several companies offer hiking, trekking, paintball and other activities. Prominent among them are XtremE SportZ.

== European cultural attaches and embassies ==
Thiruvananthapuram has the best scope for international multicultural activity in Kerala, due to the cultural promotion centers of various countries present since the 1970s.

Goethe Zentrum - Thiruvananthapuram's relation with Germany goes back to Basel missionary Hermann Gundert, who in a pivotal meeting with the Travancore Maharajah decided to stay back in Kerala. He wrote the first formal dictionary of sorts of Malayalam thus playing a pivotal role in the state's education and language. His influence on his grandson Hermann Hesse, the nobel laureate, was evident in the latter's writings. Goethe Zentrum hosts language classes, European and Swiss cultural exchange programs and film festivals.

Alliance Francaise is an international organization that aims to promote French language and culture around the world. Alliance Francaise, Thiruvananthapuram established in the early 1980s, hosts language classes, cultural exchange programs, film festivals and other cultural events.

Russian Cultural Centre (Gorky Bhavan) established in Thiruvananthapuram in the early 1970s is an extension of the Russian Embassy and promotes Russian culture. The Pushkin Institute of Language offers crash courses, certificate and diploma courses in Russian. Tchaikovsky music school, Alekhin chess club, Chekhov drama club and a film forum and other fora operate from there. The center has brought several Russian dance troupes and artists to the city and organized Russian food and cultural festivals, choir music and the like.

Thiruvananthapuram also hosts the consulates of Maldives, United Arab Emirates and Sri Lanka.

== Magic ==
India's first and only magic academy, run by Merlin award-winning magician Gopinath Muthukad is situated in Thiruvananthapuram. The Magic Academy Research Centre (MARC), the only centre of excellence in magical art, is situated in the government owned KINFRA Film and Video Park away from the hustle and bustle of the city. A Magic Planet was recently announced and inaugurated with staging of the bullet biting trick.

== Painting and sculpture ==
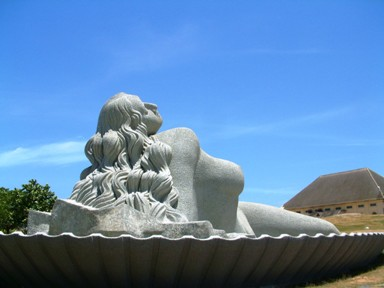
Giant Statue of Mermaid at Shankumugham Beach

Contributions of Thiruvananthapuram to painting are immense. The earliest of murals that can be attributed to the Kerala tradition are found in a small cave-shrine at Thirunandikkara in south Travancore, now a part of Tamil Nadu. The themes of these murals are evidently drawn from Hindu lore, but the style closely resembles the Buddhist tradition. These are believed to belong to the 9th century. Siva, Parvathi and Ganapathi are among the figures represented. Sri Padmanabhaswamy temple at Thiruvananthapuram has several murals, which belongs to the 18th century. The paintings at Koikal Temple at Attingal bear close resemblance to those in the Padmanabha Swami Temple, which are examples of 16th century Kerala paintings. Raja Ravi Varma (1848–1905), an illustrious painter of the district, stands at the cross-roads of Indian art history. Ravi Varma's contribution to Indian painting is substantial and singular. He is officially regarded as a prince among painters and painter among princes by the Kerala government. Some of the most paintings of Raja Ravi Varma are preserved in the Sri Chitra Art Gallery. The Sri Padmanabha Swami Temple at Thiruvananthapuram has preserved the relics of the best traditions of stone sculpture in the State.

Thiruvananthapuram city has several statues. The statues of freedom fighters, political leaders, rulers of Travancore are common in the city. There are also statues in other categories such as animals, artists, etc.

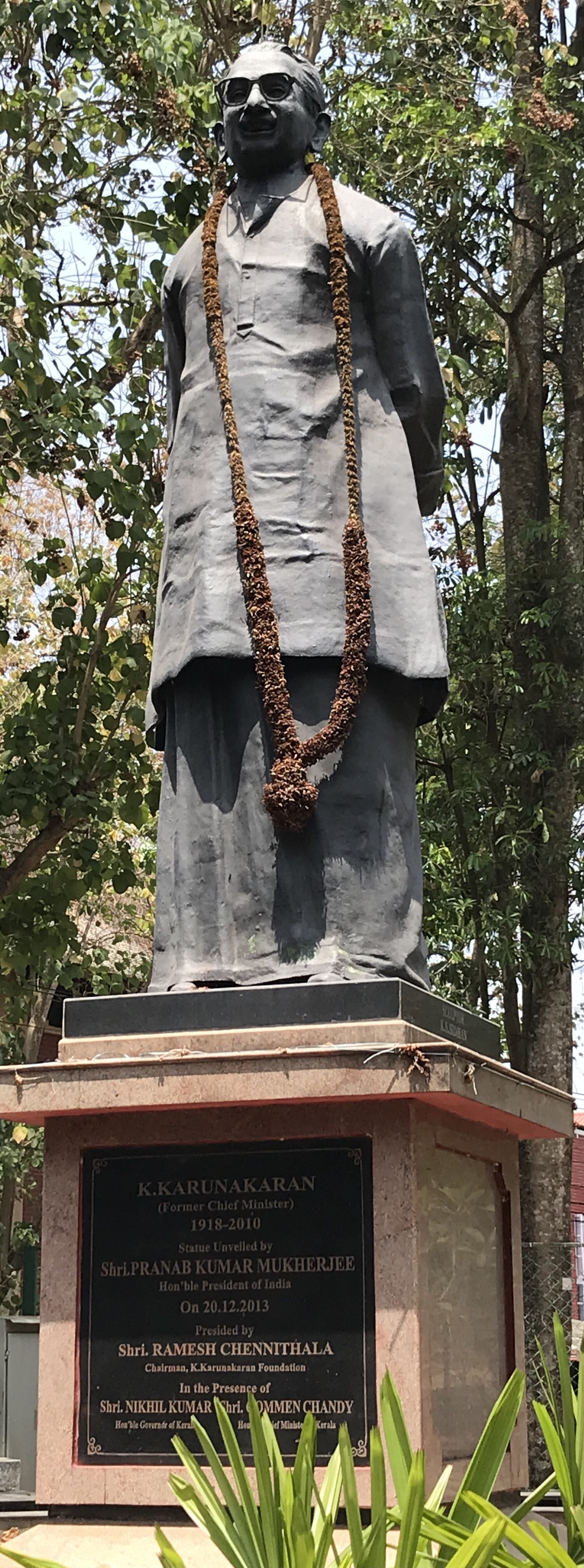
Statue of former Kerala Chief Minister K. Karunakaran in Thiruvananthapuram

== Street shows and street art ==
Manaveeyam Veedhi is a street in Vellayambalam which hosts street plays and music shows. The walls along the street are also open to street art and has featured paintings from different artists including Artist Namboothiri.

== Film industry ==
The city is home to animation companies like Toonz Media Group and Tata Elxsi Ltd. The Kinfra Film and Video Park is located near Technopark and is an advanced film and animation production facilities in India.

The Kerala State Film Development Corporation (KSFDC), which was established in 1975 by the Government of Kerala, accelerated this re-planting. As a result, many studios and related industries started popping up in and around Thiruvananthapuram.

The first Malayalam feature film, Vigathakumaran directed by J. C. Daniel was released in Thiruvananthapuram. J. C. Daniel is considered as the father of Malayalam film industry. He also established the first film studio of Kerala, the Travancore National Pictures at Thiruvananthapuram in 1926. The International Film Festival of Kerala (IFFK), which is held every year in December is one of Asia's largest film festival in terms of viewer participation. In addition to various film festivals, the presence of film certification body like the Central Board of Film Certification's regional office, many movie studios and production facilities like the Uma Studio, Chitranjali Studio, Merryland Studio, Kinfra Film and Video Park and Vismayas Max contributed to the growth of Thiruvananthapuram as a centre of cinema.

Kerala State Film Development Corporation (KSFDC) was established in 1975 with the objective of promoting the Malayalam film industry and for nurturing it in the state. As a result, many studios and related industries started to grow up in and around Thiruvananthapuram. The studio Merryland was opened in 1951 and Chithranjali in 1980s. Leading firms like Prasad Film Labs expanded their operations to Thiruvananthapuram.

With the arrival of animation companies like Toonz India Ltd and Tata Elxsi, the film industry saw increased growth. The Kinfra Film and Video Park is located near Technopark and is one of the most advanced film and animation production facilities in India. Kerala State Chalachitra Academy was founded in 1998 for the promotion of Cinema as a means of cultural expression.

Thiruvananthapuram city has the most theatres of any city in Kerala, all of which are within a 2 km radius. There are 19 A-Class theatres. Areisplex sl cinema audi-1 is the largest theatre in the state with a seating capacity more than 1300. Kerala State Chalachitra Academy, founded in 1998, is based at Thiruvananthapuram. The city holds the maximum number of theatres in the state, all within a radius of 3 km.

== Cuisine and festivals ==
The city comes to a festive mood during the festival season of Onam in August/September, and during the tourist season later in the year. The state government conducts the tourism week celebrations every year during Onam with cultural events taking place at various centers in the city. Kanakakkunnu Palace grounds are the venue for the main official events organized by the state government. An elephant procession is held at the entrance of Kanakakkunnu and a wide range of exhibitions of various sporty rides and various cultural programs are hosted within the palace grounds.

Apart from this, there are cultural festivals organized throughout the year by both government and non-government organizations. The 75-day annual Soorya Festival, is one of such prominent event in the city. This festival is acclaimed as the longest running cultural festival in the world and covers literature, movies, dance, music, theatre and folk arts. Other major annual cultural festivals are week long Swathi Music Festival held in January, 9-day-long Navaratri Music fete held in September/October, 10-day-long Nishagandhi Dance and Music show, 5-day-long Nishagandhi Musical nights, International Film Festival of Kerala, etc.

The other major events include the annual flower show, the Attukal Pongala, the Aaraat of Padmanabha Swamy Temple, the Beemapally Uroos, Vettucaud Perunaal, etc.

The general cuisine of the people is Keralite cuisine, which is generally characterised by an abundance of coconut and spices. Other South Indian cuisines, as well as Chinese and North Indian cuisines are popular. Arabian, Thai and branded fast food joints are also patronised.
