= P. K. Pokker =

Indian writer (born 1954)

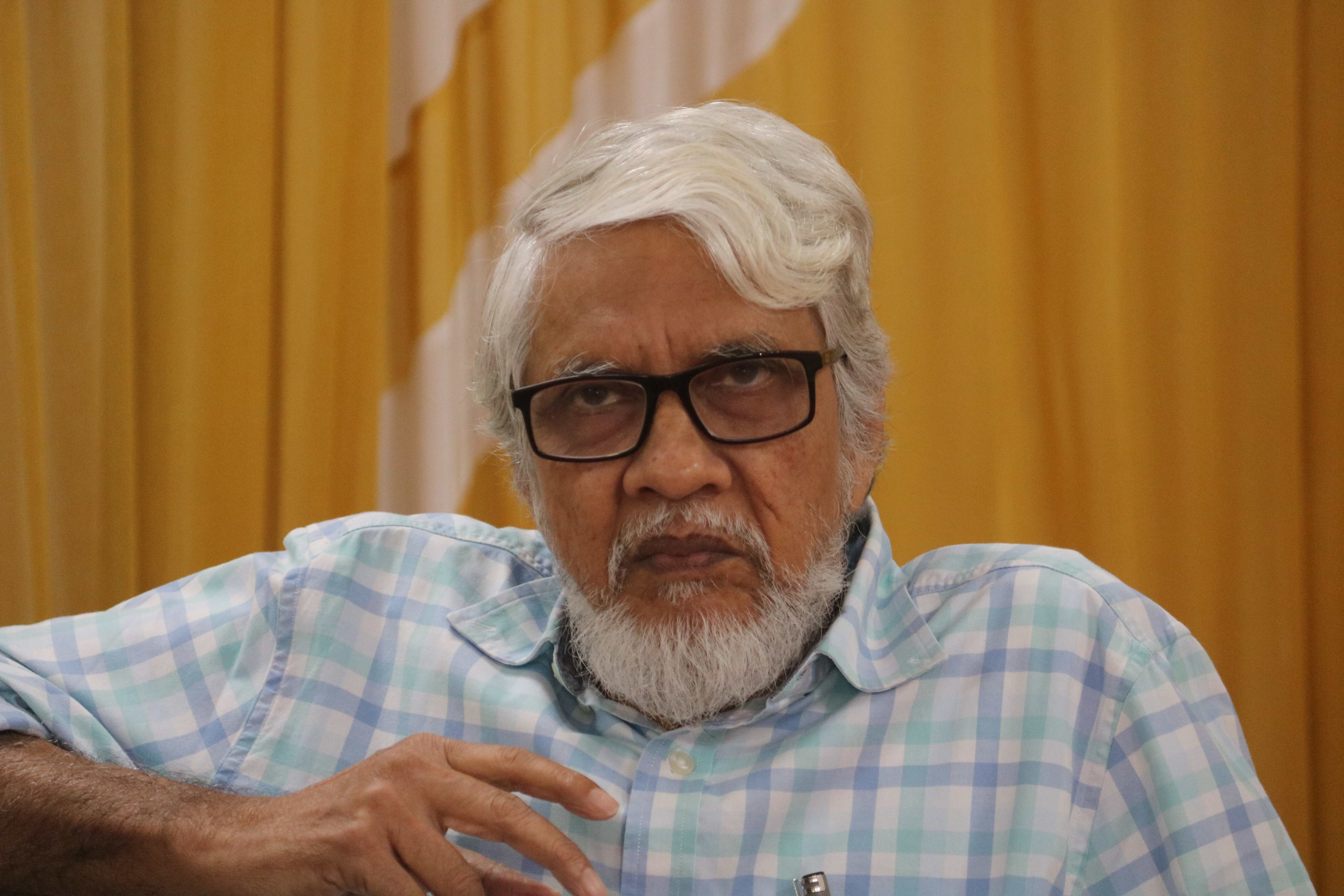
- P.K Pokker in 2025
- Born: 1 June 1954 (age 71); Kozhikode, Kerala, India
- Occupation: Academic
- Spouse: Remla C K
- Children: 2

Philosophical work
- School: Marxism
- Main interests: Postmodernism, philosophy, critique of fascism, cultural studies
- Notable ideas: Marxist reading of postmodern trends in Kerala. Identity, class and gender.
- Website: www.pkpokker.com

P. K. Pokker (born 1 June 1954) is an Indian academic, who works as the Professor of Philosophy in Calicut University. He is the former director of State Institute of Languages, Keralabhasha Institute. Then, from 1 July 2015 to July 2017 he became Senior Fellow of Indian Council of Philosophical Research (ICPR)New Delhi, and Visiting Professor Vaikom Muhammed Basheer Chair, Calicut University from 2018 to 2021 February. Now he is Dean of Social Sciences, Thunjathezhuthachan Malayalam University, Tirur, Kerala. The first book, Aadhunikotharathayude Keraleeya Parisaram (Postmodernism in the context of Kerala) published in 1996 got wider attention in Kerala and won Thayat award for literary criticism in 1997. In 2007 he got Kerala Sahithya academy award for scholarly literature. In 2023 Kerala sahitya academy conferred Vilasini award for his study of Vaikom Muhammad Basheer. In the first book an attempt was made to reveal the role of new theoretical approaches especially in understanding the cultural scenario of the world after cold-war. He has attended many national and international seminars. In academics he produced a number of PhDs and M.Phil scholars. There are about forty research articles and a good number of News paper- News weekly articles at his credit.

== List of works ==
Some of Pokker's works include:

Books in Malayalam

- Aadhunikotharathayude Keraleeya Parisaram (Postmodernism in Kerala context)
- Keraleeyathayude Varthamam
- Derrida, Apanirmanathinte Darshanikan (Derrida, Philosopher of Deconstruction)
- Varnabhedangal Padabhedangal
- Mampuram Fasal Pookoya Thangal (Ed. with Dr. K. K. N. Kurup)
- Adhiniveshavum Cheruthunilpum
- Kadammanitta: Kaviyum Jeevithavum (Ed.)
- Swathwa Rashtreeyam (Identity Politics)
- Nava Marxisavum Prachanna Marxisavum (Neo-Marxism and Pseudo Marxism)
- Gramsci: Jail Kurippukal (Gramsci: Prison Notebooks, Ed. with an introduction)
- Pratyayashastram (Ideology, Ed. with an introduction)
- Bhavanayum Bhavukatvavum
- Purogamanathinte Marunna Pariprekshyam (Changing Perspective of Progress)
- E.M.S-um Aadhunika Keralavum (E. M. S. and modern Kerala)
- Indian Sociology
- Souhrudavum Thathva chinthayum

Books in English

- Creativity and Freedom: A Marxian Perspective
- Philosophy and Culture: Dismantling Hegemony
- Nationalism and Multiculturalism in India

Articles in English

- "Dalit: A Postmodern Cultural Phenomenon"
- "An Experiment with Marxism"
- "Globalization and Postmodernism"

== Awards ==
- Abu Dhabi Sakthi Award for Literary Criticism (Thayat Sankaran Award) in 1996
- Kerala Sahitya Akademi Award for Scholarly Literature in 2009 for Swathva Rashtreeyam

== In popular culture ==
Pokker has been featured in the 2021 documentary Dreaming of Words on the life and work of Njattyela Sreedharan.
