= Kerala Industrial Infrastructure Development Corporation =

Kerala Industrial Infrastructure Development Corporation (KINFRA) is a government agency under the government of the Indian state of Kerala headquartered in Thiruvananthapuram. It undertakes development of industrial estates to nurture industrialization in the state. Dr. G. C. Gopala Pillai, the former CMD of FACT, Ernakulam was at its helm for the first 12 years and was instrumental in the growth of KINFRA as an industrial facilitator in the state of Kerala. It is now led by S. Ramnath, a protégé of Dr. Pillai.

KINFRA plans to set up an industrial park, Kera Park, at Kodakara in Thrissur district. Land acquisition is under way, and the company is awaiting clearances.

Since its inception, KINFRA has mainly identified itself with land acquisition and development of industrial infrastructure in the form of parks, townships and zones. With the objective of boosting industrial growth, KINFRA has promoted the concept of theme parks, which have been set up for the exclusive growth and development of chosen and specified industrial sectors. Some of the theme parks already implemented by KINFRA include food processing parks, an apparel park, a film and video park, an export promotion industrial park, an information technology and electronics park as well as a herbal and ayurveda park.

The government has given special emphasis to promotion of the food processing industry due to the enormous development potential in the sector. In line with this policy, two food processing parks have already been set up by KINFRA, one at Kakkanchery in Malappuram district and the other at Mazhuvannur in Ernakulam district. A third food park, on about 85 acres (34 ha) of land at Adoor in Pathanamthitta district, is under implementation. KINFRA also has plans to develop a spices park at Idukki for the processing of spices.

Besides these, KINFRA has also set up small industries parks under the Integrated Infrastructure Development Scheme of the Government of India, catering exclusively to small scale industrial units in growing sectors in the state. Such small industries parks have been set up by KINFRA at Thiruvananthapuram, Ernakulam, Thrissur, Wayanad and Kasaragod districts. Another park of its kind is being developed by KINFRA at Kunnamthanam in Pathanamthitta district.

== KINFRA Parks ==
=== Thiruvananthapuram ===
- KINFRA Film and Video Park, Kazhakkoottam
- KINFRA Apparel Park, Menamkulam
- KINFRA Global Ayurveda Village, Thonnakkal

=== Kollam ===
- KINFRA Industrial Park, Piravanthoor

=== Pathanamthitta ===
- KINFRA Industrial Park, Adoor
- KINFRA Industrial Park, Kunnamthanam

=== Alappuzha ===
- Seafood Park India Limited (Joint venture), Aroor

=== Kottayam ===
- No footprint as of now, need to have proposals & projects

=== Idukki ===
- No footprint as of now, need to have proposals & projects

=== Ernakulam ===
- Export Promotion Industrial Park, Kakkanad
- Hi-Tech Park, Kalamassery
- Industrial Park, Mazhuvannur
- Rubber Park (Joint venture), Irapuram

=== Thrissur ===
- Industrial Park, Koratty

=== Palakkad ===
- Defense Park, Ottappalam
- Industrial Park, Ottappalam
- Mega Food Park, Kanjikode
- Integrated Industrial & Textile Park, Kanjikode
- WISE Park (Joint venture), Kanjikode
- BEML Limited

=== Malappuram ===
- Techno-Industrial Park, Kakkancherry

=== Kozhikode ===
- Advanced Technology Park, Ramanattukara

=== Wayanad ===
- Industrial Park, Kalpetta

=== Kannur ===
- Textile Center, Taliparamba
- Industrial Park, Thalassery
- Indian Coast Guard Academy, Azhikkal
- Industrial Park, Mattannur
- Industrial Growth Centre, Kuthuparamba

=== Kasaragod ===
- Industrial Park, Seethangoli
- Hindustan Aeronautics Limited
