= Sabdatharavali =

Sabdatharavali (Malayalam: ശബ്ദതാരാവലി; "A star cluster of words") is a Malayalam dictionary having more than 1800 pages and considered as the most authentic Malayalam dictionary of the 20th century. The first part of this dictionary authored by Sreekanteswaram Padmanabha Pillai was published in 1918.

An open access version of Sabdatharavali is digitized by Sayahna Foundation in 2021.

== See also ==
- Kanippayyur Shankaran Namboodiripad
- Njattyela Sreedharan
