= Why loiter? =

Indian social movement

Why loiter? is a women-led campaign in India that aims to reclaim public spaces for women and challenge patriarchal societal norms. It was initiated in 2014 by Devina Kapoor and Neha Singh in Mumbai, India. The campaign draws inspiration from the book Why Loiter?: Women and Risk on Mumbai Streets authored by Shilpa Phadke, Sameera Khan, and Shilpa Ranade, published in 2011. It emerged as a response to the prevalent risks faced by women while navigating the streets of Mumbai, particularly in light of highly publicized cases of sexual violence such as the 2012 gang rape in Delhi and the 2014 rape of a woman by her Uber taxi driver in Delhi.

The campaign advocates for women 'loitering' – reclaiming public spaces by accessing them for leisure. As a part of the campaign, groups of women have walked the streets of Mumbai at midnight, performed singing activities in public transports, and participated in an elaborate social media campaign using the hashtag #whyloiter. The campaign was featured in BBC 100 women in 2016, an annual list celebrating the achievements of women internationally, from grassroots volunteers to global leaders. The campaign has also inspired similar campaigns in other countries such as Girls at Dhabas in Pakistan.

== Background ==
In 2012 and 2014, the #Why Loiter movement was inspired by the book 'Why Loiter?: Women and Risks on Mumbai Street' written in 2011. It was ignited by the spotlight on the crimes against women that had triggered massive protests at the time. Neha Singh, a founding member of the movement, states that the idea is to encourage women to take to the streets to explore the city and have fun.

== Why Loiter?: Women and Risks on Mumbai Streets ==
The Why Loiter? campaign was inspired by a book of the same name, co-authored by Shilpa Phadke, Sameera Khan and Shilpa Ranade and first published by Penguin Books in 2011. The book presents a manifesto for transformative change in the way public spaces are being perceived and reclaimed by women and marginalised identities in India.

Why Loiter? is a result of three years of research called the gender and space research project under the aegis of Partners for Urban Knowledge, Action and Research. It is considered an essential piece of feminist literature that not only examines the risks for women on Mumbai's streets, but also asks important questions on loitering as a form of pleasure and fun.

The authors argue that though women's access to urban public space has increased, they still do not have an equal claim to public space in Mumbai city. While the numbers of working women and female students are on the rise in India, it is unusual to see women out by themselves at night. The book draws on feminist theory to argue that only by celebrating loitering – a radical act for most Indian women – can an equal, global city be created.

Why Loiter? interrogates gender access to public space and the politics of risk through the act of loitering. The book argues that sitting around, enjoying leisure space as a woman and doing nothing is a simple yet transformational idea due to its controversial reception. The book asks: Why is the female body so readily attacked by prejudices, stereotypes and constrained to normative modes of femininity and being? In questioning the visibility of women in modern cosmopolitan cities, the authors further ask: "Who's having fun? Can girls really have fun? Do Muslim girls have less fun? Do rich girls have more fun? How do slum girls have fun? Can girls buy fun?"

The book also explores the ways the concept of the veil transforms the vision of the global city and interrogates how female bodies belong in said cities today: Are global cities really as 'open' as they relay? Has the female body and mind really been 'unveiled' and freed from patriarchal oppression? Loitering is thus the demonstration of 'unveiling' the woman – freeing her for an agency that embodies the right to inhabit and be in public space. For the authors, loitering serves as a "strategy of dissent" against the "gendered spatiality in Mumbai", a subversion of how gender roles are typically performed.

The book examines how the city is not designed or grown with any considerations for women. It traces instances from Mumbai's contemporary past on how women seek to occupy space as men in the same way. Women identified by caste, class, age, (dis)abilities, sexual orientation or ambiguities each have their own minefields to cross in a city that clearly does not offer any concessions, and prefers (as much as possible) that they were not on the street at all. At its core, it centers the normalization of loitering as a feminist act that is worth the risk and is central to citizenship. It describes loitering as a fundamental right to be reclaimed.

The authors also argue that the gatekeeping of public spaces in lieu of women's safety belies the dangerous hypocrisy of portraying homes as safe spaces for women, when research across the world suggests that women's homes are the most unsafe places for them.

In the context of the 2012 fatal gang rape of a student on a bus in Delhi and the 2014 rape of a woman by her Uber taxi driver in Delhi, women's rights to occupy public spaces were salient. The book's central questions were: Why is it okay for women to only be out at certain times or for certain reasons? Why should anyone question a woman's right to be in a public space at any time? These questions aimed to articulate anxieties stemming from a culture of victim blaming and also to reframe the national debate and protests around women's safety in the 2010s.

== Activities ==
=== Midnight walks ===
"If more women take up space and are recognised for doing so, it will become normal", said Neha Singh. This activity began in 2014 when Neha would take walks late at night and post about it on social media. Soon, she was joined by friends and other women who heard of her initiative. This gave birth to a more widely organized attempt to normalize women's presence and claiming of public spaces. Every Sunday, Why Loiter? organised walks for groups of women and girls to gather and roam around parks, streets and other public spaces in Mumbai from midnight to three a.m. This activity is considered unusual and often met with stares and uncomfortable exchanges, including ones where auto and cab drivers slow down around them in hopes that they will hop in. In addition to walking at midnight, the group has also cycled in the rains, visited tea stalls at midnight and napped in public parks.

=== Antakshri on public transportation ===
On 29 May, 2016, the Why loiter campaign marked 2 years by organizing an Antakshri session in Mumbai. Neha Singh says "We started because we wanted to have a creative session for women in a public transport where they could sing, be loud and visible and occupy as much space as they can." The group of women took a metro ride from Versova to Ghatkopar and back. On the metro, they sang Hindi songs, which attracted attention and even encouraged other passengers to join them.

=== Male involvement ===
Why Loiter? also organized a session to encourage men to join their cause. Nearly 20 men wore feminine clothing like sarees, high waist skirts, salwar kameez and dresses to walk alongside women from Prithvi Theatre to Juhu beach in Mumbai on April 4, 2015. "I believe that no women's rights movements are complete with the involvement of men," says Neha Singh.

== Media coverage and international recognition ==
The campaign received recognition on various media platforms such as Forbes, Hindustan Times, Outlook, Scroll.in, The Hindu and others. It also received recognition from beyond the country, with people following the footsteps of the campaign and starting their own version of Why Loiter? Girls at Dhabas was primarily an initiative of Karachi-based journalist Sadia Khatri photographed herself at a dhaba and then uploaded the image on the Internet, thus challenging the traditional role of women in public spaces. Nida Mushtaq, from the Fearless Collective, painted murals on the subject in Lahore, Karachi and Islamabad. Neha Singh was also featured under BBC 100 Women.

== See also ==
- Pinjra Tod
- Reclaim the night
- Take back the night
- Pink Chaddi Campaign
- Aravani Art Project
