= The Colors of the Mountain =

2010 film

- Colombian film poster
- Directed by: Carlos César Arbeláez
- Produced by: Julián Giraldo
- Starring: Genaro Aristizábal
- Cinematography: Óscar Jiménez
- Release dates: September 2010 (San Sebastian Film Festival); 11 March 2011 (Colombia)
- Running time: 90 minutes
- Countries: Colombia; Panama
- Language: Spanish

The Colors of the Mountain (Spanish: Los colores de la montaña) is a 2010 Colombian-Panamanian drama film directed by Carlos César Arbeláez. It won the Golden Pheasant Award for the Best Film at the sixteenth International Film Festival of Kerala. The film was selected as the Colombian entry for the Best Foreign Language Film at the 84th Academy Awards, but did not make the final shortlist.

== Cast ==
- Genaro Aristizábal
- Natalia Cuéllar
- Hernán Méndez
- Hernán Mauricio Ocampo as Manuel
- Nolberto Sánchez as Julián

== Plot ==
The film tells the story of an unnamed village in a mountainous region of present-day Colombia, focusing on its children in the perspective of 9 year old Manuel and his family.

The film starts with the scene of children entering a one-room school of 5 grades. The young teacher lets an older girl read the names of her attendance list, while she distributes paper booklets. The children are seen writing busily into them, but Manuel draws pictures. The teacher calls him out reminding him that it is mathematics lesson and everyone giggles. As the children walk home through swampy grass they pass by paramilitaries training in the field above them. Manuel's older friend Julian says that his older brother left town supposedly to work on the coast, though he believes he is with unnamed "guerillas". Manuel is seen cheerleading to play and starts a ball game in a tight circle of 10 boys, complaining the ball is a rag.

Manuel lives with his mother, father Ernesto and infant brother on a small finca, owning a couple of cows and raising pigs. He takes a trip to a market where his father tries to sell a piglet. His father leaves Manuel at an outdoor cafe table, disappears in a house and returns with a small grain sack. Back home at night he is seated at a small table opposite his father when his mother brings in a small chocolate cake lit with nine candles and Manuel unpacks his birthday present, a soccer ball and goalkeeper gloves.

The next day the boys are playing soccer with the new ball which lands in a rocky flat. At the same time, a large black sow that Ernesto was pulling runs nearby, a detonation is heard and the animal flies in the air. Everyone is stunned, children, men and the teacher. She proposes to post a sign warning the community of the presence of landmines.

The film revolves around Manuel's attempts to retrieve the ball, with the help of his older friend Julian and Poca Luz, an albino boy, as well as the changes in the village including, the growing number of absent students at school, families fleeing while paramilitaries and guerrillas are moving in and fighting for control of the area.

== Reviews ==
The film was positively reviewed in The Hollywood Reporter as operating "at the more accessible end of the arthouse spectrum, wrapping up an essentially tough, even bleak narrative within a lively, soccer-themed evocation of childhood".

== Awards ==
The film won the Golden Pheasant Award for the Best Film at the sixteenth International Film Festival of Kerala, held in Thiruvananthapuram. It was selected as the Colombian entry for the Academy Award for Best Foreign Language Film at the 84th Academy Awards in 2011, but it did not make the final shortlist.

The film premiered at the San Sebastian Film Festival in 2010, where Carlos Cesar Arbelaez won the "keenly-contested and lucrative ($120,000) Kutxa New Directors Award". It was shown at the opening night of the 51st annual Cartagena Film Festival and won an audience award.

== See also ==
- List of submissions to the 84th Academy Awards for Best Foreign Language Film
- List of Colombian submissions for the Academy Award for Best Foreign Language Film
