= Sadia Khatri =

Pakistani journalist and photographer, co-founder of Girls at Dhabas

- سعدیہ کھتری
- Born: Sadia Khatri
- Occupations: Writer, Journalist, Photographer, Film critic
- Known for: Feminist, Founder of Girls at Dhabas

Sadia Khatri (Urdu: سعدیہ کھتری) is a Pakistani writer, photographer and feminist based in Karachi. She has worked as a journalist at Dawn and The Kathmandu Post, and as a reportage editor with Papercuts Magazine. Khatri is also one of the founders of the feminist collective Girls at Dhabas.

== Early life and education ==
Sadia Khatri graduated from Mount Holyoke College, Massachusetts, USA. She began as an Astronomy and Physics major and later added Journalism and Media Studies.

Before coming to the United States, Khatri pursued photography as a hobby. Her interest in art and photography stems from her adventures in Karachi’s art and culture scene. She often attended concerts, literary lectures and community art shows with her sister, Fiza Khatri, who also attended Mount Holyoke College. Similar to the US blog "Humans of New York," Khatri blogged on the theme of "Humans of Pioneer Valley" during her college graduation period in the US.

In 2011, Khatri took photographs of children who spend most of their time living by the roadside in commercial areas of Karachi. These photographs were displayed in an exhibit in Karachi. Underneath each photograph, there was a quote from the corresponding street child to convey their perspective on life through their own words.

== Career ==
In her autobiographical essay "Fear and the City," which received a special citation in the recently announced Zeenat Haroon Rashid Writing Prize for Women, Khatri narrates her liberation through travel and struggle reclaiming public spaces in her hometown of Karachi, She ends her essay with her experience of a recent hate assault.

She has worked as a journalist at Dawn and The Friday Times. She also is a film critic. She also participated in Critic's Academy at the prestigious Locarno Film Festival.

She also acted in a music video of a feminist anthem by all-girl band Garam Anday.

== Feminism ==
Girls at Dhabas

Khatri is one of the founders of the feminist collective Girls at Dhabas. The collective was born out of the daily frustrations of middle- and upper-class women experience who are forced to stay in safe locations and cannot go out alone without good reason. This led Khatri to think about the violence she had experienced at home, in private spaces, which was far greater than anything she had been subjected to on the streets. It made her see how safety was just an argument used to reinforce the private/public binary and to police the bodies and sexuality of women.

Aurat March

Khatri's was part of the organizing team for Aurat March in 2018 (women's march).
