= Girls at Dhabas =

Pakistani based social movement

Girls at Dhabas is a multi-city feminist initiative in Pakistan that raises a conversation on women’s access to public space. Dhabas is a local term for roadside tea-shops that are traditionally male-dominated domains in South Asia. The efforts went viral in 2015 and gained significant traction from women across South Asia who were encouraged to photograph themselves at dhabas and upload the pictures on social media using the hashtag #girlsatdhabas, sharing their personal narratives, reflections and stories re-examining their relationship with public space. The viral campaign led to organized gatherings and offline events, from cricket playing in the streets, bike rallies in Karachi, Lahore, and Islamabad, and various community-building dialogues.

== Background ==
The collective began in 2015. Sadia Khatri photographed herself at a dhaba and then uploaded the image on the Internet. Sensing that this could become a larger, urgent conversation challenging the traditional role of women in public spaces, she teamed up with her friends Natasha Ansari, Sabahat Zakariya, Najia Sabahat Khan, Amna Chaudhry, Mehrbano Raja, Sanayah Malik, Yusra Amjad and Sara Nisar and launched Tumblr and Facebook online pages for the growing community.

== Other initiatives ==
=== #GirlsPlayingStreetCricket and #GirlsOnBikes Campaigns ===
In 2015, based on Natasha Ansari’s suggestion to expand efforts to cricket and cycling, Girls at Dhabas launched the #GirlsPlayingStreetCricket initiative through which women were encouraged to play cricket outside in the streets. Street cricket is a popular form of physical activity amongst the Pakistani youth. In 2018, at the Jumma Hafta (weekend) Art Bazaar outside t2f, Safieh Shah organized a mixed-gender, intersectional cricket match in the streets, with Anam Amin (spin-bowling star from Pakistan’s National Cricket team) to encourage women and girls to take on cricket and reclaim public spaces.

In 2016, a woman named Aneeqa Ali was harassed and injured while riding her bicycle out in Lahore, Pakistan. In response to this incident and as an act of condemnation and solidarity, Girls at Dhabas organized a bike rally (which became an annual event) called Girls on Bikes aimed at encouraging women to embrace cycling and two-wheeler transportation, which continues to be taboo for women. In Lahore, Noor Rahman joined the Girls at Dhabas chapters and organized weekly bike rides following the rally.

=== Behenchara ===
The word commonly used to express 'solidarity' in Urdu is 'bhaichara' (literally brotherhood). Girls at Dhabas coined the term ‘behenchara’ (sisterhood) as a spin on the original. By reframing the word 'bhaichara,' Girls at Dhabas aims to claim language and the vernacular to articulate a vision of a broader feminist solidarity, radically re-imagining traditional gender relations through the lens of sisterhood and collectivism.

=== Behanchara Diaries ===
In 2017, Safieh Shah and Zehra Naqvi, members of Girls at Dhabas, founded a podcast series called "Behanchara Diaries". The podcast features five episodes and explores feminism, intersectionality, the politics of public spaces and more. The podcast currently streams on Patari, Pakistan’s biggest music streaming service.

=== Aurat March ===
In 2018, members of Girls at Dhabas helped co-organize the "Aurat March", a feminist rally to honor International Women's Day, celebrated on 8 March annually. In Lahore, Girls at Dhabas was one of the organizing groups of the Aurat March, along with The Feminist Collective, The Women’s Collective, and others. In Karachi, members were part of the Aurat March in their individual capacities since the organizing committee was unaffiliated with any groups

== Criticism ==
Girls at Dhabas attracted criticism after the #GirlsOnBikes movement from social media users who were against the idea of women claiming public spaces.

== See also ==
- Aurat Foundation
- Blue Veins
- Feminism in Pakistan
- Me Too movement (Pakistan)
- Mera Jism Meri Marzi
- Rape in Pakistan
- Violence against women in Pakistan
- Women in Islam
- Women in Pakistan
- Women's Action Forum
- Women's Protection Bill
- Women's rights
- Why Loiter? Campaign
