= Dreaming of Words =

2021 Indian documentary film

- Movie poster for Dreaming of Words
- Directed by: Nandan
- Produced by: Nandan
- Cinematography: Surjith S Pai
- Edited by: Sreevalsan RS
- Music by: Arun Alat
- Release dates: 21 February 2021 (India); 26 April 2021 (USA)
- Running time: 60 minutes
- Country: India
- Languages: Malayalam, Tamil

Dreaming of Words is a 2021 Indian documentary film directed and produced by Nandan. The documentary traces the life and work of Njattyela Sreedharan, a fourth standard drop-out (roughly equivalent to fourth grade in American or Canadian schools), who compiles a dictionary connecting four major Dravidian languages.

Dreaming of Words has received numerous accolades including National Film Award for Best Educational/Motivational/Instructional Film (2020) awarded to Nandan as both director and producer at the 68th National Film Awards.

== Synopsis ==
Njattyela Sreedharan, a fourth standard drop-out, compiles a dictionary connecting four major Dravidian languages. Travelling across four states and doing extensive research, he spent twenty five years making the multilingual dictionary. This unique dictionary offers a comparative study of Malayalam, Kannada, Tamil and Telugu. Dreaming of Words traces Sreedharan's life, work, love for languages and the struggles to get the dictionary published. The film also explores the linguistic and cultural diversity in India.

=== People featured ===
The documentary follows Njattyela Sreedharan's unparalleled determination to compile his 'Dictionary of Four Dravidian Languages'. The film also features P. K. Pokker, former director of Kerala Bhasha Institute, who decided to publish Sreedharan's Tamil - Malayalam dictionary in 2012 and K. P. Mohanan, the secretary of Kerala Sahitya Akademi.

Also featured in the documentary are Seetharam Master, N. P. Usha and K. K. Ramesh.

== Release ==
Dreaming of Words had its world premiere at the International Mother Language Day Celebrations 2021 organised by the Indira Gandhi National Centre for the Arts and the Ministry of Education (India) in partnership with UNESCO. This was followed by an international premiere as part of Kultura Con at the Brazilian Cultural Center in Angola. Dreaming of Words had its American premiere at the Micheaux Film Festival on 26 April 2021. The documentary was screened at the annual convention of the Modern Language Association and the annual conference of the Linguistic Society of America in January 2022.

== Official selections and screenings ==
=== Film festivals ===
- Central Florida Film Festival - 2022
- Black Bear Film Festival - USA – 2021
- Kultura Con – Angola – 2 March 2021
- RapidLion: The South African International Film Festival – South Africa – 9 April 2021
- Micheaux Film festival – USA – 26 April 2021 (American premiere)
- 61st Kraków Film Festival Video Library – Poland - 30 May 2021
- Chicago South Asian Film Festival - 2021
- Washington DC South Asian Film Festival – USA - 2021
- Agora Doc Market Thessaloniki Documentary Festival – Greece - 24 June 2021
- Festival International du Film de Bretagne – France (European premiere) – 8 July 2021
- Festival Nits de cinema oriental de Vic (Asian Summer Film Festival) – Spain – 20 July 2021
- Florida South Asian Film Festival – 2021
- Guangzhou International Documentary Film Festival – China - 2022
- Atlanta Urban Mediamakers Festival – 2021
- Fiorenzo Serra Film festival – Italy – 2021
- Vizantrop Engaged Ethnographic Film Festival – Serbia – 2021
- 17th Festival Transterritorial de Cine Underground – Argentina – 2021
- Jaffna International Cinema Festival – Sri Lanka – 2021
- Madurai International Documentary and Short Film Festival – India – 2021
- SiGNS Film Festival - Kerala - 3 April 2022
- Virginia Dares Film Festival by Virginia Tech - USA - November 2021
- Beyond Babel Film Festival by Manchester Metropolitan University - UK - 7 June 2021

=== Academic conferences ===
- Annual Convention of the Modern Language Association – 7 January 2022
- Annual Conference of the Linguistics Society of America – 9 January 2022
- 28th annual Midwestern Conference on Literature, Language and Media (MCLLM) at Northern Illinois University in DeKalb, Illinois – USA - 2 April 2021
- 14th International Conference of the Asian Association for Lexicography (ASIALEX 2021) – Indonesia – June 2021
- 12th International Indology Graduate Research Symposium (IIGRS 12) organised by the University of Vienna in collaboration with the Austrian Academy of Sciences - Austria – July 2021
- Inter-Asia Cultural Studies Society's conference (IACSS 2021) organised by the Inter-Asia Cultural Studies Society in collaboration with the Cultural Research Centre at National University of Singapore - July 2021
- World Congress of Applied Linguistics 2021 organised by the International Association of Applied Linguistics at University of Groningen, Netherlands - August 2021
- Annual colloquium of La Société d’Histoire et d’Epistémologie des Sciences du Langage (SHESL) 2022 at Institut national des langues et civilisations orientales, Paris - 26 January 2022
- XI Ethnology days and the VIII Finnish Conference on Cultural Policy Research at the University of Jyväskylä, Finland - March 2022
- 3rd Asian Conference on Language (ACL2022) organised by The International Academic Forum - Tokyo - 26 March 2022
- 20th Biennial Conference of the European Association for Lexicography (EURALEX 2022) organised by Leibniz Institute for the German Language in Mannheim - Germany - 13 July 2022

=== Other events ===
- International Mother Language Day Celebrations organised by The Centre for Linguistics, SLL&CS, Jawaharlal Nehru University, New Delhi - 21 February 2022
- 5th Kochi-Muziris Biennale - Kerala - 16 February 2023

== Awards ==
- National Film Award for Best Educational/Motivational/Instructional Film (2020)
- Kerala State Television Award (2020) for Best Educational Programme
- Festival Prize for Best International Documentary Film at Festival International du Film de Bretagne (2021)
- Audience Award for Best Documentary at the Washington DC South Asian Film Festival (2021)
- Festival Prize for Best Poster at the Buenos Aires International Film Festival (2021)

== See also ==
- Multilingualism
- Dravidian Languages
- Lexicography
- Njattyela Sreedharan
