= Aani Maani =

- Directed by: Fahim Irshad
- Written by: Fahim Irshad
- Produced by: Farrukh Seyer
- Release date: 2019
- Country: India
- Language: Hindi

Aani Maani is a 2019 Indian Hindi-language drama film, written and directed by Fahim Irshad in his feature film debut. It stars Farrukh Seyer with Priyanka Verma and Neha Singh in supporting roles. The film won the NETPAC award for best Asian film and Irshad won the K R Mohanan award for best debut director from India at the 24th International Film Festival of Kerala.

== Plot ==
The film follows Bhutto, a Muslim kebab seller in Noorpur, Uttar Pradesh, India, who comes from a lower-middle-class family. His life changes as a result of a beef ban announced by the government. The film borrows its name from a game played by children in Uttar Pradesh wherein they turn in circles while reciting the rhyme 'Aani Maani'.

== Cast ==
- Farrukh Seyer as Bhutto
- Priyanka Verma as Tarannum
- Neha Singh as Nazo
- Padma Damodaran as Najma
- Arni as Affi
- Shamim Abbas as the father

== Reception ==
The film has been praised for representing Muslim life in contemporary India, while touching on socio-political issues faced by them. Movie critic Gautaman Bhaskaran said the film is of "immense social value", is "minimalist in its framing and story-telling" and the actors perform "with natural ease". Calling Aani Maani an important film, Subhash Babu of OnManorama wrote that "it does not preach politics on your face though it is arguably the finest film made on the issue of cow vigilantism." He went on to praise the screenplay as it does not reveal the budgetary constraints of the filmmakers. Writing for Mathrubhumi, Sreearavind S stated that the film "is a cleverly written drama, that evokes empathy, asks tough questions." He added that "the film's merit is not limited to its social commentary. The writing proves to be the spine of the movie." Prathyush Parasuraman of Film Companion described the film as "an immersive world building exercise that is designed to be unraveled", but mentioned what he felt were "rough edges", criticizing the dialogue delivery in some places, a generic romantic ballad and the CGI effects.

=== Accolades ===
In the competition category of the 24th International Film Festival of Kerala, Aani Maani bagged the Network for the Promotion of Asian Cinema (NETPAC)'s Best Asian Film award and K R Mohanan award for the best debut director from India. At the 7th edition of FOI Online Awards, Irshad was selected as the Special Jury Mention in the writer-screenplay category, while Neha Singh was nominated under the Best Actress in a Supporting Role category.
