= International Film Festival of Kerala =

Annual film festival held in Thiruvananthapuram, India

Coordinates: 08°31′N 76°56′E

- Location: Thiruvananthapuram, Kerala, India
- Most recent: 2025
- Awards: The Golden Crow Pheasant Award, The Silver Crow Pheasant Award, Best Debut Film Award, Audience Prize, FIPRESCI Award, Netpac Award
- Hosted by: Kerala State Chalachitra Academy
- Artistic director: Deepika Suseelan
- Festival date: November / December
- Language: International
- Website: www.iffk.in

The International Film Festival of Kerala (IFFK) is a film festival held annually in Thiruvananthapuram, the capital city of Kerala, India. This film festival started in 1996 and is hosted by the Kerala State Chalachitra Academy on behalf of the Department of Cultural Affairs, Government of Kerala. The festival is held in November or December every year and is acknowledged as one of the leading cultural events in India.

Several national and international films have their premiers at the IFFK each year. The competition section is limited to 14 selected films produced in Asia, Africa or Latin America. The festival also has a section devoted to Malayalam cinema. On the lines of the IFFK, the Chalachitra Academy also organises the International Documentary and Short Film Festival of Kerala. The academy also organized a regional film festival in 2022, Regional International Film Festival of Kerala held in Kochi.

== History ==
The Indian Government's Directorate of Film Festivals held the International Film Festival of India (IFFI) at Thiruvananthapuram, in 1988. The festival cultivated an interest in serious films and led to creation of several film societies throughout the state. The activities of the societies included screening of classic films from around the world, conducting group discussions on various aspects of cinema and circulating pamphlets on renowned filmmakers. The film societies obtained copies of films from archives and from embassies of some countries as a part of culture-exchange programmes. The film society movement helped to raise film literacy among people and the need for an international film festival to the level of the IFFI came up.

The first International Film Festival of Kerala (IFFK) was held in Kozhikode in 1996. The festival was held on the 100th anniversary of cinema, and 100 films were screened as a part of the event.

The event was managed by the Kerala State Film Development Corporation (KSFDC) till 1998, when the Kerala State Chalachitra Academy was formed and was bestowed with the responsibility of conducting IFFK, along with other activities for promotion of cinema. The Academy introduced IFFK as the competitive festival by filmmaker Shaji N. Karun, who became chairman and executive director of IFFK.

The FIAPF accredited the festival, and a competition section was added to the event in 1999.

== Description ==
The competition is limited to films produced in Asia, Africa or Latin America. The FIPRESCI (Fédération Internationale de la Presse Cinématographique) and the Netpac (Network for the Promotion of Asian Cinema) have recognised the festival.

The logo of IFFK and competition awards are designed by National Institute of Design, Ahmedabad.

== Highlights of the Festival ==
Contemporary World Cinema, New Malayalam Cinema, Retrospectives of Major filmmakers, Homage and Tributes, Contemporary Indian Cinema, Short films and Documentaries are screened during the film festival. Film Market and Seminars on important issues concerning Cinema are also scheduled during the IFFK. The festival is now permanently held at various cinema halls in Thiruvananthapuram. The festival is always noted for its public support. The festival is perhaps the only one to have had screenings in a prison (Poojappura Central Jail, Thiruvananthapuram), a juvenile home and a poor home (Sri Chitra Poor Home).

== Festival Awards ==
- The Golden Crow Pheasant Award: (Suvarna Chakoram) and a cash prize of Rs 1,000,000/- (about US$20,000) to the best feature film to be shared equally by the director and the producer
- The Silver Crow Pheasant Award: (Rajatha Chakoram) and a cash prize of Rs 300,000/- (about US$6,000) to the best director
- The Silver Crow Pheasant Award: (Rajatha Chakoram) and a cash prize of Rs 200,000/- (about US$4,000) to the best debut director
- Audience Prize: (Rajatha Chakoram) and cash prize of Rs 100,000 (about US$2,000) to the Director of the most popular film voted by the festival delegates
- FIPRESCI Award: For the best film chosen by the Fédération Internationale de la Presse Cinématographique
- NETPAC Award: For the best film in the competition section from Asia, chosen by the Network for the Promotion of Asian Cinema

In 2007, the FIPRESCI and the NETPAC awards were introduced, to be awarded separately to the best Malayalam films at the festival.

=== Golden Crow Pheasant for Best Film – Winners ===
Year	Film	English Title	Director	Country	Ref.
1999	Hai shang hua	Flowers of Shanghai	Hou Hsiao-hsien	Taiwan	
2000	Mayonnaise		Yoon In-ho	South Korea	
2001	Ali Zaoua		Nabil Ayouch	Morocco	
2002	Anyangde guer	The Orphan of Anyang	Wang Chao	China	
2003	Abouna	Our Father	Mahamat Saleh Haroun	Chad	
2004	Días de Santiago	Days of Santiago	Josué Méndez	Peru	
2005	Sheng si jie	Stolen Life	Shaohong Li	China	
2006	Melegin Düsüsü	Angel's Fall	Semih Kaplanoğlu	Turkey	
2006	Nirontor	Forever Flows	Abu Sayeed	Bangladesh	
2007	XXY		Lucía Puenzo	Argentina	
2007	10 + 4		Mania Akbari	Iran	
2008	Parque via		Enrique Rivero	Mexico	
2009	Darbareye Elly	About Elly	Asghar Farhadi	Iran	
2009	Jermal	Fishing Platform	Ravi Bharwani	Indonesia	
2010	Retratos en un mar de mentiras	Portraits in a Sea of Lies	Carlos Gaviria	Colombia	
2011	Los colores de la montaña	The Colours of the Mountain	Carlos Cesar Arbelaez	Colombia	
2012	Sta. Niña		Emmanuel Quindo Palo	Philippines	
2013	Parviz		Majid Barzegar	Iran	
2014	Refugiado		Diego Lerman	Argentina	
2015	Ottaal	The Trap	Jayaraj	India	
2016	Eshtebak	Clash	Mohamed Diab	Egypt	
2017	Wajib	Wajib	Annemarie Jacir	Palestine	
2018	Otagh-e-Tarik	The Dark Room	Rouhollah Hejazi	Iran	
2019	Aru Sendo No Hanashi	They Say Nothing Stays the Same	Jō Odagiri	Japan	
2020	This Is Not a Burial, It's a Resurrection		Lemohang Jeremiah Mosese	Lesotho	
2021	Clara Sola		Nathalie Álvarez Mesén	Costa Rica	
2022	Utama		Alejandro Loayza Grisi	Bolivia	
2023	Aku wa Sonzai Shinai	Evil Does Not Exist	Ryusuke Hamaguchi	Japan	
2024	Malu	Malu	Pedro Freire	Brazil	
2025	Tabi to Hibi	Two Seasons, Two Strangers	Sho Miyake	Japan	

== IFFK 2025 ==
The 30th International Film Festival of Kerala (IFFK 2025) was held from 12 to 19 December 2025.

=== The Awards ===
- The Golden Crow Pheasant Award for the Best film – Two Seasons, Two Strangers directed by Sho Miyake from Japan
- The Silver Crow Pheasant Award for the Best Director – Carina Piazza, Lucía Bracelis for Antes del cuerpo
- The Silver Crow Pheasant Award for the Best Debut Director – Tanushree Das, Saumyananda Sahi for Baksho Bondi
- Lifetime Achievement Award – Abderrahmane Sissako from Mauritania
- Special Jury Mention for Performance – Tillottama Shome
- Special Jury Mention for Technical Excellence – Black Rabbit, White Rabbit
- FIPRESCI Award: Best International Film – Khidki Gaav by Sanju Surendran
- FIPRESCI Award: Best Malayalam Film of a Debut Director – Moham by Fazil Razak
- NETPAC Award: Best Asian Film – Cinema Jazireh by Gözde Kural
- NETPAC Award: Best Malayalam Film – Khidki Gaav by Sanju Surendran, തന്തപ്പേര് by Unnikrishnan Avala
- FFSI KR Mohanan Award for Best Debut Director from India – Tanushree Das, Saumyananda Sahi for Baksho Bondi
- Jury Prize – തന്തപ്പേര് by Unnikrishnan Avala
- Audience Poll Award – തന്തപ്പേര് by Unnikrishnan Avala

== IFFK 2024 ==
The 29th International Film Festival of Kerala (IFFK 2024) chose Swapnaayanam, directed by K. O. Akhil and starring Abhirami Bose as first Malayalam actress P. K. Rosy, as its signature film. The film that uses animation to show the development of Malayalam cinema and honouring the role of Rosy.

== IFFK 2023 ==
The 28th edition of the International Film Festival of Kerala (IFFK 2024) was held from 8 to 15 December 2023 in Thiruvananthapuram. The festival concluded with a grand valedictory function at Nishagandhi Auditorium, where distinguished guests and filmmakers gathered for the closing ceremony.

Polish filmmaker Krzysztof Zanussi was honoured with the Lifetime Achievement Award, presented by veteran Malayalam filmmaker Adoor Gopalakrishnan. The Suvarna Chakoram (Golden Crow Pheasant) for Best Film was awarded to the Japanese film Evil Does Not Exist, directed by Ryusuke Hamaguchi. The award was received by cinematographer Yoshio Kitagawa on behalf of the director.

== IFFK 2022 ==
The 27th International Film Festival of Kerala (IFFK 2022) was held from 9 to 16 December 2022. Hungarian filmmaker Béla Tarr was presented the Lifetime Achievement Award by Kerala's Minister of Culture V. N. Vasavan.This edition of the IFFK witnessed a change at the helm, as Deepika Suseelan took over as artistic director from Bina Paul.

Bolivian film Utama directed by Alejandro Loayza Grisi was awarded the Suvarna Chakoram for Best Film. Tayfun Pirselimoglu was awarded Rajata Chakoram for Best Director for his film Kerr.

== IFFK 2021 ==
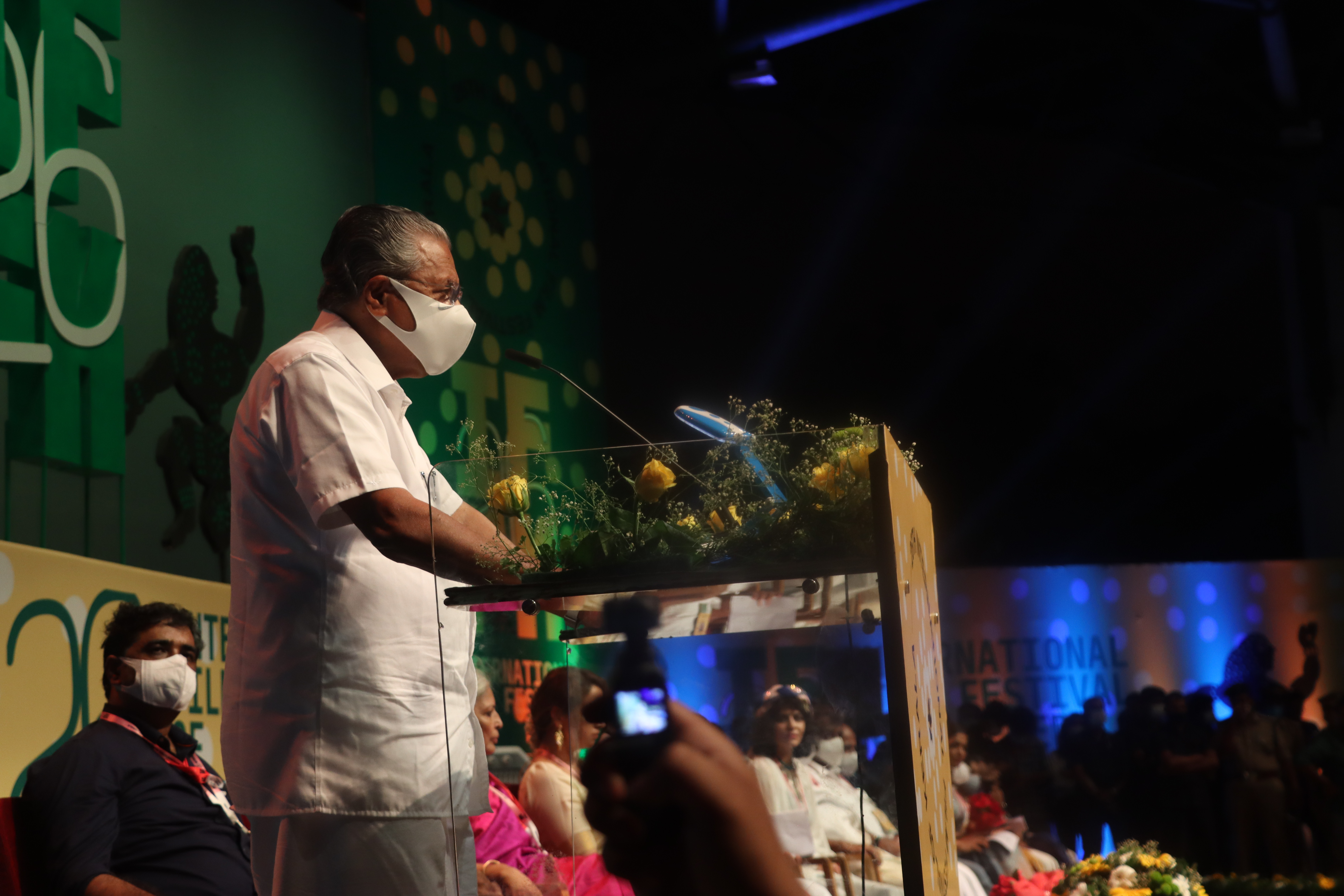
Pinarayi Vijayan inaugurating 26th International Film Festival of Kerala

The 26th International Film Festival of Kerala (IFFK 2021) was held from 18 to 25 March 2022. The festival was inaugurated by the Chief Minister of Kerala, Pinarayi Vijayan. Kurdish film maker Lisa Calan was awarded with the Spirit of Cinema award at the inaugural function in Thiruvananthapuram.

=== The Awards ===
- NETPAC Award: Best Malayalam Film – Musical Chair directed by Vipin Atley

== IFFK 2020 ==
The 25th International Film Festival of Kerala (IFFK 2021) was held in four legs from 10 February 2021 to 5 March 2021. It was held in four locations unlike its predecessors; Thiruvananthapuram, Kochi, Palakkad and Thalassery.

Adoor Gopalakrishnan received the Lifetime Achievement Award on behalf of Jean-Luc Godard, who pioneered the French New Wave film movement.

== IFFK 2019 ==
The 24th International Film Festival of Kerala (IFFK 2019) was held over eight days, from 6 December 2019 to 13 December 2019. The opening film was Passed by Censor by Serhat Karaaslan. The international jury was chaired by Egyptian director Khairy Beshara.

=== The Awards ===
- The Golden Crow Pheasant Award for the Best film – Aru Sendo No Hanashi directed by Jōe Odagiri from Japan
- Lifetime Achievement Award – Fernando Solanas from Argentina
- Audience Prize for Best Film – Jallikattu by Lijo Jose Pellissery
- The Silver Crow Pheasant Award for the Best Director – Allan Deberton for Paquerette
- Special Mention, in the Category 'Best Director' – Lijo Jose Pellissery for Jallikattu
- The Silver Crow Pheasant Award for the Best Debut Director – Cesar Diaz for Nuestros Madres (Our Mothers)
- FIPRESCI Award: Best Film – Camille directed by Boris Lojkine
- FIPRESCI Award: Best Malayalam Film – Pani directed by Santhosh Mandoor
- NETPAC Award: Best Asian Film – Aani Maani by Fahim Irshad from India
- NETPAC Award: Best Malayalam Film – Veyilmarangal directed by Dr. Biju
- NETPAC Award: Malayalam Film (Special Mention) – Kumbalangi Nights by Madhu C Narayanan
- K R Mohanan Award for Best Debut Director from India – Aani Maani by Fahim Irshad

== IFFK 2018 ==
The 23rd IFFK was held from 7 December 2018 to 13 December 2018. This edition was initially cancelled due to heavy flooding across parts of Kerala. However, it was later decided to conduct the festival on a limited scale. The opening film was Todos lo Saben by Asghar Farhadi. The international jury was chaired by Iranian director Majid Majidi.

=== The Awards ===
- The Golden Crow Pheasant Award for the Best film – Otagh-e-Tarik directed by Rouhollah Hejazi from Iran
- The Silver Crow Pheasant Award for the Best Director – Lijo Jose Pellissery for Ee. Maa. Yau.
- The Silver Crow Pheasant Award for the Best Debut Director – Anamika Haksar for Taking the Horse to eat Jalebis (Ghode Ko Jalebi Khilane Le Ja Riya Hoon)
- FIPRESCI Award: Best Malayalam Film – Sudani from Nigeria directed by Zakariya Mohammed
- NETPAC Award: Best Asian Film – Ee. Maa. Yau. directed by Lijo Jose Pellissery from India
- K R Mohanan Award for Best Film – Manohar and I by Amitabha Chatterjee

== IFFK 2017 ==
The 22nd IFFK was held in December 2017.

=== The Awards ===
- The Golden Crow Pheasant Award for the Best film – Wajib directed by Annemarie Jacir
- The Silver Crow Pheasant Award for the Best Director – Anucha Boonyawatana for Malila: The Farewell Flower
- The Silver Crow Pheasant Award for the Best Debut Director – Sanju Surendran for Aedan
- The Silver Crow Pheasant Award for the Best Feature Film (Audience Prize) – I Still Hide to Smoke
- FIPRESCI Award: Best Malayalam Film – Aedan directed by Sanju Surendran
- FIPRESCI Award: Best International Film – Newton directed by Amit Masurkar from India
- NETPAC Award: Best Malayalam Film – Thondimuthalum Driksakshiyum
- NETPAC Award: Best Asian Film – Newton directed by Amit Masurkar from India

== IFFK 2016 ==
The 21st IFFK was held in December 2014

=== The Awards ===
- The Golden Crow Pheasant Award for the Best film – Eshtebak directed by Mohamed Diab
- The Silver Crow Pheasant Award for the Best Director – Yesim Ustaoglu for Tereddüt
- The Silver Crow Pheasant Award for the Best Debut Director – Vidhu Vincent for Manhole
- The Silver Crow Pheasant Award for the Best Feature Film (Audience Prize) – Eshtebak directed by Mohamed Diab
- FIPRESCI Award: Best Malayalam Film – Manhole directed by Vidhu Vincent
- FIPRESCI Award: Best International Film – Almacenados directed by Jack Zagha
- NETPAC Award: Best Malayalam Film – Kammatipaadam directed by Rajeev Ravi
- NETPAC Award: Best Asian Film – Cold of Kalandar directed by Mustafa Kara

== IFFK 2015 ==
The 20th IFFK was held from 12 December 2014 to 19 December 2014. With a total of 140 films, 10 sections and 12 theatres, The world cinema package of the IFFK has a total of 60 films from 37 countries, including, French and Chinese film packages.

=== The Awards ===
- The Golden Crow Pheasant Award for the Best film – Refugiado directed by Nicolas Avruj
- The Silver Crow Pheasant Award for the Best Director – Hiroshi Toda for Summer, Kyoto
- The Silver Crow Pheasant Award for the Best Debut Director – Hossein Shahabi for The Bright Day
- FIPRESCI Award: Best Malayalam Film – Oraalppokkam directed by Sanalkumar Sasidharan
- FIPRESCI Award: Best International Film – They Are The Dogs directed by Hicham Lasri
- NETPAC Award: Best Malayalam Film – Oraalppokkam directed by Sanalkumar Sasidharan
- NETPAC Award: Best Asian Film – Summer, Kyoto directed by Hiroshi Toda from Japan

== IFFK 2014 ==
The 19th IFFK was held from 12 December 2014 to 19 December 2014. With a total of 140 films, 10 sections and 12 theatres, The world cinema package of the IFFK has a total of 60 films from 37 countries, including, French and Chinese film packages.

=== The Awards ===
- The Golden Crow Pheasant Award for the Best film – Refugiado directed by Nicolas Avruj
- The Silver Crow Pheasant Award for the Best Director – Hiroshi Toda for Summer, Kyoto
- The Silver Crow Pheasant Award for the Best Debut Director – Hossein Shahabi for The Bright Day
- FIPRESCI Award: Best Malayalam Film – Oraalppokkam directed by Sanalkumar Sasidharan
- FIPRESCI Award: Best International Film – They Are The Dogs directed by Hicham Lasri
- NETPAC Award: Best Malayalam Film – Oraalppokkam directed by Sanalkumar Sasidharan
- NETPAC Award: Best Asian Film – Summer, Kyoto directed by Hiroshi Toda from Japan

== IFFK 2013 ==
The 18th IFFK was held from 7 December 2013 to 13 December 2013. The festival began with the guests and audience observing a minute's silent prayer in honour of South African leader Nelson Mandela. Renowned actress Shabana Azmi was the chief guest. Amos Gitai's Ana Arabia, an Israeli movie shot in an 85-minute-long single sequence was the opening film at the festival. As many as 211 films from 64 countries under various categories like 'Competition Section', 'World Cinema', 'Indo-German Connection Section', 'Samurai Film Section', 'Retrospective Section' and 'Homage Section' were screened during the festival. A total of 14 movies from Asia, Africa and Latin America were selected for the Competition Section, while the World Cinema segment had 79 movies. Seven films including those of noted Japanese directors like Kon Ichikawa and Kenji Mizoguchi comprised the Samurai Film section. Seeking to mark the centenary celebrations of Indian cinema, a special section titled "Original Glory: 100 Years of Indian Cinema" was included. It included Indian classics like Satyajit Ray's Charulata and Mrinal Sen's Bhuvan Shome. Veteran Mexican filmmaker Arturo Ripstein chaired the jury panel of the Competition Section, which also comprised Thai film maker Aditya Assarat, South African director Khalo Matabane and south Indian actor Gautami. Spanish Filmmaker Carlos Saura was presented with the Lifetime Achievement Award.

=== The Awards ===
- The Golden Crow Pheasant Award for the Best film – Parviz (Majid Barzegar)
- The Silver Crow Pheasant Award for the Best Debut Film – Errata (Ivan Vescovo)
- The Silver Crow Pheasant Award for the Best Director – Kamaleswar Mukherjee (Meghe Dhaka Tara)
- The Silver Crow Pheasant Award for the Best Feature Film (Audience Prize) – 101 Chodyangal (101 Questions) (Sidhartha Shiva)
- FIPRESCI Award for Best Film Competition Section – Errata (Ivan Vescovo)
- FIPRESCI Award for Best Malayalam Film – Kanyaka Talkies
- NETPAC Award for Best Malayalam Film – CR No: 89

== IFFK 2012 ==
The 17th IFFK was at Thiruvananthapuram 7–14 December 2012. It was inaugurated by Kerala Chief Minister Oommen Chandy with a special screening of Alfred Hitchcock's silent film The Ring (1927), with the accompaniment of live orchestration of a new score created by the sextet led by British Jazz artiste Soweto Kinch. One hundred and ninety eight films from 54 countries were shown in the festival.

14 films were screened in the competition section, including two Malayalam films (Bhoomiyude Avakashikal by T. V. Chandran and Shutter by Joy Mathew) and two non-Malayalam Indian films (I.D by Kamal K. M. and Filmistaan by Nitin Kakkar). IFFK 2012 had retrospectives of thespians and auteurs, past and present. It had works by Australian filmmaker Paul Cox (who chaired the competition jury), Burkina Faso film director and screenwriter Pierre Yameogo, French filmmaker Alain Resnais, the Japanese master filmmaker Akira Kurosawa, Brazilian actor Helena Ignez, British filmmaker Alfred Hitchcock and Malayalam actor Sathyan.

IFFK 2012 was appreciated for improved viewing experiences it provided through better theatre atmosphere and high-tech sound and visual systems. IFFK 2012 was not free from controversies either. The ban imposed on the reshow of Deepa Mehta's Midnight's Children created a widespread controversy. The film, an adaptation of renowned writer Salman Rushdie's masterpiece novel Midnight's Children, had its Asian premiere at the IFFK. After the premiere, Indian National Congress leaders said that the film portrayed former Indian prime minister Indira Gandhi and other leaders in a negative manner. Following the allegations, further festival screening of the film was stopped, an act which drew heavy criticism. Another controversy developed when Jayan K. Cherian's Papilio Buddha was removed from the programme when it was alleged by the Kerala Police that it became known that continued inclusion of the film in the festival might trigger major trouble in the city due to its alleged negative remarks on Mahatma Gandhi and sympathy with Dalit.

=== The Awards ===
- The Golden Crow Pheasant Award for Best Feature Film – Sta. Nina (Emmanuel Quindo Palo)
- Special Jury mention- The Last Step- Ali Mosaffa (Iran)
- The Silver Crow Pheasant Award for Best Debut Film – Filmistaan (Nitin Kakkar)
- The Silver Crow Pheasant Award for Best Director – Francisca Silva (Ivan's Woman)
- The Silver Crow Pheasant Award for Best Feature Film (Audience Prize) – Shutter (Joy Mathew)
- FIPRESCI Award for Best Asian Film – The Repentant (Merzak Allouache)
- FIPRESCI Award for Best Malayalam Film – Ithra Mathram (K. Gopinath)
- NETPAC Award for Best Asian Film – I. D. (K. D. Kamal)
- NETPAC Award for Best Malayalam Film – Ee Adutha Kalathu (Arun Kumar Aravind)
- Hassan Kutty Award for Best Debut Indian Film – Chayilyam (Manoj Kana)

== IFFK 2011 ==
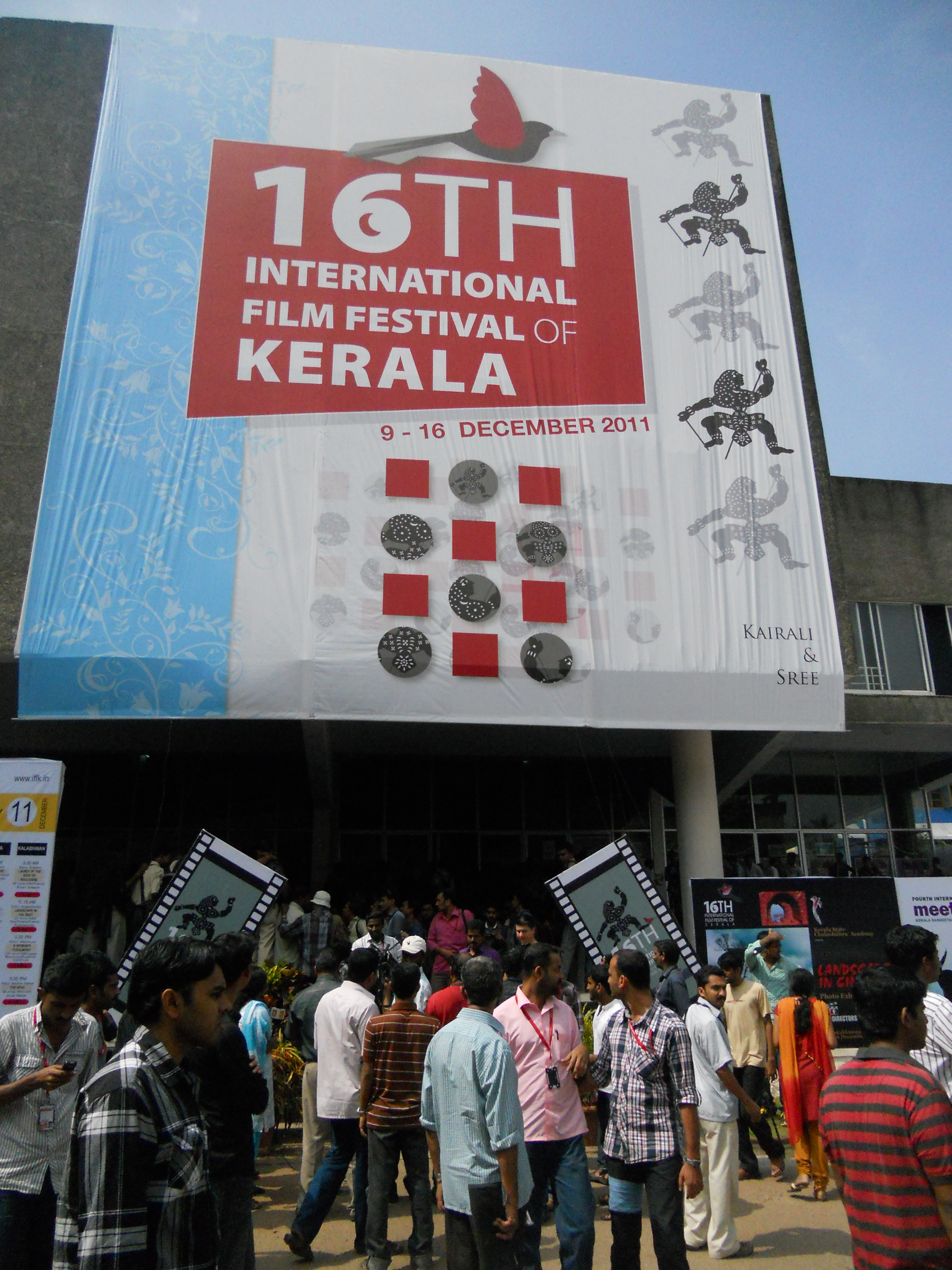
Main venue of 16th Iffk 2011 at Kairali

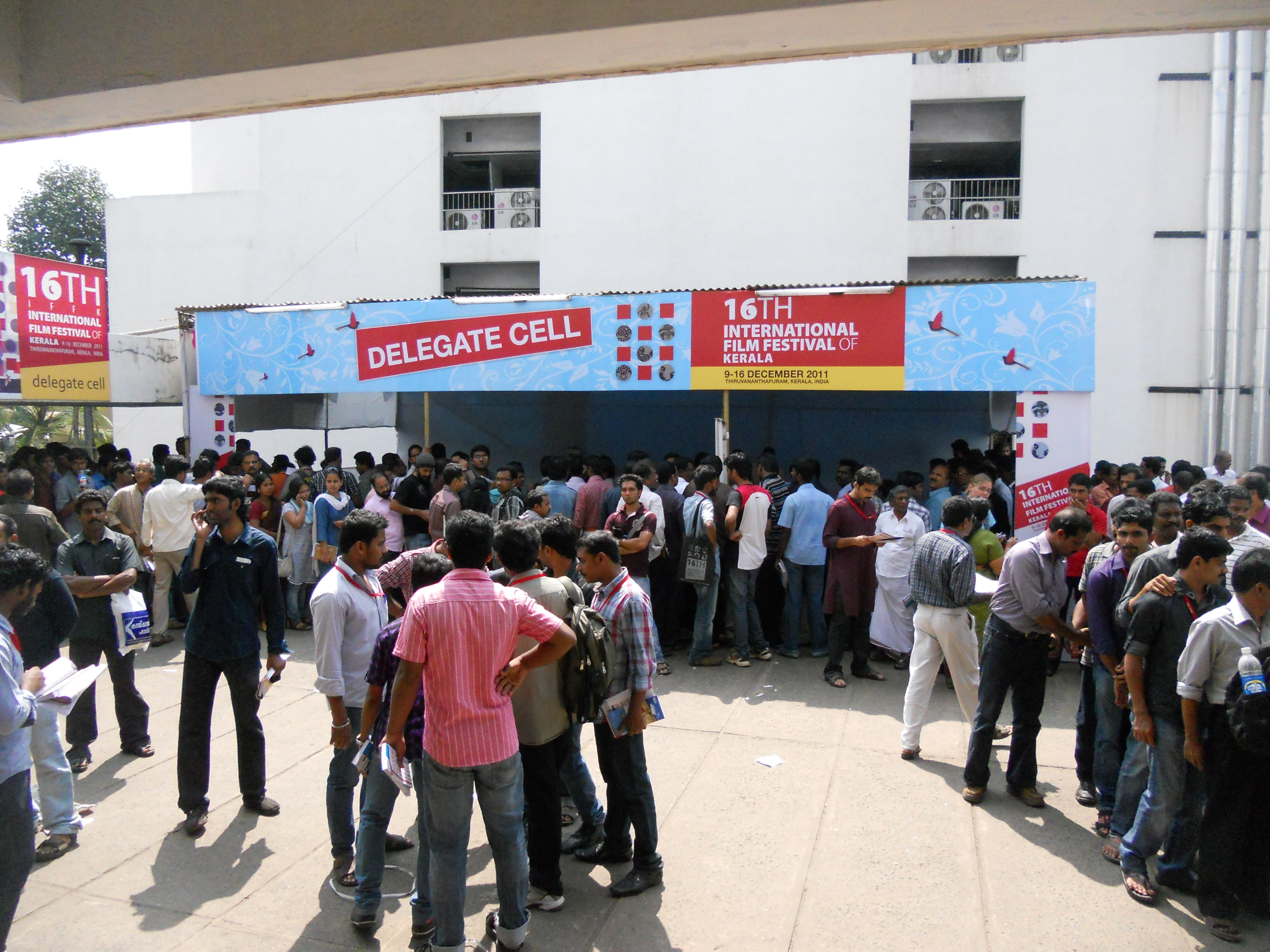
Rush at delegate pass distribution cell at Kalabhavan theatre

The 16th International Film Festival of Kerala (IFFK 2011) was at Thiruvananthapuram 9- December 2011. It was opened by the state of Kerala Chief Minister Oommen Chandy with actress Jaya Bachchan as the guest of honor. The inaugural film was Under the Hawthron Tree, directed by Chinese film-maker Zhang Yimou. Noted director Priyadarshan was the jury chairman. K G Santhosh was the Secretary and executive Director of the Festival.

=== The Awards ===
- The Golden Crow Pheasant Award for Best Feature Film – The Colours of the Mountain, directed by Carlos Cesar Arbelaez
- The Silver Crow Pheasant Award for Best Debut Film – A Stone's Thrown Away (Sebastian Hiriat)
- The Silver Crow Pheasant Award for Best Director – Hamid Reza Aligholian (Flemingo No: 13)
- The Silver Crow Pheasant Award for Best Feature Film (Audience Prize) – The Painting Lesson (Pablo Perelman)
- FIPRESCI Award for Best Asian Film – Future Lasts Forever (Ozcan Alper)
- FIPRESCI Award for Best Malayalam Film – Adaminte Makan Abu ('Abu, son of Adam') (Salim Ahamed)
- NETPAC Award for Best Asian Film – At the End of It All (Aditi Roy)
- NETPAC Award for Best Malayalam Film – Adaminte Makan Abu (Salim Ahamed)
- Hassan Kutty Award for Best Debut Indian Film – Adaminte Makan Abu (Salim Ahamed)

== IFFK 2010 ==
The 15th International Film Festival of Kerala (IFFK 2010) was at Thiruvananthapuram 10–17 December 2010. It was opened by the state of Kerala Chief Minister V.S. Achuthanandan with Indian actress Waheeda Rahman as the guest of honor. Werner Herzog, the German filmmaker, was conferred with the Lifetime Achievement Award in the inaugural ceremony. A jury headed by Adoor Gopalakrishnan chose him for the award. The opening film was Please Do Not Disturb. Around 8000 delegates which included film makers, artists and film buffs from all over India and abroad participated in the 8-day long festival.

Members of the jury included Julie Dash, Mexican filmmaker Maria Novaro, Thai filmmaker Apichatpong Weerasethakul, Japanese filmmaker Yashuhiro Hariki and Indian screenplay writer and photographer Sooni Taraporevala.

The festival had a retrospective section of Rainer Werner Fassbinder, and showed films of Werner Herzog, Olivier Assayas, Mario Novaro and Apichatpong Weerasethakul. A total of 207 films from 83 countries were screened at the 15th IFFK giving prominence to the films from Asia, Latin America and Africa.

There were various film discussion sessions with Werner Herzog, Apichatpong Weerasethakul, Julie Dash, Maria Novaro, Juliane Lorenz and many prominent Indian filmmakers. Mani Ratnam, notable Indian filmmaker, was the chief guest of the closing ceremony.

=== The Awards ===
- The Golden Crow Pheasant Award for Best Feature Film – "Portraits in a Sea of Lies", directed by Carlos Gaviria (Colombia)
- The Silver Crow Pheasant Award for Best Debut Film – Zephyr, directed by Belma Bas
- The Silver Crow Pheasant Award for Best Director – Julia Solomonoff for"The Last Summer of La Boyita"
- FIPRESCI Award for Best Film – Dowaha, ('Buried Secrets') directed by Raja Amari
- FIPRESCI Award for Best Malayalam Film – Makaramanju, directed by Lenin Rajendran
- NETPAC Award for Best Asian Film – "I Am—Afiya Megha Abhimanyu Omar", directed by Onir Anirban.
- NETPAC Award for Best Malayalam Film – Veettilekkulla Vazhi (The Way Home), directed by Dr. Biju
- Hassan Kutty Award for Best Debut Indian Film – Chitrasutram directed by Vipin Vijay.

== IFFK 2009 ==
The 14th IFFK was 11–18 December 2009. The competition jury included: Chairperson Bahman Ghobadi (Iran), Balufu Bakupa Kanyinda (Congo), Prassanna Vithnarage (Sri Lanka), Mamta Shankar (India) and Hala Khalili (Egypt).

=== Awards ===
Competition awards went to:

- Suvarna Chakoram and cash prize of Rs. 1 million for Best film shared between: Darbareye Elly/About Elly (Iran) Director: Asghar Farhadi and Jermal /Fishing Platform (Indonesia) Director: Ravi Bharwani
- Rajatha Chakoram and cash prize of Rs 300,000 for Best Director: Nosir Saidov for True Noon (Tajikistan)
- Rajatha Chakoram and a cash prize of Rs 200,000 for Best Debut Film: Izulu Lami /My Secret Sky Dir: Madoda Ncayiyana
- Rajatha Chakoram and a cash prize of Rs 100,000 for Audience Award: Ghiyame Rooz/True Noon (Tajikistan) directed by Nosir Saidov
- FIPRESCI Award for Best Film: La Mosca en la Ceniza/ A Fly in the Ashes (Argentina) Dir: Gabriela David
- FIPRESCI Award for Best Malayalam Film: Pathaam Nilayile Theevandi/ Train on the Tenth Floor dir: Joshy Mathew
- NETPAC Award for Best Asian Film in Competition: Jermal /Fishing Platform (Indonesia) Director: Ravi Bharwani
- NETPAC Award for Best Malayalam Film : Kerala Café: Dirs: Shyamaprasad, Lal Jose, Shaji Kailas, B Unnikrishnan, Revathy, Anvar Rasheed, Padma Kumar, Anjali Menon, Uday Ananathan, Sankar Ramakrishnan
- Hassan Kutty Award for Best Debut Indian Film (Certificate and a cash prize of Rs 50,000/ instituted by Mira Nair): Harishchandrachi Factory/ Harishchandra's Factory (Marathi) Dir: Paresh Mokashi

== IFFK 2008 ==
The 13th International Film Festival of Kerala was held from 12 to 19 December 2008. The festival was inaugurated by the Chief Minister of Kerala, V. S. Achutanandan. Argentinean filmmaker Fernando Birri and veteran actor K.R. Vijaya were the chief guests. The opening film of the festival was Laila's Birthday, by Palestinian director Rashid Masharawi. The eight-day long festival had 182 films from 53 countries. 14 films, including two Malayalam films, were in the competition section. Lucia Murat (Brazil) headed the jury, which also consisted of Samira Makhmalbaf (Iran), Sitora Alieva (Russia), Allain Jalladeau (France) and Jabbar Patel (India). The juries representing Fipresci (International Federation of Film Critics)were Chris Fujiwara, Barbara Lorey and Manoj Barjpujari. The NETPAC (Network for the Promotion of Asian Cinema) nominated juries were Sudhir Mishra, Freddie Wong and Max Tesseir.

=== The Awards ===
- Suvarna Chakoram and cash prize of Rs. 1 million for the Best Film: Parque Via (Dir:Enrique Rivero) (86min/Mexico/2008)
- Rajatha Chakoram and cash prize of Rs. 300,000 for Best Director: Mariana Rondon for Postcards from Leningrad
- Rajatha Chakoram and cash prize of Rs. 200,000 for Best Debut Film: My Marlon and Brando (Dir:Huseyin Karabey) (92min/Turkey/2008)
- Special Jury Award for the Best Debut Film: Firaaq (Dir: Nandita Das) (101min/Hindi/2008)
- Special Jury Award: The Yellow House (Dir:Amor Hakkar) (84min/Algeria, France/2008)
- Audience Award for the best film: Machan (Dir: Uberto Pasolini, Sri Lanka)
- FIPRESCI award for Best Film: Postcards from Leningrad (Dir: Mariana Rondon)
- FIPRESCI award for the best Malayalam film: Manjadikuru (Dir: Anjali Menon)
- NETPAC award for the best Asian film: My Marlon and Brando (Dir: Huseyin Karabey)
- NETPAC award for the best Malayalam film: Adayalangal (Dir: M.G. Sasi)
- Hassankutty Award for the best Indian debut director: Anjali Menon for Manjadikuru

== IFFK 2007 ==
The 12th IFFK (IFFK 2007) was 6–14 December. The festival was opened by actor Kamal Haasan; Miguel Littin (Chilean director), MA Baby was the guest of honor. Other notable attendees included: the Minister for Cultural Affairs, state of Kerala; and actors Naseeruddin Shah and Mohanlal. Twelve people were honored at the competition for their contribution to the growth of the Malayalam cinema: producers M.O. Joseph, K.N. Ravindranathan Nair, R.S. Prabhu, the former Film Archives director P.K. Nair, music directors, M.S. Viswanathan and M.K. Arjunan, playback singer S. Janaki, art director S. Konnanad, actors KPAC Lalitha, K. R. Vijaya, T. R. Omana, Santhadevi and makeup man Velappan. 231 films from 54 countries were screened at eight cinema halls in Thiruvananthapuram, namely Ajanta, New Theatre, Kalabhavan, Kairali, Sree, Kripa, Dhanya and Remya theatres.

14 films were selected for the competition section which was limited to films produced or co-produced in Asia, Africa & Latin America between September 2006 and August 2007. The jury consisted of Iranian filmmaker Jafar Panahi, African actor and director Naky Sy Savene, Polish scenarist Agnieska Holland, actor and producer Naseeruddin Shah and Cuban Film Academy director Rigoberto Lopez. Journalist Sheila Johnston heads the Fipresci jury which consisted of Turkish critic Cüneyt Cebenoyan and documentary filmmaker Varala Anand.

=== The Awards ===
- Suvarna Chakoram and cash prize of Rs. 1 million for the best film shared by: XXY directed by Lucia Puenzo and 10+4 directed by Mania Akbari
- Rajatha Chakoram and cash prize of Rs. 200,000 for the Best director: Mania Akbari (Iran) 10+4
- Rajatha Chakoram and cash prize of Rs. 300,000 for the Best Debut Film: Lucia Puenzo (Argentina) for XXY
- Special jury prize: Abdullah Oguz (Turkey) for Bliss
- FIPRESCI Award for the Best Film in competition: Sleepwalking Land
- FIPRESCI Award for the Best Malayalam Film: Ore Kadal
- NETPAC Award for the Best Asian Film in competition: Getting Home
- NETPAC Award for the Best Malayalam Film: Ore Kadal
