= Neha Singh =

Indian anti-harassment activist

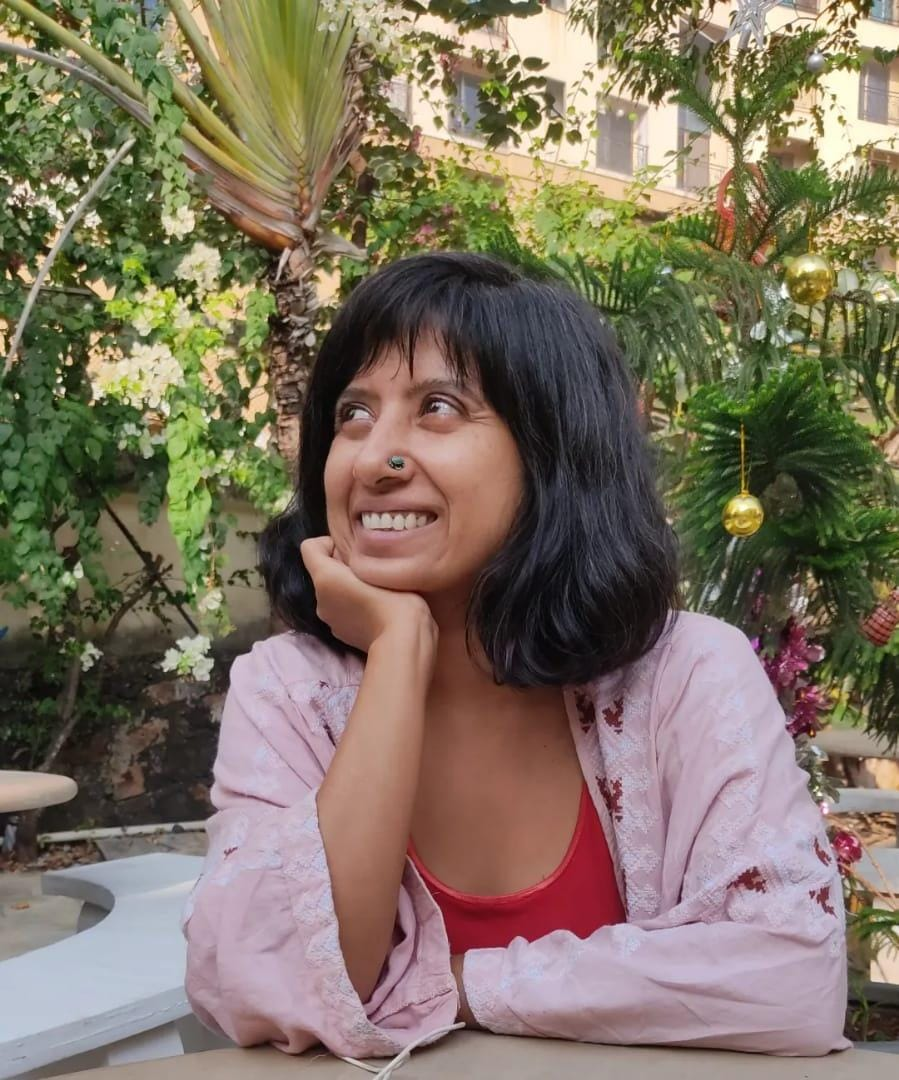
- Born: 5 May 1982 (age 44); Varanasi, Uttar Pradesh, India
- Occupations: Author, Activist, actor
- Years active: 2012–present

Neha Singh (born 5 May 1982) is an Indian theatre-maker, author and campaigner who encourages women to ignore harassment and reclaim the public space.

Neha Singh started the Why loiter? movement in 2014, after she read a book of the same name by three Mumbai-based feminists, Shilpa Phadke, Sameera Khan and Shilpa Ranade. Neha, along with other participants, have explored and experimented with various forms on loitering. The campaign involves encouraging women to report instances of sexual harassment and rape against men in authority.

Neha is the editor-in-chief of the blog www.whyloiter.blogspot.com, which documents and collects stories of the loitering group as well as stories sent in by various women across the world about their own experiences of public spaces. She was included in the BBC's annual list of 100 women who have made a positive impact on the world in 2016.

== Literary works ==
Neha Singh started writing for children in 2011 and her first book, The Wednesday Bazaar, was released in 2014. Since then she has written seven further books for children and young adults and been featured in an anthology. These include Bela misses her train (2017) for Karadi Tales, Moongphali (2017) for Rupa Publications, I need to pee (2018) for Penguin Random House India, Its playtime (2018), Kuchh gadbad hai (2019) and On the metro (2020) for Pratham Books, and Is it the same for you? (2019) for Seagull Books, India. Neha has contributed stories to The Hindu Young World Anthology (2019) and Thank God it's Caturday, a Westland Publication (2020). She also writes poems, fiction and non-fiction in Hindi for children and young adults that feature regularly in the children's magazines 'Cycle', 'Pluto' and 'Chakmak'. Her poems and stories have been turned into posters, bookmarks and poetry cards for children.

Neha's books have been nominated for several Indian and international awards like Jarul Book Awards, Neev Literary Awards, Comic Con India Awards, Peekabook Awards and her book I need to pee won a commendation at the South Asia Book Awards 2019 in the USA. She has travelled to various literary festivals across India with her books, including the Kala Ghoda Arts Festival (Mumbai), The Hindu Lit for Life (Chennai), Kolkata Literary Festival, Jaipur Literature Festival, Kitaabo children's literature festival (Jodhpur), Bookaroo children's literature festivals (Jaipur and Srinagar), Peekabook children's literary festival (Mumbai) and Neev literary festival (Bangalore).

== Theatre Work ==
Neha is also a theatre practitioner and acts, writes, directs and produces plays. She has her own theatre company called 'Rahi theatre' and has produced, written and directed two plays, Dohri Zindagi and Jhalkari, which have toured India and been staged 75 times. She has written plays like Island for Manav Kaul's company, Gittu Bittu for Rasika Agashe and Md. Zeeshan Ayub, Walk like a woman for The Asia Foundation and The magnificent madness of Mastipur for Australian director Peter Williams and Balinese shadow puppeteer Made Sidea.

Neha Singh has written and directed a unique theatre production called "Dharavi Dreams". This hip-hop musical play is based on the real life stories of the student artists of Dharavi. In collaboration with The Dharavi Dream Project, Neha Singh's play has been touring the country and giving these young hiphoppers from Dharavi a platform to tell their stories and showcase their talents to the world.

Neha adapted and directed "Woh" for the NCPA connections festival in 2025 and received rave reviews for the performance.

== Films ==
Neha has written and directed four short films. A handful of sky won a special mention at the 'Mumbai Dimensions' competition in the 10th MAMI film festival. Her second film, Paperplanes, was in the competition section at the International Film Festival of India (Goa, 2011). Her third film, My parents don't fit, was produced by Anat films. Her fourth film, Chitrangada 2020 was part of the theatre film theatre festival organised by theatre director producer Atul Kumar.

In 2019 she acted in the film Aani Maani, and was nominated in the Best Actress in a Supporting Role category at the 7th FOI Online Awards in 2022.

Her current projects involve two feature films that are in pre-production with Humaara Movies where she is involved as a screenplay writer. Her non-fiction podcast show Akeli awaara azaad with Culture Machine has been shortlisted by Spotify. She is also working as a writer director on two concepts for children's web shows with Mukesh Chhabra.

== Bibliography ==
- The Wednesday Bazaar, 2014
- Bela misses her train, 2017
- Moongphali, 2017
- I need to pee, 2018
- Its playtime, 2018
- Kuchh gadbad hai, 2019
- On the metro, 2020
- Is it the same for you? 2019
