= Mazhuvannur =

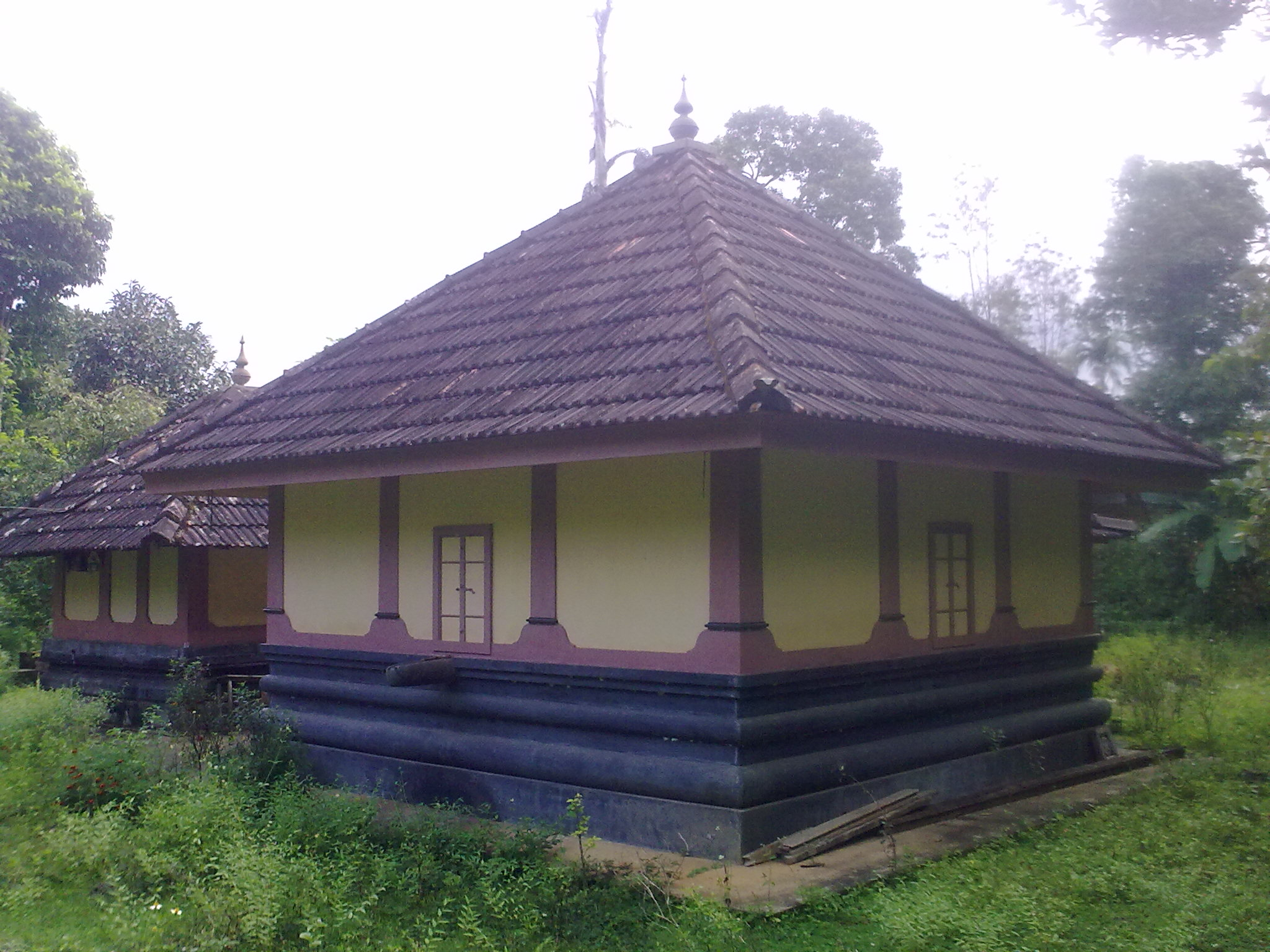
- Mazhuvannur Temple

- Location in Kerala, India Mazhuvannur (India)
- Coordinates: 11.73023°N 75.98737°E

Mazhuvannur (Literal meaning : The place where Axe has Fallen) is where many Hindus believe the axe of Shiva is believed to have fallen )

Mazhuvannur is a hilly village located 10 Kilometres from Mananthavady in Wayanad district, Kerala, India. The place is located near the small town of Tharuvana in Porunnannur Village. The main cultural attraction of this place is Mazhuvannur Maha Siva Kshethram ( Hindu Temple of LordShiva ). It is a very ancient temple and is being renovated in the recent times. This place is bestowed with rich natural trees and plants. Earlier the Village office was located at Mazhuvannur Hills.

== Transportation ==
Mazhavannur can be accessed from Mananthavady or Kalpetta. The Periya ghat road connects Mananthavady to Kannur and Thalassery. The Thamarassery mountain road connects Calicut with Kalpetta. The Kuttiady mountain road connects Vatakara with Kalpetta and Mananthavady. The Palchuram mountain road connects Kannur and Iritty with Mananthavady. The road from Nilambur to Ooty is also connected to Wayanad through the village of Meppadi.

The nearest railway station is at Mysore and the nearest airports are Kozhikode International Airport-120 km, Bengaluru International Airport-290 km, and Kannur International Airport, 58 km.
