= Kinfra Film and Video Park =

Infotainment industrial park, Kerala, India

KINFRA Film and Video Park
- Industry: Infotainment Industry in digital animation and cinema sector
- Headquarters: Thiruvananthapuram, Kerala, India
- Website: kinfra.org/departments/kinfra-film-video-park-kazhakkuttom

KINFRA Film and Video Park is India's first Infotainment Industrial Park. It is also the first SEZ in India for animation and gaming. It is situated in Thiruvananthapuram, the capital of Kerala State. The Park is a fully owned subsidiary of KINFRA, a statutory body of the Kerala Government.

The Kinfra SEZ was initially notified for IT- Animation & Gaming in 2007 but recently KINFRA has got approval from the Government of India for setting up a sector specific Special Economic Zone (SEZ) IT & ITES, in a plot of 25 acres of land at KINFRA Film and Video Park.

Out of the 25 acres of land, KINFRA has constructed Drishya Building, which provides built-up space for export-oriented animation production units and IT and ITES units. KINFRA Film & Video Park has constructed a building with basic infrastructures and road access for setting up an International Animation School. The largest motion capture facility in the country, set up by Accel Animation Studios, is being harnessed to create 2-D and 3-D animation products for international clients, India's only animation studio at the KINFRA film and video Park.

Vismayas Max Studio - The studio was set up in 2002 by Mohanlal.

DCSMAT School of Media and Business is situated in KINFRA Film and Video Park.

Ernst & Young Global Shared Services (GSS) has set up their third centre in Kerala at the KINFRA Film & Video Park Special Economic Zone. The KINFRA Film and Video Park is located between Technopark and the proposed Technocity project in Trivandrum.

Gopinath Muthukad's Magic Planet is a venture established to cater for the promotion of magic based industry. It is in the process of establishing a hub for science & mirrors. This is the first ever project with 5 D theatre, Mirror Palace etc.

== See also ==
- Kerala Industrial Infrastructure Development Corporation
