= Sreekanteswaram Padmanabha Pillai =

Indian lexicographer

Sreekanteswaram G. Padmanabha Pillai (1865–1946), popularly known as Sreekanteswaram, was a lexicographer and scholar best known for his Malayalam dictionary Sabdatharavali.

== Life ==
Padmanabha Pillai was born in 1865 in Sreekanteswaram, Thiruvananthapuram (Trivandrum).

He studied English, Tamil and Sanskrit and wrote Duryodhanavadham and Dharmaguptavadham at a young age. He later worked as a lawyer.

He started his work on Sabdatharavali at the age of 32. The first part of the book came out in 1918. The dictionary, which runs into more than 1600 pages, took twenty years to complete. His son P. Damodara Pillai later compiled a concise version. Padmanabha Pillai also prepared a pocket dictionary in 1906.

Padmanabha Pillai wrote around sixty books in his lifetime. He ran the magazine Bhashavilasam for a time and left two dictionaries - Sahityabharanam and an English-Malayalam dictionary - incomplete at the time of his death.

== See also ==
- Kanippayyur Shankaran Namboodiripad
- Njattyela Sreedharan
