= Njattyela Sreedharan =

Indian lexicographer (1938–2025)

- Born: 20 December 1938; Thalassery, Madras Province, British India
- Died: 13 August 2025 (aged 86); Thalassery, Kerala, India
- Occupation: Lexicographer
- Spouse: Yashoda

Njattyela Sreedharan (Malayalam: ഞാറ്റ്യേല ശ്രീധരന്‍, IPA: [ɲaːtːjeːlɐ ʃriːd̪ʰɐɾɐn]; 20 December 1938 – 13 August 2025) was an Indian lexicographer from Thalassery in Kerala. He is known for compiling a dictionary connecting four major Dravidian languages Malayalam, Kannada, Tamil and Telugu.

== Background ==
Sreedharan was born in Thalassery, Madras Province, British India on 20 December 1938. He died at his residence on 13 August 2025, at the age of 86.

== Selected books ==
- Malayalam–Tamil Dictionary (2012)
- Chathur Dravida Bhasha Nighandu (Dictionary of Four Dravidian Languages) (2020)
- Chathur Dravida Bhasha Padaparichayam (Published by Kerala Bhasha Institute) (2023)
- Ormakalude Thirayattam (Autobiography) (2024)

The Chathur Dravida Bhasha Nighandu was digitized and published as the Samam Four-Language Dictionary in 2024, through a collaboration between the Indic Digital Archive Foundation and the Malayalam Mission’s Karnataka Chapter.

== In popular culture ==
The 2021 documentary Dreaming of Words, directed by Nandan, celebrates the life and work of Njattyela Sreedharan. Dreaming of Words has received numerous accolades including a National Film Award and was screened at the annual convention of the Modern Language Association and the annual conference of the Linguistic Society of America in January 2022.

== Major awards ==
- Dr. Hermann Gundert Award for the best dictionary (2022) instituted by Dravidian Linguistics Association.
- Special Jury Award at the 5th India Reading Olympiad (2023), organised by the Food4Thought Foundation, which was presented during the 13th Hyderabad Literary Festival.

== See also ==
- Multilingualism
- Sreekanteswaram Padmanabha Pillai
- Dreaming of Words
- Samam
